= Robotkid =

Computer video artist and game developer

Robotkid is the alias of Josh Randall, an electronic dance musician, video artist, and video game developer from Cambridge, Massachusetts. Along with PK, he was part of the mid-1990s synthcore band Institute of Technology. He is the former Creative Director at Harmonix Music Systems, the video game studio responsible for the Karaoke Revolution, Guitar Hero, and Rock Band series. Prior to Harmonix, Randall worked for Looking Glass Studios. Like Freezepop, whose Kasson Crooker also works for Harmonix, Robotkid's music has made appearances on the studio's game releases.

== Discography ==
=== Robotkid ===
- You Shriek – "Grim" (1994, Deaktiv) (song: "Grim" (Reality remix))
- Freezepop – Fashion Impression Function (2001, Archenemy) (song: "Science Genius Girl" (Robotkid's Lameboy mix))
- Frequency video game (2001, Harmonix) (song: "End of Your World" by Robotkid and Inter:sekt)

=== Institute of Technology ===
- The Return of the Bass EP (1994, self-released)
- "Smart Bomb" (split 7-inch with Sirensong) (1994, Breakfast)
- Hellscape compilation (1995, Furnace) (songs: "Justfiable Homiside" and "Dub B-Yond All Computation")
- Accidents Have No Holidays compilation (1995, Povertech) (song: "Excerpt from Spacejam 2000")
- Operation Beatbox compilation (1996, Re-Constriction) (song: "King of Rock")
- Boston Elektro 101 compilation (1996, Sinless) (song: "Mizerable")
- TV Terror compilation (1997, Re-Constriction) (song: "Mary Tyler Moore")
- Killing Floor – "Come Together" CD single (1997, Re-Constriction) (song: "Tear It All Away" (Institute of Technology remix))
- Digital Wings 1 compilation (1997, Cyberden) (song: "Smartbeets")

== Ludography ==
| Name | Year | Credited with | Company |
|---|---|---|---|
| Flight Unlimited | 1995 | playtester | Looking Glass Studios |
| Terra Nova: Strike Force Centauri | 1996 | video composition, voice actor | Looking Glass Studios |
| British Open Championship Golf | 1997 | video director | Looking Glass Studios |
| Flight Unlimited II | 1997 | AV support | Looking Glass Studios |
| Thief: The Dark Project | 1998 | producer, cutscenes (co-director, editor) | Looking Glass Studios |
| System Shock 2 | 1999 | producer, voice actor | Looking Glass Studios |
| Flight Unlimited III | 1999 | AV support | Looking Glass Studios |
| Frequency | 2001 | music director | Harmonix |
| Amplitude | 2003 | music director | Harmonix |
| Karaoke Revolution | 2003 | project leader | Harmonix |
| Karaoke Revolution Volume 2 | 2004 | creative director | Harmonix |
| Karaoke Revolution Volume 3 | 2004 | creative director | Harmonix |
| Guitar Hero | 2005 | creative director | Harmonix |
| Karaoke Revolution Party | 2005 | creative director | Harmonix |
| CMT Presents: Karaoke Revolution Country | 2006 | creative director | Harmonix |
| Guitar Hero II | 2006 | creative director | Harmonix |
| Guitar Hero Encore: Rocks the 80s | 2007 | creative director | Harmonix |
| Phase | 2007 | creative director | Harmonix |
| Rock Band | 2007 | creative director | Harmonix |
| AC/DC Live: Rock Band Track Pack | 2008 | creative director | Harmonix |
| The Beatles: Rock Band | 2009 | project leader, creative director, art director | Harmonix |
| Rock Band 3 | 2010 | creative director | Harmonix |
| Dance Central | 2010 | creative director | Harmonix |
| Dance Central 2 | 2011 | creative director | Harmonix |
