= Amplitude (2016 video game) =

2016 rhythm video game

- Developer: Harmonix
- Publisher: Harmonix
- Platforms: PlayStation 4 PlayStation 3
- Release: PlayStation 4 January 5, 2016; PlayStation 3 April 3, 2016
- Genre: Rhythm
- Modes: Single-player, multiplayer

Amplitude is a 2016 rhythm video game developed and published by Harmonix for the PlayStation 4. It was also released for the PlayStation 3 the same year. A sequel to Amplitude (2003), it was licensed by Sony Computer Entertainment, who owns the rights to Frequency and the original game. The game received generally average reviews upon release.

== Gameplay ==
The new game would keep the same style of gameplay from the original title, but would feature new songs, modern graphics, and integration of the modern hardware features of the PlayStation consoles.

In addition to the original's features, the game includes team play mode, allowing for cooperative-competitive gameplay. This mode, suggested by Harmonix' Pete Maguire and added late in the development period, allows two teams, either 2-on-2 or 3-on-1, to play through a song without failing, accounting for player difficulty levels between all players. The game also includes a FreQuency mode, where the nearly-flat track layout can be switched to the tunnel approach that was used in the original FreQuency. Harmonix developed a new game engine, Forge, which was also used for the development of Rock Band 4, for the reboot.

== Development ==
Harmonix launched a Kickstarter campaign to raise US$775,000 to fund a successor for Amplitude, which would be released digitally and physically for PlayStation 3 and PlayStation 4 in May 2014. The campaign reached its target on May 22, within 24 hours of the funding period's deadline. The Kickstarter completed with over $844,000 in funds from over 14,000 users. Major funding backers included Insomniac Games' CEO Ted Price.

Harmonix's Ryan Lesser stated the choice for using Kickstarter was based on knowing that demand was high for a sequel to Amplitude, and opted to use the crowd-funding mechanism to see if it was a viable vehicle for future projects for the company. The company later said that they have also tried to obtain funding for this reboot by other means prior to using Kickstarter, and noted that the funds they seek were less than half of the amount needed, having planned to provide the other half from internal funding if the response was good. Harmonix noted that the game would be exclusive to PlayStation platforms, as the Amplitude concepts and trademark remain property of Sony.

Originally the game was planned to be released with music provided by in-house musicians from Harmonix with the possibility of licensed music by reaching various stretch goals. During the Kickstarter period they were able to secure offerings by groups like Freezepop and Kasson Crooker who have provided music before for the original Amplitude as well as other popular video game music groups including Anamanaguchi, Danny Baranowsky, and Jim Guthrie. A total of 30 songs were expected to ship with the title on release.

Though originally slated to be released in March 2015, Harmonix said that due to their inexperience on working on the PlayStation 4 platform, they were aiming for an early 2016 release to assure the quality of the reboot. The reboot was released in January 2016 for the PlayStation 4 with the PlayStation 3 version releasing on April 5.

== Songs ==
The game shipped with more than 30 songs, including 15 songs composed by Harmonix in the game's "concept album", used for the game's campaign mode.

Song title	Artist	Brain Region	Original/Remix track created for Amplitude?
"01 Perfect Brain"	Harmonix Music Systems	1. Prefrontal Cortex	Yes
"02 Wetware"	Harmonix Music Systems	1. Prefrontal Cortex	Yes
"03 Dreamer"	Harmonix Music Systems	1. Prefrontal Cortex	Yes
"04 Recession"	Jeff Allen featuring Noelle LeBlanc & Naoko Takamoto	1. Prefrontal Cortex	Yes
"05 Break For Me"	James Landino featuring Noelle LeBlanc	1. Prefrontal Cortex	Yes
"06 Decode Me"	inter:sect featuring Noelle LeBlanc & Naoko Takamoto	2. Temporal Lobe	Yes
"07 I.C.U."	Harmonix Music Systems	2. Temporal Lobe	Yes
"08 Human Love"	Harmonix Music Systems	2. Temporal Lobe	Yes
"09 Astrosight"	inter:sect featuring Noelle LeBlanc & Naoko Takamoto	2. Temporal Lobe	Yes
"10 Magpie"	Harmonix Music Systems	2. Temporal Lobe	Yes
"11 Supraspatial"	Jeff Allen featuring Naoko Takamoto	3. Limbic System	Yes
"12 Digital Paralysis"	Harmonix Music Systems	3. Limbic System	Yes
"13 Energize"	Harmonix Music Systems	3. Limbic System	Yes
"14 Dalatecht"	Harmonix Music Systems	3. Limbic System	Yes
"15 Wayfarer"	Harmonix Music Systems	3. Limbic System	Yes
"All The Time"	C418	Quickplay	Yes
"Assault on Psychofortress"	Single White Infidel	Quickplay	No
"Concept"	Symbion Project	Quickplay	No
"Crazy Ride"	Insomniac Games	Quickplay	No
"Crypteque (1-2)"	Danny Baranowsky	Quickplay	No
"Crystal"	George & Jonathan	Quickplay	Shortened
"Do Not Retreat" ^{†}	Komputer Kontroller	Quickplay	No
"Entomophobia"	M-Cue	Quickplay	Remix
"Force Quit"	Jim Guthrie	Quickplay	Yes
"Impossible"	Darren Korb	Quickplay	No
"Lights"	Wolfgun	Quickplay	Shortened
"Muze (Amplitude Remix)"	Ingrid Lukas, Remix by Patrik Zosso and Nik Bärtsch	Quickplay	Remix
"Phantoms"	Freezepop	Quickplay	No
"Red Giant"	Kodomo	Quickplay	Shortened
"Synthesized (Inside Your Mind Remix)"	Symbion Project	Quickplay	Remix
"Unfinished Business"	Shiohito Taki & Junichi Kamiunten	Quickplay	Shortened

† Kickstarter bonus tier exclusive

== Reception ==
Reception

Aggregate score
Aggregator	Score
Metacritic	74/100

Review scores
Publication	Score
Game Informer	7.75/10
GameSpot	7/10
IGN	7/10
USgamer	3.5/5
VentureBeat	74/100
The Daily Telegraph	3/5

The PS4 version received "average" reviews, one point short of being "generally favorable", according to Metacritic.

The Digital Fix gave it a score of eight out of ten, calling it "a unique concept album that challenges your mind and your dexterity". Slant Magazine similarly gave it four stars out of five, saying that it was "so obviously a labor of love that it's difficult to criticize it, especially given all of the ways in which Harmonix has addressed the concerns for fans who funded them on Kickstarter".

However, The Escapist gave it three-and-a-half stars out of five: "While some more star power in the soundtrack would have went [sic] a long way, and the way Harmonix artificially pads the game's length with its song unlock requirements is ridiculous, Amplitude remains an exciting blend of rhythm action and electronica that does well by its predecessors". 411Mania gave it a score of seven out of ten: "Overall, Harmonix did a great job capturing the body of Amplitude again. The gameplay is good and easy to pick up, even if you haven't played the game in years. However, the soul of the game, the soundtrack, may have gamers looking elsewhere for their music game fix". National Post gave it six out of ten, saying that it was "destined for most people to become that slightly off record from their favourite band. You spun it a few times the day you bought it, and you really did try to love it. But now it just sits there, rarely played, a reminder that even those you admire most are capable of mistakes". The Daily Telegraph similarly gave it three stars out of five, saying that the game "has a thumping heart and soul, a timeless nucleus of gameplay that I hope Harmonix has the opportunity to build upon. A euphoric finger dance across a fizzing, abstract space".
