= Freezepop Forever =

Studio album by Freezepop
- Released: 2000 (Original release); 2002 (Elefant release); 2005 (Archenemy re-issue)
- Recorded: Symbion Basement Studio
- Genre: Synth-pop
- Length: 44:47(Original release); 48:21(Elefant release); 44:11(Archenemy re-issue)
- Label: The Archenemy Record Company (US), Elefant (UK)
- Producer: The Duke of Candied Apples

Freezepop chronology
| Freezepop Forever (2000) | Fashion Impression Function (2001) |

Alternative covers
- Elefant Release

Freezepop Forever is the debut studio album by synthpop band Freezepop, originally released in 2000. The album has been reissued multiple times, each including different bonus tracks or videos. The 2002 European release on the Elefant label features a bonus song, two music videos, digipack packaging and an alternate album cover. The 2005 Archenemy Record Company reissue is entirely remastered and features a music video for "テニスのボーイフレンド" (also referred to as "Tenisu no Boifurendo", "Tennis Boyfriend" in English).

The album contains the song "Science Genius Girl", popular for its appearances as a playable song in several music video games, including FreQuency, Karaoke Revolution, and as a downloadable song for Rock Band.

A "rock" remix of "Get Ready 2 Rokk" appears in the game Guitar Hero and was later included on the CD single The Rokk Suite. A similar version is now available as downloadable content for Rock Band.

Professional ratings
Review scores
| Source | Rating |
|---|---|
| Allmusic | link |
| PopMatters | (unfavorable) link |
| PopMatters | (favorable) April 3, 2002 |

== Track listing ==
=== Original release ===
All tracks written by The Duke of Candied Apples and Liz Enthusiasm, except where noted.

| No. | Title | Writer(s) | Length |
|---|---|---|---|
| 1. | "Harebrained Scheme" | | 3:53 |
| 2. | "Plastic Stars" | Duke | 3:59 |
| 3. | "Science Genius Girl" (Hi Phi Edit) | | 3:11 |
| 4. | "Get Ready 2 Rokk" | | 2:59 |
| 5. | "テニスのボーイフレンド" (Tennis Boyfriend) | | 5:33 |
| 6. | "T DJ" (Live on WMBR) | | 3:24 |
| 7. | "Tracey Gold" | Duke | 4:05 |
| 8. | "Robotron 2000" | | 3:06 |
| 9. | "Vacation" | | 3:11 |
| 10. | "Tender Lies" (Single Edit) | Drinkwater/Carla Norton | 3:42 |
| 11. | "Summer Boy" | | 3:06 |
| 12. | "Freezepop Forever" | Duke/Drinkwater/Enthusiasm | 6:43 |

=== Elefant release ===
| No. | Title | Writer(s) | Length |
|---|---|---|---|
| 1. | "Harebrained Scheme" | | 3:53 |
| 2. | "Plastic Stars" | Duke | 3:58 |
| 3. | "Science Genius Girl" | | 3:28 |
| 4. | "Get Ready 2 Rokk" | | 2:58 |
| 5. | "テニスのボーイフレンド" (Tennis Boyfriend) | | 5:32 |
| 6. | "T DJ" (Live on WMBR) | | 3:23 |
| 7. | "Tracey Gold" | Duke | 4:05 |
| 8. | "Robotron 2000" | | 3:06 |
| 9. | "Vacation" | | 3:10 |
| 10. | "Tender Lies" | Drinkwater/Carla Norton | 3:53 |
| 11. | "Summer Boy" | | 3:05 |
| 12. | "Freezepop Forever" | Duke/Drinkwater/Enthusiasm | 4:12 |
| 13. | "Science Genius Girl" (Decepticon Remix) | | 3:38 |

- The release also includes music videos for the tracks "Freezepop Forever" and "Tender Lies".

=== Archenemy re-issue ===
| No. | Title | Writer(s) | Length |
|---|---|---|---|
| 1. | "Harebrained Scheme" | | 3:53 |
| 2. | "Plastic Stars" | Duke | 3:57 |
| 3. | "Science Genius Girl" (Hi Phi Edit) | | 3:11 |
| 4. | "Get Ready 2 Rokk" | | 2:59 |
| 5. | "テニスのボーイフレンド" (Tennis Boyfriend) | | 5:33 |
| 6. | "T DJ" (Live on WMBR) | | 3:24 |
| 7. | "Tracey Gold" | Duke | 4:05 |
| 8. | "Robotron 2000" | | 3:06 |
| 9. | "Vacation" | | 3:11 |
| 10. | "Tender Lies" (Single Edit) | Drinkwater/Carla Norton | 3:41 |
| 11. | "Summer Boy" | | 3:05 |
| 12. | "Freezepop Forever" | Duke/Drinkwater/Enthusiasm | 4:10 |

- All tracks on the 2005 Archenemy re-issue are remastered. The disc features a music video for "テニスのボーイフレンド".

== Personnel ==
=== Performance ===
Freezepop:

- The Duke of Candied Apples
- Liz Enthusiasm
- Sean T. Drinkwater

=== Production ===
Freezepop Forever was recorded and mixed by The Duke at Symbion Basement Studios and mastered in Digital Performer during 2000. A Yamaha QY70 and MAM vocoder were used during recording. Additional recording and mixing was performed using a MotU Digital Performer with a 2408 mk1, a Yamaha Digital Mixer, Lexicon MPX and MPX G2 FX, and Genelec 1030 active monitors.

The 2005 Archenemy Records reissue was remastered by Dave Locke at JP Masters.
