= Splashdown (band) =

American pop rock band

- Origin: United States
- Genres: Pop rock; trip hop; alternative rock; downtempo; IDM
- Years active: 1996–2001, 2023
- Labels: Castle von Buhler Records, later signed to Capitol Records
- Members: Melissa Kaplan; Adam von Buhler; Kasson Crooker

Splashdown was an American pop rock band formed in 1996 in Allston, Massachusetts. The group disbanded in 2001; their last show was at the release party for the debut CD of Freezepop on February 2 of that year. Their last release was the single "Metamorphosis", which was put on streaming services and digital sale platforms on November 21, 2023.

== Career ==
Splashdown consisted of singer/pianist Melissa Kaplan, electronic programmer Kasson Crooker, and guitarist/bassist Adam Buhler. The trio increased in size to a five- or six-piece group for live shows; these line-ups frequently included drummer Jason Sakos and guitarist Trevor Shand. Buhler and Crooker were in another femme-fronted band in the mid-1990s, Sirensong. After the demise of this band, Buhler's then-wife Cynthia von Buhler (née Carrozza), with whom he co-owned Castle von Buhler Records, introduced him and Crooker to singer Kaplan, who had previously been a back-up singer for Cynthia's band Women of Sodom. With Cynthia as their manager, Splashdown was formed in 1996, playing their first live show on March 29, and their 7-inch vinyl record Pandora / Deserter was released the same year.

Their first full-length album, Stars and Garters, came in 1997, featuring nine tracks, including "Pandora" and "Deserter". That same year, the track "50%" appeared on Nigh, a compilation album released by Castle von Buhler. This was followed by the Halfworld EP in 1998, which contained four new songs and a reworked version of the Stars and Garters track "Beguiled", entitled "Beguiled Mark II". After their initial studio and tour success, Splashdown was signed to Glen Ballard's Java Records, an imprint of Capitol Records, which released a five-track EP in 1999, Redshift, that quickly sold out. Yet for reasons largely unknown, although troubles between Ballard and Capitol are partially to blame, Capitol never released their next full-length album, Blueshift. This album, co-produced by the band and engineer Bryan Carrigan and featuring two songs co-written by Ballard, included the five songs on Redshift, five old songs with new mixes that did not appear on Redshift (including "Games You Play", a reworking of the Stars and Garters song "Paradox"), and six all-new songs. The problems Splashdown endured with Capitol prompted the band to independently compile another full-length album, Possibilities, which included demos and previously released work that was not owned by Capitol. Around this time, members of Splashdown's mailing list received notice that any orders from their online store would include a free "bonus item," which was not specified in any further detail. A few days later, emails began returning from fans that indicated the bonus item was a copy of Blueshift, burned on a CD-R with a white label and plain text track listing. Blueshift and Possibilities are now widely available from numerous download sites. Fearing Capitol would own any future songs and lacking energy after their fight with their label, the band members announced in 2001 that they were on an "indefinite hiatus" and later stated that their time as Splashdown had ended.

While they were together, the band played on the second stage at many shows on the East Coast leg of the Lilith Fair tour in 1999. One of their songs, "Karma Slave," was featured on the soundtrack to the film Titan A.E.. Many of Splashdown's fans credit the Lilith Fair gigs and "Karma Slave" for helping them discover the band. In addition, the song "A Charming Spell" was featured on an episode of the TV show Charmed, and "Games You Play" was heard in an episode of Angel. The band's music also appeared in Ballard's movie Clubland.

Splashdown gained some fame from airplay on a number of college and alternative radio stations, including WBCN in Boston (in 1997, the band participated in the WBCN Rock & Roll Rumble) and WOXY in Cincinnati. However, they were most popular on WBER in Rochester, New York; on that station's year-end countdowns of top songs as voted on by listeners, "Ironspy" was ranked fifth in 1999, while "Mayan Pilot" was fourth and "A Charming Spell" tied for eighteenth in 2000. In addition, Splashdown once headlined the city's Lilac Festival, and when the band held a contest in 1999 to see who could sell the most Splashdown albums to their friends, all three of the top finishers were from Rochester.

== Post-break-up work ==
After Splashdown's break-up, Kaplan formed another band, Universal Hall Pass, which in 2004 released its first album, Mercury, and a six-song EP, entitled Subtle Things, in the last week of 2006. Kaplan is technically the only member of UHP. The first live Universal Hall Pass performance, on March 13, 2006, consisted solely of Kaplan and a piano. She has also sung on many film soundtracks, including K-PAX, Pretty Persuasion, The Chronicles of Riddick, The Skeleton Key, and Red Planet, among others. Many of the movies in which her voice is heard were scored by Graeme Revell.

Buhler produced and played bass on Boston band Sparkola's self-titled 2002 debut album and 2003 EP Handclaps & Slapbacks (both released on the Castle von Buhler label). Buhler, who at one point recorded with the darkwave band Black Tape for a Blue Girl before Splashdown's formation, is now half of the hard-rock duo Anarchy Club with Keith Smith, previously the lead singer of fellow Boston-area band C60. Their first album, The Way And Its Power, was released in 2005, and an EP followed in 2007, called "A Single Drop of Red." In late 2009, they released another full-length CD, "The Art of War." Anarchy Club's music has been featured as playable tracks in the best-selling games Guitar Hero, Guitar Hero 2, Rock Band, and Rock Band 2. In late 2010, he released a new CD under the name Map & Key, with music by Adam and singing by Scottish singer Alice Ishbel Watson. Their collaboration was conducted via Internet between America and Scotland.

Crooker went on to co-found Freezepop (who, as noted above, released their first album while Splashdown was still technically together) and continues to do solo work as Symbion Project, a moniker under which he has recorded since 1992. He and Kaplan recently worked together on Universal Hall Pass's "Subtle Things" EP. Crooker is also the Audio Director at Harmonix, makers of such hit music-heavy video games as FreQuency, Amplitude, and the Guitar Hero series. As most Harmonix-developed games are published by Konami, Crooker has also worked on some North American entries in that company's Dance Dance Revolution series. In addition to many Symbion Project and Freezepop songs being placed in these games (with many of Crooker's songs being attributed to aliases), Kaplan was heard in both Frequency and Amplitude.

On October 28, 2023, the band's long-dormant Facebook page was updated with a new picture of the band's name, along with the text "November 21, 2023". On November 17th, founding member Adam von Buhler wrote on his blog that he had recently been diagnosed with "a rare, aggressive case of The Thing Nobody Wants To Get." In this post, he described how this led to the band reconnecting, with Melissa Kaplan writing lyrics inspired by her conversations with Buhler in the wake of his diagnosis.

On November 21, Metamorphosis was released for digital sales and on streaming platforms. Also released was a demo version of Nomadic, a song which had been played as a work-in-progress at live shows but not officially released.

== Music distribution ==
When Splashdown was together in the late 1990s at the height of the popularity of file-sharing programs such as Napster, they discouraged online sharing of their songs. After the band's break-up, however, Splashdown and their fans made efforts to ensure their music was available for free online. The band's entire catalog is still available for download for free on the web, though remastered versions of their first two (pre-Capitol) releases are also available on iTunes.

== Discography ==
Pandora/Deserter (7", 1996)

1. Pandora
2. Deserter

Stars and Garters (LP, 1997)

1. Thunder
2. Pandora
3. Presumed Lost
4. Beguiled
5. So Ha
6. Need Versus Want
7. Paradox
8. Deserter
9. Running With Scissors

Halfworld (EP, 1998)

1. Ironspy
2. Sugar High
3. Halfworld
4. Over The Wall
5. Beguiled Mark II

Redshift (EP, 1999)

1. A Charming Spell
2. The Archer
3. Mayan Pilot
4. Waterbead
5. Ironspy

Blueshift (LP, unreleased, 2000)

1. A Charming Spell
2. Presumed Lost
3. Sugar High
4. All Things
5. Mayan Pilot
6. The Archer
7. Elvis Sunday
8. Ironspy
9. Games You Play
10. Dig
11. Waterbead
12. Procreation Chick
13. Lost Frontier
14. Halfworld
15. I Understand
16. Over The Wall

Possibilities (LP, unreleased, 2000)

1. Asia At Odd Hours
2. A Charming Spell (Symbion remix)
3. Trophy Hunter (Demo)
4. 50% (Jez Collin remix)
5. Lost Frontier (Demo)
6. All Things (Symbion remix)
7. Karma Slave
8. 50% (Jez Collin Dub remix)
9. Over The Wall (Demo)
10. Sugar High (Doc remix)
11. Sugar High (Rhys Fulber remix)
12. Sugar High (Bill Klatt remix)
13. Sugar High (Stryker Bros. remix)
14. Sugar High (E.P.)
15. A Charming Spell (Redshift version)
16. 50%
17. You Are (Demo)

Metamorphosis – single (2023)

Nomadic (Demo) – single (2023)
