= Future Future Future Perfect =

Studio album by Freezepop
- Released: September 25, 2007
- Genre: Synth-pop
- Label: Cordless Recordings
- Producer: The Duke of Pannekoeken

Freezepop chronology
Fancy Ultra•Fresh (2004)	Future Future Future Perfect (2007)	Imaginary Friends (2010)

Professional ratings
Review scores
Source	Rating
Allmusic	link
Stereology	link
Tiny Mix Tapes	link

Future Future Future Perfect is the third full-length studio album by Freezepop. It was released on September 25, 2007, by Cordless Recordings.

== History ==
The first details of the album were posted on April 16, 2007, on the band's MySpace blog. More details were posted on June 8, again on the band's MySpace blog. This update included the album's title and release date. On July 10, the band posted the song "Ninja of Love" on their MySpace band profile for their fans to preview.

On August 25, the band played at PAX 2007, during which they confirmed their song "Brainpower" would feature in the upcoming game Rock Band. On September 21, the album was put up in its entirety on the band's MySpace.

The limited edition release of the album comes in a foil digipak case. The band members autographed and signed them, and was limited to 2000 copies. It also contains two bonus tracks, "Get Drunk With Milk" and "Retired Tennis Pro".

The song "Pop Music is Not a Crime" is featured in the iPod-exclusive game Phase.

== Track listing ==
No.	Title	Length
1.	"Less Talk More Rokk"	4:54
2.	"Pop Music Is Not a Crime"	3:52
3.	"Frontload"	5:18
4.	"Thought Balloon"	3:21
5.	"Ninja of Love"	3:13
6.	"Brainpower"	2:10
7.	"Do You Like My Wang™?"	4:16
8.	"He Says, She Says"	5:15
9.	"Do You Like Boys?"	3:03
10.	"Swimming Pool"	6:56
11.	"Afterparty"	4:11
12.	"Smoke Machine" (Storslagen Mix (iTunes Deluxe Edition bonus track))	6:53

=== European edition ===
No.	Title	Length
1.	"Less Talk More Rokk"	4:54
2.	"Pop Music Is Not a Crime"	3:52
3.	"Frontload"	5:18
4.	"Thought Balloon"	3:21
5.	"Get Drunk with Milk"	4:29
6.	"Ninja of Love"	3:13
7.	"Brainpower"	2:10
8.	"He Says, She Says"	5:15
9.	"I Think Best In Wire"	4:41
10.	"Do You Like Boys?"	3:03
11.	"Swimming Pool"	6:56
12.	"Afterparty" (Storslagen Mix)	6:44
13.	"Smoke Machine"	6:53

=== Limited edition ===
No.	Title	Length
1.	"Less Talk More Rokk"	4:54
2.	"Pop Music Is Not a Crime"	3:52
3.	"Frontload"	5:18
4.	"Thought Balloon"	3:21
5.	"Get Drunk with Milk"	4:29
6.	"Ninja of Love"	3:13
7.	"Brainpower"	2:10
8.	"Do You Like My Wang™?"	4:16
9.	"He Says, She Says"	5:15
10.	"Do You Like Boys?"	3:03
11.	"Retired Tennis Pro"	4:17
12.	"Swimming Pool" (Extended Mix)	6:56
13.	"Afterparty"	6:44

== In popular culture ==
- "Swimming Pool" was featured prominently during a Season 5 episode of The L Word.
- "Less Talk More Rokk" is an unlockable bonus track in the video game Guitar Hero II.
- "Less Talk More Rokk" is featured in the video game Rock Band Unplugged.
- "Brainpower" is featured as an unlockable song in the video game Rock Band.
- "Frontload" was featured as the fourth-season finale of MTV's The Hills.
