= Rock Band Unplugged =

2009 video game

- Developers: Harmonix; Backbone Entertainment
- Publisher: MTV Games
- Series: Rock Band
- Platform: PlayStation Portable
- Release: NA: June 9, 2009; UK: June 19, 2009
- Genre: Rhythm
- Mode: Single-player

Rock Band Unplugged is a 2009 rhythm game developed by Harmonix in partnership with Backbone Entertainment, published by MTV Games, and distributed by Electronic Arts for the PlayStation Portable. It is the third installment in the Rock Band series and the first to be exclusively developed for a handheld console. The game was released in North America and Europe in June 2009.

The core game is functionally similar to the note-matching gameplay of Harmonix's previous titles, Frequency and Amplitude, with the player responsible for playing all four instruments—lead and bass guitar, drums, and vocals—using the Portable's controls. Game modes are similar to Rock Band's, and the soundtrack includes a number of songs that have already been a part of the Rock Band series. Additional tracks will be a time-limited exclusive to Unplugged before they are released as downloadable content for the console games. The game supports the addition of new songs that can be purchased through the PlayStation Store.

Rock Band Unplugged, in addition to being released separately, was also released as part of a "Limited Edition Entertainment Pack" that also includes a Rock Band Unplugged-branded PSP, a 4GB memory card, and a voucher to download the movie School of Rock. A voucher for an exclusive 5-song demo of Rock Band Unplugged that is compatible with downloadable content was included with the PSP Go.

== Gameplay ==
The player must repeatedly switch between four different instruments to complete a song.

The main gameplay modes in Rock Band Unplugged are similar to that of the console versions of the game. In Tour mode, the player creates a customized band, plays sets of songs at venues around the world, earning cash and fame, and unlocking new vehicles, venues, and staff. Songs completed in Tour mode then become available in Quick Play mode, which allows any song to be played without the need to create a band.

Songs in Rock Band Unplugged feature tracks for the same four instruments as in Rock Band: lead guitar, bass guitar, drums, and vocals. During the Quick Play and Tour modes, gameplay is similar to Harmonix' previous games Frequency and Amplitude: The player presses combinations of buttons on the PSP to match notes in time with the rhythm of the currently-selected instrument. After completing a phrase without missing any notes, the instrument continues to play automatically for a set amount of time, allowing the player to switch to another instrument using the shoulder buttons. Successfully completing multiple phrases in a row builds a score multiplier, as well as allowing the song to play in its entirety. Not completing a phrase in a track for an extended period of time will drain the Crowd Meter for that instrument, eventually causing the instrument to fail. A failed track will eventually cause the entire band to fail if not saved in time.

Overdrive is handled similarly to the main Rock Band series. By hitting certain white-colored sections of notes placed throughout a song, the player fills the Energy Meter. Once the meter is at least half full, the player may press down on the D-pad or X to activate Overdrive, which revives all failed instruments and enables a temporary state that boosts the score multiplier and slows the degradation of the Crowd Meter for all instruments. During solos, the player is automatically switched to the appropriate instrument; each note is scored individually, and the phrasing and track-switching elements do not apply until the solo is over.

Two additional modes, Band Survival Mode and Warmup Mode, are included in the "Extras" section of the game. In both modes, notes are scored individually, instead of being divided into phrases. Tracks will not play automatically, causing the Crowd Meter for unselected instruments to continually drop in Band Survival Mode. In Warmup Mode, only the currently-selected track is affected by missed notes. No multiplayer mode is included in the game.

The Nintendo DS version of Rock Band 3 and Lego Rock Band feature identical gameplay to Unplugged.

== Soundtrack ==
Rock Band Unplugged features 41 tracks, all of them master recordings, chosen from the songs present in Rock Band 2 and those present in the main games' Music Store. The game uses the PSP's Wi-Fi capabilities to provide additional downloadable content from music providers through the PlayStation Store. Players can also download new tracks to the PSP through the PC version of the PlayStation Store. Ten songs were made available for download on the day of the game's release, and two new songs were released each week until November 19, 2009, when further DLC development was cancelled; Harmonix, while stating that Unplugged has "run through [its] planned state", has not ruled out future downloadable content but are presently focused on other Rock Band projects. There is no cross-compatibility between music libraries for Rock Band Unplugged and the console versions of Rock Band, nor any interaction with the PlayStation 3 version of either Rock Band game.

The songs included in the game are as follows:

Song title	Artist	Decade	Genre	Song length
"3's & 7's"	Queens of the Stone Age	2000s	Alternative	03:34
"ABC"	Jackson 5	1970s	Pop/Rock	02:55
"Ace of Spades '08"	Motörhead	1980s	Metal	02:49
"Alive"	Pearl Jam	1990s	Grunge	05:40
"Aqualung"	Jethro Tull	1970s	Progressive	06:34
"Buddy Holly"	Weezer	1990s	Alternative	02:40
"Carry On Wayward Son"	Kansas	1970s	Progressive	05:26
"Chop Suey!"	System of a Down	2000s	Nu-Metal	03:30
"Come Out and Play (Keep Em Separated)"	The Offspring	1990s	Punk	03:17
"De-Luxe"	Lush	1990s	Alternative	03:29
"Drain You"	Nirvana	1990s	Grunge	03:43
"Everlong"	Foo Fighters	1990s	Alternative	04:50
"Float On"	Modest Mouse	2000s	Indie Rock	03:28
"Gasoline"	Audioslave	2000s	Rock	04:39
"Holiday in Cambodia"	Dead Kennedys	1980s	Punk	04:38
"I Was Wrong"	Social Distortion	1990s	Punk	03:58
"The Killing Jar"	Siouxsie and the Banshees	1980s	Pop/Rock	04:04
"Kryptonite"	3 Doors Down	1990s	Rock	03:56
"Laid To Rest"	Lamb of God	2000s	Metal	03:50
"Less Talk More Rokk"	Freezepop	2000s	Pop/Rock	04:59
"Livin' on a Prayer"	Bon Jovi	1980s	Rock	04:12
"Message in a Bottle"	The Police	1980s	Rock	04:50
"The Middle"	Jimmy Eat World	2000s	Pop/Rock	02:46
"Miss Murder"	AFI	2000s	Alternative	03:26
"More than a Feeling"	Boston	1970s	Classic Rock	04:45
"Move Along"	All-American Rejects	2000s	Emo	04:00
"Mr. Brightside"	The Killers	2000s	Alternative	03:42
"My Own Worst Enemy"	Lit	1990s	Pop/Rock	02:49
"Our Truth"	Lacuna Coil	2000s	Metal	03:47
"Painkiller"	Judas Priest	1990s	Metal	06:06
"The Perfect Drug"	Nine Inch Nails	1990s	Rock	05:15
"Pinball Wizard"	The Who	1960s	Classic Rock	03:01
"Rock Your Socks"	Tenacious D	2000s	Rock	03:33
"Show Me the Way"	Black Tide	2000s	Metal	03:59
"Spoonman"	Soundgarden	1990s	Grunge	04:06
"Today"	The Smashing Pumpkins	1990s	Alternative	03:19
"The Trees" (Vault Edition)	Rush	1970s	Progressive	04:54
"What's My Age Again?"	Blink-182	1990s	Punk	02:28
"Where'd You Go?"	The Mighty Mighty Bosstones	1990s	Alternative	03:27
"White Wedding, Part 1"	Billy Idol	1980s	Rock	03:30
"Would?"	Alice in Chains	1990s	Grunge	03:27

The songs included in the Rock Band Unplugged Starter Pack are as follows:

Song title	Artist	Decade	Genre
"Everlong"	Foo Fighters	1990s	Alternative
"ABC"	Jackson 5	1970s	Pop/Rock
"Buddy Holly"	Weezer	1990s	Alternative
"Ace of Spades '08"	Motörhead	1980s	Metal
"What's My Age Again?"	Blink-182	1990s	Punk

=== Downloadable content ===
Song title	Artist	Decade	Genre	Release date	Song length
"Crushcrushcrush"	Paramore	2000s	Pop/Rock	June 4, 2009	03:05
"Feed the Tree"	Belly	1990s	Alternative	June 4, 2009	03:30
"Gimme Three Steps"	Lynyrd Skynyrd	1970s	Southern Rock	June 4, 2009	04:45
"Hysteria"	Muse	2000s	Alternative	June 4, 2009	03:46
"Inside the Fire"	Disturbed	2000s	Nu-Metal	June 4, 2009	03:37
"Just a Girl"	No Doubt	1990s	Pop/Rock	June 4, 2009	03:17
"The Kill"	Thirty Seconds to Mars	2000s	Pop/Rock	June 4, 2009	04:06
"Typical"	Mutemath	2000s	Alternative	June 4, 2009	04:12
"Under The Bridge"	Red Hot Chili Peppers	1990s	Alternative	June 4, 2009	04:26
"Wonderwall"	Oasis	1990s	Rock	June 4, 2009	04:21
"Constant Motion"	Dream Theater	2000s	Progressive	June 11, 2009	06:57
"Sex Type Thing"	Stone Temple Pilots	1990s	Alternative	June 11, 2009	03:38
"Afterlife"	Avenged Sevenfold	2000s	Metal	June 25, 2009	05:36
"Dr. Feelgood"	Mötley Crüe	1980s	Metal	June 25, 2009	04:53
"Sin Wagon"	Dixie Chicks	1990s	Country	July 2, 2009	03:37
"Losing My Religion"	R.E.M.	1990s	Alternative	July 2, 2009	04:27
"Still Alive"	GLaDOS and Jonathan Coulton	2000s	Pop/Rock	July 9, 2009	02:57
"Here Comes Your Man"	The Pixies	1980s	Alternative	July 9, 2009	03:17
"Pride and Joy"	Stevie Ray Vaughan	1980s	Blues	July 9, 2009	03:40
"My Curse"	Killswitch Engage	2000s	Metal	July 16, 2009	04:11
"My Iron Lung"	Radiohead	1990s	Alternative	July 16, 2009	04:39
"Casey Jones"	Grateful Dead	1970s	Classic Rock	July 23, 2009	04:24
"The Boys Are Back In Town (Live)"	Thin Lizzy	1970s	Classic Rock	July 23, 2009	04:27
"Funk #49"	James Gang	1970s	Classic Rock	July 30, 2009	04:10
"Smooth Criminal"	Alien Ant Farm	2000s	Rock	July 30, 2009	03:27
"Had a Dad"	Jane's Addiction	1980s	Alternative	August 6, 2009	03:49
"Renegade"	Styx	1970s	Classic Rock	August 6, 2009	04:18
"The Number of the Beast (Original Version)"	Iron Maiden	1980s	Metal	August 13, 2009	04:48
"The Trooper"	Iron Maiden	1980s	Metal	August 13, 2009	04:14
"Heartbreaker"	Pat Benatar	1970s	Classic Rock	August 20, 2009	03:31
"A Favor House Atlantic"	Coheed and Cambria	2000s	Progressive	August 20, 2009	03:15
"She's Not There"	The Zombies	1960s	Pop-Rock	August 27, 2009	02:23
"Black Sunshine"	White Zombie	1990s	Metal	August 27, 2009	04:13
"Lucid Dreams"	Franz Ferdinand	2000s	Alternative	September 3, 2009	03:32
"Riad N' the Bedouins"	Guns N' Roses	2000s	Rock	September 3, 2009	03:36
"I Stand Alone"	Godsmack	2000s	Nu-Metal	September 10, 2009	03:54
"Love Spreads"	The Stone Roses	1990s	Alternative	September 10, 2009	05:48
"Bring Me to Life"	Evanescence	2000s	Nu-Metal	September 17, 2009	03:54
"Back from the Dead"	Spinal Tap	2000s	Rock	September 17, 2009	03:59
"Wake Up Dead"	Megadeth	1980s	Metal	September 24, 2009	03:40
"Flathead"	The Fratellis	2000s	Alternative	September 24, 2009	03:17
"Monkey Wrench"	Foo Fighters	1990s	Alternative	October 1, 2009	03:56
"Lonely as You"	Foo Fighters	2000s	Alternative	October 1, 2009	04:41
"Know Your Enemy"	Green Day	2000s	Rock	October 8, 2009	03:12
"Red Barchetta"	Rush	1980s	Progressive	October 8, 2009	06:23
"Jeremy"	Pearl Jam	1990s	Grunge	October 15, 2009	05:13
"Headknocker"	Foreigner	1970s	Classic Rock	October 15, 2009	03:23
"The Rock Show"	Blink-182	2000s	Punk	October 22, 2009	02:52
"All I Want"	The Offspring	1990s	Punk	October 22, 2009	01:55
"Kool Thing"	Sonic Youth	1990s	Alternative	October 29, 2009	04:07
"My Old School"	Steely Dan	1970s	Classic Rock	October 29, 2009	05:45
"Waking the Demon"	Bullet for My Valentine	2000s	Metal	November 5, 2009	04:08
"Toxicity"	System of a Down	2000s	Nu-Metal	November 5, 2009	03:45
"Excuse Me Mr."	No Doubt	1990s	Pop Rock	November 12, 2009	03:06
"I'm Shipping Up to Boston"	Dropkick Murphys	2000s	Punk	November 12, 2009	02:35
"California Über Alles"	Dead Kennedys	1980s	Punk	November 19, 2009	03:31
"You're No Rock N' Roll Fun"	Sleater-Kinney	2000s	Indie Rock	November 19, 2009	02:31

Currently, "Toxicity", "Under the Bridge", "Back from the Dead", and "Smooth Criminal" are no longer available through the PlayStation Network store.

== Band Unplugged Lite ==
On March 10, 2010, Rock Band Unplugged Lite was released on the PlayStation Network, which is a downloadable version of the game. The Lite version includes the 5 Starter Pack songs, but can accept all downloadable content (DLC). The in-game Music Store enables users to download any of the original Rock Band Unplugged songs for the same price as the existing downloadable songs. Original Rock Band Unplugged songs can only be purchased through the in-game Music Store, while additional DLC songs can be purchased from either the PlayStation Store or the in-game Music Store. The lite version was removed at one point from the PlayStation store.

== Reception ==
Reception

Aggregate scores
Aggregator	Score
GameRankings	81%
Metacritic	81/100

Review scores
Publication	Score
1Up.com	B−
Eurogamer	8/10
Game Informer	8/10
GameSpot	8/10
GameTrailers	8.1/10
IGN	8.2/10

Rock Band Unplugged was met with generally positive reviews. The game's gameplay was praised, likening it to the success of Harmonix' previous games Frequency and Amplitude, and called a "unexpectedly nostalgic pleasure". It was further considered a general improvement on the standard Rock Band gameplay format, "adding a new level of depth for veteran players", and that by being in control of all parts of the band, the player would be more connected to their virtual band than in the console versions. Reviewers praised the use of sound, particularly the slight volume emphasis given to the current instrument that is being played, though recommended the use of headphones to overcome the poor speaker quality of the PSP unit. The choice of control scheme was also praised, which avoided introducing too many difficult button combinations on the PSP unit. The game's difficulty was also noted to be well-balanced both between songs and individual difficulty levels.

Reviewers noted that the "World Tour" mode of the game suffered the same problems that both Rock Band games had when they were first released, in that without additional content, the player would be likely playing the same song several times over as they progress through the tour. The lack of multiplayer or online leaderboards for Rock Band Unplugged was considered its largest weakness. IGN's Greg Miller lamented that unlike the social nature of Rock Band on consoles, the lack of such interaction cooperative or competitively with a second player leaves little reason to come back to the game or purchase additional content. GameSpot's Carolyn Petit, in considering the success of the multiplayer aspects of the other Rock Band titles, considered the omission "baffling". The cost of additional downloadable content, even in consideration of it being more of the same that already exists in the Rock Band series, remains the same, from $0.99 to $1.99 a song. Reviewers also criticized the need to repurchase such downloadable content for the game, with no way to reuse existing PlayStation 3 Rock Band content with the PSP game.
