= Kodomo (musician) =

American musician

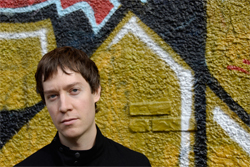
- Chris Child in 2008

Background information
- Born: Chris Child
- Genres: Electronic music, IDM
- Occupation: Musician
- Years active: 2001–present
- Label: 5 Points
- Website: chrischild.com

Kodomo is the moniker of Chris Child, an Emmy award-winning American musician. As Kodomo, he is best known for his work on the Harmonix video games Amplitude and Frequency as well as the iPod game Phase, which features his song "Spira Mirabilis".

As of 2024, Kodomo has released five studio albums: Still Life (2008), Frozen in Motion (2011), Patterns & Light (2014), Three Spheres (2021), and Pieces for Piano Vol. 2 (2024). He has also published the EPs Divider (2017), Pieces for Piano Vol. 1 (2019), Seer (2022), and Epocha (2024).

In addition to his own work, Kodomo has remixed songs by other artists, such as Dead Radar, Xandy Barry, and Sarah Fimm. In the 2000s, he mixed several songs by the synthpop band Freezepop, including "テニス の ボイフレンド", "Super-Sprøde", and "Less Talk More Rokk".

== Discography ==
Studio albums

- Still Life (2008)
- Frozen in Motion (2011)
- Patterns & Light (2014)
- Three Spheres (2021)
- Pieces for Piano Vol. 2 (2024)

EPs

- Divider (2017)
- Pieces for Piano Vol. 1 (2019)
- Seer (2022)
- Epocha (2024)

Remix albums

- Concept 11 Remixes (2008)
- Divider Remixes (2017)
- Three Spheres (Remixes) (2022)

Singles

- "Spira Mirabilis" (2007)
- "Concept 11" (2008)
- "Decoder" (2011)
- "Mind Like a Diamond" (2014)
- "Haze" (2023)
- "Regret" (2023)
- "Unrosive" (2023)
- "Trenta Trenta" (2024)
