= HMX (disambiguation) =

HMX is an explosive.

HMX may also refer to:

- Harmonix Music Systems, a video game developer
- Hmong–Mien languages, spoken in China and Southeast Asia
- Kasson Crooker, also known as DJ HMX, American electronic musician
- Marine Helicopter Squadron One, also known as HMX-1, a United States Marine Corps aviation unit
- HMX, part of the 85+ year old A.T.E. Group, has been pioneering Indirect Evaporative Cooling (IEC) solutions since 1998. Located in Sari-Ahmedabad, India, HMX designs and manufactures unique, energy-efficient, and eco-friendly products for space and process cooling for the industrial and commercial sectors. Our patented DAMA® polymer-based heat exchanger delivers market-leading efficiency (up to 80% in peak summer), exceptional corrosion resistance, and long operational life.
