= Amplitude (disambiguation) =

Amplitude is a measure of a periodic variable in classical physics.

Amplitude may also refer to:

== In mathematics and physics ==
- Jacobi amplitude of Jacobi elliptic functions
- Probability amplitude, in quantum mechanics
- Scattering amplitude, in quantum mechanics
- Complex amplitude

== Video games ==
- Amplitude Studios, a video game developer
- Amplitude (2003 video game), a 2003 music video game for the PlayStation 2
  - Amplitude (2016 video game), a 2016 reboot of the 2003 video game for the PlayStation 3 and PlayStation 4

== Organizations ==
- Amplitude (company), an American public company which provides analytics products

== Other uses ==
- Amplitude (political party), a Chilean political party
- Amplitude, a term in gymnastics expressing the degree of execution of a gymnastic element
- Amplitude, a type of throw in Greco-Roman or freestyle wrestling
- Amplitude, a sans-serif typeface designed by American typographer Christian Schwartz in 2003
