= Fancy Ultra Fresh =

Fancy Ultra•Fresh

Studio album by Freezepop
- Released: April 20, 2004
- Genre: Synth-pop
- Length: 56:23
- Label: The Archenemy Record Company
- Producer: The Duke

Freezepop chronology
Hi-Five My Remix (2003)	Fancy Ultra•Fresh (2004)	Mini Ultra•Fresh (2004)

Alternative cover
- Limited edition liquid-pack CD packaging

Professional ratings
Review scores
Source	Rating
AllMusic	4/5 stars
PopMatters	favorable

Fancy Ultra•Fresh is the second studio album by American electronic band Freezepop. It was released on April 20, 2004 by The Archenemy Record Company.

The enhanced CD features a set of audio visualizers playable with the album, a link to the official Freezepop website, the bonus song "#1 Song in Heaven" and three videos, including a flash video for "Stakeout", a live television performance of "Bike Thief" from The Top Shelf Variety Hour and a "Freezepop on Tour" featurette.

A limited edition release of the album had the CD encased in a lime green gel liquid-pack.

The robotic voice spelling the word "Freezepop" at the beginning of "I Am Not Your Gameboy" was produced by a Speak & Spell. The album's hidden track is a cover of the theme song to animated series Jem.

Remixed versions of "Stakeout" and "Bike Thief" appear in the video games Dance Dance Revolution Ultramix 3 and Downhill Domination, respectively. The song "I Am Not Your Gameboy" appears in Guitar Hero: On Tour.

There is a remixed version of the song "Manipulate", which previously appeared in their EP, Fashion Impression Function.

== Track listing ==
All tracks are written by Kasson Crooker and Jussi Gamache, except where noted.

No.	Title	Writer(s)	Length
1.	"Stakeout"		3:17
2.	"Bike Thief"		3:53
3.	"I Am Not Your Gameboy"		3:49
4.	"Parlez-Vous Freezepop?"		5:16
5.	"Chess King"	Crooker	4:40
6.	"Outer Space"		5:05
7.	"That Boy Is All About Fun!"		4:37
8.	"Duct Tape My Heart"		4:58
9.	"Manipulate" (Mastermind Mix)	Crooker, Gamache, Sean T. Drinkwater	5:05
10.	"Emotions & Photons"	Crooker	4:25
11.	"Tonight"		4:50
12.	"Boys on Film"		4:21
13.	"Jem Theme" (hidden track)		2:07

== Personnel ==
- The Duke – producer, engineer, mixing
- Jussi Gamache – design
- Dave Locke – mastering
- Violet Shuraka – photography
