= Brainpower (song) =

Song by Freezepop

from the album Future Future Future Perfect
- Released: September 25, 2007
- Genre: Synthpop
- Length: 2:10
- Label: Cordless Recordings
- Songwriter: Sean T. Drinkwater
- Producer: Kasson Crooker

"Brainpower" is a song by the synthpop band Freezepop. It is the sixth track on the non limited edition of the band's third album, Future Future Future Perfect, and seventh on the limited edition of the album. The song appears as a bonus track in the music video game Rock Band.

According to Liz Enthusiasm, the song is a true story, and is based on a time she became drunk and decided that "Brainpower" would be a good idea for a band name, only to then change her mind. According to Sean T. Drinkwater, there is allegedly an allegory in the song.

The music video for the song was directed by Mega64 and posted on YouTube on March 4, 2008. In it, the band performs the song live on a low-budget cable show while a young viewer (portrayed by Frank Howley) uses a special remote to alter the reality of the performance on his TV.
