= Robotron =

Robotron may refer to:

== Arts and entertainment ==
- Robotron: 2084, an arcade video game (1982)
  - Robotron X, a PlayStation 1 video game (1996)
  - Robotron 64, a Nintendo 64 video game (1998)
- Robotron, a planet from The Robo Machines (comics)
- "Robotron 2000", a 2000 song by Freezepop from Freezepop Forever
  - "Robotron 2002", a 2002 remix on Fashion Impression Function
- The monsters of the week from Power Rangers Beast Morphers

== Companies ==
- VEB Robotron, an East German computer company, part of which is now Robotron Datenbank-Software GmbH
- Robotron Group, an Australian high technology company
