= Hi-Five My Remix =

Remix album by Freezepop
- Released: 2003
- Recorded: 2002
- Genre: Synth-pop
- Label: Archemeny

Freezepop chronology
| Fashion Impression Function (2001) | Hi-Five My Remix (2003) | Fancy Ultra•Fresh (2004) |

Professional ratings
Review scores
| Source | Rating |
|---|---|
| AllMusic | 3/5 stars |

Hi-Five My Remix is a 2003 remix album featuring the music of Freezepop. Though hard copies of the album are currently out of print, the album is available through iTunes and other digital download services.

Half of the tracks on the album are remixed versions of the song "Super-Sprøde". "Super-Sprøde" appears in the video game Amplitude, while a remixed version titled "Sprode" is available as downloadable content for Rock Band. The January 2009 issue of PlayStation: The Official Magazine lists Freezepop's "Sprode" as first on a list of Rock Band’s "Five Most Unexpectedly Rockin' Downloadable Songs."

== Track listing ==
| No. | Title | Length |
|---|---|---|
| 1. | "Super-Sprøde" | 3:30 |
| 2. | "Super-Sprøde" (Future Bible Heroes remix) | 5:50 |
| 3. | "Tracey Gold" (Fairlight Children remix) | 4:43 |
| 4. | "Super-Sprøde" (Kodomo remix) | 5:19 |
| 5. | "Super-Sprøde" (Bunnyhug remix) | 3:34 |
| 6. | "Bike Thief" (Tubeway remix) | 3:37 |
| 7. | "Super-Sprøde" (Veronica Black Morpheus remix) | 3:25 |
| 8. | "Super-Sprøde" (Pure remix) | 3:59 |
| 9. | "Lazy" (Bass Kittens remix) | 5:38 |
| 10. | "Stakeout" (Donnerschlag remix) | 4:08 |
| 11. | "Super-Sprøde" (Super-death remix) | 4:53 |
| 12. | "Freezepop Forever" (Ionian remix) | 3:44 |
