= Fashion Impression Function =

EP by Freezepop
- Released: 2001
- Genre: Synth-pop
- Length: 41:52
- Label: Archenemy
- Producer: The Duke of Candied Apples

Freezepop chronology
Freezepop Forever (2000)	Fashion Impression Function (2001)	Hi-Five My Remix (2003)

Professional ratings
Review scores
Source	Rating
PopMatters	(favorable)

Fashion Impression Function is an EP by the American synth-pop band Freezepop, released in 2001 by Archenemy Record Company. Tracks 5, 7, 8 and 9 are remixed versions of songs found on the band's debut album Freezepop Forever (2000). A "Mastermind Mix" of the song "Manipulate" later appeared on the album Fancy Ultra Fresh (2004). Fashion Impression Function was remastered and re-released in 2007 in a digipak case and featuring two additional songs.

== Track listing ==
No.	Title	Writer(s)	Length
1.	"Manipulate"	The Duke of Candied Apples, The Other Sean T. Drinkwater, Liz Enthusiasm	4:03
2.	"Lazy"	Duke, Enthusiasm	4:57
3.	"Shark Attack"	Duke	4:16
4.	"Starlight"	Duke, Drinkwater, Enthusiasm	4:38
5.	"テニス の ボイフレンド" (Komodo Mix)	Duke, Enthusiasm	6:49
6.	"Manipulate" (Machinate Mix)	Duke, Drinkwater, Enthusiasm	4:12
7.	"Robotron 2002" (All Your Base Are Belong to Us Remix)	Duke, Enthusiasm	3:42
8.	"Plastic Stars" (Commodore Vic's Sleeping Dogs Mix)	Duke	4:22
9.	"Science Genius Girl" (Robotkid's Lameboy Mix)	Duke, Enthusiasm	2:29
10.	"Sprite: Melonball Bounce" (Hidden Track)	Raymond Scott	2:14

- The enhanced CD also includes the videos for "Freezepop Forever" and "Tender Lies".

2007 bonus tracks
No.	Title	Length
10.	"Starlight" (Karacter Re-Vision Remix)	5:02
11.	"Freezepop Forever" (Kodomo Remix)	5:13

- On this edition, "Melonball Bounce" has been moved to track 12.

== Personnel ==
Credits adapted from CD liner notes.

Freezepop

- The Duke of Candied Apples
- Liz Enthusiasm
- The Other Sean T. Drinkwater

Technical

- The Duke of Candied Apples – engineer, mixing, mastering, producer
- Jussi Gamache – design, art direction, "Freezepop Forever" video
- Rick Webb – photography; editor ("Tender Lies" video)
- Sean T. Drinkwater – director ("Tender Lies" video)
- Chris Childs – remixing (5)
- Intersect – remixing (6)
- DJ Nebula – remixing (7)
- Commodore Vic – remixing (8)
- Robotkid – remixing (9)
