= Mini Ultra Fresh =

Mini Ultra•Fresh

EP by Freezepop
- Released: 2004
- Genre: Synth-pop
- Label: Archenemy

Freezepop chronology
Fancy Ultra•Fresh (2004)	Mini Ultra•Fresh (2004)	Maxi Ultra•Fresh (2005)

Mini Ultra•Fresh is a 2004 remix EP promo featuring various songs of Freezepop. The EP was made to promote their future album Maxi Ultra•Fresh. The four songs in this album are four of the eleven songs used in Maxi Ultra•Fresh.

== Track listing ==
No.	Title	Writer(s)	Length
1.	"Stakeout"		3:18
2.	"Parlez-vous Freezepop?" (Misprinted as "Bike Thief" on back cover)		517
3.	"Emotions & Photons"		4:25
4.	"Photographic"	V. Clarke	4:12
