= Near Infinite Possibility =

Studio album by Sarah Fimm
- Released: 2011
- Genre: Pop rock
- Length: 48:30
- Label: Self-released
- Producer: Sarah Fimm

Sarah Fimm chronology
| Karma Phala (2010) | Near Infinite Possibility (2011) |

Professional ratings
Review scores
| Source | Rating |
|---|---|
| Sputnikmusic | 4.5/5 stars |

Near Infinite Possibility is the fifth studio album released by American singer-songwriter Sarah Fimm.

== Critical reception ==
Trey Spencer of Sputnikmusic gave the album four and a half stars, writing:

When Red Yellow Sun was released people naturally assumed that it was the end result of Sarah's vision for her music, myself included, but we were wrong. Near Infinite Possibility proves that there probably isn't a true end result in Sarah Fimm's mind, just a natural and continuous progression that will continue to twist and turn in unexpected ways.

In her review for Chronogram, Sharon Nichols wrote:

Song after dynamic song, this record is a gut-punch—perhaps it will encourage new listeners to check out her sumptuous early work. Near Infinite Possibility, however, is the cherry on top of all that went before it.

== Track listing ==
All tracks written by Sarah Fimm. The album's track listing can be obtained from Allmusic.

| No. | Title | Length |
|---|---|---|
| 1. | "Soul Let Swim" | 4:09 |
| 2. | "Invisible Satellites" | 3:43 |
| 3. | "Closer" | 3:24 |
| 4. | "Yellow" | 3:31 |
| 5. | "Say No More" | 3:12 |
| 6. | "Terrified" | 3:55 |
| 7. | "Disappear" | 3:41 |
| 8. | "Up From Dust" | 3:52 |
| 9. | "Sing" | 2:47 |
| 10. | "Forgive Me" | 3:58 |
| 11. | "Everything Becomes Whole" | 3:01 |
| 12. | "Flames" | 4:55 |
| 13. | "Morning Time" | 4:22 |
