= Chop Chop (band) =

American singer-songwriter

- Origin: Los Angeles, California
- Genres: Electropop
- Labels: Archenemy
- Members: Catherine Cavanagh; Christy Cheng
- Past members: Carla Ceruzzi
- Website: http://www.chopchopmusic.com/

Chop Chop is an electropop band out of Los Angeles, California, founded in Boston, Massachusetts, and is on the Archenemy Record Company, home to such acts as Freezepop, Lifestyle, The Texas Governor, Rockets Burst from the Streetlamps, and Karacter.

== History ==
The band was originally a trio centered on Catherine Cavanagh. The band's debut, self-titled album was recorded in Cavanagh's attic apartment, with Cavanagh composing, arranging, playing guitars, drum machines, keyboards, and bass. The album also includes rhythms based on the sounds of a freight train moving and stopping. The album mixed guitar pop with electronics, and gained comparisons with artists such as Ladytron, with one reviewer describing it as "a truly inspired affair, raw in its approach and pure in its intent, a must-have for any fan of indie music with a distinct personality". PopMatters called the album "melodic, quirky and highly likeable" in one review but "a project that should've stayed in the bedroom" in another.

The other members of the band initially were Christy Cheng (keyboards), and Carla Ceruzzi (bass). All three members had the initials "CC", hence the band's name. Ceruzzi is no longer with the band, and in live performances, drummer Seth Damascus-Kennedy is added, working under the stage name "Carlos Cola".

The second album, Screens, was released in 2008. The Eugene Weekly described it as "mixing up its approaches to [electropop] but virtually nailing it, track after track".

== Albums ==
- Chop Chop (2006) Archenemy
- Screens (2008) Archenemy
- The Spark (2011) Archenemy

== TV Licensing ==
- "Pinched" -Bachelor Party (How I Met Your Mother)
- "Play" -The Wedding Bride (How I Met Your Mother)
