= Beats (video game) =

2007 video game

- Developer: London Studio
- Publisher: Sony Computer Entertainment
- Platform: PlayStation Portable
- Release: EU: November 20, 2007; NA: December 6, 2007
- Genre: Music video game
- Mode: Single player

Beats is a 2007 rhythm video game developed by London Studio and published by Sony Computer Entertainment for the PlayStation Portable. It was released on the PlayStation Store.

== Description ==
In addition to downloading music from the Internet, users may also use their own music to play along to in the My Music Challenge mode. Beats automatically loads the track titles and artist names of the songs it finds on the user's PSP. However, the game will only read up to 127 tracks for the user to choose from. There is as yet no explanation from Sony for this limitation, nor is it obvious how the game determines which 127 tracks are loaded from the library. (What is known is that the game loads the same set of tracks from the user's /MUSIC directory each time.)

During the game, three stationary targets, or landing points, (just one in Novice mode) are spaced evenly at the center of the screen. Symbols appear from off the screen and glide towards these targets in rhythm with the music. The symbols represent notes that players are meant to synchronize their button presses to and are identified by the four PlayStation face buttons: circle, "x", square, and triangle. These notes are generated based on the rhythm of the music using a beat tracking algorithm. While often occurring on the beat, notes can also occur off the beat at times. Tracks with greater emphasis on rhythm, especially techno songs with a strong, well-defined beat or powerful bass lines, generate the best in-game beat patterns.

The objective of the game is to hit the corresponding face button as each note glides onto its landing point. The better the player's timing, the more points are given for that button press. Point multipliers are also awarded for successive correct inputs; hitting an incorrect button or missing a note will result in the point multiplier to decrease. Additionally, glowing symbols occasionally appear, and correctly hitting these notes will fill an "overdrive meter" on the left side of the screen. Once the overdrive meter is full, the player can activate "overdrive mode" which doubles the score multiplier temporarily. However, while in overdrive mode, symbols will travel diagonally and glide in from off angles instead of their normally vertical (center target) or horizontal (left & right targets) flight paths.

Additionally, Beats includes a lightweight music mixer, allowing players to make and record their own remixes using instrumental tracks from the game and from other titles, such as Team Buddies, EyeToy Kinetic and Drop Ship. Once recorded, players can share their creations with other players online. Players may also collaborate with others in online "Jamming" sessions.

Beats also comes with 70 different visualizations that play in the background in sync with the music and player actions as well as a variety of themes for the user interface.

== Release and reception ==
IGN gave the game a score of 7.0, and were impressed by the "sheer number of visualizations" on offer, but noted that despite the ability to import the player's own music, "the first five minutes of the game are just about the same as the next five hours".

== See also ==
- Phase (video game)
- AudioSurf
- Frequency (video game)
