= Phase (video game) =

2007 iPod video game

- Developer: Harmonix
- Director: Kasson Crooker
- Producer: Pete Maguire
- Designer: Chris Foster
- Programmer: Rafael Baptista
- Artist: Jason Arnone
- Platforms: 5/5.5 Gen iPod Video, 3rd Gen Nano, 4th Gen Nano 5th Gen Nano, 6th Gen Classic
- Release: November 6, 2007
- Genre: Music
- Mode: Single player

Phase is a music-themed iPod game created by Harmonix exclusively for the iPod click wheel interface. It is similar to other Harmonix games Amplitude and FreQuency.

== Gameplay ==
Phase is played in a forced single-point perspective view of a three line track. Down each line come colored circles, and the player must click the corresponding button on the click wheel when the circle reaches the bottom of the screen. The circles are arranged on the track in relation to the beat of the music track being played.

Additionally, there are occasional series of smaller, more closely spaced dots that will sweep across the track. These require the player to swipe their finger across the click wheel at the correct pace, instead of clicking the wheel buttons.

The game has easy, medium, and hard difficulty settings available for immediate play. After completing a marathon with the hard difficulty setting, the expert mode becomes available. In the same way, completing a marathon on expert unlocks insane mode. The difficulty settings control the speed of the track, the number of dots, and their point value.

Phase is compatible with the 3rd, 4th, and 5th generation iPod Nano, the 5th generation iPod, and the 6th generation iPod Classic. It does not work with the iPhone or iPod Touch.

== Soundtrack ==
Phase ships with seven songs, some by bands of Harmonix employees, but the game can utilize any song on the iPod as long as it is longer than 30 seconds but less than 30 minutes long. Custom songs must be added to a Phase playlist in iTunes, where they are processed for proper interpretation and become available in the game. The Phase music playlist is limited to 1,000 songs.

The songs included in the game are:

- "Nightlife Commando" by Bang Camaro,
- "Pop Music Is Not a Crime" by Freezepop,
- "Midnight Gamma" by Inter:sect,
- "Spira Mirabilis" by Kodomo,
- "The Theme of the Awesome" by Speck,
- "Dragonfly Remix" by Universal Hall Pass,
- "Dots and Dashes" by Dealership.

"Dots and Dashes" was originally supposed to appear on Dealership's upcoming album The Future is Far Away in 2008, but the band went on hiatus.

== Compatibility ==
Phase is compatible with the 3rd, 4th and 5th generation iPod Nano, the 5th generation iPod, and the 6th generation iPod Classic. It does not work with the iPhone or iPod Touch.

== See also ==
- iPod games
- Beats (video game)
- Audiosurf
