= Imaginary Friends (Freezepop album) =

Studio album by Freezepop
- Released: December 7, 2010
- Genre: Synth-pop

Freezepop chronology
Future Future Future Perfect (2007)	Imaginary Friends (2010)

Imaginary Friends is the fourth studio album by Freezepop, released on December 7, 2010.

AllMusic stated in its review of the album, "Even though the band is in a transitional phase here, you wouldn’t know it. Freezepop sounds more sophisticated and polished than ever."

== History ==
Imaginary Friends is the first Freezepop album to be released since the departure of The Duke of Pannekoeken and addition of Robert John "Bananas" Foster and Christmas Disco-Marie Sagan.

The album went on pre-sale on November 26, 2010. People who preordered Imaginary Friends received an "Instant Gratification Pack." This pack included five tracks: two songs from Imaginary Friends, a remix of both those songs and a B-side. Additionally, the band posted the song "Magnetic" on their website for free. Shortly before the presale went active, the song was pulled and replaced with "Doppelgänger." "Magnetic" then became one of the two songs available in the Instant Gratification Pack.

1000 copies of the album were released as a limited edition double CD with autographs from the band and an extra disc called "Secret Companion."

The songs "Doppelgänger" and "Special Effects" were released on the Rock Band Network, with both songs later being made as DLC for Rock Band 4.

== Track listing ==
No.	Title	Length
1.	"Natural Causes"	4:37
2.	"Lose That Boy"	3:26
3.	"Doppelgänger"	3:41
4.	"Special Effects"	4:06
5.	"Strange"	4:21
6.	"Magnetic"	4:20
7.	"We Don't Have Normal Lives"	4:12
8.	"Hypothetically"	3:30
9.	"Imaginary Friend"	4:26
10.	"Lady Spider"	3:20
11.	"Hot Air Balloons"	3:22
12.	"House of Mirrors"	4:59

=== Instant Gratification Pack ===
No.	Title	Length
1.	"Lose That Boy"	3:26
2.	"Lose That Boy" (Codebase Morodercycle Remix)	3:45
3.	"Magnetic"	4:20
4.	"Electromagnetic"	5:51
5.	"Antikythera Mechanism"	3:42

=== Secret Companion ===
No.	Title	Length
1.	"Side Effects"	4:25
2.	"The World Is in Love"	5:14
3.	"In Private"	3:56
4.	"I Need Answers"	3:26
5.	"I Need a Mate"	4:27
6.	"I Need Options"	4:23
7.	"Peptalk"	3:36
8.	"Frantic on Friday"	3:19
9.	"Backfired"	4:26
10.	"Lessons in the Dark"	4:00
11.	"Je Ne Sais Quoi"	3:28
12.	"The Computer's New Obsession"	3:27
