= Twitch Sings =

2019 video game

- Developer: Harmonix
- Publisher: Twitch
- Platforms: Microsoft Windows macOS
- Release: April 13, 2019
- Genre: Karaoke
- Modes: Single-player, multiplayer

Twitch Sings was a free-to-play karaoke video game developed by Harmonix and published by live streaming service Twitch. It was released on April 13, 2019 for Microsoft Windows and macOS.

Twitch Sings' servers closed on January 1, 2021. Twitch stated that they made the decision to close the game to "invest in broader tools and music services."

== Development ==
In October 2018 during TwitchCon, Twitch announced that they were developing a karaoke video game in collaboration with Harmonix. During the opening keynote, Twitch CEO Emmett Shear stated, "We believe in a new category of game that's made to be streamed, where the audience isn't just nice to have, they're crucial to the experience, where the driver's seat is big enough for your whole community. So we teamed up with Harmonix and built a game ourselves." Attendees at the convention were among the first to test out the game. An open beta would be launched later that month.

Twitch Sings was released to the public on April 13, 2019 for Microsoft Windows and macOS. Mobile versions for iOS and Android were originally planned, but was never released. Over 2,000 songs were available at launch.

On September 4, 2020, Twitch announced that they would be closing Twitch Sings by 2021. The platform removed videos and clips relating to the game on December 1, 2020, citing contractual obligations. Twitch Sings' servers were fully shut down on January 1, 2021.

== Gameplay ==
Twitch Sings featured both single-player and multiplayer game modes. The main objective of the game was to sing a song as accurately as possible. A pitch meter helped players stay on key. Players could sing solo songs live, or create a duet with a fellow creator. In order to perform a duet, a player would record one half of a song. They would later send a video of their performance to another player who sings the second half of the song. The game's software would later merge the two videos into one song. In a later update, Twitch added the ability to sing duets in real-time through a new party mode feature. Broadcasters were able to directly stream from the game. This allowed stream audiences to interact in various ways, such as voting on singing challenges for the broadcaster to attempt, along with sending in virtual ovations if they enjoyed the performance.

Players were able to adjust their game experience in a variety of ways. They could either use their webcam or a customizable avatar to represent themselves once in game. A number of different voice effects and world maps were also offered to players.
