= A City Sleeps =

2014 video game

- Steam store card
- Developer: Harmonix
- Publisher: Harmonix
- Engine: Unity
- Platforms: Windows, Mac OS X
- Release: October 16, 2014
- Genre: Scrolling shooter
- Mode: Single-player

A City Sleeps is a horizontally scrolling shooter developed by Harmonix for Windows and Mac OS X on October 16, 2014.

== Gameplay ==
A City Sleeps is a horizontally scrolling twin-stick shooter. The player controls Poe, a dream exorcist that enters the nightmares of the citizens of SanLo City to help free them of a force that controls the city. The player moves Poe around the screen with one controller stick and aims her weapon with the other to dodge the torrent of bullets the nightmare forces fire at her and defeat them with her own weapon. The player can also move Poe close to a foe, risking more damage from their bullets but allowing Poe to defeat the foe with a sword, which helps to build a special meter. Once this meter is full, the player can then trigger a special attack that affects all the enemies on the screen. The patterns of the appearance of enemies and when they fire are tightly connected to the game's soundtrack, reflecting on Harmonix' past expertise in rhythm game development.

In addition to her own abilities, Poe has a trio of "ghosts" that accompany her and that can be attached to special nodes located on the levels. Each ghost has a unique ability: one can heal Poe, another can shoot its own bullets, and the third can drain health from enemies trapped nearby. The type of node will affect how these abilities work; for example, the health-generating ghost on some nodes may end up firing health bullets that Poe can take to restore health, while other nodes may create a health restoration field near the node. The player can swap ghosts and nodes at any time, though foes will continue to fire on Poe during this process.

== Development and release ==
A City Sleeps was developed by part of the Harmonix team that worked on their first-person music-based shooter, Chroma. The title was revealed at the 2014 PAX Prime convention.

== Reception ==
Reception

Aggregate score
Aggregator	Score
Metacritic	61/100

Review scores
Publication	Score
Destructoid	5.5/10
Game Informer	8/10
GameSpot	5/10
Joystiq	3/5
Polygon	6/10
Shacknews	7/10
Slant Magazine	(average)

A City Sleeps received "mixed or average" reviews, according to the review aggregation website Metacritic.
