= Ingrid Lukas =

Estonian-Swiss singer, pianist and composer

- Born: 20 August 1984 (age 41); Tallinn, then part of Estonian SSR, Soviet Union
- Occupations: Singer, pianist and composer
- Instruments: Vocals and piano
- Website: www.ingridlukasmusic.com

Ingrid Lukas (born 1984) is an Estonian-Swiss singer-songwriter, pianist, and bandleader. She is known for blending Estonian folk music with modern electronic and pop elements, creating a unique soundscape that has gained recognition across Europe and beyond.

== Early life and education ==
Born in Estonia in 1984, Lukas moved to Switzerland at the age of 10. She later pursued a master's degree in jazz and popular singing at the Zurich University of the Arts. Expanding her expertise, she earned a further master's degree in music therapy at the Berlin University of the Arts.

Lukas began her musical journey at the age of five, learning classical piano and singing in a choir in Estonia. Her experiences during the Singing Revolution and Estonia's path to independence in 1991 influenced her view of music as a means of self-expression and liberation.

== Career ==
=== Musical career ===
Lukas has created a unique sound that blends folk, pop, and electronic music. Her work incorporates elements of Estonian folk traditions alongside modern beats and ambient indie pop. She has released five albums and performed in various locations across Europe, the Caribbean, and the USA.

She performs in solo, duo, and quartet formats. Her quartet features Diandra Russo (saxophone, backing vocals), Manuel Rindlisbacher (bass), and Ronan Skillen (percussion). The band is known for its dynamic song development and atmospheric compositions that combine urban rhythms with the serenity of Nordic landscapes.

=== Musical style and reception ===
Lukas is known for a musical style that blends folk and pop, combining Estonian folk traditions with contemporary song structures. Her work reflects her Nordic roots while incorporating modern influences, creating a folk-pop sound that evolves throughout her career.

Lukas's voice spans a range of emotions, from soft whispers to more intense expressions. Her singing is complemented by her classical piano playing, creating an emotional experience for listeners. Despite moving to Switzerland early in her career, her music maintains a connection to her Estonian roots.

== Personal life ==
Lukas resides in Zurich, Switzerland, where she continues to sing, compose, and work as a music therapist and music coach.

== Discography ==
Albums

- We Need to Repeat – (Ronin Rhythm Records, 2009)
- Silver Secrets – (Universal Music, 2011)
- Secret Weapons Part 8 – (Innervisions, 2016)
- Demimonde – (Ronin Rhythm Records, 2015)
- Elumeloodia – (Ronin Rhythm Records, 2023)
- Solitude – Metamorphosis feat. Ingrid Lukas (Double Moon Records & Jazzthing, 2009)
- No Lie – DJ Tatana feat. Ingrid Lukas (2012)

== Notable performances ==
Lukas has performed at festivals and venues, including:

- Tallinn Music Week (Estonia)
- Eurosonic Festival (Netherlands)
- The Great Escape Festival (United Kingdom)
- Museum of Music Atrium (Czech Republic)
- Kaufleuten “Ingrid Lukas meets the Zurich Chamber Orchestra” (Switzerland)
- Arena Riga (Latvia)
- Zurich meets London (United Kingdom)
- Olympic Games cultural event “Zurich Sounds” (London, UK)

== Awards ==
- 2015/2016 "Werkjahr" (career award) from the city of Zürich
