= Red Yellow Sun =

Studio album by Sarah Fimm
- Released: 2009
- Genre: Pop rock
- Length: 52:16
- Label: Self-released
- Producer: Sarah Fimm

Sarah Fimm chronology
| White Birds (2008) | Red Yellow Sun (2009) | The Vanishing Sessions (B-Sides Part I) (2009) |

Professional ratings
Review scores
| Source | Rating |
|---|---|
| Sputnikmusic | 4/5 stars |

Red Yellow Sun is the fourth studio album released by American singer-songwriter Sarah Fimm.

== Critical reception ==
Trey Spencer of Sputnikmusic awarded the album four stars, calling "it simply a stunning and emotionally warm album that has stripped the electronic elements in favor of a more organic sound."

== Track listing ==
All tracks written by David Baron/Sarah Fimm. The album's track listing can be obtained from Allmusic.

| No. | Title | Length |
|---|---|---|
| 1. | "Horizon" | 4:52 |
| 2. | "Red Yellow Sun" | 4:06 |
| 3. | "Maryjane" | 4:32 |
| 4. | "Crumbs and Broken Shells" | 5:04 |
| 5. | "Violet" | 5:09 |
| 6. | "Guardian" | 5:43 |
| 7. | "To Be Alive" | 3:18 |
| 8. | "How Does It Feel" | 3:26 |
| 9. | "Only the Sum Of" | 5:19 |
| 10. | "Levi" | 5:08 |
| 11. | "Burning" | 5:39 |
