= Universal Hall Pass =

- Origin: United States
- Genres: Alternative rock
- Years active: 2001–present
- Labels: Sneaky Records
- Members: Melissa Kaplan
- Website: http://www.universalhallpass.com

Universal Hall Pass is a one-person band formed in 2001 by Melissa R. Kaplan, formerly of Splashdown.

Universal Hall Pass's only full-length album, Mercury, was released in 2004, featuring eleven songs. In December, 2006, UHP released a six-song EP entitled Subtle Things, on which Kaplan worked with ex-bandmate Kasson Crooker. Since then, UHP has released a small number of self-produced individual tracks online.

== Discography ==
- Mercury (LP, 2004)
1. Tutelary Genius
2. Dragonfly
3. Misdirected
4. No One
5. Katrinah Josephina
6. Six-Step Dragon
7. Avatar
8. Solar/Lunar
9. Special Agent
10. Quiet Use Of Charm
11. Outro
- Subtle Things (EP, 2006)
1. Sally's Song
2. Cave Radio
3. Forms of Imprisonment
4. Avatar (Tragic Chorus Remix)
5. Dragonfly (Scarce Chaser Remix)
6. No One (CIFR Remix)
- Self-released single tracks
1. Ring of Fire
2. The Crickets Sing For Anamaria
3. Lyra
4. Sin Eater
5. de-Orbit Burn Equation
6. The Skyclimbers (October 21, 2022)
