= Sarah Fimm =

American musician

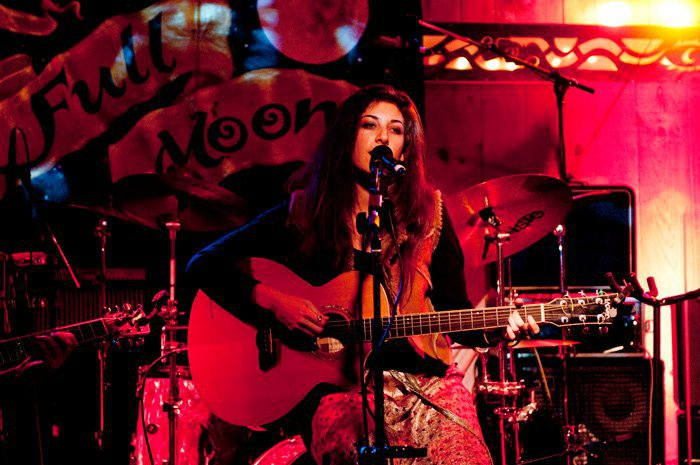
- Performing solo in 2010

Background information
- Born: Tulsa, Oklahoma, U.S.
- Instruments: vocals; piano; guitar
- Years active: 2001–present
- Website: www.sarahfimm.com

Sarah Fimm is an American singer-songwriter and multi-instrumentalist, residing in Woodstock, NY.

== Biography ==
Fimm was born in Tulsa, Oklahoma. Her grandmother is a Holocaust survivor. She toured and collaborated with singer Peter Murphy (of Bauhaus), and supported Delerium in 2008. Her music has been featured on MTV's Real World/Road Rules, Mark Hamill’s Comic Book: The Movie, D.E.B.S. (soundtrack from the motion picture), and the Lifetime channel, among others. Fimm's voice can be heard on Iggy Pops versions of Serge Gainsbourg’s ‘La Javanaise’ and ‘Et Si Tu N`Existais Pas’. Fimm plays piano, sings, and writes her own songs. She has "received continual accolades from Rolling Stone and Billboard for her stellar songwriting."

Billboard called A Perfect Dream (2002) an album that "contained a chilling, isolated beauty" and Nexus (2004) a "stunning celestial journey." Billboard compared her work on A Perfect Dream to work by Tori Amos. The Charleston Gazette echoed the comparison to Amos and wrote that Fimm is "not afraid to tell the world how she really feels."

Her work on Near Infinite Possibility (2011) (produced by David Baron) shows influences from Led Zeppelin, Pink Floyd and Heart, and featured musicians such as Josh Freese, Brian Viglione, Earl Slick, Sterling Campbell, John Andrews and others.

Fimm has been involved in outdoor art installations through an initiative called Inspire Art.

In 2015, with the help of music producer David Baron, two more albums came to fruition – Potnia Theron (2015) and Adaquarium (2015).

Given Never Offered (2018) is her latest release. The album features producer David Baron, multi-instrumentalist Erik Lawrence, bassist Sara Lee, and drummer Ben Perowsky.

== Discography ==
Year	Album
2001	Cocooned
2002	A Perfect Dream
2004	Nexus
2008	White Birds (extended play)
2009	Red Yellow Sun
2009	The Vanishing Sessions (B-Sides Part I)
2010	Karma Phala
2011	Near Infinite Possibility
2015	Potnia Theron
2015	Adaquarium
2018	Given Never Offered
2020	There Thy Beauty Lies
2020	Planting Oblivion
2022	World Lines
2022	Celestial Strangers
2022	Aletheia
2024	Lila
2024	Adeyha
2024	Earthshine
2025	Sol Oriens
2025	Anemone
