= Guitar Hero (video game) =

2005 music rhythm video game

- Cover art featuring fictional guitarist Johnny Napalm
- Developer: Harmonix
- Publisher: RedOctane
- Director: Greg LoPiccolo
- Producer: Daniel Sussman
- Designer: Rob Kay
- Programmer: Philip Winston
- Artist: Ryan Lesser
- Series: Guitar Hero
- Platform: PlayStation 2
- Release: NA: November 8, 2005; EU: April 7, 2006; AU: June 15, 2006
- Genre: Rhythm
- Modes: Single-player, multiplayer

Guitar Hero is a 2005 rhythm game developed by Harmonix and published by RedOctane for the PlayStation 2. It is the first installment in the Guitar Hero series. Guitar Hero was released in November 2005 in North America, April 2006 in Europe and June 2006 in Australia. The game's development was a result of collaboration between RedOctane and Harmonix to bring a Guitar Freaks-like game to the United States.

The game features a guitar-shaped controller (resembling a miniature Gibson SG) that the player uses to simulate playing rock music. The gameplay is similar to GuitarFreaks, in that the player presses buttons on the guitar controller in time with musical notes that scroll on the game screen. The game features covers of 30 popular rock songs spanning five decades of rock, from the 1960s up through 2005, in addition to bonus tracks. Guitar Hero became a surprise hit, earning critical acclaim and winning many awards from major video game publications, and is considered one of the most influential games of its decade. The game's success launched the Guitar Hero franchise, which has earned more than $2 billion in sales, spawning several sequels, expansions, and other game-related products.

== Gameplay ==
To play a note, the fret button and strum bar must be pressed when the solid note scrolls through the corresponding ring at the bottom. The interface shows the player's score and score multiplier (left), Star Power meter (right), and Rock Meter (bottom right).

The gameplay is similar to other music and rhythm video games, in that the player must press buttons on a game controller in time with scrolling notes on the game screen to complete a song. The basic mechanics are based on Konami's Guitar Freaks. In the case of Guitar Hero, the player may use either the guitar peripheral (a 3/4-scale reproduction of the Gibson SG guitar as bundled with the game, or a third-party version) or a standard controller to play the scrolling notes. The guitar peripheral has five different-colored fret buttons near the nut of the guitar neck, and a strum bar and a whammy bar on the body of the guitar. The peripheral also has other buttons in order to navigate the game's menus. Music is displayed on screen through a series of notes, matching in color and position to the fret buttons, that scroll down the screen on a fret board. To hit or play a note, the player must hold down the fret button corresponding to the note shown and toggle the strum bar at the same time as that note passes a marked area on the screen. Faster series of notes may be played on the guitar controller using hammer-on and pull-off techniques where the player does not need to strum each note. The game supports toggling the handedness of the guitar, allowing both left-handed and right-handed players to utilize the guitar controller. A player using the standard controller simply presses the buttons that correspond with the displayed notes as outlined in the game's manual.

The player is awarded points for correctly hitting notes, chords and sustains. The player can also increase a score multiplier by playing a series of consecutive notes successfully. A "Rock Meter" tracks the player's performance based on success or failure of hitting notes, and if the meter drops too low the song will prematurely end in failure for the player. The player can also earn "Star Power" by playing a series of glowing notes perfectly and using the whammy bar during sustains. Once the Star Power meter is filled at least halfway, Star Power can then be activated by briefly tilting the guitar controller vertically, or by pressing a specific button on a standard controller. Activating Star Power will double the scoring multiplier and makes it easier to increase the Rock Meter by playing correct notes. Thus, players can strategically use Star Power to play through difficult sections of a song they might have otherwise failed.

=== Modes and other features ===
Guitar Hero's main mode of play is Career Mode, where the player and in-game band travel between various fictional performance arenas and perform sets of four or five songs. Completing songs in this mode unlocks the songs for play within the other game modes. Players can choose their on-stage character and their guitar; these elements have no effect on gameplay but affect the visuals during the performance. In Career Mode, players can earn money from their performances that is redeemable at the in-game store, where bonus content, such as additional songs, guitars and finishes, can be unlocked. Quick Play mode allows players to play any unlocked track, selecting the difficulty, the character, venue and guitar. After successfully completing a song in either Career or Quick Play mode, players are given a score and a rating from three to five stars, depending on their overall performance.

Multiplayer mode offers two players the chance to compete against each other on the same song. Two fret boards will appear on screen, one for each player, as they alternate playing sections of the song in a dueling manner. The player with the highest score at the end of the song wins.

The four difficulty levels for each song provide players with a learning curve in order to help them progress in skill. The first difficulty level, Easy, only focuses on the first three fret buttons while displaying a significantly reduced amount of notes for the player to play. Medium introduces a fourth fret button while adding more notes, and Hard includes the final fret button while adding additional notes. Expert does not introduce any other frets to learn, but adds more notes in a manner designed to challenge the player.

== Development ==
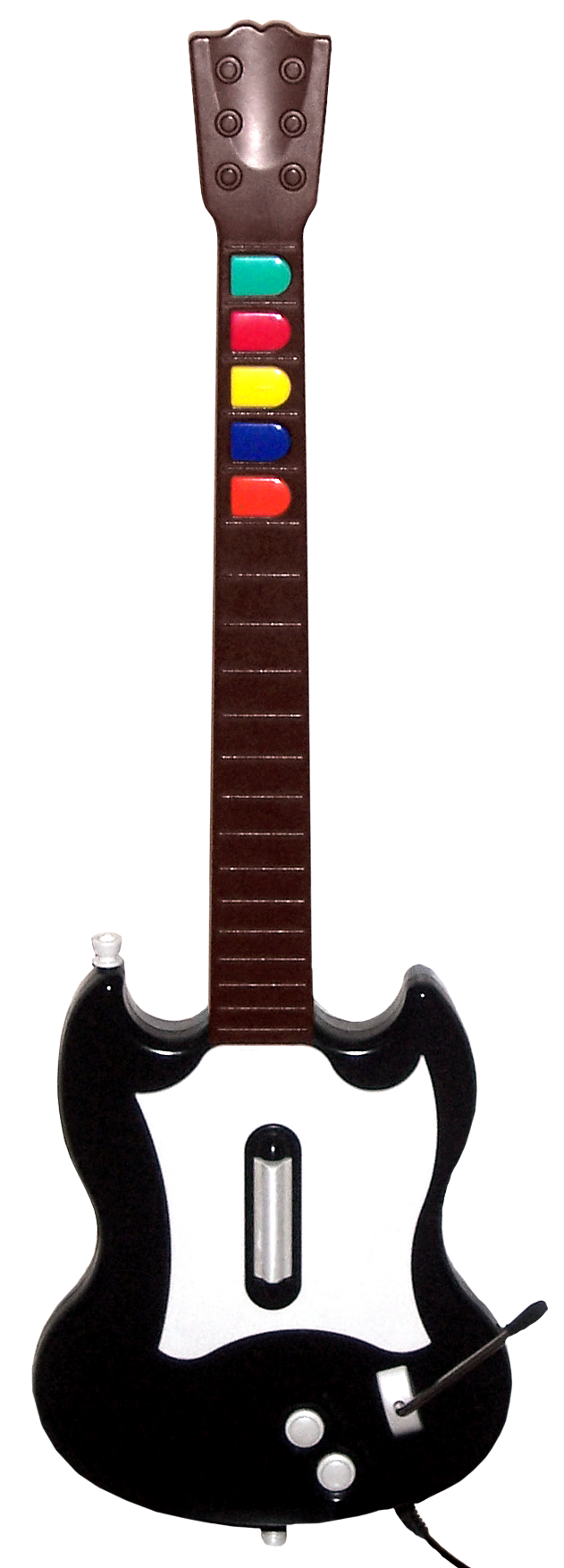
The controller that was packaged with the game, an approximately 3/4-scale reproduction of a Gibson SG

According to Rob Kay, the game's Lead Designer, the idea of Guitar Hero was directly inspired by Konami's Guitar Freaks arcade game, where the player used a guitar-shaped controller to interact with the game. At the time, GuitarFreaks had not seen much exposure in North America. RedOctane was making dance pads for games like Dance Dance Revolution for home consoles and also operated an online video rental service similar to Netflix. RedOctane's Kai and Charles Huang recognized the popularity of GuitarFreaks in Japan through their rental service, and planned to create guitar controllers to bring the game to North America. The Huangs raised $1.75 million for the effort, despite being turned down by some investors who "thought [the idea] was too weird". Greg Fischbach, one of the founders of Acclaim Entertainment, noted, regretfully several years later, they had passed on Guitar Hero, questioning "Who's going to buy a peripheral like that?" The Huangs approached Harmonix, who had previously made music video games such as Frequency, Amplitude and Karaoke Revolution about making a guitar-based video game for those controllers. With a budget of about one million dollars (which Kay noted was "pretty tiny for a video game"), the two companies worked together to develop Guitar Hero. Kay noted that "No one had any notions about it being a massive success; we all just thought it would be fun to do." Harmonix's president Alex Rigopulos also claims that former Microsoft vice-president of game publishing Ed Fries indirectly influenced the game's creation, who had previously told Harmonix when they were pitching Frequency to Microsoft that no music-rhythm game would succeed without custom hardware for it, prompting Rigopulos to investigate the Guitar Hero opportunity when it arose.

The team quickly recognized that "the controller really was the kind of magic sauce for what we wanted to do". They identified three aspects of gameplay that they felt made the game stand out. These aspects included the note-matching aspect and the showmanship created by the use of the whammy bar and tilting of the guitar within the game. The third key aspect was the use of Star Power "to provide a little more depth to the game — some replay value, some interest for people as they were playing beyond just hitting the notes". Harmonix used third party controllers made for GuitarFreaks that were already on the market for development of the game until RedOctane had prepared prototypes for the Guitar Hero controller. The controller initially had pressure-sensitive fret buttons to mimic the playing of a real guitar, but the idea was dropped as it made the gameplay too complex. The idea of using the whammy bar to boost Star Power, in addition to altering the pitch of sustained notes was only realized about a month before the completion of the game. The team had spent "precious development time and resources" into creating a free-style model that would have allowed players to improvise during songs but ultimately cut it as they could not work the feature into the existing gameplay.

"Gem tracks", the pattern of notes for a song, were developed by a team in Harmonix, taking usually a day to develop the tracks for one song. Tracks were designed to include key notes to "make [the player] feel as if [he is] a brilliant musician". Software algorithms were used to assess the difficulty of the tracks, and the quality assurance team helped to rebalance the tracks for accuracy and difficulty. The software also allowed Harmonix to quickly make changes to the set list or to recreate the tracks for a song to make sure the overall difficulty of the game was appropriate. Harmonix' past games Frequency and Amplitude aided in designing the visual interface for these gem tracks, such as how big to make the gems and how fast they should move on screen.

At the onset of development, the team did not have any idea of what songs would be present in the final game. Kay noted that "We wanted 30 or 40 songs for the game and put a hundred on our wish list." The game was to focus mostly on hard rock songs, but the team was limited by what could be licensed. The team also felt "morally obligated" to include older, classic rock songs like The Ramones' "I Wanna Be Sedated" to the younger target audience of the game. Harmonix had to modify the track list throughout development as certain songs were introduced or removed based on licensing issues, requiring the team to repeatedly balance difficulty and popularity of the track list. WaveGroup Sound were used to create the covers of the licensed songs provided in the game. Marcus Henderson of the band Drist provided many of the lead guitar tracks for the covers. WaveGroup Sound also went to efforts to try to recreate effects for some songs. In the case of Black Sabbath's "Iron Man", the team learned that the vocal effects were created by having Ozzy Osbourne sing from behind a metal fan. The team sought out the same model of fan through Craigslist to generate the same effect in the game's cover. Many of the bonus songs were from groups that Harmonix employees were part of or knew. Additionally, a "Be a Guitar Hero" contest was held allowing bands to submit their own song to be included in the game. The winning song was "Cheat on the Church" by Graveyard BBQ. Black Label Society's song, "Fire it Up", was included two weeks before the game was completed at the request of Zakk Wylde. The final song list was set very near to the shipping date.

Guitar Hero started with "super-basic Pong-style graphics" for the game display. The final game art was led by Ryan Lesser, using the art team's involvement in the music scene. Based on the experience from Frequency and Amplitude, the team realized that "people don't necessarily relate to really abstract visuals", and included the depictions of live performances as previously used in Karaoke Revolution. The PlayStation 2 was also limited so that they could not do photorealistic graphics. These limitations led to the exaggerated rock art style used in the game. House of Moves were used to assist in creation motion capture for the on-screen animations. The appearance of Star Power was made to resemble electricity, both to reflect the use of the electric guitar as well to conceptually demonstrate the excitement of the performance and the virtual audience. RedOctane signed on with MTV late into the game's production, and even MTV gave access to the game in its original programming.

Guitar Hero was initially released to retail stores in a bundle that packaged the game disc and a Gibson SG guitar controller, priced at $69.99. Since its release, stand-alone copies of the games and the guitar controller have been released, including both RedOctane and third-party controllers from TAC and Nyko. MadCatz, another controller company that has produced guitar controllers, was set to initially be part of the game's development, creating a version of the game for the Xbox, but had to pull out due to a lawsuit by Konami; MadCatz's Darrel Richardson stated they had to pay $300,000 to get out of their contract with RedOctane.

== Soundtrack ==
Guitar Hero features 47 playable songs, 30 of which are "main setlist" tracks that are covers of popular songs. Featured tracks include "Iron Man" by Black Sabbath, "Take Me Out" by Franz Ferdinand, "Spanish Castle Magic" by Jimi Hendrix, "Bark at the Moon" by Ozzy Osbourne, "Smoke on the Water" by Deep Purple, "Crossroads" by Cream, and "Fat Lip" by Sum 41. All cover tracks are credited on screen with the phrase "as made famous by" (e.g., "'I Wanna Be Sedated', as made famous by The Ramones"). The other 17 songs are master recordings selected from indie groups, most of which are formed by Harmonix employees.

== Reception ==
Reception

Aggregate scores
Aggregator	Score
GameRankings	91.96%
Metacritic	91/100

Review scores
Publication	Score
1Up.com	A+
Eurogamer	8/10
GameSpot	9.0/10
GameSpy	4.5/5
IGN	9.2/10
Play	10/10

Guitar Hero received critical acclaim upon release. It received a score of 91.96% on GameRankings and 91/100 on Metacritic. IGN praised the "fantastic soundtrack" and "great peripheral", further commenting that mini-Gibson SG controller "is what makes Guitar Hero, rather than what breaks it". GameSpot echoed these sentiments, stating Guitar Hero had a "great guitar controller" and "killer soundtrack" and was possibly the "best rhythm game ever made". Many reviews praised the game's gradual learning curve and difficulty approach through the song tier progression and the difficulty setting for each song. Play said the game "gives bedroom air guitarists a chance to live out their rock 'n' roll fantasies". GameSpy's review commented on the length of the songs, in that "once you hit the three minute mark or so, things start to feel 'too long'". Eurogamer said, "the lack of international star quality about the roster of songs and the absence of the original artists is perhaps the only thing that may detract from the package from an importer's perspective" and "it would have been truly amazing with a better track list".

Shortly after release, Guitar Hero became an unexpected hit; it was the second-highest-selling PlayStation 2 title in February 2006 according to the NPD Group. Game sales amounted to $45 million in 2005. Since then, the game has sold about 1.53 million copies through December 2007. The success of the game has spawned a one billion dollar Guitar Hero franchise, including four sequels on several seventh generation consoles, seven expansions, a mobile phone-based version, and a portable version for the Nintendo DS. Harmonix is no longer involved in development of the series, due to its acquisition by MTV. Harmonix has since developed Rock Band using designs similar to those that based Guitar Hero's success.

The game and its sequels have created interest in young adults and children in learning how to play a real guitar, and has been considered as a "cultural phenomenon" that has created a significant cultural impact. At the end of 2009, several journalists, including Wired, G4TV, CNN, the San Jose Mercury News, the Toronto Star, Inc., The Guardian, and Advertising Age, considered Guitar Hero to be one of the most influential products of the first decade of the 21st century, attributing it as the spark leading to the growth of the rhythm game market, for boosting music sales for both new and old artists, for introducing more social gaming concepts to the video game market, and, in conjunction with the Wii, for improving interactivity with gaming consoles.

=== Awards ===
Guitar Hero has won several awards. In IGN's "Best of 2005", the game was recognized for "Best Music Game", "Best PlayStation 2 Music Game", "Best Licensed Soundtrack", "Best Licensed Soundtrack for PlayStation 2", "Best Offline Multiplayer Game", "Best PlayStation 2 Offline Multiplayer Game", and "Best Gaming Peripheral" (for the Mini Gibson SG controller). GameSpot also recognized the game in its "Best and Worst of 2005", awarding it honors for "Best Puzzle/Rhythm Game", "Most Metal", and "Reader's Choice – Best Puzzle/Rhythm Game". The Game Developers Choice Awards honored Guitar Hero for "Excellence in Audio" and "Excellence in Game Innovation". During the 9th Annual Interactive Achievement Awards, the Academy of Interactive Arts & Sciences honored the game with awards for "Family Game of the Year", "Outstanding Innovation in Gaming", "Outstanding Achievement in Game Design", "Outstanding Achievement in Gameplay Engineering" (tied with Nintendogs), and "Outstanding Achievement in Soundtrack", along with receiving nominations for "Console Game of the Year", and "Overall Game of the Year". Guitar Hero also won "Best Soundtrack" at the 2005 Spike TV Video Game Awards.
