= Freezepop =

American synthpop band

- Origin: Boston, Massachusetts, U.S.
- Genres: Synth-pop; bitpop; electronic rock; electropop
- Years active: 1999–present
- Labels: The Archenemy Record Company, Elefant, Cordless, Rykodisc
- Members: Liz Enthusiasm; The Other Sean T. Drinkwater; Robert John "Bananas" Foster; Christmas Disco-Marie Sagan
- Past members: Kasson Crooker
- Website: www.freezepop.net

Freezepop is an American electronic band from Boston, Massachusetts, United States, formed in 1999 by Liz Enthusiasm, Sean T. Drinkwater, and The Duke of Pannekoeken (an alias for Kasson Crooker). Since December 2009, the current lineup includes Enthusiasm, Drinkwater, Robert John "Bananas" Foster, and Christmas Disco-Marie Sagan. The band is named after the frozen snack, and they have described their music as "sweet and cold and fruity and plastic-y".

Several of the band's songs have appeared in video games, including the Harmonix titles Frequency, Amplitude, Karaoke Revolution, Phase, the Guitar Hero series, the Rock Band series, and Neon FM. Their music has also been included in Downhill Domination, Dance Dance Revolution Ultramix 3, and StepManiaX. Freezepop songs continue to appear in certain Harmonix titles. Former member Kasson Crooker currently works as a senior producer at Harmonix.

The group is popular with college students in Boston and has become part of the US synthpop scene.

== Early life ==
Christmas Disco-Marie Sagan (Ashley Holtgraver) once wrote a letter to Mystery Science Theater 3000 that was read out-loud in the episode Fire Maidens from Outer Space. She later appeared with Joel Hodgson in the series' Turkey Day 2015.

== Background ==
Originally, their music was entirely composed on a small portable MIDI sequencer, a Yamaha QY70, which has often been mistaken for a Game Boy. On more recent albums, they have expanded their toolkit due to a lack of variety in the sounds the QY70 provided, but it still remains an important part of the composing process. The release of Future Future Future Perfect only features the QY70 in a single song, that being "Pop Music Is Not a Crime".

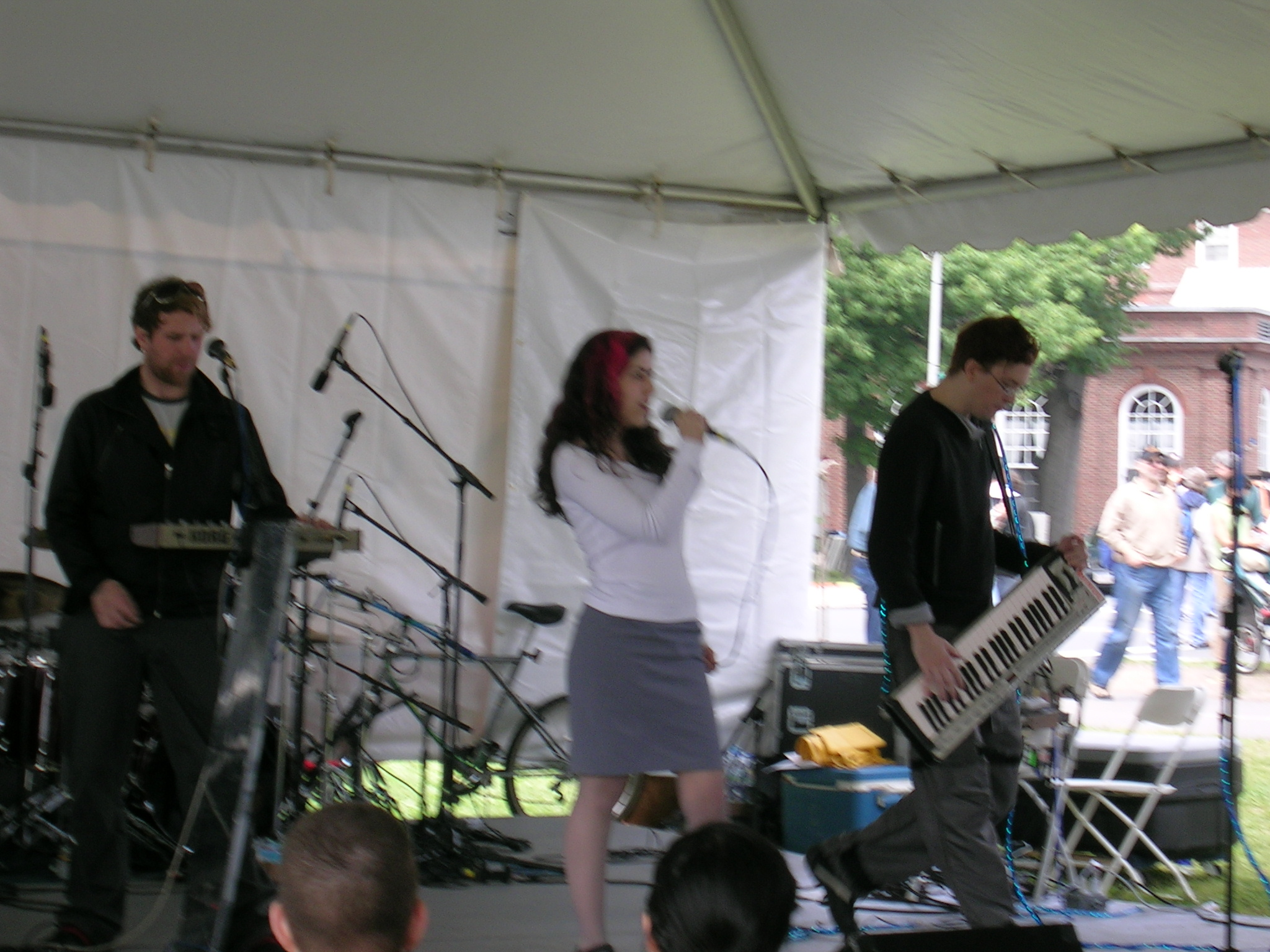
Freezepop performing at the Cambridge River Festival on June 18, 2005

In addition to Freezepop, Kasson, who had previously been in fellow Boston band Splashdown, still records as a solo artist Symbion Project. Drinkwater is also a member of the bands Lifestyle and Karacter, and worked with the band Polystar on their debut album. Enthusiasm appears on the song "Boom Box Chic" by Los Angeles-based LeMans Electro.

In addition to dozens of remixes released over the years, Freezepop released a remix of their song "Shark Attack" done by chiptune band 8 Bit Weapon in October 2007. The remix was done with a Nintendo Entertainment System and a Commodore 64 computer. A recurring theme in Freezepop's music is references to science, technology, and mathematics. As examples, the "hi-phive" mix of "Science Genius Girl" features Enthusiasm reciting the first thirty digits of Phi. Additionally, the "Robotron 2002" "All Your Base Are Belong to Us" remix by DJ Nebula pays homage to the Internet meme All your base are belong to us.

Freezepop was arrested in Canada in November 2006 for trying to enter the country under false pretenses. Harmonix pokes fun at them for this in the loading screens for their songs, in Rock Band and Rock Band 2.

On June 4, 2009, it was announced on Freezepop's official website that founding member the Duke of Pannekoeken (originally the Duke of Candied Apples, as well as the Duke of Belgian Waffles, all three pseudonyms of Crooker) would be leaving the band. Crooker stated, "My responsibilities at Harmonix making games continue to increase which takes away from my time and energy to compose and go out on the road to play shows." He also added that he had plans to focus on his side endeavor Symbion Project while also doing Freezepop remixes in the future. His last show as a member of the band was at the Penny Arcade Expo 2009 in Seattle on September 5.

On November 25, 2009, the band announced the addition of two new members: Robert John "Bananas" Foster and Christmas Disco-Marie Sagan.

On April 25, 2016, the band launched a Kickstarter crowdfunding campaign to raise money for a fifth studio album to follow Imaginary Friends (2010). They posted a video, along with a photo of a royalty check of $2.93 that they received for online music streaming services. The band's initial goal was US $30,000, which was reached in less than 24 hours. Their next goal of $40,000 was reached, which allowed the band to also release the album on vinyl. More stretch goals have been set for additional content, such as collaborations and a remix album. The album, titled Fantasizer, was released on October 6, 2020.

=== Soundtrack appearances ===
Along with bands such as The Aquabats, Bad Credit, and Slowdraw the Hungry Eskimo, their music is featured in the comedy series Mega64, which also produced the music video for Freezepop's song "Brainpower".

Freezepop's song "Swimming Pool" was featured in the episode "Liquid Heat" in the fifth season of The L Word, originally aired March 2, 2008. "Frontload" was featured in the final episode of the fourth season of MTV's The Hills, which originally aired on December 22, 2008. In 2010. their song "Less Talk, More Rokk" was featured in The Fourth Panel, a web TV series from the webcomic Penny Arcade.

== Critical reception ==
Freezepop won Best New Band at the 2002 American Synthpop Awards and were semifinalists on WBCN's Rumble competition. In early 2006, Freezepop's "Stakeout" won in the Dance/Electronica – Song category at The 5th Annual Independent Music Awards.

== Band members ==
=== Current ===
- Liz Enthusiasm – vocals (1999–present)
- The Other Sean T. Drinkwater – synthesizers (1999–present), programming (2009–present)
- Robert John "Bananas" Foster – keytar (2009–present), live "drums" (2009–present)
- Christmas Disco-Marie Sagan – synthesizers (2009–present), vocoder (2009–present)

=== Past ===
- Kasson Crooker (as The Duke of Pannekoeken, The Duke Of Pancakes, and The Duke Of Candied Apples) – programming (1999–2009)

== Discography ==
=== Studio albums ===
- Freezepop Forever (2000)
- Fancy Ultra•Fresh (2004)
- Future Future Future Perfect (2007)
- Imaginary Friends (2010)
- Fantasizer (2020)
- Fog (2023)
- February Fourteen (2025)
- Fog Twenty•Five (2025)

=== EPs, remix albums, and compilations ===
- The Orange EP (EP, 2000, limited edition CD-R)
- The Purple EP (EP, 2000, limited edition CD-R)
- Fashion Impression Function (EP, 2001)
- Hi-Five My Remix (remix, 2003)
- Mini Ultra•Fresh (remix, 2004, promo only)
- Maxi Ultra•Fresh (remix, 2005, out-of-print)
- Less Talk More Rokk (remix EP, 2007, digital-only release)
- Form Activity Motion (remix EP, 2008, online)
- The Sexy Sounds Of Freezepop (EP, 2008)
- Doppelgänger EP (EP, 2012, online)
- Ultra•Spectacular Bonanza (compilation, 2014, USB Drive)
- The Covers EP (EP, 2015, online)
- Phantoms (EP, 2015, online)
- Santasizer (EP, 2020, online)

=== Singles ===
- "Bike Thief" (2003, 12")
- "Dancy Ultra•Fresh" (2005, 12")
- "The Rokk Suite" (2006, CD single)
- Anchor to the World Below (2020, Maxi-Single)
- The Ghost Rejoins the Living (2021, Maxi-Single)
- Rare Bird (2022, Maxi-Single)
- Babes (2022, Maxi-Single)
- Step into the Sunshine! (2022, Maxi-Single)

=== Remixes by Freezepop ===
- "Seven Boom Medley" (Multi-cover) (2004) – "Boom Boom" by Paul Lekakis and "Boom, Boom, Boom, Boom!!" by The Vengaboys
- "Unicorn" (Killin' Remix) (2004) – by Apoptygma Berzerk
- "Unicorn" (Killin' Club Remix) (2004) – by Apoptygma Berzerk

=== Remixes of Freezepop ===
- "Duct Tape My Heart" (Remix) (Hyperbubble, 2005)
- "Science Genius Girl" (Robotkid's Lameboy Remix) (Robotkid, 2007)
- "Thought Balloon" (Ming & Ping Rethink) (Ming and Ping, 2008)
- "Tender Lies" (DECTalk Remix) (Druaga1, 2010)
