= Archenemy Record Company =

American record label

- Founded: 1997
- Genre: Indie, synthpop
- Country of origin: U.S.
- Location: Boston, Massachusetts
- Official website: www.archenemy.com

The Archenemy Record Company is a record label founded in 1997 and located in Boston, Massachusetts. It is home to such acts as Freezepop, Lifestyle, The Texas Governor, Neptune Rockets Burst from the Streetlamps, Chop Chop, and Karacter. The label is perhaps best known for Freezepop, which has gained a nationwide following after having music appearing in several video games, including Guitar Hero and FreQuency.
