= Justinne Gamache =

American synthpop musician and graphic designer

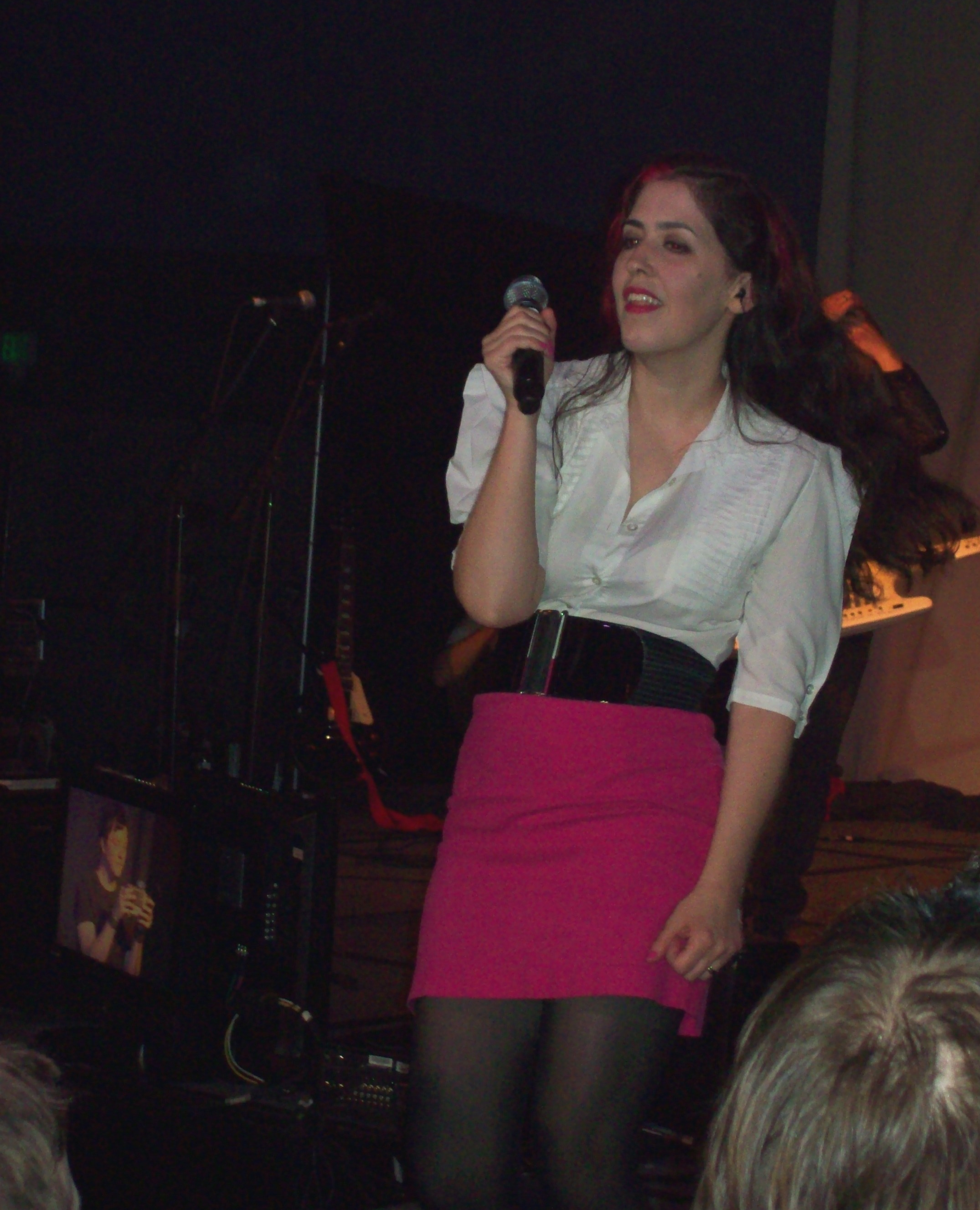
Gamache performs at the Penny Arcade Expo in September 2009 in Seattle

Justinne "Jussi" Gamache, also known by her pseudonym Liz Enthusiasm, is the lead singer of indie synthpop band Freezepop. She lives in Massachusetts.

Gamache also works in graphic design, and has done design work on Freezepop's website, albums, and their 2016 Kickstarter campaign. She has created several music videos for Freezepop using then-Macromedia's Flash program.

Gamache writes the majority of her lyrics in English, but has also written songs in Japanese ("Tenisu no Boifurendo"), and French ("Parlez-Vous Freezepop?").

In 2004, Gamache and her best friend and fellow musician, Gordon Merrick, released an internet album titled Best Friends Forever containing six covers, one of a Freezepop song. Gamache and Merrick continued their collaboration on their 2006 Manchester on My Mind EP, which includes covers of such Manchester bands as Inspiral Carpets and The Stone Roses.

Gamache holds two degrees from Boston University School for the Arts.
