= Harmonix =

American video game developer

Harmonix Music Systems, Inc.
- Trade name: Harmonix
- Type: Subsidiary
- Industry: Video games
- Founded: May 10, 1995; 31 years ago
- Founders: Alex Rigopulos; Eran Egozy
- Headquarters: Boston, Massachusetts, US
- Key people: Alex Rigopulos (chairman); Steve Janiak (CEO); Chris Rigopulos (COO)
- Products: Guitar Hero series; Rock Band series; Dance Central series; Karaoke Revolution series; Fantasia: Music Evolved; Fuser; Fortnite Festival
- Number of employees: 100+ (2020)
- Parent: MTV Games (2006–2010); Microsoft Studios (minority stake, 2010–2015); Epic Games (2021–present)
- Website: harmonixmusic.com

Harmonix Music Systems, Inc., doing business as Harmonix, is an American video game developer company based in Boston, Massachusetts. The company was established in May 1995 by Alex Rigopulos and Eran Egozy. Harmonix is perhaps best known as being the developer of music video games series Dance Central and Rock Band, as well as being the original developer and creator of the Guitar Hero series before development moved to Neversoft and Vicarious Visions.

== History ==
=== Formation ===
Harmonix was founded on May 10, 1995, by Alex Rigopulos and Eran Egozy, who met while attending MIT. Egozy was an electrical/computer engineer with an interest in music, while Rigopulos was a music composition major with an interest in programming; both met while working in the MIT Media Lab. After building a computer music generation system that could algorithmically create music on the fly, the two considered how one could use a joystick to control the system, and set up a demonstration of the unit for the Lab, which gained interest from others in the Lab. The two realized that after graduation that they probably couldn't pursue such ideas working at any existing companies, so they chose to start their own. The company was built on the premise that the experience of performing music could become accessible to those who would otherwise have trouble learning a traditional instrument.

The company was initially funded with about US$100,000, and for the first five years had nearly zero revenue. The company's earliest product was The Axe on PC CD-ROM. The Axe enabled consumers to easily perform unique instrumental solos by using a PC joystick. This product only sold about 300 copies, with Rigopulos and Egozy realizing that people, while initially entranced by the game, lost interest after 15 minutes of playing with it. Harmonix then designed "CamJam", which performed similar functions, this time using simple body gestures to trigger music sequences. CamJam was utilized at Disney theme parks. This led the two to consider approaching entertainment businesses like Dave & Buster's to include its products, but they soon realized that this would be a year to a year-and-a-half effort, too long for their needs. They then considered the entertainment industry in Japan, which in 1997, was taking off with the introduction of karaoke bars and music video games such as PaRappa the Rapper, Beatmania, and Dance Dance Revolution. They attempted to sell their CamJam equipment to these entertainment centers but found little interest for it. They came to a realization that games like karaoke were popular not due to personal expression, but because they encouraged players to try to accurately recreate the songs through their actions. These games also focused on bringing musical experiences to gamers through simple, understandable interfaces commonly found in games. With this realization, the two returned to the United States and regrouped their company as a video game developer, though they had to let about 40% of their current staff go.

=== Early titles ===
Harmonix' first major video game was Frequency, with its development funded by Sony Computer Entertainment along with about $2 million in investments in the company. A key factor of Harmonix' contract with Sony was that it was allowed to keep its intellectual property, which allowed Harmonix to build on the game for its future endeavours. The game's development began in 1999, backed by a larger team at Harmonix, many of whom were musicians. Featuring songs by a number of underground electronica artists, FreQuency allowed players to perform and remix a variety of music. The game was backed by Sony Computer Entertainment Vice President of Product Development, Shuhei Yoshida. Released in 2001 on the PlayStation 2, FreQuency was critically acclaimed and won numerous awards, though it failed to become a mainstream success. Harmonix developed a sequel, Amplitude, released in 2003. Several changes were made to its predecessor to broaden the game's appeal, from gameplay tweaks to a more mainstream soundtrack. And again, Amplitude achieved awards, critical praise, and a small cult following, but it was not a financial hit. The two attributed the poor response to the games due in part to the lack of a mainstream soundtrack and that the gameplay was difficult to connect to if one was not playing the game.

After Amplitude, Harmonix was approached by Konami to create the Karaoke Revolution franchise. Konami, known for their Bemani line of music games, wanted to distribute their games in the United States, and Harmonix was the only music game developer in the country at the time. Konami was responsible for publishing the Karaoke Revolution titles, of which Harmonix developed and released three "volumes" between 2003 and 2004. The series was much more successful due to its mainstream music and its marketability.

Also in 2004, Sony Computer Entertainment released the Harmonix project EyeToy: AntiGrav. A departure from music games, the title used the PlayStation 2 EyeToy camera peripheral to enable one's body to perform as a controller for a futuristic extreme sports game. However, the game was poorly received by critics, despite selling four times as many copies as FreQuency or Amplitude.

At this time, RedOctane, a peripheral manufacturing company that had enjoyed Harmonix' previous games, approached Harmonix about developing the software for a game that would be based on a guitar-shaped controller, inspired by GuitarFreaks which was popular in Japan. This relationship led to the creation of Guitar Hero, published by RedOctane in 2005. The game features similar gameplay elements to FreQuency and Amplitude. Guitar Hero uses a guitar-shaped controller designed uniquely for the game. Specifically, the Guitar Hero controller was designed with five color-coded "fret" buttons and a "strum bar". Guitar Hero became largely successful, both critically and commercially, resulting in the well-received 2006 sequel Guitar Hero II, also developed by Harmonix.

=== Purchase by Viacom ===
In the early part of 2006, Activision acquired RedOctane, and several publishers became interested in acquiring Harmonix. In September 2006, MTV Networks, a division of media conglomerate Viacom, announced that it was acquiring Harmonix for $175 million. Harmonix's last Guitar Hero game for RedOctane, Guitar Hero Encore: Rocks the 80s, was released in July 2007, thus fulfilling its contractual obligations with the publisher. Before it left the series, Harmonix had already envisioned expanding the gameplay of Guitar Hero to multiple instruments, a concept that eventually led to Rock Band that would develop under MTV. Shortly after the acquisition by MTV in December 2006, the initial discussion between Dhani Harrison, son of George Harrison, and MTV President Van Toffler occurred that eventually led to meetings between Harmonix and Apple Corps, Ltd., leading to the creation of The Beatles: Rock Band, though this was not publicly revealed until late 2008.

Harmonix released Rock Band in November 2007. As Harmonix's first game as a part of MTV, Rock Band expanded upon the design of Guitar Hero by incorporating three different peripherals: guitar/bass, microphone, and drums. Harmonix continued to support the game after its initial release by offering a variety of downloadable songs to PlayStation 3 and Xbox 360 players on a weekly basis. As of March 2013 over 4,000 songs have been made available as downloadable content, with over 100 million songs downloaded.

In October 2008, Harmonix, along with MTV Games, announced an exclusive agreement with Apple Corps, Ltd. to produce a standalone title based on the Rock Band premise and featuring the music of The Beatles, to be released late in 2009. The Beatles: Rock Band features a visual and musical history of the Beatles, and includes 45 songs from their 1962-69 tenure with EMI, using United Kingdom-released versions of their albums Please Please Me through Abbey Road. The developers have worked with Paul McCartney and Ringo Starr to gain input on the game, and were using Giles Martin, son of Sir George Martin who produced most of the Beatles albums, as music director for the game. Harmonix stated, despite building on the Rock Band gameplay, this would not be a Rock Band branded title, and that the songs would not be available as downloadable content for the Rock Band series. The agreement had been in discussion for more than 17 months before the announcement.

In November 2008, Viacom paid Harmonix a $150 million bonus as part of the terms of the company's 2006 acquisition. The previous quarter's bonus was $150 million. In a 2009 survey of the best places to work in the Boston area, the Boston Globe ranked Harmonix as the 3rd best workplace overall, and the top mid-size business in its poll.

On 10 December 2009, Harmonix laid off 39 of its employees, primarily in the QA department.

=== Sale by Viacom ===
On November 11, 2010, Viacom stated that it was in talks with potential buyers for Harmonix, having already marked the unit as a discontinued operation to write off a $299 million loss for its 2010 third-quarter earnings statement. Such talks had been in place since September 2010, before the release of either Rock Band 3 or Dance Central. Viacom president and CEO, Philippe Dauman, stated the reason it was selling the company was to refocus Viacom as an entertainment creator, and that "the console games business requires expertise [Viacom doesn't] have". Viacom also recognized that without dedicated resources to support video game development, the company was not able to take advantage of efficiencies the dedicated video game publishers have. Martin Peers of the Wall Street Journal noted that Viacom lacked the physical distribution channels that other entertainment companies like Time Warner have, and instead were forced to rely on Electronic Arts to distribute the game and cut into its potential profits. Electronic Arts CEO John Riccitiello, commenting on the potential purchase of Harmonix by his company, called Harmonix a "falling knife" in regards to the diminishing size of the rhythm game market since 2009, and stated that "more people have been cut trying to catch falling knives than have benefited from getting the timing exactly right". John Drake of Harmonix affirmed that Viacom would continue to support Harmonix until the sale is complete, and the developer would still continue its normal operations for its games which is unaffected by the sale.

In late December 2010, Viacom announced that it had sold Harmonix to Harmonix-SBE Holdings LLC, a holding company for the family office of investor Jason Epstein. The terms of the sale were undisclosed, though estimated at $200 million. This sale returned Harmonix to its origins as an independent developer. The resulting sale did not affect present or future support plans for Harmonix' games; Harmonix retained the intellectual property rights for Rock Band and Dance Central in the sale, allowing Harmonix Music Systems to continue to develop these series. According to Peter Kafka of the Wall Street Journal, the sale of Harmonix was heavily discounted, possibly as low as fifty dollars, the equivalent of a fire sale and allowing Viacom to claim certain tax benefits; meanwhile, the new independent owners would assume all ongoing liability for Harmonix' projects, including music licensing fees and unsold inventory. Viacom later affirmed that it received nearly $115 million in tax benefits from the Harmonix sale. Following the purchase, Harmonix underwent a restructuring in February 2011, laying off about 12-15% of the 240-person staff. Shortly after this, Activision announced it was shuttering its Guitar Hero division and cancelling planned games for 2011, which many journalists considered to mark the end of the rhythm game genre; Harmonix's Director of Communications, John Drake, in response to this closure, called the news "discouraging", but affirmed that Harmonix would continue to invest itself in further Rock Band and Dance Central developments for the foreseeable future.

While Viacom sought a buyer for Harmonix, shareholders of Harmonix, including founders Rigopulos and Egozy, filed a lawsuit against Viacom, alleging misconduct in providing performance payouts in line with the terms of the purchase of Harmonix by Viacom. Harmonix' suit contests that while Viacom had paid Harmonix $150 million for success of the Rock Band series in 2007, the shareholders are due a substantially larger sum for continued success in 2008, as determined by their proxy, Walter Winshall. Viacom countered the claims, stating that Winshall rejected various offers made by Viacom for the payout. The lawsuit also contends that Viacom has withheld $13 million in payouts from 2007, which Viacom had claimed at the time were to cover potential losses in patent lawsuits that were initiated against Harmonix by Activision and Gibson which have since been settled out of court. Viacom has stated it would "vigorously" defend itself in this lawsuit, and initiated a counter-suit in September 2011, suing Harmonix for $131 million believing the $150 million payout was overcalculated. In late 2011, BDO USA, the contract-assigned arbitrator on the matter, concluded that Viacom owed $383 million to Harmonix in addition to the money already paid out, a total of $708 million when combined with the initial purchase by Viacom and initial $150 million advance payment in 2007. Viacom disputed this figure, claiming that BDO's report excluded specific evidence supplied by Viacom.

Of the $383 million owed to Harmonix, Viacom agreed to pay $84 million in part to settle the 2007 payments, leaving the dispute for the 2008 payments in court. In August 2012, the Delaware Court of Chancery dismissed Viacom's claims, and ordered the company to pay Harmonix the remaining $299 million, though Viacom stated that it was seeking what further options it had. Viacom appealed the decision, but the previous judgement was upheld by the Delaware Supreme Court in July 2013.

=== As an independent developer ===
Approximately 6 to 9 months after its sale from Viacom, Harmonix started to grow again, boosted by sales of Dance Central which led to the development of its sequel Dance Central 2 in late 2011. By mid-2011, the company began developing new IP in both the mobile and social game markets, and began rehiring to aid in the development of these games. Continued support of the Rock Band franchise has remained a "meaningful source of profitability" to Harmonix through 2011, according to Rigopulos. Bloomberg then projected that Harmonix would post $100 million in profit in 2011, based on sales of Dance Central and continued downloadable content for the game.

At the onset of the 2013 E3 conference, Harmonix announced that its next title would be the Kinect-enabled Fantasia: Music Evolved produced in association with Disney Interactive. The game is based around the animated film Fantasia, and puts the player in control of music in a manner similar to Harmonix' previous rhythm games, affecting the virtual environment and interactive objects within it. The game is based on licensed contemporary rock music such as Queen and Bruno Mars.

In February 2014, Harmonix announced a new title, Chroma, co-developed with Hidden Path Entertainment, which combines their music genre experience with first-person shooters. The players' actions are timed to the music in the game, influencing their effect with certain actions like gunfire, grenade explosions, and team healing. Chroma was planned for release in late 2014 on Microsoft Windows systems via Steam.

In May 2014, along with about 37 layoffs, Alex Rigopulos stepped aside from CEO to become the company's chief creative officer, while Steve Janiak would take over as CEO.

In March 2015, Harmonix announced its plan to return to Rock Band with the next major title in the series, Rock Band 4. The new title, aimed to support backwards compatibility with all previous songs and instrument hardware, was aimed to be more of a platform for the eighth-generation consoles, the PlayStation 4 and Xbox One, as it has no plans to release another standalone title during this console generation but would continually provide free and paid features and content updates throughout its lifetime. Harmonix had $15 million in investor funding from Spark Capital and Foundry Group to support Rock Band 4, Amplitude and additional projects going forward including virtual reality-based games.

In September 2015, Rigopulos announced that he would go to the advisory board for the crowdfunding site Fig, through which Harmonix would obtain funding for its next, yet-announced game. On 1 March 2016, Harmonix confirmed that the campaign was indeed to raise funds to port Rock Band 4 to the PC, but gamers would only have until 5 April to pledge US$1.5 million to make it happen. The campaign was unsuccessful raising a total of $792,817.

On 20 March 2017, Harmonix released Rock Band VR, a virtual reality based Rock Band game, onto Oculus Rift, with Oculus Studio assuming the publishing role.

Harmonix and NCSoft announced a publishing deal in August 2018 for an unspecified title developed by Harmonix and published by NCSoft across personal computers and console systems. This was revealed in February 2020 as Fuser, a DJ-inspired title to be released for Microsoft Windows, PlayStation 4, Xbox One and Nintendo Switch in late 2020. Players, as a DJ, interactively mix tracks of popular licensed songs alongside specific rules as they appear on screen.

=== Purchase by Epic Games ===
Harmonix was acquired by Epic Games (which is currently co-owned by The Walt Disney Company) in November 2021. Harmonix stated that this would not affect its support for Rock Band 4 or Fuser DLC, though Fuser was discontinued in 2022. The company also stated it would develop "musical journeys and gameplay for Fortnite" in addition to making musical projects in the metaverse. This ultimately culminated in the release of Fortnite Festival on December 9, 2023. Fortnite Festival follows a similar approach to Rock Band, allowing players to match notes to popular songs, while also offering a "jam" mode that allows players to mix parts from different songs, as in Dropmix or Fuser. According to Rigopulos, the company plans to treat Fortnite Festival as a live-service musical experience for Fortnite. He also confirmed plans for instrument controller support, describing it as "very much a priority" for the team. On January 17, 2024, Harmonix announced that it would discontinue Rock Band 4 DLC, with the final DLC songs released on January 25, 2024.

== Games developed ==
Year	Title	Platforms
2001	Frequency	PlayStation 2
2003	Amplitude	PlayStation 2
2003	Karaoke Revolution	PlayStation 2, Xbox
2004	Karaoke Revolution Vol. 2	PlayStation 2
2004	Karaoke Revolution Vol. 3	PlayStation 2
2004	EyeToy: AntiGrav	PlayStation 2
2005	Karaoke Revolution Party	GameCube, PlayStation 2, Xbox
2005	Guitar Hero	PlayStation 2
2006	CMT Presents: Karaoke Revolution Country	PlayStation 2
2006	Guitar Hero II	Xbox 360, PlayStation 2
2007	Guitar Hero Encore: Rocks the 80s	PlayStation 2
2007	Phase	iPod
2007	Rock Band	Xbox 360, PlayStation 2, PlayStation 3, Wii
2008	Rock Band 2	Xbox 360, PlayStation 2, PlayStation 3, Wii
2009	Rock Band Unplugged	PlayStation Portable
2009	The Beatles: Rock Band	Xbox 360, PlayStation 3, Wii
2009	Lego Rock Band	Xbox 360, PlayStation 3, Wii, Nintendo DS
2009	Rock Band Mobile	iOS
2010	Green Day: Rock Band	Xbox 360, PlayStation 3, Wii
2010	Rock Band 3	Xbox 360, PlayStation 3, Wii, DS
2010	Dance Central	Xbox 360
2011	Dance Central 2	Xbox 360
2011	VidRhythm	iOS
2012	Rock Band Blitz	Xbox 360, PlayStation 3
2012	Dance Central 3	Xbox 360
2014	Record Run	iOS, Android
2014	Dance Central Spotlight	Xbox One
2014	A City Sleeps	Windows
2014	Fantasia: Music Evolved	Xbox 360, Xbox One
2014	Chroma	Windows
2015	Rock Band 4	Xbox One, PlayStation 4
2015	Beat Sports	Apple TV
2015	BeatNiks	iOS, Android
2016	Amplitude	PlayStation 3, PlayStation 4
2016	Rock Band Rivals	Xbox One, PlayStation 4
2016	Harmonix Music VR	PlayStation 4
2017	Rock Band VR	Oculus Rift
2017	SingSpace	Gear VR, Oculus Rift
2017	DropMix	iOS, Android
2017	Super Beat Sports	Nintendo Switch
2019	Audica	Oculus Rift, Vive, Oculus Quest, PlayStation 4
2019	Twitch Sings	Windows, macOS
2019	Dance Central	Oculus Rift, Oculus Rift S, Oculus Quest
2020	Fuser	Nintendo Switch, PlayStation 4, Windows, Xbox One
2023	Fortnite Festival	Android, Nintendo Switch, Nintendo Switch 2, PlayStation 4, PlayStation 5, Windows, Xbox One, Xbox Series X/S
