= Amplitude (2003 video game) =

Rhythm video game

- Developer: Harmonix
- Publisher: Sony Computer Entertainment
- Director: Greg LoPiccolo
- Producers: Tracy Rosenthal-Newsom; Daniel Sussman
- Programmers: Eran Egozy; Eric Malafeew
- Platform: PlayStation 2
- Release: NA: March 25, 2003; EU: September 26, 2003
- Genre: Rhythm
- Modes: Single-player, multiplayer

Amplitude is a 2003 rhythm video game developed by Harmonix and published by Sony Computer Entertainment for the PlayStation 2. It is the sequel to Frequency (2001).

In Amplitude the player controls a beat blaster ship across a lane of six tracks, each track representing a musical instrument and containing note gems that the player shoots at in time with the music. The player earns points for accurate playing and increases their scoring multiplier by playing a series of flawless sequences; the player loses energy by missing too many notes and can end the song prematurely if they run out of energy. Compared to the original Frequency which used more electronica and trance music, Amplitude included additional pop rock songs in its soundtrack.

The game was met with a critical applause and a decent financial success, elevating Harmonix into a major studio in the development of music games. In 2014, Harmonix successfully offered a Kickstarter campaign to raise over $840,000 in funds to build a new Amplitude game for PlayStation 3 and 4 consoles; the reboot was released in January 2016 under license from Sony.

== Gameplay ==
In Amplitude, the player controls a ship (referred to as a "Beat Blaster") moving down a path of varying shapes and lengths, containing up to six tracks. Each color-coded track corresponds to a different aspect of the song, such as percussion, synth, bass, or vocals, and contains a sequence of notes. As the player hits buttons corresponding to the note placement on the track, the notes activate a small portion of the track. If the player successfully activates enough notes in sequence, the track is "captured" and the section will play automatically for a number of bars, freeing the player to capture another section.

The object of the game is to capture a sufficient number of sections to reach the end of the song. If the player continually misses notes, an energy meter empties until the game is over.

There are several different powerups available to the player to make gameplay easier. Powerups are gained by activating a series of specially shaped and colored notes. Such powerups allow immediate capturing of tracks, doubling of points scored, slowing down the speed of play, and jumping into freestyle mode (which allows the player to riff to the music, gaining points without the difficulty of playing predefined tracks).

=== Modes ===
Amplitude offers four different modes of play: single player game, remix, multiplayer and online.

In single player, the object is to unlock and complete all of the songs. There are four levels of gameplay difficulty: Mellow, Normal, Brutal, and Insane. Certain songs are only available to play on harder difficulty settings. Often the player is rewarded with pieces to construct and customize their "FreQ" avatar.

The remix mode in Amplitude is much like the one in Frequency. The player may place notes to every section of the song (except the vocal section) in whatever patterns they so choose, creating a unique version of the song. The effects (chorus, delay, etc.) and tempo of the song are also controllable. Finished remixes are available for gameplay in both single player and multiplayer modes.

Multiplayer mode offers three distinct modes: a typical gameplay mode, a head-to-head mode and a remix mode. The main multiplayer mode offers up to four players simultaneous gameplay through any of the unlocked songs. The head-to-head mode features Simon says-esque gameplay between two players, in which the players alternate creating riffs and then attempting to play them back. The remix mode is identical to the single player remix mode, but with the participation of more players.

Online mode offered multiplayer play with an internet connection. Sony of America shutdown the online Amplitude servers on February 26, 2007, with the online servers in the European version of the game continuing to function until late 2011.

== Songs ==
There are 26 songs in Amplitude, the majority of which are tracks by popular music artists, with genres ranging from electronica and dance to hip hop and alternative rock. Some of the tracks, however, were produced "in-house" specifically for Amplitude. Kasson Crooker, who served as the musical director for the game, contributed the songs "Cool Baby", "Synthesized", "Robot Rockerz" and "Spaztik", as well as "Super Sprøde" as performed by his band Freezepop.

The following is a list of artists who contributed songs to the game, with a corresponding song title, in order of gameplay. The fourth song in each section is a "boss" song while the fifth is an unlockable bonus song. "Spaztik" is unlockable only in the Insane difficulty.

Song title	Artist	Original composition for game?	Tier
"Boom (The Crystal Method Mix)"	P.O.D. vs. T.C.M.	No	1. Neotropolis
"Cherry Lips"	Garbage	No	1. Neotropolis
"Baseline"	Quarashi	No	1. Neotropolis
"Shades of Blue"	Chris Child featuring Melissa Kaplan	Yes	1. Neotropolis
"Uptown Saturday Night"	Logan 7	No	1. Neotropolis
"King of Rock (X-Ecutioners Remix)"	Run-DMC	Yes	2. Beat Factory
"Urban Tumbleweed"	The Baldwin Brothers	No	2. Beat Factory
"Dope Nose"	Weezer	No	2. Beat Factory
"Everyone Says 'Hi' (Metro Remix)"	David Bowie	Yes	2. Beat Factory
"Super-Sprøde"	Freezepop	Yes	2. Beat Factory
"Respect"	Pink	No	3. Metaclouds
"M-80 (Explosive Energy Movement)"	Papa Roach	No	3. Metaclouds
"What's Going On"	Mekon with Roxanne Shante	No	3. Metaclouds
"Rockit (2.002 Remix)"	Herbie Hancock with Mixmaster Mike, Grand Mixer DXT, Rob Swift, Q*Bert, Babu, Faust, Shortee	No	3. Metaclouds
"Rockstar"	The Production Club	Yes	3. Metaclouds
"Cool Baby"	DJ HMX with Plural	Yes	4. Elektro Kore
"Kimosabe"	BT with Wildchild	No	4. Elektro Kore
"Nitro Narcosis" (Mislabeled in error, the correct name is "Hard Wax")	Manchild	No	4. Elektro Kore
"I Am Hated"	Slipknot	No	4. Elektro Kore
"Push"	Game Boyz	Yes	4. Elektro Kore
"The Rock Show"	Blink-182	No	5. Blastlands
"Sub Culture (Dieselboy + Kaos Rock Remix)"	Styles of Beyond	No	5. Blastlands
"Out the Box"	Akrobatik vs. Symbion Project	Yes	5. Blastlands
"Synthesized"	Symbion Project	Yes	5. Blastlands
"Robot Rockerz"	Komputer Kontroller	Yes	5. Blastlands
"Spaztik"	Cosmonaut Zero	Yes	5. Blastlands

== Development ==
Amplitude is the sequel to Harmonix's previous title, Frequency, released in 2001. Frequency was funded and published by Sony, and while not a commercial success, was considered by Harmonix's Ryan Lesser as the game that helped to give Harmonix a positive reputation in the game industry. Sony funded and published the game's sequel.

In making the sequel, the team considered lessons they learned from Frequency to make Amplitude more enjoyable. One aspect was the "tunnel" approach they used in Frequency; this was borne out from trying to create a cyberspace-like environment based on concepts from the movie Tron as to help create a synaesthesia for the player. However, on reflection, they found this tunnel to be limiting and claustrophobic; further, in testing an initial prototype for Amplitude, they found that when they left the tunnel, the experience of seeing the tunnel from the outside inspired the idea of vaster landscapes. The tunnel approach also limited an effective means for local multiplayer. This prompted the team to change from the tunnel to a spread-out track for Amplitude. The flatter track enabled players to have a better concept of where they were on the instrument spread, though the decision was criticized by fans of FreQuency.

The second factor they considered was that both Frequency and Amplitude, published at a time where most video game coverage was based on print media, did not come off clearly in static screenshots. The screens appeared confusing and had little personality to them, according to Lesser. They came up with the idea of the "FreQ", an avatar that would be on-screen, performing with the music, as to help create some personality with the game; the FreQs would also help to emphasise the player-vs-player nature during multi-player.

== Reception ==
Amplitude (2003)

Aggregate score
Aggregator	Score
Metacritic	86/100

Review scores
Publication	Score
AllGame	4/5
Edge	8/10
Electronic Gaming Monthly	7.5/10 (Note: Three critics of Electronic Gaming Monthly gave the game each a score of 7.5/10, 8/10, and 7/10.)
Eurogamer	8/10
Game Informer	8.75/10
GameRevolution	B
GameSpot	8.8/10
GameSpy	3/5
GameZone	9.7/10
IGN	9.3/10 (P.O.D.) 7/10
Official U.S. PlayStation Magazine	4/5
X-Play	4/5
The Cincinnati Enquirer	4.5/5
Entertainment Weekly	A−

The game received "favorable" reviews according to the review aggregation website Metacritic. Star Dingo of GamePro called it "a purveyor of positive energy, a game that rewards you for acts of creation instead of destruction...the world would be a happier place with more games like it." (Note: GamePro gave the game 4/5 for graphics, 5/5 for sound, and two 4.5/5 scores for control and fun factor.)

Amplitude sold more units than its predecessor, Frequency, but it wasn't considered a financial success for Harmonix.

GameSpot named it the best PlayStation 2 game of March 2003 in review. It also won the award for "Best Game No One Played" in GameSpot's Best and Worst of 2003 Awards. During the AIAS' 7th Annual Interactive Achievement Awards, the game was nominated for the "Console Family Game of the Year", "Outstanding Achievement in Game Design", and "Outstanding Achievement in Sound Design" awards, all of which went to EyeToy: Play and The Sims Bustin' Out (tie), Prince of Persia: The Sands of Time, and The Lord of the Rings: The Return of the King, respectively.

== Reboot ==
A reboot of the game was released for PlayStation 4 in January 2016, and for PlayStation 3 in April 2016.
