= Kasson Crooker =

American musician

- Also known as: Symbion Project; Komputer Kontroller; Cosmonaut Zero; DJ HMX
- Origin: United States
- Education: Berklee College of Music
- Instrument: Synthesizer
- Label: Speed of Dark Music
- Website: www.symbionproject.com

Kasson Crooker is an American electronic musician, composer, and audio technologist. He has composed and produced music for bands, video games, websites, films, and virtual reality experiences. Crooker's audio technology career has been focused on spatial audio technology, video game development, and interactive music experiences.

== Music career ==
Crooker's music career spans several decades, beginning with his synthpop band Disjointed Images in 1989. His main solo project is Symbion Project which was formed in 1993 and has released eleven full-length albums: Red (1998), Immortal Game (2003), Wound Up by God or the Devil (2006), Misery in Soliloquy (2009), Contrapasso (2011), Semiotic (2015), Arcadian (2016), Gishiki (2017), Backscatter (2019), Saturnine (2022), and Tryptych (2025). In April 2017, Crooker teamed with Micah Knapp and Avielle Heath to create a 360 Virtual Reality music video for a single off of "Arcadian".

In 1999, Crooker formed the synthpop group Freezepop with Liz Enthusiasm and Sean T. Drinkwater. While in the band he went by various aliases, starting as The Duke of Candied Apples, then briefly being known as The Duke of Belgian Waffles, and finally The Duke of Pannekoeken. In September 2009, Crooker retired from Freezepop to focus his efforts on his work at Harmonix. He has made several guest appearances at Freezepop concerts since then, often also playing a Symbion Project set.

Other active bands include ELYXR, Rocococo, Dispak, and Black House Triangle. DJ HMX, Komputer Kontroller, and Cosmonaut Zero were alias monikers used only for the videogames FreQuency (2001) and Amplitude (2003).

Several of his songs are featured in Johannes Grenzfurthner's films Die Gstettensaga: The Rise of Echsenfriedl, Traceroute and Glossary of Broken Dreams.

His other former bands include the dreampop band Sirensong and the more well-known Splashdown, whose albums include Stars and Garters, Halfworld (EP), Redshift (EP), and the unreleased full-length albums Blueshift (which was completed but never released by Capitol Records) and Possibilities (an album of remixes and demos). Other past bands include Larkspur, Khems, and The Planets Won't Let You Sleep Tonight.

== Video game development ==
Crooker was also a project director at video game developer Harmonix and was the project lead on Phase, Rock Band 2, Dance Central, and Dance Central 2 for Kinect/Xbox360. The music of Symbion Project and Freezepop has been featured in the Harmonix PlayStation 2 games FreQuency, Amplitude, the Karaoke Revolution series, Guitar Hero, Guitar Hero 2, Phase, Rock Band; the InCog-developed Downhill Domination; and one of the North American Dance Dance Revolution games developed by Konami, which publishes Karaoke Revolution. He and Eric Brosius took home the 2006 Game Developers Choice Award for Best Audio for their work on Guitar Hero.
