= Music Wizard =

American software development firm

Music Wizard Group
- Type: Subsidiary
- Industry: Software
- Founded: 2005
- Headquarters: Boulder, Colorado, U.S.
- Parent: Allegro Multimedia, inc
- Website: pianowizardacademy.com

Music Wizard Group is a software development firm that develops and publishes software products to teach students to play various musical instruments through MIDI software and a Guitar Hero-like interface. Unlike Guitar Hero, it uses real instruments and teaches to read sheet music as well.

== History ==
Founder and CEO Chris Salter entered Southern Illinois University Carbondale (SIU) in 1978 to study cinematography and began producing films about music. Shortly after, Salter met piano instructor Don Beattie, who came to the School of Music in 1979, and joined a group piano class. He was very inspired by Prof. Beattie's innovative work and approach, and began to take many other music classes, while studying directly with Prof. Beattie for the next 4 years. Parallel with this, he changed his major to Linguistics, and began to study French, Spanish, Chinese, and Japanese languages. It was in this way he got his key insights about developmental linguistics, and became curious about the potential of learning music as if it were a native language. He eventually took so many music courses that he ended up earning a double degree in Music and Linguistics from SIU. Combining his two passions, he was able to enter the nationally recognized Ethnomusicology program at UCLA, win a two-year Organization of American States Fellowship to study abroad in Brazil to do his Master's thesis research, and then returned to get his Master's in Musicology from UCLA in 1990. His insights on his thesis into the role visual cues have on teaching rhythm and guitar in Brazil led him to think about how that might facilitate learning to play other instruments like piano.

Years before, Salter took classes to learn how to type, and failed pretty miserably at it, finding it boring and tedious. With the early Apple computers he played a typing game, and soon he was typing 40 words per minute. It was then that he first had the idea that a piano video game could have the same effect, with the added complexity of precision timing being much more important than with typing. Around this time the MIDI protocol for computers to deal with music was created, and the combination of the two concepts lead to the possibility of a game, with a twist. Salter's idea was to start with a simple game, but then transition to reading music notation, allowing even very young children to learn to play and read music without the traditional necessity of music theory and notation deciphering as a "prerequisite" to playing.

After years of consideration, Salter decided to form a business to develop and manufacture the Piano Commando game (which went on to become Piano Wizard). Salter incorporated his new business in under the name Allegro Multimedia, although the company is better known under the DBA (Doing Business As) Music Wizard.

Understanding how students can benefit from music education, Salter met with Don Beattie, his former piano teacher at the SIU school of music to see how piano teachers could best utilize the game in their classrooms. The plan was to introduce a short week-long summer boot camp at the school. After the success of the boot camp, in the fall of 2005, Don and his wife Delayna founded and directed the Piano Wizard Academy at SIU Carbondale. Over the next 3 years, their work as Academy Directors opened new horizons for young children and adult piano beginners, and they were challenged to "productize" their work, and create a self-sufficient package to allow maximum utility of the video game's potential. Don and Delayna finalized the 100 Song Lesson Series that is now the "Academy music curriculum" for the game. Music Wizard and the Beatties then collaborated in the development of a series of 50 Tutorial DVD and Songbook lessons for the Academy Music Library. These materials were meant to empower parents, non-music educators and piano teachers alike to leverage the compressed concrete learning engendered by the game with the icing of musical artistic technique, and music theory as needed. This has proven to be a dramatic success, with hundreds of positive reviews, and testimonials. In particular, homeschool families and special needs communities have embraced this warmly due to the ease, affordability and sometimes dramatic success possible using these tools.

== Products ==
=== Piano Wizard ===
Released in 2005, this educational software helps teach the student to play the piano through a patented 4-step learning approach. While the software was available separately, a bundle was made available that included an M-Audio Keystation 49e keyboard. This software is no longer sold separately since the development of the full Piano Wizard Academy.

=== Piano Wizard Academy ===
The Piano Wizard Academy version is more popular as it introduces another critical level of music learning, i.e. "Step 5" where the student is helped to get off the game, and read sheet music at the piano. This allows many more musical elements of playing to be introduced by the parent or facilitator, ensuring a deeper more artistic experience rather than just playing a video game. In addition to the core software, it also includes over 50 video lessons and sheet music, to demonstrate how to move children, adults or themselves through the levels of the game, and then to transition off the game to playing a real piano and reading basic musical notation.

The academy version allows unlimited import of MIDI files. The concept is to allow the use of these files as a tool for the student to play (on piano) virtually any song written in Western notation once imported into the program. The game's engine automatically renders game objects and music notes from the imported MIDI file. Currently there are hundreds of thousands of MIDI files online, comprising one thousand years of classical music repertoire, available for free or low cost. The software allows almost any MIDI file to be opened, with the various tracks available for background play or to learn, and it adjusts to multiple common digital keyboard sized, making the software extremely versatile. The 100 song Easy Mode curriculum included is the equivalent of about 2 years children's piano lessons, though most go through this in less than six months or a year because of the game's ability to dramatically shorten and eliminate the normal practice times needed to master a song. They each have fingering indications built in for every note, an option useful for transitioning from the color coded phases to reading black music notation. The Piano Wizard Academy package includes another 100 song, and most are custom arranged to fit easily within a 4 octave keyboard. Imported MIDI files, however, are more like a "box of chocolates" in that these were designed by thousands of music enthusiasts over the last couple of decades and uploaded and shared without any filtering or quality control, so the quality of any MIDI file ranges dramatically. That said, this open source approach of Music Wizard allows for a much longer and more varied use of the product, making it potentially a music learning system for life.

In 2007, Fisher-Price licensed the 4-step method for use in their I Can Play Piano product.

A touchscreen Piano Wizard app is currently in development for iPhone and Android platforms.

==== Impact of music training on cognitive development ====
A number of customers in the home school market tried the game to see if the simple, visual game like style of the system would allow even special needs children access to the benefits of music education. While not designed specifically for this market, a surprising number of sometimes dramatic stories of cognitive development have emerged spontaneously from customer testimonials . While these success stories with Piano Wizard are anecdotal, not scientific, they are compelling, and often very moving. There is significant scientific research on the effects of music training, especially piano, on the brain. The newest advances in neuroscience, especially the latest technologies like functional MRI, Petscans, diagnostic EKGs, etc. allow scientists to measure the "neuroplasticity" and impact of music on cognitive development. In fact, music training is emerging as a kind of supertonic, having a "metaplastic" effect on the brain, impacting many other areas of cognitive competence, with lifelong benefits. The company is exploring participating in more rigorous and formal neuroscience studies to test the hypothesis that the game system allows a much wider range of people to obtain these known music training benefits faster, easier and more cost effectively. In particular, they are looking not only at participating in studies of early cognitive development, but those with people who have autism, Down syndrome, other special needs, even seniors with dementia, Alzheimer's, stroke or other forms of brain trauma or damage. The company is currently seeking research partners and non-profits interested in engaging in these more formal kinds of studies.

=== Guitar Wizard ===
Guitar Wizard is intended to teach guitar skills. The software version is under development, but there was a toy version called Mattel's I Can Play Guitar, aimed at young children, which has now been discontinued.

A package in development by the manufacturer will bundle the software with an acoustic guitar with a MIDI pickup or guitar controller.

== See also ==
- Guitar Rising
