= Guitar controller =

Type of video game controller

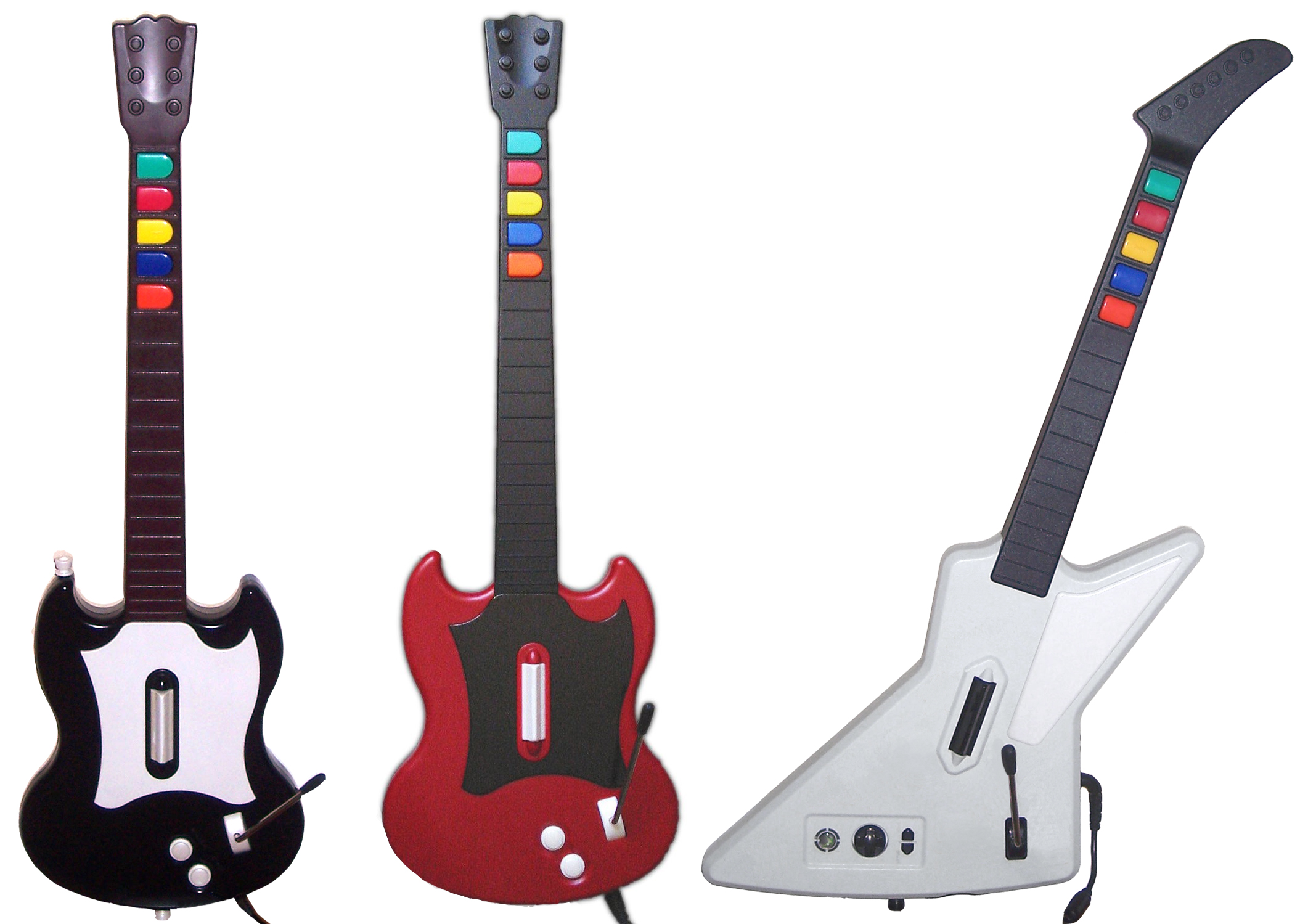
The guitar controllers bundled with Guitar Hero releases (from left to right): Gibson SGs for Guitar Hero & Guitar Hero II (PlayStation 2) and Gibson X-Plorer for Guitar Hero II (Xbox 360) and Guitar Hero III: Legends of Rock (PC)

A guitar controller is a video game controller designed to simulate the playing of the guitar, a string musical instrument. Guitar controllers are often used for music games such as Guitar Hero, Rock Band, Um Jammer Lammy: NOW! and GuitarFreaks. The controllers are played by holding down a colored fret button that matches a colored, on-screen note, while pressing the strum bar as the note passes through the target. The controllers also feature a whammy bar, which is used to bend notes and collect each game's equivalent of bonus energy. Different games and models of controllers have introduced additional features, such as effects switches, additional fret buttons, and fret touch pads. The fret buttons are colored usually in the order of (from lowest to highest pitch) green, red, yellow, blue, and orange.

== Implementation as game controllers ==
A guitar controller is almost always an adaption of existing regular controller technologies for a given home video game console—all features of the guitar are implemented using features found on a standard game controller. Generally speaking, the following apply:

- Fret buttons are implemented as the standard action buttons on the controller. For example, the buttons on a guitar controller for the Xbox 360 map to the face buttons and left shoulder buttons on the standard Xbox 360 controller.
- The whammy bar is implemented as an axis, used for adding variation to pitch on "long notes".
- The meta buttons (start, select, back) map directly to their standard controller counterparts. A guitar controller for a Wii music game often conveniently has the meta buttons supplied by the Wii Remote itself, which is inserted into a conveniently shaped cavity in the controller.

Other vendor-specific features can be implemented using standard controls, or combinations of them. For example, the solo bar on a Rock Band guitar controller is implemented using the same controller buttons as the main fret buttons, plus an additional modifier key, whereas the slide bar from recent versions of Guitar Hero is simply another axis. Guitar controllers also have a "gesture" feature in which the player can tilt or gently shake the guitar neck, which is used in most guitar games to activate a power-up mode, such as Star Power in Guitar Hero games or Overdrive in Rock Band games. This function is also usually mapped to an axis, or the Wii Remote's motion sensors for Wii-remote based guitar controllers.

== Variations ==
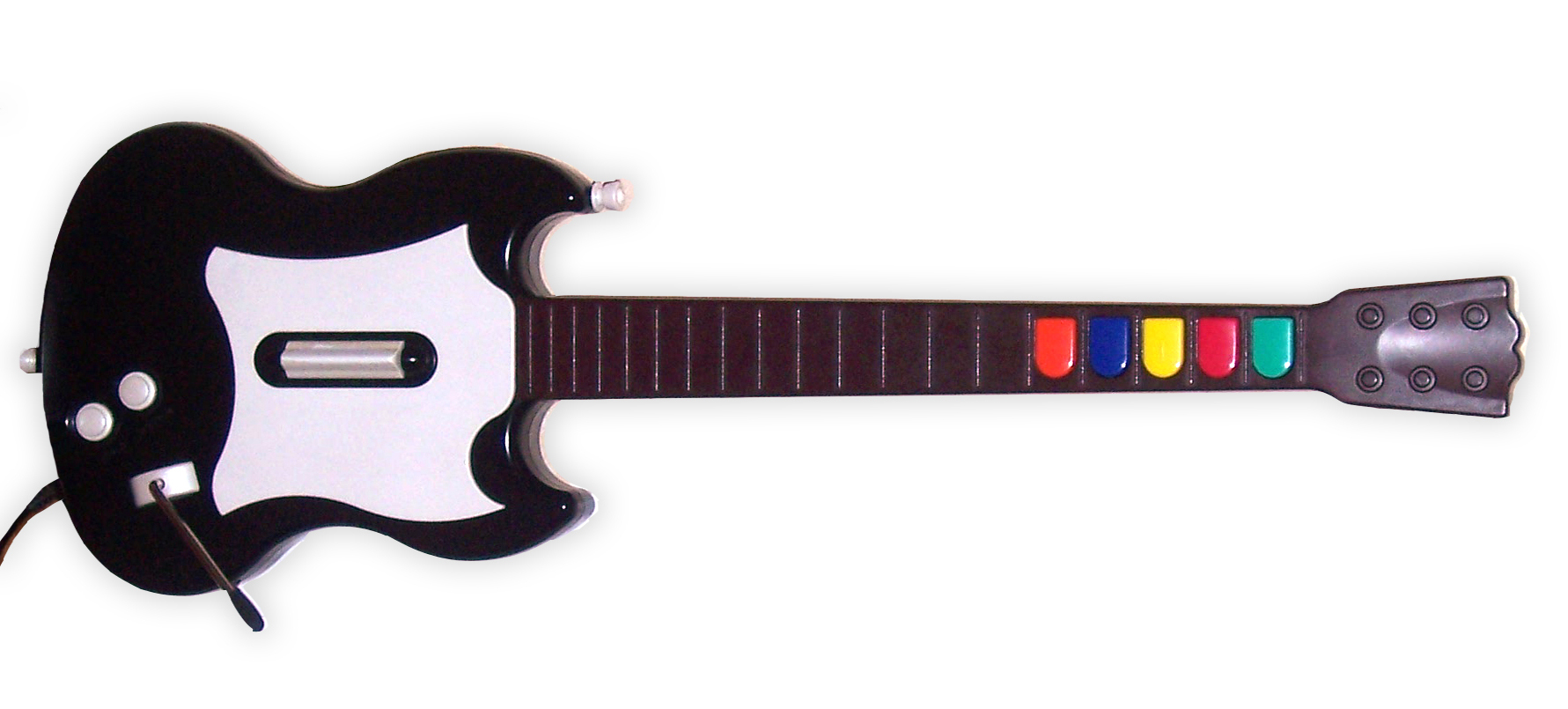
Guitar Hero controller that comes with the game. The guitar resembles a Gibson SG

=== Guitar Hero (PlayStation 2) ===
The Harmonix Guitar Hero Guitar Controller was a 3/4 scale replica of a Gibson SG. The controller has 5 buttons under the tuning pegs, on the neck of the guitar. These buttons are as follows: green, red, yellow, blue, and orange. Then, at the bottom of the guitar are as follows: a Start button, a Select button, a whammy bar, and a strum bar.

=== Guitar Hero II (PlayStation 2 & Xbox 360) ===
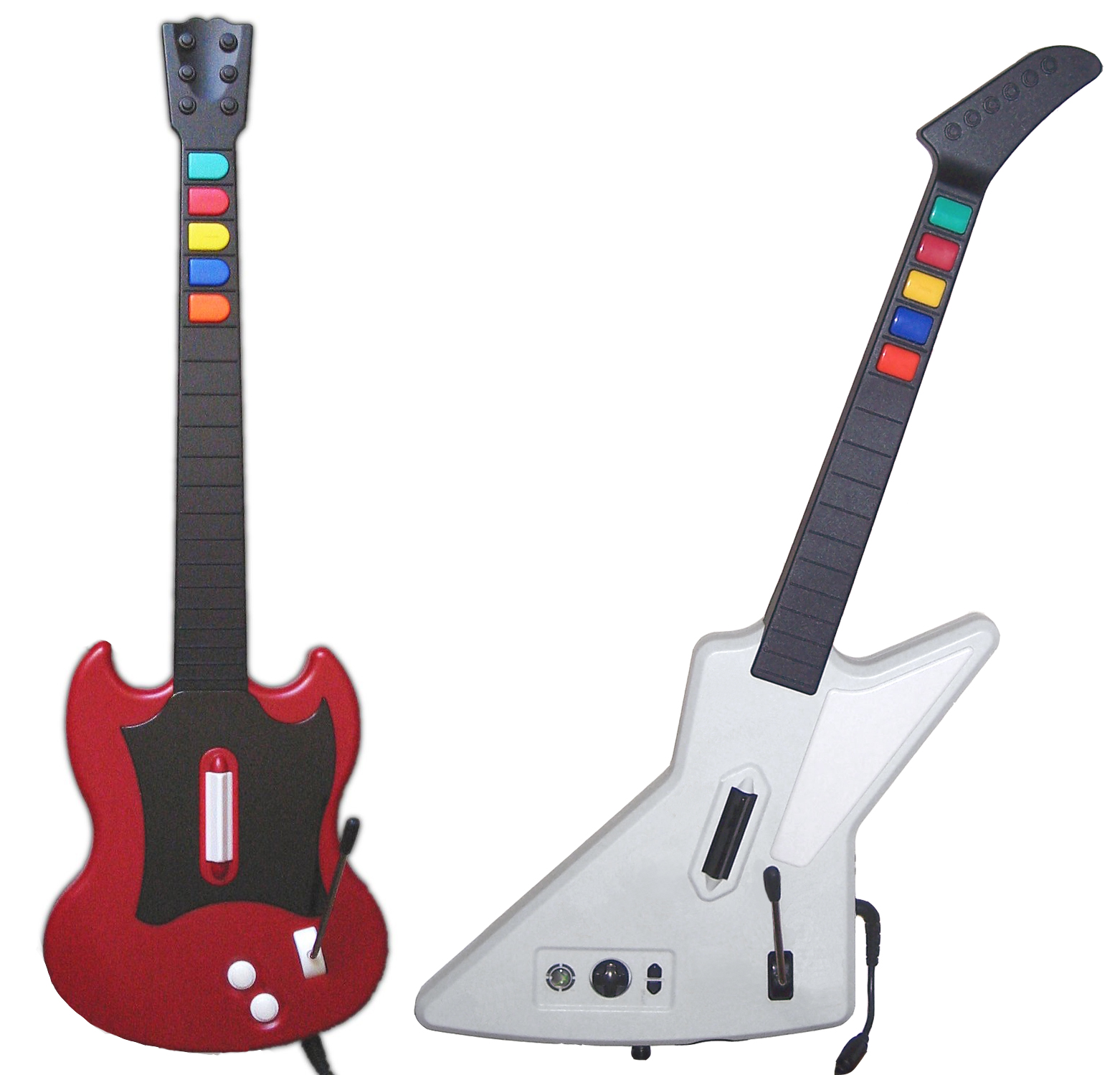
The guitar controllers bundled with Guitar Hero II. On the left is a cherry red Gibson SG, which comes with the PlayStation 2 version. On the right is a Gibson X-Plorer, which comes with the Xbox 360 version.

The Harmonix Guitar Hero II guitar controller has two different variations. The first being for the PlayStation 2 which has the same layout as the previous model, but the guitar's design is different. This guitar was based on a red Gibson SG.

Guitar Hero II was also released for Xbox 360 and had a separate design and layout. The design of the guitar resembles a Gibson X-Plorer with a layout of the head having the default 5 fret buttons, a strum bar, and a whammy bar, but now a button with the Xbox 360 Guide with 4 lights surrounding it (which represents which player your controller is), a D-Pad, a Back button, and a Start button.

=== Guitar Hero III: Legends of Rock (PlayStation 2 and 3, Wii, Xbox 360, Microsoft Windows & Mac OS X) ===
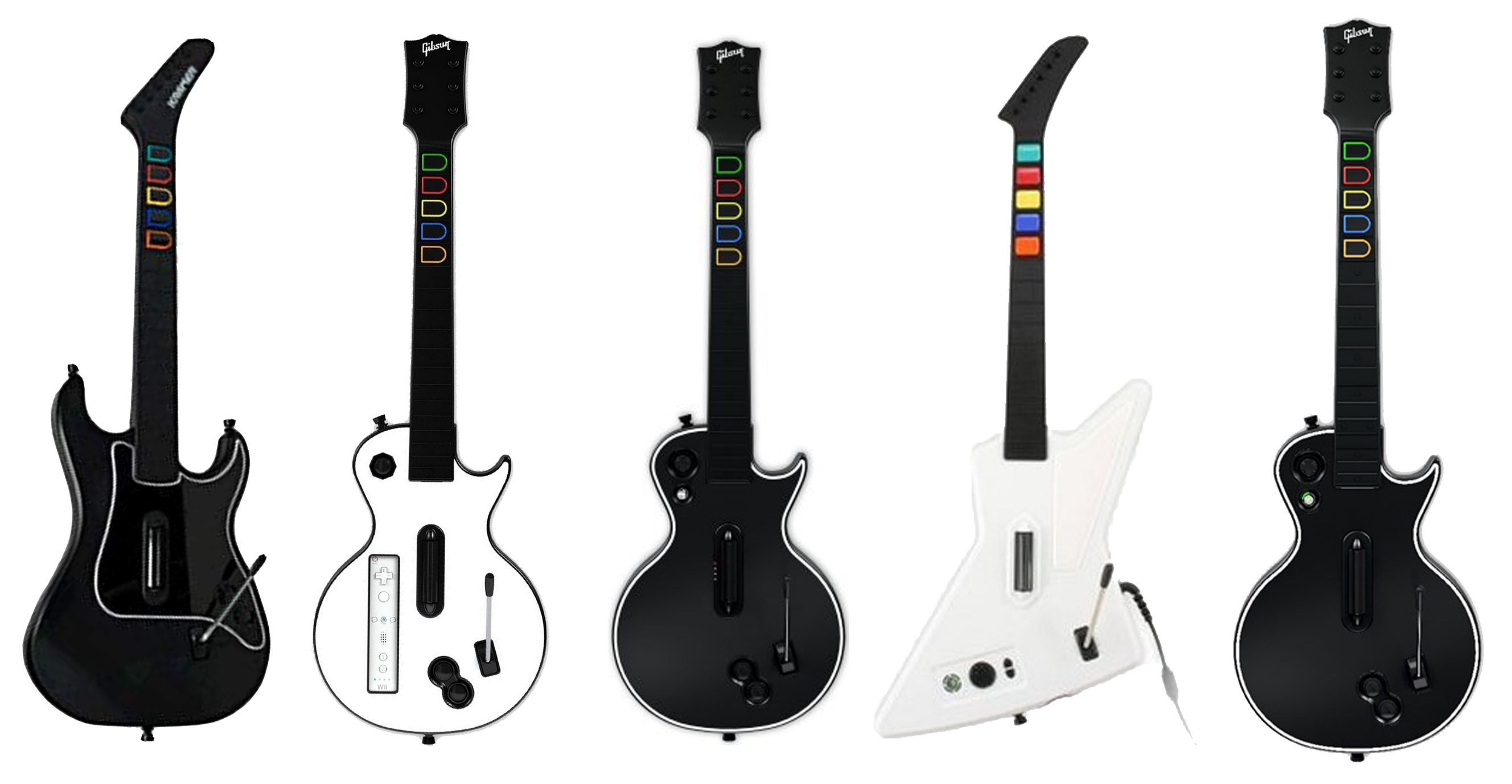
The guitar controllers bundled with Guitar Hero III: Legends of Rock; black Kramer Baretta Special (PS2), White Gibson Les Paul (Wii), Black Gibson Les Paul (PS3), White Gibson X-Plorer (Windows/Mac OS X), and Black Gibson Les Paul (Xbox 360)

Guitar Hero III had 3 different types of guitars. 1 of them having 3 color designs. The first guitar was for the PlayStation 2. It resembled Gibson's Kramer model and had the same layout as its predecessor.

The guitar for Windows and Mac OS X was the same guitar that came with the Xbox 360's version of Guitar Hero II.

The PlayStation 3, Xbox 360, and Wii all had the same design, that resembled a Gibson Les Paul. The difference between the three was the color. The Wii came with a white body and a black head. The Wii's controller, unlike the other models, had a cut out for the Wii remote and would use the remote as its D-Pad, Start, Back, and Guide button. Although it still had a start and back button built into it. The Xbox 360's controller had the same layout as its predecessor, but the design was a black Gibson Les Paul. The PlayStation 3's controller had the same layout as the Xbox 360, but it was a slightly lighter black.

=== The Guitar Hero: On Tour trilogy (Nintendo DS) and the Nintendo DS version of Band Hero ===
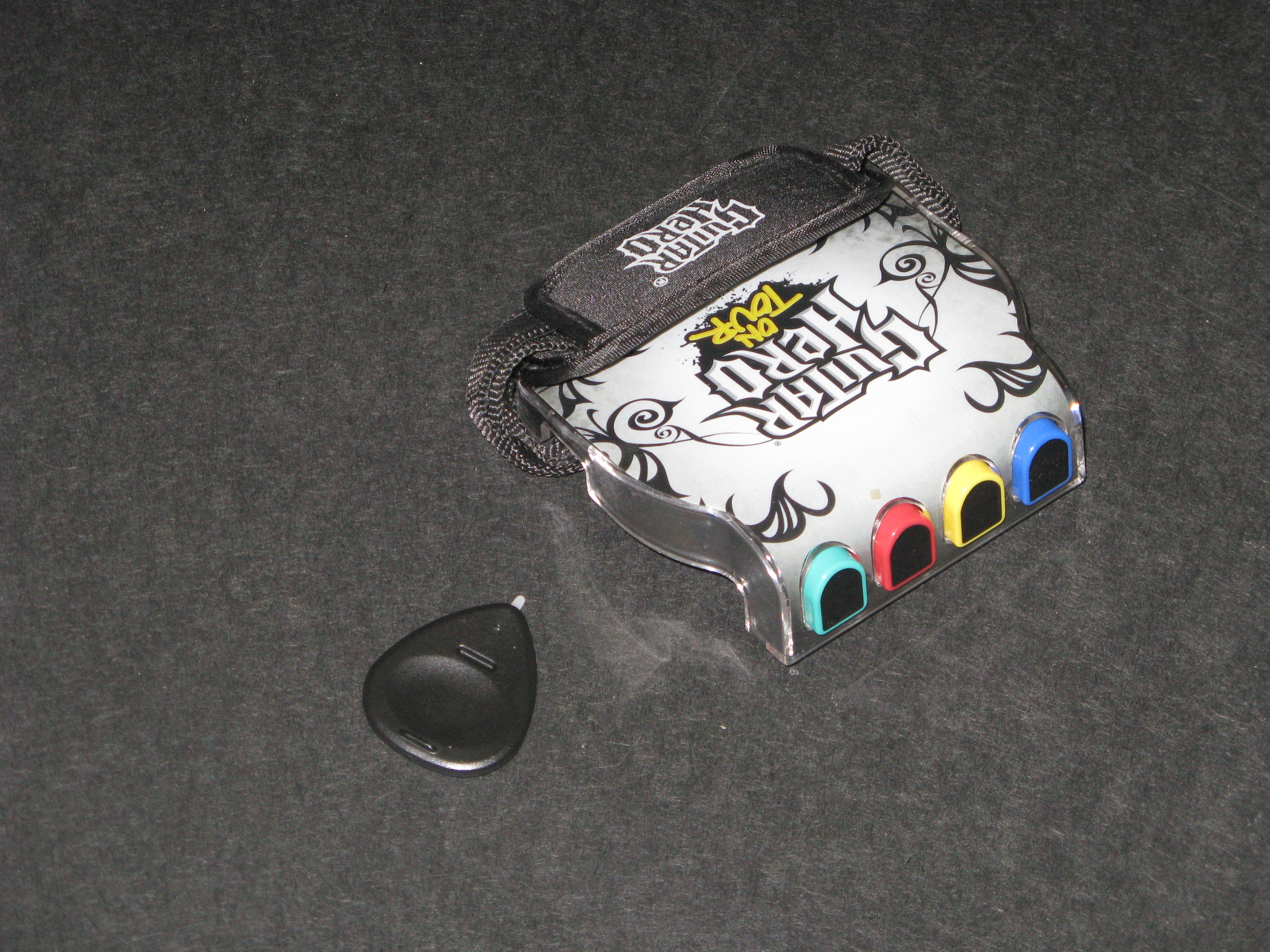
The Guitar Grip and guitar pick-shaped stylus for the DS-exclusive Guitar Hero: On Tour trilogy and the DS version of Band Hero

Vicarious Visions developed a special guitar controller accessory for the Nintendo DS handheld, called the Guitar Grip, and it is used for a spin-off Guitar Hero trilogy subtitled On Tour, released exclusively for that platform, as well as the Nintendo DS version of Band Hero. The Guitar Grip is a special attachment that connects to the DS' backwards compatible Game Boy Advance Game Pak slot (thus making the On Tour games incompatible with both Nintendo DSi models and the Nintendo 3DS family), allowing the player to hold the system sideways like an open book and use its bottom half as a guitar neck. Four fret buttons on the attachment are positioned below the touchscreen, which is used to strum the guitar and play on-screen notes while any fret buttons are pressed. The Guitar Grip concept underwent many changes before Vicarious Visions was able to determine a comfortable design for it with great difficulty.

=== Guitar Hero World Tour (PlayStation 2 and 3, Wii, Xbox 360, Microsoft Windows & Mac OS X) ===
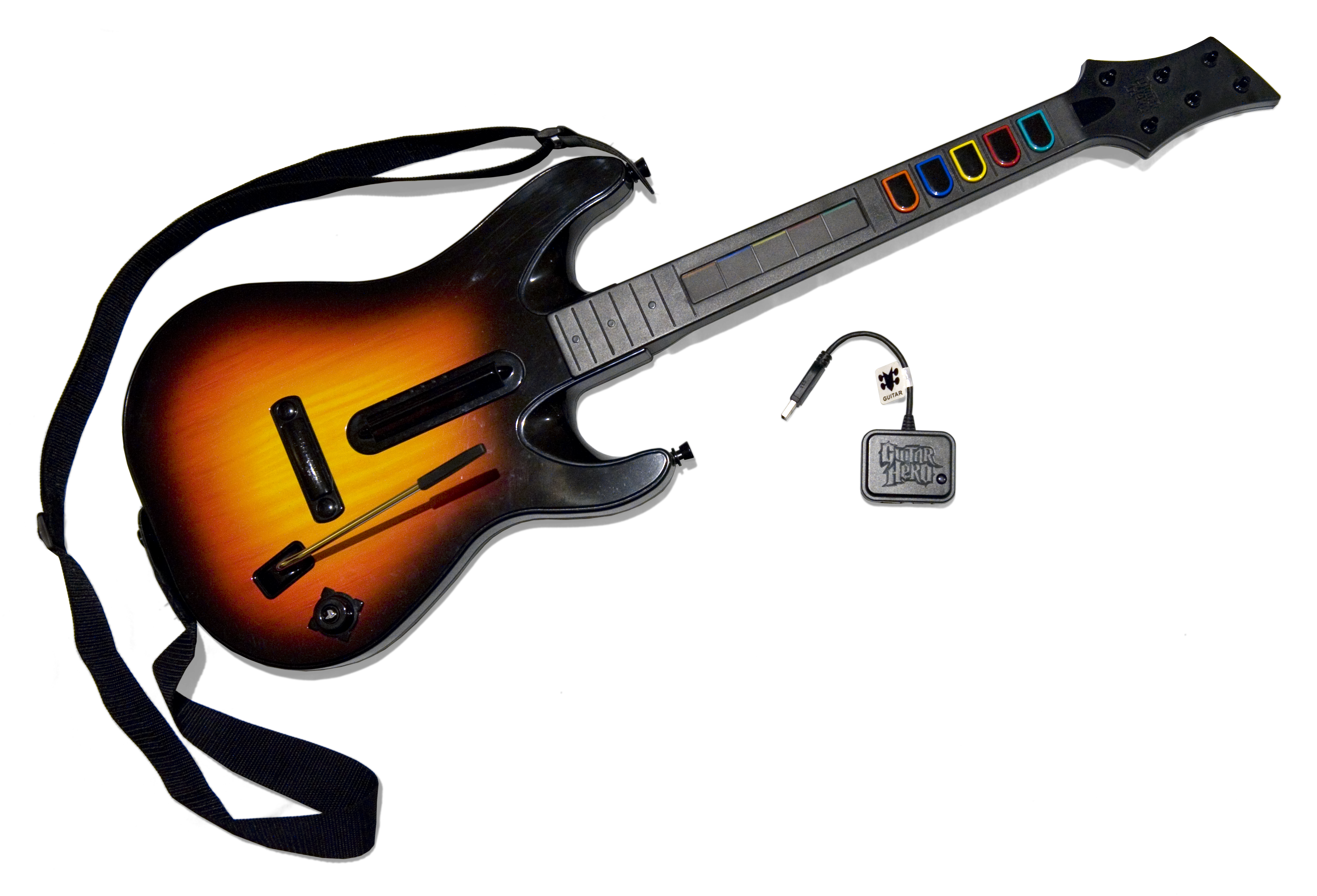
Guitar Hero World Tour controller that is bundled with the PlayStation 3

The guitar for Guitar Hero World Tour was a new design that was the same across all consoles, except Wii which had a cut out for the Wii Remote. The new guitar though had some new features and improvements. First off, the guitar was 25% larger, making it closer to the size of a real guitar. Secondly, the guitar now has a longer whammy bar and a new Star Power button. Third, under the standard fret buttons, a touchpad was implemented letting players execute notes via tapping or also known as tap strumming. Connectivity issues were resolved. The design of the guitar was an original design created by the developers of Guitar Hero, but they took ideas from the Fender Stratocaster.

=== Guitar Hero 5 (PlayStation 2 and 3, Wii & Xbox 360) ===
The guitar for Guitar Hero 5 was an adaptation of the Guitar Hero World Tour Guitar. The only changes to this one was a rubberized strum bar, the nuts on the head of the guitar were replaced with chrome instead of the plastic design, the switches on the strum bar were changed to be longer lasting and the "Solo section" of the neck had a different mold and was converted from its analog design to digital.

=== Guitar Hero: Warriors of Rock (Xbox 360, PlayStation 3 & Wii) ===
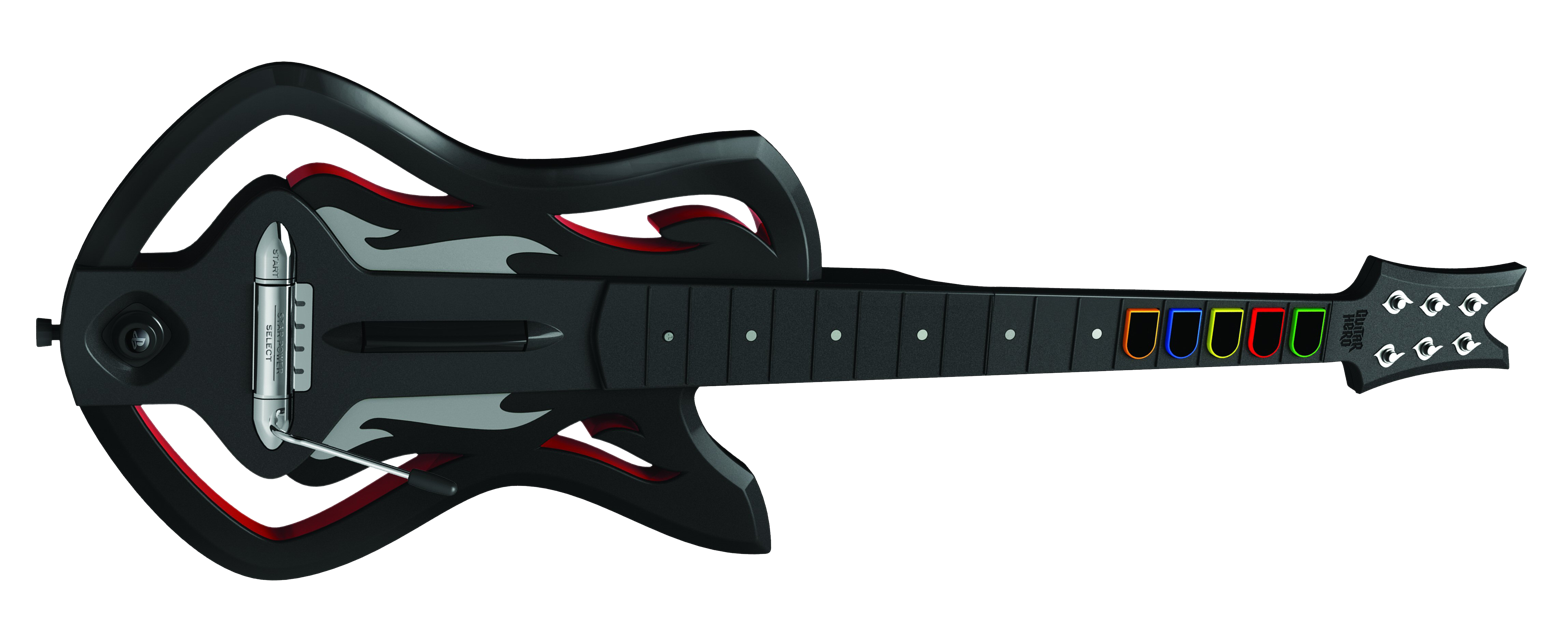
PS3 version of the Guitar Hero: Warriors of Rock controller

The guitar for Guitar Hero: Warriors of Rock was developed by Neversoft, the developers of Guitar Hero: Warriors of Rock. It was a huge redesign for the series as it looked like an ax rather than the classic design of electric guitars. The "Solo section" on the guitar was removed. The d-pad and guide button were merged into one.

=== Guitar Hero Live (iOS, Xbox 360 and One, PlayStation 3 and 4 & Wii U) ===
Guitar Hero Live's guitar controller is not licensed or based on any existing guitars, and departs from the typical five button fret style. Six fret buttons are arranged into a three by two grid at the top of the neck, with the left side represented by black, and the right side represented by white markings. The body and controls feature a standard strum bar, whammy bar, and have a new "Star Power" button under the strum bar. A menu button is included to navigate the Guitar Hero TV mode.

=== Rock Band (Xbox 360, PlayStation 2 and 3 & Wii) ===
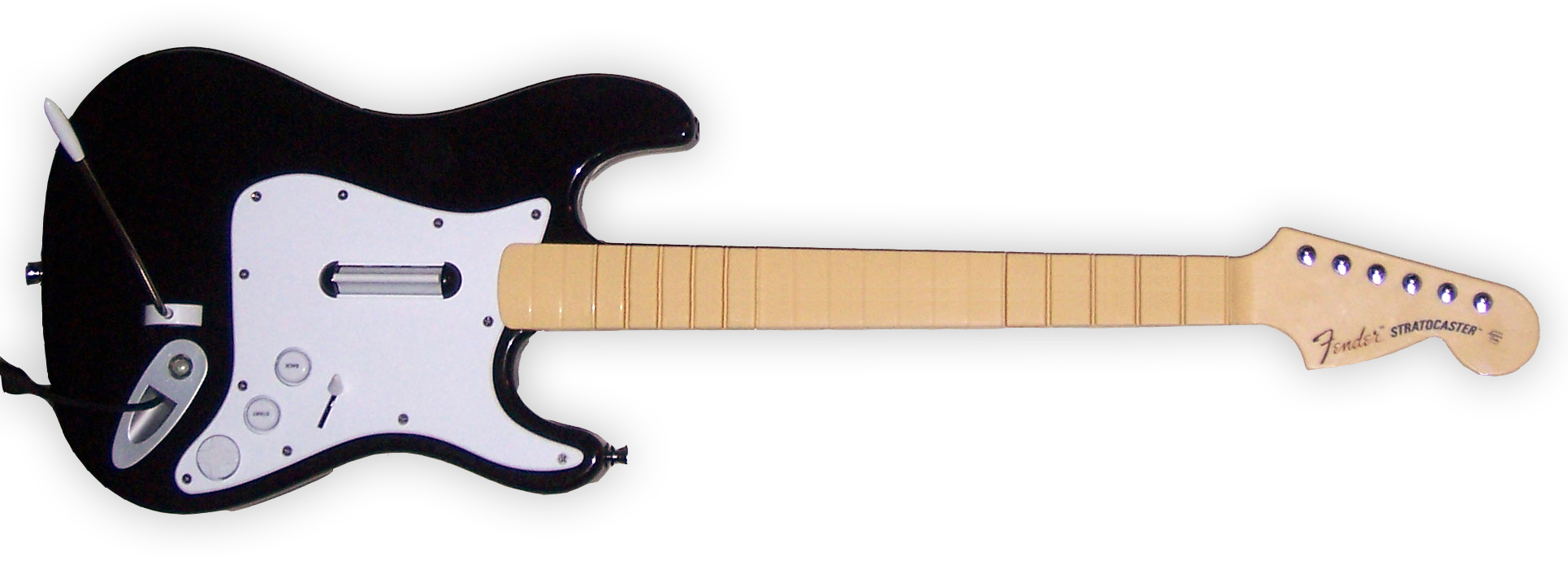
Xbox 360 Rock Band 1 Fender Sratocaster controller

The Rock Band guitar controller is used for both lead guitar and bass instrument gameplay. The guitar is a 3/4 scale replica of a Fender Stratocaster. It takes design cues from the Guitar Hero controllers, with five fret buttons at the top of the neck, a strum bar on the body, and a whammy bar, as well as navigational buttons. Unlike Guitar Hero controllers, an additional five fret buttons were added at the base of the neck. The lower frets are referred to as "solo buttons", which can be used for tapping (a technique where a string is fretted and set into vibration as part of a single motion) during solo sections. The controller also included a 5-way switch which can be used to select different guitar sounds.

=== Rock Band 2 (Xbox 360, PlayStation 2 and 3 & Wii) ===
The Fender Stratocaster guitar controllers created for Rock Band 2 are nearly identical to their Rock Band predecessor. Notable cosmetic changes include a sunburst printed variant, in addition to the original black design. Both variants also have a simulated darker fretboard printed over the neck, and a wood grain pattern printed on the front of the headstocks. The headstocks can be removed from the neck. The fret buttons themselves were improved, featuring raised markings on the third (yellow) fret and quieter mechanics. The strum bars were also improved, designed to be more durable. Overdrive motion activation sensitivity was also improved. A 3.5mm port was added on the lower right side of the guitar body, for connecting to a Stompbox Effect pedal peripheral or bass drum pedal peripheral. Input through the port activates overdrive in game. The Rock Band 2 guitar controller is backward compatible with Rock Band.

A full size Fender Stratocaster guitar controller was offered for Rock Band 2, built out of Stratocaster parts, excluding functional guitar electronics, fretwire, strings, or a nut. The 1:1 Stratocaster was offered only in a handpainted sunburst, assembled at a Fender manufacturing facility. A functional whammy bar is built into the bridge plate, and the start and back buttons appear to be volume and tone dials. The D-pad and guide button are standard controller buttons.

Mad Catz began producing Fender Precision Bass controllers for Rock Band 2. Similar to the Stratocaster controllers, the Precision Bass controllers featured the same general layout, on a scaled-down replica Precision Bass. Wired and wireless variants were produced, with wireless Rock Band 2 variants having a unique dongle for connection, and a switch to select Rock Band or Rock Band 2 modes. When used in Rock Band 2 mode in Rock Band 2, the game selects the bass part by default. The headstocks have four decorative tuners, including tuner pegs, which are not seen on the Stratocaster controllers. The Precision Bass controllers featured a split strum bar, intended to imitate bass picking styles with two half-size strum bars making up the strum bar. The front strumbar has inverted output. The controller also included a bass thumb rest, and replaced the whammy bar with a whammy knob. The Start/Back buttons are handled through another knob, and the 5-way switch is handled through a third "FX-knob". The Precision Basses were offered in white, black, candy apple red, seafoam green, and metallic pink.

=== The Beatles: Rock Band (Xbox 360, PlayStation 3 & Wii) ===
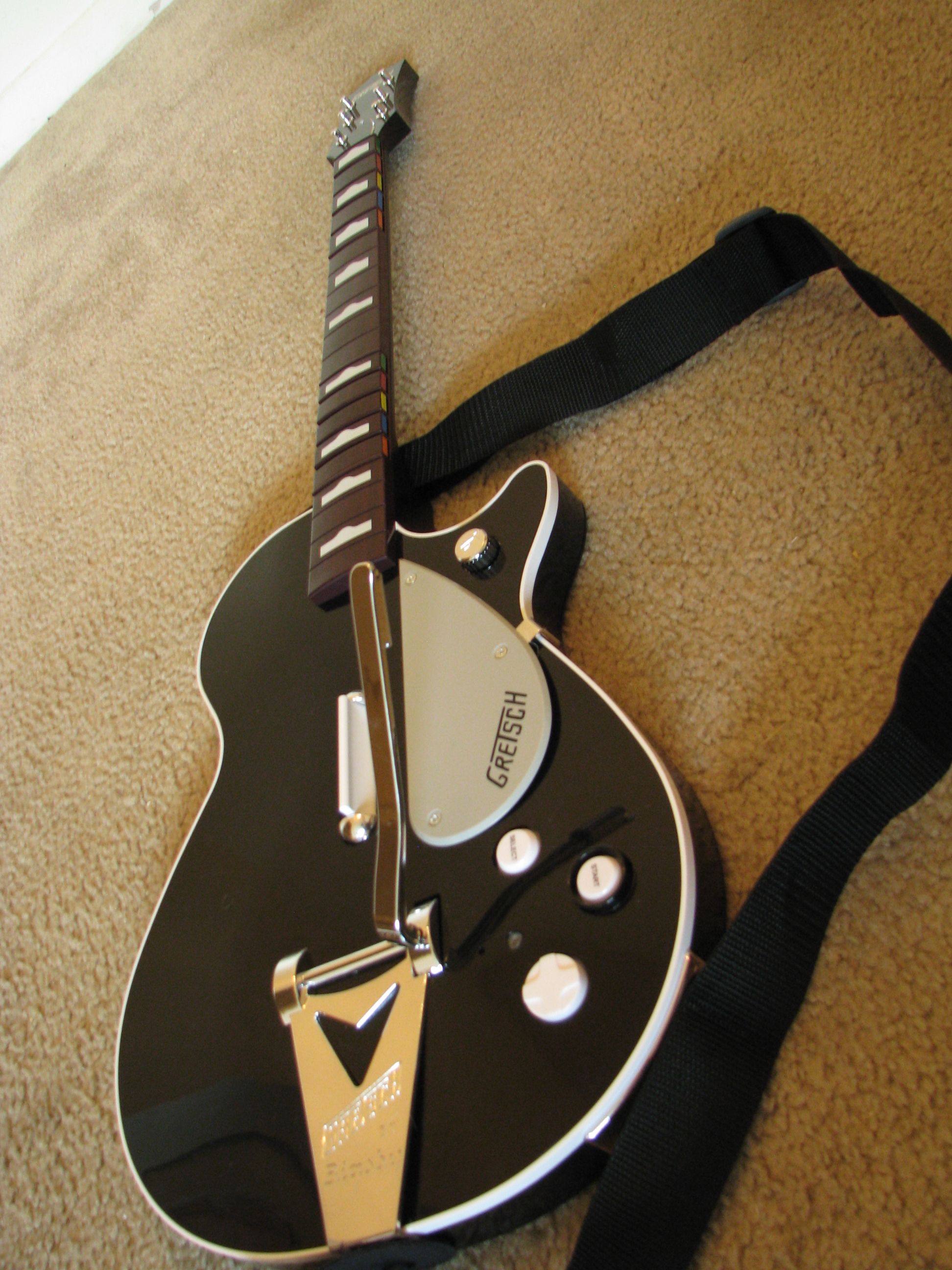
Gretsch Duo Jet guitar controller for The Beatles: Rock Band

The Beatles: Rock Band guitar controllers used the same layout and mechanical features as the Rock Band 2 Stratocaster controllers, but featured designs based on guitars notable for use by The Beatles. Each guitar controller was scaled down from the instruments inspiring them. The first announced was a bass controller modeled after Paul McCartney's Höfner 500/1, though in a right-handed configuration. A Rickenbacker 325 was produced, modeled after the guitar used by John Lennon. George Harrison's Gretsch Duo Jet was also represented.

=== Rock Band 3 (Xbox 360, PlayStation 3 & Wii) ===
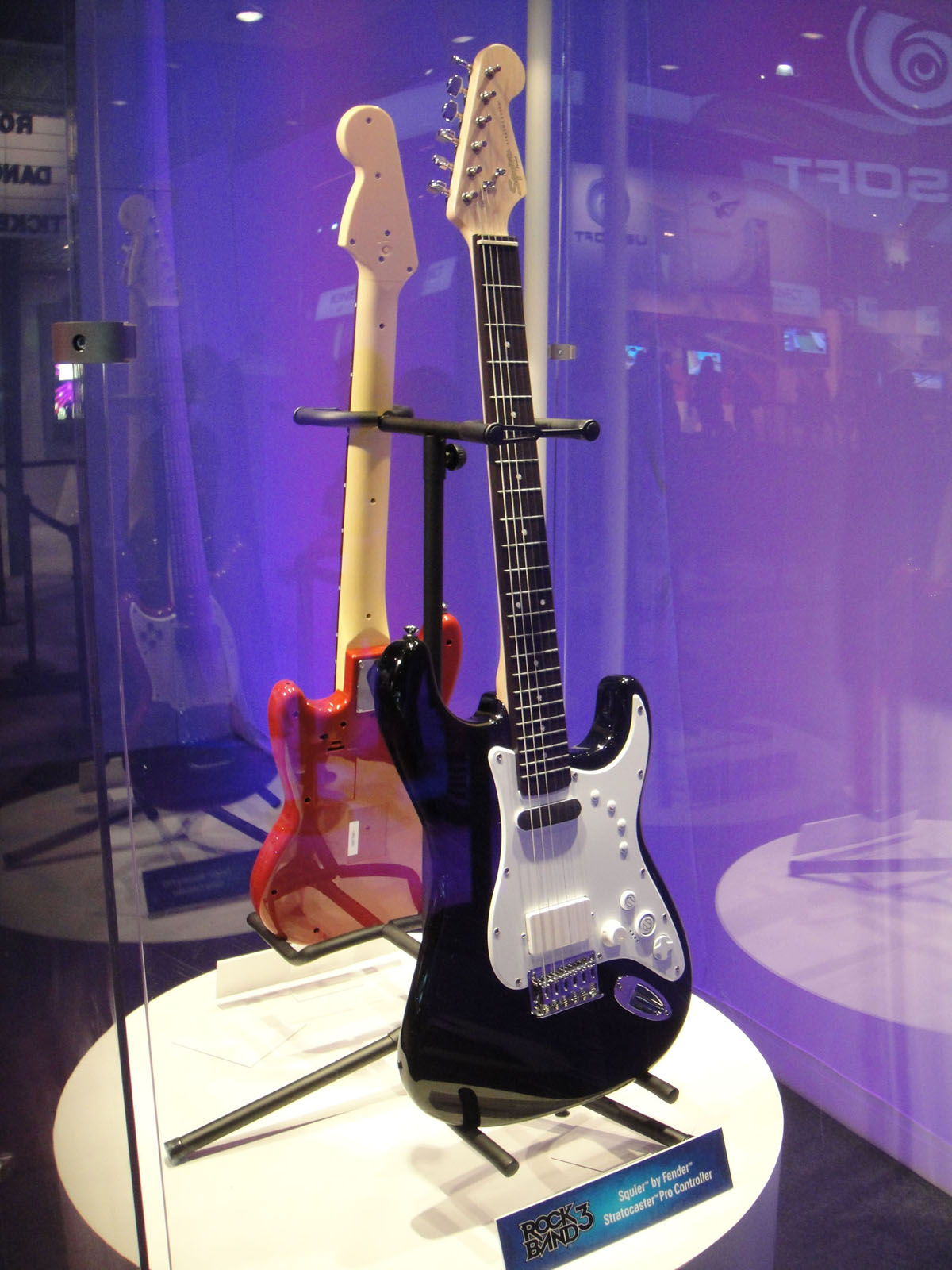
Pro guitar controllers for Rock Band 3

Rock Band 3 introduced "Pro" mode for guitar and bass, developing two new controllers to play the expanded modes, which were not compatible with previous or basic guitar controllers. The keys and pro keys were also added, with basic guitar controllers able to play keys parts in all-instruments mode or after unlocking the option in normal gameplay.

The 3/4 Fender Stratocaster guitar controllers were produced again, with further improvements made to the strum bar and fret buttons, making them quieter and more durable. The sunburst design did not return, instead being offered in hot rod red, blue, or the classic black.

The Fender Precision Bass controllers were improved and produced again, with reworked connections, improved strum bars and fret buttons, and Xbox 360 models included a 3.5mm headphone port opposite the overdrive port for gameplay audio.

A new Fender Telecaster "Premium Telecaster Player's Edition" guitar controller was offered, in gunmetal, light blue, and butterscotch. It features a similar layout to the Stratocaster controllers, and Xbox 360 models include the 3.5mm headphone port from the Precision Bass. The Telecaster controller features unique "fast action SHREDDERZ" fret buttons, which are springloaded, but are slanted and can only be pressed down on the left side of the fretboard. The Telecaster controller also features a touch sense overdrive button resembling a pickup between the neck and strum bar. It features a unique Bigsby "F" whammy tailpiece, instead of the Fender Vibrato whammy bar seen on the Stratocaster. The 5-way switch is referred to as an "FX-switch" in the manual.

Two types of pro guitar controllers were produced, with the first being the Fender Mustang Pro Guitar Controller. Like the majority of other guitar controllers, it is scaled down, though it is larger than the 3/4 Stratocasters. Instead of the typical five fret button and strum bar configuration, it has six sets of 17 rows of fret buttons, adding up to 102 individual fret buttons. Each set is aligned with a synthetic string in the string box, where the strum bar would normally be located. This layout emulates the fretting patterns and playing style of the Mustang. The D-pad is used to navigate in game menus, while four extra action buttons were added to the pickguard, as the strings and fret buttons cannot be used to navigate. Frets one to five on any set may be used in conjunction with their string to play the standard guitar and bass parts, with frets 12 to 17 functioning as the solo buttons. There is no whammy functionality. Microphone and automatic light calibration sensors are included in the pickguard. The 3.5mm overdrive port can be used to trigger overdrive, as can the back button, or motion controls. The controller also features a 5-pin MIDI out, allowing it to function as a general MIDI controller. It was only offered with a red body, white pickguard, and chrome plates.

The second pro guitar controller is the Squier Fender Stratocaster Guitar and Controller. A full size functioning Stratocaster guitar, it has both a 1/4" audio output port, and a 5-pin MIDI out port. The bridge is fixed, with no vibrato arm, as the pro guitar and bass modes do not have the whammy function. The pickguard has a singular knob for volume, with no 5-way switch or additional tone knobs as typically seen on Stratocasters. The pickguard also has a D-pad, start/back buttons represented by arrows, and four colored action buttons. Under the strings on the pickguard, the Stratocaster Guitar and Controller has a singular pickup, marked "hexaphonic" on the back. This pickup is located just above the bridge. Just under the neck is a springloaded foam mute, which stops continuous vibrations from triggering repeated MIDI messages while the controller is on. It can be pushed in to lock it into an up or down position. The fretboard is plastic, and the fingerboard senses finger positions divided into 22 frets. All information is outputted as MIDI signals, requiring the MIDI Pro Adapter peripheral to send the signals to Rock Band 3. The Guitar and Controller cannot be used to play standard guitar or bass modes, unlike the Mustang controller. The Stratocaster Guitar and Controller also does not feature the 3.5mm overdrive port.

=== Rock Band 4 (Xbox One & PlayStation 4) ===
As stated by Harmonix, they did not want to "reinvent the wheel". The guitar for Rock Band 4 would still be the same original Fender Stratocaster design, but with improvements to the fret buttons and strum bar. The construction was changed to allow for removeable and replaceable pickguards.

In 2016, Harmonix and Mad Catz stopped working together to produce and develop controllers, with that role instead going to PDP. Coinciding with the Rock Band Rivals expansion, PDP released a Fender Jaguar controller. The Jaguar controller featured a foldable neck that stores under the body, and could included an optional rechargeable battery pack and charging dock. Other new features include an improved auto-calibration light sensor. The Jaguar controller was offered in ultra-marine blue, candy cola red, and charcoal.

=== Fortnite Festival (multiple platforms) ===
In January 2024, Harmonix and peripheral maker PDP announced the PDP Riffmaster as an improved guitar controller for use in Fortnite Festival and Rock Band 4, with Festival compatibility introduced in April 2024 with the introduction of "Pro Lead" and "Pro Bass" parts (not to be confused with Rock Band 3's "Pro" parts). Notable changes include an analog stick in the back of the controller's head, a 3.5mm audio port, a removable faceplate with storage space for the wireless receiver, and a foldable neck for storage. The guitar comes in two forms: One compatible with the Xbox One, Xbox Series X/S and PC, and one compatible with PlayStation 4 and PlayStation 5 that includes a switch to change between the two console generations - third-party software has since been developed to make PlayStation 4/5 guitars compatible with PC.

In December 2024, peripheral maker CRKD (whose team consists of some of the original members of Red Octane) announced a new add-on for their Neo S controllers that is compatible with Fortnite Festival. It consists of a five button layout - with each button corresponding to a note lane in Festival's standard "pad" parts - and is similar both in functionality and looks to the Guitar Hero: On Tour Guitar Grip. Later in January 2025, CRKD then announced a series of Les Paul-inspired controllers in collaboration with Gibson Guitars, compatible with Fortnite Festival's "Pro" parts, previous Rock Band and Guitar Hero titles, and community-developed titles such as Clone Hero and YARG. The guitar comes in both a standard "Encore" and advanced "Pro" edition, features a swappable neck that allows for different fret styles, and comes in versions compatible with Xbox One, Xbox Series X/S, PC and PC handheld devices, Apple and Android devices, Nintendo Switch, and PlayStation 3, 4, and 5.

In June 2025, peripheral maker Hyperkin announced the creation of a Telecaster-inspired controller in collaboration with Fender, planned to allow multiplatform support and swappable components.

== Use as a musical instrument ==
Numerous attempts have been made to adapt guitar controllers for use as legitimate musical instruments. These attempts range from simple solutions that output a single note or sound for each button on the controller, to more complicated applications, such as MIDItar Hero and Armchair Guitarist that attempt to fully adapt the controller to use as an instrument, with a wide range of notes and playing styles.
