= Guitar Hero =

Series of rhythm video games

- Logo used in Guitar Hero Live
- Genre: Rhythm
- Developers: Harmonix (2005–2007); Neversoft (2007–2010); Budcat Creations (2007–2009); Vicarious Visions (2007–2010); Aspyr (2007–2008); Beenox (2009); FreeStyleGames (2009–2017); Exient Entertainment (2009); Underground Development (2009)
- Publishers: RedOctane (2005–2006); Activision (2006–present); Aspyr (2007–2008)
- Platforms: PlayStation 2, Xbox 360, PlayStation 3, Wii, Microsoft Windows, Mac OS X, Arcade, Nintendo DS, Mobile phone, PlayStation 4, Wii U, Xbox One, iOS, Android, Blackberry OS, Windows Mobile, Windows Phone, N-Gage 2.0
- First release: Guitar Hero; November 8, 2005
- Latest release: Guitar Hero Live; October 20, 2015

Guitar Hero is a series of rhythm games first released in 2005, in which players use a guitar-shaped game controller to simulate playing primarily lead, bass, and rhythm guitar across numerous songs. Players match notes that scroll on-screen to colored fret buttons on the controller, strumming the controller in time to the music in order to score points, and keep the virtual audience excited. The games attempt to mimic many features of playing a real guitar, including the use of fast-fingering hammer-ons and pull-offs and the use of the whammy bar to alter the pitch of notes. Most games support single player modes, typically a Career mode to play through all the songs in the game, as well as competitive and cooperative multiplayer modes. With the introduction of Guitar Hero World Tour in 2008, the game includes support for a four-player band including vocals and drums. The series initially used mostly cover versions of songs created by WaveGroup Sound, but most recent titles feature soundtracks that are fully master recordings, and in some cases, special re-recordings, of the songs. Later titles in the series feature support for downloadable content in the form of new songs.

In 2005, RedOctane, a company specializing in the manufacture of unique game controllers, was inspired to create Guitar Hero based on its experience creating hardware for Konami's GuitarFreaks arcade game. It enlisted Harmonix, which had previously developed several music video games, for development assistance. The first game in the series was made on a budget of US$1 million. The series became extremely successful, leading to the acquisition of RedOctane by Activision in 2007. Harmonix was acquired by MTV Games and went on to create the Rock Band series of music games in the same vein as Guitar Hero. Activision brought Neversoft (primarily known for their Tony Hawk series of skateboarding games) on board for future development duties. Additional companies, such as Budcat Creations and Vicarious Visions, have assisted in the adaptation of the games for other systems.

The series has twenty-five releases, including the two spin-offs, the DJ Hero series and Band Hero. The Guitar Hero franchise was a primary brand during the emergence of the popularity of rhythm games as a cultural phenomenon in North America. Such games have been utilized as a learning and development tool for medical purposes. The first game in the series was considered by several journalists to be one of the most influential video games of the first decade of the 21st century. The series has sold more than 25 million units worldwide, earning US$2 billion at retail.

Despite early success, the series, along with the overall rhythm game genre, suffered from poor sales starting in 2009. Despite asserting consumer research suggested continued solid demand for the series, Activision later stated that the series was on hiatus for 2011, amid the development of a seventh main installment that was later cancelled as the emerging product was considered to be of poor quality. Activision later shut down sales of the series' downloadable content, although users who purchased material from it previously may still play what they bought.

Guitar Hero Live, released in October 2015, was the first new title in the series in five years, considered to be a reboot of the series and developed by FreeStyleGames, which had developed the DJ Hero games. Following a lukewarm reception and sales, Activision laid off many of the game's developers and sold the studio to Ubisoft, later shutting down the game's streaming DLC service.

== History ==
Guitar Hero release timeline Main series in bold
2005	**Guitar Hero**
2006	**Guitar Hero II**
2007	Guitar Hero Encore: Rocks the 80s
2007	**Guitar Hero III: Legends of Rock**
2008	Guitar Hero: On Tour
2008	Guitar Hero: Aerosmith
2008	**Guitar Hero World Tour**
2008	Guitar Hero On Tour: Decades
2009	Guitar Hero: Metallica
2009	Guitar Hero Smash Hits
2009	Guitar Hero On Tour: Modern Hits
2009	**Guitar Hero 5**
2009	DJ Hero
2009	Band Hero
2009	Guitar Hero: Van Halen
2010	**Guitar Hero: Warriors of Rock**
2010	DJ Hero 2
2011
2012
2013
2014
2015	**Guitar Hero Live**

=== Origins and development at Harmonix (2005–2006) ===
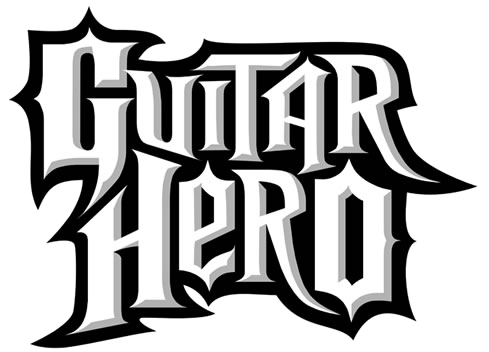
The original Guitar Hero logo features more pointed decorations on its letters, emphasizing its basis in heavy metal.

The new logo, which was introduced with Guitar Hero 5 and used up through Warriors of Rock, removes these sharp features so as to reflect the broader selection of music now included in the games.

Guitar Hero was created from a partnership between RedOctane, then their own company that produced specialized video game controllers, and Harmonix, a music video game development company who had previously produced Frequency, Amplitude, and Karaoke Revolution. RedOctane was seeking to bring in a GuitarFreaks-like game, highly popular in Japan at the time, into Western markets, and approached Harmonix about helping them to develop a music game involving a guitar controller. Both companies agreed to it, and went on to produce Guitar Hero in 2005. The title was highly successful, leading to the development of its successful sequel, Guitar Hero II, in 2006. While the original controllers for the first Guitar Hero game were designed by Ryan Lesser, Rob Kay, Greg LoPiccolo, and Alex Rigopulous of Harmonix and built by the Honeybee Corporation of China, subsequent iterations and future controllers were developed inhouse at RedOctane.

=== Sale to Activision and development by Neversoft (2006–2009) ===
Both RedOctane and Harmonix experienced changes in 2006. RedOctane was bought by Activision in June — who spent US$100 million to acquire the Guitar Hero franchise — while it was announced in October that Harmonix would be purchased by MTV Games. As a result of the two purchases, Harmonix would no longer develop future games in the Guitar Hero series. Instead, that responsibility would go to Neversoft, a subsidiary of Activision known for developing the Tony Hawk's series of skateboarding games. Neversoft was chosen to helm the Guitar Hero series after Neversoft founder, Joel Jewett, admitted to the RedOctane founders, Kai and Charles Huang, that his development team for Tony Hawk's Project 8 went to work on weekends just to play Guitar Hero. Activision CEO Bobby Kotick believed that Neversoft would help them bring great games to the series, but on reflection, stated that had Activision explored Harmonix further as a continued developer for the series, things "may have turned out differently". In addition, Activision began seeking other markets for the game; a Nintendo DS version of the series was developed by Vicarious Visions, while a Guitar Hero Mobile series was created for mobile phones. The company also began considering the expansion of the series to band-specific titles with Guitar Hero: Aerosmith. Later, in November 2008, Activision acquired Budcat Creations, another development studio that had helped with the PlayStation 2 versions of Guitar Hero III and World Tour, announcing that they would be helping to develop another game in the Guitar Hero series.

In 2007, Harmonix and MTV Games released a new music title through rival publisher Electronic Arts, called Rock Band. It expanded upon the gameplay popularized by the Guitar Hero series by adding drum and microphone instruments, allowing players to simulate playing songs as bands. Activision followed suit with the release of Guitar Hero World Tour in 2008, which supported multiple instruments. In 2009, Activision tripled its Guitar Hero offerings, and in addition to further continuation of the existing main series with Guitar Hero 5 and expansions, they introduced the titles Band Hero, geared towards more family-friendly pop music, and DJ Hero, a game based on turntablism and featuring a number of mixes. With the release of Guitar Hero 5, Activision considered the series to have moved away from its heavy metal basis into a broader selection of music. Guitar Hero 5 is the first game in the series to use a new version of the series' logo; previous games used a logo in a font with sharper "points" on the letters, which was considered "idiosyncratic with a vengeance" to match the games' emphasis on heavy metal music. Activision used the services of the Pentagram design studio to refashion the game's logo. Pentagram developed a new font, removing some of the "aggressive odd" features to make the typeface more suitable and amendable to design feature incorporation to other games such as Band Hero and DJ Hero.

=== Decline and hiatus (2009–2015) ===
The results of the expanded offerings did not contribute well to the series, alongside the late-2000s recession; sales of most rhythm games including Guitar Hero and DJ Hero did not meet expectations, falling about 50% short of projected targets. Activision announced it would be cutting back to only 10 SKUs within 2010 instead of the 25 in 2009. Though RedOctane and Neversoft continued to develop the 6th main game, Guitar Hero: Warriors of Rock, until its completion, both studios were later shuttered by Activision, moving key personnel into Activision directly for future game development, and in the case of Neversoft, closing its Guitar Hero division, while transferring future development duties for the series to Vicarious Visions, another Activision studio which had been fundamental in building the Wii and Nintendo DS versions of the games. In November 2010, Activision also closed Budcat Creations, the arm of the publisher that was primarily responsible for porting the Guitar Hero games to the PlayStation 2.

Ahead of Activision's 2010 fourth quarter financial report in February 2011, Activision disbanded its Guitar Hero business unit and announced that it would cease development of the planned 2011 Guitar Hero game. Activision cited "continued declines in the music genre" to explain its decision. The closure also affected the DJ Hero series, as Activision stated that there were no plans to publish a music game during 2011. Activision's vice president Dan Winters later clarified that the company was "just putting Guitar Hero on hiatus" and that they were "just not making a new game for next year, that's all".

In a July 2011 interview with Forbes, Kotick stated that while the publisher was "going to stop selling Guitar Hero altogether", they were "going to go back to the studios and we're going to use new studios and reinvent" the series, but a former team member of Vicarious Visions stated that as of 2012, all development of Guitar Hero had come to an end within Activision. Another source close to Vicarious Visions had reported to Kotaku that while Guitar Hero 7 was in development under an Activision studio, the game was considered a "disaster". The cancelled game omitted the additional instruments and used only a guitar peripheral, redesigning the unit to include a 6-button mechanism replacing the strum bar; the resulting unit was considered too expensive to manufacture and purchase. The developers had also started the game development from scratch to try to create new characters and venues that would be more reactive to the actual songs being played to give the feel of a music video, but ultimately this proved too much of a challenge and had to be scrapped. Further, with a limited budget, the song selection was limited to "low-budget" hits of the 1990s, or at times reusing songs that had previously been included in Guitar Hero games. Though the team had a two-year development cycle, it was closed down after Activision president Eric Hirshber had seen the current state of the project at the one-year point.

Another potential Guitar Hero project was discovered by the archival site Unseen64 for a game titled Hero World, a massively multiplayer online game that would link the Guitar Hero and DJ Hero games. The game had been developed by FreeStyleGames, sometime after the release of DJ Hero 2, with the main development duties passed to Virtual Fairground, using their platform The Ride, an Adobe Flash-based platform that would let the game be played in a web browser. The game was cancelled in 2011 along with other pending Guitar Hero projects.

No further downloadable content for either Guitar Hero or DJ Hero was made after February 2011, though Activision committed to releasing content that was already in development by that time due to fan response; later, in a move described by Game Informer as "the final nail in [the series'] coffins", Activision announced it would discontinue all DLC sales for the series without revoking access to tracks already bought as of March 31, 2014. Though Activision had moved away from the Guitar Hero series, the lessons learned helped them and developer Toys for Bob to handle the manufacturing and outsourcing issues that came with the highly successful Skylanders toy and video game franchise.

=== Guitar Hero Live and second hiatus (2015–present) ===
In April 2015, Activision announced a new entry in the series, titled Guitar Hero Live. The title was developed by Activision's internal studio FreeStyleGames, who previously had worked on the DJ Hero spinoff titles. FreeStyleGames were given free rein to reboot the Guitar Hero series for next-generation consoles. One of their first innovations was to drop the standard five-button guitar controller, ultimately designing a six-button guitar controller, with two rows of three buttons each, allowing them to mimic actual guitar fingering. Guitar Hero Live was released with both a career and an online mode. The career mode used full-motion video taken from the perspective of a lead guitarist underneath the note highway, to create an immersive experience to the player. The online mode, called GHTV, discarded the previous downloadable content approach and used a music video channel approach to stream playable songs to players, adding new songs to the catalog on a weekly basis. The game was released in October 2015.

Though the game was praised as a reinvention of the Guitar Hero series, the game did not sell as well as Activision expected; due to lowered forecasts, Activision let go of about half of FreeStyleGames' developers. In January 2017, Ubisoft acquired FreeStyleGames from Activision, with unclear consequences for the game. Activision shut down GHTV on December 1, 2018, reducing the available songs from almost 500 to the 42 present on-disc.

In 2020 online servers for all Guitar Hero games were shut down on PS3. Between this and the closure of Wii online servers for all games, they are now only playable online on Xbox 360.

== Games ==
=== Main titles ===
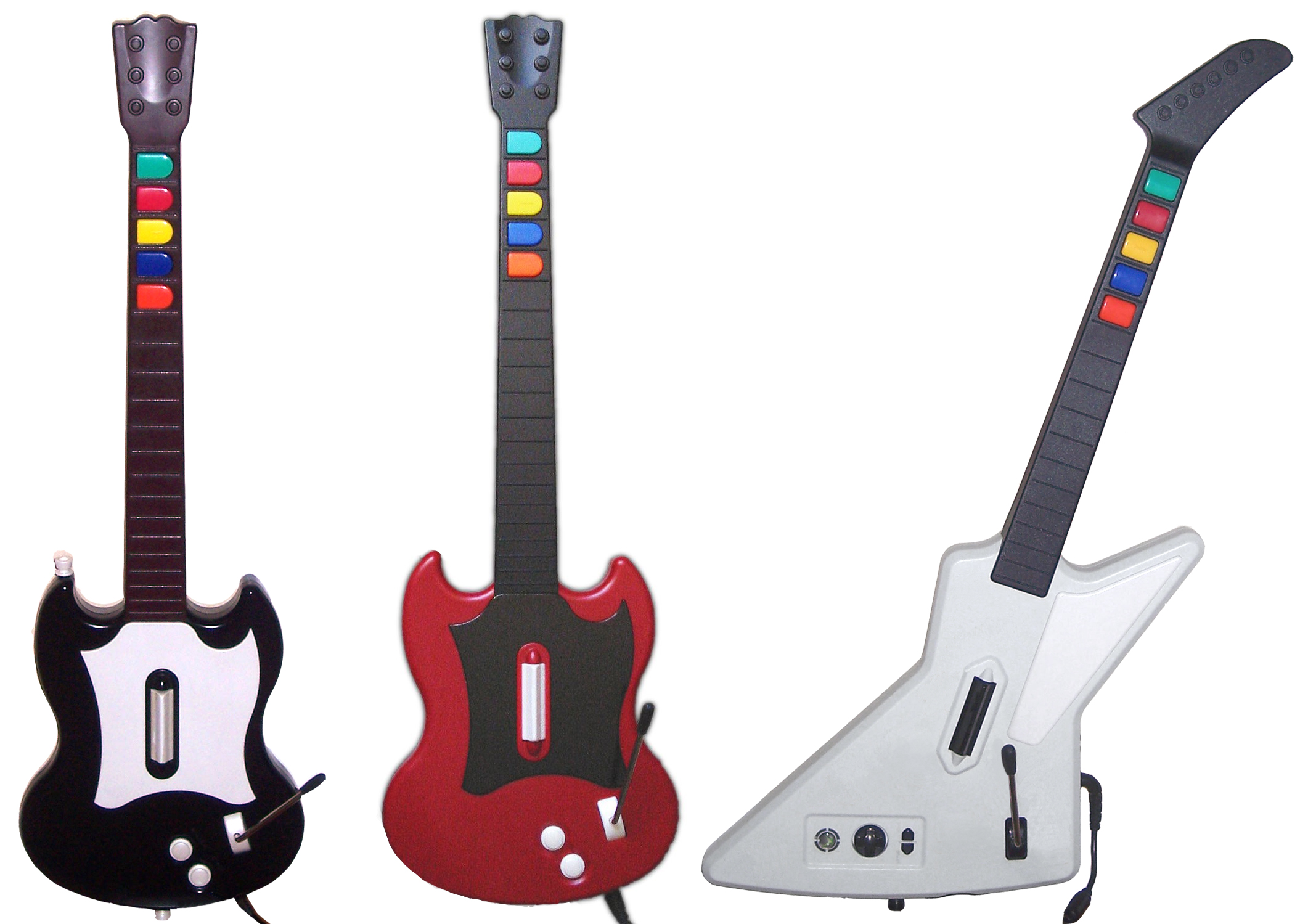
The controllers bundled with Guitar Hero releases (from left to right): Gibson SGs for Guitar Hero and Guitar Hero II (PlayStation 2) and Gibson Explorer for Guitar Hero II (Xbox 360) and Guitar Hero III: Legends of Rock (PC)

The original Guitar Hero was released on the PlayStation 2 in November 2005. Guitar Hero is notable because it comes packaged with a controller peripheral modeled after a black Gibson SG guitar. Rather than a typical gamepad, this guitar controller is the primary input for the game. Playing the game with the guitar controller simulates playing an actual guitar, except it uses five colored "fret buttons" and a "strum bar" instead of frets and strings. The development of Guitar Hero was inspired by Konami's GuitarFreaks video game, which at the time, had not seen much exposure in the North American market; RedOctane, already selling guitar-shaped controllers for imported copies of GuitarFreaks, approached Harmonix about creating a game to use an entirely new Guitar controller. The concept was to have the gameplay of Amplitude with the visuals of Karaoke Revolution, both of which had been developed by Harmonix. The game was met with critical acclaim and received numerous awards for its innovative guitar peripheral and its soundtrack, which comprised 47 playable rock songs (most of which were cover versions of popular songs from artists and bands from the 1960s through modern rock). Guitar Hero has sold nearly 1.5 million copies to date.

The popularity of the series increased dramatically with the release of Guitar Hero II for the PlayStation 2 in 2006. Featuring improved multiplayer gameplay, an improved note-recognizing system, and 64 songs, it became the fifth best-selling video game of 2006. The PlayStation 2 version of the game was offered both separately and in a bundle with a cherry red Gibson SG guitar controller. Guitar Hero II was later released for the Xbox 360 in April 2007 with an exclusive Gibson Explorer guitar controller and an additional 10 songs, among other features. About 3 million units of Guitar Hero II have sold on the PlayStation 2 and Xbox 360.

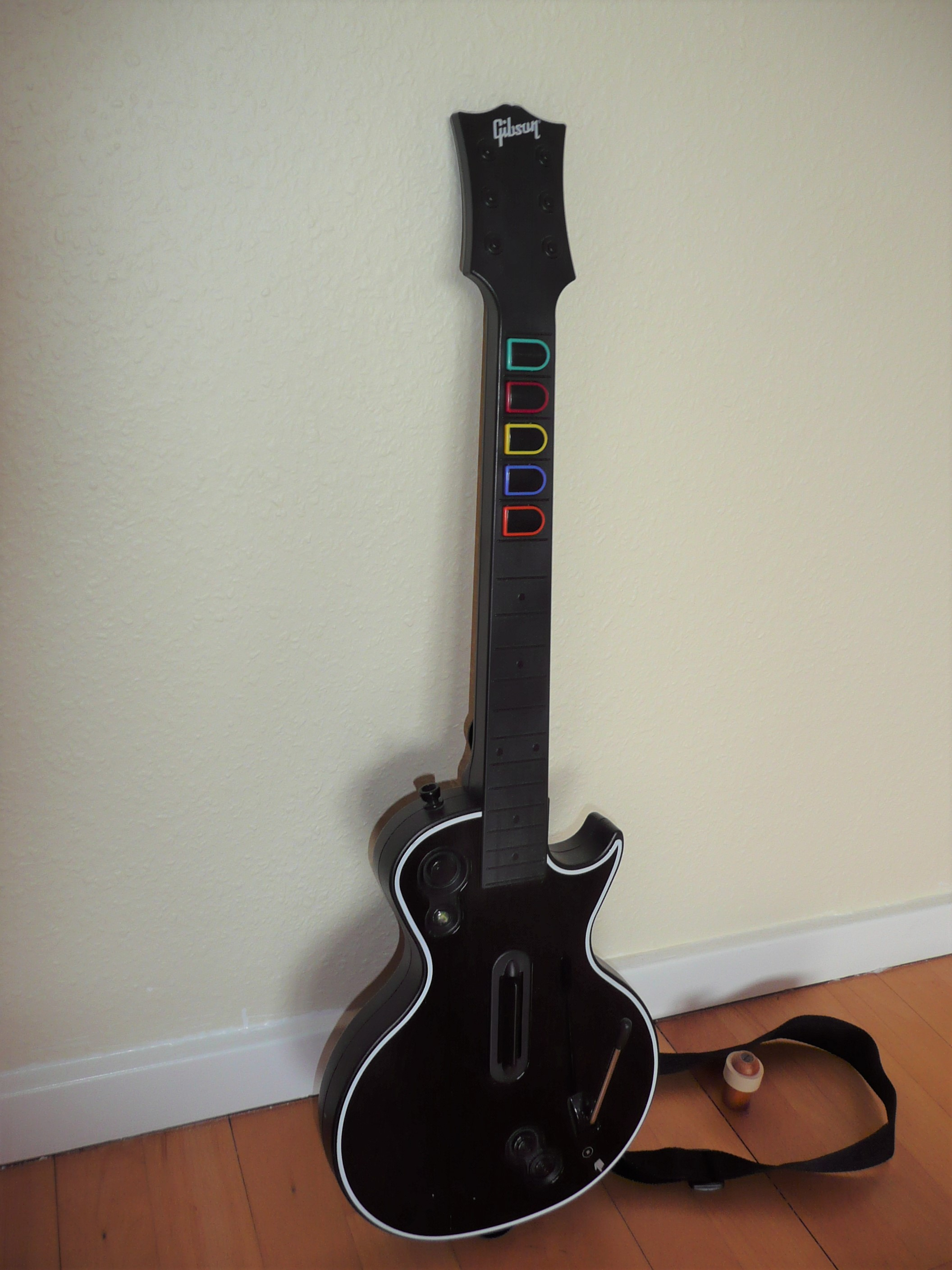
The Gibson Les Paul Guitar controller bundled with Xbox 360 and PlayStation 3 releases of Guitar Hero III: Legends of Rock (pictured is the Xbox 360 guitar controller). A similar white Gibson Les Paul guitar controller is bundled with the Wii release, which requires the Wii Remote to be inserted in the back. For in-store demos on the Xbox 360, a wired Les Paul controller is used.

Guitar Hero III: Legends of Rock was released in late 2007 for the PlayStation 2, PlayStation 3, Xbox 360, Wii, Microsoft Windows, and Mac OS X platforms. The title is the first installment of the series to include wireless guitars bundled with the game and also the first to release a special bundle with two guitars. The game includes Slash and Tom Morello as playable characters in addition to the existing fictional avatars; both guitarists performed motion capture to be used for their characters' animation in the game. The game opened to critically acclaimed reviews from critics and fans alike, with most calling it the greatest entry in the series. As PGNx Media stated on Metacritic, "Guitar Hero III: Legends of Rock is undoubtedly the best game in the series." The game later became one of the best selling video games of all time and the first ever game to reach 1 billion dollars in sales.

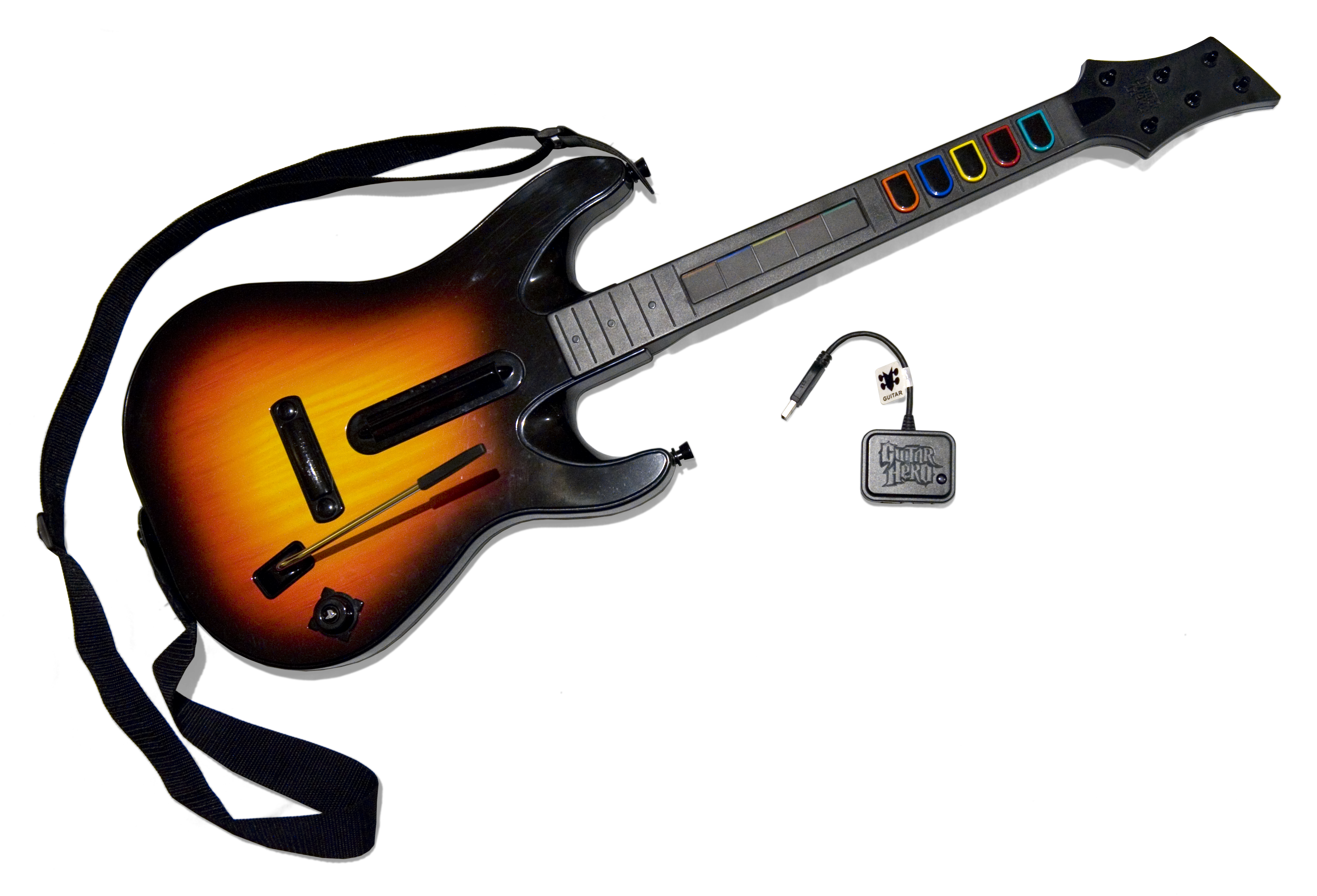
The "Genericaster" guitar controller bundled with Guitar Hero World Tour (pictured is the PlayStation 3 guitar controller). Unlike previous Guitar Hero controllers, this controller is not based on a real guitar.

Guitar Hero World Tour, previously named Guitar Hero IV, is the fourth full game in the series and was released on October 26, 2008 for PlayStation 2, PlayStation 3, Xbox 360, and Wii. Analysts had expected that future Guitar Hero games in 2008 would include additional instrument peripherals to compete against Rock Band; Guitar Hero World Tour was confirmed as in development following the announcement of the merger between Activision and Vivendi Games in December 2007. Activision's CEO Bobby Kotick announced on April 21, 2008 that Guitar Hero World Tour will branch out into other instruments including vocals. Guitar Hero World Tour includes drums and vocals, and can be bought packaged with a new drum set controller, a microphone, and the standard guitar controller. A larger number of real-world musicians appear as playable characters, including Jimi Hendrix, Billy Corgan, Hayley Williams, Zakk Wylde, Ted Nugent, Travis Barker, Sting, and Ozzy Osbourne. Guitar Hero World Tour also features custom song creation that can be shared with others.

Guitar Hero 5, the fifth main entry in the series, was confirmed in December 2008. It was released on September 1, 2009, and includes 85 songs from 83 different artists. The game includes new game modes and features, including its 'Party Mode,' which gives players the ability to drop-in and out and change difficulties in the middle of a song. Artists including Johnny Cash, Matt Bellamy, Carlos Santana, Kurt Cobain and Shirley Manson appear as playable characters in the game.

Guitar Hero: Warriors of Rock, the sixth main console game in the series, was released on September 28, 2010. It is the last game in the series developed by Neversoft's Guitar Hero division prior to its dissolution, with Vicarious Visions assisting on the Wii version with added Nintendo DS functionality. The game has been described as returning to the roots of the Guitar Hero series; while it still allows for full band play, the soundtrack's focus is on rock and roll music and an emphasis on guitar "shredding". The game introduced a career-based "Quest Mode", narrated by Gene Simmons, that guides the players to complete songs to unlock "warriors of rock" to join them in saving "demigod of rock" and his guitar from his imprisonment by "the Beast".

Following a five-year hiatus, as described below, Activision announced Guitar Hero Live for release in late 2015 on most seventh-generation and eighth-generation consoles. Live was developed to rebuild the game from the ground up, and while the gameplay remains similar to the earlier titles, focusing primarily on the lead guitar, it uses a 3-button guitar controller with each button having "up" and "down" positions, making for more complex tabulators. The game uses live footage of a rock concert, taken from the perspective of the lead guitarist, to provide a more immersive experience.

=== Series expansions ===
Guitar Hero Encore: Rocks the 80s for the PlayStation 2, which was released in July 2007, was the final game Harmonix developed for the series. Though it was produced after Harmonix was purchased by MTV Games, they were contractually obligated to finish the game, which as suggested by its name primarily features songs from the 1980s. The game was criticized for its small selection of songs, and in one case compared unfavorably to Lou Reed's album Metal Machine Music for allegedly being a mere contractual obligation project.

Guitar Hero: Aerosmith was the first Guitar Hero game to center on one specific artist. On September 4, 2007, Billboard announced that Aerosmith was "working closely with the makers of Guitar Hero IV", which would be "dedicated to the group's music". On February 15, 2008, Activision announced that Guitar Hero: Aerosmith would be released on June 29, 2008. Guitar Hero: Aerosmith was developed by Neversoft for the Xbox 360 and PlayStation 3 versions, by Vicarious Visions for the Wii, and by Budcat Creations for the PlayStation 2. The game's setlist is mostly Aerosmith songs, with other songs from Joe Perry's solo work or artists that have inspired or performed with Aerosmith, including Run-DMC.

Guitar Hero: Metallica, the next entry in the series to center on one artist, was released on March 29, 2009. It is based on the full band experience of World Tour, and educates players on Metallica's history and music in the same manner as Guitar Hero: Aerosmith did for Aerosmith. The game also debuted a new difficulty for drums, called Expert+ (read "expert-plus"), intended to incorporate a second bass drum pedal for songs that would otherwise be too difficult to play on drums. The game received generally well reviews with fans praising the song selection and the heavily enforced Metallica theme.

Guitar Hero Smash Hits (titled Guitar Hero Greatest Hits in Europe and Australia) was released in June 2009. It features full-band versions of 48 songs from earlier Guitar Hero games that only used the guitar controller. Unlike the previous versions, each of the songs is based on a master recording that includes some live tracks. The game follows a similar model as Guitar Hero: Metallica, and was developed Beenox for the PlayStation 3, Xbox 360, PlayStation 2, and Wii. It received a lukewarm reception with many calling it unnecessary and a "cash grab."

DJ Hero was announced by Activision in May 2009. Prior to the announcement, the company had purchased FreeStyleGames, a small developer of music games, to help produce localized downloadable content for Guitar Hero games and a then-unannounced music game, later revealed to be DJ Hero. DJ Hero uses a special turntable-based controller for players to perform with on various song mixes in the game. The game also incorporates the use of a Guitar Hero controller on ten specially arranged tracks; Bright suggested that future Guitar Hero games after Guitar Hero 5 could include the use of the turntable control.

Band Hero was announced in May 2009 and features "Top 40" hits aimed at family audiences, using the full band play style of Guitar Hero 5. The game was also developed for the Nintendo DS, using the Guitar Hero: On Tour Guitar Grip, a new "drum skin" to fit the DS Lite, and the DS's microphone to support the full band experience. Musician Taylor Swift appears as a playable character in the game, as do the members of No Doubt.

Guitar Hero: Van Halen was released on December 22, 2009, though customers that purchased Guitar Hero 5 under a special promotion received a copy of the game early. Like the other games oriented around a specific artist, Guitar Hero: Van Halen mainly uses songs by the band Van Halen, including three guitar solos by Eddie Van Halen, in addition to guest acts such as Queen, Weezer, Blink-182, Foo Fighters, The Offspring, and Queens of the Stone Age.

A sequel to DJ Hero, DJ Hero 2, was officially announced in June 2010 for release in the last quarter of 2010, featuring more than 70 mashups from over 85 artists. The game includes several new gameplay modes, including an "Empire" career mode, head-to-head DJ battles, social multiplayer modes, and a jump-in and out Party Play mode similar to Guitar Hero 5. The game also includes more vocal options for singing and rapping to songs, and a freestyle mode for players.

=== Portable versions ===
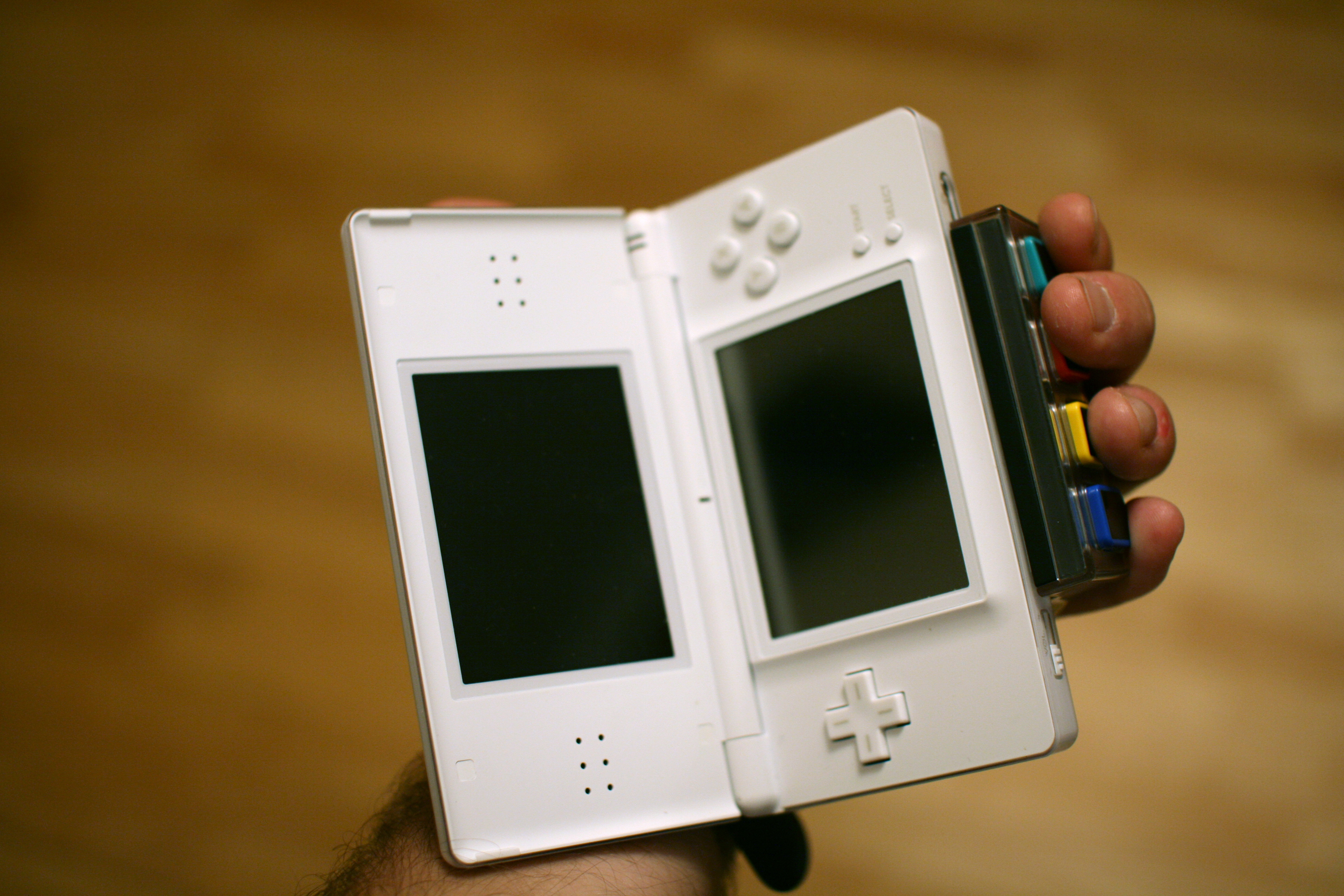
The "Guitar Grip", developed by Vicarious Visions for the Nintendo DS series Guitar Hero: On Tour provides four fret buttons for the game, while strumming is done on the DS touchscreen by use of a pick-shaped stylus.

Guitar Hero: On Tour was released on the Nintendo DS hand-held system on June 22, 2008. The game includes a peripheral, dubbed the "Guitar Grip", a rectangular device that fits into the second slot of the Nintendo DS or DS Lite. The peripheral only features the first four fret buttons and a strap so the Nintendo DS can be held sideways comfortably for play. The game also includes a guitar pick shaped stylus for use with strumming in the game, which players move across the touchscreen. Guitar Hero: On Tour was developed by Vicarious Visions, who also ported the Guitar Hero games to Nintendo's Wii console.

A sequel, Guitar Hero On Tour: Decades, was released in November 2008, featuring music spanning four decades. A third title in the series, Guitar Hero On Tour: Modern Hits, was announced following various rumors of its existence, and was released in June 2009, featuring songs recorded since the year 2000. Both games use the "Guitar Grip" controller, and allow two players to compete against each other using any version of the On Tour series, with songs being shared between versions.

Band Hero was also ported to the Nintendo DS by Vicarious Visions, expanding the play to include vocals (through the DS microphone) and drumming. The drumming uses a special "drum skin" adapter designed for the Nintendo DS Lite to map the unit's face buttons to four drum pads. However, the peripheral is not compatible with the original Nintendo DS model or the Nintendo DSi. However, since the drum skin is not electronic but a rubber cover switch that duplicates certain buttons on the DS Lite, a player can simply press the buttons in time to play the drums. The game includes four-player local wireless play in a similar manner as Guitar Hero 5 allowing any combination of instruments to be used. The game has a set of 30 songs; some are from Band Hero and others are from several Guitar Hero games' set lists.

Guitar Hero: On Tour does not work on the Nintendo DSi and Nintendo 3DS because unlike the Nintendo DS, they do not have Game Boy Advance slots. Band Hero is limited to vocals and drums on the two consoles for the same reason.

=== Mobile phone versions ===
Guitar Hero III Mobile was released for mobile phones in 2007 and 2008, and was developed by MachineWorks Northwest LLC. The base version of the game includes 15 songs from both Guitar Hero II and Guitar Hero III, and has released a three-song add-on pack every month since January 2008. The title has been downloaded by users one million times, with both Verizon and Hands-On Mobile claiming that over 250,000 songs are played a day on the platform. The two companies produced two other mobile-based Guitar Hero games; Guitar Hero III: Backstage Pass, released in July 2008, adds role-playing elements to manage the band's success in addition to the core rhythm game, while the mobile version of Guitar Hero World Tour, released in December 2008, expands each included track for play on both lead guitar and drums, mimicking the expansion of the console series to the full band.

Glu Mobile developed the mobile version of Guitar Hero 5, released in the last quarter of 2009.

=== Other games ===
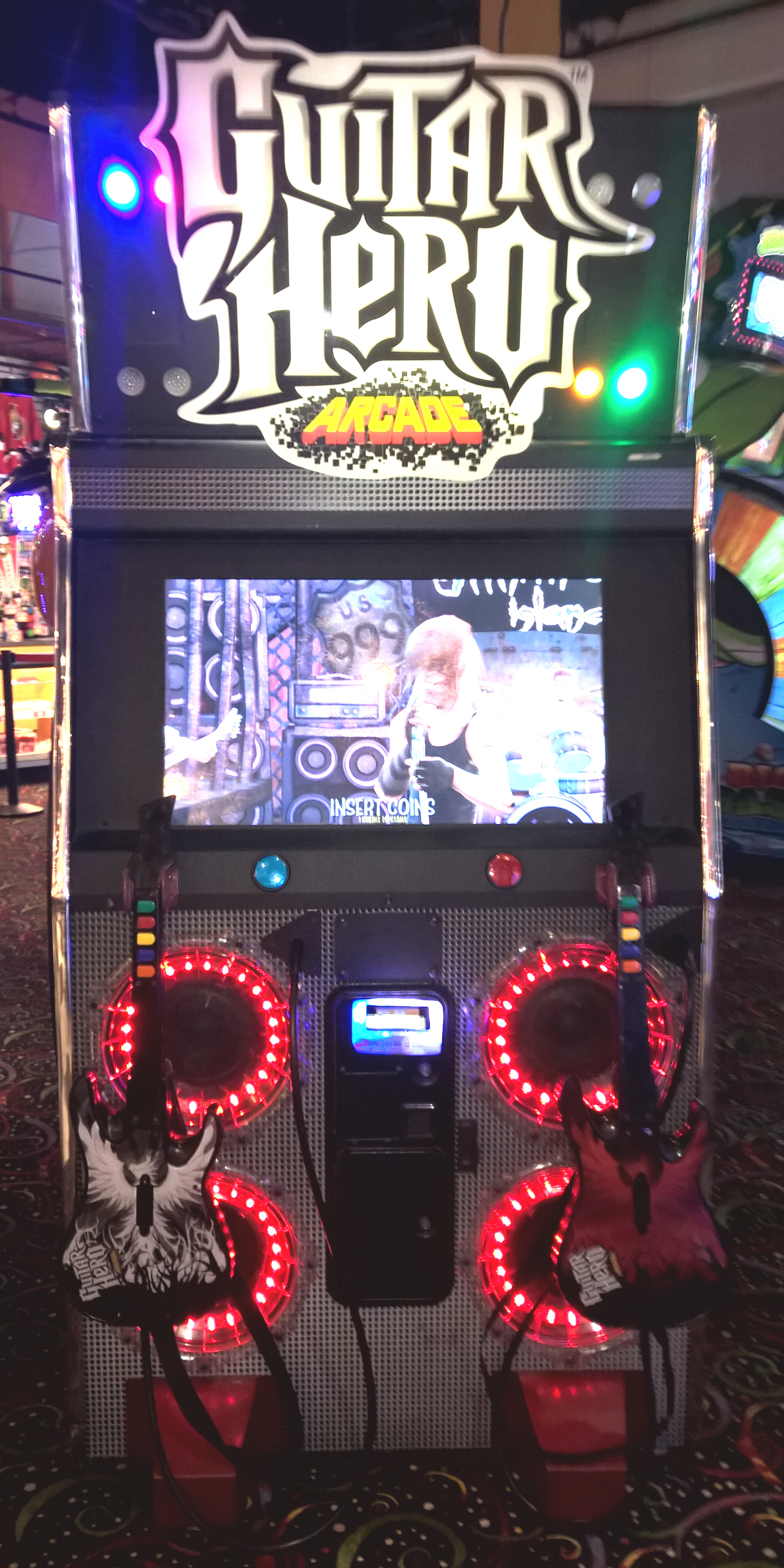
Guitar Hero Arcade

Activision and RedOctane also worked with Basic Fun, Inc. to produce Guitar Hero Carabiner, a handheld electronic game that features excerpts of several songs taken from the first two games.

Activision and Konami, who had previously worked together to make sure that the Guitar Hero series meets with Konami's patents on music games, in conjunction with Raw Thrills, developed an arcade console version of the game, titled Guitar Hero Arcade, distributed to arcades in early 2009. The game is completely based on the Guitar Hero III gameplay, but reducing some of the features such as the use of the Whammy bar, Star Power Button (Star Power may only be activated by lifting the Guitar) and Practice Modes, but keeping the ability to download new songs for the cabinet from the Internet. The arcade game has come under some scrutiny by the American Society of Composers, Authors and Publishers (ASCAP), who believe the use of the game in arcades is equivalent to "public performances" and seek additional fees to be paid by operators of the game.

=== Planned games ===
The double release of Guitar Hero 5 and Band Hero in 2009 were the last of the series' games to be released on PlayStation 2. It was expected that the 2010 entry for Guitar Hero, Warriors of Rock, would be the final entry developed by Neversoft, based on claims that Neversoft would be letting go of its Guitar Hero division, with Vicarious Visions likely poised to take over future development. Further industry rumors pointed at the closure of RedOctane Studios and Underground Development (the development studio for Guitar Hero: Van Halen) as further results from the scaling-back; Activision moved the controller hardware development within their own division to continue to support the series, with RedOctane founders Kai and Charles Huang remaining with Activision. A week prior to these announcements, the Guitar Hero division CEO at Activision, Dan Rosensweig, left the company, leading to some speculation on whether Rosensweig's departure influenced these changes. Activision and RedOctane had trademarked the titles "Guitar Villain", "Drum Villain", "Keyboard Hero" and "Sing Hero". RedOctane originally trademarked the titles "Drum Hero" and "Band Hero", but the work performed towards the Drum Hero title was eventually folded into the gameplay for Guitar Hero World Tour, and Band Hero became its own game. Later, as of October 2009, Activision reapplied for a Drum Hero trademark. Pi Studios, which had previously helped to port Rock Band to the Wii, had started work on the karaoke title Sing Hero before Activision cancelled its development. Dance Hero was also said to have been in development as of 2011.

Dave Mustaine, frontman for Megadeth, stated he had been in talks with Activision and Neversoft for a Guitar Hero-related product. It was later revealed that Mustaine was working with Activision for music in Guitar Hero: Warriors of Rock, including an original track ("Sudden Death") recorded specifically for the game.

Two Guitar Hero products that were announced but never released were a Red Hot Chili Peppers-themed title and a PlayStation Portable title that would have featured a drum component.

== Gameplay ==
Gameplay of a single player playing Pantera's "Cowboys From Hell". The player in Guitar Hero must play the colored notes on the fret board in time with the music as they scroll through the target at the bottom. The score and current score multiplier are shown on the bottom left. The Rock Meter dial and Star Power indicator are shown on the bottom right. The remainder of the screen shows the player's character and band as they perform to the music.

The core gameplay of the Guitar Hero games is a rhythm video game similar to Konami's GuitarFreaks and to a lesser extent Harmonix's previous music games such as Frequency and Amplitude. The guitar controller is recommended for play, although a standard console controller can be used instead. However, the guitar controller has been required for play ever since the inclusion of drum and vocal parts in the series. The game supports toggling the handedness of the guitar, allowing both left-handed and right-handed players to utilize the guitar controller.

While playing the game, an extended guitar neck is shown vertically on the screen (the frets horizontal), often called the "note highway", and as the song progresses, colored markers or "gems" indicating notes travel down the screen in time with the music; the note colors and positions match those of the five fret keys on the guitar controller. Once the note(s) reach the bottom, the player must play the indicated note(s) by holding down the correct fret button(s) and hitting the strumming bar in order to score points. Success or failure will cause the on-screen Rock Meter to change, gauging the current health of the performance (denoted by red, yellow, and green sections). Should the Rock Meter drop below the red section, the song will automatically end, with the player booed off the stage by the audience. Successful note hits will add to the player's score, and by hitting a long series of consecutive successful note hits, the player can increase their score multiplier. There is a window of time for hitting each note, similar to other rhythm games such as Dance Dance Revolution, but unlike these games, scoring in Guitar Hero is not affected by accuracy; as long as the note is hit within that window, the player receives the same number of points.

Selected special segments of the song will have glowing notes outlined by stars: successfully hitting all notes in this series will fill the "Star Power Meter". The Star Power Meter can also be filled by using the whammy bar during sustained notes within these segments. Once the Star Power Meter is at least half full, the player can activate "Star Power" by pressing the select button or momentarily lifting the guitar into a vertical position. When Star Power is activated, the scoring multiplier is doubled until Star Power is depleted. The Rock Meter also increases more dramatically when Star Power is activated, making it easier for the player to make the Rock Meter stay at a high level. Thus, Star Power can be used strategically to play difficult sections of a song that otherwise might cause the player to fail. In the earlier entries of the series (up until Guitar Hero: Aerosmith), activating Star Power meant that players could not accrue more Star Power until the Star Power meter was fully drained and the effect ended. Starting with Guitar Hero: World Tour, more Star Power can be collected even if the effect is active by completing more Star Power phrases, extending the Star Power's duration by doing so. When playing in cooperative play (with a bassist/rhythm guitarist in Guitar Hero II through Guitar Hero: Aerosmith or as a band in Guitar Hero: World Tour), Star Power is shared between all the players and activation of Star Power is dependent on all players simultaneously activating it.

Notes can be a single note, or composed of two to five notes that make a chord. Both single notes and chords can also be sustained, indicated by a colored line following the note marker; the player can hold the sustained note(s) keys down for the entire length for additional points. During a sustained note, a player may use the whammy bar on the guitar to alter the tone of the note. Also, regardless of whether sustains are hit early or late, if the fret is held for the full duration of the hold, the game will always award the same amount of score increase for the note. In addition, the games support virtual implementations of "hammer-ons" and "pull-offs", guitar-playing techniques that are used to successfully play a fast series of notes by only changing the fingering on the fret buttons without having to strum each note. Sequences where strumming is not required are indicated on-screen by notes with a white outline at the top of the marker instead of the usual black one, with Guitar Hero III: Legends of Rock adding a white-glowing effect to make these notes clearer. Guitar Hero World Tour features transparent notes that are connected by a purple outline; players may either simply tap the correct fret for these notes without strumming or utilize a touchpad on World Tour's guitar controller to mimic the slide technique. In addition, notes can now be played while a sustained note is being played. World Tour also adds an open string note for bass players, represented by a line across the fret instead of any note gems, that is played by strumming without holding down any fret buttons (the sixth installment, Warriors of Rock, features an open note sustain for bass instruments as well).

Gameplay of a whole band in Guitar Hero World Tour playing Billy Idol's "Rebel Yell". On top are vocals, bottom from left to right: lead guitar, drums and bass guitar.

Guitar Hero World Tour introduced drums and vocal tracks in addition to lead and bass guitar. Drum tracks are played similar to guitar tracks; the player must strike the appropriate drum head or step down on the bass drum pedal on the controller when the note gems pass the indicated line. Certain note gems, when using a drum controller that is velocity-sensitive, are "armored", requiring the player to hit the indicated drum pad harder to score more points. Vocal tracks are played similar to games such as Karaoke Revolution where the player must match the pitch and the pacing of the lyrics to score points. Guitar Hero 5 allows players to create a band of up to four players using any combination of instruments.

While the song is playing, the background visuals feature the players' chosen avatar, along with the rest of the band performing in one of several real and fictional venues. The reaction of the audience is based on the performance of the player judged by the Rock Meter. Guitar Hero II added special lighting and other stage effects that were synchronized to the music to provide a more complete concert experience. The games developed by Neversoft feature a simple storyline, usually about a band's quest for fame, which is told through animations played throughout the game. These animations were created by Chris Prynoski and his studio, Titmouse, Inc., who have also done animations for the animated show Metalocalypse.

=== Game modes ===
In Guitar Hero III's two-player "Battle Mode", each player attempts to interfere with their opponent's performance using special power-ups while avoiding being distracted by those thrown by the opponent.

The main mode of play in the Guitar Hero games is Career Mode, where the player and in-game band travel between various fictional performance arenas and perform sets of four to six songs. It is by completing songs in this mode that the songs are unlocked for play across the rest of the game. Players can choose their on-stage character, their guitar of choice, and the venue in which they wish to play. In this mode, the player can earn money from his/her performances that is redeemable at the in-game store, where bonus songs, additional guitars and finishes, your characters clothing and bonus content can be unlocked. Quick Play mode is a quicker method of playing songs, as it allows the player to select a track and difficulty, selecting the character, venue, and guitar and guitar skin for the player based on the song chosen. After successfully completing a song, the player is given a score, a percentage of how many notes they hit and a rating from three to five stars, and two in rare cases depending on his/her final score on the song, with money being awarded in Guitar Hero World Tour.

The games have also added multiplayer modes. Cooperative modes allow two players to play lead and either bass or rhythm guitar on the same song, working together towards the same score. A competitive Face-Off mode allows two players to play against each other at different difficulty levels, each attempting to earn the best score on a song. Each player plays different portions of the song. There is also a Pro Face-Off mode, where two players battle at the same difficulty level. Unlike standard Face-off, each player attempts to play all of the notes in a song, while still trying to earn the highest score. In Guitar Hero World Tour this was advanced on, as players could play a Pro Face-Off game against each other on any difficulty level, the lower your difficulty, the more points were awarded so a player on a low difficulty could potentially beat a player on a more challenging difficulty. Guitar Hero III introduced Boss Battles, in which two players face off against each other, attempt to collect "distractions" to throw at their opponent, trying to make them fail. With Guitar Hero World Tour, up to four players can play cooperatively on lead and bass guitar, drums, and vocals, while a total of eight players can compete in a Battle of the Bands. The Xbox 360, PlayStation 3, and Wii versions of the games support multiplayer modes over their respective network services.

The four difficulty levels for each song afford the player a learning curve in order to help him/her progress in skill. The first difficulty level, Easy, only focuses on the first three fret buttons while displaying a significantly reduced number of notes for the player to play. Medium introduces the fourth (blue) fret button, and Hard includes the final fret button while adding additional notes. The addition of the orange fret button forces players to move their fingers up and down the neck. Expert does not introduce any other frets to learn, but adds more notes in a manner designed to challenge the player and to simulate the player's hands to move in a sequence similar to a real guitar. A difficulty added in World Tour is Beginner, which only requires the player to strum to the basic rhythm; holding the fret buttons becomes unnecessary. Another new difficulty only for drums was added to Metallica known as Expert+, which uses the double bass pedal.

Guitar Hero: Warriors of Rock is the sixth installment in the franchise and introduced a new take on the Career mode of previous games. Rather than being a quest for fame and glory with the band travelling through different venues, Warriors of Rock features the "Quest Mode" as the primary campaign mode. Quest Mode tells the story of an ancient warrior who was defeated by a powerful monster and his mystical guitar was lost. The player must amass a team of rockers to help recover this guitar and defeat the monster (called "The Beast"). As the player progresses through the mode, the rockers joining them will transform based on the number of stars earned from songs played. These transformations will empower the player with extra abilities in a song such as constant score multipliers or Star Power bonuses. These abilities are each unique to the individual rockers and by using them effectively, it is possible now to earn up to forty stars for a single song.

=== Characters and customization ===
When playing through Career mode or in other parts of the Guitar Hero games, the player has the option to select one of several pre-created avatar characters, who will be shown performing on stage as the player attempts a song, but otherwise has no effect on the gameplay. A certain number of characters are available at the start of the game, but the player must spend in-game money earned by successful performances to unlock other characters. Many of the characters reappear throughout the series, with the character roster changing as new characters are added or removed. Standby characters that have appeared in nearly all the games include the metalhead Axel Steel, extreme/Viking/thrash metalhead Lars Ümlaut, punk rocker Johnny Napalm, gothic rocker Pandora, alternative rocker Judy Nails, and hard rocker Casey Lynch. The developers utilized these characters in more detail within Warriors of Rock, where each was given a unique setlist and venue based on their musical style, as well as a unique power within the game's Quest mode.

Several games in the series feature caricatures of celebrity artists, such as Slash, Tom Morello and Bret Michaels in Guitar Hero III, Ozzy Osbourne, Ted Nugent and Jimi Hendrix in World Tour, Kurt Cobain in Guitar Hero 5, and Taylor Swift and the band No Doubt in Band Hero. The band-specific games, Aerosmith, Metallica, and Van Halen also feature the members of the respective bands. However, in late 2009, both Courtney Love and the members of No Doubt sought legal action against Activision for the misuse of their in-game characters singing or performing songs by other artists, which the musicians believe fell outside of their contract.

The ability for the players to create their own avatars was added in Guitar Hero World Tour, and was based on Neversoft's existing character creation tools from the Tony Hawk series. Later games on the Xbox 360 and Wii allowed players to use the respective console's avatars as members of the band. In addition to unlocking characters, in-game money can be used to buy clothing, accessories and instruments that they are seen playing with. The guitars can also be customized with special finishes purchasable through the in-game store. Guitar Hero World Tour includes the ability to fully customize any component of the guitar. The in-game store in the series is also used to unlock bonus songs or special videos with interviews about the game or with the artists involved.

=== Soundtracks ===
Most of the games in the Guitar Hero series feature a selection of songs ranging from the 1960s to present day rock music from both highly successful artists and bands and independent groups. Guitar Hero Encore: Rocks the 80s features songs primarily from the 1980s, while Guitar Hero: Aerosmith, Metallica, and Van Halen feature music from the respective bands and groups that inspired or worked with the bands. Songs with profanities have been censored.

Many of the Guitar Hero games developed for the recent generation of consoles (Xbox 360, PlayStation 3, and Wii) support downloadable content, allowing players to purchase new songs to play in the respective titles. Songs each cost approximately $2 through the various online stores for the console's platform. Prior to Guitar Hero 5, downloadable content for earlier games will not work in other games in the series, save for songs from Metallica's Death Magnetic, which were available for Guitar Hero III, World Tour, and Metallica. Existing World Tour downloadable content for World Tour will be forward-compatible with Guitar Hero 5, Band Hero and Guitar Hero Warriors of Rock, and for a small fee, some songs from both Guitar Hero World Tour and Guitar Hero Smash Hits can be exported to both Guitar Hero 5 and Band Hero, limited by music licensing. Activision has also stated that they are considering a monthly subscription service to deliver downloadable content to user for future games. Guitar Hero World Tour introduced a music creation mode that will allow players to create and share songs (excluding vocals) via the "GHTunes" service, which was also used in all other Guitar Hero games and Band Hero since its inclusion. The creation tools were improved with Guitar Hero 5 and Band Hero to allow longer songs and other means of generating songs in real-time.

In the first two games and the 2007 expansion Guitar Hero Encore: Rocks the 80s, the majority of the songs on the main career mode set lists are covers of the original song; for example, a song may be presented as "Free Bird as made famous by Lynyrd Skynyrd". Guitar Hero III: Legends of Rock introduces a much larger range of original recordings, and World Tour featured a setlist that contained all master recordings. The covers throughout the games are mostly recreated by WaveGroup Sound who has worked before to create songs for Beatmania, Dance Dance Revolution, and Karaoke Revolution, making small changes to the guitar portions to make them more adaptable for gameplay. Almost all of the unlockable bonus songs are songs performed by the original artist for the game (the only exception is the song "She Bangs the Drums" by The Stone Roses, which is featured in Guitar Hero III: Legends of Rock).

Prior to the release of Guitar Hero III: Legends of Rock, Activision worked with the iTunes Store to provide more than 1300 tracks of Guitar Hero-related music across more than 20 compilations, including most of the tracks from the games in the series, called "Guitar Hero Essentials". These compilations, such as "Killer Guitar Solos" and "Guitar Anthems of the '80s", include songs related to but not contained within the Guitar Hero series. Dusty Welch of RedOctane stated, "Where there's music, there's Guitar Hero, and with iTunes, we are able to provide fans with a central location for downloading their favorite rock anthems." Following the merger of Activision and Blizzard, the new company announced plans to create an alternative to iTunes based on the Guitar Hero brand that would allow for downloading songs and their associated note tracks for the Guitar Hero games.

== Reception and sales ==
Aggregate review scores As of December 25, 2010.
Game	GameRankings	Metacritic
Guitar Hero	(PS2) 91.96%	(PS2) 91
Guitar Hero II	(X360) 92.29% (PS2) 92.07%	(X360) 92 (PS2) 92
Guitar Hero III: Legends of Rock	(Wii) 86.26% (X360) 85.75% (PS2) 85.50% (PS3) 83.77% (PC) 78.00%	(Wii) 86 (X360) 85 (PS3) 83 (PS2) 82 (PC) 79
Guitar Hero World Tour	(Wii) 86.28% (X360) 84.44% (PS3) 83.33% (PS2) 81.20%	(Wii) 86 (X360) 85 (PS3) 84
Guitar Hero 5	(Wii) 89.58% (PS3) 86.58% (X360) 85.66% (PS2) 45.00%	(Wii) 89 (PS3) 86 (X360) 85 (PS2) 71
Guitar Hero: Warriors of Rock	(Wii) 80.07% (X360) 75.20% (PS3) 74.35%	(Wii) 77 (PS3) 74 (X360) 72
Guitar Hero Live	(WIIU) 83.75% (PS4) 81.91% (XONE) 80.93%	(WIIU) 84/100 (XONE) 81/100 (PS4) 80/100

Games in the Guitar Hero series have been generally well received by critics. The initial games were highly praised by reviewers. Neversoft's first entry to the series, Guitar Hero III, was considered to be too difficult, with many difficult songs presenting players with "walls of notes"; the developers later acknowledged this. Subsequent efforts in Guitar Hero: Aerosmith and Guitar Hero World Tour were seen to have some improvements, with Guitar Hero: Metallica considered to be a well-polished title and, at that time, the best Guitar Hero title Neversoft has produced. Guitar Hero 5's improvements toward social gameplay were complemented by reviewers and considered a further improvement upon the series. Entertainment Weekly put it on its end-of-the-decade, "best-of" list, saying, "An addictive videogame provides the illusion of musical mastery for even the least gifted:. How do you get to Carnegie Hall? Tap, tap, tap."

Upon release, the first game was seen as an unexpected hit, earning over US$45 million with about 1.5 million copies sold. Guitar Hero II was significantly more financially successful, with over 1.3 million copies sold and sales over US$200 million. Guitar Hero III, according to Activision, was the first single video game to sell more than US$1 billion at retail, with nearly 3.5 million copies sold during the first seven months of 2008. World Tour continued the series' high sales records with 3.4 million units sold in the United States during 2008. More than 60 million downloadable tracks have been purchased across the series as of February 2010. Both Guitar Hero III and World Tour were listed on a March 2011 list from the NPD Group of top-grossing games in unadjusted sales in the United States since 1995; Guitar Hero III tops the list with total sales of $830.9 million.

Overall, the Guitar Hero series has sold more than 25 million units worldwide, earning US$2 billion at retail. Activision claimed the series to be the 3rd largest game franchise in 2009 after the Mario and Madden NFL franchises.

== Cultural impact ==
The Guitar Hero series has made a significant cultural impact, becoming a "cultural phenomenon". The series has helped to rekindle music education in children, influenced changes in both the video game and music industry, has found use in health and treatment of recovering patients, and has become part of the popular culture vernacular. Several journalists, including 1UP.com, Wired, G4TV, the San Jose Mercury News, Inc., The Guardian, and Advertising Age, considered Guitar Hero to be one of the most influential products of the first decade of the 21st century, attributing it as the spark leading to the growth of the rhythm game market, for boosting music sales for both new and old artists, for introducing more social gaming concepts to the video game market, and, in conjunction with the Wii, for improving interactivity with gaming consoles. Guitar Hero has seen a revitalization in the form of a software clone called Clone Hero, as observed in 2020.

== Legal and practical issues ==
=== PlayStation 3 incompatibility ===
Sony's PlayStation 3 console has no compatibility with the PlayStation 2 Guitar Hero controller on the system. While Guitar Hero and Guitar Hero II are fully backward-compatible through the hardware PlayStation 2 emulation in the initial North American release of the console, it was impossible at launch to use the guitar controller to play either game. Kai Huang, of RedOctane, states that they are "working on that with Sony right now – looking at how we can get all the PlayStation 2 guitars that are out there, and all the owners of them, to use them on the PlayStation 3." Nyko, an accessories company, was poised to make a special PlayStation 2 controller adapter for the PlayStation 3, but put the product on hold due to technical difficulties. Tac, another accessories company, also made a PlayStation 2 controller adapter for a PlayStation 3 game console so players could use their Guitar Hero guitar controllers that were made for the PlayStation 2 with a PlayStation 3. However, the May 2007 PlayStation 3 V1.80 system update has made the guitar controller compatible with generic PlayStation 2 controller to USB adapters when playing Guitar Hero and Guitar Hero II. In addition, Pelican Accessories has released a special controller adapter that supports both games, including the ability to switch the handedness of the guitar.

=== Litigation ===
Gibson Guitar Corporation, whose guitar likenesses have appeared in the Guitar Hero series from the first game to Guitar Hero Aerosmith, informed Activision on January 7, 2008, that it believed the games infringe its U.S. patent 5,990,405. Gibson claimed that this covers technology that simulates a concert performance via pre-recorded audio and a musical instrument. In response, Activision filed a suit seeking a declaration that it was not in violation of the Gibson patent; Activision also asserted that Gibson had given an implied license by waiting to assert the patent and that the patent was invalid. On March 17, 2008, Gibson sued six retailers (GameStop, Amazon.com, Wal-Mart, Target, Toys "R" Us and Kmart) for selling Guitar Hero products. Subsequently, on March 21, 2008, Gibson also filed a lawsuit against EA, MTV, and Harmonix over their game Rock Band also for violation of its patent, to which a Harmonix spokesperson stated that Gibson's claims are "completely without merit". Activision lawyer Mary Tuck stated in their legal filings that they believe that Gibson initiated the lawsuit due to the fact that "Activision was not [interested] in renewing the License and Marketing Support Agreement" with Gibson Guitars. In February 2009, the United States District Court for the Central District of California ruled against Gibson in their case against Activision, stating that the controllers are not musical instruments but "toys that represent other items", and that Gibson's patent only covers instruments that send out analog signals. Activision and Gibson settled the suit following this ruling.

Activision, through John Devecka, owns all of Devecka Enterprises' US and international patents that deal with music games. All patents issued by the USPTO are presumed valid.

In February 2010, Activision was sued by the Patent Compliance Group (PCG) for releasing Guitar Hero products with false patent claims, with the PCG asserting that games like Guitar Hero 5 and Band Hero were marked with up to 10 patents that are not used within the games along with several other improper patent pending claims. PCG claimed that "Acts of false marketing deter innovation and stifle competition in the marketplace." PCG's qui tam lawsuit was seeking up to $500 per unit sold if Activision was found liable. However, by June 2010, PCG had withdrawn the case without prejudice.

Aside from being a defendant, Activision has also acted as a plaintiff. In 2007, the company issued a cease and desist letter to Nicholas Piegdon, the developer of an open source piano teaching program called Piano Hero, demanding he change the name to something less similar to that of the Guitar Hero series. He complied and renamed the software Synthesia.

=== Oversaturation ===
Release timeline A timeline of the major North American releases for the Guitar Hero series from 2005 to 2011, including the saturation of titles around 2008 and 2009
2005	Guitar Hero November
2006	Guitar Hero II November
2007	Encore: Rocks the 80s July
2007	III: Legends of Rock October
2008	On Tour June
2008	Aerosmith June
2008	World Tour October
2008	On Tour: Decades November
2009	Metallica March
2009	On Tour: Modern Hits June
2009	Smash Hits June
2009	Guitar Hero 5 September
2009	DJ Hero October
2009	Band Hero November
2009	Van Halen December
2010	Warriors of Rock September
2010	DJ Hero 2 October

Many critics believed that the number of releases of Guitar Hero games was "milking" the brand name and oversaturating the market. PaRappa the Rapper creator Masaya Matsuura stated that the video game market was growing stale and needed to move beyond games that simply challenge the player to mimic the playing of licensed music. Ryan Geddes of IGN stated that he "hit the wall with play-along music games", and challenged the game makers to explore other ways to combine music and video games. Analysts stated that such games must continue to innovate instead of just providing more songs in order to prevent "genre fatigue". Jesse Divnich of Electronic Entertainment and Design Research commented that, much like Dance Dance Revolution, Guitar Hero and other music games explosively grew initially due to significant new features from other games but have become stagnant due to focusing on content over features, and suggested that for the genre to continue to grow, they must look to incremental changes as done with the first-person shooter genre. Former CEO for RedOctane, Kelly Sumner, believed that Activision "abused" the series, as "they tried to get too much out of the franchise too quickly".

The series has also been criticized for its release model in contrast to the Rock Band series, causing some players to hold contempt towards Activision. Harmonix considered the Rock Band series as a "music platform", and supported it with downloadable content and the ability to import songs from its games and expansions into most other games of the series. Critics argued that Guitar Hero should have been doing the same, either through releasing expansions that could be incorporated into the main games of the series, or by issuing the songs as downloadable content. The release of Guitar Hero: Smash Hits, reworking older songs from the series to full four-instrument band support but otherwise adding no additional material, was called "the definition of 'milking'" by reviewers, with no observable technical limitation as to why the songs could not be added as downloadable content. Ars Technica recognized that licensing issues might have limited when songs from one single game could be played in others of the series (such as the case for The Beatles: Rock Band), but that such cross-compatibility should have been a high priority for rhythm games. Furthermore, some expansions were praised for the additional content beyond the note-matching gameplay; Guitar Hero: Metallica is considered to be one of the series' best works to be developed by Neversoft in part due to the care that the developers took with imaging the band and the available extras for the game. Activision later revealed that both Guitar Hero 5 and Band Hero would support playing songs from both Guitar Hero World Tour (both on-disc and downloadable content) and Guitar Hero Smash Hits, with music licensing being the only limiting factor on which songs could be made forward-compatible.

The large number of Guitar Hero and Rock Band titles on the market is considered to be partially responsible for the sharp decline of music game sales in the latter half of 2009, along with the effects of the late-2000s recession. The market for rhythm games was $1.4 billion in 2008, but dropped to $700 million (a 50% decrease) in 2009 even though more titles were available that year. Former Neversoft project director Brian Bright noted that at one point in 2009, they were responsible for the release of three games that year (Guitar Hero 5, Metallica, and Band Hero) and supporting other studios for the development of two additional games, causing the studio to lose focus both in development and marketing efforts. According to Bright, sales of all the Guitar Hero games released in 2009 totaled the number of sales of the 2008 title World Tour, demonstrating the dilution of the marketing. Though Activision had originally planned on tripling the offerings of the Guitar Hero series in 2010, the company readjusted their plans, reducing the number of offerings and focusing more on selling digital downloadable content for the series. Only two titles, Guitar Hero: Warriors of Rock and DJ Hero 2 were released in 2010, both scheduled for the "back half of 2010". Analysts predicted that the market would evolve to support a smaller number of titles each year, averaging at a "healthy" value in the range of $500–600 million in revenues annually. Kotick believed that part of the downfall of Guitar Hero was due to Activision's introduction of DJ Hero, which they gave too much focus and left the core Guitar Hero games without the "nourishment and care" needed to continue to innovate in the series.

Activision Publishing chief executive Mike Griffith, in response to questions about Activision's approach to the Guitar Hero market, noted that Guitar Hero continues to outsell the Rock Band series in both number of sales and revenue, with consumers continuing to buy the separate games on the market, and considered the market acceptance of the multiple games as validation for their model. Activision also claimed to have conducted research that showed there was solid consumer interest in products such as DJ Hero and Band Hero, each of which had a markedly different focus than the main installments of the series; series spokesperson Eric Hollreiser suggested the experimental approach would attract players who wanted different styles of music or a different peripheral with which to relate to the music. Regardless, after releasing 25 different SKUs (between games and bundle packages) in 2009, Activision opted to reduce that number to 10 in 2010, recognizing the music game genre was not as profitable as it once was. Activision later opted to suspend future development of the series in early 2011 citing weak sales in the rhythm game genre, a move that many journalists attributed to Activision's earlier oversaturation.

== List of games ==
Year	Title	Developer(s)	Platform											
Year	Title	Developer(s)	PS2	PS3	PS4	X360	XONE	Wii	Wii U	Win	Mac	DS	Phone	Other
Main games
2005	Guitar Hero	Harmonix	Yes	No	No	No	No	No	No	No	No	No	No	No
2006	Guitar Hero II	Harmonix	Yes	No	No	Yes	No	No	No	No	No	No	No	No
2007	Guitar Hero III: Legends of Rock	Neversoft; Budcat Creations (PS2); Vicarious Visions (Wii); Aspyr (Windows/Mac)	Yes	Yes	No	Yes	No	Yes	No	Yes	Yes	No	No	No
2008	Guitar Hero World Tour	Neversoft; Budcat Creations (PS2); Vicarious Visions (Wii); Aspyr (Windows/Mac)	Yes	Yes	No	Yes	No	Yes	No	Yes	Yes	No	No	No
2009	Guitar Hero 5	Neversoft; Budcat Creations (PS2); Vicarious Visions (Wii)	Yes	Yes	No	Yes	No	Yes	No	No	No	No	No	No
2010	Guitar Hero: Warriors of Rock	Neversoft; Vicarious Visions (Wii)	No	Yes	No	Yes	No	Yes	No	No	No	No	No	No
2015	Guitar Hero Live	FreeStyleGames	No	Yes	Yes	Yes	Yes	No	Yes	No	No	No	Yes	No
Band-centric games
2008	Guitar Hero: Aerosmith	Neversoft; Budcat Creations (PS2); Vicarious Visions (Wii)	Yes	Yes	No	Yes	No	Yes	No	Yes	Yes	No	No	No
2009	Guitar Hero: Metallica	Neversoft; Budcat Creations (PS2/Wii)	Yes	Yes	No	Yes	No	Yes	No	No	No	No	No	No
2009	Guitar Hero: Van Halen	Underground Development; Budcat Creations (PS2/Wii)	Yes	Yes	No	Yes	No	Yes	No	No	No	No	No	No
Expansion games
2007	Guitar Hero Encore: Rocks the 80s	Harmonix	Yes	No	No	No	No	No	No	No	No	No	No	No
2009	Guitar Hero Smash Hits	Beenox	Yes	Yes	No	Yes	No	Yes	No	No	No	No	No	No
2009	Band Hero	Neversoft; Budcat Creations (PS2); Vicarious Visions (Wii/DS)	Yes	Yes	No	Yes	No	Yes	No	No	No	Yes (Note: Guitar/Bass not compatible with Nintendo DSi series or Nintendo 3DS, as the Guitar Grip peripheral plugs into SLOT-2 on the Nintendo DS and DS Lite, which the DSi and 3DS do not have. Furthermore, the drum grip accessory only works with the DS Lite. Vocals are fully supported across all systems in the DS/3DS line.)	No	No
DJ Hero
2009	DJ Hero	FreeStyleGames	Yes	Yes	No	Yes	No	Yes	No	No	No	No	No	No
2010	DJ Hero 2	FreeStyleGames	No	Yes	No	Yes	No	Yes	No	No	No	No	No	No
Portable games
2008	Guitar Hero: On Tour	Vicarious Visions	No	No	No	No	No	No	No	No	No	Yes (Note: Not compatible with Nintendo DSi series or Nintendo 3DS, as the Guitar Grip peripheral plugs into SLOT-2 on the Nintendo DS and DS Lite, which the DSi and 3DS do not have.)	No	No
2008	Guitar Hero On Tour: Decades	Vicarious Visions	No	No	No	No	No	No	No	No	No	Yes	No	No
2009	Guitar Hero On Tour: Modern Hits	Vicarious Visions	No	No	No	No	No	No	No	No	No	Yes	No	No
Mobile series
2007	Guitar Hero III Mobile	Machineworks Northwest	No	No	No	No	No	No	No	No	No	No	Yes	No
2008	Guitar Hero III: Backstage Pass	Machineworks Northwest	No	No	No	No	No	No	No	No	No	No	Yes	No
2008	Guitar Hero World Tour Mobile	Machineworks Northwest	No	No	No	No	No	No	No	No	No	No	Yes	No
2009	Guitar Hero 5 Mobile	Glu Mobile	No	No	No	No	No	No	No	No	No	No	Yes	No
Other
2008	Guitar Hero Carabiner	Basic Fun, Inc.	No	No	No	No	No	No	No	No	No	No	No	Yes
2009	Guitar Hero Arcade	Raw Thrills	No	No	No	No	No	No	No	Yes	No	No	No	Yes
2010	Guitar Hero (iOS)	Vicarious Visions	No	No	No	No	No	No	No	No	No	No	Yes	Yes

== See also ==
- Alex Necochea and Bryn Bennett: the 'Guitar Heroes' of Bang Camaro on Wikinews
- "Guitar Queer-O", an episode of South Park
- Rocksmith, a 2011 video game similar to Guitar Hero that uses a real guitar to teach players songs.
- Clone Hero, a 2017 clone of Guitar Hero
