= Clone Hero =

2017 video game

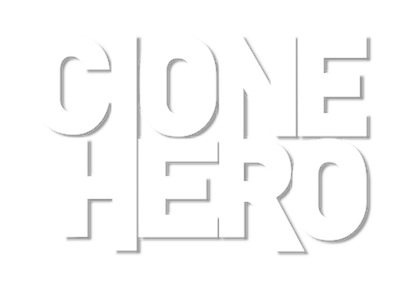
- Developer: CH Team
- Publisher: CH Team
- Designer: Ryan Foster
- Engine: Unity
- Platforms: Microsoft Windows, macOS, Linux, Android, iOS
- Release: November 29, 2022
- Genres: Music, rhythm
- Modes: Single-player, multiplayer

Clone Hero is a freeware music rhythm video game created by Ryan Foster, released on November 29, 2022, after being in development since 2011. The game is a clone of the Guitar Hero franchise with nearly identical gameplay. The main draw of the game is its ability to play community-made songs, which has resulted in a large fan community around the game as well as a resurgence in popularity for the genre.

== Gameplay ==
Screenshot of guitar gameplay, showcasing notes on the highway; the hit window; song progression, star, and star power meters; point, star, and combo counters; and the combo multiplier.

Clone Hero, by design, features nearly identical gameplay to Guitar Hero, and uses GUI assets from Guitar Hero games. Gameplay involves hitting colored notes in time to songs; Clone Hero allows players to use any PC-compatible controller from the Guitar Hero or Rock Band franchises, as well as a keyboard or any other input device. Unlike the Guitar Hero series, by default there is no penalty for missing notes, aside from breaking a combo, making it impossible to fail a song, although there is an option to enable this.

For guitar, players must hold specific buttons that line up with combinations of five colored notes that are arranged on a track referred to as a "highway" or, as some players term it, a "fretboard", similar to that on an actual guitar. When the notes hit the bottom of the highway, the player must strum to hit the notes in time with the music. Notes can be singular, or multiple at a time, forming a chord. Notes can also be sustains (internally hold notes), in which the player must hold the matching button(s) after strumming, the duration of the hold being indicated by a line following the note or chord. There is also an "open strum" note, represented with a purple bar, which requires the player to strum without pressing any other buttons. In addition to normal notes, there are "HOPO"s ("hammer-ons" and "pull-offs") and "tap notes", which both do not require the player to strum them to hit them, with the difference between the two being that a string of HOPOs must begin with a strum, and the player must re-strum if they miss a note. Certain notes may also be part of a "star power phrase", marked by a series of notes with star outlines. Successfully playing the marked section will reward the player with star power, which can be used to double the combo multiplier for a limited time. The game also contains a mode which emulates the guitar gameplay of Guitar Hero Live, which is notably different from other games in the series, involving six guitar buttons instead of the standard five.

For drums, gameplay is similar, involving one less possible note; players must hit a corresponding drum or cymbal when a note hits the bottom of the highway. There is also a bass drum note, represented by an orange bar, which unlike the guitar's open strum can be combined with other notes. Drums were not added until the Playable Test Builds of 1.0.

Unlike Guitar Hero games which each have a large built-in setlist, Clone Hero comes pre-bundled with only seventeen songs as of the v1.0 update, including "Troopers of the Stars" by DragonForce, a composition made by the band specifically for Clone Hero. The game instead largely relies on the ability to play community-made songs, called "charts". Unlike games in the Guitar Hero series, these songs do not need to be original compositions, and can instead be any audio file a member of the community wishes to turn into a playable chart. This allows for any song to be made playable in the game, but also leads to many humorous and/or non-musical audio files being turned into charts, as well as the creation of many intentionally impossible charts. The freedom offered by the game's system has also spawned many charts that are created as brutal challenges to other players, far beyond the difficulty of anything in the standard Guitar Hero series. While Clone Hero includes the main four difficulty modes seen in Guitar Hero, the vast majority of charts are designed for Expert mode. Charts can also be split into different instrumental tracks where, if toggled, missing a note will mute the instrument being played to the set volume.

== Development ==
Clone Hero started as a small project of Ryan Foster's in 2011, then called GuitaRPG, built in the XNA engine and bearing simple, 2D graphics. Around 2015, the game's name was changed to Guitar Game to reflect its forking away from the RPG style, and had been upgraded with pseudo-3D graphics made with 2D graphics with warped perspective. The project was later moved to Unity, and received its final name change to Clone Hero. In 2017, the game had its first alpha release.

== Setlist ==
Song title	Artist	Year	Genre
"Biology"	Fox Vibes	2017	Math Rock
"Challenger (feat. Krank'it Critch)"	1.O.M	2021	Metal
"Chopin Waltz Op64 No.2"	Bumblefoot	2024	Heavy Metal
"Coalescence & Segmentation"	ExileLord	2021	"Suffering"
"Combat Mosh"	Lich King	2012	Thrash Metal
"Crumbling Castle"	King Gizzard & the Lizard Wizard	2017	Progressive Rock
"Discovery"	Æternity	2024	Synthetic Metal
"Embrace"	APG	2007	Alternative Metal
"Enact the Ending (2023 Redux)"	Thousand Sun Sky	2023	Progressive Metal
"Flamewall"	Camellia	2020	Symphonic Speed Metal
"Fool Around"	3-UP	2022	Chiptune
"Galaxies in Harmony"	Jarod Fedele	2018	Progressive Metal
"The Garden"	FOXCULT	2023	Post-Hardcore
"Gone (feat. Rasmus Bom Andersen)"	Jacob Rabin	2020	Progressive Metal
"Good Grief Retreat"	Belvedere	2021	Punk Rock
"i ws nvr yr grlfrnd"	begin again	2015	Pop Punk
"Moonhunter"	Echoflesh	2020	Progressive Rock
"No Known Suspects"	Synovial	2020	Progressive Metalcore
"Old Climb"	Coma Hole	2022	Stoner Metal
"The Palace of the Kantus"	Hammer of Dawn	2021	Technical Death Metal
"The Paranoia"	Sorrowfuse	2023	Alternative
"Power On (feat. Charlie N Thompson & Nic Zayas)"	Alice Kane Wolf	2020	Djent
"Pressure"	Cory Hotline	2020	Future Funk
"Resurrection"	Pete Mathers	2024	Metalcore
"Revenge"	Adrenalized	2019	Hardcore Punk
"Saurian King"	Shadow of Intent	2022	Symphonic Death Metal
"Set You Free"	Ascension	2023	Power Metal
"Stigma"	Thousand Thoughts	2020	Alternative Metal
"Stop Saying We Sound Like Dragonforce"	Fraser Edwards	2020	Power Metal
"Troopers of the Stars"	DragonForce	2019	Power Metal

== Reception ==
Clone Hero made appearances at Awesome Games Done Quick 2020 and Summer Games Done Quick 2023. Both showcases were performed by Rhythm Game content creator Acai. The game has been praised for its large and thriving community, as well as its gameplay which has been favorably compared to the original Guitar Hero games.
