= Eric Conveys an Emotion =

Humor website

- Website type: Comedy
- Available in: English
- Owner: Eric Wu
- Creator: Eric Wu
- Website: http://emotioneric.com
- Launched: 1998
- Current status: Online

Eric Conveys an Emotion is a humor website in which the site's owner Eric Wu (born 1976 or 1977) has taken requests for emotions, and then posts photos of himself acting out the emotions.

== Description ==
The site features images of Eric Wu acting out almost 300 so-called "emotions" requested by readers. Although the earliest images uploaded depicted such traditional emotions as happiness, anger and fear, the scope rapidly broadened to include other mental states ("reserved", "flirtatious") and states with non-psychological components ("psychotic gaze", "sneeze coming"). Some images display Eric's imagined reactions to very specific situations such as "Working on a tech support line, answering your 500th call of someone who claims he can't send email", or envisage physical activity as in "I would like to see Eric hurt physically. Preferably, he falls down long stairs...like in The Exorcist or something". Eric sometimes plays with the suggestions, as when "Stoned" featured him being hit with stones and "Procrastination" was simply labeled NOT FINISHED YET.

Eric conceded in one interview that the site was "pointless", but considered it justified by the e-mail feedback he had received.

== History ==
Eric Wu established the site in 1998, during a period of boredom while studying at the University of Florida. According to one report, he had "hooked a camcorder up to his PC and wondered what to do with it". Eric continued to update it after becoming a webmaster in Silicon Valley.

For the month of July 2003, Eric promised to update the website with new emotions every Tuesday. His reasons were "Why Tuesday? Simple, because Strong Bad emails are on Mondays. See you Tuesday!" (Strong Bad Emails were the most popular feature of Homestar Runner at the time). The Brothers Chaps, creators of Homestar Runner, and several of their characters have appeared in the Football Game Adventure on the site. Some of these cameos are hard to spot: The Cheat appears on the sole of a shoe, for example.

Eric stopped adding emotions on August 10, 2004, reporting on December 29 that his server was in a "tizzy" and he would give a full analysis later. On January 2, 2005, Eric announced his website was "broken", going through some upgrades, and should be up shortly. On December 25, 2005, the site was updated for the first time since January, adding a new adventure called "The Mall". After this it was widely accepted that the site had been abandoned, with one student journalist citing this as evidence that "auteur-style" humor sites were being displaced by the more anarchic brand of comedy characteristic of YouTube.

However, Eric posted a new news entry on July 21, 2006, renewing the possibility of a regularly updated website. Another update was posted on April 1, 2008, along with a new adventure, which also featured the Brothers Chaps, focusing on in-universe game developer Videlectrix.

On April 12, 2020, the website appeared on the now deleted YouTube channel UnusAnnus. Eric Wu acknowledged this on his Twitter.

== Recognition ==
Eric states that he has never sought to publicize the site, but favorable press notices and a BBC Radio interview appeared within two years of its foundation. By May 2000 Eric was receiving more than 100 requests and 1000 hits per day, and by December 2002 the site had been covered by "media in Germany, the United Kingdom, Hungary, Spain, Italy and the Czech Republic".

In 2003, the site was one of five nominated for a Webby Award in the humor category. In spite of being identified by the San Francisco Chronicle's Peter Hartlaub as "[a]mong the best" that year (along with Whitehouse.org in the same category), it lost out to the webcomic Get Your War On.
