= Poker Night at the Inventory =

2010 video game

- Poker Night at the Inventory cover. Characters (Left to Right): Tycho Brahe, Max, the Heavy Weapons Guy (RED team), Strong Bad
- Developer: Telltale Games (Note: Remastered version developed and published by Skunkape Games.)
- Publisher: Telltale Games
- Composer: Jared Emerson-Johnson
- Engine: Telltale Tool
- Platforms: Microsoft Windows; Mac OS X; Nintendo Switch; PlayStation 4
- Release: Windows, OS X; November 22, 2010; Remaster; PS4, Switch, Windows; March 5, 2026
- Genre: Card game
- Mode: Single-player

Poker Night at the Inventory is a 2010 crossover poker video game developed by Telltale Games. It is the second poker game released by Telltale, following Telltale Texas Hold'em, and features four characters from different franchises: Tycho Brahe from the Penny Arcade webcomic, Max from the Sam & Max franchise, the RED Heavy Weapons Guy from Team Fortress 2, and Strong Bad from the Homestar Runner web series. The game was released on November 22, 2010, and delisted from sale in 2019. A sequel, Poker Night 2, was released in 2013. A remaster by Skunkape Games was released on March 5, 2026 for Nintendo Switch, PlayStation 4, and Windows.

== Gameplay ==
Gameplay of Poker Night at the Inventory showing the player winning a showdown with Max with a straight. Strong Bad and the Heavy have folded and Tycho has busted out. Strong Bad is saying "Nice hand, gigantic cheater." to the player.

Poker Night is a computer-based Texas Hold 'Em poker simulation between the player as an unseen silent participant and four computer-controlled characters: Max of Sam & Max, Strong Bad from Homestar Runner, the Heavy (as RED) from Team Fortress 2, and Tycho from Penny Arcade, all of whom have different playing styles. The game takes place in the Inventory, a secret club built underneath a video game storage warehouse. The game's backstory establishes the club as having been established in 1919 when its founder learned of an early draft of the 18th Amendment, which would have banned games and amusements in addition to alcohol; though this never came to pass, the club has existed since in secret, just in case Congress tried to set prohibition into law. Reginald Van Winslow from Tales of Monkey Island hosts the game and raises the blinds, while other characters from Telltale's games make cameo appearances in the introduction sequence.

Each player starts with a $10,000 buy-in for a total of $50,000 for the entire table and stays in the game until they are broke or until one player is left. The game uses no-limit betting and gradually-increasing blind bets over the course of several rounds. During some random events, one of the four non-playable characters will not be able to front the money but will offer one of their possessions as buy-in for the game. The player can win these items as Team Fortress 2 unlockable equipment only if they are the one to bust that non-player character out of the game. The game keeps track of the player's statistics over the course of several games; each time the player accrues a certain total number of wins, they will unlock different playing card or table artwork to customize the look of the game.

== Development ==
On May 15, 2009, Telltale Games started a survey which was meant to gauge fan reaction to a sequel to Telltale Texas Hold'em. While the team liked the deep conversations that the characters in the original game had, they decided to not go down the same path for the new game, using recognizable licensed characters rather than original "generic" ones.

Poker Night grew out of an idea from Telltale employees, wondering "what video characters do when they're not 'on the clock' in the games we play", according to Telltale CEO Dan Conners. From there, they pitched the idea to other companies in the industry and were able to work out which characters they would be able to include. Telltale considered how the four characters would interact with each other, developing dialog, banter, and reactions to certain plays. The characters, they decided, would be fully voiced, and would have distinctive tells and dynamic responses that would manifest themselves as the game progressed. Conners stated that the goal was to create the experience of "hanging out with their virtual buddies, shooting the breeze and playing a good game of poker". Telltale considered a potential series based on this game using different characters, noting that the first game would need to see sales exceeding 100,000 to 200,000 units to make it feasible.

Telltale Games have had previous experience working with several of the characters. Two of Telltale's episodic adventure series include three seasons of Sam & Max and Strong Bad's Cool Game for Attractive People based on the Homestar Runner web series; both were developed in conjunction with the original creators, Steve Purcell and The Brothers Chaps, respectively. The appearance of Max and Strong Bad in Poker Night are based on the three-dimensional models from these games. The company's team were also fans of Valve's Team Fortress 2, including creating an informal team to participate in a competition between several game development studios; Telltale offered to create unique items based on Sam & Max to be given as a bonus gift for those who purchased Sam & Max: The Devil's Playhouse through Steam, and formed a friendly working relationship with Valve as a result.

Telltale aimed to make the game dialog-centric between the four featured characters. To that end, they created a large amount of dialog for each character and possible interactions between the characters; according to Jake Rodkin, Telltale's graphic designer, they wrote more lines of dialog for the game than a typical Sam & Max adventure episode. Telltale always wanted to respect the original characters and worked with the individual creators and studios to improve the lines; they previously had gotten similar input from Matt Chapman for Strong Bad, while Jerry Holkins was extremely helpful to refine Tycho's character based on Telltale's draft dialog. The developers also wanted to avoid any forced interactions, and instead developed what they felt were natural relationships: Tycho dislikes Strong Bad while getting along well with Max, while the Heavy looks upon Strong Bad as a tiny Heavy. The characters are also written to be somewhat cognizant of their nature; according to Rodkin, Tycho and Strong Bad are aware of their video game nature, while Max is ambiguous and the Heavy remains blissfully unaware of his death-and-respawning cycle, simply attributing his memories of dying over and over again as dreams.

Poker Night is the first game to include a voice artist for Tycho; provided by voice actor Andrew "Kid Beyond" Chaikin. The other three characters are voiced by their then-current voice actors: Max by William Kasten, Heavy by Gary Schwartz, and Strong Bad by Matt Chapman. The game uses existing 3D models for Max, Heavy, and Strong Bad, while Tycho's is built from scratch; at the time of the game's announcement near the Penny Arcade Expo, Telltale was still working on refining Tycho's model, though it was briefly seen during their Make a Scene panel at PAX.

The game was teased by Telltale Games a week prior to its official announcement through a short video on GameTrailers TV, showing the silhouettes of the four characters' official art. The game was officially announced by Telltale Games on September 2, 2010, the eve of the 2010 Penny Arcade Expo. Players who have Team Fortress 2 in their Steam library are able to unlock unique items based on the four respective franchises within that game through progress in Poker Night; a special poker visor for Team Fortress 2 was also available for those that pre-ordered the game.

== Reception ==
Reception

Aggregate score
Aggregator	Score
Metacritic	71/100

Review scores
Publication	Score
Destructoid	6/10
GamePro	4/5
GameStar	61%
GamesTM	7/10
Gamezebo	4/5
IGN	8/10
Joystiq	(Mac) 2.5/5
Macworld	(Mac) 4/5
PALGN	6.5/10
PC Gamer (US)	70%

The game received "mixed or average" reviews according to the review aggregation website Metacritic. It was praised for its humorous interactions and the characters' unique strategies, but received criticism for its animation quality and various bugs.

== Legacy ==
On April 1, 2013, Telltale officially announced a sequel, titled Poker Night 2, featuring Brock Samson from The Venture Bros., Claptrap from the Borderlands series, Ash Williams from The Evil Dead franchise, and Sam from Sam & Max as opponents. GLaDOS from the Portal series serves as the dealer. Other characters such as Max from Sam & Max, the Aperture Science turrets from Portal, and Mad Moxxi and Steve the Bandit from Borderlands make non-playable appearances. The game was released on Steam, Xbox Live Arcade, and PlayStation Network in late April 2013. It was released on the IOS the following month. Both games were later delisted from sale following Telltale's closure.

On February 4, 2026, a remaster of Poker Night at the Inventory was announced by Skunkape Games, a studio made up of ex-Telltale developers who had previously remastered the company's Sam & Max games. In addition to retaining the unlockable Team Fortress 2 items, the remaster features improved graphics and animation, gamepad support, new unlockable card and table artwork, better AI for the other players, and the ability to set the starting buy-in. The remaster was released on March 5, 2026 for Nintendo Switch, PlayStation 4, and Windows.
