= Strong Bad Sings (and Other Type Hits) =

Compilation album by The Brothers Chaps and Y-O-U
- Released: November 17, 2003 (CD); September 11, 2019 (download); February 23, 2021 (vinyl)
- Recorded: May–August 2003, Pairadeez Productions
- Genres: Comedy, heavy metal, hard rock, hip hop
- Length: 40:06
- Label: Cheap as Free
- Producers: The Brothers Chaps; Y-O-U

Professional ratings
Review scores
Source	Rating
AllMusic	3.5/5 stars

Strong Bad Sings (and Other Type Hits) is a compilation album featuring songs by Strong Bad and other characters from the Homestar Runner web cartoon series. Strong Bad Sings is the sole audio CD spinoff from the online cartoon world of homestarrunner.com. The songs represent various pastiches of popular music, such as glam metal, folk, hip hop, techno and indie rock.

The songs "Trogdor" and "Because It's Midnite" appear in Guitar Hero II and Guitar Hero Encore: Rocks the 80s, respectively. There is also a hidden track titled "Secret Song" that features Homestar Runner. The disc also contains a music video for "These Peoples Try to Fade Me", inferred to be animated in-universe by The Cheat, in the style of Powered by The Cheat (his series of amateur Flash cartoons).

A vinyl was released on February 23, 2021, under Fangamer.

== Track listing ==
Side A
No.	Title	Length
1.	"Trogdor"	1:39
2.	"The System Is Down"	1:46
3.	"Strong Badia National Anthem"	2:12
4.	"Oh Yeah Yeah"	1:09
5.	"Because, It's Midnite"	2:13
6.	"Circles"	2:13
7.	"Let's Get Started on Doing All Those Awesome Things I Suggested"	0:48
8.	"Moving Very Slowly"	4:06
9.	"Sweet Cuppin' Cakes Theme Song"	0:56
10.	"I Think I Have a Chance with This Guy"	0:56
11.	"It's Like It Was Meant to Be"	1:05

Side B
No.	Title	Length
1.	"Nite Mamas"	2:27
2.	"Sensitive to Bees"	1:54
3.	"You've Got an Ugly & Stupid Butt"	0:32
4.	"These Peoples Try to Fade Me"	2:11
5.	"The Ladies in My Town All Know My Name"	0:34
6.	"Theme from Dangeresque II: This Time, It's Not Dangeresque I"	1:30
7.	"Somebody Told Me (Now I Believe Them)"	0:47
8.	"The Cheat Is Not Dead"	3:02
9.	"Everybody to the Limit (Live)" (Song ends at 3:53; hidden track plays at 6:20 after 2:27 of silence)	7:56

== Musicians ==
- Matt Chapman – Lead vocals, piano
- Mike Chapman – Guitar, bass, keyboards
- Missy Palmer – Lead vocals, guitar

=== Y-O-U ===
- Nick Niespodziani – Backing vocals, guitar, drums, keyboards, programming
- Peter Olson – Guitar, bass, programming
- Mark Cobb – Drums
- Eric Harlan Park – Keyboards, piano
- Matt Sonnicksen – Guitar, drums, keyboards, piano, backing vocals, bells
- J. Christopher Arrison – Guitar, bass, piano

== Writing credits ==
Music and lyrics for tracks 4 and 13 were written by Missy Palmer. All other lyrics were written by The Brothers Chaps. Music for tracks 5, 7, 9, 14, 17, 18, and 19 was written by The Brothers Chaps with members of Y-O-U. Music for tracks 8, 11, and 16 was written by The Brothers Chaps with J. Christopher Arrison and members of Y-O-U. All other music was written by The Brothers Chaps.
