= The Long-Playing EP =

EP by Y-O-U
- Released: July 25, 2009
- Recorded: 2008
- Genre: Rock
- Length: 22:39 (new tracks on iTunes); 51:14 (full length CD)
- Label: Pleaserock (independent)
- Producer: Ben H. Allen

Y-O-U chronology
| Flashlights (2007) | The Long-Playing EP (2009) |

Professional ratings
Review scores
| Source | Rating |
|---|---|
| Mixtape Atlanta | (favorable) link |

The Long-Playing EP is the fourth and final record from Atlanta rock group Y-O-U, released in July 2009. It consists of five new tracks and eight tracks taken from previous Y-O-U releases; the new songs originally having been intended for a 2008 album which fell through. According to lead singer Nick Niespodziani, the first three of the new songs from The Long-Playing EP were also planned to appear on a new LP to be released in 2010; however, the retirement of Y-O-U renders that plan moot.

== Track listing ==
1. "Firefly" (Niespodziani/Boyd) - 4:24
2. "Going Down Swinging" (Niespodziani) - 4:32
3. "Honest Man" (Niespodziani) - 4:32
4. "Moviekiss: The Lite Brite Remix" (Niespodziani/Olson/Cobb/Park/Sonnicksen) - 5:12
5. "Beautiful Thing" (Niespodziani/Olson/Cobb) - 3:59
6. "The Physics of Giving"_{C} (Niespodziani) - 4:23
7. "Not a Dove"_{B} (Niespodziani/Olson/Cobb) - 3:11
8. "Second Chance"_{C} (Niespodziani/Olson/Cobb) - 3:43
9. "Good Intentions"_{A} (Niespodziani/Olson/Cobb/Park/Sonnicksen) - 2:34
10. "Good Luck with That American Dream"_{B} (Niespodziani/Olson/Cobb) - 4:05
11. "Easy"_{A} (Niespodziani/Olson/Cobb/Park/Sonnicksen) - 3:16
12. "I Found You"_{C} (Niespodziani/Olson/Cobb) - 2:12
13. "Break"_{C} (Niespodziani) - 5:11

_{A: from Y-O-U}
_{B: from Everything is Shifting}
_{C: from Flashlights}

== Music video ==
"Moviekiss: The Lite Brite Remix"

- Dir: Gina Niespodziani
- Animated with a Lite Brite by the Niespodziani siblings.

== Personnel ==
=== Y-O-U ===
- Mark Bencuya - keyboards
- Mark Cobb - drums, percussion, vocals
- Nicholas Niespodziani - lead vocals, guitar, harmonica
- Peter Olson - bass, vocals

=== Additional musicians ===
- Horns: David B. Freeman, Wes Funderburk
- Backing vocals: Trina Meade, Stephani Parker

=== Technical ===
- Producer: Ben H. Allen
- Mastering: Glen Schick
- Assistant: Rob Gardner
- Photography: Gina Niespodziani
- Art concept: Nick & Gina Niespodziani
