= Flashlights (album) =

Studio album by Y-O-U
- Released: January 1, 2007 (online); January 23, 2007 (CD)
- Recorded: May 2006
- Genre: Rock
- Label: Pleaserock (independent)
- Producer: Geoff Melkonian, Y-O-U

Y-O-U chronology
Everything is Shifting (2005)	Flashlights (2007)	The Long-Playing EP (2009)

Flashlights is the third record by the Atlanta-based independent rock band Y-O-U. The album was first made available via free download on the band's MySpace profile on New Year's Day, 2007, and on compact disc on January 23 of the same year.

According to the band's official MySpace profile, Flashlights was the exclusive theme music of the Phillips Lounge at the 2007 Sundance Film Festival.

== Track listing ==
1. "The Physics of Giving (Einstein Song)" - 4:23
2. "Goodnight Goes" - 8:32
3. "Medicine Man" - 3:45
4. "Moviekiss" (new version) - 3:43
5. "...Now Everyone Knows..." (an extended ending of "Moviekiss") - 1:39
6. "Glad" - 1:03
7. "I Found You" - 2:12
8. "Break" - 5:11
9. "Alright, Alright, Alright" - 2:27
10. "All Arranged #7" (a different version of "All Arranged #2" from Everything is Shifting) - 4:30
11. "Second Chance" - 3:43
12. "Let It Go" - 3:05
13. "Glad I Found You. Again." - 0:40
14. "Effort" - 5:46

== Music videos ==
"The Physics of Giving"

- Dir: Ryan Sterritt (Homestar Runner technician)
- Sign language: Y-O-U

"Moviekiss"

- Dir: Adam Stills
- Video is composed of kiss scenes from movies.
- One video uses album version; an alternate similar video uses a live performance track.

"Break"

- Dir: Tyler James
- Feat: Clay Cook
- Song is a live performance, not the album version.
- Filmed in stop-motion animation.

== Personnel ==
=== Y-O-U is ===
- Nicholas Niespodziani
- Peter Olson
- ?Mark Cobb

=== Additional musicians ===
- Clay Cook - Guitar, organ, Rhodes, pedal steel, banjo, backing vocals
- Mark Bencuya - Piano, Wurlitzer, ARP strings
- Dog Stevens (Cobb) - Typewriter
- Saul Pimon (Olson) - Indian flute
- Lenny Koggins (Niespodziani) - Recorders

=== Technical ===
- Producer: Geoff Melkonian and Y-O-U
- Additional production: Kristofer Sampson and Cliff Byrd
- Engineer: Kristofer Sampson
- Additional engineering: Clay Cook, Peter Olson, Nicholas Niespodziani
- Mixer: David Barbe
- Mastered by: Alex Lowe
- Art Design & Photography: Theodore Schuyler
