= Yacht Rock Revue =

American rock band

- Origin: Atlanta, Georgia, U.S.
- Genres: Yacht rock; soft rock
- Years active: 2007–present
- Spinoff of: Y-O-U
- Members: Nicholas Niespodziani; Peter Olson; Greg Lee; Mark Dannells; Mark Bencuya; David B. Freeman; Keisha Jackson; Kourtney Jackson; Jason Nackers; Ganesh Giri Jaya

Yacht Rock Revue is an American rock band formed in Atlanta, Georgia, in 2007. Performing primarily covers, the band's set list is centered around "yacht rock", a genre coined by the mid 2000s web series of the same name that consists primarily of soft rock from the 1970s and 1980s and at times includes songs from the early 1990s.

The band was formed by members of the since-defunct indie rock band Y-O-U after an ironic performance of soft rock hits at a local club gig took off into a weekly residency. Yacht Rock Revue started as a side project and grew into the main focus for all seven band members: Peter Olson, Nicholas Niespodziani, Mark Cobb, Greg Lee, Mark Bencuya, Mark Dannells, and David Freeman. The band has a contract with Live Nation and tours nationally, playing more than 100 shows a year and selling out theaters in Los Angeles, Boston, Atlanta, and Washington, D.C. To keep up with demand, the band members launched a subsidiary band, Yacht Rock Schooner, in 2009.

In late 2019, the band released their first original single, "Step". Further, they announced their first album of original material, Hot Dads in Tight Jeans, which was released on February 21, 2020.

In 2023, the band was tapped as the opener for Kenny Loggins' "This Is It" Tour. In 2024, Yacht Rock Revue opened for REO Speedwagon and Train in shows across the U.S. from July to September.

== Related projects ==
In 2015, two of the founding band members, Peter Olson and Nicholas Niespodziani, opened Venkman's, a restaurant and music venue in Atlanta's Old Fourth Ward neighborhood. Venkman's closed in 2022 with tentative plans to reopen in a new location.

=== The Yacht Rock Revival ===
Yacht Rock Revue hosts an annual concert where they invite members of the original bands that they cover to join them on stage to play a few songs. The first Yacht Rock Revival was held in 2011 in a parking lot at Andrews Entertainment Complex in Atlanta with about 1,000 attendees. In 2018, the Revival was held at the State Bank Amphitheatre in Chastain Park to a sold-out crowd of over 6,000 people.

Over the years, Yacht Rock Revue has shared the stage with Walter Egan, Robbie Dupree, Elliot Lurie (Looking Glass), Peter Beckett (Player), Bobby Kimball (former lead singer of Toto), Jeff Carlisi (.38 Special), Albert Bouchard (Blue Öyster Cult), Bill Champlin (Chicago), Denny Laine (Wings) and more.
