= Strong Bad =

Fictional character from Homestar Runner

- Homestar Runner character
- First appearance: The Homestar Runner Enters the Strongest Man in the World Contest
- Created by: Matt and Mike Chapman; Craig Zobel
- Voiced by: Matt Chapman

In-universe information
- Weapon: Fists
- Family: Strong Sad (younger brother); Strong Mad (older brother); The Cheat (sidekick)

Strong Bad is a fictional character from Homestar Runner, an animated Flash web series, who is inspired by the video game Tag Team Wrestling; he got his name from the opponent team, "The Strong Bads" and his outfit from one of the player's fighters. He is voiced by Matt Chapman, the principal voice actor and co-creator of the series. Strong Bad enjoys pranking the other characters of the series, along with his ever-diligent lackey pet The Cheat and his older brother Strong Mad. Strong Bad first became popular due to his own segment on the Homestar Runner website, called "Strong Bad Emails". The Strong Bad Email series grew to be so popular that six DVDs featuring the emails have been released, as well as a podcast where emails could be downloaded to digital media players, since its first episode in 2001.

Strong Bad was created to be the main antagonist of the series but since then has become less of a villain and more of an antihero. However, he is still occasionally referred to as an antagonist, due to the pranks that he, Strong Mad, and The Cheat play on the other characters, and his insulting of his younger brother Strong Sad. He seems to be a character influenced by the American popular culture trends of the 1970s, 1980s, and 1990s, such as heavy metal music and the second and third-generations of video games and video game consoles. Since he is one of the site's most popular characters, merchandise has also spun off Strong Bad, which includes T-shirts and sweatshirts sold by the website.

Strong Bad has been one of the most popular characters in the series and has been well-received. In 2021, Polygon declared Strong Bad an icon. In a tribute, they note that "Strong Bad Email was far and away the most popular segment on Homestar Runner" and the series and character have "remained a "massive comedic influence" on others. Segments have been spun off his emails, including "Teen Girl Squad", a comic drawn by Strong Bad about four teenage friends, and "20X6", an anime-style cartoon featuring Japanese versions of the characters, such as Strong Bad's counterpart, "Stinkoman".

== Role in Homestar Runner ==
In the original The Homestar Runner Enters the Strongest Man in the World Contest book, as well as many of the early cartoons, Strong Bad mainly served as the antagonist to Homestar Runner. The two would frequently compete against each other in competitions, with Strong Bad often cheating. As the series drew away from competition-based stories and became more character-driven, Strong Bad became less of a villain; although he still dislikes Homestar and often tries to prank him, he mostly just views him as dim-witted and irritating. The two have been known to occasionally get along, however.

Along with his physically intimidating but mentally limited big brother Strong Mad and his yellow lackey The Cheat, Strong Bad represents the self-proclaimed criminal element in the series. Many shorts concern the various practical jokes and scams that they perpetrate. Although these are usually only slightly malevolent, Strong Bad still acts as if he is a villainous mastermind, and he is highly prone to exaggerating his alluring qualities—especially with regards to women. Strong Bad also "rules" an area of the fictional universe called Strong Badia. It consists of a barren field, a fence, a tire, and a stop sign reading "Pop: Tire" (Pop meaning population) leaning against a cinder block. Besides Strong Badia, he and The Cheat enjoy hanging out at a stick known as "The Stick".

=== Strong Bad Email ===
Strong Bad's main role in the cartoon is in the Strong Bad Email segment, in which he answers emails sent to him from viewers. The Strong Bad Emails began as a small segment in 2001, in which Strong Bad would mock the spelling and grammar of those who wrote to him, usually while typing with boxing gloves on an outdated computer. The question of how he types with boxing gloves on has become a running gag due to the frequency of emails concerning it, and seems to annoy Strong Bad. Most of the time a cut-away sequence is used to move the narrative beyond mere typing. Once the events of the email finish unfolding, Strong Bad wraps it up, and then "The Paper" or "New Paper" comes down with a link to Strong Bad's e-mail address. Often, hidden animations (Easter eggs) are displayed when the user clicks on a word or picture either during the email or after it has concluded. As of 2026, there are 210 Strong Bad emails. Although the animations were initially brief, they gradually grew to establish numerous catchphrases and running gags. His most used catchphrase was "Holy Crap!" and other variations on this theme (example: "What the crap?"), though he now parodies even this in his responses to emails.

==== Trogdor ====
Trogdor the Burninator is an original character created by Strong Bad in the 58th Strong Bad Email, titled "dragon". The cartoon features Strong Bad giving an Ed Emberley-inspired drawing tutorial to the viewer, illustrating a fire-breathing serpent with incongruous details including stick-figure feet and a single, large muscular arm. His fire-breathing destruction is referred to with the term "burnination".

The Trogdor character became very popular, with merchandise featuring the dragon consistently being the best-selling in the store. Trogdor was featured on several games on the website, and accompanied by a memorable song in his first appearance. He featured as the main antagonist of the final episode of Strong Bad's Cool Game for Attractive People, "8-Bit is Enough". In 2018, board game Trogdor!! The Board Game was funded via a Kickstarter campaign.

References to Trogdor have appeared throughout pop culture, with the "Trogdor" theme featured as a bonus song in Guitar Hero II and the dragon being mentioned in the finale of Buffy the Vampire Slayer.

=== Spinoffs ===
A recurring element of Homestar Runner is the re-imagining of the cast and world of the cartoon into a different genre. Variations of Strong Bad feature prominently in many of these series, such as the 1930s-themed "Old-Timey Strong Bad", the comic book superhero "Strong Badman", or the anime-styled "Stinkoman".

Many elements of Homestar Runner spun off from Strong Bad Emails, such as cartoon series Teen Girl Squad or characters Trogdor the Burninator and Homsar.

== Character ==
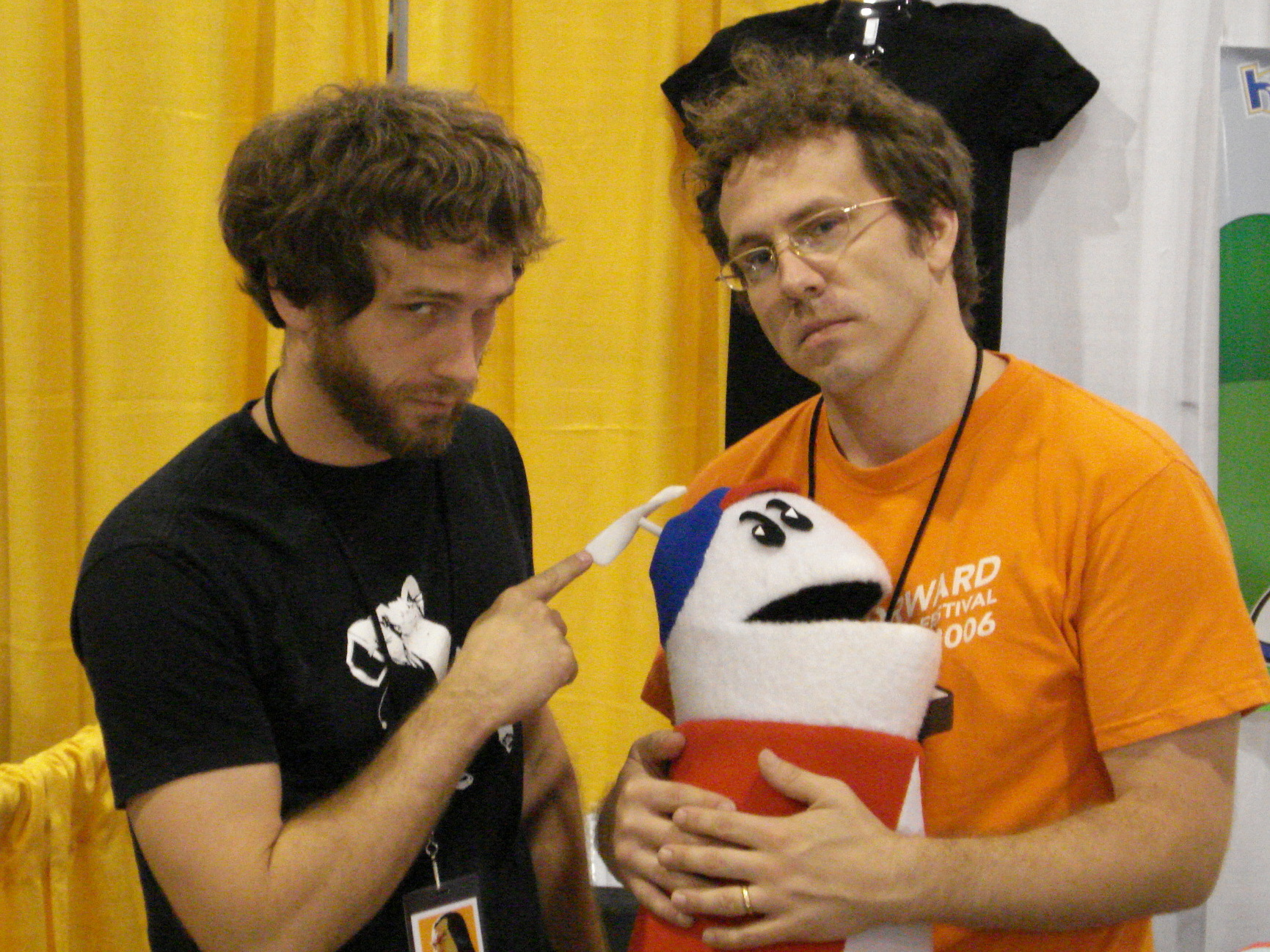
The Brothers Chaps (L-R): Matt (voice of Strong Bad) and Mike Chapman (co-creator of Strong Bad).

=== Creation ===
Along with several other Homestar Runner main characters, Strong Bad debuted in the 1996 parody children's book The Homestar Runner Enters the Strongest Man in the World Contest. The storybook focuses on friends The Homestar Runner and Pom-Pom entering a strongman competition, opposed by the cheating Strong Bad.

Seeking to design an obvious villain, inspiration came from "evil" masked wrestlers such as Mil Máscaras, Mr. Wrestling II, and most prominently the "Strong Bads" team from the NES video game Tag Team Wrestling. Strong Bad was therefore drawn as a stereotypical luchador, with a red-and-black mask, boxing gloves, tights, and going shirtless.

A few photocopies of the small, handmade book were distributed among friends, there was no serious attempt to publish or otherwise capitalize on it. Strong Bad would not be revisited for several years; in 1999, the brothers wanted to learn to use Flash and returned to the Homestar Runner characters as an outlet to do so.

=== Development ===
The earliest Homestar Runner cartoons revolved around the titular Homestar Runner taking part in athletic competitions, opposed by the villainous Strong Bad. The Brothers Chaps soon decided to instead focus on humorous moments taking place between competitions, which allowed for Strong Bad to be developed further in cartoon series like "Marzipan's Answering Machine" and "Strong Bad Email".

Strong Bad quickly became the site's breakout character, with Mike Chapman noting that fans seemed to enjoy "how he rags on everyone, but isn't very threatening." The Brothers Chaps decided to give him his own segment, Strong Bad Email (abbreviated as "sbemail") beginning in 2001; originally established as a brief, advice column-like format merely featuring Strong Bad typing at a computer, the format quickly evolved to more complex mini-cartoons. "Strong Bad Email" became a runaway success for the website: by early 2002 Strong Bad was already receiving hundreds of emails a day, peaking at eight thousand daily emails in the summer of 2003 before leveling off to two thousand a day.

Strong Bad started off with a prominent Mexican accent and a deep voice, which gradually transitioned into a more gruff and less-accented voice with more vocal range.

== Reception ==
Strong Bad has been received well by both critics and viewers of the website. He is considered one of the most popular characters of the website, and his Strong Bad Email segment is one of the most viewed segments of Homestar Runner. In an audio review of Strong Bad and the rest of the Homestar Runner characters, National Public Radio said "There are lots of nasty characters lurking in the shadowy corners of the World Wide Web. But Strong Bad is just awful. And he's awfully funny, too". Peter Wood of National Review Online commented on Strong Bad's personality and his evil-looking appearance. He stated: "Strong Bad is probably not the guy you want to move in next door. The red and black Wrestlemania mask he wears all the time is a clue. As are the boxing gloves, which he keeps on even when he is typing sarcastic e-mails ... He is one of the coolest characters on the Internet and the real star of Homestarrunner.com, which may be the most popular homegrown animation in the world." He added "Strong Bad also dabbles in other media and, like Professor Cornel West, has even recorded his own rap, 'Everybody to the Limit', which builds on the delightful typographic implosion, 'fhqwhgads'", and also said "The humor likewise combines the innocence of slapstick with sharp satire of American popular culture. ... At one point, tired of being asked how he types with boxing gloves on, Strong Bad attaches fake fingers: a shrimp, a lit birthday candle, and an action-figure toy." Johnny Dee, a reviewer from The Guardian, described the humor of Strong Bad. He wrote: "Like South Park and Modern Toss, Strong Bad isn't exactly beautiful to look at but he's relentlessly funny," and added, "Strong Bad is an animated Mexican wrestler ... and the undoubted star of surreal cartoon site Homestar Runner."

== In other media ==
=== Video games ===
Strong Bad's Cool Game for Attractive People is a point-and-click adventure game based on Homestar Runner and starring Strong Bad. The game was created by Telltale Games in partnership with The Brothers Chaps, and released for both the Nintendo Wii's WiiWare service and Microsoft Windows, later ported to PlayStation 3 as a PSN download and to OS X. It was released in an episodic format, with five episodes comprising the first season. No serious discussions or pre-production on a second season had taken place prior to Telltale's closure in 2018.

Telltale Games also featured Strong Bad as a character in Poker Night at the Inventory. Released November 22, 2010, the game features Strong Bad alongside other video game characters (Tycho from Penny Arcade, Heavy from Team Fortress 2, and Max from Sam & Max) as computer-controlled opponents playing Texas hold 'em poker against the player. Telltale CEO Dan Connors described the game as "exploring the idea of what video characters do when they're not 'on the clock' in the games we play." Matt Chapman provided input on the writing for Strong Bad.

=== Music ===
Strong Bad Sings (And Other Type Hits) is a 2003 album featuring new or re-recorded songs from the Homestar Runner site. Although many songs are performed by Strong Bad, other bands and characters from Homestar Runner are featured as well.

Spoken word lines from Strong Bad were featured on the Shellac song "Genuine Lulabelle", from the album Excellent Italian Greyhound.

Strong Bad makes a guest appearance on The Aquabats' 2011 album Hi-Five Soup!, providing vocals on the song "Pink Pants!". On July 14, 2012, Matt Chapman appeared onstage at an Aquabats concert in San Diego in character as Strong Bad, joining the band in a performance of "Trogdor".

A three-volume Homestar Runner soundtrack was released to music streaming platforms on April 10, 2020. All songs are credited to "Strong Bad", despite the fact that many are purportedly performed by other fictional characters or are simple instrumental pieces, as a result of limits on formatting compilation albums.

=== Other media ===
In 2011, Matt Chapman joined the production team of The Hub series The Aquabats! Super Show! as a writer and director. In the 2012 episode "CobraMan!", co-directed by Chapman, he appears onscreen as a villainous carnival worker named "Carl", who wears a wrestling mask identical to Strong Bad's and speaks in Strong Bad's voice.
