= Y-O-U =

American band

- Origin: Bloomington, Indiana, U.S.
- Genre: Rock
- Years active: 2000–present
- Label: Pleaserock
- Spinoffs: Yacht Rock Revue
- Members: Nicholas Niespodziani; Peter Olson; Greg Lee; Mark Dannells; Mark Bencuya; David B. Freeman; Keisha Jackson; Kourtney Jackson; Jason Nackers; Ganesh Giri Jaya
- Past members: Mark Cobb; Eric Harlan Park; Matt Sonnicksen; Clay Cook
- A: The main Y-O-U identity was retired in 2009, although the group continues to perform under its other aliases

Y-O-U, also known as the Pleaserock collective, is an American rock band formed in Bloomington, Indiana in 2000. Based out of Atlanta, Georgia since 2002, they are probably most widely known for their collaborations with The Brothers Chaps on projects such as Strong Bad Sings and the karaoke music from strongbad email.exe, as well as for their spinoff group Yacht Rock Revue. In addition, the Chapmans animated a music video for Y-O-U's song "LA Lindsay."

The band's self-titled debut album was released in 2003. Their next LP, Flashlights, was released on compact disc in January 2007, and as a promotional tactic, the entire album is also available as a free download via the band's MySpace profile. After a final record was released in the summer of 2009, the band announced its retirement from recording and performing their original music as Y-O-U.

Y-O-U is also known for short mockumentaries available on their website, their MySpace page, and YouTube.

In December 2006, Y-O-U was named one of the Top 25 Best Bands on MySpace by Rolling Stone.

== Discography ==
=== As Y-O-U ===
- Y-O-U (2003)
- Strong Bad Sings (2003, with The Brothers Chaps for Homestar Runner)
- Everything is Shifting (2005)
- Flashlights (2007)
- The Long-Playing EP (2009)

=== As Nespo Johnny ===
- Live @ Eddie's Attic 11.8.09 (2009)

=== As Yacht Rock Revue ===
- A Yacht Rock Christmas: "Mele Kalikimaka"/"Christmas Vacation" single (2009)
- Live at the Georgia Theatre (2012)
- Yacht Rock Revue EP (2013)
- Live in Boston (2019)
- Hot Dads in Tight Jeans (2020)
- Escape Artist (2024)

=== As Indianapolis Jones ===
- Indianapolis Jones (2014)
- Chaos and Light (2017)

== Members ==
- Nick Niespodziani - vocals, guitar, keyboards, harmonica, percussion (2000-present)
- Peter Olson - bass, guitar, keyboards, percussion, vocals (2000-present)
- Mark Bencuya - keyboards, vocals (2008–present)
- Greg Lee - bass, vocals (2009-present)
- Mark Dannells - guitar, vocals (2009-present)
- David Freeman - woodwinds, keyboards, percussion, vocals (2009-present)
- Keisha Jackson - vocals, percussion
- Kourtney Jackson - vocals, percussion
- Jason Nackers - drums (2022-present)
- Ganesh Giri Jaya - drums

=== Former members ===
- Mark Cobb - drums, keyboards, vocals (2000-2022)
- Eric Harlan Park - keyboards (2002–2004)
- Matt Sonnicksen - guitar, keyboards (2000–2004)
- Clay Cook - keyboards, guitar, banjo (2005–2006)

== Alias Rock ==
Y-O-U were officially dubbed "alias rockers" in early 2008 in a cover story by Southeast Performer Magazine, based on their many alter-ego groups which appear throughout Atlanta on a regular basis:

- Three Dawgh Stephens (also spelled as Three Dog Stevens) is a "sandal-rock" comedy trio and the subject of one of Y-O-U's mockumentary series. The band actually performs live in character (and in costume) outside of the filmed episodes. They have one song released online called "Furry Little Muskrat Woman."
- Constantly Awesome (formerly known as The Tupperware Party) is a cover band which plays mostly weddings and other private engagements.
- The Yacht Rock Revue is a large ensemble which performs exclusively soft rock covers, mostly from the 1970s, inspired in part by the web series Yacht Rock. They play public and private concerts and charity events. Both the Yacht Rock Revue and Y-O-U (as themselves) once played at the same festival on the same day.
- Please PleaseRock Me is a cover band focusing on the Beatles music, both group and solo.
- Nigels With Attitude is an XTC cover band.
- Uno Dos Tres Catorce is a U2 cover band.
- The Ill-Eagles are an Eagles cover band.
- Main Street Exiles are a Rolling Stones cover band.
- Indianapolis Jones is a new original-music venture.
- Nespo Johnny is the name Nick Niespodziani uses for solo appearances, in which he performs Y-O-U songs and new original work.
- The Greater Vavoom is a funk/disco band.
- Limozeen is a mock-glam metal band from the Homestar Runner universe; Y-O-U has performed as the band, with Matt Chapman singing lead, at two concerts so far.
- Rock Fight is an audience-decided musical battle between tribute sets to two other artists (the competitors in the "fight").
- John Macentoeshka and the Mosseknuckles (defunct) was a Europop quintet which used to perform at random "pseudonymous" public appearances.
- The Flying Wallabies (defunct), the subject of another mockumentary series, was not a band at all, but a "competitive" jump-roping team.

Despite the retirement of the original "Y-O-U" identity, the other active Pleaserock aliases continue to perform.
