= Guitar Hero Encore: Rocks the 80s =

2007 video game

- Developer: Harmonix
- Publisher: Activision
- Series: Guitar Hero
- Platform: PlayStation 2
- Release: NA: July 24, 2007; EU: July 27, 2007; AU: August 1, 2007
- Genre: Rhythm
- Modes: Single-player, multiplayer

Guitar Hero Encore: Rocks the 80s (titled Guitar Hero: Rocks the 80s in Europe) is a 2007 rhythm game developed by Harmonix and published by Activision for the PlayStation 2. It is the third installment in the Guitar Hero series. The game was released in July 2007 in North America and Europe, and in August 2007 in Australia.

Players use a guitar-shaped controller (purchased separately) to simulate playing rock music by hitting notes as they scroll towards the player. Rocks the 80s is an incremental title in the Guitar Hero series, rather than a full sequel. No changes in gameplay from Guitar Hero II have been introduced to this game. As implied by the game's title, the game features a 1980s theme, consisting of songs from the decade and playable characters, fashions, and artwork that reflect the time period.

The game was not as well-received as the prior two Guitar Hero games, due to the lack of new gameplay features and reduced soundtrack. Rocks the 80s is the third and final title in the Guitar Hero series to be developed by Harmonix before they moved on to create Rock Band. The next major installment of the series, Guitar Hero III: Legends of Rock, was developed by Activision's Neversoft division.

== History ==
After the successful release of Guitar Hero II, RedOctane announced they were looking into genre-specific expansions to the series. Guitar Hero Encore: Rocks the 80s is the first of these genre-specific titles; Guitar Hero: Aerosmith, Guitar Hero: Metallica, Guitar Hero: Van Halen and Guitar Hero Smash Hits have since been released.

Guitar Hero Encore: Rocks the 80s was initially announced by EGM in January 2007 as Guitar Hero II: 1980s Edition. Orange Lounge Radio claimed that the game would be released in June 2007, based on an Activision announcement, though no other source has cited this announcement. Activision officially revealed the first details of the game May 11, 2007, in addition to changing the game's title to Guitar Hero: Rocks the 80s. Only a few weeks later, the game name was revised again as Guitar Hero Encore: Rocks the 80s, as official artwork for the game was first released. Nevertheless, the word 'Encore' has been dropped from the title of the European releases.

== Gameplay and design ==
The mechanics of the game are nearly identical to that of its predecessor, Guitar Hero II; an early preview of the game described it as "more like an expansion pack for Guitar Hero II than a new game in its own right". Major differences to Guitar Hero II are mostly aesthetic. Six characters from previous Guitar Hero games (Johnny Napalm, Judy Nails, Izzy Sparks, Pandora, Axel Steel, and Grim Ripper) return with character designs influenced by styles of the 1980s. Venues from Guitar Hero II (with the exception of RedOctane Club and Stonehenge, which do not appear, and the Vans Warped Tour, which has been rebranded as the Rock For Safety Tour) have been redesigned with an 80s influence, and the interface mimics Guitar Hero II's, only with color changes (no "new" graphics were developed as far as the interface).

== Soundtrack ==
Screenshot showing the character Pandora in her 80s outfit.

All of the tracks, excluding "Because, It's Midnite", were released during the 1980s, as the game's title suggests; "Because, It's Midnite" is performed by the fictional "80s hair metal" band Limozeen from the Internet cartoon Homestar Runner (Harmonix co-founder/CEO Alex Rigopulos is a professed fan of Homestar Runner). Two songs were originally written in the 1970s, but were covered by bands in the 1980s. These songs are "Radar Love" by Golden Earring, but covered by White Lion and "Ballroom Blitz" by Sweet and covered by Krokus. The song list includes tracks such as "Round and Round" by Ratt, "Metal Health" by Quiet Riot, "Holy Diver" by Dio, "Heat of the Moment" by Asia and "Nothin' But a Good Time" by Poison. Five of the songs are master tracks: "Because It's Midnite", "I Ran (So Far Away)" by A Flock of Seagulls, Scandal's "The Warrior", Twisted Sister's "I Wanna Rock", and Judas Priest's "Electric Eye", while the rest are covers.

The final setlist was revealed by GameSpy on June 28, 2007. Unlike previous Guitar Hero games, there are no bonus tracks in Guitar Hero Encore: Rocks the 80s. Bow Wow Wow's "I Want Candy" was originally announced for the game and appeared in many preview builds. However, RedOctane announced that it would no longer appear in the final version. No official comment in regards to the song's removal was given.

Year	Song title	Artist	Master recording?	Tier
1989	"18 and Life"	Skid Row	No	1. Opening Licks; Encore
1988	"Ain't Nothin' But a Good Time"^{c}	Poison	No	5. Relentless Riffs
1984	"Ballroom Blitz"^{e}	Krokus	No	4. Return of the Shred
1984	"Balls to the Wall"	Accept	No	1. Opening Licks
1983	"(Bang Your Head) Metal Health"	Quiet Riot	No	1. Opening Licks
1987	"Bathroom Wall"	Faster Pussycat	No	5. Relentless Riffs
2003^{a}	"Because, It's Midnite"	Limozeen	Yes	2. Amp Warmers; Encore
1987	"Caught in a Mosh"	Anthrax	No	6. Furious Fretwork
1982	"Electric Eye"^{b}	Judas Priest	Yes	6. Furious Fretwork
1982	"Heat of the Moment"	Asia	No	2. Amp Warmers
1981	"Hold on Loosely"	.38 Special	No	3. String Snappers
1983	"Holy Diver"	Dio	No	3. String Snappers
1982	"I Ran (So Far Away)"	A Flock of Seagulls	Yes	1. Opening Licks
1984	"I Wanna Rock"	Twisted Sister	Yes^{d}	3. String Snappers; Encore
1981	"Lonely Is the Night"	Billy Squier	No	5. Relentless Riffs
1980	"Los Angeles"	X	No	5. Relentless Riffs
1982	"No One Like You"	Scorpions	No	2. Amp Warmers
1981	"Only a Lad"	Oingo Boingo	No	4. Return of the Shred
1989	"Play with Me"	Extreme	No	6. Furious Fretwork; Encore
1980	"Police Truck"	Dead Kennedys	No	6. Furious Fretwork
1989	"Radar Love"^{f}	White Lion	No	2. Amp Warmers
1984	"Round and Round"	Ratt	No	4. Return of the Shred; Encore
1988	"Seventeen"	Winger	No	6. Furious Fretwork
1982	"Shakin'"	Eddie Money	No	2. Amp Warmers
1983	"Synchronicity II"	The Police	No	4. Return of the Shred
1980	"Turning Japanese"	The Vapors	No	3. String Snappers
1984	"The Warrior"	Scandal	Yes	3. String Snappers
1982	"We Got the Beat"	The Go-Go's	No	1. Opening Licks
1980	"What I Like About You"	The Romantics	No	4. Return of the Shred
1981	"Wrathchild"	Iron Maiden	No	5. Relentless Riffs; Encore

^aLimozeen is a fictional 80s glam metal band featured in the Homestar Runner series of web cartoons; while the song was created in 2003, it parodies the style of these bands.

^bJudas Priest's "Electric Eye" includes "The Hellion", the preceding track on the Screaming for Vengeance album that segues right into "Electric Eye".

^cPoison's "Nothin' But a Good Time" is labeled in game as "Ain't Nothin' But a Good Time".

^dTwisted Sister's "I Wanna Rock" is featured as a re-recorded master track of the song, not the original album version.

^eThe original version of "Ballroom Blitz" was recorded by the band Sweet and was actually released in 1973.

^fThe original version of "Radar Love" was recorded by the band Golden Earring and was actually released in 1973.

== Reception ==
Reviews
Publication	Score
1UP.com	B
Game Informer	8.25/10
GameSpot	7.0/10
IGN	7.2/10
Electronic Gaming Monthly	7.5/10 - 6.0/10 - 6.0/10
Compilation review site	Aggregate score
GameRankings	71% (based on 31 reviews)
Metacritic	69% (based on 32 reviews)

Guitar Hero Encore: Rocks the 80s was released to generally lukewarm reviews and has received overall less praise than the first two games in the series. Most critics agreed that the game's $49.99 price point was too high, considering the reduced soundtrack. GameSpot criticized the number of songs with regard to the game's price. The reviewer commented that "thirty songs for $50 is a lousy value any way you slice it" and the game "feels like a quick and dirty cash-in." The reviewer also commented that the soundtrack was "eclectic," but "solid." Other reviewers, including 1UP.com, IGN, and Electronic Gaming Monthly criticized the game for its musical selection. GameSetWatch compared the game to Lou Reed's Metal Machine Music, saying that the game is "totally Harmonix's contractual obligation game" due to the bare minimum of changes made from Guitar Hero II.

=== Lawsuit ===
On November 21, 2007, the rock group The Romantics filed a lawsuit against Activision, RedOctane, Harmonix, and Wavegroup Sound over the cover of the song "What I Like About You" used in Rocks the 80s. While the game developers did secure appropriate rights to cover the song in the game, The Romantics claim that the cover is "virtually indistinguishable from the authentic version" and thus would "[confuse] consumers into believing that the band actually recorded the music and endorsed the product". The lawsuit requested the cessation of sales of the game and monetary damage. On December 20, 2007, Activision was awarded a preliminary injunction to prevent blockage of sales of the game. A summary judgment hearing was held on July 9, 2008, and the case was dismissed the next month, with a U.S. District Court judge stating that Activision had obtained the proper licensing for the works and that the band itself no longer held the copyright on the work.
