= Two More Eggs =

American animated sketch comedy web series

- Genre: Sketch comedy; Surreal humour
- Created by: The Brothers Chaps
- Directed by: The Brothers Chaps
- Voices of: Mike Chapman; Matt Chapman
- Country of origin: United States
- Original language: English
- No. of seasons: 3
- No. of episodes: 90

Production
- Running time: 1-3 minutes
- Production companies: Citywide Hoop Champs Inc. Disney Television Animation

Original release
- Network: Disney XD; YouTube
- Release: June 23, 2015 – September 4, 2017

Related
- Homestar Runner

Two More Eggs is an American animated sketch comedy web series produced by The Brothers Chaps for Disney XD's YouTube channel and Disney XD. The Brothers Chaps are more well-known for producing the web series Homestar Runner.

The series debuted on June 23, 2015 with the release of the first three episodes, a trailer, and an announcement that new episodes would be released on Tuesdays. Mostly over a minute long, each episode centers on an individual character (e.g., "Dooble" or "Hot Dip") or a group of characters (e.g., "CGI Palz" or "Hector & Kovitch" or "Trauncles") and has no overarching plot or complexity. Matt Chapman claims that he and Mike worked with Disney with the same autonomy as with Homestar Runner.

Two More Eggs was renewed for a second season in March 2016, which premiered on June 13, 2016. In August 2017, it was renewed for a third and final season, which premiered on August 21, 2017. No more episodes have been produced since then.

== Series featured on Two More Eggs ==
- The Brum-Dumpulous Craz-ventures of Dooble: A potbellied man embarks on several misadventures, whether he knows it or not. Dooble is also the main character in his own video game.
- Eggpo: In Dooble's video game, a newly hired eggpo learns the ins-and-outs of being a generic enemy, even if that means breaking the rules.
- CGI Palz: A supposed TV show all about the wonders of being computer-generated. CGI Palz is a parody of 1990s computer animation, which was popular at the time.
- Trauncles: A parody of soft-spoken British children's programs (e.g., Postman Pat, Paddington and Bod), which is set in the titular town of Trauncles.
- Hector & Kovitch: Two friends discuss some of their favorite things. This was the only sketch to appear in every season of the series.
- Hot Dip: A cool dip mascot helps a kid named Hayden with the challenges of teen social life, with less than useful results.
- Bad Snaxx: A working mom shares her "food hacks" with the world, no matter how disgusting they are. This sketch was exclusive to Season 1
- "The" JoƧHŏw Show!!!!!!!!!!!!!!: A parody of DIY YouTube channels. A recently unemployed dad shows off his crafting skills, much to the embarrassment of his son.
- Gankroar: A series of commercials for the titular toy robot and his furry alien pal named Cheeby. This sketch was exclusive to Season 1
- New4Mobile: A series of very vague infomercials about a new service for a mobile phone. This sketch debuted in Season 2
- Poach & Scramble: Two eggs who have the ability to sing and dance. This sketch debuted in Season 2
- Hot Diggity: A parody of edutainment TV shows from the 1980s and 1990s. This sketch debuted in Season 2
- Parental Notice: A parody of parental notices that are shown before Preschool shows.
- Street Road Junction: A supposed TV show about anthropomorphic roads. This sketch debuted in Season 2
- Panda Bractice: An all-girl RV band who are trying to be famous. This sketch debuted in Season 3
- And some one-off shorts: Cutesycorns, Knight Bit, Francis Sweetmouth, Qblepon, World's Best, TurchKid03, Beef Stroganauts, and Grown-Ups Made Up By Kids.

== Episodes ==
=== Season 1 (2015–16) ===
Date	Episode #	Title	Length	YouTube description
August 10, 2015	1	"Dooble: Dooblie Doo"	1:12	Dooble sings his signature theme song while exploring the world and going on many fun boxes. His life is a joy box!
August 17, 2015	2	"CGI Palz: Theme Song"	1:17	A theme song introducing the CGI Palz – a group of computer-animated friends who showcase the unlimited qualities of being computer-animated.
August 24, 2015	3	"Hot Dip: Not 4 Momz!"	1:26	A commercial parody showcasing Hot Dip – the questionably edible product and awesome friend you need in life – but remember, it's "Not 4 Momz!"
August 31, 2015	4	"Dooble: Video Game"	1:41	Dooble is the hero of his very own 8-bit video game, taking on all villains and challenges as he masters the first level. Press start!
September 7, 2015	5	"Eggpo: New Job"	1:11	An enthusiastic new Eggpo minion discovers what really happens in the video game world on his first day. He's in for a real surprise! Follow the continuing adventures of Dooble Dooblie Doo!
September 14, 2015	6	"Trauncles: Sharing"	1:46	Welcome to Trauncles, a little town just like yours and mine, where the people have lots to not really teach us. In this episode, we get to meet Stevens and Jordy as they explore the meaning of sharing... sort of.
September 28, 2015	7	"Dooble: The Driver"	1:41	Dooble is hired as a driver to deliver a mysterious package. But when the heat is on, he throws his best dance party at it!
October 5, 2015	8	"Hector & Kovitch: Best Movie"	1:45	Hector and Kovitch are two kids who love talking about their favorite things all the time. Movies, video games, fireworks, and everything in between.
October 12, 2015	9	"Trauncles: Trousers"	1:40	In this very special episode of Trauncles, there comes a time in every boy's life when he gets his first pair of trousers, and Jordy is about to get his.
October 19, 2015	10	"Dooble: Cake Show"	1:45	Everyone's favorite pot-bellied traveler is helping make dreams come true as the guest chef on a reality baking show. Can you see him now?
October 26, 2015	11	"Bad Snaxx: Breakfast"	1:30	A working mom shares her quick n' easy breakfast hacks for the family. Hey, that could be a blog!
December 7, 2015	12	"CGI Palz: Grossface"	1:38	A visit from their 2D neighbor Grossface leaves one of the Palz in danger of losing her CG.
November 23, 2015	13	"Hot Dip: Sitcom"	1:48	Hot Dip helps Hayden with the challenges of teen social life, because everything is possible with enough Hot Dip!
September 8, 2015	14	"Trauncles: Sweethearts"	1:48	In this episode of Trauncles, the narrator deals with his relationship issues while checking in on the townsfolk and their sweethearts.
November 9, 2015	15	"Dooble: The Interview"	1:38	Dooble brings his unique skills to the corporate interview process, including impressively folding meatloaf.
November 2, 2015	16	"Eggpo: Waiting"	1:13	New Eggpo learns the fine monotonous art of shooting mouth fireballs and the surprise reward for hitting your target.
September 29, 2015	17	"Trauncles: Beans"	1:38	In today's episode of Trauncles, the greatest mystery to ever befall the little town. Who stole all the beans!?
November 16, 2015	18	"Dooble: Peas and Corn"	1:38	Dooble makes it his mission to turn one lowly can of peas-and-corn into the hero of the supermarket!
US: October 13, 2015; UK: November 28, 2015	19	"Hector & Kovitch: Buy This Game"; US Version; UK Version	1:14	US: "Hector tries to convince Kovitch to buy a really cool video game, while also trying to guess his name." UK: "I think you should go and buy that game Kovitch..."
November 30, 2015	20	"Trauncles: Not Done"	1:23	In this never ending intro to somewhat of an episode of Trauncles, we visit some of the many places and things that make up the town.
December 14, 2015	21	"Dooble: Newscarsting"	1:38	Dooble takes news anchoring to the next level with a hard-hitting scoop on cereal boxes.
December 21, 2015	22	"Bad Snaxx: After School"	1:38	Everyone's favorite working mom and blog host shares some pro tips for snack hacks for the pesky minutes between real meals.
December 28, 2015	23	"Hot Dip: Learn 2 Talk"	1:42	Do you have trouble communicating? Hot Dip has some hot tips for talking all good in any situation.
January 4, 2016	24	"Joshow Show: Tape and Staple T-Rex"	1:48	A dad with a lot of time on his hands shares his crafts skills with the world by making a T-Rex with just tape and staples!
January 11, 2016	25	"CGI Palz: Ry Raw"	1:32	The Palz must all work together to try and figure what The Lenore Street Bridge is saying before it is too late.
January 18, 2016	26	"Eggpo: Mini-Boss"	1:38	New Eggpo learns the hard lessons of rising too far too fast from the minion ranks in a world of bosses and mini-bosses.
January 25, 2016	27	"Gankroar: Backyard"	1:16	Gankroar and Chibi take their epic adventures to an upscale backyard in a strange new world only to discover that not all is what it seems.
February 1, 2016	28	"Dooble: Shark Baby"	1:09	When a great white shark is about to give birth, Dr. Dooble answers the call.
February 8, 2016	29	"Hector & Kovitch: QblePon"	1:49	Hector recounts the most epic game of QblePon ever played, because we can all agree it's the best game.
February 15, 2016	30	"Hot Dip: Jamers"	1:45	Relationships get complicated when Hayden finds Hot Dip helping out another kid.
February 22, 2016	31	"Eggpo: Joyride"	1:33	New Eggpo can't resist the allure of a joybox, but he and his more seasoned co-worker might have gotten more than they bargained for this time.
February 29, 2016	32	"Joshow Show: Crackergami"	1:34	Joshow takes the ancient art of origami to a whole new level by incorporating one of the world's most versatile snacks - the cracker!
March 7, 2016	33	"Gankroar: Action Poses"	1:15	Gankroar takes being Guardian of the Klanktor to the next level with a new action and accessories playset.
March 14, 2016	34	"Dooble: Cutesycorns"	1:53	When Dooble wanders into the world of the Cutesycorns, a misunderstanding of who's who leads to potential disaster.
March 21, 2016	35	"Trauncles: Ridonkles"	1:10	The quaint world of Trauncles gets turned upside down when things get utterly ridonkles!
March 28, 2016	36	"CGI Palz: Glitching Out"	1:31	The Palz explore the fun of “glitching out” but may have taken it way too far!
April 4, 2016	37	"Eggpo: Instruction Book"	1:40	New Eggpo explores the instruction booklet and discovers all the hot tips, tricks, and cheat codes that Dooble 2 has to offer.
April 11, 2016	38	"Joshow Show: Drum Set"	1:40	Joshow demonstrates how to take useless cups and turn them into an instrument worthy of a world class drummer.
April 18, 2016	39	"Parental Notice: Jamble Bears"	1:15	Come join the Jamble Bears as they teach your kids all kinds of important life lessons and other things.
April 25, 2016	40	"Hector and Kovitch: Brown Boats"	1:35	The trailer for the epic movie that the whole world has been waiting for..."Brown Boats.".

=== Season 2 (2016) ===
Date	Episode #	Title	Length	YouTube Description
June 13, 2016	41	"Hot Diggity: Theme Song"	1:26	Come join Dr. Diggity as he explores the amazing world of Science and Math and Mathence!
September 5, 2016	42	"Hector & Kovitch: Zooms"	1:58	While sharing his recent experience with a roller-coaster, Hector stumbles upon a term that might change roller-coastering as we know it 4eva!
June 13, 2016	43	"Dooble: She Whispered"	1:43	Dooble helps spice up the acoustic ballad "She Whispered" from the world-famous band Beard-Antler.
June 16, 2016	44	"Knight Bit: Dragon"	1:53	In this 8-bit adventure, a princess knight will stop at nothing to be reunited with her best friend horse. That's a good story, right?
June 18, 2016	45	"New4Mobile: Commercial"	1:18	Check out the hottest new app on the market! Do you like dining in or mega blasts? Do you want to stay in touch with the kids or customize stuff? Streaming data rates apply!
June 21, 2016	46	"Trauncles: Gram Moody"	1:48	In this episode, we meet many of the town's very special residents and get to spend some time with Gram Moody. Anyone want a slice of pie?
June 23, 2016	47	"Francis Sweetmouth: Why Did You Take My Paste?"	1:40	Let everyone's favorite hamster, Francis Sweetmouth, serenade you while also taking to heart the important message about a problem that affects us all, adhesive theft.
October 10, 2016	48	"Dooble: Masks"	1:26	The international man of mystery Dooble shows off his many faces.
June 28, 2016	49	"CGI Palz: CG-Rom"	1:48	Interact like never before with the CGI Palz in their new game, using all your mouse-clicking skills to help navigate the Palz through a series of very challenging problems.
June 30, 2016	50	"Hector & Kovitch: Basknetball"	1:50	It's the first day of basknetball practice and Hector and Kovitch are sharing top maneuvers and things you would never expect.
November 1, 2016	51	"Poach & Scramble: Today's Special"	1:12	Everyone's favorite dancing eggs, Poach and Scramble, are back... and this time they are dancing for their lives.
July 5, 2016	52	"New4Mobile: Customer Service"	1:49	You have questions or problems? Having a party on Friday? Try giving New 4 Mobile customer service a call.
July 7, 2016	53	"Trauncles: Opposites"	1:51	In this episode of Trauncles, we explore the magic and wonder of things that are opposites.
July 9, 2016	54	"Dooble: Renfrow"	2:15	The epic standoff that you never saw coming and clearly never asked for...Dooble vs. Renfrow.
July 12, 2016	55	"Hot Dip: End Game"	1:57	Hayden is having a lot of trouble in the new post-apocalyptic world and must team up with his old friend Hot Dip to solve a mystery.
July 14, 2016	56	"Hot Diggity: Science Proof"	1:50	Come join Dr. Diggity as he goes deeper into science than anyone has ever gone before! (Disney XD Description)
July 16, 2016	57	"Trauncles: Trauncles 2000"	1:57	This is the Trauncles of the future, but not the Trauncles that you remember. (Disney XD Description)
November 1, 2016	58	"Eggpo: Mobile App"	1:43	New Eggpo shows Old Timer the joys and dangers of being in a very different kind of video game.
November 3, 2016	59	"Qblepon: Original 90s"	1:53	Everyone's favorite card game, QblePon, now has its very own TV show. You know you want to look at them!
November 5, 2016	60	"New4Mobile: Dooble"	1:59	Dooble turns to everyone's favorite app helpline when he can't find the love of his life...his Debra.
November 8, 2016	61	"Hector & Kovitch: School Lunches"	1:51	Hector shares his passion and excitement for school lunch while trying to uncover Kovitch's favorite foods.
November 10, 2016	62	"Poach & Scramble: Challengers"	1:16	Everyone's favorite dancing eggs meet their match on the dance counter. Will they have the yolk to stand up to the challenge, or will they crack under the pressure?
November 12, 2016	63	"Hot Diggity: Internet"	1:48	Come join Dr. Diggity as he solves the mystery of where the internet came from.
November 15, 2016	64	"Trauncles: Trauncles by You"	1:59	A look into the merciless scrutiny that results when fan mail makes it to its end destination.
November 17, 2016	65	"Street Road Junction: The Pilot"	1:29	Do you love talking animals, talking cars, talking planes and talking boats? Then you are in for a treat as we enter the world of Street Road Junction, where streets talk!
November 19, 2016	66	"Eggpo: Speedrun"	2:15	Watch as Turchkid03 attempts to break the "Dooble 2" video game record. But will he be helped or thwarted by everyone's favorite Eggpos, New Guy and Old Guy?
November 22, 2016	67	"Parental Notice: Two More Eggs"	1:41	Get all the info you need to justify why the amazing shows from the Two More Eggs Universe are just right for your little such and such.
November 24, 2016	68	"World's Best: Tiny Pies"	2:39	Watch as the "World's Best" DIY specialists take on everything from being doctors to baking tiny pies. You won't believe what's next.
January 30, 2017	69	"Joshow: Click on My Ads"	1:55	Joshow needs to make sure that his show makes money by turning his ads into a fun song!
November 29, 2016	70	"Poach & Scramble: Egg Monster"	1:15	What happens to Poach and Scramble when you combine a Frankensteinian friend, a synchronized dance party and a formidable foe?
December 1, 2016	71	"Hot Diggity: Photosynthesis"	1:26	Pizza is everyone's favorite food right? Well not plants, so if plants don't eat pizza what do they eat...well come with me and find out. Science!
December 2, 2016	72	"TurchKid03: Oh My Word"	1:40	This week TurchKid03 will bring his undeniable charisma to the world of corn food snacks and will also tease his next great digital adventure, Gankroar Online.
December 6, 2016	73	"CutesyCorns: The One Where..."	2:13	Penguin always thinks he knows exactly what is going to happen next. But will Penguin lead the CutesyCorns to safety or will his carefree attitude finally catch up with him?
December 8, 2016	74	"Beef Stroganauts: Action Fill-gures"	1:15	The Stroganauts need your help! Join the adventures with new “Action Fill-gures,” now with 3 delicious options to make your transition from playtime to dinner easier than ever.
December 10, 2016	75	"Street Road Junction: New Road"	1:49	Come see what happens when everyone's favorite SUPER AWESOME HERO, Dooble, visits everyone's favorite world of talking streets.
December 21, 2016	76	"Dooble: Take a Right"	1:45	Dooble takes everyone's favorite cabbie, Stevie Twicetimes, on a ride he won't ever forget.
December 21, 2016	77	"CGI Palz: Bedtime"	2:03	Everywhere you look and everything you touch is 3D, but it wasn't always that way. Now come join the CGI Palz as Arlington tells the story of the first CGI character...Lermy.
December 21, 2016	78	"Dooble: Game Show"	1:54	Dooble is back and this time he has a chance to be the BIG WINNER! Will there be huge prizes? Will there be suspense? You'll have to tune in to find out.
December 21, 2016	79	"Grown Ups Made Up By Kids"	1:24	What if kids were responsible for making up grownups? Who would those grownups be, what would define them? Come and find out the answer to those questions and maybe others!
December 21, 2016	80	"Hot Dip: End Game Part II"	2:08	Watch as Hot Dip and Hayden discover the magic we all have inside of us and use it to reclaim a world stolen when Hayden's mom does the unthinkable and starts hot dipping.

=== Season 3 (2017) ===
Date	Episode #	Title	Length	YouTube Description
August 21, 2017	81	"Hector & Kovitch: Bus Ride"	2:12	On the Bus ride home from school, Hector announces what is going to make this Friday night the most amazing one yet.
August 21, 2017	82	"Hector & Kovitch: Basement"	2:22	After Kovitch realizes it is her house that Hector is sleeping over at, she is left wondering if this is something she actually wants.
August 21, 2017	83	"Hector & Kovitch: Dinner"	2:34	Hector is having a wonderful dinner with Kovitch and her family until he finds out they don't have dessert. What will Hector do to save the day?
August 21, 2017	84	"Hector & Kovitch: Bedtime"	2:30	Hector and Kovitch discuss what the world might look like after midnight as they attempt to stay up later than ever before.
August 21, 2017	85	"Hector & Kovitch: Breakfast"	2:08	Hector meets Kovich's dad and tries to figure out what he is making for breakfast.
September 4, 2017	86	"Panda Bractice: Band Name"	2:27	Libby, Glennis and Marta are three little girls with a dream, a dream to rock. Now that they have decided to be a band all they need is the right band name.
September 4, 2017	87	"Panda Bractice: Fans"	2:59	The ladies of Panda Bractice love to jam but what is the point of being in a band if you don't have a #1 fan that is also human?
September 4, 2017	88	"Panda Bractice: Band Logo"	2:55	The band has a name, the band has a fan, now all that Panda Bractice needs is a memorable logo so they can start getting their "Merch" out in the world.
September 4, 2017	89	"Panda Bractice: Interview"	3:33	The girls of Panda Bractice begin the promotional tour for their upcoming 1st show by stopping by the local radio station for an interview.
September 4, 2017	90	"Panda Bractice: Reunion"	3:50	Can Panda Bractice get over their musical differences and come together to save the one thing they love most, the Sun Chaser?

== See also ==
- Homestar Runner
