= Strong Bad's Cool Game for Attractive People =

2008 video game

- Developer: Telltale Games
- Publisher: Telltale Games
- Directors: Mark Darin; Chuck Jordan; Mike Stemmle
- Producer: Dave Felton
- Designers: Mark Darin; Mike Stemmle; Chuck Jordan; Brendan Ferguson; Jake Rodkin
- Programmers: Charlie Smith; John Drake; Andrew Langley; Randy Tudor; John "Seg" Seggerson; Carlo Morgantini; Tulley Rafferty; Chuck Jordan; Mike Stemmle; Robert Oates; Mark Darin
- Artists: Mai Nguyen; Jonathan Sgro; David Bogan
- Writers: Mike Stemmle; Matt Chapman; Mike Chapman; Chuck Jordan; Mark Darin
- Composers: Matt Chapman; Mike Chapman; Jared Emerson-Johnson; Jonathan Howe
- Series: Homestar Runner
- Engine: Telltale Tool
- Platforms: Microsoft Windows; Wii; PlayStation 3; OS X
- Release: Episode 1: WW: August 11, 2008 (PC); NA: August 11, 2008 (Wii); EU: August 15, 2008 (Wii); Episode 2: WW: September 15, 2008 (PC); NA: September 15, 2008 (Wii); EU: September 26, 2008 (Wii); Episode 3: WW: October 27, 2008 (PC); NA: October 27, 2008 (Wii); EU: November 21, 2008 (Wii); Episode 4: WW: November 17, 2008 (PC); NA: November 17, 2008 (Wii); EU: December 4, 2008 (Wii); Episode 5: WW: December 15, 2008 (PC); NA: December 15, 2008 (Wii); EU: January 2, 2009 (Wii); Complete pack: WW: December 18, 2008 (PC: Steam); NA: July 2, 2009 (PC: Retail); NA: December 21, 2010 (PS3); WW: January 13, 2011 (OS X); EU: March 23, 2011 (PS3)
- Genre: Graphic adventure
- Mode: Single-player

Strong Bad's Cool Game for Attractive People is a 2008 episodic graphic adventure developed by Telltale Games and based on the Homestar Runner web cartoon, with Strong Bad as the lead character. A total of five episodes were released for Microsoft Windows and WiiWare between August 11, 2008, and December 15, 2008. It was released on the PlayStation 3 in North America on December 21, 2010, and in other regions at a later time. There is also an OS X version.

The game was removed from Steam before June 1, 2023, after LCG Entertainment lost the rights to the intellectual property.

== Gameplay ==
Strong Bad's Cool Game for Attractive People uses point and click mechanics. The player plays as Strong Bad, one of the most popular characters in the Homestar Runner online Flash animation series, as he goes through his life, interacting with characters. Each game contains a different goal that the player must reach by talking to characters and using items.

Apart from the point and click mechanics, each episode features an arcade-style minigame. For example, the first episode features a top-down boxing game called Snake Boxer 5. Other features include a customizable map, hidden and collectible items such as 3×5 cards used to create Teen Girl Squad comics, and the ability to take pictures to send to friends through WiiConnect24 or by e-mail (depending on the version used).

== Episodes ==
Episode	Release date
Episode 1 – "Homestar Ruiner"	August 11, 2008
Strong Bad receives an email suggesting he "beat the snot out of" his long-time rival Homestar Runner. When he gets there, however, he discovers Homestar has entered the Free Country USA Tri-annual Race to the End of the Race, and decides it would be even more fun to beat Homestar at his own game than to simply beat him up. He disguises himself as Homestar, keeps him distracted away from the race, and loses the race. The resulting chaos turns Homestar into a loser, earns him a criminal record, and makes his girlfriend Marzipan break up with him. Though Strong Bad is initially proud of himself for ruining Homestar's life, these efforts backfire when Homestar moves into Strong Bad's house, believing him to be "the only friend I've got". In an attempt to get Homestar out of his house, Strong Bad must undo the harm he did to Homestar's life. Homestar Ruiner also includes a minigame, Snake Boxer 5, a parody of the Atari 2600 game Boxing that sees the player controlling a boxer named Boxer Joe from a top down perspective as he battles round after round of snakes in a boxing ring.
Episode 2 – "Strong Badia the Free"	September 15, 2008
As the episode begins, The King of Town institutes an e-mail tax. Strong Bad is the most heavily affected. However, being unaware of the existence of the tax, he is put under house arrest (with an explosive collar around his neck), a predicament that leads him to unite the citizens to rise up against the authorities. Strong Bad then declares his own plot of land (an empty lot featuring a fence, a spare tire, and a graffiti'd stop sign, which Strong Bad has named "Strong Badia") an independent nation. The inspirational speech he gives to the citizens inspires them to create their own independent countries. In order to overthrow the King of Town, Strong Bad must work his way through the countries and unite Free Country USA once again under the Strong Badian flag. Strong Badia the Free's minigame, Math Kickers: Featuring the Algebros, a parody of beat 'em ups such as Double Dragon, involves the player solving math problems by punching enemies. In addition, the game also features a second minigame called Maps & Minions.
Episode 3 – "Baddest of the Bands"	October 27, 2008
As the game opens, Strong Bad's FunMachine (an Atari 2600–like video game system) suddenly breaks. Strong Bad does not have the money to get it fixed, however. In an attempt to get money, he organizes a Battle Royale of the Bands, complete with local bands and celebrity guest stars—the 80's hair band Limozeen. When this still does not cover the fee, Strong Bad is forced to compete with his own rock band and claim the cash prize.
Episode 4 – "Dangeresque 3: The Criminal Projective"	November 17, 2008
This episode gets its scenario from an in-joke in the website. The episode is actually the "film" Dangeresque 3. Strong Bad has finally finished his long-awaited film and invites his friends over to his basement for the film's premiere. The player then assumes the role of Dangeresque, embracing the cliches and tropes of the action film genre, with the movie looking like a very low-budget film.
Episode 5 – "8-Bit is Enough"	December 15, 2008
The story begins at the end of episode 4, when Strong Bad jumps off of the couch and hits the Trogdor arcade machine. The Trogdor arcade machine grows an arm, legs and wings and comes to life. Strong Sad claims that Strong Bad damaged the 8-bit containment field and needs to order a replacement. Sadly, through an odd series of events, the containment field is broken, resulting in the world of video games and the world of Free Country USA combining. Video game elements and characters begin invading the real world, and vice versa. In the ensuing chaos, Trogdor escapes his game and "burninates" Strong Badia. Strong Bad must defeat his fiery creation once and for all, by getting party members from other games to advance to the dungeon of the beast and restore balance between the two worlds.

== Development ==
The Homestar Runner website included several browser-based Flash games; these simple games were typically developed by Homestar co-creators Mike and Matt Chapman, collectively known as The Brothers Chaps. Although the brothers had been approached by other game companies in the past, including Sega of America, they had rejected such offers out of concerns that their characters would not be properly understood or represented.

Telltale Games sent an email to the contact address listed on homestarrunner.com, expressing a desire to work together. Familiar with Telltale employees' former work on LucasArts adventure games, and already playing through Sam & Max: Season One, the brothers considered Telltale "a perfect pairing." Additionally, the website's format of short, episodic cartoons could be effectively captured by both the episodic release schedule and the small file size of the WiiWare format. The partnership with Telltale Games was the first time The Brothers Chaps had licensed out Homestar Runner.

The series was first hinted at in a Homestar Runner short called "Strong Bad Gameways", posted on YouTube and accessible from a hidden link on the site, a parody of pre-flight safety demonstrations with the Wii Remote. The game itself was officially announced on April 10, 2008 in a press release from Telltale Games. The press release presented the game as a collaborative effort between Telltale Games and Videlectrix, a fictional company from Homestar Runner.

The game being promoted at PAX West in 2008.

As described by the Brothers Chaps and Telltale lead designer Mark Darin, the writing process was highly collaborative. Email correspondence and conference calls were used to brainstorm the plots of the episodes, and scripts were sent to the brothers for approval and to "review, edit and rewrite whatever feels necessary to make the whole thing feel more 'Strong Bad-y'." Even when recording dialog, which was done at the Chaps' office, there was still freedom to rewrite and improvise to maintain the feeling of the cartoons.

== Reception ==
Aggregate review scores
Game	GameRankings	Metacritic
Episode 1 – Homestar Ruiner	(Wii) 76.76% (PC) 73.33%	(Wii) 76 (PC) 73
Episode 2 – Strong Badia the Free	(PC) 80.46% (Wii) 79.36%	(Wii) 82 (PC) 81
Episode 3 – Baddest of the Bands	(PC) 79.64% (Wii) 78.82%	(PC) 79 (Wii) 79
Episode 4 – Dangeresque 3: The Criminal Projective	(PC) 82.68% (Wii) 81.23%	(PC) 81 (Wii) 81
Episode 5 – 8-Bit is Enough	(Wii) 84.62% (PC) 83.86%	(Wii) 83 (PC) 82

=== Episode 1 – Homestar Ruiner ===
Episode 1 – Homestar Ruiner received moderately positive reviews. Aggregating review websites GameRankings and Metacritic gave the Wii version 76.76% and 76/100 and the PC version 73.33% and 73/100. IGN gave the game an 8.1 out of 10, with the authentic presentation, voice work, music and the opening song impressing them the most. They also believed the game to be a must download for fans, but felt that the experience was short-lived and did not break any new ground for the genre. In contrast, GameSpot believed the cartoon's humor did not translate well to an adventure game, and gave it a 5/10. ONM gave it 88%, naming it one of the best WiiWare games so far, but that the humour in it isn't for everyone. It was awarded Best Voice Acting for the Wii by IGN in its 2008 video game awards IGN also made it a nominee for Best Story and Best WiiWare Game., this is the only Episode to be rated T.

=== Episode 2 – Strong Badia the Free ===
Episode 2 – Strong Badia the Free received positive reviews. Aggregating review websites GameRankings and Metacritic gave the PC version 80.46% and 81/100 and the Wii version 79.36% and 82/100. IGN, which gave the game 8.2/10, echoed their assessment from their Homestar Ruiner review, noting the game to be slightly longer and more complete than its predecessor, yet still geared very much towards fans. GameSpot, who disliked the first episode, gave Strong Badia the Free a 7.0/10, believing the game was a marked improvement with a more linear and original plot, and funnier jokes they felt did not need to prop up the weak gameplay noted in its predecessor. ONM gave it 86%, saying that although it was longer and funnier, the strategy at the end is weak resulting in a lower score. However, the episode did garner the best reception out of the five.

=== Episode 3 – Baddest of the Bands ===
Episode 3 – Baddest of the Bands received positive reviews. Aggregating review websites GameRankings and Metacritic gave the PC version 79.64% and 79/100 and the Wii version 78.82% and 79/100. IGN gave it 8.4/10, claiming it has "the best puzzles our hero has encountered yet" as well as "the best Strong Bad mini-game so far". WiiWare World gave the game 7 out of 10, commenting that while the series continues to appeal to fans of previous episodes, it does not offer anything for new players.

=== Episode 4 – Dangeresque 3: The Criminal Projective ===
Episode 4 – Dangeresque 3: The Criminal Projective received positive reviews. Aggregating review websites GameRankings and Metacritic gave the PC version 82.68% and 81/100 and the Wii version 81.23% and 81/100. Nintendo Life gave the game 8 out of 10. They called the game 'easily the best episode yet' and hoped the series finale would be even better. IGN gave the game an 8.5/10, again praising Matt Chapman's voice work and the music as well, which they stated was "a little more ambitious than the other episodes."

=== Episode 5 – 8-Bit is Enough ===
Episode 5 – 8-Bit is Enough received positive reviews. Aggregating review websites GameRankings and Metacritic gave the Wii version 84.62% and 83/100 and the PC version 83.86% and 82/100.
