= The Brothers Chaps =

American writers, voice actors, directors, producers, and composers

Matt and Mike Chapman
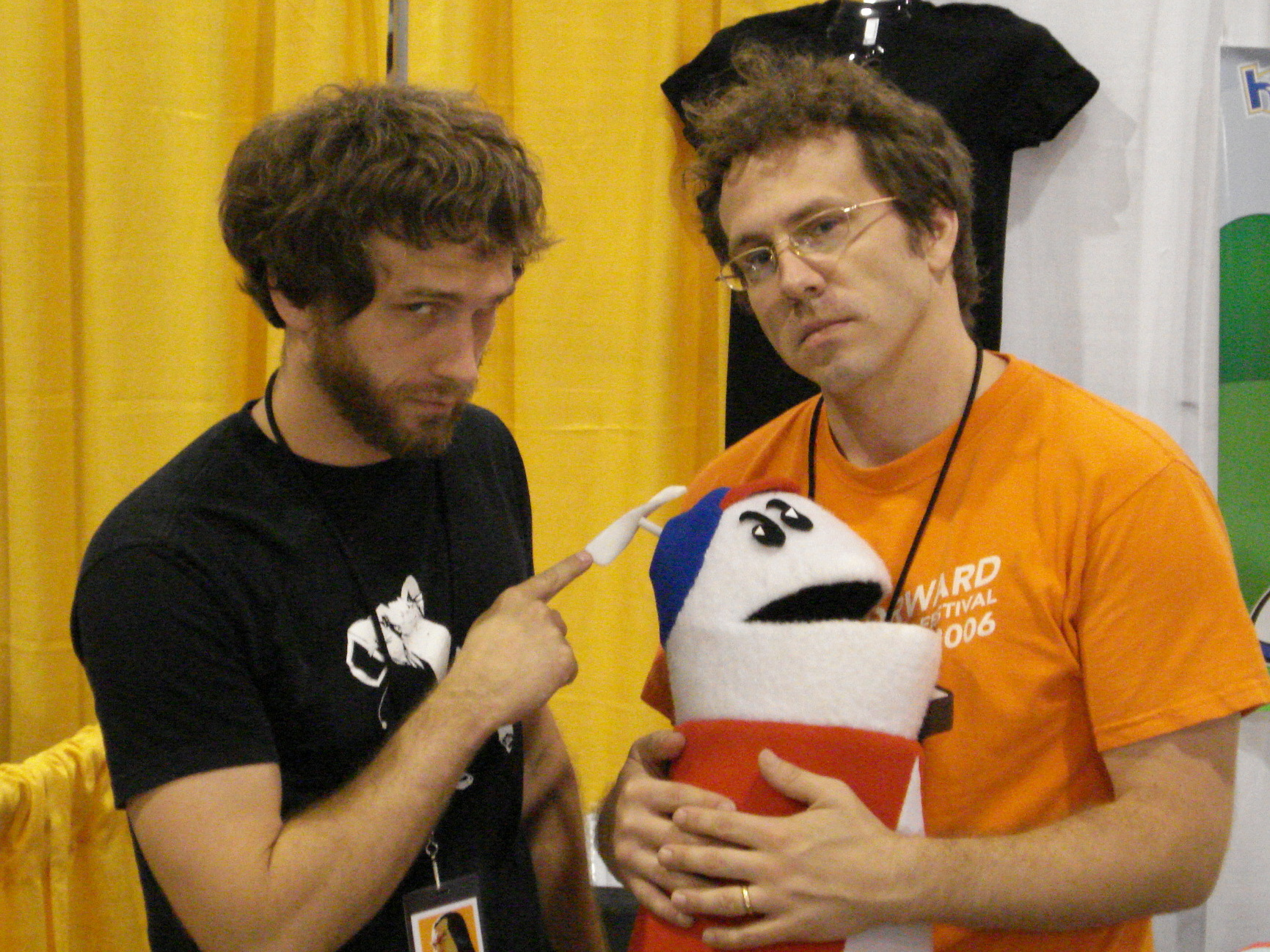
- Matt (left) and Mike Chapman at the 2008 Heroes Convention
- Born: Matthew Alan Chapman; November 1, 1976 (age 49) Michael Raymond Chapman; September 20, 1973 (age 53); Indiana, U.S. (both)
- Other name: The Brothers Chaps
- Occupations: Writers; voice actors; directors; animators; producers; composers
- Years active: 1996–present
- Spouse(s): Matt: Jackie Chapman Mike: Missy Palmer (m. 2004)
- Children: Matt: 2 Mike: 1

Matthew Alan Chapman (born November 1, 1976) and Michael Raymond Chapman (born September 20, 1973), known collectively as The Brothers Chaps, are American writers, voice actors, directors, animators, producers and composers. They are best known as the creators of the animated series Homestar Runner and Two More Eggs.

== Early life ==
While Matt and Mike Chapman were born in Indiana, they grew up in Decatur, Georgia and later resided in Atlanta. Growing up, the brothers enjoyed creating comic books and filming Super 8 movies.

Mike attended the University of Georgia and studied photography, while Matt went to film school at Florida State University.

== Career ==
Mike Chapman created the character of Homestar Runner in 1996 with friend Craig Zobel. The character debuted in the children's book The Homestar Runner Enters the Strongest Man in the World Contest, which was subsequently posted online as a series of images. In 2000, the Brothers Chaps began to create cartoons with the character using Adobe Flash. As the series progressed, more characters were added to the series and spin-off series were created, notably Strong Bad Emails in 2001. During production of Homestar Runner, Matt has been the primary voice actor for the titular character as well as characters like Strong Bad. Mike has been responsible for much of the animation, as well as the technical aspects of the Homestar Runner site. Both brothers contributed to the writing and direction of the series.

For a time, Matt Chapman worked as a writer and director for the children's television series Yo Gabba Gabba!. He also worked for the Disney Channel animated series Gravity Falls and The Hub live-action series The Aquabats! Super Show!, where he also contributed occasional voice work and supporting acting roles. Matt wrote the Wander Over Yonder episodes "The Bounty" and "The Timebomb" in collaboration with the show's writing staff. Matt also appeared in the second-season finale of Camp Camp, an animated series by Rooster Teeth, as the voice of Neil's father, Carl.

Mike also provides intentionally poor imitations of his brother's voice work for the Powered by The Cheat cartoon series on the Homestar Runner website. In addition, he has served as a writer for Yo Gabba Gabba!, and — like his brother Matt — has collaborated with the Wander Over Yonder staff, credited for writing the episode "The Liar".

The brothers had a general development deal with Disney Television Animation, and developed a series of short animations for Disney XD titled Two More Eggs which ran from 2015 to 2017. They have directed several music videos, including "Heimdalsgate Like a Promethean Curse" by Of Montreal, "Experimental Film" (featuring the Homestar Runner characters, most notably Strong Sad) and "Figure Eight" by They Might Be Giants, "Brand of Skin" by Folk Implosion, and "LA Lindsay" by Y-O-U, the band who also collaborated with the brothers on Strong Bad Sings. In 2017, the duo along with Robert Schneider and James Husband formed the Air-sea Dolphin project, which had two split singles with Honey Radar and the fictional band Sloshy from the Homestar Runner universe.

== Filmography ==
=== Television ===
Year	Title	Role as		Notes
Year	Title	Matt Chapman	Mike Chapman	Notes
2004	Sealab 2021	Larry Palaroncini	—N/a	Singing voice during the montage in the episode "Sharko's Machine".
2007, 2011–2015	Yo Gabba Gabba!	—N/a	—N/a	writers, directors, and occasionally animators
2012–2014	The Aquabats! Super Show!	Bob Higginsbottom / Carl	—N/a	Showrunner, writer, director, actor on the episodes "Haunted Battletram" and "Cobraman!"
2012–2016	Gravity Falls	Abuelita / Mermando / Paci-Fire / Marius / additional voices	—N/a	Writer and actor
2014	Wander Over Yonder	—N/a	—N/a	Matt: Writer; 2 episodes and actor Mike: Writer; 1 episode
2014	Mickey Mouse	—N/a	—N/a	Writer; 1 episode
2015–2019	Star vs. the Forces of Evil	Alfonzo Dolittle	—N/a	
2015–2016	Pickle and Peanut	Mr. Mjart / Mr. Jmart / additional voices	—N/a	
2015–2017	Two More Eggs	Dooble / CGI Palz / Hot Dip / Eggpos / Trauncles Narrator / Hector / Joshow / additional voices	—N/a	both: creators Matt: Voice role
2017–2018	Camp Camp	Carl / Graggle	—N/a	Matt: Voice role, 2 episodes
2018	One Dollar	Clark Shaw	—N/a	episode: "Cooper Shaw"
2019–2022	Amphibia	Tritonio Espada, additional voices	—N/a	
2020–2023	The Owl House	Harvey Park, Steve (as of season 2), additional voices	—N/a	
2024	Teen Titans Go!	Platz	—N/a	Matt: Voice role, 5 episodes; Writer, 2 episodes
2025	StuGo	—N/a	—N/a	Matt: Writer, 1 episode

=== Web series ===
Year	Title	Role as		Notes
Year	Title	Matt Chapman	Mike Chapman	Notes
2000–present	Homestar Runner	Strong Bad / Homestar Runner / Strong Sad / Strong Mad / Bubs / additional voices	Pom Pom / additional voices	both: creators, writers, animators & voice roles
2018	The Aquabats! RadVentures!	Strong Bad / Homestar Runner	—N/a	Matt: voice roles
2022	The Kali Kazoo Show	Strong Bad / Homestar Runner	Pom Pom	both: voice roles Matt: Performance, editing & effects for the music video
2025	Battle for Dream Island	Propeller Hat / Mr. Cookie / Soda	—N/a	Matt: Voice role, 1 episode. Credited as "Mart Champin"

=== Video games ===
Year	Title	Role as		Notes
Year	Title	Matt Chapman	Mike Chapman	Notes
2008	Strong Bad's Cool Game for Attractive People	Strong Bad / Homestar Runner / Strong Sad / Strong Mad / Bubs / additional voices	Pom Pom / Craig / Videlectrix Guy	
2010	Poker Night at the Inventory	Strong Bad	—N/a	
2019	Vacation Simulator	additional voices	—N/a	
2022	Homestar Runner: Halloween Hide n' Seek	Strong Bad / Homestar Runner / Strong Sad / Strong Mad / Bubs / additional voices	—N/a	Originally released in 2021 without voice acting
2023	Dangeresque: The Roomisode Triungulate	Dangeresque / Dangeresque Too / Renaldo / Perducci / additional voices	—N/a	First episode originally released in 2008 without voice acting

=== Films ===
Year	Title	Role as		Notes
Year	Title	Matt Chapman	Mike Chapman	Notes
2003	All the Real Girls	Strong Bad	—N/a	Mike: Art Designer
2025	Teenage Mutant Ninja Turtles: Chrome Alone 2 - Lost in New Jersey	—N/a	—N/a	Theatrical short film; Tubular Tortoise Karate Warriors commercial
