= Everything Is Shifting =

Everything is Shifting

EP by Y-O-U
- Released: May 1, 2005
- Recorded: Spring 2005
- Genre: Rock
- Length: 27:39
- Label: Pleaserock (independent)
- Producer: Y-O-U, Clay Cook

Y-O-U chronology
Y-O-U (2003)	Everything is Shifting (2005)	Flashlights (2007)

Everything is Shifting is a 2005 EP by Atlanta-based rock band Y-O-U. The record represented a striking change in the band's sound, both lyrically and musically, the latter change being inspired in part by the departure of two members, Eric Park and Matt Sonnicksen, in 2004. Multi-instrumentalist Clay Cook assisted the band in the performance and production of Everything Is Shifting and appeared in the video for "Good Luck with that American Dream"; however, he would not become a member of Y-O-U until after the record's release and would then leave the band before its next project Flashlights. "Good Luck with that American Dream" has been licensed for an international Coca-Cola ad.

== Track listing ==
All songs written by Nick Niespodziani, Peter Olson, and Mark Cobb.

1. "Shadows on the Page" - 3:19
2. "Not a Dove" - 3:11
3. "Good Luck with that American Dream" - 4:05
4. "The Change" - 4:24
5. "National Straitjacket" - 4:58
6. "All Arranged #2" - 3:26
7. "Digital Dream" (an electronic remix of "Good Luck with that American Dream") - 4:14

== Music videos ==
"Shadows on the Page"

- Dir: Liz Starkey

"Not a Dove"

- Dir: Chuck Moore
- DP: Pete Wages
- Editor: Myron Vasquez
- Belly dancer: Jennifer Keselowsky
- Feat: Clay Cook

"Good Luck with that American Dream"

- Dir: Peter Sobat
- Feat: Clay Cook

"National Straitjacket"

- Dir: Y-O-U
- Feat: Clay Cook
- Made entirely in Microsoft PowerPoint

== Personnel ==
- Y-O-U: Nicholas Niespodziani, Peter Olson, ?Mark Cobb
- Additional Musicianship: Clay Cook
- Producers: Y-O-U and Clay Cook
- Engineering: Kristofer Sampson, Clay Cook, Peter Olson, Nick Niespodziani
- Mixing: Ben H. Allen
- Mastering: Alex Lowe
- Art Design & Photography: Nick Niespodziani, Peter Olson
