= Homestar Runner =

American comedy Flash-animated web series

- Homestar Runner logo
- Genre: Surreal humor; Satire; Parody; Slapstick
- Created by: The Brothers Chaps
- Written by: Matt Chapman; Mike Chapman
- Voices of: Matt Chapman; Missy Palmer; Mike Chapman
- Country of origin: United States
- Original language: English

Production
- Animators: Mike Chapman; Matt Chapman

Original release
- Release: January 1, 2000 – present

Homestar Runner is an American animated comedy web series created by Mike and Matt Chapman, known collectively as The Brothers Chaps. The series centers on the adventures of a large and diverse cast of characters, headed by the titular character, Homestar Runner. It uses a blend of surreal humor, self-parody, satire, and references to popular culture, in particular video games, classic television, and popular music.

Homestar Runner originated in 1996 as a book written by Mike Chapman and Craig Zobel, intended as a parody of children's literature. While learning Macromedia Flash, Mike and his brother Matt expanded the concept into a website, which was launched on New Year's Day 2000. While the site originally centered on the title character, Strong Bad emerged as a breakout character, and the Strong Bad Email skits became the site's most prominent feature.

At the peak of its popularity, the site was one of the most-visited sites with collections of Flash cartoons on the web. The site went on hiatus in 2010 and new cartoons have been released only occasionally on the website and its YouTube channel since that time.

== History ==
=== 1996–2000: Development ===
Homestar Runner was created in Atlanta in 1996 by University of Georgia students Mike Chapman and friend Craig Zobel, who wrote the original picture book, The Homestar Runner Enters the Strongest Man in the World Contest, while working summer jobs surrounding the 1996 Summer Olympics.

Matt described the origin of the name "Homestar Runner" as an in-joke between themselves and James Huggins, a childhood friend of the Chapman brothers while growing up in Dunwoody, Georgia.

It actually comes from a friend of ours [James]. There was an old local grocery store commercial, and we live in Atlanta, and it advertised the Atlanta Braves. It was like, "the Atlanta Braves hit home runs, and you can hit a home run with savings here!" And so there was this player named Mark Lemke, and they said something like "All star second baseman for the Braves". And our friend James knows nothing about sports, and so he would always do his old-timey radio impression of this guy, and not knowing any positions in baseball or whatever, he'd just be like, "homestar runner for the Braves". And we were just like, "Homestar Runner? That's the best thing we've ever heard!"

Mike Chapman and Craig Zobel originally designed Homestar Runner as a children's book including the characters Homestar Runner, Pom Pom, Strong Bad, and The Cheat. They did not seek publication and distributed copies to friends. Chapman's father sent copies to several publishers, which were rejected. They later used the Super NES video game Mario Paint to create the first cartoon featuring the characters.

=== 2000–2009: Launch and initial popularity ===
Mike Chapman and his younger brother Matt began learning Flash animation around 1999. They developed cartoons based on the original Homestar Runner children's book created with Zobel. These initial cartoons were launched on homestarrunner.com in early 2000. Mike animated the cartoons, Matt provided the voices of the male characters, and Missy Palmer provided the voice of Marzipan.

Initial shorts featured competitions between Homestar Runner as a heroic character and Strong Bad as the villain; over the course of its first year, these expanded to include scenes taking place between competitions, which the creators believed were more humorous. The site debuted a new design, including character designs, in February 2001. These have remained largely consistent to the present.

The site grew slowly at first and primarily through word-of-mouth. They were able to sell a "few dozen" T-shirts by 2001. Mike moved back to New York in mid-2001 and he and Matt started crafting the first Strong Bad Email some kinda robot, intending this to be a weekly feature. The Strong Bad Email series proved very popular, generating significant interest in the site; when the brothers were late in publishing a new Strong Bad Email, they received angry emails asking where the new short was, which Matt said was "a cool feeling to know you're as important as a cup of coffee or morning crossword to some folks". Their father suggested Matt quit his full-time job to devote time to creating more Homestar Runner shorts. With the number of visitors to the site growing, by January 2003 the site had outgrown its original web host, Yahoo. Merchandise sales paid for all of the costs of running the website as well as living costs of the creators, whose retired parents managed many of the business aspects.

In a 2017 interview Gizmodo, the brothers spoke of the period between 2002 and 2005 as their most creative and successful, exploring various media for the shorts and having a large quantity of merchandise. Matt reflected on a day in February 2004 as the highlight of the series, when received a demo tape from They Might Be Giants for a song to use in a Strong Bad Email short and a life-sized replica of Tom Servo from Mystery Science Theater 3000 producer Jim Mallon on the same day. Joss Whedon incorporated references to Homestar Runner into his television shows Buffy the Vampire Slayer and Angel.

=== 2009–2014: Hiatus ===
Through 2010 Homestar Runner remained financially viable for the brothers through sales of related merchandise. Both brothers were married by 2010 and had their children to care for, and they recognized that they would need to find other jobs to support their respective families. When Matt had a second daughter, the two agreed to put the series on hiatus, knowing they would want to come back to it but could not guarantee a time frame. Mike also noted that they had spent nearly ten years delivering a weekly cartoon, and believed that, creatively, they needed a break. The success of Homestar Runner led to Matt and Mike getting writing jobs for television animated series Yo Gabba Gabba!, Gravity Falls, The Aquabats! Super Show!, and Wander Over Yonder.

During this hiatus the brothers released a small number of Homestar Runner cartoons, including ones for 2010's April Fools' Day, Christmas (which they renamed Decemberween), Halloween, and other holidays. They also made a special video featuring Homestar and Strong Bad for the 2013 San Diego Comic-Con to introduce a panel regarding the history of W00tstock.

=== 2014–present: return ===
Matt, after completing work on Gravity Falls, moved back to Atlanta in 2014 where Mike was living, and the two agreed that they now had the opportunity to return to Homestar Runner on a semi-regular basis. Their first short in nearly four years, posted on April 1, 2014, poked fun at how they had not updated the site in years. Matt confirmed their commitment to continue the series in July 2014. Since then, the site has featured occasional updates, usually for holidays. Until 2017, this was mostly due to the brothers' involvement in developing the Disney XD animated show Two More Eggs.

With the impending discontinuation of Adobe Flash in December 2020, most new Homestar Runner animations were released directly as videos to YouTube; the brothers also worked to transfer the older Flash content into video format for archival purposes. Prior to Flash's discontinuation, the Internet Archive included Homestar Runner content in its collection of Flash animations and games. The content is directly viewable in modern browsers through the Ruffle Flash emulator. The Homestar Runner website itself was also updated to use Ruffle, restoring much of its original functionality.

== Characters ==
Homestar Runner cartoons typically center on Homestar Runner, Strong Bad, and the other ten main characters: The Cheat, Marzipan, Coach Z, Bubs, Strong Sad, Strong Mad, Pom Pom, the King of Town, the Poopsmith, and Homsar. The Brothers Chaps have described them as “dumb animal characters”. These characters all live in the fictional town of Free Country, USA. Each character has multiple alternate versions of themselves, such as "Old-Timey" and "20X6" versions.

== Cartoons ==
Homestar Runner features several spin-off series from the main "shorts" and "big 'toons", including the most well-known, Strong Bad Email.

=== Strong Bad Email ===
Strong Bad Emails is a series featuring Strong Bad answering emails from fans. Since starting in August 2001, the initially brief episodes have grown in length and scope, introducing numerous spin-offs, characters, and inside jokes, such as Homsar, Trogdor, Senor Cardgage, 20X6, the Teen Girl Squad shorts, and Homestar Runner Emails (also known as "hremails"). The format, however, has remained largely unchanged. Each episode typically begins with Strong Bad singing a short song to himself while booting up his computer to check fan emails. Starting a reply, he typically mocks the sender's name, spelling, and grammar, and rarely answers questions directly. While early episodes focused mostly on Strong Bad sitting at the computer with occasional cutaways, the cutaways would become more elaborate over time, allowing for more complex story lines to develop, growing tangentially from the initial email. As of November 24, 2025, 210 Strong Bad Emails have been released on the website (with another six exclusive to DVD releases, making it 216 emails in total).

=== Holiday specials ===
Prior to the 2010 hiatus, holiday specials were a regular feature of the site, released to coincide with popular holidays, specifically Halloween and Decemberween (a fictional holiday similar to Christmas also celebrated on December 25). Halloween shorts typically feature the main characters celebrating a traditional aspect of the holiday (such as ghost stories, trick-or-treating or pumpkin carving) in costume, often making pop culture references relating to their costumes. The site also usually releases a separate Halloween video where Strong Bad views a slideshow and mocks and/or appraises photos sent in by real life fans of their Halloween costumes and props modeled after Homestar Runner characters and other elements. Similarly, Decemberween cartoons typically satirize Christmas traditions such as gift-giving and carol-singing. The fact that it takes place on the same day as Christmas has been presented as just a coincidence, having been stated that Decemberween takes place "55 days after Halloween". April Fools' Day features various gags, such as turning the site into a paid subscription service, or turning it upside down.

=== Teen Girl Squad ===
Teen Girl Squad is a crudely drawn comic strip narrated by Strong Bad, using a falsetto voice. The series was a spin off of Strong Bad Email No. 53, comic, in which Strong Bad is asked to make a comic strip of a girl and her friends. The comic features four archetypal teenage girls, "Cheerleader", "So and So", "What's Her Face" and "The Ugly One", and satirizes high school life, teen movies, and television. Each episode follows the girls in typical high school situations, often leading to their gruesome deaths. A spinoff of this series is "4 Gregs", which follows four of the squad's nerdy classmates, all named Greg.

=== Marzipan's Answering Machine ===
Marzipan's Answering Machine is a series of cartoons with almost no animation. It features messages from the other characters, being played on the answering machine belonging to the character Marzipan. In early episodes, the episode number ended in .0 (for example, Marzipan's Answering Machine Version 5.0), but since Marzipan changed to a new answering machine, the number ends in .2 (for example, Marzipan's Answering Machine Version 15.2). In every episode, Strong Bad prank calls Marzipan, badly pretending to be someone else, such as "Detective Everybody", "Safety Dan", and sometimes other characters. Although the animation is usually just a picture of the answering machine, sometimes there are short animated segments featuring the characters. As of April 1, 2016, there are 17 Marzipan's Answering Machines.

=== Puppet Stuff ===
These are live action shorts in which the regular characters are depicted by puppets. These may be skits, or musical performances with They Might Be Giants. Many Puppet Stuff videos feature the characters interacting with children, often related to The Brothers Chaps. One spin-off series, "Biz Cas Fri", depicts Homestar and Strong Bad's interactions from his office cubicle at work. The first Biz Cas Fri video arguably first coined the term Doge.

=== Powered by The Cheat ===
In-universe, "Powered by The Cheat" videos are short cartoons made by the character of The Cheat, and are often music videos done for other characters. During these segments, Matt Chapman does the animation and Mike Chapman provides the voices, a switching of their usual roles. As a result, the cartoons' animations are deliberately poor.

=== Alternate Universes ===
Over time, many alternate versions of the Homestar Runner world and characters appeared, parodying other cartoons and animation styles. Many of these feature in their own cartoons. The many alternate universes crossed over with each other in some cartoons, such as the 150th Strong Bad Email, alternate universe.

Old-Timey cartoons take place in an old-time setting, with most of the characters being Old-Timey counterparts of the Homestar Runner characters. These cartoons are in black and white with a film grain effect and scratchy audio quality. They parody the distinctive style of animated cartoons during the 1920s and 1930s (à la Steamboat Willie), and can be seen as perhaps deliberately unfunny, to make a slanted joke about such old-style cartoons.

20X6 (pronounced "twenty exty-six"), a parody of the Mega Man and EarthBound games' "year 200X", originated from Strong Bad Email No. 57, japanese cartoon, an email asking Strong Bad what he would look like if he were in a Japanese anime. The main character, Stinkoman, is an anime version of Strong Bad with blue hair, a shiny body and robot boots. He is always looking for a fight, asking various characters he interacts with to engage him in a "challenge" ("Are you asking for a challenge?"). There is also a game, Stinkoman 20X6, which is heavily based on the Mega Man series.

Cheat Commandos is a parody of G.I. Joe that features a cast of characters that are the same species as The Cheat. Most are based on G.I. Joe characters, or characters from other 1980s cartoons. The cartoon is constantly advertising its products in the cartoons by such methods as referring to the areas they are in as "playsets", a convoy truck as an "action figure storage vehicle", and by ending each cartoon with the phrase "Buy all our playsets and toys!", sung in a patriotic way. It also parodies the G.I. Joe cartoons' use of public service announcements, referring to nonsensical things like "peer-2-teen choice behaviors". Some cartoons feature the character Crack Stuntman, the fictional voice actor for the Cheat Commandos character Gunhaver.

== Other media ==
=== Music ===
The Homestar Runner site frequently features songs and videos within their animated shorts or as stand-alone entities. These are primarily sung and performed either by the characters or by fictitious artists serving as parodies of various genres. Real-life musicians They Might Be Giants have collaborated multiple times with the Homestar Runner site. In 2004, the Homestar Runner characters were featured in the music video to their song Experimental Film. Additionally, they have performed multiple times with a puppet of Homestar Runner. They have also collaborated on several other shorts, including Strong Bad Email No. 200, email thunder.

In Strong Bad Email No. 58, dragon, Strong Bad is asked to draw a dragon, creating Trogdor, the Burninator (stylized as TROGDOR, the BURNİNATOR), and performing his heavy metal theme song. Trogdor's popularity saw the character appear on merchandise such as T-shirts, hoodies, and posters, with an extended version of the song appearing on the CD Strong Bad Sings and Other Type Hits.

In 2002, a fictional hair metal band, Limozeen, was introduced as a parody of 1980s bands such as Skid Row, White Lion and Poison; with songs including "Because, It's Midnite" and "Nite Mamas". On March 17, 2008, "Limozeen" (actually the Atlanta indie band Y-O-U along with Matt Chapman on vocals) performed a live show in Atlanta, Georgia, and again on November 8, 2008, opening for indie pop band of Montreal. A college rock band called Sloshy was introduced in 2007. Sloshy features songs in the musical vein of Pavement such as "We Don't Really Even Care About You" and "The B-est of B-Sides". Other fictitious artists include Scandinavian death metal parody Taranchula (although performing more in a thrash metal/sludge metal style); rapper Peacey P, with a rapping style resembling that of Snoop Dogg; and the self-absorbed R&B artist Tenerence Love, a parody of Barry White and such artists.

=== Browser games ===
Beyond cartoons, Homestar Runner offers a variety of online games. Early games such as the Homestar Soundboard, "Homestar Talker", and Lite-Brite emulator "Astro-Lite 2600" are basic web toys featuring the characters, and can now be found on the "Old Games" section of the site. Over time, more recent games have diversified and become more complex, with many being released as products of "Videlectrix", a game company within the world of Homestar Runner and a side project of The Brothers Chaps, spoofing games of the 1980s. Often the games would originate as video games played by the characters in the cartoon, such as Secret Collect, StrongBadZone, and Strong Bad's RhinoFeeder, all parodies of early Atari and arcade games, originating in the Strong Bad Email video games.

TROGDOR! which previously appeared in the Arcade Game short, features the titular dragon Trogdor the Burninator attempting to burn all the cottages on each stage without being slain by knights. A spin-off of TROGDOR!, called Peasant's Quest, is an adventure game featuring Rather Dashing, a young peasant in short pants. After he finds his cottage burned to the ground, he vows to kill the destroyer of his cottage, Trogdor. The game uses a system that is a near-replica of Sierra Entertainment's Adventure Game Interpreter, used in King's Quest, Space Quest and several other early Sierra titles. This system is something like text adventure games yet it has simple visuals. Stinkoman 20X6 is a Mega Man-style platform game featuring the characters and world of anime parody 20X6. Nine levels were added to the game over the course of 2005, while the tenth and final level was not released until December 2020, days before Flash would no longer be supported by browsers.

The Thy Dungeonman series are parodies of text adventure games originating from Strong Bad Email No. 94, video games. In each game, your goal is to "get ye flask". Though the game purports to be set in the medieval era, the text is actually rendered in mock Early Modern English, in the style of William Shakespeare. Thy Dungeonman has two sequels: Thy Dungeonman II, which expands on the features of the original game and can only be found on the Videlectrix site, and Thy Dungeonman III which adds basic graphics and can be found on the Homestar Runner site. "Ye Flask" and "You can't get ye flask" have become catch-phrases in the Homestar Runner universe, eventually spawning a T-shirt in the Homestar Runner store.

In 2007 the website produced Wii versions of some of the games on the site, for the Wii internet browser. When played on a computer, they use the mouse only.

Two point-and-click adventure game titles by the Brothers Chaps made in Unity have been released to Steam and Itch.io, Halloween Hide & Seek and Dangeresque: The Roomisode Triungulate, an expanded remake of the original Dangeresque: Roomisode 1 web game that adds two new episodes.

=== Strong Bad's Cool Game for Attractive People ===
On April 10, 2008, an episodic licensed game based on the series centering around Strong Bad titled Strong Bad's Cool Game for Attractive People (abbreviated as SBCG4AP) was announced for the Wii's WiiWare service and Microsoft Windows, developed by Telltale Games in partnership with Videlectrix. The first episode, Homestar Ruiner, premiered on August 11, 2008, on Telltale Games' website and in North America on Nintendo's WiiWare service on August 11, 2008. It was also released in Europe and Australia the following Friday (August 15, 2008). The second episode, Strong Badia the Free, was released on September 15 on the WiiWare service in North America and on the Telltale Games' website, and in the PAL region on October 3. The third episode, Baddest of the Bands, was released on Telltale Games' website and the WiiWare service in North America on October 27, and to the PAL region on November 21. The fourth episode, Dangeresque 3: The Criminal Projective, was released on Telltale Games' website and WiiWare in North America on November 17, and in the PAL region on December 5. The fifth and final episode, 8-Bit is Enough, was released to North America on December 15 and in the PAL region on January 2, 2009. In 2010, it was decided that Telltale games would release SBCG4AP for the Mac operating system after a vote on the Telltale Games website.

=== Poker Night at the Inventory ===
Strong Bad appears as one of the computer-controlled opponents in Telltale's Poker Night at the Inventory, using the same model from SBCG4AP. Players can unlock in-game card sets and table designs based on Homestar Runner. Additionally, Strong Bad will occasionally bet Dangeresque Too's sunglasses in place of in-game cash; defeating him after doing so will unlock the glasses as an equippable cosmetic item for the Demoman in Team Fortress 2. The game was released for PC and Mac on November 22, 2010. A remastered version released on March 5, 2026 for Nintendo Switch, PlayStation 4, and PC.

=== Trogdor!! The Board Game ===
Trogdor!! The Board Game is a board game made by The Brothers Chaps in collaboration with James Ernest. The campaign was put on Kickstarter on Tuesday, July 17, 2018, with a goal of $75,000, which was surpassed in the first few hours. On July 23, the total had reached over $700,000. The campaign ended on Wednesday, August 15, 2018, with a total of $1,421,903 (nearly 20 times the goal) and 23,338 backers. In 2022, an expansion pack titled Majicks & 'Mergencies Expando Deck was released, adding new cards and gameplay elements. Extra copies are sold in the website's store.

Trogdor!! is described as a cooperative puzzle area control game in which the players work together to burninate all of the game tiles, thatched-roof cottages, and peasants. Every player controls Trogdor, assuming the role of one of the twelve "Keepers of Trogdor". Each Keeper has unique powers and items, both decided by cards. The game is for one to six players, and play time is 30 minutes with variable levels of difficulty the players can set. The recommended age is 14+. It comes with a mini-game titled "Stack 'Em To The Heavens" in which you stack the meeples in different ways. An album titled Trogdor!! The Board Game Rulebook EP, was made to explain the rules of the game.

=== Crime Scene Tamperer ===
In September 2026, the party game Crime Scene Tamperer, marketed under the tagline "Dangeresque Presents: Crime Scene Tamperer: The Party Game for Guilty Parties!" Featuring Strong Bad's alter ego "Dangeresque," the game involves 2-4 players of ages 14 and up in three scene. Each player attempts to frame their opponents for the crime that Dangeresque attempts to solve. Crime Scene Tamperer is published and distributed by Greater Than Games.

=== Walkabout Mini Golf ===
VR game developer Mighty Coconut and Homestar Runner creators collaborated on a self-described "takeover" of Walkabout Mini Golf, which was released in June 2026. The new "distraction pack" featured characters from Homestar Runner and voiceovers by Mike and Matt Chapman.

== Impact ==
=== Collaborations with other artists ===
The Brothers Chaps have partnered up with rock band They Might Be Giants and supplied animation for a music video of their song "Experimental Film". The creators of Homestar Runner spent time with the band and wrote songs that have been released on the website as "Puppet Jam", a spin-off of "Puppet Stuff", where Puppet Homestar sings with TMBG. TMBG also wrote the music for Strong Bad Email No. 99, different town, and the band wrote and vocalized the intro song of the 200th Strong Bad Email. Another group, The Skate Party, helped The Brothers Chaps create "The Cheat Theme Song". The band Y-O-U helped with the Strong Bad Sings and Other Type Hits CD, as well as songs on the strongbad_email.exe DVDs. The Brothers Chaps also employed the services of Paul and Storm of the a cappella band Da Vinci's Notebook to create a theme song for the Old-Timey version of The Cheat, called "Ballad of The Sneak"; the duo later wrote the theme tune for the Stinkoman 20X6 game. Matt Chapman provided guest vocals as Strong Bad on The Aquabats' "Pink Pants!" from their 2011 album, Hi-Five Soup!. Strong Bad's voice also appears on Shellac's "Genuine Lulabelle" off the album "Excellent Italian Greyhound" from 2007.

Discussing how he and his sibling decide which projects to work on, Mike Chapman said, "We learned how to politely say no to things that were going to affect our lives negatively. If it's going to be fun, if we're going to enjoy doing it, and if the end project is going to be something we want to have happen, we say yes."

=== Reception ===
In 2003, the site received several million hits a month and almost a thousand emails a day. According to Matt Chapman, the site did no advertising, but grew on word of mouth and endorsements. "Certain bands, like fairly popular bands and stuff would link us on their site and, you know we were Shockwave site of the day a couple of times over the years." Homestar Runner's popularity, coupled with its positive critical response, has led to the website receiving widespread coverage. Homestar Runner has been featured in Wired, National Review, Entertainment Weekly, Total Gamer, G4, and NPR's All Things Considered.

A review published in National Review characterized the site's humor as having "the innocence of slapstick with sharp satire of American popular culture"—humor that "tends to be cultural, not political."

The site-generated music has enjoyed popularity, such that two songs, "Trogdor" by the character Strong Bad and "Because, It's Midnite" by Limozeen, have been included in the successful Guitar Hero II and Guitar Hero Encore: Rocks the 80s video games, respectively.

==== Homestar Runner-themed e-mail worm ====
An email worm named Lacon, which featured Homestar Runner characters, was created and distributed by someone going by the name of DimenZion in 2003. It affected 32-bit Windows computers on the 10th of each month, emailing copies of itself to contacts in the computer's address book, and also adding various .exe files to the hard drive. Its final payload showed a Homestar Runner Flash animation called "The System is Down" in a browser window.
