= Guitar Hero II =

2006 video game

- PlayStation 2 cover art
- Developer: Harmonix
- Publishers: RedOctane (PlayStation 2); Activision (Xbox 360)
- Director: Daniel Sussman
- Producers: Elena Siegman; Tracy Rosenthal-Newsom
- Designer: Chris Canfield
- Programmer: James Flemming
- Artist: Dare Matheson
- Series: Guitar Hero
- Platforms: PlayStation 2, Xbox 360
- Release: PlayStation 2: NA: November 7, 2006; AU: November 15, 2006; EU: November 24, 2006; Xbox 360: NA: April 3, 2007; AU: April 4, 2007; EU: April 6, 2007
- Genre: Rhythm
- Modes: Single-player, multiplayer

Guitar Hero II is a 2006 rhythm game developed by Harmonix and published by RedOctane for the PlayStation 2 and Activision for the Xbox 360. It is the sequel to Guitar Hero (2005) and the second installment in the Guitar Hero series. The game was first released for the PlayStation 2 in November 2006, and then for the Xbox 360 in April 2007, with additional content not originally in the PlayStation 2 version.

Like in the original Guitar Hero, the player uses a peripheral in the shape of a solid-body electric guitar to simulate playing rock music as notes scroll towards the player. Most of the gameplay from the original game remains intact, and provides new modes and note combinations. The game features more than 40 popular licensed songs, many of them cover versions recorded for the game, spanning five decades (from the 1960s to the 2000s). The PlayStation 2 version of Guitar Hero II can be purchased individually or in a bundle that packages the game with a cherry red Gibson SG guitar controller. The Xbox 360 version of the game is offered in a bundle that packages the game with a white Gibson Explorer guitar controller.

Since its release, Guitar Hero II has been met with both critical and commercial success, helping the Guitar Hero series become a cultural phenomenon. As of December 1, 2007, the game has sold 3.1 million copies. It has spawned the "expansion" title Guitar Hero Encore: Rocks the 80s for the PlayStation 2. A sequel, Guitar Hero III: Legends of Rock, was released in 2007.

== Development ==
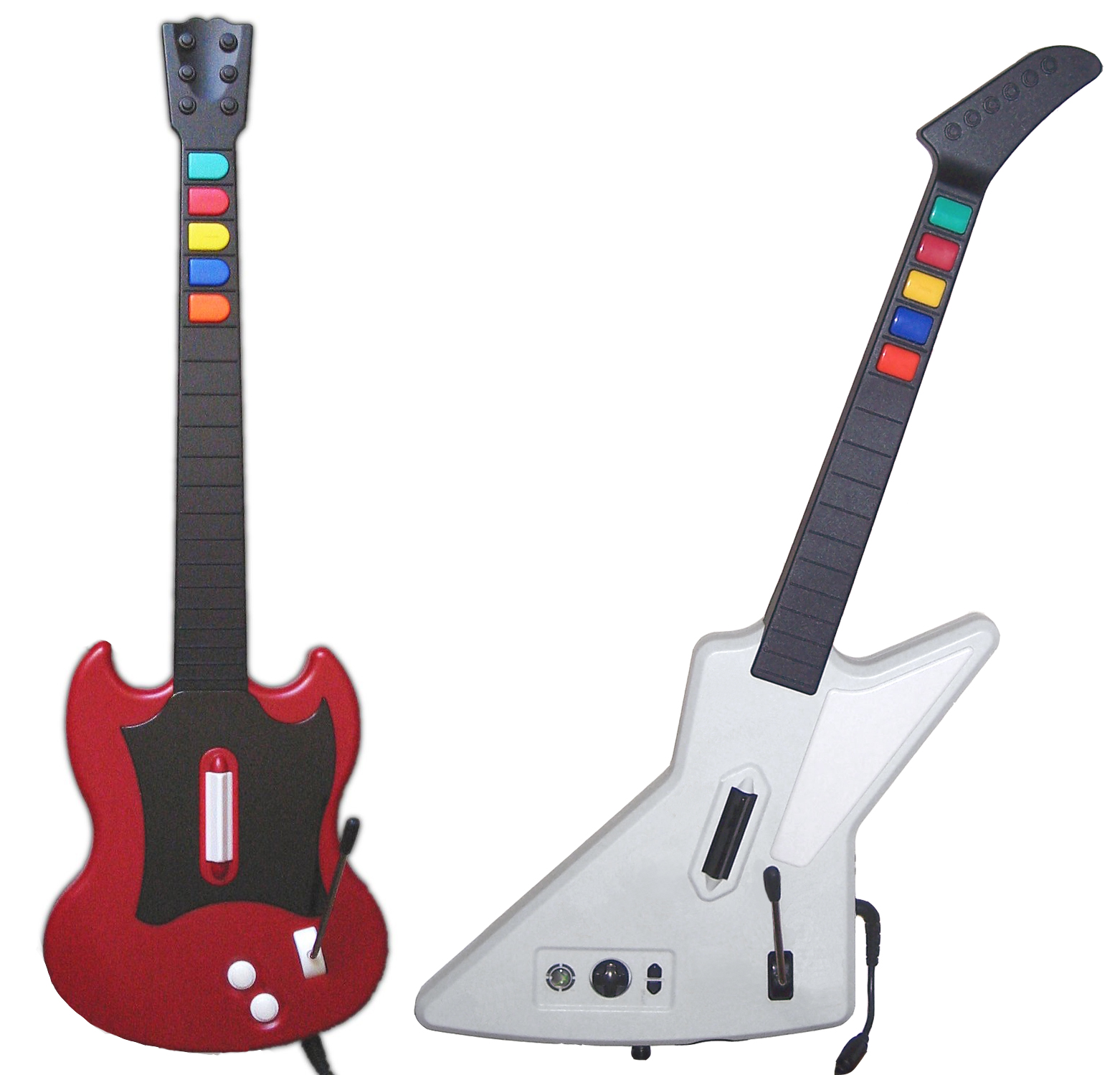
The guitar controllers bundled with Guitar Hero II: cherry red Gibson SG (PS2) and Gibson X-Plorer (Xbox 360)

The surprise success of Guitar Hero readily led to the development of a sequel for the game. According to developer John Tam, the team felt they "hit the sweet spot" of genres and decades within the set list and wanted to maintain that for the sequel. The costs of obtaining licensing rights for music from "big bands" such as AC/DC, Led Zeppelin, Van Halen, and Metallica, in addition to the lack of understanding of how the music would be used prevented these groups from being used in Guitar Hero. However, Tam notes that with the success of Guitar Hero, "They understand that we're not going to embarrass their music, we're going to actually pay homage to their music and get it to the point where people are going to fall in love with their music and understand their music in a totally different way than they've ever experienced it before." They also had requests by artists to include master tracks within the game.

In addition to working more directly with artists, RedOctane and Activision worked with various musical instrument and equipment companies to provide in-game product placement. Such vendors include BOSS Effectors, DW Drums, Eden Bass Amplification, EMG, Epiphone, Ernie Ball Strings, Gibson Guitar Corporation, Guitar Center, Hofner, Kramer, Krank, Line 6, Mesa Boogie, MusicMan Basses, Orange Amplifiers, Randall Amplifiers, Roland, Vans and the Vans Warped Tour, VHT, and Zildjian.

Guitar Hero II was originally announced for the PlayStation 2 on April 17, 2006. A demo version of the PlayStation 2 version of Guitar Hero II was released with issue #110 of Official PlayStation Magazine on October 5, 2006. Features of the demo included four playable songs on four difficulty levels for single player and co-op modes. Demo releases do not feature the ability to flip the notes for left-handed players. Demo versions feature the songs "Shout at the Devil", "You Really Got Me", "Strutter" and "YYZ". The retail game was released for the PlayStation 2 on November 7, 2006, in North America, November 15, 2006 in Australia, and November 24, 2006, in Europe. It was released as both a stand-alone game, and as a bundle containing the game with a cherry Gibson SG guitar controller.

=== Xbox 360 version ===
When Activision purchased RedOctane in 2006, the company expressed strong interest in bringing the Guitar Hero series to "every significant new format" in order to take advantage of the next generation of consoles. The Xbox 360 version was announced on September 27, 2006, at Microsoft's X06. Dusty Welch of RedOctane stated that the Xbox 360 "provides an incredible platform for facilitating downloadable content" due to the integrated hard drive on the console. The Xbox 360 version of the game included 10 exclusive songs and additional content available for purchase through the Xbox Live Marketplace.

The Xbox 360 version was released on April 3, 2007, in North America and Australia, and then on April 6, 2007, in Europe (only as a bundle containing the game and a wired Gibson X-Plorer guitar controller). It was released as a stand-alone game for the Xbox 360 in the UK on January 25, 2008. The arrangement of the songs were also altered, and the graphics were slightly improved.

== Gameplay ==
Gameplay is based on the successful formula created for the first Guitar Hero game; the player may use the guitar peripheral to play scrolling notes by holding the corresponding fret button on the guitar neck and simultaneously pressing the strum bar. Alternatively, one can play with the DualShock 2 or Xbox 360 controller by using four shoulder buttons and a face button, mapped to specific fret keys.

Several changes have been made to the gameplay mechanics for Guitar Hero II: hammer-on and pull-off functionality has been improved, and three note chords have been introduced, scored as triple points if played correctly. There are additional statistics available for a song upon completion, and the scores achieved in either Quick Play or Career mode are saved to the same in-game high-score list. The handedness of the guitar can now be toggled from the Pause menu when playing a song (previously, this was only available from the game's main menu). For the Xbox 360 version, scores can also be compared with other players through Xbox Live via the Leaderboard feature, and there are 50 Achievements that can be earned in the game.

=== Career mode ===
Xbox 360 version of the game displaying the scoring meter (left), the guitar fretboard (middle), and the Rock and Star Power Meters (right)

In Career mode, players create a band name and select a guitarist from among the available characters. Eight characters, each representing a unique genre of rock music - are available from the start of the game: Eddie Knox (rockabilly), Axel Steel (heavy metal), Casey Lynch (hard rock), Lars Ümlaüt (extreme metal), Izzy Sparks (glam), Judy Nails (alternative), Johnny Napalm (punk), and Pandora (gothic). Additional characters can also be purchased, allowing them to be used in later sessions.

Only the lead guitar is available to be played in the Career mode. Over the course of the Career mode the band plays at eight available venues. The venue system from the original game has been altered slightly and has the band traveling geographically from town to town in order to play at the next arena. The venues are Nilbog High School, The Rat Cellar Pub, The Blackout Bar, The RedOctane Club, the Rock City Theater, the Vans Warped Tour, Harmonix Arena and Stonehenge. The venues feature lighting and pyrotechnics that are synchronized with the music.

Not all songs in the main setlist are available from the start. Once a song is unlocked for play within Career Mode, it becomes available for play in all other modes. When working through Career Mode at a specific difficulty level, the next tier of songs is unlocked once the required number of songs on the current tier (3–5, depending on difficulty and console) are completed. Additionally, the encore song for a particular tier is only made available once its requirements are completed. On the Easy difficulty setting, there are no encores available, but the next tier will be unlocked immediately after completing the required songs in the previous tier.

Successful completion of a song on Medium or higher difficulty during Career mode will earn the player in-game cash. Higher difficulty levels and better scoring performances are rewarded with more cash. In-game money can be used at The Store to buy various items. Some items are available only after completing all songs at higher difficulty levels or 5-star performances. Within The Store, the player can purchase new Gibson guitars, guitar finishes, three additional characters, alternate outfits for the eight characters available from the start, bonus songs, and videos. For unknown reasons, the bonus videos are absent from the PAL version of the game. Within the Xbox 360 version, there is also an option to access the Guitar Hero II content on the Xbox Live Marketplace.

=== Multiplayer ===
In cooperative multiplayer, the two players share their score, Rock Meter, and Star Power. Screenshot from the PlayStation 2 version.

There are three different multiplayer modes available:

- Cooperative

One player plays lead guitar while another plays either bass guitar or rhythm guitar, depending on the song. Both players share a score, rock meter, star power meter, and streak multiplier. Cooperative mode is the only multiplayer mode in which a song can be failed. Star power can only be activated by both players simultaneously.

- Face-Off

This is the same multiplayer mode as featured in the original game, though in Guitar Hero II both players can select their own level of difficulty. In this mode, players alternate between playing sections of the selected song. The scores are weighted so that a player who hits fewer notes on Easy difficulty may not necessarily lose against an opponent on Expert difficulty who hits more notes.

- Pro Face-Off

Players play the full lead guitar track on the same difficulty. For the PlayStation 2 mode, this is available upon completion of any career level, while for the Xbox 360 version, the mode is unlocked after completing the career mode at Easy level or higher. The score system is identical as the song could be played alone, but songs cannot be failed in this mode.

Although, online multiplayer was not available at the release of Guitar Hero II for the Xbox 360, RedOctane has stated that they hope to be able provide this later once they are able to work out the technical issues.

=== Practice mode ===
Practice mode is a new addition to the game, allowing a player to practice certain sections of a song ("Verse 2," "Chorus," "Bridge 3," "Gtr Solo 4," etc.) on different difficulties and instruments. Practice mode gives the player the ability to toggle the speed of the notes (Full Speed, Slow, Slower and Slowest) and does not stop a song no matter how many mistakes are made. Players can play the bass guitar lines on most songs. On others, a rhythm guitar line is available instead.

== Soundtrack ==
Both the PlayStation 2 and Xbox 360 versions of Guitar Hero II feature the same core 64 playable songs (40 licensed, 24 bonus songs). Among the featured tracks are Van Halen's version for The Kinks' "You Really Got Me", "Sweet Child O' Mine" by Guns N' Roses, "Girlfriend" by Matthew Sweet, "Woman" by Wolfmother, "War Pigs" by Black Sabbath, and "Free Bird" by Lynyrd Skynyrd. The Xbox 360 version of the game contains 10 exclusive tracks not included in the PlayStation 2 version, including "Billion Dollar Babies" by Alice Cooper, "Rock and Roll, Hoochie Koo" by Rick Derringer, and "The Trooper" by Iron Maiden. Additionally, the Xbox 360 version allows for downloadable songs to be purchased on the Xbox Live Marketplace. The Xbox 360 version also features a reorganized set list that provides a more balanced progression in difficulty.

Most of the songs featured in the main set list are cover versions, with the exception of "Stop!", "Possum Kingdom", "Dead!", and "John the Fisherman"; these four are based on master recordings. The unlockable bonus songs are all master recordings, including some specifically arranged for use within Guitar Hero II. Cover songs are credited on screen with the phrase "as made famous by" (for example, "Heart-Shaped Box, as made famous by Nirvana"), while the original songs are credited with "as performed by" (for example, "John the Fisherman, as performed by Primus").

RedOctane stated that the Xbox 360 version of Guitar Hero II "planned to feature more downloadable content than any other 360 title" utilizing the Xbox Live Marketplace, including many of the songs from the original Guitar Hero a week after the release of the game. Four such packs have been released since April 11, 2007. Additionally, two packs featuring new content to the Guitar Hero series have also been released, including songs from My Chemical Romance, Protest the Hero, Trivium, and Atreyu. There have also been individual track downloads featuring songs from bands Los Rodríguez, Pleymo, and Soilwork.

== Featured instruments ==
Guitar Hero II features many popular real world Gibson, Epiphone, and Kramer guitars, including the Gibson Les Paul, Gibson SG, Gibson Flying V, (these three being the only ones available from the start) Gibson Sonex 180 and Gibson Explorer. Oddities such as the double necked Gibson EDS-1275 and unusual looking Gibson Corvus also make an appearance. Several available finishes are also recognizable from popular guitarists, including Zakk Wylde's bullseye Les Paul. As play progresses, several custom shaped guitars become available, although some are notable in the real world such as the US and Battle Axe (a similar looking bass is played by Gene Simmons, and the guitar was played by John Christ of Samhain/Danzig fame). Basses, such as the Music Man StingRay, Gibson Thunderbird, and the Höfner bass (as made famous by Paul McCartney, the bassist for the Beatles) are also available for co-op play.

The band itself plays with Orange amps and DW drum kits, along with more in-game endorsements. When the player passes each set of songs in career mode, his/her band is rewarded with money and equipment endorsements, including Ernie Ball strings, Boss effects, Line 6 guitar amplifiers, VHT amplifiers, Mesa Boogie amplifiers, and Roland keyboards. These products then appear on stage while the band plays the ensuing setlists.

== Reception ==
Reception

Aggregate scores
Aggregator	Score	
Aggregator	PS2	Xbox 360
GameRankings	93%	93%
Metacritic	92/100	92/100

Review scores
Publication	Score	
Publication	PS2	Xbox 360
1Up.com	A	A
Game Informer	9/10, 9.25/10	9.5/10,9/10
GamePro	4.5/5	4.75/5
GameSpot	8.7/10	8.9/10
GameTrailers	9.6/10	9.4/10
IGN	9.5/10	9.6/10
Official U.S. PlayStation Magazine	10/10	
Play	9/10	
X-Play	5/5	

Awards
Publication	Award
E3 2006	Game Critics Award for Best Puzzle/Trivia/Parlor Game
IGN's 2006 Awards	Best Music Game; Best PlayStation 2 Music Game; Best Licensed Soundtrack; Best PlayStation 2 Licensed Soundtrack; Best PlayStation 2 Offline Multiplayer Game
2007 IEAA Awards	Post Logistics PlayStation Game of the Year
Next Generation's Top 50	4th best game of 2006
2006 Spike TV Video Game Awards	Best Soundtrack
10th Annual Interactive Achievement Awards	Family Game of the Year; Outstanding Achievement in Soundtrack

The PlayStation 2 version of Guitar Hero II was critically acclaimed. It received a 10/10 review in the December 2006 issue of Official U.S. PlayStation Magazine and was awarded the Game of the Month award. The game received a rating of 9.5/10 from IGN, ranking higher than the original game in the series and amongst IGN's highest rated PlayStation 2 games ever. IGN would later include it on their 2007 list of "The Top 100 Games of All Time" at #49. GameSpot reviewed the PlayStation 2 version with a rating of 8.7/10, and the Xbox 360 version 8.9, both slightly lower than its predecessor. Game Informer gave it a 9/10, while its "second opinion" rating was better, at 9.25/10. According to GameRankings, the average critic score of Guitar Hero II is 93%, making it the 9th best reviewed game of 2006. The Australian video game talk show Good Game's two reviewers gave the game a 9/10 and 10/10.

The Xbox 360 version has earned similarly positive reviews and slightly higher scores with a 9.5/10 in the March issue of Official Xbox Magazine, a 4.75/5 from GamePro, a 9.5/10 from Play Magazine a 9.6/10 from IGN, and a perfect score of 5/5 from Got-Next. As of April 3, 2007, the Game Rankings score is 94%. The popular G4 television show X-Play gave both versions of the game a 5/5. Additionally, the Australian Xbox Magazine has also awarded the game, for the first time, an 11/10, in a reference to This Is Spinal Tap. Hyper's Daniel Wilks commends the game for its "huge number of tracks" but criticises it for "some really average covers".

Common praise for the game by critics is aimed at the new multiplayer and practice modes. Common critiques concern the song list, which includes more hard rock and metal than the previous game, deeming it less accessible to casual players. Other common critiques concern the quality of the covers.

The downloadable song packs for the Xbox 360 version have been criticized for being too pricey. The price was seen by many fans of the series as being far too expensive and was met with resistance and angst with a large number of people pledging to boycott the content. Microsoft's Xbox Live Director of Programming, Major Nelson, defending the pricing and release scheme, and attributed the high cost of the content to "licensing issues" on the Xbox 360 platform, as all contracts drawn up for songs from the original game had to be rewritten, since they are playable on an additional console.

In 1UP.com's review for the Xbox 360 version of the game, the downloadable song packs are noted as a "mixed blessing"; praise is given for retooling the songs with better gameplay elements such as the inclusion of co-op modes, but the fact that the songs come in pricey packs of three "defeats much of the appeal". In an interview with RedOctane president Kai Huang, Huang stated that the decision to pack the songs in three was made to keep the cost of the tracks down. Though Huang felt the pricing was fair, he noted afterward "we do listen to the fans and take any feedback we receive seriously."

=== Sales ===
In December 2006, Guitar Hero II for PlayStation 2 was the second best-selling video game of the month, selling 805,200 units. It was outsold only by Gears of War for Xbox 360, which sold 815,700 units. It was the fifth best-selling video game of the fiscal year of 2006, with 1.3 million copies sold. It was also the third best-selling game for the PlayStation 2, behind Madden NFL 07 and Kingdom Hearts II. Total sales of the game during 2006 were $200 million.

On July 12, 2007, Dusty Welch of RedOctane stated that there have been over 300,000 downloads of the music packs until that point and that the prices were "very attractive and desirable for consumers." On September 11, 2007, Activision reported that with over 650,000 downloads, the music packs qualified as "multi-platinum" under RIAA's definitions.

== Technical issues ==
No official statement from RedOctane or Activision were made about the discs or the game itself having any issues, but players have reported songs freezing or skipping, causing the audio to be unsynchronized; unusually long loading screens; and menus that freeze or lock up entirely causing the game to crash. The RedOctane Support Center Answer Guide states, "We're already in the process of looking into this and testing to replicate the experience. We'll notify everyone with our results shortly, and will have a positive resolution if need be."

Two models of the X-Plorer controller were released for the Xbox 360 version of the game: model numbers 95055 and 95065. Of the two versions, the 95055 has an RJ-11 jack for effect pedals near the controller cord and is subject to having an unresponsive whammy bar. RedOctane later responded, saying that they "isolated this issue to two model numbers that can be found on the guitar's packaging". Customers are able to exchange these models for new models.

On April 13, 2007, Activision revealed that the issue was not a problem with the hardware, and that the guitars were not defective. The cause of the problem was anti-cheat protection software, and Activision released a patch on Xbox Live on April 14, 2007, to remedy it. However, this patch may have caused some unintended side effects. Starting on April 16, 2007, numerous users began reporting lockups and failures of their system after downloading and installing this patch. RedOctane stated, "We're aware of the problem and we're looking into it."

Numerous game players have also reported problems with static shocks to the X-Plorer guitars causing various fret buttons (usually the green one) to permanently malfunction. Multiple exchanges of guitars have not solved the problem, as exchanged guitars also exhibit the problem. To date, RedOctane has not solved the problem, and has refused to extend warranties to replacement guitars, time limiting the warranty back to the original date of purchase.
