= Juli (band) discography =

Discography of German alternative pop band

Juli discography
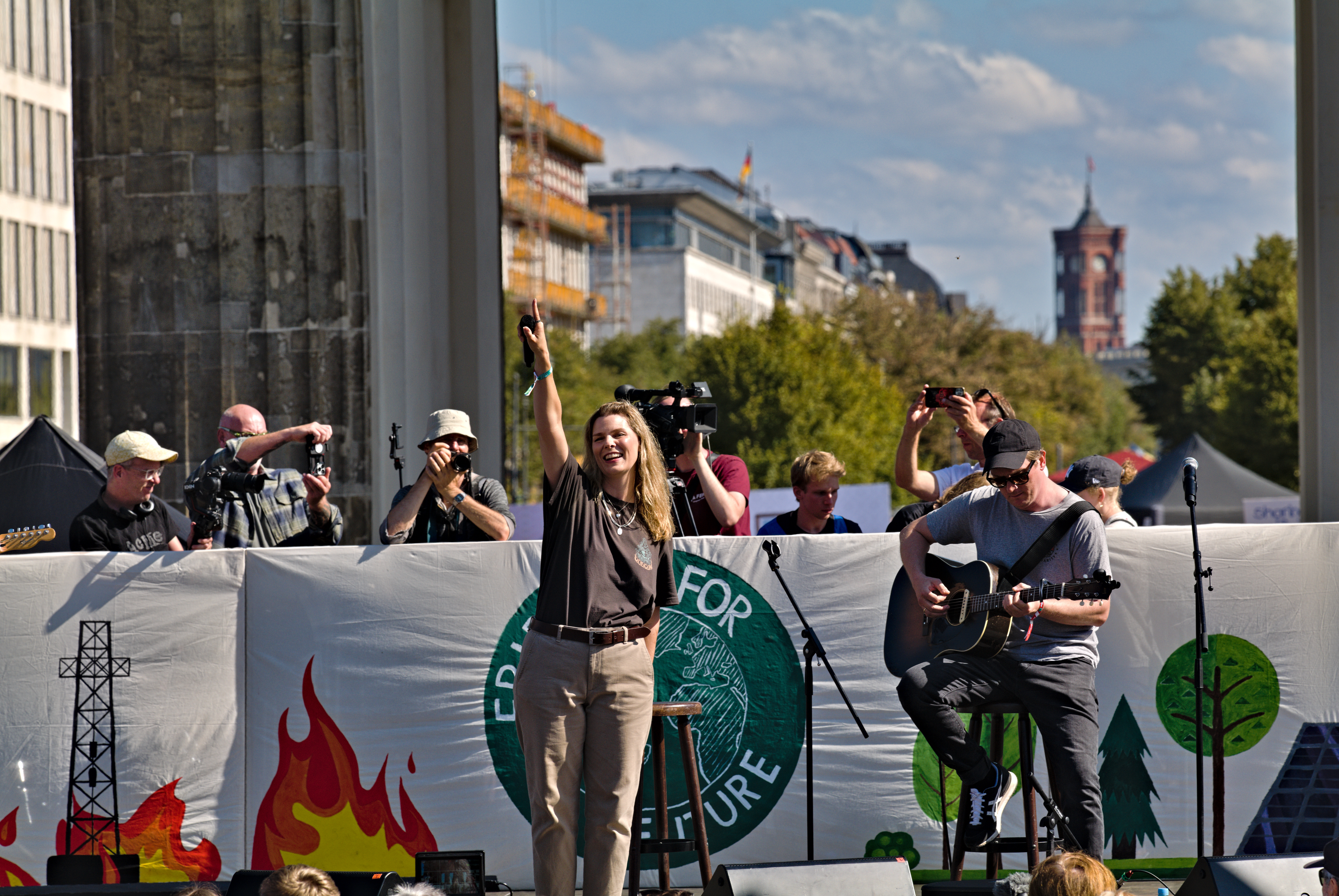
- Juli in Berlin in 2023.
- Studio albums: 5
- Live albums: 1

The discography of Juli, a German alternative pop band, contains four studio albums, one live album and seventeen singles. The band released their first studio album Es ist Juli after signing to Universal Records in 2004. This was followed by their second album Ein neuer Tag which peaked at number one on the German Albums Chart in October 2006. Juli's third album In Love was released in September 2010 and yielded two singles.

== Albums ==
=== Studio albums ===
List of studio albums, with selected chart positions and certifications
Title	Album details	Peak chart positions			Certifications
Title	Album details	GER	AUT	SWI	Certifications
Es ist Juli	Released: 20 September 2004; Label: Universal; Format: CD, digital download	2	4	7	AUT: Platinum; GER: 3× Platinum; SWI: Platinum
Ein neuer Tag	Released: 13 October 2006; Label: Universal; Formats: CD, LP, digital download	1	4	3	
In Love	Released: 17 September 2010; Label: Universal; Formats: CD, LP, digital download	4	17	33	GER: Gold
Insel	Released: 3 October 2014; Label: Universal; Formats: CD, LP, digital download	10	66	73	
Der Sommer ist vorbei	Released: 28 April 2023; Label: Polydor; Formats: CD, LP, digital download	9	—	—	

=== Live albums ===
List of live albums, with selected chart positions
Title	Album details	Peak chart positions		
Title	Album details	GER	AUT	SWI
Ein neuer Tag – live	Released: 28 September 2007; Label: Universal; Formats: CD, DVD	24	—	—

== Singles ==
List of singles, with selected chart positions, showing year released and album name
Year	Title	Peak chart positions					Album
Year	Title	GER	AUT	SWI	EUR	WORLD	Album
2004	"Perfekte Welle"	2	2	18	9	77	Es ist Juli
2004	"Geile Zeit"	19	11	32	64	83	Es ist Juli
2005	"Regen und Meer"	31	20	—	—	—	Es ist Juli
2005	"Warum"	47	52	—	—	—	Es ist Juli
2005	"November"	49	—	—	—	—	Es ist Juli
2006	"Dieses Leben"	5	7	22	14	—	Ein neuer Tag
2006	"Wir beide"	23	55	—	106	—	Ein neuer Tag
2007	"Zerrissen"	15	22	—	52	—	Ein neuer Tag
2007	"Ein neuer Tag"	85	—	—	—	—	Ein neuer Tag
2010	"Elektrisches Gefühl"	12	21	—	46	—	In Love
2010	"Immer wenn es dunkel wird"	37	—	—	—	—	In Love
2011	"Süchtig"	35	—	—	—	—	In Love
2011	"Du lügst so schön"	67	—	—	—	—	In Love
2014	"Insel"	74	—	—	—	—	Insel
2014	"Jetzt"	—	—	—	—	—	Insel
2014	"Eines Tages"	—	—	—	—	—	Insel
2019	"Fahrrad"	—	—	—	—	—	TBA
"—" denotes releases that did not chart.

=== As featured artist ===
Single	Year	Peak chart positions		Album
Single	Year	GER	EU	Album
"Stolen" (Dashboard Confessional featuring Juli)	2007	15	46	Dusk and Summer

== Music videos ==
Year	Title	Director(s)
2004	"Perfekte Welle"	Hans Hammers Jr. II
2004	"Geile Zeit"	Daniel Lwowski
2005	"Regen und Meer"	Bernd Possardt, Jeffery Lisk
2005	"Warum"	Hans Hammers Jr. II
2006	"Dieses Leben"	Moritz Laube
2006	"Wir beide"	Bernd Possardt, Jeffery Lisk
2007	"Zerrissen"	Oleg Assadulin
2007	"Ein neuer Tag"	Hans Hammers Jr. II
2007	"Stolen" (with Dashboard Confessional)	
2010	"Elektrisches Gefühl"	Chris Wendland
2010	"Immer wenn es dunkel wird"	Hagen Decker
2011	"Süchtig"	Hagen Decker
2011	"Du lügst so schön"	Sven Sindt
