= List of songs in Rock Band =

Rock Band is a 2007 music video game developed by Harmonix and distributed by MTV Games and Electronic Arts. The game is available for the Xbox 360, PlayStation 2, PlayStation 3, and Wii game consoles. Rock Band is based on Harmonix's previous success with the Guitar Hero series of video games in which players used a guitar-shaped controller to simulate playing rock music. Rock Band expands on the concept by adding a drum and microphone peripheral, allowing up to four players to participate in the game, playing lead and bass guitar, drums, and vocals. The gameplay in Rock Band is comparable to that in Guitar Hero along with elements from Harmonix's Karaoke Revolution.

Rock Band for the Xbox 360 and PlayStation 2 and 3 shipped with 58 songs on disc, while the Wii version, released at a later date, contained 5 additional songs that were released as downloadable content for the game. The European version of the game also includes 9 additional songs that have since been released as downloadable content for other regions. The player can expand their music library on the Xbox 360 and PlayStation 3 versions by purchasing new songs offered on a weekly basis through the consoles' respective store systems. A full list of downloadable songs is available. For the PlayStation 2 and Wii versions of Rock Band, Harmonix has created Rock Band Track Packs that contain a selection of the downloadable content already offered.

With Rock Band 2 and Rock Band 3, Xbox 360 and PlayStation 3 players can export a majority of songs from the Rock Band soundtrack to their console's storage device by purchasing a "transfer license". Additionally, certain songs rated as "Family Friendly" by Harmonix are playable in Lego Rock Band. "Enter Sandman", "Monsoon", "Paranoid" and "Run to the Hills" cannot be exported to any other game in the series. The original recording of "Run to the Hills" was made available as a downloadable single and also in Iron Maiden Pack 01 on June 9, 2009. While initially not exportable to Rock Band 3, "Black Hole Sun" and "Dani California" were made available via a patch released on November 8, 2011. On the European version, "Hier Kommt Alex" and "Rock 'n' Roll Star" can be exported to Rock Band 2 but not Rock Band 3. Exports of the Rock Band soundtrack (with the above exclusions) into Rock Band 4, for those that have already exported them into Rock Band 2 or 3, was enabled in January 2016.

== Main setlist ==
Players can play Rock Band alone through a Career mode for lead guitar, drums, and vocals, earning in-game money for their character to purchase new outfits and instruments. Each of the 45 songs has a different difficulty ranking for each instrument part, as well as a total band difficulty. There are a total of nine difficulties, or tiers. In career mode each song in a tier must be successfully completed to move onto the next and unlock the songs in that tier. This tier system is also used for rating the difficulty of the song (the "Band" tier) and its separate instrumental parts for downloadable content even though the songs are not used to unlock new songs in career mode. Once songs are unlocked, they may be played in any mode, including Quickplay, and multiplayer (competitive and co-operative modes) off- or online. Each instrument part in each song can be played at one of four difficulty levels, which include Easy, Medium, Hard, and Expert.

Song titles listed in bold utilize master recordings.

Song title	Artist	Year	Genre	Exportable	Family Friendly	Rewind DLC
**"Are You Gonna Be My Girl"**	**Jet**	2003	Rock	Yes	No	No
"Ballroom Blitz (Cover)"	Sweet	1973	Glam	Yes	Yes	No
**"Black Hole Sun"**	**Soundgarden**	1994	Grunge	Yes	No	No
**"Blitzkrieg Bop"**	**Ramones**	1976	Punk	Yes	Yes	No
**"Celebrity Skin"**	**Hole**	1998	Pop/Rock	Yes	No	No
**"Cherub Rock"**	**Smashing Pumpkins**	1993	Alternative	Yes	Yes	Yes
**"Creep"**	**Radiohead**	1992	Alternative	Yes	No	Yes
**"Dani California"**	**Red Hot Chili Peppers**	2006	Alternative	Yes	No	No
**"Dead on Arrival"**	**Fall Out Boy**	2003	Pop/Rock	Yes	Yes	Yes
**"Detroit Rock City"**	**Kiss**	1976	Classic Rock	Yes	No	No
**"(Don't Fear) The Reaper"**	**Blue Öyster Cult**	1976	Classic Rock	Yes	Yes	Yes
**"Electric Version"**	**The New Pornographers**	2003	Indie Rock	Yes	No	No
**"Enter Sandman"**	**Metallica**	1991	Metal	No	No	No
**"Epic"**	**Faith No More**	1989	Rock	Yes	Yes	No
**"Flirtin' with Disaster"**	**Molly Hatchet**	1979	Southern Rock	Yes	No	No
**"Foreplay/Long Time"**	**Boston**	1977	Classic Rock	Yes	Yes	Yes
**"Gimme Shelter"**	**The Rolling Stones**	1969	Classic Rock	Yes	No	No
**"Go with the Flow"**	**Queens of the Stone Age**	2002	Alternative	Yes	Yes	Yes
"Green Grass and High Tides (Cover)"	The Outlaws	1975	Southern Rock	Yes	Yes	No
**"Here It Goes Again"**	**OK Go**	2005	Pop/Rock	Yes	No	No
**"Highway Star"**	**Deep Purple**	1972	Classic Rock	Yes	No	No
**"I Think I'm Paranoid"**	**Garbage**	1998	Alternative	Yes	No	No
**"In Bloom"**	**Nirvana**	1991	Grunge	Yes	No	No
**"Learn to Fly"**	**Foo Fighters**	1999	Alternative	Yes	No	Yes
**"Main Offender"**	**The Hives**	2000	Punk	Yes	No	No
**"Maps"**	**Yeah Yeah Yeahs**	2003	Indie Rock	Yes	Yes	No
"Mississippi Queen (Cover)"	Mountain	1970	Southern Rock	Yes	No	No
**"Next to You"**	**The Police**	1978	Rock	Yes	No	No
**"Orange Crush"**	**R.E.M.**	1988	Alternative	Yes	No	No
"Paranoid (Cover)"	Black Sabbath	1970	Metal	No	No	No
**"Reptilia"**	**The Strokes**	2003	Rock	Yes	Yes	Yes
"Run to the Hills (Cover)"	Iron Maiden	1982	Metal	No	No	No (Note: Studio version available as regular DLC.)
**"Sabotage"**	**Beastie Boys**	1994	Rock	Yes	No	Yes
**"Say It Ain't So"**	**Weezer**	1994	Alternative	Yes	No	Yes
**"Should I Stay or Should I Go"**	**The Clash**	1982	Punk	Yes	No	No
**"Suffragette City"**	**David Bowie**	1972	Glam	Yes	Yes	Yes
**"The Hand That Feeds"**	**Nine Inch Nails**	2005	Rock	Yes	No	Yes
"Tom Sawyer (Cover)"	Rush	1981	Progressive	Yes	Yes	No
"Train Kept A-Rollin' (Cover)"	Aerosmith	1974	Rock	Yes	No	No
**"Vasoline"**	**Stone Temple Pilots**	1994	Alternative	Yes	No	Yes
**"Wanted Dead or Alive"**	**Bon Jovi**	1986	Rock	Yes	Yes	Yes
**"Wave of Mutilation"**	**Pixies**	1989	Alternative	Yes	No	No
**"Welcome Home"**	**Coheed and Cambria**	2005	Progressive	Yes	No	Yes
**"When You Were Young"**	**The Killers**	2006	Alternative	Yes	No	Yes
**"Won't Get Fooled Again"**	**The Who**	1971	Classic Rock	Yes	Yes	Yes

== Bonus songs ==
A total of 13 bonus songs can also be unlocked through the game's Career mode. The bonus setlist consists of bands formed by Harmonix employees as well as local bands from near Harmonix's headquarters in Cambridge, Massachusetts, or from Boston. The exceptions are Flyleaf, Crooked X, and Mother Hips. "Timmy and the Lords of the Underworld" comes from the titular fictional band featured in the comedy show South Park.

Song title	Artist	Decade	Genre	Family Friendly	Rewind DLC
"29 Fingers"	The Konks	2000s	Rock	Yes	No
"Blood Doll"	Anarchy Club	2000s	Metal	No	Yes
"Brainpower"	Freezepop	2000s	Pop/Rock	No	Yes
"Can't Let Go"	Death of the Cool	2000s	Rock	Yes	Yes
"Day Late, Dollar Short"	The Acro-Brats	2000s	Rock	No	Yes
"I Get By"	Honest Bob and the Factory to Dealer Incentives	2000s	Indie Rock	Yes	Yes
"I'm So Sick"	Flyleaf	2000s	Nu-Metal	No	No
"Nightmare"	Crooked X	2000s	Rock	Yes	No
"Outside"	Tribe	1990s	Rock	Yes	Yes
"Pleasure (Pleasure)"	Bang Camaro	2000s	Rock	Yes	Yes
"Seven"	Vagiant	2000s	Punk	No	Yes
"Time We Had"	The Mother Hips	2000s	Rock	Yes	No
"Timmy and the Lords of the Underworld"	Timmy and the Lords of the Underworld	2000s	Rock	No	No

== Wii version ==
The Wii version of Rock Band features 5 additional songs originally released as downloadable content on the PlayStation 3 and Xbox 360 versions of the game.

Song title	Artist	Decade	Genre	Family Friendly
"Dirty Little Secret"	The All-American Rejects	2000s	Emo	Yes
"Don't Look Back in Anger"	Oasis	1990s	Rock	Yes
"Roam"	The B-52's	1980s	Pop/Rock	Yes
"Rockaway Beach"	Ramones	1970s	Punk	Yes
"Roxanne"	The Police	1970s	Pop/Rock	No

== European version ==
The European versions of Rock Band features nine additional songs not available on the North American disc. These bonus songs include English, German, and French vocals. These songs were released as downloadable content in the North American market on May 20, 2008. The European Wii version contains 14 additional songs compared to the launch versions due to containing both sets of extra songs.

Song title	Artist	Language	Decade	Genre	Exportable	Family Friendly
"Beetlebum (Cover)"	Blur	English	1990s	Alternative	Yes	No
"Countdown to Insanity"	H-Blockx	English	2000s	Rock	Yes	No
"Hier Kommt Alex"	Die Toten Hosen	German	1980s	Punk	Rock Band 2 only	No
"Hysteria"	Muse	English	2000s	Alternative	Yes	Yes
"Manu Chao"	Les Wampas	French	2000s	Punk	Yes	No
"Monsoon"	Tokio Hotel	English	2000s	Glam	No	Yes
"New Wave"	Pleymo	French	2000s	Metal	Yes	No
"Perfekte Welle"	Juli	German	2000s	Rock	Yes	No
"Rock 'n' Roll Star"	Oasis	English	1990s	Rock	Rock Band 2 only	Yes
