= Live Earth concert, Hamburg =

Live Earth
- Hamburg Concert location
Location	HSH Nordbank Arena, Hamburg, Germany
Founded by	Al Gore and Kevin Wall
Date	7 July 2007
Genre(s)	Pop and Rock music
Website	Live Earth Germany site

The Live Earth concert in Germany was held at HSH Nordbank Arena, Hamburg on 7 July 2007.

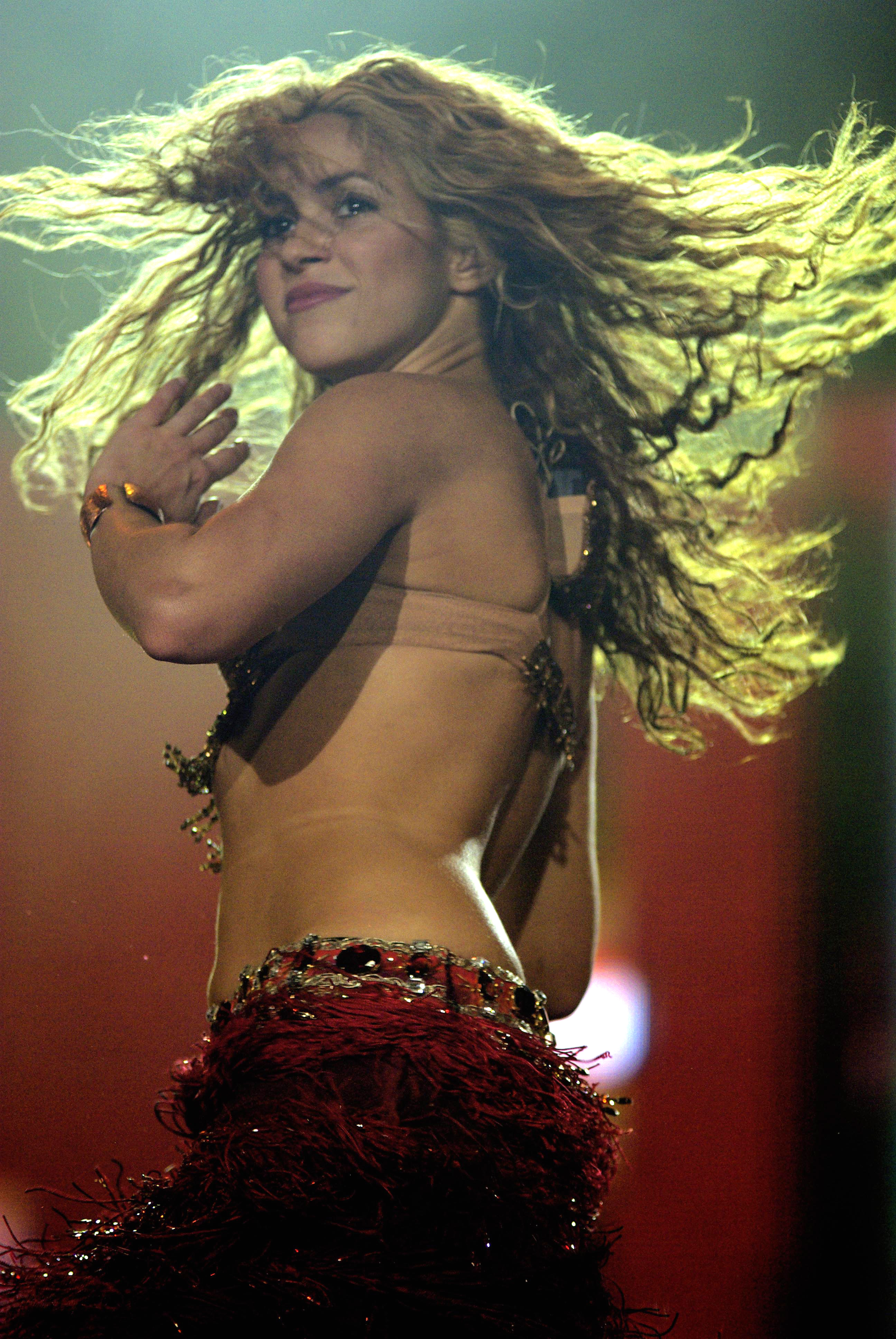
Shakira was headliner of the show.

== Running order ==
In order of appearance:

- Shakira - "Don't Bother", "Inevitable", "Dia Especial" with Gustavo Cerati, "Hips Don't Lie" (HSH 13:05)
- Snoop Dogg- "The Next Episode", "Ups & Downs", "Snoop's Upside Ya Head" "I Wanna Love You" (solo), "Drop It Like It's Hot", "Who Am I (What's My Name)?" (HSH 13:40)
- Roger Cicero - "Kompromisse","Frauen regier'n die Welt", "Zieh die Schuh aus" (HSH 14:05)
- MIA. - "Tanz der Moleküle", "Engel" (HSH 14:30)
- Sasha - "Coming Home", "Chemical Reaction", "Lucky Day" (HSH 14:55)
- Stefan Gwildis - "Tanzen Übern Kiez", "Wie ein richtiger Mensch" (HSH 15:20)
- Marquess - "El Temperamento", "Vayamos Companeros" (HSH 15:45)
- Maria Mena - "Sorry", "Just Hold Me", "What a Wonderful World" (HSH 16:10)
- Silbermond - "Lebenszeichen", "Zeit für Optimisten" (HSH 16:35)
- Michael Mittermeier - "Stand Up Comedy" (HSH 16:55)
- Reamonn with Ritmo Del Mundo - "Serpentine", "Tonight (with Buena Vista Social Club)" (HSH 17:20)
- Samy Deluxe - "Let's Go", "Weck Mick Auf" (HSH 17:42)
- Enrique Iglesias - "Be With You", "Bailamos", "Don't You (Forget About Me)", "Escape" (HSH 18:10)
- Katie Melua - "Nine Million Bicycles", "On the Road Again", "Spider's Web" and "Thankyou, Stars" (HSH 18:45)
- Jan Delay - "Klar", "Türlich" with Das Bo, "Feuer" (HSH 19:20)
- Lotto King Karl - "Glaube Liebe Hoffnung", "Hamburg meine Perle" (HSH 19:50)
- Revolverheld - "Ich werd die Welt verändern", "Freunde bleiben" (HSH 20:15)
- Mando Diao - "Ode To Ochrasy", "Long Before Rock 'n' Roll" (HSH 20:40)
- Juli - "Zerrissen", "Wir beide", "Perfekte Welle" (HSH 21:05)
- Chris Cornell - "You Know My Name", "Arms Around Your Love", "Wide Awake", "Black Hole Sun" (HSH 21:30)
- Cat Stevens/Yusuf Islam - "Where Do the Children Play?", "Midday", "Ruins", "Wild World", "Saturn", "Peace Train" (HSH 21:45)

== Presenters ==
- Katarina Witt
- Nova Meierhenrich
- Bianca Jagger
- Gülcan
- Elton
- Tim Mälzer
- Stefan Gödde

== Notes ==
- Snoop Dogg performed the song "The Next Episode" in his set. A few hours earlier Xzibit had performed the same song in the Tokyo concert.

== Coverage ==
=== Television ===
N24 and Pro7 did the television live coverage.

=== Online ===
MSN were responsible for the online broadcasting of the concert.
