= Elektrisches Gefühl =

Single by Juli

from the album In Love
- Released: 27 August 2010
- Genre: Pop rock; pop
- Length: 3:43
- Label: Polydor; Island
- Songwriters: Simon Triebel; Eva Briegel
- Producers: Olaf Opal; Tobias Siebert

Juli singles chronology
"Ein neuer Tag" (2007)	"Elektrisches Gefühl" (2010)	"Immer wenn es dunkel wird" (2010)

"Elektrisches Gefühl" (English: "Electrical Feeling") is a song by German band Juli. It was written by band members Simon Triebel and Eva Briegel for their third studio album, In Love (2010).

== Track listings ==
Standard edition

1. "Elektrisches Gefühl" – 3:43
2. "Elektrisches Gefühl" (Acoustic Version) – 3:15

== Charts ==
Chart (2010)	Peak position
Austria (Ö3 Austria Top 40)	21
Germany (GfK)	12
