= Dieses Leben =

Single by Juli

from the album Ein neuer Tag
- Released: 22 September 2006
- Genre: Pop rock; pop
- Length: 4:34
- Songwriters: Andreas Herde; Eva Briegel; Jonas Pfetzing; Simon Triebel
- Producer: O.L.A.F. Opal

Juli singles chronology
"November" (2005)	"Dieses Leben" (2006)	"Wir beide" (2006)

"Dieses Leben" (English: "This Life") is a song by German band Juli. It was written by band members Jonas Pfetzing, Simon Triebel, Eva Briegel, and Andreas Herde for their second album Ein neuer Tag (2006), while production was overseen by O.L.A.F. Opal.

== Formats and track listings ==
CD maxi single
No.	Title	Length
1.	"Dieses Leben" (Radio Version)	3:55
2.	"Dieses Leben" (Album Version)	4:34
3.	"Dieses Leben" (Jan Driver Remix)	5:10
4.	"Dieses Leben" (August Rmx)	3:42

== Charts ==
=== Weekly charts ===
Chart (2006)	Peak position
Austria (Ö3 Austria Top 40)	7
Germany (GfK)	5
Germany Airplay (BVMI)	3
Switzerland (Schweizer Hitparade)	22

=== Year-end charts ===
Chart (2006)	Position
Germany (Official German Charts)	66
