= November (song) =

Single by Juli

from the album Es ist Juli
- Released: 2005
- Genre: Pop rock; pop
- Length: 2:20
- Songwriters: Eva Briegel; Jonas Pfetzing; Simon Triebel
- Producer: O.L.A.F. Opal

Juli singles chronology
"Warum" (2005)	"November" (2005)	"Dieses Leben" (2006)

"November" is a song by German band Juli. It was written by band members Simon Triebel, Jonas Pfetzing, and Eva Briegel and produced by O.L.A.F. Opal for their debut album Es ist Juli (2004). The song served as the fifth and final release from the album. The physical single was limited to 6,000 copies, each with a unique serial number (as visible in the cover).

== Charts ==
Chart (2005)	Peak position
Germany (GfK)	2
