= Shine4 =

South African pop music group

- Origin: South Africa
- Genre: Pop music
- Years active: 2001–2008
- Label: Sony Music Africa
- Past members: Desirèe Underwood; Jill Middlekop; Marlese Kapp; Liesl Kriel

Shine4 was a South African music group formed in January 2001. They were described as the world's first Afrikaans girl group. Shine4 are known for such songs as Mama ek wil 'n man he, Perfekte Wêreld and Ramaja (originally by Glenys Lynne). They performed at the Kokoriba Campfire Music Festival.

After releasing three albums in seven years, Shine 4 announced their disbandment in 2008. To conclude their career, they released a compilation album of their greatest hits titled Sien Jou Weer (Grootste Hits). They briefly reunited in 2024.

The group consisted of four female singers: Desirèe Underwood, Jill Middlekop, Marlese Kapp and Liesl Kriel.

== Career ==
Shine4 recorded several Afrikaans covers of songs including "Perfekte Welle" by Juli as "Perfekte Wêreld" and "Something Kinda Ooooh" by Girls Aloud as ''Ietsie Binne My''.

== Discography ==
Shine4 recorded 3 studio albums.

=== Studio albums ===
- 2001: Begin
- 2005: Perfekte wêreld
- 2007: So elektries

=== Compilation albums ===
- 2008: Grootste hits (sien jou weer)
- 2010: Perfekte wêreld / so elektries 2CD

=== DVDs ===
- 2007: Shine 4 - Die Grootste Treffers (DVD)
- Now it's Christmas (2005)

== See also ==
- List of South African music groups
