= Warum =

Single by Juli

from the album Es ist Juli
- Released: 2005
- Genre: Pop rock; pop
- Length: 3:46
- Songwriters: Eva Briegel; Simon Triebel
- Producer: O.L.A.F. Opal

Juli singles chronology
"Regen und Meer" (2005)	"Warum" (2005)	"November" (2005)

"Warum" (English: "Why") is a song by German band Juli. It was written by band members Simon Triebel and Eva Briegel and produced by O.L.A.F. Opal for their debut album Es ist Juli (2004). The song was the fourth single release from the album.

== Formats and track listings ==
CD maxi single
No.	Title	Length
1.	"Warum" (Single Radio Version)	3:45
2.	"Warum" (Album Version)	3:46
3.	"Warum" (J.U.L.I. Remix)	3:34
4.	"Sterne" (De-Phazz Pounding Dub Version)	4:21

== Charts ==
Chart (2005)	Peak position
Austria (Ö3 Austria Top 40)	52
Germany (GfK)	47
