= Regen und Meer =

Single by Juli

from the album Es ist Juli
- Released: 2005
- Genre: Pop rock; pop
- Length: 3:36
- Songwriters: Eva Briegel; Jonas Pfetzing; Diane Weigmann
- Producer: O.L.A.F. Opal

Juli singles chronology
"Geile Zeit" (2004)	"Regen und Meer" (2005)	"Warum" (2005)

"Regen und Meer" (English: "Rain and Sea") is a song by German band Juli. It was written by band members Jonas Pfetzing and Eva Briegel along with singer Diane Weigmann for their debut album, Es ist Juli (2004), while production was helmed by O.L.A.F. Opal.

== Formats and track listings ==
CD maxi single
No.	Title	Length
1.	"Regen und Meer" (Single Version)	3:38
2.	"Regen und Meer" (Album Version)	3:37
3.	"Regen und Meer" (Jetzt 18% Mehr Version)	4:08
4.	"November" (J.U.L.I. Remix)	3:08

== Charts ==
Chart (2005)	Peak position
Austria (Ö3 Austria Top 40)	52
Germany (GfK)	31
