= Klar =

Klar is a family name. Notable people with the surname include:

- Amar Klar (1947–2017), Indian-American geneticist
- Barbara Klar (born 1966), Canadian poet
- Christian Klar (born 1952), German assassin
- Gary Howard Klar (1947–2020), American actor
- Michael Klar (1943–2023), German graphic artist
- Samara Klar, American political scientist
