= In Love (Juli album) =

Studio album by Juli
- Released: 17 September 2010
- Length: 47:45
- Label: Polydor; Island
- Producer: Olaf Opal; Tobias Siebert

Juli chronology
Ein neuer Tag (2006)	In Love (2010)	Insel (2014)

In Love is the third studio album by German band Juli. It was released on 17 September 2010 by Polydor and Island Records.

== Critical reception ==
Professional ratings
Review scores
Source	Rating
laut.de	4/5 stars

Artur Schulz from laut.de called In Love a "good job." He wrote that "where others light bright, cheeky song torches, Eva and Co.'s soulful music candlelight shines in the rustling autumn leaves at dusk. In Love consistently takes the next step: in these songs we are mostly in the dead of night."

== Track listing ==
In Love track listing
No.	Title	Writer(s)	Length
1.	"Immer wenn es dunkel wird"	Jonas Pfetzing; Simon Triebel; Eva Briegel	4:10
2.	"Süchtig"	Triebel; Briegel	3:46
3.	"Eisenherz"	Pfetzing; Briegel	4:35
4.	"Woanders zu Hause"	Pfetzing; Briegel	4:32
5.	"Mit verbundenen Augen"	Pfetzing; Triebel	3:08
6.	"Elektrisches Gefühl"	Triebel; Briegel	3:42
7.	"Ich bin in Love (Paris)"	Pfetzing; Briegel	3:41
8.	"Du lügst so schön"	Pfetzing; Triebel; Briegel; Naima Husseini	4:33
9.	"Maschinen"	Triebel; Marcel Römer	3:53
10.	"Jessica"	Pfetzing; Briegel	4:21
11.	"Die Sterne fallen"	Triebel; Frank Harland	3:33
12.	"Seenot"	Pfetzing; Briegel; Dedi Herde	3:46
Total length:			47:45

== Charts ==
=== Weekly charts ===
Weekly chart performance for In Love
Chart (2010)	Peak position
Austrian Albums (Ö3 Austria)	17
German Albums (Offizielle Top 100)	4
Swiss Albums (Schweizer Hitparade)	33

=== Year-end charts ===
Year-end chart performance for In Love
Chart (2010)	Position
German Albums (Offizielle Top 100)	97

== Certifications ==
Certifications for In Love
Region	Certification	Certified units/sales
Germany (BVMI)	Gold	100,000^{^}
^{^} Shipments figures based on certification alone.

== Release history ==
Release history for In Love
Region	Date	Format	Label	Ref.
Various	17 September 2010	Digital download; CD	Polydor; Island	
