= Timmy and the Lords of the Underworld =

Single by Timmy and the Lords of the Underworld
- B-side: "Timmy Livin' a Lie"
- Released: September 5, 2000
- Genre: Heavy metal, comedy rock
- Length: 2:22
- Label: American • Columbia
- Songwriters: Bruce Howell, Trey Parker
- Producers: Bruce Howell; Executive Producers; Trey Parker, Matt Stone

"Timmy and the Lords of the Underworld" is a self-titled single released on September 9, 2000 by the creators of South Park featured in the episode "Timmy 2000". The song appears in the music video game Rock Band as a playable track and is exportable for play in later games in the series. In September 2015, it was named the 38th best fictional song of all time by Spin.

== Background ==
The single was originally from the episode Timmy 2000. Handicapped Timmy Burch forms his own band after being excused from homework due to ADD. The song opens with a short skit featuring the characters Timmy, Stan Marsh, and Mr. Garrison.

== Tracks and personnel ==
There are two sides of the record:

| No. | Title | Length |
|---|---|---|
| 1. | "Timmy and the Lords of the Underworld" | 2:22 |
| 2. | "Timmy Livin' a Lie" | 2:29 |

A list of personnel who performed in the song:

- Bass, Vocals – Matt Stone, co-creator of South Park
- Timmy – Trey Parker, co-creator of South Park
- Drums – Curt Bisquera, studio drummer
- Engineer – Joe Schiff
- Executive Producer – Matt Stone, Trey Parker
- Guitar – Bruce Howell
- Keyboards – D. A. Young
- Mastered By – Dave Mitson
- Mixed By – Bruce Howell, Joe Schiff
- Performer – Trey Parker
- Producer – Bruce Howell
- Written-By – Bruce Howell, Trey Parker

== Reception ==
The song quickly became popular in the video game Rock Band, as a bonus song.

IGN also highlighted the song when mentioning each of the bonus songs in the game.

Spin magazine labeled the song as the 38th best fictional song of all time.

A stop-start groove and bouncing bass line better than any real turn-of-the-century modern-rock hit, fronted by the rare period frontman who never became overbearing in his verbosity. Don't sleep on the backing Lords, though, who sum up goth-rock in one line better than the entire South Park episode on the subject.

— Andrew Unterberger, The 50 Best Fictional Songs of All Time,

== Copyright ==
The song shares copyright between Sony Music Entertainment and Comedy Central. However, it was published by Hilarity Music Inc.
