= Insel (album) =

Studio album by Juli
- Released: 3 October 2014
- Genre: Pop, electro, rock
- Length: 46:02
- Label: Polydor; Island
- Producer: O.L.A.F. Opal; Marcel Römer; Philipp Steinke; Juli

Juli chronology
In Love (2010)	Insel (2014)	Der Sommer ist vorbei (2023)

Insel (German pronunciation: [ˈɪnzl̩], transl. Island) is the fourth studio album by German band Juli. It was released on 3 October 2014 by Polydor and Island Records.

== Critical reception ==
Professional ratings
Review scores
Source	Rating
laut.de	3/5 stars

laut.de editor Kai Butterweck found that with Insel "Juli are on their own island: with largely cliché-free lyrics and detailed arranged sound symbioses of pop, electro and rock – combined into a homogeneous whole."

== Track listing ==
Insel track listing
No.	Title	Writer(s)	Producer(s)	Length
1.	"Insel"	Jonas Pfetzing; Simon Triebel; Eva Briegel	O.L.A.F. Opal; Philipp Steinke; Marcel Römer	4:10
2.	"Wenn sich alles bewegt"	Pfetzing; Triebel; Briegel	Opal; Juli	4:43
3.	"Wasserfall"	Pfetzing; Triebel; Briegel	Opal; Juli	3:20
4.	"Nichts brauchen"	Pfetzing; Triebel; Briegel	Opal; Römer	3:33
5.	"Eines Tages"	Pfetzing; Triebel; Briegel	Opal; Juli	3:50
6.	"Hallo Hallo"	Römer; Briegel	Opal; Römer	4:00
7.	"Jetzt"	Pfetzing; Triebel; Briegel	Opal; Juli	3:07
8.	"2004"	Pfetzing; Triebel; Briegel	Opal; Juli	4:15
9.	"Es ist nicht viel"	Pfetzing; Triebel; Briegel; Jonas Schubert	Opal; Juli	3:47
10.	"Plattenbau"	Pfetzing; Triebel; Briegel	Opal; Juli	3:27
11.	"Wenn das alles ist"	Pfetzing; Triebel; Briegel	Opal; Juli	2:34
12.	"So fest ich kann"	Pfetzing; Triebel; Briegel	Opal; Juli	5:11
Total length:				46:02

== Charts ==
Weekly chart performance for Insel
Chart (2014)	Peak position
Austrian Albums (Ö3 Austria)	66
German Albums (Offizielle Top 100)	10
Swiss Albums (Schweizer Hitparade)	73

== Release history ==
Release history and formats for Insel
Region	Date	Format	Label	Ref.
Various	3 October 2014	Digital download; CD	Polydor; Island	
