= Wir beide =

Single by Juli

from the album Ein neuer Tag
- Released: 2006
- Genre: Pop rock; pop
- Length: 2:59
- Songwriters: Eva Briegel; Jonas Pfetzing
- Producer: O.L.A.F. Opal

Juli singles chronology
"Dieses Leben" (2006)	"Wir beide" (2006)	"Zerrissen" (2007)

"Wir beide" (English: "The Two of Us") is a song by German band Juli. It was written by band members Jonas Pfetzing, and Eva Briegel for their second studio album Ein neuer Tag (2006), while production was overseen by O.L.A.F. Opal.

== Charts ==
Chart (2006)	Peak position
Austria (Ö3 Austria Top 40)	55
Germany (GfK)	23
Germany Airplay (BVMI)	5
