= Der Sommer ist vorbei =

Studio album by Juli
- Released: 28 April 2023
- Genre: Pop rock
- Length: 50:38
- Label: Polydor

Juli chronology
| Insel (2014) | Der Sommer ist vorbei (2023) |

Der Sommer ist vorbei (transl. The Summer Is Over) is the fifth studio album by German band Juli. It was released on 28 April 2023 by Polydor. Their first album in a decade, it debuted and peaked at number 9 on the German Albums Chart.

== Critical reception ==
Professional ratings
Review scores
| Source | Rating |
|---|---|
| laut.de | 2/5 stars |

laut.de editor Sven Kabelitz found that "there is nothing really interesting or even surprising on the fifth July album. Der Sommer ist vorbei offers what you expect: plainly arranged everyday pop-rock, which only stands out compared to other acts in the genre thanks to its melancholy, which is deeply rooted in the music. With each additional song it becomes clear how interchangeable the previous one was and how little the band has to offer lyrically. Ultimately, this once again illustrates what it was all about in 2004. Seen this way, they are returning to their old strength."

== Track listing ==
Der Sommer ist vorbei track listing
| No. | Title | Writer(s) | Length |
|---|---|---|---|
| 1. | "Der Sommer ist vorbei" | Eva Briegel; Joe Walter; Jonas Pfetzing; Simon Triebel | 3:09 |
| 2. | "Traurige Lieder" | Briegel; Walter; Pfetzing; Triebel | 3:15 |
| 3. | "Fette wilde Jahre" | Briegel; Pfetzing; Triebel | 3:03 |
| 4. | "Die besten Dinge" | Aki Bosse; Briegel; Pfetzing; Marcel Römer; Triebel; Pascal Reinhardt | 3:00 |
| 5. | "Vier Wände" | Briegel; Pfetzing; Römer; Triebel; Pascal Reinhardt | 3:11 |
| 6. | "Irgendwann" | Briegel; Pfetzing; Römer; Triebel; Reinhardt | 3:11 |
| 7. | "Gehen oder bleiben" | Briegel; Pfetzing; Triebel | 3:17 |
| 8. | "Fahrrad" | Briegel; Pfetzing; Triebel; Reinhardt | 3:05 |
| 9. | "Wolke" | Briegel; Pfetzing; Triebel | 4:35 |
| 10. | "Alles geht weiter" | Briegel; Pfetzing; Triebel | 3:18 |
| 11. | "In unseren Händen" | Briegel; Pfetzing; Steinke; Triebel | 3:42 |
| Total length: | | | 50:38 |

== Charts ==
Weekly chart performance for Der Sommer ist vorbei
| Chart (2014) | Peak position |
|---|---|
| German Albums (Offizielle Top 100) | 9 |

== Release history ==
Release history and formats for Der Sommer ist vorbei
| Region | Date | Format | Edition(s) | Label | Ref. |
|---|---|---|---|---|---|
| Various | 28 April 2023 | Digital download; CD; streaming | Standard | Polydor | |
| Various | 19 April 2024 | Digital download; CD; streaming | Deluxe | Polydor | |
