= Timmy 2000 =

- South Park episode
- Episode no.: Season 4 Episode 3
- Directed by: Trey Parker
- Written by: Trey Parker
- Production code: 404
- Original air date: April 19, 2000

Episode chronology
← Previous "Cartman's Silly Hate Crime 2000"	Next → "Quintuplets 2000"
- South Park season 4

"Timmy 2000" (the third of four episodes titled after the "2000" fad) is the 3rd episode of the fourth season of the American animated television series South Park, and the 51st episode of the series overall. It originally aired on April 19, 2000. The episode is rated TV-MA in the United States and has a 12 certificate in the United Kingdom.

== Plot ==
The boys have a new fellow student in their class, the mentally and physically handicapped Timmy, who is only capable of saying his own name, the phrase "libalah", and otherwise a very limited number of words. Mr. Garrison and Principal Victoria do not realize the extent of Timmy's handicaps, and Mr. Mackey suggests that Timmy may have ADD. They send him to a doctor who diagnoses him in a very odd fashion (reading The Great Gatsby in its entirety, then asking one random question about a mundane detail from the book). Timmy is then freed from all homework and schoolwork questions, leading all the other kids in the class to claim that they also have ADD in an attempt to get out of their homework. They are all promptly diagnosed with the condition using a similar method as Timmy, and they are all prescribed Ritalin as a result.

Without the burden of homework, Timmy finds a new pastime as he is discovered by The Lords of the Underworld (the rock band consisting of Shelley Marsh's ex-boyfriend, Skyler, and his two friends, as seen in the season three "Cat Orgy"), which takes him on as its new lead singer. The band becomes instantly successful due to Timmy's antics. However, many people are upset as they think that Timmy is being ridiculed. Phil Collins in particular is displeased with the new band, which has been booked to open for him at the Lalapalalapaza festival. Shortly after, Timmy and the Lords of the Underworld (at this point only referred to as "Timmy") take Collins's place as the headliners of the festival.

The other boys have actually started to take their Ritalin medication, making them very calm and rather boring. Cartman develops a side effect from Ritalin that causes him to see pink Christina Aguilera monsters (one of which causes him to accidentally kill Kenny). The adults are uncomfortable among them, but accept their new kind and obedient children when they also start taking Ritalin. Chef and the pharmacists are the only people left who are not under the drug's influence.

Meanwhile, Phil Collins tries to break up Timmy and the Lords of the Underworld. First by appealing to Timmy's parents, Richard and Helen (who also have large heads, use wheelchairs, and unable to say anything other than their names), and later by telling the guitarist, Skyler, that Timmy is stealing his fame and is only holding Skyler back, reminiscing to his Genesis era. Skyler leaves the band, which is subsequently cancelled from the festival. Collins regains his headlining spot, and Skyler's solo project Reach for the Skyler is booked to open for him, but Skyler bails out.

In the meantime, Chef tries to convince the parents that there are other methods to fight ADD than medication, namely beating the children to force them to "sit down and study" from a doctor that does a bold-free treatment without medication, but as the parents are all taking Ritalin too, he does not get any help. After the boys come in and tell Chef that they want to go to the festival to see Phil Collins perform, Chef decides to go confront the pharmacist alone. As the pharmacist and doctor who prescribed the Ritalin are counting their profits, Chef angrily tells them that they are responsible for the children liking Collins. Horrified that they are responsible for this, they make a plan to distribute an antidote called "Ritalout" (which, in one scene, is in a bottle labeled MDMA) by mixing it into free drinks at the Lalapalalapaza festival. They get the drinks from a lemonade stand run by Mr. Derp (a minor character who appeared last in "The Succubus").

The plan works perfectly; all the symptoms of Ritalin wears off, Collins is booed from the stage, and the crowd starts chanting for Timmy. The band reunites with Skyler and they play their show. Timmy even learns the words to introduce the band properly. Collins is carried out of the arena via crowd surfing, with the position of the Oscar implied to have been inserted in his anus. This was shown in a segment which aired during the last 20 seconds of the episode.

== Cultural references ==
Phil Collins is always seen holding an Academy Award. This refers to his award in 1999 for best song, "You'll Be in My Heart" (referred to in the episode as "You'll Be in Me") from Disney's Tarzan, which won against a song from South Park: Bigger, Longer and Uncut, called "Blame Canada."

Collins' appearance and mannerisms in the episode are similar to the "Gumby" character as seen in Monty Python's Flying Circus, one of Stone and Parker's influences. The characters always mispronounce the name of Lollapalooza, a yearly music event. Kurt Loder is also parodied on an episode of MTV News. Loder ponders why he is still doing this and says, "I've got to be the oldest person on this network by at least 40 years." The MTV News logo is seen with its satellite orbiting the Earth and the announcer states how the network is so cool they decide what is cool. The announcer admits that MTV News and by default MTV proper has been single-handedly dumbing down America's youth since the 80s.

== Legacy ==
The song featured in this episode, "Timmy and the Lords of the Underworld", is a bonus song in Rock Band. It was also released as a standalone single.

== Production ==
As explained in the FAQ section on the official website, "When the year 2000 was coming up, everyone and their brother had '2000' in the titles of their products and TV shows. America was obsessed with 2000, so Trey Parker put '2000' in the titles to make fun of the ubiquity of the phrase. However the joke soon got old after the first four episodes so they decided to drop it."
