= Geile Zeit =

Single by Juli

from the album Es ist Juli
- Released: 2004
- Genre: Pop rock; pop
- Length: 4:06
- Songwriters: Jonas Pfetzing; Simon Triebel
- Producer: Andreas Herbig

Juli singles chronology
"Perfekte Welle" (2004)	"Geile Zeit" (2004)	"Regen und Meer" (2005)

"Geile Zeit" (English: "Great Time") is a song by German band Juli. It was written by band members Simon Triebel and Jonas Pfetzing and produced by Andreas Herbig for their debut album Es ist Juli (2004).

In 2005, Juli and the song represented Hesse in the Bundesvision Song Contest 2005, placing first with 159 points.

== Formats and track listings ==
CD maxi single
No.	Title	Length
1.	"Geile Zeit" (Radio Version)	3:35
2.	"Du drehst dich um"	2:32
3.	"Geile Zeit" (Album Version)	3:46
4.	"Geile Zeit" (Hacienda's Inhale And Exhale Mix)	6:18

== Charts ==
=== Weekly charts ===
Chart (2004)	Peak position
Austria (Ö3 Austria Top 40)	19
Germany (GfK)	19
Switzerland (Schweizer Hitparade)	32

=== Year-end charts ===
Chart (2005)	Position
Germany (Media Control GfK)	82
