= Es ist Juli =

Studio album by Juli
- Released: September 20, 2004
- Recorded: November 2003–January 2004
- Studio: Various: Mohrmann Studio, Bochum; Homestudio, Hamburg
- Genre: Pop rock
- Length: 42:20
- Label: Universal
- Producer: Engineer; O.L.A.F. Opal; Oli Zülch

Juli chronology
Es ist Juli (2004)	Ein neuer Tag (2006)

Es ist Juli (transl. It Is July) is the debut studio album by German band Juli. It was released on September 20, 2004 via Universal Records. The album debuted at number three on the German Albums Chart and later peaked at number 2. With more than 700,000 copies sold until March 2005, it gained triple platinum.

== Critical reception ==
Professional ratings
Review scores
Source	Rating
laut.de	4/5 stars

Philipp Gässlein from laut.de found that Es Ist Juli "presents itself as a homogeneous collection of beautiful, honestly crafted German pop pieces with an appropriate dash of rock to stand out from the crowd [...] What is certain is that Juli will release a similarly convincing debut work as Wir sind Helden did back then and will probably have a say in the next few years when it comes to chart-worthy music from Germany."

== Track listing ==
Es ist Juli track listing
No.	Title	Writer(s)	Length
1.	"Warum"	Simon Triebel; Eva Briegel	3:46
2.	"Sterne"	Triebel; Diane Weigmann	4:00
3.	"Geile Zeit"	Triebel; Jonas Pfetzing	4:06
4.	"Tage wie dieser"	Triebel	3:25
5.	"Tränenschwer"	Triebel; Diguardi; Briegel	3:27
6.	"Perfekte Welle"	Triebel; Andreas Herde	3:20
7.	"Regen und Meer"	Pfetzing; Weigmann; Briegel	3:36
8.	"November"	Pfetzing; Triebel; Briegel	2:59
9.	"Anders"	Keller; Triebel	3:09
10.	"Kurz vor der Sonne"	Heinz Herde; Triebel; Weigmann; Pfetzing; Briegel	3:15
11.	"Ich verschwinde"	Triebel; Pfetzing; Eva Briegel	3:40
12.	"Wenn du lachst"	Jonas Pfetzing; Eva Briegel	3:50
Total length:			42:20

== Charts ==
=== Weekly charts ===
Weekly chart performance for Es ist Juli
Chart (2004)	Peak position
Austrian Albums (Ö3 Austria)	4
German Albums (Offizielle Top 100)	2
Swiss Albums (Schweizer Hitparade)	7

=== Year-end charts ===
2004 year-end chart performance for Es ist Juli
Chart (2004)	Position
Austrian Albums (Ö3 Austria)	60
German Albums (Offizielle Top 100)	29

2005 year-end chart performance for Es ist Juli
Chart (2005)	Position
Austrian Albums (Ö3 Austria)	16
German Albums (Offizielle Top 100)	4
Swiss Albums (Schweizer Hitparade)	10

== Certifications and sales ==
Certifications for Es ist Juli
Region	Certification	Certified units/sales
Austria (IFPI Austria)	Platinum	30,000^{*}
Germany (BVMI)	3× Platinum	600,000^{^}
Switzerland (IFPI Switzerland)	Platinum	40,000^{^}
^{*} Sales figures based on certification alone.^{^} Shipments figures based on certification alone.
