= Zerrissen =

Single by Juli

from the album Ein neuer Tag
- Released: 2007
- Genre: Pop rock; pop
- Songwriter: Simon Triebel
- Producer: O.L.A.F. Opal

Juli singles chronology
"Wir beide" (2006)	"Zerrissen" (2007)	"Stolen" (2007)

"Zerrissen" (English: "Torn") is a song by German band Juli. It was written by Simon Triebel and produced by O.L.A.F. Opal for their second studio album Ein neuer Tag (2006).

== Charts ==
Chart (2007)	Peak position
Austria (Ö3 Austria Top 40)	22
Germany (GfK)	15
