= Stolen (Dashboard Confessional song) =

Single by Dashboard Confessional featuring Juli

from the album Dusk and Summer
- Released: February 13, 2007
- Genre: Alternative rock, emo
- Length: 3:19; 3:53 (album version)
- Label: Vagrant, Universal
- Songwriter: Chris Carrabba
- Producer: Don Gilmore

Dashboard Confessional singles chronology
"Rooftops and Invitations" (2006)	"Stolen" (2007)	"Thick as Thieves" (2007)

Juli singles chronology
"Zerrissen" (2007)	"Stolen" (2007)	"Ein neuer Tag" (2007)

"Stolen" is a song by Dashboard Confessional, released on February 13, 2007 as the third single from their fourth studio album Dusk and Summer (2006). The song debuted at number 65 on the Billboard Hot 100 in April 2007, and peaked at No. 44. It is the band's most successful single to date in the U.S., and re-energized sales of Dusk and Summer.

For the German market, "Stolen" was rerecorded and reworked as a duet with the German rock/pop band Juli. Therefore, new scenes were edited in the old video. The single reached number 15 in Germany. The single of the first version was download-only, not released on CD; a CD was only handed out as a promotional item.

== Music video ==
The music video of "Stolen" depicts the nature of love over a lifetime. The video opens with a little girl (played by Julia Putnam) who has been staying at the Hotel del Coronado at the shore over the summer and a little boy (played by Richard Hicks) who appears to live in the hotel year round; both children seem to be in early elementary school. The two are shown in a room right before the girl's family leaves the hotel to go back home, and the two children seem very upset they will soon part; the young girl shows the boy tarot cards depicting future events that will take place in the hotel, and the next scene shows the girl in a Citroen DS that is pulling away while the boy stands in the driveway of the hotel on the brink of tears.

The video shows the girl's family revisiting the hotel every few years. A later scene shows the two, now as teenagers, kissing in the same room as the earlier scene. The next scene skips ahead in time to when the girl, now a woman in her twenties (played by actress Olivia Wilde - of House M.D. and The O.C. fame), is attending a wedding at the hotel. The boy, now a man (played by Nick Steele), still seems to be living/working at the hotel, and the two lovers meet on the porch of the inn and are holding hands. They let go and separate as the woman's boyfriend walks up to her. The man storms away as he watches her boyfriend lead her away.

The next scene of this love sequence shows the woman on a cliff overlooking the beach and the man approaches, after words are spoken that cannot be heard because of the music in the song, the lovers begin kissing. The last scene depicts the band finishing out the song on the porch depicted in the video.

The last thing seen is the boy and the girl, sitting in the same room, looking at the tarot cards.

The video has been likened to the classic novel Great Expectations by Charles Dickens, since aspects of the relationship between the characters of Estella and Pip may be similar to those portrayed between the girl and boy.

For the new version of "Stolen" featuring Juli some parts were replaced by scenes of the featured band, so that in this version only the boy/girl-scene appears whereas they in older age are missing completely.

== Track listings ==
U.S. promo CD

1. "Stolen" (radio mix)
2. "Stolen" (album version)

German CD single

1. "Stolen" (international version feat. Juli)
2. "In a Big Country"

German extended CD single

1. "Stolen" (international version feat. Juli)
2. "Stolen"
3. "In a Big Country"
4. "Stolen" (international version feat. Juli - video)

== Versions ==
- Album version - standard version found on the first edition of the album Dusk and Summer
- Radio mix - faster version found in the music video/promo CD and the deluxe version of Dusk and Summer
- Acoustic - acoustic version with violins replacing the synthesizers found on the "Don't Wait" single
- Duet with Juli (international version) - re-recorded and re-worked duet between Dashboard Confessional and German band Juli

== Charts ==
Chart (2007)	Peak position
Germany (GfK)	15
US Billboard Hot 100	44
US Mainstream Top 40 (Billboard)	28
US Adult Top 40 (Billboard)	36

== Release history ==
Release dates and formats for "Stolen"
Region	Date	Format	Label(s)	Ref.
United States	February 13, 2007	Mainstream airplay	Vagrant	
