= Michael Klar =

German graphic artist (1943–2023)

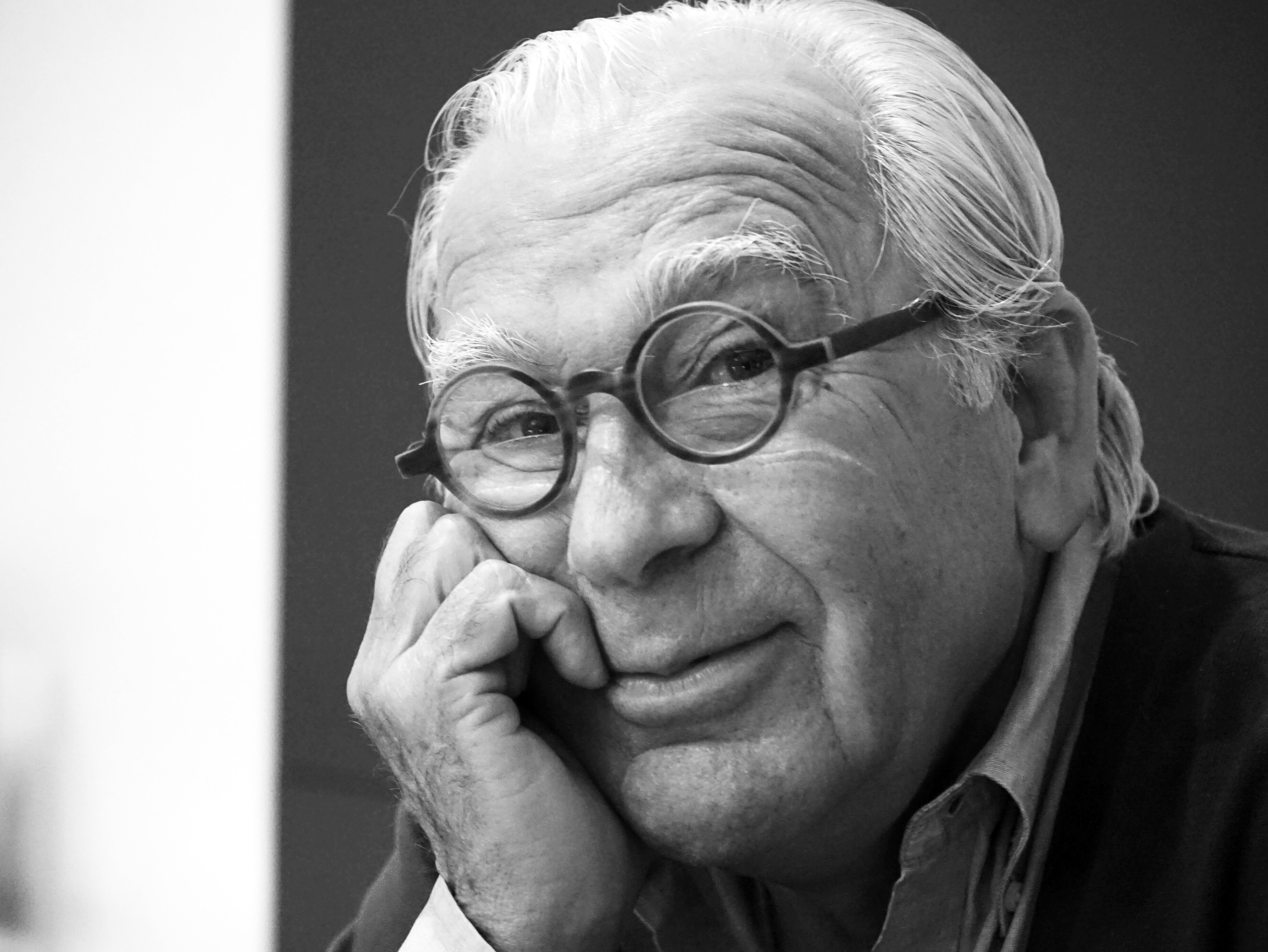
Klar in 2013

Michael Klar (1943 – 2 September 2023) was a German graphic artist, designer and professor for visual communication.

== Life and work ==
Michael Klar was born in Berlin in 1943. He qualified as a photographer at the Lette-Verein in Berlin. From 1963 to 1966 he studied at the Visual Communication Department of the renowned "Hochschule für Gestaltung Ulm", Germany. Among his tutors were Otl Aicher, Herbert W. Kapitzki and Tomás Maldonado.

Between 1966 and 1967 he worked as assistant in the Kapitzki/Ohl project group for the pavilion of the Federal Republic of Germany at the world exhibition EXPO 67 Montreal, Canada. He graduated in 1968 obtaining his diploma from the HfG (Hochschule für Gestaltung) Ulm. He acted as student spokesman during the year in which the school was forced to close.

From 1968 to 1970 he was involved in the development of a design lab, the "Holzäpfel Projekt Institut". In 1970 together with architect Bernd Meurer he initiated the "Project Co'", a design studio in Ulm.

In 1972 Klar was called as professor for Visual Communication to the "Hochschule für Gestaltung Schwäbisch Gmünd" where he was to influence the concepts and programme of the college. Furthermore, during the same period, he held several guest professorships in various design schools, among which the Ohio State University, USA, the Emily Carr University of Art and Design Vancouver, Canada and the Università Iuav di Venezia, Italy.

Between 1992 and 1994 Klar also served as founding dean of the "Faculty of Gestaltung" at the Hochschule für Technik und Wirtschaft in Dresden, Germany.

From 1992 till 2008 Klar taught at the "Hochschule der Künste Berlin", which was later named "Universität der Künste" and held the position of Professor for Visual Communication at the "Institut für Transmediale Gestaltung".

Michael Klar lived last in Berlin where he worked as a designer. He died there on 2 September 2023, at the age of 80.

== Publications ==
- Ulmer Statistik, Ulm 14/15/16 1965
- Zeichensysteme, Dynamische Fernsehanzeige, Ulm 17/18 1966
- aus der hfg: ein Beitrag zur Expo ‘67 in Montreal, Ulmer Forum Heft 2/1967
- Kritik an der Rolle des Design in der Verschwendungsgesellschaft, Format 20, Nr. 2/1969
- Studieneinführung Design, Aspekte, Nr. 3/1973
- Kommunikation und Praxis, Kritik der Alltagskultur, Ästhetik + Kommunikation 1979
- Ausbildung ist Praxis, Format 80, Nr. 4/1979
- HfG Synopse, Hrsg. N. H. Roericht, Ulm 1982
- Geschichte der Produktivkräfte, Michael Klar u. a. VSA Verlag 1982
- Erscheinungsbild für einen Büromöbelhersteller, Novum, Nr. 5/1984
- Michael Klar, Rasegna, Anno VI, 19/3 Settembre 1984
- Michael Klar, The European Iceberg, Creativity in Germany and Italy Today, Art Gallery of Ontario, Mazzotta 1985
- Ulm … die Moral der Gegenstände, Ernst und Sohn 1987
- Geschichte der Produktivkräfte, zgraf 1987
- Der Gestalter als Autor, Werk+Zeit, Nr. 3/4 1983
- Wir fliegen alle durchs Ozonloch, Design Report, Nr. 9/1989
- Designed in Germany, Hrsg. M. Erlhoff, Prestel 1990
- Fachhochschule für Gestaltung Schwäbisch Gmünd, Novum, Nr. 9/1991
- Diskussion zwischen zwei großen deutschen Typographen Klar – Kroeplien, Druckspiegel, Nr. 6/1991
- Objekt+Objektiv=Objektivität? Fotografie an der HfG, HfG Archiv Ulm, 1991
- International Exhibition of Graphic Design + Communication, Zagreb, zgraf, Nr. 6/1991
- Globoscope, Form + Zweck, Nr.4+5/1992
- Globale Information – ein Projekt, Zukunft des Raums, campus 1994,
- Integriertes Verkehrskonzept, Olympia Express 2000, IDZ Berlin 1994
- Sprechende Bauten, design report 9/1995
- Globale Information – ein Projekt, Positionen zur Gestaltung, Bremen 1995
- Freunde und Begegnungen, Süddeutsche Verlagsgesellschaft 1997
- Das Ganze ist mehr als die Summe seiner Teile, Kompendium Corporate Identity und Corporate Design, av edition, 1997
- Gestaltung im Projekt der Moderne, av edition, 1997
- Design ist verkommen, design is a journey, Springer Verlag 1997
- Kouakourou – Tokio, Designtheorie, anabas 2001
- Institut für Transmediale Gestaltung, Hochschule der Künste Berlin, 2001
- tomás, seniorservice books, Milano 2002
- Konkrete Utopie HfG, design report 10/2003
- Berlin Nachtausgabe, Berlin Night Edition, Hrsg. Michael Klar, nicolai 2007
- PingPongProjekt, Ein Projekt der Grafikdesign-Ausbildung… Hrsg. Severin Wucher, Gao Yi, Jiangxi Fine Arts Publishing House, 2008
- IUAV DESIGN WORKSHOP 09, IN MOVIMENTO, 2009
- Kommando Otl Aicher, Rede zum UdK Preis 2012, Universität der Künste 2014
- Kritik an der Rolle des Design in der Verschwendungsgesellschaft, Design, Texte zur Geschichte und Theorie, Reclam, Universal-Bibliothek, Stuttgart 2018
