= Rock Band (video game) =

2007 music video game

- Developer: Harmonix (Note: PlayStation 2 and Wii's version developed by Pi Studios)
- Publisher: MTV Games
- Director: Josh Randall
- Producer: Michael Verrette
- Designers: Greg LoPiccolo; Rob Kay; Dan Teasdale
- Programmers: Eran Egozy; James Flemming
- Artist: Ryan Lesser
- Writer: Helen McWilliams
- Series: Rock Band
- Platforms: Xbox 360; PlayStation 3 PlayStation 2 Wii
- Release: Xbox 360: NA: November 20, 2007; EU: May 23, 2008; AU: November 7, 2008; PlayStation 3: NA: November 20, 2007; EU: September 12, 2008; AU: November 7, 2008; PlayStation 2: NA: December 17, 2007; EU: September 12, 2008; AU: November 7, 2008; Wii: NA: June 22, 2008; EU: September 12, 2008; AU: November 7, 2008
- Genre: Rhythm
- Modes: Single-player, multiplayer

Rock Band is a 2007 rhythm game developed by Harmonix, published by MTV Games, and distributed by Electronic Arts. It is the first installment in the Rock Band series. The Xbox 360 and PlayStation 3 versions were released in North America on November 20, 2007, while the PlayStation 2 version was released on December 18, 2007 and the Wii version on June 22, 2008. Harmonix previously developed the first two games in the Guitar Hero series, which popularized gameplay of rock music with guitar-shaped controllers. After development of the series was shifted to Neversoft, Harmonix conceived Rock Band as a new title that would offer multi-instrument gameplay.

The game allows up to four players to simulate the performance of popular rock songs by playing with controllers modeled after musical instruments. Players can play the lead guitar, bass guitar, and drums parts to songs with "instrument controllers", as well as sing through a USB microphone. Players are scored on their ability to match scrolling musical "notes" while playing instruments, or by their ability to match the singer's pitch on vocals. Players with the Xbox 360 and PlayStation 3 versions can interact with players on the same platform through both online and offline multiplayer capabilities. In addition to the 58 core songs included on the game disc, over 2,000 downloadable songs were released for the Xbox 360 and PlayStation 3 versions.

At launch, the game software was made available in a bundle that packaged it together with the instrument peripherals, as well as for purchase separately. Individual instrument peripherals were released at a later date. The game received widespread critical acclaim, with sales of four million units and global revenues of $600 million. Players have made over 100 million downloadable song purchases since Rock Band's release. The game's success prompted the release of six sequels: Rock Band 2, The Beatles: Rock Band, Lego Rock Band, Green Day: Rock Band, Rock Band 3 and Rock Band 4.

== Gameplay ==
Gameplay of a full band playing Metallica's "Enter Sandman". Each instrument is represented by a different interface: bass guitar (right), drums (middle), lead guitar (left), vocals (top). The Band Meter (green meter on left) measures the performance of each band member, while the Energy Meter (gold meter beneath each interface) tracks each player's Overdrive.

Reusing many gameplay elements from the Guitar Hero series, Rock Band players use peripherals modeled after musical instruments to simulate the performance of rock music. Players use these instruments by playing scrolling musical "notes" on-screen in time with the music. Rock Band expands upon the Guitar Hero series, in that it offers gameplay for drums and vocals, in addition to lead and bass guitar.

Rock Band's gameplay and on-screen interface uses a combination of elements from Guitar Hero and Karaoke Revolution. Rock Band has up to three tracks of vertically scrolling colored music notes, one section each for lead guitar, drums, and bass. The colored notes on-screen correspond to buttons on the guitar and drum peripherals. For lead and bass guitar, players play their notes by holding down colored fret buttons on the guitar peripheral and pushing the controller's strum bar; for drums, players must strike the matching colored drumhead, or step on the pedal to simulate playing bass drum notes. Along the top of the screen is the vocals display, which scrolls horizontally, similar to Karaoke Revolution. The lyrics display beneath green bars, which represent the pitch of the individual vocal elements. When singing vocals, the player must sing in relative pitch to the original vocals. A pitch indicator displays the singer's accuracy relative to the original pitch. The remainder of the screen is used to display the band's virtual characters as they perform in concert.

During cooperative play as a band, all players earn points towards a common score, though score multipliers and "Overdrive" are tracked separately for each player. Overdrive is collected during select portions of a song by successfully playing all white notes within that section (or by using the guitar controller's whammy bar during white sustained notes). Once the Energy Meter is filled halfway, players can deploy their Overdrive, resulting in the "Band Meter" (which tracks how well each player is doing) changing more dramatically. This allows players to strategically use Overdrive to raise the Band Meter and pass portions of a song they otherwise might have failed. Overdrive can be used to activate score multipliers, which vary based on a player's note streak. Players can deploy Overdrive independently of each other, as well as collect additional Overdrive while it is deployed and draining.

Each band member can choose the difficulty at which they play (spanning Easy, Medium, Hard, and Expert). If a player does not play well enough and falls to the bottom of the Band Meter, they will fail out of the song and their instrument will be muted from the audio mix. However, any active player can activate their Overdrive to bring failed players back into the song, "saving" the band member. However, a band member can only be saved twice; after the third failure, they cannot be brought back for that song. Failed players continuously drag the band's Band Meter down until they are saved. If the player is not saved before the Band Meter reaches the bottom, the band fails the song. Players can earn Overdrive bonuses from "Unison Phrases" and extra points from a "Big Rock Ending."

Unlike the PlayStation 2 and Wii version, players with the Xbox 360 or PlayStation 3 versions can create and customize their own in-game character, complete with adjustable hair, body physique, clothing, tattoos, onstage movements, and instruments. Each character is permanently locked into a specific instrument. Using cash earned within the game, the player may purchase items at the in-game "Rock Shop," with which they can customize their rock star. The game features an art maker where players can combine different clip art elements to create custom face paint, tattoos, clothing designs, instrument artwork, and band logos.

=== Instrument peripherals ===
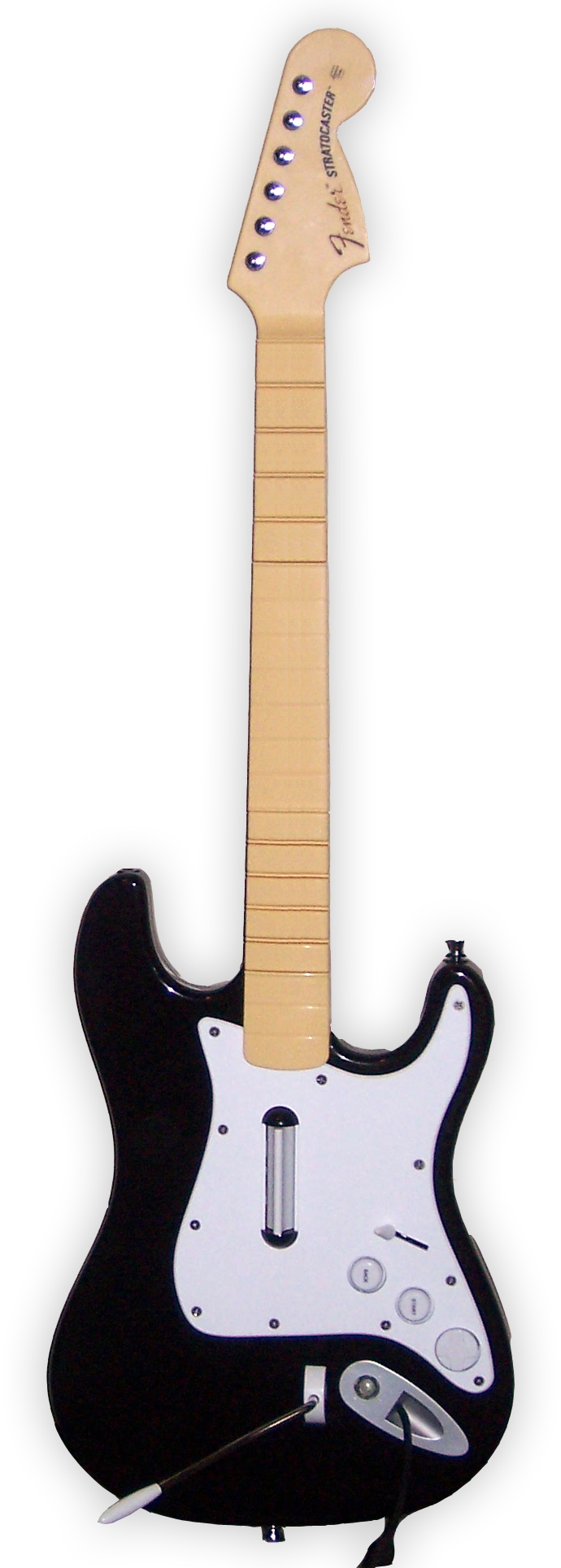
The Fender Stratocaster Controller, which features 10 frets, a whammy bar, and an effects switch

The game features special Rock Band-branded guitar controllers modeled after the Fender Stratocaster to be used for the lead and bass guitar gameplay. These are similar to the Guitar Hero controllers, as they feature five colored fret buttons on the neck, a strum bar, and a whammy bar. The Stratocaster controller has five additional fret buttons of smaller size located closer to the guitar's main body. These buttons can be used to play notes in guitar solos (denoted by the note track turning blue) as hammer-ons and pull-offs, without the need to strum. Additionally, the controller features an effects pickup switch that can toggle between five different effects, which are applied in solos and when Overdrive is activated. Overdrive for guitarists can be deployed by holding the controller in a vertical position or pressing the "Select/Back" button. The controller is offered in both wired and wireless versions. Harmonix confirmed most Guitar Hero guitar controllers and additional third-party controllers are compatible with the game. The Stratocaster controller is not compatible with Guitar Hero II or III.

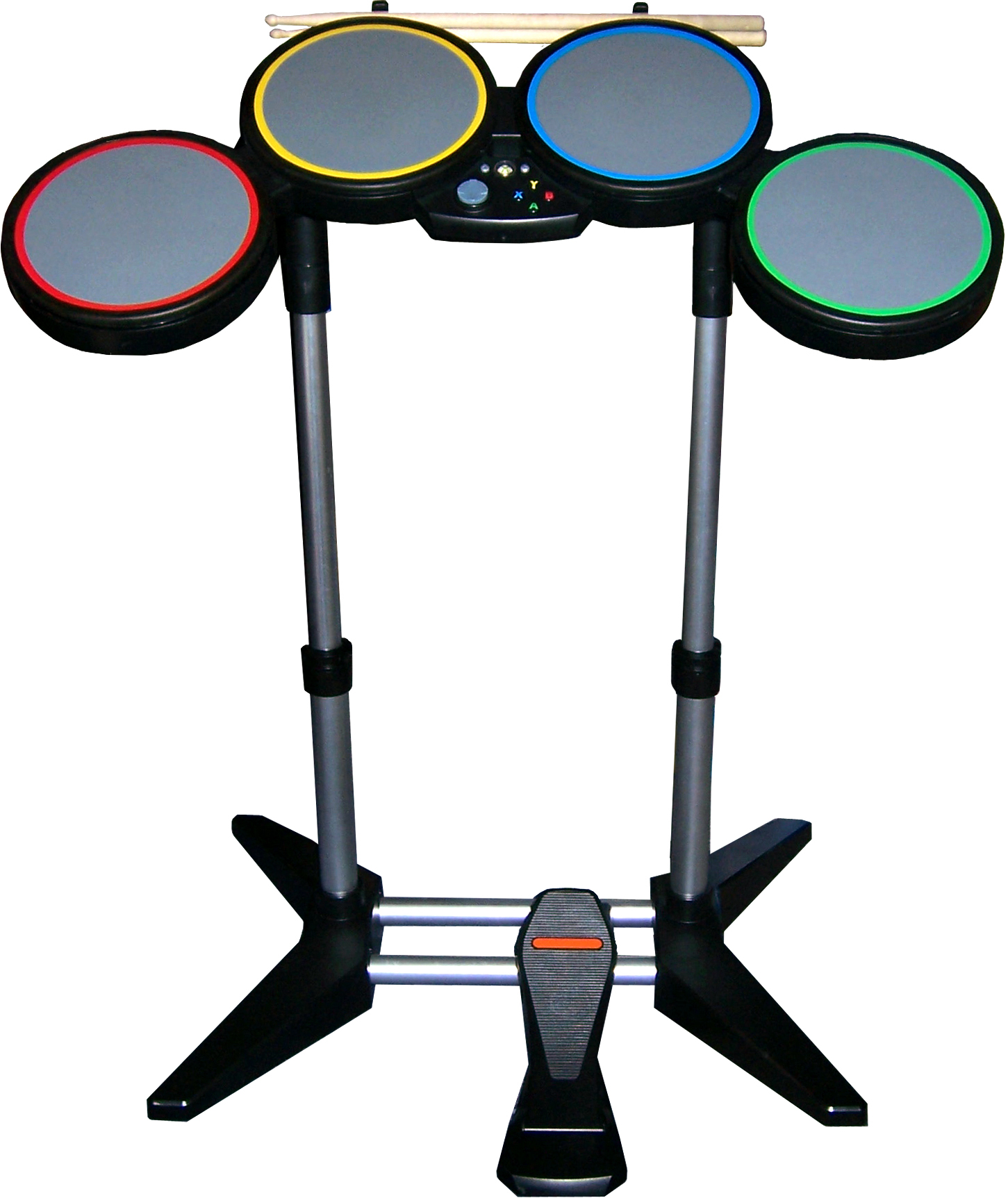
The drum controller, which features 4 pads, a bass drum pedal, and real drumsticks (this may be a rockband 2 kit)

The drum controller features four rubber drum pads and a kick pedal. The pads have colored rings around the edges that correspond to the notes on-screen, representing the snare drum (red), hi-hat (yellow), tom-tom (blue), and crash cymbal (green). The kick pedal simulates the bass drum, with on-screen notes represented as orange horizontal lines. A pair of authentic drum sticks are included with the controller. Drummers can improvise in special "freestyle drum fill" sections of songs, indicated by the columns for each note turning a solid color. Overdrive for drummers can be deployed by hitting the crash cymbal (green note for right-handed configuration) that appears directly after a freestyle drum fill. Harmonix representatives have suggested, "If you can play the drum parts on hard, you can pretty much play the drums [in reality]."

Rock Band's USB microphone instrument is similar to the model used in the Harmonix-developed Karaoke Revolution games. For the most part, singers are judged on how closely they match the relative pitch of the song's vocalist. During "talking parts" that do not judge pitch, a phoneme detector will pick up individual vowels and consonants of the spoken lyrics. Some sections without vocals will display circle notes, allowing for the microphone to be used as a tambourine and cowbell by tapping it or making vocal cues. Overdrive for singers can be deployed by singing in freestyle vocal sections of songs, denoted by yellow artwork in the background of the vocals interface. While the "Big Rock Ending" section is unavailable to that instrument, "Overdrive" can mandatory be activated during that section while playing as a band member.

=== Band World Tour mode ===
The world map in Band World Tour, which allows the band to select a city, venue, and setlist

"Band World Tour" is the game's primary multiplayer mode. It allows any combination of 2-4 local players to create a virtual band, play gigs, and tour a virtual representation of the world. Although online play is not supported for Band World Tour, players can use the "Band Quickplay" mode to play together as a band online. For the Xbox 360 and PlayStation 3 versions of the game, Band World Tour mode lets bands play in 41 different venues spanning 17 cities, including Los Angeles, Seattle, Boston, New York, London, Sydney, Stockholm, and Rome. After creating their band, characters, and logo, the players can begin playing concerts in small venues in their hometown until they unlock vans, tour buses and private jets, which unlock other cities and continents. Successful performances also earn the band fans, stars, and in-game cash. Most cities and larger venues require the band to achieve a certain number of fans and stars before they are unlocked. In-game venues are inspired by real-life venues and often display local art styles from each of the represented cities.

For the Xbox 360 and PlayStation 3 versions, rather than complete predetermined lists of songs (like in previous Guitar Hero games), players complete unique sets of activities at each venue. Performances consist of single songs, multiple song sets, "make your own" setlists, and mystery setlists. Players are also faced with decisions that Harmonix refers to as "risk-versus-reward." For certain performances, bands are faced with an optional challenge that requires the band to average a certain number of stars for their gig in order to reap the rewards. Bands can also choose to perform a benefit concert (earning no in-game money but gaining more fans) or "sell-out" (earning more in-game money but losing fans). Additionally, for certain gigs, bands can compete for band personnel, as well as a recording deal with a record label. The "Endless Setlist" provides players with all-day concert experience, as the setlist requires playing the entire game disc's setlist from start to finish.

The PlayStation 2 and Wii versions of Rock Band contain a more stripped-down version of the Band World Tour mode, as 2–4 local players will only be able to play by completing predetermined tiers of songs ordered by difficulty. Players cannot create their own characters, nor can they choose a city, venue, or a setlist to play.

=== Solo Tour modes ===
"Solo Tour" is a single-player mode offered for the lead guitar, drum, and microphone peripherals (there is no support for bass). Rather than feature the open-ended gameplay and features of the next-generation versions of Band World Tour mode, Solo Tour is structured much in the same vein as the career mode in Guitar Hero games. Players choose/create their character (on the Xbox 360 and PlayStation 3 versions only) and complete predetermined sets of songs ordered by difficulty, with each instrument's setlist ordered differently. By completing these sets of songs, additional songs are unlocked for play across all game modes. For the PlayStation 3 and Xbox 360 versions, players can use money earned for each performance to purchase merchandise at the "Rock Shop". The character's cash carries over into Band World Tour mode, and vice versa.

=== Other modes ===
Players can quickly play any song on any instrument individually in "Solo Quickplay". For a competitive experience, players can individually compete against each other for each instrument type in the "Tug of War" (much like Guitar Hero's "Face-off", in which players trade playing sections of a song to move a meter in their favor) and "Score Duel" (much like Guitar Hero II's "Pro Face-off", in which each player plays the song in its entirety on the same difficulty level to earn points). These head-to-head modes are available both online (for the Xbox 360 and PlayStation 3 versions) and locally. "Band Quickplay" mode allows bands to quickly play any song; the Xbox 360 and PlayStation 3 versions allow any combination of 2–4 local or online players to play as a band, while the PlayStation 2 and Wii versions only supports 2–4 local players. Also included in Rock Band are "Tutorial Mode", which allows players to learn how to play each instrument, and "Practice Mode", which allows players to practice songs for each instrument.

== Soundtrack ==
All versions of Rock Band feature the same core 58 playable tracks on the game disc; 45 of these are featured tracks in the main setlist, while the other 13 tracks are "bonus songs" by independent or lesser-known bands, as well as bands made up of Harmonix employees. In total, 51 of the 58 songs are master recordings. The Wii version of the game features 5 additional songs. Featured tracks include "Dani California" by Red Hot Chili Peppers, "(Don't Fear) The Reaper" by Blue Öyster Cult, "Enter Sandman" by Metallica, "Here It Goes Again" by OK Go, "Highway Star" by Deep Purple, "Learn to Fly" by Foo Fighters, "Suffragette City" by David Bowie, "Wanted Dead or Alive" by Bon Jovi, and "Won't Get Fooled Again" by The Who. All but three songs on the Rock Band disc can be transferred to the user's hard drive on the Xbox 360 or PlayStation 3 to be used for Rock Band 2. Furthermore, an extra two songs from Rock Band cannot be carried over into Rock Band 3.

Harmonix co-founder Alex Rigopulos commented that the game's soundtrack would be "covering a great breadth, from metal to classic rock to Southern rock to everything in between." Five record labels agreed to supply most of the master recordings by their artists for use in the game, including EMI Music, Hollywood Records, Sony BMG Music Entertainment, Universal Music Group's Universal Music Enterprises, and Warner Music Group's Rhino Entertainment.

=== Downloadable songs and Track Packs ===
The PlayStation 3 and Xbox 360 versions of the game support downloadable songs. Users can download songs on a track-by-track basis, with many of the tracks digitally bundled together in "song packs" or complete albums at a discounted rate. Harmonix likened the Rock Band game to a new platform for future music releases, and the company built the library of downloadable content up to hundreds of songs within the first year of the game's release by releasing new content on a weekly basis. Fifteen songs were made available at the game's launch date. To date, over 1,480 downloadable songs are available and over 100 million song purchases have been made by players. Downloadable songs are playable within every game mode, including the Band World Tour career mode. All downloadable songs released before Rock Band 3 came out are cross-compatible between Rock Band and Rock Band 2. Downloadable albums have been a major selling point for the game, with nine albums having been released to date. Currently, most song packs containing three songs are priced at $5.49/440 Microsoft Points, while most individual songs are available for the standard price of $1.99/160 MSP. Occasionally, certain songs are initially priced at $0.99/80 MSP for a limited time. The prices for albums differ, depending on the number of songs the album contains.

As both the PlayStation 2 and Wii version lack downloadable content, Harmonix released a series of "Track Pack" standalone games that are sold in retail stores. Each volume contains several of the tracks available as downloadable content for Xbox 360 and PlayStation 3. Track Pack Vol. 2 saw an expanded release on the Xbox 360 and PlayStation 3, as well. One Track Pack, exclusively featuring the songs of AC/DC's 1991 Live at Donington concert, was released in November 2008.

== Development ==
Harmonix Music Systems was previously responsible for making the Guitar Hero series, while RedOctane manufactured the peripherals and owned the rights to the series. However, in June 2006, RedOctane was bought by Activision, while in September 2006, Harmonix was purchased by MTV Networks. As a result of the two purchases, Harmonix was no longer able to develop future Guitar Hero games. Instead, Neversoft, a subsidiary of Activision, took over development; the company released Guitar Hero III: Legends of Rock on October 28, 2007. According to "The Business", Rock Band cost $200 million to develop. Harmonix's Vice President of Product Development, Greg LoPiccolo, stated that the game took about 20 months to develop, already having envisioned the possibility of different instruments before they were completed with the Guitar Hero series.

Development started around February 2006, working with industrial designers J. Hayes and contract manufacturer Canyon Creations for prototyping instruments. One of the first needs for developing Rock Band was new hardware, specifically for the drums, since they already had experience with guitar controllers from Guitar Hero. Working in tandem between software and hardware development, Harmonix spent time working on a drum controller prototype and how its track would be shown on screen. One difficulty faced was the drum bass pedal's visual representation; the four drum pads were generally matched in visual space as to the onscreen note track, but using a standard note "gem" for bass pedals threw testers off. They eventually came to the solution of using a horizontal bar that spanned the note track to represent the bass pedal. Once the drum prototypes were done, they started working on the guitar controllers. Preliminary hardware pieces were completed by April 2007, leading to mass production in China for release. Harmonix noted that they had not started their discussions with their Chinese manufacturers early enough, as they needed to push a team to be in China during the principle production months from June to September 2007 to make sure initial production was completed and in transit to meet the release date.

Gameplay was designed to focus on the feeling of being in a band. Initial playtests showed that there was a lack of cohesion if each member of the band just played their parts. Harmonix created its Harmonix Design Cabal from senior designers and veterans of the studio to play around with the gameplay and UI to help identify means that would encourage a more unified band. This team led to the introduction of features such as saving failing teammates, unison bonuses, bass grooves, guitar and drum solos, and Big Rock Endings that were present in the final game. For networking, they opted to use the Quazal networking scheme rather than the platforms' network offerings, which allowed them flexibility in Rock Band and future games. Large-scale testing and debugging for their network and server capabilities was done by renting time on a supercomputer to simulate 100,000 simultaneous connections. Harmonix wanted "authenticity" in the game's visual style, driving the design of the in-game characters' costumes – which were inspired by several music genres – the selection of the in-game instruments, and the character animations to help emulate a music video.

In selecting the soundtrack for Rock Band, the developers acknowledged that they needed songs that were recognizable, particularly on vocals; in contrast, for Guitar Hero, they selected songs that played better, even if they were less recognizable. They also considered songs that would help players come together socially, such as in The Who's "Won't Get Fooled Again", in which they retained the long synthesizer solo so that the re-entering of the band members at the end would produce a big moment for players. The team also picked songs by lesser-known artists from across different genres that they felt were good additions, such as "Maps" by the Yeah Yeah Yeahs and "Electric Version" by the New Pornographers, to introduce players to that music. For about half the songs, they hired a studio to sing along to the lyrics like a crowd would at a stadium, such that when players are performing well in the game, the additional crowd sing-alongs would add to the performance experience.

Harmonix's parent company MTV provided financial support to the development process, taking advantage of its stature to facilitate deals with record companies for licensing rights to songs. Several record companies pledged their support by offering master recordings. Pressed for office space, Harmonix was forced to move its offices in the middle of Rock Band's beta period in order to support the company's 130-person staff. However, they continued to bring on more developers in order to complete the title on time. This led to several problems in bringing the newer coders on board without any technical plan, requiring the team to redesign several parts of the game, such as online matchmaking, several times to correct. Although the Xbox 360 and PlayStation 3 versions of the game were developed in-house, Harmonix outsourced development of the PlayStation 2 version to Pi Studios, as it omits certain features.

Harmonix faced difficulty in making the Xbox 360 guitar wireless, as developers are charged a licensing fee to use Microsoft's wireless technology. Had Harmonix chosen to pay the fee, the Xbox 360 and PlayStation 3 bundles of Rock Band would have sold at different price points. Instead, Harmonix chose a wired technology for the Xbox 360 bundle's guitar. In the certification process for both Xbox and PlayStation platforms, Harmonix encountered difficulty in how to assign service profiles to different instruments; while they ended with a profile management systems that met the certification requirements, the solution was considered functional but awkward to use.

Around 160 developers were involved on Rock Band, though Harmonix noted they likely needed to hire more. They found the various department leads overwhelmed with tasks, despite being those that also offered the most creative input on the game's design. Harmonix also found during development that they jumped head-first into some technical approaches that initially seemed to work but failed on larger-scale tests; the online functionality went through several such iterations.

Rock Band was first announced on April 1, 2007. Harmonix CEO Alex Rigopulos said in the announcement that Rock Band "takes the core premise of Guitar Hero and expands it tenfold. It lets you create a complete collaborative band." Rock Band was a featured game at the 2007 E3 convention and provided one of the exhibition's highlights; Harmonix employees and Microsoft executive Peter Moore played the game on-stage, performing The Hives' "Main Offender". Moore paused the game twice when he accidentally hit the guitar's Xbox Guide button.

A software update was released on March 21, 2008, which added new features to the game. The update included an in-game music store with preview and sorting options, revised microphone performance, and faster downloadable content loading.

=== Online community ===
On October 25, 2007, Harmonix and MTV announced RockBand.com would be transformed into an extensive community website at the game's launch, and that it would extend the features of the game. The community website was absent at the game's launch in order to fix bugs and complete features, but was launched on December 19, 2007. The site offered leaderboards, customizable band profile pages with stats, a classified area for bands to find additional members, band blogs, online forums, and other sharing features. Many originally announced features, such as the ability for players to pose their avatars, take photo shoots and order T-shirts, bumper stickers, and figurines, were eventually made available on the website for Rock Band 2.

== Release ==
=== Promotion ===
MTV and Harmonix promoted Rock Band heavily in the months leading up to the game's release. The game made a nationwide promotional tour of the United States. Several tour buses made stops at major American cities to set up demo stations and showcase playable versions of the game for fans. Many of the locations included college campuses. Additionally, fan-created "bands" were able to audition on-stage by playing the game; their performances were recorded and sent to MTV casting directors, who selected two bands to appear on Total Request Live in a "battle of the bands." The promotional tour commenced with a featured showcase at the MTV Video Music Awards in Las Vegas on September 9, 2007.

MTV invested in additional promotions that totaled about $30 million. The game was set up within the homes of The Real World participants, allowing for on-air visibility. VH1 also produced a brief spoof documentary in the style of Behind the Music titled "Rock Band Cometh: The Rock Band Band Story," documenting a fictional band that plays the game.

The game appeared in demo kiosks at Best Buy, Wal-Mart, and Sam's Club stores. The demo contained 15 songs and supports gameplay for all 4 instruments (although the actual in-store setup varied). The demo's drum set lacked a bass pedal, with the game automatically playing bass drum notes.

Other companies helped to promote Rock Band through free and reduced cost downloadable content. Best Buy offered two free downloadable tracks by the band Disturbed for customers that pre-ordered their Indestructible album online; these tracks were made available to all users in June 2008 for $0.99/80MSP. McDonald's sponsored a month-long program that reduced the cost of two selected downloadable tracks to $1 (approximately half the standard cost) for each week during the month of May 2008 as part of their Dollar Menu promotion.

The United Kingdom release of the game took place in London, where a number of bands including The Automatic, The Whip, and The Courteeners performed short sets.

=== Editions ===
Special Edition bundles
Features	Xbox 360	PlayStation 3	PlayStation 2	Wii
Release date (US)	November 20, 2007	November 20, 2007	December 18, 2007	June 22, 2008
Release date (EU)	May 23, 2008	September 22, 2008	September 22, 2008	September 22, 2008
Release date (AUS)	November 7, 2008	November 7, 2008	November 7, 2008	November 7, 2008
Guitar controller type	Wired and Wireless	Wireless	Wireless	Wireless

The "Special Edition" bundle includes the game software, as well as guitar, drum, and microphone peripherals. The PlayStation 2, PlayStation 3, and Wii bundles include a wireless guitar, whereas the Xbox 360 bundle contains a wired guitar (a separate wireless guitar is currently available for the Xbox 360). Initially, a USB hub was only included in the Xbox 360, Wii, and PlayStation 2 bundles, in order to increase the number of available USB ports on the console. The more recent PlayStation 3 bundles now include a USB hub, with a sticker on the box indicating so. MTV originally announced Rock Band would be released for the Xbox 360 and PlayStation 3 on November 23, 2007, Black Friday, one of the busiest shopping days in the United States. However, the release date was eventually moved to November 20, 2007.

The game software was made available for purchase individually at the game's launch, allowing players with a USB microphone or a compatible guitar controller to take advantage of the vocals, lead guitar, and bass guitar gameplay. Individual Rock Band-branded instruments became available in retail stores later, starting with the drum kit on February 12, 2008. An individual wireless guitar became available on April 8, 2008.

On April 8, 2008, EA announced a timed Xbox 360 exclusive for a partial European launch, with other versions to follow later in the summer.

=== Technical issues and guitar incompatibility ===
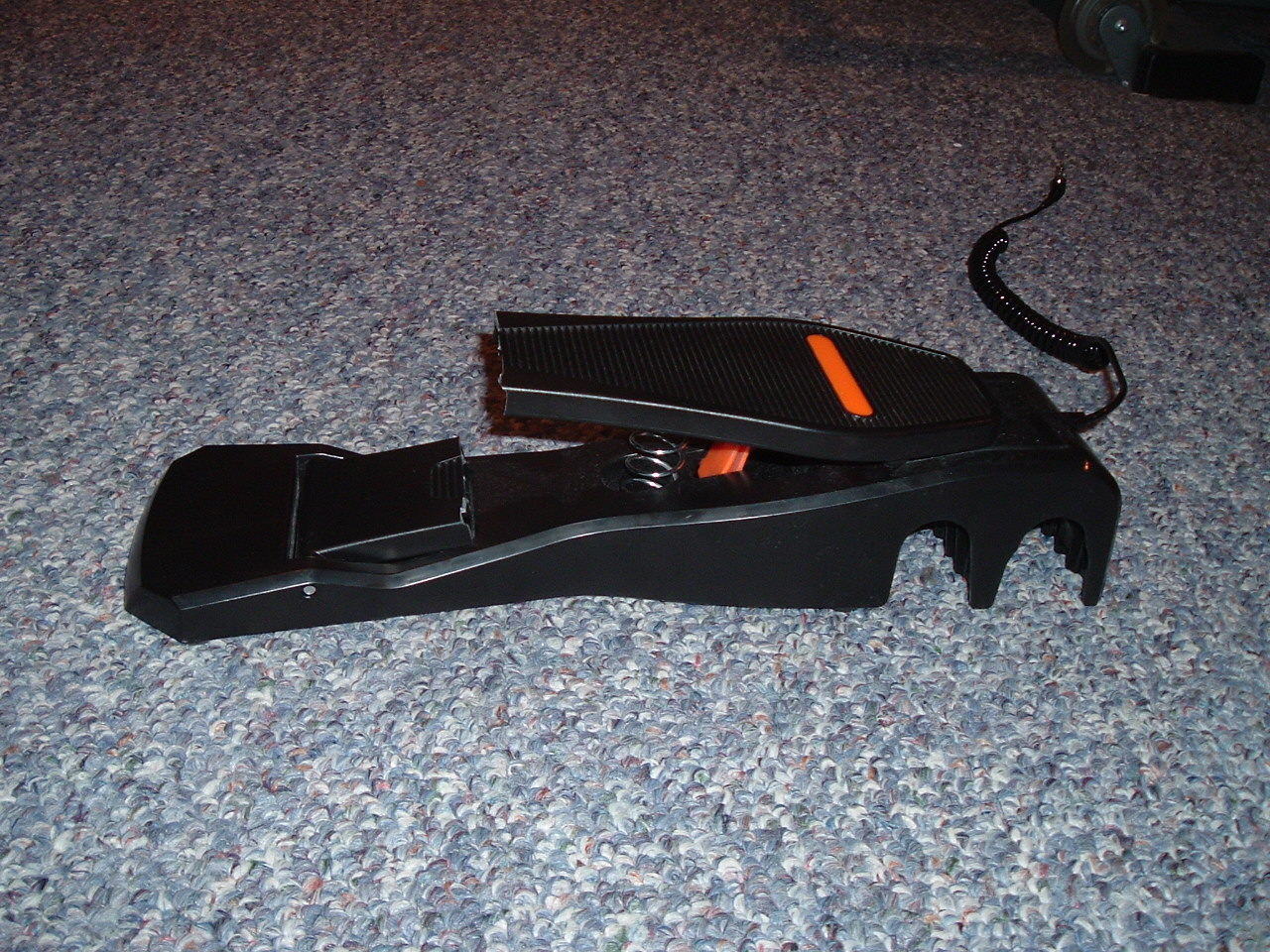
A snapped bass drum pedal. This is one common malfunction occurring in Rock Band peripherals.

Upon release, many players reported hardware issues with Rock Band peripherals. Many complaints stemmed from the bass drum pedal snapping in two, the Stratocaster controller's strum bar being unresponsive, and it occasionally lagging when tilted to activate Overdrive. In response to these issues, Harmonix admitted the guitars bundled with initial shipment of the game bundles were subject to manufacturing issues and stated that they would replace all faulty peripherals. Players affected by faulty peripherals were able to take advantage of the 60-day warranty on the peripherals and obtain replacements from EA. However, a class action lawsuit was issued against Harmonix, MTV Games, Viacom, and Electronic Arts over the failures of the bass drum pedal, claiming the companies conspired to force consumers to pay for repairs or upgrade to the Rock Band 2 drum kit. Attempts were made to settle the lawsuit in 2008, but were unsuccessful. In September 2009, the original plaintiff dropped the lawsuit.

Other players discovered at the game's launch that the Gibson Les Paul guitar controller bundled with the PlayStation 3 version of Guitar Hero III: Legends of Rock was initially not compatible with the PlayStation 3 version of Rock Band, despite Harmonix stating that any controllers that followed the open-controller standard would work. While this incompatibility could have been resolved through technical solutions, both Harmonix and Activision cited the other party as being at fault for failing to correct the incompatibility. Harmonix developed a patch to fix the issue, but it was blocked by Activision. Activision stated that MTV Games was unwilling to reach an agreement to pay Activision to use the Guitar Hero III technology in Rock Band. This incompatibility also applies to the Wii's Les Paul peripheral. However, a patch for the PlayStation 3 version of Rock Band was eventually released on September 11, 2008, allowing the Guitar Hero III Les Paul controller to work with Rock Band. Nyko released a PlayStation 3 version of their "Frontman" guitar controller that is compatible with both Guitar Hero III and Rock Band.

At a press conference at the 2008 E3 convention, Activision confirmed that the Xbox 360 version of Guitar Hero World Tour will be able to use Rock Band's instruments, adapting the note tracks to account for the smaller number of drum pads, and that this compatibility was patched into Guitar Hero: Aerosmith as a result of additional arrangements.

== Reception ==
Reception

Review scores
Publication	Score			
Publication	PS2	PS3	Wii	Xbox 360
1Up.com	B+	N/A	B−	A
Electronic Gaming Monthly	N/A	N/A	N/A	27.5/30
Game Informer	N/A	N/A	8.25/10	9.25/10
GamePro	N/A	N/A	N/A	19.5/20
GameSpot	8/10	N/A	N/A	9/10
GameTrailers	N/A	9.3/10	N/A	9.3/10
IGN	8.4/10	N/A	7.9/10	9.4/10
Official Xbox Magazine (US)	N/A	N/A	N/A	9.5/10
PlayStation: The Official Magazine	N/A	5/5	N/A	N/A
X-Play	N/A	N/A	4/5	N/A
Wired	N/A	10/10	N/A	10/10

Prior to release, EA CEO John Riccitielo remarked that the company would not be able to meet the high demand for Rock Band in the 2007 holiday season, stating, "We're not going to be able to put enough inventory to meet demand in North America or Europe this calendar year or this fiscal [year]." This prompted many retailers to limit the number of preorders they sold before the game was released.

Official Xbox Magazine published the first review of Rock Band, scoring the Xbox 360 version a 9.5/10 and calling it "gaming's most intensely rewarding co-op experience." OXM also commented that the game's "payoff isn't visceral or technical; it's emotional." IGN awarded the game a 9.4/10 score and an Editor's Choice Award for the Xbox 360 and PlayStation 3 versions. IGN largely praised the game, calling it "one of the must-have games of the year" and suggesting it "may just be among the best party games ever released." 1UP.com gave the next-generation versions of the game an A, stating that "Rock Band unquestionably, unequivocally rocks." GameSpot rated the next-generation versions of the game a 9.0/10, calling Rock Band "one of the best party games of all time." They also gave the game their Editor's Choice award. The Xbox 360 version of Rock Band has an average critic score of 92%, according to Metacritic, tying it for the 24th-highest-scored Xbox 360 game. Similarly, the PlayStation 3 version of Rock Band has an average critic score of 92% on Metacritic, making it the 25th-highest-scored PlayStation 3 game.

Most critics commended the Xbox 360 and PlayStation 3 versions of Rock Band for the game's group gameplay, the depth of Band World Tour mode, and the introduction of a drum peripheral. Common complaints about the game focused on the different feel of the packaged Fender Stratocaster controller, as well as the game's Solo Tour modes not being as enjoyable as the multiplayer offerings. IGN's video review lamented the lack of a single player Band World Tour mode.

The PlayStation 2 version of the game was well received, but was subject to criticism for the omission of the character customization features, as well as the stripped-down Band World Tour mode. GameSpot rated it an 8.0/10, stating that "Rock Band is still a lot of fun on the PS2—it's just nowhere near the ideal version of the experience." IGN rated it an 8.4/10, noting that the removed features made the game feel like a "lessened" version, but that the game still "succeeds because it's infinitely fun to play with your friends."

Reviews for the Wii version of Rock Band also criticize the lack of features compared to the PlayStation 3 and Xbox 360 versions. The Wii version is basically the same as its PlayStation 2 counterpart, but IGN criticized it for its late release and their effort in completing a full game. However, IGN noted that the drum controller was an improvement over the original version, stating, "The pads are quieter and the kick pedal will withstand more abuse."

=== Sales ===
By October 9, 2008, the game sold four million units and generated global revenues of $600 million. As a result, Viacom had to pay developer Harmonix a bonus of more than $300 million. The sales of Rock Band helped Viacom to become the fifth-largest video game publisher in the United States, although analysts estimated that Viacom was only breaking even on sales of the game. In a March 2011 list, the NPD Group listed Rock Band as the fifth-highest-grossing video game in the United States since 1995, earning $670.7 million in revenue.

By May 2011, over 100 million songs had been downloaded from the Rock Band music store. Viacom estimated that it is averaging the sale of 1 million downloadable songs every 9 days. Sales of songs were in favor of hard rock bands; Mötley Crüe's single "Saints of Los Angeles", debuting as a Rock Band track at the same time as the release of the album of the same name, saw 48,000 Rock Band downloads and 14,000 iTunes downloads during its first week of release. The popularity of some tracks also led to groups considering releasing more material for the game. Rush's alternate version of "Working Man" released only for Rock Band was met with so much praise from players of Rock Band that the group released the song for download through iTunes, as well as considered making full albums available, which they went on to do for their 1981 album Moving Pictures, released for the game two months later.

=== Awards ===
Prior to the game's release, Rock Band was featured at the 2007 E3 convention, garnering attention and several awards, including the Game Critics' "Best of E3 2007" awards for "Best of Show," "Best Hardware/Peripheral," and "Best Social/Casual/Puzzle," 1UP.com's "Best of E3," and GameSpot's "Best Stage Demo" and "Best Xbox 360 Game."

After its release, Rock Band won dozens of awards covering game releases from 2007. The game won seven awards from IGN's "Best of 2007," receiving honors for "Best Music Game" for the Xbox 360 and PlayStation 3, "Best Local Multiplayer Game" for the Xbox 360 and PlayStation 3, "Best Downloadable Content" for the PlayStation 3, and "Best Console Peripheral," as well as overall awards for "Best Music Game," "Best Licensed Soundtrack," and "Best Local Multiplayer Game." GameSpot awarded Rock Band five awards in its "Best of 2007," recognizing the game for "Best Rhythm/Music Game," "Best New Gaming Hardware," "Best Downloadable Content," "Best Sound Design," and "Best Multiplayer Game." Wired, Official Xbox Magazine, and Ars Technica all named Rock Band the "Game of the Year," while Next Generation Magazine named it the second-best game of 2007. GamePro honored Rock Band with the "Innovation Award" for four-person cooperative play, as well as the selection of "Best Party Game" of 2007. GameSpy also recognized the game as the "Music Game of the Year" on the Xbox 360 and PlayStation 3. Additionally, Rock Band was awarded "Best Multiplayer Experience (console)" by 1UP.com. The game won two awards at the 2007 Spike Video Game Awards, receiving honors for "Best Rhythm Game" and "Best Soundtrack," while the game's developer, Harmonix, won "Studio of the Year." The game also won an award for "Best Multiplayer Game" in the X-Play Best of 2007 Awards. During the 11th Annual Interactive Achievement Awards, the Academy of Interactive Arts and Sciences awarded Rock Band with honors for three of the eight categories in which it was nominated (which included the "Overall Game of the Year" nomination), winning for "Family Game of the Year", "Outstanding Achievement in Soundtrack", and "Outstanding Innovation in Gaming". Rock Band was named "Best Party Game" of the year from Game Informer Magazine. The game has also been called the best rhythm game of all time by GameTap.

=== Cultural impact ===
Like the Guitar Hero series, Rock Band has had a significant impact on culture. Alex Rigopulos and Eran Egozy, the founders of Harmonix, were together named in Time Magazine's list of the 100 most influential people of 2008 for their creation of Rock Band. In the article, guitarist Steven Van Zandt claims, "in the history of rock 'n' roll, Rock Band may just turn out to be up there with the rise of FM radio, CDs, or MTV."

=== Sequel ===
Rock Band 2 was officially announced on June 30, 2008, and was released on September 14, 2008 on the Xbox 360, with other platform releases following later in the year. Original instruments from Rock Band are compatible with Rock Band 2, which features new instruments that been described as quieter and more reliable. Furthermore, both existing and any forthcoming downloadable content will be cross-compatible between Rock Band and Rock Band 2. Rock Band 2 saw enhancements to the existing Band World Tour mode, as well as inclusions of new "Drum Trainer" and "Battle of the Bands" modes. 55 of the 58 Rock Band songs can be exported for use in Rock Band 2, with the purchase of a $5 export key.

=== Patent litigation ===
On March 21, 2008, EA, MTV, and Harmonix were sued by the Gibson Guitar Corporation for violation of the 1999 U.S. patent 5,990,405, which Gibson claims covers technology that simulates a concert performance via pre-recorded audio and a musical instrument; this follows similar action that Gibson took against the Guitar Hero series, which was later settled out of court. The Gibson-Harmonix case was put on hold shortly after its filing to allow the United States Patent and Trademark Office to open a re-examination of the 405 patent. On subsequent review, the 405 patent was modified to more exactly define the type of musical instrument that the patent covers, as the original language had conflicted with U.S. patent 5,488,196. Due to the change in language, Harmonix sought to have the case go forward and requested a summary judgement, believing that the new language of the 405 patent did not include the Rock Band controllers. In mid 2010, the case was settled between all parties under non-disclosed terms.

On July 10, 2008, Konami filed a separate lawsuit against Harmonix, Viacom, and MTV attempting to block the sale of Rock Band, over infringement of their patents on a "musical-rhythm matching game" issued in 2002 and 2003, including U.S. patent 6,390,923. An MTV spokesperson expressed that the lawsuit was "extremely surprising" and that they intend to defend themselves against the suit. On December 2, 2008, Viacom issued a countersuit against Konami, claiming that Rock Band significantly improves on Konami's original patent, and that their Rock Revolution game uses controllers that are similar to Rock Band. Both suits were settled for undisclosed terms in September 2010.

== See also ==
- Guitar Hero World Tour
- Drum Machine
- Rock Revolution
- Ultimate Band
- Frets on Fire
- Fortnite Festival
