= Perfekte Welle =

2004 single by Juli

Single by Juli

from the album Es ist Juli
- Language: German
- English title: "Perfect Wave"
- Released: 2004
- Length: 3:20
- Songwriters: Andreas Herde; Simon Triebel
- Producer: O.L.A.F. Opal

Juli singles chronology
"Perfekte Welle" (2004)	"Geile Zeit" (2004)

"Perfekte Welle" (English: "Perfect Wave") is a song by German band Juli. It was written by band members Simon Triebel and Andreas Herde and produced by O.L.A.F. Opal for their debut album Es ist Juli (2004). It served as band's debut single and peaked at number two on the German and Austrian Single Charts. In December 2004, after the tsunami in south-east Asia, many German television and radio stations announced that they would no longer play the song as a mark of respect to the tsunami victims. An Afrikaans version was released in South Africa by the group Shine4, called "Perfekte Wêreld" (Perfect World).

== Formats and track listings ==
CD maxi single
No.	Title	Length
1.	"Perfekte Welle" (Radio Version)	3:16
2.	"Wenn du lachst" (Unplugged)	2:39
3.	"Perfekte Welle" (Album Version)	3:17
4.	"Lass mich nicht hängen" (Sofa Version)	3:05

== Charts ==
=== Weekly charts ===
Chart (2004)	Peak position
Austria (Ö3 Austria Top 40)	2
Germany (GfK)	2
Switzerland (Schweizer Hitparade)	18

=== Year-end charts ===
Chart (2004)	Position
Austria (Ö3 Austria Top 40)	27
Germany (Media Control GfK)	11

Chart (2005)	Position
Germany (Media Control GfK)	99

== Certifications ==
Region	Certification	Certified units/sales
Austria (IFPI Austria)	Gold	15,000^{*}
Germany (BVMI)	Gold	150,000^{^}
^{*} Sales figures based on certification alone.^{^} Shipments figures based on certification alone.
