= Ein neuer Tag =

Studio album by Juli
- Released: 13 October 2006
- Recorded: November 2005–July 2006
- Studio: Mohrmann Studio (Bochum)
- Length: 45:02
- Label: Universal
- Producer: O.L.A.F. Opal

Juli chronology
Es ist Juli (2004)	Ein neuer Tag (2006)	Ein neuer Tag – live (2007)

Ein neuer Tag (English: A New Day) is the second studio album by German band Juli, released on 13 October 2006 via Universal Records. Both a regular and deluxe edition of the album have been released; the latter includes a DVD containing the music video to "Dieses Leben", a road-movie and two making-of documentaries.

== Critical reception ==
Professional ratings
Review scores
Source	Rating
laut.de	4/5 stars

Artur Schulz from laut.de found that Ein neuer Tag "is very relaxed, sometimes loose and springy, sometimes intimate and dreamy or rocky, but never overloaded with unnecessary decoration. So well balanced, this variedly arranged bouquet of songs is a welcome eye-catcher and listener in the private music room. Some songs are reminiscent of colorful autumn leaves dancing through the (music) streets under a friendly October sun. So the darker months ahead of us are definitely fun: every now and then a little friendly, warming July sun shimmers through the clouds."

== Track listing ==
#	Title		Writer(s)
1.	"Dieses Leben" (This life)	4:34	Briegel, Herde, Pfetzing, Juergen Triebel
2.	"Du nimmst mir die Sicht" (You take away my sight)	3:19	Triebel
3.	"Bist du das" (Is that you)	4:23	Pfetzing
4.	"Zerrissen" (Torn)	3:23	Triebel
5.	"Ein neuer Tag" (A new day)	2:49	Briegel, Pfetzing
6.	"Wer von euch" (Who of you)	4:43	Pfetzing
7.	"Wir beide" (Both of us)	2:59	Briegel, Pfetzing
8.	"Egal wohin" (No matter where)	3:56	Briegel, Pfetzing
9.	"Das gute Gefühl" (The good feeling)	3:11	Triebel
10.	"Am besten sein" (To be the best)	3:13	Briegel, Herde, Triebel
11.	"Wenn du mich lässt" (If you let me)	3:33	Briegel, Pfetzing
12.	"Ein Gruß/Interlude" (A greeting)	14:54	Briegel, Pfetzing

== Personnel ==
- Eva Briegel – vocals
- Greg Calbi – engineer
- Peter Hinderthur – arranger
- Michael Ilbert – mixing
- Sebastian John – trombone
- Philipp Kacza – trumpet
- Roland Peil – percussion
- Jonas Pfetzing – guitar
- Marcel Römer – drums
- Simon Triebel – guitar
- Oli Zülch – engineer

== Charts ==
=== Weekly charts ===
Weekly chart performance for Ein neuer Tag
Chart (2006)	Peak position
Austrian Albums (Ö3 Austria)	4
German Albums (Offizielle Top 100)	3
Swiss Albums (Schweizer Hitparade)	1

=== Year-end charts ===
Year-end chart performance for Ein neuer Tag
Chart (2006)	Position
German Albums (Offizielle Top 100)	57

== Certifications ==
Certifications for Ein neuer Tag
Region	Certification	Certified units/sales
Germany (BVMI)	Platinum	200,000^{‡}
^{‡} Sales+streaming figures based on certification alone.
