= Eva Briegel =

German singer

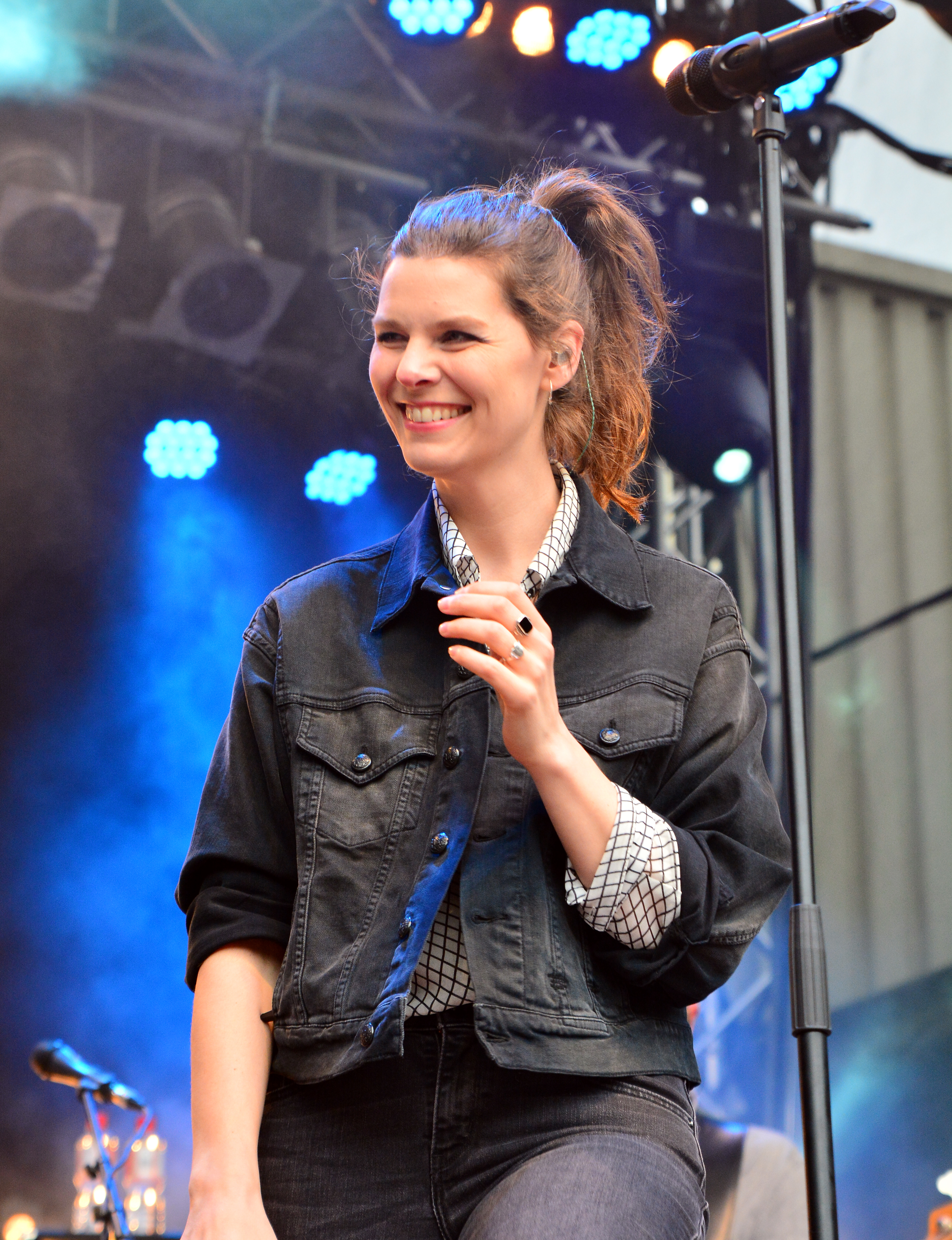
- Briegel in 2015
- Born: 3 December 1978 (age 47); Leonberg, West Germany
- Occupation: Musician
- Known for: Lead singer of pop rock band Juli

Eva Briegel (born 3 December 1978) is a German singer and member of the rock band Juli.

== Early life ==
Briegel's family lived in Böblingen in 1978, when Eva was born. In 1982 they moved to Langgöns, Hessen, where Eva attended primary school, before moving to Linden where Eva attended the Anne-Frank-Schule. After spending one year at the de:Liebigschule in Giessen (spelled Gießen in German) at the river Lahn, Eva finally graduated from Gesamtschule Gießen-Ost. In her last year of school Eva sang in a number of bands and for different projects and showed a strong interest in a career in music. However, she started to study Art History in Heidelberg and dropped out after the first semester. She then spent a number of years studying various subjects at the Justus-Liebig-Universität Gießen but never graduated. During this time she had various part-time jobs selling musical instruments and computers. Later she worked as waitress and barkeeper.

== Career ==
In 2000, Eva was asked by Goodwell Music to serve as a replacement singer for Miriam Adameit in the band Sunnyglade. She immediately agreed and became the new face of the band. In 2000, the band's name was changed to Juli (German for the month July). Although they originally sang songs with English lyrics, Juli returned to singing in their native language. Eva Briegel later said: "We didn't go back to German to find our identities, or anything – we just weren't good enough at English to express how we felt in our songs." The band has since released two successful albums, Es ist Juli (It's July, 2004) and Ein neuer Tag (A New Day, 2006), both of which reached multiple-platinum status.

== Personal life ==
Eva Briegel is a staunch vegetarian and is committed to the animal rights group, PETA.

== Discography ==
- Releases (German chart ranking) in Germany:
  - Title "Perfekte Welle" (2)
  - Title "Geile Zeit" (19)
  - Title "Regen und Meer" (31)
  - Title "Warum" (47)
  - Title "Dieses Leben" (5)
  - First Album "Es ist Juli" (2)
  - Second Album "Ein neuer Tag" (1)
  - Third Album "In Love"
  - Fourth Album "Der Sommer ist vorbei"
- Winners of the Bundesvision Song Contest on 12 February 2005
- Bambi in the category "Music national" on 30 November 2006
- "Eins Live Krone" (Radio Award) in the category "Best Band"
