= Juli (band) =

German pop band

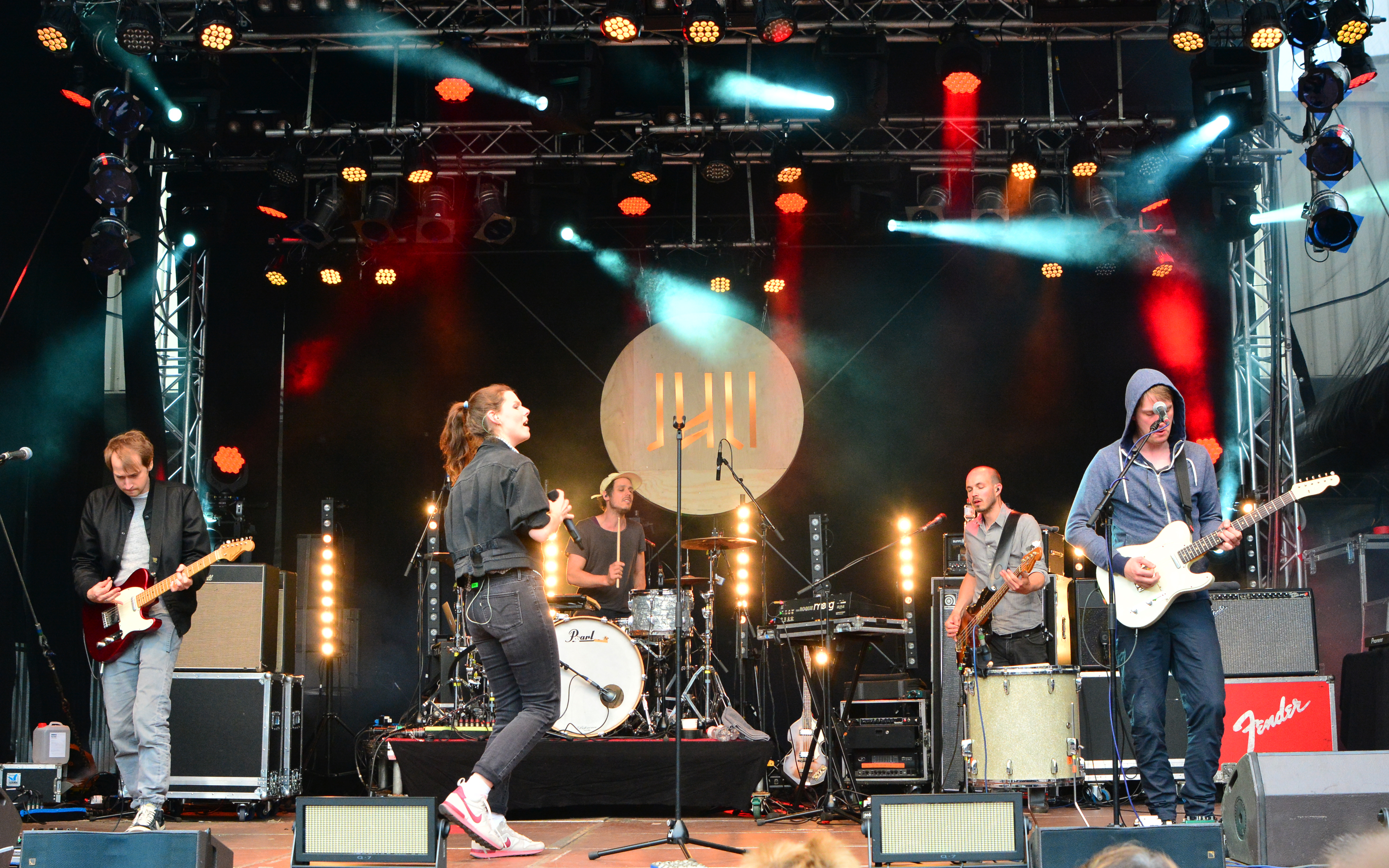
- Juli performing in 2015

Background information
- Origin: Gießen, Hesse, Germany
- Genres: German rock, pop
- Works: Discography
- Years active: 2001–present
- Labels: Universal
- Members: Eva Briegel; Marcel Römer; Andreas "Dedi" Herde; Jonas Pfetzing; Simon Triebel
- Past members: Miriam Adameit; Martin Möller
- Website: juli.tv

Juli (German pronunciation: [ˈjuːli]; German for "July") is a German alternative pop band from Gießen, Hessen, consisting of singer Eva Briegel, guitarists Jonas Pfetzing and Simon Triebel, bassist Andreas "Dedi" Herde and drummer Marcel Römer. The band was formed with this lineup from the band Sunnyglade in 2001.

== History ==
=== Sunnyglade to formation of Juli (1996–2003) ===
The band was formed under the name Sunnyglade in 1996 as an all-male band, consisting of Andreas "Dedi" Herde, Martin Möller (drums), Jonas Pfetzing, Marcel Römer and Simon Triebel, who was also the singer. A female lead singer, Miriam Adameit, soon joined the band. With this lineup, they recorded an album called Pictures of My Mind (1998), which sold 500 copies. When Adameit and Möller decided to leave the band in 2000, they were joined by Eva Briegel and Marcel Römer, and the list of band members has not changed since. At that time, the group (still calling itself Sunnyglade) focused on writing and performing songs with English lyrics, and they enjoyed their first major success when they won the Hessischer Rockpreis 2000 and finished second in the Deutscher Pop-Preis contest.

After the signing of their first recording contract with EMI in early 2001, Sunnyglade started working on recordings with producer Lutz Fahrenkrog-Petersen. Soon the quintet decided to turn to songs with German lyrics. At this time they also abandoned the name Sunnyglade and all their songs, and renamed themselves Juli, which they chose from the song with the same name by another band from Berlin called Tex.

The band's first gigs as Juli took place in June 2002 and they recorded their first professional demo in October 2002 with producer Michael Gerlach. Following positive feedback from various record labels, their music publisher decided to organize a showcase for 16 January 2003 at the Oxymoron in Berlin. Three months later, on 24 April, Universal Music organized an "Unplugged Showcase" for several artists in front of a jury. Singer Eva Briegel and guitarist Jonas Pfetzing contributed four songs in the name of the band. Presumably their record contract was a result of that performance; they got the contract on the recommendation of an A&R rep who had seen them perform on 16 January and recommended them. In August 2003, four years after they had set that goal, they signed their first recording contract at Popkomm in Cologne.

=== Es ist Juli (2004–2005) ===
In June 2004, Juli release their debut single "Perfekte Welle", which turned into a kind of anthem for the new rise in popularity of German song lyrics, and also gave its name to a collection of compilations of music with German lyrics (Perfekte Welle - Musik von hier). Though the single debuted at a modest number 38 on the German singles charts and instantly fell out of the top 40 in its second week, the song soon recovered and due to heavy radio airplay and massive CD single sales, "Perfekte Welle" finally entered the German top 10 in its eleventh week. The song peaked at number 2 four months after release and eventually received a Gold certification. It has sold over 160,000 copies in Germany. However, "Perfekte Welle" (German for "Perfect Wave") was the subject of controversy and was banned from radio and TV stations after the 2004 Indian Ocean earthquake (see below). The song later became and currently is available for download for Rock Band, the video game.

The band's critically acclaimed debut album Es ist Juli was released in September 2004 and peaked at #2 in Germany, #4 in Austria and #7 in Switzerland, selling more than 700,000 copies within a few months. By July 2006, it had sold over 1 million copies, and thus reached the status of a quadruple platinum record. Though the album became the fourth most successful album of the year (it stayed in the German top 25 charts for a complete year) and it spawned another four singles, only "Geile Zeit", the album's second single, made it into the German Top 20.

In 2005, the group represented Hesse in the Bundesvision Song Contest 2005, with the song "Geile Zeit", placing 1st with 159 points. In July the same year, Juli participated in the Berlin Live 8 concert.

After participating in a radio-tour organized by Eins Live through Nordrhein-Westfalen in September 2004, Juli started their own club tour through Germany, which was completely sold out. After that followed a tour opening for Rosenstolz through Germany, Austria, and Switzerland.

After the tsunami disaster in southeast Asia in December 2004, when tidal waves killed more than 280,000 people, most radio stations took "Perfekte Welle" out of rotation right away, because, according to them, its lyrics had become involuntarily ambiguous and could cause offense. The song is actually about a surfer who is waiting for a wave to ride on, a metaphor for taking chances after long periods of waiting and hoping. Apparently at various radio stations during the first few days after the catastrophe, because of auto rotation, the song popped up right after reports from the affected area, and some of the audience considered this to be deliberate sarcasm. Some fans tried to convince the stations that the song had a positive message and nothing to do with the disaster, but the band and Universal Music showed understanding with the stations.

In February 2005, the "Es ist Juli" tour started, in which the band played many concerts and festival gigs. They spent most of the 2005 on tour. They also participated in the Live 8 concert in Berlin, where they performed the songs "Geile Zeit" and "Perfekte Welle". At that time three more singles were released: "Regen und Meer", "Warum", and "November", but none had the same success as their predecessor. The video of "Regen und Meer" got some attention in the media, because the band was playing the part of a terrorist group from 1977 and referred directly to the Red Army Faction (RAF) and the abduction and murder of Hanns-Martin Schleyer.

=== Ein neuer Tag (2006–2009) ===
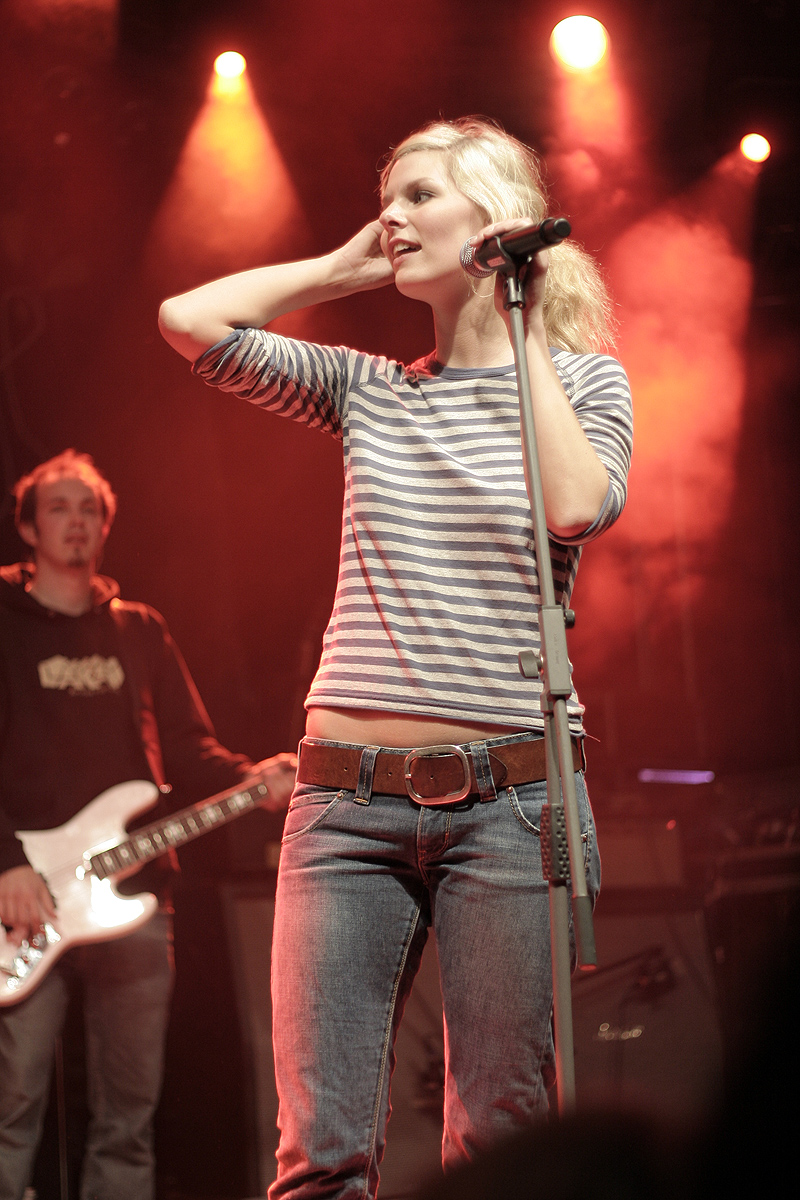
Eva Briegel live on the Ein neuer Tag tour.

From third quarter 2005 onwards, the band made very few official appearances, choosing instead to retreat to Bochum to work on their second studio album. The band decided to keep the overall tone of the album quieter and more mature than their previous one. During 2006 they played mainly in festivals, such as the Schlossgrabenfest, Donauinselfest, and the Soundgarden Festival. In July 2006, the new album was finally completed. The time before the release of the album Ein neuer Tag (A New Day) was filled with PR work. On 22 September 2006 the first single from the album "Dieses Leben" was released, and it hit the top 5 single charts right away. On 13 October Ein neuer Tag finally hit the album charts. It sold 75,000 copies within the first week and reached position 18 in the World United Album Charts, and with more than 200,000 pre-orders, it had already reached platinum status by the release date.

On 30 November 2006 Juli won the German Bambi-award in the category music national, and on 7 December 2006 they were awarded the Eins-Live-Krone, Germany's most important radio listener award.

After the release of "Wir Beide", the second single from the album, Juli started touring to support Ein neuer Tag. Some of the concerts sold out weeks in advance or had to be moved into larger venues. After playing in festivals in summer, they will start the second leg of their tour in autumn.

Originally they had planned "Am Besten sein" to be their next single, which was to be released in January 2007. However, the third single finally was "Zerrissen".

On 7 July 2007 Juli performed at the German leg of Live Earth in Hamburg.

In April 2007, the song Stolen by Dashboard Confessional was rerecorded as a duet between lead singer Eva Briegel and Chris Carrabba and released on 27 July 2007.

In September 2007, there were a couple of new releases. On 21 September, the song "Ein neuer Tag" from the album of the same name was released. One week later, on 28 September, a live DVD and a live album was released, both with the name "Ein neuer Tag - live".

Juli do not see themselves as a rock band, but call their own music style "alternative pop". They put high expectations into their lyrics and are always trying to reach more of an adult audience rather than teenagers.

Juli are one of Germany's most-played bands on the radio; their first three singles ("Perfekte Welle", "Geile Zeit", and "Regen und Meer") all reached the top of Germany's airplay charts and all remained in the Top 10 for several months. "Dieses Leben" also repeated this success. It remained number one for five consecutive weeks. They also managed to reach the top 5 with their current single.

=== In Love and Insel (2010–2019) ===
The last tour concerts for the album Ein Neuer Tag took place in late 2007. Following these, Juli announced that they would take a break from music. Around one year later, they published pictures and videos of their recording studio on Myspace. In September 2010 they released their third studio album, In Love. "Elektrisches Gefühl" (Electrical Feeling) was released as the album's first single, reaching number 12 in the German Singles Chart. It debuted on radio in July 2010 and was released on 27 August 2010. Second single "Immer wenn es dunkel wird" (Whenever it is dark) was released later in 2010 and charted at number 37 in Germany.

In September 2013 Juli announced on their facebook page that they are working on a new album. On 13 June 2014 the band made an appearance at Kieler Woche and played two new songs, including the first Single Insel (Island) which was released as a download on 12 September 2014. The second single Jetzt (Now) was released on 19 September 2014, the third single Eines Tages (Someday) followed on 26 September 2014. Both were, like the first single, released exclusively as a download. The album Insel was released on 3 October 2014 as a download and on CD. It reached number 10 in the German charts and thus the lowest placement of all Juli albums.

=== Der Sommer ist vorbei (2020–present) ===
The band released a new single, Fahrrad (Bike), on April 26, 2019. However, it did not make it into the German single charts. The single was followed by a few more festival appearances, but - partly due to the COVID-19 pandemic that began in Germany in spring 2020 - no further releases and no tour of their own for the time being. In 2021 and 2022, Universal Music released the five digital Juli EP's: Nacht (Night), Da draußen (Out There), Liebe (Love), Wanderlust and Retrovibes (Retro Vibes), which did not contain any new material, but were compilations of well-known tracks.

The band's first new single since 2019, Fette wilde Jahre (Big Wild Years), was released on September 16, 2022, followed by the single Der Sommer ist vorbei (Summer is Over) on November 11, 2022. In 2023, the songs Gehen oder bleiben (To Stay or To Go) (released on March 3, 2023), Wolke (Cloud) (released on April 7, 2023) and Irgendwann (Someday) (released on April 21, 2023) followed.

On April 28, 2023, the fifth studio album Der Sommer ist vorbei (Summer is Over) was released after eight and a half years. In May 2023, the band went on their first German tour again, although some concerts had to be postponed due to Eva Briegel's illness. The band also recorded a concert at the Bauhaus Dessau as part of the 3sat series Pop Around @ Bauhaus. On September 15, 2023, Eva Briegel, Simon Triebel and Jonas Pfetzing performed at a rally for the 13th global climate strike by Fridays for Future in front of the Brandenburger Tor.

== Relationships to other bands ==
At the same time as Juli started out with their success, there were a couple of other bands with German lyrics who experienced a breakthrough. Just before Juli rose to fame, the bands Wir sind Helden (first release in 2003) and Silbermond (first release in March 2004) for example, celebrated their first success. The fact that all 3 of those bands appear with a female singer and German lyrics got them a lot of attention at first. From the start of their career they had to face such comparisons, which they strictly disclaimed. One thing that is clearly missed out in that case is that all three bands were already writing German songs, and played with the same line up before their first recording contract. In particular Silbermond, whose career started out similar to Juli's as a student band singing English songs, they are frequently compared to Wir Sind Helden by the media, which both bands consider nonsense.

Juli have recently appeared in a Dashboard Confessional music video where lead singer Eva Briegel also sang.

== Discography ==
- Es ist Juli (2004)
- Ein neuer Tag (2006)
- In Love (2010)
- Insel (2014)
- Der Sommer ist vorbei (2023)

== Awards ==
- 2004
  - Bravo Otto category Shootingstar
- 2005
  - Bundesvision Song Contest winner with Geile Zeit
  - Goldene Schallplatte
    - 5× Gold and 3× Platinum for Es ist Juli (Album) in Germany
    - 1× Gold for Perfekte Welle (Single)
    - in each case 1× Gold and 1× Platinum for Es ist Juli (Album) in Austria and Switzerland
- 2006
  - European Border Breakers Award for the best selling German debut album in Europe not including Germany (September 2004 to August 2005)
  - Bambi Category Musik national
  - Eins Live Krone Category Best Band
  - Gold record
    - 2× Gold and 1× Platinum for Ein Neuer Tag (Album)
