= Rock Band 4 =

2015 music video game

- Developer: Harmonix
- Publisher: Harmonix
- Series: Rock Band
- Platforms: PlayStation 4; Xbox One
- Release: October 6, 2015
- Genre: Rhythm
- Modes: Single-player, multiplayer

Rock Band 4 is a 2015 rhythm game developed and published by Harmonix. The game was initially distributed by Mad Catz, who also developed new instrument controllers for the game, for PlayStation 4 and Xbox One on October 6, 2015. Performance Designed Products (PDP) took over manufacturing of instrument controllers and distribution of the game by 2016. It is the fourth main installment and the ninth console release in the Rock Band series.

Rock Band 4 allows players to simulate the playing of music across many different decades and genres using instrument controllers that mimic playing lead and bass guitar, drums, and vocals. The game shipped with more than sixty licensed songs; additional songs are available as downloadable content, which includes a library of over 2000 existing songs from prior installments.

Rock Band 4 represented Harmonix's return to the franchise after an almost three-year hiatus, following the diminishing popularity of the rhythm game market that started in 2009. Announced on March 5, 2015, Rock Band 4 refocuses on the core gameplay of the franchise, reducing the emphasis on musical instruction that was employed by its predecessor, Rock Band 3, while emphasizing the game's social interactions, as well as new features enabling players to incorporate improvisation into their performance—such as "freestyle solos" on guitar, and "freeform melodies" on multi-part vocals.

Rock Band 4 offers backward compatibility with content and hardware from previous versions of Rock Band within the same console family; wireless guitar and drum controllers from PlayStation 3 and Xbox 360 versions of Rock Band can be used on the PS4 and Xbox One versions (with Xbox One requiring a newly produced USB dongle and PS4 not requiring any new hardware), and DLC songs purchased on prior installments on PS3 and Xbox 360 can be re-downloaded at no extra charge on PS4 and Xbox One in a ported form that supports the game's features. Harmonix released free and paid DLC that added new features and content to the game over time, in lieu of releasing yearly installments; this included the addition of support for synchronous online play added on January 25, 2017.

Critical reception to Rock Band 4 on-launch was positive, with reviews praising the game for not significantly deviating from the gameplay mechanics of prior installments, as well as the higher degree of creative freedom offered by the Freestyle Solos feature, and its backward compatibility with previously released content for the Rock Band franchise. The game was however criticized for lacking features present in previous versions, such as online multiplayer and practice modes.

The last DLC for Rock Band 4 was released in January 2024, after 8 years of weekly content. In October 2025, the game was delisted from the Playstation and Xbox digital stores due to music licenses expiring on the game's 10-year anniversary. The game and DLC remains playable for those who own it, but is no longer available for purchase.

== Gameplay ==
The gameplay of Rock Band 4 follows that from previous games in the series: the player or group of players use special instrument-based controllers or microphones, often based on real instruments such as a Fender Stratocaster or a Jaguar, to mimic playing the instruments by following scrolling cues on screen and attempt to play through a song and score points. Players score points for successfully hitting notes, earning a scoring multiplier for hitting a continuous series of notes without mistakes, while failure to hit the right notes can penalize the players' performance and could end the song prematurely. During the song, certain phrases are marked with specially colored notes, which if played correctly, fills the player's Overdrive meter. Once sufficiently filled, the player is able to trigger "Overdrive" through various means depending on instrument, which doubles their scoring multiplier as well as boosting the band's overall performance meter. Players are rated using a five-star system based on their score, and possibly earning a gold star rating if playing on Expert difficulty with a high score.

When Rock Band 4 launched, the game supported three main modes. Quickplay allows the players to select any song to play that is on disc or in the downloadable content library of songs. Players can also engage in "Shows" which are a series of songs broken up into a number of sets. Some songs in these Shows are predetermined, but others are left to be voted on during a short period between songs by the band members; individual members also have the opportunity to select a song from a limited list during periods of the current song when their musical part is inactive. The available options are based on what songs the collective band members have in their library and the band's chosen theme, and voting options may include specific songs (including one selected mid-song), or broad classifications such as by genre type, release year, or song length. To aid in the cooperative nature of the game, any scoring multipliers and remaining Overdrive are carried over between songs in Gig lists as well as between sets in the Career mode.

The main mode for Rock Band 4 is a Band Tour career mode which IGN described as a role-playing game. Within the narrative of the Band Tour, the players' band starts off as a small town group with a handful of fans. En route to becoming more popular and successful, the players are tasked with the option of what types of gigs they want their band to play, with various risks and rewards that influence: how many fans the group attains per geographic region; what future gigs they will have available; and how much in-game money they earn (which can be spent customizing their band's clothes and instruments). While there are a number of possible sets that the band can select from with more unlocked as the players progresses in the game, the primary means of advancing the band's narrative is through multi-part Tours which consist of 3 to 6 different shows to be played in order. At the start of each of these Tours, the players will have two options that will affect what type of song sets they will see on the tour and the benefits of completing each set and the overall Tour. For example, players are able to have their band take a corporate-sponsored gig, which will earn the band a large amount of in-game money, but may impact their band's reputation and limit future venues, while taking on smaller shows will not produce as much money, but increase the band's renown and open more possible gigs. Subsequent Tours may require the players to earn more stars from other, single Sets that are available, before that tour is available.

Sets during Band Tours may feature pre-determined song lists or song lists decided by the band similar to the main Sets mode, with available songs limited to certain criteria as overall band difficulty or genre type. Players may also be presented with the option to swap out a song for a crowd-requested one, or to also play an encore song in the same manner as with Sets. The band is not only rated on their general performance based on the five star rating, but as well as the players' stage presence impact the rewards from these gigs, which are based on how well the band performs in unison, such as hitting "Overdrive" together, drummers completing drum fills, and vocalists improvising. Taking crowd requests and completing encores also boosts this stage presence. These will increase the rewards in terms of fans and money at the end of a successful set.

With Freestyle solos, the guitar player (rightmost track) can improvise their solo, using guides provided by the game, here showing the transition from a chord-heavy to single-note riffs (pre-release visuals shown).

Rock Band 4 now has the use of Freestyle Guitar Solos, an optional feature. If this feature is disabled, guitar solos in songs are presented as they were in previous Rock Band games with more of the same note-matching aspects in beat with the original song's solo; the player scores as they normally do as during regular song sections, with an added scoring bonus based on the percentage of the solo notes hit correctly. When this feature is enabled, instead of the predefined solo, the game shows suggestions for the solo style to emulate at that time, such as single notes or longer licks, chords, or tremolos, using different patterns to highlight the guitar player's on-screen track. The track markings also indicate which set of fret keys on the instrument control to use, which determine the pitch of the notes. Players cannot fail these freestyle sections, but they are scored on how well they hit the suggested style during the segment, and they can retain their scoring multiplier by performing the proper playing style on each section of the solo. The game includes tutorials to help explain these mechanics to players. Further, the audio feedback from these solos has been refined as to make whatever the player performs stay consistent and in-tune with the other active and backing instruments.

Drums players for Rock Band 4 are able to count down to start the song as often done by real-life bands. Rock Band 4 will change how the drummer can trigger overdrive: unlike past titles, where the drummer would gain a free-form section and then strike a specific pad to activate overdrive, which Harmonix found would throw some players off, Rock Band 4 presents one of a random number of pre-created drum fills that fit the timing of the song when the drummer player has Overdrive available. This feature is backward compatible with all previous songs in the Rock Band library.

Vocal players are able to use two- or three-part harmonies as previously used in The Beatles: Rock Band and Rock Band 3, and through contributions from the Rock Band fan community, existing Rock Band songs that feature vocal harmonies but originally released for the series without harmony support, is updated to include harmonies. Higher difficulty settings for vocals allow for "freeform melodies" where as long as the vocalist is in tune, they can improvise to a degree to add their personal touch to a song. This improvisation is scored separately from the in-tune scoring, thus presenting an additional challenge for this advanced mode.

As with previous Rock Band titles, the players has the ability to create custom avatars for their band members within the game, which are displayed in the background visuals while playing through a song. The avatars have several custom aspects such as hair styling, make-up, clothing, and instruments. In-game money can be used to purchase more customization options, while some come as rewards for completing certain parts of the game. Rock Band 4 ships with more pre-made characters to allow players to get into the game faster, and atop more options from previous games, removes restrictions on gender-fixed items; for example, mustaches and beards were only an option for male characters in previous games.

In an interview with Vice in June 2015, Sussman stated that the game would not initially ship with support for online play, as surveys taken prior to release, and their own tracking, showed that only about 10% of previous Rock Band players used the online feature, and thus focused on building out the local play features first for release. Sussman commented that it may be released as part of future patches to the title. The game at launch did support online leaderboards and score tracking at launch, and has added additional asynchronous features since. In April 2016, Harmonix announced that it will add in synchronous online play by the end of 2016. In December 2016, Harmonix delayed the online addition until January 25, 2017, to make sure this feature covered all edge cases that they had encountered in testing.

== Post-release content ==
Rock Band 4 is designed by Harmonix as a platform title which can be updated periodically, as opposed to releasing new disc-based versions. These updates are anticipated to include bug fixes and new gameplay features to the base game. Many of the updates are based on feedback from players about the game.

The first major update released on December 8, 2015, includes addition of "variable breakneck speed" which allows players to change the rate of scrolling notes on screen, and an auto bass-kick option that will remove the need for drum players to hit the bass pedal and focus only on the drum pad notes. "Brutal mode" is a challenge mode where, as the player continues doing well on a song, the notes on the scrolling highway will disappear some time after they appear on it, but will still need to be played on time; the speed at which they disappear is based on how well the player is playing, and by clearing the song with what would normally be gold stars, the player earns "Crimson Stars" instead. A new "Score Challenge" gameplay mode will allow players to track what their friends are playing and then asynchronously challenge their scores on the same song, including light-hearted taunts should they win.

A February 2016 update (originally slated for January but pushed back) implemented a number of features to prevent high score cheating via game exploits, as well as changing the nature of non-Tour mode shows to allow their scores to be included in leaderboards. To effect this change, Harmonix had to wipe existing leaderboards, but in the future if similar exploits are found, they will be able to adjust leaderboards for specific songs and instruments.

Playlists were added as part of the game's April 2016 update, and a practice mode and enhanced sort sorting were added with the June 2016 update. The late 2016 updates will also coincide with the release of updated controllers from Performance Designed Products, as announced in March 2016. Harmonix released a patch to include online play on January 25, 2017, an oft-requested feature since Rock Band 4's launch; this will require players to have purchased the Rivals expansion (described below).

Updates have included additional clothing and instruments for the in-game characters, including Vault suits as part of a promotional tie-in in Bethesda's Fallout 4, the goggle headgear worn by the protagonist Raz from Double Fine Productions' Psychonauts, outfits for characters from Gearbox Software's Battleborn, and instruments and outfits inspired by Mass Effect: Andromeda. A March 2017 update included a special cel-shaded Sterling Archer avatar from the animated show Archer, developed in conjunction with Floyd County Productions and FXX.

An update to the game was released alongside Rivals; it brought back advanced song filtering options (including the ability to sort songs by their source game) and a song rating system, both present in Rock Band 3, and introduced a refreshed, dark blue interface theme. These changes are available to all players, regardless of whether they have purchased the expansion or not.

Sussman has asserted that they do not plan to bring back keyboard support that had been in Rock Band 3, seeing it diverge from their current target for Rock Band 4.

=== Expansions ===
In addition to free updates to the game, Harmonix has planned to release purchasable expansions to Rock Band 4, adopting a model similar to such paid expansions on Destiny and World of Warcraft.

The first and only paid expansion, Rock Band Rivals, was released on October 18, 2016. The expansion includes two new game modes. The Rivals mode allows up to ten players to form Crews which their collective scoring across songs in an asynchronous manner will be used in challenges against other Crews. This mode includes online scoreboards, weekly challenges, and new rewards in the form of avatar clothing and instruments. Crews compete to be ranked across six tiers based on total score for three spotlight songs and experience gained from other songs in the weekly challenge; only Crews with the highest average rankings based on set percentages of total Crews can be promoted to higher tiers, while Crews with low average rankings could be demoted. Rivals mode was designed to address the issue that trying to coordinate all members of a band to play at the same time could be difficult. The second mode is a story-driven Rockudrama, which use live-action footage as part of the narrative, inspired by documentaries such as Behind the Music. These segments bookends various sets, and includes selected comments that reflect on the performance, good or bad, that a given player might have during that. Players gain Fame by earning stars in these sets, which are needed to progress further in the Rockudrama, and by achieving a specific amount of fame over several sets, the player can unlock new venues that will appear in other gameplay areas of Rock Band 4. Rock Band Rivals itself did not include additional songs at launch, although those who pre-ordered the expansion received up to twelve new songs for free; these songs were later released for sale to other users. The December 2016 update to Rivals provided twelve free songs to all owners from local Boston bands that were part of the interviews for the Rockumentary game mode. The January 2017 update added the Online Quickplay mode and one additional free song to Rivals.

In a May 2017 patch for Rivals, the Rivals mode switched to an 8-week Seasonal system, rewarding Crews for placement at the end of the season with unique in-game gear, and eliminating demotions. The update also introduced Missions, similar to the Challenges used in Rock Band 3, that require players to meet certain goals to complete; some of these will include Missions for Crews as well as single-player challenges. Completing Missions earns unique badges players can showcase on their user profile in-game. The new server architecture of Rock Band 4 allowed Harmonix to update and add Missions over time without having to patch the game. With the second Season in this new format, Harmonix offers a Season Spotlight Pass that gives the purchaser eight new songs over that Season that are featured as Spotlight songs in the Rivals challenges at a small discount over buying all eight songs individually.

== Development ==
Rhythm games like Rock Band and Guitar Hero had been widely popular during 2005 to 2008, but due to oversaturation of the market and the onset of the 2009 recession, the rhythm genre suffered major setbacks, and the genre's popularity had quickly waned. Harmonix had released Rock Band 3 in 2010, and while well received by critics and fans, had only an estimated one million retail sales, lagging behind its dancing game, Dance Central, released during the same period. Harmonix would continue to support Rock Band 3 through 2013 with additional content patches and over 280 consecutive weeks of new songs provided as downloadable content (DLC), as well as producing Rock Band Blitz, an arcade-like rhythm game that did not require instrument controllers, but used existing music libraries. In April 2013, Harmonix released its last regular DLC, stating that they were focusing on other projects. The company noted that they would look to reintroduce Rock Band in the future, when they felt the time was right to bring back the game.

Development of Rock Band 4 began in the last quarter of 2014. This followed from several factors. Harmonix's former CEO and current creative director Alex Rigopulos explained that the studio had awaited both a "critical mass" of adoption for the next-generation consoles, and a "clear and compelling creative vision" for the game before beginning work on a successor—prompting the franchise's hiatus. Rigopulos said that internally if they were going to bring back Rock Band, they wanted to "really make the best game that we had ever made; that we had a vision for what Rock Band 4 was going to be, that made it worth making, really". A clear vision of the goals for the game came about more than a year prior to the game's release. Harmonix's Greg LoPiccolo added that they did not want to try to introduce Rock Band 4 during the new consoles' first year where they would have to compete with major franchises. Funding for development was aided by $15 million in investments from Spark Capital and Foundry Group, not only to support Rock Band 4 but the remake of Harmonix' Amplitude and future projects involving virtual reality.

Following the aggressive focus on musical instruction within Rock Band 3, Rock Band 4 instead puts a larger focus on the franchise's core gameplay, multiplayer, and the overall feeling of the experience; Rigopulos felt that the franchise had become too "sprawling" in functionality, and that "there is an existing gameplay core that is very powerful and very fun, and we don't want to tamper with that core. At the same time, we need to bring something new to the experience." Owing to this renewed focus, the Pro Guitar and piano keyboard modes were dropped from the game. Rigopulos stated that Ubisoft's competing Rocksmith series "is serving the audience that wants actual guitar instrumental instruction very well." The new Freestyle Guitar Solo feature was something that Harmonix had built a prototype for in early 2014; at the time they did not have a clear concept of its use but found the mechanic to have potential and built up parts of Rock Band 4 around it. Rigopulos also noted that they were not trying to develop Rock Band 4 with competition from Guitar Hero Live in mind; that competition had caused the original over-saturation of the rhythm game market in 2009. With Rock Band 4, Harmonix' goal is a smaller but known fraction of the market of both old Rock Band players and new ones, such that meeting those numbers would make the game financially viable even if it does not outsell Guitar Hero Live. This goal also helps to manage the costs of the game as they do not have to manufacture as many instrument sets as they had done previously.

Harmonix developed a new game engine called Forge, also used for their remake of Amplitude, to take advantage of the upgraded hardware of the PlayStation 4 and Xbox One, allowing the game to run at 1080p at 60 frames per second; product manager Eric Pope stated that the engine included better lighting, character models, and animation. The game was not released for the Wii U or the personal computer market, with product manager Daniel Sussman stating that two issues that would limit a personal computer version is existing music availability, and the lack of security for the specific music tracks which the PlayStation and Xbox consoles already possess. Sussman stated that either platform could be possible in the future if there is market demand, but their present focus was the safest route to bringing Rock Band to mass market through the major console platforms.

On January 13, 2015, Harmonix announced three new DLC songs, the first in nearly 21 months. The sudden release, along with a survey posted by Harmonix a few days later, indicated the possibility that the studio was planning to develop a new Rock Band game for eighth generation consoles. On March 5, 2015, Harmonix officially announced Rock Band 4.

Rock Band 4 is expected to be the only retail release of the franchise for the current generation of consoles; Rigopulos called the multiple-release cycle "taxing" on both the studio and consumers, and instead sees the game as a platform which they can continuously improve over the life of the title without excessive work. In August 2015, Harmonix stated that they already have plans for post-release patches, both free and paid, to add new gameplay functionality to expand the Rock Band 4 title, with plans to release a free patch in December 2015 to include an option for "Variable Breakneck Speed", which affects the rate at which notes scroll on the screen, among other features.

In March 2016, Harmonix launched a crowd funding campaign through the Fig platform to produce Rock Band 4 for personal computers, to have been released in the last quarter of 2016. Harmonix estimated the game would cost $2 million to make, of which they would contribute $500,000 towards if they can raise the remaining $1.5 million. The port would have been primarily handled by Sumo Digital, integrating the updates that Harmonix will continue to provide in the main game. The game would have been released via Steam, allowing users to use the Steam Workshop to create their own songs and distribute it to others, with curation by Harmonix to avoid copyright infringements, in a manner comparable to the Rock Band Network but at a lower cost; they have already ported the previous Rock Band Network tools to offer to backers of the campaign. Harmonix planned to allow compatibility with all existing instrument controllers from the various PlayStation 2, 3 and 4, and Xbox 360 and One platforms, and had begun working through details with Sony and Microsoft. The game would have shipped with the same 65 songs as the console version, and at least 1700 songs for downloadable content (all those currently available for Rock Band 4 on consoles), though, as with the console versions, users would have had to repurchase these songs on the PC and cannot transfer over songs they already own on either platform. The funding campaign failed to reach its goal, only obtaining about $793,000 of the $1.5M target; Harmonix has not ruled out approaching a personal computer version in the future as they are aware there is some demand for Rock Band there.

Harmonix affirmed that with the backward compatibility of both the Xbox Series X and S and PlayStation 5 consoles released in November 2020, that Rock Band 4 are playable on the new consoles with most of the officially-supported instruments that worked on Xbox One and PlayStation 4, and that players are able to bring over all downloadable content they had purchased to the new consoles. Further, players within the same console family (PlayStation 4 and PlayStation 5, for example) will be able to use the online multiplayer features together. Harmonix plans to continue to support the game with further DLC after the new console's launch.

Following the acquisition of Harmonix by Epic Games in 2021, they confirmed that support for Rock Band 4 (including future downloadable content) would be unaffected by the acquisition. On December 14, 2022, Epic announced that they would shutdown the "out-of-date" online services for numerous older games (including all older Rock Band games) due to the company's focus on Epic Online Services. While Rock Band 4 was unaffected by this move, it was instead updated to add Epic Online Services (including a requirement for an Epic Games account in order to access the game's online features) to the game's online services. With Harmonix transitioning to work on the Fortnite Festival mode within Fortnite, which shares many similarities in gameplay as with Rock Band 4, the developers will no longer offer new DLC for Rock Band 4 after January 25, 2024, though the game's online services and Rivals seasons will continue for the foreseeable future.

=== Hardware ===
==== First generation ====
At launch, Mad Catz handled the global production, sales, and promotion of the retail game, while Harmonix handled the digital content and sales. Mad Catz developed updated guitar and drum controllers for Rock Band 4; the company noted that while it did not want to "reinvent the wheel", the controllers still featured technical improvements, such as reduced wireless latency and a more sensitive tilt sensor on the guitar. Guitars feature switches that have much longer lifetimes compared to previous controllers, while the drum controller included reinforced pads to prevent damage to the sensor, and includes a double-bass kick setup out of the box. The drum kit can be expanded with an optional set of three hit-sensitive pads that act as cymbals, which allow the player to use the game's "Pro Drum" mode as introduced in Rock Band 3; in this mode, certain gems will be marked as cymbal hits instead of drum hits, requiring the player to make that distinction to score points. The microphone had also been redesigned, and is able to sample at a higher rate to help with the vocal improvisation sections. At PAX East, a special Penny Arcade-themed guitar with artwork of Gabe was made available as a limited edition exclusive.

Harmonix stated that it had "aggressively" worked with console manufacturers on means to allow guitar and drum controllers from the PlayStation 3 and Xbox 360 versions of Rock Band to be forward compatible with Rock Band 4; Harmonix and Mad Catz both agreed that while technically difficult to complete, this compatibility was necessary to support the Rock Band community. Rock Band 4 on PlayStation 4 natively supports PlayStation 3 Rock Band instruments by means of the USB dongle that they require to operate. Achieving backward compatibility with Xbox 360 instruments was more difficult, as they had used the console's native wireless controller capabilities instead, which had changed between the Xbox 360 and Xbox One. On Xbox One, standalone copies of Rock Band 4 are bundled with a "Legacy Adapter" to allow use of wireless Xbox 360 instrument controllers, including those developed to support Guitar Hero games. Due to the inclusion of this hardware, the retail price of Rock Band 4 on Xbox One was higher than the PS4 version.

The Adapter was developed by Mad Catz by experimenting with all legacy Xbox 360 controllers they wanted to support and verifying what inputs they sent via wireless connection. They also worked with a former Microsoft employee that had experience with the Xbox 360's wireless features for additional insight. Existing USB microphones remain compatible with Rock Band 4. Harmonix was also working to get backward compatibility for the Stage Kit, an add-on hardware unit for Xbox 360 owners that allowed for a smoke machine and light show display in time with the song. Owing to the game's focus on core gameplay, and concerns that consumers may be unwilling to buy additional hardware for specific games early in a console generation's lifecycle, Rock Band 4 did not feature additional accessories. At retail, the game is available in a band bundle, with a guitar, drum, and microphone, and a guitar-only bundle.

==== Second generation ====
In March 2016, Harmonix announced that Mad Catz would be replaced by Performance Designed Products (PDP) as Rock Band 4's co-publisher and hardware partner later in the year, with updated hardware to be released at that time to coincide with the upcoming Rivals expansion for the game. In June 2016, Harmonix announced they had signed an extension with their deal with Fender to continue use the name and branding within the Rock Band series through 2027, and that new peripheral hardware based on Fender's instruments would be available soon.

During E3 2016, PDP and Harmonix unveiled new hardware that was released alongside the Rock Band Rivals expansion. A new guitar controller based on the Fender Jaguar features improvements to the strum bar and tilt sensor, while its neck can fold down for easier storage. An optional rechargeable battery pack and charging stand for the Jaguar controller was also unveiled. A new full band bundle featuring Rock Band 4 and the Rivals expansion, a Jaguar guitar and a drumkit shipped alongside the digital release of the Rivals expansion in late 2016. With the PDP-supplied instruments, Harmonix will be able to offer the instrument-and-game bundles at lower cost than on the game's initial release; for example, the game and guitar bundle on release initially had a MSRP of $120, but the new bundle will be priced at $90. While part of this reduction in cost is attributed to the age of the game, Sussman stated that several factors relating to PDP's manufacturing and business models allows them to offer the packages at a more competitive price point.

PDP had also offered a wired legacy adapter for use with wired instruments (such as first-generation Rock Band hardware and the Ion Drum Rocker) and the Rock Band 3 MIDI-Pro Adapter. However, following its initial shipment in November 2016, PDP affirmed that their terms of licensing with Harmonix only allowed them to produce a limited number of the units, less than the demand that was found for the device.

==== Third generation ====
In January 2024, PDP unveiled the Riffmaster wireless guitar, which is designed for compatibility with Rock Band 4 and the Harmonix-developed Fortnite Festival; it uses an ambidextrous design with a folding neck, and adds a headphone jack and a swappable pickguard. A year later, in February 2025, CRKD would unveil their own Gibson Les Paul wireless guitars, also designed for compatibility for Rock Band 4 and Fortnite Festival, with the premium Pro Edition controller featuring new mechanical frets, a strum bar with haptic feedback, and strum and whammy bars using hall-effect sensors.

With most of its ten-year licenses expiring, Rock Band 4 and some DLC are to be delisted from the console storefronts on October 5, 2025, though can continue to be downloaded and played for those that have already purchased the game.

== Soundtrack ==
Rock Band 4 ships with 65 songs on disc, spanning from the 1960s to the 2010s. The studio also worked to ensure that as much of its existing library of downloadable songs would be compatible with the game upon its release as possible; 1,500 songs were available at launch. (Note: Players in Europe and Oceania on the PlayStation 4 were not able to access existing content on release; see Reception for more details.) Nearly all existing official Rock Band DLC is compatible with Rock Band 4 within the same console family (i.e. PlayStation 4 can only import songs purchased on PlayStation 3, and Xbox One can only import songs purchased on Xbox 360). Previous disc exports from the previous disc-based games in the series (excluding The Beatles: Rock Band), the Track Packs, and from Rock Band Blitz will eventually be available for players, as long as they have previously performed the disc export; there will be no option to export these songs into Rock Band 4. Rock Band 3 on-disc songs are expected to be exportable into Rock Band 4 in December 2015. "If you bought a Rock Band song, it should be yours in Rock Band 4," said Sussman. "Everything that you have already exported will come over." Following transition of all official DLC, Harmonix announced in May 2018 it will also start bringing the most popular and fan-requested entries from the Rock Band Network into Rock Band 4. In most cases, existing songs will be updated to use both Freestyle Guitar and Vocals within Rock Band 4.

Harmonix has resumed releasing DLC since the release of Rock Band 4, generally releasing three to six new songs each week, with DLC not being released during the weeks that a new patch is introduced. From May 2016 to January 2024, Harmonix had generally offered two songs for DLC per week, including new and "Rewind" songs that had been featured on previous Rock Band games.

== Reception ==
Reception

Aggregate scores
Aggregator	Score
GameRankings	(XONE) 79.64% (PS4) 78.47%
Metacritic	(XONE) 79/100 (PS4) 78/100

Review scores
Publication	Score
Destructoid	7/10
Electronic Gaming Monthly	6.5/10
Game Informer	8.75/10
GameRevolution	4/5 stars
GameSpot	7/10
GamesRadar+	5/5 stars
Giant Bomb	3/5 stars
IGN	8.8/10
Polygon	7.5/10

Rock Band 4 received positive reviews from critics, who judged that the game does not significantly deviate from its past, otherwise strong, iterations, but considered the soundtrack to be weaker than previous games. Aggregating review websites GameRankings and Metacritic gave the Xbox One version 79.64% based on 22 reviews and 79/100 based on 27 reviews and the PlayStation 4 version 78.47% based on 31 reviews and 78/100 based on 51 reviews.

IGN praised Rock Band 4 for remaining "every bit the magical cooperative gaming experience the series has always been", with a particular focus on its continuity in gameplay with previous installments, and its "party-friendly" improvements to managing multiplayer play. The Freestyle Solos feature was also praised for allowing players more creative freedom in their performance. The game's on-disc soundtrack was considered "weaker" than previous installments, describing it as primarily featuring "B-list" musicians, lesser-known songs by notable acts (such as Rush) that had not yet been featured in Rock Band, and lacking a number of major acts that had historically made appearances in the franchise. However, it was acknowledged that the game's backward compatibility with songs purchased for previous versions provided a "massive incentive" for players with pre-existing libraries. The Tour mode was praised for its unpredictability and humor, although noting that it was more fun with a larger library of songs beyond those included with the game.

GameSpot noted that the Freestyle Solos "genuinely enhance[d] the core experience", explaining that players "can actually create some really cool sounding stuff. Like, surprisingly cool. And it's weirdly addictive. It's not the same adrenaline-fueled, fist-pumping thrill of nailing every note in a really technical section, but there is an unexpected sense of discovery and reward". Although praising Rock Band 4 for maintaining the "spirit" of prior installments, it was panned for not distinguishing itself enough from them, such as describing the career mode as being an iteration of a structure already used in previous music games (including Rock Band 2). Regressions were also noted, such as a lack of practice modes beyond Freestyle Solo tutorials, the shallowness of character customization, and the removal of online multiplayer. The soundtrack was also described as "underwhelming", albeit acknowledging several "seriously inspired choices", such as the Protomen.

NPD Group reported that Rock Band 4 was the tenth best selling game for October 2015 based on units, while accounting for price, was the fourth best selling game. Analyst Michael Pachter estimated revenue from Rock Band 4 sales were about $100 million in early 2016. Mad Catz, prior to release, had anticipated high sales of Rock Band 4 in part to avoid defaulting to their current debtor; however, sales were lower than expected based on their 2016 Fiscal Year results. Though Rock Band 4 contributed significantly towards sales of controller hardware for Mad Catz, the company found the game's "sell-through was lower than originally forecast resulting in higher inventory balances as well as lower margins due to increased promotional activity with retailers". Alongside reporting of these results, several senior executive members resigned from the company, and the company laid off 37% of its staff as part of a restructuring plan. In their financial earnings report given mid-2016, Mad Catz reported a total loss of more than $11 million, much of it attributed to unsold Rock Band 4 inventory. Harmonix subsequently announced in March 2016 that Mad Catz would be replaced by PDP as the game's publishing and hardware partner. In Mad Catz's 2016 annual financial report, the company said that its partnership with Harmonix for Rock Band 4 had been a "burden" on the company, as though they ultimately sold all stock of their instruments, the revenues were not as great as anticipated.

Shortly following the game's release, it was discovered that some of Harmonix' employees had submitted very positive customers reviews as anonymous users for the game at Amazon.com. Harmonix stated that they amended their employee policy to require them to identify their employment at Harmonix as part of such reviews or to remove them, and stated the posted reviews were "inappropriate actions". Separately, PlayStation 4 users of Rock Band 4 in Europe were unable to download some of their previously purchased DLC from the PlayStation Store, at least four weeks after the game's launch. Mad Catz stated that the issue stemmed from technical and licensing difficulties between the various countries served by the European PlayStation Store. Harmonix affirmed there were issues with more than 400 existing songs due to difficulties with licensing between them and Sony Computer Entertainment Europe but that they expect to have these available by early December 2015. Harmonix was finally able to confirm the licensing problems were resolved by December 2016, and anticipates the missing tracks will be available by May 2017.

During the 19th Annual D.I.C.E. Awards, the Academy of Interactive Arts & Sciences nominated Rock Band 4 for "Family Game of the Year". At the following year's awards ceremony, the Academy of Interactive Arts & Sciences also nominated the expansion Rock Band Rivals for "Family Game of the Year".
