= Rock Band Network =

Former service that allowed user-generated songs to be added to Rock Band video games

- Developer: Harmonix
- Type: Online service
- Launched: March 4, 2010; 16 years ago
- Platforms: Xbox 360; PlayStation 3 Wii
- Status: Discontinued

The Rock Band Network (abbreviated RBN) was a downloadable content service designed by Harmonix with the help of Microsoft to allow musical artists and record labels to make their music available as playable tracks for the Rock Band series of rhythm video games, starting with Rock Band 2 (2008). It was designed to allow more music to be incorporated into Rock Band than Harmonix themselves could produce for the games, and it was seen as a way to further expand the games' music catalog into a wide variety of genres. The Network started closed beta testing in July 2009. The Rock Band Network Store was publicly available on March 4, 2010 for all Xbox 360 players in selected countries (US, Canada, UK, France, Italy, Germany, Spain, Sweden, and Singapore). Rock Band Network songs were exclusive to the Xbox 360 for 30 days on each song's release, after which a selection of songs would be made available on the PlayStation 3.

The Rock Band Network was based on the XNA Creators Club model and uses peer review to check songs for playability, copyright violations and profanity in a song's lyrics. Harmonix had developed a suite of software tools, including a modified version of REAPER, a digital audio sound tool, and Magma, a metadata packaging tool, for use by artists and labels. In addition, Harmonix had helped to spawn the creation of several third-party companies, based on the previous hacking environment for the creation of custom songs, that will author an artist's song into a Rock Band track. Artists retain full control on their songs, and receive 30% of the sales from the Network. Several artists and labels had committed to expanding the distribution of their music through the network. A second version of the Network, "RBN 2.0" went live shortly after the release of Rock Band 3. The new version incorporated the ability to author regular and Pro keyboard, vocal harmonies, and Pro drums; due to the complexity and time investment, RBN 2.0 did not support authoring of Pro guitar or bass. The Network has been considered a more favorable option for the addition of user-generated content for music games than compared to Activision's previous attempt with "GHTunes" for the Guitar Hero series.

Harmonix has since announced that they would be discontinuing regular DLC updates for the Rock Band series as of April 2, 2013; the Network would remain functional for Xbox 360 users while the third-party technologies, such as Microsoft XNA, remain automated processes, while the PlayStation 3 would see no further releases after April 2. The service was fully closed in September 2017 as Harmonix moved forward with other projects, and all of its songs were removed from the DLC store in February 2018. In May 2018, Harmonix announced it would be bringing the most popular entries as well as fan-requested songs from the Network into Rock Band 4; however, unlike core Rock Band DLC, users are unable to carry over any previously purchased Network songs due to licensing constraints.

== Development ==
Prior to the announcement of the Rock Band Network, Harmonix would regularly add approximately 10 songs each week as new downloadable content for the Rock Band games, consistent with their vision of Rock Band as a music platform and preferring digital distribution instead of new games or media. The downloadable content has been well received by players, with over 50 million songs downloaded by mid-2009. However, without significantly expanding their company, Harmonix realized they could not expand their authoring process. The company worked with Microsoft to create the Network, modeling it after their XNA Creators Club which has produced a series of peer-reviewed titles in the Xbox Live Indie Games series. The resulting model allows artists and labels to author their own songs into Rock Band tracks, and submit them for peer-review before adding them to the Network, with a 30% cut of the songs' sales. Eran Egozy, co-founder of Harmonix, noted that "We're changing the way the music industry is working, and we're hoping there's going to be this big community around it". Harmonix' other co-founder, Alex Rigopulos, sees the Network as the next form of media that people will want to experience music through as with portable music players and in concerts. Rigopulos also stated that creating music in a form that is ready to be used in Rock Band is "just part of what they do now", and considers the Network an attractive way to allow artists and labels to skip the Harmonix middleman in getting tracks to players. The New York Times claims that in order to keep the development of the Network confidential, they internally named the project "Rock Band: Nickelback", believing that the "quintessentially generic modern rock group" name would deflect any attention to it. However, Harmonix senior producer Matthew Nordhaus denied this claim.

In anticipation of the announcement of Rock Band Network, Harmonix contacted the ScoreHero and CustomHero communities, groups that have been hacking and modifying songs from Rock Band to put in their own custom songs, in order to engage them in helping use their knowledge of song creation. As a result, a company called Rhythm Authors was created by Joseph Cirri, the founder of ScoreHero; for a portion of the song's sale, they will assist bands by creating the appropriate note tracking for their songs, peer review them, and help to train others to do the tasks. Within a week of the company's reveal, sixteen bands had signed up for Rhythm Authors' services. Other companies, including RockGamers Studios, TuneCore, and WaveGroup Sound, have also been formed for authoring; while authoring rates vary between the companies, it is estimated to be approximately $500 per minute of transcoded song. Harmonix provided training classes on the Rock Band Network tools and promotion at the September 2009 GameSoundCon Conference in Los Angeles. Harmonix' Greg LoPiccolo stated that he believes the authoring community will also come up with further plug-ins for the authoring software to further automate the song creation process. Similar companies that promise to help author note tracks have also been created since the announcement of the Network.

== History ==
The Network started in private Beta in September 2009, A patch to Rock Band 2 for Xbox 360 users posted in late 2009 included the addition of the "Audition" mode that allowed those in the Beta to try their songs in the game. The development tools and additional documentation were released to the general public in early October 2009. Though originally expected that the Network will become available to general players in November 2009, the open service was not expected to launch until early 2010. An open beta, allowing any player with an Xbox 360 and XNA account, was opened on January 19, 2010. The Rock Band Network Store was opened on March 4, 2010, with over 100 songs available at launch. On opening, it was announced that T-Mobile would help sponsor the store, highlighting an "Artist of the Month". Harmonix will continue to author songs for release as normal downloadable content alongside the Network. Further interactions between regular downloadable content and Network songs will depend on the performance of the Network. Harmonix noted that the delays in getting the Network out was due to lack of internal deadlines within Harmonix as well as difficulties adapting the XNA system to their needs. Harmonix also identified issues with the closed beta period, during which they used mock-ups of songs instead of real ones for the beta testers to review, as when real songs were then added, a number of new concerns were suddenly apparent. Harmonix also noted that legal discussions on the addition of user-generated content added several months to the release of the Network.

Limited PlayStation 3 support was announced starting on April 22, 2010. Due to limitations with Sony's store system, Harmonix would initially be able to offer 5 songs weekly, selected based on popularity as well as balance of genre and bands from the exist Network library from the Xbox 360; Harmonix is currently working to expand this number.

The number of songs on the Network surpassed 400 in May 2010, and 500 in August 2010, leading to an average release of 3 songs per day since the launch of the Network. More than 9000 users have participated in helping on supporting the Network review process with over 700 of those as track authors or playtesters. Approximately half of the tracks played in the Network's demo mode are subsequently bought by the players, representing an "organic growth" of the service, according to Harmonix' Jeff Marshall.

Songs from the Network will continue to work in Rock Band 3, and will be treated as regular downloadable content across all modes of the game. Rock Band Network 2.0 was announced upon release of Rock Band 3, with a testing cycle starting shortly afterwards. The second version of the network includes support for new features of Rock Band 3, including vocal harmonies, keyboard support, and Pro modes for drums and keyboard. However, it will not include Pro guitar or bass modes initially; this decision was based on the difficulty of authoring the Pro guitar tracks and the expected limited user base available to test these songs on the onset of Rock Band 3's release. Harmonix will review the demand for such features within a year to consider adding this functionality to RBN 2.0. Other changes include improved authoring tools for creators, and better control of audition sessions for reviewers to better evaluate a song. Beta versions of the tools were live shortly after Rock Band 3's release. The Network 2.0 is scheduled to go live on February 15, 2011, with existing Network shut down the day before. After this event, only players with Rock Band 3 will see new songs available through the Rock Band Network; players of Rock Band 2 will still be able to purchases older songs approved for release before the change.

On September 3, 2010, Harmonix announced the first nine Rock Band Network tracks for the Wii, but gave no release date, simply stating they were "coming soon". The first tracks for Wii were released on September 7, 2010. Due to limited demand for Network songs on Wii platform, Harmonix discontinued further Network tracks for the Wii on January 18, 2011.

== Authoring process ==
To create custom songs for Rock Band, authors of the Rock Band Network use REAPER to analyze their song and place appropriate note markers for all instruments in time with their music.

To participate in the Network, artists must purchase an XNA Creators Club license for the charting tools. A copy of the digital audio workstation software REAPER, using custom add-ons created by Harmonix, is the key program that artists and track creators will use to author tracks; the program allows the author to analyze the tempo of the track, and then place notes in time with the music for each supported game difficulty. It also has the ability to auto-generate the song's note tracking for kick and snare drums at the "Expert" difficulty, though creators must further tune the resulting note track, and create easy, medium, and hard difficulty gameplay. Following this, Harmonix' "Magma" program, so named jokingly as magma is the source of "rock", is used to convert the song and note track information into a Rock Band playable song, and attempts to create reasonable animation sequences based on this information, such as having the camera focus on the guitarist during a solo. These animations can be further customized by the editor within REAPER. Only two aspects of the performance cannot be modified by the editor: they cannot change the lip-synching of the vocalists, and they cannot control the activation of the fog machine peripheral for the game. Authors are not required to use REAPER; Magma requires a MIDI file that meets documented specifications, allowing users to use other authoring programs if they wanted to.

The authoring of a single track is expected to take between 20 and 40 hours for a newcomer to the process, according to Harmonix. All tracks will be submitted to review through a standard peer review process to judge song difficulty and gameplay standards while patrolling submissions for copyright violations and profanity. Songs can be priced from $1 to 3 dollars, with the artists receiving 30% of the track's sales. The Network will only support creators that reside in the United States with content distributed to the United States, Canada, and Europe, due to current restrictions on the XNA Creator's Club and user-generated content.

In an interview at the 2010 Game Developers Conference held a few weeks after the Network's launch, Harmonix's senior producer Matthew Nordhaus and senior sound designer Caleb Epps noted that the user community has been critical for helping to identify some of the authoring and playtesting limitations. Though the lip synching animations are generated by REAPER and Magma automatically, they would produce awkward animations on long sustained vocal notes, but the user community found tricks to get around that. Users also helped to identify areas of the authoring process which Harmonix had taken for granted due to three years of past authoring experience, such as advice on the appropriate mixing of audio for tracks. They also found the community was supportive of allowing creative mixes for a song that would otherwise not be in Rock Band, such as using the vocal part of a track to match to the melody of a saxophone for a jazz piece. However, Nordhaus and Epps noted that users have also found ways to bypass some of the content-restrictions on the authoring process, such as the generation of images of swastikas or male genitalia within the note-tracks themselves, and there is reliance on the community to catch and remove these before release. In part, both the use of XNA and the requirement for users to pay to participate, act as a barrier to interference by users who are simply wasting the community's resources.

Artists must have publishing rights for songs they release through the Rock Band Network, thus limiting the use of covers or remixes. However, Harmonix only seeks to gain non-exclusive licenses for songs, allowing artists to also have their songs used in other rhythm games. Artists will be able to remove songs from the Network if they want.

Through a title patch for the game by November 2009, Xbox 360 Rock Band 2 users will be able to browse songs in the Rock Band Network through several different categories; furthermore, a demonstration of each Network song, consisting of either one minute or 35% of the track's total length, whichever is shorter, can be played in Quickplay mode, with the user given the option to immediately purchase the song after playing it. While Harmonix has not ported the tools to work with the PlayStation 3, artists that create Network songs need only "to do some paperwork" to allow the songs to be ported to the PlayStation Network; a similar title patch occurred for Rock Band 2 on that system. The Wii does not allow title patches, and as such, Network songs will only be offered if placed onto the Wii's store by Harmonix. Along with the Rock Band Network on the consoles, users can browse the available songs, with web pages and previews for individual songs automatically generated by Harmonix' software through the Rock Band website. While the initial version of the web site will allow for simple search, they plan to expand its capabilities to include song recommendations and other finer search tools for end users. Harmonix will also help to promote certain songs and will include features such as song or label of the week, though details of how this promotion may affect the artist's revenue is unknown.

Once players have purchased and downloaded Rock Band Network tracks, there are limitations to where the song can be used. Network songs will not appear as a song within the various "Mystery Setlist" challenges within Tour mode, though users can add Network songs to "Make a Setlist". Users can also use Network songs in Quickplay modes. Network songs cannot be played in the head-to-head modes, as this would require Network authors to also balance note tracks for these game modes. Songs can be practiced through Practice Mode, but unlike Harmonix-authored songs, which include hooks to allow the user to practice specific sections of a song, Network songs are not authored with these phrase hooks and can only be practiced in 10% segments.

== Confirmed artists and labels ==
Several bands, including the Harmonix in-house band, have already committed to providing songs for the Network. Jonathan Coulton, who appeared on a panel about the Rock Band Network at the 2009 Penny Arcade Expo demonstrating the authoring process for his song "The Future Soon", has committed to providing additional songs through it. Boston independent band the Bon Savants created a series of blog video posts demonstrating and explaining the steps in authoring a song into the Network. Further bands confirmed by Harmonix include The Shins, Ministry, Evanescence, The Stills, Creed, and All That Remains. WaveGroup Sound also confirmed that they will be releasing several songs from artists such as Reverend Horton Heat, Steve Vai and Widespread Panic. Umphrey's McGee has also announced plans for several songs on the Rock Band Network including the tracks "1348" and "Miss Tinkles Overture". Rapper Teflon Don is an added addition to give the Urban Rap/R&B feel to the platform.

Harmonix has also been in contact with major music labels who previously have been requesting Harmonix to include their music to participate in creating songs with the Network. One label, Sub Pop, has revealed they will plan to release all songs and albums on their label to the Rock Band Network, including early music by Nirvana, Mudhoney, Sleater-Kinney, The Postal Service and The Shins, though the amount and rate of content will be affected by the difficulty of the tools Harmonix will provide to make the music tracks. For the service's launch, the label prepared 25 songs through the various authoring companies. Tony Kiewel of Sub Pop stated that they see the Rock Band Network as another music distribution path alongside vinyl and CD and plan to release future songs from their label on the Network alongside traditional music media. One such band includes Flight of the Conchords, who announced that three of their songs, including two from their first album, would be coming to Rock Band at the 61st Primetime Emmy Awards, later clarified by Sub Pop that they would be Network tracks. Label Side One Dummy announced that they will be releasing The '59 Sound and Old White Lincoln, the two first singles from The Gaslight Anthem's The '59 Sound album in early March 2010. On April 30, 2010, Rhythm Authors announced that they were partnered with Sumerian Records to bring the label's music to the Rock Band Network; so far Asking Alexandria, Veil of Maya and After the Burial are confirmed to be in production.

The Rock Band Network has also been used to promote songs from video games or other sources. Two songs from the fictional rock group, the Midnight Riders, from Left 4 Dead 2 have been added through the network. At least two songs created for the television show Lost will be appearing on the network, in part due to fans of the show at Harmonix working with the Lost team to create the works.

On January 4, 2011, rock band Alien Ant Farm confirmed that several of their songs, including the entirety of debut album ANThology, would be making their way to the Rock Band Network in 2011. The first three songs have been announced, with an aim to release three more songs quarterly until the album is complete.

Devin Townsend has been confirmed to be adding the entirety of his Ziltoid the Omniscient album to the Rock Band Network over the course of 2011.
