= Rock Band Blitz =

2012 video game

- Developer: Harmonix
- Publisher: Harmonix
- Series: Rock Band
- Platforms: PlayStation 3 (PlayStation Network), Xbox 360 (Xbox Live Arcade)
- Release: PlayStation 3: WW: August 28, 2012; Xbox 360: WW: August 29, 2012
- Genre: Rhythm
- Mode: Single-player

Rock Band Blitz is a 2012 rhythm game developed and published by Harmonix. It is the eighth console installment in the Rock Band series. The game was released as a downloadable game for PlayStation Network and Xbox Live Arcade in August 2012. Unlike previous iterations of Rock Band, Blitz was not sold with any special instrument controllers, and was designed to use regular console controllers to match notes in a song, using gameplay mechanics similar to Harmonix' previous titles Frequency (2001), Amplitude (2003), and Rock Band Unplugged (2009). In addition to the 25 songs shipped with the game, the title was capable of using any songs the player has downloaded or exported for Rock Band 3 (2010).

Due to music license expirations, the game was delisted from the PlayStation Network and Xbox Live storefronts on August 28, 2017.

== Gameplay ==
Rock Band Blitz is similar to Harmonix' previous titles, Frequency and Amplitude, requiring note matching for each of the instrument tracks provided.

Rock Band Blitz is a note-matching rhythm game fashioned similarly to Harmonix' previous titles, Frequency, Amplitude, and Rock Band Unplugged. The game presents up to five instrument lanes to the player corresponding to lead guitar, bass guitar, drums, vocals, and keyboard that run through the streets of the fictional "Rock City"; if a song does not include tracks for one or more of these instruments, they are not shown on the field. Each lane consists of a number of markers on the two sides of the lane, representing the notes played by that instrument in the song. Unlike other Rock Band games, there is only a single difficulty level.

Using a standard game console controller with customizable controls, the player uses the buttons to match these notes on one track at a time, scoring points for each successful note hit. Each note in a lane hit correctly will lead towards building the lane's specific scoring modifier, starting from 1x, up to a set level cap, initially 4x. Songs are broken down into sections with checkpoints; at these points, the game will increase the level cap up to 3x higher than the current lowest lane multiplier. For example, if the player reaches a checkpoint with four lanes at 8x and one lane at 6x, the multiplier cap will be raised 3x higher than the 6x, to 9x. Thus, the player is encouraged to play notes on all lanes to reach the current level cap across all lanes, as to reach higher scoring modifiers. When songs feature guitar, bass, drum, or keyboard solos, only that lane will show notes; at the following checkpoint, all lane multipliers will be increased based on the performance during the solo. If a lane does not have a significant number of notes between checkpoints, it automatically increased at these checkpoints. Playing series of notes consecutively will build a "Blitz" meter. When full, the player will move faster along the tracks until they miss a small number of notes, while gaining an additional scoring bonus. Upon completing a song, the player is rated on a 1 to 5-star system based on their total score, including 5 gold stars for very high scores, and is given a reward of both "cred", used to unlock power-ups (as described below), and coins which are used to buy the use of power-ups for a song. Cred is also awarded on a per-track and song genre-basis, and used for tracking the player's long-term performance.

The player can gain access to three different types of power-ups as they earn "cred". Overdrive power-ups are engaged in the same manner as the Overdrive system of the previous Rock Band games. Certain sections of lanes will be marked with a series of white notes. Hitting these white notes will fill an Overdrive meter. Once passed a minimum amount of Overdrive, the player can then activate this powerup. Overdrive powerups include a 2x scoring multiplier, the ability to have the computer play one track for a period of time, and others that involve launching a bottle rocket, sending out a shock wave, or launching an out-of-control car down the track, scoring points for each note hit. The second type of power-up are note-based ones. Certain notes on the tracks will be marked in purple; successfully hitting these notes will engage the power-up's effects. These include notes that will "blow up" all notes on nearby tracks for points, one that creates a pinball that scores points for each note hit while the player keeps it in play, and a sprite that randomly moves between tracks that the player must try to catch up to earn points. Finally, track-based power-ups either are active on specific tracks of a song doubling the point value of notes hit on that track at any time, or activated when switching tracks at specific markers. At the start of a song, the player can use coins to buy the use of one of each power-up for that songs, or can opt not to use one or more power-ups.

Players' performances are tracked through online scoreboards which can be accessed in-game or through the Rock Band World Facebook application. Through these, players can compete with friends and issue challenges on specific songs, as well as receive recommendations of other downloadable songs they may want to purchase based on their song choices. The player can earn additional coins in-game by completing challenges given through Rock Band World. As the player progresses on a song, they will be informed of how their progress is comparing to that of their friends from their friends list.

== Development ==
Project director Matthew Nordhaus stated that the game is a departure from the past Rock Band titles, "instead of having the focus on musical authenticity, and performance simulation, it's an arcade game", and thus at times may be "fast, and loud and silly and a little over the top". The game is based on a prototype that Harmonix was working on around the time that Viacom sold the company in 2010, and recently revived by the company. The initial running title for the game was Synchrony before its change to Rock Band Blitz, though the name remains as one of the game's powerups. They had experimented with various mechanics, such as having three possible notes per lane, or using different mechanics on each instrument lane, such as making the drum lane more complicated or using analog controls to follow the pitch on vocal tracks, but fell back to having two notes per lanes as it would make it very easy for the player to assess what notes were coming up and make quick decisions on what track to jump to next. One difficulty Harmonix found through playtesting was that players would be tempted to try to clear every note, a requirement to be successful in other Rock Band titles, but here had built an "open-ended" game where players could play on any track they wanted at any time. To counter this, the team is including loading screen tips and tutorials to allow players to explore the open-ended nature of the game.

Harmonix had considered including gameplay that included the instrument controllers but found no easy way to include them into the title. They recognized that the game would be strictly limited to a single-player mode, but sought means to bring in social elements to simulate the experience of playing and challenging others. The launch of Blitz was tied with the launch of the Rock Band World Facebook application allowing players to tie their console accounts to the app. The app allow players to compare performances in both Rock Band 3 and Rock Band Blitz with friends and global scoreboards, work towards additional goals provided by the application, and participate in weekly challenges set by Harmonix.

The game itself performs the conversion of the standard Rock Band tracks into the note paths for Rock Band Blitz, internally described as "Blitzification". As of its announcement, Nordhaus said that Harmonix was still fine-tuning some of these conversion aspects, such as how to handle the vocal components. Their aim was still to retain the beat and feel of the song through the reduced note tracks. The conversion process is able to use lighting and presentation cues that are already built into the tracks for Rock Band 3 and use them to describe the look and feel of the city as the player progresses through a song.

Though the game's formal announcement was tied to its premiere at the 2012 Penny Arcade Expo East convention, the game was shown to members of the press during the 2012 Game Developers Conference.

Harmonix announced that they would be delisting Blitz from the PSN and Xbox Live storefronts in August 2017 due to the expiration of music licensing agreements, and do not have plans to make the game backwards compatible on the newer consoles. Those that have purchased the game prior its delisting will still be able to download and play it, as well as export the songs into Rock Band 4.

== Soundtrack ==
The game features 25 songs: 23 songs are new to the series while 2 songs, "Give It Away" by the Red Hot Chili Peppers and "Spoonman" by Soundgarden, were previously released in Rock Band 2 but were not exportable to Rock Band 3. In addition, the game works with all of the songs the player has previously downloaded for Rock Band 3, including those from the Rock Band Network, as well as the previous Rock Band games. The 25 songs included with the game are immediately playable in Rock Band 3 as well. All future downloadable content for Rock Band 3 also works with Rock Band Blitz. Upon initial release, the songs in the Blitz soundtrack were exclusive to the game; however, from December 18, 2012, and continuing through March 19, 2013, Harmonix has been releasing songs from Blitz as singles for Rock Band 3 for Wii players, where Blitz was not available, and for those players that only wanted selected tracks from the list. Six of the songs are offered with Pro Guitar/Bass upgrades within Rock Band 3 and are available for those who purchased the songs as singles as well as those who exported the Blitz soundtrack.

Song title	Artist	Year	Genre	Pro guitar/bass support in RB3
"A Little Less Sixteen Candles, a Little More "Touch Me""	Fall Out Boy	2005	Pop/Rock	No
"Always"	Blink-182	2003	Punk	No
"Bang Your Head (Metal Health)"	Quiet Riot	1983	Metal	No
"Cult of Personality"	Living Colour	1988	Rock	Yes
"Death on Two Legs (Dedicated To...)"	Queen	1975	Classic Rock	No
"Diamond Eyes (Boom-Lay Boom-Lay Boom)"	Shinedown	2010	Nu Metal	No
"Give It Away"	Red Hot Chili Peppers	1991	Alternative	Yes
"I'm Still Standing"	Elton John	1983	Classic Rock	No
"Jessie's Girl"	Rick Springfield	1981	Classic Rock	Yes
"Jungle Boogie"	Kool & the Gang	1973	R&B/Soul/Funk	Yes
"Kids in the Street"	All-American Rejects	2012	Emo	No
"Moves Like Jagger"	Maroon 5 feat. Christina Aguilera	2011	Pop/Rock	No
"Once Bitten, Twice Shy"	Great White	1989	Rock	No
"One Week"	Barenaked Ladies	1998	Rock	No
"Pumped Up Kicks"	Foster the People	2011	Indie Rock	No
"Raise Your Glass"	P!nk	2010	Pop/Rock	No
"Shine"	Collective Soul	1994	Rock	No
"Shout"	Tears for Fears	1985	New Wave	No
"Sing"	My Chemical Romance	2010	Emo	No
"So Far Away"	Avenged Sevenfold	2010	Metal	No
"Spoonman"	Soundgarden	1994	Grunge	Yes
"Stronger (What Doesn't Kill You)"	Kelly Clarkson	2011	Pop/Rock	No
"These Days"	Foo Fighters	2011	Alternative	No
"We Are Young"	fun. feat. Janelle Monáe	2012	Indie Rock	No
"The Wicker Man"	Iron Maiden	2000	Metal	Yes

== Reception ==
Reception

Aggregate scores
Aggregator	Score
GameRankings	76.9%
Metacritic	77/100

Review scores
Publication	Score
Electronic Gaming Monthly	6/10
Eurogamer	7/10
Game Informer	8/10
GameTrailers	7.2/10
Giant Bomb	4/5
IGN	8.5/10

Rock Band Blitz has received generally positive reviews, comparing the game to Harmonix' earlier Frequency and Amplitude, with many pointing out that the enjoyment of the game is directly tied to the number of previous Rock Band tracks the player can access within Blitz. IGN's Greg Miller gave the game a score of 8.5 and an Editor's Choice award, praising its core gameplay and competitive leaderboards, whilst criticising a lack of a draw for solo players not into high scores. Ryan Davis of Giant Bomb considered that while the game's social hooks could have been better implemented, players with a large library of existing Rock Band tracks would readily enjoy the title. Matt Miller of Game Informer found the arcade-style of play to be fun, but hampered by the constant need to collect coins to use power-ups and at times the need to grind for coins.

GameTrailers gave the game a score of 7.2, saying the focus on scores and track switching "takes away the very soul of Rock Band". Eurogamer's Dan Whitehead echoed this, noting that the constant drive to find high-scoring opportunities "means waving goodbye to that amazing synaesthetic feeling you get with a guitar in hand, where you inhabit a song, feeling the music and seeing the shape of it as the notes tumble towards you; hands, ears and eyes in perfect coordination". Roger Hargreaves of the Metro rated the game a 6 out of 10, noting that the as-shipped music library is rather small and the game's continuous push on the user to buy more content. Electronic Games Monthly' McKinley Noble was also critical of the constant push for players to buy content, and felt that the title "would be a better game with a higher price tag and a bigger built-in song list" instead of relying on DLC.

XBLAFans reported that Rock Band Blitz dominated September 2012 XBLA sales achieving 116,426 sales between August 27 and September 30.
