= Rock Band 3 =

2010 music video game

- Developer: Harmonix (Note: DS and Wii version developed by Backbone Entertainment)
- Publisher: Harmonix (Note: Originally published by MTV Games in 2010, Mad Catz took over with Harmonix doing the publication and distribution of the game from 2011 until 2015.)
- Directors: Daniel Sussman; Josh Randall
- Producers: Michael Verrette; Robert W. Lindsley
- Designers: Dan Teasdale; Sylvain Dubrofsky; Brian Chan
- Programmers: Avida Michaud; Eric Malafew
- Artists: Peter A. MacDonald; Ryan Lesser
- Writer: Helen McWilliams
- Series: Rock Band
- Platforms: Nintendo DS; PlayStation 3; Xbox 360; Wii
- Release: NA: October 26, 2010; AU: October 28, 2010; EU: October 29, 2010
- Genre: Rhythm
- Modes: Single-player, multiplayer

Rock Band 3 is a 2010 rhythm game developed by Harmonix. The game was initially published and distributed by MTV Games and Electronic Arts, respectively, on October 26, 2010. Mad Catz took over both roles and re-released the title on November 23, 2011. It is the third main installment and the seventh console release in the Rock Band series. As with the previous titles, Rock Band 3 allows players to simulate the playing of rock music and many other subgenres using special instrument controllers mimicking lead and bass guitar, keyboard, drums, and vocals. Rock Band 3 expands upon previous games by including three-part vocal harmonies — previously used in The Beatles: Rock Band and Green Day: Rock Band (up to 3 singers on a song) — plus support for MIDI-compatible keyboards, electronic drumkits, and even use of a real guitar in "Pro" mode.

Distinguishing it from all previous rhythm music games, Rock Band 3 features "Pro" mode, which is designed to accurately mimic playing of real instruments. In Pro mode, real guitar and bass players have to match specific fingering on frets and strings, drummers have to strike cymbal pads in addition to snare and toms, and keyboardists have to use precise fingering across the whole keyboard. Mad Catz manufactured a 102-button controller with 6 strings meant for bass and for lead guitar Fender lent a real Fender Squier stringed guitar modified with built-in electronics and enhancements to support Pro mode. Real instruments and original Basic controllers can be played simultaneously in various combinations within the game to simulate playing in a real band. Before a song starts, the players choose which instrument they will represent within the song. If the right note is hit or played, it is heard in the audio. If notes are missed, they are not heard.

The game includes a list of 83 songs, fully upgraded to Pro — many emphasize the keyboard instrument. Existing game content, including prior downloadable content and songs from the Rock Band Network, carry forward into the game, with the full Rock Band library reaching 2,000 songs at the time of game launch (surpassing 4,000 songs by the end of October 2012, almost a year after its re-release). Rock Band 3 is designed as a platform to take advantage of players' existing libraries by providing user-created set lists and challenges and tools to easily search and select songs from the library.

Rock Band 3 was initially released worldwide during the last week of October 2010 for the Xbox 360, PlayStation 3, Wii and Nintendo DS. The game received universal acclaim from critics, with praise for the addition of keyboards that broadens the potential music library for the series and the revamped career structure to keep players invested in the title. The game's Pro mode was particularly highlighted by reviewers, who stated that the mode brings the rhythm game genre to the point of teaching players to learn real instruments and have fun doing so by disguising practice into gameplay. Rock Band 3 is cited by some to be one of the greatest games of all time while also considered a pinnacle of the genre. It was also the last Rock Band game to be distributed by Electronic Arts as Mad Catz signed on to produce future Rock Band games.

== Gameplay ==
Rock Band 3 allows for 1–7 players, either locally or through online game services, to use various instrument controllers to accurately simulate the playing of music. In addition to supporting the four Basic instrument controllers from previous Rock Band games (lead guitar, bass guitar, drums and vocals), Rock Band 3 adds support for two additional microphones for singers to provide backup vocal harmonies (previously found in The Beatles: Rock Band and Green Day: Rock Band), an electric keyboard as a new instrument (or any MIDI-compatible keyboard), plus support for a specially made 102-button MIDI bass, and an actual Squier guitar by Fender. Support for MIDI compatible electronic drum kits as well.

Prior to a song, each band member selects from one of four difficulty levels, Easy, Medium, Hard, and Expert, which influence the number and rate that notes appear on the note track; they also can select the Pro mode for real guitar, bass, keyboards, and drums. As the band performs, they score points. Each player can build up a multiplier by hitting consecutive notes correctly, which increases how many points each note is worth, but the multiplier is set back to 1× if a note is missed. After successfully completing a song, the performance of each player and the band as a whole is rated on a 5-star scale. The best performance by a player for each song in the player's library is tracked separately based on instrument, Basic or Pro mode, and difficulty, then is used to provide and compare leaderboard statistics at the end of the song.

The overall goal of the band is to successfully complete a song and earn as many points as possible by using their selected controllers to play the notes shown on the screen at the proper time; or, in the case of the vocalists, to sing in relative pitch to the original artist. Players can also gain additional points by using "Overdrive". Once a player has enough energy, which is collected by perfectly playing marked sections of the song, he or she can activate Overdrive to double the number of points the whole band earns while it is deployed. Each instrument deploys overdrive differently, and some instruments have multiple methods of activating it.

In point competitive mode (without the "no-fail" option on — not recommended for Pro mode), players who are doing poorly might be forced to drop out of the band, which silences their part temporarily while the rest of the players continue to play. A dropped player can be saved up to two times by another player activating Overdrive; if the player is not saved soon enough, the whole band may fail the song and need to restart or exit to the song library. In some game modes, an option is also available to continue the song right from where the band failed at the cost of not being able to record a score for the rest of the song's playthrough.

Although Rock Band 3's gameplay in Basic mode is very similar to that of previous games in the series, it does introduce a new gameplay mechanic designed to make fast sections such as trills, tremolo picking, and drum rolls easier to play. In such sections, players are rewarded for being exactly on cue, but they are not penalized for small differences.

=== Song library and game modes ===
Road Challenges provide new ways for Rock Band 3 players to interact with their library, providing numerous tour options and performance challenges. These provide "spades" in addition to stars for good performances, and individual performances are tracked during a song to provide additional feedback to players. Along the bottom are individual menus that are part of the game's new "overshell" that allow a player to change settings without affecting the other players.

Players have better tools to sort through songs to help manage a song library that was expected to be larger than 2,000 songs after the game's release by the end of 2010. Necessary sorting options include filters based on Pro mode support, keyboard or vocal harmony support, variable difficulty settings, music genre, decade, numbers of times played, leaderboard positions, and when the player acquired the song; any numbers of these filters can be applied to fine-tune the sort, such as selecting all "moderate-difficulty metal songs from the '80s that support keys and harmony vocals". Players are able to rate songs from 1 to 5 "lighters" and use this as a sorting metric. The rating system also allows Harmonix to suggest new songs to players in the Rock Band store. Players are also able to create, save, name, and design art for custom set lists which they can share through the game's online services or through the Rock Band website. The "Battle of the Bands" mode featured in Rock Band 2, in which Harmonix created daily and weekly themed challenges based on the library of songs, extends into Rock Band 3, but allows players to create the challenges themselves from within the game or the website, including the type of challenges, what instrument(s) it is aimed for, and how long to allow the battle to run, then advertise them through social media services like Twitter and Facebook. Harmonix also creates custom setlists and battles. The official Rock Band website was updated to reflect these new features, as well as allowing players to track their own bands or friends' bands.

The game features a more in-depth career mode; players are able to design more detailed characters, which appear nearly at all points alongside the narrative, making the game "one story of your band", according to Harmonix senior designer Dan Teasdale. The career mode includes over 700 career goals, similar to Xbox 360 Achievements or PlayStation 3 Trophies, which helps to drive players to progress in the game. "Road challenges" combine features of the Tour mode of Rock Band and Rock Band 2 with Mario Party concepts, according to Teasdale, and is based on feedback from Rock Band players. For example, the band may be challenged to re-invigorate the virtual crowd using copious amounts of Overdrive after they were disappointed by an opening act, or in another challenge, the band will be required to play as accurately as possible for a crowd of critics. Numerous versions of these challenges are available, that vary in the amount of time to complete (from 30 minutes to 3 hours) and difficulty. Some of these challenges feature multiple gigs; after playing through one gig, the band is presented with three choices for songs to play at the next gig, either from pre-made set lists, customized set lists, or random selection from all available songs. With each song completed within a challenge, the players earn spades; one spade for each star based on the overall scoring, and additional spades for meeting the challenge goals. These challenges are tracks on the scoring leaderboards for the game.

The playing modes are wrapped in an "overshell", which allow players to sign in or out of game console profiles, manage players in the band, and jump in or out of the game with any available instrument at any point, including while playing a song. Players also will have the ability to pause the game and make changes in difficulty; when leaving the pause menu, the song rewinds a few seconds to allow all players to synchronize before the scoring restarts. Due to the limitations in the number of local players on this generation of consoles, only four of the five parts (lead and bass guitar, drums, harmonized vocals, and keyboards) can be played in online and local career and competitive modes. The game attempts to provide the option of a local "All Instruments" quick play mode where all five parts are used allowing the full seven-member band to play; to side step system limitations the vocals are not assigned to a console player but instead are based on the input, if present, from Wireless USB-connected microphones, and the vocal results are not scored along with the other playing members.

=== Custom character support ===
"Rock Band" includes support for using pre-made and custom avatars to represent band members on stage during performances, as in previous Rock Band games. These avatars can include a variety of clothing styles, hair styles, accessories, makeup, and instruments to allow users to customize their performance. While custom characters have been a part of the Rock Band series from the start, Harmonix wants players to feel more connected with their characters and band within Rock Band 3. Harmonix' Chris Foster stated that they realized the game is wish-fulfillment for most players in taking one's band through the rise of success, and structured a weak, non-presuming narrative to help guide this without forcing any particular aspect of the band's story. One aspect to connecting the player to their band was to constantly show the characters throughout all parts of the game screens, such as on the main menus, during song selection and loading screens, and during practice mode. Another approach was to allow more detailed customization tools to encourage the player to create themselves or other characters as they wanted in the game. They wanted to advance the looks of the avatar characters, making them like living dolls with near-realistic features but highly idealized visual elements, such as smooth skin and hair. This was achieved through the use of improved shaders that gave the appearance of realistic surfaces but with the Rock Band stylized art aesthetic. The team aimed to provide something that was in between the complex creation tool for Mass Effect and the simple set of tools for Miis. Rock Band 3 custom character creator allows for more direct customization of the character's facial looks, using a combination of pre-made face styles (including those already from Rock Band 2), facial components such as noses or chins, and adjustment sliders to change size, position, and other details. Numerous additional hair styles are available in addition to the existing elaborate and showy styles from the previous game. Additional controls can be used to further adjust the tone of the character's body, and players are able to apply tattoos across most anywhere on the character's body. Players can then get clothing and instruments in the various in-game shops, with items becoming unlocked as the player progresses through the game. In addition, premium T-shirts with real-life bands are being sold as downloadable content for the players' created characters.

=== Pro mode ===
Rock Band 3 is unique in that it added support for a 25-key keyboard (left track), MIDI compatible real guitars and electronic drum kits in addition to Basic guitar, bass, drums, and vocals from previous rhythm games. Pro mode challenges lead and bass guitarists, keyboardists, and drummers with a realistic playing experience in-game, such as requiring keyboardists to use a full range of keys, drummers (center) to strike proper cymbals as noted by round gems, or guitarists (right) and bassists to use accurate fingering on the fret bar. This screenshot shows Spacehog's "In the Meantime".

Rock Band 3 is the first game in the Rock Band series (or any previous rhythm game) to include "Pro" mode, which can be used simultaneously in conjunction with "Basic" mode (which has been standard in every game in the series). Pro mode is based on the individual player's instrument – so those playing real instruments can play alongside or with those playing Basic controllers – locally, or online.

Pro mode requires the player to learn the actual instrument in some capacity and play the songs note-for-note. Pro mode players may select difficulty levels for their instrument; one can play Pro mode on the "Easy" difficulty level, which reduces the number of notes to hit, but still would require proper fingering or hitting the correct cymbal. The progression of difficulties in Pro mode is aimed to help the player familiar with Basic 5-button controllers to become familiar with and more easily adjust to Pro playing style. On Easy Pro guitar, for example, the player may only be required to finger single notes, while Medium introduces chords. Pro mode is available across all RB3 game modes, and can be selected at the same time as difficulty. Pro players play alongside Basic players in all game modes.

To further help players with the Pro mode, extensive trainers are included in the game. The trainers were developed with the Berklee College of Music to help ease current players into a realistic playing experience. The trainer mode uses music specially created by Harmonix artists with the intent to help players become comfortable with their instruments over a series of lessons. Or, the player can skip the trainers and go straight to figuring out a song from the Music Library. (According to Harmonix's Dan Sussman, there were about 60 to 80 songs specifically made for the trainer section, and they were only available for that mode; but Harmonix placed some of the full songs onto the Rock Band Network at a later date.)

Players are able to slow down a song in Practice Mode as well. Practice Mode also allows choosing a song from the player's Music Library for the purpose of selecting specific sections of a song to focus on, such as a guitar solo, or bridge section. The selected sections can then be made to loop in order to help refine the player's handling of a particular part of a song which they might be having trouble handling note-for-note. There is also a free-form play for pro drums where a drummer can play whatever they wish and utilize effects to change the sound of the drum set.

==== Guitar and bass ====
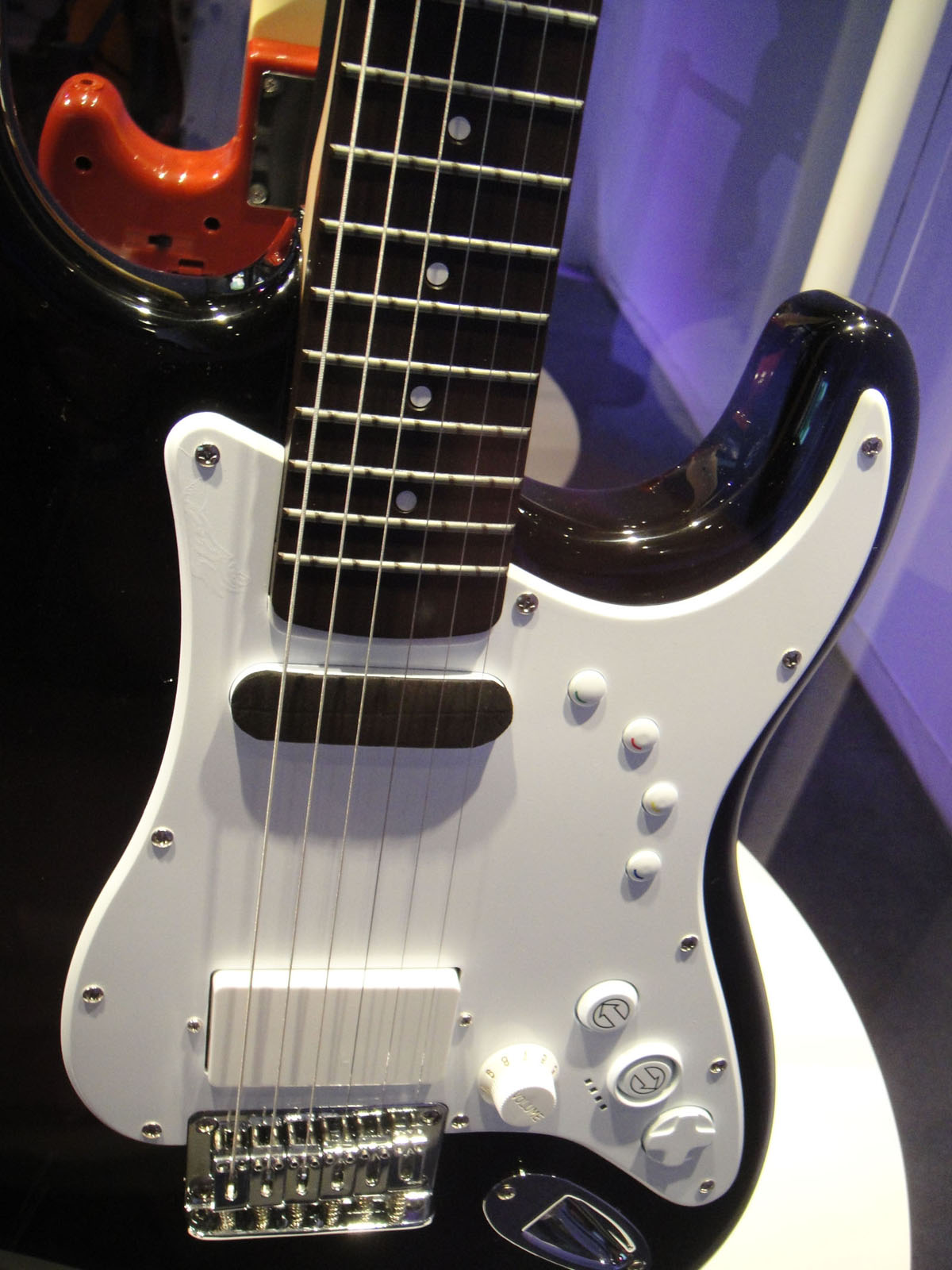
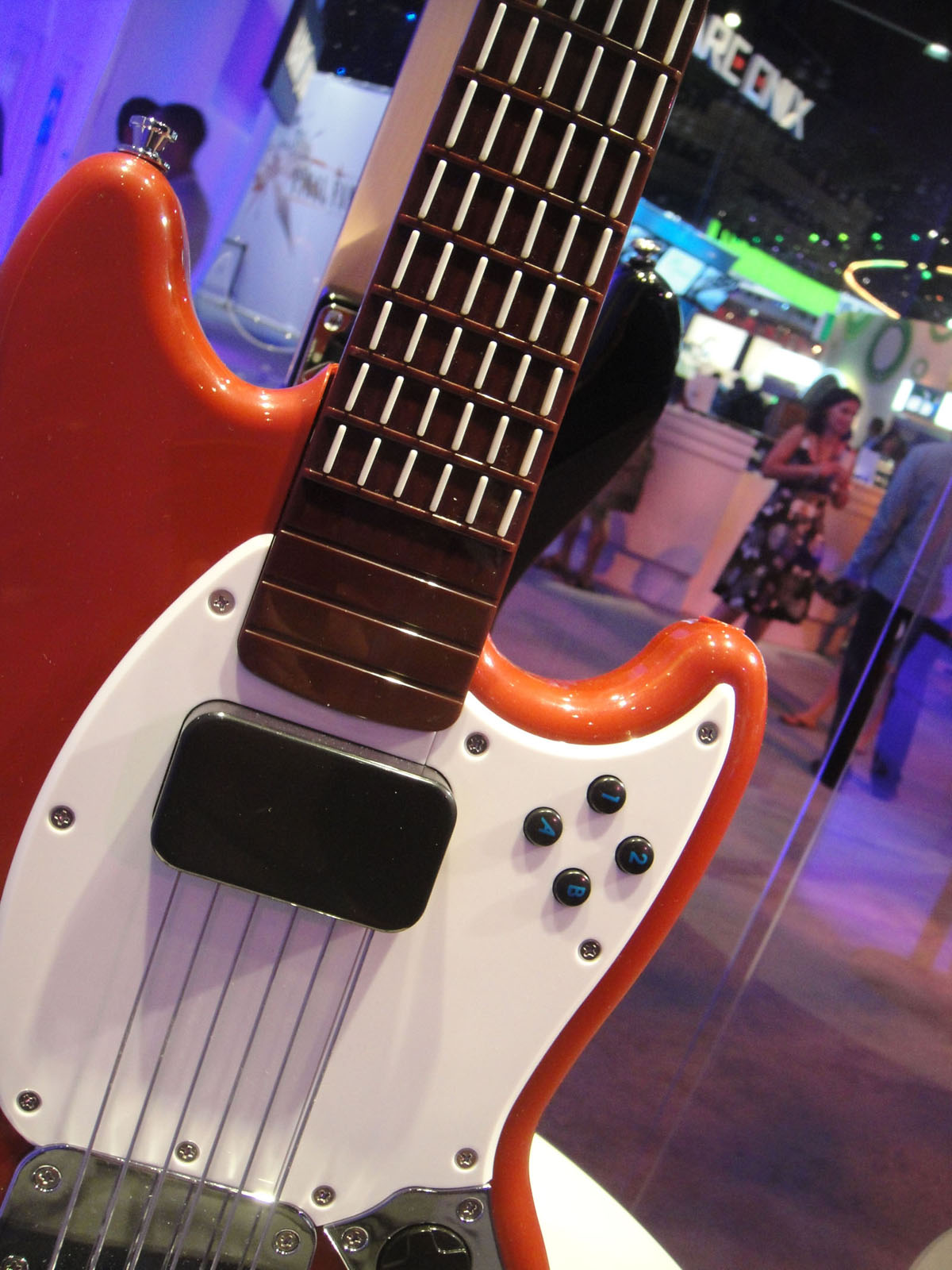
Two official guitar controllers work with Rock Band 3's Pro mode. One (left) is the stringed Fender Squier Stratocaster, while the other (right) is the Fender Mustang (modeled after the actual guitar), which has 102 buttons to simulate frets and 6 strings on the body of the guitar for strumming.

(Existing "5 button" guitar controllers from previous Rock Band and other compatible games (such as Guitar Hero) can still be used interchangeably with real Pro instruments for non-Pro parts in Rock Band 3, but not vice versa.)

Both the Fender Mustang Pro-Guitar MIDI 102-button/string controller and the Fender Squier Stratocaster 6-string guitar and MIDI controller have "fret sensing" ability, in order to display fingering on specific frets to the video display for instant feedback on where the player's fingers are on the fret board at any time.

Mad Catz based the Fender Mustang Pro-Guitar MIDI 102-button controller on the actual Fender Mustang guitar, for the game software's Pro mode, as a way for 5-button players to have an intermediary step up to a real guitar using a combination of buttons and strings. Instead of five colored buttons, the Mustang has 6 buttons across 17 different frets, for a total of 102 buttons; the player needs to strike the corresponding buttons on the right frets similar to guitar strings. The player uses the "string box" that contains six stainless-steel strings which can detect which strings are being strummed, in place of a "strum bar" from the typical legacy "5 button" controller. In addition to Pro mode use, the Mustang can be used to play the game in Basic mode, and it functions as a full MIDI guitar, with a MIDI output connector providing compatibility with MIDI software sequencers and hardware devices. For use in gaming mode, each Mustang controller can only be used with the game console it is designed for (except unofficially if you connect through a MIDI-Pro Adapter, then any console's Mustang can be used with any console for Pro mode game play, although direction pad buttons, overdrive detection and Basic 5-button game play will be disabled). The Mustang Pro-Guitar is only a few inches smaller in length than the actual Mustang guitar, and being made of plastic, is much lighter to hold than an actual guitar. The neck is removable from the body for easier storage and transport.

Fender made an even further step up by turning an actual full-sized, 6-string Squier Stratocaster guitar into a Rock Band 3 Pro mode real guitar game controller. This is a true six-string electric guitar, with electronics built in to allow it to interface with the game to provide added features such as on-screen fret sensing. The Squier Stratocaster Guitar And Controller therefore has full MIDI output capabilities outside of the game in addition to being an actual standard guitar.

A demonstration of the Fender Squier Stratocaster Guitar And Controller at its Electronic Entertainment Expo debut showed it being played directly through an electric amplifier alongside other players on the other controllers while playing the game. Unlike the Mustang controller which uses fret buttons, the Squier being an actual guitar, uses real guitar strings, therefore it cannot be used in Basic button mode. However, it can be played in the game (locally or online) alongside other players using 5-button Basic controllers.

The Squier is "console-neutral": instead of having to buy a console-specific guitar, players need only purchase the MadCatz MIDI Pro-Adapter made for their Xbox 360, PlayStation 3 or Wii console, then simply plug any Squier Stratocaster Guitar And Controller into that for in-game use.

The Mustang Pro-Guitar controller was not available until a month after game launch. The Squier Stratocaster Guitar And Controller was not available at the game's launch either – it was finally released in March 2011 due to manufacturing delays in order to perfect the fretboard-sensing feature while keeping cost down as much as possible. In that time some players discovered that though unofficial, a third controller option was readily available from Inspired Instruments called the You Rock Guitar. The You Rock was a guitar synth much like the Mustang Pro-Guitar. In looks, and in function for the game, will play similar to the Mustang controller. It has six short nylon strings for strumming and picking on the body, like the Mustang, albeit with a rubber mesh in place of buttons along the fretboard. While the Mustang only has a MIDI jack, The You Rock has an additional standard 1/4"-inch audio jack, which can also be used to simulate a real guitar playing synthesized sounds from a standard 1/4" jack. This guitar also has a standard MIDI interface. Using firmware update 1.2 the You Rock is capable of sending the correct signals to the Mad Catz Midi Pro-Adapter in the same way as the Fender Squier Stratocaster. The You Rock guitar can be put into Rock Band Pro mode by simultaneously pressing the "Game" and "Guitar" buttons. The LED will display "rb".

==== Pro mode gameplay ====
During Pro mode play for guitar and bass, single notes are represented by a number, representing the fret on the guitar, over a single string. Chords are represented by solid bars that mimic waveforms. The base position for the player's hand on the fretboard is given by a number on a specific string. The shape of the bar over the other strings provide relative fret positions for the player's hand on the controller. The instrument controllers provide feedback to the player by sensing the player's current fingering, which is then shown as a waveform drawn at the base of the note track, in the same style as the chord representation, allowing the player to match their waveform to the chord's shape. Chord names are shown at the side of the track, and players can optionally enable a feature that numbers every fret position for a chord, closely resembling the appearance of guitar tablature. In addition, Pro Guitar and Bass include legato-style playing through hammer-ons and pull-offs, as well as slides on sustained notes along the strings represented by sustained note gems with slanted tails. Pro Guitar also includes open chords, arpeggios where the player holds a chord and plucks specific strings for it, and left-hand muting of notes.

On Easy difficulty Pro mode, the game will only present single notes to the player; Medium difficulty introduces chords, while Hard difficulty is a less-dense version of the full guitar track charted for Expert mode. The game adjusts which frets are used depending on which Pro model guitar is used, because the Mustang, being only a couple of inches smaller than a real guitar, has fewer frets than the Squier real guitar. Some leeway is given on Pro Guitar such as by missing a chord by one offset string.

=== Instrument controllers ===
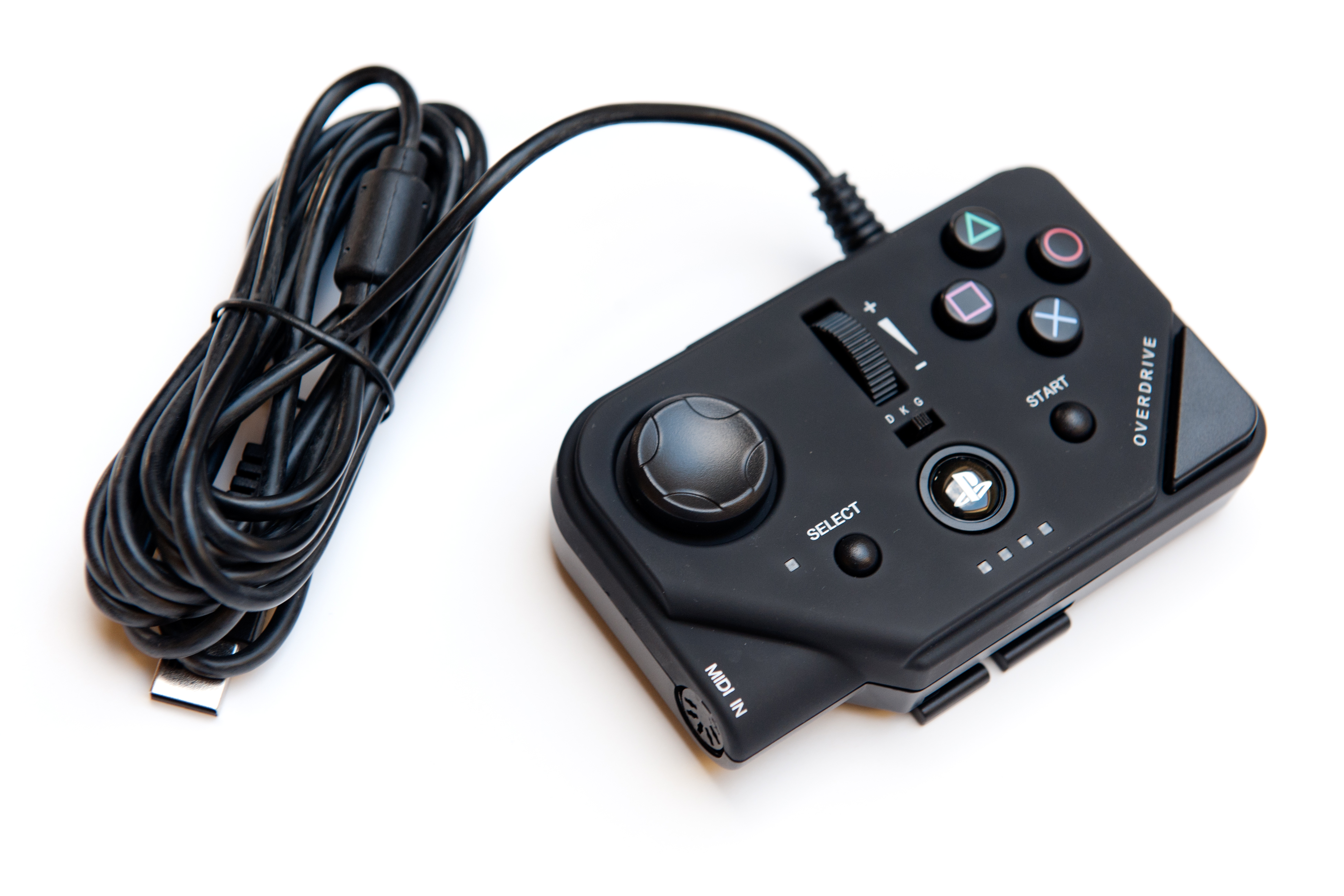
The MIDI Pro-Adapter allows players to use MIDI instruments as game inputs for the standard and pro modes.

All existing Rock Band and other compatible controllers continue to work for Basic mode. Basic guitar controllers can also be used to play Basic keyboard parts after unlocking the ability to do so in-game, while the keyboard controller can also in turn be used to play Basic guitar and bass parts without requiring the feature to be unlocked. A special MIDI adapter, also made by MadCatz and sold separately, allows players with existing MIDI-compatible keyboards, or drums to use them within the game; the unit will not work for most existing MIDI guitars due to the additional data that Harmonix registers over the MIDI data. In April 2010, Harmonix and game controller manufacturer Mad Catz entered a multi-year deal to allow Mad Catz to produce and sell its controllers alongside the Rock Band games.

In addition to the standalone game and controllers, Harmonix and MadCatz released a Rock Band 3 bundle package which includes the Basic/Pro RB3 keyboard controller and the game. Licensing prevented this bundle from being sold to PlayStation 3 users in the United States, but Harmonix worked with vendors to offer a "soft bundle" of the standalone game and keyboard at the same cost as the bundle, and to honor existing pre-orders for the bundle.

Three more bundles were made available in November 2011. Each bundle came with the game itself, a voucher for complementary downloadable song content, and choice of Mustang Pro-Guitar, Rock Band 3 Stratocaster Basic, or Rock Band 3 Fender Precision Wireless Bass (Basic) controller.

==== Premium Basic Guitar and Bass controllers ====
Existing "5 button" Basic guitar controllers from previous Rock Band games and other compatible games (such as Guitar Hero) can still be used interchangeably with real Pro instruments for non-Pro parts in Rock Band 3 (but not vice versa).

However, in addition to Pro mode guitar controllers, Harmonix added new dimensions of realism to their Basic guitar controller lineup. Premium and Limited Edition replica versions of Basic 5-button guitar controllers were released for the game by Mad Catz which resemble actual guitars in size, appearance and performance while remaining true to Basic 5-button game play.

For example, the (Basic) Rock Band 3 Wireless Fender Precision Bass Controller features, as the actual guitar it is modeled after – a thumb rest. The strum bar is now a double-strum bar, for emulating realistic two-fingered bass playing. The double strum bar can also be used interchangeably as a standard strum bar during game play, to suit the player's preferred playing style. Since real bass guitars do not have whammy bars, there is no whammy bar, but as in the real guitar, a knob dial can be used to manipulate in-game whammy notes. It is compatible with the 'Electro-Harmonix Overdrive Pedal' for controlling whammy effects with the player's foot. The controller is available in various colors to choose from such as seafoam green, candy apple red, and white.

The Rock Band 3 Wireless Fender Telecaster Player's Edition replica guitar controller features quieter more responsive buttons to replicate the feel of frets plus allow easier sliding chords, an upgraded strum bar, and touch activated overdrive directly above the strum bar. The whammy bar is adjustable and made by Bigsby out of solid metal. It is available in colors such as wood-grain butterscotch and light blue.

The Rock Band 3 Wireless Stratocaster Guitar Controller replica was released in November 2011 and is an upgrade to the original version. It also features quieter buttons and smoother action, to further replicate the feel of frets, allow sliding chords, and an improved strum bar.

The Rock Band Wooden Stratocaster Replica was released at the time of the game's release and is basically, a full-size actual wooden guitar body with all of the tuning keys, bridge, metal parts and fittings of the actual guitar left intact; but instead of strings, it has Basic 5-button premium buttons built into the neck. Since there are only 5 buttons and no strings, this one is for Basic game play only. The difference from the other Basic premium controllers is that it is the actual size and weight of a real guitar. It was made available in sunburst and candy apple red colors.

==== Drums ====
Existing drum kits from Rock Band, Guitar Hero, and other games, including the ION electronic drum kits, can be used for Basic mode play in Rock Band 3. For Pro drums, a three cymbal-pad set is added to the core drum kit; notes on screen are marked as a rounded note instead of rectangular to indicate a cymbal hit instead of a drum hit. MadCatz and other manufacturers already produced a cymbal add-ons for Rock Band 2 drum kits, but introduced a new version with the release of Rock Band 3. The player can optionally use 1 or 2 additional cymbal pads, configuring the Pro Drums mode to only recognize those. Players can also add a second foot pedal and configure the game to act as a second bass drum pedal or as a hi-hat pedal. Additionally, existing ION drum kits will work in Pro mode for Rock Band 3.

==== Keyboard ====
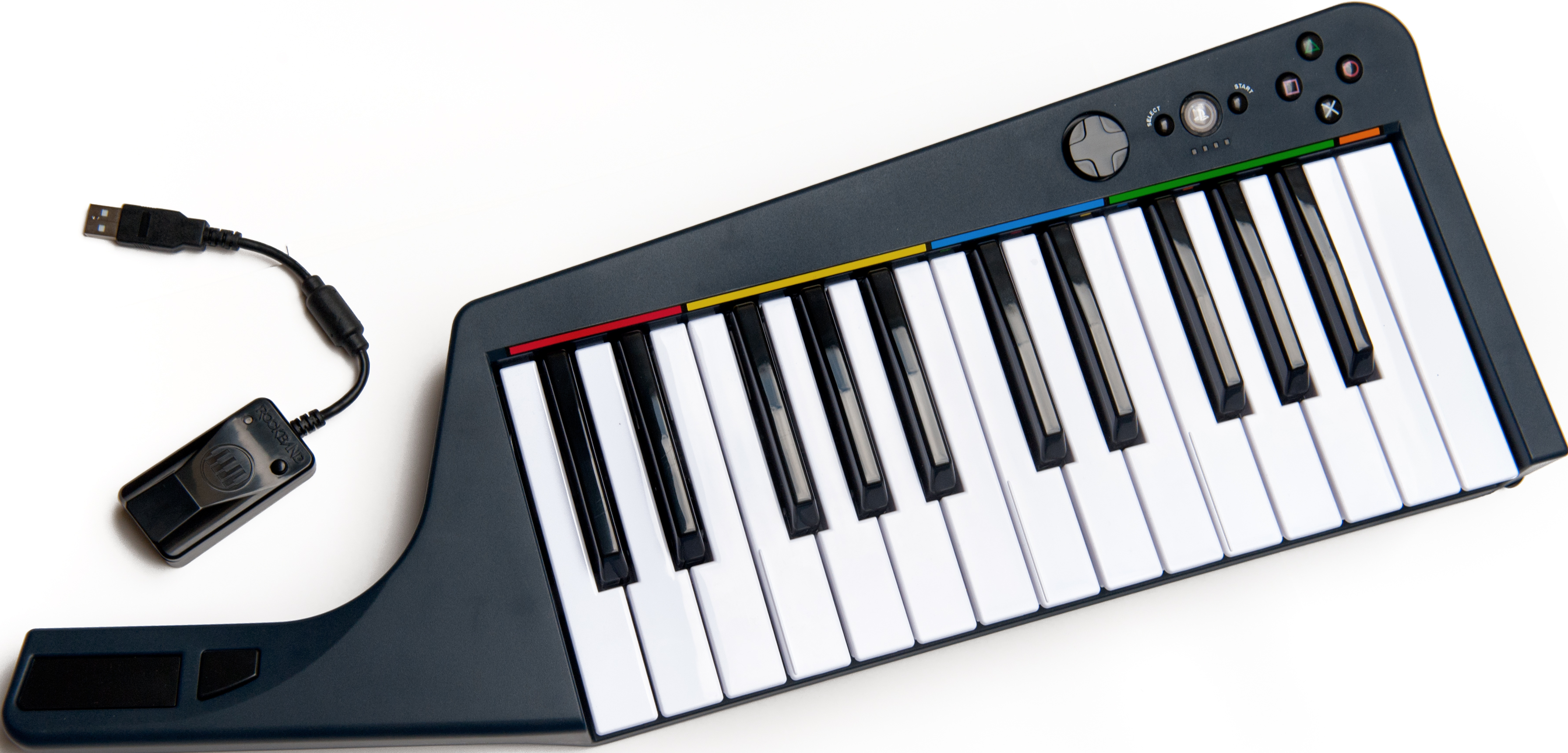
PlayStation 3 version of the Wireless Pro Keyboard, along with its wireless USB adapter. The keyboard controller can either be used horizontally or worn as a keytar, with an effects touchpad and overdrive button on the "neck" of the unit.

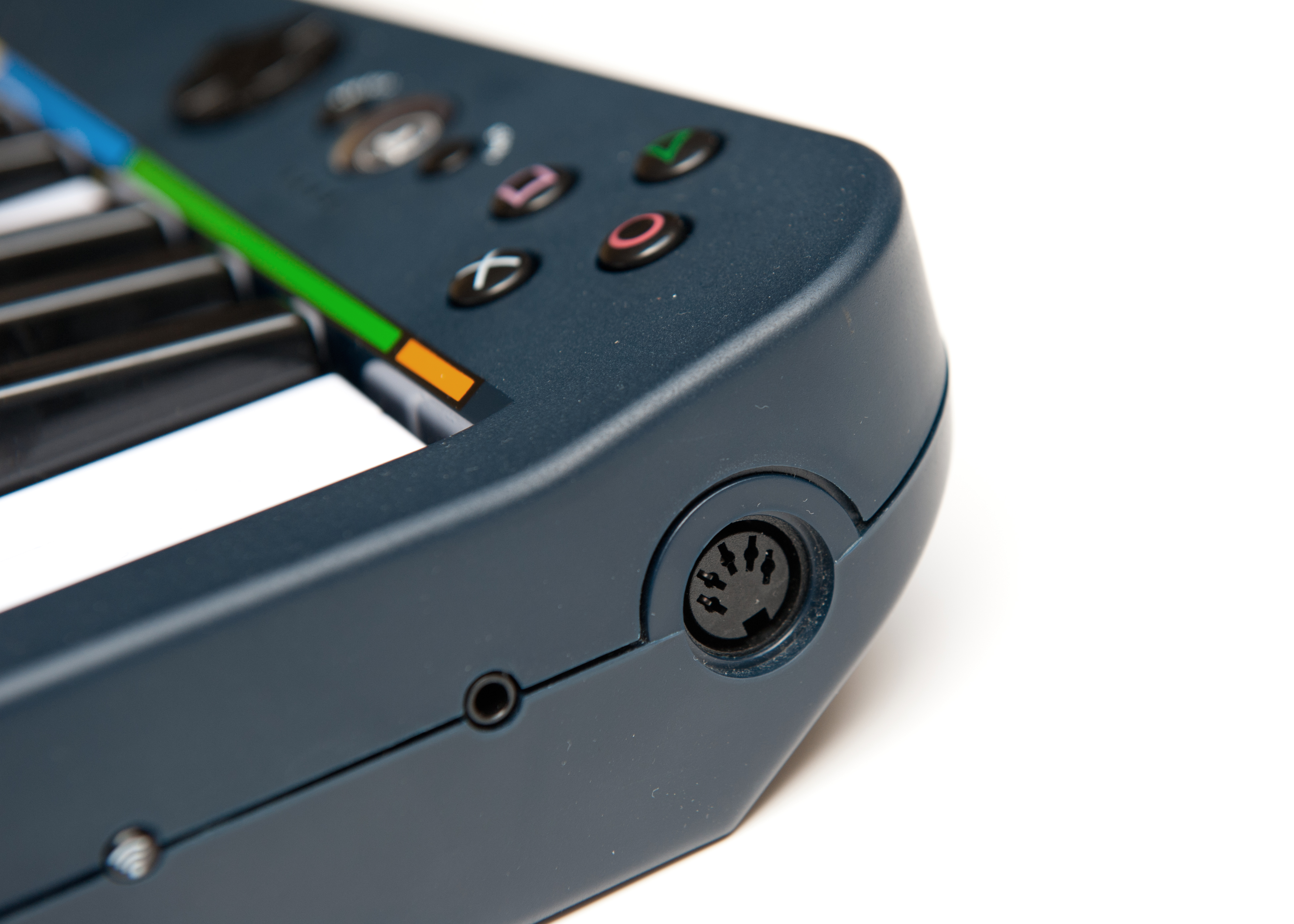
The MIDI port on the Wireless Pro Keyboard allows it to be connected to most MIDI-based synthesizers and computers, which in turn allows it to be used as a fully functional 25-key (two-octave) keyboard.

Rock Band 3 introduced keyboard parts for songs for the first time in a rhythm game. MadCatz produced the new keyboard controller for the official release which resembles a keytar with a handle to one side; this allows it to be either worn using a guitar strap or placed on a horizontal surface. The keyboard features 25 full-sized velocity-sensitive keys, and is MIDI compatible, allowing it to be used outside the game. For instance, Freezepop, a band which has close ties to members of Harmonix, has used the keyboard controller as a keytar for their stage shows.

Players need to strike notes and chords, marked to specific keys on the display, to score points. In Basic mode, five white keys, from the middle C to G, each correspond to colored notes on screen, and are played in a similar manner to existing guitar and bass parts; these keys can also be used to play guitar and bass parts on the keyboard. Overdrive is activated by pressing a special button on the controller. A touch-pad in the handle of the unit functions as a pitch wheel, providing for a whammy bar-type effect on sustained notes.

Pro mode for keyboards shows during gameplay ten white keys and the corresponding black keys, as the full range cannot be displayed on screen; Two visual cues are given to the player to identify what position on the controller they should play relative to the keys shown on-screen. One cue is through highlighting the entire lane that corresponds to a played note whether correct or not; this is designed to help keep the player's hand positions correlated on the unit. A second cue is uniquely grouped coloring of a channel containing a set of 5 keys matching similar markings on the keyboard unit to identify the correct area of the keyboard that the player should be on. Pro keyboard charting includes notes and chords using a combination of white and black keys. On Easy or Medium Pro keys, the range of keys on screen does not shift, but on Hard and Expert the range of keys shown on the screen shifts as the song necessitates, requiring the player to move their own hands in turn. Arrow indicators are displayed to indicate when the displayed area is about to shift left or right, giving the player time to compensate.

==== Vocals ====
Any USB-compatible microphone can be used for the vocal parts. A USB hub can be used for up to three microphone players. Rock Band 3 does not require the vocalists to be signed in on the console's systems; this allows Rock Band 3 to surpass the usual limitation of four local players that exists on the Wii and Xbox 360. Vocal harmonies cannot be performed by separate players over networked connections due to latency issues. Pitch correction technology developed by iZotope has been integrated into the game, allowing vocalists to add effects to their vocal performances within the game.

=== Nintendo DS version ===
The Nintendo DS version of Rock Band 3 is similar to Rock Band Unplugged or Lego Rock Band for the DS, and requires the player to manage playing four tracks at various times to prevent any single performance meter from dropping to zero.

The Nintendo DS version of Rock Band 3 follows the gameplay format of Rock Band Unplugged for the PlayStation Portable and the Nintendo DS version of Lego Rock Band. There are no special instrument attachments; instead, gameplay is designed around matching notes using the face buttons on the DS. Each of the 25 songs, a subset of the songs available on the Rock Band 3 disc for other consoles, are presented as a set of four tracks, one for each instrument, with the player able to move between them. To perform well, the player must move between tracks using the shoulder buttons and succeed to match a phrase of notes using the face buttons of the controller in order to boost the band's performance meter; in normal game modes, this will cause the track to play automatically by itself for a brief period allowing the player to focus on the other tracks. The player can fail a song if they cannot match notes correctly, or by ignoring a single track for too long. The DS version includes a single-player career mode and both cooperative and competitive play modes. Additional features that were present in Unplugged also are included in Rock Band 3 for the DS, but have been renamed to match changes in the game's console modes. For example, the "Band Survival" mode from Unplugged, requiring the player to keep all the instruments going without any respite after successfully completing a track section, is called "Pro Mode" in Rock Band 3 for the DS.

== Development ==
Despite previous success of rhythm games, the genre as a whole saw nearly a 50% drop in revenues in 2009; sales of top-tier titles The Beatles: Rock Band and Guitar Hero 5 were significantly off from initial projections. Part of this has been attributed to the late-2000s recession limiting new purchases, but other analysis have speculated that consumers had grown tired of purchasing new iterations of instrument controllers for the same gameplay. While designing Rock Band 3, Harmonix sought to capture the playing experience that "really started this whole phenomenon in the first place", according to project director Daniel Sussman. Harmonix's CEO, Alex Rigopulos, stated that "Our ambition for Rock Band 3 was really to re-energize and reinvigorate the (music game) category and advance it and move it forward." In introducing the game to journalists at a closed media event about a month prior to the 2010 Electronic Entertainment Expo, Harmonix called Rock Band 3 a "disruptive title" for the music game industry. Another aspect that Harmonix considered was "a ground-up rebuild of the Rock Band platform" and how players could interact better with the game and music library, according to Sussman.

Harmonix included the keyboard controller to help address these goals. The keyboard functionality was "designed basically to answer that staleness factor" that has been seen in music games, as said by Sussman. The gameplay for Basic keys was designed so that it was party-accessible, simple, and easy for existing Rock Band players to learn. Pro keys, on the other hand, was designed so that it would be fun playing the accurate actual notes of the song. The team also included Pro mode to help invigorate existing players to give them new challenges, aimed at those that "had any aspirations of connecting with the music in a deeper way", according to senior designer Sylvain Dubrofsky. Sussman commented that the combination of existing and new gameplay modes provides "an experience that is both accessible to players who are just getting into this thing, and builds something for the hard-core player who is maybe a little bored with where music games are". Sussman noted that there still remains a large gap between mastering the Pro modes and playing real instruments: "We see Pro as a different experience from the five-button simulation, but not necessarily a track to expertise." Sussman further commented that inclusion of Pro mode, particularly at higher difficulty levels, was "because it shows the potential ceiling of where this can take you". However, Harmonix was still dedicated to helping to "open doors" for players interested in learning real musical instruments, such as by including appropriate music fundamentals that can be used outside of the game. Harmonix created the Pro Guitar charts for songs through careful audio interpretation of master tracks and through watching live performances of the songs to ensure they were using the correct chords.

=== Promotion ===
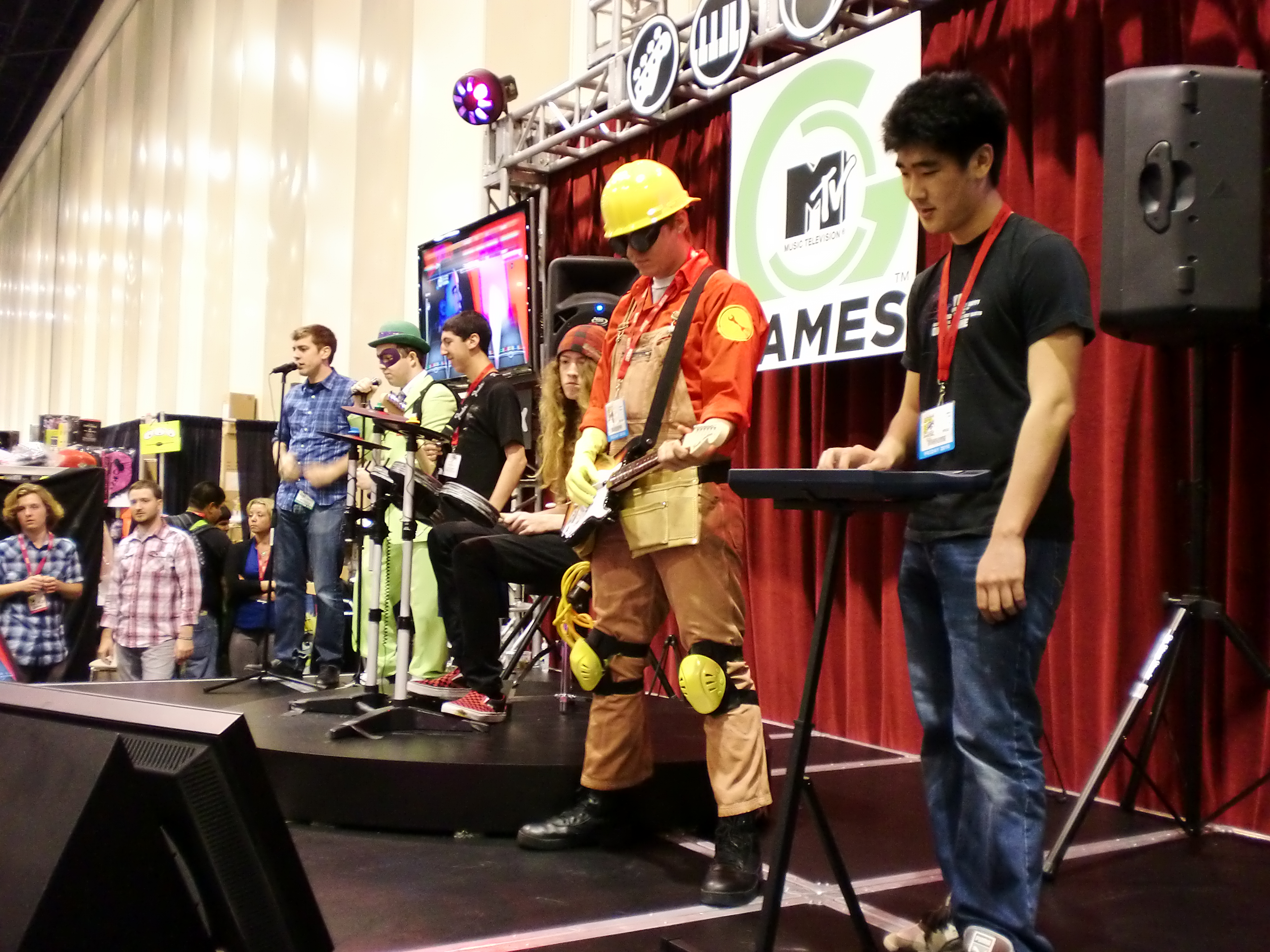
Six people playing Rock Band 3 at San Diego Comic-Con, July 23, 2010

Rock Band 3 was distributed by Electronic Arts after the two companies reached a continued agreement for distribution of the series, which was initially set to expire in March 2010, with the final EA-distributed title to have been Green Day: Rock Band.

A pre-E3 event occurred on May 20, 2010, to provide exclusive coverage of the game to selected gaming journalists, who would remain under news embargo until June 11, 2010, just prior to E3. The first evidence that Rock Band 3 would include keyboards came from a teaser image for the game in the Green Day: Rock Band demo, released in late May 2010; the image showed 5 icons, 4 representing the existing instruments in the game and the fifth showing a keyboard layout. Ars Technica claimed via a mole, that the unit would be a "keytar", and that the game would include Pro mode. Ars Technica later claimed that Harmonix requested to have the article removed due to the embargo, and insisted that the unit should not be referred to as a "keytar". Ars Technica further commented that while other gaming sites had to wait until June 11 when the embargo was lifted, USA Today was able to reveal their stories the day before, scooping the other sites who had originally remained quiet on Ars Technica's story for fear of breaking the embargo.

The 2010 E3 Game Critics Awards awarded Rock Band 3 for the "Best Social/Casual Game", and included both the new keyboard and the Pro guitar peripherals as "Best Hardware" nominees. The game was also awarded the title of "Best Music Game" as well as being nominated for "Most Innovative" by GameTrailers.

Several offers were made available to players who pre-ordered the game, depending on vendor. In North America, those that pre-ordered through GameStop received early access to three downloadable tracks for the game; "Burning Down the House" by Talking Heads, "My Own Summer" by Deftones, and "Blue Monday" by New Order. Players preordering the game through Amazon.com or Best Buy received immediate access to a unique in-game guitar for their avatars.

After the dissolution of MTV Games, MadCatz took over the publication and distribution rights for the game. They re-released the game in several promotional instrument bundles in November 2011, including one featuring the Fender Mustang Pro-Guitar controller. All of the bundles included access to five downloadable tracks with Pro mode.

=== Post-release support ===
Harmonix continued to support Rock Band 3, not only through additional downloadable content, but by continually updating the core software for PlayStation 3 and Xbox 360 owners, addressing critical issues and incorporating new features. This included adding support for the Rock Band Network Audition mode for Rock Band Network 2.0 (supporting the unique Rock Band 3 feature set), and, due to high demand from the game's fans, unofficial support for the light-and-fog stage kit device previously developed for Rock Band 2 on the Xbox 360. Official support for Rock Band 3 ended with the release of six downloadable songs in 2015. These final six songs were "Shepherd of Fire" by Avenged Sevenfold, "R U Mine?" by Arctic Monkeys, "Something from Nothing" by Foo Fighters, "I Still Believe" by Frank Turner, "Rize of the Fenix" by Tenacious D and "Back to the Shack" by Weezer. "I Still Believe" was released for free while all other songs were priced with Rock Band 3's standard pricing scheme.

== Soundtrack ==
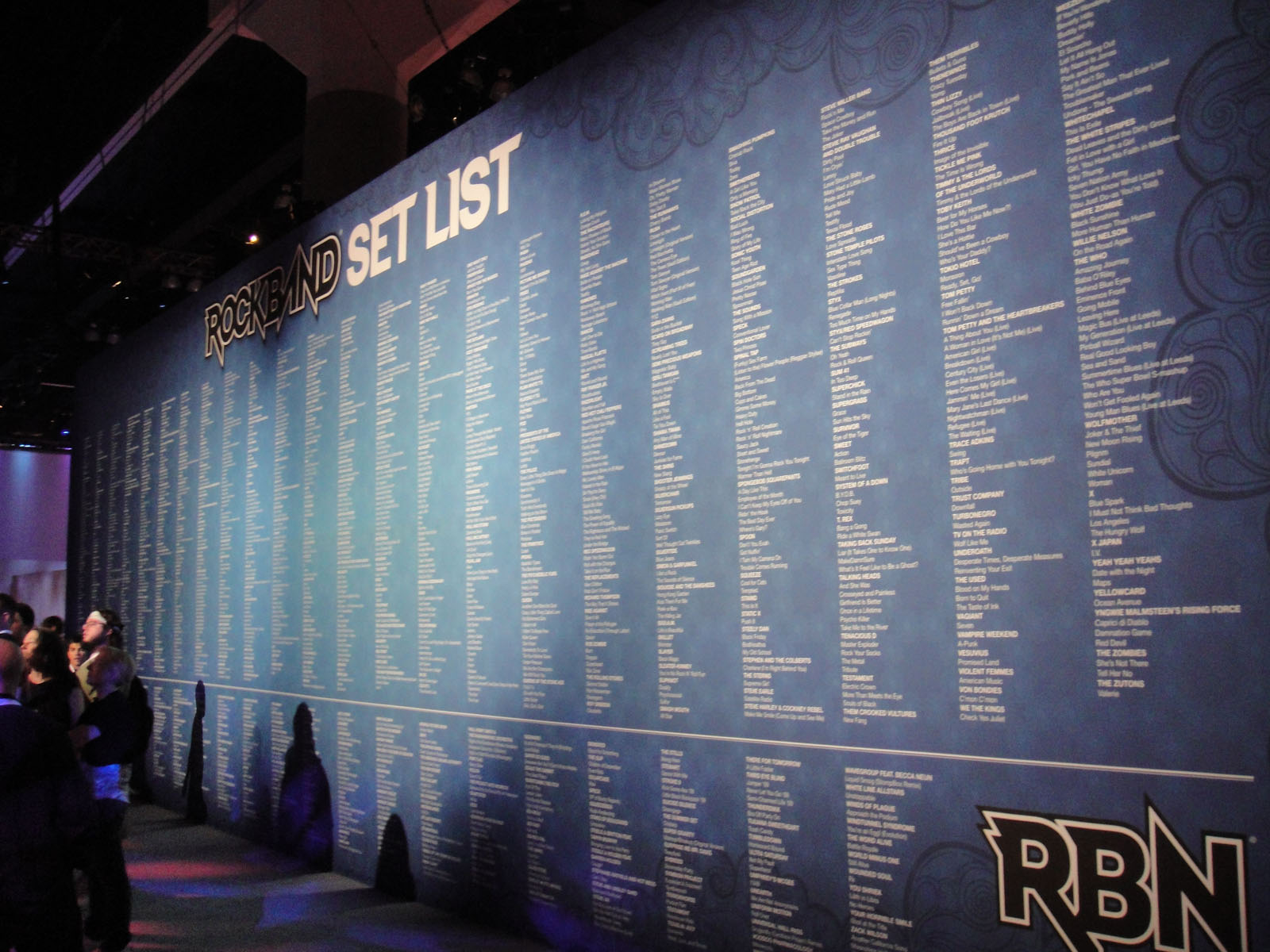
A list of Rock Band songs displayed on the wall at E3 2010. The upper part of the wall lists songs released by Harmonix, either on a game disc or as downloadable content. The lower part shows Rock Band Network songs.

The full soundtrack for Rock Band 3 features 83 songs, including a mix of tracks that made use of the new keyboard peripheral. The full setlist was formally announced a few days after the 2010 Gamescom, at which the list was accidentally revealed during a video interview which had it scrolling in the background. The Nintendo DS version of the game features a 26-song subset of the consoles' setlist.

Harmonix released new downloadable songs for Rock Band 3 each week, starting launch week with a set of twelve songs from The Doors. Downloadable songs since the game's release include, when appropriate, keyboard and vocal harmony support within the base cost of the song (normally about US$2 per song). Due to the cost and effort to create Pro guitar and bass tracks, Harmonix releases these additional authored parts as a separate download for certain songs with an additional US$1 cost. Downloadable songs released by Harmonix after Rock Band 3's release are not compatible with previous games in the series due to changes in the song format.

The majority of songs from previous Rock Band games, including both on-disc songs and songs offered as downloadable content, are playable in Rock Band 3, which led to more than 2,000 songs already being available when the game was released. Rock Band Network can also be played in Rock Band 3 and, unlike in Rock Band 2, they can be played in all game modes. A new version of Rock Band Network, called Rock Band Network 2.0, allowed songs to be authored with harmonies, Basic and Pro keys, and Pro drums, but did not support Pro Mode real guitar and bass charting due to the complexity of authoring those parts and a lack of qualified users able to test them.

== Reception ==
Reception

Aggregate scores
Aggregator	Score
GameRankings	X360: 92.44%
Metacritic	X360: 93/100; PS3: 91/100

Review scores
Publication	Score
Edge	10/10
Eurogamer	10/10
G4	5/5
Game Informer	9.25/10
GameSpot	9.0/10
GameSpy	4.5/5
IGN	8.5/10

Rock Band 3 received universal acclaim from gaming journalists who considered the game to be a major jump from Rock Band 2 and a pinnacle of the rhythm game genre. Matt Miller of Game Informer called the title "a culmination of Harmonix's efforts to bring music to the masses". Ben Kuchera of Ars Technica commented that for Rock Band 3, "This is the new state of the art for rhythm games, and it's hard to find fault with what's being offered." Joystiq's Griffin McElroy asserted that Rock Band 3 "is the greatest rhythm game ever made, and quite possibly the only rhythm game you need to own". Reviews praised the incorporation of realistic instruments and the education of how to play them into the video game setting, seeing the title as a means of preparing players to pick up real instruments. Chad Sapieha of The Globe and Mail said that with the release of Rock Band 3 "we are just a hair's breadth away from moving beyond make believe" while the New York Times's Seth Schiesel stated that "Harmonix has brilliantly torn down the wall between music games and real music".

Reviews praised the introduction of keyboard and the new controller. Miller described the keyboard peripheral as "small and light" with a number of options for how one can play it, with Johnny Minkley of Eurogamer adding that the keytar approach makes the keyboard peripheral "gaming's next must-have shame-maker". Many reviews noted that while there are some enjoyable and difficult non-Pro versions of the keyboard charts, playing in this mode was not much different from the established "five button" guitar method, and that the real enjoyment from the peripheral was through Pro mode. IGN's Hilary Goldstein noted that the keyboard addition allows Harmonix to expand the types of songs that one would previously have never expected to appear in a Rock Band game, such as Warren Zevon's "Werewolves of London" or any Elton John song. Sam Machkovech for The Atlantic expressed similar sentiments, adding that with the ability to include more keyboard or synthesizer-heavy songs into the game, "the songs are just plain better".

The new Pro mode was critically acclaimed as the primary feature that distinguished Rock Band 3 from other music games in the field. Minkley stated that the inclusions of Pro features "at once dramatically expand the potential of the game and fundamentally change the approach required to play and enjoy it". Reviewers appreciated the training modes, including their integration into the overall game's career progression and the breadth of material that is covered. Nina Shen Rastogi of Slate commented that Rock Band 3's training modes helps to overcome the discouraging early period of trying to learn guitar as "the gaming elements will mask the rote, homeworklike nature of the guitar training process". Kuchera noted that the modes were aimed at those who have some understanding of music theory already; "If this is your first introduction to music theory, though, you may need a little more explanation", he concluded. This lament was similarly stated by Machkovech, who felt the lessons had "text that was written by a musical savant" that would be too confusing to those without musical backgrounds and too simple for those trained in music arts. Chris Kohler of Wired described the experience he and a friend had where after playing through Devo's "Whip It" on Pro guitar and keyboard, they were able to retain enough muscle memory to play their respective parts on real instruments, albeit not perfectly; Kohler summarized his experience that "Just playing Rock Band 3 taught us a little bit of actual music".

A primary consideration for the game was the cost of entry to enjoy the new features of the game particularly in Pro mode; both the cost of the new keyboard and Pro guitars (ranging from $80 to 280) and the time investment to learn these aspects was considered high and may only cater to niche players. The Metro noted that if one does not purchase any of the additional hardware controllers, "it's not much different to Rock Band 2". Goldstein commented that the amount of investment into the game will affect one's perception of the game's value: "either something completely new and challenging or just more tracks to rock out to". Goldstein further noted that with the cost and time spent on the Pro guitar models, "why not spend a little more and buy the real thing". Several reviewers commented that the buttoned Mustang Pro guitar is not as sturdy as other instruments and does not have the same tactile feel as a real guitar. Specifically, the reviewers noted that the width of the button impressions do not vary in width as real guitar strings would, and there is no tactile feedback as one would have with a fretboard. These reviewers suggested that players, if dedicated to the Pro guitar mode, to wait for the stringed Fender Squier which had more favorable reviews.

The game's soundtrack was considered to be "the most unusual and varied in the franchise" by Miller, and "an eclectic collection that's a little more pop than metal" by Goldstein. Kuchera considered the set list to be one of the best in any music game, "spanning decades and genres and bringing a wide variety of songs to suit any taste".

During the 14th Annual Interactive Achievement Awards, the Academy of Interactive Arts & Sciences awarded Rock Band 3 for "Outstanding Achievement in Soundtrack", along with a nomination for "Family Game of the Year".

=== Sales ===
Initial sales figures from the United Kingdom showed that, for the two days that the game was available, only about 7,400 units were sold across all platforms, placing Rock Band 3 as the 26th-best-selling title during the week ending October 30, 2010. The title was the 15th best selling game in North America for October of that year based on sales data from the NPD Group. In an interview with Edge after the holiday season in February 2011, Alex Rigopulos stated that Rock Band 3 hadn't "yet sold to the level we hoped it would out of the gate", but believed that there would still be significant potential in the title, in considering the then-recent discontinuation of the Guitar Hero series and then-pending release of the Fender Squier PRO guitar unit. Though exact numbers had not been revealed by Harmonix, Rigopulos did state that Rock Band 3 had trailed Harmonix's other game, Dance Central, also originally released in 2010, which had reportedly sold 1.2 million units in North America by the end of the 2010 holiday season. On the eve of the release of Rock Band 4 in October 2015, 1.2 million units of Rock Band 3 had been sold, with 400,000 of those units sold after Mad Catz had taken over publication of the game.

In 2012, after the end of the holiday season following the 2011 re-release, Harmonix released a statement saying they were pleased with the continued performance of Rock Band and its downloadable content. The statement said weekly releases would continue with no plans to stop, then announced several new projects were in the works, going from the end of the year into 2013. Regular DLC for Rock Band 3 was discontinued in April 2013, though special packs were released just prior to Harmonix' announcement of Rock Band 4 in early 2015.
