= Christine Southworth =

American composer (born 1978)

Christine Southworth (b. Boston, Massachusetts, January 2, 1978) is an American composer of postminimal music and works with combinations of Western ensembles, electronics, and world music ensembles including Balinese gamelan and bagpipes. She performs Balinese gamelan and gender wayang with Cambridge, Massachusetts-based Gamelan Galak Tika, as well as Galician Gaita and Great Highland Bagpipes. She co-founded Ensemble Robot, a cooperative of engineers, artists and musicians working together to invent robotic musical instruments. She was also the general manager of Gamelan Galak Tika from 2004 through 2013. Her own music incorporates her work with Balinese gamelan and with technology and electronics, as well as reaching beyond these influences with an expanded palette of contemporary classical, jazz and rock, and world music from Africa, Asia and Eastern Europe.

Southworth has released four albums on Airplane Ears Music: Zap! Music for Van de Graaff Generator, Tesla Coils, Instruments and Voices (2008), Gamelan Galak Tika: Bronze Age Space Age (2009), Christine Southworth: String Quartets (2013). and In My Mind and In My Car (2013). Southworth's compositions have been performed throughout the U.S., Europe, and Indonesia by ensembles including Kronos Quartet, Gamelan Galak Tika, Calder Quartet, Bang on a Can All-Stars, Gamelan Semara Ratih, California EAR Unit, Andrew W.K., and Ensemble Robot. She has received awards from the American Music Center, LEF Foundation, American Composers Forum, Meet the Composer, New England Foundation for the Arts (NEFA), the MIT Eloranta Fellowship, and fellowships from Bang on a Can (2009), UCross Foundation (2012), and The Hermitage Artist Retreat (2014).

== Career ==
Southworth's compositional career began in 1999 with a trip to Bali, Indonesia, where she began studying Gender Wayang with I Wayan Loceng, in the village of Sukawati. Upon returning to the United States, Arnold Dreyblatt's Orchestra of Excited Strings premiered her short piece Timor Cotton at MIT Kresge Auditorium, which was based on styles she had learned in Bali. In 2002, she was a fellow at the first annual Bang on a Can Summer Institute of Music at Mass MOCA.

She attended the Computer Music and Multimedia Composition (MEME) program at Brown University from 2004 to 2006], during which she premiered her hour-long work Zap! Music for Van De Graaff Generator, Tesla Coils, Instruments and Voices at the Boston Museum of Science's Theater of Electricity. The first performance of Zap! on February 4, 2004, overfilled the Boston Museum of Science's Theater of Electricity with energized crowds of students, professors, artists, children, and adults. The Boston Phoenix called the show "truly electrifying," describing that "Ever since Bob Dylan, 'going electric' has had many connotations, but this was something different: though Zap! utilized the talents of a flutist, two keyboardists, a cellist, a guitarist, a bassist, a drummer, a vocalist, a double-helix-shaped robotic xylophone, sound engineers, and computer programmers, the centerpiece of Southworth's performance was electricity itself, as millions of volts buzzed, fizzled, and sparked in deafening cracks that punctuated her music." (Will Spitz, Boston Phoenix) In 2008, she released a recording of "Zap!" featuring Robert Black (bass), David Cossin (percussion), Felix Fan (cello), Philippa Thompson (voice), Charles Whalen (guitar), and Evan Ziporyn (clarinet/keyboards). The album received praise from reviewers including WNYC's John Schaefer, "Classical music certainly not in danger of becoming a museum piece" and was named "Pick of the Week" on WNYC on July 30, 2008.

In 2007, Southworth was commissioned by the Carlsbad Music Festival to compose "Honey Flyers" for the Calder Quartet. "Honey Flyers" received wide acclaim after performances at Le Poisson Rouge in New York, The Coolidge Corner Theater in Brookline, MA, Lakeshore Theater in Chicago, and the Swedish American Theater in San Francisco, described as " an absolutely beautiful song reminiscent of a combination of God Is An Astronaut mixed with the Tosca Tango Orchestra's Waking Life soundtrack, with huge dramatic breaks and patterns that drew out the beauty of these "Honey Flyers" by Joe Dahlstrom of JamBase The Chicago performance was reviewed by Laurie Rojas of Time Out Chicago: "Clapping didn't have to wait for the end of the piece; head banging had never felt so painless; foot stomping had never been so welcome. A string quartet has rarely been so loose. The members could rarely hold themselves from smiling and rocking out, banging their heads to their own chords."

In 2009, Southworth was the first composer to be commissioned by The Explorers Club in New York, which commissioned "Volcano" for the Calder Quartet, and was awarded the Bang on a Can People's Commissioning Fund commission for "Concerning the Doodle" for the Bang on a Can All-Stars which was premiered on February 24, 2010, at Merkin Hall at the Kauffman Center in New York, NY. Allan Kozinn from The New York Times described the performance "Christine Southworth's "Concerning the Doodle" accompanies a film (about the adventures and fantasies of a dog) by the Clever Girls Collaborative. It is straightforward, texturally and harmonically: the piece begins as an assertive blast of hard rock, driven by David Cossin's drumming, the guitarist Mark Stewart's power chords and Robert Black's solid bass. But Ms. Southworth soon moves the players through a parade of quirkier, bright-hued pop styles in an appealingly unpredictable structure driven by the film."

Also in 2009, she was commissioned by Performing Arts Center for a work for Balinese Gamelan Selonding with electronics, which was premiered at the International Gamelan Festival Amsterdam at the Lichthal Tropenmuseum by Gamelan Semara Ratih on September 10, 2010, and she was commissioned by the National Film Preservation Foundation to accompany historical films for the collection Treasures V: The American West. On August 13, 2010, she premiered "Supercollider," for the Kronos Quartet and Gamelan Elektrika, at the Lincoln Center Out of Doors Festival to an audience of approximately 5000. A subsequent performance at MIT's Festival of Arts, Science and Technology was hailed by the Boston Globe's Jeremy Eichler as "coolly exhilarating", "courted both common ground and the energy of culture clash by pitting the Kronos Quartet in traditional and avant-gardish sonorities against the interlaced rhythmic complexities of the gamelan."

Yo-yo Ma's Silk Road Project commissioned Southworth to compose La Fée Verte for Galician gaita, string quartet and percussion in 2012, and in 2013 she began collaborating with Evan Ziporyn on an evening length work for solo bass clarinet and electronics, called In My Mind and In My Car, released as a digital album in fall 2013 by Airplane Ears Music.

Southworth's most recent album Christine Southworth: String Quartets, featuring the Kronos Quartet, Gamelan Galak Tika's Gamelan Elektrika, The Calder Quartet, and Face the Music, received acclaim from Frank Oteri and WNYC's New Sounds

== Recordings ==
- In My Mind and in My Car (2013, Airplane Ears Music)

Solo Clarinet / Bass Clarinet performed by Evan Ziporyn, music by Christine Southworth and Evan Ziporyn

- Christine Southworth: String Quartets (2013, Airplane Ears Music)
- Gamelan Galak Tika: Bronze Age Space Age (2009, Airplane Ears Music)

by Gamelan Galak Tika w/ Ensemble Robot & Camerata Gamelanica, with music by Christine Southworth, Ramon Castillo, Po-Chun Wang, and Midori Matsuo

- ZAP! Music for Van de Graaff Generator, Tesla Coils, Instruments, and Voices (2008, Airplane Ears Music)

== Music ==
=== Standard ensembles ===
==== String quartets ====
- The Music Room (2013, 5'15") for Apple Hill Quartet

Commissioned by the Redfern Arts Center on Brickyard Pond.

- La Fée Verte (2012, 12') for Galician gaita, string quartet and percussion

Commissioned by Yo-yo Ma and The Silk Road Project

- Super Collider (2010, 18') for Kronos Quartet & Gamelan Elektrika
- Volcano (2009, 8') for string quartet + piano/percussion/sampler/voice

Commissioned by the Explorers Club for The Calder Quartet and Danny Holt.

- Honey Flyers (2007, 25') for string quartet + honeybee samples

Commissioned by the Carlsbad Music Festival for the Calder Quartet

- Mesem (2005, 2:00) string quartet
- Wild Warped Wax (2001, 8:34) String quartet in three movements.

==== Solo instrumentalists ====
- Sharktooth Frenzy (2014, 4') solo pianist with snare drum and bass drum
- Sandpiper Dance (2014, 4'40") solo violin
- Scale (2013, 6'18") cello, electronics

For Eric Byers, inspired by mountain climbing and The Nose of El Capitan.

- In My Mind and In My Car (2013, 23') 4 movements for solo clarinet / bass clarinet plus electronics.

For Evan Ziporyn. Premiered September 7, 2013, at Contemporary Arts International (CAI) First Biennial Festival of Sound Art and Performance Art in Acton, MA.
1. In My Mind and In My Car (5:54)
2. Monks Not Thelonious (6:20)
3. Blow / In the Storm (5:50)
4. Underwater (4:55)

- Ann Lee Songs (2011, 20') soprano, electronics

Song Cycle for Shaker mother Ann Lee. Commissioned by soprano Anne Harley.

- Khaen Song (2005, 2:30) solo cello

==== Chamber ensembles ====
- 100 Pieces for 2 Pianos (2011, 50') two pianos

Commissioned by Radio Orchestra New York

- How the Cowboy Makes His Lariat (2010, 3:20) two acoustic guitars

Commissioned by National Film Preservation Foundation for Treasures V: The [American] West

- Seeing Yosemite with David A. Curry (2010, 3:31) – violin, cello, piano, guitar, bass, drums

Commissioned by National Film Preservation Foundation for Treasures V: The [American] West

- Concerning the Doodle (2010, 14') – clarinet, cello, bass, guitar, piano, percussion

Commissioned by Bang on a Can People's Commissioning Fund.

- JAMU (v.3) (2009, 10') – clarinet, violin, cello, piano, percussion, and electronics

Commissioned by California E.A.R. Unit

- Wind Quintet #1 (2005, 2:40)
- Mars Polar Landing (2003, 7') for clarinet, sax, trumpet, drum set, vibraphone, marimba, guitar, and bass
- Feed and Fly (2002, 6:19) for clarinet, electric guitar, cello, bass, piano, drum kit, and optional Balinese gangsa and reong.
- Elf Grass (2002, 7:53) for clarinet, violin, cello, bass, and piano.
- Timor Cotton (2001) for marimba, vibraphone, violin, and electric guitar

==== Large ensembles / orchestra / wind ensemble ====
- The Green Fairy (2013, 12') for chamber orchestra
- Bend (2005, 4:30) for orchestra
- Play Me (2002, 16') for chamber orchestra with electric guitar; also arrangement for wind ensemble

Won American Composers Forum competition for reading by New England Conservatory Wind Ensemble.

=== Non-standard chamber ensembles ===
- Jamu (revised 2013, 7:30) for small Balinese gamelan, violin, cello, piano and bass clarinet

Commissioned by Radius Ensemble.

- La Fée Verte (2012, 12') for Galician gaita, string quartet and percussion

Commissioned by Yo-yo Ma's Silk Road Project

- Talek (2011, 6') for banjo, Galician gaita, & clarinet

Commissioned by Roger Michel

- Super Collider (2010, 18') for Kronos Quartet & Gamelan Galak Tika's Gamelan Elektrika

Premiered at Lincoln Center Out of Doors Festival, August 13, 2010, by Kronos Quartet and Gamelan Galak Tika

- Zap! (2005, 45' in 7 movements) for Van de Graaff Generator, Lyricon, voices, guitar, cello, bass, percussion, piano, robotic xylophone and electronics.

Commissioned by the Boston Museum of Science

==== Gamelan + other instruments or robots ====
- Orang Besi (2010, 8') for Selonding Gamelan and electronics

Commissioned by ANMARO Performing Arts for Gamelan Semara Ratih. Premiered at International Gamelan Festival Amsterdam September 2010.

- Mars Rover / Snow White (2008, 6') for Beta gamelan (just intonation tuning), bass, keyboard, drum set, and computer voices
- Heavy Metal (2006, 18') for Balinese Gamelan Gong Kebyar, guitar, violin, bass, lyricon, and robotic instruments

Commissioned by the Boston Museum of Science with the support of NEFA and Meet the Composer.

- Jamu (2002, 10:30) for small Balinese gamelan, violin, electric guitar, and bass.
- Flying Goldfish Flower (Sekar Ikan Emas Yang Terbang) (2002, 7:17) Gamelan Gong Kebyar.
- Music for Two Gender (2000) Suite for two gender wayang, balinese metallophones which accompany shadow puppet plays.

==== Robots + small ensembles ====
- Robot Organic (2007, 10') for pipe organ, bass clarinet, Whirlybot & Heliphon

Commissioned by Technology Review Magazine

=== Electronic ===
- In My Mind and in My Car (2013, 23') 4 movements for solo bass clarinet and electronics, written for Evan Ziporyn

1. In My Mind and In My Car (5:54)
2. Monks Not Thelonious (6:20)
3. Blow / In The Storm (5:50)
4. Underwater (4:55)

- Morse Norse Love Song (2013, 3:36)
- Myanmar (2013, 3:30)
- Proton Shake (2013, 3:14)
- Jamu (remixed 2005, 5') for electronic gamelan and robots, performed by Eric Gunther
- Violin/Clarinet (2001, 2:09) Original electronic piece made from sampled violin and clarinet
- HarmonicsonG (2001, 4:30) Experiment with low G string on a violin, forming a song out of the harmonics.
- Clapping Music (2001, 4:45) Instrumental ambient music commissioned by MIT for production of BHOMA, directed by Sudipto Chatterjee.

== Awards ==
- Hermitage Artist Retreat Fellow – 2014
- NEFA / Meet the Composer Grant – 2012
- Silk Road Ensemble Commission – 2012
- UCross Foundation Fellow – 2012
- American Music Center CAP Recording Grant – 2011
- International Festival of Gamelan Amsterdam Commission – 2010
- Kronos Quartet / Lincoln Center Out of Doors Commission – 2010
- Explorers Club Commission – 2009
- Bang on a Can People's Commissioning Fund Commission – 2009
- Meet the Composer Creative Connections Grant – 2009
- LEF Foundation grants for Ensemble Robot – 2003, 2005, 2006, 2007
- Boston Museum of Science Composer in Residence – 2005–07
- NEFA / Meet the Composer grant – 2005
