= Radius Ensemble =

American classical music group

== About ==
Radius Ensemble is a classical music chamber group based in Cambridge, Massachusetts. The mission of Radius Ensemble is to "reinvigorate classical music for a new generation."

Accessibility is a fundamental philosophy of Radius. The group rejects the stuffiness and elitism often associated with chamber music and seeks to attract a new, generally younger and more informal, audience to its performances. The ensemble is an artistic partner at MIT, performing at the breathtaking new Thomas Tull Concert Hall with occasional outreach concerts at various locations in the Greater Boston area.

Radius Ensemble plays a diverse blend of standard repertoire and more modern music, occasionally venturing into realms that could be classified as experimental. Further variety and flexibility is added to each performance by using a range of ensembles: solo instruments, smaller ensembles, and larger groups are regularly included in the same concert.

Radius was founded in 1999 by Jennifer Montbach who continues to serve as the group's artistic director and oboist.

== Personnel ==
There are ten core members of the Radius Ensemble. They are Sarah Brady on flute, Jennifer Montbach on oboe, Eran Egozy on clarinet, Meryl Summers on bassoon, Anne Howarth on French horn, Sarah Bob on piano, Gabriela Díaz and Katherine Winterstein on violin, Noriko Futagami on viola, and Miriam Bolkosky on cello. Additional musicians and artists are engaged as the repertoire demands.

== Collaborations ==
As of 2026, Radius Ensemble is an Artistic Partner at the Massachusetts Institute of Technology in Cambridge, MA. The group presents their four-concert subscription series in MIT’s new Thomas Tull Concert Hall. In addition, the group performs student compositions for both music theory and composition classes. MIT affiliates are admitted to Radius concerts for free.

From 2011 to 2026, Radius served as the Ensemble in Residence at the Longy School of Music, where they presented their subscription concerts and read student compositions, choosing one for inclusion on a subscription concert as part of the Pappalardo Composition Competition.

Starting 2017, Radius partnered with Cambridge Rindge and Latin School, their local public high school, where they offer chamber music mentoring and open rehearsals, as well as free tickets for students and their families.

Radius Ensemble regularly collaborates with living composers, having commissioned and premiered more than fifty new works by Boston composers, with an emphasis on the work of women composers. Some of these collaborations include Elena Ruehr, John Harbison, Jonathan Bailey Holland, Laurie San Martin, Curtis K Hughes, Marti Epstein, and more.

Radius also frequently brings in guest members and soloists for performances including Dalit Warshaw on theremin; public radio personalities Robin Young and Christopher Lydon as narrators; dancers from Ultimate Tango; and filmmaker Christine Southworth.

== Recordings ==
Radius Ensemble’s self-produced debut CD, Fresh Paint, was released 2015 and features four world premiere commissions by Boston composers Elena Ruehr, Jonathan Bailey Holland, Eun Young Lee, and John Harbison. Their next album, released in 2026 and titled Carnival, features three world premiere commissions by Ruehr and can be purchased or streamed on Bandcamp. Radius also has a large presence on their YouTube channel, where dozens of concert recordings and premiers can be found.

== Media Reviews ==
Radius Ensemble has received positive reviews and accolades over its more than two decades history from The Arts Fuse , , , Boston Classical Review , Boston Globe , , , Harvard Magazine , The Boston Musical Intelligencer , and more. In 2016 Radius Ensemble was named Boston’s Best Classical Ensemble by the now-defunct The Improper Bostonian .
