= Laurie San Martin =

American composer (born 1968)

- Born: 1968 (age 57–58); Oakland, California, U.S.
- Occupation: Composer
- Employer: University of California, Davis
- Awards: Guggenheim Fellowship (2016)

Academic background
- Education: University of California, Davis; Brandeis University
- Thesis: Compositional devices: How melodic and harmonic elements function to achieve a large-scale dramatic structure in the first movement of Andrew Imbrie's "Spring Fever" (2003)
- Doctoral advisor: Martin Boykan
- Musical career
- Genre: Chamber music

Laurie Ann San Martin (born 1968) is an American composer. She is a 2016 Guggenheim Fellow and is a professor of music at University of California, Davis.

== Biography ==
San Martin was born in 1968 in Oakland, California. Originally learning violin through the Suzuki method as a toddler, she later started playing the clarinet as a young child, eventually making it her primary instrument. She obtained her BA in music in 1991 from University of California, Davis, where she was one of the last students of Richard Swift before his retirement.

In 1999, she was awarded a MacDowell Colony Fellowship. She was awarded an American Academy of Arts and Letters Charles Ives Scholarship in 2000. In 2003, she obtained her PhD in theory and composition at Brandeis University; her doctoral dissertation Compositional devices: How melodic and harmonic elements function to achieve a large-scale dramatic structure in the first movement of Andrew Imbrie's "Spring Fever" was supervised by Martin Boykan.

In April 2010, her piece Two Pieces for Piano and Percussion was performed at a Louis Karchin premiere at the Kaufman Music Center, performed by the Washington Square Ensemble. In 2011, the American Contemporary Music Ensemble selected her piece Linea Negra, which The New York Times called "fitfully leaping and rolling", to be performed at Joe's Pub.

In 2016, she was awarded a Guggenheim Fellowship. She won the 2018 American Academy of Arts and Letters Andrew Imbrie Award in Music. Her piece Seven Pines premiered at Radius Ensemble's May 2019 concert; Zoë Madonna of the Boston Globe compared it to "a series of alchemical experiments".

In 2003, she worked as an performance instructor at UC Davis' No Barriers summer program. Originally teaching at Clark University, she later returned to UC Davis as a professor of music.

As of 2007, she lived in Woodland, California.
