= Eran Egozy =

- Born: Israel
- Occupations: Co-founder / chief technical officer / VP of engineering, Harmonix
- Instruments: Clarinet, Percussion

Eran Egozy is a chief technical officer and VP of engineering of Harmonix Music Systems, a US company he founded with Alex Rigopulos in 1995. He also works as professor of the practice at MIT.

== Biography ==
Egozy is a native of Israel. He moved to Lexington, Massachusetts, at the age of 12. When he was 15, his parents bought him an Apple II computer, which he programmed to play Beethoven's Ninth Symphony. He earned a Bachelor of Science and Master of Science degrees in electrical engineering and computer science from MIT in 1995, where he worked with electronic music composer Tod Machover at the MIT Media Laboratory. During his stay at MIT, he met Alex Rigopulos, with whom he later co-founded Harmonix, at the MIT Media Lab.

== Career ==
=== Harmonix ===
Immediately after graduating, he co-founded Cambridge, Massachusetts-based Harmonix Music Systems with fellow MIT alumnus Alex Rigopulos. Harmonix is an interactive computer music company specializing in the development of real-time music generating computer programs for the entertainment industry. Currently, Egozy is the chief technical officer at Harmonix. Egozy and Rigopulos were listed in Time magazine's 2008 list of the 100 most influential people for their work on Rock Band.

=== Music ===
Egozy studied clarinet at the New England Conservatory of Music. He has performed with symphonies in the greater Boston area, including the Boston Youth Symphony Orchestras, the MIT Symphony Orchestra, MIT's Chamber Music Society, MIT's Gamelan Galak Tika, and the Newton Symphony Orchestra. While at MIT, he performed several solo recitals. He also performed the Nielsen Clarinet Concerto with the MIT Symphony. Egozy has played with the MIT Chamber Music Society for seven years, and was a founding member of the now-defunct Aurelius Ensemble. He is also credited as a long-time participant in the Apple Hill Chamber Music festival. Egozy is clarinetist for the critically acclaimed Radius Ensemble, based in Cambridge, Massachusetts.

== Ludography ==
Game	Year	Publisher
Rock Band 2	2008	MTV Games
Rock Band	2007	MTV Networks
Guitar Hero Encore: Rocks the 80s	2007	Activision Publishing, Inc.
Phase	2007	MTV Networks
CMT Presents: Karaoke Revolution Country	2006	Konami Digital Entertainment, Inc.
Guitar Hero II	2006	Activision Publishing, Inc.
Guitar Hero	2005	RedOctane, Inc.
Karaoke Revolution Party	2005	Konami Digital Entertainment, Inc.
EyeToy: AntiGrav	2004	SCEA
Karaoke Revolution Volume 2	2004	Konami Digital Entertainment, Inc.
Karaoke Revolution Volume 3	2004	Konami Digital Entertainment, Inc.
Amplitude	2003	Sony Computer Entertainment America, Inc.
Karaoke Revolution	2003	Konami of America, Inc.
Frequency	2001	SCEA
