= Alex Rigopulos =

American chief executive

- Born: Alexander Peter Rigopulos; December 23, 1969 (age 56); North Andover, Massachusetts, U.S.
- Occupations: Co-founder/creative director, Harmonix, musician

Alexander Peter Rigopulos (born December 23, 1969 in North Andover, Massachusetts) is an American video game designer and musician, best known as the former CEO and current creative director of Harmonix Music Systems, a company he founded with Eran Egozy in 1995. He is also a member of the band Newfane with his brother Chris Rigopulos, who is the current COO at Harmonix.

== Career ==
Rigopulos, born in North Andover, Massachusetts, is a graduate of Deerfield Academy along with two other brothers. He graduated with a B.S. in music and theater arts in 1990 and an M.S. in media arts and sciences in 1994 from the Media Lab at MIT. While there, he met Egozy, an electrical engineer, and they discovered ways to create interactive music devices. After they received their degrees, the two formed Harmonix to create music video games such as Frequency and Amplitude, but the company became highly successful with its contributions to both the Guitar Hero and Rock Band series of games, both which used specially designed controllers based on instruments like guitars and drum kits to mimic the playing of numerous rock songs. Rigopulos and Egozy were listed in Time magazine's 2008 list of the 100 most influential people for their work on Rock Band.

In May 2014, amid layoffs at Harmonix, Rigopulos announced that he would step down as CEO, being replaced by Steve Janiak, while he would become the chief creative officer for the company.

Rigopulos personally cites Japanese game designers Masaya Matsuura, Tetsuya Mizuguchi, and Keita Takahashi as some artists that have inspired his work at Harmonix.

In August 2010, Rigopulos joined the advisory board of the AbleGamers Foundation, a nonprofit dedicated to bringing the rich world of digital entertainment to people with disabilities. In September 2015, he joined the advisory board for the crowdfunding platform Fig.

Rigopulos also donated $2,000 to the ScoreHero website, a website used to track Guitar Hero and Rock Band scores. He donated $9600 to the Colbert Super PAC in 2011. He was also one of the highest backers of the Kickstarter campaign for Double Fine Productions' Broken Age, which led to a character named Alex, loosely based on Rigopulos' own image and voiced by Rigopulos, being included in the game. In April 2015, rock band The Warning met their GoFundMe goal thanks in large part to Rigopulos.
