= Hemming =

Hemming may refer to:

== Historic name ==
- King Hemming (d. 812), King of Denmark
- Hemming Halfdansson (d. 837), Danish Viking
- Hemming (count in Frisia), 9th-century Danish ruler in East Frisia
- Hemming (monk), 11th-century monk and compiler of a cartulary
- Bishop Hemming (1338–1366), bishop of Turku
- Hemming Gadh (c. 1450–1520), Swedish priest
- Hemming Gadd (1837–1915), Swedish Army general

== Surname ==
- Alfred Hemming (1895–1920), English military aviator
- Andrew Hemming, English curler and coach
- Arthur Francis Hemming (1893–1964), English entomologist
- Carol Hemming, British make-up artist
- Gary Hemming (1934–1969), American mountaineer
- Geoffrey Hemming (1898–1926), British military aviator
- George Hemming (1868–1930), American baseball pitcher
- Gerry Patrick Hemming (1937–2008), U.S. Marine mercenary and CIA agent
- Ingrid Fuzjko Hemming (born 1934), Swedish pianist
- James Hemming (1909–2007), English child psychologist, educationalist and humanist
- John Hemming (explorer) (born 1935), Canadian explorer and author
- John Hemming (politician) (born 1960), English politician
- Lindy Hemming (born 1948), Welsh costume designer
- Nick Hemming (born 1973), English musician
- Nikki Hemming (born 1967), CEO and part owner of Sharman Networks
- Petter Hemming (born 1999), Finnish footballer
- Tyler Hemming (born 1985), Canadian soccer player
- William Hemming (1826–1897), English clergyman and cricketer

== Other uses ==
- Hemming (metalworking), a sheet metal process where the edge is rolled over onto itself
- Hemming (musician), stage name of Candice Martello, American musician
  - Hemming (album), 2015 album
- Hemming (sewing)

== See also ==
- Hamming (disambiguation)
- Heming (disambiguation)
- Hemings, a surname
- Hemmings, a surname
