= Simon Chan =

Simon Chan may refer to:

- Simon W. L. Chan, plant geneticist
- Simon Chan (theologian), Christian theologian
- Simon Chan (director), American music video director
