= Rock Band Reloaded =

2010 video game

- Developer: EA Montreal
- Publisher: EA Mobile
- Series: Rock Band
- Platform: iOS
- Release: December 2, 2010
- Genre: Rhythm
- Modes: Single-player, multiplayer

Rock Band Reloaded was a 2010 rhythm game developed by EA Montreal and published by EA Mobile for the iOS. Part of the Rock Band series, it is third game in the series to be released for mobile devices, following Rock Band Mobile (2009) and Rock Band (2009).

Gameplay was similar to other Rock Band series games, but controlled without instrument controllers, and instead with the iOS-device's multi-touch display, microphone, and built-in accelerometer. The game featured multiplayer support over Bluetooth and local Wi-Fi. A total of thirty songs appeared in the game, and extra songs are available as purchasable downloadable content. The game was delisted on July 31, 2012 due to the licensing agreement between EA and Harmonix expired and wasn't renewed.

== Gameplay ==
Rock Band Reloaded uses many gameplay features found in previous games. As before, the player has a choice between Guitar, Bass, Drums, and Vocals on four different difficulties (Easy, Normal, Hard and Expert). Main gameplay includes hitting scrolling notes as they come toward the player. In addition to the standard quickplay, the game has a tour mode as well, allowing the player to venture from city to city and perform concerts. However, unlike its predecessor, Rock Band Reloaded comes with a new vocal recognition mode, effectively duplicating the microphone found in console versions of the game. The game also features a multiplayer mode, and the ability to connect with Facebook to see your friends' scores and post achievements.

"EA's licensing agreement with Harmonix ended and as a result, EA discontinued downloads of Rock Band iOS and Rock Band Reloaded iOS on the App Store. If you own a Rock Band game on your iOS device, you can play it, but you cannot purchase new songs after July 31, 2012. You can access your previously purchased songs."

== Soundtrack ==
=== Included playlist ===
Song title	Artist	Decade	Genre
"A-Punk"	Vampire Weekend	2000s	Rock
"Bodies"	Drowning Pool	2000s	Nu-Metal
"Call Me When You're Sober"	Evanescence	2000s	Nu-Metal
"Heartbreaker"	Pat Benatar	1970s	Classic Rock
"Hella Good"	No Doubt	2000s	Pop/Rock
"Hungry Like the Wolf"	Duran Duran	1980s	Pop/Rock
"In Bloom"	Nirvana	1990s	Grunge
"Kryptonite"	3 Doors Down	2000s	Rock
"Peace Sells"	Megadeth	1980s	Metal
"Remedy"	Seether	2000s	Metal
"Rock'n Me"	Steve Miller Band	1970s	Classic Rock
"So What'cha Want"	Beastie Boys	1990s	Rock
"The Perfect Drug"	Nine Inch Nails	1990s	Rock
"White Wedding (Part 1)"	Billy Idol	1980s	Rock
"Your Decision"	Alice in Chains	2000s	Grunge

=== Free downloads ===
Song title	Artist	Decade	Genre
"Day Late, Dollar Short"	The Acro-Brats	2000s	Rock
"Blood Doll"	Anarchy Club	2000s	Metal
"Get Clean"	Anarchy Club	2000s	Metal
"Night Lies"	Bang Camaro	2000s	Rock
"Pleasure (Pleasure)"	Bang Camaro	2000s	Rock
"Whatever Happened To You"	Cate Sparks	2000s	Pop/Rock
"Can't Let Go"	Death of the Cool	2000s	Rock
"I Get By"	Honest Bob and the Factory-to-Dealer Incentives	2000s	Indie Rock
"Entangled"	Honest Bob and the Factory-to-Dealer Incentives	2000s	Indie Rock
"Am I Crazy"	Little Fish	2010s	Indie Rock
"A Jagged Gorgeous Winter"	The Main Drag	2000s	Indie Rock
"Megasus"	Megasus	2000s	Metal
"Wake Up"	MeTalkPretty	2000s	Indie Rock
"Dearest (I'm So Sorry)"	Picture Me Broken	2000s	Indie Rock
"Seven"	Tijuana Sweetheart	2000s	Indie Rock
"Disengage"	Suicide Silence	2000s	Metal
"Outside"	Tribe	1990s	Rock

=== Premium downloads ===
Song title	Artist	Decade	Genre
"Dirty Little Secret"	The All American Rejects	2000s	Rock
"Real World"	The All American Rejects	2000s	Rock
"Christmas Is The Time To Say I Love You"	Billy Squier	1980s	Rock
"What's My Age Again"	Blink-182	1990s	Punk
"Adam's Song"	Blink-182	2000s	Punk
"Drunken Lullabies"	Flogging Molly	2000s	Punk
"Requiem For A Dying Song"	Flogging Molly	2000s	Punk
"Underneath It All"	No Doubt	2000s	Pop
"Don't Speak"	No Doubt	1990s	Rock
"Blue Christmas"	The Pretenders	1980s	Rock
"Mean Woman Blues"	Roy Orbison	1960s	Rock
"You Got It"	Roy Orbison	1980s	Rock
"Never Let You Go '09"	Third Eye Blind	2000s	Rock
"Semi-Charmed Life '09"	Third Eye Blind	2000s	Rock

== Reception ==
Rock Band Reloaded received mostly positive reviews, scoring a 7.5 on IGN.
