= Eight Songs =

Eight Songs may refer to:

== Music ==
- Eight Songs, Op. 47 (1893), by Edward Alexander MacDowell
- Eight Songs, Op. 57 (1909), compositions by Jean Sibelius
- 8 Songs, an EP version of Melvins! (album) by the Melvins

== See also ==
- Eight Lust Songs (2007), by Michael Nyman
- Eight Songs for a Mad King, a 1969 composition by Peter Maxwell Davies
- Eight Songs for Greg Sage and the Wipers, a 1993 album by various artists
- 8 Songs About a Girl, a 2011 album by Deep Dark Robot
