= Hemmings =

Hemmings is a surname, and may refer to:

- Anita Florence Hemmings (1872–1960), African American librarian from Boston
- David Hemmings (1941–2003), British actor, director, producer
- Deon Hemmings (born 1968), former female 400 meters hurdler
- Eddie Hemmings (cricketer) (born 1949), former British cricketer
- Eddie Hemmings (rugby league), English rugby commentator
- Fred Hemmings (born 1946), American surfer, author
- Guy Hemmings (born 1962), Canadian curler
- Jessica Hemmings, British academic and writer
- Luke Hemmings (born 1996), Australian, member of the pop band, 5 Seconds of Summer
- Myra Hemmings (1895–1968), American actress and educator
- Nolan Hemmings (born 1970), British actor
- Tony Hemmings (born 1967), English footballer
- Trevor Hemmings (1935–2021), British billionaire business person

== Other ==
- Hemmings Motor News, a publication founded by Ernest Hemmings

== See also ==
- Hemming (disambiguation)
- Hemings
