= Darling Dear =

Darling Dear may refer to:

- "Darling Dear", single by The Counts
- Darling Dear (The Miracles song), the B-side to "Point It Out"
- Darling Dear (EP), an EP by Little Fish
- Darling Dear, a song by The Jackson 5 from their album Third Album

== See also ==
- Dear Darling (disambiguation)
