= Baffled and Beat =

Studio album by Little Fish
- Released: 16 August 2010
- Recorded: 2008–2010
- Genre: Alternative rock, Garage rock
- Label: Custard Records, Universal Motown
- Producer: Linda Perry

Little Fish chronology
| Darling Dear (2009) | Baffled and Beat (2010) |

Singles from Baffled and Beat
- 1. "Am I Crazy" Released: 6 May 2010

Baffled and Beat is the debut album from the Oxford, UK alternative rock band Little Fish. After several delays, having been initially set to be released in February 2010, it was finally released on 16 August 2010.

Three tracks from the album; "Am I Crazy", "Darling Dear", and "Bang Bang", are featured as downloadable content in Rock Band, with "Am I Crazy" being a free track, and the other two being sold for half the normal price.

== Track listing ==
All songs written and composed by Little Fish, except where noted.

| No. | Title | Writer(s) | Length |
|---|---|---|---|
| 1. | "Darling Dear" | | 4:03 |
| 2. | "Bang Bang" | | 2:59 |
| 3. | "Am I Crazy" | Little Fish, Nick Feldman | 4:20 |
| 4. | "Heroin Dance" | | 3:30 |
| 5. | "Sweat N Shiver" | Little Fish, Feldman | 3:28 |
| 6. | "Baffled and Beat" | | 2:40 |
| 7. | "You, Me and the TV" | | 3:43 |
| 8. | "Die Young" | | 3:57 |
| 9. | "Luck's Run Out" | | 2:40 |
| 10. | "Whiplash" | Little Fish, Feldman | 2:52 |
| 11. | "Hallelujah" | | 3:05 |
| 12. | "Sorry State" | | 3:16 |

== Personnel ==
- Julia "Juju" Sophie – vocals, lead guitar
- Neil "Nez" Greenaway – drums
- Paul Ill – Bass on tracks 1, 3, 4, 5, 8, 9, 10, and 11
- Linda Perry – Bass on tracks 2, 6, and 12. Hammond B3 on tracks 1, 4, 5, 7, 8, 9, and 12. Wurlitzer on tracks 8 and 9. Lap steel guitar on tracks 5, 7, and 12.
- Thomas Aiezza – Background vocals on track 1.
- Richard Butchins – Background vocals on track 11.
- Ed Richardson – A&R Management Universal Motown
