= Rock Band (iOS) =

2009 video game

- Developer: EA Montreal
- Publisher: EA Mobile
- Series: Rock Band
- Platform: iOS
- Release: October 19, 2009
- Genre: Rhythm
- Modes: Single-player, multiplayer

Rock Band was a 2009 rhythm game developed by EA Montreal and published by EA Mobile for iOS. Part of the Rock Band series, it is second game in the series to be released for mobile devices, following Rock Band Mobile (2009). The game was released through the App Store in several regions on October 19, 2009.

Gameplay was similar to other Rock Band series games, but controlled without instrument controllers, and instead with the iOS-device's multi-touch display, microphone, and built-in accelerometer. The game featured multiplayer support over Bluetooth, and online play via Facebook Connect.

A total of twenty songs appeared in the game, and extra songs were available as purchasable downloadable content.

On July 31, 2012, due to an expiring contract with Rock Band main developer Harmonix, the game was removed from the App Store.

== Gameplay ==
Gameplay is similar to that of previous games in the Rock Band series, as the player has a choice to play either lead, bass guitar, drums, or vocals with up to three other players locally via an ad hoc Bluetooth network. The game also features asynchronous multiplayer gameplay through Facebook Connect, which allows players to synchronize progress in a song with others over the internet using a cellular data connection or Wi-Fi. Simultaneous multiplayer gameplay is not available on the original iPhone and iPod Touch devices due to technical limitations of the iPhone OS.

In place of instrument controllers as used in most other games of the series, Rock Band must be controlled using a combination of the iPhone or iPod Touch device's built-in multi-touch display and accelerometer. While vocal gameplay has traditionally been done using a microphone in conjunction with a player literally singing words in pitch, the game uses only rhythmic touch input. During each song, each player attempts to match notes as they scroll on-screen in time with the current song. Completing consecutive series of notes will build up a player's scoring multiplier and add to the band's score for the song. Certain phrases of notes will be marked as glowing notes; successfully completing these add to the player's "Overdrive" meter. When the Overdrive meter is at least half-full, a player can activate Overdrive to double the band's scoring multiplier. It is activated by jolting the iOS device, whereas force feedback is produced by the device to confirm activation. Players are rewarded with up to 5 stars for completing a song based on their scoring performance. Three skill levels are available in Rock Band, and are known as "Easy", "Medium", and "Hard".

The game features two main single-player modes known as "Quick Play" and "World Tour". In World Tour mode, a player performs a set list in five in-game world cities: Boston, New York, Seattle, Paris and Moscow. After completing a set list in one city, a player unlocks more songs that are playable in the next city. In Quick Play mode, players simply access songs that have been previously unlocked in World Tour mode.

== Soundtrack ==
There are twenty songs available by default on Rock Band. Players are able to download additional songs in the in-game "Music Store", which is available using Wi-Fi or a cellular data connection to the internet. These songs were either on previous Rock Band games or Downloadable Content.

Song title	Artist	Decade	Genre
"Ace of Spades '08"	Motörhead	1980s	Metal
"All the Small Things"	Blink-182	2000s	Pop/Rock
"Attack"	Thirty Seconds to Mars	2000s	Rock
"Bad Reputation"	Joan Jett	1980s	Rock
"Bad to the Bone"	George Thorogood & the Destroyers	1980s	Rock
"Cherub Rock"	Smashing Pumpkins	1990s	Alternative
"Debaser"	Pixies	1990s	Alternative
"Everlong"	Foo Fighters	1990s	Alternative
"Girl's Not Grey"	AFI	2000s	Alternative
"Give It All"	Rise Against	2000s	Punk
"Hanging on the Telephone"	Blondie	1980s	Pop/Rock
"Hymn 43"	Jethro Tull	1970s	Progressive
"Ladybug"	The Presidents of the United States of America	2000s	Alternative
"Lazy Eye"	Silversun Pickups	2000s	Alternative
"Learn to Fly"	Foo Fighters	1990s	Alternative
"Move Along"	All-American Rejects	2000s	Pop/Rock
"Sabotage"	Beastie Boys	1990s	Rock
"Simple Man"	Lynyrd Skynyrd	1970s	Southern Rock
"Take the Money and Run"	Steve Miller Band	1970s	Classic Rock
"We Got the Beat"	The Go-Go's	1980s	Pop/Rock

=== Downloadable songs ===
Song title	Artist	Free
"Message in a Bottle"	The Police	No
"Roxanne"	The Police	No
"Bring Me To Life"	Evanescence	No
"Best of Me"	Morningwood	No
"Just Breathe"	Pearl Jam	No
"The Fixer"	Pearl Jam	No
"Entangled"	Honest Bob and the Factory-to-Dealer Incentives	Yes
"I Get By"	Honest Bob and the Factory-to-Dealer Incentives	Yes
"Joker and the Thief"	Wolfmother	No
"White Unicorn"	Wolfmother	No
"Just a Girl"	No Doubt	No
"Spiderwebs"	No Doubt	No
"A Jagged Gorgeous Winter"	The Main Drag	Yes
"Can't Let Go"	Death of The Cool	Yes
"Buddy Holly"	Weezer	No
"Say It Ain't So"	Weezer	No
"Night Lies"	Bang Camaro	Yes
"Pleasure (Pleasure)"	Bang Camaro	Yes
"Blood Doll"	Anarchy Club	Yes
"Get Clean"	Anarchy Club	Yes
"Science Genius Girl"	Freezepop	Yes
"Super-Sprode"	Freezepop	Yes
"Funk#49"	The James Gang	No
"Let Love Rule"	Lenny Kravitz	No
"I Was Wrong"	Social Distortion	No
"Girl U Want"	Devo	No
"The Kill"	Thirty Seconds to Mars	No
"Here It Goes Again"	OK Go	No
"This Is A Call"	Foo Fighters	No
"It Hurts"	Angels & Airwaves	No
"Today"	Smashing Pumpkins	No
"Zero"	Smashing Pumpkins	No

== Reception ==
Reception

Review scores
Publication	Score
IGN	7.0/10.0
Slide to Play	4/4
TouchArcade	4/5

Rock Band received mixed reviews from critics. Common criticisms by reviewers consisted of the lack of ability to sing vocals such as in the console counterparts of the game, and the limited soundtrack out of the box.

== Sequel ==
Rock Band Reloaded was released for the iPhone/iPod Touch and iPad on December 2, 2010.
