= Heming =

Heming may refer to:

- Heming (company), a British jewellery company founded in 1745
- Héming, a commune in Lorraine, France
- IL Heming, a Norwegian sports club
- Michael Heming (1920–1942), British composer
- Rob Heming (1932–2023), Australian rugby union player

== See also ==
- Hemings, a surname
- Hemming (disambiguation)
