= Dear Darling =

Dear Darling may refer to:

- "Dear Darling", song by Asami Imai
- "Dear Darling", song by Mary Margaret O'Hara from Miss America (later covered by The Walkabouts for Satisfied Mind)
- "Dear Darling (I Won't Be Comin' Home)", song by Ronnie James Dio
- "Dear Darling (I'll Be There)", song Dennis DeYoung from Desert Moon

== See also ==
- "Dear Darlin'", song by Olly Murs
- Darling Dear (disambiguation)
