= Crash Kings =

American rock band

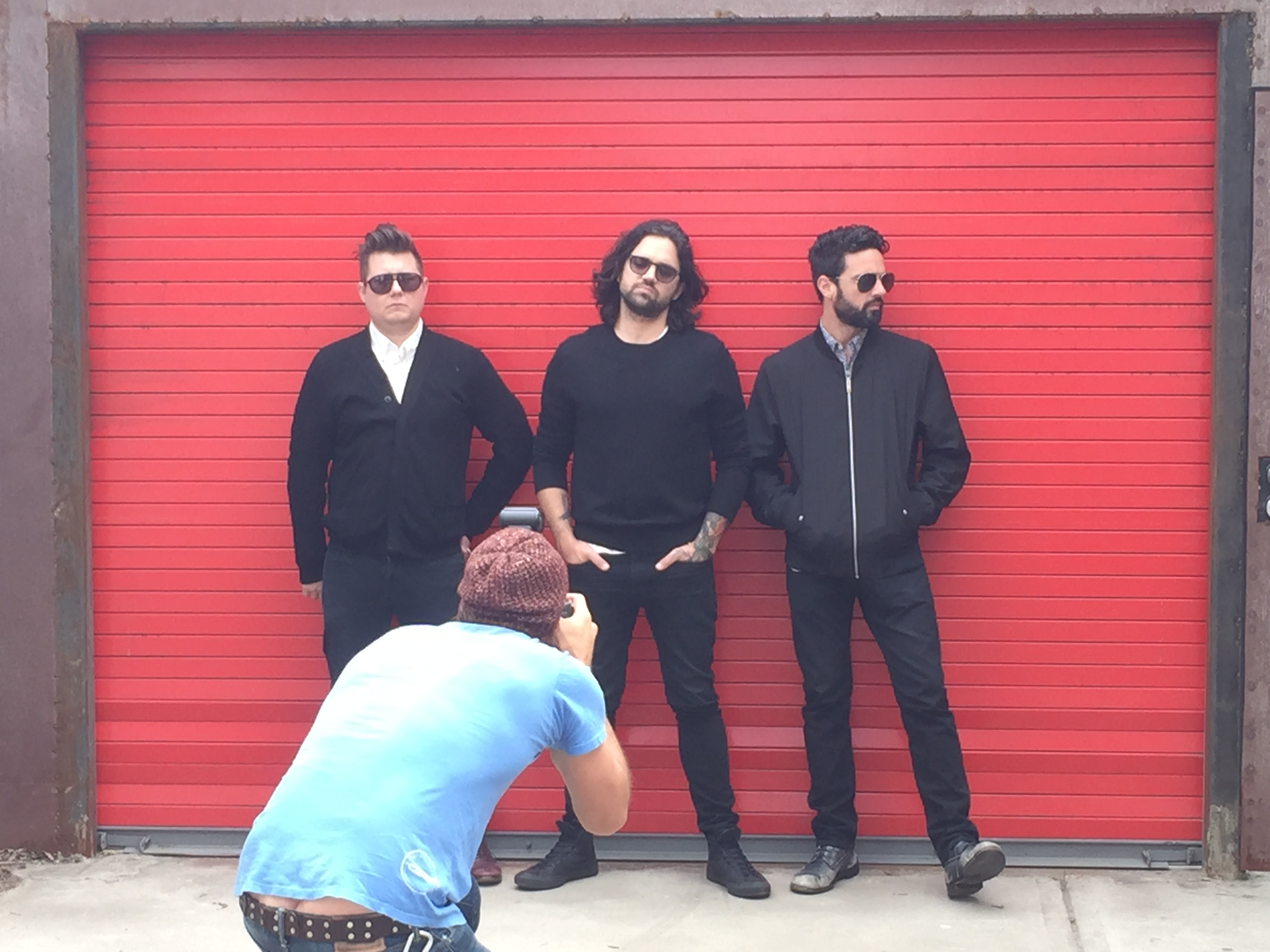
- Crash Kings in 2015

Background information
- Origin: Los Angeles, California, US
- Genres: Alternative rock; indie rock; hard rock
- Years active: 2006–present
- Labels: Custard; Universal Motown; Universal Republic; Republic
- Members: Antonio Beliveau; Mike Beliveau; Tom Roslak
- Past members: Jason Morris

Crash Kings is an American rock band formed in Los Angeles, California in 2006. The members are vocalist–keyboardist Antonio "Tony" Beliveau, his brother, bassist Mike Beliveau, and drummer Tom Roslak. The band's debut album, Crash Kings, was released May 26, 2009, on Custard/Universal Motown. The first single, "Mountain Man", came out on U.S. modern rock radio stations in October and entered Billboard's Alternative Songs chart the following month. It reached no. 1 on the Billboard Alternative Radio charts in March 2010. The band is known for using analog keyboards, such as the clavinet, with distortion effects and a whammy bar, in place of a typical lead guitar.

== History ==
Brothers Mike and Tony Beliveau grew up in Andover, Massachusetts, a suburban city north of Boston. Tony started playing piano by age six, and began to write music during middle school. After high school, he briefly studied jazz piano at the University of North Texas before deciding to return to Boston and ultimately attend the Berklee College of Music, where younger brother Mike was already a student. After Berklee and relocating to Los Angeles, Tony sent Mike (who had relocated to New York) some recorded tracks he had been working on. Impressed with the tracks and Tony's singing, Mike packed up and moved to LA a week later.

A few months after the band's formation, Crash Kings drew the attention of songwriter and record producer Linda Perry, who met with Tony and signed the group to her label, Custard Records.

After the band performed for Sylvia Rhone, president of Universal Music Group's Motown Records, Crash Kings were directed to Dave Sardy, who produced the band's eponymous debut album for Custard/Universal Motown. Released on May 26, 2009, it reached number 30 on Billboard's U.S. Top Heatseekers albums chart. The album's first single, "Mountain Man", entered the Billboard Alternative Songs chart in November and peaked at #1 on March 28, 2010.

The band has toured with such artists as Chris Cornell,Anberlin, Stone Temple Pilots,David Cook, Jet, The Bravery, Mason Jennings, and Rooney.

In June 2013, Crash Kings released a second album, titled Dark of the Daylight.

== Band members ==
- Antonio Beliveau – lead vocals, piano, clavinet, keyboards
- Mike Beliveau – bass, backing vocals
- Tom Roslak – drums, percussion

== Discography ==
=== Studio albums ===
Year	Album details	Peak chart positions
Year	Album details	U.S. Heat
2009	Crash Kings: Release date: May 26, 2009; Label: Custard/Universal Motown	25
2013	Dark of the Daylight: Release date: June 18, 2013; Label: Custard/Universal Motown	17

=== Singles ===
Year	Single	Peak chart positions						Album
Year	Single	U.S. Alt	U.S. Main. Rock	U.S. Rock	CAN	CAN Alt	CAN Rock	Album
2009	"Mountain Man"	1	32	13	54	2	2	Crash Kings
2010	"You Got Me"	19	—	48	—	—	—	Crash Kings
2010	"Non-Believer"	—	—	—	—	—	—	Crash Kings
2013	"Hot Fire"	—	30	—	—	—	—	Dark of the Daylight
