= Darling Dear (EP) =

EP by Little Fish
- Released: 9 October 2009
- Recorded: 2008–2009
- Genre: Alternative rock, garage rock
- Label: Custard Records
- Producer: Linda Perry

Little Fish chronology
Darling Dear (2009)	Baffled and Beat (2010)

Darling Dear is an EP from the Oxford, UK alternative rock band Little Fish. It was released on 9 October 2009

The track "Darling Dear" is featured as downloadable content in Rock Band.

== Track listing ==
No.	Title	Length
1.	"Darling Dear"	4:03
2.	"Sweat N Shiver"	3:28
3.	"Whiplash"	2:52

== Personnel ==
- Julia "Juju" Sophie: vocals, lead guitar
- Neil "Nez" Greenaway: drums
