= Crash Kings (album) =

Studio album by The Crash Kings
- Released: May 26, 2009
- Genre: Alternative rock, indie rock, hard rock
- Length: 36:23
- Label: Custard/Universal Motown
- Producer: Dave Sardy

Crash Kings is the debut album by American rock band Crash Kings. Produced by Dave Sardy and released in May 2009, the album features the single "Mountain Man", which reached number 1 on the Alternative Songs chart in early 2010.

== Reception ==
Professional ratings
Review scores
Source	Rating
Allmusic	3/5 stars
Alternative Addiction	4/5 stars

The album entered the Billboard Top Heatseekers chart in June 2009 and reached its peak position of number 30 in May 2010.

Allmusic writer Stephen Thomas Erlewine compared the band's musical style as something between The White Stripes and Ben Folds Five, and remarked that the band leaned

a bit too heavily on the Folds part of the equation, loving his pounding eighth notes and clever-clever wit.

Erlewine added that Crash Kings are most intriguing

...when they get loud, as they do on '14 Arms', or when they mimic the Whites' thud and caterwaul as they do on 'You Got Me' -- because that's when they don't seem like another politely pressed and pleasant piano pop band.

== Track listing ==
All tracks are written by Crash Kings.

No.	Title	Length
1.	"Mountain Man"	3:17
2.	"1985"	3:42
3.	"It's Only Wednesday"	3:04
4.	"Come Away"	4:02
5.	"Non-Believer"	3:51
6.	"14 Arms"	2:44
7.	"Raincoat"	3:57
8.	"You Got Me"	4:35
9.	"Saving Grace"	3:32
10.	"My Love"	3:39
Total length:		36:23

== Personnel ==
=== Crash Kings ===
- Antonio Beliveau – Lead Vocals, Piano, Keyboard
- Michael Beliveau – Bass
- Jason Morris – Drums

=== Additional musicians ===
- Philip Vaiman – violin
- Alyssa Park – violin
- Armen Garabedian – violin
- J. Barrera – piano
- Timothy Loo – cello

=== Design ===
- Josh Mongeau – art design
- Jim Wright – photography

=== Production ===
- Dave Sardy – producer, mixing engineer
- Daniel Field – management
- Kelly Perkins – management
- Stephen Marcussen – mastering
- Ed Richardson: A&R Management Universal Motown
- Ryan Castle – engineer
- Cameron Barton – 2nd engineer
- Andy Brohard – Pro Tools engineer
- Alec Gomez – assistant
- Morgan Stratton – assistant
- David Campbell – arranger and conductor on "Come Away"
- Charlie Bisharat – concertmaster on "Come Away"

== Chart performance ==
Chart (2010)	Peak position
U.S. Billboard Top Heatseekers	25
