= Little Fish (band) =

British band

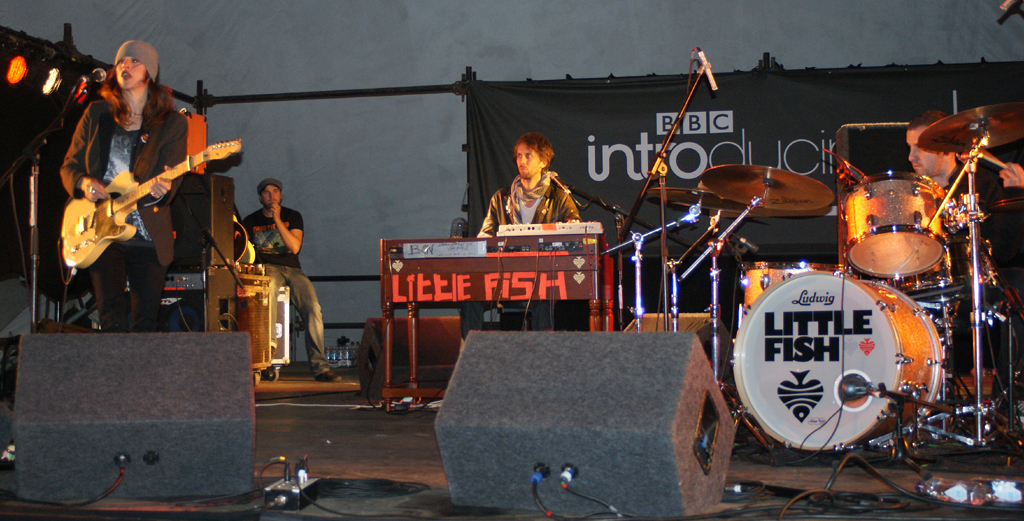
- Little Fish performing on the BBC Introducing Stage at the Leeds Festival in 2010.

Background information
- Origin: Oxford, United Kingdom
- Genres: Garage rock, alternative rock
- Years active: 2006–2012
- Labels: Custard, Universal Motown, Island
- Past members: Juju Sophie; Neil Greenaway; Ben Walker; Elisa Zoot; Mike Monaghan
- Website: littlefishmusic.com

Little Fish was a British garage rock band from Oxford, United Kingdom, formed in 2006 by vocalist and guitarist Julia "Juju" Sophie Heslop and drummer Neil "Nez" Greenaway.

Little Fish released one studio album – Baffled and Beat (2010) and a series of EPs.

== History ==
After playing numerous shows in the UK throughout 2007, including an appearance at Glastonbury Festival, they were signed to Custard Records in 2008 and began work on their debut album with label owner and producer Linda Perry as well as playing a show at the Viper Room, in Los Angeles, California. They went on to support Supergrass on their European tour.

In 2009, they toured with Spinnerette, Eagles of Death Metal, Juliette Lewis and Alice in Chains. In 2010, they played a show with Courtney Love's group, Hole, in London at the O2 Shepherd's Bush Empire as well as their own headlining tour in March 2010. The band announced, via Twitter, that they are supporting Them Crooked Vultures on 22 March 2010 at the Royal Albert Hall in aid of The Teenage Cancer Trust.

Between 9 and 30 June 2010 the band played a fourteen date tour supporting Blondie. They also played the Red Bull Bedroom Jam Stage at the Sonisphere Festival in Knebworth, UK on Saturday 31 July.

The group's debut album, titled Baffled and Beat, was released on 16 August 2010.

Three of the band's tracks; "Am I Crazy", "Darling Dear", and "Bang Bang", are featured as downloadable content in Rock Band, with "Am I Crazy" being a free track, and the other two being sold for half the normal price.

Little Fish left Custard Records/Universal USA at the end of 2010 to begin recording a new album produced by fellow Oxford musician Gaz Coombes formerly of Supergrass. On 17 December 2012 Little Fish played their last show at the Rotunda in Oxford.

Juju and Ben went on to start a new band called Candy Says in January 2013, and are recording a second album in their garage with the help of their original producer, Rich Aitken.

== Band members ==
- Julia "Juju" Sophie Heslop – vocals, lead guitar
- Neil "Nez" Greenaway – drums, percussion (2006–2011)
- Ben Walker – organ (2010–2012)
- Elisa Zoot – vocals, percussion (2012)
- Mike Monaghan – drums (2012)

== Discography ==
Studio albums

- Baffled and Beat (2010)

EPs

- Darling Dear (2009)
- Fish Bowl Sessions (2011)
- Garage Sessions Vol. II (2012)

Singles

- "Am I Crazy" (2010)
- "Whiplash" (2010)
- "Wonderful" (2011)
