= Deep Dark Robot =

American rock band

- Origin: Los Angeles, California, United States
- Genres: Post-grunge; punk blues
- Years active: 2010–present
- Labels: Custard
- Members: Linda Perry; Tony Tornay

Deep Dark Robot is an American rock band from Los Angeles, California, formed in 2010. The band consists of Linda Perry (lead vocals, guitars, bass guitar, keyboards) and Tony Tornay (drums, percussion).

== Critical reception ==
The project's single album, 8 Songs About a Girl, received mixed reviews from critics. Some panned Perry's vocals as too inconsistent and, at times, contrived. Others saw the duo as unrefined, but honest and promising. The album was also noted from its divergence from Perry's typical musical styles.

== Discography ==
8 Songs About a Girl

Studio album by Deep Dark Robot
- Released: March 22, 2011
- Recorded: 2010 at Kung Fu Gardens, North Hollywood, California
- Genre: Post-grunge; punk blues
- Length: 35:25
- Label: Custard
- Producer: Linda Perry

Linda Perry chronology
After Hours (1999)	8 Songs About a Girl (2011)

=== 8 Songs About a Girl ===
All lyrics are written by Linda Perry; all music is composed by Linda Perry and Tony Tornay.

No.	Title	Length
1.	"I'm Coming for You!"	4:14
2.	"No One Wakes Me Up Like You"	5:10
3.	"Can't Getcha Out of My Mind"	4:23
4.	"You Mean Nothing to Me"	4:36
5.	"It Fucking Hurts"	4:11
6.	"Won't You Be My Girl?"	3:16
7.	"Speck"	6:03
8.	"Fuck You, Stupid Bitch"	3:38
Total length:		35:25

iTunes bonus tracks
No.	Title	Length
9.	"Somebody Love Me Now"	4:10

Online bonus tracks
No.	Title	Length
10.	"You Got Me (On My Knees)"	4:50
11.	"Down by the Water (PJ Harvey cover)"	4:17

== Music videos ==
Year	Title	Director(s)
2011	Won't You Be My Girl?	Simon Chan
2011	Love Song	Sean Geer
