= Jessica Hemmings =

British academic and writer

- Born: Wales, United Kingdom
- Education: Rhode Island School of Design; University of London; University of Edinburgh
- Occupations: Academic, writer
- Website: www.jessicahemmings.com

Jessica Hemmings is a British writer and academic who writes about textiles and culture.

== Early life ==
Born in Wales, Jessica Hemmings spent her childhood in Indonesia and the United States.

She graduated with a BFA in Textile Design from the Rhode Island School of Design in 1999 and an MA in Comparative Literature from the University of London’s School of Oriental and African Studies in 2000. Her PhD, awarded by the University of Edinburgh in 2006, is published by Kalliope paperbacks under the title, Yvonne Vera: The Voice of Cloth (2008).

== Career ==
Hemmings is a Professor of Craft (2017-present) at the University of Gothenburg, Sweden and Professor II (2024-present) at the Oslo School of Architecture & Design, Norway. Previous academic appointments include Professor of Visual Culture and Head of the School of Visual Culture at the National College of Art & Design, Dublin (2012-2016); Deputy Director of Research and Head of Context, Edinburgh College of Art, University of Edinburgh (2010-2012); Associate Director of the Centre for Visual & Cultural Studies, Edinburgh College of Art (2008-2010); Reader in Textile Culture, Winchester School of Art, University of Southampton, England (2008). She is a member of the editorial boards of TEXTILE: the journal of cloth & culture (Taylor & Francis) and Craft Research (Intellect).

As a writer, she has published Warp and Weft: Woven Textiles in Fashion, Art and Interiors (2012) and Yvonne Vera: The Voice of Cloth (2008), and edited three books. Based on her editorial project Cultural Threads, Hemmings curated Migrations, an international traveling exhibition (2015-2017). The Cultural Threads book inspired Dutch curator Liza Swaving's exhibition of the same name held at the TextielMuseum, Tilburg, the Netherlands (24 November – 12 May 2019).

== Awards ==
- 2020–2023 Rita Bolland Fellowship at the Research Centre for Material Culture, the Netherlands
- 2025–2027 Carceral Craft: the material of oppression or expression? Swedish Research Council Grant

== Selected lectures ==
Kunstmuseum and Ruhr University Bochum, Germany (2025), Universidad de Sevilla, Spain (2023), Nordic Textile Art Network, Reykjavik, Iceland (2019), Zeitz MOCCA, Cape Town, South Africa (2018), University of British Columbia, Canada (2017), ObjectSpace, New Zealand (2016), Design Canberra Festival, Australia (2015), SOFA Chicago New Voices Lecture (2012), Cranbrook Academy of Art (2012) INIVA, London (2009).

== Books ==
- The Textile Reader (second edition), Bloomsbury (9 February 2023), ISBN 9781350239845
- Cultural Threads: Transnational Textiles Today, Bloomsbury Academic (15 January 2015), ISBN 978-1472524997
- Warp and Weft: Woven Textiles in Fashion, Art and Interiors, A&C Black Visual Arts (6 December 2012), ISBN 978-1408134443
- The Textile Reader, Berg Publishers (13 March 2012), ISBN 978-1847886347
- In the Loop: Knitting Now, Black Dog Press (11 May 2010), ISBN 978-1906155964
- Yvonne Vera: The Voice of Cloth, kalliope paperbacks; 1st Edition (1 January 2008), ISBN 978-3981079852

== Selected Articles ==
- "Made for European Trade by Prisoners in Java: Batik Production in the Women's Prisons of Semarang and Yogyakarta in the Early Twentieth Century" (2025) The Journal of Modern Craft
- "Iris van Herpen: The Body" (2025) TEXTILE: cloth and culture
- "Iris van Herpen: Tools" (2025) TEXTILE: cloth and culture
- "Iris van Herpen: Collaboration" (2025) TEXTILE: cloth and culture
- "Makers Who Move: Solitary Exercise and the Creative Mind" (2024) PARSE
- "Maximum Space Around the Typewriter: Yvonne Vera and the Craft of Writing" (2021) Wasafiri
- "That's Not Your Story: Faith Ringgold Publishing on Cloth" (2020) PARSE
- "Floppy Cloth: Textile Exhibition Strategies Inside the White Cube" (2019) TEXTILE: cloth and culture

== Selected Book Chapters ==
- "Toward a Minor Textile Architecture" (2024) Entangled Histories of Art and Migration (University of Chicago Press & Intellect)
- "Can That Be Taught? Lessons in Embodied Knowledge from Memoir Writing for Craft & Design Education" (2023) Somaesthetics and Design Culture (Brill)
- "Material Scent: textiles beyond touch" (2023) Kinesic Intelligence in the Humanities (Routledge)
- "Textual Agency: pitfalls and potentials" (2020) Design and Agency (Bloomsbury)
- "Knitting after Making: what we do with what we make" (2019) Textiles, Community, Controversy: The Knitting Map
