= Hemming (album) =

Studio album by Hemming
- Released: July 24, 2015
- Recorded: 2015
- Genre: Rock
- Length: 37:32
- Label: Custard Media Inc
- Producer: Linda Perry

Hemming chronology
Hemming (2015)	Waiting/Wasting (2019)

Hemming is the debut studio album by American musician Hemming. It was released on July 24, 2015, in the United States, through Custard Records.

== Critical reception ==
Curve magazine summarized the album as "strong and raw".

== Track listing ==
No.	Title	Length
1.	"Hard On Myself"	4:20
2.	"I'll Never Be The Man For You"	3:39
3.	"Some Of My Friends"	3:06
4.	"Pins And Needles"	3:55
5.	"Paper Crane"	3:10
6.	"Home"	3:00
7.	"Vitamins"	3:13
8.	"Give It Away"	4:55
9.	"Said And Gone"	3:49
10.	"Gone"	4:25
Total length:		37:32
