= Simon W. L. Chan =

New Zealand–born plant geneticist

- Born: 1974; Auckland, New Zealand
- Died: 22 August 2012 (aged 37–38)
- Known for: Centromere-mediated genome elimination and haploid induction in plants
- Scientific career
- Fields: Plant genetics, chromosome biology, epigenetics
- Workplaces: University of California, Davis
- Doctoral advisor: Elizabeth Blackburn

Simon Wai Len Chan (1974 – August 22, 2012) was a New Zealand–born plant geneticist and associate professor of plant biology at the University of California, Davis. His research focused on chromosome biology, centromere function, and epigenetic regulation in plants. Chan is best known for discovering a method of producing haploid plants through centromere-mediated genome elimination, useful in plant breeding.

Chan received international recognition for this work and in 2011 was selected as one of the inaugural investigators in the Howard Hughes Medical Institute–Gordon and Betty Moore Foundation Plant Science Investigator Program.

== Early life and education ==
Chan was born in 1974 in Auckland, New Zealand. He earned a bachelor's degree in biochemistry from the University of Auckland in 1996. He later moved to the United States for graduate study and completed a Ph.D. in cell biology at the University of California, San Francisco in 2002 in the laboratory of Nobel laureate Elizabeth Blackburn, studying telomere biology. During his doctoral research, Chan demonstrated that telomerase and ATM/Tel1p protect telomeres from nonhomologous end joining.

He conducted postdoctoral research at the University of California, Los Angeles in the laboratory of Steven Jacobsen, focusing on RNA-directed DNA methylation and epigenetic gene silencing.

== Career ==
In 2006, Chan joined the faculty of the Department of Plant Biology at the University of California, Davis. His laboratory studied centromere structure and chromosome inheritance using the model plant Arabidopsis thaliana.

Chan's group discovered that modifying the centromeric histone variant CENH3 could cause genome elimination when crossed with wild-type plants. By modifying CENH3 and crossing these plants with wild type, they observed that chromosomes from one parent could be selectively eliminated in the embryo, producing haploid offspring containing only a single parental genome.

The discovery, published in Nature in 2010, provided a new method for generating haploid and doubled-haploid plants used in plant breeding. Subsequent work by Chan and collaborators demonstrated that genetic manipulation of meiosis combined with genome elimination could produce clonal seeds, a step toward engineering apomixis in crops.

Chan's research linked fundamental chromosome biology and applied plant biotechnology, demonstrating that centromere engineering could enable new plant breeding and chromosome engineering approaches.

== Honors and recognition ==
In 2011, Chan was selected as one of the first HHMI–Gordon and Betty Moore Foundation Investigators, a program designed to support research in plant biology.

He was granted tenure and promoted to associate professor at UC Davis in June 2012.

In 2017, Selwyn College in Auckland established the Simon Chan Science Scholarship in his memory. The scholarship supports a graduating student pursuing university studies in science.

== Personal life and death ==
Chan died on August 22, 2012 at the age of 38 from complications related to primary sclerosing cholangitis while awaiting a liver transplant.

Outside of his scientific work, Chan was an amateur musician who played several instruments, including saxophone, ukulele, and bass guitar, and occasionally performed with a band composed of colleagues at UC Davis.

He was also known among colleagues for his interest in food and restaurants and for exploring new cuisines.

== Selected publications ==
- Ravi, M.; Chan, S. W. (2010). "Haploid plants produced by centromere-mediated genome elimination". Nature. 464 (7288): 615–618. doi:10.1038/nature08842. PMID 20336146.
- Marimuthu, M. P. A.; Jolivet, S.; Ravi, M.; Pereira, L.; Davda, J. N.; Cromer, L.; Wang, L.; Nogué, F.; Chan, S. W. L.; Siddiqi, I.; Mercier, R. (2011). "Synthetic clonal reproduction through seeds". Science. 331 (6019): 876. doi:10.1126/science.1199682. PMID 21330535.
- Chan, S. W.; Blackburn, E. H. (2003). "Telomerase and ATM/Tel1p protect telomeres from nonhomologous end joining". Molecular Cell. 11 (5): 1379–1387. doi:10.1016/S1097-2765(03)00174-6. PMID 12769860.

== See also ==
- Centromere
- Doubled haploidy
