= Simon Chan (director) =

American music video director

Simon Chan (born in New Orleans, Louisiana) is an American music video director.

== Filmography ==
- Almost Sharkproof starring Jon Lovitz (2013)
- Dead Meadow - Three Kings starring Sean Michael Guess (2010)

== Music video filmography ==
- Mature Science - Retox (2013)
- Isis - The Sword (2012)
- Spell Eater - Huntress (2012)
- 8 of Swords - Huntress (2011)
- Creten - Saviours (2011)
- Can't Getcha Out Of My Mind - Deep Dark Robot (2011)
- The Widow - The Mars Volta (2005)
- Counting 5-4-3-2-1 - Thursday (2006)
- Aotkpta - The Locust (2007)
- That Old Temple - Dead Meadow (2009)
- Three Kings - Dead Meadow (2010)
- The Hair Song - Black Mountain (2010)
- Tres Brujas - The Sword (2010)
- Lawless Lands - The Sword (2010)
- Night City - The Sword (2011)
- Confusion Range - Spindrift (2011)
- Won't You Be My Girl? - Deep Dark Robot (2011)
- It Fucking Hurts - Deep Dark Robot (2011)
- Speck - Deep Dark Robot (2011)
