= Hemming (musician) =

American singer-songwriter

- Born: Candice Martello
- Origin: Philadelphia, Pennsylvania, U.S.
- Genres: folk; indie rock; alternative rock
- Occupations: Musician; singer
- Instruments: Vocals; guitar
- Years active: 2014–present
- Label: Custard Media Inc
- Website: www.hemmingmusic.com

Candice Martello, known professionally as Hemming, is an American musician and singer-songwriter. Her solo career was launched via Make or Break: The Linda Perry Project.

== Career ==
Formerly part of the punk duo Omar, she became a solo artist as a contestant on the VH1 reality show Make or Break: The Linda Perry Project at the suggestion of host Linda Perry. She was co-winner of the show, earning a recording contract. She released a self-titled debut album in 2015. That same year, she opened for Chris Cornell on his solo tour.

== Personal life ==
Candice graduated from Drexel University. She is a lesbian, coming out publicly on Make or Break: The Linda Perry Project.

== Discography ==
- Hemming (2015)
- Waiting/Wasting (2019)
