= Custard Records =

American record label

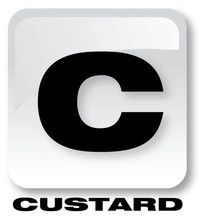
- Parent company: Warner Music Group
- Founder: Linda Perry
- Distributor(s): Atlantic Records
- Genre: Various
- Country of origin: United States

Custard Records is an American record label, best known for its success with English singer-songwriter James Blunt. The label is run by former 4 Non Blondes member Linda Perry and has a partnership with Warner Music Group's Atlantic Records division.

== Roster ==
- Linda Perry
- James Blunt
- Deep Dark Robot
- Ben Jelen
- Bigelf
- Crash Kings
- Hemming
- Little Fish
- Paper Zoo
- Reni Lane
- Sierra Swan
- Sunshine

== Discography ==
=== Albums ===
- James Blunt – Back to Bedlam (2004)
- Linda Perry – In Flight (2005)
- Sunshine – Moonshower and Razorblades (2005)
- Sierra Swan – LadyLand (2006)
- Ben Jelen – Ex-Sensitive (2007)
- James Blunt – All the Lost Souls (2007)
- Bigelf – Hex (2007)
- Ben Jelen – Wreckage EP (2008)
- Bigelf – Cheat The Gallows (2008)
- Crash Kings – Crash Kings (2009)
- Little Fish – Darling Dear EP (2009)
- Reni Lane – Reni Lane (2010)
- Little Fish – Baffled and Beat (2010)
- James Blunt – Some Kind of Trouble (2010)
- Deep Dark Robot – 8 Songs About A Girl (2011)
- James Blunt – Moon Landing (2013)
- Hemming – Hemming (2015)

== See also ==
- List of record labels
