= Hemings =

Hemings is a surname, and may refer to:

American slavery

- Hemings family
- Elizabeth "Betty" Hemings (1735–1807), enslaved American
- Sally Hemings (1773–1835), enslaved by US president Thomas Jefferson who allegedly bore him 6 children
- Mary Hemings (1753-after 1834), American, ex-slave
- Martin Hemings (1755-after 1795), American, enslaved butler to Thomas Jefferson
- John Hemings (1776–1833), American, ex-slave
- Beverly Hemings (1798-1873), American, ex-slave, son of ex-slave Sally Hemings
- Madison Hemings (1805–1877), son of ex-slave Sally Hemings
- Harriet Hemings (1801–1870), American, ex-slave
- Eston Hemings (1808–1850), American, ex-slave

== See also ==
- Hemmings
- Heming (disambiguation)
