= Alfred Hemming =

Alfred Stewart Hemming
- Born: 17 August 1895; Banbury, Oxfordshire, England
- Died: 27 December 1920 (aged 25); Cape Town, South Africa
- Military career
- Allegiance: Union of South Africa
- Branch: Royal Air Force
- Rank: Captain
- Unit: No. 41 Squadron RAF
- Awards: Distinguished Flying Cross

Captain Alfred Stewart Hemming DFC (17 August 1895 – 27 December 1920) was an English World War I flying ace credited with eight aerial victories.

Hemming was born in Banbury, Oxfordshire, to William Hemming, a shopkeeper from Banbury, and Alison Hemming, from Yorkshire. After his father's death in 1908, he moved to South Africa, where he attended high school. He was killed in an air crash in Cape Town, South Africa, in 1920.
