= Bang Camaro =

American hard rock band

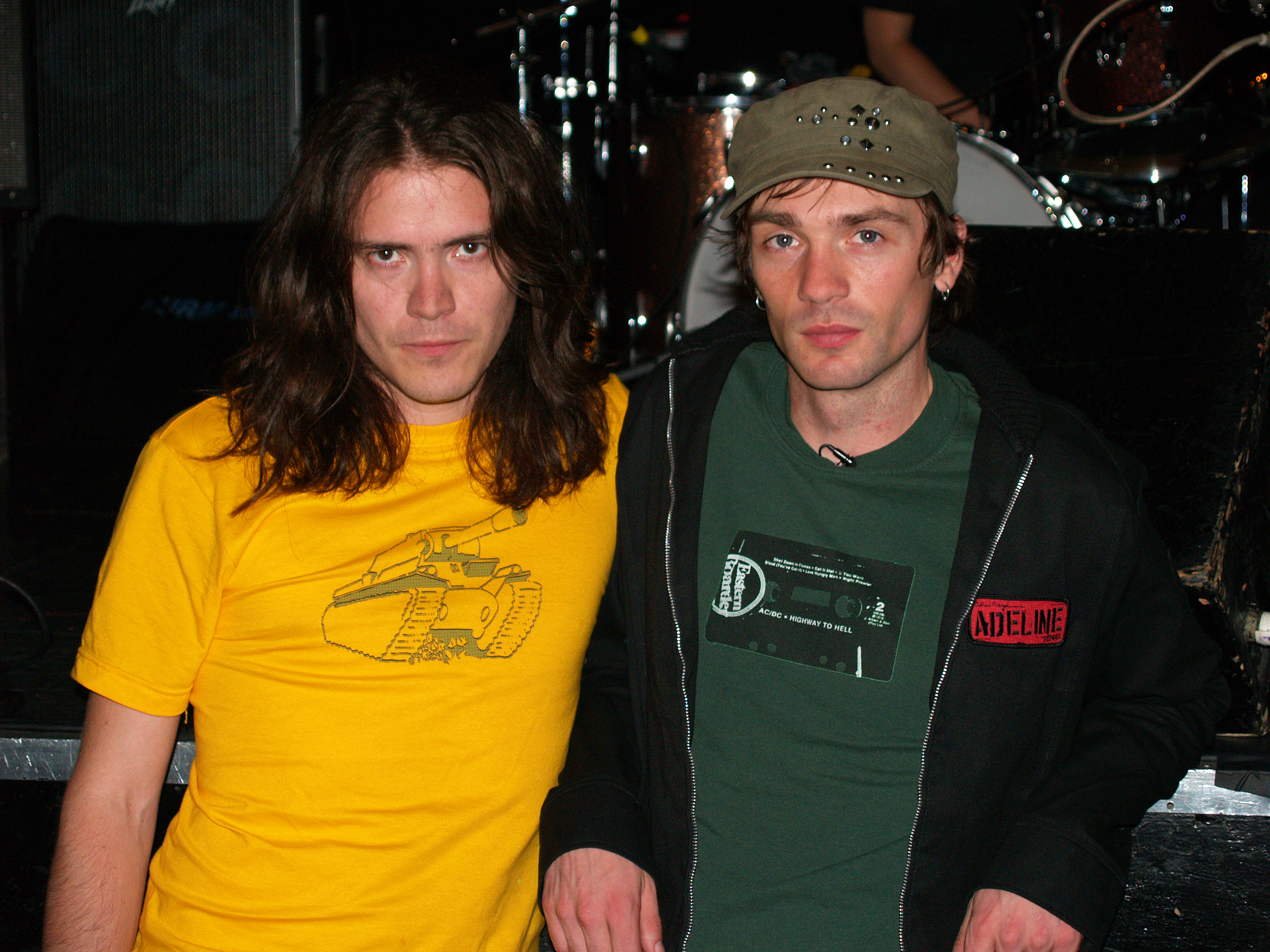
- Founders Alejandro Necochea and Bryn Bennett in 2007

Background information
- Origin: Boston, Massachusetts, U.S.
- Genres: Hard rock, arena rock
- Years active: 2005–2009, 2012, 2021–present
- Label: Black Sword Records

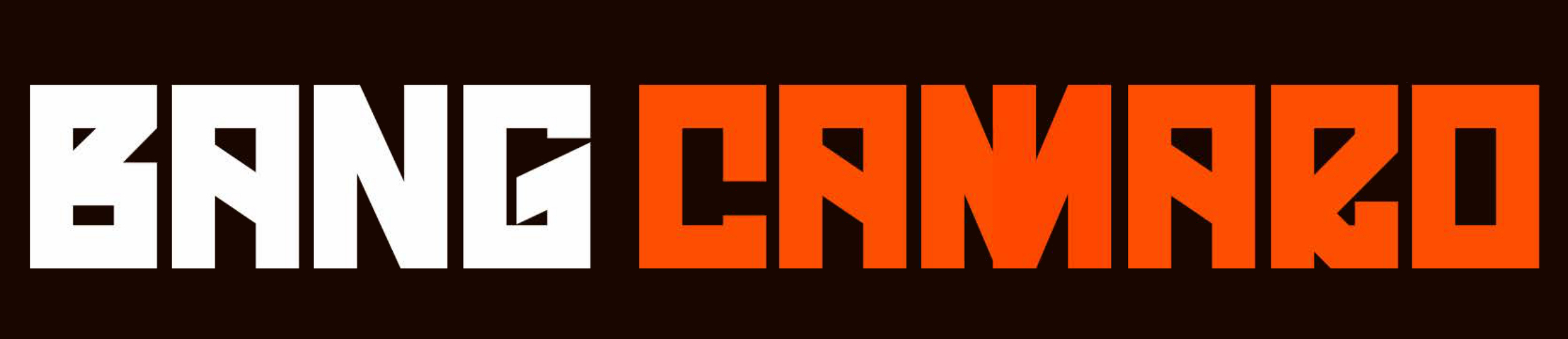
Official band logo as of 2022

Bang Camaro is an American hard rock band from Boston, Massachusetts. Founded by guitarists Bryn Bennett and Alejandro Necochea in 2005, it is composed of members of various indie rock bands from the area. In 2009, the group is signed with Black Sword Records, 8th Impression Music, and Fontana/Universal.

== Musical style and influences ==
The band is composed of a bassist, a drummer, two guitarists, and a lead singer complement drawing from a pool of eight to twelve vocalists. The basic song structure highlights catchy choruses and integrates frequent guitar solos.

The band cites as influences Elvis Presley and Buddy Holly, plus metal bands such as Iron Maiden, Skid Row, Def Leppard, and Dokken. Discussing their anthem rock style, band member Alejandro Necochea said, "We're really not heavy metal. I think our focus is more on writing great singles, as best as we can make them. That's just something Bryn and I grew up on. We're big fans of melody and big driving hooks."

== Band members ==
Current members

- Alejandro Necochea – rhythm guitar, lead guitar
- Bryn Bennett – lead guitar
- Dave "Doz" Riley – bass guitar, synthesizers
- Mike Piehl – drums
- John Brookhouse – vocals
- Morgan Brown – vocals
- Melissa Gibbs – vocals
- Nick Given – vocals
- Jared Marsh – vocals
- Tad McKitterick – vocals
- Kate Murdoch – vocals
- Mike Nastri – vocals
- Michelle Yvette Paulhus – vocals
- Marc Pinansky - vocals
- Mike Soltoff – vocals
- Steve Trombley – vocals
- Rodrigo Van Stoli – vocals
- Eric Waxwood - vocals
- Mike Quinn - engineer/mixer

Past members

- Maclaine Diemer – guitar, keyboards
- Mike Oor – guitar
- Seth Kasper – drums
- Peter McCarthy – drums
- Charlotte Anne Dole – drums
- Dylan Halacy – drums
- Richie Hoss – vocals
- Glen Fant – vocals
- Zach Given – vocals
- Jake Given – vocals
- Jay Clifford – vocals
- Andre Coles – vocals
- Graeme Hall – vocals
- Sean Barry – vocals
- Keith Wales – vocals
- James Fant – vocals
- Justin Buckley – vocals
- Max Heinegg – vocals
- Mike McKay – vocals
- Nate Wells – vocals
- Robb Waters – vocals

== Discography ==
Albums

- Bang Camaro (2007)
- Bang Camaro II (2008)
- Bang Camaro III (2023)

Singles

- "Too Fast to Fall in Love" (2022)
- "We Know You Know" (2023)

Compilations

- From Toronto with Love (Virgin Mobile Festival compilation) (2007) – features a live version of "Out on the Streets," which was recorded at the Bang Camaro album release show at Paradise Rock Club in Boston, MA in February 2007.
- Tankfarm Presents: Future Sounds 26 - Song unknown.

=== Television ===
In 2022, Bang Camaro's song "Push Push (Lady Lightning)" was featured in the promotional teaser for the HBO show Peacemaker, and also appeared in Episode 3: Better Goff Dead.
