= Rock Band =

Series of rhythm video games

- Genre: Rhythm
- Developers: Harmonix (2007–present); Pi Studios (2007–2009); TT Fusion (2009); Backbone Entertainment (2009–2010); EA Montreal (2009–2010)
- Publishers: MTV Games (2007–2010); Warner Bros. Interactive Entertainment (2009); EA Mobile (2009–2010); Harmonix (2010–present); Mad Catz (2011–2016); Performance Designed Products (2016–2024); Oculus Studios (2017)
- Platforms: PlayStation 2, PlayStation 3, PlayStation 4, PlayStation Portable, Xbox 360, Xbox One, Wii, Nintendo DS, mobile devices, iOS, Oculus Rift
- First release: Rock Band; November 20, 2007
- Latest release: Rock Band VR; March 23, 2017

Rock Band is a series of rhythm games first released in 2007 and developed by Harmonix. Based on their previous development work from the Guitar Hero series, the main Rock Band games have players use game controllers modeled after musical instruments and microphones to perform the lead guitar, bass guitar, keyboard, drums and vocal parts of numerous licensed songs across a wide range of genres though mostly focusing on rock music by matching scrolling musical notes patterns shown on screen. Certain games support the use of "Pro" instruments that require special controllers that more closely mimic the playing of real instruments, providing a higher challenge to players. Players score points for hitting notes successfully, but may fail a song if they miss too many notes. The series has featured numerous game modes, and supports both local and online multiplayer modes where up to four players in most modes can perform together.

Harmonix had worked with Red Octane for the Guitar Hero series first released in 2005; when Red Octane was acquired by Activision to continue Guitar Hero in 2007, MTV Games, a division of Viacom at the time, acquired Harmonix to expand the concept to Rock Band, and served as the game's publisher and manufacturer for the instrument controllers, with distribution handled by Electronic Arts. In 2009, due to saturation of the rhythm game market, sales of both Guitar Hero and Rock Band dropped; Harmonix's investors were able to buy the company from Viacom and making Harmonix an independent company, giving them more flexibility in options for the series. Harmonix transitioned to Mad Catz in 2011 for the publication and instrumentation controller manufacture. By 2013, Harmonix stopped producing downloadable content (DLC) for the current Rock Band 3, though stated that it would consider its options for the series upon the arrival of the next-generation of consoles. Following the release of the PlayStation 4 and Xbox One, Harmonix released Rock Band 4 in 2015 for the new consoles. While Mad Catz initially manufactured the new instrument controllers. the game was not as financially successful, a partial cause for Mad Catz to declare bankruptcy and requiring Harmonix to switch production to Performance Designed Products (PDP) for ongoing instrument controller manufacture.

There were four main games in the series, two band-specific spin-offs (The Beatles: Rock Band and Green Day: Rock Band), and several additional spin-off titles and Track Packs. Harmonix continued to support Rock Band through a persistent DLC model until January 2024, with routine releases of new songs on a weekly basis as well as the ability for players to import songs from previous games into newer ones. As of January 2024, Rock Band 4 supported over 3000 songs from this approach. Harmonix had also offered the Rock Band Network to allow bands and labels to publish their songs as Rock Band tracks that can be purchased by players, though the service has since been discontinued; at the height of this service, over 4,000 tracks from 1,200 artists were available for Rock Band players.

By 2009, over 13 million copies of Rock Band titles have been sold, netting more than $1 billion in total sales. Over 130 million downloadable song purchases have been made by 2009.

== History ==
Rock Band release timeline Main series in bold
2007	**Rock Band**
2008	**Rock Band 2**
2009	Rock Band Unplugged
2009	The Beatles: Rock Band
2009	Rock Band Mobile
2009	Rock Band (iOS)
2009	Lego Rock Band
2010	Green Day: Rock Band
2010	**Rock Band 3**
2010	Rock Band Reloaded
2011
2012	Rock Band Blitz
2013
2014
2015	**Rock Band 4**
2016
2017	Rock Band VR

=== Transition from Guitar Hero (2005–2008) ===
Prior to Guitar Hero and Rock Band, Harmonix had already established itself as a company that made game products that focused on music interactivity. Born out of Massachusetts Institute of Technology's Media Lab, the first product made by Harmonix was The Axe: Titans of Classic Rock for MS-DOS, challenging the player to use four keys on the keyboard to match notes in several songs. Looking to find a place for this type of game, Harmonix' founders Alex Rigopulos and Eran Egozy looked to Japan where music games like PaRappa the Rapper were becoming popular. This led to the creation of Frequency and its sequel Amplitude for the PlayStation 2; both games featured the concept of matching notes for specific instrument tracks along lanes. However, in retrospect, Harmonix found that players had difficulty initially understanding the game, as the presentation was an abstract concept that did not immediately connect the gameplay to the music. The idea of making an easy connection between the game and the music was used as a basis for their Karaoke Revolution games, which including using avatars singing and dancing in time to the music to strengthen the connection; this series was financially successful and helped grow the company.

Harmonix was approached by RedOctane to help develop the software for the first Guitar Hero game, itself based on Japanese games like Guitar Freaks. Harmonix used their previous experience in note-matching techniques from Frequency and Amplitude, as well as the lessons learned in developed Karaoke Revolution to create the Guitar Hero software. Harmonix was less concerned on developing gameplay, and instead more on connecting the player to the music, working to track the notes of the songs appropriately on the five-button controller as to make the player feel like they are playing the real instrument. Guitar Hero would go on to be a major success and found the basis of the Guitar Hero series.

As the success of the Guitar Hero series grew, Harmonix and RedOctane were purchased by MTV Games and Activision, respectively, in 2006; MTV paid $175 million to acquire Harmonix. RedOctane continued to publish the Guitar Hero series, bringing Neversoft on board for development duties. Harmonix was contractually committed to completing one final title, Guitar Hero Encore: Rocks the 80s, during and after the purchase negotiations.

With MTV Games, a subsidiary of Viacom, Harmonix took their experience from developing Guitar Hero and Karaoke Revolution to create the Rock Band series. According to Harmonix Vice President of Product Development, Greg LoPiccolo, the Harmonix team had already envisioned the possibility of different instruments before they were finished with the Guitar Hero series; Rigopulos noted that the Guitar Hero work was only a partial approach to this, limited to what they could do on a "shoe-string budget". Harmonix also embraced the idea of Rock Band as a platform rather than a software title, and took steps to incorporate downloadable content to extend players' music libraries without having them need to buy a new software disk. Rock Band was considered a success, leading to the development of sequels and spinoff titles. Viacom, under the terms of the acquisition, paid out $150 million in performance-based bonuses to Harmonix in early 2008 for their 2007 results, and were planning on a similar amount by the end of 2008. The Rock Band series scored what was considered a major coup by journalists when it successfully negotiated the rights to use the music of the Beatles in a video game, long considered a "holy grail" for music games.

=== Rhythm game saturation and decline (2009–2014) ===
By 2009, the market for rhythm games in general started to fall. The market had become saturated with titles, mostly from Activision's expansion of the Guitar Hero series, and consumers affected by the late-2000s recession were less likely to buy costly instrument controllers. Viacom had already reported significant losses on the Rock Band series, and sales of The Beatles: Rock Band did not meet their expectation. Viacom sought a refund on the $150 million already paid for the 2007 bonuses following its reassessment of the series' 2009 performance. Harmonix, anticipating the slowness of the market, developed Rock Band 3 with the introduction of several new features, most notably including the capability to connect real MIDI keyboards, MIDI guitars, and MIDI electronic drum kits, to create a "disruptive" game in the ailing rhythm game market by expanding to include real instruments.

Though Viacom continued to support the series throughout 2010, it announced that it was seeking a buyer for Harmonix, citing the series' continued profit losses and Viacom's inexperience at being a video game publisher. Harmonix was eventually sold at the end of 2010 to Harmonix-SBE Holdings LLC, an affiliate of investment firm Columbus Nova, LLC that included Harmonix shareholders. Though the net liability of the sale was valued at nearly $200 million, including existing unsold inventory and ongoing music license fees, analysts believe that Harmonix-SBE paid only $50 for the company, taking on the total financial liability that Viacom was able to write off in their books. The MTV Games division at Viacom was later closed.

As a shareholder-held company, Harmonix retained the rights to the Rock Band and Dance Central franchises, and continued to support and develop the games. The company still faced some fallout from the sale, laying off about 15% of its staff in February 2011. In the same month, Activision announced that it abandoned ongoing development of planned Guitar Hero titles, which many journalists considered to signal the end of peripheral-based rhythm games. Though Harmonix considered the closure of Guitar Hero as "discouraging", they affirmed that they would continue to develop Rock Band and Dance Central and support their downloadable content for the immediate future. Other journalists believed that without competition, Harmonix no longer needed to develop under the same pressure, allowing them to polish and innovate for future titles in the series, bringing a likely future resurgence of the market.

In March 2012, Harmonix affirmed that it had no plans for a fourth major release title within the year, but was still strongly supporting the game through downloadable content through the year. By early 2013, the company stated that while they may come back to Rock Band at a future time, they were shifting resources to develop new titles, and later announced that it would discontinue its regular downloadable content for the series after providing over 275 continuous weeks of such content.

=== Reintroduction for eighth-generation consoles (2015–current) ===
Rigopulos stated at his keynote at the 2014 Penny Arcade Expo East that the studio had plans to bring Rock Band to eighth-generation consoles "at some point" and with "guns blazing". Rigopulos states that the studio was "waiting for just the right moment in the new generation of consoles to bring it back". Following two sets of unexpected DLC releases in early 2015 as a survey sent to Rock Band fans, the industry started to speculate that Harmonix was looking to revive the series. Bloomberg reported that Harmonix was working on a new version of Rock Band for the next-generation of consoles in late February.

Rock Band 4 was officially announced in March 2015, for release later in October 2015 on the PlayStation 4 and Xbox One. Rock Band 4 supported nearly all previous content released for the series, including imports from the Rock Band 3 and all prior official DLC. Initially Rock Band 4 was released in partnership with Mad Catz for production of the instrument peripherals and co-publishing, but the game did not sell as well as expected leading to a US$11 million loss for Mad Katz, who subsequently terminated the agreement by June 2016 and temporarily had entered a period of bankruptcy. Harmonix switched to Performance Designed Products (PDP) to continue hardware manufacturing and co-publishing with the release of the "Rivals" expansion for Rock Band 4. Harmonix attempted to crowdfund the development of Rock Band 4 for personal computers through Fig (which Harmonix's Rigopulos had become a board member of), but this failed to meet the target goal, though Harmonix had not ruled out other means to bring the series to personal computers through other means. Harmonix continued to support Rock Band 4 with weekly DLC through January 2024 and with the introduction of its "Rivals" gameplay mode, eight-week seasonal challenges for players to earn new cosmetics.

A separate Rock Band VR title was developed for the Oculus Rift virtual reality headset and released in March 2017.

Harmonix was acquired by Epic Games in 2021. As part of Epic, Harmonix developed a new mode for Fortnite, Fortnite Festival, which was released in December 2023. This mode mimicked much of the Rock Band aspects within the Fortnite game. With this new game, Harmonix ended its weekly DLC for Rock Band in January 2024, though all online service would remain active for the foreseeable future. On October 5, 2025, Harmonix announced that Rock Band 4 would be delisted from online storefronts due to many of the music licenses expiring after ten years, though those that had already purchased the game would still be able to download and play. Similarly, downloadable content would be removed as their ten-year licenses expire, though remain available for those that already owned it. Harmonix also clarified that DLC songs released before Rock Band 4 were not being delisted yet, but their team "will be figuring those out over the coming months."

== Games ==
=== Main games ===
Harmonix has released four mainline titles in the Rock Band series: Rock Band (2007), Rock Band 2 (2008), Rock Band 3 (2010), and Rock Band 4 (2015). Each game provides from 57 to 84 songs on-disc with support for additional songs to be purchased as downloadable content. The games feature a variety of modes, including single player career modes, offline and online cooperative modes as part of a band, and competitive modes. Most songs from earlier iterations can be exported for play in future versions for a small licensing fee. However, premium or upgraded DLC content cannot be transferred to Rock Band 4.

=== Band-specific games ===
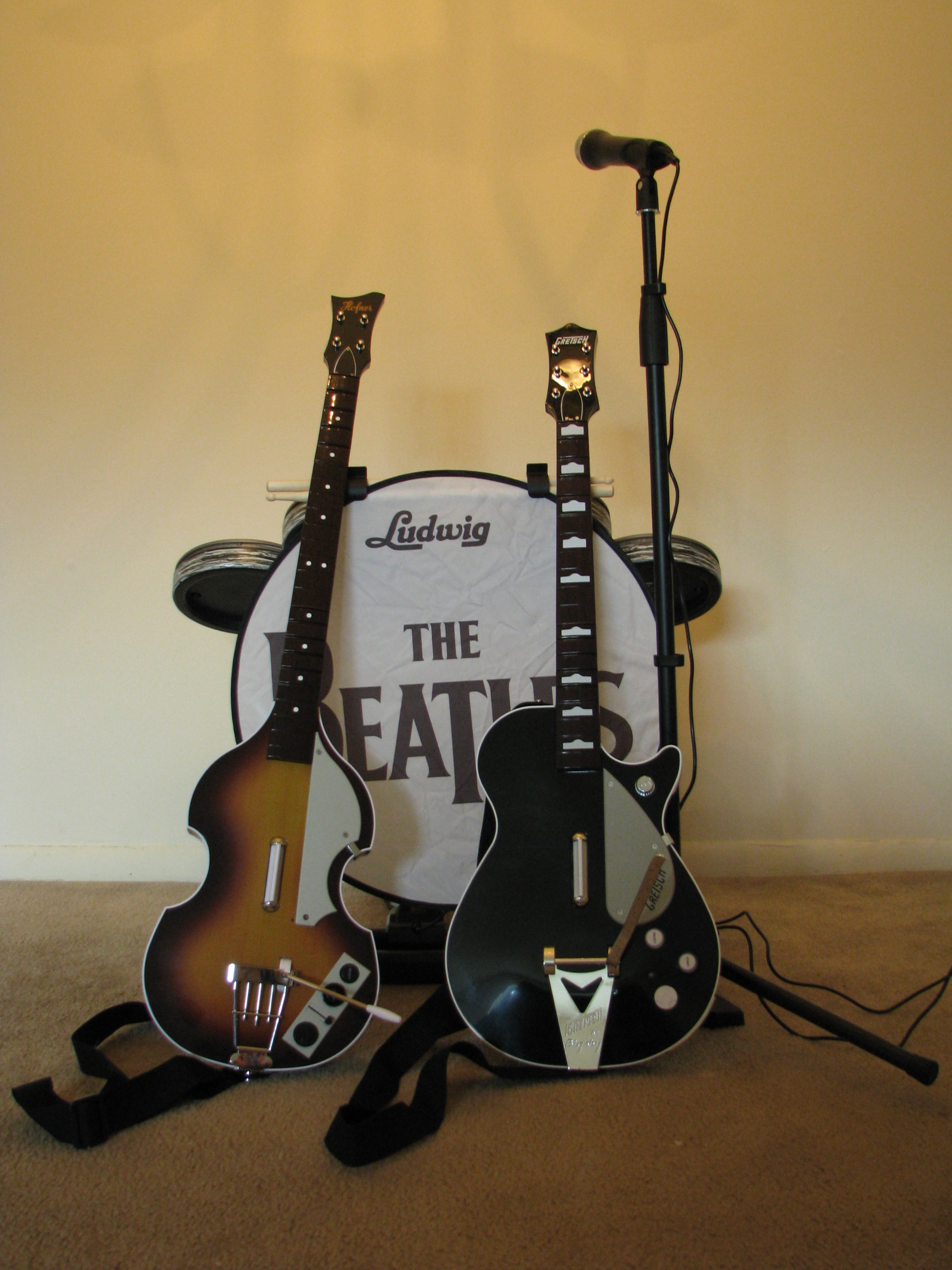
The Beatles Rock Band complete set of controllers, Missing the Rickenbacker 325

In October 2008, Harmonix, along with MTV Games, announced an exclusive agreement with Apple Corps, Ltd. to produce a standalone title, titled The Beatles: Rock Band, based on the Rock Band premise and featuring the music of the Beatles. The game was released on September 9, 2009, coinciding with the release of remastered collections of the Beatles' albums, and features a visual and musical history of the Beatles with United Kingdom-released versions of songs from their albums Please Please Me through Let It Be. The game also has been supported by downloadable content, with three full albums, Abbey Road, Sgt. Pepper's Lonely Hearts Club Band, and Rubber Soul, available to purchase. Though branded as a Rock Band game, the title remains as a standalone game in the series. It includes a function to add new songs to the game disc.

Following on the success of The Beatles: Rock Band, Green Day: Rock Band was released in June 2010. It includes the band's songs, including full albums for Dookie, American Idiot, and 21st Century Breakdown, avatars of the band's members and venues after real-life performances of the group. The track list is fully exportable to other Rock Band games.

Several bands stated they were seeking to or working with Harmonix to develop band-specific content for the series. The band Pearl Jam worked with Harmonix and MTV Games along with Rhapsody on a Rock Band-related project that was to be released in 2010, allowing for users to vote for their favorite live versions of the band's music. In August 2011 it was rumoured that the Pearl Jam related project would be released as downloadable content, but Harmonix spokesman John Drake later clarified that while a Pearl Jam-based game was deep in development, it was ultimately cancelled.

The band U2, after declining an option to place themselves in a Rock Band game in 2008, were reconsidering their stance after seeing the success of The Beatles: Rock Band, according to bassist Adam Clayton. Similarly, Queen were in behind-the-scenes talks about a possible title for their group within Rock Band, according to Brian May. Even though no game based on the band was released, Lego avatars of the band members appeared in Lego Rock Band. Roger Daltrey of The Who had stated that a Rock Band-title based on his group's music would be available in 2010; however, no such title was released in 2010, or after that year for that matter. Though Janie Hendrix had stated she allowed for Jimi Hendrix's works to be used for a Rock Band game to be released in 2010, this was later clarified as licensing several full albums from Hendrix to be made as downloadable content. Harmonix had also considered standalone band games for Pink Floyd and Led Zeppelin, but neither project proceeded past developing concept art and cinematics.

=== Spin-offs ===
Lego Rock Band features Lego-style avatars with full customization along with a family-friendly soundtrack.

Harmonix and MTV Games have worked with TT Fusion and Warner Bros. Interactive Entertainment to create Lego Rock Band. The game includes songs that are "suitable for younger audiences." The game also includes the "fun, customization and humor of the Lego videogame franchise" by allowing players to create their own Lego-style avatars. The game added a new "super easy" gameplay mode in order to accommodate younger players. The game, which was released on November 3, 2009, on the Xbox 360, PlayStation 3, and Wii consoles, supports all existing Rock Band instruments. The game is able to utilize selected existing downloadable content for the other Rock Band games that have been deemed acceptable for the game's audience, except on the Nintendo Wii, and all songs on the game's main setlist can be exported for use in other Rock Band games.

Harmonix had planned to release a spin-off of Rock Band for Japanese audiences in co-development with Q Entertainment. The title, initially announced in 2008, would have featured J-pop music, and would have been "the first US-originated rock music game to be heavily localized for the Japanese market". Japanese artists had expressed interest in the venture, such as X Japan. Harmonix has since stated that this project has been discontinued, but have considered the inclusion of popular Japanese music within Rock Band's regular downloadable content. Alex Rigopulos later clarified that they found it difficult to license Japanese music for such a release, and had considered both the cost of manufacturing and shipping instrument controllers to Japan, and the limited space that many Japanese players would have in their homes.

Rock Band Blitz is a downloadable title in the series released for the Xbox 360 and PlayStation 3 in October 2012. It is similar to Rock Band Unplugged, using gameplay similar to Frequency and Amplitude. The game included 25 songs (23 new to the series, and two that were previously unavailable to export due to licensing issues), but can use any previously downloaded song in the player's library; the 25 songs were also available to be played within Rock Band 3. Unlike the previous games in the series, Blitz is designed for use with a standard console controller, using buttons on the controller to switch tracks and match notes. The single-player game is designed with numerous "arcade" elements including a number of power-ups that make it more a score attack game than previous titles. Released alongside the game was a Facebook application, Rock Band World, that connected to players' games, offering challenges and tracking players scores in both Blitz and Rock Band 3.

Shortly after release of Rock Band 3, Harmonix began work on Rock Band Sessions. Instead of matching notes as in the main games, Sessions would have players making their own music in songs where several of the other instrument tracks were already completed; one example given by Daniel Sussman was to complete a bass line atop existing guitar, drums, and vocal tracks. If the player opted, they would have been able to allow the pre-existing track to be played instead and only provide their own music in certain sections of the song. Sessions was originally conceived as a multiplayer title but Harmonix found that having multiple players attempt to make their own music at the same time was too chaotic, and instead reworked it as a single-player game, with the player able to work each track separately and eventually bring them together in a final song. Though Harmonix had developed a working prototype for the game, they found that it would not adapt well to their existing licensed song library and would be difficult to use in future Rock Band games, and that they did not feel this was a type of game they could sell to their player base at full price. Sessions has been shelved, though some of the lessons they learned were used to help develop Rock Band 4, and may come back to the title at a later date.

Harmonix also was involved with BandFuse: Rock Legends, released in November 2013, which for a time was referred to as "Rock Band 3.1".

In 2015, Oculus VR announced at The Game Awards that they would be partnering with Harmonix to make a virtual reality Rock Band game for the Rift titled Rock Band VR, to be released in 2016. Harmonix began work on the title in October 2015. The game, focused solely on guitar players, uses the Oculus Rift Touch controllers in addition to the headset, one which is attached to the guitar controller. These provide the player with a first-person view of their guitarist on stage which reacts to the player's movements. In a demonstration at the 2016 Game Developers Conference, the game was set up so that the player could see the note tracks located on the floor monitors on the virtual stage, requiring the player to look down to track them, but Harmonix stated they were exploring other means to provide this input. The player can engage other actions in the VR world by looking at certain stage elements, such as by keeping their focus on a foot pedal, they can activate pyrotechnics on the virtual stage. The game was released on March 23, 2017, and shipped with 60 songs on release and has 21 DLC songs. It was nominated for "Best Game Audio Article, Publication or Broadcast" ("Steve Pardo: Creating Rock Band VR") and "Best VR Audio" at the 16th Annual Game Audio Network Guild Awards.

In November 2021, Harmonix was acquired by Epic Games. They developed Fortnite's music game Fortnite Festival, which released on December 9, 2023.

=== Portable games ===
Rock Band Unplugged was developed by Backbone Entertainment and was released for the PlayStation Portable in North America on June 9, 2009 and later that year in Europe. The game uses the PSP's Wi-Fi capabilities to provide an online store for additional downloadable content from music providers. The gameplay is similar to the previous Harmonix games Frequency and Amplitude, with the player using the face buttons on the PSP to match notes; after completing a length of a phrase on a given instrument, that instrument will then play by itself for a while, allowing the player to switch to another instrument. The DS versions of Lego Rock Band and Rock Band 3 use a similar gameplay system to Rock Band Unplugged.

A mobile phone version of Rock Band was developed by EA Mobile to work with various phones; the game was released to Verizon users on September 16, 2009. The game features many of the same modes as the main Rock Band series, including the ability to play with other users through the software. The game offers the ability to play any of the four instruments on 25 songs selected from the existing Rock Band library. A version simply titled Rock Band for iOS was also released in October 2009, with gameplay described as similar to Tap Tap Revenge and allowing up to four people to play together with Bluetooth connections. Rock Band Reloaded was released on December 2, 2010.

== Gameplay ==
The Rock Band games are score-based music video games that combine elements of two of Harmonix' previous efforts: Guitar Hero and Karaoke Revolution, allowing up to four players to play on lead and bass guitar, drums, and vocals. Rock Band 3 expands this number to seven, including a keyboardist and two harmony vocalists. Players use these instruments to play scrolling musical "notes" on-screen in time with music.

Rock Band titles' gameplay and on-screen interface use a combination of elements from Guitar Hero and Karaoke Revolution. Rock Band has up to three tracks of vertically scrolling colored music notes, one section each for lead guitar, drums, and bass. The colored notes on-screen correspond to buttons on the guitar and drum peripherals. For lead and bass guitar, players play their notes by holding down colored fret buttons on the guitar peripheral and pushing the controller's strum bar; for drums, players must strike the matching colored drumhead, or step on the pedal to simulate playing bass drum notes. Along the top of the screen is the vocals display, which scrolls horizontally, similar to Karaoke Revolution. The lyrics display beneath green bars, which represent the pitch of the individual vocal elements. When singing vocals, the player must sing in relative pitch to the original vocals. A pitch indicator displays the singer's accuracy relative to the original pitch by moving up or down to indicate high or low pitches, respectively. The Beatles: Rock Band introduces three-part harmonies using three separate microphones, a feature later carried over into Green Day: Rock Band and Rock Band 3. If any part is not being played, its interface does not appear on-screen. The remainder of the screen is used to display the band's virtual characters as they perform in concert.

During cooperative play as a band, all players earn points towards a common score, though score multipliers and "Overdrive" (an accumulated bonus that is the equivalent of Guitar Hero's "Star Power") are tracked separately for each player. The bass guitar player's multiplier can reach as high as 6x (compared to a 4x multiplier for the other players) and achieve "Bass Groove". Overdrive is collected during select portions of a song by successfully playing all white notes within that section (guitar and bass players can also use the guitar controller's whammy bar to extract Overdrive from white sustained notes). Once the Energy Meter is filled halfway, players can deploy their Overdrive, resulting in the "Band Meter" (which tracks how well each player is doing) changing more dramatically. This allows players to strategically use Overdrive to raise the Band Meter and pass portions of a song they otherwise might have failed. Overdrive can be used to activate score multipliers, which vary based on a player's note streak. In solo play, deploying Overdrive doubles the player's score multiplier. However, in band play, activating Overdrive instead increases the score multiplier of the entire band by two. Additionally, players can deploy Overdrive independently of each other (Guitar Hero games prior to World Tour require players in Co-Operative mode to deploy Star Power simultaneously), as well as collect additional Overdrive while it is deployed and draining.

Each band member can choose the difficulty at which they play (spanning Easy, Medium, Hard, and Expert; a "Super Easy" difficulty is also present in Lego Rock Band for younger players). Furthermore, with Rock Band 3, players can select the Pro mode of their instrument if they have the appropriate controller for it; Pro mode challenges guitar, bass, drums, and keyboards to play their controllers closer to the real-life instrument, note-for-note. If a player does not play well enough and falls to the bottom of the Band Meter, they will fail out of the song and their instrument will be muted from the audio mix. However, any active player can activate their Overdrive to bring failed players back into the song, "saving" the band member. However, a band member can only be saved twice; after the third failure, they cannot be brought back for that song. Failed players continuously drag the band's Band Meter down until they are saved. If the player is not saved before the Band Meter reaches the bottom, the band fails the song. Special portions of songs are labeled as "Unison Phrases," which reward the band with a score and Overdrive bonus if each player can play their parts perfectly during the phrase. Select songs end with a special "Big Rock Ending," which gives the players a chance to improvise and earn extra points. If each player successfully plays the final notes of the song following the freestyle portion of the "Big Rock Ending," the band earns all of the "Big Rock Ending" points. Otherwise, the bonus is lost.

As the song progresses, the screen shows a meter with the current accumulated score for the game, as well as the number of "stars" earned so far based on their score and the progress towards the next star indicated by a partially filled ring. Players can earn up to five stars, with the chance of getting 5 "gold stars" by getting a very high score with all players on the Expert difficulty. The performance's star rating will influence the monetary reward and number of fans for the song within the various game modes, or in the case of Rock Band 3, the number of fans earned and speed progress towards the virtual band's Career Mode goals.

=== Instrument peripherals ===
Rock Band features instrument controllers designed for the game. However, Harmonix and other companies have attempted to provide compatibility between competing instrument controllers and music games, allowing Rock Band to be playable without use of specific controllers, and to reuse Rock Band controllers in other music games. Prior to Rock Band 3, most instrument controllers were made by MTV Games and Harmonix, with several third-party vendors supply alternate versions. On January 4, 2008, video game peripherals manufacturer Mad Catz announced it had reached an agreement with MTV and Harmonix to produce peripherals for Rock Band. This agreement also gave MadCatz the ability to bundle and sell their products with Rock Band game titles. Mad Catz continued to support the series for the release of Rock Band 4 in 2015, but in early 2016 announced financial difficulties due to weak sales of Rock Band 4. Harmonix subsequently announced that, starting in 2016, PDP would be producing and supporting instrument hardware for Rock Band 4.

==== Guitar ====
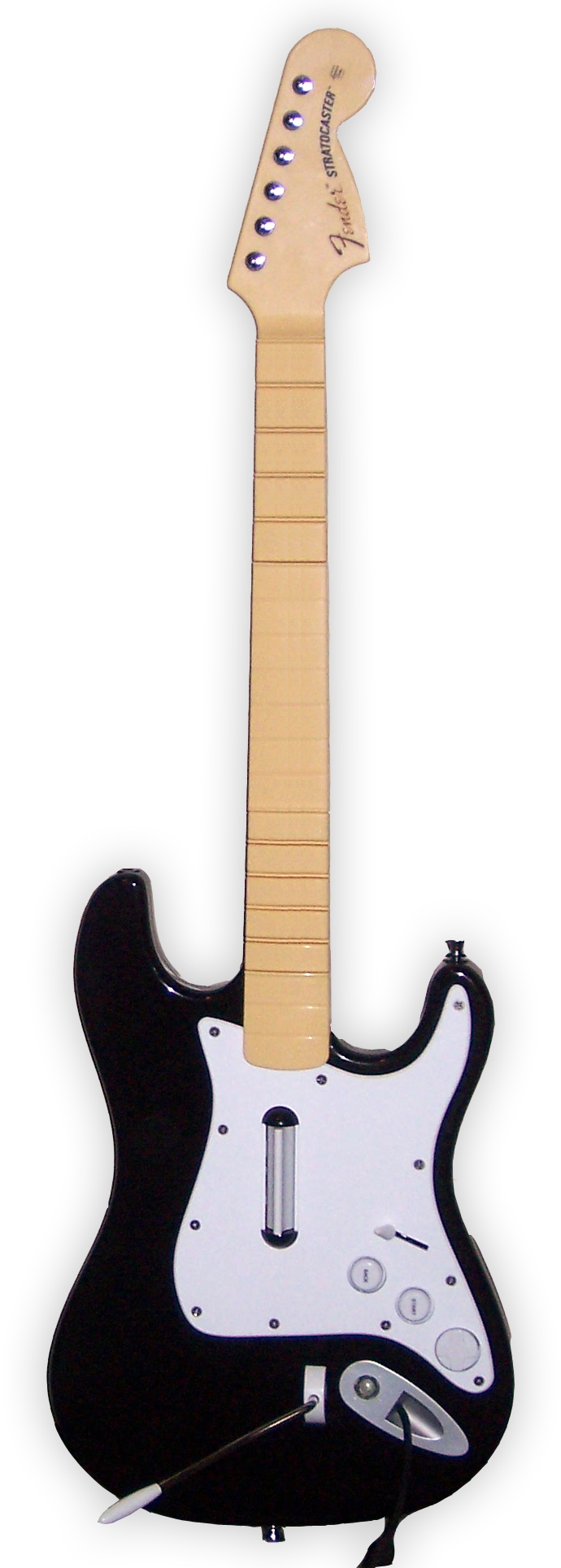
A first generation Fender Stratocaster Controller for Xbox 360, which features 10 frets, a whammy bar, and an effects switch

The guitar controller for Rock Band, modeled after a Fender Stratocaster, is used for lead guitar and bass guitar gameplay. It has several features akin to Guitar Hero's controller, as it features five colored fret buttons on the neck of the guitar (which correspond to on-screen notes), a strum bar, and a whammy bar. To use the guitar controller, players must hold the fret button that corresponds to the scrolling colored note on-screen while simultaneously pushing the strum bar. In addition, five smaller fret buttons are located further down on the neck. These buttons can be used to play all notes in guitar solos (denoted by the note track turning blue) as hammer-ons and pull-offs, without the need to strum. With the addition of Freestyle Solos introduced in Rock Band 4, these frets can also manipulate the sound of the notes you play. The whammy bar can be used to distort the sound of held notes. A 5-way special effects switch can be used to toggle between five different guitar effects during solos and Overdrive periods (ranging from wah-wah, flange, chorus, echo, distortion, doubler, slap back echo, medium echo, and long echo), however, this switch was removed from the Rock Band 3 edition of the guitar. Overdrive for guitarists can be deployed by holding the controller in a vertical position or pressing the "Select/Back/-" button. The controller is offered in both wired and wireless versions. Rock Band games allow players to apply a "Lefty Flip" setting, supporting left-handed guitar players. The second version of the controller, distributed with Rock Band 2, introduced quieter fret buttons, a more reliable strum bar, and optical sensor and microphone to help the player calibrate the video and audio output from their television/stereo system's setup.

Rock Band 3 introduces "Pro Mode" to the Rock Band franchise for both guitar and bass players, where players finger specific strings and frets instead of colored buttons in Easy to Medium mode, while on Expert mode players are required to play the actual guitar chords and solos, note for note. Two completely new guitar controllers were developed for use in this mode - both of them legitimate MIDI guitars. The first one MadCatz created was based on the bass version of the Fender Mustang, featuring 105 buttons each representing every spot possible on the neck up to 17 frets, and a "string box" where the player strums strings, it was made of plastic and can be a step up from the legacy five lane controllers. The second takes an authentic, actual Squier Stratocaster guitar by Fender, the complete guitar with strings and up to the standard 22 frets, added a "string box" near the strumming area for hit detection, and rebuilt the neck to have a fret-sensing feature in order to tell the game where the player's fingers are on the fret board. There is also a "mute bar" built into the guitar which can be raised or lowered; in the raised position the strings of the guitar are softly muted so as to not ring out. This mute bar is what allows the string box to detect and translate individual string hits for the game. In the lowered position, the guitar strings won't be muted and therefore lets the strings ring out for normal guitar playing outside of the Rock Band game. Tuning this specialized guitar is not necessary for playing Rock Band, as for the game the guitar functions in MIDI mode and the guitar's sound comes from sound files of the actual guitar playing in the songs painstakingly designed from audio master stems of each song for the game. Both of these officially made MIDI guitars utilize Pro Mode, allowing for accurate fingering while playing with the added effect of learning how to play the song for real on guitar, either alone or with friends playing the song with you on any other instrument or controller, even online. Of the two Pro guitars, only the MadCatz Mustang model - with 105 buttons - was capable of playing "legacy" (5-lane) guitar or bass charts. The Mustang was the first available unit, with the Squier becoming available in March 2011.

==== Drum kit ====
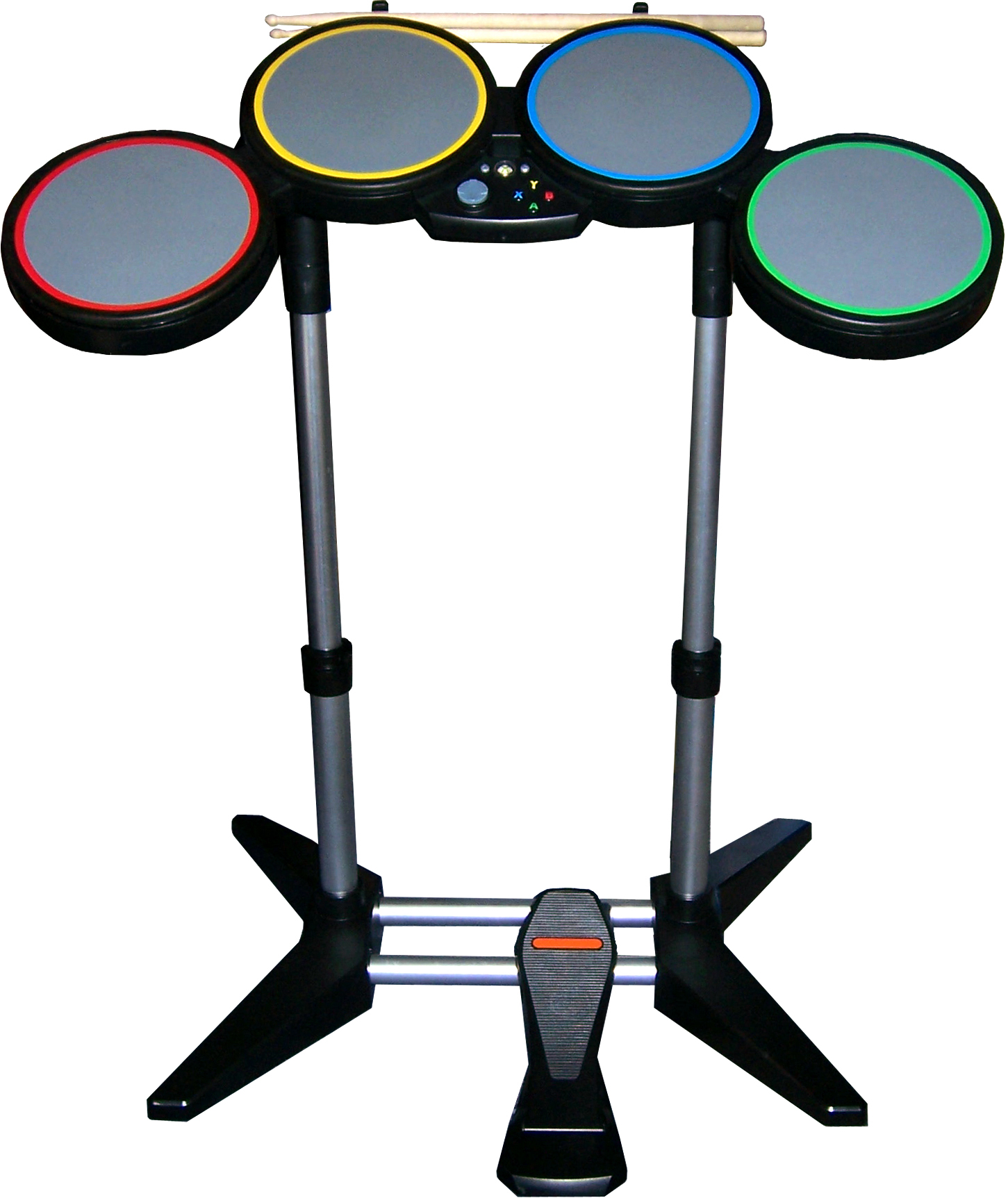
A first generation Rock Band drum controller for Xbox 360, featuring four pads and a bass pedal

The drum set for Rock Band features four rubber drum pads and a bass pedal. The pads have colored rings around the edges that correspond to the colored notes on-screen. These pads generally represent a snare drum (red), hi-hat/tom tom (yellow), ride cymbal/tom (blue), and crash cymbals/floor tom (green), though some songs may use the pads for other percussion instruments. The pedal represents the bass drum (orange), with on-screen notes represented as orange horizontal lines across the on-screen drum track. To use the drum controller, players must strike the pads with drum sticks and press the bass pedal to match the scrolling notes on-screen. Drummers can improvise in special "freestyle drum fill" sections of songs, indicated by the on-screen columns for each note turning a solid color. The four pads will commonly change functionality to represent other drums, depending on the requirements of a song. The default pad order can be reversed using the "Lefty Mode" option in the game. The legs of the drum peripheral can adjust in height or be detached if the player wishes to place it on a table-top. The drum controller also features standard controller buttons in the middle of the peripheral for navigating in-game menus. Overdrive for drummers can be deployed by hitting the crash cymbal (green note for right-handed configuration) that appears directly after a freestyle drum fill. The second version of the controller, distributed with Rock Band 2, introduced quieter, "velocity sensitive" drum pads, a reinforced bass pedal, wireless capabilities, and compatibility with separately sold cymbals. ION Audio has also produced a premium drum kit that includes cymbals and can be upgraded with a drum brain to be used as an electronic drum kit.

Pro mode for drums was introduced in Rock Band 3, requiring players to equip the existing drum set with up to three cymbal units. The game marks cymbal notes as circles in contrast to the regular rectangular pad notes, and the drum player is required to hit the cymbals instead of the pads for these notes when they occur. The general function for these colors still apply however the hi-hat, ride, and crash are now separate from the pads. Electronic drum kits were also supported through MIDI connection via the Rock Band 3 MIDI PRO-Adapter.

==== Microphone ====
The microphone is a standard USB microphone. Players can use most other USB microphones, while Xbox 360 users can substitute their console's headset if they wish, though the option to use a headset over a microphone is absent in Rock Band 3, The Beatles: Rock Band and Green Day: Rock Band. For the most part, singers are judged on how closely they match the relative pitch of the song's vocalist. During "talking parts" that do not judge pitch, a phoneme detector picks up individual vowels and consonants of the spoken lyrics, songs that contain unclean vocals (growled or screamed vocals) are also judged in this way. Some sections without vocals will display circle notes, allowing for the microphone to be used as a tambourine and cowbell by hitting it with your palm or making vocal cues. Overdrive for singers can be deployed by making a brief sound through the microphone during sections of songs, denoted by yellow artwork in the background of the vocals interface. While the "Big Rock Ending" section is unavailable to that instrument, "Overdrive" can mandatory be activated during that section while playing as a band member.

==== Keyboard ====
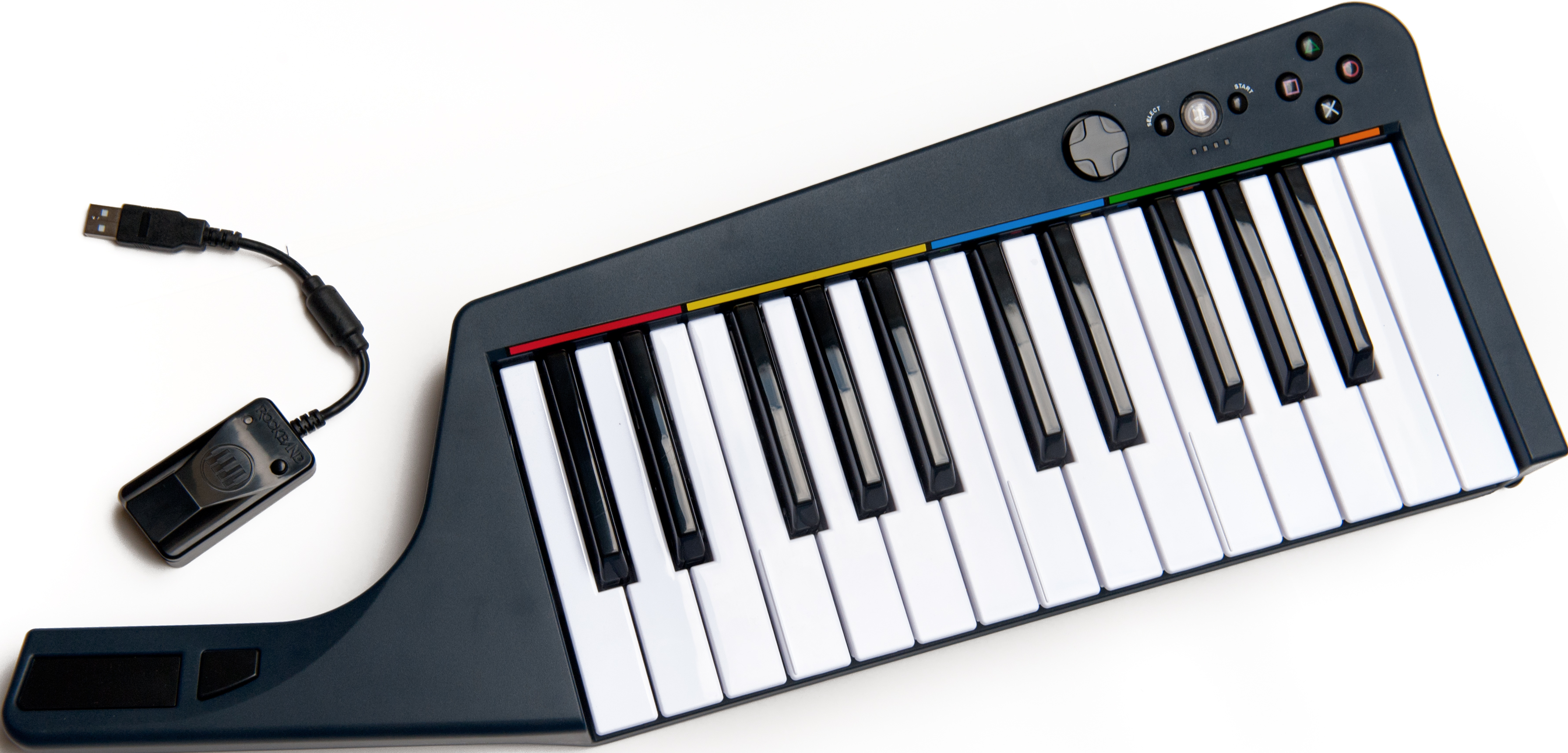
Rock Band 3 wireless keyboard for PlayStation 3

A keyboard instrument was introduced with Rock Band 3. Using a special adapter, players can use any MIDI-compatible electronic keyboard to play such parts with the game. A special MIDI-compatible 25-key keyboard was manufactured by Mad Catz and was bundled with sales of the new game. This unit is shaped like a keytar and is possible to play both sitting down or standing up. The unit's neck contains the Overdrive activation button, and a touchstrip that acts as an effects bar to alter the tone of the instrument. The keyboard unit is not necessary to play non-Pro keyboard parts in Rock Band 3 as any compatible guitar controller can also be used; similarly, the keyboard can be used to play any non-Pro guitar or bass parts. However, a keyboard unit is required for the Pro versions of keyboard parts, and can only be played by a keyboard.

=== Game modes ===
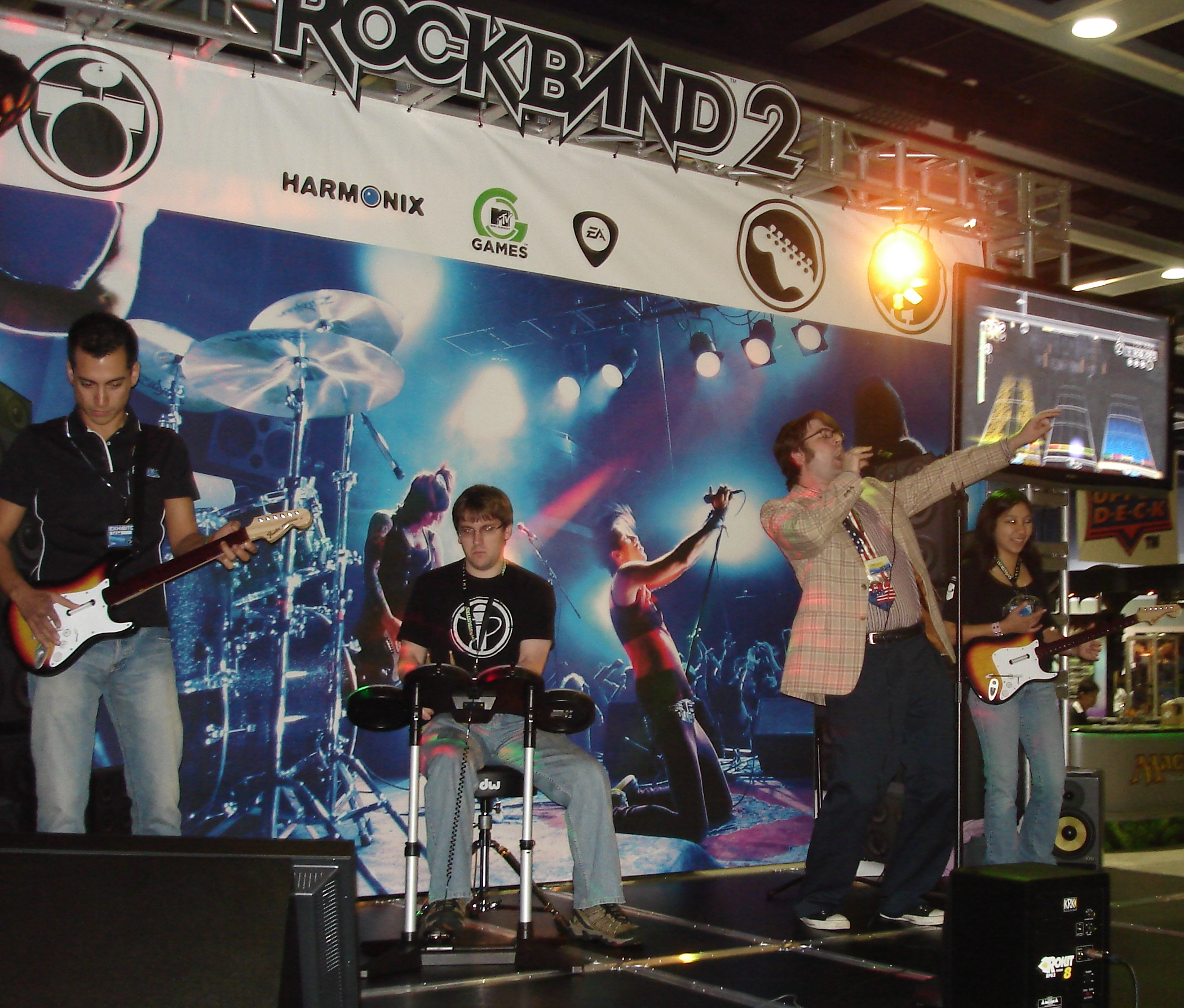
An on-the-spot group plays Rock Band 2 during the 2008 Penny Arcade Expo.

The primary mode of play in both games is a "Band World Tour" mode (renamed "Tour" for Rock Band 2); in the first Rock Band, this was limited to a band of two or more players playing locally, but Rock Band 2 expanded this to any number of players, locally or online. After choosing a band name and hometown city, the band members can create their own rock characters, as well as a band logo. Once setup is complete, the band can begin playing concerts in small venues in their hometown until they unlock vans, tour buses and private jets, which unlock more cities and different continents. Unlocking and completing new gigs unlocks additional songs for play across all game modes. Successful performances also earn the band fans (used as a metric of measuring the band's popularity), stars (which accumulate based on the success of each individual song performed), and in-game cash (which each player can spend at the "Rock Shop"). Most cities and larger venues require the band to achieve a certain number of fans and stars before they are unlocked. In the process, bands can loop through cities multiple times, eventually playing larger venues in cities they have already visited. In-game venues are inspired by real-life venues and often display local art styles from each of the represented cities.

Players complete unique sets of activities at each venue. Performances consist of single songs, multiple song sets, "make your own" setlists, and mystery setlists. Players are also faced with decisions that Harmonix refers to as "risk-versus-reward." Bands need to choose which sized venue they perform at carefully, as a poor performance at a larger venue poses a greater threat of the band losing fans. For certain performances, bands are faced with an optional challenge that requires the band to average a certain number of stars for their gig in order to reap the rewards. Bands can also choose to perform a benefit concert (earning no in-game money but gaining more fans) or "sell-out" (earning more in-game money but losing fans). Additionally, for certain gigs, bands can compete for band managers, roadies, security personnel, and sound guys, as well as a recording deal with a record label. The "Endless Setlist" allows players to experience an all-day concert atmosphere, as the setlist requires playing the entire game disc's setlist from beginning to end.

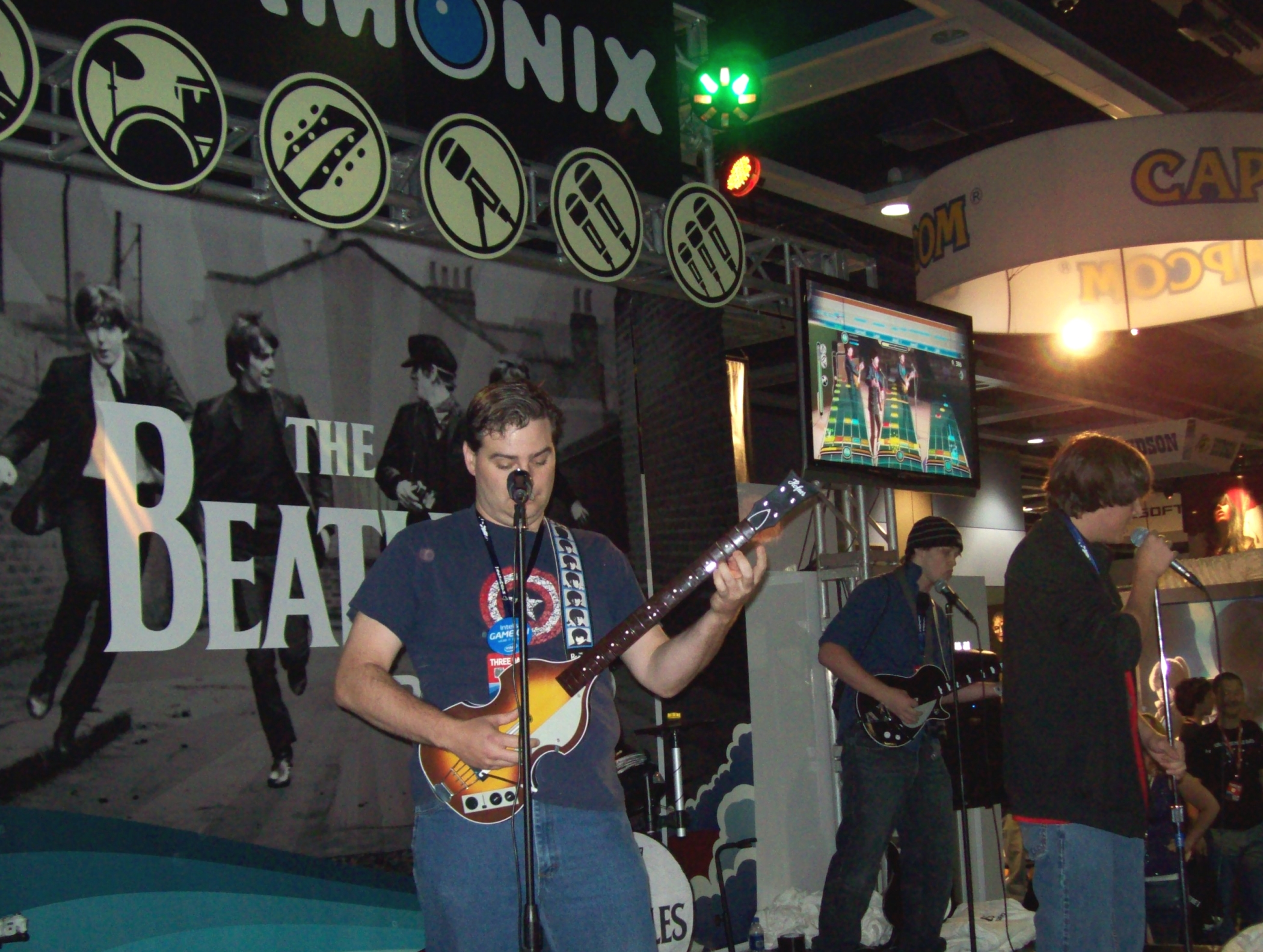
A group plays The Beatles: Rock Band at PAX 2009.

Rock Band 2 introduced two new modes. "Challenges" allow a band to play through pre-determined setlists, arranged via difficulty, to earn in-game money. These "Challenges" include those based on songs on-disc, as well as through additional songs from the first Rock Band or from downloadable content. A "Battle of the Bands" mode consists of limited-time online tournaments updated on a daily basis. Each specific "Battle of the Band" challenge will have a number of songs and may have specific requirements or limitations; for example, a challenge may require a vocalist, or that the band cannot use Overdrive for the challenge. The goal in these challenges is to achieve the best "score", which may be the numerical score, the number of stars earned, or the longest streak of consecutive notes played correctly. This score is tracked on global leaderboards, and allow the players to compare their performance to their friends and others. "Battle of the Bands" challenges utilize both on-disc content and other songs the players may have available.

The first Rock Band features a more traditional "Career" mode for a single player on either lead guitar, drums, or vocals, dividing the on-disk songs into nine tiers arranged by difficulty of the song for that instrument. Each subsequent tier would only be unlocked after completing the songs in the previous tier. The player would earn in-game money based on their performance. This was removed in Rock Band 2 for the improved "Tour" mode.

"Quickplay" mode allows up to four players to play any song that has been unlocked. Single players may play head-to-head with another player on the same instrument either through "Score Battles" (both playing at the same time to earn the highest score) or "Tug of War" (each trading off sections of a song, trying to outplay the other). Also included are "Tutorial Mode", which allows players to learn how to play each instrument, and "Practice Mode" which allows players to practice songs for each instrument. A more complete "Drum Trainer" mode was added to Rock Band 2 to help players learn basic drum patterns and drum fills at various speeds.

=== Customization ===
Players can create and customize their own in-game character, complete with adjustable hair, body physique, clothing, tattoos, onstage movements, and instruments. (The PlayStation 2 versions and the Wii version of the original Rock Band do not have this feature.) Using cash earned within the game, the player may purchase items at the in-game "Rock Shop," with which they can customize their rock star. The game features an art maker where players can combine different clip art elements to create custom face paint, tattoos, clothing designs, instrument artwork, and band logos. Bands themselves can create their own logo, and in Rock Band 2, players can assign any generated character to "stand in" for parts that are not presently being played.

With the release of Rock Band 2, players are able to use the official Rock Band website to create physical merchandise of their characters and band, including posters, T-shirts, as well as six-inch tall figurines. The official website was well-received, receiving 2 Webby Award nominations for Best Games-Related website, and winning the 2010 Webby in this category for TheBeatlesRockBand.com. The custom merchandise service ended on March 31, 2010.

The Customization features were overhauled for the release of Rock Band 3, adding additional details to facial customization as opposed to having access only to the game's previous small selection of preset head models, and changing the method of unlocking clothing, instruments, and other accessories to the completion of several Career Goals which are typically score-based and range across the variety of instruments (including Pro Mode), game play modes, and songs from the RB3 release, previous titles, and downloadable content. There is no monetary system in RB3, however the players still earn fans as in the previous installments.

== Soundtracks ==
Rock Band, Rock Band 2, Rock Band 3, and Rock Band 4 featured soundtracks containing 58, 84, 83, and 65 songs, respectively, spanning many genres of music from the 1950s to the 2020s, and including licensed music from both well-known artists, as well as independent groups. All songs for Rock Band are master recordings, with 28 from Rock Band 1 being cover versions, listed as Wavegroup. All songs from Rock Band 2 onwards were masters.

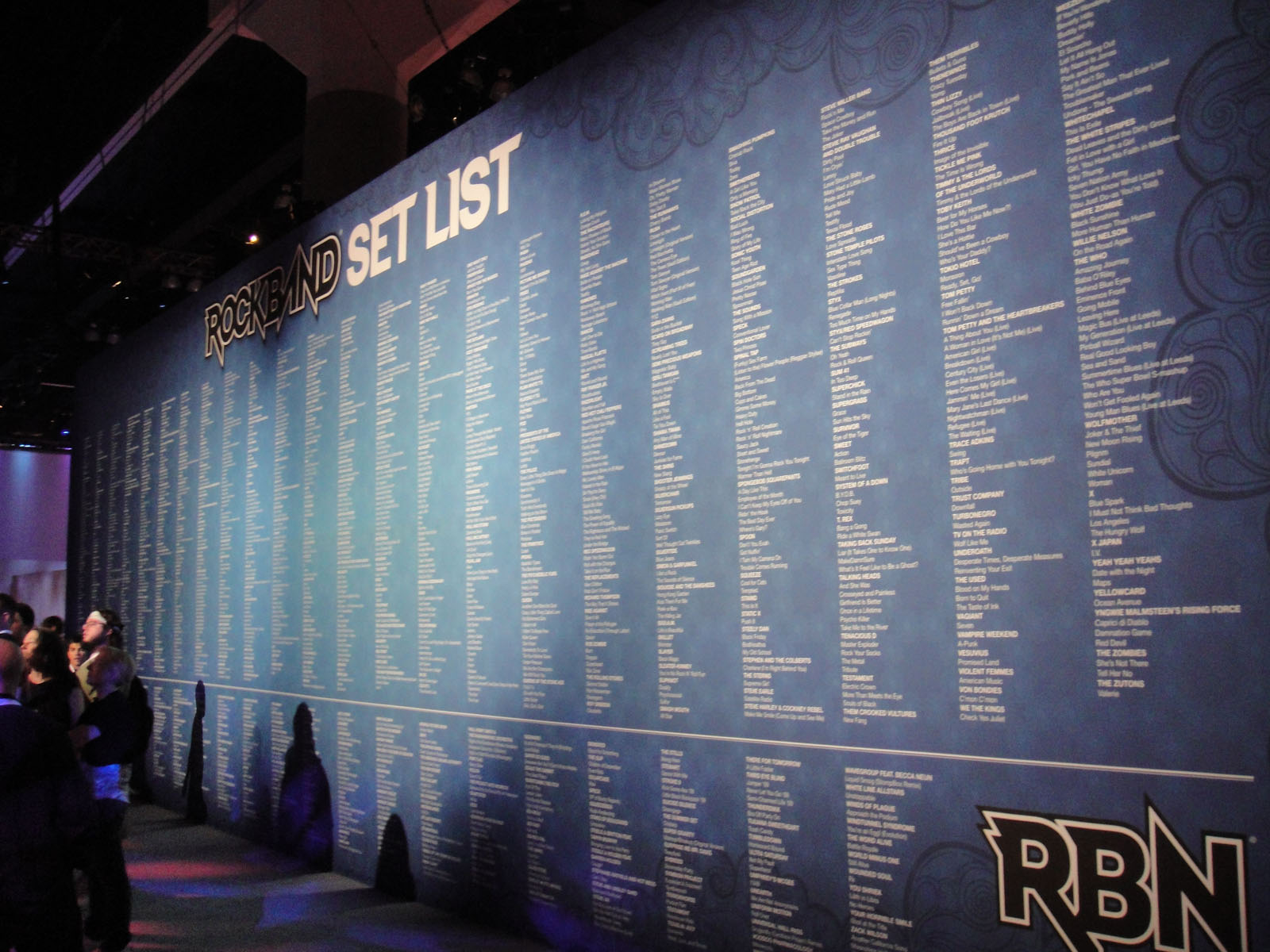
A wall display of the available songs to Rock Band 3 players as of the 2010 Electronic Entertainment Expo, with all in-game and official downloadable content on the upper portion, and the Rock Band Network songs on the bottom portion

Rock Band also supports migration of content across games. This enables players to access music that was featured in other Rock Band titles within a single game. Rock Band 2 currently supports content imported from the original Rock Band, Lego Rock Band, and Green Day: Rock Band. Rock Band 3 allows players to not only access these songs but content exported from Rock Band 2 as well. While Lego Rock Band and Green Day: Rock Band allow players to export the full soundtrack from each game, Rock Band loses three songs from its soundtrack (four in the European version) during the export process due to licensing restrictions. Rock Band 2, likewise, will not allow players to export fourteen of the eighty-four songs offered on the disc (however nine of these missing songs were offered as a free download following the release of Rock Band 3). Two additional songs from the original Rock Band export were previously unavailable within Rock Band 3, however they have since been returned to availability through a patch. Two further songs which were released on-disc in the European version are unavailable in Rock Band 3, regardless of whether the songs were obtained through a disc export or through purchase as DLC (for the North American region). Due to the licensing agreement with Apple Corps, The Beatles: Rock Band does not allow any exporting of its content whatsoever. Rock Band Blitz shipped with twenty-five songs on its soundtrack (twenty-three of which are new, two of which were offered in Rock Band 2 but not exportable to 3) and all twenty-five songs are cross-compatible with Rock Band 3. Blitz itself is also able to use the full range of content offered on the Rock Band downloadable content catalog (including future content, previous imports, and RBN songs), integrating the existing charts into its own gameplay system.

=== Downloadable songs ===
Harmonix aimed to provide a wide range of music to players through additional content, stating that Rock Band is a music platform for discovering music. New songs were released through regular weekly downloadable content (DLC), including various singles, artist packs featuring three or more songs from the artists, and full albums. Downloadable songs are compatible with all main Rock Band games. A portion of the downloadable song catalog is also compatible with Lego Rock Band, based on the songs' appropriateness for the game's family-friendly content rating. While The Beatles: Rock Band also supports downloadable content, the game does not share such content with the other Rock Band games, nor can it use content from the other Rock Band games. Green Day: Rock Band does not have its own catalog of downloadable content but a select number of songs from the 21st Century Breakdown album were released to the Music Store prior to the game's release. These songs integrate with Green Day: Rock Band, enabling the player to play the complete 21st Century Breakdown album in the game. Downloadable content released on or after October 26, 2010, is restricted for use with Rock Band 3, Rock Band Blitz, and Rock Band 4 while content released on or after October 6, 2015, is restricted for use with Rock Band 4 only.

The standard price for individual song downloads is US$1.99 per song, while some songs cost US$0.99, and some even for free. Downloads are available through PlayStation Network, Xbox Live, and Nintendo WFC. Song packs and certain singles are available at discounted prices. The price for downloadable albums varies, according to how many songs are on the album. The music can be purchased either directly from the console's online store, or through the Rock Band games directly via its own "Music Store", which allows users to preview the music prior to purchase. The Xbox 360 and PlayStation 3 versions of both games support downloading; the Wii version of Rock Band 2 also has this feature, and Harmonix has re-released existing downloaded content on the Wii over time. Wii users are only able to purchase songs through the game's Music Store, and not through the Wii Shop Channel.

With the introduction of new features in Rock Band 3, DLC began to include support, where appropriate, for vocal harmonies, keyboards, and Pro drums and Pro keyboards, and remained at the same price. Additional support for Pro guitar and bass depends on the band or song; according to MTV's Paul DeGooyer, "[many bands'] guitar parts wouldn't rise to the level that they would need to have pro mode authoring associated with them". Furthermore, the Pro guitar portion of DLC costs extra, due to the complexity of charting, which Harmonix has said takes as long as authoring the rest of the song. Older DLC can be upgraded by Harmonix to include newer features, but which songs will be a function of licensing, band cooperation, and players' preferences.

By the release of Rock Band 3, there were over 2,000 songs from over 250 different artists available for the Rock Band series through on-disc songs, imported track packs, the Rock Band Network and downloadable content, including 21 complete albums. The song "Are You Experienced?" by The Jimi Hendrix Experience, released as part of the release of the album of the same name, is credited by Harmonix as the 2,000th song for the series. Over 100 million downloadable song purchases have been made through the Rock Band music store service through May 2011.

On April 26, 2011, Harmonix released a list of the top ten selling downloadable artists. The list included the Beatles, the Who and Red Hot Chili Peppers. Other popular fan-requested bands, including Guns N' Roses and Muse, were difficult to obtain the proper licensing for and could not get additional songs into downloadable content.

Harmonix announced that the initial run of regular DLC releases would end on April 2, 2013, as the company began to transition to other projects for next-generation consoles. The final song released on its regular download release schedule was the Don McLean song "American Pie". The company did not rule out future DLC releases, and starting in January 2015, provided one-off releases of new content for the series. While Harmonix has not committed to a future Rock Band title, Rigopoulos has stated that reuse of existing downloadable content on future titles for next-generation consoles will be a priority, stating "that investment that players have made over the years in those libraries is something that we would want to take great pains to protect".

With the announcement of Rock Band 4 on March 5, 2015, Harmonix also added that the majority of existing DLC purchases would convert to the next generation. Only legacy downloadable content for Rock Band 4 is forward compatible from within the same system family (Xbox 360 downloadable content can be claimed on the Xbox One and PlayStation 3 downloadable content on the PlayStation 4) as long as the user was previously entitled to it. Premium DLC content and upgrades are still not transferable to Rock Band 4, with no intent to honor those purchases for this entire console generation.

=== Track packs ===
Harmonix has created a series of Track Packs that contain up to twenty songs previously featured as downloadable content that can be played as a standalone title with reduced features (such as no character customization and limited game modes). These titles were initially intended for users of Rock Band on platforms that lacked network capabilities, specifically the PlayStation 2 and the Wii. However, the second Track Pack was made available for all four console systems, and allows users on the Xbox 360 and PlayStation 3 to download these songs for use in the main games. A third Track Pack provides all the tracks from AC/DC's Live at Donington album in a similar manner to the second Track Pack, including exporting them to the main games. More recent Track Packs have been genre-specific such as classic rock, country, and metal. Some Track Packs had included songs not yet available through downloadable content, though Harmonix has released the exclusive tracks from the Country Track Pack and the Metal Track Pack in Music Store for purchase.

=== Rock Band Network ===
The Rock Band Network is a downloadable content service designed by Harmonix and Microsoft to allow artists and labels to author ("chart") their own songs for play in Rock Band. Using special software provided by Harmonix, these songs are peer-reviewed for content before being put on the Network, and users will be able to browse through the available songs by several means. The Network will augment the songs added by Harmonix as downloadable content for the game. The Network became publicly available to Xbox 360 players on March 4, 2010, with all of the songs immediately available to the Network Store for Xbox 360, and certain selections of songs available to the PlayStation 3 and Wii. A major update of the Network was released early in 2011, after Rock Band 3's release, to including authoring tools for normal and Pro keyboards and vocal harmonies, but will not initially support Pro guitar/bass authoring until Harmonix is able to judge the support required for these tools. Harmonix also plans to better support the PlayStation 3 through this iteration. Due to lack of interest and difficulties with Nintendo's Wii storefront, Harmonix has discontinued making Network songs available for the Wii. Xbox 360 players will still be able to create and add songs to the Rock Band Network following the April 2, 2013 end of regular DLC, but Harmonix has stated that while these mechanisms are generally automated, they are based on third-party technology like Microsoft XNA, and should those services cease, so will the functionality of the Network. As release of Network songs for the PlayStation 3 require Harmonix to be fully involved, no further Network songs will be available for the PlayStation 3 after April 2, 2013. The Network was fully shuttered in September 2014 to allow Harmonix to move forward on other projects. Rock Band Network songs were incompatible with Rock Band 4 at launch; however, Harmonix stated they would explore the logistics of bringing RBN songs into Rock Band 4 after completing the transition of all official DLC, packs, and disc exports. All RBN content was delisted on the Xbox 360 and PlayStation 3 platforms in February 2018. In May 2018, Harmonix announced that they secured licensing for a portion of the Rock Band Network library to be released as regular DLC for Rock Band 4; however, entitlements for re-released RBN content are not supported due to technical and licensing restrictions.

== Cultural impact ==
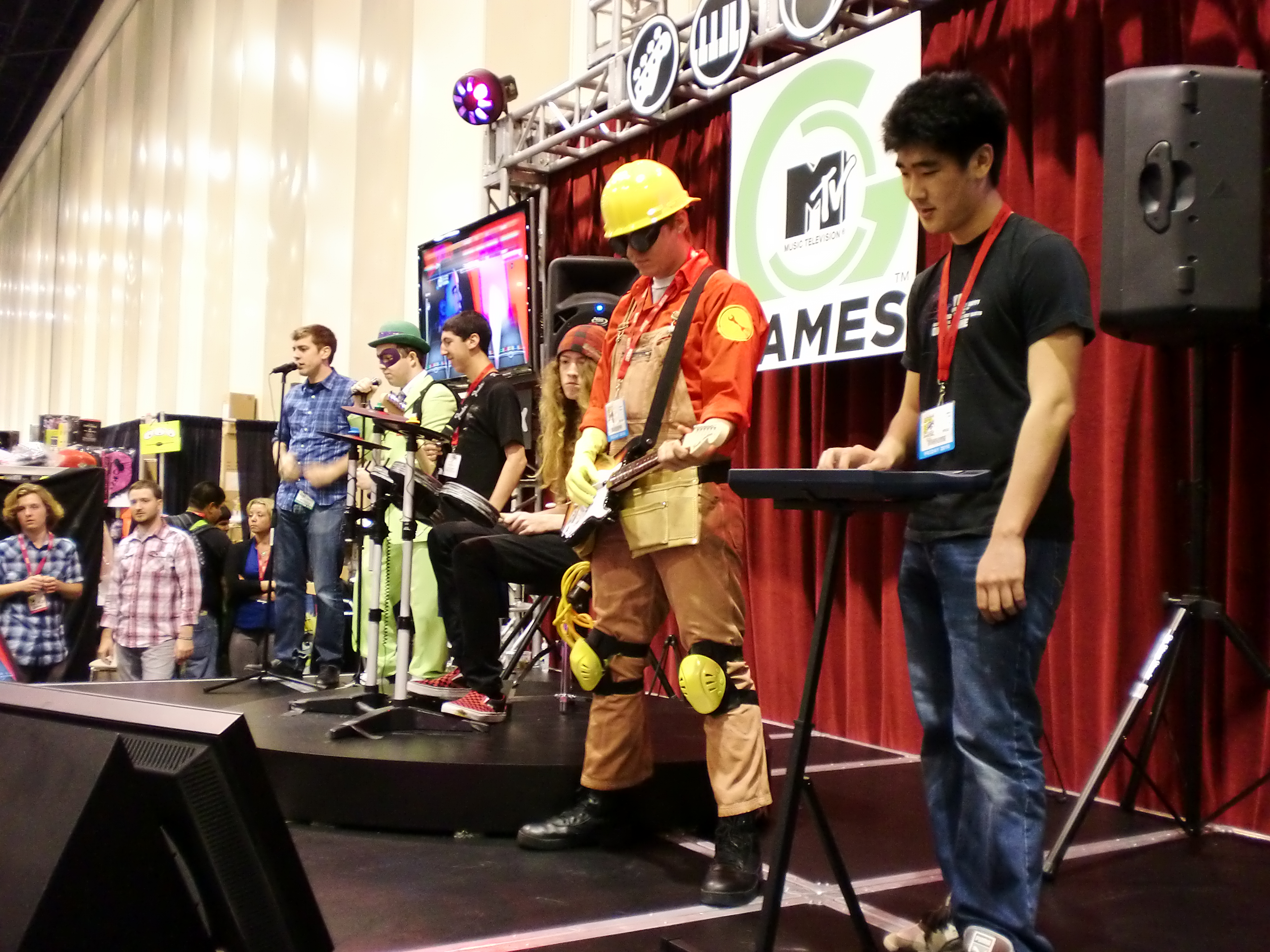
Fans try Rock Band 3 at a Comic Con convention in 2010.

Like Guitar Hero, Rock Band has influenced the music culture. Alex Rigopulos and Eran Egozy, the founders of Harmonix, were together named in Time Magazine's list of the 100 most influential people of 2008 for their creation of Rock Band. In the article, guitarist Steven Van Zandt claims, "[I]n the history of rock 'n' roll, Rock Band may just turn out to be up there with the rise of FM radio, CDs or MTV." Both were awarded the 2009 Game Developers Choice Pioneer Award for their influence on music video games culminating with Rock Band, and the 2010 USA Network's "Character Approved" Award for New Media in 2010 for the impact that their vision and leadership for Rock Band has had on the social nature of the game. A reality television show, Rock Band 2: The Stars, was created by VH1, featuring several players performing and being eliminated by judges Alice Cooper and Sebastian Bach. The Pennsylvania-based band The Jellybricks released a viral video of their song "Ruin Us" which was overplayed on footage from Rock Band 2 using avatars resembling the band members.

Rock Band appeared briefly in the "Whale Whores" episode of the animated television series South Park, where Cartman, along with Kyle and Kenny, sang to Lady Gaga's "Poker Face"; about 5 months after the airing, Harmonix announced "Poker Face" with vocals by Cartman would be available as downloadable content for the game, along with other Lady Gaga songs featuring her vocals. An episode of the sitcom The Office, "The Chump", alluded to Rock Band: Billy Joel, to which Entertainment Weekly's Darren Franich commented that "let's hope never actually exists ever". Billy Joel, on reading this review, contacted his agents and authorized his songs to be used within the game as a means to snub Franich. The Los Angeles Times suggests that Rock Band, particularly The Beatles: Rock Band, has influenced many of the contestants in the preliminaries for the 9th season of American Idol to use songs that have appeared in these games for their auditions.

In terms of sales, Rock Band trailed the Guitar Hero series, selling only 4 million units in 2007 compared to Guitar Hero's 11.8 million. In 2008, Rock Band was the third highest brand, trailing Guitar Hero and the Mario series, with $662M in total sales for the year. Over 5.3 million copies of the games were sold in 2008, with 3.8 million of those in instrument-bundled packages. Wedbush Securities gaming analyst Michael Pachter believed that both game series would sell another 3 million units each by early 2009. Regardless, Rock Band did not generate profits for Viacom due to the cost of developing and selling the instrument peripherals. As a result, Viacom, MTV Games, and Harmonix shifted the Rock Band series into one that focused on selling songs through additional software discs and downloadable content, letting others, such as Activision, handle the creation of the game controllers.

Sales of downloadable songs have been in favor of hard rock bands; Mötley Crüe's single "Saints of Los Angeles", debuting as a Rock Band track at the same time as the release of the album of the same name, saw 48,000 Rock Band downloads and 14,000 iTunes downloads during its first week of release. The popularity of some tracks have also led to groups considering releasing more material for the game. Rush's alternate version of "Working Man" released only for Rock Band was met with so much praise from players of Rock Band that the group released the song for download through iTunes, as well as considered making full albums available, which they in turn did when they released their album Moving Pictures in full on the platform soon after. Guns N' Roses had delayed their long-awaited album Chinese Democracy so often, many doubted it would ever be released; however, the Rock Band 2 debut of the song "Shackler's Revenge" was thought to be the precursor to the release of Chinese Democracy; the album was indeed released in November 2008 and was later made available as a downloadable album for the Rock Band games.

Rock Band's downloadable content has been given away as part of promotions tied in with the game. Playable tracks from Disturbed and Pearl Jam were given to customers that had purchased new albums from the respective bands in certain stores. During the summer of 2009, customers of specially marked Pepsi products had a chance to win a token to select one downloadable track out of about 300 for Rock Band in addition to other Rock Band related-prizes.

Rock Band and Guitar Hero have been stated to provide significant benefits for music labels and artists through exposure of their songs to new, younger audiences. However, not all record labels believe there are benefits; Edgar Bronfman Jr., chairman and chief executive for Warner Music Group, stated that "The amount being paid to the industry, even though their games are entirely dependent on the content that we own and control, is far too small." While industry rumors stated that MTV Games was boycotting artists under the Warner Music label over the music company's stance on licensing the issue has been stated by both MTV Games and Warner Music Group to be a present dispute over increased costs of licensed music as the two companies seek a new deal. Since then, MTV Games and Warner Music Group have entered into licensing agreements allowing music from the label, such as the band Green Day, to be used within the game.

== List of games ==
Released Year	Title	Platform										
Released Year	Title	360	XBO	PS2	PS3	PS4	PSP	Wii	NDS	Win	iOS	Mobile
Main Games
2007	Rock Band	Yes	No	Yes	Yes	No	No	Yes	No	No	No	No
2008	Rock Band 2	Yes	No	Yes	Yes	No	No	Yes	No	No	No	No
2010	Rock Band 3	Yes	No	No	Yes	No	No	Yes	Yes	No	No	No
2015	Rock Band 4	No	Yes	No	No	Yes	No	No	No	No	No	No
Band-Centric Games
2009	The Beatles: Rock Band	Yes	No	No	Yes	No	No	Yes	No	No	No	No
2010	Green Day: Rock Band	Yes	No	No	Yes	No	No	Yes	No	No	No	No
Spin-offs
2009	Lego Rock Band	Yes	No	No	Yes	No	No	Yes	Yes	No	No	No
2012	Rock Band Blitz	Yes	No	No	Yes	No	No	No	No	No	No	No
2017	Rock Band VR	No	No	No	No	No	No	No	No	Yes	No	No
Portable Games
2009	Rock Band Unplugged	No	No	No	No	No	Yes	No	No	No	No	No
2009	Rock Band Mobile	No	No	No	No	No	No	No	No	No	No	Yes
2009	Rock Band (iOS)	No	No	No	No	No	No	No	No	No	Yes	No
2010	Rock Band Reloaded	No	No	No	No	No	No	No	No	No	Yes	Yes

== See also ==
- DrumMania, a music video arcade game machine since 1998
- Rock Revolution
- Ultimate Band
- Frets on Fire
- Rocksmith
- BandFuse: Rock Legends
