= Linda Perry production discography =

Discography

Songs written, co-written and produced by Linda Perry. In 1994, she started her own record label, Rockstar Records, which initially signed Stone Fox and 2 Lane Blacktop, and released her second solo album, After Hours. Her career took a major turn in 2001 when she helped Pink find critical and commercial success, and also started working as a producer for Christina Aguilera.

== 1992 ==
=== 4 Non Blondes – Bigger, Better, Faster, More! ===
- 01. Train
- 02. Superfly
- 03. What's Up?
- 04. Pleasantly Blue
- 06. Spaceman
- 07. Old Mr. Heffer
- 08. Calling All The People
- 09. Dear Mr. President
- 10. Drifting
- 11. No Place Like Home

Tracks 1, 3, 4, 9 & 10 written by Linda Perry
Track 2 written by Linda Perry & Katrina Sirdofsky
Track 6 written by Linda Perry & Shaunna Hall
Tracks 7 & 11 written by Linda Perry, Shaunna Hall, Christa Hillhouse & Wanda Day
Track 8 written by Linda Perry, Shaunna Hall, Christa Hillhouse, Wanda Day & Dawn Richardson

== 1993 ==
=== 4 Non Blondes – Spaceman – Single ===
- 02. Strange

Written by Linda Perry & Roger Rocha

== 1995 ==
=== Janis Ian – Revenge ===
- 08. Berlin

Written by Linda Perry & Janis Ian in middle of 1995

== 1996 ==
=== Stone Fox – Stone Fox ===
- 01. Jarvina [Jarvina Cherry]
- 02. Lamby's Legs
- 03. Two Solid Weeks Of Menstruation
- 04. Shakey Egg
- 05. Untitled [Hidden Track]
- 06. Sandwich King
- 07. Poach
- 08. Puppet
- 09. Innerds
- 10. Untitled [Hidden Track]
- 11. Tiny Box Of Lies
- 12. Coke Whore
- 13. HIV+
- 14. The Smiths [Hidden Track]

Tracks 1, 2, 3, 4, 6, 8, 9, 11 & 12 mixed by Linda Perry & Devon Powers
All tracks produced by Linda Perry

=== Linda Perry – In Flight ===
- 01. In My Dreams
- 02. Freeway
- 03. Uninvited
- 04. Success
- 05. Life In A Bottle
- 06. Fill Me Up
- 07. Knock Me Out (featuring Grace Slick)
- 08. Too Deep
- 09. Taken
- 10. Fruitloop Daydream
- 11. Machine Man
- 12. In Flight

Tracks 1, 2, 3, 5, 6, 8, 9 & 12 written by Linda Perry
Track 4 written by Linda Perry & Bill Bottrell
Track 7 written by Linda Perry, Marty Wilson Piper & Grace Slick
Track 10 written by Linda Perry, Bill Bottrell, Brian MacLeod, Kevin Gilbert & Dan Schwartz
Track 11 written by Linda Perry, Brian MacLeod, Kevin Gilbert & Dan Schwartz
All tracks co-produced by Linda Perry

=== Linda Perry – Fill Me Up – Single ===
- 04. Shame (Unreleased)

Written by Linda Perry & Bill Botrell
Co-produced by Linda Perry

=== Linda Perry – Freeway – Single ===
- 04. Blow

Written by Linda Perry
Produced by Linda Perry & Bill Bottrell

== 1998 ==
=== The Waiting – Unfazed ===
- 05. I Need You
- 07. So Much Of Me

Written by Brad Olsen, Linda Perry, Brian MacLeod, Paul Ill & Eric Schermerhorn in 1998

== 1999 ==
=== Linda Perry – After Hours ===
- 01. The Garden
- 02. Jackie
- 03. Sunny April Afternoon
- 04. Lost Command
- 05. Get It While You Can
- 06. Bang The Drum
- 07. Some Days Never End
- 08. New Dawn
- 09. Fly Away
- 10. Let Me Ride
- 11. The Cows Come Home
- 12. Carry On

Tracks 1, 2, 3, 5, 6, 7, 8, 10 and 12 written by Linda Perry
Tracks 4 & 11 written by Linda Perry, Brian MacLeod & Paul Ill
Track 9 written by Linda Perry, D.C. Collard & Paul Ill
Produced by Bob Salcedo & Linda Perry

== 2001 ==
=== Pink – Missundaztood ===
- 01. Missundaztood
- 04. Get The Party Started
- 05. Respect (featuring Scratch)
- 09. Dear Diary
- 10. Eventually
- 11. Lonely Girl (featuring Linda Perry)
- 13. Gone To California
- 14. My Vietnam
- 15. Catch-22 [non-US bonus track]

Tracks 1, 5, 9, 10, 13, 14 & 15 written by Pink & Linda Perry
Tracks 4 & 11 written by Linda Perry
Tracks 1, 5, 13, 14 & 15 produced by Linda Perry & Damon Elliott
Tracks 4, 9, 10 & 11 produced by Linda Perry

== 2002 ==
=== Various Artists – Sweet Home Alabama (OST) ===
- 01. Jewel – Sweet Home Alabama

Produced by Linda Perry

=== Christina Aguilera – Stripped ===
- 11. Beautiful
- 12. Make Over
- 13. Cruz
- 19. I'm OK

Track 11 written by Linda Perry
Track 12, 13 & 19 written by Christina Aguilera & Linda Perry
Produced by Linda Perry

Make Over written by Linda Perry, Christina Aguilera, Jonathan Lipsey, Felix Howard, Cameron McVey & Paul Simm (ASCAP, 2003)

=== Solange – Solo Star ===
- 09. Wonderland

Written by Linda Perry, Solange Knowles & Rockwilder in middle of 2002

== 2003 ==
=== Lillix – Falling Uphill ===
- 01. Tomorrow

Written by Linda Perry, Louise Burns, Tasha-Ray Evin & Lacey-Lee Evin
Produced by Linda Perry

=== Various Artists – Prey For Rock & Roll (OST) ===
- 03. Gina Gershon, Linda Perry & Patty Schemel – Stupid Star

Written by Gina Gershon & Linda Perry
Original Score composed by Gina Gershon, Cheri Lovedog & Linda Perry

=== Sugababes – Three ===
- 10. Nasty Ghetto

Written by Linda Perry, Keisha Buchanan, Mutya Buena & Heidi Range
Produced by Linda Perry

=== Pink – Try This ===
- 06. Catch Me While I'm Sleeping
- 07. Waiting For Love
- 09. Try Too Hard

Tracks 6 & 9 written by Pink & Linda Perry
Track 7 written by Pink, Linda Perry, Eric Schermerhorn, Paul Ill & Brian MaCleod
Produced by Linda Perry

==== Japanese edition ====
- 14. Delirium
- 15. Free

Track 14 written by Pink & Linda Perry
Track 15 written by Pink, Linda Perry, Eric Schermerhorn, Paul Ill & Brian MacLeod
Produced by Linda Perry

=== Blaque – Torch ===
- 05. It's Not Me
- 13. Love 'Em Down

Written by Linda Perry, Natina Reed, Shamari Fears & Brandi Williams
Produced by Linda Perry

Never officially released

== 2004 ==
=== Courtney Love – America's Sweetheart ===
- 01. Mono
- 04. Sunset Strip
- 05. All The Drugs
- 07. I'll Do Anything
- 08. Uncool
- 09. Life Despite God
- 10. Hello
- 11. Zeplin Song
- 12. Never Gonna Be The Same

Track 1 written by Courtney Love, Linda Perry, Patty Schemel & Larry Schemel
Tracks 4, 7, 9, 10 & 12 written by Courtney Love, Linda Perry, Patty Schemel & Jerry Best
Track 5 written by Courtney Love, Linda Perry, Patty Schemel, Jerry Best & Chris Whitemeyer
Track 8 written by Courtney Love, Linda Perry, Bernie Taupin, Patty Schemel & Jerry Best
Track 11 written by Courtney Love & Linda Perry

Zeplin Song written by Courtney Love, Linda Perry & Samantha Maloney (ASCAP, 2006)

=== Courtney Love – Mono – Single ===
- 02. Fly
- 03. Mono (Alternate Version)

Track 2 written by Courtney Love, Linda Perry, Patty Schemel & Jerry Best
Track 3 written by Courtney Love, Linda Perry, Patty Schemel & Larry Schemel

=== Britney Spears – In The Zone (DVD): Europe Bonus CD Features ===
- 02. Girls & Boys

Written by Linda Perry
Produced by Linda Perry

=== L.P. – Suburban Sprawl & Alcohol ===
- 02. The Darkside

Written by Laura Pergolizzi & Linda Perry

=== Gwen Stefani – Love. Angel. Music. Baby. ===
- 01. What You Waiting For?
- 09. The Real Thing
- 11. Danger Zone

Tracks 1 & 9 written by Gwen Stefani & Linda Perry
Track 11 written by Gwen Stefani, Dallas Austin & Linda Perry
Track 1 co-produced by Linda Perry (uncredited)
Guitars & keyboards on track 1 engineered by Linda Perry

=== Joan Jett & The Blackhearts – Naked ===
- 05. Right In The Middle

Written by Joan Jett, Linda Perry & Kenny Laguna

=== James Blunt – Back To Bedlam ===
- 10. No Bravery

Produced by Linda Perry

== 2005 ==
=== Unwritten Law – Here's To The Mourning ===
- 06. Save Me (Wakeup Call)

Written by Scott Russo, Linda Perry & Aimee Allen
Produced by Linda Perry & Sean Beavan

=== Lisa Marie Presley – Now What ===
- 01. I'll Figure It Out
- 03. Thanx
- 04. Shine (featuring Pink (singer))
- 07. Idiot
- 08. High Enough
- 11. Now What

Lyrics by Lisa Marie Presley; music by Lisa Marie Presley & Linda Perry

=== Fischerspooner – Odyssey ===
- 04. A Kick In The Teeth
- 09. Happy (featuring Linda Perry)
- 11. All We Are

Track 4 written by Linda Perry, Warren Fischer & Casey Spooner
Tracks 9 & 11 written by Linda Perry, Nicolas Vernhes, Warren Fischer & Casey Spooner

=== Kelly Osbourne – Sleeping In The Nothing ===
- 01. One Word
- 02. Uh Oh
- 03. Redlight
- 04. Secret Lover
- 05. I Can't Wait
- 06. Edge Of Your Atmosphere
- 07. Suburbia
- 08. Don't Touch Me While I'm Sleeping
- 09. Save Me
- 10. Entropy

Tracks 1, 2, 3, 5, 8 & 10 written by Linda Perry
Tracks 4, 6, 7 & 9 written by Linda Perry & Kelly Osbourne
Produced by Linda Perry

One Word written by Billy Currie, Christopher Payne & Midge Ure (ASCAP)
Secret Lover written by Leslie Bricusse, Anthony Newley, Linda Perry & Kelly Osbourne (ASCAP)

=== Juliette & The Licks – ...Like A Bolt Of Lightning ===
- 02. Comin' Around
- 06. I Am My Fathers Daughter (Non-US Bonus Track)

Written by Juliette Lewis & Linda Perry

=== Goapele – Change It All ===
- 14. Darker Side Of The Moon

Written by Linda Perry & Goapele Mohlabane
Produced by Linda Perry

== 2006 ==
=== Skin – Fake Chemical State ===
- 07. Nothing But

Produced by Linda Perry

=== Dixie Chicks – Taking The Long Way ===
- 10. Voice Inside My Head

Written by Natalie Maines, Martie Maguire, Linda Perry, Emily Robison & Dan Wilson

=== Cheap Trick – Rockford ===
- 02. Perfect Stranger

Written by Robin Zander, Bun E. Carlos, Rick Nielsen, Linda Perry, Tom Petersson
Produced by Linda Perry

=== Joan Jett & The Blackhearts – Sinner ===
- 01. Riddles

Written by Joan Jett, Linda Perry & Kenny Laguna

=== Sierra Swan – Ladyland ===
- 01. Copper Red
- 03. Get Down To It (featuring Aimee Mann)
- 05. The Ladder
- 06. Ladyland
- 07. Trouble Is
- 09. Shakedown
- 10. Just Tell Me

Tracks 1, 9 & 10 written by Sierra Swan& Linda Perry
Track 5 written by Linda Perry
Tracks 3, 5, 6, 7, 9 & 10 produced by Linda Perry

=== Joanna – This Crazy Life ===
- 12. Miracle

Written by Linda Perry
Produced by Linda Perry

=== Christina Aguilera – Back To Basics (CD 2) ===
- 01. Enter The Circus (performed by Linda Perry)
- 02. Welcome
- 03. Candyman
- 04. Nasty Naughty Boy
- 05. I Got Trouble
- 06. Hurt
- 07. Mercy On Me
- 08. Save Me From Myself
- 09. The Right Man

Tracks 1, 3, 4, 5, 7 & 9 written by Christina Aguilera & Linda Perry
Track 2 written by Christina Aguilera, Linda Perry, Mark Ronson & Paul Ill
Track 6 written by Christina Aguilera, Linda Perry & Mark Ronson
Track 8 written by Christina Aguilera, Linda Perry & Bill Bottrell
Produced by Linda Perry

=== Christina Aguilera – Da Da Da (appeared in Pepsi commercials) ===
- Da Da Da
- Da Da Da (featuring Rain)
- Da Da Da (featuring Elissa)

Produced & recorded by Linda Perry

=== The Format – Dog Problems ===
- 08. Dead End

Written by Linda Perry, Nate Ruess & Sam Means

=== Gwen Stefani – The Sweet Escape ===
- 12. Wonderful Life

Written by Gwen Stefani & Linda Perry

=== Sierra Swan – It's A Merry Time – Digital Single ===
- 01. It's A Merry Time

Written by Linda Perry
Produced by Linda Perry

== 2007 ==
=== Various Artists – Make Some Noise / Instant Karma: The Amnesty International Campaign to Save Darfur (CD 1) ===
- 03. Christina Aguilera – Mother

Mixed, engineered & produced by Linda Perry

=== Ben Jelen – Ex-Sensitive ===
- 01. Pulse
- 02. Where Do We Go
- 03. Ex-sensitive
- 04. Counting Down
- 05. Just A Little
- 06. Not My Plan
- 07. Papa, Here I Go
- 08. Vulnerable
- 09. Mr. Philosopher
- 10. Short Of The World
- 11. Wreckage
- 12. Other Side
- 13. What Have We Done

Tracks 1, 2 & 9 written by Ben Jelen & Linda Perry
Track 4 written by Ben Jelen, Matt Scannell & Linda Perry
Tracks 5 & 6 written by Linda Perry
Produced & engineered by Linda Perry

=== The Section Quartet – Fuzzbox ===
- 01. Juicebox
- 02. No One Knows
- 03. Such Great Heights
- 04. Time Is Running Out
- 06. Paranoid Android
- 07. The Man Who Sold the World
- 08. Black Hole Sun
- 09. Heartbreaker
- 10. The Nurse Who Loved Me

Produced & engineered by Linda Perry

=== Jamie Scott & The Town – Park Bench Theories ===
- 04. Changes

Written by Jamie Scott & Linda Perry

=== Gina Gershon – In Search Of Cleo ===
- 01. Watch Over Me
- 05. Marie
- 07. La Di Da (Sunday Morning)
- 10. Fountain Of Ladies

Track 1 written by Linda Perry
Track 7 written by Gina Gershon & Linda Perry
Tracks 7 & 10 produced, mixed & engineered by Linda Perry
Track 5 engineered by Linda Perry

=== Vanessa Carlton – Heroes & Thieves ===
- 03. Spring Street
- 06. The One (with Stevie Nicks)
- 08. This Time

Tracks 3 & 8 written by Vanessa Carlton & Linda Perry
Track 6 written by Vanessa Carlton, Linda Perry & Stephan Jenkins
Tracks 3 & 8 produced & engineered by Linda Perry

=== Alicia Keys – As I Am ===
- 03. Superwoman
- 08. The Thing About Love
- 14. Sure Looks Good To Me
- 16. Doncha Know (Sky is Blue)

Track 3 written by Alicia Keys, Linda Perry, Steve Mostyn and Michael Jordan (Bauer)
Track 8 & 14 written by Alicia Keys & Linda Perry
Tracks 8,14 & 16 produced by Alicia Keys & Linda Perry

=== Celine Dion – Taking Chances ===
- 04. My Love
- 08. New Dawn

Written by Linda Perry
Produced & engineered by Linda Perry

=== The Format – B-Sides & Rarities ===
- 09. Dead End (Demo) (different from the original version)

Written by Sam Means, Linda Perry & Nate Ruess
Recorded by Linda Perry

== 2008 ==
=== Ben Jelen – Wreckage EP – Digital only ===
- 02. A Balance (Exclusive B-Side)

Produced & engineered by Linda Perry

=== Sierra Swan – Queen Of The Valley ===
- 11. Obvious Day

Written by Sierra Swan & Linda Perry
Produced by Linda Perry

=== Gavin Rossdale – Wanderlust ===
- 03. Forever May You Run

Written by Gavin Rossdale & Linda Perry

=== Christina Aguilera – Keeps Gettin' Better ===
- 01. Keeps Gettin' Better
- 02. Dynamite

Written by Christina Aguilera & Linda Perry
Produced & engineered by Linda Perry

=== Daniel Powter – Under The Radar ===
- 01. Best Of Me
- 02. Not Coming Back
- 03. Whole World Around
- 04. Next Plane Home
- 05. Am I Still The One (featuring Linda Perry)
- 06. Negative Fashion
- 07. Don't Give Up On Me
- 08. Fly Away
- 09. Beauty Queen
- 10. My So Called Life

Track 9 written by Daniel Powter & Linda Perry
Track 10 written by Linda Perry
Produced & engineered by Linda Perry

=== Giusy Ferreri – Gaetana ===
- 07. La Scala (The Ladder)
- 11. Cuore assente (The La La Song)

Written by Linda Perry
Italian translation by Tiziano Ferro

== 2009–2018 ==
=== Adam Lambert – For Your Entertainment ===
- A Loaded Smile

=== Christina Aguilera – Bionic ===
- 11. Lift Me Up

=== Reni Lane "Ready" ===
- Drive

=== Little Fish – Baffled & Beat ===
- Darling Dear
- Welcome To The Party

=== Alicia Keys – The Element of Freedom (Deluxe Edition) ===
- Pray for Forgiveness

=== Sierra Swan – Girl Who Cried Wolf ===
- 1. I Will Follow
- 2. Girl Who Cried Wolf
- 3. Who Am I
- 4. End of You
- 5. Deep Wound
- 6. The Truth Is...
- 7. Mansion Crew
- 8. Oh You
- 9. In My Room
- 10. Untitled
- 11. Blame

=== Hole – Nobody's Daughter ===
- 1. Nobody's Daughter
- 2. Skinny Little Bitch
- 3. Honey
- 4. Pacific Coast Highway
- 5. Samantha
- 6. Someone Else's Bed
- 7. For Once in Your Life
- 8. Letter to God
- 9. Loser Dust
- 10. How Dirty Girls Get Clean
- 11. Never Go Hungry
- 12. Happy Ending Story
- 13. Codine

Unreleased Tracks

- Amen
- Can You Make Me Cry
- Car Crash
- The Depths of My Despair
- Everything I Touch
- Good in Bed
- How Dirty Girls Get Clean Candy Version
- I See Red
- In My Gutters
- Last Will and Testament
- Leading Man
- The Light
- My Bedroom Walls
- Nobody's Daughter Original Version
- Number One Genius
- Pretty Your Whole Life
- Sad But True
- Stand Up Motherfucker
- Sunset Marquis
- Too Much Dope"
- Wildfire

=== Hemming – Hemming ===
2015

- 1. Hard On Myself
- 2. I'll Never Be The Man For You
- 3. Some Of My Friends
- 4. Pins and Needles
- 5. Paper Crane
- 6. Home
- 7. Vitamins
- 8. Give It Away
- 9. Said and Done
- 10. Gone

=== Miley Cyrus – Freeheld Soundtrack ===
2015

- 1. Hands Of Love

=== Adele – 25 ===
2015 Target Bonus Track

- 12. Can't Let Go

=== Dolly Parton – Dumplin' ===
2018

- 3. "Girl in the Movies"
- 4. "Red Shoes"
- 8. "Who"
- 9. "Push and Pull"
- 10. "If We Don't"
