= Philip Steir =

American drummer

- Occupation(s): Musician, remixer, songwriter, producer
- Instrument: Drums
- Years active: 1988–present

Philip Steir is an American drummer, remixer, composer and record producer.

== Life and career ==
As a drummer, he played in the critically acclaimed band Consolidated he co-founded, which was signed to Nettwerk Records and later London Records. Consolidated released five albums between 1990 and 1996. Steir co-wrote all of the band's material, as well as doing much of the producing of the band's studio work.

After the success of Steir's first remix for Consolidated, "This Is Fascism", which went to No. 1 on the U.S. Billboard dance charts, he started receiving phone calls from record labels to remix other artists on their roster. In 1996, he opened his own studio in San Francisco (Toast), where he remixed tracks for numerous top artists including No Doubt, New Order, Korn, Moby, Rob Zombie, Foreigner, Smash Mouth, Bush, Live, Cake and others.

Steir's remix of Steppenwolf's "Magic Carpet Ride", for the movie Go, set the ball in motion for many classic tracks to be remixed for movies, clubs and TV commercials. His "Magic Carpet Ride" remix was licensed by Dodge and then Skechers for both of the companies major television advertisement campaigns. It was also used in other films and TV shows.

Steir's reputation as a remixer eventually led to production work. He produced the Grammy-nominated album Arepa 3000 (best alternative Latin album) in 2001, for the Venezuelan band, Los Amigos Invisibles. The album was also nominated for a Latin Grammy Award as best rock album.

Steir also produced the majority of tracks on the Maverick debut album Falling Uphill for Lillix. Falling Uphill was an international success spawning hits in the United States, Canada and Asia. The album has now been certified gold in Japan. The success of the song "What I Like About You", which Steir produced for the TV show of the same name, was also the hit song in the movie and soundtrack for Freaky Friday. When the band No Doubt started work on their Rock Steady album, they began first in San Francisco recording with Steir at his studio where the song "Hey Baby" was born, and eventually went on to win the 2003 Grammy Award for Best Pop Performance by a Duo or Group with Vocals.

Steir was also the music producer and music supervisor for The WB TV Network's image campaigns, producing the theme music for five seasons of the network's image campaign. The campaigns in which Steir did the music for won both he and the network 4 Promax Awards for best Network promo.

Steir is now living in Los Angeles, where his reputation for remixing classic tracks for film and TV led him to develop a project for Warner Brothers Records to remix past hit songs from the Warner Bros tape vaults / back catalog. The album, What Is Hip?, released on Warner Bros Records and whose title track was nominated for a Grammy in 2006 featured songs by America, The Doobie Brothers, Rod Stewart, George Benson, Ambrosia and Tower of Power. The album included remixes by other top producers and DJs. It was conceived and executive-produced by Steir, as was his remix of the Devo track "Whip It" and Todd Rundgren's "Hello It's Me," from the project which have been receiving license sync's from film, TV and ad campaigns. Steir's remix of Seals and Crofts's song "Summer Breeze" was prominently featured in a summer ad campaign for Gap and was a comeback hit on AC radio.

After remixing the same theme song he originally produced for the WB TV series What I Like About You, Steir was asked by the shows producers if he would join the show as composer, music producer, and music supervisor and has just completed his third season on the hit series.

Steir has completed work on a remix project for Rhino/Warner Music Group, for which he remixed and executive produced a project featuring hits by the Bee Gees.

In the early 2010s, Steir has co-created 'Flow Play' with Derek Beres. Flow Play fuses yoga together with world music.

== Discography ==
As a producer:

• "Until You", "Remember", and "I Got You" by David de Lautour (from What I Like About You)
• "Ultraviolet" by David de Lautour with Joanna Pacitti (from What I Like About You)
• "The Meaning" by Lillix (from The Princess Diaries 2: Royal Engagement: Original Soundtrack)
• "This Town" by Lillix (Rich Girls theme song)
• "My Favorite Dream" by Junk
• "Life Is Good" by Junk
• Falling Uphill by Lillix (additional production for "Fork in the Road")
• Engage by PAX217
• Rock Steady by No Doubt (additional production for "Hey Baby")
• Athenaeum by Athenaeum
• Arepa 3000 by Los Amigos Invisibles
• Stand In Traffic by Magnified
• "Horses" by Black Lab (from Permanent Midnight: Original Soundtrack)
• "My Generation" by Eden's Crush and Hesher (The WB brand image theme from 2001 to 2002)
• "Oh, What a Night" by Vitamin C (The WB brand image theme from 2000 to 2001)
• Unravel EP by Penny Dreadfuls
• The Distance to Here by Live (additional production for "Voodoo Lady")
• Kiss My Acid Jazz by Junk
• Illusion by Soulstice (co-producer for "Wind")
• "Mindless" by Mindless from Cool World: Original Soundtrack
• "Laughing" by Traci Lords
• I'd Rather Eat Glass by Bijou Phillips (selected tracks)
• "Anywhere But Now" by Butterfly Jones
• "Sex Drive" EP by Grace Jones

As a remixer:

• "To Victory" (Philip Steir's Sacrifice for Sparta Remix) from 300 Original Motion Picture Soundtrack
• "You Should Be Dancing" (Jason Bentley/Philip Steir Remix) from Bee Gees Greatest
• "Express Yourself" (Philip Steir's Everybody on the Phloor Mix) by Charles Wright & the Watts 103rd Street Rhythm Band
• "Summer Breeze" (Tsuper Tsunami Mix) by Seals and Crofts
• "Whip It" (Remix) by Devo
• "Hello It's Me" (Hello It's Me, Again Remix) by Todd Rundgren
• "What I Like About You" by Lillix (Remix for the theme of the TV series of the same name)
• "Life Is Good" by Junk for Agent Cody Banks: Original Soundtrack
• "Hey Baby" (Phillip Steir's Girls Like the Bass in the Back Remix) by No Doubt
• "New" (New & Approved Remix) by No Doubt
• "Ex-Girlfriend" (The Psycho Ex Mix) by No Doubt
• "Magic Carpet Ride" (Steir's Mix) by Steppenwolf from Go (Music from the Motion Picture)
• "True Faith" (Philip Steir's Re-Order Mix) by New Order
• "Make Me Bad" (Kornography Mix) by Korn
• "The Ballad of Joe and Rosa Whore" (Ilsa She-Wolf of Hollywood Mix) by Rob Zombie from American Made Music to Strip By
• "Hot Blooded" (Philip Steir Remix) by Foreigner from Osmosis Jones
• "Stitches" (Smack My Stitch Up Extended Mix) by Orgy
• "Blisters on My Brain" (Philip Steir Mix) by Lo Fidelity Allstars
• "Synapse" (Philip Steir's My Ghost in the Bush of Life Mix) by Bush from Deconstructed
• "More Than I Can" (Philip Steir Mix) by Jane Jensen
• "Walkin' on the Sun" (Feet Beat Manifesto Mix) by Smash Mouth
• "Daria" by Cake
• "Pepper" (Comin' Down the Mountain Mix) by Butthole Surfers
• "Gorgeous" by theSTART
• "Steal My Sunshine" (Steal My Club Mix)/(More And More Instrumental) by Len
• "Freaks" (Labor, Labor, Labor Remix) by Live
• "Lakini's Juice" (Remix) by Live
• "That's When I Reach for My Revolver" (Psychotic Ve-Gun Mix) by Moby
• "Dear God" by Shootyz Groove
• "Have Fun, Go Mad" by Blair
• "I Find (I'm Fine)" by Getaway Cruiser
• "Let's Get Down" by Getaway Cruiser
• "Something Got Me" (Curse Of The Voodoo Swamp Mix) by Lori Carson
• "Did It Again" (Did It Four Times Mix) by Kylie Minogue
• "Too Far" (Inner Door Mix/North Pole Mix) by Kylie Minogue
• "Lenses" by Red Five
• "Sick and Beautiful" by Artificial Joy Club
• "Numb II" (Dinkadelic Mix) by Dink
• "Drive" by Dink
• "Cloud Eyes" by Qkumba Zoo
• "Catch Me" (San Francisco Loop Mix) by Chimera
• "Scratch" by Ryan Downe
• "Meltdown" by Lisa Gerrard from The Insider: Original Soundtrack
• "Who's Feelin' It" (Philip's Psycho Mix) by Tom Tom Club from American Psycho: Music from the Controversial Motion Picture
• "Junkie" (Dancing All By Yourself Remix)/(Club Addict Remix – Filthy) by Slowrush
• "Things I've Seen" (Philip Steir's Spooktacular Bomb Mix) by The Spooks
• "Friends' Medley" by Lisa Kudrow
• "Normal Town" by Better Than Ezra from An American Werewolf in Paris: Original Soundtrack
• "Amnesia" (Random Access Memory Loss Mix) by Chumbawamba
• "Let My Love Open the Door" by Pete Townshend
• "This Is Fascism" by Consolidated
• "Get Rhythm" (Philip Steir Remix) by Johnny Cash

== Awards and recognition ==
Awards and nominations
• Los Amigos Invisibles, "Arepa 3000", 2001, Best Rock Album nominee
• Los Amigos Invisibles, "Arepa 3000", 2001, Best Alternative Latin album nominee

Bammie Awards and Nominations
• Junk, "Kiss My Acid Jazz", 1997, Outstanding Jazz Band nominee
• Junk, "Kiss My Acid Jazz", 1997, Outstanding Jazz Album nominee

Other recognition
• Winner of 4 Promax awards for best Network promo, The WB TV Network
