= Here I Am (Dolly Parton song) =

1971 song by Dolly Parton

Song by Dolly Parton

from the album Coat of Many Colors
- Released: October 4, 1971
- Recorded: April 27, 1971
- Studio: RCA Studio A, Nashville, Tennessee
- Genre: Country
- Length: 3:19
- Label: RCA Victor
- Songwriter: Dolly Parton
- Producer: Bob Ferguson

"Here I Am" is a song written and recorded by American singer-songwriter Dolly Parton. The song was included on her 1971 album Coat of Many Colors. It was recorded on April 27, 1971, at RCA Studio B in Nashville, Tennessee, and produced by Bob Ferguson.

== Personnel ==
Adapted from the album liner notes and RCA recording session records.

- David Briggs – piano
- Jerry Carrigan – drums
- Pete Drake – steel
- Bobby Dyson – bass
- Bob Ferguson – producer
- Johnny Gimble – fiddle
- Dave Kirby – guitar
- George McCormick – guitar
- Mack Magaha – fiddle
- The Nashville Edition – background vocals
- Dolly Parton – lead vocals, writer
- Hargus Robbins – piano
- Billy Sanford – guitar
- Jerry Shook – guitar
- Buddy Spicher – fiddle
- Buck Trent – electric banjo

== 2018 version ==
"Here I Am"

Single by Dolly Parton and Sia

from the album Dumplin'
- Released: September 14, 2018
- Recorded: 2018
- Studio: Greenleaf Studio; Blackbird Studio
- Genre: Country
- Length: 4:32
- Label: Dolly; RCA Nashville
- Songwriter: Dolly Parton
- Producer: Linda Perry

Dolly Parton singles chronology
"The Story" (2017)	"Here I Am" (2018)	"Girl in the Movies" (2018)

Sia singles chronology
"Flames" (2018)	"Here I Am" (2018)	"I'm Still Here" (2018)

Music video
- "Here I Am" on YouTube

In 2018 Parton re-recorded the song as a duet with Australian singer-songwriter Sia for the soundtrack to the 2018 Netflix film, Dumplin'. It was produced by Linda Perry and released as the first single from the soundtrack on September 14, 2018.

=== Critical reception ===
Upon its release the single received positive reviews from music critics. Writing for Rolling Stone, Althea Legaspi said Parton and Sia's "voices meld together, giving it a hymnal quality, buoyed by gospel-styled choir backing vocals." In a review for NPR Lars Gotrich noted the song's slower tempo compared to the original 1971 recording, calling the single "a gospel-infused statement of purpose."

On a list of the 50 best Dolly Parton songs, Rolling Stone magazine ranked "Here I Am" at number 25, calling the Sia collaboration a beautiful amplification of the "desires and assurances of the original."

=== Commercial performance ===
The single sold 10,000 copies during its first week of release. It debuted and peaked at No. 37 on the US Billboard Hot Country Songs chart.

=== Music video ===
The music video for the song was released on November 2, 2018. Neither Parton nor Sia appear in the video which follows a mourner visiting a grave, a homeless man begging for change, a child cowering in fear as her mother is abused, and an elderly woman sick in bed. It focuses on the evolution of the characters introduced at the beginning, and leaves viewers with an uplifting message of hope.

=== Personnel ===
Adapted from the album liner notes.

- Chris Allgood – mastering assistant
- David Angell – violin
- Sean Badum – string recording assistant
- Avery Bright – viola
- Billy Bush – mixing
- David Davidson – violin
- Luke Edgemon – background vocals
- Damon Fox – piano, B3 organ, electric guitar
- Luis Flores – assistant engineer
- David Goldstein – drums
- Austin Hoke – cello, string arrangements
- Emily Lazar – mastering
- Briana Lee – background vocals
- John McBride – string recording
- Billy Mohler – bass
- Emily Nelson – cello
- Dolly Parton – lead vocals
- Linda Perry – producer, engineer
- Eli Pearl – electric guitar, acoustic guitar
- Sia – lead vocals
- Maiya Skykes – background vocals
- Katelyn Westergard – violin
- Kristin Weber – violin
- Kristin Wilkinson – viola

=== Charts ===
Chart (2018)	Peak position
UK Singles Sales (OCC)	93
US Hot Country Songs (Billboard)	37
