= A Friend Like You =

A Friend Like You may refer to:

- "A Friend Like You", 2004 song from Brian Wilson's album Gettin' In over My Head
- "A Friend Like You", 2017 song from Dolly Parton's album I Believe in You
- "A Friend Like You", 2017 song by Andy Grammer from the soundtrack to the film Captain Underpants: The First Epic Movie
