= Dumplin' (soundtrack) =

2018 film soundtrack

Soundtrack album by Dolly Parton
- Released: November 30, 2018
- Recorded: 2018
- Studios: Greenleaf Studio; Blackbird Studios
- Genre: Country
- Length: 40:06
- Labels: Dolly Records; RCA Records
- Producer: Linda Perry

Dolly Parton chronology
I Believe in You (2017)	Dumplin' (2018)	A Holly Dolly Christmas (2020)

Singles from Dumplin'
- 1. "Here I Am" Released: September 14, 2018; 2. "Girl in the Movies" Released: November 2, 2018; 3. "Jolene (New String Version)" Released: November 16, 2018

Professional ratings
Review scores
Source	Rating
Metro Weekly	4/4 stars
The Spill Magazine	3/5 stars

Dumplin' is the soundtrack album by American country music singer-songwriter Dolly Parton for the 2018 film of the same name. It was released on November 30, 2018, by Dolly Records and RCA Records. The album features guest performances by Elle King, Alison Krauss, Miranda Lambert, Sia, Mavis Staples and Rhonda Vincent, among others.

"Girl in the Movies" received a nomination for Best Original Song at the 2019 Golden Globes.

== Release and promotion ==
The album was announced on September 12, 2018, along with its lead single, "Here I Am", which was released on September 14. A music video for "Here I Am" was released on November 2 via Parton's Vevo channel.

On October 22, 2018, Parton revealed the album’s cover art and track listing, as well as announcing that the album would be available for pre-order on November 2 and that the second single, "Girl in the Movies", would be available the same day. The music video for "Girl in the Movies" was released on November 19 via Parton's Vevo channel.

The New String Version of "Jolene" was released as the third single from the album on November 16, 2018. The music video, featuring footage from the Dolly & Friends: The Making of a Soundtrack special, was released on November 26.

On November 25, Parton began posting 15-second snippets of songs from the album on Twitter, beginning with "Why". This was followed by "Two Doors Down" on November 26, "If We Don't" on November 27, and "Dumb Blonde" on November 28.

On November 29, 2018, CMT aired a television special titled Dolly & Friends: The Making of a Soundtrack, which featured a behind the scenes look at the recording of the album.

Parton promoted the album with an appearance on NBC's Today on November 30, where she was interviewed and performed "Girl in the Movies". She was also interviewed on Today with Kathie Lee and Hoda the same day. That evening she appeared on The Tonight Show Starring Jimmy Fallon, where she performed a medley of Christmas songs with Fallon, in addition to being interviewed and performing "Girl in the Movies".

== Content ==
Six of the songs on the album are new versions of songs Parton had previously recorded.

- "Here I Am" was previously recorded for the 1971 album Coat of Many Colors.
- "Holdin' on to You" was previously recorded for the 1977 album New Harvest...First Gathering.
- "Dumb Blonde" was previously recorded for the 1967 album Hello, I'm Dolly.
- "Here You Come Again" was previously recorded for the 1977 album of the same name.
- "Two Doors Down" was previously recorded for the 1977 album Here You Come Again. Parton would re-record the song for its 1978 single release. This re-recorded version replaced the original on all subsequent releases of the album.
- "Jolene" has been previously recorded by Parton six times. Originally recorded for the 1974 album of the same name, Parton re-recorded the song in 1995 for her album Something Special. Parton also provided vocals on Mindy Smith’s 2004 recording for her album One Moment More. Parton was featured on Straight No Chaser’s 2013 recording of the song for their album Under the Influence. In 2014 Parton was featured on Mary Sarah’s recording for her album Bridges. Pentatonix recorded a Grammy-winning cover of the song featuring Parton in 2016 and included it on their 2017 EP PTX, Vol. IV – Classics.

== Commercial performance ==
The album's first single, "Here I Am", was released in September 2018 and peaked at No. 37 on the US Billboard Hot Country Songs chart. The album has sold 23,200 copies in the United States as of March 2019.

== Track listing ==
Dumplin' track listing
No.	Title	Writer(s)	Length
1.	"Here I Am" (with Sia)	Dolly Parton	4:32
2.	"Holdin' on to You" (with Elle King)	Parton	3:27
3.	"Girl in the Movies"	Parton; Linda Perry	4:34
4.	"Red Shoes"	Parton; Perry	2:58
5.	"Why" (with Mavis Staples)	Parton	2:29
6.	"Dumb Blonde" (with Miranda Lambert)	Curly Putman	2:34
7.	"Here You Come Again" (with Willa Amai)	Barry Mann; Cynthia Weil	3:28
8.	"Who"	Parton; Perry	2:37
9.	"Push and Pull" (with Jennifer Aniston and Danielle Macdonald)	Parton; Perry	3:33
10.	"If We Don't" (with Rhonda Vincent and Alison Krauss)	Parton; Perry	2:28
11.	"Two Doors Down" (with Macy Gray and Dorothy)	Parton	4:06
12.	"Jolene" (New String Version)	Parton	3:20
Total length:			40:06

Streaming edition bonus tracks
No.	Title	Writer(s)	Length
13.	"Here You Come Again" (Dumplin' Remix)	Mann; Weil	1:57
14.	"Jolene" (Dumplin' Remix)	Parton	3:24
15.	"9 to 5"	Parton	2:42
16.	"Dumb Blonde"	Putman	2:30
17.	"Two Doors Down"	Parton	3:04
18.	"Jolene"	Parton	2:41
19.	"Here You Come Again"	Mann; Weil	2:25
20.	"Holdin' on to You"	Parton	2:47
21.	"Just Because I'm a Woman"	Parton	3:03
22.	"Better Get to Livin'"	Parton; Kent Wells	3:35
23.	"High and Mighty" (with the Christ Church Choir)	Parton	3:09
Total length:			71:23

== Personnel ==
Adapted from the album liner notes.

- Chris Allgood - mastering assistant
- Willa Amai - vocals, piano
- David Angell - violins
- Jennifer Aniston - background vocals
- Sean Badum - string and horn recording assistant, engineering assistant
- Avery Bright - violas
- Billy Bush - mixing
- David Davidson - violins
- Allen Ditto - mixing assistant
- DOROTHY - vocals
- Luke Edgemon - background vocals
- Luis Flores - engineering assistant
- Damon Fox - piano, B3 organ, electric guitar, acoustic guitar, keys
- David Goodstein - drums
- Macy Gray - vocals
- Barry Green - trombone
- Rob Tshaya - album cover photo
- Austin Hoke - cellos, string arrangements
- Jim Hoke - string arrangement, tenor sax, arranger, horn arrangements
- Elle King - vocals
- Alison Krauss - fiddle
- Betsy Lamb - viola
- Miranda Lambert - vocals
- Emily Lazar - mastering
- Briana Lee - background vocals
- Sam Levine - baritone sax
- Danielle Macdonald - background vocals
- John McBride - string and horn recording, mixing, engineering
- Billy Mohler - bass
- Emily Nelson - cellos
- Dolly Parton - lead vocals, executive producer
- Steve Patrick - trumpet
- Linda Perry - producer, engineer, acoustic guitar, background vocals
- Eli Pearl - electric guitar, acoustic guitar, pedal steel guitar
- Cheryl Riddle - hair
- JB Rowland - packaging design
- Sia - vocals
- Mavis Staples - vocals
- Steve Summers - wardrobe design
- Maiya Sykes - background vocals
- Rhonda Vincent - mandolin
- Lisa Vitale - background vocals
- Kristen Weber - violins
- Katelyn Westergard - violins
- Kristin Wilkinson - violas

== Charts ==
Album

Chart (2018)	Peak position
Australian Albums (ARIA)	119
Australian Country Albums (ARIA)	9
UK Country Albums (Official Charts)	2
UK Soundtrack Albums (Official Charts)	8
US Billboard 200	143
US Americana/Folk Albums (Billboard)	4
US Soundtrack Albums (Billboard)	7
US Top Country Albums (Billboard)	16

Chart (2026)	Peak position
Irish Albums (Official Charts)	45

Singles

Title	Year	Chart	Peak position
"Here I Am"	2018	US Hot Country Songs (Billboard)	37
