= Girl in the Movies =

2018 song by Dolly Parton

Single by Dolly Parton

from the album Dumplin'
- Released: November 2, 2018
- Recorded: 2018
- Studio: Greenleaf Studio; Blackbird Studio
- Genre: Country
- Length: 4:34
- Label: Dolly; RCA Nashville
- Songwriters: Dolly Parton; Linda Perry
- Producer: Linda Perry

Dolly Parton singles chronology
"Here I Am" (2018)	"Girl in the Movies" (2018)	"Smoky Mountain Rain" (2019)

Music video
- "Girl in the Movies" on YouTube

"Girl in the Movies" is a song by American singer-songwriter Dolly Parton. It was written by Parton and Linda Perry for the soundtrack of the 2018 Netflix film, Dumplin'. The song was produced by Perry and released as the second single from the soundtrack on November 2, 2018. It was nominated for Best Original Song at the 76th Golden Globe Awards and Best Song Written for Visual Media at the 62nd Annual Grammy Awards.

== Critical reception ==
In a review for Rolling Stone, Stephen L. Betts called the song "a dreamy ballad, both literally and figuratively," praising the song's lyrical structure and its movie theatre metaphors. Writing for Wide Open Country, Bobbie Jean Sawyer gave a positive review of the song, saying that it is a song "for any daydreamer who's escaped to the movies to wonder what it would be like to shine like your favorite characters on the silver screen."

== Music video ==
The song's music video was released on November 19, 2018. The black and white video depicts Parton playing an acoustic guitar and performing the song with color clips from the film interspersed throughout.

== Live performances ==
Parton performed the song live for the first time on October 22, 2018, accompanied by Perry on guitar, at a luncheon for the Netflix film Dumplin' at Four Seasons Hotel Los Angeles at Beverly Hills in Los Angeles. On November 30, Parton performed the song on NBC's Today. That evening she appeared on The Tonight Show Starring Jimmy Fallon, where she performed a medley of Christmas songs with Fallon, in addition to being interviewed and performing "Girl in the Movies". Parton also performed the song on The Ellen DeGeneres Show on December 6.

== Personnel ==
Adapted from the album liner notes.

- Chris Allgood – mastering assiatant
- David Angell – violin
- Sean Badum – string recording assistant
- Avery Bright – viola
- Billy Bush – mixing
- David Davidson – violin
- Luis Flores – assistant engineer
- Damon Fox – B3 organ
- David Goldstein – drums
- Austin Hoke – cello, string arrangements
- Emily Lazar – mastering
- Briana Lee – background vocals
- John McBride – string recording
- Billy Mohler – bass
- Emily Nelson – cello
- Eli Pearl – pedal steel guitar
- Linda Perry – acoustic guitar, writer, producer, engineer
- Maiya Sykes – background vocals
- Kristin Weber – violin
- Katelyn Westergard – violin
- Kristin Wilkinson – viola
