= Ramble in Music City: The Lost Concert =

Live album by Emmylou Harris and The Nash Ramblers
- Released: September 3, 2021
- Recorded: September 28, 1990
- Venue: Tennessee Performing Arts Center, Nashville, Tennessee, United States
- Genre: Country
- Length: 75:55
- Language: English
- Label: Nonesuch
- Producer: Allen Reynolds (original recordings); James Austin and Emmylou Harris (for release)

Emmylou Harris and The Nash Ramblers chronology
The Complete Trio Collection (2016)	Ramble in Music City: The Lost Concert (2021)

Ramble in Music City: The Lost Concert is a 2021 live album from American country musician Emmylou Harris, backed by The Nash Ramblers. The recording was unearthed by James Austin of Rhino Records and represents a different sound for Harris that included a new backing band.

== Reception ==
Writing for American Songwriter, Lee Zimmerman gave this album four out of five stars for "pristine" sound that "gives her fans and collectors an opportunity to delve into a critical chapter in Harris’ ever-shifting career" that has "depth and diversity".

== Track listing ==
1. "Roses in the Snow" (Ruth Franks) – 2:33
2. "Even Cowgirls Get the Blues" (Rodney Crowell) – 3:09
3. "Beneath Still Waters" (Dallas Frazier) – 4:07
4. "If I Could Only Win Your Love" (Charlie Louvin and Ira Louvin) – 2:34
5. "Amarillo" (Crowell and Emmylou Harris) – 2:48
6. "The Other Side of Life" (Alan O'Bryant) – 2:57
7. "If I Needed You" (Townes Van Zandt) – 3:42
8. "Two More Bottles of Wine" (Delbert McClinton) – 2:58
9. "Mystery Train" (Herman Parker) – 2:32
10. "My Songbird" (Jesse Winchester) – 3:28
11. "Wayfaring Stranger" (John Wyeth) – 3:24
12. "Green Pastures" (traditional) – 3:26
13. "Blue Kentucky Girl" (Johnny Mullins) – 3:07
14. "Hello Stranger" (A. P. Carter) – 3:37
15. "Remington Ride" (Herb Remington) – 2:46
16. "One of These Days" (Earl Montgomery) – 2:53
17. "The Boxer" (Paul Simon) – 2:54
18. "Born to Run" (Paul Kennerly) – 3:47
19. "The Price I Pay" (Bill Parker Wildes and Christopher Hillman) – 5:03
20. "Sweet Dreams" (Don Gibson) – 3:55
21. "Save the Last Dance for Me" (Doc Pomus and Mort Shuman) – 3:17
22. "Leaving Louisiana in the Broad Daylight" (Donovan Cowart and Crowell) – 3:19
23. "Boulder to Birmingham" (Bill Danoff and Harris) – 3:38

== Personnel ==
- Emmylou Harris – guitar, vocals, production (for release)
- Larry Atamanuik – drums
- Sam Bush – fiddle, mandolin
- Roy Huskey Jr. – bass guitar
- Al Perkins – dobro, banjo, vocals
- Jon Randall Stewart – acoustic guitar, mandolin, vocals

Technical personnel

- James Austin – production (for release)
- Matt "Buster" Allen – engineering assistance
- Michael Carney – art direction, design
- Eric Conn – mastering at Independent Mastering
- Mark Miller – engineering, mixing at Allentown Studios
- Allen Reynolds – production (original recordings)
- Johnny Rosen – engineering

== See also ==
- List of 2021 albums

== Release history ==
Release history and formats for Ramble In Music City: The Lost Concert
Region	Date	Format	Label	Ref.
North America	September 3, 2021	LP; CD	Nonesuch Records	
