= Into the Maelstrom (album) =

Studio album by Bigelf
- Released: March 3, 2014
- Genre: Progressive rock, psychedelic rock, progressive metal
- Length: 62:20
- Label: Inside Out Music

Bigelf chronology
Cheat the Gallows (2008)	Into the Maelstrom (2014)

Professional ratings
Review scores
Source	Rating
Thrash Hits	5/6 stars

Into the Maelstrom is the fourth studio album by American psychedelic/progressive rock band Bigelf, released in Europe on March 3, 2014, and in North America on April 1. It is their first album since August 2008, their longest non-album gap, and the first since the departure of longtime members Steve Frothingham and Ace Mark. They have since been replaced by guitarist Luis Maldonado (Glenn Hughes, James LaBrie, UFO) and guest drummer Mike Portnoy (ex-Dream Theater, Transatlantic, Flying Colors, Adrenaline Mob). The album comes in a limited edition with a bonus CD containing remixes and demo versions, as well as a 2-LP vinyl edition with the full album on CD.

Into the Maelstrom is Bigelf's first album released by the record label Inside Out Music, which specializes in progressive rock.

== Context and music ==
Into the Maelstorm was released six years after their previous studio album, Cheat the Gallows, which had two successful singles and helped them achieve supporting act status for more established progressive groups such as Dream Theater and Porcupine Tree. However, they were dropped from their label Custard and later conflicts within the members rose mostly due to creative differences and salary disputes, which was made worse by personal problems that members were facing at the time. All of this prevented them from using the album's success to propel them further.

Bassist Duffy Snowhill insisted that they continued with the band, but Fox wanted to jam under a different moniker. It wasn't until guest drummer Mike Portnoy encouraged Fox not to abandon Bigelf that he decided to resume the carry on with the name.

When discussing the influences on the album, Fox told Prog magazine that they were listening to "a lot of Rage Against the Machine, System of a Down and more aggressive, non-retro rock music" and that he was trying to make Bigelf "the Radiohead of metal".

Three songs of the album ("The Professor & the Madman", "High" and "Mr. Harry McQuhae") were written after former guitarist A.H.M. Butler-Jones, who fell in a coma in 2001 and died in 2009. The song "Theater of Dreams" is a tribute to Portnoy, focusing on criticism that he received after leaving his then-previous band Dream Theater, although Fox admits that his own story was reflected in the lyrics, as well.

== Track listing ==
All tracks are written by Damon Fox.

No.	Title	Length
1.	"Incredible Time Machine"	3:57
2.	"Hypersleep"	5:38
3.	"Already Gone"	3:29
4.	"Alien Frequency"	4:15
5.	"The Professor & the Madman"	6:00
6.	"Mr. Harry McQuhae"	6:14
7.	"Vertigod"	3:58
8.	"Control Freak"	2:52
9.	"High"	7:11
10.	"Edge of Oblivion"	6:34
11.	"Theater of Dreams"	4:02
12.	"ITM": "I. Destination Unknown"; "II. Harbinger of Death"; "III. Memories"	8:10

Bonus tracks
No.	Title	Length
13.	"Control Freak (Freak Mix)"	3:09
14.	"Control Freak (Remix)"	2:51
15.	"Alien Frequency (Remix)"	4:15

== Personnel ==
- Damon Fox – vocals, guitar, keyboards
- Luis Maldonado – guitar
- Duffy Snowhill – bass
- Mike Portnoy – drums
- Steve Linsley – engineer
