= Cheat the Gallows =

Studio album by Bigelf
- Released: August 12, 2008
- Recorded: at Kung Fu Gardens, North Hollywood in 2006–2007
- Genre: Progressive rock, psychedelic rock, progressive metal
- Length: 56:53
- Label: Custard Records
- Producer: Damon Fox

Bigelf chronology
Hex (2003)	Cheat the Gallows (2008)	Into the Maelstrom (2014)

Professional ratings
Review scores
Source	Rating
AllMusic	3.5/5 stars
PopMatters	7/10 stars

Cheat the Gallows is the third studio album by American progressive rock/progressive metal band Bigelf.

== Track listing ==
All tracks are written by Damon Fox, except where noted

No.	Title	Length
1.	"Gravest Show on Earth"	5:00
2.	"Blackball"	7:02
3.	"Money, It's Pure Evil"	3:18
4.	"The Evils of Rock & Roll" (Fox, Steve Frothingham, John Salvatore Scaglione)	6:37
5.	"No Parachute"	3:43
6.	"The Game"	5:11
7.	"Superstar"	3:46
8.	"Race with Time" (Fox, Frothingham)	4:28
9.	"Hydra"	6:23
10.	"Counting Sheep"	11:20
Total length:		56:53

Japanese edition bonus tracks
No.	Title	Length
1.	"Demon Queen of Spiders"	5:06
2.	"Don't Blow It"
3.	"Snake Eyes"

== Personnel ==
=== Bigelf ===
- Damon Fox – vocals, keyboards, string arrangements
- Ace Mark – guitar
- Duffy Snowhill – bass
- Steve Frothingham a.k.a. Froth – drums

=== Guest appearances ===
- Linda Perry – backing vocals (on tracks 7 & 8)
- Danny "Lord Weatherby" Martin – ring leader (on track 1)
- Eric Gorfain – string arrangements

The Counting Sheep Orchestra (on tracks 1, 3, 6 & 10)

- Christopher Anderson-Bazzoli – conductor
- Daphne Chen, Terrence Glenny, Marisa Kuney, Ami Levy, Calabria McChesney, Cameron Patrick, Radu Pieptea, Melissa Reiner, Isabelle Senger, Marcy Vaj & Alwyn Wright – violins
- Caroline Buckman, Alma Fernandez, Leah Katz & David Sage – violas
- Peggy Baldwin, Matt Cooker, Richard Dodd & John Krovoza – cellos

The Section Quartet (on tracks 5 & 7)

- Eric Gorfain & Daphne Chen – violins
- Leah Katz – viola
- Richard Dodd – cello

The Kung-Pao Horns (on tracks 1, 2 & 10)

- Stewart Cole – trumpet
- James King – tenor sax, flute, piccolo
- Dan Ostermann – trombone
- Tracy Wannomae – alto sax, clarinet, bass clarinet, flute

=== Production ===
- Produced by Damon Fox
- Engineered by Ian Lehrfeld
- Mixed by Ian Lehrfeld with Damon Fox
- Mastered by Stephen Marcussen
