= Best of Me (Daniel Powter song) =

Single by Daniel Powter

from the album Under the Radar
- Released: September 24, 2008
- Length: 3:59
- Label: Warner Bros.
- Songwriter(s): Daniel Powter; Kara DioGuardi
- Producer(s): Linda Perry

Daniel Powter singles chronology
"Next Plane Home" (2008)	"Best of Me" (2008)	"Whole World Around" (2008)

"Best of Me" is a song by Canadian recording artist Daniel Powter from his third studio album Under the Radar (2008). It was released as a CD single and digital download on 24 September 2008 as the second single from the album. The song charted in Switzerland for 3 weeks from 15 February to 1 March 2009. The song was written by Daniel Powter and Kara DioGuardi. It was produced by Linda Perry.

== Background ==
Inspired by the creation of "Best of Me", Daniel Powter said: This song is inspired by a state of maintaining the current state, insisting on the best of me, self-redemption. In Daniel's career, he is always trying to reach the expectations of others. It is very difficult, and people feel that people want to get too much from you. Daniel also mentioned in the interview that this song is the best interpretation of himself.

== Track listing ==
Digital download
No.	Title	Length
1.	"Best of Me"	3:59

== Credits and personnel ==
- Lead vocals – Daniel Powter
- Producers – Linda Perry
- Lyrics – Daniel Powter, Kara DioGuardi
- Label: Warner Bros.

== Music video ==
A music video was made to promote the single. The video was directed by Diane Martel and shows Powter playing with his piano in front of a cinema screen while the background behind him changes constantly. The main contents of the background pictures shown are: old photos, landscapes and some small items that reflect the details of life.

== Chart performance ==
Chart (2009)	Peak position
Switzerland (Schweizer Hitparade)	40

== Re-recordings ==
Powter would later record an alternative version of Best of Me with the lyric "Though it's not your favorite song" changed to "Even if it's not your favorite song" for his greatest hits album named after the song. The alternative version's lyrics would be then used with a slightly different tune and added backing arrangement for the 2012 version on Powter's fourth studio album, Turn on the Lights.

== Cover versions ==
William Chan, a Hong Kong singer, recorded a cover version in Cantonese for his album in 2009. (Chinese name of the song: "今天終於知道錯")
