= Falling Uphill =

2003 studio album by Lillix

Studio album by Lillix
- Released: May 27, 2003
- Length: 40:53
- Label: Maverick
- Producers: Philip Steir; The Matrix; Linda Perry; Glen Ballard; John Shanks

Lillix chronology
| Falling Uphill (2003) | Inside the Hollow (2006) |

Singles from Falling Uphill
- 1. "It's About Time" Released: March 24, 2003; 2. "Tomorrow" Released: October 6, 2003

Professional ratings
Review scores
| Source | Rating |
|---|---|
| AllMusic | 2.5/5 stars |
| Rolling Stone | 2/5 stars |

Falling Uphill is the debut studio album by Canadian all-female pop rock band Lillix. It was released by Maverick Records on May 27, 2003.

The album includes a cover version of The Romantics' song "What I Like About You". This song also notably appeared on the Freaky Friday soundtrack, as well as in The WB comedy series What I Like About You. The single releases are "It's About Time", "What I Like About You", and "Tomorrow". "It's About Time" peaked at #17 on the Japan Top 20 chart, number 5 on TRL, and number 33 on the Billboard US Mainstream Top 40 Airplay. In 2007, Nielsen certified the song as receiving 50,000 spins. "What I Like About You" failed to chart. "Tomorrow" reached number 48 on R&R magazine's Pop Airplay chart. The song "Fork in the Road" was also included on volume 2 of Barbie's Cali Girl CD.

== Track listing ==
Falling Uphill – Standard edition
| No. | Title | Writer(s) | Producer(s) | Length |
|---|---|---|---|---|
| 1. | "Tomorrow" | Louise Burns; Lacey-Lee Evin; Tasha-Ray Evin; Linda Perry | Perry | 3:44 |
| 2. | "Quicksand" | Burns | Philip Steir | 3:46 |
| 3. | "It's About Time" | Burns; L. Evin; T. Evin; Lauren Christy; Scott Spock; Graham Edwards | The Matrix | 3:41 |
| 4. | "Dirty Sunshine" | Burns; L. Evin; T. Evin; Christy; Spock; Edwards | The Matrix | 3:17 |
| 5. | "Sick" | L. Evin; T. Evin | Steir | 3:37 |
| 6. | "Invisible" | L. Evin | Steir | 3:44 |
| 7. | "24/7" | T. Evin | Glen Ballard | 3:58 |
| 8. | "Because" | T. Evin | Steir | 2:26 |
| 9. | "Promises" | T. Evin | Steir | 3:22 |
| 10. | "Fork in the Road" | L. Evin | John Shanks; Steir^{[a]} | 3:11 |
| 11. | "Lost and Confused" | Burns | Steir | 3:16 |
| 12. | "What I Like About You" | Jimmy Marinos; Mike Skill; Wally Palamarchuk | Steir | 2:47 |
| Total length: | | | | 40:53 |

Falling Uphill – Japanese edition (bonus track)
| No. | Title | Writer(s) | Producers | Length |
|---|---|---|---|---|
| 13. | "Blind" | T. Evin | Steir | 3:56 |
| Total length: | | | | 45:49 |

=== Notes ===
- ^a signifies an additional producer

== Personnel ==
Lillix

- Lacey-Lee Evin – vocals, keyboards
- Tasha-Ray Evin – vocals, guitar
- Louise Burns – vocals, bass
- Kim Urhahn – drums, backing vocals

Additional personnel

- Glen Ballard – guitar, keyboards, production
- John Fields – guitar, bass, production
- Linda Perry – guitar, bass, keyboards, production
- Corky James – guitar
- Chris Lyon – guitar
- Michael Thompson – guitar
- Phil Solem – guitar
- Patrick Warren – keyboards
- Eric Alexander – drums
- Matt Chamberlain – drums
- Ronnie Ciago – drums
- Dorian Crozier – drums
- Victor Indrizzo – drums
- Joey Marchiano – drums
- Dave Raven – drums
- Dawn Richardson – drums
- Michael Urbano – drums
- Rai Thistlethwayte – piano
- Josh Auer – bass
- Jimmy Johnson – bass
- Philip Steir – drum programming, production
- Brian Barnes – editing
- Jamie Harding – editing
- Steve Marcussen – mastering

== Charts ==
Chart performance
| Chart (2003–2004) | Peak position |
|---|---|
| Canadian Albums (Nielsen SoundScan) | 61 |
| Japanese Albums (Oricon) | 14 |
| US Billboard 200 | 188 |
| US Heatseekers Albums (Billboard) | 6 |
