= Rich Girls =

2003 American reality show on MTV

- Genre: Reality
- Starring: Ally Hilfiger; Jaime Gleicher
- Opening theme: "This Town" by Lillix
- No. of seasons: 1
- No. of episodes: 10

Original release
- Network: MTV
- Release: October 28 – December 30, 2003

Rich Girls is an MTV reality television series that aired for one season in 2003. The series followed the lives of the daughters of two very successful businessmen: Ally Hilfiger (daughter of Tommy Hilfiger) and her then-best friend Jaime Gleicher (daughter of Leo Gleicher) as they completed their final semester of high school, graduated and spent the ensuing summer together. They are shown shopping and gossiping in a series of luxurious locales such as: London, the Hamptons, Hilfiger's family estates in Nantucket and tropical British West Indies, as well as Los Angeles. However, their home base and the setting for much of the action was New York City.

Ally and Jaime were the show's eponymous "rich girls" because Hilfiger's father is Tommy Hilfiger, the multi-millionaire owner of the same named fashion label and Gleicher's late father, Leo, was the founder of Innovation Luggage, a company with a net worth of $10 million.

Notable cameos that occurred during the program included American Idol judge Randy Jackson who ran into the girls at a Los Angeles eatery, former President of the United States Bill Clinton who attended a special screening of the World War II film Proud (a project Hilfiger produced) held aboard the Intrepid Sea, Air & Space Museum, and Ally's famous dad, who invited his daughter to his workplace to critique his junior's line.

A total of ten episodes were produced during the season, and included one that featured the Northeast blackout of 2003, which had a direct impact on the series, as the production was taping in New York at the time of the event.

As the show filmed, Hilfiger and Gleicher began to argue with each other, and living on camera apparently had a negative effect on both girls. After the season ended, Ally continued using marijuana for her illness many months before being placed in rehab by her parents where she was eventually properly diagnosed with Lyme disease. Gleicher was seen attending Barnard College as a freshman in the series' final episode, however during the airing of the series she began treatment at Silver Hill Hospital for depression and an eating disorder.

The two friends' off-screen animosity (they each served as co-producers of the series) caused them to split and they went their separate ways.

The program's theme song was "This Town", an edited cover version of a track from The Go-Go's 1981 debut album Beauty and the Beat and performed by the all-female Canadian pop/rock group Lillix.

== Episodes ==
No.	Title	Original release date
1	"Senior Prom"	October 28, 2003
2	"Graduation Day"	November 4, 2003
3	"Independence Day In Nantucket"	November 11, 2003
4	"Tommy's New Junior Line"	November 18, 2003
5	"Poor Mudge"	November 25, 2003
6	"Trip to Seattle"	December 2, 2003
7	"Los Angeles"	December 9, 2003
8	"The Troubles with Greece"	December 16, 2003
9	"Blackout in New York"	December 23, 2003
10	"Season Finale"	December 30, 2003
