= It's About Time (Lillix song) =

2003 single by Lillix

Single by Lillix

from the album Falling Uphill
- Released: March 24, 2003
- Genre: Pop; rock
- Length: 3:42
- Label: Maverick
- Songwriters: Louise Burns; Lacey-Lee Brass; Tasha-Ray Evin; Lauren Christy; Graham Edwards; Scott Spock
- Producer: The Matrix

Lillix singles chronology
"It's About Time" (2003)	"What I Like About You" (2003)

Music video
- "It's About Time" on YouTube

"It's About Time" is a song by Canadian pop rock band Lillix. It was written by band members Louise Burns, Lacey-Lee Brass, and Tasha-Ray Evin along with the Matrix, who also produced the track. The song was serviced to American contemporary hit and hot adult contemporary radio stations on March 24, 2003. "It's About Time" became a moderate radio hit in the United States in mid-2003, peaking at number 33 on the Billboard Mainstream Top 40 in June and reaching number 32 on the Radio & Records CHR/Pop Top 50 in May. The music video features the band playing the song and having fun together.

== Critical reception ==
Billboard reviewer Chuck Taylor described the track's style as similar to the music of Canadian rock singer Avril Lavigne, whom the Matrix had also produced songs for. He called the song a "super-catchy pop melody wrapped in a slightly edgy grit-and-grimace rock package. Brian Boone of Popdose said of the song, "Okay, so maybe it's not great. But it’s good," and compared "It's About Time" to a hypothetical rejected track from Liz Phair's 2003 eponymous studio album, which the Matrix produced as well. He went on to say, "at least it was young people playing their own instruments, and not just dancing around to bad choreography."

== Music video ==
The song's music video takes place in four main locations. During the introduction and chorus, the band performs "It's About Time" with their instruments in a dimly lit room. For the first verse, bassist Louise Burns walks down the sidewalk with a kid holding a boombox, then the scene switches to the band playing basketball with a group of boys, ending with drummer Kim Urhahn walking out of a door. The second verse shows the band hanging out on a couch. Afterwards, guitarist Tasha-Ray Evin gets up and leaves. During the final verse, the band is in a restaurant, with Burns playing an arcade game and keyboardist Lacey-Lee Brass playing a song on the jukebox. The final chorus and outro displays Lillix singing the song together on the couch and in front of a graffiti-covered wall.

== Personnel ==
Personnel are adapted from the Falling Uphill album liner notes.

- Louise Burns – writing
- Lacey-Lee Evin – writing
- Tasha-Ray Evin – writing
- The Matrix – writing, production, arrangement, recording
- Corky James – guitars
- Victor Indrizzo – drums
- Krish Sharma – drum recording
- Tom Lord-Alge – mixing
- Steve Marcussen – mastering

== Charts ==
Chart (2003)	Peak position
US CHR/Pop Top 50 (Radio & Records)	32
US Pop Airplay (Billboard)	33

== Release history ==
Region	Date	Formats(s)	Label(s)	Ref.
United States	March 24, 2003	Contemporary hit radio; hot AC radio	Maverick; Reprise	
