= Bigelf =

American progressive rock/metal band

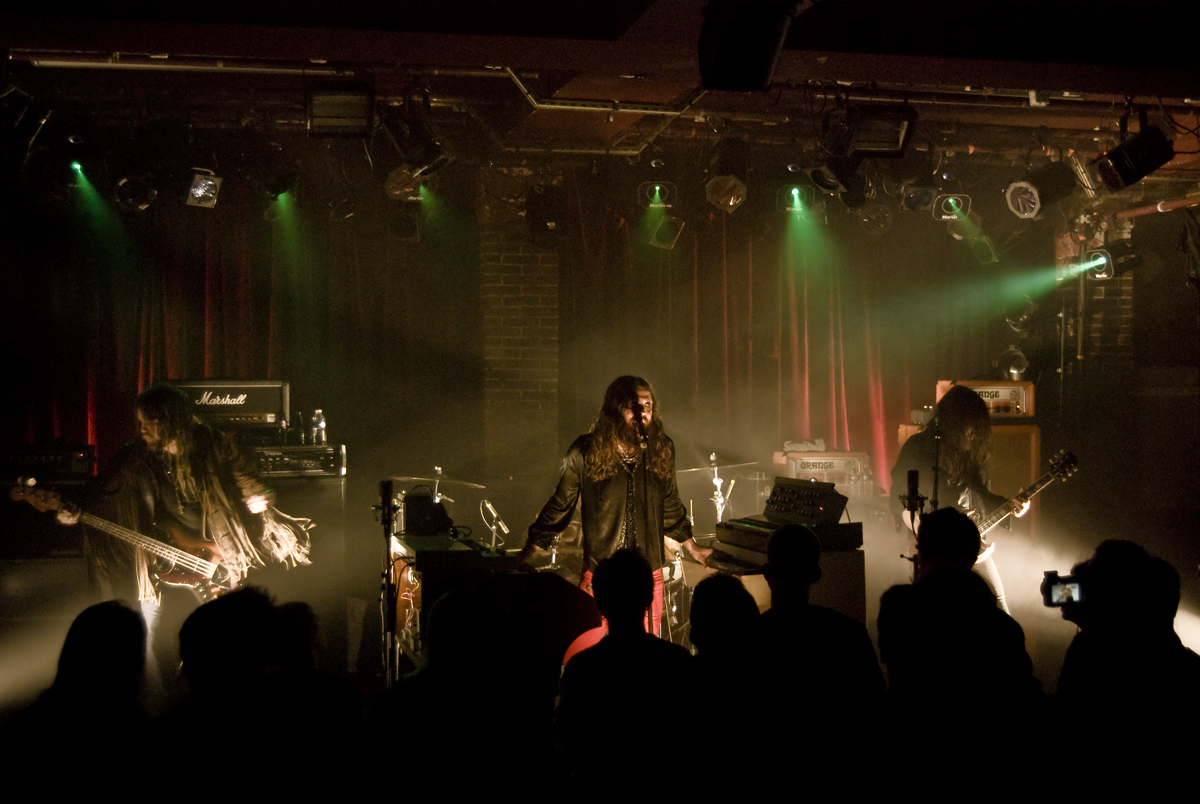
- Bigelf in 2010. From left to right: Duffy Snowhill, Damon Fox and Ace Mark. Steve Frothingham is just behind Fox.

Background information
- Origin: Los Angeles, California, U.S.
- Genres: Progressive rock, progressive metal, psychedelic rock, hard rock, heavy metal
- Years active: 1991–present
- Labels: Inside Out, Cuneiform
- Members: Damon Fox; Duffy Snowhill; Luis Maldonado; Baron Fox
- Past members: Richard Anton; Thom Sullivan; A.H.M. Butler-Jones; Steve "Froth" Frothingham; Ace Mark
- Website: www.bigelf.com

Bigelf is an American progressive rock/progressive metal band formed in Los Angeles in 1991. They have released four studio albums.

== Biography ==
Bigelf were formed as a psychedelic/glam-tinged hard rock outfit in 1991 in Los Angeles, California by Damon Fox and Richard Anton. They initially gained a large underground following. Bigelf's original line-up included Damon Fox (vocals/keyboards/guitar), Richard Anton (vocals/bass), A.H.M. Butler-Jones (vocals/guitar) and Thom Sullivan (drums).

The quartet recorded the six-track EP Closer to Doom in spring 1995, co-produced by Sylvia Massy. Closer to Doom was released in 1996 and established them as 'fathers' of the psychedelic doom movement that spawned the Los Angeles stoner rock scene. The first line-up change came when Steve Frothingham replaced Sullivan in late 1995; soon afterward founding member Richard Anton exited the band.

Continuing as a three-piece, they recorded Money Machine in summer 1997, which Swedish label Record Heaven eventually released in 2000. This led the band to tour Scandinavia, where they became a quartet again with the addition of Finnish bass player Duffy Snowhill, who debuted on their six-track EP Goatbridge Palace. Recorded in Stockholm in December 2000, it featured the singles "(Another)Nervous Breakdown" and "Side Effects" plus four live tracks, one being a cover of the Black Sabbath classic "Sweet Leaf". Serjical Strike Records released a limited pressing of Money Machine in the United States after System of a Down frontman Serj Tankian took an interest in the band. In summer 2001, Butler-Jones fell into a diabetic coma while on tour in Sweden (he would remain unconscious until his death on December 31, 2009, at the age of 42). Ace Mark (also from Helsinki, Finland) took his place on guitar, leaving Fox as the sole singer and songwriter.

Regaining focus with a new, solid foundation, Bigelf signed with Warner Music Sweden in 2002 and released Hex the following year. The band attained cult status overseas, most notably in Northern Europe.

In 2007, Bigelf covered John Lennon's song "Mother" with American pop singer Christina Aguilera for the compilation album Instant Karma: The Amnesty International Campaign to Save Darfur to benefit Amnesty International's campaign to alleviate the crisis in Darfur. The song received positive reviews.

August 2008 saw Bigelf release Cheat The Gallows, the band's debut release for Linda Perry's Custard Records. It includes the lead single "Money, It's Pure Evil".

In 2009, Bigelf toured with Dream Theater on their Progressive Nation 2009 tour. They were originally billed alongside Opeth and Unexpect on the European leg of the tour from September to November, but after Pain of Salvation and Beardfish were forced to drop out because of the bankruptcy of SPV, their record label's (InsideOut) distributor, Bigelf were also added to the North American tour as an opening act alongside Zappa Plays Zappa between July and August. The band once again supported Dream Theater as their opening act for the Mexican, Canadian, and South American tour in March 2010. In April 2010, Bigelf supported Porcupine Tree on their US Tour.

After being dropped from Custard Records the band went on indefinite hiatus after playing several festival shows in Japan in August 2010.

In September 2012, Fox announced via the band's Facebook and website that a new Bigelf album was in the making.

On April 3, 2013, Inside Out Music announced Bigelf had signed with the label and would release a new album later that year. Fox recruited former Dream Theater drummer Mike Portnoy to play on the new record, Into the Maelstrom, according both to the Inside Out announcement and to Portnoy's own Twitter feed. Guitarist Luis Maldonado was also invited to "take some solos and add some color" to the album and also to perform with the band on the Progressive Nation at Sea cruise ship festival on February 18–22, 2014 as well as festivals that summer.

In October 2014, guitarist John Wesley of Porcupine Tree and Mike Portnoy joined Bigelf as guest performers during their winter 2014 "Into the Maelstrom" European tour.

== Members ==
Current members

- Damon Fox – lead vocals, keyboards, guitar, bass (1991–present)
- Duffy Snowhill – bass (2000–present)
- Luis Maldonado – guitar (2013–present)
- Baron Fox – drums (2014–present)

Former members

- Richard Anton – lead vocals, bass (1991–96)
- Thom Sullivan – drums (1991–95)
- A.H.M. Butler-Jones – lead vocals, guitar, piano (1992–2001; died 2009)
- Steve "Froth" Frothingham – drums (1995–2010)
- Ace Mark – guitar (2002–2010)
- Mike Portnoy – drums (2013–2014; session and selected live shows)
- John Wesley – guitar (2014; selected live shows)

== Discography ==
=== Albums ===
- Money Machine (May 2000 - Record Heaven, Sweden; Aug. 2010 Powerage Records)
- Hex (Oct. 2003 - Warner Music Sweden; Oct. 2007 - Custard Records; Aug. 2010 Powerage Records)
- Cheat the Gallows (Aug. 2008 - Custard Records; Sep. 2009 - Powerage Records)
- Into the Maelstrom (May 2014 - InsideOut Records)

=== EPs ===
- Closer to Doom (Jan. 1996 - Third Hole Records, US; Aug. 2001 - Record Heaven, with 4 bonus tracks; Aug. 2010 Powerage Records, with 8 bonus tracks)
- Goatbridge Palace (May 2001 - Record Heaven)
- The Madhatter (Jun. 2003 - Warner Music Sweden)
