= Tomorrow (Lillix song) =

2003 single by Lillix

Single by Lillix

from the album Falling Uphill and Confessions of a Teenage Drama Queen
- Released: October 6, 2003
- Length: 3:42 (album version); 3:39 (radio remix)
- Label: Maverick
- Songwriter(s): Tasha-Ray Evin; Louise Burns; Lacey-Lee Evin; Linda Perry
- Producer(s): Linda Perry

Lillix singles chronology
"What I Like About You" (2003)	"Tomorrow" (2003)	"Sweet Temptation (Hollow)" (2006)

"Tomorrow" is a song by Canadian pop rock band Lillix, released by Maverick Records in October 2003 as the final single from the band's first studio album, Falling Uphill (2003). The song was written by three members of the band and Linda Perry, who also produced the track. It reached number 48 on the US Radio & Records CHR/Pop Top 50 chart.

== Alternate versions ==
The ending of the song on the Confessions of a Teenage Drama Queen soundtrack was different from the one on the Falling Uphill album.

== Track listing ==
US promo CD

1. "Tomorrow" (Linda Perry top 40 remix) – 3:40

== Charts ==
Chart (2003)	Peak position
US CHR/Pop Top 50 (Radio & Records)	48
