= Next Plane Home =

Single by Daniel Powter

from the album Under the Radar
- Released: August 20, 2008 (Japan); September 5, 2008 (EP Version); October 7, 2008 (U.S)
- Recorded: 2008
- Genre: Indie pop
- Length: 3:10
- Label: Warner Bros.; Festival Records (Australia)
- Songwriter(s): Daniel Powter; Rick Nowels
- Producer(s): Linda Perry

Daniel Powter singles chronology
"Love You Lately" (2007)	"Next Plane Home" (2008)	"Best of Me" (2008)

"Next Plane Home" is the sixth single by the Canadian Grammy Award-nominated recording artist, singer-songwriter and pianist, Daniel Powter. It is the first single from his third studio album, Under the Radar. It is first released on August 20, 2008, in Japan.

== Formats and track listings ==
- CD Single
1. "Next Plane Home"
2. "Best Of Me" (Demo Version)
3. "Free Loop" (Live from Studio A)

== Music video ==
The music video for the song is directed by Markku Lahdesmaki on July 18, 2008. It is shot on a runway in a desert, Lancaster, California, which is located approximately 70 miles, 112.5 km, north, by road travel, of the city of Los Angeles in Southern California's Antelope Valley. The singer, Daniel Powter, is wearing a grey suit while playing the piano when some biplanes are flying around, waiting for his daughter to arrive.

== Charts ==
Chart (2008)	Peak position
Hungary (Rádiós Top 40)	36
Swedish Singles Chart	29
UK Singles Chart	70
