= I Believe in You (Dolly Parton album) =

Studio album by Dolly Parton
- Released: September 29, 2017
- Studio: Westpark Sound (Franklin)
- Genres: Children's; country
- Length: 31:23
- Labels: Dolly; RCA
- Producers: Richard Dennison; Tom McBryde; Tom Rutledge

Dolly Parton chronology
The Complete Trio Collection (2016)	I Believe in You (2017)	Dumplin' (2018)

Singles from I Believe in You
- 1. "I Believe in You" Released: September 15, 2017

I Believe in You is the forty-sixth solo studio album and first children's album by American country music singer-songwriter Dolly Parton. It was released digitally on September 29, 2017, and physically on October 13, 2017, by Dolly Records and RCA Records. All proceeds from the album's sales will go to benefit Parton's Imagination Library.

== Background ==
The album was originally announced on July 5, 2014, with the release of the title track, "I Believe in You", as a free download on Parton's official website. The release stated, "All families who receive the gift of Imagination Library books were also presented with a free download of Parton's song, "I Believe in You", that she wrote for the Imagination Playhouse at Dollywood. Eleven additional songs will soon be made available for purchase, with 100 percent of sales supporting the longevity of the Dollywood Foundation."

On October 18, 2016, Parton re-released her children's book Coat of Many Colors, based on her hit song of the same name. This new version of the book featured new cover art and illustrations, as well as a free download of the song "Makin' Fun Ain't Funny". This version of the song features different instrumentation than the version featured on the album.

On August 15, 2017, Parton formally announced the album's upcoming release at a press conference at her management's Nashville office in front of reporters and their children, saying "I love kids and I am so excited. It just seems like the right time [to release a children's album]. Since I'm getting so old, I'm getting back into my second childhood." She also revealed the album's cover and track listing, as well as singing three songs from the album and reading a story to the children.

The album was made available for pre-order on September 15, 2017, along with the release of the album's title track, "I Believe in You".

Following the album's release, Parton released animated lyric videos for all thirteen of the album's tracks via her Vevo channel on November 17, 2017.

== Critical reception ==
Professional ratings
Review scores
Source	Rating
AllMusic	3/5 stars
Drowned in Sound	6/10 stars
The Independent	1/5 stars
Renowned for Sound	3/5 stars
The Spill Magazine	4/5 stars

The album has received mixed to positive reviews from critics. James Christopher Monger of AllMusic felt that Parton's "effusive personality and seemingly ageless voice lend themselves well to the [children's] genre", that her "natural charisma and easy demeanor help keep things from becoming too cloying", and "with all proceeds from the album going to her bookworm charity, it's awfully hard to find fault with any of it." Elizabeth Andrews of The Spill Magazine judged Parton's first foray into children's music a successful one, and that the album "is a gift to share with parents, kids, the young at heart among us, and anyone needing a bit of a pick-me-up." Drowned in Sound, however, criticized the production of the album, saying it was "as counterfeit as much of Parton's idealised America has been throughout the years, and sounds like it was made on a Casio keyboard for the most part"; nevertheless, "there's plenty for children to like about this album and it's hard to turn up the nose at the moral message which is at the core of the songs."

== Commercial performance ==
The album debuted at number 11 on the Billboard Kid Albums chart, and peaked at number 3 in its third week. It also peaked at number 20 on the Billboard Top Country Albums chart in its third week, with 4,800 copies sold. It has sold 25,500 copies in the United States as of April 2018.

== Track listing ==
All tracks are written by Dolly Parton.

I Believe in You track listing
No.	Title	Length
1.	"I Believe in You"	2:00
2.	"Coat of Many Colors"	2:56
3.	"Together Forever"	2:26
4.	"I Am a Rainbow"	1:58
5.	"I'm Here"	2:27
6.	"A Friend Like You"	1:52
7.	"Imagination"	2:23
8.	"You Can Do It"	1:53
9.	"Responsibility"	1:54
10.	"You Gotta Be"	1:54
11.	"Makin' Fun Ain't Funny"	2:19
12.	"Chemo Hero"	2:09
13.	"Brave Little Soldier"	2:34
14.	"A Reading of Coat of Many Colors" (bonus track)	2:45
Total length:		31:23

== Personnel ==
Adapted from the album liner notes.

- Robert Behar – wardrobe
- Paul Brannon – guitars
- Dennis Carney – cheek kisses photo
- Sarah Chapman – original graphic design
- Paul T. Couch – executive producer
- Richard Dennison – keyboards, producer, background vocals
- Trey Fanjoy – cover photo
- Vickie Hampton – background vocals
- Tim Hayden – keyboards
- Tom Hoey – drums, percussion
- The Inner Child Chorus – children's choir
- Shelley Jennings – background vocals
- Melodie Kirkpatrick – background vocals
- Chris Latham – edit engineer
- Steve Mackey – bass
- John Mayfield – mastering
- Tom McBryde – producer
- Shane McConnell – background vocals
- Jennifer O'Brian – background vocals
- Danny O'Lannerghty – bass
- Dolly Parton – lead vocals, executive producer
- Tom Reeves – mixing, engineering, drums
- Cheryl Riddle – hair
- Tom Rutledge – producer, engineering, edit engineer, acoustic guitar, bass, MIDI guitars
- Nathan Smith – edit engineer
- Steve Summers – wardrobe
- Jacob Timmons – back cover photo, additional photography, original graphic design
- Kent Wells – electric guitars

== Charts ==
Chart (2017)	Peak position
Australian Albums (ARIA)	80
Australian Country Albums (ARIA)	2
Scottish Albums (Official Charts)	90
UK Album Sales (OCC)	96
US Billboard 200	173
US Top Country Albums (Billboard)	20
US Kid Albums (Billboard)	3

== Release history ==
Country	Date	Format	Label
Worldwide	September 29, 2017	Digital download	Dolly Records; RCA Nashville
Worldwide	October 13, 2017	CD	Dolly Records; RCA Nashville
