= In Flight (Linda Perry album) =

Studio album by Linda Perry
- Released: September 16, 1996
- Genre: Alternative rock, blues rock
- Length: 58:18
- Label: Interscope
- Producer: Bill Bottrell, Linda Perry

Linda Perry chronology
In Flight (1996)	After Hours (1999)

Professional ratings
Review scores
Source	Rating
AllMusic	4/5 stars
The A.V. Club	(unfavorable)
Chicago Tribune	3/4 stars
Robert Christgau	(dud)
Entertainment Weekly	D (1996); C+ (2005)
Los Angeles Times	3/4 stars
People	(favorable)
Q	3/5 stars

In Flight is the first solo album by singer and producer Linda Perry. The album was released in 1996 and was produced by Bill Bottrell. Perry re-released the album in 2005 on her own record label, Custard Records. It was released on CD and vinyl and re-released on streaming platforms. The release contains original videos for the singles "Freeway" and "Fill Me Up".

== Songs ==
In Flight was described by Perry as "an audio diary" inspired by Pink Floyd's The Dark Side of the Moon She said she would have made it during her time as a member of 4 Non Blondes, but she "didn't have enough influence in the band". Songs such as "In My Dreams" and "Too Deep" were written during her time in the band, but not recorded. The album was intended to create an "atmosphere for visualization in the mind."

"Knock Me Out" was featured on the soundtrack of the film The Crow: City of Angels. Its melody was used by Ukrainian singer Alyosha for her entry in the Eurovision Song Contest in 2010, leading to allegations that her song "To Be Free" was plagiarized.

== Critical reception ==
Vincent Jeffrey, from AllMusic, proclaimed the album as "Both subtle and bombastic, sweet and aggressive, and intellectually and sonically challenging." He also said "There are a couple overly personal moments within the In Flight playlist, like the opener 'In My Dreams,' but Perry leans on her expressive vocals to keep the dangerously sincere material interesting."

Larry Cook, also from AllMusic, wrote, "She does not show off with powerhouse vocals as much as her earlier album with 4 Non-Blondes, but rather displays a softer tone on many of these songs while maintaining the unique sound of her voice. In Flight is a bit moody and somewhat creepy, which isn't a bad thing at all."

== Track listing ==
All tracks are written by Linda Perry

In Flight track listing
No.	Title	Writer(s)	Length
1.	"In My Dreams"		5:26
2.	"Freeway"		5:54
3.	"Uninvited"		4:25
4.	"Success"	Bill Bottrell; Perry	5:25
5.	"Life in a Bottle"		4:21
6.	"Fill Me Up"		5:00
7.	"Knock Me Out"	Perry; Marty Willson-Piper; Grace Slick	6:50
8.	"Too Deep"		5:37
9.	"Taken"		3:38
10.	"Fruitloop Daydream"	Perry; Bottrell; Brian MacLeod; Kevin Gilbert; Dan Schwartz	3:25
11.	"Machine Man"	Perry; MacLeod; Gilbert; Schwartz	3:20
12.	"In Flight"		5:03

=== Music videos ===
1. "Fill Me Up" (Music Video) – 4:44
2. "Freeway" (Music Video) – 4:35

== Personnel ==
- Linda Perry – vocals, guitars, piano, bass
- Bill Bottrell – guitars, bass, drums
- Kevin Gilbert – keyboards, guitars
- Dan Schwartz – bass, steel guitar
- Brian MacLeod – drums, percussion
- Lisa Germano – violin (appears courtesy of 4AD Records)

=== Additional personnel ===
- Grace Slick – vocals on "Knock Me Out"

=== Production ===
- Bill Bottrell – producer
- Linda Perry – co-producer
- Blair Lamb and Mark Cross – engineers
- Recorded at Toad Hall
- Mastered by Joe Gastwirt
- Jill Rose – project coordination

== Charts ==
Chart performance for In Flight
Chart (1996)	Peak position
Australian Albums (ARIA)	65
Austrian Albums (Ö3 Austria)	39
New Zealand Albums (RMNZ)	40
Swiss Albums (Schweizer Hitparade)	50
