= Junk (band) =

British pop band

Junk is a British pop rock band. Their song "Life Is Good," first recorded in the U.S. when they were called Ritalin, has appeared in numerous films and TV shows, such as Agent Cody Banks, The Benchwarmers, A Modern Twain Story: The Prince and the Pauper, Skyrunners, Veronica Mars, 10 Things I Hate About You, You Wish!, Go Figure, Switch, Laguna Beach: The Real Orange County, America's Funniest Home Videos, and is the theme song for reality show The Two Coreys.

Other featured songs include "So Hard" in Employee of the Month, "Waiting" in Dance of the Dead, "Satellite" in Clone High, Kyle XY and Sol Goode and "Everywhere" in Max Keeble's Big Move.
