= Under the Radar (Daniel Powter album) =

Studio album by Daniel Powter
- Released: September 15, 2008; February 14, 2009 (Asia Tour Edition CD + DVD)
- Recorded: 2007–2008
- Genres: Indie pop; pop rock
- Length: 40:37; 62:01 (Asia Tour Edition)
- Labels: Warner Bros.; FMR
- Producer: Linda Perry

Daniel Powter chronology
Daniel Powter (2005)	Under the Radar (2008)	Turn On the Lights (2012)

Singles from Under the Radar
- 1. "Next Plane Home" Released: August 2008; 2. "Best of Me" Released: September 2008; 3. "Whole World Around" Released: Spring 2009

Professional ratings
Aggregate scores
Source	Rating
Metacritic	40/100
Review scores
Source	Rating
Dotmusic	5/10 stars
Hot Press	2/10 stars
BBC Music	(mixed)

Under the Radar is the third studio album by Canadian singer-songwriter Daniel Powter and follows his 2005 self-titled second album. The album was released in September 2008 in Europe and was later released in North America in 2009. The song "Next Plane Home" was released as the first single of the album. It was followed by "Best of Me" and then "Whole World Around". This album also contains a new remix of "Love You Lately" which has a cleaner sound, extra keyboard/synthesizer effects, and some extra backing vocals as well as a re-recording of the song "Negative Fashion" which originally appeared on Powter's debut album "I'm Your Betty". In the UK, the album has debuted at number 43 and included an exclusive bonus track in the form of a live rendition of "Bad Day" in Vienna (This was also included on the Taiwan release).

Under the Radar was also given an exclusive CD and DVD release for the Asia Market known as the Asia Tour Edition. It was released on February 14, 2009.

The new remix of "Love You Lately" was re-released as a promo single in the US and received airplay in New England on AC charts. The remixed version was released on December 9, 2008.

== Track listing ==
All tracks are written by Daniel Powter, except where noted.

No.	Title	Length
1.	"Best of Me" (composed by Powter and Kara DioGuardi)	3:59
2.	"Not Coming Back"	4:01
3.	"Whole World Around"	4:27
4.	"Next Plane Home" (composed by Powter and Rick Nowels)	3:10
5.	"Am I Still the One?" (Duet with Linda Perry)	4:16
6.	"Negative Fashion"	3:26
7.	"Don't Give Up on Me"	3:31
8.	"Fly Away"	3:35
9.	"Beauty Queen" (composed by Powter and Linda Perry)	3:37
10.	"My So Called Life" (Linda Perry)	3:33
11.	"Love You Lately (Remix)"	3:02
12.	"Best of Me (Demo version)"	3:09
13.	"Free Loop (Live From Studio A) (Asia Tour Edition)"	4:32
14.	"Bad Day (Live in Vienna) (UK/Taiwan Bonus Track)"	4:17

Under The Radar Asia Tour Edition DVD track listing
No.	Title	Length
1.	"Best of Me (music video)"	3:44
2.	"Next Plane Home (music video)"	3:20
3.	"Love You Lately (music video)"	3:11
4.	"Whole World Around (Live From Taipei)"	3:20

== Charts ==
Chart performance for Under the Radar
Chart (2008)	Peak position
Austrian Albums (Ö3 Austria)	74
Belgian Albums (Ultratop Wallonia)	21
French Albums (SNEP)	29
Japanese Albums (Oricon)	10
Scottish Albums (Official Charts)	39
Swiss Albums (Schweizer Hitparade)	20
UK Albums (Official Charts)	43
