= Linda Perry =

American singer and songwriter (born 1965)

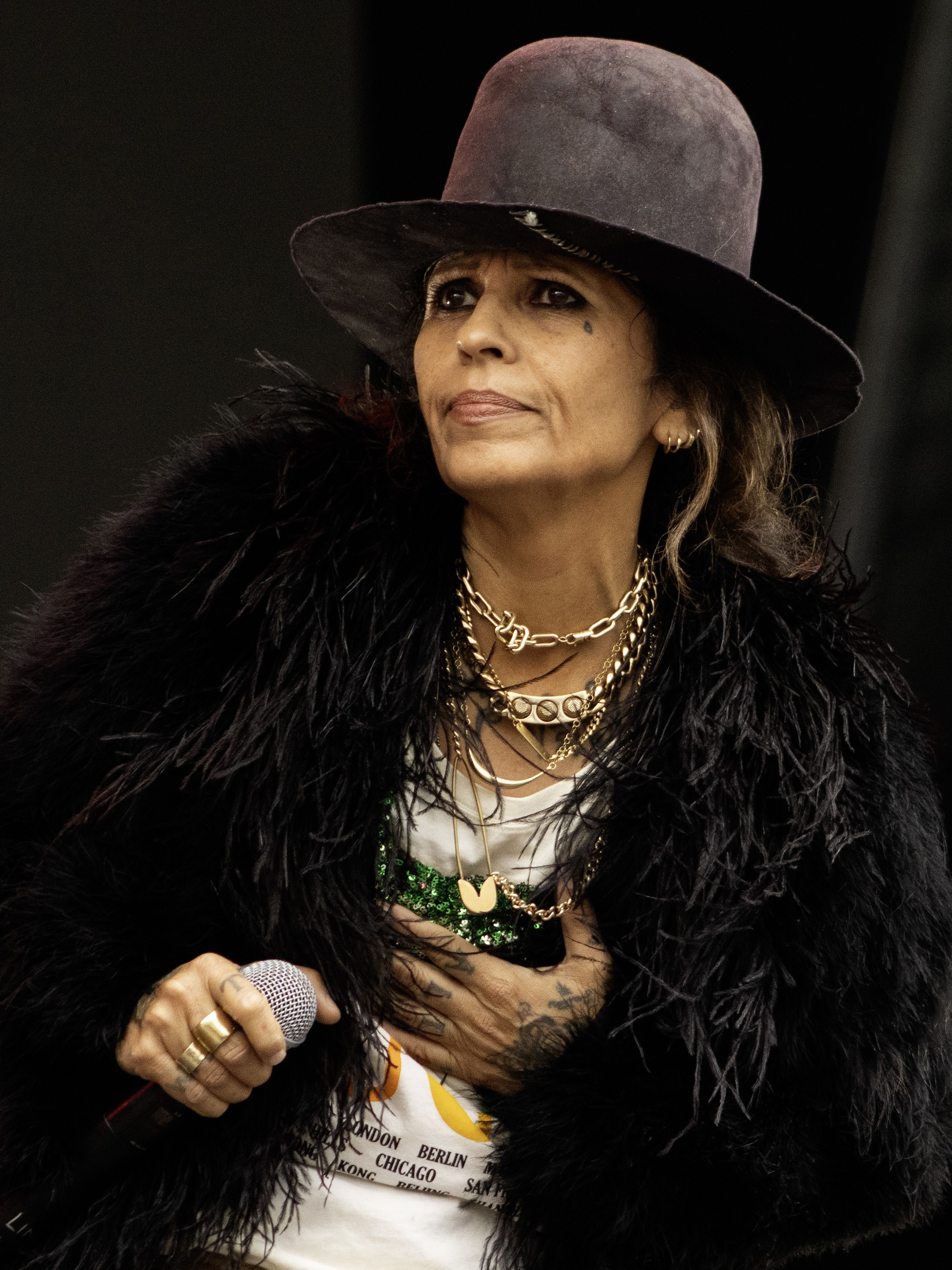
- Perry in 2024
- Born: April 15, 1965 (age 61); Springfield, Massachusetts, U.S.
- Occupations: Singer; songwriter; musician; record producer
- Years active: 1989–present
- Spouse: Sara Gilbert (m. 2014; div. 2019)
- Children: 1
- Musical career
- Genres: Alternative rock; pop rock
- Instruments: Vocals; guitar
- Labels: Interscope; Atlantic; Kill Rock Stars; Custard
- Member of: 4 Non Blondes

Linda Perry (born April 15, 1965) is an American singer, songwriter, musician, and record producer. She was the lead singer, primary songwriter, and guitarist of 4 Non Blondes, including their 1993 hit "What's Up?". She has since founded two record labels and composed and produced songs for other artists, which include: "Beautiful" by Christina Aguilera; "What You Waiting For?" by Gwen Stefani; and "Get the Party Started" by Pink. Perry also contributed to albums by Adele, Alicia Keys, and Courtney Love, as well as signing and distributing James Blunt in the United States. Perry was inducted into the Songwriters Hall of Fame in 2015.

== Early life ==
Perry was born in Springfield, Massachusetts on April 15, 1965. Her father was Alfred Xavier Perry, a musician and engineer of Portuguese descent. Her mother is Marluce Martins Perry, a model and designer of Brazilian descent. Growing up in an artistic and musical household, Perry displayed an interest in music from an early age.

She spent her teenage years in San Diego before moving to San Francisco in 1986 at the age of 21.

== Career ==
=== 1987–89: early career ===
In San Francisco, Perry lived in a small, windowless room, and played her guitar and sang her own songs on city streets. Third Eye Blind frontman Stephan Jenkins, who at the time was also a musician living in San Francisco, later recalled sitting in a room with Perry, performing their original compositions to one another. Perry, however, denied that this ever happened.

Perry performed solo at Bay Area clubs and coffeehouses, including Nightbreak, Paradise Lounge, DNA Lounge, and The Kennel Club.

=== 1989–95: 4 Non Blondes ===
Perry composed her first professional song, entitled "Down on Your Face," and was recruited into the band 4 Non Blondes by its founder Christa Hillhouse in the middle of 1989. The band established itself in the San Francisco bar scene, especially lesbian bars, gaining a significant lesbian following. In July 1991, the band was signed to Interscope Records.

In 1992, 4 Non Blondes recorded what would be the band's only album, Bigger, Better, Faster, More!, including the song "What's Up?", written by Perry. Unhappy with a re-worked version of the song insisted upon by the album's producer, Perry and the band re-recorded the song like Perry's original demo, with Perry's re-recorded version being used as the final version for the album. In March 1993, "What's Up" was released as the album's second single, reaching number one in 10 countries and driving the success of the album, which spent 59 weeks on the Billboard 200 and sold 1.5 million copies between 1992 and 1994.

During the recording of their second album in late 1994, 4 Non Blondes disbanded. Perry cited dissatisfaction with the first album and ongoing creative disagreements between herself and the band. She has also explained that her sexuality had a part to play in her tensions with the group.

=== 1996–1999: solo beginnings ===
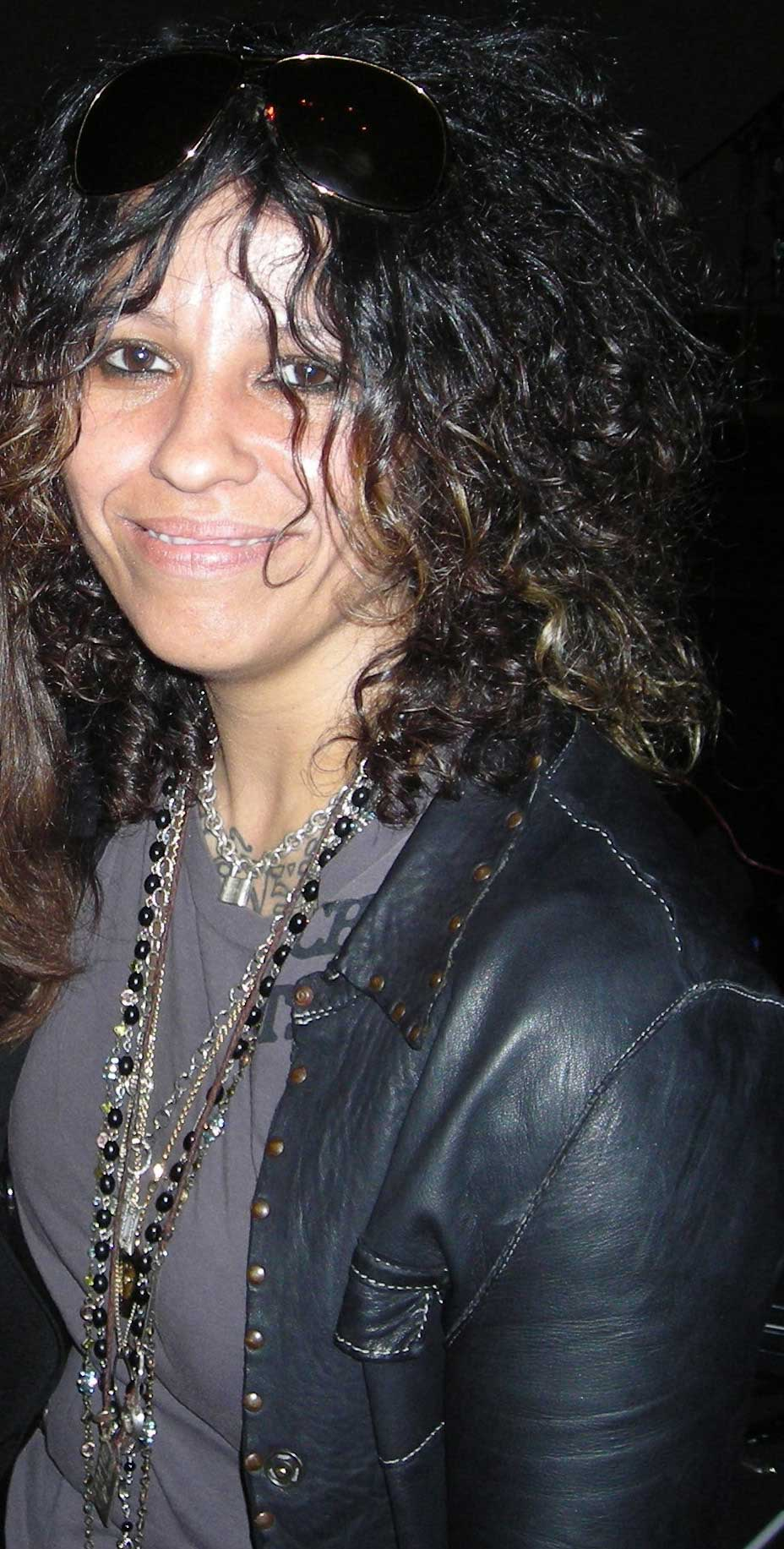
Linda Perry in May 2008

Interscope retained Perry as a solo artist and assembled a production team for her debut album, including Kevin Gilbert, Bill Bottrell, and members of the Tuesday Night Music Club, who had recently produced Sheryl Crow's debut. Released in 1996, In Flight received positive reviews, but was a poor seller. Perry joined Red Fish, Blue Fish for her world tour, supporting such acts as The Who. She promoted her CD with an appearance on The Howard Stern Show, during which she participated in "lesbian dial-a-date" and performed her former band's only hit single, "What's Up?" Perry also hosted the 1997 and 1998 Bay Area Music Awards, or "Bammies".

In 1999, she released her second solo album, After Hours, on Rockstar Records, and performed as an opening act for Bryan Adams.

=== 2000–2013: production and songwriting ===
Perry had begun acquiring recording equipment, including a TASCAM DA-88 recorder, Neumann U 67 microphone, and Fairchild 670 compressor. Curious about the new musical technology behind music she was hearing on the radio, she asked a friend. Based on their input, Perry purchased an Akai MPC sampler, and Roland and Korg Triton synthesizers, and taught herself to use them, writing her first dance song, "Get the Party Started", in the process. She sent the song to Madonna's manager Guy Oseary, who turned it down.

In 2000, Perry was contacted by pop rock singer Pink, seeking production and songwriting assistance on her second album, Missundaztood. Perry co-wrote and produced much of the album, including full writing credits for the songs "Lonely Girl" and "Get the Party Started", which was released as the album's lead single and became Pink's biggest hit to date. The album's worldwide commercial and critical success brought Perry back into the spotlight as a music producer and songwriter. The following year, Perry produced for Christina Aguilera another song she had written, "Beautiful", another worldwide commercial success.

In 2003, Perry won two American Society of Composers, Authors and Publishers awards for her songwriting, and a Grammy Awards nomination for her song "Beautiful" as a contender for "Song of the Year"; the song received the award for Best Female Pop Vocal Performance at the 46th Annual Grammy Awards.

She collaborated with art-dance duo Fischerspooner on a few songs for their sophomore album and ended the year with a few co-writing credits on Gwen Stefani's solo debut, Love. Angel. Music. Baby., including the album's first single, "What You Waiting For?" Additionally, her Atlantic-distributed label, Custard Records, was launched to promote two new acts, Sunshine and James Blunt. She produced and played guitar on the recording of Blunt's song "No Bravery". The year ended with Perry co-writing "Save Me" for the southern California punk rock band Unwritten Law.

In 2005, Perry re-released her solo album In Flight. The same year, she began working with Christina Aguilera on her third studio album, Back to Basics (2006), co-writing with Aguilera every song on the album's second disc. In late 2006 and early 2007, Perry contributed production and songwriting to Vanessa Carlton's third studio album, Heroes and Thieves.

Perry won an award from the San Francisco chapter of the Recording Academy for her contribution to the world of music.

Perry signed the group Little Fish to her label in 2008 and began producing its album, Baffled and Beat, which was released in August 2010. Also in that same year, she collaborated with Daniel Powter to produce his third studio album Under the Radar.

She wrote and produced "A Loaded Smile" for Adam Lambert's debut studio album For Your Entertainment (2009). Aguilera's sixth studio album, Bionic, released in 2010, included "Lift Me Up", written and produced solely by Perry.

On November 5, 2010, Perry appeared live in San Francisco with 4 Non Blondes guitar player Roger Rocha at TwentyFifty (formerly CELLSpace). The appearance celebrated the release of Rocha's album with his band The Golden Hearts. Perry performed a solo set of cover tunes, including Radiohead's "Creep" and Soundgarden's "Black Hole Sun". Perry and Roger Rocha performed one song together, Led Zeppelin's "Since I've Been Loving You".

In June 2010, Perry announced on her Facebook and Twitter profiles that she was "going to make an album" with her new band Deep Dark Robot, which she founded with Tony Tornay. The album, 8 Songs About a Girl, was promoted with the single "Won't You Be My Girl?" Perry imagined the name Deep Dark Robot as part of an ad-libbed song lyric—"deep dark robot falling in love"—and decided to hang onto the name for her next musical project. The band released the album in March 2011 and began touring.

In July 2011, Perry started to publish a set of acoustic cover songs that she recorded with her iPhone, including "Mad World" by Tears for Fears, "Just What I Needed" by the Cars, and "Creep" by Radiohead, among many others. On her Facebook account, she wrote: "iPhone sessions are me sitting at my piano an recording song into iPhone voice memo. Then I post it. Very simple enjoy :)"

=== 2014–present: recent career ===
In 2014, Perry appeared in the VH1 reality television show Make or Break: The Linda Perry Project, in which she worked with up-and-coming musicians, like VanJess and winner Hemming.

Perry was scheduled to appear as the house band in a special series of late night editions of The Talk airing the week of January 12, 2015 in the 12:34 am time slot of The Late Late Show.

Perry co-wrote a song with Adele for her 2015 album 25 titled "Can't Let Go" which was included as a bonus track on the Target and Japanese editions. Perry played piano, produced and engineered the track. She also wrote the theme song for the film Freeheld titled "Hands of Love," performed by Miley Cyrus.

In June 2015, Perry was inducted into the Songwriters Hall of Fame at a ceremony in New York.

In 2018, Perry collaborated with Dolly Parton, writing the Golden Globe-nominated "Girl In The Movies" for the Netflix film Dumplin'.

In 2020, Perry co-wrote "A Beautiful Noise" with seven other female writers - Alicia Keys, Brandi Carlile, Brandy Clark, Hillary Lindsey, Lori McKenna, Hailey Whitters and Ruby Amanfu - and the song was performed by Alicia Keys and Brandi Carlile with the purpose of inspiring American voters to vote in the 2020 Presidential Election.

In 2026, Perry was a guest host on Howard 101 on the "Songs I Want To Hear" series.

==== We Are Hear ====
In 2017, Perry partnered with Kerry Brown to launch We Are Hear, a record label, music publisher, and artist management company based in Los Angeles. Under their leadership, the company has signed recording artists Natasha Bedingfield, Imogen Heap, Dorothy, and Willa Amai among others, and collaborated with artist Kii Arens. Perry has also co-curated events with We Are Hear such as One Love Malibu festival in 2018, which raised $1 million in relief funds for damage caused by the Woolsey Fire, and The Art of Elysium fundraiser Heaven Is Rock & Roll in 2020, featuring the surviving members of Nirvana (Dave Grohl, Pat Smear, and Krist Novoselic) performing alongside Beck and St. Vincent, in addition to performances from Cheap Trick, L7, and Marilyn Manson.

== Personal life ==
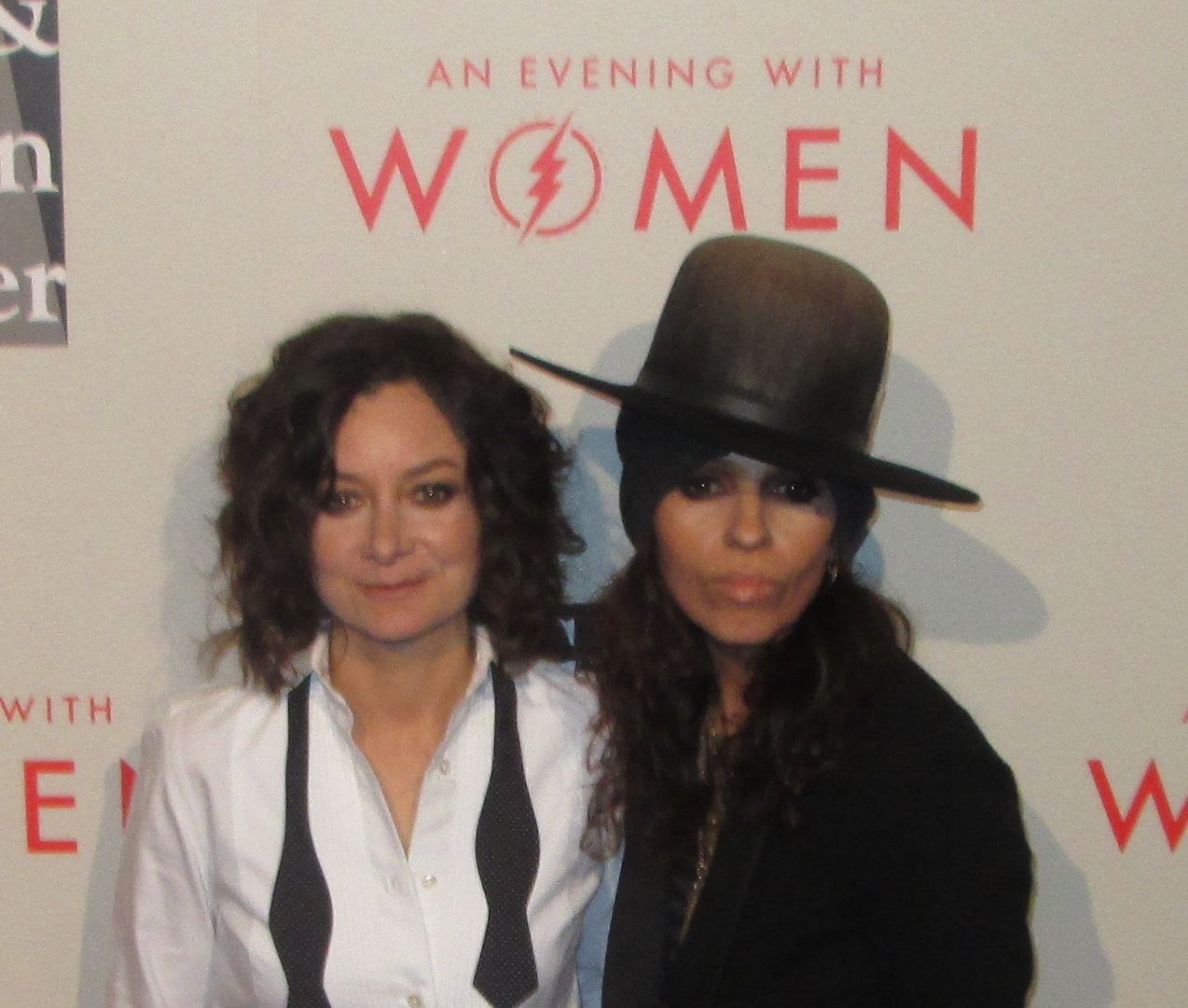
Perry with her then wife Sara Gilbert at the Los Angeles LGBT Center's An Evening with Women event in 2014

Perry moved from San Diego to San Francisco and lived there until 1997, moving to Sherman Oaks, Los Angeles.

Perry is a lesbian. In 1995, she told a journalist from The Advocate, "All my life I've loved women, and that's it. I've never been any other way." Earlier at the 1994 Billboard Music Awards she displayed the slang word "dyke" on her guitar for a performance with 4 Non Blondes.

Perry was in a relationship with actress Clementine Ford from 2009 to 2010.

Perry began a relationship with actress Sara Gilbert in 2011. They announced their engagement in April 2013 and married on March 30, 2014. Gilbert gave birth to their son on February 28, 2015. Perry was the stepmother of Gilbert's son and daughter from a previous relationship with television producer Ali Adler. In December 2019, Gilbert filed for legal separation from Perry.

== Discography ==
=== Solo works ===
==== Albums ====
List of albums, with selected details and chart positions
Title	Details	Peak chart positions			
Title	Details	AUS	AUT	NZ	SWI
In Flight	Released: September 16, 1996; Label: Interscope	65	39	40	50
After Hours	Released: 1999; Label: Rockstar Records	—	—	—	—
Deer Sounds (as Linda Perry + Sara Gilbert's Deer Sounds)	Released: 2015; Label: Custard	—	—	—	—
Let It Die Here	Released: May 8, 2026; Label: Kill Rock Stars/670 Records	—	—	—	—

==== Singles ====
List of singles, with selected chart positions
Title	Year	Peak chart positions		Album
Title	Year	AUS	NZ	Album
"Fill Me Up"	1996	63	30	In Flight
"Freeway"	1996	—	—	In Flight
"Beautiful"	2026	—	—	Let It Die Here
"Let It Die Here"	2026	—	—	Let It Die Here
"Balboa Park"	2026	—	—	Let It Die Here

=== Production and songwriting ===
Singles produced or written by Linda Perry

Year	Song	Artist	Peak chart positions				
Year	Song	Artist	US	UK	GER	ITA	AUS
2001	"Get the Party Started"	Pink	4	2	2	4	1
2002	"Beautiful"	Christina Aguilera	2	1	4	8	1
2003	"Tomorrow"	Lillix	—	—	—	—	—
2004	"What You Waiting For?"	Gwen Stefani	47	4	22	2	1
2004	"Mono"	Courtney Love	—	41	—	—	—
2005	"One Word"	Kelly Osbourne	121	9	60	—	38
2005	"Idiot"	Lisa Marie Presley	—	—	—	—	—
2005	"Save Me (Wake Up Call)"	Unwritten Law	108	—	—	—	—
2005	"Redlight"	Kelly Osbourne	—	73	—	—	—
2006	"Wonderful Life"	Gwen Stefani	—	—	—	—	—
2006	"Perfect Stranger"	Cheap Trick	—	—	—	—	—
2006	"Hurt"	Christina Aguilera	19	11	2	11	9
2006	"Nothing But"	Skin	—	—	—	—	—
2007	"Candyman"	Christina Aguilera	25	17	11	8	2
2007	"Where Do We Go"	Ben Jelen	—	—	—	—	—
2008	"Superwoman"	Alicia Keys	82	128	43	—	57
2008	"Next Plane Home"	Daniel Powter	—	70	—	—	—
2008	"Keeps Gettin' Better"	Christina Aguilera	7	14	14	12	26
2008	"My Love"	Celine Dion	—	—	—	—	—
2008	"Best of Me"	Daniel Powter	—	—	—	—	—
2009	"La Scala (The Ladder)"	Giusy Ferreri	—	—	—	27	—
2011	"Put Your Hearts Up"	Ariana Grande	—	—	—	—	—
2015	"Hands of Love"	Miley Cyrus	—	—	—	—	—
2020	"A Beautiful Noise"	Alicia Keys & Brandi Carlile					
2023	"Let's Take A Shot"	Pitbull & Vikina	—	—	—	—	—

=== Other appearances ===
- Susanna Hoffs by Susanna Hoffs (1996): "Weak With Love", guitar and backing vocals by Linda Perry
- Missundaztood by Pink (2001): "Lonely Girl" featuring Linda Perry
- Hitting the Ground by Gordon Gano (2002), Instinct Records (August 19, 2002): "So It Goes", music and lyrics by Gordon Gano, vocals by Linda Perry also featuring Frank Ferrer
- Prey for Rock & Roll (OST) by Various Artists (2003): "Stupid Star", performed by Gina Gershon, Linda Perry and Patty Schemel
- Odyssey by Fischerspooner (2005): "Happy", additional vocals by Linda Perry
- Back to Basics by Christina Aguilera (2006): "Enter the Circus", performed by Linda Perry (uncredited)
- Plain Girl, Wild Love by Planet Swan (2007): "Chompin' on a Bit", performed by Planet Swan featuring Linda Perry and Sierra Swan
- Fuzzbox by The Section Quartet (2007): "Paranoid Android", operatic vocals by Linda Perry
- Cheat the Gallows by Bigelf (2008): "Superstar" and "Race With Time", backing vocals by Linda Perry
- Under the Radar by Daniel Powter (2008): "Am I Still the One?", performed with Daniel Powter, "Beauty Queen", performed with Daniel Powter, My So Called Life", performed with Daniel Powter

== Awards and nominations ==
=== Critics' Choice Movie Awards ===
Year	Award	Nominated work	Result	Ref.
2018	Best Song	"Girl in the Movies" (Note: Shared with Dolly Parton.)	Nominated	

=== Georgia Film Critics Association ===
Year	Award	Nominated work	Result	Ref.
2018	Best Original Song	"Girl in the Movies"	Nominated	

=== Golden Globe Awards ===
Year	Award	Nominated work	Result	Ref.
2018	Best Original Song	"Girl in the Movies"	Nominated	

=== Grammy Awards ===
Year	Award	Nominated work	Result	Ref.
2003	Song of the Year	"Beautiful"	Nominated	
2005	Album of the Year	Love. Angel. Music. Baby. (Note: As a Producer.)	Nominated	
2018	Producer of the Year, Non-Classical	—N/a	Nominated	
2019	Best Song Written for Visual Media	"Girl in the Movies"	Nominated	
2021	Song of the Year	"A Beautiful Noise" (Note: Shared with Ruby Amanfu, Brandi Carlile, Brandy Clark, Alicia Keys, Hillary Lindsey, Lori McKenna, and Hailey Whitters.)	Nominated	

=== Guild of Music Supervisors Awards ===
Year	Award	Nominated work	Result	Ref.
2018	Best Song/Recording Created for a Film	"Girl in the Movies" (Note: Shared with Dolly Parton and Buck Damon.)	Nominated	

=== Hollywood Music in Media Awards ===
Year	Award	Nominated work	Result	Ref.
2018	Best Original Song in a Feature Film	"Girl in the Movies"	Nominated	
2024	Best Original Score – TV/Streamed Movie	Out of My Mind	Nominated	
2024	Best Original Song in an Independent Film	"City of Dreams"	Nominated	

=== Songwriters Hall of Fame ===
Year	Award	Result	Ref.
2015	Songwriters Hall of Fame	Inducted	

=== Žebřík Music Awards ===
Year	Award	Nominated work	Result	Ref.
1993	Best International Female	Herself	Nominated	
1994	Best International Female	Herself	Nominated	
1996	Best International Female	Herself	Nominated	
