= Damon Fox (musician) =

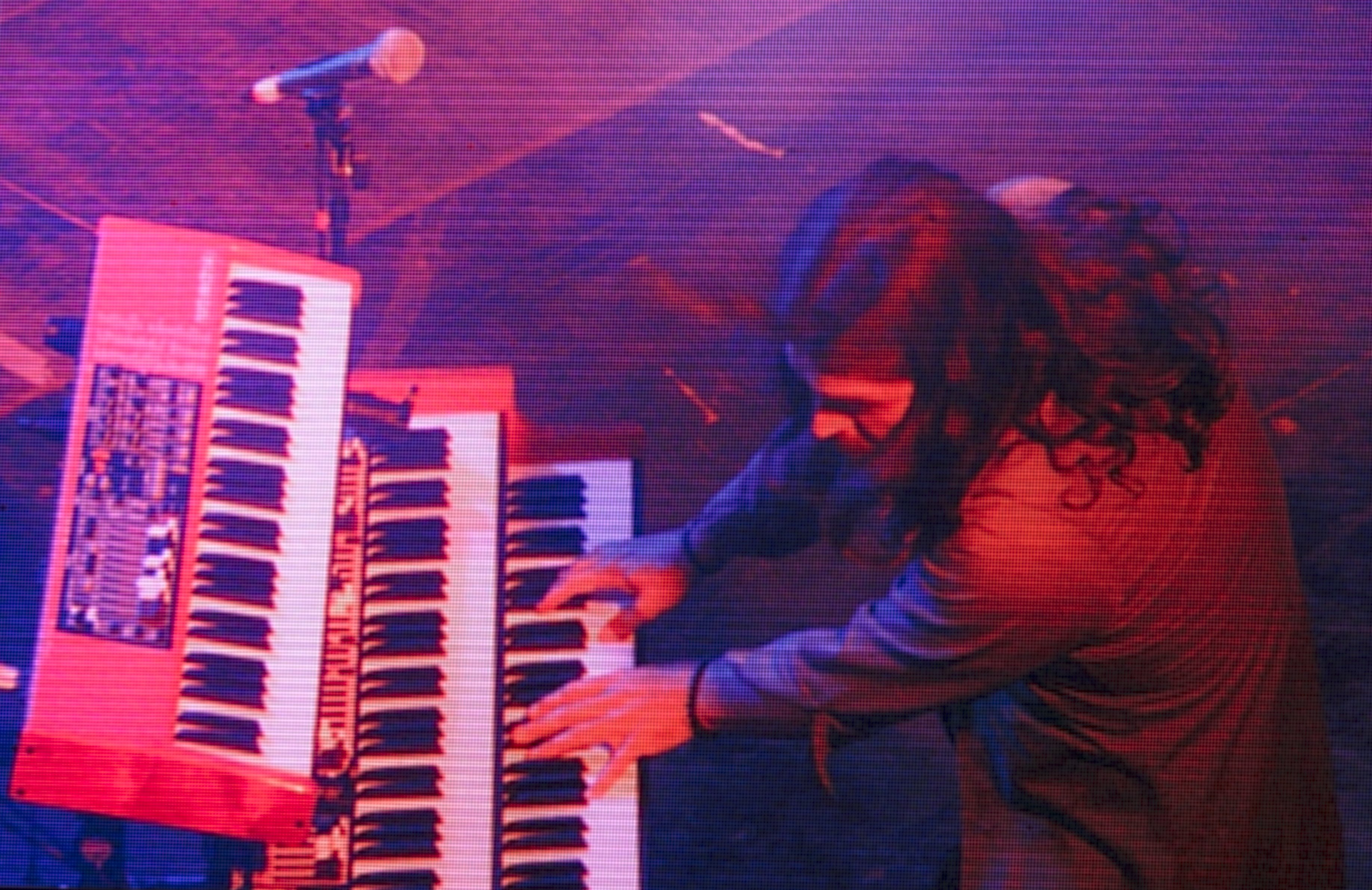
- Fox performing with The Cult in 2018

Background information
- Origin: Los Angeles, California, United States
- Genres: Progressive rock; psychedelic rock; stoner metal
- Occupations: Multi instrumentalist; songwriter; singer; producer
- Instruments: Vocals; keyboards; guitar
- Years active: 1991–present
- Website: www.bigelf.com

Damon Fox is an American musician, based in Los Angeles. He is primarily recognized as the lead singer and keyboardist of the psychedelic prog metal outfit Bigelf, as well as for his time with the British rock band The Cult from 2016 to 2022.

Fox can be heard on several platinum albums, including Alicia Keys’ As I Am and Christina Aguilera's Stripped and Back To Basics. He also appears on the keyboard on releases from Matt Sorum (Guns N' Roses), Cheap Trick, and Courtney Love. Fox made a guest appearance on season six of RuPaul's Drag Race, when drag fan favorite Darienne Lake did a makeover of him as a bride; the "brides" from the episode, all straight men, appeared on the behind the scenes show Untucked with their spouses dressed as grooms.

== Discography ==
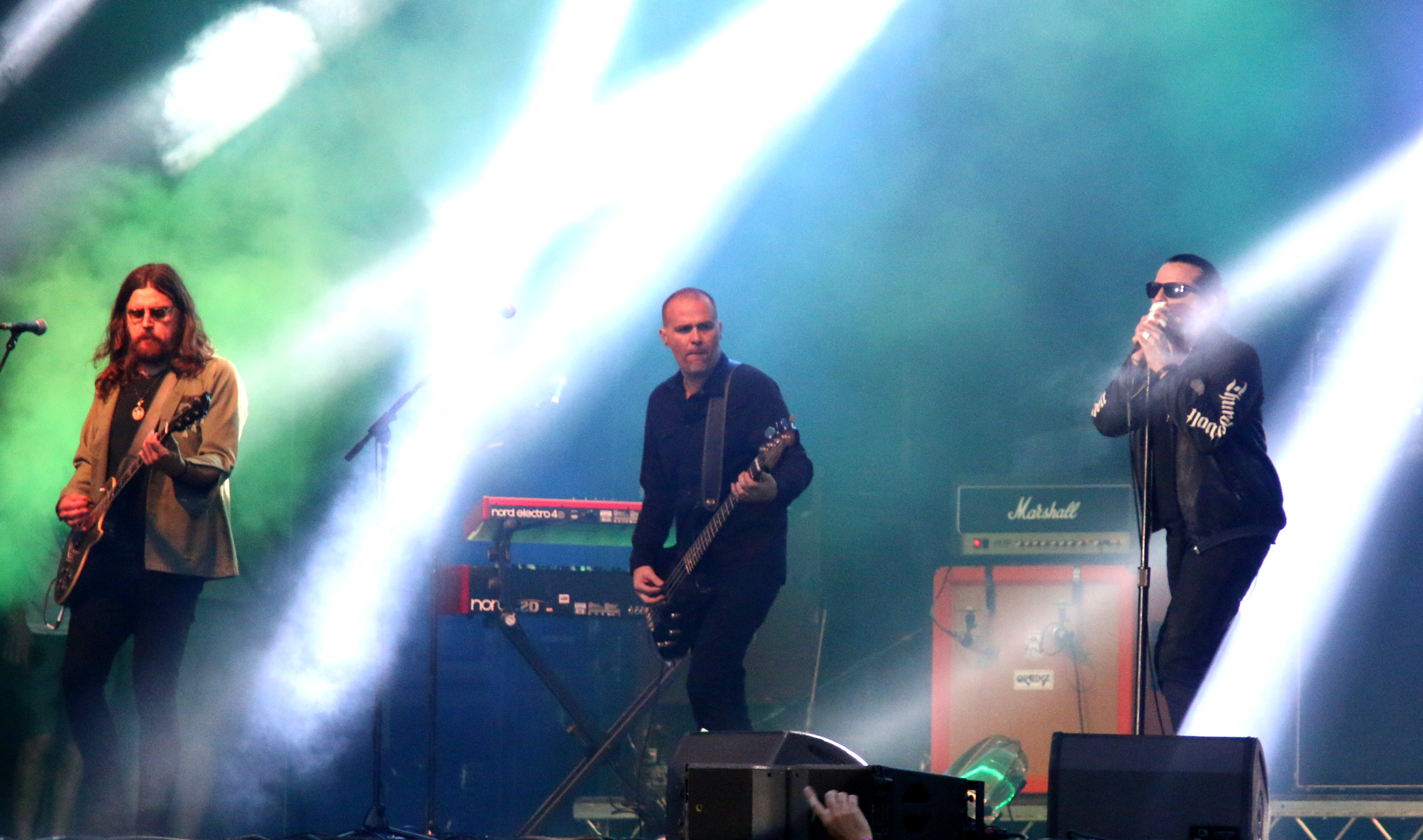
Fox with Grant Fitzpatrick and Ian Astbury, performing with The Cult

Year	Band or artist	Song or album	Credits
1995	Bigelf	Closer To Doom	Producer, writer, vocals, Hammond Organ, Mellotron/Chamberlin, Minimoog, Rhythm Guitar, Percussion
1997	Bigelf	Money Machine	Producer, writer, vocals, Hammond Organ, Mellotron, Moog Modular 3P, Bass Guitar
1997	Bigelf	Progfest (live CD)	Vocals, Hammond Organ, Chamberlin, Moog Modular 3P
2000	Bigelf	Goatbridge Palace (live CD)	Vocals, Hammond Organ, Mellotron, Minimoog
2000	Tyler Bates	Rated X (film)	Hammond Organ
2002	Christina Aguilera	Stripped	Piano, Minimoog
2002	Bigelf	The Madhatter EP	Producer, writer, vocals, Hammond Organ, Mellotron, Minimoog, Rhythm Guitar
2003	Bigelf	Hex	Producer, writer, vocals, Hammond Organ, Mellotron, Minimoog, Korg MS-20, Rhythm Guitar
2005	Tyler Bates	The Devil's Rejects	Mellotron, Farfisa Organ, Ring Modulator FX
2006	Cheap Trick	Rockford	Mellotron
2006	Christina Aguilera	Back To Basics	Hammond Organ
2007	Ben Jelen	Ex-Sensitive	Hammond organ, Mellotron, Minimoog, Piano, Lead & Rhythm guitar, Electric Sitar, Mixing
2007	Alicia Keys	As I Am	Hammond Organ, Mellotron, Minimoog
2008	Bigelf	Cheat The Gallows	Producer, writer, vocals, Hammond Organ, Mellotron, Piano, Fender Rhodes, Moog Modular 3P, Minimoog, Korg MS-20, Rhythm & acoustic Auitar, String Arrangements
2008	Celine Dion	My Love	Piano, Mellotron, Hammond Organ
2010	Hole	Nobody's Daughter	Piano
2014	Matt Sorum	Stratosphere	Mellotron, Minimoog, Wurlitzer 140B Electric Piano, Organ, Writer
2014	Angie & The Deserters	West Of The Night	Hammond Organ
2014	Various Artists	The Linda Perry Project	Hammond Organ
2014	Bigelf	Into the Maelstrom	Producer, engineer, writer, vocals, Hammond Organ, Mellotron, Piano, Fender Rhodes, Memorymoog, Minimoog, Korg MS-20, Synergy II+, Electric & acoustic Guitars, Bass Guitar
