= Lillix =

Former Canadian pop rock band

- Also known as: Tigerlily
- Origin: Cranbrook, British Columbia, Canada
- Genres: Rock; pop rock; pop punk
- Years active: 1997–2010
- Label: Maverick (2001–2006)
- Past members: Tasha-Ray Evin; Lacey-Lee Brass; Louise Burns; Sierra Hills; Kim Urhahn; Alicia Warrington; Scott Thompson; Britt Black; Eric Hoodicoff; Cameron Brass; Alex Varon

Lillix (/ˈlɪlɪks/) was a pop rock band from Cranbrook, British Columbia, Canada. An all-girl group for most of its existence, the band was formed in 1997 under the original name Tigerlily by guitarist and lead vocalist Tasha-Ray Evin, keyboardist and co-vocalist Lacey-Lee Evin, bassist and co-vocalist Louise Burns, and drummer Sierra Hills while the quartet were in high school. After being signed by Maverick Records in 2001, the group changed their name to Lillix as there was another band called Tigerlily. Hills left in 2002 and was replaced by Kim Urhahn, and later by Alicia Warrington, a future WWE NXT ring announcer under the name Alicia Taylor. Urhahn has been among a rare group of left-handed female drummers. The band was considered on hiatus from late 2006 through 2009 due to the folding of their label, Maverick Records, and officially disbanded after the release of their independent third album in 2010. Their debut album Falling Uphill was an international success, selling more than half a million copies worldwide.

== Career ==
=== 2001–2006: Falling Uphill and Inside the Hollow ===
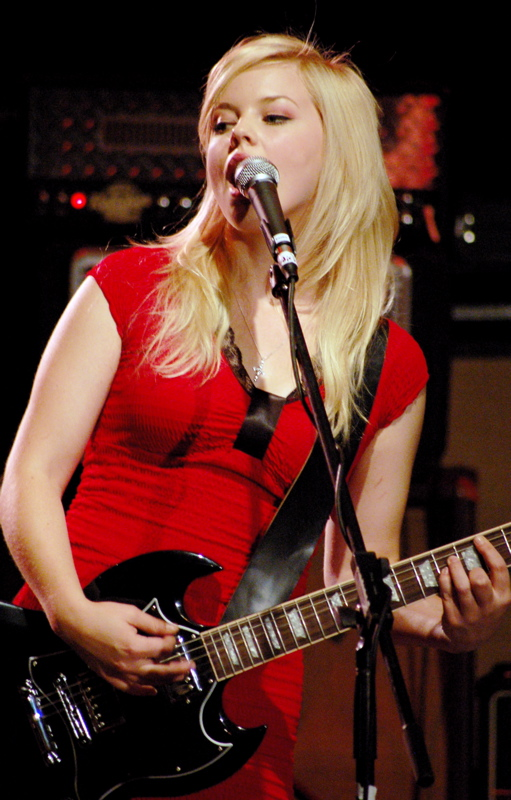
Tasha-Ray Evin in Shineapalooza Concert at the Medicine Hat College Theatre in 2006.

Under their original name of Tigerlily, the group sent their demo to an industry lawyer named Jonathan Simkin, who liked the band's sound and helped promote them to record labels. The group ultimately ended up signing with Maverick Records in 2001 and changed their name to Lillix. Their debut album Falling Uphill was released in Canada and the United States on 27 May 2003 and in Japan on 27 August. "It's About Time" was released as the band's first single in the spring of 2003 and reached 33 on the Billboard Mainstream Top 40 airplay chart. It was followed that fall by "Tomorrow", which did not enter the Billboard pop chart but did reach number 48 on the Radio & Records CHR/Pop Top 50 chart tracking airplay on contemporary hit radio stations. Falling Uphill also featured a cover of "What I Like About You" by The Romantics, which was featured on the 2003 Freaky Friday soundtrack, and serves as the theme song for the comedy series of the same name. The band received two nominations at the 2004 Junos. The album has sold more than half a million copies worldwide making it their best selling album.

The second album, Inside the Hollow, was released in Canada on 29 August 2006 and in Japan on 6 September. The only single from this album is "Sweet Temptation (Hollow)". This album's release featured drummer Alicia Warrington in October 2005.

=== 2007–2010: Hiatus, Tigerlily, and disbandment ===
Maverick Records was dissolved in 2007 following a restructuring that took place after it became a wholly owned subsidiary of the Warner Music Group the previous year. Consequently, Lillix was not retained by Warner Bros. Records, leaving the band without a recording contract. In April 2008, Lillix moved to Vancouver and prepared to record a new album. On 15 March 2009, the band introduced a new member, Britt Black, and announced the recording of a new single, "Dance Alone". The song was released on June 14. It was followed in March, 2010 by "Nowhere to Run" and was later accompanied by a music video directed by Colin Minihan that premiered on August 7. The title of the new album, announced on July 17, was Tigerlily, in honor of their original band name.

Tigerlily was released in Canada on August 24 and later released in Japan along with two bonus tracks. The first single released was "Dance Alone", which did not chart but achieved moderate airplay. In November 2015, an interview with Lacey-Lee was published by SonicBids Blog discussing the band's label (Maverick) folding and the struggles they faced afterward.

== Discography ==
=== Studio albums ===
Title	Album details	Peak chart positions		
Title	Album details	US	US Heat	JPN
Falling Uphill	Release date: 27 May 2003; Label: Maverick; Format: CD, digital download	188	6	14
Inside the Hollow	Release date: 29 August 2006; Label: Maverick; Format: CD, digital download	—	—	48
Tigerlily	Release date: 24 August 2010; Label: World Records, Fontana North; Format: CD, digital download	—	—	283
"—" denotes a recording that did not chart or was not released in that territory.

=== Singles ===
Year	Single	Peak chart positions		Album
Year	Single	US CHR	US Pop	Album
2003	"It's About Time"	32	33	Falling Uphill
2003	"What I Like About You"	—	—	Falling Uphill
2003	"Tomorrow"	48	—	Falling Uphill
2006	"Sweet Temptation (Hollow)"	—	—	Inside the Hollow
2009	"Dance Alone"	—	—	Tigerlily
2010	"Nowhere to Run"	—	—	Tigerlily
2011	"Dreamland"	—	—	Tigerlily
2011	"Back Up Girl"	—	—	Tigerlily
"—" denotes a recording that did not chart or was not released to that format.
