= Taniec z gwiazdami season 8 =

Taniec z gwiazdami
- Season 8
- Hosted by: Piotr Gąsowski; Katarzyna Skrzynecka
- Judges: Iwona Pavlović; Piotr Galiński; Beata Tyszkiewicz; Zbigniew Wodecki
- Celebrity winner: Agata Kulesza
- Professional winner: Stefano Terazzino
- No. of episodes: 13

Release
- Original network: TVN
- Original release: 7 September – 30 November 2008

Season chronology
- ← Previous; 7 Next → 9

The 8th season of Taniec z Gwiazdami, the Polish edition of Dancing With the Stars, started on 7 September 2008 and ended on 30 November 2008. It was broadcast by TVN. Katarzyna Skrzynecka and Piotr Gąsowski continued as the hosts, and the judges were: Iwona Szymańska-Pavlović, Zbigniew Wodecki, Beata Tyszkiewicz and Piotr Galiński.

On 30 November, Agata Kulesza and her partner Stefano Terrazzino were crowned the champions.

== Couples ==
Celebrity	Occupation	Professional partner	Status
Paweł Stasiak	Papa Dance singer	Janja Lesar	Eliminated 1st on 7 September 2008
Anna Popek	TVP presenter	Cezary Olszewski †	Eliminated 2nd on 14 September 2008
Sylwia Gruchała	Olympic fencer	Rafał Maserak	Eliminated 3rd on 21 September 2008
Katarzyna Walter	Na Wspólnej actress	Krzysztof Hulboj	Eliminated 4th on 28 September 2008
Ilona Felicjańska	Model	Robert Kochanek	Eliminated 5th on 5 October 2008
Sambor Czarnota	Film and television actor	Magdalena Soszyńska-Michno	Eliminated 6th on 12 October 2008
Krzysztof Włodarczyk	Boxer	Agnieszka Pomorska	Eliminated 7th on 19 October 2008
Marek Włodarczyk	Film and television actor	Kamila Kajak	Eliminated 8th on 26 October 2008
Alan Andersz	Film and television actor	Blanka Winiarska	Eliminated 9th on 2 November 2008
Oleg Sawkin	Na Wspólnej actor	Katarzyna Krupa	Eliminated 10th on 9 November 2008
Steve Allen	Windsurfer	Anna Głogowska	Eliminated 11th on 16 November 2008
Marta Żmuda Trzebiatowska	Film and television actress	Adam Król	Third Place on 23 November 2008
Natalia Lesz	Singer and actress	Łukasz Czarnecki	Second Place on 30 November 2008
Agata Kulesza	Film and television actress	Stefano Terrazzino	Winners on 30 November 2008

== Scores ==
Couple	Place	1	2	3	4	5	6	7	8	9	10	11	12	13
Agata & Stefano	1	-	32	40†	30	37	36	40†	40†	40†	36+36=72	31+40=71	40+36=76	38+38+40=116‡
Natalia & Łukasz	2	-	32	38	35	40†	36	39	39	37	32+39=71	38+34=72	37+40=77†	38+39+40=117†
Marta & Adam	3	-	38†	37	38†	40†	34	40†	35	40†	40+36=76†	35+40=75†	33+40=73‡	
Steve & Anna	4	21‡	-	18‡	37	35	21	29	28	25‡	22+30=52‡	34+25=59‡		
Oleg & Katarzyna	5	32	-	36	34	38	40†	25‡	28	37	28+31=59			
Alan & Blanka	6	34†	-	40†	24‡	39	38	40†	31	33				
Marek & Kamila	7	33	-	24	31	31	40†	37	20‡					
Krzysztof & Agnieszka	8	24	-	30	28	28	18‡	28						
Sambor & Magdalena	9	31	-	34	31	28	23							
Ilona & Robert	10	-	22‡	21	28	22‡								
Katarzyna & Krzysztof	11	-	24	27	28									
Sylwia & Rafał	12	-	34	29										
Anna & Cezary	13	-	24											
Paweł & Janja	14	27												

Notes:

Red numbers indicate the lowest score for each week.
Green numbers indicate the highest score for each week.
indicates the couple eliminated that week.
indicates the returning couple that finished in the bottom two.
indicates the winning couple of the week.
indicates the runner-up of the week.
indicates the third place couple of the week.

== Average Chart ==
Rank by average	Place	Couple	Average	Total	Best Score	Worst Score
1.	3.	Marta Żmuda Trzebiatowska & Adam Król	38	526	40	33
2.	2.	Natalia Lesz & Łukasz Czarnecki	37	633	40	32
3.	1.	Agata Kulesza & Stefano Terazzino	37	630	40	30
4.	6.	Alan Andersz & Blanka Winiarska	35	279	40	24
5.	5.	Oleg Sawkin & Katarzyna Krupa	33	329	40	25
6.	12.	Sylwia Gruchała & Rafał Maserak	32	63	34	29
7.	7.	Marek Włodarczyk & Kamila Kajak	31	216	40	20
8.	9.	Sambor Czarnota & Magdalena Soszyńska-Michno	29	147	34	23
9.	4.	Steve Allen & Anna Głogowska	27	325	37	18
10.	14.	Paweł Stasiak & Janja Lesar	27	27	27	27
11.	11.	Katarzyna Walter & Krzysztof Hulboj	26	79	28	24
12.	8.	Krzysztof Włodarczyk & Agnieszka Pomorska	26	156	30	18
13.	13.	Anna Popek & Cezary Olszewski	24	24	24	24
14.	10.	Ilona Felicjańska & Robert Kochanek	23	93	28	21
Everyteam			33	3527		

== Average Dance Chart ==
Couples	Averages	Best Dances	Worst Dances
Marta & Adam	37.6	Salsa, Cha-Cha-Cha, Waltz, American Smooth, Quickstep, Argentine Tango (40)	Cha-Cha-Cha (33)
Natalia & Łukasz	37.2	Salsa, Argentine Tango, Freestyle (40)	Quickstep, Samba (32)
Agata & Stefano	37.1	Tango, Waltz, Cha-Cha-Cha, Rumba, Paso Doble, Argentine Tango, Freestyle (40)	Paso Doble (30)
Alan & Blanka	34.9	Jive, Paso Doble (40)	Foxtrot (24)
Oleg & Katarzyna	32.9	American Smooth (40)	Samba (25)
Sylwia & Rafał	31.5	Rumba (34)	Tango (29)
Marek & Kamila	30.9	American Smooth (40)	Cha-Cha-Cha (20)
Sambor & Magdalena	29.4	Jive (34)	Samba (23)
Steve & Anna	27.1	Foxtrot (37)	Jive (18)
Paweł & Janja	27.0	Waltz (27)	Waltz (27)
Katarzyna & Krzysztof	26.3	Foxtrot (28)	Rumba (24)
Krzysztof & Agnieszka	26.0	Jive (30)	American Smooth (18)
Anna & Cezary	24.0	Rumba (24)	Rumba (24)
Ilona & Robert	23.3	Foxtrot (28)	Tango (21)

== Highest and lowest scoring performances ==
The best and worst performances in each dance according to the judges' marks are as follows:

Dance	Best dancer	Best score	Worst dancer	Worst score
Cha Cha Cha	Agata Kulesza; Marta Żmuda Trzebiatowska	40	Marek Włodarczyk	20
Waltz	Agata Kulesza; Marta Żmuda Trzebiatowska	40	Steve Allen	21
Quickstep	Marta Żmuda Trzebiatowska	40	Natalia Lesz; Agata Kulesza	32
Rumba	Agata Kulesza	40	Steve Allen; Ilona Felicjańska	22
Jive	Alan Andersz	40	Steve Allen	18
Tango	Agata Kulesza	40	Ilona Felicjańska	21
Foxtrot	Natalia Lesz	39	Alan Andersz	24
Paso Doble	Agata Kulesza; Alan Andersz	40	Krzysztof Włodarczyk	28
Samba	Alan Andersz	38	Steve Allen	21
Viennese Waltz	Alan Andersz	39	Krzysztof Włodarczyk; Sambor Czarnota	28
American Smooth	Marta Żmuda Trzebiatowska; Oleg Sawkin; Marek Włodarczyk	40	Krzysztof Włodarczyk	18
Salsa	Natalia Lesz; Marta Żmuda Trzebiatowska	40	Ilona Felicjańska	22
Argentine Tango	Agata Kulesza; Natalia Lesz; Marta Żmuda Trzebiatowska	40		
Freestyle	Agata Kulesza; Natalia Lesz	40		

== The Best Score (40) ==
No.	Couple	Dance	Episode	Perfect Score
1	Alan Andersz & Blanka Winiarska	Jive	3	2
1	Alan Andersz & Blanka Winiarska	Paso Doble	7	2
4	Agata Kulesza & Stefano Terrazzino	Tango	3	7
4	Agata Kulesza & Stefano Terrazzino	Waltz	7	7
4	Agata Kulesza & Stefano Terrazzino	Cha Cha Cha	8	7
4	Agata Kulesza & Stefano Terrazzino	Rumba	9	7
4	Agata Kulesza & Stefano Terrazzino	Paso Doble	11	7
4	Agata Kulesza & Stefano Terrazzino	Argentine Tango	12	7
4	Agata Kulesza & Stefano Terrazzino	Freestyle	13	7
8	Natalia Lesz & Łukasz Czarnecki	Salsa	5	3
8	Natalia Lesz & Łukasz Czarnecki	Argentine Tango	12	3
8	Natalia Lesz & Łukasz Czarnecki	Freestyle	13	3
9	Oleg Sawkin & Katarzyna Krupa	American Smooth	6	1
11	Marek Włodarczyk & Kamila Kajak	American Smooth	6	1
12	Marta Żmuda Trzebiatowska & Adam Król	Salsa	5	6
12	Marta Żmuda Trzebiatowska & Adam Król	Cha Cha Cha	7	6
12	Marta Żmuda Trzebiatowska & Adam Król	Waltz	9	6
12	Marta Żmuda Trzebiatowska & Adam Król	American Smooth	10	6
12	Marta Żmuda Trzebiatowska & Adam Król	Quickstep	11	6
12	Marta Żmuda Trzebiatowska & Adam Król	Argentine Tango	12	6

== Episodes ==
Individual judges scores in charts below (given in parentheses) are listed in this order from left to right: Iwona Szymańska-Pavlović, Zbigniew Wodecki, Beata Tyszkiewicz and Piotr Galiński.

=== Week 1 ===
Running order

Couple	Score	Style	Music
Alan & Blanka	34 (8,8,10,8)	Cha-Cha-Cha	"Daddy Cool"—Boney M.
Paweł & Janja	27 (5,8,9,5)	Waltz	"Blue Eyes"—Elton John
Krzysztof & Agnieszka	24 (4,7,9,4)	Cha-Cha-Cha	"Uptown Girl"—Billy Joel
Steve & Anna	21 (3,7,9,2)	Waltz	"Kiss from a Rose"—Seal
Oleg & Katarzyna	32 (7,9,10,6)	Cha-Cha-Cha	"Easy Lover"—Philip Bailey
Marek & Kamila	33 (7,9,10,7)	Waltz	"I Will Always Love You"—Dolly Parton
Sambor & Magdalena	31 (6,8,10,7)	Cha-Cha-Cha	"I'm Every Woman"—Whitney Houston
Ilona & Robert; Agata & Stefano; Katarzyna & Krzysztof; Natalia & Łukasz; Anna & Cezary; Marta & Adam; Sylwia & Rafał	N/A	Group Salsa	"Sun Sun Babe"—Tito Rodriguez

=== Week 2 ===
Running order

Couple	Score	Style	Music
Ilona & Robert	22 (3,7,9,3)	Rumba	"If You Leave Me Now"—Chicago
Agata & Stefano	32 (7,9,9,7)	Quickstep	"Good Morning" from Babes in Arms
Katarzyna & Krzysztof	24 (2,9,9,4)	Rumba	"You'll Never Find Another Love Like Mine"—Lou Rawls
Natalia & Łukasz	32 (7,8,10,7)	Quickstep	"Red Hot"—Billy Lee Riley
Anna & Cezary	24 (3,9,9,3)	Rumba	"What's Love Got to Do with It"—Tina Turner
Marta & Adam	38 (9,10,10,9)	Quickstep	"Mrs. Robinson"—Simon and Garfunkel
Sylwia & Rafał	34 (8,9,9,8)	Rumba	"Jak anioła głos"—Feel
Alan & Blanka; Krzysztof & Agnieszka; Steve & Anna; Oleg & Katarzyna; Marek & Kamila; Sambor & Magdalena	N/A	Group Swing	"Supermenka"—Kayah

=== Week 3 ===
Running order

Couple	Score	Style	Music
Oleg & Katarzyna	36 (8,10,10,8)	Jive	"I Got a Girl"—Lou Bega
Sylwia & Rafał	29 (6,9,9,5)	Tango	"She Bangs"—Ricky Martin
Steve & Anna	18 (3,7,7,1)	Jive	"This Ole House"—Stuart Hamblen
Natalia & Łukasz	38 (9,10,10,9)	Tango	"Cell Block Tango" from Chicago
Sambor & Magdalena	34 (8,9,9,8)	Jive	"Boogie Woogie Bugle Boy"—The Andrews Sisters
Marta & Adam	37 (8,10,10,9)	Tango	"Sway"—Dean Martin
Krzysztof & Agnieszka	30 (5,9,9,7)	Jive	"Man! I Feel Like a Woman!"—Shania Twain
Ilona & Robert	21 (2,8,9,2)	Tango	"Blue Tango"—Leroy Anderson
Marek & Kamila	24 (4,8,9,3)	Jive	"Cry Just a Little Bit"—Shakin' Stevens
Katarzyna & Krzysztof	27 (3,10,10,4)	Tango	"Tango Notturno"—Hans-Otto Borgmann
Alan & Blanka	40 (10,10,10,10)	Jive	"Do You Love Me"—The Contours
Agata & Stefano	40 (10,10,10,10)	Tango	"Tabakiera"—Kayah & Goran Bregović

=== Week 4 ===
Running order

Couple	Score	Style	Music
Natalia & Łukasz	35 (8,8,10,9)	Paso Doble	"Viva España"—L. Caerters
Sambor & Magdalena	31 (7,8,9,7)	Foxtrot	"Manhattan"—Richard Rodgers
Agata & Stefano	30 (7,7,9,7)	Paso Doble	"Sweet Child o' Mine"—Guns N' Roses
Alan & Blanka	24 (3,9,8,4)	Foxtrot	"Swinging on a Star"—Bing Crosby
Krzysztof & Agnieszka	28 (5,8,9,6)	Paso Doble	"El Gato Montes"—Manuel Penella
Ilona & Robert	28 (6,8,9,5)	Foxtrot	"Summertime"—George Gershwin
Marek & Kamila	31 (6,8,10,7)	Paso Doble	"Steam"—Peter Gabriel
Katarzyna & Krzysztof	28 (5,8,10,5)	Foxtrot	"Why Don't You Do Right?"—Peggy Lee
Oleg & Katarzyna	34 (7,9,10,8)	Paso Doble	"El Conquistador" — Jose Esparza
Steve & Anna	37 (9,9,10,9)	Foxtrot	"As Time Goes By"—Dooley Wilson
Marta & Adam	38 (9,10,10,9)	Paso Doble	"Pride (In the Name of Love)"—U2

=== Week 5 ===
Running order

Couple	Score	Style	Music
Krzysztof & Angieszka	28 (6,8,9,5)	Viennese Waltz	"The Sleeping Beauty"—Pyotr Ilyich Tchaikovsky
Marek & Kamila	31 (7,8,9,7)	Viennese Waltz	"The Merry Widow"—Franz Lehár
Marta & Adam	40 (10,10,10,10)	Salsa	"La Vida es un Carnaval"—Celia Cruz
Sambor & Magdalena	28 (6,8,9,5)	Viennese Waltz	"Only Hope"—Switchfoot
Ilona & Robert	22 (3,8,9,2)	Salsa	"Aguanile"—Marc Anthony
Steve & Anna	35 (8,9,10,8)	Viennese Waltz	"Con te partirò"—Andrea Bocelli
Natalia & Łukasz	40 (10,10,10,10)	Salsa	"Cachoneda"—Cheo Feliciano
Alan & Blanka	39 (9,10,10,10)	Viennese Waltz	"The Lost World: Jurassic Park" theme song
Agata & Stefano	37 (9,9,10,9)	Salsa	"El Nuevo Swing"—Carlos Pabón
Oleg & Katarzyna	38 (9,10,10,9)	Viennese Waltz	"Trędowata"—Wojciech Kilar

=== Week 6 ===
Running order

Couple	Score	Style	Music
Sambor & Magdalena	23 (5,7,8,3)	Samba	"La Bamba"—Ritchie Valens
Natalia & Łukasz	36 (9,9,10,8)	American Smooth	"Szanujmy wspomnienia"—Skaldowie
Alan & Blanka	38 (9,10,10,9)	Samba	"Hafanana"—Afric Simone
Krzysztof & Agnieszka	18 (2,7,8,1)	American Smooth	"The Way You Make Me Feel"—Ronan Keating
Marta & Adam	34 (7,9,10,8)	Samba	"Śpij kochanie, śpij"—Kayah & Goran Bregović
Marek & Kamila	40 (10,10,10,10)	American Smooth	"The Girl from Ipanema"—Antônio Carlos Jobim
Agata & Stefano	36 (8,10,10,8)	Samba	"Baila Mi Rumba"—José Luis Rodríguez
Oleg & Katarzyna	40 (10,10,10,10)	American Smooth	"I Can't Help Myself (Sugar Pie Honey Bunch)"—Four Tops
Steve & Anna	21 (4,8,8,1)	Samba	"Mercy Mercy Me (The Ecology)"—Marvin Gaye

=== Week 7: ABBA Week ===
Running order

Couple	Score	Style	Music
Marek & Kamila	37 (8,10,10,9)	Tango	"Money, Money, Money"—ABBA
Krzysztof & Agnieszka	28 (5,8,9,6)	Tango	"Voulez-Vous"—ABBA
Natalia & Łukasz	39 (9,10,10,10)	Cha-Cha-Cha	"Super Trouper"—ABBA
Alan & Blanka	40 (10,10,10,10)	Paso Doble	"Gimme! Gimme! Gimme! (A Man After Midnight)"—ABBA
Marta & Adam	40 (10,10,10,10)	Cha-Cha-Cha	"S.O.S."—ABBA
Steve & Anna	29 (6,8,9,6)	Tango	"Mamma Mia"—ABBA
Oleg & Katarzyna	25 (4,9,9,3)	Samba	"Dancing Queen"—ABBA
Agata & Stefano	40 (10,10,10,10)	Waltz	"The Winner Takes It All"—ABBA

=== Week 8: Spanish Week ===
Running order

Couple	Score	Style	Music
Oleg & Katarzyna	28 (5,8,9,6)	Rumba	"Con los años que me quedan"—Gloria Estefan
Marek & Kamila	20 (1,7,10,2)	Cha-Cha-Cha	"Oye Como Va"—Tito Puente
Natalia & Łukasz	39 (9,10,10,10)	Rumba	"Sabor a Mí"—Luis Miguel
Steve & Anna	28 (6,7,9,6)	Salsa	"Mi Mulata" — Frankie Negron
Agata & Stefano	40 (10,10,10,10)	Cha-Cha-Cha	"¿Dónde estabas tú?"—Omara Portuondo
Marta & Adam	35 (8,10,10,7)	Rumba	"Lola, Lola"—Ricky Martin
Alan & Blanka	31 (7,8,9,7)	Salsa	"No se por que me echo bilongo"—Yumuri
Oleg & Katarzyna; Marek & Kamila; Natalia & Łukasz; Steve & Anna; Agata & Stefano; Marta & Adam; Alan & Blanka	N/A	Group Mambo	"Dame cinco"—Mambomania

=== Week 9: Disney's Fairytales Themes Week ===
Running order

Couple	Score	Style	Music	Movie
Marta & Adam	40 (10,10,10,10)	Waltz	"Can You Feel the Love Tonight"—Elton John	The Lion King
Steve & Anna	25 (4,8,8,5)	Cha-Cha-Cha	"I Won't Say (I'm in Love)"—Susan Egan	Hercules
Oleg & Katarzyna	37 (8,10,10,9)	Quickstep	"The Bare Necessities"—Phil Harris & Bruce Reitherman	The Jungle Book
Alan & Blanka	33 (7,9,9,8)	Quickstep	"I Wan'na Be Like You (The Monkey Song)"—Louis Prima	The Jungle Book
Agata & Stefano	40 (10,10,10,10)	Rumba	"A Whole New World"—Brad Kane & Lea Salonga	Aladdin
Natalia & Łukasz	37 (8,10,10,9)	Waltz	"Someday My Prince Will Come"—Adriana Caselotti	Snow White and the Seven Dwarfs
Marta & Adam; Steve & Anna; Oleg & Katarzyna; Alan & Blanka; Agata & Stefano; Natalia & Łukasz	N/A	Group Viennese Waltz	"A Dream Is a Wish Your Heart Makes"—Ilene Woods	Cinderella

=== Week 10: Polish Week ===
Running order

Couple	Score	Style	Music
Agata & Stefano	36 (7,10,10,9)	Jive	"Ale wkoło jest wesoło"—Perfect
Agata & Stefano	36 (8,9,10,9)	Quickstep	"Parostatek"—Krzysztof Krawczyk
Oleg & Katarzyna	28 (6,8,9,5)	Tango	"Wieża radości, wieża samotności"—Sztywny Pal Azji
Oleg & Katarzyna	31 (5,9,9,8)	Rumba	"Siódmy rok"—Andrzej Zaucha
Natalia & Łukasz	32 (6,9,9,8)	Samba	"Tyle słońca w całym mieście"—Anna Jantar
Natalia & Łukasz	39 (9,10,10,10)	Foxtrot	"Bardzo smutna piosenka retro"—Pod Budą
Marta & Adam	40 (10,10,10,10)	American Smooth	"Bądź moim natchnieniem"—Andrzej Zaucha
Marta & Adam	36 (8,10,10,8)	Salsa	"W moim magicznym domu"—Hanna Banaszak
Steve & Anna	22 (4,8,8,2)	Rumba	"Żałuję"—Ewelina Flinta
Steve & Anna	30 (7,8,9,6)	Waltz	"Czas nie będzie czekał"—Blue Café

=== Week 11 ===
Running order

Couple	Score	Style	Music
Natalia & Łukasz	38 (9,10,10,9)	Jive	"The Heat Is On"—Glenn Frey
Natalia & Łukasz	34 (7,10,10,7)	Quickstep	"This Love"—Maroon 5
Steve & Anna	34 (8,9,9,8)	American Smooth	"The Best Is Yet to Come"—Frank Sinatra
Steve & Anna	25 (5,8,8,4)	Samba	"Temptation"—Arash Labaf
Marta & Adam	35 (7,9,10,9)	Jive	"Take On Me"—a-ha
Marta & Adam	40 (10,10,10,10)	Quickstep	"Bye Bye Love"—The Everly Brothers
Agata & Stefano	31 (6,9,9,7)	Foxtrot	"The Way You Look Tonight"—Fred Astaire
Agata & Stefano	40 (10,10,10,10)	Paso Doble	"Paso Royale"—Engelbert Humperdinck

=== Week 12 ===
Running order

Couple	Score	Style	Music
Marta & Adam	33 (7,9,9,8)	Cha-Cha-Cha	"I Wanna Dance with Somebody (Who Loves Me)"—Whitney Houston
Marta & Adam	40 (10,10,10,10)	Argentine Tango	"El Choclo" — Ángel Villoldo
Agata & Stefano	40 (10,10,10,10)	Argentine Tango	"Tanguera"—Mariano Mores
Agata & Stefano	36 (8,10,10,8)	Rumba	"I Just Called to Say I Love You"—Stevie Wonder
Natalia & Łukasz	37 (8,9,10,10)	Salsa	"Serial Dancer"—Marc Vorchin
Natalia & Łukasz	40 (10,10,10,10)	Argentine Tango	"La Cumparsita"—Gerardo Matos Rodríguez

=== Week 13: Final ===
Running order

Couple	Score	Style	Music
Natalia & Łukasz	38 (9,9,10,10)	Rumba	"Sabor a Mí"—Luis Miguel
Natalia & Łukasz	39 (9,10,10,10)	Tango	"Cell Block Tango" from Chicago
Natalia & Łukasz	40 (10,10,10,10)	Freestyle	"Ostatni"—Edyta Bartosiewicz
Agata & Stefano	38 (8,10,10,10)	Cha-Cha-Cha	"¿Dónde Estabas Tú?"—Omara Portuondo
Agata & Stefano	38 (9,10,10,9)	Waltz	"The Winner Takes It All"—ABBA
Agata & Stefano	40 (10,10,10,10)	Freestyle	"Song from a Secret Garden"—Secret Garden

Other dances

Couple	Style	Music
Marta & Adam	Waltz	"Can You Feel the Love Tonight"—Elton John
Steve & Anna	Foxtrot	"As Time Goes By" — Dooley Wilson
Oleg & Katarzyna	Viennese Waltz	"Trędowata" — Wojciech Kilar
Alan & Blanka	Jive	"Do You Love Me"—The Contours
Marek & Kamila	Tango	"Money, Money, Money"—ABBA
Krzysztof & Agnieszka	Jive	"Man! I Feel Like a Woman!"—Shania Twain
Sambor & Magdalena	Viennese Waltz	"Only Hope"—Switchfoot
Ilona & Robert	Tango	"Blue Tango"—Leroy Anderson
Katarzyna & Krzysztof	Foxtrot	"Why Don't You Do Right?"—Peggy Lee
Sylwia & Rafał	Tango	"She Bangs"—Ricky Martin
Anna & Cezary	Rumba	"What's Love Got to Do with It"—Tina Turner
Paweł & Janja	Waltz	"Blue Eyes"—Elton John
Magdalena Walach & Cezary Olszewski (7th season winners)	Argentine Tango	"Por una Cabeza"—Carlos Gardel
Paweł & Janja; Anna & Cezary; Sylwia & Rafał; Katarzyna & Krzysztof; Ilona & Robert; Sambor & Magdalena; Krzysztof & Agnieszka; Marek & Kamila; Alan & Blanka; Oleg & Katarzyna; Steve & Anna; Marta & Adam; Natalia & Łukasz; Agata & Stefano	Group Freestyle	"We Are Family"—Sister Sledge

== Dance chart ==
The celebrities and professional partners danced one of these routines for each corresponding week.

- Week 1 (Season Premiere): Cha-Cha-Cha or Waltz (Men) & Group Salsa (Women)
- Week 2: Rumba or Quickstep (Women) & Group Swing (Men)
- Week 3: Jive or Tango
- Week 4: Paso Doble or Foxtrot
- Week 5: Salsa or Viennese Waltz
- Week 6: Samba or American Smooth
- Week 7 (ABBA Week): One unlearned dance (ABBA Week)
- Week 8 (Spanish Week): One unlearned dance & Group Mambo
- Week 9 (Disney Week): One unlearned dance & Group Viennese Waltz
- Week 10 (Polish Week): One unlearned & one repeated dance
  Natalia & Łukasz: One unlearned Latin dance & One unlearned Ballroom dance
- Week 11: One unlearned & one repeated dance
- Week 12 (The Semifinal): Argentine Tango & one repeated Latin dance
- Week 13 (The Final): Favorite Latin dance, favorite Ballroom dance & Freestyle

Couple	Week 1	Week 2	Week 3	Week 4	Week 5	Week 6	Week 7	Week 8		Week 9		Week 10		Week 11		Week 12		Week 13 Final		
Agata & Stefano	Group Salsa	Quickstep	Tango	Paso Doble	Salsa	Samba	Waltz	Cha-Cha-Cha	Group Mambo	Rumba	Group Viennese Waltz	Jive	Quickstep	Foxtrot	Paso Doble	Argentine Tango	Rumba	Cha-Cha-Cha	Waltz	Freestyle
Natalia & Łukasz	Group Salsa	Quickstep	Tango	Paso Doble	Salsa	American Smooth	Cha-Cha-Cha	Rumba	Group Mambo	Waltz	Group Viennese Waltz	Samba	Foxtrot	Jive	Quickstep	Salsa	Argentine Tango	Rumba	Tango	Freestyle
Marta & Adam	Group Salsa	Quickstep	Tango	Paso Doble	Salsa	Samba	Cha-Cha-Cha	Rumba	Group Mambo	Waltz	Group Viennese Waltz	American Smooth	Salsa	Jive	Quickstep	Cha-Cha-Cha	Argentine Tango			Waltz
Steve & Anna	Waltz	Group Swing	Jive	Foxtrot	Viennese Waltz	Samba	Tango	Salsa	Group Mambo	Cha-Cha-Cha	Group Viennese Waltz	Rumba	Waltz	American Smooth	Samba					Foxtrot
Oleg & Katarzyna	Cha-Cha-Cha	Group Swing	Jive	Paso Doble	Viennese Waltz	American Smooth	Samba	Rumba	Group Mambo	Quickstep	Group Viennese Waltz	Tango	Rumba							Viennese Waltz
Alan & Blanka	Cha-Cha-Cha	Group Swing	Jive	Foxtrot	Viennese Waltz	Samba	Paso Doble	Salsa	Group Mambo	Quickstep	Group Viennese Waltz									Jive
Marek & Kamila	Waltz	Group Swing	Jive	Paso Doble	Viennese Waltz	American Smooth	Tango	Cha-Cha-Cha	Group Mambo											Tango
Krzysztof & Agnieszka	Cha-Cha-Cha	Group Swing	Jive	Paso Doble	Viennese Waltz	American Smooth	Tango													Jive
Sambor & Magdalena	Cha-Cha-Cha	Group Swing	Jive	Foxtrot	Viennese Waltz	Samba														Viennese Waltz
Ilona & Robert	Group Salsa	Rumba	Tango	Foxtrot	Salsa															Tango
Katarzyna & Krzysztof	Group Salsa	Rumba	Tango	Foxtrot																Foxtrot
Sylwia & Rafał	Group Salsa	Rumba	Tango																	Tango
Anna & Cezary	Group Salsa	Rumba																		Rumba
Paweł & Janja	Waltz																			Waltz

Highest scoring dance
Lowest scoring dance
Performed, but not scored

== Weekly results ==
The order is based on the judges' scores combined with the viewers' votes.

Order	Week 1	Week 2	Week 3	Week 4	Week 5	Week 6	Week 7	Week 8	Week 9	Week 10	Week 11	Week 12	Week 13 Final
1	Alan & Blanka	Marta & Adam	Alan & Blanka	Marta & Adam	Marta & Adam	Oleg & Katarzyna	Agata & Stefano	Agata & Stefano	Agata & Stefano	Agata & Stefano	Marta & Adam	Agata & Stefano	Agata & Stefano
2	Oleg & Katarzyna	Sylwia & Rafał	Agata & Stefano	Steve & Anna	Natalia & Łukasz	Marek & Kamila	Marta & Adam	Marta & Adam	Marta & Adam	Marta & Adam	Agata & Stefano	Natalia & Łukasz	Natalia & Łukasz
3	Steve & Anna	Agata & Stefano	Marta & Adam	Oleg & Katarzyna	Oleg & Katarzyna	Marta & Adam	Natalia & Łukasz	Natalia & Łukasz	Natalia & Łukasz	Natalia & Łukasz	Natalia & Łukasz	Marta & Adam	
4	Marek & Kamila	Katarzyna & Krzysztof	Natalia & Łukasz	Natalia & Łukasz	Agata & Stefano	Alan & Blanka	Alan & Blanka	Oleg & Katarzyna	Oleg & Katarzyna	Steve & Anna	Steve & Anna		
5	Sambor & Magdalena	Natalia & Łukasz	Steve & Anna	Alan & Blanka	Alan & Blanka	Steve & Anna	Oleg & Katarzyna	Steve & Anna	Steve & Anna	Oleg & Katarzyna			
6	Krzysztof & Agnieszka	Ilona & Robert	Krzysztof & Agnieszka	Marek & Kamila	Steve & Anna	Agata & Stefano	Steve & Anna	Alan & Blanka	Alan & Blanka				
7	Paweł & Janja	Anna & Cezary	Sambor & Magdalena	Krzysztof & Agnieszka	Sambor & Magdalena	Natalia & Łukasz	Marek & Kamila	Marek & Kamila					
8			Ilona & Robert	Agata & Stefano	Krzysztof & Agnieszka	Krzysztof & Agnieszka	Krzysztof & Agnieszka						
9			Marek & Kamila	Sambor & Magdalena	Marek & Kamila	Sambor & Magdalena							
10			Oleg & Katarzyna	Ilona & Robert	Ilona & Robert								
11			Katarzyna & Krzysztof	Katarzyna & Krzysztof									
12			Sylwia & Rafał										

This couple came in first place with the judges.
This couple came in first place with the judges and gained the highest number of viewers' votes.
This couple gained the highest number of viewers' votes.
This couple came in last place with the judges and gained the highest number of viewers' votes.
This couple came in last place with the judges.
This couple came in last place with the judges and was eliminated.
This couple was eliminated.
This couple won the competition.
This couple came in second in the competition.
This couple came in third in the competition.

== Audience voting results ==
The percentage of votes cast by a couple in a particular week is given in parentheses.

Order	Week 1	Week 2	Week 3	Week 4	Week 5	Week 6	Week 7	Week 8	Week 9	Week 10	Week 11	Week 12	Week 13 Final
1	Steve & Anna (25.72)	Marta & Adam (48.08)	Steve & Anna (17.37)	Alan & Blanka (22.94)	Marta & Adam (22.1)	Marta & Adam (17.52)	Oleg & Katarzyna (32.65)	Agata & Stefano (22.21)	Agata & Stefano (30.78)	Agata & Stefano (24.44)	Agata & Stefano (43.69)	Agata & Stefano (37.24)	Agata & Stefano (69.1)
2	Oleg & Katarzyna (16.01)	Sylwia & Rafał (16.41)	Alan & Blanka (16.83)	Marta & Adam (15.26)	Oleg & Katarzyna (14.45)	Oleg & Katarzyna (15.99)	Agata & Stefano (18.73)	Marta & Adam (17.64)	Marta & Adam (17.42)	Marta & Adam (23.33)	Marta & Adam (25.63)	Marta & Adam (32.45)	Natalia & Łukasz (30.9)
3	Alan & Blanka (15.58)	Katarzyna & Krzysztof (8.43)	Marta & Adam (16.28)	Steve & Anna (14.18)	Natalia & Łukasz (10.79)	Steve & Anna (14.73)	Natalia & Łukasz (13.3)	Natalia & Łukasz (14.69)	Natalia & Łukasz (15.04)	Steve & Anna (18.73)	Natalia & Łukasz (17.43)	Natalia & Łukasz (30.31)	
4	Krzysztof & Agnieszka (12.81)	Agata & Stefano (8.06)	Agata & Stefano (14.43)	Oleg & Katarzyna (10.78)	Agata & Stefano (9.2)	Krzysztof & Agnieszka (13.24)	Marta & Adam (12.27)	Oleg & Katarzyna (13.72)	Steve & Anna (13.78)	Natalia & Łukasz (17.45)	Steve & Anna (13.25)		
5	Sambor & Magdalena (12.52)	Ilona & Robert (6.93)	Natalia & Łukasz (9.4)	Natalia & Łukasz (9.07)	Steve & Anna (8.52)	Marek & Kamila (9.69)	Steve & Anna (9.22)	Marek & Kamila (12.23)	Alan & Blanka (12.48)	Oleg & Katarzyna (16.05)			
6	Marek & Kamila (12.14)	Natalia & Łukasz (6.91)	Ilona & Robert (4.73)	Krzysztof & Agnieszka (6.68)	Alan & Blanka (8.49)	Alan & Blanka (8.52)	Alan & Blanka (6.55)	Steve & Anna (10.97)	Oleg & Katarzyna (10.5)				
7	Paweł & Janja (5.22)	Anna & Cezary (5.18)	Marek & Kamila (4.68)	Agata & Stefano (5.39)	Sambor & Magdalena (7.24)	Agata & Stefano (7.68)	Marek & Kamila (4.22)	Alan & Blanka (8.54)					
8			Krzysztof & Agnieszka (3.59)	Marek & Kamila (4.79)	Krzysztof & Agnieszka (7.05)	Natalia & Łukasz (7.59)	Krzysztof & Agnieszka (3.07)						
9			Sambor & Magdalena (3.35)	Ilona & Robert (3.99)	Marek & Kamila (6.29)	Sambor & Magdalena (5.04)							
10			Katarzyna & Krzysztof (3.28)	Sambor & Magdalena (3.93)	Ilona & Robert (5.87)								
11			Sylwia & Rafał (3.14)	Katarzyna & Krzysztof (2.99)									
12			Oleg & Katarzyna (2.92)										

== Guest performances ==
Episode	Date	Singer/Star	Song	Dancers
1	7 September 2008	Katarzyna Skrzynecka & Piotr Gąsowski	"I'm in Heaven"	Group VOLT
2	14 September 2008	Tomasz Szymuś's Orchestra		Group VOLT
3	21 September 2008	Tomasz Szymuś's Orchestra	"Candyman"	Group VOLT
4	28 September 2008	Tomasz Szymuś's Orchestra	"Cabaret"	Group VOLT
5	5 October 2008	Garou	"Stand Up"	Group VOLT
5	5 October 2008	Garou	"Gitan"	-
6	12 October 2008	Danny	"Tokyo"	Group VOLT
6	12 October 2008	Tomasz Szymuś's Orchestra	"Get the Party Started"	Group VOLT
7	19 October 2008	Tomasz Szymuś's Orchestra	"Waterloo"	Group VOLT
8	26 October 2008	Enrique Iglesias	"Tired of Being Sorry"	-
8	26 October 2008	Enrique Iglesias	"Away"	-
9	2 November 2008	Tomasz Szymuś's Orchestra	"When You Wish Upon a Star"	Group Mała Gracja
10	9 November 2008	Maryla Rodowicz	"Małgośka"	Group VOLT
10	9 November 2008	Maryla Rodowicz	"Na odległość"	Group VOLT
11	16 November 2008	Piotr Polk	"L-O-V-E"	Group VOLT
11	16 November 2008	Tomasz Szymuś's Orchestra	"Queen of the Night"	Group VOLT
12	23 November 2008	Matt Pokora	"Catch Me If You Can" "Dangerous"	Group VOLT
12	23 November 2008	Matt Pokora	"Through the Eyes"	-
13	30 November 2008	Chris de Burgh	"Don't Pay the Ferryman"
13	30 November 2008	Chris de Burgh	"Lady in Red"

== Rating figures ==
Episode	Date	Official rating 4+	Share 4+	Share 16-39
1	7 September 2008	4 295 811	29,15%	28,52%
2	14 September 2008	4 481 064	28,19%	26,22%
3	21 September 2008	4 699 663	29,20%	26,13%
4	28 September 2008	4 439 893	29,07%	25,06%
5	5 October 2008	5 029 136	32,16%	28,78%
6	12 October 2008	4 420 153	27,38%	24,18%
7	19 October 2008	5 082 535	30,69%	27,73%
8	26 October 2008	4 739 194	29,28%	25,79%
9	2 November 2008	4 780 743	29,05%	25,99%
10	9 November 2008	4 481 183	29,02%	24,87%
11	16 November 2008	4 969 114	29,18%	26,05%
12	23 November 2008	5 005 415	28,56%	25,15%
13	30 November 2008	5 263 613	31,34%	29,45%
Average	Season 8	4 742 462	29,46%	26,51%
