= Turn On the Lights =

Turn On the Lights may refer to:

- Turn On the Lights (album), a 2012 album by Daniel Powter
- "Turn On the Lights" (song), a 2012 song by Future
