= Styrofoam (disambiguation) =

Styrofoam is a brand of insulation made from extruded polystyrene foam.

Styrofoam may also refer to:

- "Styrofoam", a 2005 song by Daniel Powter from his album Daniel Powter
- Styrofoam (musician) (born 1973), Belgian electronic music artist
- Styrofoam, colloquial name for expanded polystyrene used in packaging and containers
