= Daniel Powter =

Canadian musician (born 1971)

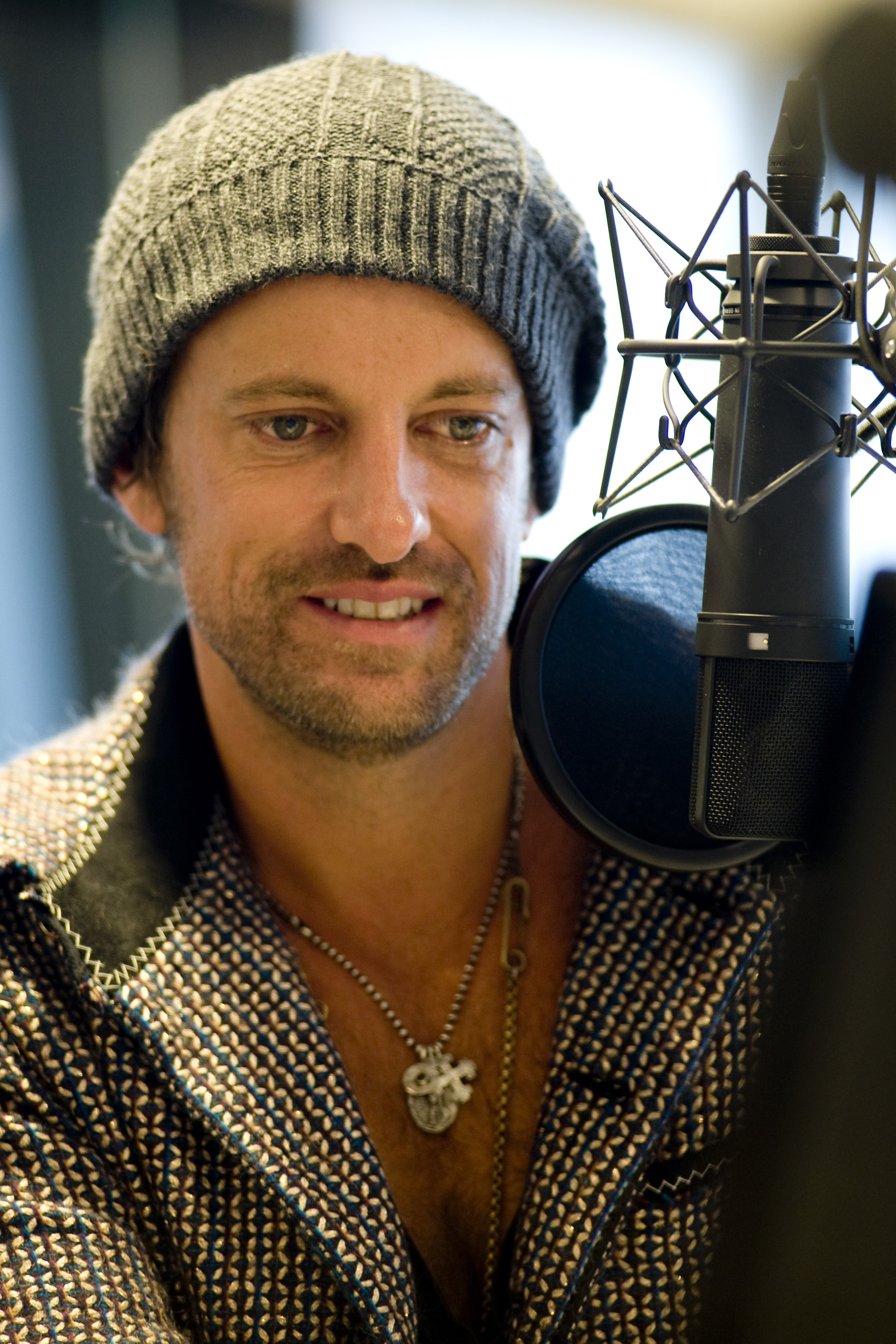
- Powter in 2009

Background information
- Born: Daniel Richard Powter; February 25, 1971 (age 55); Vernon, British Columbia, Canada
- Genres: Pop rock; alternative rock
- Occupations: Singer; songwriter
- Years active: 1984–present
- Labels: Outside; Warner; Avex; EMI; Unleashed; KDS Farrell, Inc
- Website: danielpowter.com

Daniel Richard Powter (/ˈpaʊtər/; born February 25, 1971) is a Canadian singer-songwriter. His 2005 pop single "Bad Day" topped the Billboard Hot 100 for five weeks. He was nominated for Best Male Pop Vocal Performance at the 49th Grammy Awards for "Bad Day" and won the Juno Award for Breakthrough Artist of the Year in 2006.

Powter's subsequent work never reached the same success as "Bad Day", with Billboard dubbing him the top "one-hit wonder" of the 2000s.

== Early life ==
Powter grew up in Coldstream, outside of Vernon, in the Okanagan Valley region of British Columbia. Powter started playing the violin at four years old. He changed to piano at 16 years old due to bullying.

Powter studied at MacEwan University but dropped out—partially due to his dyslexia—to pursue music full time.

== Career ==
Powter started a pop rock band in Victoria, British Columbia. The band won an award, which allowed them to produce a CD. Powter also worked as a keyboardist on The Chris Isaak Show.

In his late twenties, Powter met producer Jeff Dawson in Vancouver. With Dawson producing, Powter released his debut album I'm Your Betty on June 21, 2000 through indie label Outside Music. A few songs on the album appeared on the Canadian television show Higher Ground.

=== "Bad Day" and self-titled album (2005–2007) ===
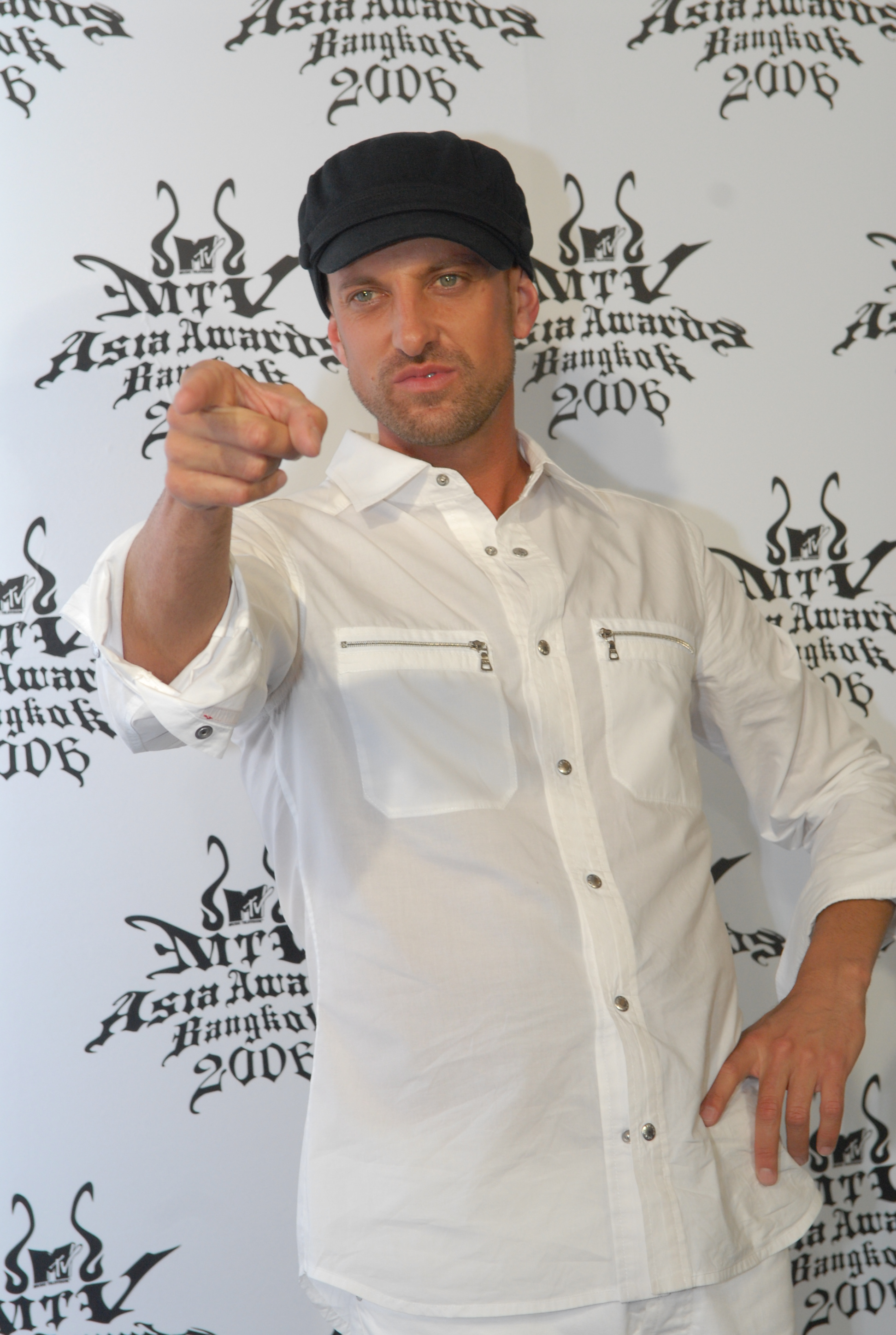
Powter at the MTV Asia Awards 2006 in Bangkok, Thailand.

Powter wrote the hook to "Bad Day" while on a ferry ride between Victoria and Vancouver. Powter wrote the song with a negative connotation to avoid sounding cheesy and chose "bad day" because it sang well. Powter recorded a demo for "Bad Day" with producer Jeff Dawson and fielded inquiries with several music labels. After acquiring a music manager in Los Angeles, he signed with Warner Bros. Music and recorded his 2005 self titled album with Mitchell Froom co-producing.

Powter's first single, "Bad Day", was first released in Europe in mid-2005, in advance of his second album, Daniel Powter. Warner Bros. Records submitted the single for commercials, and it was subsequently chosen by Coca-Cola as the theme song for an ad campaign in Europe. The song achieved heavy airplay in most European countries, peaking at number three on the overall European airplay chart. It reached number one on national airplay in Germany, number one on the singles charts in the Republic of Ireland and Italy, number two in the United Kingdom—where it stayed in the top ten for thirteen weeks—and number three in Australia.

In the United States, "Bad Day" was used extensively on the television series American Idol in its fifth season. Powter sang the song live at the end of the final show of that season on May 23, 2006. The song reached number one on the Billboard Hot 100, Adult Top 40 and Adult Contemporary charts, making Powter the first solo Canadian male artist to top the Hot 100 since Bryan Adams in 1995 (with "Have You Ever Really Loved a Woman?"). The song also reached number one in Powter's homeland, Canada.

On May 31, 2005, Powter released his first extended play known as "Free Loop."

On July 2, 2005, Powter performed at the Berlin installment of Live 8, a simultaneous group of concerts in nine countries intended to raise awareness of poverty in Africa.

"Bad Day" came in fifth in the British Record of the Year 2005. In 2006, Powter won in the New Artist of the Year category at the Canadian Juno Awards, and was nominated for Best International Breakthrough Act at the BRIT Awards. "Bad Day" was nominated at the 2006 Billboard Music Awards for Hot 100 Single of the Year, and was named Billboard magazine's song of the year in 2006. At the 2007 Grammy Awards, Powter received a Best Male Pop Vocal Performance nomination for the song.

The subsequent singles from Daniel Powter – "Jimmy Gets High", "Free Loop", and "Lie to Me" – were released in different parts of the world, each failing to match the success of "Bad Day". "Free Loop" was deemed chart ineligible in the UK (as the release included a version of "Bad Day" as a B-side whilst "Bad Day" was still in the chart, hence breaking chart rules) and failed to chart in the U.S., though it reached the top forty on the Adult Contemporary chart. Following the release of "Lie to Me", "Jimmy Gets High" was to be the fourth single from the album in the UK, but its release was cancelled. A new track called "Love You Lately" was released as the next U.S. single, preceding a re-release of the album Daniel Powter that was also cancelled.

On January 29, 2007, Powter released his first compilation album B-Sides.

=== Post "Bad Day" and hiatus (2008–2011) ===
In March 2008, a song by Japanese singer Haru featuring Powter, "Find My Way", was released. In September, Powter released his third album, Under the Radar. Love you Lately was also rerecorded and released on December 9, 2008 as a new single. This was the same year in which he embarked on the Wolfbaggin' Tour, joining the likes of Alphabeat and Lil Chris.

Powter also performed piano on tracks for what was scheduled to be Marcy Playground frontman John Wozniak's solo album, Leaving Wonderland... in a Fit of Rage, but the album was released under the band's name. Powter was still given credit for his contributions to the song "Gin and Money".

Under The Radar was also given an exclusive CD and DVD release for the Asia Market known as the Asia Tour Edition. It was released on February 14, 2009.

On March 16, 2009, Powter performed at the Montreux Jazz Festival then in December 2009, Powter was named as the decade's top One-Hit Wonder by Billboard. The magazine describes one-hit wonders as acts whose second hit did not reach the top 25; they only included acts from 2000 to 2007. In Powter's case, "Bad Day" is his only Hot 100 hit.

On January 1, 2010, he performed O Canada at the NHL Winter Classic. In that same year, he released his greatest hits album, Best of Me, and with it, recorded three new songs and a new version of the title track to go along with 'Bad Day', 'Jimmy Gets High', 'Next Plane Home' and his other singles. Only one was released as a single: 'Lose To Win', on November 10, 2010.

On December 1, 2010, Powter made a tribute to English singer and songwriter John Lennon with his cover version of Happy Xmas (War Is Over). This single was released in Europe, the UK and Japan.

Powter took a hiatus in 2011 to focus on his family life.

=== Later career (2012–present) ===
On April 10, 2012, Powter's single "Cupid" was released to US and Canadian iTunes stores. The single was written after his divorce. Powter's album, Turn On the Lights, was released in July 2012.

On September 10, 2012, he released "Crazy All My Life". The song peaked at number 23 on the Canadian Hot 100 and became his biggest hit in Russia, where it reached number 12 on the radio chart and has over 1.4 million lifetime plays.

On December 5, 2012, Powter was featured in a song with Japanese singer May J. titled "Back To Your Heart". On the 18 he released the single "Christmas Cupid", which is a Christmas version of his song "Cupid".

On June 5, 2013, Powter announced on Twitter that he was working on an album with Jeff Dawson, who co-produced most of his songs in the past, and John Fields, who was a co-writer on "Crazy All My Life". He also said:

I'm writing like I did during the first record. I'm not focusing on singles. Otherwise I would try too hard and end up with garbage sort of like Bad Day. I never thought in my wildest dreams that it was a single. I think that's what writing from your heart is. Just like anything else. When you try too hard, it really isn't worthy of anything... So I stay open and just let the songs write themselves.

On July 15, 2013, Powter performed at the National Association of Drug Court Professionals performing "Bad Day" and "Whole World Around." Matthew Perry also attended the event.

On August 9, 2013, he performed at the Festival of Friends.

On September 5, 2013, Powter later released 4 songs as bonus tracks for his album Turn on the Lights called Ur My Radio, Doesn't Matter, Cheers To Us and Goodbye. These tracks only appeared as part of a re-release for the Japanese market on March 17, 2014.

On November 27, 2016, Powter performed at The 39th Jazz Goes To Campus Festival performing Bad Day.

On January 6, 2017, Powter released a single called "Delicious" featuring Australian singer Vanessa Amorosi. The music video was uploaded to his official YouTube channel on March 14, 2017.

On December 10, 2017, Powter performed at the President's Star Charity event in Singapore singing Bad Day and joined Sandra Riley Tang in a duet performing her band's song "Save Myself."

On April 6, 2018, Powter released a single called "Perfect For Me." On April 13, he released his fourth extended play known as Daniel Powter. There are 4 songs in this album: a remastered remix of Bad Day, Tell Them Who You Are in an acoustic version, his 2017 single "Delicious" and his 2018 single "Perfect For Me."

On September 21, 2018, Powter released a single known as "Do You Wanna Get Lucky" It was followed by another called "Survivor" released on October 26 and Perfect for Me was later re-recorded and released on November 23 for the Asia market.

He released an album called Giants on December 14 where songs in the album include the re-recording of "Perfect For Me", "Survivor", "Delicious", re-recordings of "Bad Day", "Free Loop" and "Tell Them Who You Are" (from the EP). A remixed version of "Do You Wanna Get Lucky" is also included known as the Holiday version.

Powter went on to feature with The Untamed Boys, a Chinese pop group, in January 2020, where they released the song "Just Isn't Me." and performed it alongside "Bad Day" while touring in Bangkok, Thailand. Powter also collaborated with other artists in the MOSHIMO Project in May 2020.

On February 3, 2021, Powter was featured in a song called "Save Your Life" with Japanese pop singer Ayaka Hirahara.

In 2024, Powter performed "Bad Day" during his audition on the fourth season of Canada's Got Talent, making his first Canadian television performance.

In August 2025, Powter announced on Instagram that his new song "City of Angels" will be released on September 12, 2025. Following this, he released a new song on October 17, 2025 called "Celebrate the Holidays." It is Powter's first ever original holiday song.

== Personal life ==
Powter moved to Los Angeles in 2005. As of 2024, Powter resides with his wife Christina in Portland, Oregon. He has three children: two daughters and one son.

Powter disclosed in July 2013 that he was sexually abused by a female babysitter for three years starting from the age of seven and turned to drugs and alcohol to get over his guilt and shame. He said in an interview:

I thought that (addiction) was my problem. But it wasn't. That was my solution. It wasn't until I started digging in, taking a look at myself, saying I gotta work on some stuff (that) I don't want to look at (that I figured it out). My parents didn't know and I was too scared to tell them.

Powter was addicted to alcohol and cocaine. He became sober in 2010.

Powter is a fan of the NHL. As a child, he was a fan of the Edmonton Oilers and is now a Los Angeles Kings fan.

== Musical influences ==
Powter spoken of his musical influences growing up:

My favourite is Nick Drake. I still absolutely adore his music. You know it's still old band music inspired by Elton John's old stuff, you know the Beatles and Fleetwood Mac and David Bowie and the things that my parents gave me when I was a kid. I still listen to those records, because I think for me, what it is that I relate to, is how the structure of the songs are for them, you know, like verses, and choruses, and bridges. And so sometimes the modern music that I hear these days doesn't really have that and I don't relate to it. So I still listen to the old stuff.

== Awards and nominations ==
Year	Awards	Work	Category	Result
2005	MTV Europe Music Awards	Himself	Best New Act	Nominated
2005	Žebřík Music Awards	Himself	Best International Male	Nominated
2005	Žebřík Music Awards	Himself	Best International Surprise	Nominated
2005	Žebřík Music Awards	"Bad Day"	Best International Song	Nominated
2005	Žebřík Music Awards	"Bad Day"	Best International Video	Nominated
2005	The Record of the Year	"Bad Day"	Record of the Year	Nominated
2005	SOCAN Awards	"Bad Day"	Best Pop Song	Won
2006	Tokio Hot 100 Awards	"Bad Day"	Best Song	Won
2006	BMI Pop Awards	"Bad Day"	Pop Award	Won
2006	Billboard Music Awards	"Bad Day"	Top Hot 100 Song	Won
2006	Billboard Music Awards	"Bad Day"	Digital Song of the Year	Won
2006	Billboard Music Awards	"Bad Day"	Pop 100 Song of the Year	Nominated
2006	APRA Music Awards	"Bad Day"	Most Performed Foreign Work	Nominated
2006	MuchMusic Video Awards	"Bad Day"	MuchMoreMusic Award	Nominated
2006	Teen Choice Awards	Himself	Choice Music: Breakout Artist - Male	Nominated
2006	Canadian Radio Music Awards	Himself	Best New Group or Solo Artist—Mainstream AC	Won
2006	Juno Awards	Himself	New Artist of the Year	Won
2006	Brit Awards	Himself	International Breakthrough Act	Nominated
2007	Grammy Awards	"Bad Day"	Best Male Pop Vocal Performance	Nominated
2007	Kids' Choice Awards	"Bad Day"	Favorite Song	Nominated
2007	Groovevolt Music & Fashion Awards	"Bad Day"	Best Pop Song Performance - Male	Nominated
2007	MTV Video Music Awards Japan	"Bad Day"	Best Male Video	Nominated
2007	MTV Video Music Awards Japan	Daniel Powter	Album of the Year	Won
2007	Japan Gold Disc Awards	Daniel Powter	Best 3 Albums	Won
2007	Japan Gold Disc Awards	Himself	New Artist of the Year	Won
2007	Japan Gold Disc Awards	Himself	International Artist of the Year	Won
2007	Japan Gold Disc Awards	"Bad Day"	International Song of the Year	Won
2008	Tokio Hot 100 Awards	Himself	Best Male Artist	Nominated
2009	RTHK International Pop Poll Awards	Himself	Top Male Artist	Bronze
2009	RTHK International Pop Poll Awards	"Next Plane Home"	Top Ten International Gold Songs	Nominated

== Discography ==
=== Studio albums ===
List of studio albums, with selected chart positions, sales figures and certifications
Title	Album details	Peak chart positions										Sales	Certifications
Title	Album details	AUS	AUT	BEL (WA)	FRA	IRL	JPN	NZ	SWI	UK	US	Sales	Certifications
I'm Your Betty	Released: June 21, 2000; Label: Outside; Formats: CD	—	—	—	—	—	—	—	—	—	—		
Daniel Powter	Released: August 8, 2005; Label: Warner Bros.; Formats: CD, digital download	14	43	18	14	8	4	6	14	5	9	US: 500,000	ARIA: Gold; BPI: Platinum; IFPI SWI: Gold; IRMA: Platinum; RIAA: Gold; RIAJ: 3× Platinum; RMNZ: Gold; SNEP: Platinum
Under the Radar	Released: September 15, 2008; Label: Warner Bros.; Formats: CD, digital download	—	74	21	29	—	10	—	20	43	—		
Turn On the Lights	Released: July 13, 2012; Label: Avex, EMI; Formats: CD, digital download	—	—	—	—	—	177	—	—	109	—		
Giants	Released: December 14, 2018; Label: KDS Farrell, Inc; Formats: CD, digital download	—	—	—	—	—	—	—	—	—	—		
"—" denotes a recording that did not chart or was not released in that territory.

=== Compilation albums ===
List of compilation albums, with selected chart positions
Title	Album details	Peak chart positions
Title	Album details	JPN
B-Sides	Released: January 29, 2007; Label: Warner Bros.; Formats: Digital download	—
Best of Me	Released: December 8, 2010; Label: Warner Bros.; Formats: CD, digital download	65
The Essential Collection	Released: November 19, 2021; Label: Warner Bros.; Formats: Digital download	—
"—" denotes a recording that did not chart or was not released in that territory.

=== Extended plays ===
List of extended plays
Title	EP details
Free Loop	Released: May 31, 2005; Label: Warner Bros.; Formats: Digital download
iTunes Live from Tokyo	Released: August 6, 2008; Label: Warner Bros.; Formats: Digital download
Songs from Under the Radar	Released: September 16, 2008; Label: Warner Bros.; Formats: Digital download
Daniel Powter	Released: April 13, 2018; Label: Unleashed; Formats: Digital download

=== Singles ===
==== As lead artist ====
List of singles, with selected chart positions and certifications, showing year released and album name
Title	Year	Peak chart positions										Certifications	Album
Title	Year	CAN	AUS	BEL	GER	IRL	JPN	SWI	UK	US	US Adult	Certifications	Album
"Bad Day"	2005	7	3	5	17	1	95 (Note: Charted in May 2008, after the 2008 establishment of the Japan Hot 100.)	5	2	1	1	MC: Platinum; ARIA: Platinum; BPI: 2× Platinum; BVMI: Gold; RIAA: 3× Platinum; RIAJ: 2× Platinum	Daniel Powter
"Free Loop (One Night Stand)"	2005	11	43	60	55	20	×	38	—	—	—		Daniel Powter
"Jimmy Gets High"	2005	—	—	46	—	—	×	41	—	—	—		Daniel Powter
"Lie to Me"	2006	—	—	—	—	—	×	—	92	—	—		Daniel Powter
"Love You Lately"	2006	45	—	—	—	—	×	—	—	—	39		Daniel Powter
"Next Plane Home"	2008	—	—	25	71	—	8	37	70	—	—		Under the Radar
"Best of Me"	2008	—	—	—	—	—	23	40	—	—	—		Under the Radar
"Whole World Around"	2008	—	—	—	—	—	—	—	—	—	—		Under the Radar
"Lose to Win"	2010	—	—	—	—	—	17	—	—	—	—		Best of Me
"Happy Xmas (War Is Over)"	2010	—	—	—	—	—	—	—	—	—	—		Best of Me
"Cupid"	2012	—	—	—	—	—	12	—	195	—	36		Turn on the Lights
"Crazy All My Life"	2012	23	—	—	—	—	—	—	—	—	—		Turn on the Lights
"Delicious"	2017	—	—	—	—	—	—	—	—	—	—		Giants
"Perfect for Me"	2018	—	—	—	—	—	—	—	—	—	—		Giants
"Do You Wanna Get Lucky"	2018	—	—	—	—	—	—	—	—	—	—		Giants
"Survivor"	2018	—	—	—	—	—	—	—	—	—	—		Giants
"Brave"	2021	—	—	—	—	—	—	—	—	—	—		Non-album single
"Bad Day (Stripped Down)"	2024	—	—	—	—	—	—	—	—	—	—		Non-album single
"City of Angels"	2025	—	—	—	—	—	—	—	—	—	—		Non-album single
"Celebrate the Holidays"	2025	—	—	—	—	—	—	—	—	—	—		Non-album single
Free Loop (Stripped Down)	2026	—	—	—	—	—	—	—	—	—	—		Non-album single
"—" denotes a recording that did not chart or was not released in that territory. "×" denotes periods where charts did not exist or were not archived.

==== As featured artist ====
List of singles, with selected chart positions
Title	Year	Peak chart positions		Album
Title	Year	JPN Oricon	JPN Hot	Album
"Find My Way" (Haru x Daniel Powter)	2008	59	14	Non-album single
"Save Your Life" (Ayaka Hirahara featuring Daniel Powter)	2021	—	—	Save Your Life: Ayaka Hirahara All Time Live Best
"Brave" (Patricia Kelly x Daniel Powter)	2021	—	—	Unbreakable
"—" denotes items that did not chart.

==== Promotional singles ====
List of singles, with selected chart positions
Title	Year	Peak chart positions	Album
Title	Year	JPN Hot	Album
"Back to Your Heart" (May J. featuring Daniel Powter)	2012	—	Brave
"Cheers to Us" (Triplane featuring Daniel Powter & Shintarō Tokita (Sukima Switch))	2013	78	Singles 04-12
"Just Isn't Me" (心之所向的美丽 Xīn zhī suǒ xiàng dì měilì) (T.U.B.S. featuring Daniel Powter)	2021	—	Love: One-Act
"—" denotes items that did not chart.

== Music videos ==
Year	Music video	Director(s)	Notes
2005	"Bad Day"	Marc Webb	Samaire Armstrong and Jason Adelman are featured in the video
2005	"Free Loop (One Night Stand)"	Marc Webb	Filmed at the Millennium Biltmore Hotel in Los Angeles
2005	"Jimmy Gets High"	Vem	
2006	"Lie to Me"	Marc Webb	
2006	"Love You Lately"	Philip Andelman	Rachael Leigh Cook and Brian Hallisay are featured in the video.
2008	"Next Plane Home"	Markku Lahdesmaki	Powter's daughter Sophie is featured in the video. Filmed in Lancaster, California
2008	"Best of Me"	Diane Martel	
2010	"Lose to Win"	Rohit Karn Batra	
2012	"Cupid"	Neil Tardio	Filmed in Malibu, California.
2013	"Crazy All My Life"		
2017	"Delicious"		
2018	"Perfect for Me"		
2018	"Do You Wanna Get Lucky"	Joe Murray	Filmed at The Village in Santa Monica
2018	"Survivor"	Joe Murray	Chinese singer Kelly Yu sings with him in a duet
2024	"Bad Day (Stripped Down)"		Vocals used are from his previous re-recordings from the album Giants.
2026	"Free Loop (Stripped Down)"		Vocals used are from his previous re-recordings from the album Giants.

=== Music covers ===
Year	Title	Original artist
2007	"Just Like Heaven"	the Cure
2010	"Happy Xmas (War Is Over)"	John Lennon
2012	"Stay Away"	L'Arc-en-Ciel
