= Cupid (Daniel Powter song) =

2012 single by Daniel Powter

Single by Daniel Powter

from the album Turn on the Lights
- Released: 10 April 2012
- Recorded: 2011
- Genre: Pop rock
- Length: 3:43
- Label: AVEX
- Songwriters: Kevin Griffin, Daniel Powter
- Producer: Warren Huart Kevin Griffin

Daniel Powter singles chronology
"Happy Xmas (War Is Over)" (2010)	"Cupid" (2012)	"Crazy All My Life" (2012)

"Cupid" (also known in Japan as "Koi no Cupid" (恋のキューピッド; Love Cupid)) is a song by Canadian recording artist Daniel Powter from his fourth studio album Turn on the Lights (2012). It was released as a digital download on 10 April 2012 as the lead single from the album. The song charted at number 38 on the Billboard Adult Pop Songs chart.

== Background ==
Powter stated the inspiration and meaning for writing the song "Cupid" was when he was walking with his dog in a park one day and saw an elderly couple hugging and dancing with each other. He also added:

I thought to myself: 'Oh my god. That is so amazing.' So I went back home and started writing all of these lyrics about: It doesn't matter if you're yin, doesn't matter if you're the yang. It's just that, the only thing that matters is that you love each other. So Cupid is trying to capture that moment where we're very different but we still love each other.

He also said in an interview with Getty Images:

Cupid is a song that I wrote to kind of have that, you know, it's supposed to sort of represent that giddy first part of the relationship and then it's supposed to take you through the years — into the golden years — where a couple stays together and that sort of romanticizes the ideal relationship. I wanted to chronologically show people that you can love each other no matter what.

== Formats and track listings ==
- Digital Download
1. Cupid - 3:44
- UK Promo CD
1. Cupid - 3:44

== Music video ==
A music video to accompany the release of "Cupid" was first released onto YouTube on 29 May 2012 at a total length of three minutes and fifty-three seconds. The video was directed by Neil Tardio and depicts the story of a couple, a man and a woman, and the stages in the life of their relationship (From the start where they are young adults and playful, to when they have children and at the end when they have a large family). Powter appears singing on the beach, outside their house and also near the end of the video where he 'gives away' the woman at the renewing of her wedding vows with the man. The video ends with the lovers walking on the beach with their many family relatives. The music video was shot in Malibu, California.

== Track listing ==
Digital download
No.	Title	Length
1.	"Cupid"	3:43

== Christmas Cupid ==
Powter's single "Cupid" in a Christmas themed version.

"Christmas Cupid"

Single by Daniel Powter
- Released: 18 December 2012
- Recorded: 2012
- Genre: Pop rock
- Length: 4:03
- Label: AVEX
- Songwriters: Kevin Griffin, Daniel Powter

== Chart performance ==
Chart (2012)	Peak position
Canada AC (Billboard)	7
Japan (Japan Hot 100)	12
UK Singles (Official Charts Company)	195
US Adult Pop Songs (Billboard)	36

== Release history ==
Region	Date	Format	Label
Canada	April 10, 2012	Digital download	AVEX
