= Natalia Lesz =

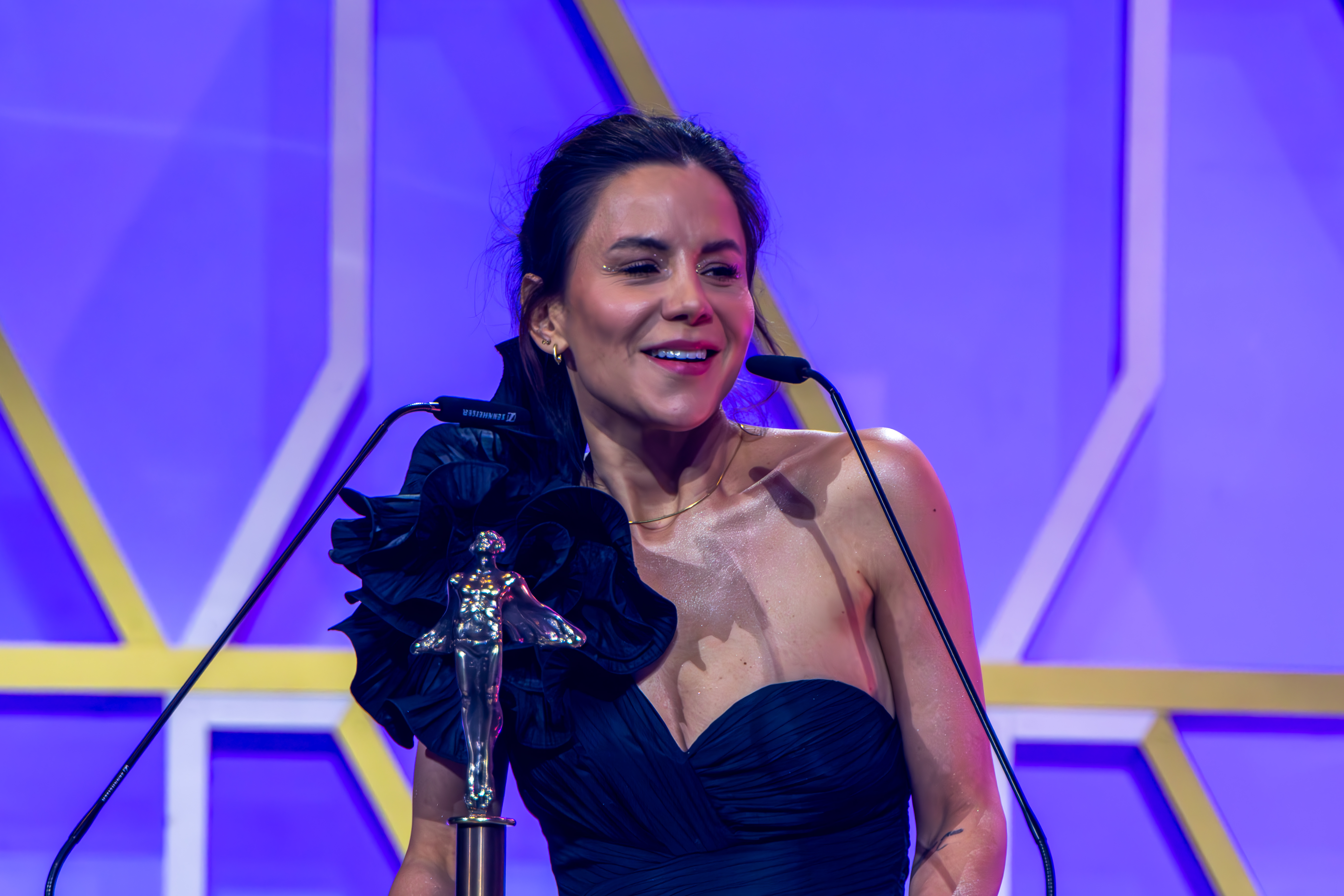
- Natalia Lesz, 2024

Background information
- Also known as: Natalia
- Born: Natalia Lesz; 27 July 1981 (age 45); Warsaw, Poland
- Genres: Pop, Adult Contemporary, Electronica
- Occupations: Singer, songwriter, actress
- Years active: 2008–present
- Labels: EMI Music Poland, Unleashed Music
- Website: nataliamusic.com

Natalia Lesz (born 27 July 1981 in Warsaw, Poland) is a Polish actress, a pop singer and songwriter.

== Background ==
Lesz is a graduate of the renowned acting department at the Tisch School of the Arts, New York University (NYU). While in New York City, she performed in plays both on and off Broadway. While living in New York, Natalia also immersed herself in studies at CAP21, The Stella Adler Conservatory of Acting and The Lee Strasberg Institute.

Natalia has starred in numerous Polish television shows and TV series. When a teenager, she went to the National Warsaw Ballet School and performed as a soloist at the Polish National Opera. After graduating from New York University, she recorded her debut album, Natalia Lesz, produced by hit makers Greg Wells and Glen Ballard.

Natalia has already performed on major stages in the US and Europe, including an opening spot for British pop star Mika; Patricia Kass as well as for Celine Dion as a part of her current "Taking Chances" world tour. Her single "Power Of Attraction" remix reached No. 24 in the Billboard music charts. Her latest record "That Girl" was released in Poland and just after 2 months reached a gold status. Natalia has featured on Polish Dancing with the Stars and placed 2nd with the highest score in history of the show. Natalia has also become a face of a campaign, promoting Georgia in Poland and has received an honorary citizenship by the President of the country- Mikheil Saakashvili for her efforts to raise awareness and tourism of Georgia in Poland.

In January 2009, Natalia was nominated by the POPCORN magazine, as "The Best Polish Singer of The Year". In February, she was nominated by the BRAVO magazine in a "Fresh Blood" category. In the same month, she was also nominated by the members of the recording industry for the prestigious "Fryderyki", the Polish music awards. In March, Natalia had been nominated by the polish-edition Glamour magazine, in "The Most Glamorous Debut of The Year" category. Natalia has featured on Polish Dancing with the Stars and placed 2nd with the highest score in history of the show. In the new TV series on TVP, Tancerze (Eng. The Dancers), which first aired on 3 April 2009, she plays one of the leading roles as "Inga". In May 2010, Natalia won a "Press and Media Award" at Top Trendy Festival in Sopot.

In 2011 she released her second studio album That Girl, which was promoted by the single with the same title. It smashed Polish radio stations and became one of the biggest hit of 2011 in Poland and gained some airplay in USA. The album, itself, received mostly favorable reviews from critics. Natalia has been praised for good vocals, lyrics and the whole production. The album was certified gold (over 15,000 copies sold). In 2012 Natalia released the second single from her second album, "Beat of My Heart". The song received good reviews from critics and Natalia has been compared to Kylie Minogue. The clip aired on HBO Plus and Logo TV in the US.

== Discography ==
=== Studio albums ===
Title	Album details	Peak chart positions	Sales	Certifications
Title	Album details	POL	Sales	Certifications
Natalia Lesz	Released: 14 April 2008; Label: EMI Music Poland; Formats: CD, digital download	13		
That Girl	Released: 17 October 2011; Label: EMI Music Poland; Formats: CD, digital download	44	POL: 15,000+	POL: Gold

=== Singles ===
Title	Year	Peak chart positions		Album
Title	Year	POL New	US Dance	Album
"Fall"	2008	—	—	Natalia Lesz
"Power of Attraction"	2008	—	24	Natalia Lesz
"Coś za coś"	2009	—	—	That Girl
"RadioActive"	2010	—	—	Non-album single
"That Girl"	2011	4	—	That Girl
"Chciałabym"	2012	—	—	Non-album single
"Batumi"	2012	—	—	Non-album single
"Sorry D"	2012	—	—	That Girl
"—" denotes a recording that did not chart or was not released in that territory.
