= Love You Lately =

Single by Daniel Powter

from the album Daniel Powter
- Released: September 19, 2006
- Recorded: 2005
- Genre: Indie pop
- Label: Warner Bros.
- Songwriter: Daniel Powter
- Producer: Daniel Powter

Daniel Powter singles chronology
"Lie to Me" (2006)	"Love You Lately" (2006)	"Next Plane Home" (2008)

Music video
- "Love You Lately" on Dailymotion

"Love You Lately" is the fifth single from Daniel Powter's eponymous second studio album, Daniel Powter. It is also the only additional track to appear on the CD of the 2006 deluxe edition/re-release which also included a DVD with all of the music videos accompanying the preceding four singles ('Bad Day', 'Free Loop (One Night Stand)', 'Jimmy Gets High' and 'Lie To Me'), a selection of live versions of songs on the album filmed in concert at 'Studio A' and a selection of B Sides. The deluxe edition, 'Love You Lately' and Powter's compilation album 'B Sides' all share the same sleeve artwork. 'Love You Lately' is also a bonus track on the Japanese Promo release of Powter's third studio album "Under the Radar".

== Formats and track listings ==
- MP3 Download
1. "Love You Lately"
- Japanese 1 Track CD
1. "Love You Lately" (Album Version)
- Japanese Promo CD
1. "Love You Lately" (Album Version) - 2:58
2. "Love You Lately" (Live in Tokyo) - 3:14

== Music video ==
The music video to "Love You Lately" is available on Powter's website and YouTube on the Warner Bros. Records channel. The plot is about a girl (played by Rachael Leigh Cook), from the country-side who moves to the city, seeking a job and possibly a better life. Yet, in doing so, she leaves behind her boyfriend, whom she cannot forget. While in the city, she works as a studio assistant on the set of Powter's music video for the song, running errands like purchasing coffee. She becomes disillusioned with her job and feels lost, out of place in the strange new world. Both she and her boyfriend (played by Brian Hallisay) cannot seem to come to terms with their parting, continually looking at past photos and recollecting the beautiful memories of the times shared together. At the end of the video, she decides to pick up the phone to call her boyfriend, who already seems to have anticipated her call. The video ends with Powter alone at his piano and a studio light being left on, tribute to the song's lyrics: 'Cause there's a thousand lights that'll make you feel brand new, but if you ever lose your way, I'll leave one on for you."

== Remix ==
Love You Lately was later remixed as a bonus track for Powter's third studio album "Under the Radar". The remix contains a cleaner sound, extra keyboard/synthesizer effects, and some extra backing vocals. It was also re-released as a promo single in the US.

== Charts ==
Chart (2007)	Peak position
Canada Hot 100 (Billboard)	45
Canada AC (Billboard)	3
Canada Hot AC (Billboard)	8
US Adult Pop Airplay (Billboard)	39

== Release history ==
Release dates and formats for "Love You Lately"
Region	Date	Format	Label(s)	Ref.
United States	October 16, 2006	Mainstream airplay	Warner Bros.	
