= Jimmy Gets High =

Single by Daniel Powter

from the album Daniel Powter
- Released: August 19, 2005; August 21, 2006 (Jimmy)
- Recorded: 2005
- Genre: Indie pop
- Length: 3:40
- Label: Warner Bros.
- Songwriter: Daniel Powter
- Producer: Daniel Powter

Daniel Powter singles chronology
| "Free Loop" (2005) | "Jimmy Gets High" (2005) | "Lie to Me" (2006) |

"Jimmy Gets High" is a song written and recorded by Canadian artist Daniel Powter. It was released in August 2005 as the third single from his self-titled second album. It followed the single "Free Loop", from the same album. The album sold 500,000 copies, but "Jimmy Gets High" did not fare as well, not charting in the US but charting in Canada. On some sleeve designs of the song, including the UK Promo release, was renamed 'Jimmy' and released on August 21, 2006.

== Formats and track listings ==
- UK CD DMD Maxi Single
1. "Jimmy Gets High"
2. "Song 6" (Live in Vienna)
3. "Bad Day" (Live in Vienna)
- European 2 Track CD
1. "Jimmy Gets High"
2. "Song 6" (Live in Vienna)
- UK Promo CD
1. "Jimmy"
- European Promo CD
1. "Jimmy Gets High" (Radio Edit)
- Japanese Promo CD
1. "Jimmy Gets High" (Album Version)
- MP3 Download
1. "Jimmy Gets High" (Album Version)
2. "Bad Day" (Acoustic Version recorded for NRJ)

== Music video ==
Powter is shown at a party where people are romantically experimenting with each other, enjoying themselves or completely passed out. The video also contains random shots of guests while Powter appears, from the start, sitting, later he is standing in random areas of the party and also walking around while alone and singing directly to the camera. Although, as the video begins approaching the end, Powter is shown performing on a white grand piano with a drummer backing him up as he entertains the others.

== Charts ==
| Chart (2005) | Peak position |
|---|---|
| Belgium (Ultratop 50 Flanders) | 46 |
| Belgium (Ultratip Bubbling Under Wallonia) | 3 |
| Canada Hot AC (Billboard) | 15 |
| Netherlands (Dutch Top 40) | 36 |
| Sweden (Sverigetopplistan) | 58 |
| Switzerland (Schweizer Hitparade) | 41 |
