= Bad Day (Daniel Powter song) =

2005 single by Daniel Powter

Single by Daniel Powter

from the album Daniel Powter
- B-side: "Stupid Like This"; "Lost on the Stoop"
- Released: January 9, 2005 (Note: The exact date can not be determined precisely but Billboard indicates that the song went to French radio after a 2004 Christmas advertisement "paved the way" to its release in "early 2005". The Vernon Morning Star gives January 9, 2005, as its release date, although it does not specify the medium.)
- Recorded: 2002–2004
- Studio: Area A (Los Angeles, CA); Mushroom Studios (Vancouver, BC)
- Genre: Pop; pop rock; alternative rock
- Length: 3:55
- Label: Warner Bros.
- Songwriter: Daniel Powter
- Producers: Mitchell Froom; Jeff Dawson

Daniel Powter singles chronology
"Bad Day" (2005)	"Free Loop" (2005)

Audio sample
- file; help

"Bad Day" is a pop song by Canadian singer-songwriter Daniel Powter from his self-titled second studio album (2005). It was written by Powter and produced by Jeff Dawson and Mitchell Froom. Powter and Dawson recorded the song in 2002, but were initially unable to find a record label to release it. The song was first used in a French Coca-Cola television advertisement in Christmas 2004 before its official release. Tom Whalley, Warner Bros. Records' chairman and CEO, offered Powter a contract after hearing a demo tape of it. The track ended up being released as the aforementioned album's lead single in Europe in early 2005.

The song was received with a generally mixed reception from critics. While some praised its lyrics for their "universal appeal", others felt they were too broad. Despite this, it was a commercial success. In 2005, the single charted in the top five in more than ten countries worldwide and became the most played song on European radio. After its European success, it was released in the United States where it topped the Billboard Hot 100, Pop 100, Adult Top 40, and Adult Contemporary charts. In 2006, it became the first song ever to sell two million digital copies in the United States, as well as being measured by Billboard as the most popular song of the year inside of the United States, and the first under its new system. After another million were sold, it was certified three-times platinum by the Recording Industry Association of America (RIAA) in 2009. It was certified double platinum in the United Kingdom, platinum in Australia and Canada, and gold in Denmark and Germany.

The accompanying music video for "Bad Day" was directed by Marc Webb and became the eighth most-watched music video on the Internet in 2006, reaching 9.8 million views one year after its release. The video depicts two downcast people sharing a similar routine until they meet each other at the end of the video. The song was used for advertisements and television programs, most prominently as American Idol's elimination song. Different shows and artists covered and parodied "Bad Day", including Saturday Night Live and Alvin and the Chipmunks. Powter has also performed the song on television shows including The Tonight Show with Jay Leno and The Ellen DeGeneres Show, and during his concert tours in North America and Europe. The song's success made it Powter's "anthem" and would be included on his later compilation albums B-Sides (2007) and Best of Me (2010).

== Background and release ==
After leaving MacEwan University in Edmonton at 20, Powter moved to Vancouver, British Columbia where he played keyboards before he started composing songs. In 1997, he partnered with music producer Jeff Dawson; they recorded "Bad Day" in 2002. For two weeks, Powter had a melody that "wouldn't go away" from his mind. Thinking of a lyric that would fit the melody, he thought an "up and poppy" lyric would make it "the cheesiest song of all time". He then thought "bad day" would be a good choice for the chorus, and wrote the lyrics partly based on his life as "a struggling musician". It was the last song to be composed for his album, with Powter writing it in an hour during a ferry journey between Victoria and Vancouver. Powter said it was not a lyrically elaborate song, but that: "mostly it's about phonics. It's about words that sing great. I was mumbling something, and those words came out."

Dawson and Powter included the song on a disc that was offered to record labels that asked Powter to audition in New York, but his lack of stage presence led to the labels turning him down. Disappointed, he returned to Vancouver to move on because: "once a record company says no, it's difficult to come around again". After this failure, his new representative, Gary Stamler, played a demo tape for Tom Whalley, chairman and CEO of Warner Bros. Records. Whalley offered Powter a contract but he was reluctant to sign it because he considered himself primarily a songwriter. He accepted the offer in April 2003 and, along with Dawson and producer Mitchell Froom, worked on his album and the song in Los Angeles, California. The album was originally recorded in Powter's Vancouver apartment but Warner Bros. asked that it be rerecorded. However, because Froom wanted to keep its "original feel[ing]", in Powter's words it was just "touch[ed] up".

"Bad Day" was first released to three French radio stations—RTL, NRJ, and Europe 2—in early 2005. On February 8, Barnes & Noble released it on an exclusive extended play (EP), which also contained "Free Loop", "Lie to Me", and "Song 6". In the United States it was digitally released on February 22, 2005. In 2005, Warner Bros. Records released it as a CD single in Switzerland on March 4, in France on March 22, in Italy on May 18, in Germany on May 30, in Australia on June 27, in the United Kingdom on July 25, and in Canada on July 28. The Swiss and Canadian release also included "Stupid Like This", a non-album track, while the Italian, German, and Australian versions included "Stupid Like This" and "Lost on The Stoop". In France and the United Kingdom, both versions were released, and the British release also contained the music video for "Bad Day". A live-recorded version for Austrian radio station Hitradio Ö3 was included on the 2005 EP Free Loop. On August 6, 2008, an EP live from Tokyo was released exclusively on iTunes and it included "Song 6", "Free Loop", "Best of Me", "Love You Lately" and "Bad Day". "Bad Day" was also included on Powter's compilation albums B-Sides (2007) and Best of Me (2010).

== Composition ==
Bitching and griping about nothing. My granddad used to say to me, 'There's better people who are worse off than you,' and I always remember that. It's a song about trying to make people feel better. I'm making fun of you, but at the same time making fun of myself.

— Daniel Powter

"Bad Day" is a midtempo pop power ballad, performed in a moderate groove and accompanied by a piano. The song is composed in the key of E♭ major (with the bridge in F♯ major), and uses syncopated 16th-note rhythms. According to the sheet music published at Musicnotes.com by Warner Bros., Powter's vocals range from the note of E♭_{3} and D♭_{5}. Its instrumentation differs from "the scores of adolescent thrust-rockers" and includes, as Powter referred to it, "aggressive" drums. David Browne of Entertainment Weekly said it is: "addressed to anyone who's feeling depressed ... but [in contrast] its grand, panoramic arrangement wants to pump you up". Simon Donohue of the Manchester Evening News commented its sound "seagues [sic] from boy band banality to Foo Fighters-style raucous rock". According to Winston Kung of PopMatters, it is "in tune with the zeitgeist".

The lyrics of "Bad Day" were said to have a universal appeal by Alan Connor of BBC News Magazine as they have an "everyman breeziness" because the song's subject can be any person going through a bad daytime. Stephen Thomas Erlewine from AllMusic described it as: "a loping, sunny tune that pretty much has the opposite sentiment of its title". Although About.com's Bill Lamb described its lyrics as having a "reassuring, comforting" tone, Powter said the song "mak[es] fun of self-absorbed and narcissistic people who bitch and gripe". He also affirmed: "It's not literally about having a bad day, it's more about not taking yourself too seriously and complaining about trivial things".

== Critical reception ==
The song received mixed reviews by commentators; some reviewers praised it for its composition, while other critics felt that the lyrics were not profound. Billboard's Chuck Taylor called the song "instantly memorable" and praised its instrumentation for being different "from the scores of adolescent thrust-rockers currently dominating the scene." Dubbing it "elegant, timeless pop/rock", Taylor qualified it as "one of the great discoveries of the year", while Pete Waterman, writing for The Guardian in 2007, stated it was "one of [his] favourite songs of recent years". Eric R. Danton from the Hartford Courant classified it as the best track on the album, while Erlewine called it "the template for the rest of his debut". In contrast, Wilson Kung said the song "pales in comparison to some of the truly strong songs" on the album Daniel Powter. Alan Connor of BBC News Magazine said it is a typical sentimental song but that in "Bad Day"'s case "there's even less detail". He said the song "is so low on the specifics, there are some couplets that feel like they've been translated from a foreign language, possibly by a computer". A writer for The Daily Edge called it "a song so sweet it gave you a toothache", while a reviewer from The Scotsman called it a "horrible song". Bill Lamb said it "feels genuine" but "if you are looking for depth, this is not your song", Chris Lee of the Los Angeles Times said the song is "baleful but soulful", and People commented: "'Bad Day' may be catchy enough to overcome its trite lyrics".

=== Accolades ===
"Bad Day" won an award from the Society of Composers, Authors and Music Publishers of Canada as one of six Canadian pop songs with the most radio airplay in 2005. In 2006, it won the Tokio Hot 100 Award for Best Song, and guaranteed Powter the Canadian Radio Music Award for Best New Group or Solo Artist—Mainstream AC. In the following year, the song won a BMI Pop Award, and shared the 2007 Japan Gold Disc Award for the most-downloaded international song with "You Raise Me Up" by Celtic Woman and "Dani California" by Red Hot Chili Peppers. The song was nominated for Pop 100 Single of the Year at the 2006 Billboard Music Awards losing to Nelly Furtado's "Promiscuous". At the APRA Music Awards of 2006, it was nominated for Most Performed Foreign Work but lost to Rob Thomas's "Lonely No More". In 2007, it was nominated for Best Male Pop Vocal Performance at the 49th Annual Grammy Awards but John Mayer's performance on "Waiting on the World to Change" won him the award. It received a nomination for Best Song at the 2007 Kids' Choice Awards but lost to Beyoncé's "Irreplaceable".

== Chart performance ==
"Bad Day" topped Nielsen Music Control's Pan European Airplay 100 as the most played song on European radio stations in 2005. It was also the third most downloaded song that year in Europe. On Billboard's European Hot 100 Singles it peaked at number two on the weekly chart, while it placed seventh on its year-end chart. The song debuted on the UK Singles Chart issue dated August 6, 2005, at number two, its peak position, spending 38 weeks on the chart. "Bad Day" was the eleventh best-selling single and the third most downloaded song in the UK in 2005. It was the most played song on UK radio during the period 2003–08. In November 2023, it was certified double platinum by the British Phonographic Industry. The song debuted on the Irish Singles Chart at number 13 on July 28, 2005, and topped it for three weeks, spending 19 weeks on the chart. The song peaked at number three on the French Singles Chart, and was the most played song on French radio in 2005. It was the most played song on the German Airplay Chart in 2005. It sold 143,600 copies and was certified silver in France, and in Germany it was certified gold for the shipment of over 150,000 copies. It peaked at number one in the Czech Republic, at number three in Italy, at number 5 in Denmark, and reached the top 10 on the singles chart in eight other European territories.

"Bad Day" debuted at number 55 on the US Billboard Hot 100 chart issue dated February 25, 2006. On March 30, 2006, it reached the top spot on the chart. A week before, the song had reached the top of the Hot Digital Songs chart. In the following weeks, it reached number one on the Pop 100 and the Adult Top 40. It topped the Adult Top 40 for 12 weeks, the longest period a song by a lead male artist had spent on the chart. It remained at number one on the Adult Contemporary chart for 19 weeks, making it the song that spent the most time on the Adult Contemporary chart that year, tying Phil Collins' "You'll Be in My Heart" as the longest-running number-one song by a solo male artist to that date. "Bad Day" became the first song to sell two million digital copies in the United States in December 2006, and was the best-selling "digital track" and "digital song" for 2006. "Bad Day" received a three-times platinum certification from the Recording Industry Association of America (RIAA) for digital sales of over 3 million in September 2009. It was the seventh most played song on the American radio in 2006, and was the number one song of 2006 on the Billboard Hot 100 chart. It also performed well on other year-end charts, ranking second on Hot Adult Pop Songs, and third on Hot Adult Contemporary Songs. Media considered its exposure on American Idol as a major factor in its success in the United States.

In Canada, the song was certified platinum by the Canadian Recording Industry Association for the sale 20,000 downloads. "Bad Day" peaked at number seven on the Canadian Singles Chart and at number six on the Hot Canadian Digital Singles chart. In Japan, a ringtone version was certified by the Recording Industry Association of Japan (RIAJ) for shipment of over one million copies. Its full-length ringtone version was certified platinum for shipment of over 250,000 copies, while its single track version was certified double platinum for shipment of over 500,000 copies. "Bad Day" was certified platinum by the Australian Recording Industry Association (ARIA) for shipment of over 70,000 copies. The song debuted at number 21 on the ARIA Charts issue dated July 4, 2005, peaked at number three on the issue dated August 15, 2005, and spent 20 weeks on the chart. It was the 18th top single of 2005 in the year-end ARIA Charts, and was the second most-played song in the country in 2006. It peaked at number 7 in New Zealand appearing for 23 weeks, and was on Venezuela's Pop Rock chart for 19.

== Music video ==
In this scene, the woman (Samaire Armstrong) is completing a heart on a billboard. In the past scenes, she was using a black marker to deface it with negativeness, while the man (Jason Adelman) used a red one to give it a positive tone.

The music video was directed by Marc Webb and premiered on Yahoo!'s website in early 2005. (Note: The precise date could not be found, but the earliest archive available through Wayback Machine for Yahoo's Daniel Powter page is dated April 25, 2005. On this date, the music video for "Bad Day" was already accessible.) As of August 2005, it had been streamed over a million times. It was released on VH1.com on April 28, 2005, and at the iTunes Store for digital download on December 13, 2005. It debuted on television channel VH1 on January 23 of the following year, reaching the Top 20 Countdown for two weeks in March. It was subsequently put on heavy rotation in April 2006, when it was played more than 50 times a week, reduced to 30 weekly airings in May. The video was the eighth most-watched music video on the Internet, with over 9.8 million views in 2006. Warner Bros. Records released the video on YouTube on October 26, 2009. As of February 2023, the video has over 231 million views.

The music video accompanying "Bad Day" features a man (Jason Adelman) and a woman (Samaire Armstrong) going about their daily routines over a three-day period. Parts of the video are shown in split screen as they do exactly the same thing at different times, sometimes in the same location. The central point of the video occurs when they paint separately on the same billboard, which originally featured a woman sitting on a bench. Armstrong's character shows her negativeness by adding rain and a taxi spraying water at the woman, while Adelman adds an umbrella and a man with a coat to cover the woman. At some point, he draws a question mark and she completes it with a heart. At the end of the video, they finally meet when the man offers the woman an umbrella during a rain shower as a taxi cab stops for them. Throughout the video, Powter is shown playing piano on Pershing Square in downtown Los Angeles while wearing a tuque—a type of knitted hat.

Chuck Taylor said the video is "strikingly good" and "brings emotion and clarity to an artist that we are meeting for the first time". The Daily Edge disagreed, calling the video "drippy". VH1 ranked it 17th on its Top 40 Videos of the Year in 2006. It was nominated for the MuchMoreMusic Award at the 2006 MuchMusic Video Awards, but lost to Michael Bublé's "Save the Last Dance for Me". It was nominated for Best Male Video at the 2007 MTV Video Music Awards Japan, but "Age Age Every Knight" by DJ Ozma was the winner.

A lyrics video version of the song was released on Powter's YouTube channel on August 1, 2022. It features a hand-drawn appearance. Throughout the video, a man wearing a hooded jacket is walking along a sidewalk with a rain cloud above his head. At one point, he gets an umbrella, but later on, he gets splashed by a passing taxi. By the end, the weather clears up and the man meets up with a woman, finally smiling after a bad day.

== Usage in other media ==
"Bad Day" was much used in the media, to the point where Powter declared he felt "quite detached from th[e] song. It's more like it's everybody's song." According to Alan Connor: "...turning off the radio isn't enough to escape the tune. It can be heard everywhere from in shops, on mobiles and especially on TV." During Christmas 2004, the song was used in a Coca-Cola advertisement, which played in France for two weeks. It was also featured in a television advertisement for Right Guard deodorant in the United Kingdom, and the long-running NFL.com Fantasy Football Playoff Challenge ads in the United States, starting in 2007.

The fifth season of American Idol used "Bad Day" to underscore a montage of each contestant shown when they were eliminated. Although it was not his decision to have it on the show, Powter said: "I need every opportunity that I can to get the music out there". "Bad Day" was subsequently used in other shows, including the Brazilian series Malhação in 2005, and TV Asahi's 2006 Japanese drama Regatta: Kimi to Ita Eien. It was featured in the Veronica Mars episode "The Bitch Is Back" in 2007, and in a 2012 episode of the German show Danni Lowinski. In 2014, the song was used as Lestrade's ringtone for Sherlock Holmes and Joan Watson in an episode of Elementary, titled "The One Percent Solution". An FX promotional trailer for Fargo featured a muzak version of "Bad Day".

"Weird Al" Yankovic wanted to record a parody of the song in 2006, but Powter refused his proposal. Later, however, Powter decided to give him permission to record the parody, which was to have been called "You Had a Bad Date", but was told by Yankovic that "the train had left the station", as he recorded "White & Nerdy" the day after instead. In April 2006, "Bad Day" was parodied on an episode of the television series Saturday Night Live, featuring a montage of former member of the United States House of Representatives Tom DeLay. The Daily Show used the song for an American Idol-based montage satirizing the June 2006 death of Abu Musab al-Zarqawi, leader of Al-Qaeda in Iraq. It was parodied by comedy group Moron Life titled "Overplayed" and was released on MySpace in August 2006. "Bad Day" was also covered by the fictional music group Alvin and the Chipmunks for their 2007 film Alvin and the Chipmunks. Their version made the charts in January 2008, peaking at number 67 on the Billboard Hot 100.

== Live performances ==
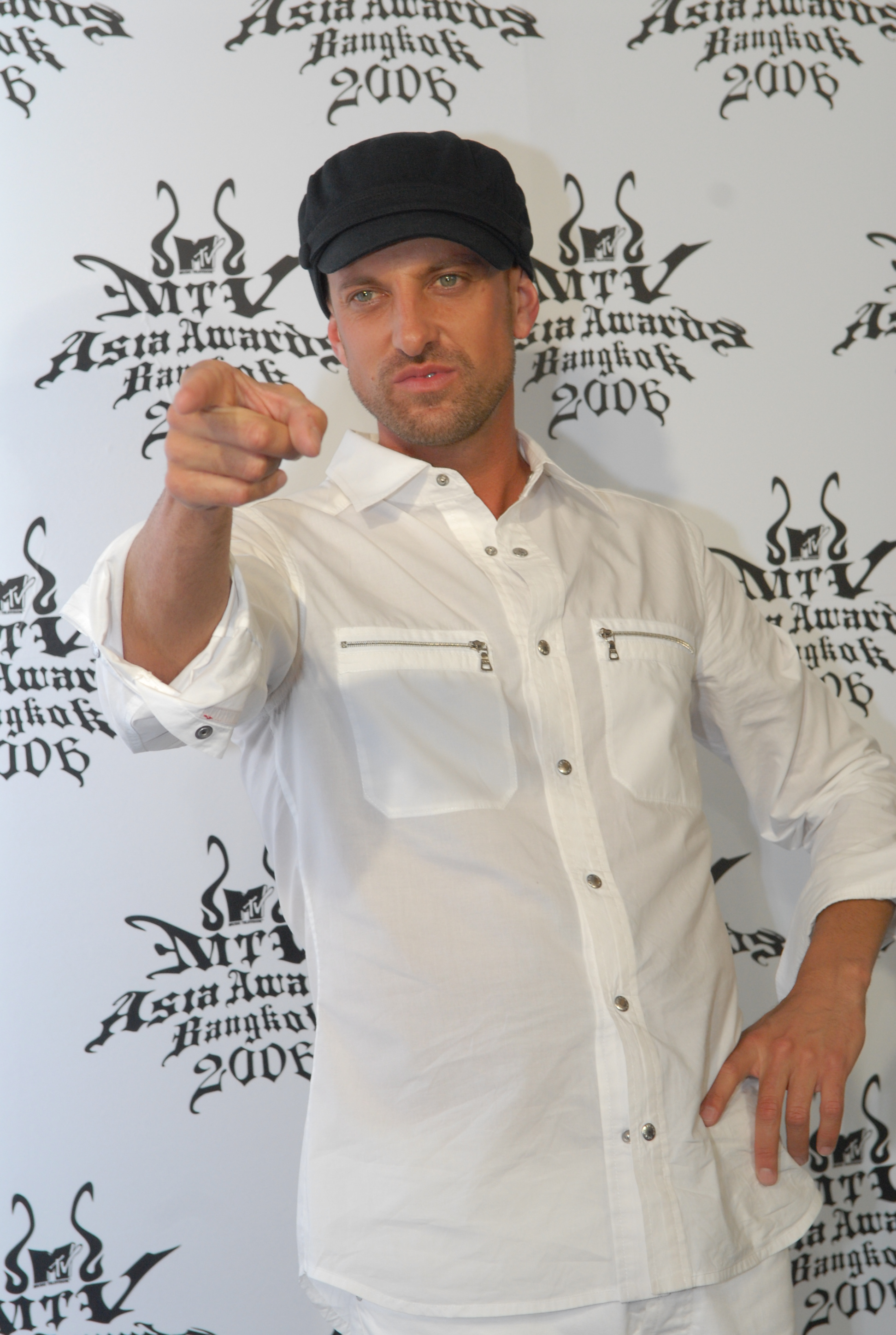
Powter at the MTV Asia Awards 2006, where he performed the song live.

Powter performed "Bad Day" during the Live 8 concert in Berlin on July 2, 2005, at the Siegessäule. He also performed the song at the MTV Asia Awards 2006 on May 6 at the Siam Paragon in Bangkok. During the penultimate episode of American Idol on May 23, 2006, Powter performed "Bad Day" at the Kodak Theatre. On May 26, 2007, he performed the song at the Saitama Super Arena during the MTV Video Music Awards Japan. Powter performed it in a duo with Japanese singer Ayaka on November 26, 2008, at Astro Hall in Harajuku, Japan.

Powter has performed the song on several television shows, including CD USA in February 2006, (Note: The program was recorded on February 9 and was aired on February 11.) and Total Request Live on April 6, 2006. On April 14, he sang it during the Today Show at the Rockfeller Center in the morning, and, at night, on the Late Night with Conan O'Brien. He sang it on Live with Regis and Kelly on April 18, on The Tonight Show with Jay Leno on April 24 and, on The Ellen DeGeneres Show on April 27. He performed again on Leno's and DeGeneres's shows on June 1 and on July 7 respectively, and appeared on The CBS Early Show to sing it on August 9.

The song was included on the set lists for Powter's European tour, in the United Kingdom, and in the United States to promote its parent album. In a performance in Chicago's Park West venue during the American tour, Andy Downing of the Chicago Tribune called the song "a high point" of the show, and said the slower version was prettier than the original record but that it was "the spartan arrangement" that saved it from "montage hell."

In 2024, Powter appeared on the fourth season of Canada's Got Talent, posing as an aspiring singer-songwriter with the judges only realizing who he actually was as he performed "Bad Day". According to Powter, he did so because despite having had one of the biggest pop hits of the 21st century, he had never actually had an opportunity to perform his music on Canadian television.

== Formats and track listings ==
- Barnes & Noble extended play
1. "Bad Day" – 3:53
2. "Free Loop" – 3:52
3. "Lie to Me" – 3:24
4. "Song 6" – 3:30
- Track single (Canada, France, Switzerland, UK)
1. "Bad Day" – 3:53
2. "Stupid Like This" – 3:23
- Maxi single (Australia, France, Germany, Italy, UK)
1. "Bad Day" – 3:53
2. "Stupid Like This" – 3:23
3. "Lost on The Stoop" – 4:10

== Credits and personnel ==
Credits adapted from the liner notes of Daniel Powter.

Personnel

- Songwriting – Daniel Powter
- Production – Mitchell Froom, Jeff Dawson
- Engineering – Jeff Dawson, David Boucher
- Mixing – David Boucher
- Mastering – Bob Ludwig
- Drums – Brendan Ostrander
- Guitar – Jeff Dawson, Val McCallum
- Keyboards – Mitchell Froom, Daniel Powter
- Bass – Davey Faragher, Darren Parris
- Programming – Jeff Dawson

== Charts ==
=== Weekly charts ===
Weekly all-format chart performance for "Bad Day"
Chart (2006)	Peak position
US Billboard Hot 100	1
US Pop 100 (Billboard)	1

Weekly sales chart performance for "Bad Day"
Chart (2005–2006)	Peak position
Australia (ARIA)	3
Austria (Ö3 Austria Top 40)	13
Belgium (Ultratop 50 Flanders)	5
Belgium (Ultratop 50 Wallonia)	7
Canada (Nielsen SoundScan)	7
Canada Digital Song Sales (Billboard)	6
Denmark (Tracklisten)	5
Europe (European Hot 100 Singles)	2
France (SNEP)	3
Germany (GfK)	17
Ireland (IRMA)	1
Italy (FIMI)	3
Japan Digital Songs (RIAJ)	5
Netherlands (Dutch Top 40)	6
Netherlands (Single Top 100)	10
New Zealand (Recorded Music NZ)	7
Norway (VG-lista)	7
Portugal (AFP)	2
Scottish Singles Sales (Official Charts)	1
Sweden (Sverigetopplistan)	8
Switzerland (Schweizer Hitparade)	5
UK Singles (Official Charts)	2

Weekly airplay chart performance for "Bad Day"
Chart (2005–2006)	Peak position
Canada AC Top 30 (Radio & Records)	1
Canada CHR/Pop Top 30 (Radio & Records)	14
Canada Hot AC Top 30 (Radio & Records)	1
Czech Republic (Rádio Top 100 Oficiální)	1
Europe (European Airplay 100)	1
Germany Airplay (BVMI)	1
Hungary (Rádiós Top 40)	3
Poland (Polish Airplay Charts)	3
UK Airplay (Music Week)	1
US Adult Pop Airplay (Billboard)	1
US Adult Contemporary (Billboard)	1
US Pop Airplay (Billboard)	2
Venezuela Pop Rock (Record Report)	7

==== Alvin and the Chipmunks version ====
Weekly chart performance for "Bad Day"
Chart (2008)	Peak position
Australia (ARIA)	22
US Billboard Hot 100	67

=== Year-end charts ===
2005 year-end chart performance for "Bad Day"
Chart (2005)	Position
Australia (ARIA)	18
Austria (Ö3 Austria Top 40)	40
Belgium (Ultratop 50 Flanders)	23
Belgium (Ultratop 50 Wallonia)	36
CIS (Tophit)	58
Europe (European Hot 100 Singles)	7
France (SNEP)	46
Germany (Media Control GfK)	52
Hungary (Rádiós Top 40)	13
Ireland (IRMA)	9
Italy (FIMI)	29
Netherlands (Dutch Top 40)	6
Netherlands (Single Top 100)	58
Russia Airplay (TopHit)	43
Sweden (Hitlistan)	17
Switzerland (Schweizer Hitparade)	32
UK Singles (OCC)	11
UK Airplay (Music Week)	3

2006 year-end chart performance for "Bad Day"
Chart (2006)	Position
Hungary (Rádiós Top 40)	40
UK Singles (OCC)	157
US Billboard Hot 100	1
US Adult Contemporary (Billboard)	3
US Adult Top 40 (Billboard)	2
US Pop 100 (Billboard)	4

2007 year-end chart performance for "Bad Day"
Chart (2007)	Position
US Adult Contemporary (Billboard)	17

=== Decade-end charts ===
Decade-end chart performance for "Bad Day"
Chart (2000–2009)	Position
US Billboard Hot 100	56

=== All-time charts ===
All-time chart performance for "Bad Day"
Chart	Position
US Adult Top 40 (Billboard)	47

== Certifications ==
Certifications and sales for "Bad Day"
Region	Certification	Certified units/sales
Australia (ARIA)	Platinum	70,000^{^}
Canada (Music Canada)	Platinum	20,000^{*}
Denmark (IFPI Danmark)	Platinum	90,000^{‡}
France (SNEP)	Silver	143,600
Germany (BVMI)	Gold	150,000^{^}
Italy (FIMI)	Platinum	50,000^{‡}
Japan (RIAJ) Digital single	2× Platinum	500,000^{*}
Japan (RIAJ) Full-length ringtone	Platinum	250,000^{*}
Japan (RIAJ) Ringtone	Million	1,000,000^{*}
Spain (Promusicae)	Gold	30,000^{‡}
United Kingdom (BPI)	2× Platinum	1,200,000^{‡}
United States (RIAA)	3× Platinum	3,000,000^{*}
Streaming
Japan (RIAJ)	Gold	50,000,000^{†}
^{*} Sales figures based on certification alone.^{^} Shipments figures based on certification alone.^{‡} Sales+streaming figures based on certification alone.^{†} Streaming-only figures based on certification alone.

== Release history ==
Release dates and formats for "Bad Day"
Country	Date	Format	Label	Ref.
France	Early 2005	Mainstream radio	Warner Bros.	
United States	February 8, 2005	Extended play	Warner Bros.; WEA	
United States	February 22, 2005	Digital download	Warner Bros.	
Switzerland	March 4, 2005	CD single	Warner Music Switzerland	
France	March 22, 2005	CD single	Warner Bros.	
Italy	May 18, 2005	Maxi single	Warner Bros.	
France	May 30, 2005	Maxi single	Mis	
Germany	May 30, 2005	Maxi single	Warner Bros.	
United States	June 13, 2005	Hot adult contemporary radio	Warner Bros.	
Australia	June 27, 2005	Maxi single	Warner Bros.; WEA	
United Kingdom	July 25, 2005	CD single	Warner Bros.	
United Kingdom	July 25, 2005	Maxi single	Warner Bros.	
Canada	July 28, 2005	CD single	WEA	
Japan	August 6, 2005	Digital download	WEA	

== See also ==
- 2005 in music
- 2006 in music
- Billboard Year-End Hot 100 singles of 2006
- List of Billboard Adult Contemporary number ones of 2006
