= Free Loop (One Night Stand) =

2005 single by Daniel Powter

Single by Daniel Powter

from the album Daniel Powter
- Released: November 7, 2005
- Length: 3:48
- Label: Warner Bros.
- Songwriter: Daniel Powter
- Producers: Mitchell Froom; Jeff Dawson

Daniel Powter singles chronology
"Bad Day" (2005)	"Free Loop (One Night Stand)" (2005)	"Jimmy Gets High" (2005)

"Free Loop (One Night Stand)" (titled "Free Loop" on Daniel Powter) is a song written by Canadian singer Daniel Powter. It was his second single and the follow-up to his successful song, "Bad Day". In the United Kingdom, the single was deemed ineligible to chart since a live version of "Bad Day" was included as a B-side whilst the original song was still present in the UK top 40 at the time. In the US, it did not chart on the Billboard Hot 100, but it did reach the top 30 of the Billboard Adult Contemporary chart.

== Music video ==
The video, directed by Marc Webb, who also directed the music videos for "Bad Day" and "Lie to Me," shows a young Daniel Powter starting at a piano in a music store and puts his fingers on the window and magically plays the piano. The scene then cuts to an adult version of Powter, who is now able to buy the piano. He then sees a note of eviction on his apartment door and has to sell the piano back to pay for the rent. After selling the piano back, he is shown at a bar where a talent scout talks to him about being part of a once-in-a-lifetime offer. Getting ready for his "big performance," he sees the piano demolished after being used in a strip club with glasses thrown at and prostitutes landing on the keys. He then takes it home and repairs it to its former glory. At the final scene he performs it at the "Millennium Biltmore Hotel," and gets an applause from crowd at the end of the song. All the scenes were filmed in California.

Powter explains that he wanted it to reflect on people, their relationships and himself, not about champagne or car rims: It's about people, relationships and situations in "...piano pop music, over-infatuated on steroids."

== Charts ==
Chart (2005–2006)	Peak position
Australia (ARIA)	43
Austria (Ö3 Austria Top 40)	62
Belgium (Ultratip Bubbling Under Flanders)	11
Belgium (Ultratip Bubbling Under Wallonia)	10
Canada AC Top 30 (Radio & Records)	17
Canada Hot AC Top 30 (Radio & Records)	7
Czech Republic Airplay (ČNS IFPI)	40
France (SNEP)	52
Germany (GfK)	55
Hungary (Rádiós Top 40)	40
New Zealand (Recorded Music NZ)	32
Switzerland (Schweizer Hitparade)	38
US Adult Contemporary (Billboard)	30

== Release history ==
Region	Date	Format(s)	Label(s)	Ref.
Australia	November 7, 2005	CD	Warner Bros.	
United Kingdom	November 7, 2005	CD	Warner Bros.	
