= Turn On the Lights (album) =

Studio album by Daniel Powter
- Released: 13 July 2012 (UK and US); 5 September 2012 (Japan); 17 March 2014 (Japan; including bonus tracks)
- Recorded: 2012–13
- Genre: Pop rock
- Length: 40:27; 54:47 (Including bonus tracks)
- Label: International Solutions/EMI, Avex
- Producer: Howard Benson

Daniel Powter chronology
Under the Radar (2008)	Turn On the Lights (2012)	Giants (2018)

Singles from Turn On the Lights
- 1. "Cupid" Released: 10 April 2012; 2. "Crazy All My Life" Released: 10 September 2012

Turn On the Lights is the fourth studio album by Canadian singer-songwriter Daniel Powter. The album was released in the United Kingdom on 13 July 2012. The album only entered the UK Albums Chart at number 109. It includes the singles "Cupid" and "Crazy All My Life". It features re-recordings of the three new songs (the other was "Lose To Win" already released as a single previously) from Powter's greatest hits album "Best of Me". They were "Come Back Home" (originally titled "Come Home"), "The Day We Never Met" (originally titled "Fall In Love (The Day We Never Met)") and a re-recording of the new version of "Best of Me", consisting of a brand new backing arrangement and a slightly different tune.

On 5 September 2013, Powter later released 4 new songs as bonus tracks for his album Turn On the Lights called "UR My Radio", "Doesn't Matter", "Cheers to Us" and "Goodbye". These tracks are only available in releases for the Japanese market and was released on 17 March 2014.

== Singles ==
- "Cupid" was released as the lead single from the album on 10 April 2012. The single peaked to number 195 on the UK Singles Chart.
- "Crazy All My Life" McDonough Management uploaded a lyric video to YouTube on 23 August 2012. The official video was filmed while Powter was on tour and then uploaded to YouTube on his official channel on 27 March 2013.

== Track listing ==
No.	Title	Length
1.	"Cupid"	3:42
2.	"The Day We Never Met"	3:46
3.	"Crazy All My Life"	4:25
4.	"Come Back Home"	3:48
5.	"Best of Me"	3:46
6.	"Selfish"	3:32
7.	"If Only I Could Cry"	3:21
8.	"Except The Blue"	3:47
9.	"Birthday Suits"	2:54
10.	"What I Meant To Say"	3:40
11.	"Tell Them Who You Are"	3:46
12.	"UR My Radio" (Japan bonus track)	3:51
13.	"Doesn't Matter" (Japan bonus track)	2:47
14.	"Cheers to Us" (Japan bonus track)	3:39
15.	"Goodbye" (Japan bonus track)	4:03

== Chart performance ==
Chart (2012)	Peak position
UK Albums Chart	109
Japanese Albums Chart	177

== Release history ==
Country	Date	Format	Label
United Kingdom	13 July 2012	Digital download	International Solutions/EMI
United Kingdom	16 July 2012	CD	International Solutions/EMI
Japan	5 September 2012	CD	Avex Group
