= Konk (band) =

American band

KONK
- KONK on the rooftop of Danceteria in New York City, circa 1983

Background information
- Origin: New York City, New York, United States
- Genres: No wave, Afro-punk, electro, funk
- Years active: 1981–1988
- Labels: 99 Records, Dog Brothers Records, Celluloid, Rough Trade, 4th & B'way, Soul Jazz, Sleeping Bag, Factory, Unleashed Music
- Members: Dana Vlcek; Geordie Gillespie; Richard Edson; Shannon Dawson; Scott Gillis; Jonny Sender; Angel Quinones
- Past members: Perkin Barnes; Joe Gallant; Katie Taylor; Daniel Sadownick; Al Diaz; Heather Earnest; Tomás Doncker
- Website: www.konknyc.com

KONK was an American band formed in 1980 in New York City and active until 1988 that emerged during a period marked by the post-punk/new wave and disco scenes which were prevalent at the time. KONK won the attention of both scenes by playing a hybrid of the two musical styles which involved the blending of a new wave attitude with the carefree nature of disco's dance crowd. KONK's musical influences ranged from Afrobeat, jazz and funk to hip hop. Given these influence KONK's style is noted as being highly percussive, and containing simple, yet strong, backing bass lines. As part of New York’s post-punk dance scene they regularly played alongside groups such as Liquid Liquid, Bush Tetras, ESG, the Peech Boys and the Lounge Lizards. They are included in a book by David Byrne and others on the New York post-punk scene.

== Members ==
KONK was formed by avant-garde jazz personality Dana Vlcek, and had among its many members:

- Richard Edson on drums, who also played drums on the first Sonic Youth record and had acting roles in films including Ferris Bueller's Day Off, Spike Lee's Do the Right Thing, and Jim Jarmusch's Stranger Than Paradise.
- Angel Quinones on congas, who later played for Jimmy Buffett.
- Shannon Dawson on the trumpet, who also was an early associate of Jean-Michel Basquiat in the band Gray, and who did some of the band's promo poster art work. He is the uncle of actress Rosario Dawson.
- Geordie Gillespie played drums and percussion, co-produced the songs, and was the band archivist.

The band was managed by Ken Sitz, later creative director of Conelrad.

== Discography ==
=== Albums ===
- Yo! (1983), Les Disques Du Crépuscule
- Jams (1988), Dog Brothers Records
- KONK: The Definitive Collection (10-song digital release, 2008), Unleashed Music
- KONK Live at CBGB (November 6, 1981) (8-song digital release, 2009), Unleashed Music

=== Compilations ===
- The Sound of KONK (Tales of the New York Underground 1981-88) (2004), Soul Jazz

==== Compilation appearances ====
- New York Noise - "Baby Dee" (2003), Soul Jazz

=== Singles and EPs ===
- "Soka-Loka-Moki" (1981), Konk Organization, distributed by 99 Records
- Konk Party (4 tracks) (1982), Les Disques Du Crépuscule/Interference
- Konk Party (4 tracks) (1983), Celluloid
- "Your Life" (1984), Sleeping Bag
- Your Life (4 tracks) (1984), Sleeping Bag
- "Love Attack" (1986), Dog Brothers Records
- "Machine" (1987), Dog Brothers Records

=== Billboard charting releases ===
- "Your Life" - No. 5 Dance (August 11, 1984)
- KONK Jams LP Cuts - No. 30 (May 7, 1988)

== Usage in film ==
- Bright Lights Big City - dir. James Bridges, song - "Love Attack"
- Broken Embraces - dir. Pedro Almodóvar, song - "Your Life"
- Jean-Michel Basquiat: The Radiant Child - dir. Tamra Davis, song - "Your Life"
