= Daniel Powter (album) =

Studio album by Daniel Powter
- Released: July 26, 2005
- Recorded: 2002 (“Bad Day”), September 2004 – March 2005
- Genre: Indie pop; pop rock
- Length: 37:05; 102:40 (Deluxe version)
- Label: Warner Bros. Records
- Producer: Jeff Dawson; Mitchell Froom

Daniel Powter chronology
I'm Your Betty (2000)	Daniel Powter (2005)	Under the Radar (2008)

Singles from Daniel Powter
- 1. "Bad Day" Released: January 9, 2005; 2. "Jimmy Gets High" Released: August 19, 2005; 3. "Free Loop" Released: November 7, 2005; 4. "Lie to Me" Released: April 17, 2006; 5. "Love You Lately" Released: September 19, 2006

Professional ratings
Aggregate scores
Source	Rating
Metacritic	54/100
Review scores
Source	Rating
Allmusic	3/5 stars
Entertainment Weekly	C
Gigwise	3/5 stars
PopMatters	7/10
Rolling Stone	3/5 stars

Daniel Powter (also known as DP) is the second studio album by Canadian singer-songwriter Daniel Powter, released on July 26, 2005, in Canada and on April 11, 2006, in the United States. The album debuted at No. 9 on the Billboard 200 with 89,213 copies sold that week. The album debuted on the Japanese Oricon charts at number 242. However, the album slowly climbed the charts and eventually peaked at number four. The album eventually became the eighteenth best-selling album of 2006 in Japan with 584,000 copies sold and was the highest-ranked Western album on the year-end chart. The album was certified gold in the U.S. on May 24, 2006.

== Critical reception ==
Daniel Powter was met with "mixed or average" reviews from critics. At Metacritic, which assigns a weighted average rating out of 100 to reviews from mainstream publications, this release received an average score of 54 based on 11 reviews.

In a review for AllMusic, critic reviewer Stephen Thomas Erlewine wrote: "Nevertheless, as a record - as a series of expertly produced, expertly recorded adult pop tunes - Daniel Powter is a debut that's easy to enjoy, thanks to Powter's melodic skills and sweet voice." At Rolling Stone, Barry Walters said: "Lacking the star personality of a Robbie Williams or the wit of a Ben Folds, Powter doesn't rise above his instantly familiar keyboard riffs, yet neither does he drown in them. Instead he rides the hooks that propelled "Bad Day" from its background use in American Idol to the charts, while producer Mitchell Froom supplies the ear candy."

== Track listing ==
All tracks are written by Daniel Powter.

Daniel Powter track listing
No.	Title	Length
1.	"Song 6"	3:30
2.	"Free Loop"	3:48
3.	"Bad Day"	3:54
4.	"Suspect"	3:56
5.	"Lie to Me"	3:25
6.	"Jimmy Gets High"	3:40
7.	"Styrofoam"	3:34
8.	"Hollywood"	3:34
9.	"Lost on the Stoop"	4:09
10.	"Give Me Life"	3:35

iTunes deluxe version
No.	Title	Length
1.	"Love You Lately"	3:00
2.	"Song 6"	3:30
3.	"Free Loop"	3:48
4.	"Bad Day"	3:54
5.	"Suspect"	3:56
6.	"Lie to Me"	3:25
7.	"Jimmy Gets High"	3:40
8.	"Styrofoam"	3:34
9.	"Hollywood"	3:34
10.	"Lost on the Stoop"	4:09
11.	"Give Me Life"	3:35

AUDIO (In High-Resolution Stereo)

B-Sides

1. "Bad Day" (Acoustic Version- Recorded for NRJ)
2. "Styrofoam" (Live at La Cigale, Paris)
3. "Free Loop" (Live at La Cigale, Paris)
4. "Song 6" (Live in Vienna for Hitradio Ö3)
5. "Bad Day" (Live in Vienna for Hitradio Ö3)
6. "Stupid Like This"

VIDEO

Music Videos

1. "Bad Day"
2. "Jimmy Gets High"
3. "Free Loop"
4. "Lie to Me"

Live From "Studio A"

1. "Free Loop"
2. "Bad Day"
3. "Styrofoam"
4. "Wasted"
5. "Back on the Streets"
6. "Stupid Like This"
7. "Song 6" (Solo)
8. "Free Loop" (Solo)

== Singles ==
- "Bad Day" was released on June 27, 2005, in Australia and on July 25 in the United Kingdom and features two b-sides: a non-album track, "Stupid Like This", and "Lost On the Stoop".
- "Free Loop" was released on November 7, 2005, in the United Kingdom, where it was later deemed ineligible to chart.
- "Jimmy Gets High" was released in 2005 in Canada. A music video was in rotation on MuchMoreMusic.
- "Lie to Me" was released on April 17, 2006, in the United Kingdom, where it debuted and peaked at No. 40 due to more complications.
- "Love You Lately" was released to iTunes in the United States on September 19, 2006, and went for U.S. Adult Contemporary + Hot Adult Contemporary adds on October 16. It was the second U.S. single for Powter from a re-release/deluxe edition of his self-titled album.

== Personnel ==
Musicians

- Daniel Powter – vocals, piano, keyboards
- Matt Chamberlain – drums
- Brendan Ostrander – drums
- Darren Parris – bass
- Davey Faragher – bass
- Mitchell Froom – keyboards
- Jeff Dawson – guitar
- Val McCallum – guitar

Production

- Jeff Dawson – producer, engineer
- Mitchell Froom – producer
- Bob Ludwig – mastering
- David Boucher – engineer, mixing

== Charts ==
=== Weekly charts ===
Chart (2005–2006)	Peak position
Australian Albums (ARIA)	14
Austrian Albums (Ö3 Austria)	43
Belgian Albums (Ultratop Flanders)	32
Belgian Albums (Ultratop Wallonia)	18
Canadian Albums (Nielsen SoundScan)	27
Danish Albums (Hitlisten)	14
Dutch Albums (Album Top 100)	29
French Albums (SNEP)	14
German Albums (Offizielle Top 100)	42
Hungarian Albums (MAHASZ)	36
Irish Albums (IRMA)	8
Italian Albums (FIMI)	37
Japanese Albums (Oricon)	4
New Zealand Albums (RMNZ)	6
Norwegian Albums (VG-lista)	6
Scottish Albums (OCC)	4
Swedish Albums (Sverigetopplistan)	26
Swiss Albums (Schweizer Hitparade)	14
Taiwanese Albums (Five Music)	2
UK Albums (OCC)	5
US Billboard 200	9

=== Year-end charts ===
Chart (2005)	Position
Belgian Albums (Ultratop Wallonia)	67
French Albums (SNEP)	44
Swiss Albums (Schweizer Hitparade)	51
UK Albums (OCC)	62

Chart (2006)	Position
US Billboard 200	129

== Certifications ==
Region	Certification	Certified units/sales
Australia (ARIA)	Gold	35,000^{^}
Canada (Music Canada)	Gold	50,000^{^}
France (SNEP)	Platinum	200,000^{*}
Ireland (IRMA)	Platinum	15,000^{^}
Japan (RIAJ)	3× Platinum	750,000^{^}
New Zealand (RMNZ)	Gold	7,500^{^}
Switzerland (IFPI Switzerland)	Gold	20,000^{^}
United Kingdom (BPI)	Platinum	300,000^{*}
United States (RIAA)	Gold	500,000^{^}
^{*} Sales figures based on certification alone.^{^} Shipments figures based on certification alone.

== Release history ==
Country	Release date
Europe	August 8, 2005
Japan	March 8, 2006
United States	April 11, 2006
