= Unleashed Music =

- Founded: 1988
- Founder: Geordie Gillespie; Shannon Dawson; Jonathan Destler
- Headquarters: Venice, Los Angeles, California, United States
- Key people: Geordie Gillespie; Gina Juliano
- Website: http://www.unleashedmusic.com

Unleashed Music is a Los Angeles–based marketing, management, label services and publishing consultancy, as well as an independent record label.

== Company history ==
Unleashed Music was formed in New York City by musician and entrepreneur, Geordie Gillespie. It originated in 1988 as the publishing division of Dog Brothers Records, to administer the music of Konk (band).

In 2006, after 20 years of major label experience, Gillespie sought to expand the company's vision. The goal was to anticipate and utilize new media trends, platforms and strategies, while creating strong and equitable partnerships to develop artists' careers. By bundling marketing, promotion and production services, the company is structured to support any component of a music campaign.

== Mission statement ==
Unleashed Music provides services and guidance to artists, labels, and organizations that seek to navigate, thrive and build success in the ever-changing music business landscape.

== Rhythms del Mundo ==
In 2010 Unleashed Music released Rhythms del Mundo Revival. Rhythms del Mundo Revival is a nonprofit collaborative album, produced by Kenny Young, which fuses an all-star cast of Cuban musicians including Ibrahim Ferrer and Omara Portuondo of the Buena Vista Social Club with tracks from US, UK and Irish artists such as the Gorillaz, Dizzee Rascal, Bob Dylan, Groove Armada, Franz Ferdinand, and a collaboration between Coldplay and Lele.

The compilation was released together with Artists' Project Earth.

== Artist campaigns ==
- American Woves
- Christopher Shayne
- Miss Palmer
- Ruby
- Bethesda
- Vayden
- Ladina Spence
- John Vlasic
- Samantha Ronson
- Craving Lucy
- Silent Season
- iHeartStereo
- Little Hurricane
- Little Barrie
- Uncle Daddy
- The Adventures Of..
- Chris Shinn
- The Whigs
- Deadmau5
- Until June
- Delta Spirit
- Iyeoka Okoawo

== Label releases ==
- Rhythms del Mundo Revival
- Vayden
- Vayden "HAM"
- Konk – Definitive Collection
- Konk – Konk Party
- Konk – Live at CBGB
- Konk – Your LIfe
- Hide Your Kids – Bed Intruder
