= Ilona Felicjańska =

Polish model

Ilona Katarzyna Montana
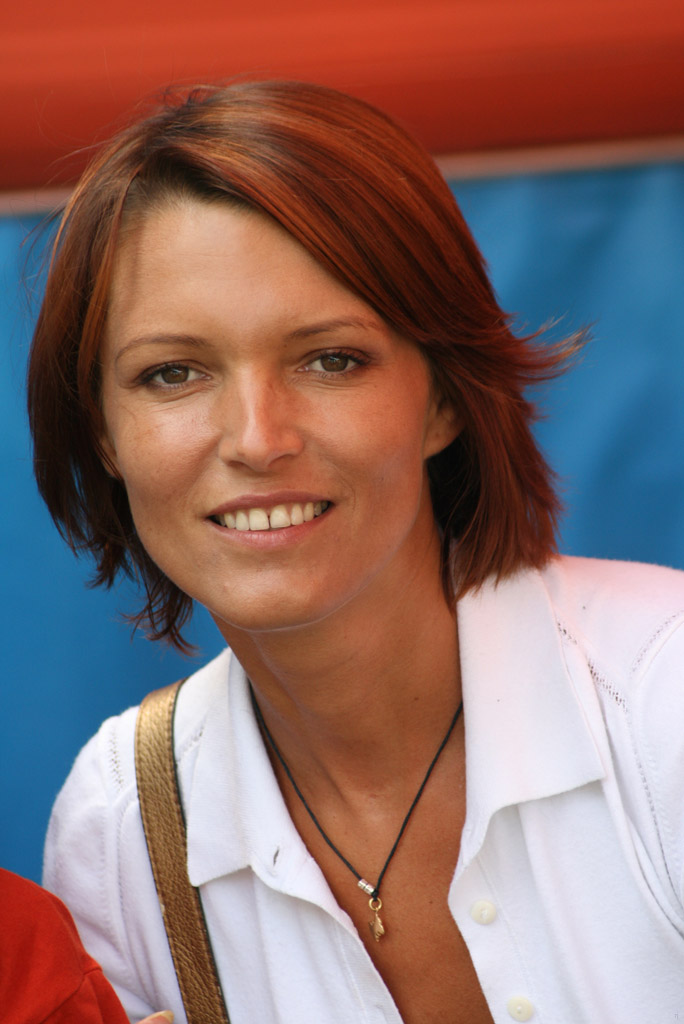
- Felicjańska in 2007
- Born: I.K.Felicjańska; 30 May 1970 (age 56); Łask, Poland
- Modeling information
- Height: 178 cm (5 ft 10 in)
- Hair color: brown
- Eye color: brown
- Agency: Model Plus: Warsaw Berlin Models: Berlin, Santiago Karin: Paris

Ilona Katarzyna Montana (born 30 May 1970) is a Polish model, Miss Polonia 1993, businesswoman, and founder and president of the foundation "Niezapominajka".

In 1993 was the second Miss Polonia, took part in the competition Miss International 1994 Japanese and was a finalist for Elite Model Look. In 1994 she made her debut on the catwalk collection defunct Moda Polska, has signed a contract with a reputable Warsaw agency fashion Model Plus. In 1994-1995, she participated in demonstrations pret-a-porter in Paris, was a star on the catwalks at Calvin Klein and Pierre Cardin. In 1995-1996 worked with the Berlin modeling agency Berlin Models, so that took part in fashion shows in Berlin and the opening of the Berlin branch agencies Models in Santiago. In Polish usually appeared on the catwalks at: Teresa Rosati, Anna Brodzinska, Joanna Klimas, Hexeline and Maciej Zień. Also tied to advertising: among other things, to promote cosmetics Miss Sporty, soap Palmolive and creams Irena Eris (1999-2000). In 2003 she took part in several sessions of fashion: Mariella Burani, Teresa Rosati, Diesel and La Copein. Tied to the advertising contract with the brand Hexeline. In 2005 she was the ambassador of Italian fashion house MaxMara. In 2007, she was the brand ambassador Alfa Romeo.

From time to time Ilona appears on local fashion shows in Warsaw, where she presents collections.
