= The Afterlove Tour =

2017–18 concert tour by James Blunt

- Tour by James Blunt
- Promotional poster for the tour
- Associated album: The Afterlove
- Start date: 12 October 2017
- End date: 15 September 2018
- Legs: 6
- No. of shows: 85 in Europe; 7 in South America; 9 in Australasia; 9 in Asia; 110 Total

James Blunt concert chronology
- Moon Landing World Tour (2014–15); The Afterlove Tour (2017–18); Once Upon a Mind Tour (2020)

The Afterlove Tour is the fifth concert tour by English recording artist James Blunt. Launched in support of his fifth studio album, The Afterlove (2017). Beginning in October 2017, the tour played over 100 shows in Europe, Asia, Australasia and South America.

== Background ==
Blunt mentioned touring alongside his album announcement in December 2016. A month later, shows in Europe were announced for the fall of 2017. During the summer, Blunt joined Ed Sheeran on the North American leg of his tour. After this stint with Sheeran, Blunt revealed shows in Australia and New Zealand.

== Opening acts ==
- Jamie Lawson (Europe, Leg 1)
- Morgan Evans (Sydney, Melbourne)
- Mainfelt (Rankweil)
- Madison Violet (Rankweil)
- Mattia De Simone (Genoa, Padua)

== Setlist ==
The following setlist was obtained from the 18 October 2017 concert, held at the Lanxess Arena in Cologne, Germany. It does not represent all concerts for the duration of the tour.

1. "Heart to Heart"
2. "I'll Take Everything"
3. "Wisemen"
4. "Heartbeat"
5. "Someone Singing Along"
6. "Lose My Number"
7. "Carry You Home"
8. "Postcards"
9. "Make Me Better"
10. "Goodbye My Lover"
11. "Time of Our Lives"
12. "High"
13. "You're Beautiful"
14. "Bartender"
15. "OK"
16. "Same Mistake"

Encore

17. "Don't Give Me Those Eyes"
18. "Stay the Night"
19. "1973"
20. "Bonfire Heart"

== Tour dates ==
List of 2017 concerts
Date	City	Country	Venue
12 October 2017	Stuttgart	Germany	Hanns-Martin-Schleyer-Halle
13 October 2017	Munich	Germany	Olympiahalle
14 October 2017	Erfurt	Germany	Messehallen Erfurt
16 October 2017	Berlin	Germany	Mercedes-Benz Arena
17 October 2017	Hamburg	Germany	Barclaycard Arena
18 October 2017	Cologne	Germany	Lanxess Arena
19 October 2017	Leipzig	Germany	Arena Leipzig
21 October 2017	Hanover	Germany	TUI Arena
22 October 2017	Frankfurt	Germany	Festhalle Frankfurt
24 October 2017	Halle	Germany	Gerry Weber Stadion
25 October 2017	Oberhausen	Germany	König Pilsener Arena
26 October 2017	Mannheim	Germany	SAP Arena
28 October 2017	Nuremberg	Germany	Arena Nürnberger Versicherung
29 October 2017	Kempten	Germany	Bigbox Allgäu
31 October 2017	Vienna	Austria	Wiener Stadthalle
1 November 2017	Salzburg	Austria	Salzburgarena
3 November 2017	Brussels	Belgium	Forest National
4 November 2017	Trier	Germany	Arena Trier
6 November 2017	Amsterdam	Netherlands	AFAS Live
7 November 2017	Paris	France	Zénith Paris
8 November 2017	Geneva	Switzerland	SEG Geneva Arena
9 November 2017	Zürich	Switzerland	Hallenstadion
12 November 2017	Rome	Italy	PalaLottomatica
13 November 2017	Florence	Italy	Nelson Mandela Forum
14 November 2017	Milan	Italy	Mediolanum Forum
17 November 2017	Nottingham	England	Motorpoint Arena
18 November 2017	Leeds	England	First Direct Arena
20 November 2017	Glasgow	Scotland	SEC Armadillo
21 November 2017	Birmingham	England	Arena Birmingham
23 November 2017	London	England	Eventim Apollo
24 November 2017	Brighton	England	Brighton Centre
25 November 2017	Bournemouth	England	Windsor Hall
27 November 2017	Dublin	Ireland	3Arena

List of 2018 concerts
Date	City	Country	Venue
22 February 2018	Ciudad de la Costa	Uruguay	Centro de Espectáculos Landia
23 February 2018	Corrientes	Argentina	Estadio Abierto de Deportivo Juventus
24 February 2018	Buenos Aires	Argentina	Estadio Luna Park
25 February 2018	São Paulo	Brazil	Tom Brasil
27 February 2018	Córdoba	Argentina	Quality Espacio
1 March 2018	Mostazal	Chile	Gran Arena
2 March 2018	Santiago	Chile	Teatro Caupolicán
6 March 2018	Auckland	New Zealand	Spark Arena
8 March 2018	Christchurch	New Zealand	Horncastle Arena
10 March 2018^{[A]}	Pokolbin	Australia	Bimbadgen Amphitheatre
11 March 2018^{[A]}	Mount Cotton	Australia	Sirromet Winery
13 March 2018	Sydney	Australia	The Star Event Centre
14 March 2018	Sydney	Australia	The Star Event Centre
16 March 2018	Melbourne	Australia	Palais Theatre
17 March 2018^{[A]}	Wahgunyah	Australia	All Saints Estate
20 March 2018^{[A]}	Perth	Australia	Pioneer Women's Memorial
23 March 2018	Tampines	Singapore	Max Pavilion
25 March 2018	Bentong	Malaysia	Arena of Stars
27 March 2018	Bangkok	Thailand	Royal Paragon Hall
29 March 2018	Chek Lap Kok	Hong Kong	VIVA
31 March 2018	Taipei	Taiwan	TPEC Gymnasium
2 April 2018	Guangzhou	China	Sun Yat-sen Memorial Hall
4 April 2018	Shanghai	China	Mercedes-Benz Arena
6 April 2018	Beijing	China	Cadillac Arena
9 April 2018	Bengaluru	India	Phoenix Marketcity
8 May 2018	Budapest	Hungary	László Papp Budapest Sports Arena
10 May 2018	Bratislava	Slovakia	Aegon Arena
12 May 2018	Warsaw	Poland	Torwar Hall
14 May 2018	Saint Petersburg	Russia	Oktyabrskiy Big Concert Hall
16 May 2018	Krasnogorsk	Russia	Crocus City Hall
18 May 2018	Vilnius	Lithuania	Siemens Arena
19 May 2018	Tallinn	Estonia	Nordea Kontserdimaja
20 May 2018	Riga	Latvia	Arēna Rīga
22 May 2018	Oslo	Norway	Sentrum Scene
23 May 2018	Stockholm	Sweden	Annexet
24 May 2018^{[B]}	Jelling	Denmark	Jelling Festivalpladsen
25 May 2018^{[C]}	Hanover	Germany	Expo Plaza
26 May 2018^{[D]}	Tbilisi	Georgia	Mikheil Meskhi Stadium
16 June 2018^{[E]}	London	England	Royal Hospital Chelsea
18 June 2018	Douglas	Isle of Man	Royal Hall
29 June 2018^{[F]}	Newmarket	England	Adnams July Course
1 July 2018^{[G]}	Rankwell	Austria	Marktplatz Rankweil
6 July 2018^{[H]}	Cognac	France	Jardin public de Cognac
8 July 2018^{[I]}	Albi	France	Base de Loisirs de Pratgraussals
10 July 2018	Genoa	Italy	Arena del Mare
11 July 2018	Padua	Italy	Gran Teatro Geox
13 July 2018^{[J]}	Pistoia	Italy	Piazza del Duomo
15 July 2018^{[K]}	Locarno	Switzerland	Piazza Grande
16 July 2018^{[L]}	Carpi	Italy	Piazza dei Martiri
17 July 2018^{[M]}	Rome	Italy	Cavea dell'Auditorium Parco della Musica
20 July 2018^{[N]}	Pori	Finland	Kirjurinluoto Arena
22 July 2018	Balingen	Germany	Balinger Marktplatz
23 July 2018	Freiburg im Breisgau	Germany	Fürstenberg Freilichtbühne
24 July 2018	Dresden	Germany	Junge Garde
26 July 2018^{[O]}	Tettnang	Germany	Schlossgarten Tettnang
27 July 2018	Klam	Austria	Burg Clam
28 July 2018^{[P]}	Tüßling	Germany	Schlossgarten Tüßling
29 July 2018^{[Q]}	Ludwigsburg	Germany	Schlosshof de Residenzschloss
3 August 2018^{[R]}	Marbella	Spain	Auditorio de Marbella
4 August 2018^{[S]}	Borriana	Spain	Playa de L'Arenal
5 August 2018^{[T]}	Calella de Palafrugell	Spain	Auditori a l'aire liure
8 August 2018	Klagenfurt	Austria	Open Air Gelände der Schleppe Alm
9 August 2018^{[U]}	Hückelhoven	Germany	Schacht 3
10 August 2018^{[V]}	Heidenheim	Germany	Brenz-Arena
11 August 2018^{[W]}	Schaffhausen	Switzerland	Deutschschweizer Piazza Grande
12 August 2018^{[X]}	Zofingen	Switzerland	Heitere-Platz
15 August 2018^{[Y]}	Avenches	Switzerland	Amphithéâtre d'Avenches
16 August 2018^{[Z]}	Aschaffenburg	Germany	Darmstädter Straße
17 August 2018^{[AA]}	Bochum	Germany	Kemnader See
18 August 2018^{[AB]}	Coburg	Germany	Coburger Schloßplatz
31 August 2018^{[AC]}	Brașov	Romania	Piața Sfatului
1 September 2018^{[AD]}	Papenburg	Germany	Veranstaltungsgelände vor der Meyer-Werft
2 September 2018^{[AE]}	Berlin	Germany	IFA Sommergarten
8 September 2018^{[AF]}	Havirov	Czech Republic	Městská sportovní hala Slávie
13 September 2018	Saint Helier	Jersey	Gloucester Hall
15 September 2018^{[AG]}	Bath	England	Bath Racecourse

Festivals and other miscellaneous performances

^{A} This concert was a part of "A Day on the Green"
^{B} This concert was a part of the "Jelling Musikfestival"
^{D} This concert was a part of the "NDR 2 Plaza Festival"
^{D} This concert was a part of the "Independence Day Festival"
^{E} This concert was a part of "Live at Chelsea"
^{F} This concert was a part of "Newmarket Nights"
^{G} This concert was a part of the "Rankweiler Open Air"
^{H} This concert was a part of the "Festival Blues Passions de Cognac"
^{I} This concert was a part of the "Festival Pause Guitare"
^{J} This concert was a part of the "Pistoia Blues Festival"
^{K} This concert was a part of "Moon and Stars"
^{L} This concert was a part of the "Carpi Summer Fest"
^{M} This concert was a part of the "Roma Summer Fest"
^{N} This concert was a part of "Pori Jazz"
^{O} This concert was a part of the "Regionalwerk Bodensee-Schlossgarten Open Air"
^{P} This concert was a part of "Raiffeisen Kultursommer"
^{Q} This concert was a part of "KSK Music Open"
^{R} This concert was a part of the "Starlite Festival"
^{S} This concert was a part of the "Arenal Sound Festival"
^{T} This concert was a part of the "Cap Roig Festival"
^{U} This concert was a part of "SommerMusik"
^{V} This concert was a part of the "Brenzpark-Festival"
^{W} This concert was a part of "Stars in Town"
^{X} This concert was a part of the "Heitere Open Air"
^{Y} This concert was a part of "Rock Oz'Arènes"
^{Z} This concert was a part of the "Afrika-Karibik-Festival"
^{AA} This concert was a part of the "Zeltfestival Ruhr"
^{AB} This concert was a part of the "HUK-Open-Air-Sommer"
^{AC} This concert is a part of "Cerbul de Aur"
^{AD} This concert is a part of the "NDR 2 Papenburg Festival"
^{AE} This concert is a part of "IFA-Konzerte unter dem Funkturm"
^{AF} This concert is a part of "Havířovské slavnosti"
^{AG} This concert is a part of the "Bath Cup Festival"

Cancellations and rescheduled shows

23 February 2018	Corrientes, Argentina	Estadio José Jorge Conte	Moved to the Estadio Abierto de Deportivo Juventus
23 March 2018	Marina Bay, Singapore	Marina Bay Sands Expo Ballroom	Moved to the Max Pavilion in Tampines, Singapore
27 March 2018	Bangkok, Thailand	Impact Arena	Moved to the Thunder Dome
27 March 2018	Bangkok, Thailand	Thunder Dome	Moved to the Royal Paragon Hall

=== Box office score data ===
Venue	City	Tickets sold / Available	Gross revenue
Hanns-Martin-Schleyer-Halle	Stuttgart	6,309 / 8,994 (70%)	$327,536
Olympiahalle	Munich	7,518 / 10,255 (73%)	$405,811
Messehallen Erfurt	Erfurt	5,470 / 5,583 (98%)	$283,761
Mercedes-Benz Arena	Berlin	7,437 / 9,733 (76%)	$371,238
Barclaycard Arena	Hamburg	5,382 / 7,750 (69%)	$285,394
Lanxess Arena	Cologne	6,004 / 13,476 (45%)	$331,690
Arena Leipzig	Leipzig	5,570 / 7,618 (73%)	$289,105
TUI Arena	Hanover	6,961 / 8,805 (79%)	$358,463
Festhalle Frankfurt	Frankfurt	6,385 / 7,914 (81%)	$344,334
Gerry Weber Stadion	Halle	3,004 / 3,338 (90%)	$163,885
SAP Arena	Mannheim	4,405 / 8,428 (52%)	$233,350
Arena Nürnberger Versicherung	Nuremberg	6,704 / 6,704 (100%)	$260,173
Bigbox Allgäu	Kempten	3,973 / 3,973 (100%)	$168,095
Wiener Stadthalle	Vienna	6,020 / 11,533 (52%)	$320,978
Salzburgarena	Salzburg	3,068 / 5,682 (54%)	$163,668
Arena Trier	Trier	4,302 / 4,302 (100%)	$208,808
Hallenstadion	Zürich	10,806 / 13,000 (83%)	$767,701
Eventim Apollo	London	3,422 / 3,422 (100%)	$250,632
TOTAL		102,740 / 140,510 (73%)	$5,534,622
