= Moon Landing World Tour =

2014–15 concert tour by James Blunt

- Tour by James Blunt
- Promotional poster for tour
- Associated album: Moon Landing
- Start date: 2 February 2014
- End date: 22 March 2015
- Legs: 8
- No. of shows: 8 in Asia; 106 in Europe; 19 in North America; 16 in Australia; 7 in Africa; 7 in South America; 163 total

James Blunt concert chronology
- Some Kind of Trouble Tour (2011–12); Moon Landing World Tour (2014–15); The Afterlove World Tour (2017–18)

The Moon Landing World Tour is the fourth concert tour by English recording artist James Blunt. Launched in support of his fourth studio album, Moon Landing (2013), the tour began in January 2014. It continued into 2014 and 2015 with over 150 shows in the Americas, Europe, Australasia, Asia and Africa.

== Opening acts ==
- Anna F. (Europe—1st leg)
- Shake Shake Go (United Kingdom—April 2014)
- Oh Honey (North America)
- Busby Marou (New Zealand, Australia)
- Gavin James (Europe—3rd leg, United Kingdom—June 2014)
- Josh Record (Germany—October 2014, Warsaw, Cluj-Napoca)
- Sick Puppies (Moscow)
- Rea Garvey (Kufstein, Reifnitz)
- Julian Le Play (Kufstein, Reifnitz)
- Mary Spender (Warsaw)
- The Majority Says (Stockholm, Linköping, Malmö)
- Bogi (Budapest)
- Lacey (Nottingham)
- Drew Allen (Bournemouth—November 2014)

== Setlist ==
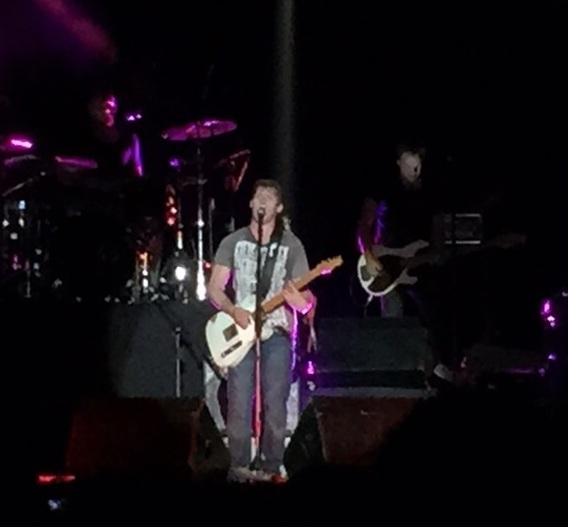
Blunt performing in Asunción, Paraguay

The following setlist was obtained from the 8 June 2014 concert; held at the Plenary Hall in Melbourne, Australia. It does not represent all concerts for the duration of the tour.

1. "Face the Sun"
2. "I'll Take Everything"
3. "Blue on Blue"
4. "High"
5. "Billy"
6. "Wisemen"
7. "Carry You Home"
8. "Satellites"
9. "These Are the Words"
10. "Miss America"
11. "Postcards"
12. "Goodbye My Lover"
13. "I Really Want You"
14. "Coz I Luv You"
15. "Heart to Heart"
16. "Same Mistake"
17. "You're Beautiful"
18. "So Long, Jimmy"

Encore

19. "Bonfire Heart"
20. "Stay the Night"
21. "1973"

== Tour dates ==
List of 2014 concerts
Date	City	Country	Venue	Attendance	Revenue
2 February 2014	Shanghai	China	Mercedes-Benz Arena	—	—
4 February 2014	Beijing	China	MasterCard Center	—	—
5 February 2014	Chengdu	China	Sichuan Provincial Gymnasium	—	—
7 February 2014	Shenzhen	China	Shenzhen Bay Gymnasium	—	—
12 February 2014	Chek Lap Kok	Hong Kong	AsiaWorld–Arena	—	—
27 February 2014	Killarney	Ireland	INEC Killarney	—	—
28 February 2014	Dublin	Ireland	Vicar Street	—	—
2 March 2014	Amsterdam	Netherlands	Heineken Music Hall	—	—
3 March 2014	Berlin	Germany	O_{2} World	10,228 / 11,902	$511,885
4 March 2014	Hamburg	Germany	O_{2} World Hamburg	10,148 / 14,015	$508,320
5 March 2014	Oberhausen	Germany	König Pilsener Arena	8,563 / 9,264	$442,614
6 March 2014	Frankfurt	Germany	Festhalle Frankfurt	7,253 / 7,260	$386,645
8 March 2014	Cologne	Germany	Lanxess Arena	12,507 / 13,146	$636,287
9 March 2014	Lingen	Germany	EmslandArena	3,110 / 3,110	$204,783
10 March 2014	Hanover	Germany	TUI Arena	8,393 / 9,276	$429,609
11 March 2014	Leipzig	Germany	Arena Leipzig	7,539 / 7,539	$364,466
13 March 2014	Munich	Germany	Olympiahalle	10,315 / 10,756	$550,153
14 March 2014	Kempten	Germany	Bigbox Allgäu	3,920 / 3,920	$218,128
15 March 2014	Nuremberg	Germany	Arena Nürnberger Versicherung	6,123 / 6,123	$342,934
17 March 2014	Zürich	Switzerland	Hallenstadion	13,000 / 13,000	$1,065,380
18 March 2014	Milan	Italy	Mediolanum Forum	—	—
19 March 2014	Salzburg	Austria	Salzburgarena	4,522 / 4,522	$258,291
20 March 2014	Vienna	Austria	Wiener Stadthalle	9,778 / 9,800	$547,460
22 March 2014	Stuttgart	Germany	Hanns-Martin-Schleyer-Halle	9,579 / 9,579	$465,733
23 March 2014	Amnéville	France	Galaxie d'Amnéville	—	—
24 March 2014	Geneva	Switzerland	SEG Geneva Arena	—	—
25 March 2014	Paris	France	Zénith Paris	—	—
28 March 2014	Clermont-Ferrand	France	Zénith d'Auvergne	—	—
29 March 2014	Tours	France	Grand Hall de Tours	—	—
31 March 2014	La Roche-sur-Yon	France	Vendéspace	—	—
1 April 2014	Caen	France	Zénith de Caen	—	—
2 April 2014	Brussels	Belgium	Forest National	7,644 / 8,399	$395,148
4 April 2014	Moscow	Russia	Ray Just Arena	—	—
14 April 2014	Edinburgh	Scotland	Edinburgh Festival Theatre	—	—
15 April 2014	Glasgow	Scotland	Glasgow Royal Concert Hall	—	—
17 April 2014	Manchester	England	O_{2} Apollo Manchester	—	—
18 April 2014	Wolverhampton	England	Wolverhampton Civic Hall	—	—
19 April 2014	London	England	Royal Albert Hall	—	—
20 April 2014	Bournemouth	England	Windsor Hall	—	—
23 April 2014	Montreal	Canada	Centre Bell	5,489 / 6,382	$331,823
25 April 2014	Quebec City	Canada	Colisée Pepsi	3,548 / 4,223	$213,705
26 April 2014	La Baie	Canada	Théâtre du Palais Municipal	2,250 / 2,250	$159,113
27 April 2014	Sherbrooke	Canada	Salle Maurice-O'Bready	1,599 / 1,599	$93,402
29 April 2014	Toronto	Canada	Danforth Music Hall	—	—
30 April 2014	Toronto	Canada	Danforth Music Hall	—	—
2 May 2014	Atlantic City	United States	Borgata Music Box	—	—
3 May 2014	Boston	United States	House of Blues	—	—
5 May 2014	New York City	United States	Webster Hall	—	—
6 May 2014	Englewood	United States	Bergen Performing Arts Center	—	—
8 May 2014	Atlanta	United States	Center Stage Theater	—	—
9 May 2014	Biloxi	United States	Hard Rock Live	—	—
10 May 2014	Houston	United States	House of Blues	—	—
12 May 2014	Englewood	United States	Gothic Theatre	—	—
14 May 2014	San Francisco	United States	The Fillmore	—	—
16 May 2014	West Wendover	United States	Peppermill Concert Hall	—	—
17 May 2014	Reno	United States	Grand Theatre	—	—
18 May 2014	Riverside	United States	Fox Performing Arts Center	—	—
19 May 2014	Los Angeles	United States	Belasco Theatre	—	—
22 May 2014	Papeete	French Polynesia	Place To'ata	—	—
25 May 2014	Païta	New Caledonia	Arène du Sud	—	—
27 May 2014	Wellington	New Zealand	Michael Fowler Centre	—	—
28 May 2014	Auckland	New Zealand	Auckland Civic Theatre	—	—
30 May 2014	Sydney	Australia	State Theatre	—	—
31 May 2014	Sydney	Australia	State Theatre	—	—
1 June 2014	Newcastle	Australia	Newcastle Civic Theatre	—	—
2 June 2014	Brisbane	Australia	BCEC Great Hall	—	—
4 June 2014	Darwin	Australia	DCC Auditorium	—	—
6 June 2014	Adelaide	Australia	AEC Theatre	—	—
7 June 2014	Canberra	Australia	Royal Theatre	—	—
8 June 2014	Melbourne	Australia	Plenary Hall	—	—
10 June 2014	Hobart	Australia	Derwent Entertainment Centre	—	—
12 June 2014	Perth	Australia	Crown Theatre	—	—
13 June 2014	Perth	Australia	Riverside Theatre	—	—
22 June 2014^{[A]}	Wrocław	Poland	Stadion Miejski	—	—
26 June 2014^{[B]}	Pickering	England	Dalby Forest	—	—
27 June 2014^{[C]}	Newmarket	England	Newmarket Racecourse	—	—
29 June 2014	Cardiff	Wales	St David's Hall	—	—
30 June 2014	Bath	England	The Forum	—	—
1 July 2014	Llandudno	Wales	Venue Cymru Arena	—	—
3 July 2014^{[D]}	Epsom	England	Epsom Downs Racecourse	—	—
4 July 2014^{[E]}	Hoghton	England	Hoghton Tower	—	—
5 July 2014^{[F]}	Beltring	England	Hop Farm Country Park	—	—
8 July 2014^{[G]}	Châteauneuf-les-Martigues	France	Parc François Mitterrand	—	—
10 July 2014	Kufstein	Austria	Festung Kufstein	—	—
11 July 2014	Reifnitz	Austria	Festplatz Reifnitz	—	—
12 July 2014	Klam	Austria	Burg Clam	—	—
14 July 2014	Bolzano	Italy	PalaOnda	—	—
15 July 2014	Piazzola sul Brenta	Italy	Anfiteatro Camerini	—	—
16 July 2014^{[H]}	Locarno	Switzerland	Piazza Grande	—	—
19 July 2014^{[I]}	Pori	Finland	Kirjurinluoto Arena	—	—
21 July 2014^{[J]}	Rome	Italy	Auditorium Cavea	—	—
22 July 2014	Mantua	Italy	Piazza Sordello	—	—
23 July 2014^{[K]}	Lucerne	Switzerland	KKL Konzertsaal	—	—
24 July 2014^{[L]}	Regensburg	Germany	Schloss St. Emmeram	—	—
26 July 2014^{[M]}	Nyon	Switzerland	Plaine de l'Asse	—	—
27 July 2014	Taormina	Italy	Teatro Antico di Taormina	—	—
29 July 2014	Vienne	France	Théâtre antique de Vienne	—	—
30 July 2014^{[N]}	Carcassonne	France	Théâtre Jean-Deschamps	—	—
1 August 2014	Beaufort	Luxembourg	Château de Beaufort	—	—
2 August 2014^{[O]}	Dranouter	Belgium	Festivalweide Dranouter	—	—
3 August 2014^{[P]}	Ronquières	Belgium	Plan incliné de Ronquières	—	—
5 August 2014^{[Q]}	Calella de Palafrugell	Spain	Auditori Cap Roig	—	—
7 August 2014^{[R]}	Schwetzingen	Germany	Schwetzinger Schlossgarten	4,920 / 4,920	$279,306
8 August 2014	Dresden	Germany	Freilichtbühne Großer Garten	5,800 / 5,800	$302,438
9 August 2014	Sankt Goarshausen	Germany	Freilichtbühne Loreley	6,800 / 10,000	$369,475
10 August 2014	Halle	Germany	Gerry Weber Stadion	5,295 / 6,441	$287,234
12 August 2014^{[S]}	Colmar	France	Théâtre de Plein Air de Colmar	—	—
14 August 2014^{[T]}	Wickham	England	Wickham Festival Site	—	—
16 August 2014^{[U]}	Doncaster	England	Doncaster Racecourse	—	—
3 October 2014	Warsaw	Poland	Torwar Hall	—	—
5 October 2014	Minsk	Belarus	Palace of the Republic	—	—
6 October 2014	Vilnius	Lithuania	Siemens Arena	—	—
8 October 2014	Stockholm	Sweden	Hovet	3,039 / 5,000	$169,876
10 October 2014	Linköping	Sweden	Cloetta Center	3,532 / 4,000	$223,679
11 October 2014	Malmö	Sweden	Baltiska hallen	2,214 / 3,000	$124,452
12 October 2014	Flensburg	Germany	Flens-Arena	3,528 / 3,740	$187,495
14 October 2014	Dortmund	Germany	Westfalenhallen	5,076 / 8,793	$255,554
15 October 2014	Bamburgh	Germany	Brose Arena	5,048 / 5,181	$263,620
17 October 2014	Augsburg	Germany	Schwabenhalle	4,243 / 4,243	$218,464
18 October 2014	Freiburg im Breisgau	Germany	Rothaus Arena	4,285 / 6,238	$225,848
19 October 2014	Karlsruhe	Germany	dm Arena	4,221 / 6,248	$244,566
21 October 2014	Bremen	Germany	ÖVB Arena	4,290 / 8,766	$234,367
22 October 2014	Braunschweig	Germany	Volkswagen Halle	4,847 / 6,089	$267,872
23 October 2014	Ulm	Germany	Ratiopharm Arena	3,442 / 5,310	$184,043
26 October 2014	Graz	Austria	Stadthalle Graz	3,442 / 5,310	$184,043
27 October 2014	Budapest	Hungary	László Papp Budapest Sports Arena	—	—
28 October 2014	Bratislava	Slovakia	Aegon Arena	—	—
29 October 2014	Karlovy Vary	Czech Republic	KV Arena	—	—
31 October 2014^{[V]}	Cluj-Napoca	Romania	Sala Polivalentă	—	—
7 November 2014	Monte Carlo	Monaco	Salle des Étoiles	—	—
9 November 2014	Oslo	Norway	Sentrum Scene	—	—
11 November 2014	Aalborg	Denmark	Aalborghallen	—	—
13 November 2014	San Sebastián	Spain	Auditorio Kursaal Donostia	—	—
14 November 2014	Barcelona	Spain	Palau dels Esports de Barcelona	—	—
15 November 2014	Madrid	Spain	Teatro Circo Price	—	—
16 November 2014	Lisbon	Portugal	Coliseu dos Recreios	—	—
20 November 2014	Dublin	Ireland	The O_{2}	—	—
22 November 2014	Nottingham	England	Capital FM Arena Nottingham	—	—
23 November 2014	Birmingham	England	National Indoor Arena	—	—
24 November 2014	Leeds	England	First Direct Arena	—	—
26 November 2014	Liverpool	England	Echo Arena Liverpool	—	—
27 November 2014	Bournemouth	England	Windsor Hall	—	—
28 November 2014	Brighton	England	Brighton Centre	—	—
29 November 2014^{[W]}	Ischgl	Austria	Silvrettaseilbahn AG	—	—
1 December 2014	London	England	Eventim Apollo	—	—

List of 2015 concerts
Date	City	Country	Venue	Attendance	Revenue
7 February 2015	Tel Aviv	Israel	Menora Mivtachim Arena	—	—
11 February 2015	Cape Town	South Africa	Grand Arena at GrandWest Casino	7,382 / 7,416	$300,336
12 February 2015	Cape Town	South Africa	Grand Arena at GrandWest Casino	7,382 / 7,416	$300,336
14 February 2015	Boksburg	South Africa	Big Top Arena at Carnival City	6,654 / 6,944	$251,299
15 February 2015	Boksburg	South Africa	Big Top Arena at Carnival City	6,654 / 6,944	$251,299
17 February 2015	Harare	Zimbabwe	HICC Auditorium	—	—
20 February 2015	Saint-Denis	Réunion	Petit Stade de L'Est	—	—
22 February 2015	Port Louis	Mauritius	SVICC Main Hall	—	—
25 February 2015^{[X]}	Dubai	United Arab Emirates	Dubai Media City Amphitheatre	—	—
27 February 2015	Istanbul	Turkey	Ülker Sports Arena	—	—
11 March 2015	São Paulo	Brazil	Estádio Rua Javari	—	—
13 March 2015	Asunción	Paraguay	Court Central del Yacht y Golf Club	—	—
15 March 2015	Buenos Aires	Argentina	Estadio Luna Park	—	—
17 March 2015	Lima	Peru	Anfiteatro del Parque de la Exposición	—	—
19 March 2015	Quito	Ecuador	Ágora de la Casa de la Cultura	—	—
20 March 2015	Bogotá	Colombia	Teatro Royal Center	—	—
22 March 2015	Santiago	Chile	Movistar Arena	—	—
TOTAL				234,042 / 268,690 (87%)	$12,741,442

Festivals and other miscellaneous performances

^{A} wRomantic Festival
^{B} Forest Live
^{C} Adnams Newmarket Night
^{D} Epsom Live
^{E} Symphony at The Tower
^{F} Hop Farm Festival
^{G} Sous les Pins
^{H} Moon and Stars
^{I} Pori Jazz
^{J} Luglio Suona Bene
^{K} Blue Balls Festival
^{L} Thurn-und-Taxis-Schlossfestspiele
^{M} Paléo Festival
^{N} Festival de Carcassonne
^{O} Festival Dranouter
^{P} Ronquières Festival
^{Q} Festival Jardins de Cap Roig
^{R} Musik im Park
^{S} Foire aux vins d'Alsace
^{T} Wickham Festival
^{U} Music Live! Racedays
^{V} Festivalul Internaţional de Muzică şi Artă Transilvania
^{W} Top of the Mountain Concert
^{X} Emirates Airline Dubai Jazz Festival

Cancellations and rescheduled shows

12 May 2014	Denver, Colorado	Ogden Theatre	Moved to the Gothic Theatre in Englewood, Colorado
17 May 2014	West Wendover, Nevada	Peppermill Concert Hall	Rescheduled to 16 May 2014
10 July 2014	Wiesen, Austria	Ottakringer Arena	Cancelled. Was a part of "Two Days a Week"
