= Hoodi metro station =

Namma Metro's Purple Line metro station

Hoodi
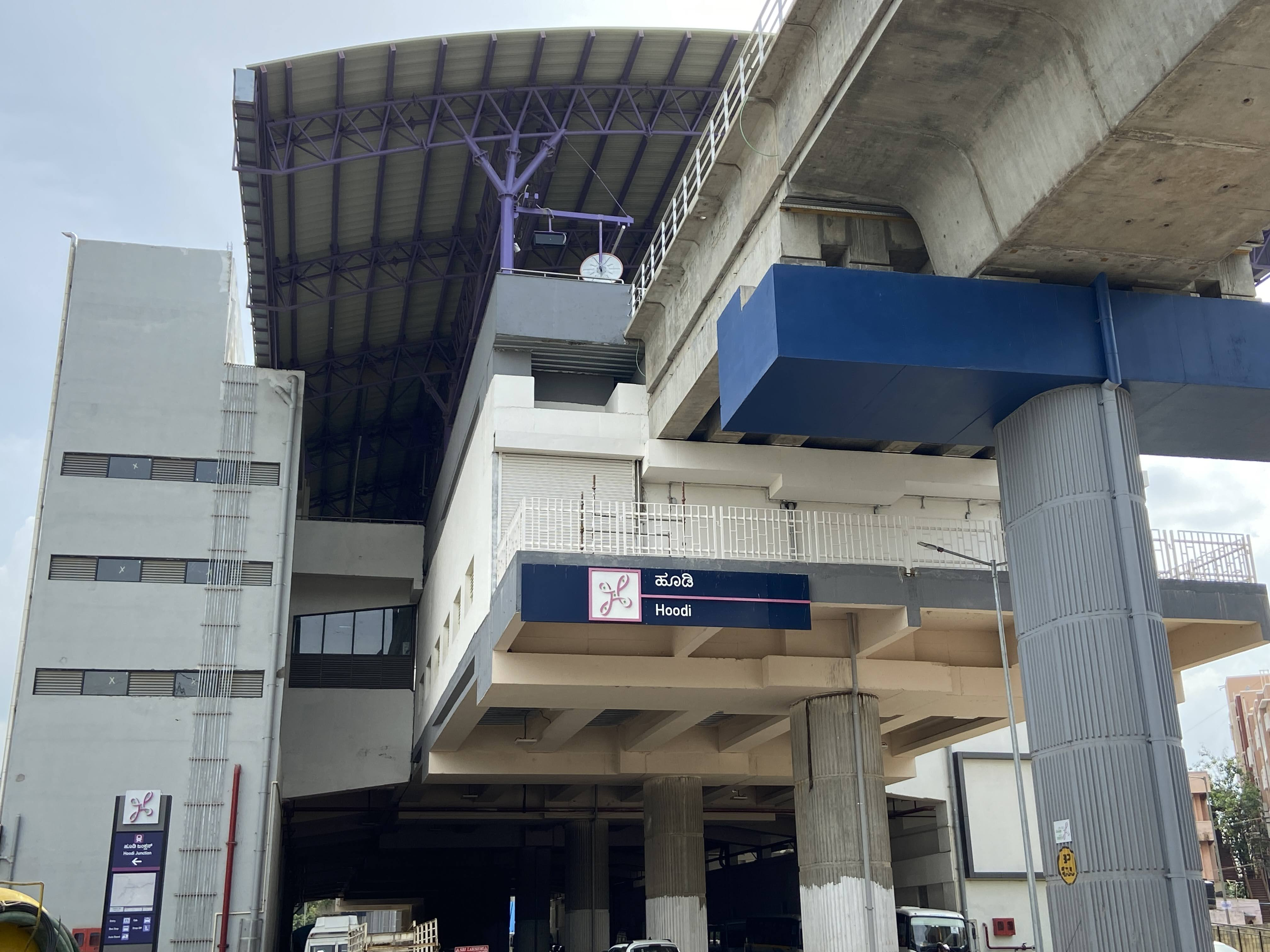
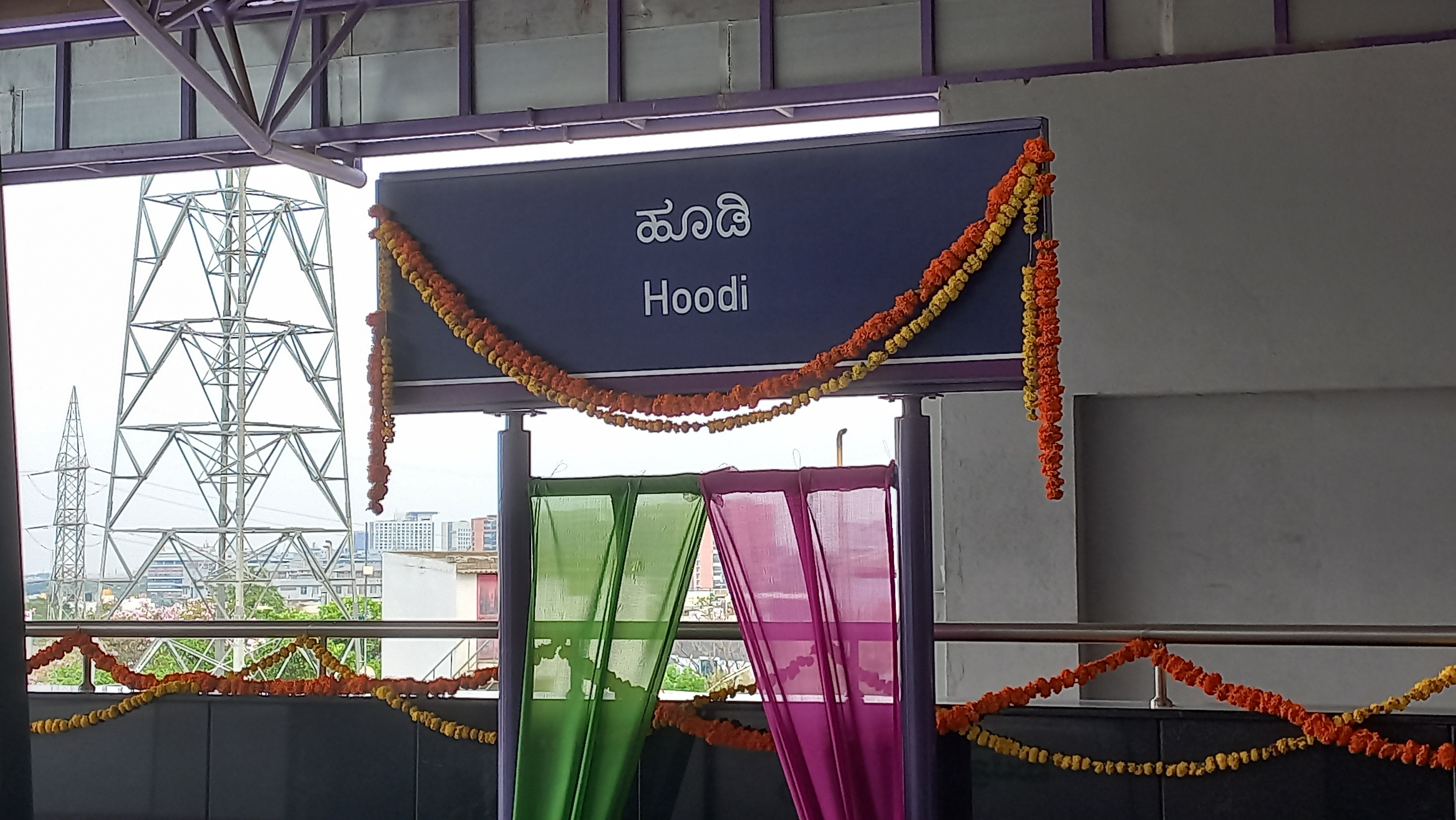

General information
- Other names: Hoodi Junction
- Location: Hoodi Main Rd, near Godrej Air Nxt, Seetharampalya, Hoodi, Bengaluru, Karnataka 560048
- Coordinates: 12.98873°N 77.71127°E
- System: Namma Metro station
- Owner: Bangalore Metro Rail Corporation Ltd (BMRCL)
- Operator: Namma Metro
- Line: Purple Line
- Platforms: Side platform Platform-1 → Whitefield (Kadugodi); Platform-2 → Challaghatta
- Tracks: 2
- Connections: Hoodi Halt

Construction
- Structure type: Elevated, Double track
- Platform levels: 2
- Parking: Two Wheelers
- Accessible: Yes
- Architect: ITD - ITD Cementation India JV

Other information
- Status: Staffed
- Station code: DKIA

History
- Opened: 26 March 2023; 3 years ago
- Electrified: 750 V DC third rail

Services
Preceding station	Namma Metro	Following station
Seetharamapalya towards Whitefield (Kadugodi)	Purple Line	Garudacharpalya towards Challaghatta
Route map
Location

Hoodi (formerly known as Hoodi Junction) is an elevated metro station on the East-West corridor of the Purple Line of Namma Metro in Bengaluru, India which holds the main Hoodi neighbourhood area. The station is located near SR Enterprises, Skylark Esta Apt Complex, MacPro Technologies and many more.

The Whitefield - Krishnarajapura trial runs were successfully conducted from 25 October for a month. This metro station was inaugurated on 25 March 2023 by Prime Minister Narendra Modi and opened to the public on 26 March 2023.

== Station layout ==
G	Street level	Exit/Entrance
L1	Mezzanine	Fare control, station agent, Metro Card vending machines, crossover
L2	Side platform | Doors will open on the left
L2	Platform 1 Eastbound	Towards → Whitefield (Kadugodi); Next station: Seetharamapalya
L2	Platform 2 Westbound	Towards ← Challaghatta; Next station: Garudacharpalya
L2	Side platform | Doors will open on the left
L2

== Entry/Exit ==
There are 2 Entry/Exit points - A and B. Commuters can use either of the points for their travel.

== See also ==
- Hoodi
- Bangalore
- List of Namma Metro stations
- Transport in Karnataka
- List of metro systems
- List of rapid transit systems in India
- Bangalore Metropolitan Transport Corporation
