= Bartender (disambiguation) =

A bartender is one who serves beverages behind a bar at a drinking or dining establishment.

Bartender may also refer to:

- Bartender (manga), a 2004 Japanese manga series
- "Bartender", a 2000 single by Hed PE from Broke
- "Bartender" (Dave Matthews Band song), 2002
- "Bartender" (T-Pain song), 2007
- "Bartender Song (Sittin' at a Bar)", a 2008 song by Rehab
- "Bartender" (Lady Antebellum song), 2014
- "Bartender" (James Blunt song), 2017
- "Bartender" (Lana Del Rey song), 2019
- BarTender, a barcode labeling software suite by Seagull Scientific
