= Garudacharpalya metro station =

Namma Metro's Purple Line metro station

Garudacharpalya
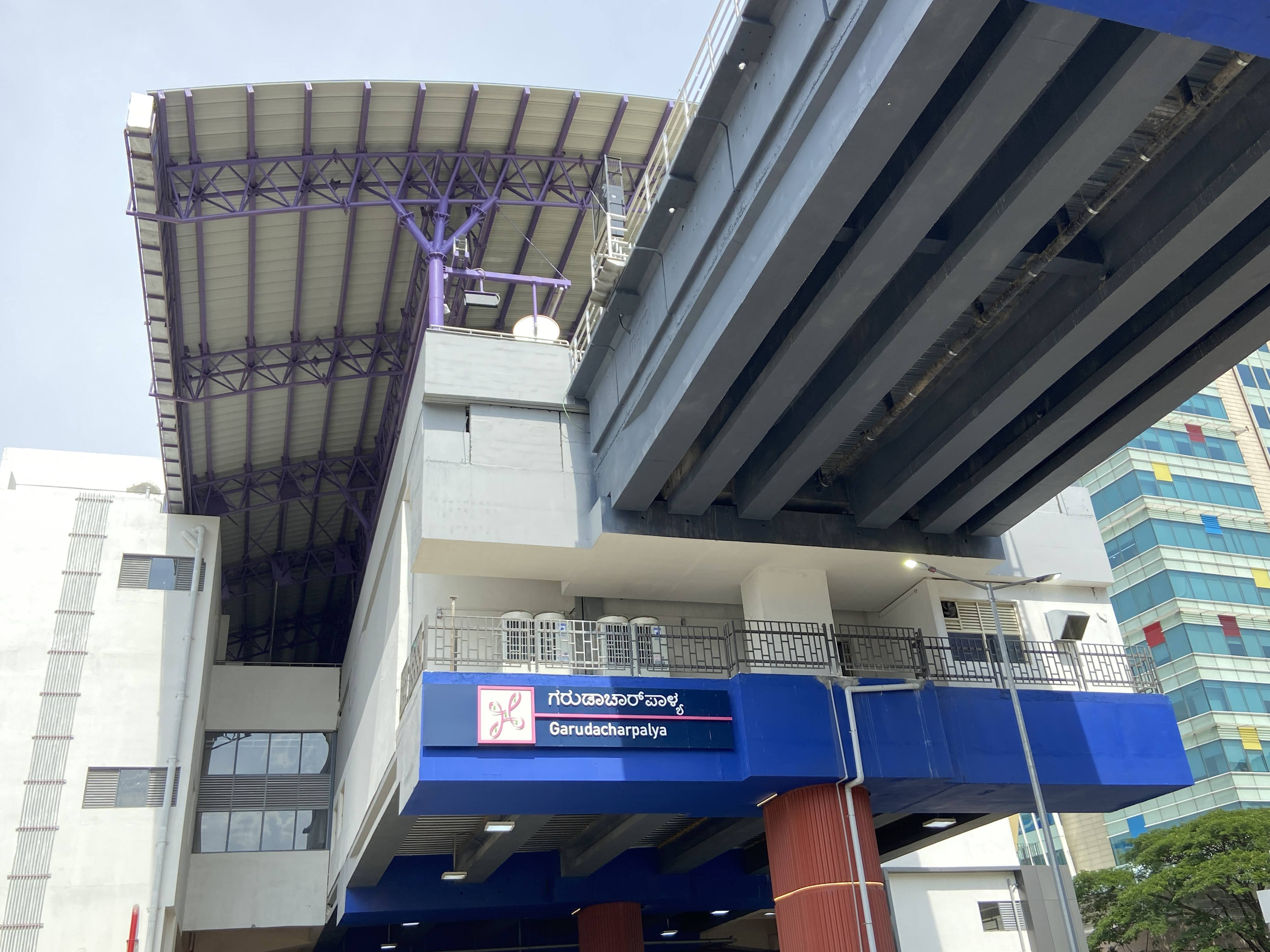
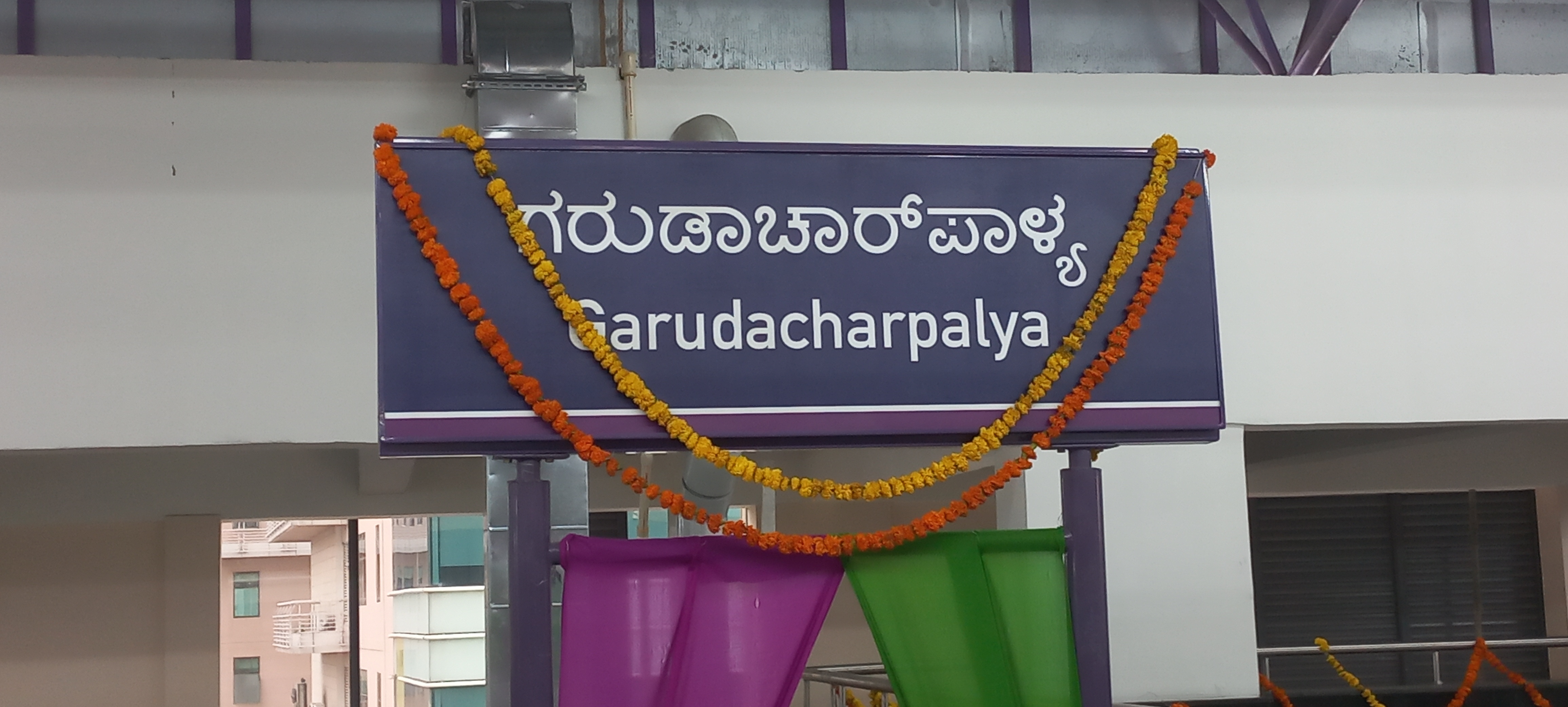
- Garudacharpalya metro station

General information
- Location: Whitefield Main Road, Hoodi, Bengaluru, Karnataka 560066
- Coordinates: 12.99356°N 77.70376°E
- System: Namma Metro station
- Owner: Bangalore Metro Rail Corporation Ltd (BMRCL)
- Operator: Namma Metro
- Line: Purple Line
- Platforms: Side platform Platform-1 → Whitefield (Kadugodi); Platform-2 → Challaghatta
- Tracks: 2

Construction
- Structure type: Elevated, Double track
- Platform levels: 2
- Parking: Two Wheelers
- Accessible: Yes
- Architect: ITD - ITD Cementation India JV

Other information
- Status: Staffed
- Station code: GDCP

History
- Opened: 26 March 2023; 3 years ago
- Electrified: 750 V DC third rail

Services
Preceding station	Namma Metro	Following station
Hoodi towards Whitefield (Kadugodi)	Purple Line	Singayyanapalya towards Challaghatta
Route map
Location

Garudacharpalya is an elevated metro station on the East-West corridor of the Purple Line of Namma Metro in Bengaluru, India. Around this station holds the Brigade Metropolis followed by some locations like Godrej United, Decathlon Whitefield, Airbus Group India Pvt. Ltd., IDP Education Pvt. Ltd. and many more.

The Whitefield - Krishnarajapura trial runs were successfully conducted from 25 October 2022, for a month. This metro station was inaugurated on March 25, 2023 by Prime Minister Narendra Modi and was opened to the public on March 26, 2023.

Garudacharpalya is the receiving terminus for the short-loop train system that runs between it and Mysuru Road in the mornings (approximately between 7:45 am and 9:00 am). During peak travel hours in the morning and evening (approximately 7 am to 11 am and 4 pm to 8 pm), it functions as a terminus for trains with a frequency of about 5 minutes. This is done to ease congestion in the stretches of the Purple Line that most commuters travel between.

The stretch between Garudacharpalya and Hoodi is one of the longer gaps in the Purple Line, with an approximate distance of 1.6 km. For context, the Purple Line has 37 stations and an end-to-end distance of 43.5 km, implying an average gap of 1.2 km between stations.

== Station layout ==
G	Street level	Exit/Entrance
L1	Mezzanine	Fare control, station agent, Metro Card vending machines, crossover
L2	Side Platform | Doors will open on the left
L2	Platform 1 Eastbound	Towards → Whitefield (Kadugodi); Next Station: Hoodi
L2	Platform 2 Westbound	Towards ← Nadaprabhu Kempegowda Stn, Majestic / Challaghatta; Next Station: Singayyanapalya
L2	Side Platform | Doors will open on the left
L2	Note:	(Towards Majestic - Operational during peak hours)

== Entry/Exit ==
There are 2 Entry/Exit points — A and B. Commuters can use either of the points for their travel.

- Entry/Exit point A - Towards Gopalan National School, Hoodi side
- Entry/Exit point B - Towards Brigade Metropolis, Phoenix mall, Tin factory side

== See also ==
- Bangalore
- List of Namma Metro stations
- Transport in Karnataka
- List of metro systems
- List of rapid transit systems in India
- Bangalore Metropolitan Transport Corporation
