= When I Find Love Again =

Single by James Blunt

from the album Moon Landing (Apollo Edition)
- Released: 16 September 2014
- Recorded: 2011−13
- Genre: Pop rock; folk-pop
- Length: 3:05
- Label: Atlantic Records
- Songwriters: Steve Mac; Benjamin Levin; Ammar Malik; Daniel Omelio; Ross Golan; Charlotte Aitchison
- Producers: Steve Mac; Benny Blanco; Robopop

James Blunt singles chronology
"Postcards" (2014)	"When I Find Love Again" (2014)	"Love Me Better" (2017)

Music video
- "When I Find Love Again" on YouTube

"When I Find Love Again" is a song recorded by English singer-songwriter James Blunt. It was released on 16 September 2014, as the lead single from the "Apollo Edition" of his fourth studio album, Moon Landing (2013). The song was written by Ammar Malik, Ross Golan, and Charli XCX with its producers Steve Mac, Benny Blanco, and Robopop.

== Track listing ==
Digital download
No.	Title	Length
1.	"When I Find Love Again"	3:05

== Charts ==
=== Weekly charts ===
Chart (2014)	Peak position
Australia (ARIA)	27
Austria (Ö3 Austria Top 40)	44
Belgium (Ultratip Bubbling Under Flanders)	12
Belgium (Ultratip Bubbling Under Wallonia)	5
Germany (GfK)	78
Hungary (Rádiós Top 40)	6
Hungary (Single Top 40)	18
Slovenia (SloTop50)	49
Switzerland (Schweizer Hitparade)	59
UK Singles (Official Charts)	78

=== Year-end charts ===
Chart (2014)	Position
Hungary (Rádiós Top 40)	68

== Release history ==
Region	Date	Format	Label
United Kingdom	16 September 2014	Digital download	Atlantic Records
