= Phoenix Marketcity (Chennai) =

Shopping mall in Chennai, India

Phoenix Marketcity Chennai
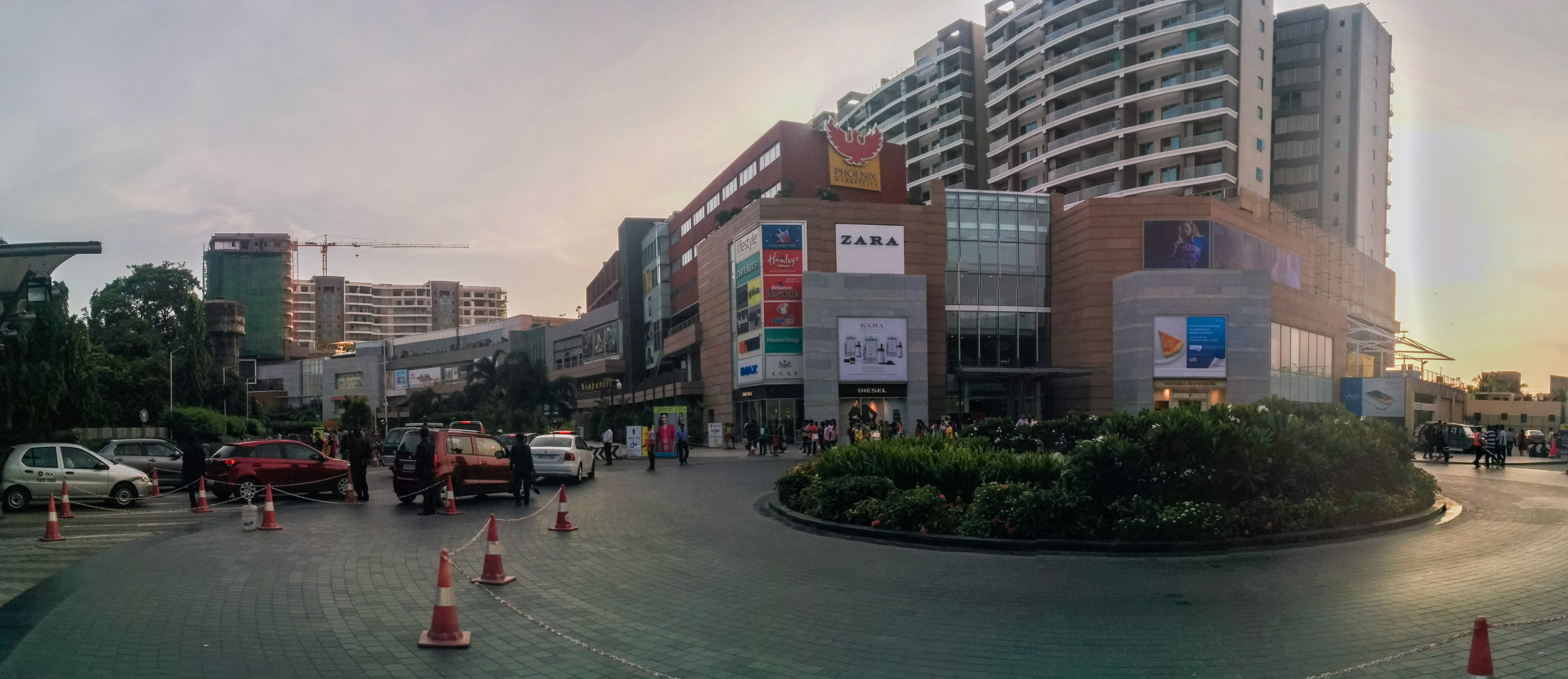
- Location: Velachery, Chennai, Tamil Nadu, India
- Coordinates: 12.99°N 80.21°E
- Address: 142, Velachery Main Road
- Opened: January 2013
- Architect: Benoy
- Num. of stores: 263+
- Num. of anchor tenants: 4
- Floor area: 1,000,000 sq ft (93,000 m^{2})
- Floors: 4 floors, including 1 basement shopping floor
- Parking: Basement & MLCP
- Website: www.phoenixmarketcity.com/chennai

Phoenix Marketcity is a shopping mall developed by Phoenix Mills Limited located in Chennai, Tamil Nadu, India. It was opened in January 2013 and is the 2nd largest mall in the city. It was the fourth largest mall in India in 2018.

It has a built up area of 1,000,000 square feet. Also there is a Palladium mall situated right next to it.

== About ==
This mall was jointly developed by Phoenix Mills Limited and Crest Ventures Ltd. Phoenix Mall Chennai is part of a development which includes a premium residential space as part of Phase I. Phase II development includes a luxury mall called Palladium and residential space.

== Entertainment ==
- Phoenix Mall features an 11-screen multiplex which is also Chennai's first IMAX screen.

== Palladium ==
Palladium, the first luxury and premium luxury retail and entertainment destination of Chennai, was launched alongside Phoenix Marketcity as its second branch in the country after the Mumbai one. It is also located in the same compound. Palladium Chennai has a leasable area of 220,000 square feet (20,000 m^{2}) and 86 stores as of now.

== Gallery ==
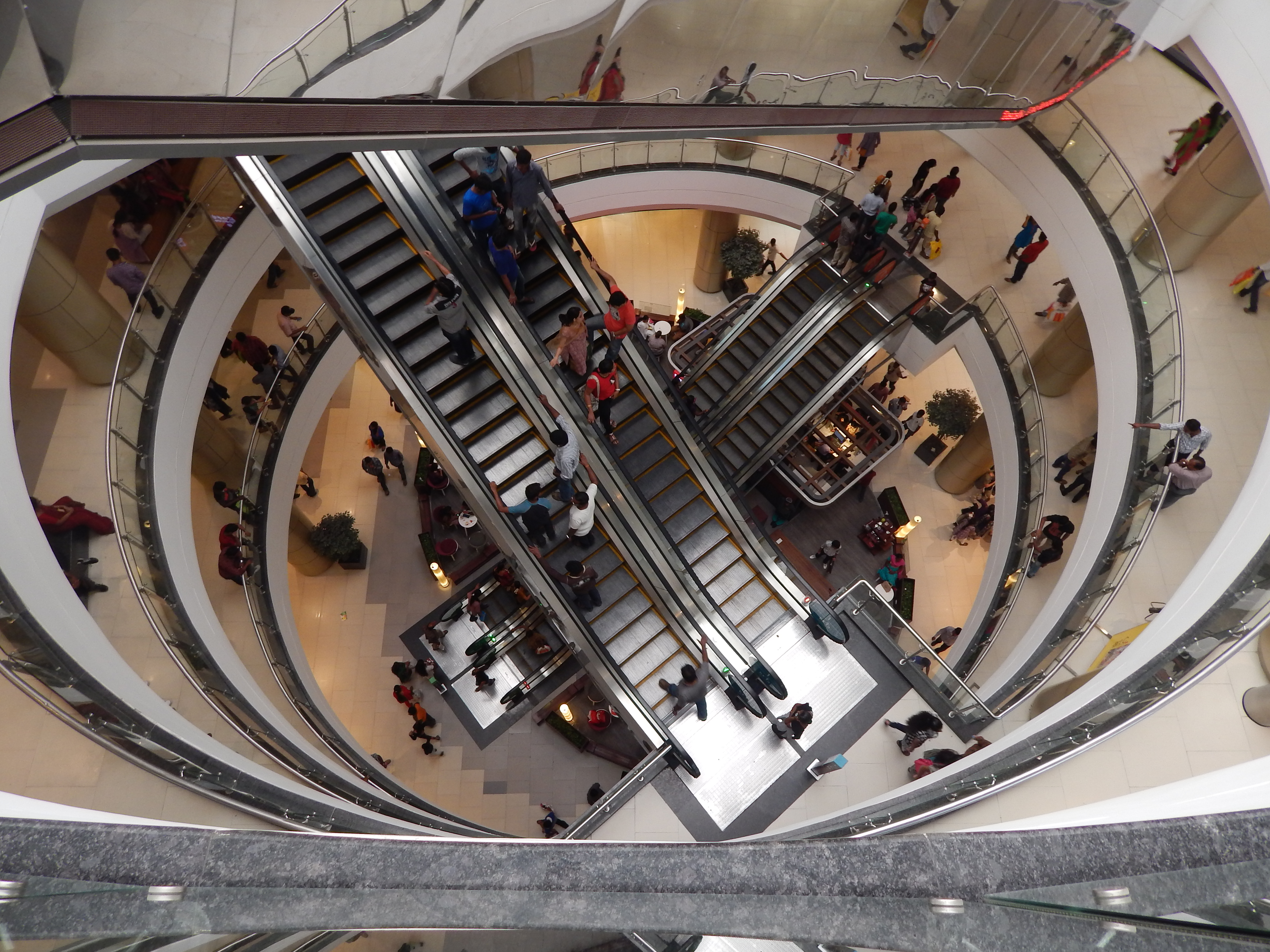
Inside view of Phoenix Market City, Chennai

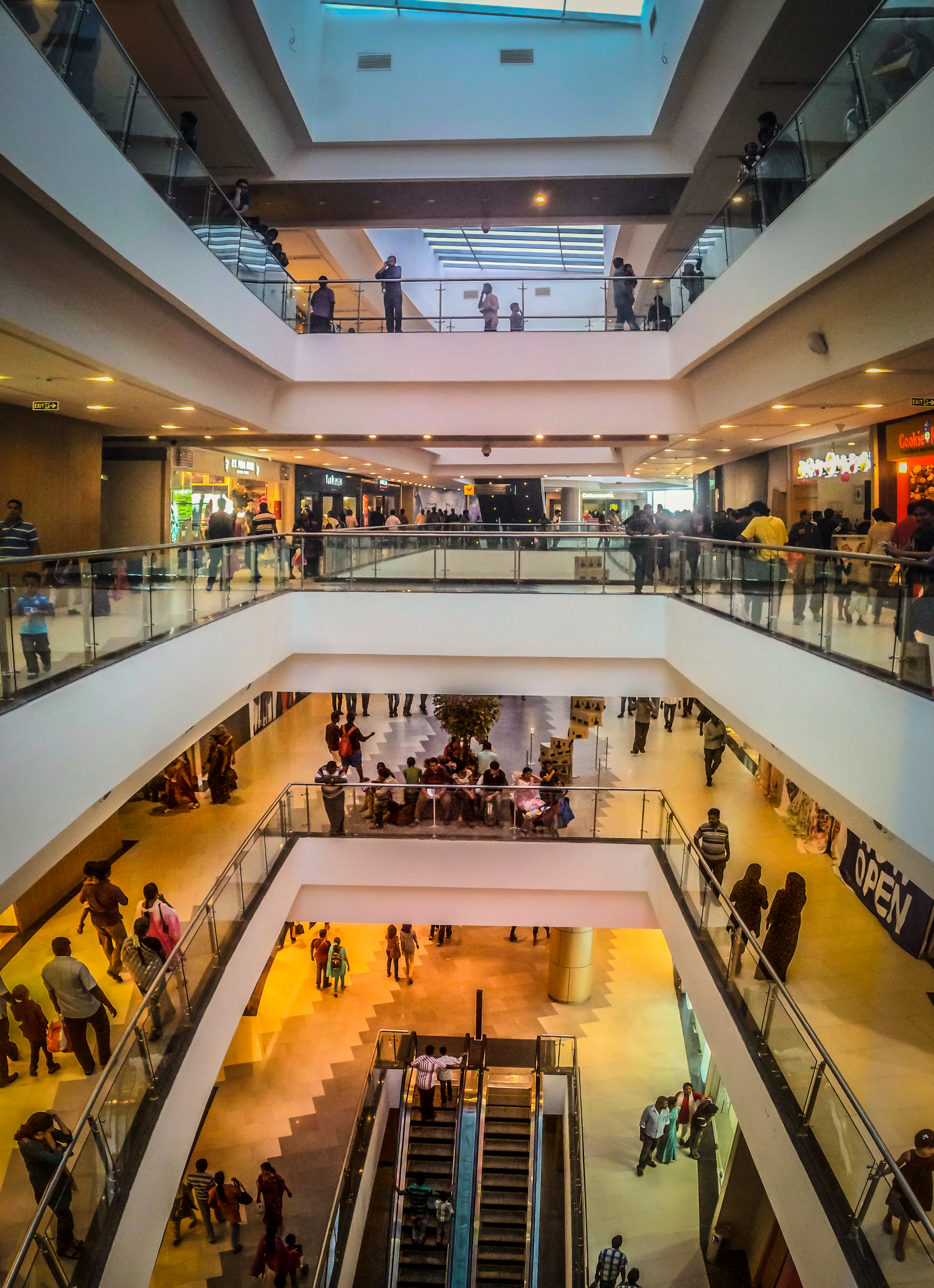
Interior view of Phoenix Market City (Chennai)

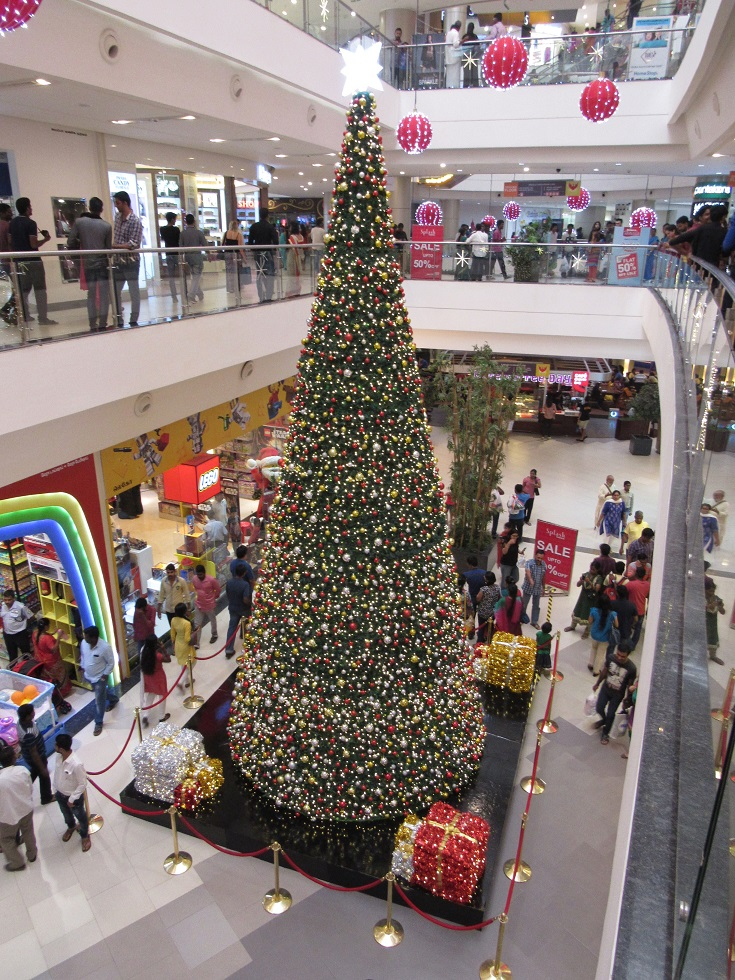
Christmas tree in Phoenix Market City

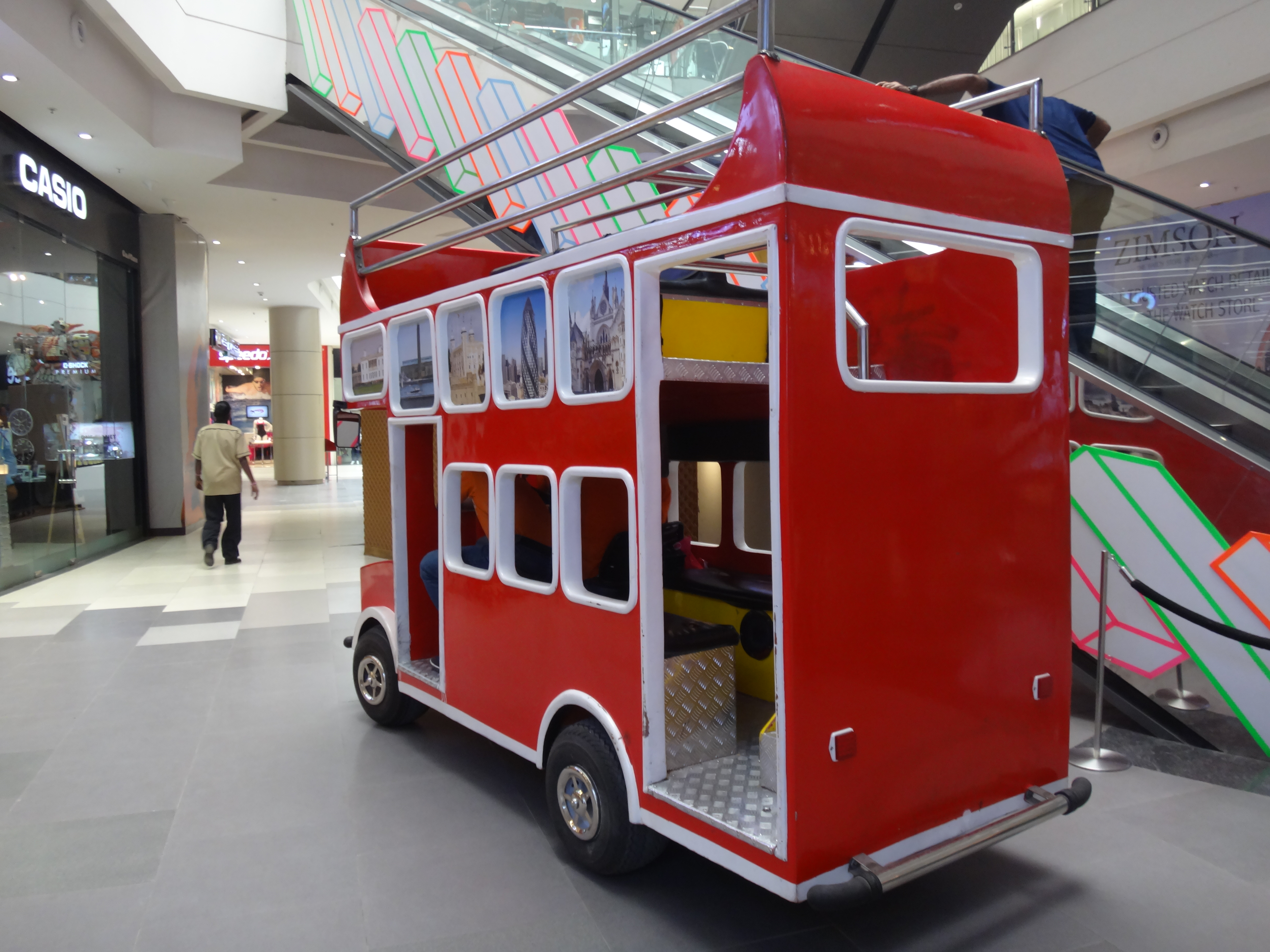
Model of a London Bus inside the Mall.

== See also ==
- Phoenix Market City (Bangalore)
- High Street Phoenix
- List of shopping malls in India
