= Singayyanapalya metro station =

Namma Metro's Purple Line metro station

Singayyanapalya
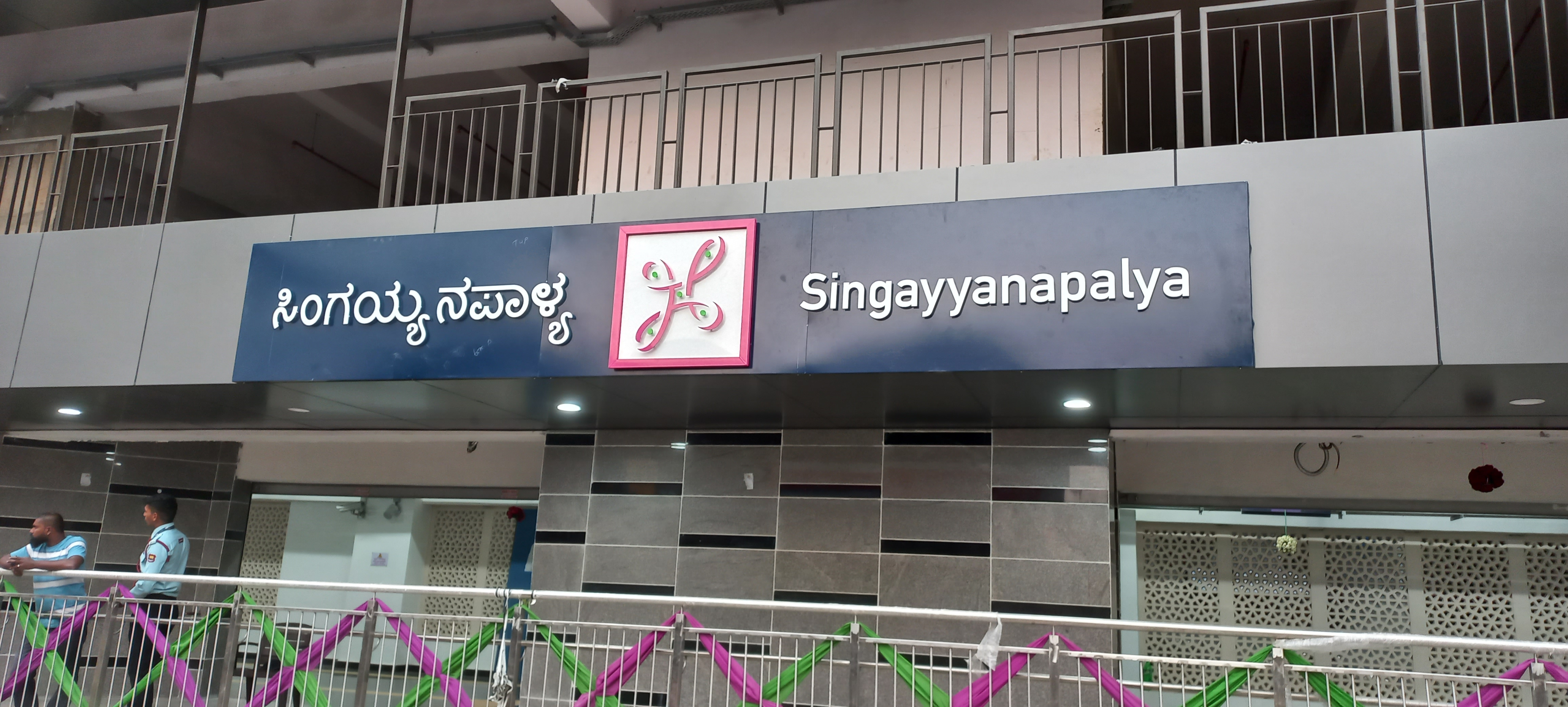
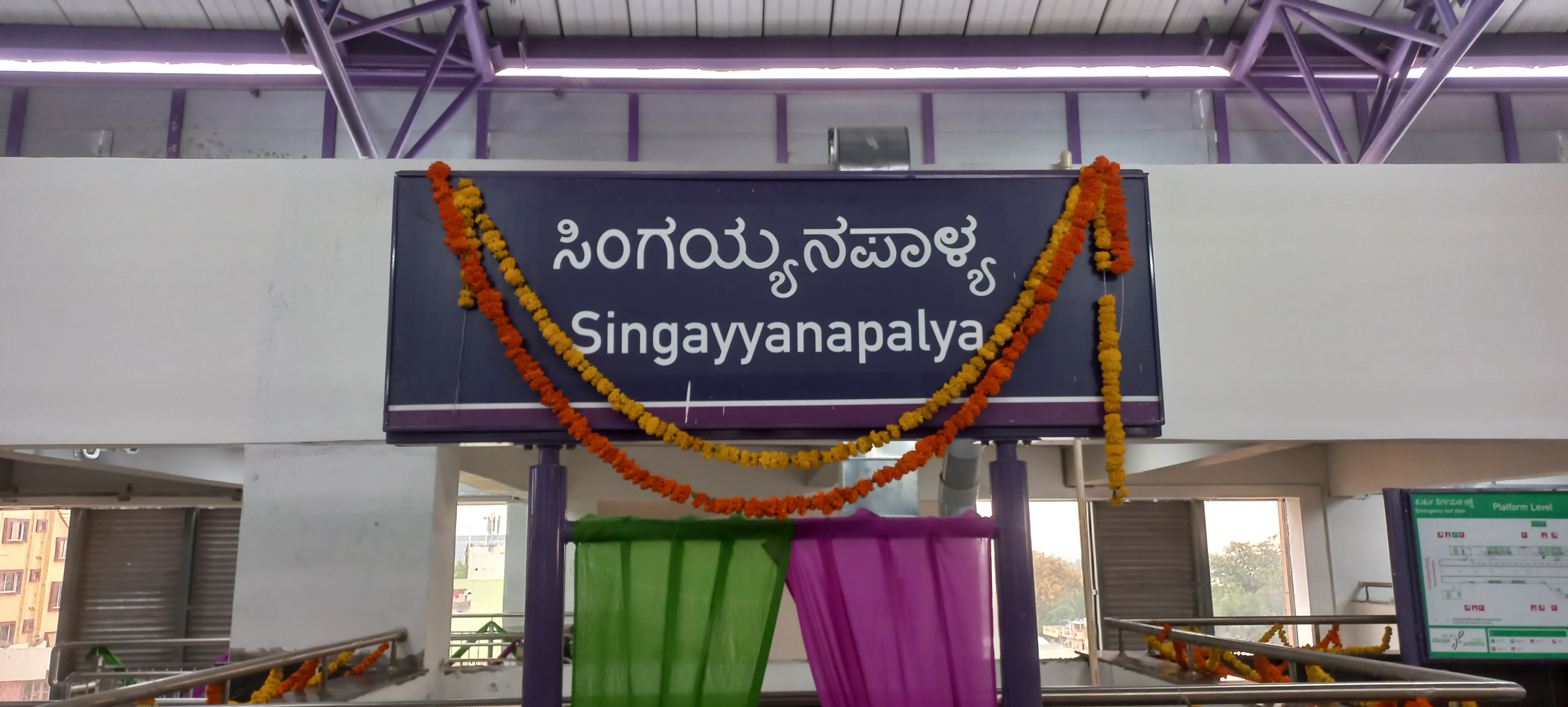
- Singayyanapalya metro station

General information
- Other names: Mahadevapura
- Location: Whitefield Main Rd, Maheswari Nagar, B Narayanapura, Mahadevapura, Bengaluru, Karnataka 560048
- Coordinates: 12.99678°N 77.69217°E
- System: Namma Metro station
- Owner: Bangalore Metro Rail Corporation Ltd (BMRCL)
- Operator: Namma Metro
- Line: Purple Line
- Platforms: Side platform Platform-1 → Whitefield (Kadugodi); Platform-2 → Challaghatta
- Tracks: 2

Construction
- Structure type: Elevated, Double track
- Platform levels: 2
- Parking: Two Wheelers
- Accessible: Yes
- Architect: ITD - ITD Cementation India JV

Other information
- Status: Staffed
- Station code: MDVP

History
- Opened: 26 March 2023; 3 years ago
- Electrified: 750 V DC third rail

Services
Preceding station	Namma Metro	Following station
Garudacharpalya towards Whitefield (Kadugodi)	Purple Line	Krishnarajapura towards Challaghatta
Route map
Location

Singayyanapalya (formerly known as Mahadevapura) is an elevated metro station on the East-West corridor of the Purple Line of Namma Metro in Bengaluru, India. This station is located near the Hindustan Petroleum Corporation Ltd., Phoenix Marketcity, VR Bengaluru, Exxonmobil Lubricants Pvt. Ltd., DTDC office and many more.

The Whitefield - Krishnarajapura trial runs were successfully conducted from 25 October 2022 for a month. This metro station was inaugurated on March 25, 2023 by Prime Minister Narendra Modi and was opened to the public on March 26, 2023.

The stretch between Singayyanapalya and Krishnarajapura is one of the longer gaps in the Purple Line, with an approximate distance of 1.75 km. For context, the Purple Line has 37 stations and an end-to-end distance of 43.5 km, implying an average gap of 1.2 km between stations. This was because there was originally planned to be another station (Narayanapura) between the two, the cancellation of which prompted the Krishnarajapura metro to be moved approximately 300 metres westward, towards Singayyanapalya.

== Station layout ==
G	Street level	Exit/Entrance
L1	Mezzanine	Fare control, station agent, Metro Card vending machines, crossover
L2	Side Platform | Doors will open on the left
L2	Platform 1 Eastbound	Towards → Whitefield (Kadugodi); Next Station: Garudacharpalya
L2	Platform 2 Westbound	Towards ← Challaghatta; Next Station: Krishnarajapura; Change at the next station for Blue Line
L2	Side Platform | Doors will open on the left
L2

== Entry/Exit ==
There are 2 Entry/Exit points - A and B. Commuters can use either of the points for their travel.

- Entry/Exit point A - Towards Mahadevapura Police Station side
- Entry/Exit point B - Towards Maheshwari Nagar side

== See also ==
- Mahadevapura, Bangalore
- Bangalore
- List of Namma Metro stations
- Transport in Karnataka
- List of metro systems
- List of rapid transit systems in India
- Bangalore Metropolitan Transport Corporation
