= The Afterlove =

Studio album by James Blunt
- Released: 24 March 2017
- Recorded: September 2016 – January 2017
- Genre: Pop, Dance
- Length: 36:31
- Label: Atlantic UK
- Producer: Ryan Tedder; Ed Sheeran; Zach Skelton; Andrew DeRoberts; Teddy Geiger; Daniel Parker; Stephan Moccio; Jay Paul Bicknell (additional prod.); Steve Robson; Martin Terefe

James Blunt chronology
Moon Landing (2013)	The Afterlove (2017)	Once Upon a Mind (2019)

Singles from The Afterlove
- 1. "Love Me Better" Released: 27 January 2017; 2. "Bartender" Released: 10 March 2017

The Afterlove is the fifth studio album by English singer James Blunt, released on 24 March 2017 through Atlantic Records. To promote the album, Blunt embarked on The Afterlove World Tour in August 2017.

== Background ==
On 23 January 2017, Blunt posted a video clip on his Twitter to announce The Afterlove, with the caption "Check out my 12 inch..." In the clip, Blunt appeared naked from the waist up in his bathtub, promising to show fans "something huge", with the camera then panning down to him holding a 12-inch copy of the album. Blunt recorded the album between 2015 and 2016 before it was finished in early 2017.

== Critical reception ==
Professional ratings
Aggregate scores
Source	Rating
Metacritic	54/100
Review scores
Source	Rating
AllMusic	4/5 stars
Financial Times	3/5 stars
The Guardian	2/5 stars
The Irish Times	2/5 stars
London Evening Standard	2/5 stars
The Times	2/5 stars

At Metacritic, which assigns a normalised rating out of 100 to reviews from mainstream critics, The Afterlove received an average score of 54 based on 4 reviews. Neil Z. Yeung from AllMusic gave the album a positive four-star review, writing: "The Afterlove is a brave bid for contemporary relevance in 2017, a wonderful step outside his [Blunt's] comfort zone that is more memorable and exciting than much of his output this decade." Ludovic Hunter-Tilney from the Financial Times gave a positive three-star review and called the songs "carefully structured", with "appealing melodies, on-trend chart pop production and A-list collaborators (including Sheeran) [that] attest to Blunt's musical staying power."

Richard Godwin of the London Evening Standard gave a mixed two-star review, summarising that "[t]he self-deprecating singer songwriter has not lost his way with sentiment" and that the album "finds the former soldier renovating his balladry by means of an R'n'B filter and a few tricks learned from his label-mate: judicious use of auto-tune, choppy guitar grooves and disarming honesty." Godwin also called "Bartender" "catchier than the common cold." Rachel Aroesti of The Guardian gave a negative two-star review, calling the album "[s]lightly desperate and actively risible." Although labelling the lyrics "inoffensive", Aroesti went on to write: "with Blunt having adopted a watered-down version of Justin Bieber's asinine tropical house it smacks of a desire to edge on to Radio 1 playlists and into student nights incognito, but only serves to highlight how irritating the sound has become."

== Singles ==
The first single from the album, "Love Me Better", debuted at number 93 on the UK Singles Chart. The second single, "Bartender", was released on 10 March 2017 along with an accompanying music video.

=== Promotional singles ===
"Time of Our Lives" was released on 14 February 2017 as a promotional single for Valentine's Day. This was followed by the release of "Make Me Better" on 2 March 2017.

== Track listing ==
No.	Title	Writer(s)	Producer(s)	Length
1.	"Love Me Better"	James Blunt; Ryan Tedder; Zach Skelton	Tedder; Skelton	3:38
2.	"Bartender"	Blunt, Teddy Geiger, Steph Jones, Daniel Parker	Teddy Geiger, Daniel Parker	3:13
3.	"Lose My Number"	Blunt, Tedder, Skelton	Tedder, Skelton	3:28
4.	"Don't Give Me Those Eyes"	Blunt, Maureen McDonald, Stephan Moccio	Stephan Moccio	3:44
5.	"Someone Singing Along"	Blunt, Steve Robson, Emily Warren	Steve Robson	3:33
6.	"California"	Blunt, McDonald, Moccio	Moccio, Jay Paul Bicknell (additional prod.)	3:20
7.	"Make Me Better"	Blunt, Johnny McDaid, Ed Sheeran	Sheeran	3:52
8.	"Time of Our Lives"	Blunt, Sheeran, Tedder	Andrew DeRoberts, Tedder	4:30
9.	"Heartbeat"	Blunt, Robson, Dewain Whitmore	Robson	3:21
10.	"Paradise"	Blunt, Amy Wadge	Martin Terefe	3:32

Extended version bonus tracks
No.	Title	Writer(s)	Producer(s)	Length
11.	"Courtney's Song"	Blunt, McDaid	Terefe	4:26
12.	"2005"	Blunt, Steve Mac, Wadge	Terefe	4:05
13.	"Over"	Blunt, Parker, John Geiger II	Geiger, Parker	4:14
14.	"Love Me Better" (music video) (iTunes version only)			3:40
15.	"OK" (Robin Schulz featuring James Blunt)	Blunt, Robin Schulz, Mac, MoZella	Schulz	3:09

== Charts ==
=== Weekly charts ===
Chart (2017–18)	Peak position
Australian Albums (ARIA)	7
Austrian Albums (Ö3 Austria)	7
Belgian Albums (Ultratop Flanders)	17
Belgian Albums (Ultratop Wallonia)	8
Canadian Albums (Billboard)	6
Dutch Albums (Album Top 100)	10
French Albums (SNEP)	14
German Albums (Offizielle Top 100)	6
Hungarian Albums (MAHASZ)	4
Irish Albums (IRMA)	7
Italian Albums (FIMI)	10
New Zealand Albums (RMNZ)	13
Scottish Albums (OCC)	4
Spanish Albums (PROMUSICAE)	19
Swiss Albums (Schweizer Hitparade)	4
UK Albums (OCC)	6
US Billboard 200	177
US Top Album Sales (Billboard)	66

=== Year-end charts ===
Chart (2017)	Position
Australian Albums (ARIA)	79
Belgian Albums (Ultratop Wallonia)	82
Swiss Albums (Schweizer Hitparade)	40

== Certifications ==
Region	Certification	Certified units/sales
United Kingdom (BPI)	Gold	100,000^{‡}
^{‡} Sales+streaming figures based on certification alone.
