= Hoodi Halt railway station =

Railway station in Karnataka, India

Hoodi Halt Hūḍi Nilugaḍe Hudee Padaav
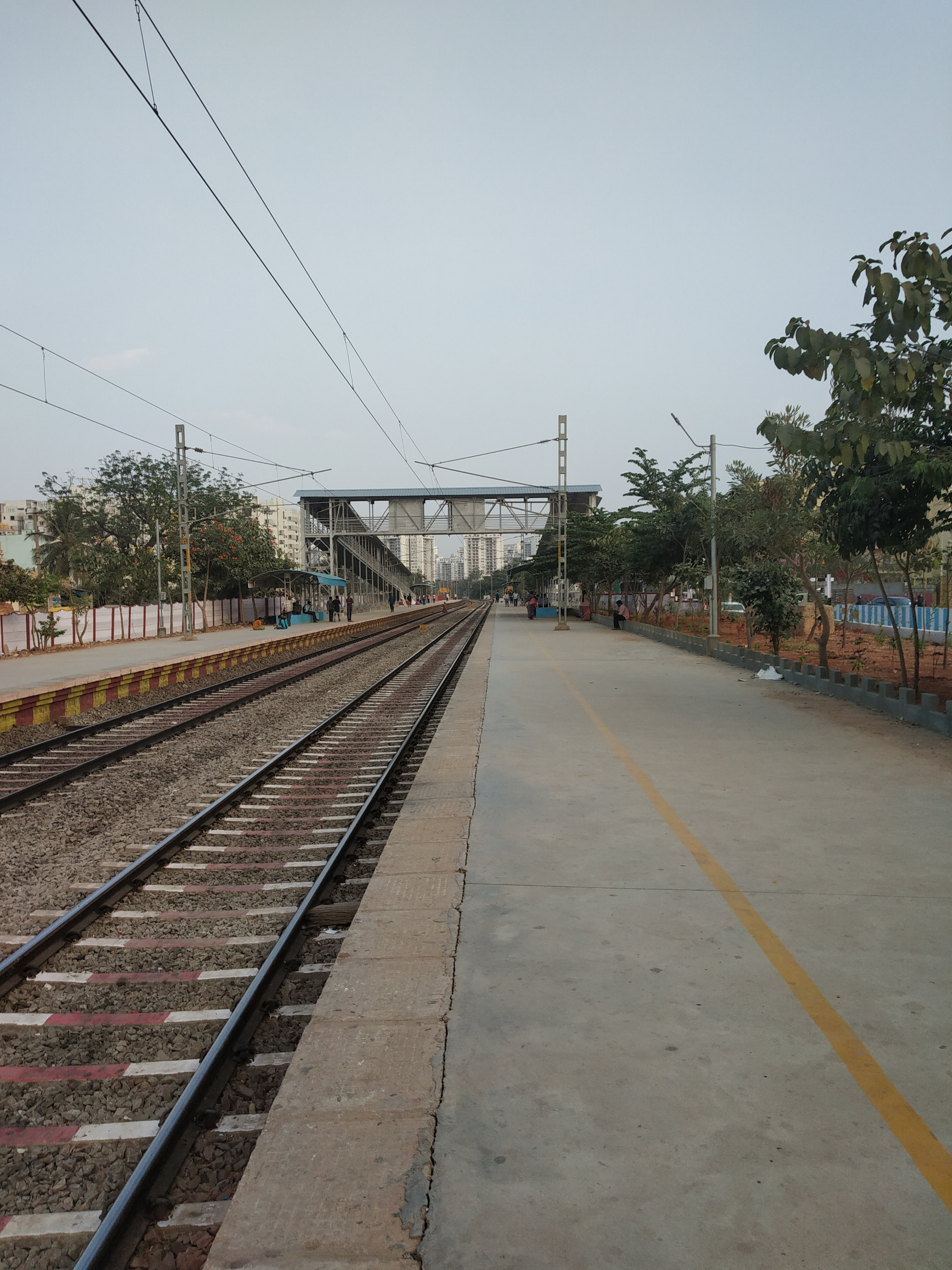

General information
- Location: India
- Coordinates: 12.9922°N 77.7159°E
- Elevation: 909 metres (2,982 ft)
- System: Indian Railways station
- Owner: Indian Railways
- Line: Chennai Central–Bangalore City line
- Platforms: 2
- Connections: Purple Line Hoodi; Bus, Taxi

Construction
- Structure type: At Grade
- Parking: Yes
- Cycle facilities: Yes

Other information
- Station code: HDIH
- Fare zone: South Western

History
- Opened: 2016

Services
Preceding station	Indian Railways	Following station
Krishnarajapuram towards Bengaluru City	South Western Railway zone Chennai Central–Bangalore City line	Whitefield towards Jolarpettai Junction or Chennai Central
Location

Hoodi Halt railway station (station code: HDIH) is an Indian Railways station located in Hoodi, Bangalore, in the Indian state of Karnataka. It is about 38 kilometres (24 mi) from the Bangalore City railway station and serves Hoodi, Whitefield and the International Tech Park area.

== Demand ==
The demand for a stop at Hoodi from 2013 reflected the needs of commuters in the Whitefield area, who actively campaigned for better transportation options. They utilized public forums and social media to raise awareness about their concerns and to advocate for the establishment of a transit stop. This kind of grassroots effort highlights the importance of community engagement in addressing local transportation issues.

A footbridge was constructed in April 2019.

== Structure and expansion ==
Hoodi Halt has two platforms, each 400 metres (1,300 ft) long, shelters, lighting, benches and a booking office.

=== Station Layout ===
G	North Entrance Street level	Exit/Entrance & ticket counter
P	FOB, Side platform | P2 Doors will open on the left (Used for MEMUs and Express trains)
P	Platform 2	Towards → Jolarpettai Junction / MGR Chennai Central next station is Whitefield
P	Platform 1	Towards ← KSR Bengaluru next station is Krishnarajapuram
P	FOB, Side platform | P1 Doors will open on the left (Used for MEMUs and Express trains)
G	South Entrance Street level	Exit/Entrance & ticket counter

== Timetable: towards Bangarpet ==
Train no.	From	To	Arrive	Depart	Days of service
66546	K S R Bengaluru	Marikuppam	07:39	07:40	Daily
06594	Baiyyappanahalli	Whitefield	08:36	08:37	Except Sunday
66542	K S R Bengaluru	Whitefield	09:23	09:24	Except Sunday
56262	K S R Bengaluru	Arakkonam	09:49	09:50	Daily
66530	K S R Bengaluru	Bangarpet	10:28	10:29	Except Sunday
76507	Bengaluru Cantt	Bangarpet	12:04	12:05	Except Sunday
66544	K S R Bengaluru	Kuppam	12:19	12:20	Except Sunday
66511	K S R Bengaluru	Marikuppam	12:51	12:52	Except Sunday
66532	K S R Bengaluru	Marikuppam	15:16	15:17	Except Sunday
06568	Baiyyappanahalli	Whitefield	16:56	16:57	Except Sunday
66515	Baiyyappanahalli	Marikuppam	17:39	17:40	Except Sunday
76505	Bengaluru Cantt	Kolar	18:18	18:19	Except Sunday
56508	K S R Bengaluru	Marikuppam	18:40	18:41	Daily
66534	Baiyyappanahalli	Kuppam	19:43	19:44	Except Sunday

== Timetable: towards K S R Bengaluru ==
Train no.	From	To	Arrive	Depart	Days of service
56507	Marikuppam	K S R Bengaluru	08:04	08:05	Daily
66529	Kuppam	K S R Bengaluru	08:25	08:26	Except Sunday
76506	Kolar	Bengaluru Cantt	08:58	08:59	Except Sunday
06567	Whitefield	Baiyyappanahalli	09:06	09:07	Except Sunday
66541	Whitefield	K S R Bengaluru	10:36	10:37	Except Sunday
66531	Bangarpet	K S R Bengaluru	13:34	13:35	Except Sunday
66545	Marikuppam	K S R Bengaluru	15:29	15:30	Daily
66543	Kuppam	K S R Bengaluru	16:08	16:09	Except Sunday
76508	Bangarpet	K S R Bengaluru	16:37	16:38	Except Sunday
66514	Marikuppam	Baiyyappanahalli	16:47	16:48	Except Sunday
56261	Arakkonam	K S R Bengaluru	17:44	17:45	Daily
06593	Whitefield	Baiyyappanahalli	18:21	18:22	Except Sunday
66533	Marikuppam	Baiyyappanahalli	18:34	18:35	Except Sunday

== Line ==
Hoodi Halt station is on the Bangalore–Chennai main line. The railway station is located between Krishnarajapuram railway station and Whitefield railway station.

== See also ==
- List of railway stations in India
