= Whitefield railway station (Bengaluru) =

Railway station in Bangalore, India

Whitefield
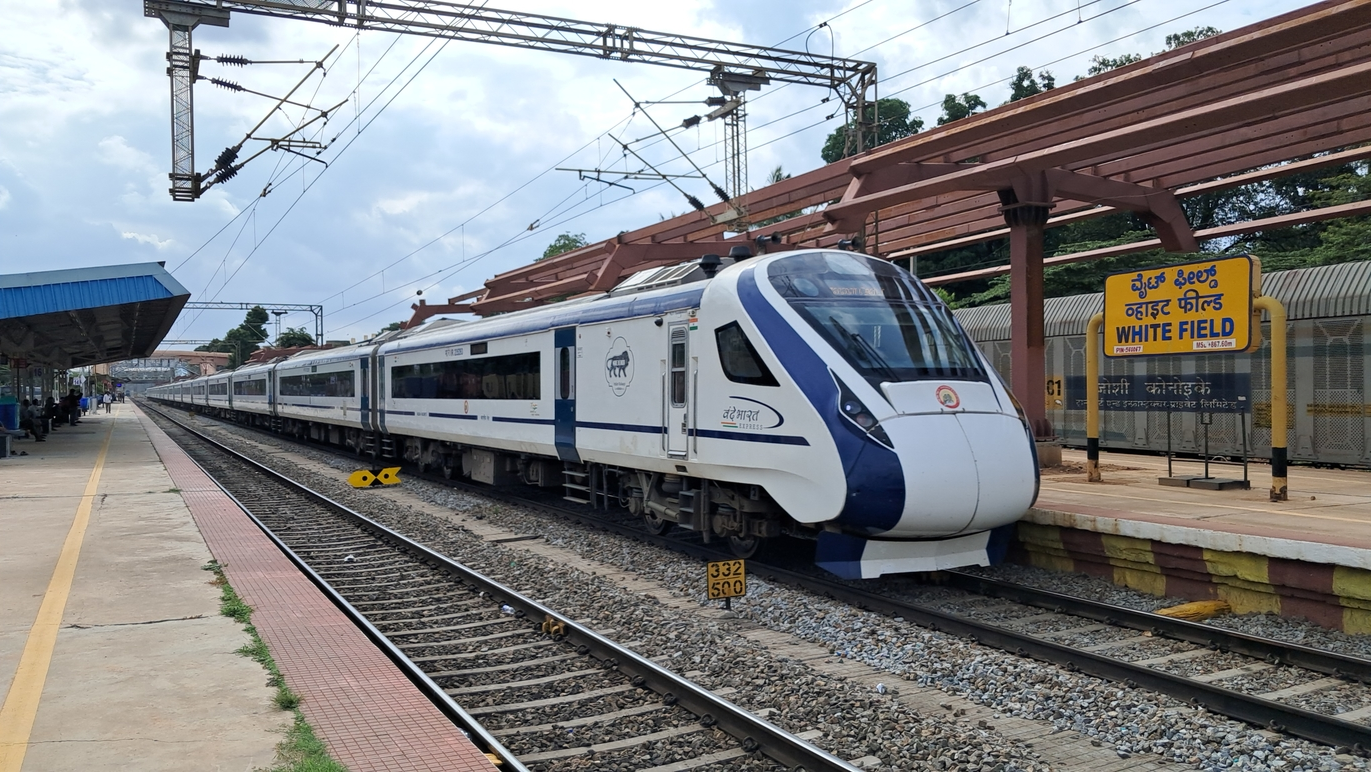
- Vande Bharat Express heading towards Chennai Central railway station

General information
- Location: Kadugodi, Bangalore; India
- Coordinates: 12.9964°N 77.7614°E
- Elevation: 874 metres (2,867 ft)
- System: Indian Railways station
- Owner: Indian Railways
- Operator: South Western Railway
- Line: Chennai Central–Bangalore City line
- Platforms: 4
- Tracks: 6
- Connections: Purple Line Whitefield (Kadugodi)

Construction
- Structure type: At Grade
- Parking: Yes
- Cycle facilities: Yes

Other information
- Status: Active
- Station code: WFD
- Fare zone: South Western Railway

History
- Opened: 1864; 162 years ago

Services
Preceding station	Indian Railways	Following station
Hoodi Halt towards Bengaluru City	Chennai Central–Bangalore City line	Devangonthi towards Jolarpettai Junction or Chennai Central
Route map
Location

Whitefield railway station (station code: WFD) is an Indian Railways train station located in Whitefield, Bengaluru, in the Indian state of Karnataka, which is about 8 km away from the Krishnarajapuram railway station and serves the Whitefield area.

The Whitefield railway station is about 3 km north of the Whitefield Bus stop. It lies on the Bangalore–Chennai route and is double and electrified, the Krishnarajapuram–Whitefield section is slated to be converted to a quadruple line. The station is slated to become a junction with a new Whitefield–Kolar (53 km; 33 miles) line being laid. It is located near the Whitefield (Kadugodi) metro station of the Bengaluru Namma Metro system.

== Structure ==
Whitefield railway station has four platforms, each running to 650m in length, shelters, lighting, benches and a booking office.

=== Station Layout ===
G	Street level	Exit/Entrance & ticket counter
P1	Platform 1	Towards ← KSR Bengaluru next station is Hoodi Halt
P1	FOB, Island platform | P1 & P2 Doors will open on the left | (Used for MEMUs and Express trains)
P1	Platform 2	Towards → Jolarpettai Junction / MGR Chennai Central next station is Devangonthi
P1	Platform 3	Towards ← KSR Bengaluru next station is Hoodi Halt
P1	FOB, Island platform | P3 Doors will open on the left | (Used for MEMUs and Express trains)
P1	Platform 4	Not in Operation
P1

== Line ==
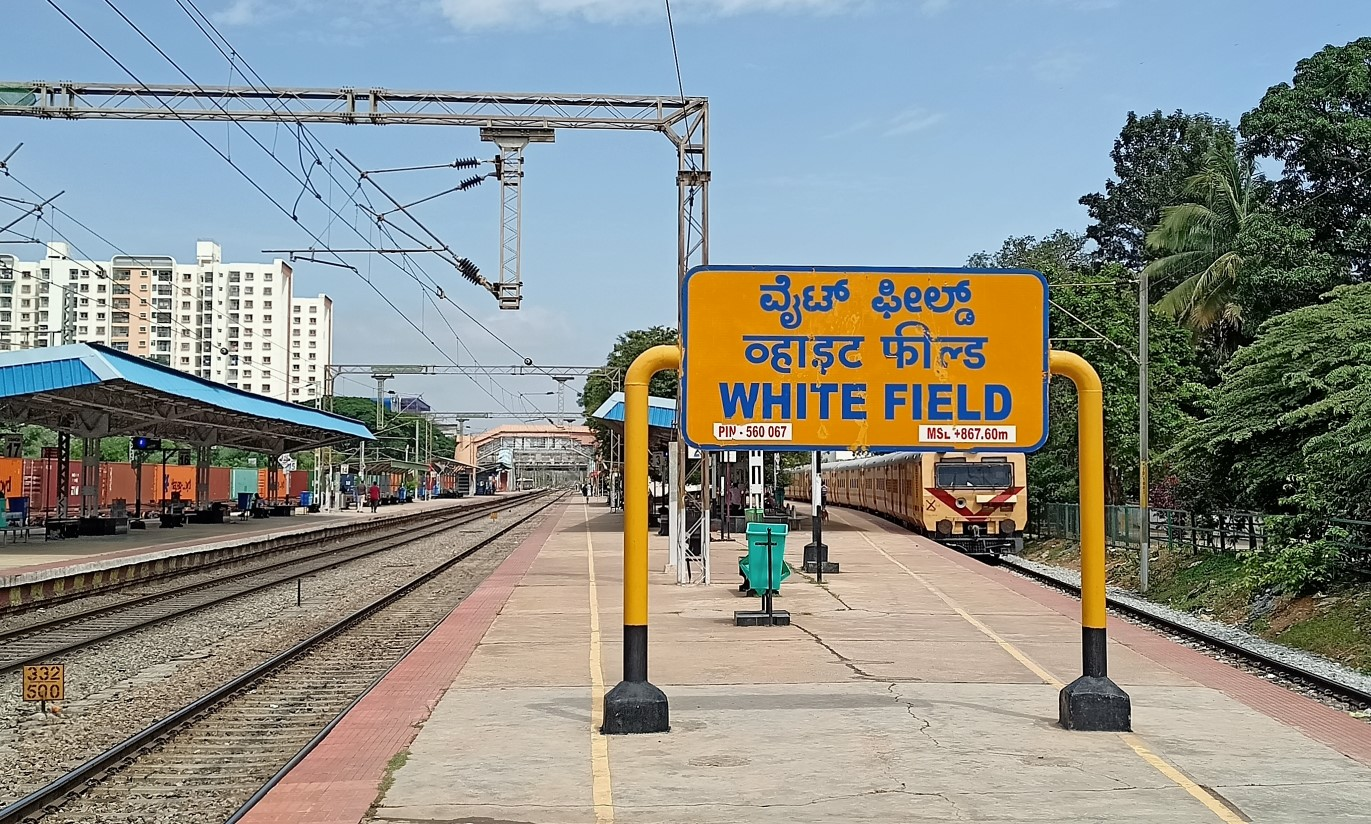
Station Board

Whitefield railway station is on the Bangalore–Chennai main line. The railway station is located between Hoodi Halt railway station and Devangonthi railway station.

== Originating/terminating trains ==
Train number	Train name	Type	Source	Destination
06567/06568	Whitefield–Baiyyappanahalli MEMU Special	EMU	Whitefield	Baiyyappanahalli
66541/66542	Whitefield–KSR Bengaluru City EMU	MEMU	Whitefield	Bengaluru City
06593/06594	Whitefield–Baiyyappanahalli EMU Special	Passenger	Whitefield	Baiyyappanahalli

== See also ==
- List of railway stations in India

Preceding station	Indian Railways	Following station
Hoodi Halt towards ?	South Western Railway zone Chennai Central–Bangalore City line	Devangonthi towards ?
