= Love Me Better =

2017 pop song by James Blunt

Single by James Blunt

from the album The Afterlove
- Released: 27 January 2017
- Recorded: 2016
- Genre: Pop
- Length: 3:38
- Label: Atlantic Records UK
- Songwriters: James Blunt; Ryan Tedder; Zach Skelton
- Producers: Ryan Tedder; Zach Skelton

James Blunt singles chronology
"When I Find Love Again" (2014)	"Love Me Better" (2017)	"Bartender" (2017)

Music video
- "Love Me Better" on YouTube

"Love Me Better" is a song by British singer-songwriter James Blunt. It was released on 27 January 2017 as the lead single from his fifth studio album, The Afterlove (2017). The song was written by Blunt, Ryan Tedder and Zach Skelton.

== Music video ==
An accompanying music video directed by Vaughan Arnell was released onto YouTube on 2 February 2017 at a total length of three minutes and forty-nine seconds.

== Live performances ==
Blunt performed the song on The Graham Norton Show on 24 February 2017.

== Track listing ==
Digital download
No.	Title	Length
1.	"Love Me Better"	3:38

== Charts ==
Chart (2017)	Peak position
Belgium (Ultratip Bubbling Under Flanders)	12
Belgium (Ultratip Bubbling Under Wallonia)	7
France (SNEP)	140
Slovenia (SloTop50)	42
Sweden (Sverigetopplistan)	99
Switzerland (Schweizer Hitparade)	87
UK Singles (OCC)	93

== Release history ==
Region	Date	Format	Label
United Kingdom	27 January 2017	Digital download	Atlantic Records UK
