= Hoodi =

District in Bangalore, India

Coordinates: 12°59′31.2″N 77°42′56.88″E

Hoodi, once a village, is now an expanding district in Bangalore, India. It is around 20 kilometres (12 mi) east of the Kempegowda Bus stand and 2 kilometres (1.2 mi) from International Tech Park, the information technology hub of Bangalore. It is on the Whitefield - International Tech Park main road.

Location of Hoodi in Bangalore

With the moving of IT companies into the area, there is much construction of commercial and residential property. Software companies in the area include Oracle, SAP, TCS, IBM and Genisys Group. There have been several companies established here at Hoodi during 2018 to 2021, such as SolarClue, Varistor Technologies Pvt Ltd, Fabzen, Milmila and many more. Hoodi has a government school that is more than 90 years old, which has recently constructed a stadium.

== Access ==
Railway

Hoodi Halt railway station opened in 2016 to cater for local IT commuters. The station is located between Krishnarajpuram and Whitefield railway stations.

Bus service

Hoodi is well connected by Bangalore Metropolitan Transport Corporation bus service, which runs both air-conditioned and non-air-conditioned buses.
