= Phoenix Marketcity (Bengaluru) =

Shopping mall in Bengaluru, Karnataka, India

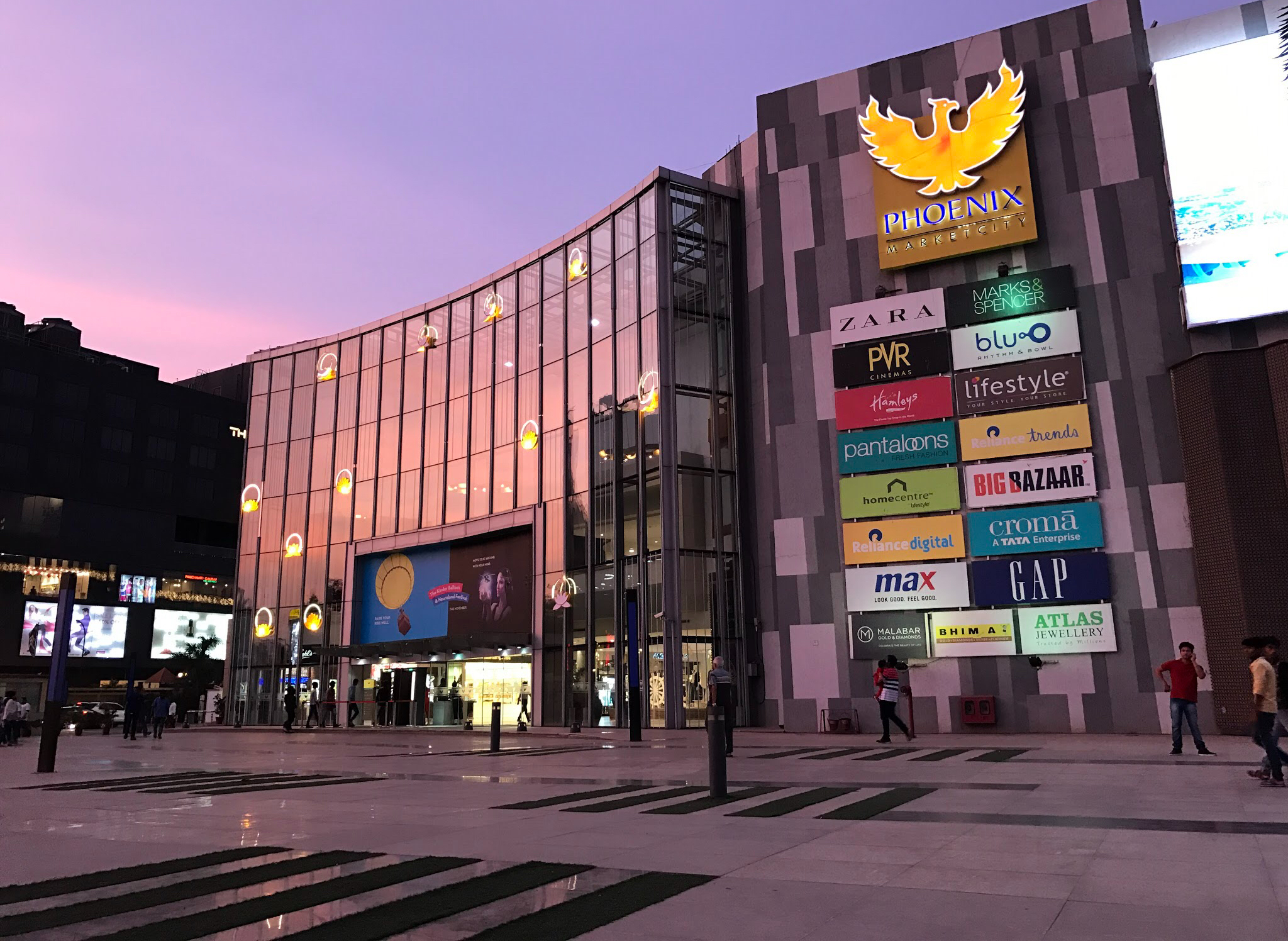
- Location: Bengaluru, Karnataka, India
- Coordinates: 12.996°N 77.696°E
- Address: Whitefield Main Road, Singayyanapalya, Mahadevapura
- Developer: Island Star Mall Developers Private Limited.
- Architect: Benoy
- Num. of stores: 296+
- Num. of anchor tenants: 15+
- Floor area: 1,000,000 sq ft (93,000 m^{2})
- Floors: 4, including basement
- Parking: 1700 car parks
- Public transit: Purple at Singayyanapalya
- Website: www.phoenixmarketcity.com/bangalore

Phoenix Marketcity is a shopping mall developed by The Phoenix Mills Co. Ltd., located in Bengaluru, Karnataka, India.

It is the largest mall in Bangalore by area and occupying with total area of 1,000,000 square feet (93,000 m^{2}) on four floors, which houses 296 stores, a nine-screen PVR Cinemas multiplex and a food court.

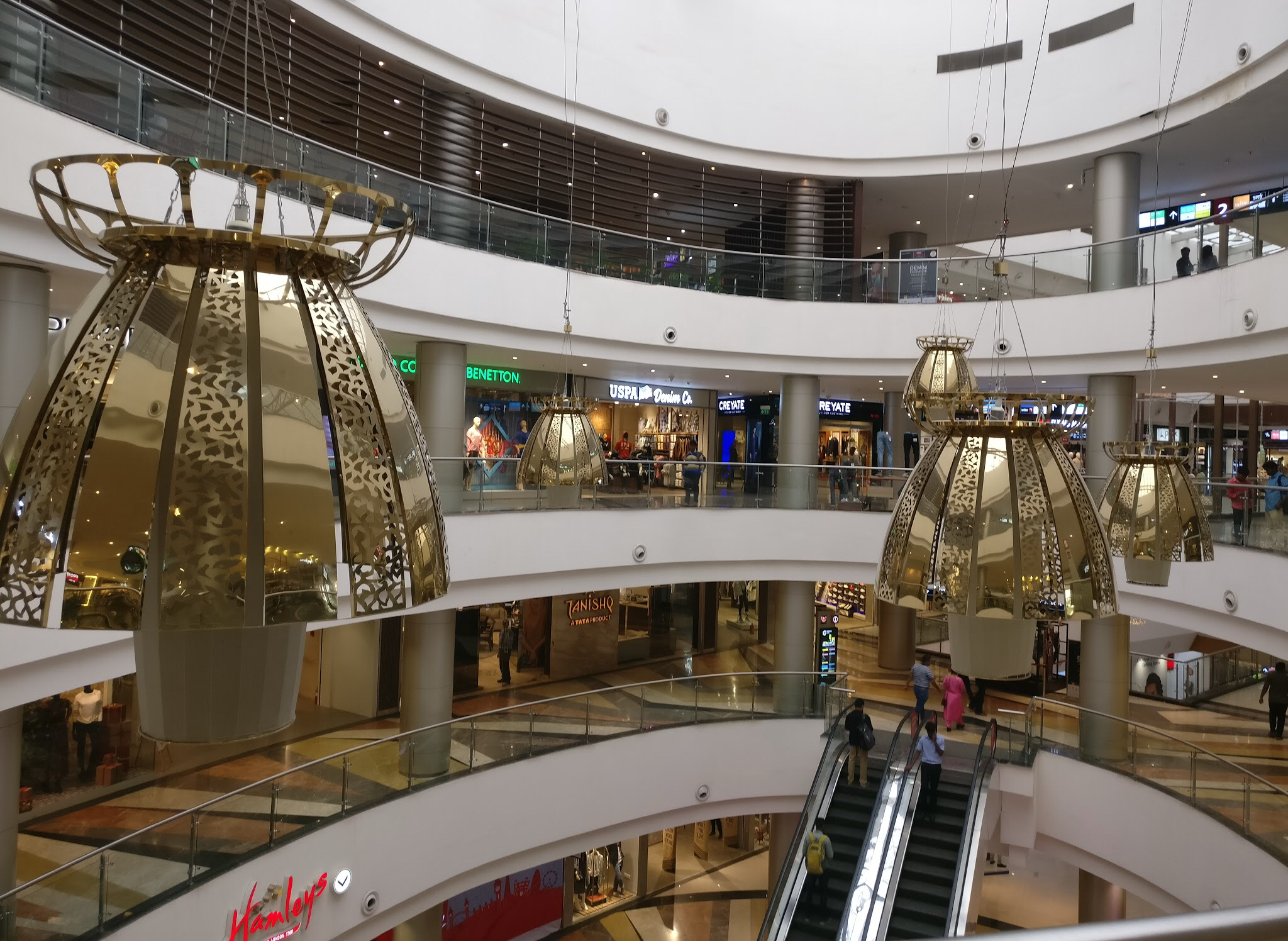
Inside View

== History ==
On 28 October 2013, the PVR multiplex along with 54 other shops in the mall were sealed for not having obtained trade licenses from the Bruhat Bangalore Mahanagara Palike, but later reopened.

On 18 May 2016, Phoenix Mall was raided along with other malls in the city, on a tip-off that they were ignoring the ban on plastic bags. Phoenix was one of the bigger violators and over 1,000 kg (2,200 lb) of plastic bags were seized from the mall and a fine imposed.

== See also ==
- Phoenix Marketcity (Mumbai)
- Phoenix Marketcity (Chennai)
- High Street Phoenix
- List of shopping malls in India
- List of shopping malls in Bangalore
