= Moon Landing (album) =

Studio album by James Blunt
- Released: 18 October 2013
- Recorded: March–July 2013
- Studios: London, New York City, Los Angeles
- Genres: Pop rock, folk rock
- Length: 43:18
- Labels: Custard, Atlantic
- Producers: Tom Rothrock, Steve Mac, Steve Robson, Dan Wilson, Ryan Tedder

James Blunt chronology
Some Kind of Trouble (2010)	Moon Landing (2013)	The Afterlove (2017)

Singles from Moon Landing
- 1. "Bonfire Heart" Released: 4 October 2013; 2. "Heart to Heart" Released: 3 February 2014; 3. "Postcards" Released: 19 May 2014; 4. "When I Find Love Again" Released: 16 September 2014

Moon Landing is the fourth studio album by British singer-songwriter James Blunt, released on 18 October 2013 through Custard Records and Atlantic Records. The album is the follow-up to 2010's Some Kind of Trouble, making it Blunt's first new material in three years. The album features production from the likes of Tom Rothrock, Steve Mac, Guy Chambers and Steve Robson, and was executively produced by Tom Rothrock, who worked with Blunt on 2004's Back to Bedlam.

The first single from the album, "Bonfire Heart", debuted at number six before peaking at number four the following week in the UK Singles Chart. The single peaked at one in Germany, Switzerland and Austria. It was in the top 10 in different countries all over the world.

On 10 November 2014, the album was re-released as Moon Landing – Apollo Edition, with five bonus tracks.

== Background ==
On 11 July 2013, Blunt announced that he had finished recording his fourth studio album, titled Moon Landing. The album features production from Back to Bedlam producer Tom Rothrock.

The lead single, "Bonfire Heart", was released on 4 October 2013, the song is fueled by just acoustic guitars and a stomping kick drum, reflects Blunt's newly stripped-down take. The song "Miss America" is a tribute to Whitney Houston, as revealed by Blunt in an acoustic video of the song on his YouTube channel. Blunt's return to music received widespread press coverage, after an error in the mailing system led to the link to "Bonfire Heart" being e-mailed to a large number of e-mail accounts in the United Kingdom. Unplugged versions of the songs called "Miss America" and "Face the Sun", and the lyrics video of the song "Satellites" were unveiled on YouTube.

On 16 September 2014, Blunt confirmed on his official Instagram account that Moon Landing would be re-released on November that same year. That new version of the album will be named Moon Landing - Apollo Edition and will contain 19 tracks: the 11 of the original disc, plus the 3 bonus tracks of the album's deluxe version (Telephone, Kiss This Love Goodbye and Hollywood) and five new tracks (Smoke Signals, When I Find Love Again, Breathe, Trail of Broken Hearts and Working It Out). The new track When I Find Love Again was released as a single that same day, after being played in BBC's Radio 2 for the first time ever. This new version of the album will also contain a 19-track live DVD recorded during Blunt's performance in the 2014 edition of the Paléo Festival.

== Critical reception ==
Professional ratings
Aggregate scores
Source	Rating
Metacritic	49/100
Review scores
Source	Rating
AllMusic	3.5/5 stars
The Guardian	2/5 stars
The Independent	2/5 stars
musicOMH	2/5 stars
The Observer	1/5 stars
Rolling Stone	2.5/5 stars

Moon Landing received mixed reviews from music critics.

== Track listing ==
The album is available in three editions – a standard 11-track release, deluxe 14-track release and super deluxe box set, containing a bonus DVD, handwritten lyric booklet and special photographs from the making of the album, with the first five hundred to be signed by James himself. The Japanese edition also contains three exclusive bonus recordings. On 21 October 2014, the album was re-released as Moon Landing: Apollo Edition with five additional tracks. In the United States, the new tracks were released as part of the Smoke Signals EP on 15 December 2014.

Moon Landing — Standard version
No.	Title	Writer(s)	Producer(s)	Length
1.	"Face the Sun"	James Blunt, Steve Robson	Tom Rothrock	4:03
2.	"Satellites"	Blunt, Claude Kelly, Steve Mac	Tom Rothrock	3:12
3.	"Bonfire Heart"	Blunt, Ryan Tedder	Tedder	3:58
4.	"Heart to Heart"	Blunt, Daniel Parker, Daniel Omelio	Terefe, Robopop (co.), Ammar Malik (co.), Blunt (co.)	3:29
5.	"Miss America"	Blunt, Wayne Hector, Mac	Tom Rothrock	3:07
6.	"The Only One"	Blunt, Hector, Mac	Tom Rothrock	3:41
7.	"Sun on Sunday"	Blunt, Kelly, Mac	Tom Rothrock	3:18
8.	"Bones"	Blunt, Hector, Mac	Tom Rothrock, Mac (co.)	2:53
9.	"Always Hate Me"	Blunt, Ammar Malik	Tom Rothrock	3:37
10.	"Postcards"	Blunt, Hector, Mac	Terefe	4:46
11.	"Blue on Blue"	Blunt, Steve McEwan	Terefe	3:53

Moon Landing — Deluxe version (bonus tracks)
No.	Title	Writer(s)	Producer(s)	Length
12.	"Telephone"	Blunt, Kevin Griffin	Terefe	3:22
13.	"Kiss This Love Goodbye"	Blunt, Griffin	Tom Rothrock	2:34
14.	"Hollywood"	Blunt, Hector, Robson	Steve Robson	3:21

Moon Landing — US version (bonus track)
No.	Title	Writer(s)	Producer(s)	Length
12.	"Miss America" (Acoustic version from Angel Studios)	Blunt, Wayne Hector, Mac	Dan Massie	3:04

Moon Landing — Target edition (bonus tracks)
No.	Title	Writer(s)	Producer(s)	Length
12.	"Miss America" (Acoustic version from Angel Studios)	Blunt, Wayne Hector, Mac	Dan Massie	3:04
13.	"Telephone"	Blunt, Kevin Griffin	Terefe	3:22
14.	"Kiss This Love Goodbye"	Blunt, Griffin	Tom Rothrock	2:34
15.	"Hollywood"	Blunt, Hector, Robson	Steve Robson	3:21

Moon Landing — Japanese version (bonus tracks)
No.	Title	Writer(s)	Producer(s)	Length
12.	"Telephone"	Blunt, Kevin Griffin	Kevin Griffin	3:22
13.	"Kiss This Love Goodbye"	Blunt, Griffin	Tom Rothrock	2:34
14.	"Hollywood"	Blunt, Hector, Robson	Steve Robson	3:21
15.	"Next Time I'm Seventeen"	Blunt, Matt Hales, Dan Wilson	Dan Wilson	3:55
16.	"Heroes"	Blunt, Guy Chambers	Guy Chambers	3:43
17.	"Miss America" (Angel Studios Acoustic)	Blunt, Mac, Hector	Steve Mac	3:04

Moon Landing: Apollo Edition
No.	Title	Writer(s)	Producer(s)	Length
1.	"Smoke Signals"	Blunt, Danny Parker	Parker	3:43
2.	"When I Find Love Again"	Mac, Benjamin Levin, Ammar Malik, Daniel Omelio, Ross Golan, Charlotte Aitchison	Steve Mac, Benny Blanco, Robopop	3:05
3.	"Face the Sun"	James Blunt, Steve Robson	Tom Rothrock	4:03
4.	"Satellites"	Blunt, Claude Kelly, Steve Mac	Tom Rothrock	3:12
5.	"Bonfire Heart"	Blunt, Ryan Tedder	Tedder	3:58
6.	"Heart to Heart"	Blunt, Daniel Parker, Daniel Omelio	Terefe, Robopop	3:29
7.	"Miss America"	Blunt, Wayne Hector, Mac	Tom Rothrock	3:07
8.	"The Only One"	Blunt, Hector, Mac	Tom Rothrock	3:41
9.	"Sun on Sunday"	Blunt, Kelly, Mac	Tom Rothrock	3:18
10.	"Bones"	Blunt, Hector, Mac	Tom Rothrock, Mac	2:53
11.	"Always Hate Me"	Blunt, Ammar Malik	Tom Rothrock	3:37
12.	"Postcards"	Blunt, Hector, Mac	Terefe	4:46
13.	"Blue on Blue"	Blunt, Steve McEwan	Terefe	3:53
14.	"Telephone"	Blunt, Kevin Griffin	Kevin Griffin	3:22
15.	"Kiss This Love Goodbye"	Blunt, Griffin	Tom Rothrock	2:34
16.	"Hollywood"	Blunt, Hector, Robson	Steve Robson	3:21
17.	"Breathe"	Blunt	Terefe	4:21
18.	"Trail of Broken Hearts"	Blunt, Malik, Terefe	Terefe	4:26
19.	"Working It Out"	Blunt, Hector, Mac	Mac	4:21

== Personnel ==
- James Blunt – lead vocals, guitars, piano, keyboards
- Sasha Krivtsov – bass
- Charlie Paxson – drums, percussion
- John Nau – keyboards
- Matt Chait – guitars
- Tom Rothrock – guitars, keyboards
- Mike Tarantino – engineering
- Smith Carlson – engineer
- John Garrison – bass guitar

== Charts ==
=== Weekly charts ===
Chart (2013–15)	Peak position
Australian Albums (ARIA)	2
Austrian Albums (Ö3 Austria)	1
Belgian Albums (Ultratop Flanders)	12
Belgian Albums (Ultratop Wallonia)	5
Canadian Albums (Billboard)	2
Danish Albums (Hitlisten)	12
Dutch Albums (Album Top 100)	6
Finnish Albums (Suomen virallinen lista)	13
French Albums (SNEP)	5
German Albums (Offizielle Top 100)	2
Hungarian Albums (MAHASZ)	1
Irish Albums (IRMA)	5
Italian Albums (FIMI)	7
Mexican Albums (Top 100 Mexico)	96
New Zealand Albums (RMNZ)	4
Norwegian Albums (VG-lista)	12
Polish Albums (ZPAV)	39
Portuguese Albums (AFP)	28
Scottish Albums (Official Charts)	2
Spanish Albums (Promusicae)	15
Swedish Albums (Sverigetopplistan)	9
Swiss Albums (Schweizer Hitparade)	1
UK Albums (Official Charts)	2
US Billboard 200	20

=== Year-end charts ===
Chart (2013)	Position
Australian Albums (ARIA)	25
Austrian Albums (Ö3 Austria)	47
Belgian Albums (Ultratop Flanders)	145
Belgian Albums (Ultratop Wallonia)	56
Dutch Albums (Album Top 100)	97
French Albums (SNEP)	50
German Albums (Offizielle Top 100)	25
Hungarian Albums (MAHASZ)	29
New Zealand Albums (RMNZ)	41
Swiss Albums (Schweizer Hitparade)	20
UK Albums (OCC)	37

Chart (2014)	Position
Australian Albums (ARIA)	54
Austrian Albums (Ö3 Austria)	32
Belgian Albums (Ultratop Flanders)	176
Belgian Albums (Ultratop Wallonia)	57
French Albums (SNEP)	113
German Albums (Offizielle Top 100)	29
Italian Albums (FIMI)	76
Swedish Albums (Sverigetopplistan)	56
Swiss Albums (Schweizer Hitparade)	14
UK Albums (OCC)	47

== Certifications and sales ==
Region	Certification	Certified units/sales
Australia (ARIA)	Platinum	70,000^{^}
Austria (IFPI Austria)	Platinum	15,000^{*}
Canada (Music Canada)	Gold	40,000^{^}
France (SNEP)	Platinum	100,000^{*}
Germany (BVMI)	3× Gold	300,000^{‡}
Hungary (MAHASZ)	Platinum	2,000^{^}
Italy (FIMI)	Gold	25,000^{*}
New Zealand (RMNZ)	Gold	7,500^{^}
Poland (ZPAV)	Gold	10,000^{‡}
Switzerland (IFPI Switzerland)	Platinum	20,000^{^}
United Kingdom (BPI)	Platinum	448,248
^{*} Sales figures based on certification alone.^{^} Shipments figures based on certification alone.^{‡} Sales+streaming figures based on certification alone.

== Release history ==
Region	Date	Version	Format	Label
Australia	18 October 2013	Standard edition Deluxe edition	CD, digital download	Custard Records, Atlantic Records
New Zealand	18 October 2013	Standard edition Deluxe edition	CD, digital download	Custard Records, Atlantic Records
Ireland	18 October 2013	Standard edition Deluxe edition	CD, digital download	Custard Records, Atlantic Records
Germany	18 October 2013	Standard edition Deluxe edition	CD, digital download	Custard Records, Atlantic Records
United Kingdom	21 October 2013	Standard edition Deluxe edition Super deluxe edition	CD, digital download	Custard Records, Atlantic Records
Italy	22 October 2013	Standard edition	CD, digital download	Custard Records, Atlantic Records
Canada	22 October 2013	Standard edition Deluxe edition	CD, digital download	Custard Records, Atlantic Records
South Korea	22 October 2013	Deluxe edition	CD, digital download	Custard Records, Atlantic Records
Japan	23 October 2013	Japanese edition	CD, digital download	Custard Records, Atlantic Records
Greece	1 November 2013	Standard edition	CD, digital download	The Spicy Effect
United States	5 November 2013	Standard edition Deluxe edition	CD, digital download	Custard Records, Atlantic Records
