= Postcards (James Blunt song) =

Single by James Blunt

from the album Moon Landing
- Released: 19 May 2014
- Recorded: 2011−13
- Genre: Pop rock; folk pop; tropical house
- Length: 4:46
- Label: Atlantic Records
- Songwriters: James Blunt; Wayne Hector; Steve Robson
- Producer: Martin Terefe

James Blunt singles chronology
| "Heart to Heart" (2014) | "Postcards" (2014) | "When I Find Love Again" (2014) |

Music video
- "Postcards" on YouTube

"Postcards" is a song recorded by British singer-songwriter James Blunt. It was released on 19 May 2014, as the third single from his fourth studio album, Moon Landing (2013). The song was written by James Blunt, Wayne Hector, Steve Robson and produced by Martin Terefe.

== Track listing ==
Digital download
| No. | Title | Length |
|---|---|---|
| 1. | "Postcards" | 4:46 |

== Charts ==
| Chart (2014) | Peak position |
|---|---|
| Austria (Ö3 Austria Top 40) | 10 |
| Belgium (Ultratip Bubbling Under Flanders) | 36 |
| Belgium (Ultratip Bubbling Under Wallonia) | 10 |
| Germany (GfK) | 50 |
| Italy (FIMI) | 25 |
| Switzerland (Schweizer Hitparade) | 31 |
| UK Singles (OCC) | 90 |

== Certifications and sales ==
| Region | Certification | Certified units/sales |
|---|---|---|
| Italy (FIMI) | Gold | 15,000^{‡} |
^{‡} Sales+streaming figures based on certification alone.

== Release history ==
| Region | Date | Format | Label |
|---|---|---|---|
| United Kingdom | 19 May 2014 | Digital download | Atlantic Records |
