= The Majority Says =

Swedish pop rock band

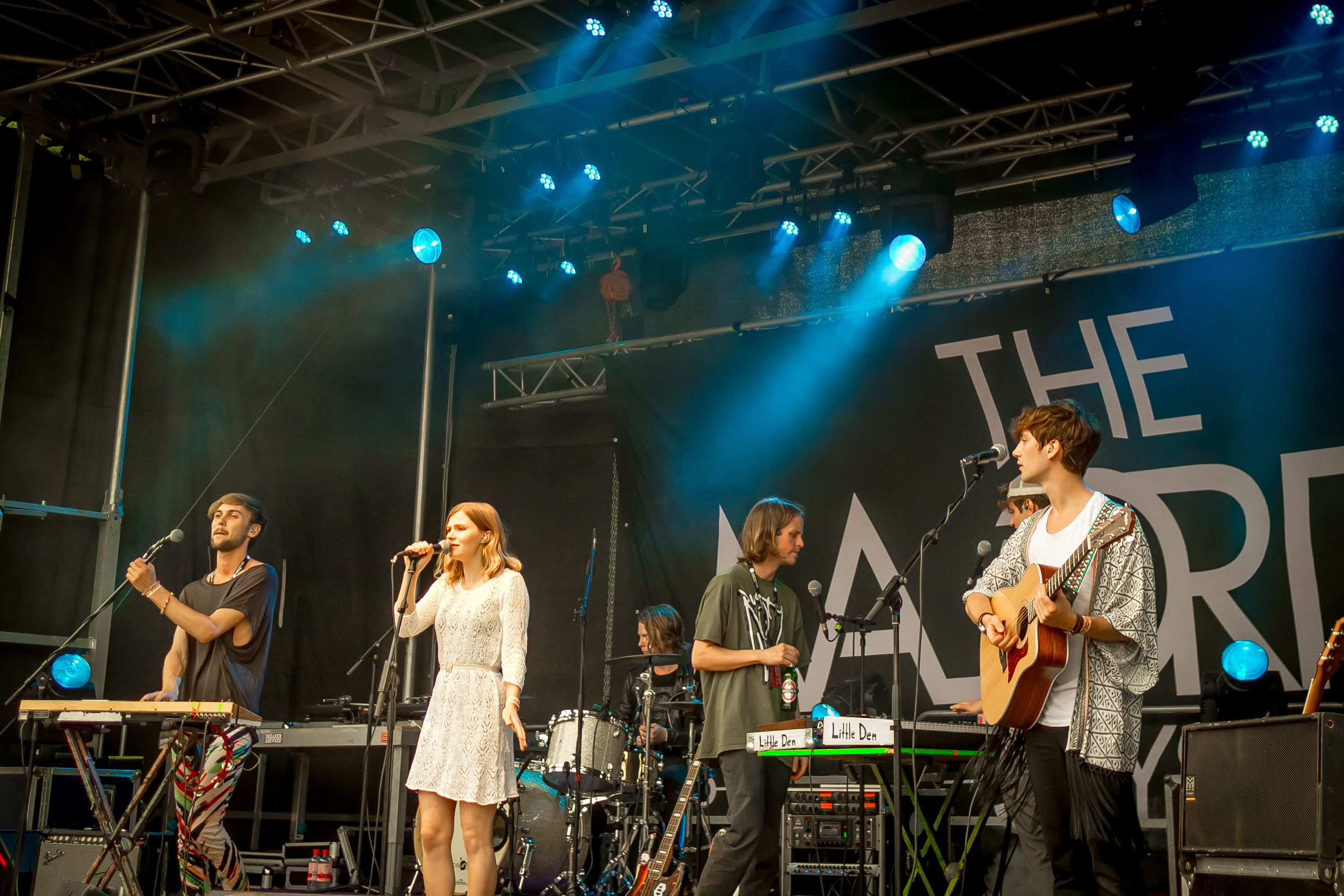
- The Majority Says performing at Kosmonaut Festival, June 2015.

Background information
- Origin: Linköping, Stockholm, Sweden
- Genres: Pop, Electronic
- Years active: 2010-
- Labels: Warner Music Group Germany
- Members: Hanna Antonsson; Timo Krantz; Mathias Jonasson; Jonathan Lennerbrant
- Past members: Mio Negga; Coach Jonsson; Emil Berg
- Website: www.themajoritysays.com

The Majority Says is a Swedish pop rock band. The band was formed in 2010 in Linköping, Sweden. On Valentine's Day 2012 they released their first EP "Best Night Ever". Their song "114" was featured in a large TV advert broadcast in Scandinavia and Eastern Europe for the new Viasat Film channel. Their songs have also been used in some American TV series, such as Pretty Little Liars, MTV's Catfish and The Real L Word.

Their first full-length album Under Streetlights was released in October 2012 (only in Scandinavia). In June 2013 the band did a cover of the One Direction song "Little Things" for adverts of the supermarket chain Lidl. In December 2013 The Majority Says released their second EP, "Between Love And Simple Friends" including the song "Run Alone". The song is featured in the German motion picture "Vaterfreuden", starring Matthias Schweighöfer (released in cinemas Feb 6, 2014 Warner Brothers). In January 2014 the band performed at the well known German fashion designer Michael Michalsky's event "StyleNite" during Berlin Fashion Week. They also performed at Laurèl fashion show in July 2014. Their international debut album called "The Majority Says" was released in August 2014 via Warner Music Group. The Majority Says has been supporting act for the German singer-songwriter Philipp Poisel during his summer tour 2014 in Germany and for James Blunt on his three shows in Sweden 2014.

== Discography ==
=== EP:s ===
- 2012: Best Night Ever
- 2013: Between Love And Simple Friends

=== Album ===
- 2012: Under Streetlights (Scandinavia)
- 2014: The Majority Says

=== Singles ===
- 2011: Kings Of The Night
- 2011: Trouble
- 2012: 114
- 2013: Where Is The Line
- 2014: Run alone
- 2014: Silly Ghost

== Members ==
- Hanna Antonsson
- Timo Krantz
- Jonathan Lennerbrant
- Mathias Jonasson

=== Past members ===
- Mio Negga
- Coach Jonsson
- Emil Berg
