= Heart to Heart (James Blunt song) =

Single by James Blunt

from the album Moon Landing
- Released: February 3, 2014
- Recorded: 2012/13
- Genre: Pop rock
- Length: 3:29
- Label: Custard; Atlantic
- Songwriters: James Blunt; Daniel Omelio; Daniel Parker
- Producers: Martin Terefe & Robopop

James Blunt singles chronology
"Bonfire Heart" (2013)	"Heart to Heart" (2014)	"Postcards" (2014)

Music video
- "Heart To Heart" on YouTube

"Heart to Heart" is a song performed by British singer-songwriter James Blunt, from his fourth studio album, Moon Landing (2013). It was released on February 3, 2014, as a digital download. The song has peaked to number 42 on the UK Singles Chart, the song has also charted in Australia, Austria, Belgium, Germany, Italy and Switzerland. The song was written by Blunt, Daniel Omelio, and Daniel Parker.

== Music video ==
A music video to accompany the release of "Heart to Heart" was first released onto YouTube on December 17, 2013, at a total length of 3:41 minutes.

== Track listing ==
Digital download
No.	Title	Length
1.	"Heart to Heart"	3:29

CD Single
No.	Title	Length
1.	"Heart to Heart"	3:28
2.	"Bonfire Heart (Live at Reeperbahn Festival 2013)"	3:38
3.	"Satellites (Acoustic Version from Angel Studios)"	2:42
4.	"Miss America (Acoustic Version from Angel Studios)"	3:04

== Charts and certifications ==
=== Weekly charts ===
Chart (2014)	Peak position
Australia (ARIA)	26
Austria (Ö3 Austria Top 40)	10
Belgium (Ultratip Bubbling Under Flanders)	24
Belgium (Ultratip Bubbling Under Wallonia)	8
Czech Republic Airplay (ČNS IFPI)	49
Germany (GfK)	17
Hungary (Rádiós Top 40)	9
Hungary (Single Top 40)	40
Italy (FIMI)	8
Slovakia Airplay (ČNS IFPI)	25
Slovakia Singles Digital (ČNS IFPI)	94
Slovenia (SloTop50)	29
Switzerland (Schweizer Hitparade)	37
UK Singles (Official Charts Company)	42

=== Year-end charts ===
Chart (2014)	Position
Germany (Official German Charts)	93
Hungary (Rádiós Top 40)	51
Italy (FIMI)	96

=== Certifications ===
Region	Certification	Certified units/sales
Australia (ARIA)	Gold	35,000^{^}
Germany (BVMI)	Gold	150,000^{‡}
Italy (FIMI)	Platinum	30,000^{‡}
^{^} Shipments figures based on certification alone.^{‡} Sales+streaming figures based on certification alone.

== Release history ==
Region	Date	Format	Label
United Kingdom	3 February 2014	Digital download	Custard Records; Atlantic Records
