= Bonfire Heart =

Single by James Blunt

from the album Moon Landing
- Released: 6 October 2013
- Genre: Pop rock; folk rock
- Length: 3:54
- Label: Atlantic
- Songwriters: James Blunt, Ryan Tedder
- Producer: Ryan Tedder

James Blunt singles chronology
| "Dangerous" (2011) | "Bonfire Heart" (2013) | "Heart to Heart" (2014) |

Music video
- "Bonfire Heart" on YouTube

"Bonfire Heart" is the lead single from British singer-songwriter James Blunt's fourth studio album, Moon Landing (2013). The song was written by Blunt and OneRepublic's lead singer Ryan Tedder, with whom Blunt had previously written the single "Stay the Night".

The song debuted at number six and climbed to number four on the UK Singles Chart.

== Promotion ==
Blunt's record label sent out an email notifying Blunt's fans of the song's release, only to later discover they had inadvertently emailed their entire database. Blunt later took to Twitter to apologise for emailing "the whole of the UK by mistake". The email invited its recipients to visit Blunt's SoundCloud page, where the song could be streamed for free. The song had its first radio broadcast on BBC Radio 2 on 29 July, with a lyric video being uploaded to Blunt's YouTube page later that day.

On 7 October, Blunt performed the song live on the results show of the Australian X-Factor.

On 5 November, Blunt performed the song live on The Ellen DeGeneres Show.

On 28 February 2014, Blunt, after being interviewed, performed the song live on Skavlan.

== Music video ==
A music video directed by Vaughan Arnell was released on 28 August 2013.

The music video for "Bonfire Heart" was filmed in Eastern Idaho as well as Wyoming.

The portion of the music video shot in Idaho was filmed along U.S. Route 20 and Idaho State Highway 33 near Driggs, Idaho.

The portion of the music video shot in Wyoming was filmed along U.S. Route 191 and Wyoming Highway 22. Some scenes were captured in the Grand Teton National Park near Moran, Wyoming.

== Track listing ==
Digital download - Single

1. Bonfire Heart (Blunt, Tedder)

CD Maxi Single/Digital download - EP

1. Bonfire Heart (Blunt, Tedder)
2. Miss America (Acoustic Version from Angel Studios) (Blunt, Steve Mac, Wayne Hector)
3. Next Time I'm Seventeen (Blunt, Matt Hales, Dan Wilson)
4. Heroes (Blunt, Guy Chambers)

== Charts and certifications ==
=== Weekly charts ===
Weekly chart performance
| Chart (2013–14) | Peak position |
|---|---|
| Australia (ARIA) | 3 |
| Austria (Ö3 Austria Top 40) | 1 |
| Belgium (Ultratop 50 Flanders) | 22 |
| Belgium (Ultratop 50 Wallonia) | 15 |
| Canada Hot 100 (Billboard) | 51 |
| Czech Republic Airplay (ČNS IFPI) | 5 |
| Finland Airplay (Radiosoittolista) | 9 |
| Finland Download (Latauslista) | 19 |
| France (SNEP) | 26 |
| Germany (GfK) | 1 |
| Hungary (Rádiós Top 40) | 4 |
| Hungary (Single Top 40) | 7 |
| Ireland (IRMA) | 13 |
| Israel International Airplay (Media Forest) | 2 |
| Italy (FIMI) | 9 |
| Luxembourg Digital Songs (Billboard) | 1 |
| Netherlands (Single Top 100) | 52 |
| New Zealand (Recorded Music NZ) | 8 |
| Poland Airplay (ZPAV) | 15 |
| Scottish Singles Sales (Official Charts) | 11 |
| Slovakia Airplay (ČNS IFPI) | 41 |
| Slovenia (SloTop50) | 1 |
| Spain (Promusicae) | 30 |
| Sweden (Sverigetopplistan) | 42 |
| Switzerland (Schweizer Hitparade) | 1 |
| UK Singles (Official Charts) | 4 |
| US Adult Pop Airplay (Billboard) | 31 |
| US Adult Contemporary (Billboard) | 26 |

=== Year-end charts ===
Annual chart rankings
| Chart (2013) | Position |
|---|---|
| Australia (ARIA) | 56 |
| Austria (Ö3 Austria Top 40) | 58 |
| Belgium (Ultratop Wallonia) | 88 |
| Germany (Media Control AG) | 32 |
| Hungary (Rádiós Top 40) | 88 |
| Italy (FIMI) | 49 |
| Slovenia (SloTop50) | 10 |
| Switzerland (Schweizer Hitparade) | 48 |
| UK Singles (OCC) | 80 |

| Chart (2014) | Position |
|---|---|
| Slovenia (SloTop50) | 23 |

=== Certifications ===
Certifications and sales
| Region | Certification | Certified units/sales |
|---|---|---|
| Australia (ARIA) | 3× Platinum | 210,000^{^} |
| Austria (IFPI Austria) | Gold | 15,000^{*} |
| Canada (Music Canada) | Gold | 40,000^{*} |
| Denmark (IFPI Danmark) | Gold | 45,000^{‡} |
| Germany (BVMI) | Platinum | 300,000^{^} |
| Italy (FIMI) | Platinum | 30,000^{*} |
| New Zealand (RMNZ) | Platinum | 15,000^{*} |
| Spain (Promusicae) | Gold | 30,000^{‡} |
| Sweden (GLF) | Platinum | 40,000^{‡} |
| Switzerland (IFPI Switzerland) | Platinum | 30,000^{^} |
| United Kingdom (BPI) | 2× Platinum | 1,200,000^{‡} |
^{*} Sales figures based on certification alone.^{^} Shipments figures based on certification alone.^{‡} Sales+streaming figures based on certification alone.

== Personnel ==
- Smith Carlson - Engineer
