= Bartender (James Blunt song) =

Single by James Blunt

from the album The Afterlove
- Released: 10 March 2017
- Recorded: 2016
- Genre: Pop
- Length: 3:13
- Label: Atlantic Records UK
- Songwriter(s): James Blunt; Teddy Geiger; Steph Jones; Daniel Parker
- Producer(s): Teddy Geiger; Daniel Parker

James Blunt singles chronology
"Love Me Better" (2017)	"Bartender" (2017)	"OK" (2017)

Music video
- "Bartender" on YouTube

"Bartender" is a song recorded by British singer-songwriter James Blunt. It was released on 10 March 2017 as the second single from his fifth studio album, The Afterlove (2017). The song was written by James Blunt, Teddy Geiger, Steph Jones and Daniel Parker.

== Music video ==
An accompanying music video directed by Declan Whitebloom was released onto YouTube on 10 March 2017 at a total length of three minutes and twenty-nine seconds.

== Track listing ==
Digital download
No.	Title	Length
1.	"Bartender"	3:13

== Charts ==
Chart (2017)	Peak position
Belgium (Ultratip Bubbling Under Wallonia)	17

== Release history ==
Region	Date	Format	Label
United Kingdom	10 March 2017	Digital download	Atlantic Records UK
