= Chasing Time: The Bedlam Sessions =

Live album by James Blunt
- Released: 13 February 2006
- Recorded: 18 November 2005; 13 December 2005
- Venue: BBC Elstree Centre, Borehamwood; St. James' Church, Dingle
- Genre: Soft rock, folk rock
- Length: 47:38 (CD); 65:02 (DVD)
- Label: Atlantic
- Producer: Alison Howe

James Blunt chronology
Back to Bedlam (2004)	Chasing Time: The Bedlam Sessions (2006)	All the Lost Souls (2007)

Professional ratings
Review scores
Source	Rating
Allmusic	3/5 stars
Teentoday.co.uk	3/5 stars

Chasing Time: The Bedlam Sessions is a live album and DVD released by James Blunt in 2006 as a follow-up to his 2004 debut album, Back to Bedlam. The set contains a live album from Ireland, as well as a DVD featuring a recorded performance at the BBC, music videos for "High", "You're Beautiful", "Wisemen" and "Goodbye My Lover", and interviews taken from various television appearances and studio sessions. The audio CD was also included as part of a deluxe package of Back to Bedlam that was available in the United States, thus meaning that this release was not issued there.

== Track listing ==
Disc One - DVD

1. "Billy" (Blunt, Ghost, Skarbek) – 3:46
2. "High" (Blunt, Ross) – 3:55
3. "Wisemen" (Blunt, Hogarth, Skarbek) – 3:49
4. "Goodbye My Lover" (Blunt, Skarbek) – 4:18
5. "Tears And Rain" (Blunt, Chambers) – 4:17
6. "Out of My Mind" (Blunt, Skarbek) - 3:18
7. "So Long, Jimmy" (Blunt, Hogarth) – 5:25
8. "You're Beautiful" (Blunt, Ghost, Skarbek) – 3:38
9. "Cry" (Blunt, Skarbek) – 3:44
10. "No Bravery" (Blunt, Skarbek) – 3:36
11. "Where Is My Mind?" (Francis, Black) – 4:07
12. "High" (Video) - 4:03
13. "High" (The Making of the Video)
14. "Wisemen" (Video) - 4:00
15. "Wisemen" (The Making of the Video)
16. "You're Beautiful" (Video) - 3:23
17. "You're Beautiful" (The Making of the Video)
18. "High" (2005 Video) - 4:02
19. "High" (The Making of the 2005 Video)
20. "Goodbye My Lover" (Video) - 4:19
21. "Goodbye My Lover" (The Making of the Video)
22. "Being Blunt" (Documentary)
23. "Interview & Photo Gallery"

Disc Two - CD

1. "Wisemen" (Blunt, Hogarth, Skarbek) – 3:49
2. "High" (Blunt, Ross) – 3:55
3. "Cry" (Blunt, Skarbek) – 3:44
4. "Goodbye My Lover" (Blunt, Skarbek) – 4:18
5. "So Long, Jimmy" (Blunt, Hogarth) – 5:25
6. "Sugar Coated" (Blunt, Hogarth, Skarbek) – 3:51
7. "You're Beautiful" (Blunt, Ghost, Skarbek) – 3:38
8. "Billy" (Blunt, Ghost, Skarbek) – 3:46
9. "Fall at Your Feet" (Neil Finn) – 2:42
10. "Tears And Rain" (Blunt, Chambers) – 4:17
11. "No Bravery" (Blunt, Skarbek) – 3:36
12. "Where Is My Mind?" (Francis, Black) – 4:07

== Personnel ==
- Paul Beard – keyboards, vocals
- James Blunt – acoustic guitar, keyboards, vocals
- Karl Brazil – drums
- Mark Jonathan Davis – director
- Valerie Etienne – vocals
- Dan Fitzgerald – engineer
- Paul Fredericks – vocals
- Joe Garland – vocals
- Phil Heyes – director
- Alison Howe – producer
- Mary Ellen Matthews – cover photo
- Malcolm Moore – bass, vocals
- Brian Murray – guitar technician
- Tim Summerhayes – mixing
- Dennie Vidal – engineer

== Charts ==
Music DVD Charts

Chart (2006)	Peak position
Belgian Music DVD Chart	1
German Music DVD Chart	1
Swedish Music DVD Chart	3
UK Music DVD Chart	1
ARIA Music DVD Chart	1

Album Charts

Chart (2006)	Peak position
New Zealand Albums Chart	1
Italian Albums Chart	1
Swiss Albums Chart	2
French Albums Chart	8
Polish Albums Chart	36

== Certifications ==
Region	Certification	Certified units/sales
Australia (ARIA) video	5× Platinum	75,000^{^}
New Zealand (RMNZ) video	2× Platinum	10,000^{^}
^{^} Shipments figures based on certification alone.
