= Sacha Skarbek =

British songwriter and producer (born 1972)

- Born: 29 May 1972 (age 54); London, England
- Genres: Pop, pop rock, dance-pop
- Occupations: Songwriter, record producer, composer, multi-instrumentalist, educator
- Instruments: Keyboards, piano, vocals
- Years active: 1990s–present
- Website: skarbekacademy.com

Sacha Skarbek (born 29 May 1972) is an English songwriter, record producer, composer, and multi-instrumentalist. A two-time Ivor Novello Award recipient and Grammy Award winner, he is best known for co-writing multi-platinum international hits, including James Blunt's "You're Beautiful" and "Goodbye My Lover", as well as Miley Cyrus's US Billboard Hot 100 number-one single "Wrecking Ball".

His writing and production credits span work with artists such as Adele, Lana Del Rey, Alec Benjamin and Tears for Fears.

In 2025, he received a Golden Globe Award nomination for co-writing "Forbidden Road" for the Robbie Williams biographical film Better Man. In 2026, he won a Grammy Award for his contributions to FKA Twigs's album Eusexua.

In addition to his commercial music career, Skarbek heads White Rope Music, Amadeus Publishing, and the Skarbek Songwriting Academy.

== Early Life and Education ==
Skarbek was raised in London. A classically trained musician, he studied piano under the concert pianist Ronald Smith. He attended Northbourne Park School and The King's School, Canterbury, on music scholarships before earning a degree in music from Oxford Brookes University. He later completed a Master's degree in Music Education and Entrepreneurship.

During his early career, Skarbek worked as a touring keyboardist and musical director for artists including Neneh Cherry, Beverley Knight, Alisha's Attic, and Jon Bon Jovi.

== Songwriting and Production Career ==
In the early 2000s, Skarbek collaborated closely with James Blunt, co-writing six tracks on Blunt's multi-platinum debut album Back to Bedlam (2004). These included the global chart-topping single "You're Beautiful" along with "Goodbye My Lover" and "Wisemen". The album's international success earned Skarbek two Ivor Novello Awards. Blunt later credited Skarbek's musical guidance during their initial sessions with helping shape his craft as a songwriter.

In 2008, Skarbek co-wrote "Cold Shoulder" for Adele's debut studio album, 19. Over the following decade, his contributions spanned major releases including Jason Mraz's We Sing. We Dance. We Steal Things. (2008), Lana Del Rey's Born to Die (2012), and AURORA's Infections of a Different Kind (Step 1) (2018). In 2013, he co-wrote Miley Cyrus's single "Wrecking Ball" alongside Mozella and Stephan Moccio, which topped the US Billboard Hot 100 and achieved multi-platinum certifications worldwide.

Skarbek worked extensively with Tears for Fears on their comeback album The Tipping Point (2022). In 2024, he co-wrote "Forbidden Road" with Robbie Williams and Freddy Wexler for the biographical musical film Better Man. The track earned him a Golden Globe nomination for Best Original Song – Motion Picture at the 82nd Annual Golden Globe Awards in January 2025.

At the 68th Annual Grammy Awards in 2026, Skarbek won Best Dance/Electronic Album for his songwriting work on FKA Twigs's studio album Eusexua.

== Artist Development and Business Ventures ==
Throughout his career, Skarbek has focused on emerging talent and artist incubation. He played a formative role in developing acts such as Alec Benjamin, co-writing early singles including "Paper Crown" ahead of Benjamin's commercial breakthrough, as well as artists Julie Falcon and Yandani.

In 2012, Skarbek founded White Rope Music, an independent production house dedicated to artist incubation and creative development. He also co-founded Amadeus Publishing in partnership with Bucks Music Group, administering and developing catalogues for emerging producers and songwriters.

== Skarbek Songwriting Academy ==
Skarbek established the Skarbek Songwriting Academy, a London-based educational initiative running masterclasses internationally. Designed to democratise professional songwriting experience for creators from diverse socioeconomic backgrounds, the academy balances commercial songwriting mechanics with an emphasis on mental health and the psychological pressures of the modern music industry.

In 2026, the academy partnered with the UK mental health charity SANE to establish the SANE & Skarbek Songwriting Academy Award, an annual nationwide bursary and mentorship programme supporting emerging songwriters overcoming personal challenges and mental health difficulties. His mentorship work has drawn praise across the industry; songwriter Gary Barlow described Skarbek as a "true songsmith" whose dedication provides vital craft and business guidance for the next generation of songwriters.

== Film and Television Composition ==
Beyond commercial pop songwriting, Skarbek composes and supervises film scores. In addition to his 2025 Golden Globe Award nomination for co-writing "Forbidden Road" for the Robbie Williams biographical film Better Man, he composed and music-supervised the 2012 documentary For No Good Reason, directed by Charlie Paul and featuring Johnny Depp and artist Ralph Steadman. He also collaborated with Starsailor frontman James Walsh on the soundtrack adaptation for Chuck Palahniuk's novel Lullaby.

== Personal Life ==
Skarbek is the son of Polish-British psychotherapist Andrzej Skarbek and British investigative journalist Marjorie Wallace, who was appointed a CBE for founding the mental health charity SANE. His brother, Stefan Skarbek, is also an established music producer and songwriter.

He is the grand-nephew of Krystyna Skarbek (also known as Christine Granville), a decorated Polish-born operative for Britain's Special Operations Executive (SOE) during World War II. Renowned as Winston Churchill's "favourite spy," she was awarded the George Medal and the Croix de Guerre, and served as the direct real-life inspiration for Ian Fleming's character Vesper Lynd in the first James Bond novel, Casino Royale (1953).

== Key Awards and Nominations ==
Year	Award	Category	Nominated Work	Result
2006	Ivor Novello Awards	PRS Most Performed Work	"You're Beautiful" (James Blunt)	Won
2006	Ivor Novello Awards	International Hit of the Year	"You're Beautiful" (James Blunt)	Won
2025	Golden Globe Awards	Best Original Song – Motion Picture	"Forbidden Road" (Better Man)	Nominated
2026	Grammy Awards	Best Dance/Electronic Album	Eusexua (FKA Twigs)	Won

== Songwriting and Production Credits (Singles and Tracks) ==
Year	Artist	Album / Release	Song	Credit
2025	FKA Twigs	Eusexua	(Album tracks)	Writer
2024	Robbie Williams	Better Man (Original Motion Picture Soundtrack)	"Forbidden Road"	Writer
2023	Quarry	Object	"Kind Of Hoping"	Writer
2022	Tears for Fears	The Tipping Point	"Please Be Happy"	Writer, Piano
2022	Tears For Fears	The Tipping Point	"Long, Long, Long Time"	Vocal Production
2022	Tears For Fears	The Tipping Point	"The Tipping Point"	Producer
2022	Tears For Fears	The Tipping Point	"End Of Night"	Producer
2022	Tears For Fears	The Tipping Point	"Stay"	Producer
2022	Tears For Fears	The Tipping Point	"My Demons"	Writer, Producer
2022	Tears For Fears	The Tipping Point	"Shame"	Writer, Producer
2022	Tears For Fears	The Tipping Point	"Secret Location"	Writer, Producer
2022	Alec Benjamin	"Paper Crown" (Single)	"Paper Crown"	Writer, Producer
2022	James Bay	Leap	"Silent Love"	Writer, Producer
2022	Roachford	Once In A Lifetime	"Better"	Writer, Producer
2021	Ilse DeLange	"I Will Help You" (Single)	"I Will Help You"	Writer
2021	Imelda May	11 Past the Hour	"Diamonds"	Writer
2020	Melanie C	Melanie C	"End of Everything"	Writer
2020	Jason Mraz	Look for the Good	"Gratitude"	Writer
2020	Zig Mentality	The Sesh (EP)	"Sesh On"	Writer, Producer
2020	Zig Mentality	The Sesh (EP)	"If You Ever"	Writer, Producer
2020	Zig Mentality	The Sesh (EP)	"Stoned Love"	Writer, Producer
2020	Zig Mentality	The Sesh (EP)	"Who Do You Work For"	Writer, Producer
2020	Zig Mentality	The Sesh (EP)	"Pretty Girls On Bikes"	Writer, Producer
2020	Tenille Townes	The Lemonade Stand	"Find You"	Writer
2019	James Bay	Oh My Messy Mind (EP)	"Break My Heart Right"	Writer, Producer
2019	Loïc Nottet	"29" (Single)	"29"	Writer
2018	AURORA	Infections of a Different Kind (Step 1)	"It Happened Quiet"	Writer
2018	Alec Benjamin	Narrated for You	"1994"	Producer
2018	Alec Benjamin	Narrated for You	"Water Fountain"	Producer
2018	dubé	"Stoned Love" (Single)	"Stoned Love"	Producer
2018	dubé	"Who Do You Work For" (Single)	"Who Do You Work For"	Producer
2018	Millie Turner	"The Shadow" (Single)	"The Shadow"	Writer
2018	Millie Turner	"Night Running" (Single)	"Night Running"	Writer
2018	Noah Kahan	Hurt Somebody (EP)	"Passenger"	Writer
2018	Loïc Nottet	Sillygomania	"On Fire"	Writer
2017	Tears For Fears	Rule the World: The Greatest Hits	"Stay"	Producer
2017	Tears For Fears	Rule the World: The Greatest Hits	"I Love You but I'm Lost"	Producer
2017	Mighty Oaks	Dreamers	"The Great Unknown"	Writer
2017	dubé	"Pretty Girls on Bikes" (Single)	"Pretty Girls on Bikes"	Writer, Producer
2017	dubé	"Alien" (Single)	"Alien"	Writer, Producer
2017	Albert Gold	Oxygen (EP)	"Oxygen"	Writer, Producer
2016	Nause	"Dynamite" (Single)	"Dynamite" (ft. Pretty Sister)	Writer
2016	Gavin James	Bitter Pill	"Bitter Pill"	Writer
2016	Gavin James	Bitter Pill	"Till The Sun Comes Up"	Writer
2016	Jessie Ware	Me Before You (OST)	"Till The End"	Writer
2016	Graham Candy	Plan A	"Heart of Gold"	Writer
2016	Netsky	3	"Forget What You Look Like"	Writer, Producer
2016	All Saints	Red Flag	"Who Hurt Who"	Writer
2016	Alec Benjamin	"End of the Summer" (Single)	"End of the Summer"	Producer
2015	Gabrielle Aplin	Light Up the Dark	"Shallow Love"	Writer
2015	Gabrielle Aplin	Light Up the Dark	"Together"	Writer
2015	Alle Farben	Get High (EP)	"Get High"	Writer, Producer
2015	Duffy	Legend (OST)	"Whole Lot of Love"	Writer
2014	Alec Benjamin	"Paper Crown" (Single)	"Paper Crown"	Writer, Producer
2013	Miley Cyrus	Bangerz	"Wrecking Ball"	Writer
2013	Darin	Exit	"Surrender"	Writer
2013	Backstreet Boys	In a World Like This	"Madeleine"	Writer
2013	Karise Eden	"Thread of Silence" (Single)	"Thread of Silence"	Writer
2012	Lana Del Rey	Born to Die	"Without You"	Writer
2012	Engelbert Humperdinck	"Love Will Set You Free" (Single)	"Love Will Set You Free"	Writer, Producer
2012	Lisa Marie Presley	Storm & Grace	"You Ain't Seen Nothin' Yet"	Writer
2012	Lisa Marie Presley	Storm & Grace	"Close to the Edge"	Writer
2012	Lisa Marie Presley	Storm & Grace	"So Long"	Writer
2012	Lisa Marie Presley	Storm & Grace	"Un-break"	Writer
2012	Ilse DeLange	Eye of the Hurricane	"Hurricane"	Writer
2012	Ilse DeLange	Eye of the Hurricane	"Time Will Have To Wait"	Writer
2012	Ilse DeLange	Eye of the Hurricane	"Fold This World"	Writer
2011	Christina Perri	The Ocean Way Sessions	"Daydream"	Writer
2011	Ilse DeLange	Next to Me	"Almost"	Writer
2011	Ilse DeLange	Next to Me	"Carousel"	Writer
2011	Ilse DeLange	Next to Me	"Untouchable"	Writer
2011	Greyson Chance	Hold On 'til the Night	"Little London Girl"	Writer
2011	Milow	North and South	"Never Gonna Stop"	Writer
2011	Jason Mraz	Love Is a Four Letter Word	"Frank D. Fixer"	Writer
2011	Jason Mraz	Love Is a Four Letter Word	"In Your Hands"	Writer
2011	Charlotte OC	For Kenny	"The Rose"	Writer, Producer
2011	Charlotte OC	For Kenny	"Shout It Out"	Writer, Producer
2011	Charlotte OC	For Kenny	"Take Me Away"	Writer, Producer
2011	Charlotte OC	For Kenny	"Treasure Island"	Writer, Producer
2011	Charlotte OC	For Kenny	"Shine On"	Writer, Producer
2011	Charlotte OC	For Kenny	"Head Rush"	Writer, Producer
2011	Charlotte OC	For Kenny	"Closer"	Writer, Producer
2011	Charlotte OC	For Kenny	"Anybody Else"	Writer, Producer
2010	Train	Save Me, San Francisco	"The Finish Line"	Writer
2010	James Walsh	Live at the Top of the World (EP)	"Live at the Top of the World"	Writer, Producer
2010	The Boy Who Trapped the Sun	Dreaming Like a Fool	"Sunken City"	Writer
2010	Gin Wigmore	Holy Smoke	"I Do"	Writer
2009	Joss Stone	Colour Me Free!	"Stalemate"	Producer
2009	Ben's Brother	Battling Giants	"Questions & Answers"	Writer, Producer
2009	Tyrone Wells	Remain	"Before It Started"	Writer
2009	Ben's Brother ft. Anastacia	"Stalemate" (Single)	"Stalemate"	Producer
2009	Jason Mraz	Life Is Good (EP)	"San Disco Reggaefornia"	Writer
2009	Jason Mraz	Life Is Good (EP)	"Up"	Writer
2009	Dawn Kinnard	Amazon Tribe	"Loves Is My New Drug"	Writer
2008	Ilse DeLange	Incredible	"Broken Girl"	Writer, Producer
2008	Ilse DeLange	Incredible	"Miracle"	Writer, Producer
2008	Ilse DeLange	Incredible	"The Other Side"	Writer, Producer
2008	Ilse DeLange	Incredible	"So Incredible"	Writer
2008	Amie Miriello	I Came Around	"Hey"	Writer, Producer
2008	Amie Miriello	I Came Around	"Beauty of Goodbye"	Writer, Producer
2008	Jason Mraz	We Sing. We Dance. We Steal Things.	"Love for a Child"	Writer
2008	Jason Mraz	We Sing. We Dance. We Steal Things.	"Only Human"	Writer
2008	Jason Mraz	We Sing. We Dance. We Steal Things.	"If It Kills Me"	Writer
2008	Adele	19	"Cold Shoulder"	Writer
2008	Duffy	Rockferry	"Save It For Your Prayers"	Writer, Producer
2007	Ben's Brother	Beta Male Fairytales	"Beauty Queen"	Writer
2006	James Blunt	Chasing Time: The Bedlam Sessions	"Out of My Mind"	Writer
2006	James Blunt	Chasing Time: The Bedlam Sessions	"Sugar Coated"	Writer
2004	James Blunt	Back to Bedlam	"You're Beautiful"	Writer
2004	James Blunt	Back to Bedlam	"Wisemen"	Writer
2004	James Blunt	Back to Bedlam	"Goodbye My Lover"	Writer
2004	James Blunt	Back to Bedlam	"Billy"	Writer
2004	James Blunt	Back to Bedlam	"Cry"	Writer
2004	James Blunt	Back to Bedlam	"No Bravery"	Writer
2004	Cherie	Cherie	"I'm Ready"	Writer
2002	L5	Retiens-Moi	"Reste Encore"	Writer
2000	Samantha Mumba	Gotta Tell You	"Body II Body"	Writer, Producer
2000	Amanda Ghost	Ghost Stories	"Idol"	Writer, Producer
2000	Amanda Ghost	Ghost Stories	"Glory Girl"	Writer
2000	Amanda Ghost	Ghost Stories	"The Wrong Man"	Writer, Producer
2000	Amanda Ghost	Ghost Stories	"Cellophane"	Writer
2000	Amanda Ghost	Ghost Stories	"Blind Man"	Writer
2000	Amanda Ghost	Ghost Stories	"Empty"	Writer
2000	Amanda Ghost	Ghost Stories	"Numb"	Writer
1998	Beverley Knight	Prodigal Sista	"Good Morning World"	Writer

== Albums and EPs (Full Project Credits) ==
Year	Artist	Album / EP	Credit
2015	Kelvin Jones	Stop the Moment	Writer, Producer
2015	Peter Aristone	Gold (EP)	Writer, Producer
2013	Alec Benjamin	America (EP)	Writer, Producer
2013	Shannon Wardrop	Medicine	Producer
2012	James Walsh	Lullaby	Writer, Producer
2010	Charlotte Church	Back to Scratch	Writer, Producer
2009	Waylon	Wicked Ways	Writer, Producer
2008	Tristan Prettyman	Hello...x	Writer, Producer
2008	Double O Zero	We Are Not A Band	Producer
