= Who We Used to Be Tour =

2024 concert tour by James Blunt

- Tour by James Blunt
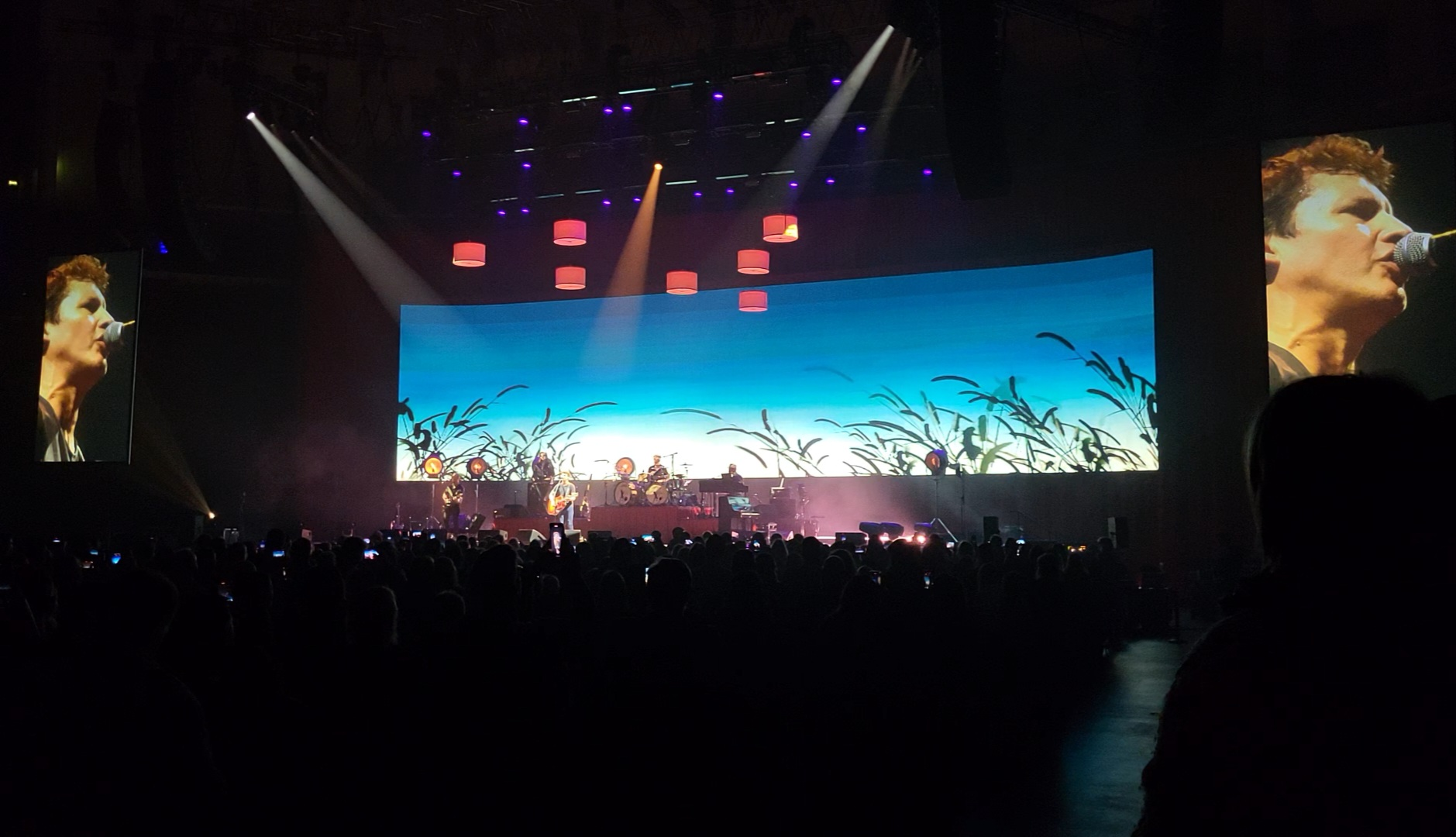
- Blunt performing in Hanover
- Associated album: Who We Used to Be
- Start date: 9 February 2024
- End date: 15 December 2024
- Legs: 9
- No. of shows: 91

James Blunt concert chronology
- The Stars Beneath My Feet Tour (2022); Who We Used to Be Tour (2024); Back to Bedlam 20th Anniversary Tour (2025)

The Who We Used to Be Tour was a concert tour by English musician James Blunt.

== Background ==
After Blunt announced his new album Who We Used to Be in August 2023, he also announced his new tour. He announced the tour in a video from the bathtub on his social media accounts. He said: "I can't even put into words how much I'm looking forward to going on tour again in 2024. It's been so much fun writing and recording my new album and some of the new songs will undoubtedly get you on your feet and dancing again. I'm already looking forward to crowd surfing with you!"

In November 2023, Blunt added his first concerts in Australia in six years to the tour.

James Blunt announced that he will go on tour again after the Who We Used to Be Tour in spring 2025 to celebrate the 20th anniversary of his debut album Back to Bedlam.

== Tour dates ==
List of 2024 concerts
Date	City	Country	Venue
9 February 2024	Al Atheeb	Saudi Arabia	Maraya قاعة مرايا
20 February 2024	Rennes	France	Le Liberte
21 February 2024	Lille	France	Zénith de Lille
23 February 2024	Bruxelles	Belgium	Palais 12
24 February 2024	Amsterdam	Netherlands	AFAS Live
25 February 2024	Esch-Sur-Alzette	Luxembourg	Rockhal
27 February 2024	Le Petit-Quevilly	France	Zénith de Rouen
28 February 2024	Paris	France	Zénith de Paris
1 March 2024	Zürich	Switzerland	Hallenstadion
2 March 2024	Milan	Italy	Mediolanum Forum
4 March 2024	Prague	Czech Republic	Forum Karlin
5 March 2024	Budapest	Hungary	MVM Dome
6 March 2024	Bratislava	Slovakia	Ondrej Nepela Arena
8 March 2024	Innsbruck	Austria	Olympiahalle
9 March 2024	Munich	Germany	Olympiahalle
10 March 2024	Stuttgart	Germany	Hanns-Martin-Schleyer-Halle
11 March 2024	Kempten	Germany	bigBOX Allgäu
13 March 2024	Nuremberg	Germany	Arena Nürnberger Versicherung
14 March 2024	Frankfurt	Germany	Festhalle
15 March 2024	Cologne	Germany	Lanxess Arena
16 March 2024	Oberhausen	Germany	Rudolf Weber-Arena
18 March 2024	Mannheim	Germany	SAP Arena
20 March 2024	Berlin	Germany	Uber Arena
21 March 2024	Leipzig	Germany	Quarterback Immobilien Arena
22 March 2024	Hamburg	Germany	Barclays Arena
23 March 2024	Hanover	Germany	ZAG Arena
25 March 2024	Dijon	France	Le Zénith de Dijon
26 March 2024	Floirac	France	Arkéa Arena
27 March 2024	Lyon	France	Halle Tony-Garnier
30 March 2024	Leeds	England	First Direct Arena
31 March 2024	Bristol	England	Bristol Beacon
2 April 2024	Brighton	England	Brighton Centre
4 April 2024	Newcastle upon Tyne	England	Utilita Arena
5 April 2024	Glasgow	Scotland	OVO Hydro
6 April 2024	Nottingham	England	Motorpoint Arena
7 April 2024	Birmingham	England	Utilita Arena
9 April 2024	London	England	Royal Albert Hall
10 April 2024	London	England	Royal Albert Hall
12 April 2024	Manchester	England	AO Arena
13 April 2024	Cardiff	Wales	Utilita Arena Cardiff
14 April 2024	Bournemouth	England	Bournemouth International Centre
23 May 2024	Doha	Qatar	Doha Golf Club
24 May 2024	Dubai	United Arab Emirates	Coca-Cola Arena
30 May 2024	Gmunden	Austria	Rathausplatz
31 May 2024	Krems an der Donau	Austria	FESTival am Steinertor 2024
7 June 2024	Casablanca	Morocco	Jazzablanca Festival
3 July 2024	Nibe	Denmark	Skalskoven
5 July 2024	Bad Mergentheim	Germany	Residenzschloss Mergentheim
7 July 2024	Helsinki	Finland	BÖLE Arena & Club
10 July 2024	Warsaw	Poland	COS Torwar Hall Spectacular
12 July 2024	Dresden	Germany	Junge Garde
13 July 2024	Weert	Netherlands	Bospop Festival 2024
15 July 2024	Cannes	France	Palais des Festivals
16 July 2024	Nîmes	France	Arena of Nîmes
17 July 2024	Barcelona	Spain	Poble Espanyol
19 July 2024	Alcant	Spain	Festival Alicante Goldest
20 July 2024	Chiclana de la Frontera	Spain	Concert Music Festival 2024
22 July 2024	Madrid	Spain	Noches del Botanico
23 July 2024	Palma	Spain	23 July 2024
25 July 2024	Annecy	France	L’Arcadium
26 July 2024	Colmar	France	Foire Aux Vins de d'Alsace 2024
28 July 2024	Lingen	Germany	EmslandArena
30 July 2024	Mörbisch am See	Austria	Seebühne Mörbisch
1 August 2024	Salem	Austria	Schloss Salem Open Airs
2 August 2024	Weil am Rhein	Germany	STIMMEN 2024
4 August 2024	Wolfsburg	Germany	Autostadt Summer
24 August 2024	Dublin	Ireland	National Museum of Ireland
25 August 2024	Luimneach	Ireland	Docklands
28 August 2024	Gießen	Germany	Germany
29 August 2024	Neu-Ulm	Germany	Sport- und Freizeitpark Wiley
30 August 2024	Arbon	Switzerland	SummerDays Festival 2024
31 August 2024	Spiez	Switzerland	Seaside Festival 2024
1 September 2024	Bochum	Germany	Zeltfestival Ruhr 2024
5 September 2024	Cahors	France	Le Lot en Meule Bleue 2024
6 September 2024	Thuir	France	Pellicu-Live
12 September 2024	Cape Town	South Africa	Grand Arena at GrandWest
14 September 2024	Pretoria	South Africa	SunBet Arena Time Square
21 November 2024	Brisbane	Australia	Riverstage
23 November 2024	Sydney	Australia	Aware Super Theatre
24 November 2024	Melbourne	Australia	Rod Laver Arena
25 November 2024	Adelaide	Australia	Adelaide Entertainment Centre
28 November 2024	Perth	Australia	Red Hill Auditorium
1 December 2024	Khet Ban Kapi	Thailand	MCC Hall The Mall Bangkapi
3 December 2024	Taipei	Taiwan	Zepp New Taipei
5 December 2024	Shanghai	China	Mercedes-Benz Arena
7 December 2024	Guangzhou	China	Baoneng Stadium
8 December 2024	Beijing	China	Capital Stadium
10 December 2024	Chengdu	China	Phoenix Mountain Stadium
12 December 2024	Hong Kong		Asia World-Expo Hall
14 December 2024	Xiamen	China	Strait Grand Theater
15 December 2024	Nan Jing Shi	China	Nanjing Olympic Sports Center Gymnasium
