= Airplane Mode (album) =

Studio album by James Blunt
- Released: 6 November 2026
- Recorded: 2026
- Studios: Banbury, Oxfordshire (Pig Music Studios)
- Length: 41:59
- Label: Atlantic
- Producers: Afterhrs; Jonny Coffer; Matt Cooke; Mark Crew; Mikky Ekko; Michael Hemmings; Red Triangle; Eg White

James Blunt chronology
Who We Used to Be (2023)	Airplane Mode (2026)

Singles from Airplane Mode
- 1. "Tastes Like Summer" Released: 14 August 2026; 2. "Weight of It All" Released: 3 September 2026; 3. "Circles" Released: 2 October 2026

Airplane Mode is the eighth studio album by English singer James Blunt, released on 6 November 2026 through Atlantic Records. It was preceded by the release of three singles: "Tastes Like Summer", "Weight of It All" and "Circles".

== Promotion ==
=== Singles ===
Blunt released the album's lead single, "Tastes Like Summer", on 14 August 2026. The single peaked at number 11 on the UK Singles Sales chart. The second single, "Weight of It All", was released on the same day as the album announcement, 3 September 2026.

=== Tour ===
On the same day as the album announcement, Blunt announced the Airplane Mode Tour, which is due to begin in Luxembourg in February 2027.

== Commercial performance ==
Airplane Mode sold 26,318 copies in the United Kingdom in the first week of release, and charted at number one on that country's Album Chart.

== Track listing ==
Airplane Mode track listing
No.	Title	Writer(s)	Producer(s)	Length
1.	"Circles"	James Blunt	Red Triangle	3:52
2.	"Time to Time"	Blunt; Mark Crew; Wayne Hector	Crew	3:35
3.	"Modern Love"	Blunt; Jonathan Coffer; Johan Arjona; Mike Needle	Coffer; Matt Cooke; Michael Hemmings	3:15
4.	"Tastes Like Summer"	Blunt; Richard Parkhouse; George Tizzard	Red Triangle	3:39
5.	"Weight of It All"	Blunt; Mikky Ekko; Ian Franzino; Andrew Haas	Afterhrs; Ekko	3:46
6.	"Reason to Die"	Blunt; Parkhouse; Tizzard	Red Triangle	3:07
7.	"Hey, People"	Blunt; Parkhouse; Tizzard	Red Triangle	3:40
8.	"In Your Blood"	Blunt; Crew; Johan Arjona; Hector	Crew	3:02
9.	"Leftover Time"	Blunt; Coffer; Ed Drewett	Coffer	2:53
10.	"Dancing in My Head"	Blunt; Nick Atkinson; Edd Holloway; Parkhouse; Steve Robson; Tizzard	Red Triangle	3:45
11.	"Oh, Daisy"	Blunt; Jonny Lattimer; Francis White	Eg White	3:42
12.	"This Is Not Forever"	Blunt; Parkhouse; Tizzard	Red Triangle	3:43
Total length:				41:59

Deluxe edition tracks
No.	Title	Writer(s)	Producer(s)	Length
13.	"Losing You Was Easy"	Blunt; Tizzard; Parkhouse	Red Triangle	3:50
14.	"You Never Learn, Do Ya?"	Blunt; Tizzard; Parkhouse	Red Triangle	3:34
15.	"A Little Longer"	Blunt; Haas; Franzino; JP Saxe		2:42
16.	"Don't Leave a Light On"	Blunt; Tizzard; Parkhouse	Red Triangle	3:28

== Personnel ==
Credits are adapted from Tidal.

=== Musicians ===
- James Blunt – lead vocals
- Paul Sayer – electric guitar (all tracks), acoustic guitar (track 8), backing vocals (11)
- Chris Pemberton – piano (1, 4–6, 8, 10–12), backing vocals (2, 8), keyboards (2), Rhodes piano (6, 7), Juno synthesizer (6), Wurlitzer (7, 12), synthesizer (7)
- John Garrison – bass (1, 2, 4–8, 11, 12), backing vocals (2, 7, 8, 11)
- Karl Brazil – drums (1, 2, 4–8, 11, 12), backing vocals (11)
- George Tizzard – acoustic guitar (1, 4, 6, 7, 12), backing vocals (1, 6, 7, 10), electric guitar (1, 6, 7, 12), bass (1), percussion (4); drums, guitars, strings (10)
- Richard Parkhouse – programming (1, 4, 6, 7, 12), strings (1, 6, 12), bass (4, 6, 10), synthesizer (4, 12), percussion (10)
- Mark Crew – keyboards, programming (2, 8)
- Jonny Coffer – bass, electric guitar, piano (3, 9)
- Michael Hemmings – drums (3)
- Mark Brown – saxophone (4)
- Andrew Haas – backing vocals, drums, electric guitar, keyboards, piano (5)
- Ian Franzino – backing vocals, drums, keyboards (5)
- Mikky Ekko – backing vocals (5)
- Will Gardner – string arrangement (9)
- Rachael Lander – cello (9)
- Emma Owens – viola (9)
- Rachel Robson – viola (9)
- Dan Oates – violin (9)
- Kirsty Mangan – violin (9)
- Matthew Ward – violin (9)
- Paloma Deike – violin (9)
- Sam Kennedy – violin (9)
- Paul Beard – organ, piano (10)
- Eg White – acoustic guitar, backing vocals, cavaquinho, percussion (11)

=== Technical ===
- Sam Miller – engineering (1, 3, 4, 6, 7, 10–12), additional engineering (2, 8)
- Mark Crew – engineering (2, 8)
- Matt Cooke – engineering (3, 9)
- Andrew Haas – engineering (5)
- Ian Franzino – engineering (5)
- Jay Reynolds – mastering (all tracks), mixing (1, 2, 4–12)
- Jonny Coffer – mixing (3)

== Charts ==
Chart performance for Airplane Mode
Chart (2026)	Peak position
Australian Albums (ARIA)	9
Austrian Albums (Ö3 Austria)	5
Belgian Albums (Ultratop Flanders)	42
Belgian Albums (Ultratop Wallonia)	15
Dutch Albums (Album Top 100)	28
French Albums (SNEP)	84
German Albums (Offizielle Top 100)	9
German Pop Albums (Offizielle Top 100)	5
Hungarian Albums (MAHASZ)	22
Irish Albums (Official Charts)	27
New Zealand Albums (RMNZ)	16
Scottish Albums (Official Charts)	3
Swiss Albums (Schweizer Hitparade)	4
UK Albums (Official Charts)	1
