= Back to Bedlam 20th Anniversary Tour =

2025 concert tour by James Blunt

- Tour by James Blunt
- Associated album: Back to Bedlam
- Start date: 11 February 2025
- End date: 30 October 2025
- Legs: 4
- No. of shows: 45

James Blunt concert chronology
- Who We Used to Be Tour (2024); Back to Bedlam 20th Anniversary Tour (2025); Airplane Mode Tour (2027)

The Back to Bedlam 20th Anniversary Tour was a concert tour by English musician James Blunt. It was part of a celebration for the 20th anniversary of the album with the same name, which was re-released as a special edition due to the event.

== Tour dates ==
List of 2025 concerts, showing date, city, country and venue
Date	City	Country	Venue
11 February 2025	Belfast	Northern Ireland	The SSE Arena
13 February 2025	Leeds	England	First Direct Arena
14 February 2025	Glasgow	Scotland	OVO Hydro
15 February 2025	Manchester	England	AO Arena
16 February 2025	London	England	The O2
18 February 2025	Brussels	Belgium	Forest National
20 February 2025	Paris	France	Adidas Arena
22 February 2025	Bologna	Italy	Unipol Arena
23 February 2025	Zürich	Switzerland	Hallenstadion
25 February 2025	Vienna	Austria	Wiener Stadthalle
27 February 2025	Berlin	Germany	Uber Arena
28 February 2025	Hamburg	Germany	Barclays Arena
1 March 2025	Oberhausen	Germany	Rudolf Weber-Arena
2 March 2025	Munich	Germany	Olympiahalle
4 March 2025	Amsterdam	Netherlands	Ziggo Dome
6 March 2025	Dublin	Ireland	3Arena
12 June 2025	Toronto	Canada	Massey Hall
13 June 2025	Laval	Canada	Place Bell
14 June 2025	Québec	Canada	Quebec City Old Port Agora
16 June 2025	Boston	United States	MGM Music Hall at Fenway
17 June 2025	New York City	United States	SummerStage in Central Park
18 June 2025	Vienna	United States	Filene Center at Wolf Trap
20 June 2025	Philadelphia	United States	The Met
21 June 2025	Ledyard	United States	Foxwoods Resort Casino
23 June 2025	Chicago	United States	The Salt Shed
26 June 2025	San Francisco	United States	Nob Hill Masonic
27 June 2025	Los Angeles	United States	The Greek Theatre
30 June 2025	Monterrey	Mexico	Ecenario GNP
1 July 2025	Mexico City	Mexico	Pepsi Center
3 July 2025	Guadalajara	Mexico	Auditorio Telemex
5 July 2025	Santiago	Chile	Movistar Arena
8 July 2025	São Paulo	Brazil	Terra SP
9 July 2025	Buenos Aires	Argentina	Teatro Gran Rivadavia
10 July 2025	Buenos Aires	Argentina	Teatro Gran Rivadavia
5 August 2025	Calella de Palafrugell	Spain	Cap Roig Festival
7 August 2025	Schwetzingen	Germany	Musik im Park
8 August 2025	Nidau	Switzerland	Lakelive Festival
10 August 2025	Zofingen	Switzerland	Heitere Open Air
21 October 2025	Auckland	New Zealand	Spark Arena
23 October 2025	Brisbane	Australia	Brisbane Entertainment Centre
25 October 2025	Sydney	Australia	Qudos Bank Arena
26 October 2025	Melbourne	Australia	Rod Laver Arena
28 October 2025	Adelaide	Australia	Adelaide Entertainment Centre
30 October 2025	Perth	Australia	RAC Arena
