= Me Before You (disambiguation) =

Me Before You is a 2016 romance drama film by Jojo Moyes.

Me Before You may refer to:

- Me Before You (novel), 2012 romantic novel by Jojo Moyes
- Me Before You (soundtrack), soundtrack album from the 2016 film
- "Me Before You", 2024 Bleachers song from Bleachers
- "Me Before You", 2024 Kygo and Plested song from Kygo
- "Me Before You", 2020 Mali-Koa Hood song from Hunger

== See also ==
- "You Before Me", 2012 song by Hoobastank from their album, Fight or Flight
- "You Before Me", 2019 TV episode of UK television show 24 Hours in A&E
