= Goodbye My Lover =

2005 single by James Blunt

Single by James Blunt

from the album Back to Bedlam
- Released: 12 December 2005
- Length: 4:18
- Label: Atlantic; Custard
- Songwriters: James Blunt; Sacha Skarbek
- Producer: Tom Rothrock

James Blunt singles chronology
"High" (2005)	"Goodbye My Lover" (2005)	"Wisemen" (re-release) (2006)

"Goodbye My Lover" is a song by English singer-songwriter James Blunt, written by Blunt and British songwriter Sacha Skarbek, for Blunt's debut album, Back to Bedlam (2004). The song was produced by Tom Rothrock and recorded in the bathroom of actress Carrie Fisher's home. The single received a positive reception from music critics.

"Goodbye My Lover" was released as the fourth single in December 2005 and reached number nine in the United Kingdom, where it became Blunt's second top-10 single. It also reached number one in Sweden and entered the top five in Australia, Belgium (Flanders and Wallonia), the Czech Republic, and the Netherlands. In the United States, "Goodbye My Lover" reached number 66 on the Billboard Hot 100 due to digital downloads.

== Recording ==
While in Los Angeles, Blunt lodged with Carrie Fisher, whom he had met through the family of a former girlfriend. Fisher was very supportive of Blunt's aspirations and provided the use of a bathroom in her home that featured a piano for him to record "Goodbye My Lover". Blunt later said, "Everyone sings in the shower and everyone in Los Angeles seems to have a piano in the bathroom."

== Release ==
The single was released on three physical formats. CD1 includes an exclusive non-album recording, "Close Your Eyes", which was first written during Blunt's army days. CD2 includes a further non-album recording, "Where Is My Mind" performed live in Manchester, plus the video for "Goodbye My Lover" and behind-the-scenes "Making-Of" footage. The 7-inch vinyl includes the live version of "Where Is My Mind".

== Chart performance ==
In December 2005, "Goodbye My Lover" was released in the United Kingdom. The song became Blunt's second top ten single when it peaked at number nine on the singles chart, and spent a total of 14 weeks in the top 75. Outside of the UK, the song was also successful. It reached number one in Sweden and became Blunt's second number one on the singles chart.

"Goodbye My Lover" was released in Australia in December 2005 and debuted at number eight before ascending the chart to number three, remaining inside the top ten for 16 weeks, a feat rarely reached in recent years.

Due to the favourable reception of Blunt's previous single "You're Beautiful", "Goodbye My Lover" debuted on the U.S. Billboard Hot 100 singles chart at number 100, even though it had not been released as a single in the U.S. The single appeared on the chart backed solely on the strength of digital sales after a re-run of an episode of Saturday Night Live that featured Blunt performing the song. It later re-entered the Billboard Hot 100, again due to digital downloads, as a result of Blunt's performance of the song on The Oprah Winfrey Show.

== Music video ==
"Goodbye My Lover" featured a music video that was directed by Sam Brown and was filmed on 28 October 2005 in Los Angeles. In the video Blunt is featured sitting in a darkened room by himself, reflecting on a past relationship. In what appears to be the same room, but in daylight, a young man and woman, the former lovers, share an intimate moment. The video was shot in the former home of Randolph Scott. The young woman in the video was played by Mischa Barton. The young man in the video was played by Matt Dallas.

== Track listings ==
CD1

1. "Goodbye My Lover" – 4:18
2. "Close Your Eyes" – 3:06

CD2

1. "Goodbye My Lover" – 4:18
2. "Where Is My Mind" (live in Manchester) – 4:55
3. "Goodbye My Lover" (the making of the video) – 3:00
4. "Goodbye My Lover" (video) – 4:19

7-inch vinyl

1. "Goodbye My Lover" – 4:18
2. "Where Is My Mind" (live in Manchester) – 4:55

== Charts ==
=== Weekly charts ===
Chart (2005–2007)	Peak position
Australia (ARIA)	3
Austria (Ö3 Austria Top 40)	36
Belgium (Ultratop 50 Flanders)	2
Belgium (Ultratop 50 Wallonia)	2
Canada AC (Billboard)	27
Canada Hot AC (Billboard)	41
Czech Republic Airplay (ČNS IFPI)	4
Denmark (Tracklisten)	9
Europe (Eurochart Hot 100)	8
France (SNEP)	6
Germany (GfK)	28
Greece (IFPI)	9
Ireland (IRMA)	13
Netherlands (Dutch Top 40)	4
Netherlands (Single Top 100)	4
New Zealand (Recorded Music NZ)	19
Norway (VG-lista)	6
Scottish Singles Sales (Official Charts)	11
Sweden (Sverigetopplistan)	1
Switzerland (Schweizer Hitparade)	19
UK Singles (Official Charts)	9
UK Airplay (Music Week)	14
US Billboard Hot 100	66
US Adult Pop Airplay (Billboard)	18
US Pop 100 (Billboard)	53

=== Year-end charts ===
Chart (2006)	Position
Australia (ARIA)	15
Belgium (Ultratop 50 Flanders)	24
Belgium (Ultratop 50 Wallonia)	26
Europe (Eurochart Hot 100)	29
France (SNEP)	40
Netherlands (Dutch Top 40)	43
Netherlands (Single Top 100)	74
Sweden (Sverigetopplistan)	47
Switzerland (Schweizer Hitparade)	80
UK Singles (OCC)	94

== Certifications ==
Region	Certification	Certified units/sales
Australia (ARIA)	Platinum	70,000^{^}
Belgium (BRMA)	Gold	25,000^{*}
Denmark (IFPI Danmark)	Platinum	8,000^{^}
Germany (BVMI)	Gold	300,000^{‡}
Italy (FIMI) sales since 2009	Platinum	100,000^{‡}
New Zealand (RMNZ)	Platinum	30,000^{‡}
Spain (Promusicae)	Gold	30,000^{‡}
Sweden (GLF)	Gold	10,000^{^}
Switzerland (IFPI Switzerland)	Gold	20,000^{^}
United Kingdom (BPI)	Platinum	600,000^{‡}
United States (RIAA)	Gold	500,000^{^}
^{*} Sales figures based on certification alone.^{^} Shipments figures based on certification alone.^{‡} Sales+streaming figures based on certification alone.

== Release history ==
Region	Date	Format(s)	Label(s)	Ref.
Australia	12 December 2005	CD	Atlantic; Custard	
United Kingdom	19 December 2005	7-inch vinyl; CD	Atlantic; Custard	
United States	21 August 2006	Hot adult contemporary radio	Atlantic; Custard	
United States	20 November 2006	Contemporary hit radio	Atlantic; Custard	
