= Airplane Mode Tour =

Upcoming concert tour by James Blunt

Back to Bedlam 20th Anniversary Tour
- Tour by James Blunt
- Associated album: Airplane Mode
- Start date: 17 February 2027
- End date: 8 April 2027
- No. of shows: 37

James Blunt concert chronology
- Back to Bedlam 20th Anniversary Tour (2025); Airplane Mode Tour (2027)

The Airplane Mode Tour is an upcoming concert tour by English singer-songwriter James Blunt. The tour is organized in support of his new studio album, Airplane Mode, released on 6 November 2026 via Atlantic Records.

== Background ==
In early September 2026, James Blunt announced the release of his new studio album, Airplane Mode, alongside the reveal of a headline tour, set to take place across the European continent, spanning from February through April 2027. The tour kicks off in February 2027 across mainland Europe. Throughout February and March 2027, Blunt visits multiple countries across Central, Southern, and Northern Europe, including an extensive run of performances throughout Germany and Austria. In late March and April 2027, the second major leg of the tour focuses on dates across the United Kingdom.

== Tour dates ==
List of 2027 concerts
Date	City	Country	Venue	Attendance	Revenue
17 February	Esch-sur-Alzette	Luxembourg	Rockhal	—	—
19 February	Brussels	Belgium	Forest National	—	—
20 February	Amsterdam	Netherlands	Ziggo Dome	—	—
21 February	Paris	France	Adidas Arena	—	—
23 February	Nuremberg	Germany	PSD Bank Arena	—	—
24 February	Hanover	Germany	ZAG Arena	—	—
26 February	Munich	Germany	Olympiahalle	—	—
27 February	Milan	Italy	Unipol Forum	—	—
28 February	Florence	Italy	Mandela Forum	—	—
2 March	Geneva	Switzerland	Arena Gnéve	—	—
3 March	Zürich	Switzerland	Hallenstadion	—	—
5 March	Prague	Czech Republic	O2 Universum	—	—
6 March	Innsbruck	Austria	Olympiahalle	—	—
7 March	Vienna	Austria	Wiener Stadthalle	—	—
9 March	Budapest	Hungary	MVM Dome	—	—
10 March	Wrocław	Poland	Hala Stulecia	—	—
12 March	Leipzig	Germany	QUARTERBACK Immobilien Arena	—	—
13 March	Düsseldorf	Germany	PSD Bank Dome	—	—
14 March	Hamburg	Germany	Barclays Arena	—	—
16 March	Oslo	Norway	Oslo Spektrum	—	—
17 March	Göteborg	Sweden	Scandinavium	—	—
19 March	Copenhagen	Denmark	Royal Arena	—	—
20 March	Berlin	Germany	Uber Arena	—	—
21 March	Stuttgart	Germany	Hans-Martin-Schleyer-Halle	—	—
23 March	Freiburg	Germany	SICK-Arena	—	—
24 March	Mannheim	Germany	SAP Arena	—	—
26 March	Leeds	England	First Direct Bank Arena	—	—
27 March	Birmingham	England	bp pulse LIVE	—	—
28 March	Newcastle	England	Utilita Arena	—	—
30 March	Dublin	Ireland	3Arena	—	—
31 March	Belfast	Northern Ireland	The O2 Belfast	—	—
2 April	Glasgow	Scotland	OVO Hydro	—	—
3 April	Manchester	England	Co-op Live	—	—
4 April	London	England	The O2 Arena	—	—
6 April	Cardiff	Wales	Utilita Arena Cardiff	—	—
7 April	Bournemouth	England	Bournemouth International Centre	—	—
8 April	Brighton	England	Brighton Centre	—	—
