= High (James Blunt song) =

2004 single by James Blunt

Single by James Blunt

from the album Back to Bedlam
- Released: 18 October 2004
- Length: 4:03
- Label: Atlantic; Custard
- Songwriters: James Blunt; Ricky Ross
- Producer: Tom Rothrock

James Blunt singles chronology
"High" (2004)	"Wisemen" (2005)

Alternative cover
- Re-release single cover

Music video
- "High (Official Original Video)" on YouTube^{[a]}

"High" is the debut single of British singer James Blunt and Ricky Ross for Blunt's debut album, Back to Bedlam. The song was produced by Tom Rothrock. It was released in October 2004 and failed to make an impact on the UK Singles Chart, peaking outside the top 75. Following the success of Blunt's second single, "You're Beautiful", "High" was re-released in late 2005 and became a top-20 hit worldwide, charting at number three in Italy and at number 16 in the UK.

== Release ==
The single was released initially on two physical formats. CD1 includes an exclusive non-album recording titled "Sugar Coated", which was written by Blunt and Sacha Skarbek. CD2 also includes two exclusive non-album recordings, entitled "This Twilight Garden" and "Play", as well as two remixes of "High". The re-issue of the single was released on three physical formats. CD1 includes a live recording of "In a Little While", a popular song by U2. The recording was made on 5 August 2005 at the BBC Radio 1 Unleashed Music Festival in Cornwall. CD2 includes an exclusive US radio session of "You're Beautiful", plus the video and making-of footage for "High". The 7" Vinyl includes an exclusive track entitled "Butterfly".

== Chart performance ==
On 18 October 2004, "High" was released in the United Kingdom. The song failed to make an impact on the singles chart, peaking at a low 148. It was re-released in the UK on 3 October 2005. The song became Blunt's third top-20 single when it peaked at number 16 on the singles chart, and spent a total of 12 weeks in the top 75. The re-release appeared on the singles chart a week before the physical release was released, backed by the strength of its digital download sales, charting at number 74. The following week it climbed 58 places on the chart, rising to number 16. Outside of the UK, the song was also successful. It reached number three in Italy and became Blunt's first top ten single. "High" also went top ten 20 in Austria, Ireland and Switzerland. In the United States, the song debuted at number 100 on the Billboard Hot 100 and became Blunt's third single to chart within the top 100. In Canada, "High" reached number 66 on the BDS Airplay chart.

== Music videos ==
Blunt has made two music videos for "High". The first video, which is associated with the first release as a single, was filmed in the Canary Islands, and shows him buried in a desert and then chasing an illusional girl while drunk^{^[a]}. In the video for the re-release of "High", Blunt is sitting on a plastic chair in a warehouse-like room, playing the guitar and singing the song; these scenes are intercut with scenes where Blunt is running in a forest.

== Track listings ==
=== 2004 release ===
1. "High" – 4:03
2. "Sugar Coated" – 3:56

=== 2005–2006 release ===
CD1

1. "High" – 4:03
2. "In a Little While" (Radio 1 Jo Whiley Session) – 3:46

CD2

1. "High" – 4:03
2. "You're Beautiful" (U.S. radio session) – 3:18
3. "High" (The Making of the Video) – 3:00
4. "High" (video) – 4:02

7-inch single

1. "High" (album version) – 4:03
2. "Butterfly" – 4:44

German CD1

1. "High" (album version) – 4:03
2. "High" (acoustic) – 4:15

German CD2

1. "High" (album version) – 4:03
2. "High" (acoustic) – 4:15
3. "Where Is My Mind?" – 4:43
4. "High" (video) – 4:02

== Personnel ==
- James Blunt – vocals, acoustic and electric rhythm guitars, piano, keyboards, marimba
- Sasha Krivtsov – bass guitar
- Charlie Paxson – drums
- John Nau – Wurlitzer electric piano
- Mike Tarantino – electric lead guitar

== Charts ==
=== Weekly charts ===
Chart (2005–2006)	Peak position
Australia (ARIA)	42
Austria (Ö3 Austria Top 40)	13
Canada AC (Billboard)	44
Canada Hot AC (Billboard)	23
Czech Republic Airplay (ČNS IFPI)	48
Germany (GfK)	22
Germany Airplay (BVMI)	1
Ireland (IRMA)	18
Italy (FIMI)	3
Scotland Singles (OCC)	13
Switzerland (Schweizer Hitparade)	15
UK Singles (OCC)	16
US Billboard Hot 100	100
US Adult Alternative Airplay (Billboard)	9
US Adult Contemporary (Billboard)	37
US Adult Pop Airplay (Billboard)	12
US Pop 100 (Billboard)	92

=== Year-end charts ===
Chart (2005)	Position
Italy (FIMI)	23

Chart (2006)	Position
Brazil (Crowley)	71
US Adult Top 40 (Billboard)	38

== Certifications and sales ==
Region	Certification	Certified units/sales
Italy	—	30,000
United Kingdom (BPI)	Silver	200,000^{‡}
^{‡} Sales+streaming figures based on certification alone.

== Release history ==
Release dates and formats for "High"
Region	Date	Format	Label(s)	Ref.
United States	May 15, 2006	Mainstream airplay	Atlantic	
