= Wisemen =

2005 single by James Blunt

Single by James Blunt

from the album Back to Bedlam
- Released: 7 March 2005
- Recorded: 2003
- Length: 3:42 (album version); 3:17 (radio edit)
- Label: Atlantic; Custard
- Songwriters: James Blunt; Jimmy Hogarth; Sacha Skarbek
- Producers: Tom Rothrock; Jimmy Hogarth

James Blunt singles chronology
"High" (2004)	"Wisemen" (2005)	"You're Beautiful" (2005)

James Blunt singles chronology
"Goodbye My Lover" (2005)	"Wisemen" (re-release) (2006)	"No Bravery" (2006)

Music video
- "Wisemen" on YouTube

"Wisemen" is a song written by British singer James Blunt, Jimmy Hogarth and Sacha Skarbek for Blunt's debut album, Back to Bedlam. The song was produced by Tom Rothrock and Jimmy Hogarth and was released in March 2005 as the second single from the album. It reached the top 50 in the United Kingdom, peaking at number 44. Following the success of "You're Beautiful" and "Goodbye My Lover", "Wisemen" was re-released in March 2006, reaching number 21 in New Zealand and number 23 in the UK. The song was met with positive reviews.

== Release ==
"Wisemen" was first released on 7 March 2005 on three physical formats. The CD single includes an exclusive live performance of "No Bravery". The DVD includes the original video for "Wisemen", exclusive "Making Of" footage and a live audio recording of "Out of My Mind". The 7-inch vinyl includes a live performance of "Billy". The re-release, issued on 13 March 2006, was also available on three physical formats, containing a similar track listing. CD1 includes a live performance of "Out of My Mind", taken from the initial DVD single; CD2 includes the live performances of "No Bravery" and "Out of My Mind", plus the video for "Wisemen"; and the limited edition one-sided 7-inch vinyl features "Wisemen" only. In Australia, the single was released on 17 April 2006.

== Chart performance ==
During its original release, "Wisemen" became Blunt's first single to chart within the top 100 on the UK Singles Chart, peaking at number 44. Following its UK re-release, the song became his fourth top-40 single when it peaked at number 23 on the same chart, spending a total of six weeks in the top 75. It reached number 11 in Australia and became his third single to reach the top 20. In Canada, the song became an airplay hit, reaching number three on the BDS Airplay chart.

== Music videos ==
The music video was filmed on 3 December 2004, and released in tandem with the first UK release of the single, has Blunt and his band performing in the Café de Paris. The only occupants of the café are three middle-aged men, supposedly businessmen, who are accompanied by a young woman. The woman stands and begins to dance in the middle of the room but is ignored by the men. Three masked men, supposedly the wisemen, then enter and kidnap Blunt, putting him into a car and driving to the shore where he is imprisoned in a hastily constructed shack by the seaside, in reference to the lyric, "Those three wisemen, they've got a semi by the sea." The masks were constructed from moulds cast from Blunt's own face.

The second version, which was released in tandem with the UK re-release of the single, has Blunt burning his personal papers and passport in a forest before slowly internally combusting. The video was filmed on 13 February 2006, and released for the U.S. market. During a guest-hosting slot on the BBC2 programme Never Mind the Buzzcocks, Blunt was asked what the line meant and said that "Semi" referred to a "semi-automatic rifle".

== Track listings ==
=== 2005 ===
CD

1. "Wisemen" - 3:45
2. "No Bravery" (Live) - 3:24

DVD

1. "Wisemen" (Audio) - 3:45
2. "Wisemen" (Video) - 3:50
3. "High" (Video) - 3:45
4. "Wisemen" (The Making of the Video) - 3:00

7-inch vinyl

1. "Wisemen" - 3:45
2. "Billy" (Live) - 4:12

=== 2006 ===
CD1

1. "Wisemen" - 3:45
2. "Out of My Mind" (Live at the Bowery Ballroom, NYC) - 3:22

CD2

1. "Wisemen" - 3:45
2. "No Bravery" (Live) - 3:16
3. "Out of My Mind" (Live at the Bowery Ballroom, NYC) - 3:00

7-inch vinyl

1. "Wisemen" - 3:45

== Personnel ==
- James Blunt – lead vocals, classical guitar, organ, Rhodes piano
- Jimmy Hogarth – acoustic guitar, keyboards
- John Nau – Hammond organ, Wurlitzer electric piano
- Sacha Skarbek – Rhodes piano
- John Goodwin – electric guitar
- Amanda Ghost – backing vocals
- Sasha Krivtsov – bass guitar
- Charlie Paxton – drums

== Charts ==
=== Weekly charts ===
Chart (2005)	Peak position
Scottish Singles Sales (Official Charts)	28
UK Singles (Official Charts)	44

Chart (2006)	Peak position
Australia (ARIA)	11
Austria (Ö3 Austria Top 40)	15
Belgium (Ultratip Bubbling Under Flanders)	2
Belgium (Ultratip Bubbling Under Wallonia)	1
Canada Digital Song Sales (Billboard)	10
Canada AC Top 30 (Radio & Records)	27
Canada AC (Billboard)	35
Canada CHR/Pop Top 30 (Radio & Records)	24
Canada Hot AC Top 40 (Radio & Records)	2
Canada Hot AC (Billboard)	21
Czech Republic Airplay (ČNS IFPI)	1
Germany (GfK)	40
Ireland (IRMA)	36
Italy (FIMI)	12
Netherlands (Dutch Top 40)	9
Netherlands (Single Top 100)	17
New Zealand (Recorded Music NZ)	21
Scottish Singles Sales (Official Charts)	23
Slovakia Airplay (ČNS IFPI)	18
Sweden (Sverigetopplistan)	38
Switzerland (Schweizer Hitparade)	23
UK Singles (OCC)	23

=== Year-end charts ===
Chart (2006)	Position
Australia (ARIA)	75
Italy (FIMI)	44
Netherlands (Dutch Top 40)	28
Netherlands (Single Top 100)	61
UK Singles (OCC)	184

== Certifications ==
Region	Certification	Certified units/sales
Denmark (IFPI Danmark)	Gold	4,000^{^}
New Zealand (RMNZ)	Gold	15,000^{‡}
United Kingdom (BPI)	Gold	400,000^{‡}
^{^} Shipments figures based on certification alone.^{‡} Sales+streaming figures based on certification alone.
