= Me Before You (soundtrack) =

2016 album by various artists

Me Before You (Original Motion Picture Soundtrack)

Soundtrack album by Various artists
- Released: June 1, 2016
- Recorded: 2015–2016
- Length: 34:55
- Label: Interscope
- Producer: Various: Inflo; Louis Charles Diller; Alex da Kid; Jamie Scott; Mike Crossey; George Daniel; Matthew Healy; Jack Garratt; Ian Barter; Jeff Bhasker; Imagine Dragons

Singles from Me Before You (Original Motion Picture Soundtrack)
- 1. "Unsteady (Erich Lee Gravity Remix)" Released: April 23, 2016; 2. "Not Today" Released: April 29, 2016; 3. "Till The End" Released: May 26, 2016

Me Before You (Original Motion Picture Score)

Film score by Craig Armstrong
- Released: June 3, 2016
- Recorded: 2015–2016
- Length: 49:38
- Label: WaterTower Music
- Producer: Craig Armstrong

Craig Armstrong chronology
Victor Frankenstein (2015)	Me Before You (2016)	Snowden (2016)

Me Before You (Original Motion Picture Soundtrack) is the soundtrack album to the 2016 film Me Before You, based on the 2012 novel of the same name. The album, released on June 1, 2016, by Interscope Records, featured a compilation of songs from various artists including Ed Sheeran, Imagine Dragons, Holychild, Max Jury, Jack Garratt, The 1975, X Ambassadors among others. Me Before You (Original Motion Picture Score), another album featuring instrumentals from the film's original score composed by Craig Armstrong was released on June 3, 2016, by WaterTower Music. Both were released to tie in with the film's theatrical opening.

== Release ==
Interscope Records announced the soundtrack on 22nd April 2016. Erich Lee's remix of X Ambassadors' track "Unsteady" was released the following day, on April 23, followed by the release of Imagine Dragons' "Not Today" on April 29. The original song for the film, "Till The End" performed by Jessie Ware was released as a promotional single on May 26, 2016, accompanied by a music video featuring Ware with stills from the film in the background. Ken Hamm of Soulbounce magazine, described the track as an "easy listening ballad about that special someone in her life. The lush sound bed is composed of subdued guitar strings, drums, finger snaps and whispery harmonies that compliment [sic] Jessie's silken voice. While the lyrics aren't anything we haven't heard before, the composition and arrangement of the song, not to mention Ware's vocals, give the track the necessary oomph for consideration on your baelist." The album was released on June 1, while the score composed by Craig Armstrong was released by WaterTower Music on June 3.

== Reception ==
Olivia Truffaut-Wong of Bustle said "the soundtrack may be short, but it is effective in evoking the emotions of the film". Susan Wloszczyna of RogerEbert.com praised the director Thea Sharrock for the selection of Ed Sheeran and Imagine Dragons in the film's soundtrack. PopSugar wrote "The Me Before You Soundtrack Is Your New Favorite Playlist" In a mixed critical review for The Seattle Times, Kate Clark wrote "the film is sweet but often loses impact in its most serious moments by blasting a happy pop soundtrack". Jonathan Broxton wrote "Me Before You is a very typical romantic drama score, and as such is highly unlikely to set the film music world alight, especially for those film music fans who need a little more orchestral bombast in their scores. However, for fans of Craig Armstrong's serious, strong, earnestly sincere dramatic and romantic writing, it's a top notch release."

== Track listing ==
Me Before You (Original Motion Picture Soundtrack)
No.	Title	Writer(s)	Artist(s)	Length
1.	"Numb"	Dean Josiah; Max Jury	Jury	4:05
2.	"Happy With Me"	Elizabeth Lynn Nistico; Louis Charles Diller	Holychild	2:48
3.	"Unsteady" (Erich Lee Gravity Remix)	Alexander Grant; Adam Levin; Casey Harris; Noah Feldshuh; Sam Harris	Erich Lee; X Ambassadors	3:24
4.	"Till The End"	Jamie Scott; Dave Okumu; Jessie Ware; Sacha Skarbek	Ware	3:00
5.	"The Sound"	Adam Hann; George Daniel; Matthew Healy; Ross MacDonald	The 1975	4:08
6.	"Surprise Yourself"	Jack Garratt	Garratt	4:20
7.	"Don't Forget About Me"	Ian Barter; Kaity Dunstan	Cloves	4:28
8.	"Photograph"	Johnny McDaid; Ed Sheeran; Martin Harrington; Thomas Leonard	Sheeran	4:16
9.	"Not Today"	Dan Reynolds; Wayne Sermon; Ben McKee; Daniel Platzman; Mike Daly	Imagine Dragons	4:21
Total length:				34:55

Me Before You (Original Motion Picture Score)
No.	Title	Length
1.	"Me Before You Orchestral"	7:13
2.	"Will Goes To Work"	0:55
3.	"The Castle"	1:33
4.	"Walk Home"	0:57
5.	"Lou's Interview"	1:20
6.	"Meet Will"	0:52
7.	"Lunch Hour"	1:08
8.	"Alicia & Rupert"	1:15
9.	"Lou Phones for Help"	1:52
10.	"Will's Pain"	1:12
11.	"Didn't You Love Anything"	1:44
12.	"Lou Shaves Will"	1:47
13.	"Will's Wish"	1:57
14.	"The Red Dress"	0:25
15.	"Ramparts"	2:45
16.	"A Lawyer Calls"	1:09
17.	"Rush to Hospital"	1:09
18.	"Nathan Agrees"	0:34
19.	"The Beach"	2:59
20.	"Talk With Dad"	1:14
21.	"Journey to Dignitas"	1:40
22.	"Paris"	3:26
23.	"Within A Day"	4:04
Total length:		43:20

== Chart performance ==
=== Weekly charts ===
Chart (2016)	Position
Australian Albums (ARIA)	30
Austrian Albums (Ö3 Austria)	66
Belgian Albums (Ultratop Flanders)	150
Belgian Albums (Ultratop Wallonia)	119
Canadian Albums (Billboard)	13
German Albums (Offizielle Top 100)	65
Swiss Albums (Schweizer Hitparade)	68
UK Compilation Albums (OCC)	61
UK Soundtrack Albums (OCC)	5
US Billboard 200	13
US Soundtrack Albums (Billboard)	2

=== Year-end charts ===
Chart (2016)	Position
US Soundtrack Albums (Billboard)	23
