= Wicked Ways =

Wicked Ways may refer to:

- "Wicked Ways", a 1986 single and song from the Blow Monkeys' album Animal Magic
- "Wicked Ways", a 1986 song from Patty Loveless' album Patty Loveless
- "Wicked Ways", a 1990 song from Deep Purple's album Slaves and Masters
- "Wicked Ways", a 1998 song from Garbage's album Version 2.0
- "Wicked Ways", a 2011 song from Five Finger Death Punch's album American Capitalist
- "Wicked Ways", a 2013 song from Eminem's album The Marshall Mathers LP 2
- "Wicked Ways", a 2022 song from Halestorm's album Back from the Dead
- "Wicked Ways", a 2023 song from Ren's album Sick Boi
- Wicked Ways, the 2009 debut album of Dutch singer Waylon

== See also ==
- Wicked Wayz, a 1996 album by Mr. Mike
