= Tastes Like Summer =

2026 single by James Blunt

Single by James Blunt
- Released: 14 August 2026
- Studio: Pig Music (Banbury)
- Genre: Pop rock
- Length: 3:39
- Label: Atlantic
- Songwriters: James Blunt; George Tizzard; Rick Parkhouse

James Blunt singles chronology
"Tears Dry Tonight" (2025)	"Tastes Like Summer" (2026)	"Weight of it All" (2026)

Music video
- "Tastes Like Summer" on YouTube

"Tastes Like Summer" is a song by English singer-songwriter James Blunt, produced by Red Triangle. It was released by Atlantic Records UK on 14 August 2026.

== Music video ==
The official music video was released on 14 August 2026. The video was filmed in Ibiza and directed by Jack Howard, inspired by A24 horror films and depicts Blunt in a horror-themed scenario involving a meal.

=== Reception ===
The storyline was described by some media outlets as disturbing, while other coverage characterized it as an intentionally macabre or darkly comic interpretation of the song's lyric "your skin tastes like summer".

Following the death of actress Hayden Panettiere on 16 August 2026, two days after the video's release, the video's imagery became the subject of renewed online speculation concerning Blunt. The speculation was connected to an account in Panettiere's memoir This Is Me: A Reckoning, released earlier in the year, in which she described an encounter at age 18 with an unnamed "British singer-songwriter in his thirties". Panettiere did not identify the man, and no reliable evidence has established that Blunt was the person she described.

The video's use of macabre imagery was consistent with elements of Blunt's previous music videos, which have also incorporated dark themes.

== Charts ==
=== Weekly charts ===
Weekly chart performance
Chart (2026)	Peak position
Argentina Anglo Airplay (Monitor Latino)	15
Belgium (Ultratop 50 Wallonia)	29
Croatia International Airplay (Top lista)	41
Germany Airplay (MusicTrace)	49
Kazakhstan Airplay (TopHit)	81
Lithuania Airplay (TopHit)	53
Romania Airplay (Media Forest)	18
Slovakia Airplay (ČNS IFPI)	22
UK Singles Sales (Official Charts)	11

=== Monthly charts ===
Monthly chart performance
Chart (2026)	Peak position
Lithuania Airplay (TopHit)	76
Romania Airplay (TopHit)	40
