= James Blunt =

English musician (born 1974)

- Blunt in 2021
- Born: James Hillier Blount; 22 February 1974 (age 52); Tidworth, Hampshire, England
- Other names: Blunty McBluntface; Ryan Bel Air
- Education: University of Bristol (BSc)
- Occupations: Singer; songwriter; musician
- Years active: 2003–present
- Spouse: Sofia Wellesley (m. 2014)
- Children: 2
- Relatives: Valerian Wellesley, 8th Duke of Wellington (grandfather-in-law)
- Musical career
- Genres: Pop rock; folk rock; folk pop; soft rock
- Instruments: Vocals; guitar; keyboards; piano; organ; ukulele; marimba
- Labels: Custard; Atlantic; Warner
- Website: www.jamesblunt.com
- Military career
- Allegiance: United Kingdom
- Branch: British Army
- Service years: 1996–2002
- Rank: Captain
- Service number: 547098
- Unit: Life Guards
- Conflicts: Kosovo War

James Hillier Blount (born 22 February 1974), better known by his stage name James Blunt, is an English singer, songwriter and musician.

As a British Army captain in the aftermath of the Kosovo War, Blunt was involved in the British refusal to engage Russian troops at Pristina Airport. After leaving the army, he rose to fame in 2004 with the release of his debut album, Back to Bedlam, achieving worldwide fame with the singles "You're Beautiful" and "Goodbye My Lover". The album had sold over 12 million copies worldwide by December 2009, topping the UK Albums Chart and peaking at number two in the US. "You're Beautiful" reached number one in thirteen countries, including the UK and the US. Back to Bedlam was the best-selling album of the 2000s in the UK and is, as of 2018, one of the best-selling albums in UK chart history.

Blunt's second album, All the Lost Souls, released in 2007, reached number one in twelve countries. He went on to release a further five albums: Some Kind of Trouble (2010), Moon Landing (2013), The Afterlove (2017), Once Upon a Mind (2019) and Who We Used to Be (2023). In October 2026, he starred in season two of the reality television series The Celebrity Traitors. His eighth album, Airplane Mode, was released on 6 November and entered the official UK album chart at number one on 13 November 2026.

Blunt had sold over 23 million albums worldwide as of 2021. He has received several awards, including two Brit Awards—winning Best British Male in 2006—two MTV Video Music Awards and two Ivor Novello Awards, as well as receiving five Grammy Award nominations and an Honorary Doctorate of Music in 2016 from the University of Bristol.

== Early life and education ==
James Hillier Blount was born on 22 February 1974 at Tidworth Camp military hospital in Hampshire. His mother, Jane Ann Farran (née Amos), owned a ski chalet company in the French Alpine resort of Méribel. His father, Charles Blount, was a cavalry officer in the 13th/18th Royal Hussars and helicopter pilot who eventually became a colonel in the Army Air Corps. The first of three children, Blunt has two sisters. The family has a long history of military service that dates back to the arrival of their Danish ancestors in England during the 10th century.

Blunt grew up primarily in St Mary Bourne, Hampshire, but regularly moved in accordance with his father's military postings. He moved between England (Middle Wallop, Netheravon, York), Cyprus (Nicosia) and Germany (Soest). He also spent time in Cley-next-the-Sea, where his father owned the Cley Windmill. Blunt was educated at Elstree School, Harrow School—where he attained A-levels in physics, chemistry and economics—and the University of Bristol, where he graduated with a BSc (Hons) in sociology in 1996 after initially studying civil engineering.

Like his father, Blunt was a pilot. He gained his fixed-winged private pilot licence at the age of 16. He also developed a keen interest in motorbikes during his teenage years.

== Military service ==
Blunt was sponsored through university by a British Army bursary, and was required to serve a minimum of four years in the army. He trained at the Royal Military Academy, Sandhurst in intake 963 and was commissioned into the Life Guards. He rose to the rank of captain. The Life Guards, part of the Household Cavalry Regiment, were primarily based in Combermere Barracks. Blunt trained in British Army Training Unit Suffield in Alberta, Canada, where his regiment was posted for six months in 1998 to act as the opposing army in combat training exercises.

In 1999, Blunt volunteered to join a squadron of the Blues and Royals who deployed with NATO to Kosovo. Initially assigned to carry out reconnaissance of the Macedonia–FR Yugoslavia border, Blunt's troop worked ahead of the front lines, locating and targeting Serbian forces for the NATO bombing campaign. On 12 June 1999, the troop led the 30,000-strong NATO peacekeeping force from the Macedonia border towards Pristina International Airport. However, a Russian military contingent had moved in and taken control of the airport before his unit's arrival. American NATO commander Wesley Clark ordered that the unit forcibly take the airport from the Russians. Blunt allegedly questioned the order and General Mike Jackson, the British commander, refused the order, telling Clark that they were "not going to start World War Three for you". Blunt has said that he would have refused to obey such an order if Jackson had not blocked it.

During Blunt's Kosovo assignment, he had taken along his guitar strapped to the outside of his tank and sometimes performed for locals and troops. While there he wrote the song "No Bravery". Blunt extended his military service in November 2000 and was posted to the Household Cavalry Mounted Regiment in London, as a member of the Queen's Guard. He stood guard at the coffin of Queen Elizabeth the Queen Mother during her lying in state and was part of the funeral procession on 9 April 2002.

A keen skier, Blunt captained the Household Cavalry alpine ski team in Verbier, Switzerland, becoming the Royal Armoured Corps giant slalom champion in 2000. He left the army on 1 October 2002, having served six years.

== Music career ==
=== Early career ===
Blunt had piano and violin lessons as a child and was introduced to the electric guitar aged 14 at Harrow by a fellow student. His dissertation at the University of Bristol was entitled The Commodification of Image – Production of a Pop Idol. One of his sources was Simon Frith, a sociologist and rock critic, and chair of the Mercury Music Prize panel of judges since 1992, who later undertook a lecture tour entitled "The unpopular and unpleasant thoughts inspired by the work of James Blunt".

While in the army, Blunt wrote songs during his free time. A backing vocalist and songwriting collaborator suggested that he contact Elton John's manager, Todd Interland, with whom she used to share a house. Interland told HitQuarters that he listened to Blunt's demo while driving home and, after hearing the track "Goodbye My Lover", pulled over and called the mobile number written on the CD to set up a meeting.

Blunt left the army in 2002 so that he could pursue his music career. He started using the stage name "James Blunt", in part to make his last name easier for others to spell; "Blount" is pronounced the same way, and remains his legal last name. Shortly after leaving the army he was signed to EMI music publishers and to Twenty-First Artists management. A record contract remained elusive, with label executives pointing to his posh speaking voice as a barrier in class-divided Britain. In early 2003 Linda Perry, who was launching her label Custard Records, heard Blunt's promotional tape when visiting London, and soon after heard him perform live at the South by Southwest Music Festival. She made an offer to him the same night, and within a few days he signed a recording contract with her. A month later, he travelled to Los Angeles to meet producer Tom Rothrock.

=== 2003–2006: Back to Bedlam ===
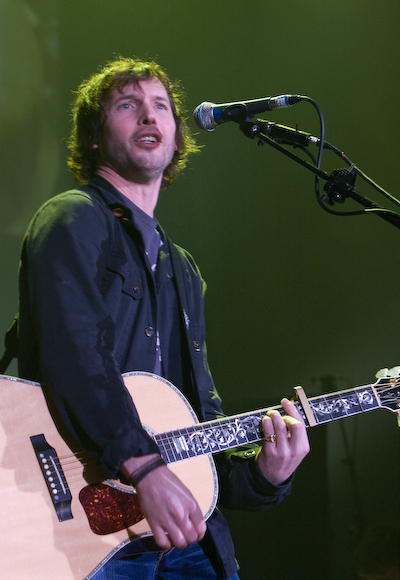
Blunt performing in the United States, 2008

Blunt recorded Back to Bedlam in 2003 with Rothrock as producer in Conway Recording Studios at Rothrock's home studio in Los Angeles, playing many instruments himself. During recording, he lodged with actress Carrie Fisher. Fisher contributed in naming the album, and he recorded the song "Goodbye My Lover" in her bathroom. Back to Bedlam was released in the UK in October 2004.

Blunt's debut single in the UK was "High" (co-written with Ricky Ross of Deacon Blue). This song initially peaked below the Top 100 of the UK Singles Chart; after the subsequent success of "You're Beautiful" it made the Top 75 before being re-released. The song was chosen to appear in a Vodafone commercial in Italy, and was a Top 10 hit in that country.

The debut album from the unknown Blunt initially attracted little critical attention; there were no published reviews from major UK music journals. His live performances, mainly in support of better-known musicians, received generally favourable reviews. His lack of performing experience and inconsistent approach with audiences was commented upon, while his music was likened to that of Damien Rice and David Gray.

In March 2004, with Blunt performing in the support role for Katie Melua in Manchester, Alex McCann from Designer Magazine wrote, "Blunt's ascendance is a dead cert and this time next year it isn't that far removed from reality to suggest that a number one album, Brit Award and countless accolade's [sic] will be his for the taking." After the release of the album, concert support slots for Elton John and Lloyd Cole and the Commotions in late 2004 and early 2005 followed, as did a band residency at London club 93 Feet East. In March 2005, his second single, "Wisemen", was released.

Blunt's third single, "You're Beautiful", was his break-out hit. The song debuted at number 12 in the UK, and reached number one six weeks later. The song received huge airplay in the UK, propelling Back to Bedlam to number one on the UK Albums Chart. The extensive airplay ultimately led to Blunt and his co-writers being awarded the Ivor Novello Award for Most Performed Work. After the success of "You're Beautiful" in the UK, the song crossed over to mainland Europe, becoming one of the biggest hits of summer 2005 across the continent. In the US, "You're Beautiful" made its debut in the summer of 2005 on WPLJ, a prominent radio station in New York City, despite not having been released to radio. The song was released to radio stations in the autumn of 2005 and climbed into the Top 10 in three radio formats: Adult Contemporary Music, Hot Adult Top 40 Tracks, and Adult album alternative.

Blunt became the first British artist to top the American singles chart in nearly a decade when "You're Beautiful" reached number one on the Billboard Hot 100 in 2006; the last British artist to do so had been Elton John in 1997 with the song "Candle in the Wind 1997". "Goodbye My Lover" was released as the fourth UK single from the album in December 2005, and the second US single. The songs "High" and "Wisemen" were subsequently re-released in 2006. Blunt began 2006 celebrating five Brit Award nominations, and went on to win Best British male solo artist and Best pop act categories, having already started an 11-month world tour. On 31 August 2006, he won two awards at the 2006 MTV Video Music Awards, with "You're Beautiful" winning the award for Best Male Video.

The album sold 11.2 million copies and topped the album charts in 16 territories worldwide. It sold 2.6 million in the US and was certified 2× platinum. In Britain the album sold over three million copies, was certified 10× platinum, and entered the Guinness Book of World Records for the fastest selling album in one year. In 2009, BBC Radio 1 announced that Back to Bedlam was the biggest-selling album of the 2000s decade in the United Kingdom.

=== 2007–2008: All the Lost Souls ===
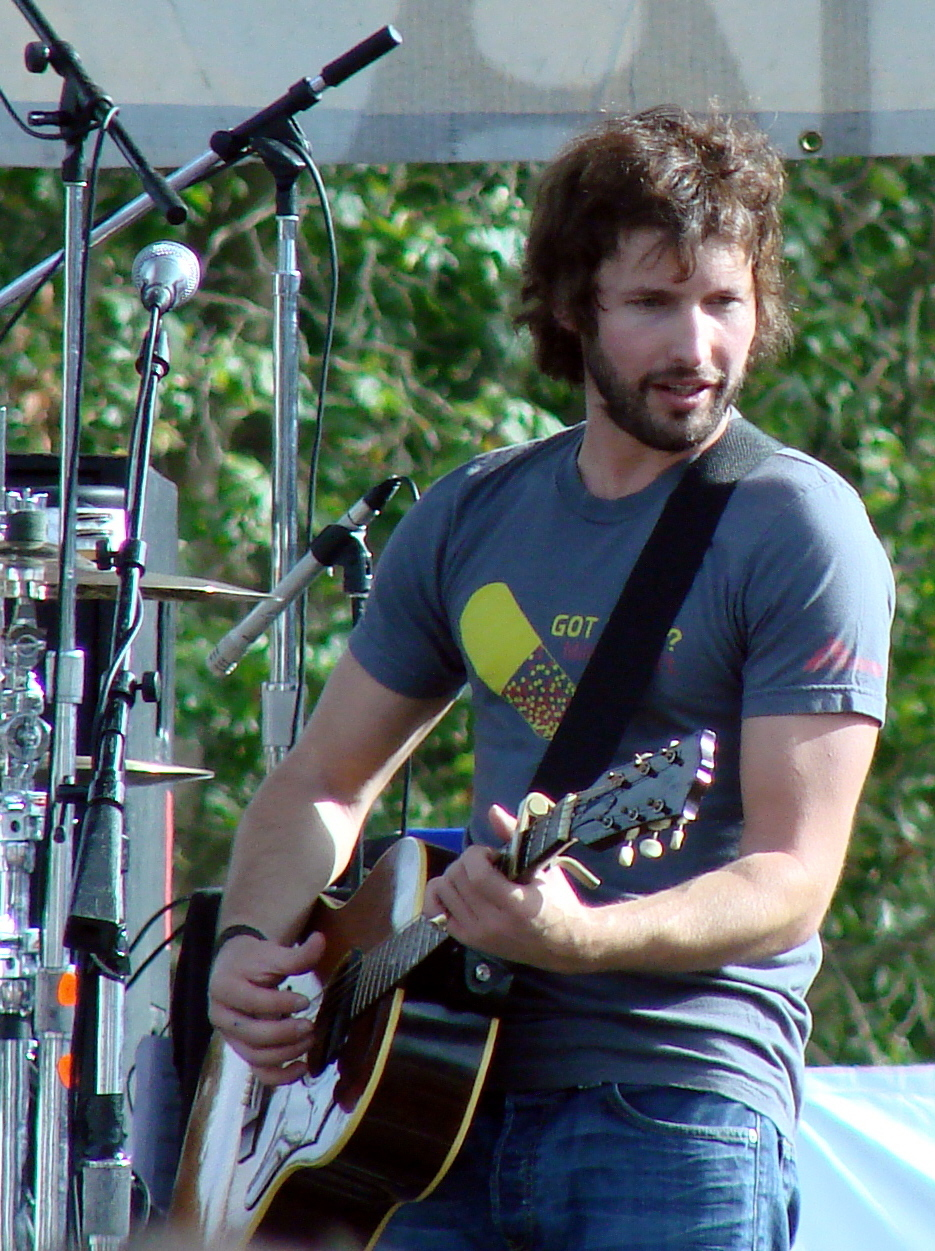
Blunt at a concert in Golden Gate Park in San Francisco, 2007

Blunt's second studio album, All the Lost Souls, was released in September 2007 in the United Kingdom and one day later in North America. It sold 65,000 units in its first week, and was certified gold in the UK after only four days. By the end of January 2008, the album had sold 600,000 copies in the UK, and 4.5 million copies internationally. Blunt completed the album's songs at his home in Ibiza, Spain, in the winter of 2006–2007. He performed five of the ten album tracks during his 2005–2006 tours; lyrics, melodies, and harmonies were refined for the studio recording, on which his touring band played and Tom Rothrock worked as producer.

While Blunt's first album received little critical attention, critics from every major music publication, and newspapers around the world, weighed in on All the Lost Souls. The album was met with generally mixed to positive reviews, and received a 53/100 rating at Metacritic. Eric Danton, of the Milwaukee Journal Sentinel and The Hartford Courant wrote that the album is "a collection so bland, it makes hardtack seem sumptuous". However, Kerri Mason of Billboard said Blunt "shows the abandon and confidence of a long-term artist, not just a one-hit wonder" and continued "there is not a misstep throughout". Equally effusive, Liz Hoggard of The Observer wrote that "it's impossible to resist Blunt's troubadour yearning."

The first single from All the Lost Souls, "1973", was inspired by Blunt's nights out at Pacha, an Ibiza club, which opened in that year. The song became another hit, reaching number one on the Billboard European Hot 100 Singles chart. D.J. Pete Tong remixed "1973" and played the track during his set at Pacha over the summer of 2007. The song was nominated as Best British Single at the Brit Awards in 2008. The second single, "Same Mistake", was released in early December 2007 but did not fare well in the UK charts, peaking at number 57. It was Number one in Brazil and a hit in many South American countries. The third single from the album was "Carry You Home", released in March 2008, peaking at number 20 in the U.K charts and bringing the album back into the Top 10, six months after its release. The fourth and final single from the original "All The Lost Souls" album was "I Really Want You".

Blunt collaborated twice during this album cycle. In late 2007, he worked with French rapper Sinik. They released "Je Réalise", which took elements of Blunt's song "I'll Take Everything", which hit the top three in France. On 14 November 2008, "Primavera in anticipo", Laura Pausini's new album, was released. The title track is a duet with Blunt. The album reached the Number one in Italy.

Throughout 2007 and 2008, Blunt went on his second world tour, including a performance in London's O2 Arena. In July and August 2008, he supported Sheryl Crow on a 25-date tour along with Toots and the Maytals. On 24 November 2008, All The Lost Souls was re-released as a deluxe edition, with new album artwork, new single "Love, Love, Love" and the documentary James Blunt: Return to Kosovo.

=== 2010–2013: Some Kind of Trouble ===
Blunt's third studio album titled Some Kind of Trouble, was released on 8 November 2010. The album debuted at number four in the UK with over 100,000 copies sold in the first week. The album's first single "Stay the Night" was released on 27 October 2010. The single did much better in Europe than the UK, sitting at number two on the European Airplay Chart for five consecutive weeks, but only charting at number 37 in the UK top 40. The second single from the album, "So Far Gone" was released in the UK in January 2011. The third single from the album, "If Time Is All I Have" was released in the UK in April 2011. Overall critical reception has been mixed, with Allmusic saying, in a positive review, that "Some Kind of Trouble is a step in the right direction for Blunt, a move toward love songs free of pretension" whilst BBC Music felt "When all's said, Some Kind of Trouble is not a terrible record by any means, but there's little sense that Blunt has advanced, and equally little sense that it'll make any difference to his bottom line."

As of February 2011, worldwide sales stood at over one million copies. By 2013 Blunt had sold over 20 million records worldwide.

=== 2013–2019: Moon Landing, The Afterlove and Walk Away ===
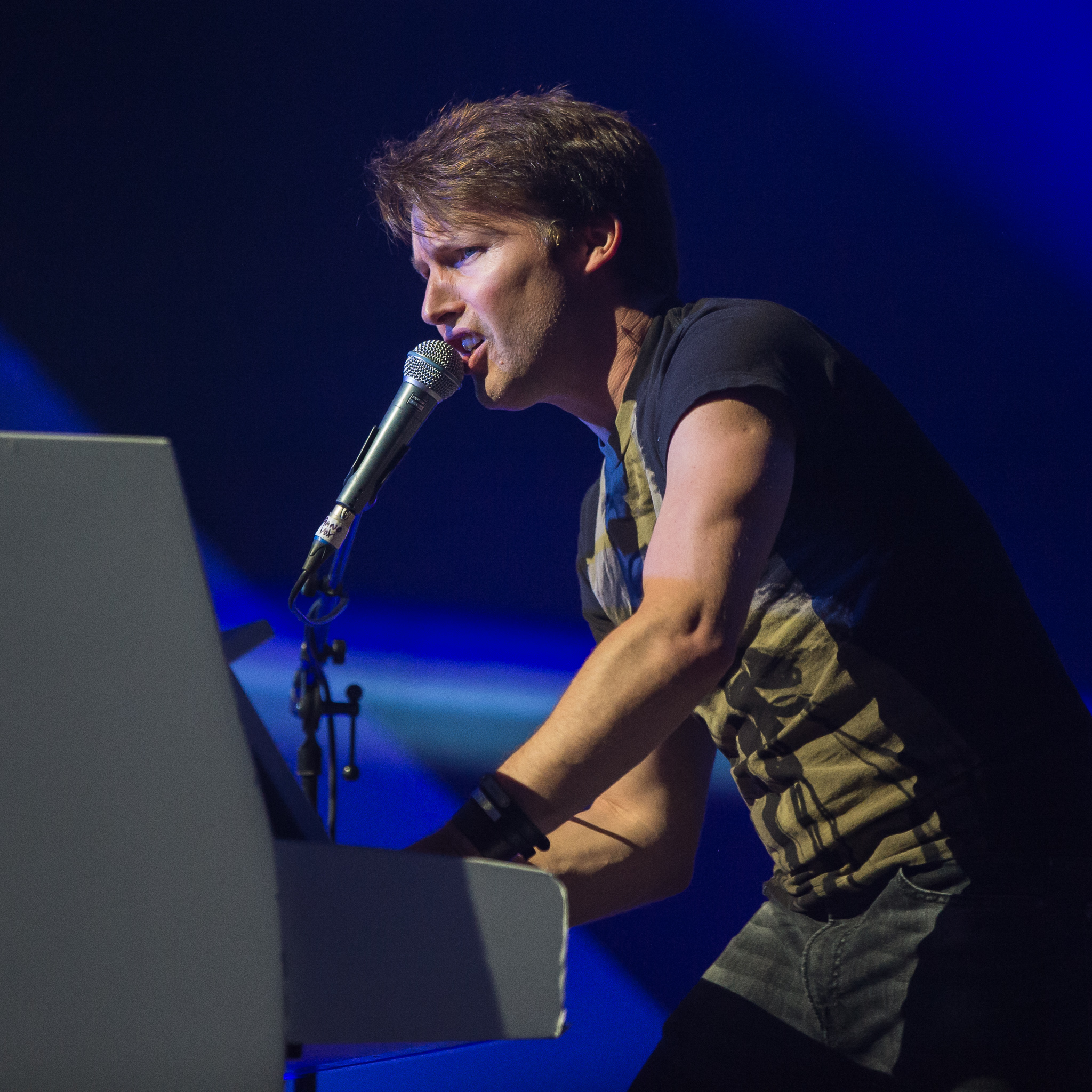
Blunt performing in Nuremberg, Germany, October 2017

Blunt's fourth album, Moon Landing, was released in October 2013. It featured production from Back to Bedlam producer Tom Rothrock. The lead single, "Bonfire Heart", debuted at number six before peaking at number four the following week in the UK Singles Chart. The single went to number 1 in Australia, Germany, Switzerland and Austria, and was in the top 10 in several other countries.

In September 2014, Blunt confirmed on his official Instagram account that Moon Landing would be re-released in November 2014. The new version of the album was named Moon Landing – Apollo Edition and contained 19 tracks: 11 from the original disc, plus the three bonus tracks of the deluxe version ("Telephone", "Kiss This Love Goodbye", and "Hollywood") and five new tracks ("Smoke Signals", "When I Find Love Again", "Breathe", "Trail of Broken Hearts", and "Working it Out"). The new track "When I Find Love Again" was released as a single that same day, after being played on BBC's Radio 2 for the first time. The official music video for "When I Find Love Again" was released on 14 October 2014. The new version of the album also contains a 19-track live DVD recorded during Blunt's performance in the 2014 edition of the Paléo Festival, Switzerland. Blunt toured the album in 2014–15, with the run spanning more than 150 shows across the Americas, Europe, Australasia, Asia, and Africa; it included his first concert in Israel, in Tel Aviv.

In May 2015, Blunt was confirmed to be replacing Ronan Keating on the seventh season of The X Factor Australia. He was joined by American rock musician Chris Isaak and returning judges Guy Sebastian and Dannii Minogue. In early 2016, Blunt announced via his newsletter that he had started work on his fifth album. Titled The Afterlove, it was released in March 2017. In 2019, Blunt collaborated with German DJ and producer Alle Farben to release "Walk Away" in the dance music genre.

=== 2019–2025: Once Upon a Mind and Who We Used to Be ===
Blunt's sixth album, Once Upon a Mind, was released in October 2019. He released the song "Cold" as the lead single on 29 August. His first "greatest hits" album The Stars Beneath My Feet (2004–2021) was released in November 2021 and included four new songs, two of them released as singles: "Love Under Pressure" and "Unstoppable". A Greatest Hits tour followed, with UK dates in February 2022.

In August 2023, Blunt announced his seventh album, Who We Used to Be, which was released in October 2023, while releasing a single "Beside You" from the album on the same day. Blunt then released singles "All The Love That I Ever Needed" and "The Girl That Never Was", the latter of which was written about Blunt and his wife losing a child through miscarriage. The album was released the same day as Blunt's "non-memoir" Loosely Based on a Made-Up Story: A Non-Memoir. An in-depth documentary about Blunt's life and career, titled One Brit Wonder, is to be released in UK cinemas for one night only in December 2023. Blunt toured the album in 2024.

Blunt released a 20th anniversary edition of Back to Bedlam on 11 October 2024, featuring previously unreleased demos. To promote the album, Blunt promised to legally change his name to one of the public's choosing if the album peaked at No. 1 in the UK Albums Chart, with the public choosing the name Blunty McBluntface. The reissue only went to No. 7 in the charts, thus Blunt kept his original name.

In April 2025, Blunt released the single "Tears Dry Tonight", a collaboration with Australian DJ Cyril. The song debuted at number 39 on the UK Singles Downloads Chart, and at number 12 on the New Zealand Hot Singles Chart.

=== 2026–present: Airplane Mode ===
In August 2026, Blunt released the single "Tastes Like Summer". On 3 September 2026, Blunt announced his eighth studio album, Airplane Mode, which was released on 6 November 2026, with a tour to support the album beginning in February 2027. A second single from the album, "Weight of It All" was released on the same day. A third single from the album, "Circles" was released on 2 October 2026. Blunt used his self-deprecating humour to promote Airplane Mode, releasing pre-orders of the new album with branded and signed air-sick bags that he joked were "the best accompaniment to my music".

In October 2026 Blunt starred in series two of BBC One's The Celebrity Traitors. The publicity Blunt received from his appearance on the programme has been cited as a contributing factor to Airplane Mode reaching No. 1 on the UK Albums Chart, a first for Blunt's releases in 19 years.

As part of the promotion of the album, Blunt promised to legally change his name to Ryan Air, after Irish airline Ryanair, if the album reached No. 1 on the UK Albums Chart. On 16 November 2026, Blunt posted a screenshot of a supposed deed poll application asking to change his name to Ryan Bel Air.

== Personal life ==
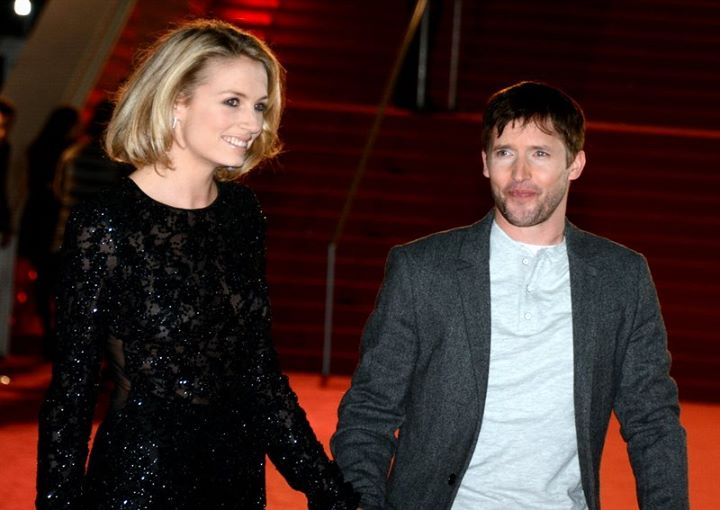
Blunt and his wife Sofia at the NRJ Music Awards in December 2013

Blunt primarily resides on the Spanish island of Ibiza. He also owns a chalet in the Swiss Alpine village of Verbier, where he has a ski lift named after him. In 2012, alongside motorcycle racer Carl Fogarty and rugby player Lawrence Dallaglio, he opened a restaurant at the top of the ski lift called La Vache. The same year, he was a victim of the News International phone hacking affair and filed for damages in a civil case.

In September 2014, Blunt married Sofia Wellesley, the granddaughter of Valerian Wellesley, 8th Duke of Wellington. Blunt and Wellesley have two sons; the godfather of their elder son is Ed Sheeran, and the godmother was Carrie Fisher.

Blunt received an honorary Doctor of Music (Hon DMus) degree from the University of Bristol in 2016.

Blunt is an active user of Twitter with over two million followers and a feed notable for self-deprecating humour. In 2020, Constable published a compendium of his tweets as a book called How to Be a Complete and Utter Blunt: Diary of a Reluctant Social Media Sensation.

In November 2026, Blunt claimed that he had changed his name by enrolled deed poll to Ryan Bel Air, alleging he was keeping his promise to do so if his album Airplane Mode went to number one.

== Charity work ==
Blunt was a patron of Help for Heroes, a charity that raises money to provide better facilities for wounded British servicemen, and has also held benefit concerts for this charity.

He has raised funds for the medical charity Médecins Sans Frontières. He first encountered the non-governmental organisation while on operations in Kosovo. Since then, he has been an active supporter by holding meet-and-greet auctions at many of his concerts, and filming the documentary Return to Kosovo, in which he visited the people and places he had encountered while there.

Blunt also has supported environmental causes. He screened the trailer for An Inconvenient Truth at his concerts, and for each advance sales concert ticket purchased through his designated website, a tree is planted. On 7 July 2007, he performed at the Live Earth concert at Wembley Stadium in London.

He contributed to the charity single, "Everybody Hurts" in aid of the 2010 Haiti earthquake appeal.

== Discography ==
- Back to Bedlam (2004)
- All the Lost Souls (2007)
- Some Kind of Trouble (2010)
- Moon Landing (2013)
- The Afterlove (2017)
- Once Upon a Mind (2019)
- Who We Used to Be (2023)
- Airplane Mode (2026)

== Videography ==
- The X Factor

== Tours ==
Headlining

- Back to Bedlam World Tour (2005–2006)
- All the Lost Souls Tour (2008–2009)
- Some Kind of Trouble Tour (2011–2012)
- Moon Landing World Tour (2014–2015)
- The Afterlove Tour (2017–2018)
- Once Upon a Mind Tour (2020)
- The Stars Beneath My Feet Tour (2022)
- Who We Used to Be Tour (2024)
- Back to Bedlam 20th Anniversary Tour (2025)
- Airplane Mode Tour (2027)

Opening act

- 2004 Tour (for Elton John) (2004)
- The Secret Migration Promo Tour (for Mercury Rev) (2004)
- Peachtree Road Tour (for Elton John) (2004)
- Fall Tour 2005 (for Jason Mraz) (2005)
- 2008 Summer Tour (for Sheryl Crow) (2008)
- ÷ Tour (for Ed Sheeran) (2017)

== Awards and nominations ==
=== American Music Awards ===
Year	Nominee / work	Award	Result	Ref.
2006	James Blunt	Breakthrough Artist	Nominated	

=== Brit Awards ===
Year	Nominee / work	Award	Result
2006	James Blunt	British Pop Act	Won
2006	James Blunt	British Male Solo Artist	Won
2006	James Blunt	British Breakthrough Act	Nominated
2006	Back to Bedlam	British Album of the Year	Nominated
2006	"You're Beautiful"	British Single of the Year	Nominated
2008	"1973"	British Single of the Year	Nominated

=== BT Digital Music Awards ===
Year	Nominee / work	Award	Result
2005	James Blunt	Best Pop Artist	Won

=== ECHO Awards ===
Year	Nominee / work	Award	Result	Ref.
2006	James Blunt	Best International Newcomer	Won	
2006	James Blunt	Best International Male	Nominated	
2008	James Blunt	Best International Male	Won	
2014	James Blunt	Best International Male	Nominated	
2015	James Blunt	Best International Male	Nominated	

=== Grammy Awards ===
Year	Nominee / work	Award	Result
2007	James Blunt	Best New Artist	Nominated
2007	"You're Beautiful"	Record of the Year	Nominated
2007	"You're Beautiful"	Song of the Year	Nominated
2007	"You're Beautiful"	Best Male Pop Vocal Performance	Nominated
2007	Back to Bedlam	Best Pop Vocal Album	Nominated

=== Hungarian Music Awards ===
Year	Nominee / work	Award	Result	Ref.
2009	All the Lost Souls	Foreign Classic Pop/Rock Album	Nominated	
2014	Moon Landing	Foreign Classic Pop/Rock Album	Won	
2020	Once Upon a Mind	Foreign Classic Pop/Rock Album	Nominated	

=== MTV Australia Awards ===
Year	Nominee / work	Award	Result
2006	"You're Beautiful"	Song of the Year	Won
2006	"You're Beautiful"	Best Male Artist	Nominated

=== MTV Europe Music Awards ===
Year	Nominee / work	Award	Result
2005	James Blunt	Best New Act	Won
2005	James Blunt	Best UK & Ireland Act	Nominated
2005	"You're Beautiful"	Best Song	Nominated

=== MTV Video Music Awards ===
Year	Nominee / work	Award	Result
2006	"You're Beautiful"	Best New Artist	Nominated
2006	"You're Beautiful"	Best Male Video	Won
2006	"You're Beautiful"	Best Cinematography	Won

=== Q Awards ===
Year	Nominee / work	Award	Result
2005	James Blunt	Best New Act	Won
2005	"You're Beautiful"	Best Track	Nominated
2005	Back to Bedlam	Best Album	Nominated

=== Teen Choice Awards ===
Year	Nominee / work	Award	Result
2006	James Blunt	Choice Music: Male Artist	Won
2006	James Blunt	Choice Music: Breakout Male Artist	Nominated
2006	"You're Beautiful"	Choice Music: Single	Nominated
2006	"You're Beautiful"	Choice Music: Love Song	Nominated

=== 2006 ===
- NRJ Music Award (France) – Best International Newcomer
- NME Awards – Worst Album
- Ivor Novello Awards – Most Performed Work and International Hit of the Year
- World Music Awards – Best New Artist in the World and Biggest Selling British Artist in the World
- Premios 40 Principales – Mejor Artista Revelación Internacional (Nominated)

=== 2007 ===
- IFPI Hong Kong Top Sales Music Awards – Top 10 Best Selling Foreign Albums All the Lost Souls

=== 2010 ===
- Virgin Media Music Awards – The Hottes

=== 2011 ===
- Elele Magazine Teen Idol of Turkey 2011

=== 2014 ===
- NME Awards for Best Band Blog or Twitter (nominated)
- Hungarian Music Awards – Pop/Rock Album of the Year for Moon Landing

=== 2016 ===
- Honorary doctorate from the University of Bristol

== Bibliography ==
- Hardy, Peter (2010). Different Country, Same State. London: Headline Publishing Group. ISBN 9780755319947. Retrieved 25 August 2013.
