= No Bravery =

Single by James Blunt

from the album Back to Bedlam
- Released: 17 April 2006
- Recorded: 2004 (Los Angeles, California)
- Genre: Pop rock
- Length: 4:02
- Label: Atlantic, Custard Records
- Songwriters: James Blunt, Sacha Skarbek
- Producers: Tom Rothrock, Linda Perry

James Blunt singles chronology
"Wisemen (re-release)" (2006)	"No Bravery" (2006)	"1973" (2007)

"No Bravery" is a pop rock song written by British singer James Blunt and Sacha Skarbek for Blunt's debut album, Back to Bedlam. The song was produced by Tom Rothrock and Jimmy Hogarth and received a positive reception from music critics. The song is written about the Kosovo war while Blunt was serving there with NATO peacekeepers. It was released as the fifth single in April 2006, exclusively in France. The track peaked at No. 15 there.

== Release ==
The single was released on one physical format, including the album version of the track backed with an exclusive live version recorded at 93 Feet East in London.

== Music video ==
"No Bravery" featured a music video that was directed by Paul Heyes and was filmed on 11 February 2006 in The Far East. In the video, Blunt is featured walking through a Kosovo war zone, reflecting on his army days and remembering events that made him into the man he is today. The video also shows the death of a British soldier and the heartache of his family.

== Track listings ==
1. "No Bravery" – 4:02
2. "No Bravery" (Live) – 3:33

== Release history ==
Country	Release date
France	17 April 2006
United States	8 March 2006 (Radio Airplay only)

== Chart performance ==
Chart (2006)	Peak position
France (SNEP)	15

== See also ==
- Incident at Pristina airport
