= You're Beautiful =

2005 single by James Blunt

Single by James Blunt

from the album Back to Bedlam
- B-side: "Fall at Your Feet" (Acoustic)
- Released: 30 May 2005
- Recorded: 2004
- Genre: Pop rock; soft rock; alternative rock
- Length: 3:32 (album version); 3:22 (single edit)
- Label: Atlantic; Custard
- Songwriters: James Blunt; Sacha Skarbek; Amanda Ghost
- Producer: Tom Rothrock

James Blunt singles chronology
"Wisemen" (2005)	"You're Beautiful" (2005)	"High (re-release)" (2005)

Audio sample
- file; help

Music video
- "You're Beautiful" on YouTube^{[a]}

"You're Beautiful" is a song by the English singer-songwriter James Blunt. It was written by Blunt, Sacha Skarbek and Amanda Ghost for Blunt's debut album, Back to Bedlam (2004). It was released as the third single of the album in 2005.

In the United Kingdom and Australia, the song reached number one and number two respectively. When released in Canada and the United States, it reached number one on both charts and received widespread airplay. In 2006, the song won an Ivor Novello Award for airplay. The song has sold 625,000 copies in the U.K. as stated by the Official Charts Company, and by October 2012 over three million in the U.S., where it remains Blunt's biggest hit single to date, and his only one to reach the top 40 of the U.S. Billboard Hot 100.

In 2012, a new version of the single was issued in Japan. The Q;indivi+ Remix, featuring Japanese performer Keri, was issued on 28 March 2012.

== Composition ==
The song is performed in the key of E♭ major.

== Writing and inspiration ==
Newspapers have claimed that "You're Beautiful" is about a former girlfriend of Blunt's, Dixie Chassay, casting assistant for the Harry Potter films, although Blunt refuses to confirm or deny this. On 8 March 2006 on The Oprah Winfrey Show, Blunt said of the song, "It's kind of miserable. It was about seeing my ex-girlfriend on the Underground in London with her new man, who I didn't know existed. She and I caught eyes and lived a lifetime in that moment, but didn't do anything about it and haven't seen each other since." According to Blunt, he wrote the lyrics of the song at home in two minutes after meeting her. Blunt also recounts Ryan Adams's song "La Cienega Just Smiled" serving as the inspiration for the backing track. He then finished the song with Sacha Skarbek in Los Angeles, with Amanda Ghost also credited as a co-writer. Blunt said of the song: "It's always been portrayed as romantic, but it's actually a bit creepy. It's about a guy (me) who's high and stalking someone else's girlfriend on the subway. And then the stalker kills himself." In an interview with HitQuarters, co-writer Sacha Skarbek said that Blunt brought the title, verses, and the approach of the chorus to a songwriting session. Skarbek's contribution largely focused on the music aspect to the track, contributing chord ideas for the verses, honing the melodies, and making sure the song stuck to, "a couple of key hooks rather than making it too complicated".

Several versions of the song exist. One lyrical version has a vulgar word in it ("She could see from my face that I was fucking high") which was released on Back to Bedlam and most of the "You're Beautiful" singles. The radio edit of the song replaces the lyric, changing it to "She could see from my face that I was flying high". Acoustic, live, and DVD versions have also been released. However, because of the word in question, the album was given a Parental Advisory sticker. When asked about the song, Blunt responded, "It's probably one of the least meaningful songs on the album and by no means people's favourite. The album is like a book covering various aspects of life in a specific order."

At the beginning of the song, Blunt sings the first line twice ("My life is brilliant"). The mistimed delivery was left in the final recording but omitted in most radio versions. This is parodied in "Weird Al" Yankovic's song "You're Pitiful": After the initial start, he says "What, was I too early? Oh, sorry. Should I ... Do you wanna start over? Or, keep going? Okay. Now? Now?" and then begins the song again.

American Songwriter magazine compared the song to Elton John's "Candle in the Wind", writing "Blunt’s single is the stuff of adult contemporary gold: a mid-tempo ballad that’s smoothly-sung and yearningly sentimental."

== Music video ==
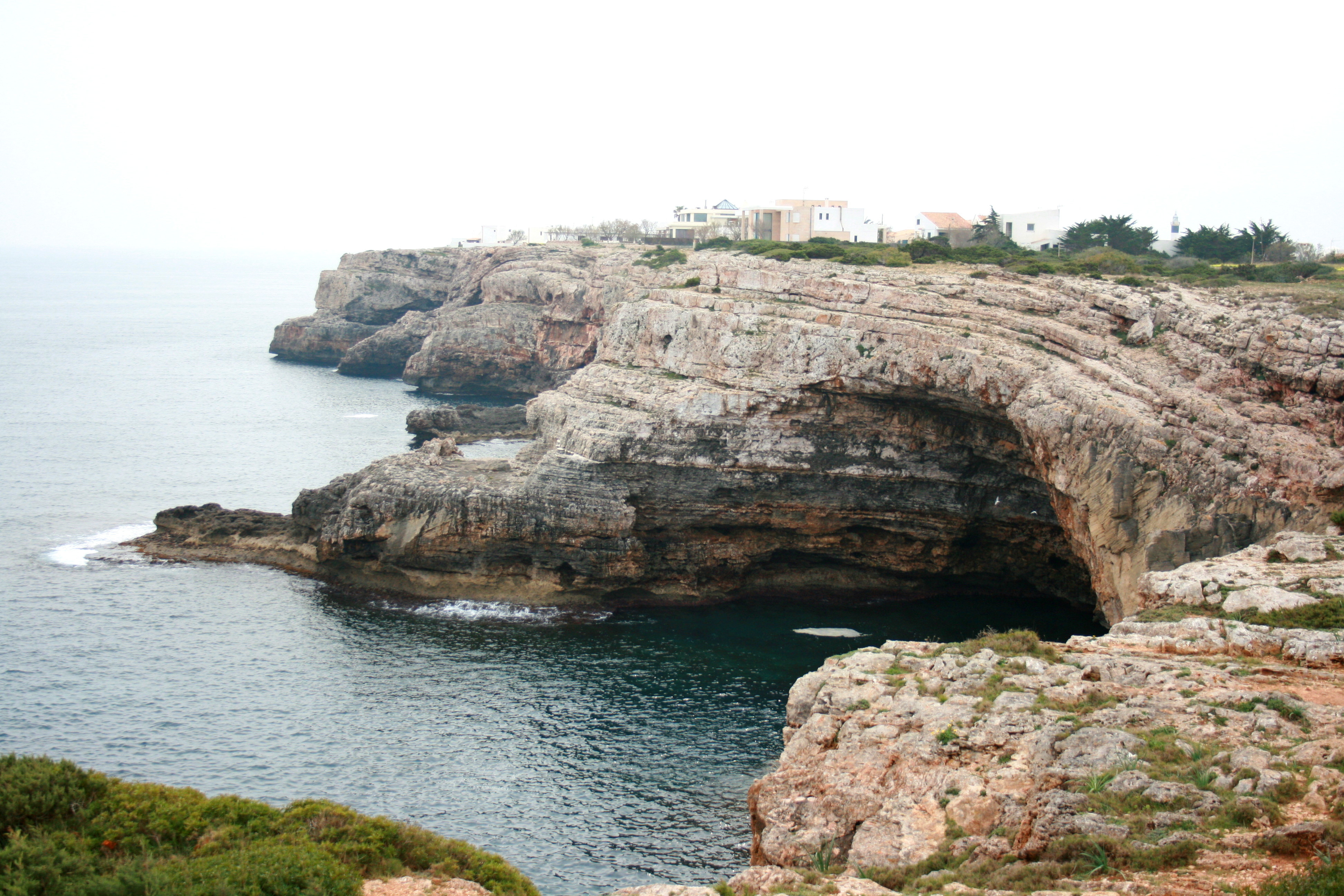
The video for "You're Beautiful" was filmed at Sa Cova Foradada in Portocolom.

The music video for "You're Beautiful" was filmed on 23 March 2005 at Sa Cova Foradada in Portocolom, Mallorca. It was directed by Sam Brown and Robbie Ryan, with Flynn Productions. Blunt removes the upper portion of his clothing in a cold, bare, snowy setting with the sea behind him and places all of his personal belongings on the ground. While doing this, seagulls circle overhead like buzzards. At the end of the video, he jumps off a cliff into the water while he sings the lyrics: "But it's time to face the truth, I will never be with you". According to Blunt, he had to jump twice and suffered a split lip in the jumps.

At least one writer's interpretation is that it shows Blunt taking his own life, perhaps following a Japanese tradition of removing one's shoes and contents of clothing prior to jumping from a great height. However, the director of the video states in a "making-of" piece of footage that "the idea [of the video] is built around the last line, where he says, 'I'll never be with you', and that idea of completely forgetting about something, of getting rid of that emotion, and moving on, and I think that the video is a sort of visual manifestation of that emotion."

On 9 November 2021, Blunt announced a 4K remaster of the video on his Instagram.^{^[a]}

The video has been parodied in a Dead Ringers spoof, with Jon Culshaw impersonating Blunt, singing the song with different lyrics where he explains how he can be cool.

== Critical reception and ubiquity ==
About.com gave the song four and a half stars out of five, saying "The simple power of Blunt's songwriting is effective at conveying the pain of realizing he will never be with the object of his affections."

"You're Beautiful" was ranked number seven in a poll conducted by Rolling Stone magazine to identify the 10 most annoying songs. VH1 ranked it number 95 on its list of the 100 Greatest Songs of the '00s. In October 2014, Blunt stated it had become so ubiquitous that it was "force-fed down people's throats". It has been named as one of the worst songs ever recorded, despite its positive critical reviews.

== Chart performance ==
"You're Beautiful" is Blunt's most successful single release to date. It was also his first successful single and reached number one in ten countries across the world, including the United Kingdom, the United States, Spain, Mexico, Canada, and the Netherlands. The song peaked within the top five in New Zealand, number four, Australia, number two, France, and Germany. Released on 18 May 2005, it entered at number twelve on 5 June and reached number one six weeks later where it remained for five consecutive weeks. The highest position "You're Beautiful" reached in Australia was number two, where it stayed for two consecutive weeks.

In November 2005, "You're Beautiful" was released in North America where it achieved widespread success. In Canada, it ascended to number one (where it remained for four consecutive weeks) 22 weeks following its debut on the BDS Airplay chart. In the United States, it debuted at number 88 before reaching number one 17 weeks later. It replaced Beyoncé's "Check on It" and itself was replaced by Ne-Yo's "So Sick".

The song became the first non-urban or American Idol song to reach the top of the U.S. Billboard Hot 100 since Nickelback's "How You Remind Me" in 2001. While "Hollaback Girl" by Gwen Stefani achieved the same accolade, it has been disputed due to the song's hip-hop-based influences. This also became the first single by a British artist to reach number one since Elton John's "Candle in the Wind 1997" (1997). It achieved success on the Billboard Pop 100, Hot Digital Songs, Adult Contemporary, and Adult Top 40 formats. Throughout 2006, it sold 1,623,417 digital copies. It has since been certified double platinum by the RIAA for digital and platinum for mastertone. It has sold over three million in the United States.

== Awards ==
The song received three nominations at the 2007 Grammy Awards: Record of the Year, Song of the Year and Best Male Pop Vocal Performance.

The song won the BMI Internet Award for most plays on BMI-licensed websites in 2007 and was the first song to receive this honor at BMI's London Awards.

== In popular culture ==
- In Stephen King's 2009 novel Under the Dome, a character named Robert Roux dies listening to the song on his iPod when he encounters the titular dome and breaks his spine in the first chapter.
- In the 2026 film Sunny Dancer, Blunt appears in a cameo, where he sings the song.

== Release ==
The single was released in four official physical formats. CD1 includes an exclusive acoustic recording of "Fall at Your Feet", a cover taken from the BBC Radio 1 live lounge sessions. CD2 includes an exclusive acoustic version of "High", plus the video for "You're Beautiful" and "Making-Of" footage. The 7" vinyl includes an exclusive acoustic version of "So Long, Jimmy". The fourth physical format was an exclusive version of CD1, only available at HMV, which includes an additional third track, in the form of an acoustic version of "You're Beautiful". This version was also sold in Australia.

== Track listing ==
UK CD single number one

1. "You're Beautiful" (Edit) – 3:22
2. "Fall at Your Feet" (Acoustic) – 2:25

UK CD single number two

1. "You're Beautiful" (Edit) – 3:22
2. "High" (Acoustic) – 4:03
3. "You're Beautiful" (The Making of the Video) – 3:00
4. "You're Beautiful" (Video) – 3:23

UK 7" single

1. "You're Beautiful" (Edit) – 3:22
2. "So Long, Jimmy" (Acoustic) – 4:14

Australian CD single

1. "You're Beautiful" (Edit) – 3:22
2. "Fall at Your Feet" (Acoustic) – 2:25
3. "You're Beautiful" (Acoustic) – 3:35

Japanese CD single

1. "You're Beautiful" (The Q;indivi+ Remix) (featuring Keri) – 3:28

== Release history ==
Country	Release date
United Kingdom	18 May 2005
Worldwide	30 May 2005
United States	13 December 2005
Japan (The Q;indivi+ Remix)	28 March 2012

== Charts ==
=== Weekly charts ===
Chart (2005–2013)	Peak position
Argentina (CAPIF)	3
Australia (ARIA)	2
Austria (Ö3 Austria Top 40)	6
Belgium (Ultratop 50 Flanders)	1
Belgium (Ultratop 50 Wallonia)	3
Canada Digital Song Sales (Billboard)	1
Canada AC Top 30 (Radio & Records)	1
Canada CHR/Pop Top 30 (Radio & Records)	7
Canada Hot AC Top 30 (Radio & Records)	3
Chile (Notimex)	4
CIS Airplay (TopHit)	19
Czech Republic (Rádio Top 100 Oficiální)	1
Denmark (Tracklisten)	4
Ecuador (Notimex)	1
France (SNEP)	5
Germany (GfK)	2
Hungary (Rádiós Top 40)	1
Ireland (IRMA)	1
Italy (FIMI)	21
Netherlands (Dutch Top 40)	1
Netherlands (Single Top 100)	1
New Zealand (Recorded Music NZ)	4
Norway (VG-lista)	1
Peru (Notimex)	5
Poland Airplay (ZPAV)	3
Russia Airplay (TopHit)	10
Scottish Singles Sales (Official Charts)	1
Spain (Promusicae)	43
Sweden (Sverigetopplistan)	1
Switzerland (Schweizer Hitparade)	2
UK Singles (Official Charts)	1
UK Airplay (Music Week)	1
Ukraine Airplay (TopHit)	124
US Billboard Hot 100	1
US Adult Alternative Airplay (Billboard)	4
US Adult Contemporary (Billboard)	1
US Adult Pop Airplay (Billboard)	1
US Pop 100 (Billboard)	1
US Pop Airplay (Billboard)	5

=== Year-end charts ===
Chart (2005)	Position
Australia (ARIA)	11
Austria (Ö3 Austria Top 40)	26
Belgium (Ultratop 50 Flanders)	4
Belgium (Ultratop 50 Wallonia)	20
CIS (TopHit)	72
France (SNEP)	87
Germany (Media Control GfK)	16
Hungary (Rádiós Top 40)	34
Netherlands (Dutch Top 40)	2
Netherlands (Single Top 100)	3
Russia Airplay (TopHit)	53
Sweden (Hitlistan)	6
Switzerland (Schweizer Hitparade)	11
UK Singles (OCC)	4
UK Airplay (Music Week)	1

Chart (2006)	Position
Austria (Ö3 Austria Top 40)	66
Belgium (Ultratop 50 Flanders)	74
Brazil (Crowley)	26
CIS (TopHit)	73
Italy (FIMI)	93
Russia Airplay (TopHit)	61
Switzerland (Schweizer Hitparade)	34
UK Singles (OCC)	123
US Billboard Hot 100	4
US Adult Contemporary (Billboard)	1
US Adult Top 40 (Billboard)	6

=== Decade-end charts ===
Chart (2000–2009)	Position
Germany (Media Control GfK)	85
Russia Airplay (TopHit)	111
UK Singles (OCC)	39
US Billboard Hot 100	86

=== All-time charts ===
All-time chart rankings for "You're Beautiful"
Chart	Rank
Dutch Love Songs (Dutch Top 40)	4

== Certifications ==
Certifications for You're Beautiful
Region	Certification	Certified units/sales
Australia (ARIA)	Platinum	70,000^{^}
Austria (IFPI Austria)	Gold	15,000^{*}
Belgium (BRMA)	Gold	25,000^{*}
Canada (Music Canada)	2× Platinum	40,000^{*}
Canada (Music Canada) Ringtone	Platinum	40,000^{*}
Denmark (IFPI Danmark)	Platinum	8,000^{^}
Germany (BVMI)	Platinum	300,000^{^}
Italy (FIMI) sales since 2009	2× Platinum	100,000^{‡}
Japan (RIAJ) Digital single	Platinum	250,000^{*}
Japan (RIAJ) Full-length ringtone	Gold	100,000^{*}
Japan (RIAJ) Ringtone	2× Platinum	500,000^{*}
Mexico (AMPROFON)	Gold	30,000^{*}
New Zealand (RMNZ)	3× Platinum	90,000^{‡}
Spain (Promusicae)	2× Platinum	120,000^{‡}
Sweden (GLF)	Platinum	20,000^{^}
Switzerland (IFPI Switzerland)	Gold	20,000^{^}
United Kingdom (BPI)	3× Platinum	1,800,000^{‡}
United States (RIAA)	4× Platinum	4,000,000^{‡}
United States (RIAA) Mastertone	Platinum	1,000,000^{*}
^{*} Sales figures based on certification alone.^{^} Shipments figures based on certification alone.^{‡} Sales+streaming figures based on certification alone.

== See also ==
- List of number-one singles from the 2000s (UK)
- List of Hot 100 number-one singles of 2006 (U.S.)
- List of Billboard Adult Contemporary number ones of 2006
