= Back to Bedlam =

Studio album by James Blunt
- Released: 11 October 2004
- Recorded: December 2003 - June 2004
- Studios: Conway, Hollywood, California; The Embassy, North Hollywood, California; Jimmy Hogarth's place, London
- Genres: Alternative rock; pop rock; folk rock
- Length: 39:28
- Labels: Atlantic; Custard
- Producers: Tom Rothrock; Linda Perry

James Blunt chronology
| Back to Bedlam (2004) | Chasing Time: The Bedlam Sessions (2006) |

Singles from Back to Bedlam
- 1. "High" Released: 18 October 2004; 2. "Wisemen" Released: 7 March 2005; 3. "You're Beautiful" Released: 18 May 2005; 4. "High (reissue)" Released: 3 October 2005; 5. "Goodbye My Lover" Released: 19 December 2005; 6. "Wisemen (reissue)" Released: 13 March 2006; 7. "No Bravery" Released: 17 April 2006

Alternative cover
- 2005 reissue cover

Back to Bedlam is the debut studio album by English singer-songwriter James Blunt, released on 11 October 2004 by Custard and Atlantic Records. It is named after the famous psychiatric institution of Bethlem Royal Hospital in London, which is commonly known as "Bedlam".

Initially lingering in the lower regions of the UK Albums Chart in its first few months of release, it became a major worldwide success after its third single, "You're Beautiful", became a worldwide hit in mid-2005. Back to Bedlam would go on to become the highest-selling album of 2005 in the UK, with over 2.4 million copies sold. By December 2009, the album had been certified 10× Platinum by the British Phonographic Industry for sales of over 3 million, making it the best-selling album of the 2000s in the UK. In 2011, it was overtaken by Amy Winehouse's Back to Black as the best-selling album of the 21st century in the UK. Back to Bedlam currently ranks as the 18th-best-selling album in UK chart history, and the biggest-selling debut album by a British artist. As of 2017, it has sold 3.33 million copies in the UK, and over 14.1 million copies worldwide.

== Background and recording ==
Blunt had piano and violin lessons as a child, but his first significant exposure to popular music was at Harrow School. There, he was introduced to the guitar by a fellow student, and started playing the instrument and writing songs at age 14. At University of Bristol, his undergraduate thesis was The Commodification of Image – Production of a Pop Idol; one of his main references for the thesis was sociologist and rock critic, Simon Frith, chairman of the Mercury Music Prize panel of judges since 1992.

Because the British Army sponsored his university education, Blunt was obliged to serve a minimum of four years in the armed forces. He stated on an interview in his Back to Bedlam sessions that he chose to join the military as his father was "pushing for it, so that [Blunt] could obtain a secure work placement and income". Blunt trained at the Royal Military Academy Sandhurst. While still in the army, he worked on demos during his time off. A backing vocalist and songwriting collaborator suggested he contact Elton John's manager Todd Interland, with whom she used to share a house. Interland told HitQuarters that he listened to Blunt's demo while driving home and after hearing the track "Goodbye My Lover", pulled over and called the mobile number written on the CD to set up a meeting.

Blunt left the British Army in 2002 so that he could pursue his musical career. It was at that period that he started using the stage name "Blunt", in part to make it easier for others to spell; "Blount" is pronounced the same way, and remains his legal surname. Shortly after leaving the army, he was signed to EMI music publishers and Twenty-First Artists management. A record contract remained elusive, with label executives pointing to Blunt's posh speaking voice as a barrier in class-divided Britain. Linda Perry, who was just launching her own label Custard Records in early 2003, heard Blunt's promotional tape when visiting London, and soon after heard him perform live at the South by Southwest Music Festival. She made an offer to him the same night and within a few days, Blunt signed a recording contract with Perry, and one month later he was in Los Angeles working with producer Tom Rothrock.

Blunt recorded Back to Bedlam from December 2003 to June 2004 with producer Tom Rothrock at Rothrock's home studio, using session musicians and performing on many different instruments himself. While in Los Angeles, he lodged with actress Carrie Fisher, whom he had met through the family of a former girlfriend. Fisher was very supportive of Blunt's aspirations, suggesting the name of the album and providing use of a bathroom in her home for Blunt to record the song "Goodbye My Lover".

Back to Bedlam's album cover was photographed on 3 August 2004 and designed by Salvador Design.

Due to release delays, Back to Bedlam was released on 11 October 2004 as a limited-edition digipak. By 24 November 2004, the digipak went out of circulation and further pressings were distributed with the updated blue reissue cover.

== Critical reception ==
Professional ratings
Review scores
| Source | Rating |
|---|---|
| AllMusic | 4/5 stars |
| Common Sense Media | 4/5 stars |
| Q | 4/5 stars |
| BBC Collective | 5/5 stars |
| IndieLondon | (positive) |
| RocknWorld | 4/5 stars |
| About.com | 8.6/10 |
| Slant Magazine | 3.5/5 stars |
| Relevant | (positive) |

Critics responded to Back to Bedlam with acclaim. AllMusic felt "...the soulful British crooner James Blunt's wistful debut infuses the listener – in order – with rainy-day hope, the wistful comfort of unattainable love, and finally world-weary resignation. While his parched and effeminate falsetto recalls Gasoline Alley-era Rod Stewart with a healthy dose of Antony and the Johnsons, it's the late Elliott Smith who casts the largest shadow on Back to Bedlam." Q magazine and Common Sense Media awarded the album four stars out of five. RocknWorld stated: "It's hard to describe James Blunt or his music without falling prey to many a cliché or hyperbole. Comes from the UK, serves in the army then makes an album of movingly sincere ballads which make a huge impression on his homeland and Australia, thus allowing him to enjoy phenomenal, chart-topping success. However, in this case, the music Blunt is making does really deserve and warrant the hype surrounding him. Strangely enough, even with his music being all over the radio here in Australia, I cannot begrudge the fact that Blunt is truly talented and has made himself a damn good debut record." BBC Collective said: "It's very rare I give an album 5 stars. Many have come close, but just missing it. I never thought i would say this, but Back To Bedlam has not got one bad track on it. I've listened to it 3 times back to back, just to make sure." Slant Magazine said, in a three-and-a-half-star review, "Bedlam is an overall raw listening experience" and that, though "Blunt's writing often juxtaposes love with death", it's "More reason for American girls to go gaga over this able British bloke."

Indie London praised the album, calling it "...a masterful debut and one which you mustn't allow to pass you by." In a four-star review, About.com said: "To aptly describe James Blunt's music in his debut album Back to Bedlam, it would be an injustice to ignore the backdrop of his past and its relation to his music – in fact it's impossible to do so" and gave praise to the songs which they called "Hauntingly captivating, his words paint the pictures of many stories lived, masterly recited through his songs. Back to Bedlam seems not so much a pop compilation as it does a reflection of a life through the art of music." Nate Murray of Relevant gave a similar review, and compared his work to the likes of Elliott Smith, calling it "endearingly honest" and continued "...like any great writer, he invites the reader, or in this case, the listener, into the intimate details of life that resonate with most anyone. Combine such candid writing with a voice one interviewer has called 'disgustingly gorgeous', and you have a recipe for musical addiction. Blunt's talents have earned the endorsement of Elton John and led to comparisons with John’s early work, as well as the late Elliott Smith."

Mark Beaumont, writing for NME in 2016, included it on his list of eight of the all-time best-selling albums in the UK that have no redeeming features whatsoever, dubbing it the "most whiney, nails-down-a-blackboard posh-boy soul album in history."

== Track listing ==
| No. | Title | Writer(s) | Producer(s) | Length |
|---|---|---|---|---|
| 1. | "High" | James Blunt; Ricky Ross | Tom Rothrock | 4:03 |
| 2. | "You're Beautiful" | Blunt; Sacha Skarbek; Amanda Ghost | Rothrock | 3:33 |
| 3. | "Wisemen" | Blunt; Skarbek; Jimmy Hogarth | Rothrock, Hogarth | 3:42 |
| 4. | "Goodbye My Lover" | Blunt; Skarbek | Rothrock | 4:20 |
| 5. | "Tears and Rain" | Blunt; Guy Chambers | Rothrock | 4:04 |
| 6. | "Out of My Mind" | Blunt | Rothrock | 3:33 |
| 7. | "So Long, Jimmy" | Blunt; Hogarth | Rothrock | 4:26 |
| 8. | "Billy" | Blunt; Skarbek; Ghost | Rothrock | 3:37 |
| 9. | "Cry" | Blunt; Skarbek | Rothrock | 4:06 |
| 10. | "No Bravery" | Blunt; Skarbek | Linda Perry | 4:00 |
| Total length: | | | | 39:28 |

Japanese bonus tracks
| No. | Title | Length |
|---|---|---|
| 11. | "You're Beautiful" (acoustic) | 3:31 |
| 12. | "No Bravery" (live) | 3:41 |

US iTunes bonus track
| No. | Title | Writer(s) | Length |
|---|---|---|---|
| 11. | "Fall at Your Feet" (acoustic) | Neil Finn | 2:25 |

Australian iTunes bonus tracks
| No. | Title | Length |
|---|---|---|
| 11. | "Goodbye My Lover" (acoustic) | 5:06 |
| 12. | "You're Beautiful" (acoustic) | 3:31 |
| 13. | "You're Beautiful" (video) | 5:06 |
| 14. | "Goodbye My Lover" (video) | 5:06 |
| 15. | "High" (video) | 3:54 |

Expanded edition bonus disc – Live in Ireland (U.S.)
| No. | Title | Length |
|---|---|---|
| 1. | "Wisemen" |
| 2. | "High" |
| 3. | "Cry" |
| 4. | "Goodbye My Lover" |
| 5. | "So Long, Jimmy" |
| 6. | "Sugar Coated" |
| 7. | "You're Beautiful" |
| 8. | "Billy" |
| 9. | "Fall at Your Feet" |
| 10. | "Tears and Rain" |
| 11. | "No Bravery" |
| 12. | "Where Is My Mind?" |
| 13. | "Goodbye My Lover" (video) |
| 14. | "Goodbye My Lover" (Making of the Video) |

Best Buy bonus DVD (U.S.)
| No. | Title | Length |
|---|---|---|
| 1. | "Back to Bedlam" (E.P.K.) |
| 2. | "You're Beautiful" (video) |
| 3. | "Live @93 Feet East" (video) |
| 4. | "High" (video) |

Target Stores bonus disc – Monkey on My Shoulder (U.S.)
| No. | Title | Length |
|---|---|---|
| 1. | "Cry" (demo) |
| 2. | "High" (demo) |
| 3. | "Goodbye My Lover" (demo) |
| 4. | "Sugar Coated" (demo) |
| 5. | "Butterfly" (demo) |

French edition bonus DVD – Live in Paris
| No. | Title | Length |
|---|---|---|
| 1. | "Billy" |
| 2. | "High" |
| 3. | "Out of My Mind" |
| 4. | "No Bravery" |
| 5. | "Goodbye My Lover" |
| 6. | "So Long, Jimmy" |
| 7. | "Wisemen" |
| 8. | "Where Is My Mind?" |
| 9. | "You're Beautiful" |

20th anniversary edition bonus disc
| No. | Title | Length |
|---|---|---|
| 1. | "High" (demo) |
| 2. | "You're Beautiful" (demo) |
| 3. | "Wisemen" (demo) |
| 4. | "Goodbye My Lover" (early performance) |
| 5. | "Tears and Rain" (demo) |
| 6. | "Out of My Mind" (demo) |
| 7. | "So Long, Jimmy" (early performance) |
| 8. | "Billy" (demo) |
| 9. | "Cry" (early performance) |
| 10. | "No Bravery" (demo) |
| 11. | "Sugar-Coated" |
| 12. | "Butterfly" (demo) |
| 13. | "Dancing Days" (demo) |
| 14. | "Close Your Eyes" (demo) |
| 15. | "Standing All Alone" (demo) |

== Personnel ==
- James Blunt – lead vocals; guitars (tracks 1, 5, 6, 9); organ on (tracks 3, 4, 6, 9); piano (tracks 1, 4, 5, 10); Wurlitzer electric piano (tracks 5, 6, 7); acoustic guitar (tracks 2, 7); Rhodes piano (tracks 3, 4); keyboards and marimba (track 1); classical guitar (track 3); twelve-string guitar (track 4); church organ (track 5); backing vocals (track 6); grand piano (track 8); mellotron (track 9)
- Sasha Krivtsov – bass (all tracks except 4, 7, 10); backing vocals (track 6)
- Charlie Paxson (Note: Credited as Charlie Paxton) – drums (all tracks except 10); backing vocals (track 6)
- John Nau – Hammond organ (tracks 3, 5–7, 8); Wurlitzer electric piano (tracks 1, 3, 8, 9); piano (track 2); guitar sustain (track 4); backing vocals (track 6); tack piano (track 8)
- Eric Gorfain – strings (tracks 2, 4, 5)
- Richard Dodd - strings (tracks 2, 4, 5)
- The Section Quartet – strings (tracks 2, 4, 5)
- John "Gumby" Goodwin – electric guitar (track 3); backing vocals (track 6); slide guitar solo (track 7)
- Matt Chait – guitar sample (track 4); electric guitar (track 7); guitar (track 8)
- Jimmy Hogarth – acoustic guitar and keyboards (track 3)
- Sacha Skarbek – Rhodes piano (track 3)
- Amanda Ghost – backing vocals (track 3)
- Guy Chambers – guitar feedback (track 5)
- Tom Rothrock – backing vocals (track 6)
- W. Vincent – bass (track 8)
- The Producer – slide guitar (track 9)
- Linda Perry – guitar and production (track 10)
- P. III – bass (track 10)
- Brian McCloud – drums (track 10)
- Tom Rothrock – production, mixing
- Mike Tarantino – engineering; lead guitar (track 1); electric guitar (track 2); Mississippi guitar (track 7)
- David Guerrero – engineering (track 10)
- John Morrical – engineering assistance
- Andrew Chavez – engineering assistance (track 10)
- Don Tyler – mastering

== Charts ==
=== Weekly charts ===
| Chart (2004–2024) | Peak position |
|---|---|
| Australian Albums (ARIA) | 1 |
| Austrian Albums (Ö3 Austria) | 1 |
| Belgian Albums (Ultratop Flanders) | 1 |
| Belgian Albums (Ultratop Wallonia) | 1 |
| Canadian Albums (Billboard) | 1 |
| Croatian International Albums (HDU) | 1 |
| Danish Albums (Hitlisten) | 1 |
| Dutch Albums (Album Top 100) | 2 |
| European Albums (Billboard) | 1 |
| Finnish Albums (Suomen virallinen lista) | 10 |
| French Albums (SNEP) | 2 |
| German Albums (Offizielle Top 100) | 1 |
| Greek Albums (IFPI Greece) | 1 |
| Hungarian Albums (MAHASZ) | 17 |
| Irish Albums (IRMA) | 1 |
| Italian Albums (FIMI) | 5 |
| Japanese Albums (Oricon) | 7 |
| Mexican Albums (Top 100 Mexico) | 7 |
| New Zealand Albums (RMNZ) | 1 |
| Norwegian Albums (VG-lista) | 2 |
| Portuguese Albums (AFP) | 2 |
| South African Albums (RISA) | 1 |
| Spanish Albums (Promusicae) | 7 |
| Swedish Albums (Sverigetopplistan) | 1 |
| Swiss Albums (Schweizer Hitparade) | 1 |
| Taiwanese Albums (Five Music) | 17 |
| UK Albums (Official Charts) | 1 |
| US Billboard 200 | 2 |
| US Heatseekers Albums (Billboard) | 1 |
| US Top Catalog Albums (Billboard) | 32 |
| US Top Rock Albums (Billboard) | 1 |
| US Indie Store Album Sales (Billboard) | 5 |

=== Year-end charts ===
| Chart (2005) | Position |
|---|---|
| Australian Albums (ARIA) | 9 |
| Austrian Albums (Ö3 Austria) | 41 |
| Belgian Albums (Ultratop Flanders) | 30 |
| Belgian Alternative Albums (Ultratop Flanders) | 21 |
| Belgian Albums (Ultratop Wallonia) | 23 |
| Danish Albums (Hitlisten) | 8 |
| Dutch Albums (Album Top 100) | 17 |
| European Albums (Billboard) | 2 |
| Finnish Albums (Suomen virallinen lista) | 24 |
| French Albums (SNEP) | 10 |
| German Albums (Offizielle Top 100) | 21 |
| Irish Albums (IRMA) | 1 |
| Italian Albums (FIMI) | 40 |
| New Zealand Albums (RMNZ) | 1 |
| Spanish Albums (PROMUSICAE) | 48 |
| Swedish Albums (Sverigetopplistan) | 4 |
| Swedish Albums & Compilations (Sverigetopplistan) | 5 |
| Swiss Albums (Schweizer Hitparade) | 6 |
| UK Albums (OCC) | 1 |
| Worldwide Albums (IFPI) | 9 |

| Chart (2006) | Position |
|---|---|
| Australian Albums (ARIA) | 1 |
| Austrian Albums (Ö3 Austria) | 6 |
| Belgian Albums (Ultratop Flanders) | 6 |
| Belgian Alternative Albums (Ultratop Flanders) | 4 |
| Belgian Albums (Ultratop Wallonia) | 5 |
| Danish Albums (Hitlisten) | 33 |
| Dutch Albums (Album Top 100) | 13 |
| European Albums (Billboard) | 1 |
| French Albums (SNEP) | 11 |
| German Albums (Offizielle Top 100) | 5 |
| Greek Albums (IFPI) | 33 |
| Greek Foreign Albums (IFPI) | 5 |
| Irish Albums (IRMA) | 20 |
| Italian Albums (FIMI) | 77 |
| Japanese Albums (Oricon) | 40 |
| Mexican Albums (Top 100 Mexico) | 17 |
| New Zealand Albums (RMNZ) | 2 |
| South African Albums (RISA) | 1 |
| Swedish Albums (Sverigetopplistan) | 14 |
| Swedish Albums & Compilations (Sverigetopplistan) | 17 |
| Swiss Albums (Schweizer Hitparade) | 3 |
| UK Albums (OCC) | 22 |
| US Billboard 200 | 7 |
| US Tastemakers Albums (Billboard) | 10 |
| US Top Rock Albums (Billboard) | 2 |
| Worldwide Albums (IFPI) | 4 |

| Chart (2007) | Position |
|---|---|
| Australian Albums (ARIA) | 78 |
| Belgian Midprice Albums (Ultratop Flanders) | 14 |
| Belgian Midprice Albums (Ultratop Wallonia) | 2 |
| UK Albums (OCC) | 113 |
| US Billboard 200 | 189 |

| Chart (2008) | Position |
|---|---|
| Belgian Midprice Albums (Ultratop Wallonia) | 13 |

=== Decade-end charts ===
| Chart (2000–09) | Position |
|---|---|
| Australian Albums (ARIA) | 8 |
| UK Albums (OCC) | 1 |
| US Billboard 200 | 137 |

== Certifications and sales ==
| Region | Certification | Certified units/sales |
|---|---|---|
| Argentina (CAPIF) | 2× Platinum | 80,000^{^} |
| Australia (ARIA) | 9× Platinum | 670,000 |
| Austria (IFPI Austria) | 2× Platinum | 60,000^{*} |
| Belgium (BRMA) | 3× Platinum | 150,000^{*} |
| Brazil | — | 33,742 |
| Canada (Music Canada) | 6× Platinum | 600,000^{^} |
| Denmark (IFPI Danmark) | 6× Platinum | 120,000^{‡} |
| Finland (Musiikkituottajat) | Gold | 13,158 |
| France (SNEP) | Diamond | 750,000^{*} |
| Germany (BVMI) | 9× Gold | 900,000^{^} |
| Greece (IFPI Greece) | 2× Platinum | 80,000 |
| Iceland | — | 6,000 |
| Ireland (IRMA) | 14× Platinum | 210,000^{^} |
| Italy sales in 2005 | — | 100,000 |
| Italy (FIMI) sales since 2009 | Gold | 25,000^{‡} |
| Japan (RIAJ) | Platinum | 250,000^{^} |
| Mexico (AMPROFON) | Gold | 50,000^{^} |
| Netherlands (NVPI) | Platinum | 80,000^{^} |
| New Zealand (RMNZ) | 7× Platinum | 105,000^{^} |
| Portugal (AFP) | 2× Platinum | 40,000^{^} |
| South Africa (RISA) | Gold | 25,000^{*} |
| Spain (Promusicae) | Platinum | 100,000^{^} |
| Sweden (GLF) | 2× Platinum | 120,000^{^} |
| Switzerland (IFPI Switzerland) | 5× Platinum | 200,000^{^} |
| United Kingdom (BPI) | 11× Platinum | 3,505,359 |
| United States (RIAA) | 3× Platinum | 3,000,000^{‡} |
Summaries
| Europe (IFPI) | 6× Platinum | 6,000,000^{*} |
^{*} Sales figures based on certification alone.^{^} Shipments figures based on certification alone.^{‡} Sales+streaming figures based on certification alone.

== Use in media ==
Eight of the ten songs on Back to Bedlam were licensed for use in television shows, movies, advertising campaigns and trailers, a total of 34 times. This included "Tears and Rain", "So Long Jimmy" and "Cry", tracks that had not been released as singles.

== See also ==
- List of best-selling albums in the United Kingdom
- List of best-selling albums of the 2000s in Australia
- List of best-selling albums of the 2000s (decade) in the United Kingdom
- List of best-selling albums of the 2000s (century) in the United Kingdom
