= James Blunt discography =

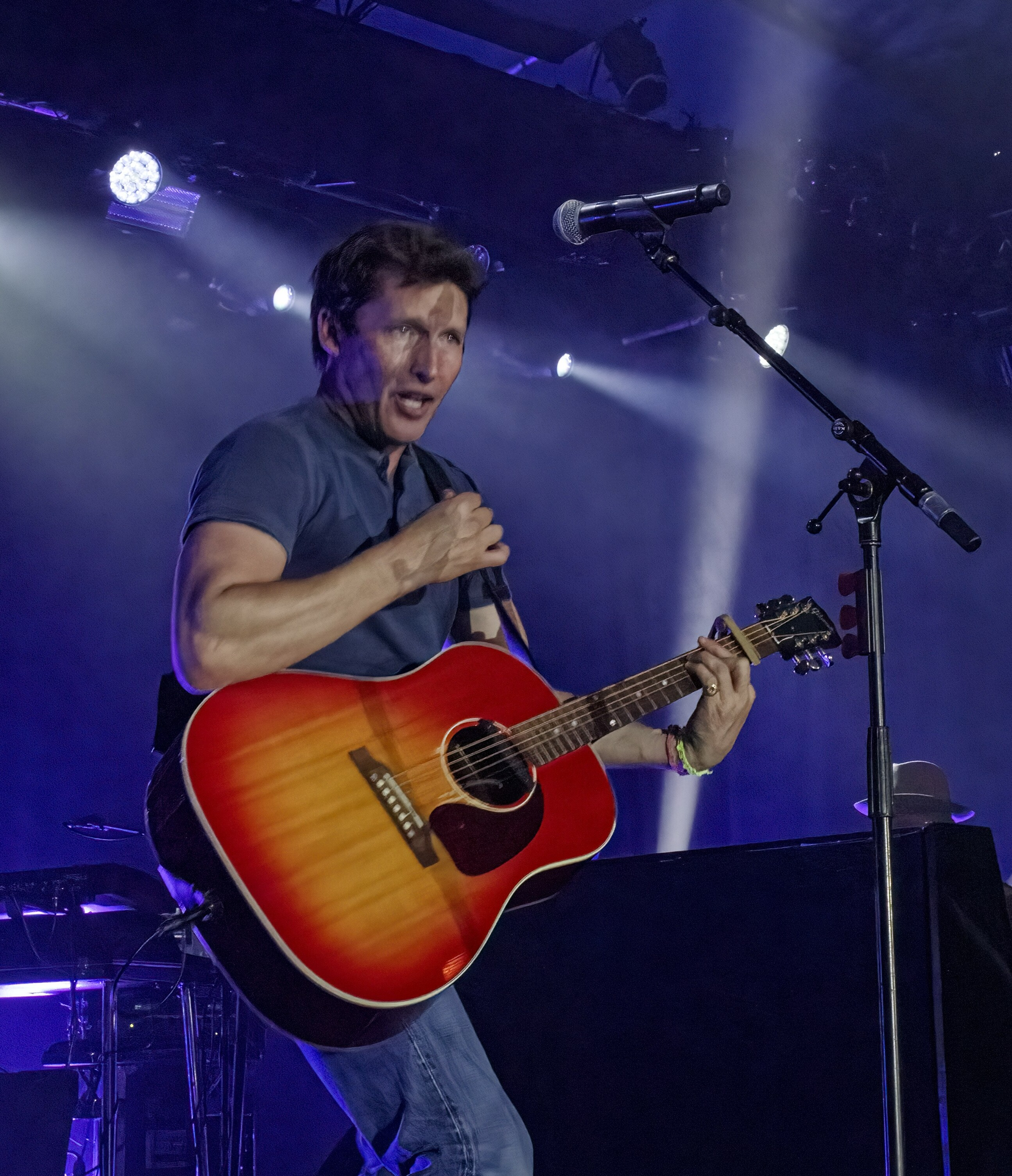
- James Blunt performing in 2022
- Studio albums: 8
- Extended plays: 11
- Live albums: 3
- Compilation albums: 1
- Singles: 35
- Music videos: 37

The discography of James Blunt, a British pop rock singer, contains eight studio albums, two live albums, one compilation album, eleven extended plays and thirty-five singles.

Blunt's debut album, Back to Bedlam, was released by Atlantic Records in the United Kingdom in October 2004 and peaked at number one on the UK Albums Chart in July 2005 and within the top five across most of Europe. It also peaked at number one on the Canadian Albums Chart and number two on the Billboard 200 in the United States. The album has sold over 11 million copies worldwide and has been certified 11× Platinum in the UK. Back to Bedlam produced the singles "High", "Wisemen" and "Goodbye My Lover". The most successful single released from the album, "You're Beautiful", went to number one on the UK Singles Chart, Irish Singles Chart, Dutch Top 40 and the Billboard Hot 100 in the United States. It also peaked at number two in Australia and Germany.

Chasing Time: The Bedlam Sessions, a live album and DVD package, was released in February 2006. Blunt's second studio album, All the Lost Souls, was released in September 2007 and contained the singles "1973", "Same Mistake", "Carry You Home", "I Really Want You" and "Love, Love, Love". The album was less successful than Back to Bedlam, but still managed to top the charts around the world. Blunt's third album, Some Kind of Trouble was released in November 2010 and debuted at number four in the UK. Blunt's fourth studio album Moon Landing, was released in October 2013. It debuted and peaked at number two in the UK. His fifth and sixth albums The Afterlove and Once Upon a Mind were released in 2017 and 2019 respectively.

His first compilation album The Stars Beneath My Feet (2004–2021) was released in 2021 and was certified Gold in the UK. Blunt's seventh studio album, Who We Used to Be, was released in October 2023. It was preceded by the singles: "Beside You", "All The Love That I Ever Wanted" and "The Girl That Never Was". Blunt's eighth studio album, Airplane Mode, was released in November 2026.

Blunt has sold more than 20 million records worldwide.

== Albums ==
=== Studio albums ===
List of albums, with selected chart positions and certifications
Title	Album details	Peak chart positions										Sales	Certifications
Title	Album details	UK	AUS	AUT	BEL	CAN	FRA	GER	IRL	SWI	US	Sales	Certifications
Back to Bedlam	Released: 11 October 2004; Label: Atlantic; Formats: LP, CD, digital download	1	1	1	1	1	2	1	1	1	2	UK: 3,505,359 (Note: Sales as of November 2026); AUS: 670,000 (Note: Sales as of January 2013)	BPI: 11× Platinum; ARIA: 9× Platinum; BRMA: 3× Platinum; BVMI: 9× Gold; IFPI AUT: 2× Platinum; IFPI SWI: 5× Platinum; IRMA: 14× Platinum; MC: 6× Platinum; RIAA: 3× Platinum; SNEP: Diamond
All the Lost Souls	Released: 17 September 2007; Label: Atlantic; Formats: LP, CD, digital download	1	1	1	1	1	1	1	1	1	7	UK: 974,259 (Note: Sales as of November 2026)	BPI: 3× Platinum; ARIA: Platinum; BRMA: Platinum; BVMI: 5× Gold; IFPI AUT: Platinum; IFPI SWI: 3× Platinum; IRMA: 3× Platinum; MC: 2× Platinum; RIAA: Gold; SNEP: Diamond
Some Kind of Trouble	Released: 8 November 2010; Label: Atlantic; Formats: CD, digital download	4	5	3	2	6	3	2	6	1	11	UK: 310,098 (Note: Sales as of March 2017)	BPI: Platinum; ARIA: Platinum; BRMA: Gold; BVMI: Platinum; IFPI AUT: Gold; IFPI SWI: Platinum; IRMA: Gold; MC: Gold; SNEP: 2× Platinum
Moon Landing	Released: 21 October 2013; Label: Atlantic; Formats: CD, digital download	2	2	1	5	2	5	2	5	1	20	UK: 448,248 (Note: Sales as of November 2026)	BPI: Platinum; ARIA: Platinum; BVMI: 3× Gold; IFPI AUT: Gold; IFPI SWI: Platinum; MC: Gold; SNEP: Platinum
The Afterlove	Release date: 24 March 2017; Label: Atlantic; Formats: CD, digital download	6	7	7	8	6	14	6	7	4	177		BPI: Gold
Once Upon a Mind	Released: 25 October 2019; Label: Atlantic; Formats: CD, digital download	3	5	6	15	40	26	8	38	4	— (Note: Once Upon a Mind did not enter the Billboard 200 chart, but peaked at number 71 on the Top Album Sales chart.)		BPI: Gold
Who We Used to Be	Released: 27 October 2023; Label: Atlantic; Formats: CD, digital download	5	61	5	21	—	29	11	—	4	—		
Airplane Mode	Released: 6 November 2026; Label: Atlantic; Formats: CD, digital download	1	9	5	15	—	—	9	27	4	—		

=== Live albums ===
Title	Album details	Peak chart positions			Certifications
Title	Album details	BEL	FRA	SWI	Certifications
Chasing Time: The Bedlam Sessions	Released: 21 February 2006; Labels: Atlantic; Formats: CD/DVD digital download	2	8	2	BPI: 2× Platinum; ARIA: 5× Platinum (DVD); BRMA: Gold; BVMI: Platinum; IFPI SWI: Gold; SNEP: Gold
Les Sessions Lost Souls	Released: 25 November 2008; Labels: Warner; Formats: CD/DVD digital download	—	39	—	
Trouble Revisited	Released: 5 December 2011; Labels: Atlantic; Formats: CD/DVD	—	87	47	
"—" denotes singles that did not chart or were not released.

=== Compilation albums ===
Title	Album details	Peak chart positions								Certifications
Title	Album details	UK	AUS	AUT	BEL	FRA	GER	IRL	SWI	Certifications
The Stars Beneath My Feet (2004–2021)	Released: 19 November 2021; Label: Atlantic; Formats: LP, CD, 2×CD, digital download, streaming	9	45	13	39	61	12	41	12	BPI: Platinum

=== Box sets ===
Title	Album details	Peak chart positions	Certifications	Notes
Title	Album details	AUS	Certifications	Notes
I'll Take Everything: The Platinum Collection	Released: 4 September 2015; Labels: Warner; Formats: 4×CD, digital download	5	ARIA: Gold	Collection of Blunt's first four studio albums (Back to Bedlam, All the Lost Souls, Some Kind of Trouble and Moon Landing)

== Extended plays ==
=== Physical EPs ===
Title	Details
Monkey on My Shoulder EP	Released: 2006; Labels: Atlantic; Formats: CD, digital download
Bonfire Heart EP	Released: 4 October 2013; Labels: Atlantic; Formats: CD, digital download

=== Digital EPs ===
Title	Details
James Blunt: Live from London	Released: 28 June 2005; Label: Atlantic
James Blunt: Up Close	Released: 25 October 2005; Label: Atlantic
James Blunt... Live in Berlin	Released: 28 October 2005; Label: Atlantic
Introducing... James Blunt	Released: 19 May 2008; Label: Atlantic
James Blunt Live: London Festival '08	Released: 17 July 2008; Label: Atlantic
Love, Love, Love	Released: 7 November 2008; Label: Atlantic
Amazon Artist Lounge Live EP	Released: 30 September 2013; Label: Atlantic
When I Find Love Again EP	Released: 31 October 2014; Label: Atlantic
Smoke Signals EP	Released: 15 December 2014 (US); Label: Custard, Atlantic

== Singles ==
=== As lead artist ===
List of singles, with selected chart positions and certifications, showing year released and album name
Title	Year	Peak chart positions										Certifications	Album
Title	Year	UK	AUS	AUT	BEL	CAN	FRA	GER	IRL	SWI	US	Certifications	Album
"High"	2004	16	42	13	—	—	—	22	18	15	100	BPI: Silver	Back to Bedlam
"You're Beautiful"	2005	1	2	6	3	1	5	2	1	2	1	BPI: 3× Platinum; ARIA: Platinum; BRMA: Gold; BVMI: Platinum; IFPI AUT: Gold; IFPI SWI: Gold; MC: 2× Platinum; RIAA: 4× Platinum	Back to Bedlam
"Goodbye My Lover"	2005	9	3	36	2	6	6	28	13	19	66	BPI: Platinum; ARIA: Platinum; BRMA: Gold; BVMI: Gold; IFPI SWI: Gold; RIAA: Gold	Back to Bedlam
"Wisemen"	2006	23	11	15	41	10	—	40	36	23	—	BPI: Gold	Back to Bedlam
"No Bravery"	2007	—	—	—	—	—	15	—	—	—	—		Back to Bedlam
"1973"	2007	4	11	1	1	13	—	2	5	1	73	BPI: Platinum; BRMA: Gold; BVMI: Gold; IFPI AUT: Gold	All the Lost Souls
"Same Mistake"	2007	57	—	12	43	69	—	27	—	21	—		All the Lost Souls
"Carry You Home"	2008	20	—	50	—	—	—	43	—	16	—	BPI: Silver	All the Lost Souls
"I Really Want You"	2008	171	—	—	—	75	—	—	—	—	—		All the Lost Souls
"Love, Love, Love"	2008	121	—	—	—	100	—	—	—	59	—		All the Lost Souls
"Stay the Night"	2010	26	10	6	4	53	31	4	28	1	94	BPI: Silver; ARIA: Platinum; BVMI: Gold	Some Kind of Trouble
"So Far Gone"	2011	—	—	40	52	—	82	—	—	—	—		Some Kind of Trouble
"If Time Is All I Have"	2011	—	53	—	—	—	—	—	—	—	—		Some Kind of Trouble
"I'll Be Your Man"	2011	—	—	45	60	—	—	40	—	64	—		Some Kind of Trouble
"Dangerous"	2011	—	—	—	—	—	—	—	—	—	—		Some Kind of Trouble
"Bonfire Heart"	2013	4	3	1	15	51	26	1	13	1	—	BPI: 2× Platinum; ARIA: 3× Platinum; BVMI: Platinum; IFPI AUT: Gold; IFPI SWI: Platinum; MC: Gold	Moon Landing
"Heart to Heart"	2014	42	26	10	58	—	—	17	—	37	—	ARIA: Gold; BVMI: Gold	Moon Landing
"Postcards"	2014	90	—	10	60	—	—	50	—	31	—		Moon Landing
"When I Find Love Again"	2014	78	27	44	55	—	—	78	—	59	—		Moon Landing
"Love Me Better"	2017	93	—	—	57	—	140	—	—	87	—		The Afterlove
"Bartender"	2017	— (Note: "Bartender" did not enter the UK Singles Chart Top 100 but peaked at number 35 on the UK Singles Downloads Chart on 31 March 2017.)	—	—	67	—	—	—	—	—	—		The Afterlove
"Cold"	2019	— (Note: "Cold" did not enter the UK Singles Chart Top 100 but peaked at number 18 on the UK Singles Downloads Chart on 18 October 2019.)	—	—	21	—	—	—	—	59	—		Once Upon a Mind
"Champions"	2019	—	—	—	—	—	—	—	—	65	—		Once Upon a Mind
"I Told You"	2019	—	—	—	—	—	—	—	—	—	—		Once Upon a Mind
"Monsters"	2019	90	—	—	—	—	—	—	71	—	— (Note: "Monsters" did not enter the Billboard Hot 100 chart, but peaked at number 3 on the Digital Song Sales chart.)	BPI: Gold	Once Upon a Mind
"The Truth"	2019	— (Note: "The Truth" did not enter the UK Singles Chart Top 100 but peaked at number 88 on the UK Singles Downloads Chart on 29 November 2019.)	—	—	—	—	—	—	—	55	—		Once Upon a Mind
"Halfway" (solo or featuring Ward Thomas)	2020	— (Note: "Halfway" did not enter the UK Singles Chart Top 100 but debuted and peaked at number 89 on the UK Singles Downloads Chart on 6 March 2020.)	—	—	—	—	—	—	—	—	—		Once Upon a Mind
"The Greatest"	2020	— (Note: "The Greatest" did not enter the UK Singles Chart Top 100 but peaked at number 25 on the UK Singles Downloads Chart on 24 April 2020.)	—	—	69	—	—	—	—	—	—		Once Upon a Mind
"Love Under Pressure"	2021	— (Note: "Love Under Pressure" did not enter the UK Singles Chart Top 100 but peaked at number 74 on the UK Singles Downloads Chart on 1 October 2021.)	—	—	—	—	—	—	—	—	—		The Stars Beneath My Feet (2004–2021)
"Unstoppable"	2021	— (Note: "Unstoppable" did not enter the UK Singles Chart Top 100 but peaked at number 84 on the UK Singles Downloads Chart on 26 November 2021.)	—	—	—	—	—	—	—	—	—		The Stars Beneath My Feet (2004–2021)
"Adrenaline"	2022	—	—	—	—	—	—	—	—	—	—		The Stars Beneath My Feet (2004–2021)
"Beside You"	2023	— (Note: "Beside You" did not enter the UK Top 100 but peaked at number 22 on the UK Singles Downloads Chart on 25 August 2023.)	—	—	—	—	—	—	—	—	—		Who We Used to Be
"All the Love That I Ever Needed"	2023	—	—	—	—	—	—	—	—	—	—		Who We Used to Be
"The Girl That Never Was"	2023	— (Note: "The Girl That Never Was" peaked at number 7 on the UK Singles Downloads Chart Top 100 on 3 November 2023.)	—	—	—	—	—	—	—	—	—		Who We Used to Be
"Tears Dry Tonight" (with Cyril)	2025	— (Note: "Tears Dry Tonight" did not enter the UK Singles Chart, but debuted at number 39 on the UK Singles Downloads Chart, and at number 40 on the UK Singles Sales Chart.)	—	—	—	—	—	—	—	—	—		Non-album single
"Tastes Like Summer"	2026	— (Note: "Tastes Like Summer" did not enter the UK Singles Chart, but debuted at number 10 on the UK Singles Downloads Chart, and at number 11 on the UK Singles Sales Chart.)	—	—	29	—	—	—	—	—	—		Airplane Mode
"Weight of It All"	2026	—	—	—	—	—	—	—	—	—	—		Airplane Mode
"Circles"	2026	— (Note: "Circles" did not enter the UK Singles Chart, but peaked at number 13 on the UK Singles Downloads Chart, and at number 9 on the UK Singles Sales Chart.)	—	—	—	—	—	—	—	—	—		Airplane Mode
"—" denotes singles that did not chart or were not released.

=== As featured artist ===
List of singles, with selected chart positions and certifications, showing year released and album name
Single	Year	Peak chart positions					Certifications	Album
Single	Year	AUT	BEL	FRA	GER	SWI	Certifications	Album
"Je réalise" (Sinik & James Blunt)	2008	—	11	3	—	38		Le toit du monde
"Primavera in Anticipo (It Is My Song)" (Laura Pausini & James Blunt)	2009	1	23	—	16	5	IFPI AUT: Gold; IFPI SWI: Gold	Primavera in anticipo
"OK" (Robin Schulz featuring James Blunt)	2017	2	17	21	2	2	BRMA: Platinum; BVMI: 2× Platinum; IFPI AUT: 2× Platinum; IFPI SWI: 2× Platinum; SNEP: Platinum	Uncovered
"Bridge over Troubled Water" (as part of Artists for Grenfell)	2017	32	—	—	—	28	BPI: Gold	Non-album single
"Melody" (Lost Frequencies featuring James Blunt)	2018	19	2	—	26	8	BRMA: Platinum; BVMI: Gold	Alive and Feeling Fine
"Walk Away" (Alle Farben featuring James Blunt)	2019	—	—	—	98	—		Sticker on My Suitcase
"Can't Forget You" (James Carter and Ofenbach featuring James Blunt)	2023	—	—	—	—	—		Non-album single
"—" denotes singles that did not chart or were not released.

== Other charted songs ==
List of songs, with selected chart positions, showing year released and album name
Single	Year	Chart				Album
Single	Year	AUS	BEL	FRA	SWI	Album
"Face the Sun"	2013	—	—	133	—	Moon Landing
"The Only One"	2013	—	—	—	49	Moon Landing
"Don't Give Me Those Eyes"	2017	67	86	—	27	The Afterlove
"—" denotes singles that did not chart or were not released.

== Music videos ==
Year	Song	Director(s)
2004	"High"	Mark Davis
2005	"Wisemen"	Mark Davis
2005	"You're Beautiful"	Sam Brown
2005	"High" (2005 video)	Sam Brown
2005	"Goodbye My Lover"	Sam Brown
2006	"Wisemen" (2006 video)	Paul Minor
2006	"No Bravery"	Paul Heyes
2007	"1973"	Paul R. Brown
2007	"Same Mistake"	Jonas Åkerlund
2008	"Carry You Home"	Jake Nava
2008	"Je réalise" (Sinik featuring James Blunt)	Thomas Peké
2008	"I Really Want You"	Jim Canty
2008	"Love, Love, Love"	Kinga Burza
2009	"Primavera in Anticipo" (It Is My Song) (Laura Pausini featuring James Blunt)	Gaetano Morbioli
2010	"Stay the Night"	Ray Kay
2011	"So Far Gone"	Marc Klasfeld
2011	"If Time Is All I Have"	Robert Hales
2011	"I'll Be Your Man"	Giorgio Testi
2011	"Dangerous"	Luc Janin
2013	"Bonfire Heart"	Vaughan Arnell
2013	"Satellites"	Official Lyric Video
2013	"Heart to Heart"	Vaughan Arnell
2014	"Postcards"	Vaughan Arnell
2014	"When I Find Love Again"	Vaughan Arnell
2017	"Love Me Better"	Vaughan Arnell
2017	"Time of Our Lives"	
2017	"Bartender"	Declan Whitebloom
2017	"Don't Give Me Those Eyes" video 1	Andrew Flakelar
2017	"Don't Give Me Those Eyes" video 2	Travis Kopach
2017	"OK" (Robin Schulz featuring James Blunt)	Liza Minou Morberg
2017	"Someone Singing Along"	Suzie Selman
2019	"Monsters"	Vaughan Arnell
2019	"The Truth"	Vaughan Arnell
2021	"Unstoppable"	Jamie Thraves
2022	"Adrenaline"	Moon
2023	"Beside You"	Craig Bingham
2023	"The Girl That Never Was"	Vaughan Arnell

== Other appearances ==
These songs have appeared on a studio album not released by Blunt.

Year	Song	Album
2005	"I Want You"	Listen to Bob Dylan: A Tribute
2006	"If There's Any Justice"	Radio 1's Live Lounge
2011	"Why Do I Fall"	Titeuf Original Soundtrack
2014	"I Guess That's Why They Call It the Blues"	BBC Radio 2: Sounds of the 80s
2020	"OK" (with Helene Fischer)	Die Helene Fischer Show – Meine schönsten Momente, Vol. 1
