= The Stars Beneath My Feet (2004–2021) =

Compilation album by James Blunt
- Released: 19 November 2021
- Length: 114:13
- Label: Atlantic

James Blunt chronology
Once Upon a Mind (2019)	The Stars Beneath My Feet (2004–2021) (2021)	Who We Used to Be (2023)

Singles from The Stars Beneath My Feet (2004–2021)
- 1. "Love Under Pressure" Released: 10 September 2021; 2. "Unstoppable" Released: 29 October 2021; 3. "Adrenaline" Released: 18 March 2022

The Stars Beneath My Feet (2004–2021) is the first compilation album by English singer James Blunt, released on 19 November 2021 through Atlantic Records. It produced three singles, "Love Under Pressure", "Unstoppable" and "Adrenaline", the latter of which featured Chinese pop singer Jason Zhang. The album was certified Gold in the UK.

Blunt's first compilation album features his biggest songs, including: "You're Beautiful", "Goodbye My Lover", "1973", "Stay the Night", "Bonfire Heart" and "Monsters".

== Commercial performance ==
The Stars Beneath My Feet (2004–2021) peaked at number 9 on the UK Albums Chart and charted for 15 weeks.

== Promotion ==
A greatest hits tour followed, with UK dates in February 2022.

== Track listing ==
The Stars Beneath My Feet (2004–2021) track listing
No.	Title	From album	Length
1.	"Love Under Pressure"	Previously unreleased	2:45
2.	"1973"	All the Lost Souls (2007)	4:39
3.	"Wisemen"	Back to Bedlam (2004)	3:43
4.	"Same Mistake"	All the Lost Souls (2007)	4:58
5.	"You're Beautiful"	Back to Bedlam (2004)	3:33
6.	"Monsters"	Once Upon a Mind (2019)	4:20
7.	"Tears and Rain"	Back to Bedlam (2004)	4:04
8.	"Bonfire Heart"	Moon Landing (2013)	3:56
9.	"I Really Want You" (Live in New York)	Exclusive Live Performance	3:35
10.	"The Truth"	Once Upon a Mind (2019)	3:42
11.	"Heart to Heart"	Moon Landing (2013)	3:26
12.	"Champions"	Once Upon a Mind (2019)	3:13
13.	"Postcards"	Moon Landing (2013)	4:44
14.	"No Bravery" (Live in London)	Exclusive Live Performance	3:48
15.	"Adrenaline"	Previously unreleased	2:56
16.	"Smoke Signals"	Moon Landing: Apollo Edition (2013)	3:42
17.	"Unstoppable"	Previously unreleased	3:27
18.	"Goodbye My Lover"	Back to Bedlam (2004)	4:17
19.	"Coz I Love You" (Live at Glastonbury)	All the Lost Souls (Deluxe) (2008)	5:34
20.	"So Long, Jimmy"	Back to Bedlam (2004)	4:25
21.	"Carry You Home"	All the Lost Souls (2007)	3:54
22.	"The Greatest"	Once Upon a Mind (2019)	3:11
23.	"High"	Back to Bedlam (2004)	4:03
24.	"Don't Give Me Those Eyes"	The Afterlove (2017)	4:04
25.	"OK" (with Robin Schulz)	The Afterlove (2017) / Uncovered (2017)	3:10
26.	"Stay the Night"	Some Kind of Trouble (2010)	3:32
27.	"Bartender"	The Afterlove (2017)	3:13
28.	"Cold"	Once Upon a Mind (2019)	3:29
29.	"Where Is My Mind?" (Live in Paris)	Exclusive Live Performance	3:48
30.	"I Came for Love"	Previously unreleased	3:02
Total length:			114:13

== Charts ==
Chart performance for The Stars Beneath My Feet (2004–2021)
Chart (2021)	Peak position
Australian Albums (ARIA)	45
Austrian Albums (Ö3 Austria)	13
Belgian Albums (Ultratop Flanders)	38
Belgian Albums (Ultratop Wallonia)	39
French Albums (SNEP)	61
German Albums (Offizielle Top 100)	12
Irish Albums (Official Charts)	41
Scottish Albums (Official Charts)	10
Swiss Albums (Schweizer Hitparade)	12
UK Albums (Official Charts)	9

== Certifications ==
Certifications for The Stars Beneath My Feet (2004–2021)
Region	Certification	Certified units/sales
United Kingdom (BPI)	Platinum	300,000^{‡}
^{‡} Sales+streaming figures based on certification alone.
