= Je réalise =

Single by Sinik featuring James Blunt

from the album Le Toit Du Monde and All The Lost Souls: Deluxe Edition
- B-side: "Daryl"
- Released: 28 February 2008
- Recorded: 2007; Studio Warner, Paris
- Genre: Pop
- Length: 3:28
- Label: Up Music, Warner Music France
- Songwriter(s): Sinik, James Blunt, Eg White
- Producer(s): Tefa & Masta, Sinik, Six-O-Nine

Sinik featuring James Blunt singles chronology
"Carry You Home" (2008)	"Je réalise" (2008)	"I Really Want You" (2008)

"Je réalise" is a pop duet between French singer Sinik and British singer-songwriter James Blunt. It was released as the second single from Sinik's album Le Toit Du Monde. The single was released on 28 February 2008. The song was also featured on the deluxe version of Blunt's second studio album, All the Lost Souls. The single was very successful in Europe, however, was not released in the UK or Ireland. The single was released simultaneously digitally and physically. The song contains an interpolation of Blunt's "I'll Take Everything" as the chorus.

== Release ==
The single was released on one digital and physical format, both containing the same track listing. The song was backed with a brand new song written exclusively for the French market, entitled "Daryl".

== Music video ==
A music video was released in many European territories. The video features Blunt and Sinik together in a recording studio. Scenes showing Sinik and Blunt recording are intertwined with images of a girl in a forest who seems lost. As the video progresses, the girl seems to become more and more distressed, until she loses her footing and falls into a lake. Her mother comes later to find her, but it seems she has drowned. The video was included on the deluxe edition bonus DVD of Blunt's All the Lost Souls.

== Track listing ==
1. "Je Realise" (Sinik feat. James Blunt) – 3:28
2. "Daryl" (Sinik) – 3:41

== Charts ==
Chart (2008)	Peak position
French Singles Chart	16
Swiss Singles Chart	38
