= Les Sessions Lost Souls =

Live album by James Blunt
- Released: 25 November 2008
- Recorded: 2007–2008
- Genre: Soft rock, pop, rock
- Length: 38:04 (CD), 76:11 (DVD)
- Label: WEA International
- Producer: Alison Howe

James Blunt chronology
All the Lost Souls (2007)	Les Sessions Lost Souls (2008)	Some Kind of Trouble (2010)

Les Sessions Lost Souls is a live album and DVD released by James Blunt in 2008 as a follow-up to his 2007 album, All the Lost Souls. The set contains a live album containing recordings from Blunt live in Belgium, Sydney and England, as well as a DVD featuring recorded performances at the Max Sessions in Sydney, Paris and Ibiza, music videos for "1973", "Same Mistake", "Carry You Home" and "I Really Want You", and the previously unreleased documentary, "Return To Kosovo". The DVD and four songs were included as part of a deluxe package of All the Lost Souls that was available in the United Kingdom, thus meaning that this release was not issued there. The digital version of the album features the additional EP James Blunt - Live in London.

== Track listing ==
Disc One - CD

1. "1973" (Live in Belgium)
2. "Same Mistake" (Live in Belgium)
3. "I'll Take Everything" (Live in Belgium)
4. "Carry You Home" (Live in Belgium)
5. "Give Me Some Love" (Live in Belgium)
6. "I Really Want You" (Live in Sydney, The Max Sessions)
7. "Cuz I Love You" (Live in England, Glastonbury 2008)
8. "Young Folks" (Live in England, Jo Whiley Live Lounge)
9. "Breakfast in America" (Live in England, Hammersmith Apollo)
10. "Primavera in Anticipo (It Is My Song)" (Feat. Laura Pausini)
11. "Je Realise" (Feat. Sinik)
12. "Love, Love, Love"

Digital download additional EP

1. "Give Me Some Love" (Live in London)
2. "Carry You Home" (Live in London)
3. "I'll Take Everything" (Live in London)
4. "I Really Want You" (Live in London)
5. "One of the Brightest Stars" (Live in London)
6. "Same Mistake" (Live in London)

Disc 2 - DVD

1. "Same Mistake" (Live at Abbey Road)
2. "I'll Take Everything" (Live at Abbey Road)
3. "1973" (Live at Abbey Road)
4. "You're Beautiful" (Live in Paris)
5. "Goodbye My Lover" (Live in Paris)
6. "Carry You Home" (Live on the Max Sessions, Sydney)
7. "Wisemen" (Live in Ibiza)
8. "One of the Brightest Stars" (Live in Ibiza)
9. "1973" (Video)
10. "Same Mistake" (Video)
11. "Carry You Home" (Video)
12. "I Really Want You" (Video)
13. "Je Realise" (Video)
14. "Return To Kosovo - Documentary"
15. "James Blunt TV5M Special"
16. "1973" (Making of The Video)
17. "Same Mistake" (Making of The Video)
18. "Carry You Home" (Making of The Video)
19. "I Really Want You" (Making of The Video)

== Personnel ==
- Paul Beard – Keyboards, Vocals
- James Blunt – Guitar (Acoustic), Keyboards, Vocals
- Karl Brazil – Drums
- Mark Jonathan Davis – Director
- Valerie Etienne – Vocals
- Dan Fitzgerald – Engineer
- Paul Fredericks – Vocals
- Joe Garland – Vocals
- Mary Gormley – A&R
- Robert Hayden – Management
- Phil Heyes – Director
- Alison Howe – Producer
- Todd Interland – Management
- Mary Ellen Matthews – Cover Photo
- Malcolm Moore – Bass, Vocals
- Brian Murray – Guitar Technician
- Conor O'Mahony – A&R
- Tim Summerhayes – Mixing
- Dennie Vidal – Engineer

== Charts ==
Chart (2008–09)	Peak position
French Albums (SNEP)	39
