= Who We Used to Be =

Studio album by James Blunt
- Released: 27 October 2023
- Length: 31:01
- Label: Atlantic
- Producers: Jonny Coffer; Jack & Coke; Red Triangle; Steve Robson

James Blunt chronology
The Stars Beneath My Feet (2004–2021) (2021)	Who We Used to Be (2023)	Airplane Mode (2026)

Singles from Who We Used to Be
- 1. "Beside You" Released: 2 August 2023; 2. "All the Love That I Ever Needed" Released: 22 September 2023; 3. "The Girl That Never Was" Released: 4 October 2023

Who We Used to Be is the seventh studio album by English singer James Blunt, released on 27 October 2023 through Atlantic Records. It was preceded by the release of three singles, including the lead, "Beside You", and "The Girl That Never Was". It was released alongside Blunt's quasi-memoir Loosely Based on a Made-Up Story. The deluxe version added four bonus songs.

== Background ==
On 2 August 2023, Blunt announced the release date for Who We Used to Be, his first studio album since 2019's Once Upon a Mind.

Blunt wrote the song "Dark Thought" about visiting his friend Carrie Fisher's house after she had died in 2016. The two met in England in 2003, and Blunt lived in Fisher's house in Los Angeles after he moved there to record Back to Bedlam (2004). Fisher had previously spoken about how she "became James's therapist".

== Singles ==
On 2 August 2023, Blunt released the single "Beside You". The official music video was released on 10 August 2023. The single peaked at number 22 on the UK Singles Downloads Chart on 25 August 2023.

The album's second single, "All the Love That I Ever Needed" was released on 22 September 2023.

"The Girl That Never Was" was released as the album's third official single on 4 October 2023. The official music video, released on 12 October 2023, was directed by Blunt's former collaborator Vaughan Arnell. On 27 October 2023, Blunt performed the song on the BBC's The One Show. On writing the song, Blunt stated: "I'm married. We had aspirations to start a family and...people in my situation have gone through that, you win some battles and you lose some. And the ones that we have lost we struggle with a bit." The single peaked at number 7 on the UK Singles Downloads Chart on 3 November 2023.

== Critical reception ==
Professional ratings
Review scores
Source	Rating
Clash	7/10
Financial Times	3/5 stars
I	4/5 stars
Retropop	4/5 stars
The Times	2/5 stars

Ludovic Hunter-Tilney of the Financial Times wrote that Blunt's "new songs slot neatly into the usual groove. They're efficiently assembled and easy on the ear. There are heartfelt clichés about life being like a carousel and tunes that press emotional buttons with military precision, all surging major chords and downcast minor ones". Retropop commented that the tracks are "not all upbeat [...] and as Blunt declares his zest for life, he also navigates the challenges before him; aging, loss and the passing of time all play into the narrative that forms a complex picture of the performer, at the height of success, as he enters a new decade". The publication concluded that "there's no question it's one of his most confident offerings and, in terms of the songs themselves, his best in a long time". Mike Milenko, reviewing for Clash, opined that the album is "one of Blunt's best albums to date and serves as a tantalising glimpse into the singer/songwriter's growth and maturity as an artist". Pip Ellwood-Hughes, writing for Entertainment Focus, felt Blunt was the "freest" he had ever sounded, adding that he had "crafted a solid pop album".

== Commercial performance ==
On 30 October 2023 the UK's Official Charts Company revealed that Who We Used to Be was at number five on the midweek chart, which it debuted at on the final chart. The album stayed on that chart for two weeks; on the UK Album Sales Chart, Who We Used to Be charted for fifteen weeks.

== Track listing ==
Who We Used to Be track listing
No.	Title	Writer(s)	Producer(s)	Length
1.	"Saving a Life"	James Blunt; Amy Wadge; Jakob Hazell; Svante Halldin	Jack & Coke	2:55
2.	"Some Kind of Beautiful"	Blunt; Jonny Coffer; Mike Needle	Coffer; Needle; Matt James^{[a]}	2:58
3.	"Beside You"	Blunt; Richard Boardman; James Essien; Ennio Morricone; David Strääf	The Six	3:05
4.	"Last Dance"	Blunt; Nick Atkinson; Steve Robson	Coffer; Robson	2:48
5.	"All the Love That I Ever Needed"	Blunt; Nick Hahn	Mark Crew; Hahn; Dan Priddy	3:17
6.	"The Girl That Never Was"	Blunt; Rick Parkhouse; George Tizzard	Red Triangle	3:13
7.	"Cold Shoulder"	Blunt; Parkhouse; Tizzard	Red Triangle	3:08
8.	"I Won't Die with You"	Blunt; Parkhouse; Tizzard	Red Triangle	3:04
9.	"Dark Thought"	Blunt; Parkhouse; Tizzard	Red Triangle	3:43
10.	"Glow"	Blunt; Boardman; Needle	The Six	2:50
Total length:				31:01

Deluxe edition tracks
No.	Title	Writer(s)	Producer(s)	Length
11.	"Confetti and Roses"	Blunt; Robson; Dewain Whitmore Jr.	Robson	3:43
12.	"Care a Little Less"	Blunt; Sunny Berhane; Hunter Hill	Jimmy Hogarth	2:45
13.	"A Thousand Lives"	Blunt; Boardman; Hill; Needle; Sean Poole	The Six	3:10
14.	"When You're Gone"	Blunt; Berhane; Nick Bradley; Coffer; Needle	Coffer; Loose Change; Needle	3:02
15.	"Tears Dry Tonight (with CYRIL)"	Blunt; CYRIL; Paul Harris; Toby Scott	CYRIL; Harris; Scott	3:20
Total length:				43:41

Note

- ^{^[a]} signifies an additional producer.

== Personnel ==
Musicians

- James Blunt – vocals (all tracks), backing vocals (track 1)
- Jakob Hazell – backing vocals, bass, drums, guitar, keyboards, percussion (1)
- Svante Haldin – backing vocals, bass, drums, guitar, keyboards, percussion (1)
- Jonny Coffer – bass, drums, guitar, keyboards, piano, programming (2, 4, 14)
- Martin Hannah – additional programming (2, 4, 14), guitar (2, 14)
- Mike Needle – backing vocals (2)
- James Essien – backing vocals (3)
- Rick Boardman – keyboards (3, 10, 13); bass, drums, guitar, programming, synthesizer (3); piano (10, 13)
- David Strääf – drums, guitar, programming, synthesizer (3)
- Steve Robson – keyboards (4, 11), bass (4); programming, string arrangement (11)
- John Garrison – bass (5, 6)
- Nick Hahn – acoustic guitar, keyboards (5)
- Karl Brazil – drums (5)
- Luke Potashnick – guitar (5)
- Paul Sayer – guitar (5)
- Chris Pemberton –piano (5)
- Mark Crew – programming, synthesizer (5)
- George Tizzard – acoustic guitar, backing vocals, drums, piano (6–9)
- Rick Parkhouse – backing vocals, electric guitar, programming, synthesizer (6–9)
- Peteris Sokolovskis – cello (3, 9)
- Dino Medanhodzic – backing vocals, bass, drums, guitar, programming, strings (10, 13)
- George Lindsay – drums (11)
- Jo Hill – backing vocals (12)
- Samuel Dixon – bass (12)
- Dan McDougall – drums (12)
- Jimmy Hogarth – guitar (12)
- Martin Slattery – keyboards (12)

Technical

- Stuart Hawkes – mastering
- Dan Grech-Marguerat – mixing (1–5, 7–9, 11–14)
- Red Triangle – mixing (6)
- Dino Medanhodzic – mixing (10)
- Jakob Hazell – engineering (1)
- Svante Haldin – engineering (1)
- Martin Hannah – engineering (2, 4, 14)
- Steve Robson – engineering (11)
- Jimmy Hogarth – engineering (12)
- Louis Henry Sarmiento – additional engineering (11)
- Luke Glazewski – additional engineering (12)

== Charts ==
Chart performance for Who We Used to Be
Chart (2023)	Peak position
Australian Albums (ARIA)	61
Austrian Albums (Ö3 Austria)	5
Belgian Albums (Ultratop Flanders)	24
Belgian Albums (Ultratop Wallonia)	21
Dutch Albums (Album Top 100)	15
French Albums (SNEP)	29
German Albums (Offizielle Top 100)	11
Hungarian Albums (MAHASZ)	20
Italian Albums (FIMI)	97
New Zealand Albums (RMNZ)	40
Scottish Albums (Official Charts)	6
Swiss Albums (Schweizer Hitparade)	4
UK Albums (Official Charts)	5
