= Stop the Clock =

Stop the Clock may refer to:

== Television ==
- "Stop the Clock!", a 1987 episode of The Raccoons

== Songs ==
- "Stop the Clock", a song by James Blunt from the 2019 album Once Upon a Mind
- "Stop the Clock", a song by Lisa Lougheed from the 1987 album Evergreen Nights
