= Chestcam =

Type of body-mounted camera

A SnorriCam (also chestcam, body mount/bodymount, or bodycam) is a camera device used in filmmaking that is rigged to the body of the actor, with the camera facing the actor directly so that they appear in a fixed position in the center of the frame. A SnorriCam presents a dynamic, disorienting point of view from the actor's perspective, providing an unusual sense of vertigo for the viewer.

The type of shot that this device is used for can be considered opposite to the more common fixed first-person perspective shot.

== History ==
The SnorriCam is named after two Iceland Icelandic photographers and directors, Einar Snorri and Eiður Snorri Eysteinsson, who worked together under the name Snorri Bros (but are not otherwise related).

The idea of what was later coined the "SnorriCam" has been around for decades, in mostly ad hoc implementations. The earliest use of a body-mounted camera rig is considered to be the 1932 film Kuhle Wampe, in which the camera tracks a woman walking through a crowd of children. The practicality of such a point-of-view device was limited by the weight of the camera. Since most 35mm motion picture cameras were too heavy to carry easily, their development was not practical. However, with the emergence of the Steadicam and the manufacture of small, lightweight cameras that could fit on the Steadicam platform, an added bonus of these newer, lighter cameras was the possibility of a point-of-view device such as the SnorriCam.

In 1996, Einar Snorri and Eiður Snorri built a camera rig for a low-budget music video for the punk band Maul Girls' song "Chunky Black Shoes". A friend of theirs was on set and recognized the potential for this rig to be used in a film that he was producing, π (1998). The friend asked if he could borrow the rig to show to the director of the film, Darren Aronofsky, who evidently used the device in his film.

The Bodymount, another brand of SnorriCam, was also developed in 1996 by cinematographer Gary Thieltges through his company, Doggicam Systems. In 2004, The Society of Camera Operators recognized The Bodymount's contribution to the film industry with their Technical Achievement Award.

== Uses in film ==
The earliest use of a body-mounted camera rig is considered to be the 1932 Nazi-banned Kuhle Wampe, in which the camera tracks a woman walking through a crowd of children. In Jean Renoir’s A Day in the Country (1946) a decade later, a camera is mounted to a swing and watches Sylvia Bataille's character rocking back and forth; Satyajit Ray employed the same technique in Charulata (1964), where the camera is mounted on a swing and watches Madhabi Mukherjee's character. In the 1966 film Seconds by John Frankenheimer, a SnorriCam prototype is attached to actors Frank Campanella, Rock Hudson, and John Randolph at various angles.

In Mean Streets (1973), a SnorriCam shot follows the lead character (played by Harvey Keitel) as he moves through a crowded bar and passes out drunk in the back. In Truck Turner (1974), the character played by Yaphet Kotto can be seen in his final throes of death through the eyes of a SnorriCam.

In White of the Eye (1987), a pre-Snorricam bodycam is worn by Paul (played by David Keith during the climactic chase scene, as he wildly pursues Joan (played by Cathy Moriarty) through the quarry.

The films π (1998) and Requiem for a Dream (2000), both directed by Darren Aronofsky, use the SnorriCam extensively and are considered to have popularized the technique.

Armageddon (1998) uses a virtual SnorriCam to depict an astronaut being hit by a burst of gas and flying off into space. In 28 Weeks Later (2007), a zombie is filmed through a SnorriCam while chasing Robert Carlyle's character. In The Hangover (2009), the character Stuart (played by Ed Helms) has a SnorriCam attached as he wakes up disoriented and hungover. The Bollywood film Dev D (2009) uses SnorriCam sequence to depict point of view of the lead character in a drunken state where nothing makes sense in the background. The rig is also notably used in Guy Ritchie’s Lock, Stock and Two Smoking Barrels (1999), Alejandro González Iñárritu’s Babel (2006), Marc Webb's The Amazing Spider-Man (2012), Richard Shepard's The Perfection (2018), Matt Reeves' The Batman (2022), and Kenneth Branagh's A Haunting in Venice (2023).

== Uses in television ==
- The "Sir Digby Chicken-Caesar" sketches in That Mitchell and Webb Look use a SnorriCam extensively.
- In Torchwood, the episode "Dead Man Walking" (Season 2 Episode 7) also has a sequence where the character Owen Harper is seen moving through a nightclub in a SnorriCam sequence with a slight speed up.
- The first episode of the second series of Skins features a SnorriCam being used in a party scene.
- The British television show Misfits also uses a SnorriCam during a party scene with several of the characters.
- The show Scrubs uses Bodymount shots in a few episodes to depict nervousness.
- In the Discovery Channel show Survivorman, Les Stroud will often employ this technique when walking, due to the limitations of not having a film crew.
- The Bodymount has also been used in episodes of the hit television series Lost.
- Season 1 of Dexter also features a Bodymount shot at the start of episode 11 used on the main character, Dexter Morgan.
- Episode 10 ("Imperfect Harmony") of Selfie's sole season used a SnorriCam to highlight a major character's experience at a party.
- The technique is also featured in the seventh season of Supernatural.
- Last episode of first season of the British show Shameless features the Bodymount being used in the opening scene.
- A doggicam was used in Clarice.

== Uses in music videos ==
One of the earliest uses of a SnorriCam in music videos was in the Smashing Pumpkins video "1979" directed by Jonathan Dayton and Valerie Faris in 1995.

Other notable uses of the SnorriCam include:

- Blur's video for Bang (1991)
- Spike Jonze's 1998 "Home" video for Sean Lennon
- Janet Jackson's "Go Deep" in 1998
- Tricky's 1995 video for "Hell Is Round the Corner"
- The Marcos Siega-directed System of a Down video for "Chop Suey!" (2001)
- Mick Jagger and Lenny Kravitz's "God Gave Me Everything" (2001) video by Mark Romanek entirely uses The Bodymount
- The Darkness's video for Get Your Hands Off My Woman (2003)
- Siobhán Donaghy's "Overrated" (2003) video by Big TV!
- The award-winning video for Adam Freeland's "We Want Your Soul" (2003)
- Green Day's "Jesus of Suburbia" (2005) video by Samuel Bayer
- Placebo's "Meds" (2006) video by David Mould
- James Blunt's "Same Mistake" (2007) directed by Jonas Åkerlund
- Tove Lo's "Habits" (2013) video directed by Motellet.
- Crobot's "Nowhere to Hide" (2014)

Adam Buxton/Garth Jennings's video to Radiohead's "Jigsaw Falling into Place" (2008) uses head cams in order to achieve the same effect that the SnorriCam provides. Branden Bratuhin and Marcus Matyas' video for Danielle Duval, "Imposter" (2011) utilized a compact digital camera to record her singing her song across various locations in Toronto. The music video for "All We Know" by the Chainsmokers and Phoebe Ryan also features SnorriCam footage from both front and back of the actor. The SnorriCam is also used extensively in the music video for “Smooth Sailing” by Queens of the Stone Age, featuring the SnorriCam being used both behind the actor's head as well as in front of their face.
