= Monkey on My Shoulder =

Monkey on My Shoulder EP

EP by James Blunt
- Released: 4 June 2006
- Recorded: 2004–2006
- Genre: Folk rock, pop rock
- Length: 16:15
- Label: Custard, Atlantic

James Blunt chronology
Back to Bedlam (2005)	Monkey on My Shoulder EP (2006)	All the Lost Souls (2007)

The Monkey on My Shoulder EP is a collection of demo songs written by British singer-songwriter James Blunt. The EP was released on 4 June 2006, by Custard Records and Atlantic Records, exclusively through Target Stores in the US. The EP was also made available to download via iTunes. The EP features five demo recordings of songs which would later appear on Blunt's debut studio album, Back to Bedlam, or as B-sides to singles from that album. The EP contained a booklet which documents the changes from the original demo recordings, found here, to the finalised recordings. The EP was limited to certain numbers and was not available anywhere in the UK.

== Promotion ==
Following copies of the EP becoming rare and unavailable, Target Stores offered a new, deluxe version of Back to Bedlam, containing an additional two acoustic tracks on Disc 1, and the EP as an exclusive bonus disc. This version of Back to Bedlam was sold exclusively in America.

== Track listing ==
1. "Cry" (Demo) – 2:57 (James Blunt; Sacha Skarbek)
2. "High" (Demo) – 3:43 (J. Blunt; Ricky Ross)
3. "Sugar Coated" (Demo) – 3:50 (J. Blunt; S. Skarbek; Jimmy Hogarth)
4. "Goodbye My Lover" (Demo) – 3:58 (J. Blunt; S. Skarbek)
5. "Butterfly" (Demo) – 2:03 (J. Blunt)
