= Love, Love, Love (James Blunt song) =

Single by James Blunt

from the album All the Lost Souls
- B-side: "I'll Take Everything" (Demo); "1973" (Live from The MAX Sessions)
- Released: 7 November 2008
- Recorded: 2008
- Genre: Pop rock
- Length: 3:46
- Label: Atlantic
- Songwriters: James Blunt, Eg White
- Producers: Eg White, Tom Rothrock

James Blunt singles chronology
"I Really Want You" (2008)	"Love, Love, Love" (2008)	"Same Mistake" (2016)

"Love, Love, Love" is the fourth single from James Blunt's second studio album, All the Lost Souls. It is also his ninth single overall. It is the only song from the deluxe version of the album to be released as a single. It is also the first single released by Blunt to feature John Garrison, who replaced Malcolm Moore at the end of 2007, as one of the band members to perform on the track. The single was released on 7 November 2008, with a physical release appearing three days later. The song peaked at No. 121 on the UK Singles Chart, making it Blunt's lowest charting single to date.

== Release ==
The single was released on one physical and download format, each containing the same track listing. The single features a demo version of album track "I'll Take Everything", which was recorded at its first conception during the writing sessions. The track was written by Blunt and Eg White. The single also features a live version of "1973" recorded live at The MAX Sessions in Sydney.

== Music video ==
Directed by Kinga Burza, the music video shows Blunt playing guitar and singing along to the song, whilst surrounded by 1970s-style performers. The official video with the iTunes version track was uploaded to YouTube on 4 November 2008.

== Track listing ==
1. "Love, Love, Love" - 3:46
2. "I'll Take Everything" (Demo) - 3:14
3. "1973" (Live From The MAX Sessions, Sydney) - 5:37

== Charts ==
Chart (2008–2009)	Peak position
Mexico Ingles Airplay (Billboard)	18
Russia Airplay (TopHit)	298
Switzerland (Schweizer Hitparade)	59
UK Singles (OCC)	121
Ukraine Airplay (TopHit)	300
