= Stay the Night (James Blunt song) =

Single by James Blunt

from the album Some Kind of Trouble
- B-side: "Stay the Night" (Instrumental)
- Released: 25 October 2010
- Recorded: January 2010 (Los Angeles, California)
- Genre: Pop rock, roots rock
- Length: 3:36 (album version); 3:25 (U.S. edit)
- Label: Custard, Atlantic
- Songwriters: James Blunt, Bob Marley, Steve Robson, Ryan Tedder
- Producer: Steve Robson

James Blunt singles chronology
"Love, Love, Love" (2008)	"Stay the Night" (2010)	"So Far Gone" (2011)

"Stay the Night" is the lead single from English singer-songwriter James Blunt's third studio album, Some Kind of Trouble. The single was released on 25 October 2010. The single received an exclusive advance-release in Austria on 10 September 2010. The song was successful on the ARIA Charts, scoring his first top ten hit in Australia since 2005's "Goodbye My Lover".

== Background ==
"Stay the Night" was first written after Blunt stated he was "tired of writing self-pitying songs". In an interview for STV, Blunt claimed: "After the last tour I tried writing at the piano, but I was repeating myself, writing sad songs about poor old me. I needed to get away from music for a while. My new songs, most prominently 'Stay the Night', are more optimistic. One thing I did learn is that your artistic credibility goes out the window when you have a big record. 'You're Beautiful' meant something to me, but to most people, it's a song they sing when they're drunk." The lyrics in "Stay the Night" feature a reference to Bob Marley's classic "Is This Love" in the lines: Just like the song on my radio said / We’ll share the shelter of my single bed. Marley is credited as a co-writer. The version released on the U.S. edition of the album is different than the original; it features a fade-in intro and runs for a length of 3 minutes and 25 seconds.

== Live performances ==
Blunt performed the song live for the first time at the Help for Heroes Charity Concert in Twickenham on 12 September 2010. Blunt performed it on The Ellen DeGeneres Show on 9 February 2011.

== Critical reception ==
The song received positive reviews from critics, with many calling it one of the album's high points.

Ryan Brockington of the New York Post has called the song "very chipper and up-tempo", comparing it in sound to that of Train's hit "Hey, Soul Sister". Matthew Horton from BBC Music said that: "The single Stay the Night is a deceptively bright introduction, a joyous bit of fluff that sees Blunt waiting to make his move at a California party ("We’ve all been singing Billie Jean" – at least that's plausible, right?)". Molloy Woodcraft from The Guardian said: "The first single "Stay the Night" is a cheery, ramshackle workout reminiscent of David Gray or Natalie Imbruglia, quotes Bob Marley's "Three Little Birds" and name-checks "Billie Jean". Rick Pearson from Evening Standard was also positive, saying: "There's the folksy skip of the opening number, Stay the Night, which showcases Blunt's keening vocal".

== Track listing ==
Promotional

1. "Stay the Night" – 3:34
2. "Stay the Night" (Instrumental) – 3:34

Digital Download / UK CD Single

1. "Stay the Night" – 3:34

European CD1

1. "Stay the Night" – 3:34
2. "Stay the Night" (Wideboys Remix) – 6:05

European CD2

1. "Stay the Night" – 3:34
2. "Stay the Night" (Acoustic)
3. "Stay the Night" (Fred Falke Remix)
4. "Stay the Night" (Buzz Junkies Remix)
5. "Stay the Night" (Video)

US Digital Download

1. "Stay the Night" (US Edit) - 3:25
2. "Stay the Night" (Acoustic) - 3:30
3. "Stay the Night" (Buzz Junkies Remix) - 4:50
4. "Stay the Night" (Video) - 3:50

== Charts and certifications ==
=== Weekly charts ===
Chart (2010–11)	Peak position
Australia (ARIA)	10
Austria (Ö3 Austria Top 40)	6
Belgium (Ultratop 50 Flanders)	7
Belgium (Ultratop 50 Wallonia)	4
Canada Hot 100 (Billboard)	53
Czech Republic Airplay (ČNS IFPI)	50
Denmark Airplay (Tracklisten)	9
Europe (European Hot 100 Singles)	8
Finland (Suomen virallinen lista)	19
France (SNEP)	31
France (SNEP) Download Chart	14
Germany (GfK)	4
Germany (Airplay Chart)	1
Hungary (Editors' Choice Top 40)	23
Ireland (IRMA)	40
Italy (FIMI)	3
Italy Airplay (EarOne)	1
Japan (Japan Hot 100)	16
Luxembourg Digital Song Sales (Billboard)	8
Netherlands (Dutch Top 40)	5
Netherlands (Single Top 100)	13
New Zealand (Recorded Music NZ)	13
Spain (Promusicae)	26
Sweden (Sverigetopplistan)	44
Switzerland (Schweizer Hitparade)	1
UK Singles (Official Charts)	26
Ukraine Airplay (TopHit)	340
US Billboard Hot 100	94
US Adult Contemporary (Billboard)	30
US Adult Pop Airplay (Billboard)	28

=== Year-end charts ===
Chart (2010)	Position
Australia (ARIA)	88
Belgium (Ultratop 50 Flanders)	72
Belgium (Ultratop 50 Wallonia)	80
Germany (Official German Charts)	56
Italy (FIMI)	68
Italy Airplay (EarOne)	40
Netherlands (Dutch Top 40)	44
Netherlands (Single Top 100)	92
Switzerland (Schweizer Hitparade)	53

Chart (2011)	Position
Spain (PROMUSICAE)	17

=== Certifications ===
Region	Certification	Certified units/sales
Australia (ARIA)	Platinum	70,000^{^}
Germany (BVMI)	Gold	150,000^{^}
Italy (FIMI)	Gold	15,000^{‡}
New Zealand (RMNZ)	Gold	7,500^{*}
^{*} Sales figures based on certification alone.^{^} Shipments figures based on certification alone.^{‡} Sales+streaming figures based on certification alone.
