= So Far Gone (song) =

Single by James Blunt

from the album Some Kind of Trouble
- Released: 3 January 2011
- Recorded: January 2010 (Los Angeles, California)
- Length: 3:34
- Label: Custard, Atlantic
- Songwriters: James Blunt, Steve Robson, Ryan Tedder
- Producer: Steve Robson

James Blunt singles chronology
"Stay the Night" (2010)	"So Far Gone" (2011)	"If Time Is All I Have" (2011)

"So Far Gone" is the second single from English singer-songwriter James Blunt's third studio album, Some Kind of Trouble. The single was released as a digital download single release exclusively in the United Kingdom on 3 January 2011. A live version of the song, recorded at Metropolis Studios, was included on the OpenDisc feature of Some Kind of Trouble. Blunt performed the song live for the first time on Comedy Rocks with Jason Manford on 28 January 2011. Australian radio stations have picked up the song and are beginning to give it airplay as of March 2011.

== Music video ==
The video, directed by Marc Klasfeld, for the track premiered on Blunt's official YouTube account on 13 December 2010.

== Reception ==
Matthew Horton from BBC Music said that: "Best Laid Plans teems with cliché and some David Gilmour-lite guitar noodles that also rear up on So Far Gone." March Hirsh from Boston Globe said: "A few songs – midtempo anthem "So Far Gone,’’ quavery failed-romance ballad "Best Laid Plans'’ — fill up the earphones well enough but don't bother pushing an inch deeper to engage the head."

== Track listing ==
1. "So Far Gone" – 3:34

== Chart performance ==
The single became the first UK-released single by Blunt that did not enter the UK Singles Chart (top 100). In Belgium it entered the charts in both the Flanders and Wallonia regions. On 5 February, the song entered the Tipparade (Bubbling Under Chart) of the Dutch Top 40, and climbed to number 4. In Switzerland the song charted on the Airplay Top 30 Chart, peaking at number 6.

== Charts ==
Chart (2011)	Peak position
Austria (Ö3 Austria Top 40)	40
Belgium (Ultratip Bubbling Under Flanders)	16
Belgium (Ultratip Bubbling Under Wallonia)	2
Belgian (Wallonia) Airplay Chart	15
France (SNEP)	82
Hungary (Rádiós Top 40)	28
Italy (FIMI)	67
Netherlands (Dutch Top 40)	25
Swiss Airplay Top 30	6
