= Budapest (band) =

English post-grunge rock band

- Origin: Leamington Spa, England
- Genres: Post-grunge, alternative rock, post-Britpop
- Years active: 1999–2006
- Labels: Sinnamon Records, Easy Street Music
- Past members: John Garrison; Chris Pemberton; Adrian Kelley; Matt Parker; Paul Possart; Mark Walworth; Tom Visser; Mark Seabridge; Pete Wilson; Jimmy Lapworth

Budapest were a melancholic post-grunge rock band from Leamington Spa, England.

== History ==
The band were formed in 1999 by John Garrison (vocals, guitar) with Adrian Kelley (bass), Mark Walworth (guitar), Paul Possart (drums), and Chris Pemberton (piano, keyboards). After recording the material for their first album, Too Blind to Hear, Walworth committed suicide. Although shocked by this event, the remaining members of the band (Walworth being replaced by lead guitar Matt Parker later on) carried on with the release of the album, in tribute to their deceased partner. It appeared in September 2002 in UK, and was released in the United States in March 2004.

In 2003, the band played themselves in the two-part UK TV drama Final Demand for BBC One. The movie featured English actress Tamzin Outhwaite.

In August 2003, the band played at Festival Internacional de Benicàssim in Spain.

The follow-up 2005 album, Head Towards The Dawn (on which Garrison and Pemberton were the only remaining band players), was released in Spain only.

The band announced its end in the later part of 2006.

After the demise of the band, John Garrison embarked on to a solo career; Chris Pemberton has been playing keyboards with John Grant.

== Discography ==
- Too Blind to Hear (UK 2002, US 2004)
- Head Towards the Dawn (Spain 2004)
