= If Time Is All I Have =

"If Time is All I Have"

Single by James Blunt

from the album Some Kind of Trouble
- Released: 4 April 2011
- Recorded: January 2010 (Los Angeles, California)
- Genre: Soft rock
- Length: 3:36
- Label: Custard, Atlantic
- Songwriter(s): James Blunt, Eg White
- Producer(s): Tom Rothrock

James Blunt singles chronology
"So Far Gone" (2011)	"If Time is All I Have" (2011)	"I'll Be Your Man" (2011)

Alternative cover
- UK promo cover

"If Time is All I Have" is the third single from English singer-songwriter James Blunt's third studio album, Some Kind of Trouble. The single was released as a digital download single in the United Kingdom on 4 April 2011. The single failed to chart on the UK Singles Chart, similar to the album's previous single, So Far Gone. The song was released in Australia as the album's second single and has charted on the ARIA Charts at number 53. The single features similar artwork to that used for So Far Gone, however, used a red-based background instead of a black-based background. Both releases have an image of the child from the Some Kind of Trouble artwork on the disc.

== Background ==
Blunt penned this stark, heartfelt ballad of regret with Eg White. The British songwriter is best known for his contributions to Will Young's Ivor Novello winning hit "Leave Right Now" and Adele's international smash, "Chasing Pavements." Blunt admitted in an interview with The Daily Telegraph that his songs of regret are always about the same girl. He said: "Your first love is probably the most idealistic. I probably do have a sense of romantic yearning, but I'm really a failed romantic, as the songs attest." The girl in question is thought to be Dixie Chassay, a casting director who has worked on the Harry Potter movies, whom Blunt dated long before he became famous. Blunt mentions her in the liner notes on his first album and it is believed she was the ex who inspired him to write "You're Beautiful."

== Critical reception ==
Colin Somerville from Scotsman said that: "If Time Is All I Have cranks up the pathos in James's trademark tremulous vocal, but the song sadly wafts away on the over-emotive hot air."

== Track listing ==
1. "If Time Is All I Have" – 3:36

== Chart performance ==
The song debut at number sixty-four on the ARIA Singles Chart. It eventually climbed to its peak position at 53.

== Music video ==
Directed by Robert Hales, the video was released on 16 March 2011. The video premiered on YouTube. The video features Blunt walking through the streets of Los Angeles, witnessing life-changing incidents which reflect the lyrics of the song.

== Charts ==
Chart (2011)	Peak position
ARIA Australian Singles Chart	53

== Release history ==
Region	Date	Format
United Kingdom	21 December 2010	Digital Download (Amazon)
United Kingdom	4 April 2011	Digital Download (Official)
