= Dangerous (James Blunt song) =

Single by James Blunt

from the album Some Kind of Trouble
- Released: 26 July 2011
- Recorded: January 2010 (Los Angeles, California)
- Genre: Pop rock
- Length: 3:10
- Label: Custard Records, Atlantic Records
- Songwriter(s): James Blunt and Steve Robson
- Producer(s): Steve Robson

James Blunt singles chronology
"I'll Be Your Man" (2011)	"Dangerous" (2011)	"Bonfire Heart" (2013)

"Dangerous" is a song by British singer-songwriter James Blunt. It was released as the fifth single from his third studio album, Some Kind of Trouble on 26 July 2011. The song was written by James Blunt and Steve Robson.

== Music video ==
A music video to accompany the release of "Dangerous" was first released onto YouTube on 20 September 2011 at a total length of three minutes and nineteen seconds. The video, directed by Luc Janin, was filmed at London burlesque club Volupté. It is filmed from the perspective of a woman walking through various rooms in the club, including kitchens, until at the end of the video she encounters Blunt. It was filmed in a single tracking shot.

== Track listing ==
UK Digital Download

1. "Dangerous" – 3:10

== Chart performance ==
Chart (2011)	Peak position
Belgium (Ultratip Bubbling Under Flanders)	75

== Release history ==
Region	Date	Format	Label
United Kingdom	26 July 2011	Digital download	Custard Records, Atlantic Records
