= John Garrison (musician) =

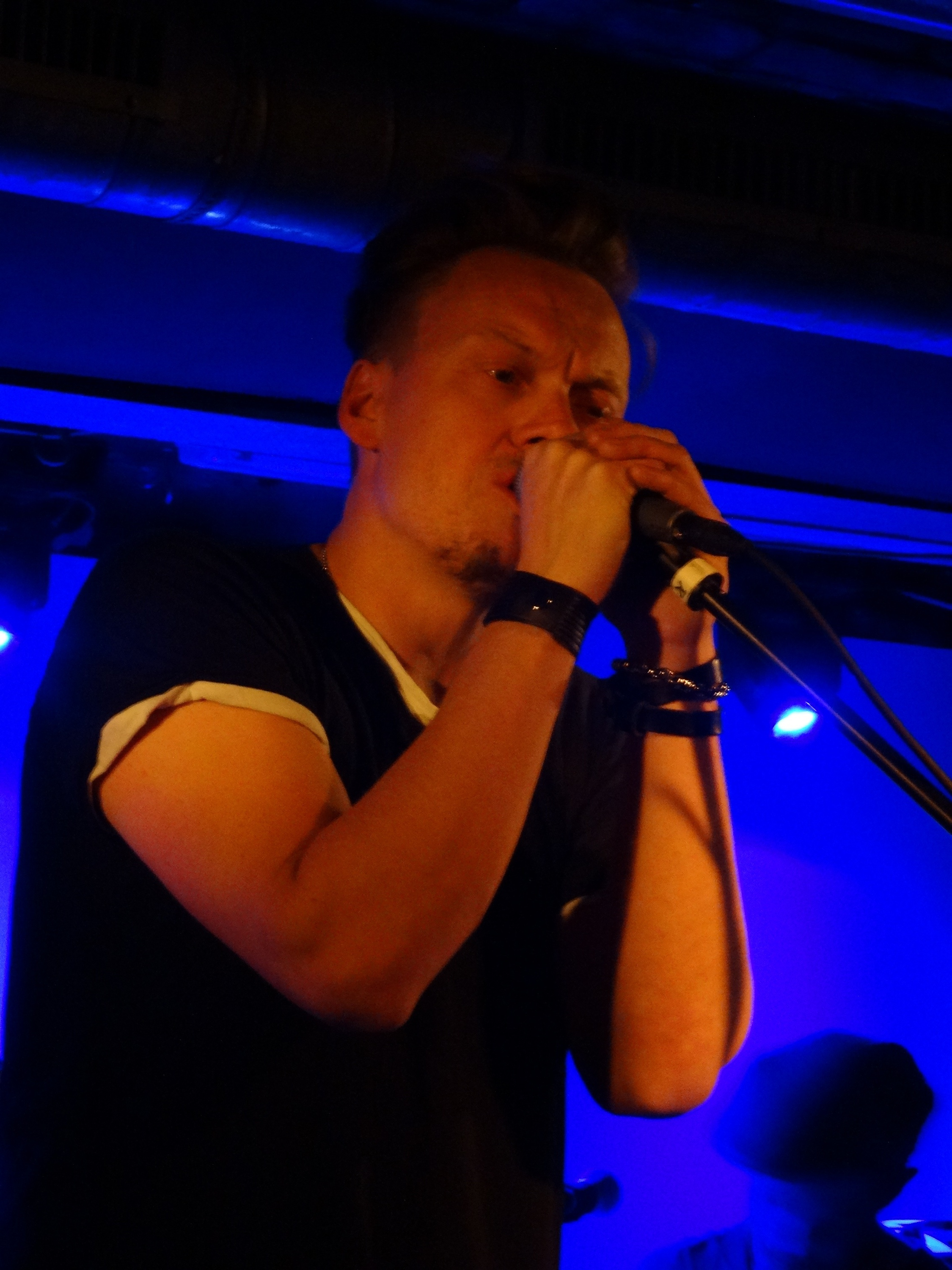
- John Garrison performing in Berlin, April 2015

Background information
- Also known as: Johnny Vic, Satellites
- Born: John Garrison; 7 January 1973 (age 53); Liverpool, England
- Origin: Coventry, England
- Genres: Indie rock, alternative rock, electronic
- Occupation: Bass player
- Instruments: Vocals, guitar, bass, drums, piano
- Years active: 1999–present
- Labels: Republic, Johnny Vic Records, Vesterbrother, Garrison Music Ltd
- Website: garrisonmusic.com

John Garrison (born 7 January 1973) is an English musician, singer-songwriter, multi-instrumentalist, and producer. Co-founder of the British alternative rock band Budapest, he recorded and performed with them from 1999 to 2006. After the band split, he launched a career as a solo artist and has released three albums: “Above The Cosmos” (2007), “Departures” (2009) and “Extinguisher” (2020). He released a 4-Track EP "Time Trader" in March 2024. He also recorded three albums under the name Satellites. In parallel to his solo career, Garrison is a session bass player for other major label artists such as Lewis Capaldi, Ed Sheeran, Robbie Williams, James Blunt, Christina Aguilera and Leona Lewis in the studio and on the road.

== Early life ==
Garrison was born in Liverpool, then moved to Coventry, England, at the age of one. His father was the head of music at University of Warwick and John grew up surrounded by music with easy access to orchestral instruments. His mother and two sisters are opera singers. He performed his first ever gig at the age of three playing the piano with his sister. Determined to be self-taught, he refused to take music lessons.

== Career ==
Garrison settled in New York City after Budapest broke up in 2006. His first solo albums Above the Cosmos and Departures were released independently and received critical acclaim. A small number of gigs have been performed in the United States and Europe.

The whole Satellites project started soon after John became a father and had moved to Copenhagen. The name was chosen because "satellites just report back what they see. They never stay in one place and they don't really belong anywhere". In fact, it's not a band but one man, Johnny Vic, who writes, plays and produces as Satellites.

In 2022, Garrison played bass guitar on the Lewis Capaldi no.1 hit “Forget Me”.

== Personal life ==
He is now based in Copenhagen, Denmark, where he lives with his Danish girlfriend and their two children.

== Discography ==
=== Albums, singles and EP ===
with Budapest

- Too Blind To Hear (2002)
- Head Towards The Dawn (2004)

Solo

- Above The Cosmos (2007)
- Departures (2009) – Named Britsound Radio's "British album of the year".
- Satellites.01 (2012) – Rough Trade No. 16 Album of 2012.
- Satellites.02 (2013) – Rough Trade Album of the month August 2013.
  - Wasteland – Single
- Istedgade EP (2014)
  - Neon Sun – Single
- Wasteland Remix EP (2014)
- Satellites Saint Saviour (2015)
- Satellites.04: Glitch (2016)
- Extinguisher (2020)
  - Blissfully Ignorant – Single
  - The Revolution Is Just Waiting A Name – Single
- Lovely Day isn't It? (2021)
- Time Trader EP (2024)
