= The Girl That Never Was =

2023 single by James Blunt

Single by James Blunt

from the album Who We Used to Be
- Released: 4 October 2023
- Genre: Pop
- Length: 3:13
- Label: Atlantic Records UK
- Songwriter(s): James Blunt; George Tizzard; Rick Parkhouse
- Producer(s): Red Triangle

James Blunt singles chronology
"All The Love That I Ever Needed" (2023)	"The Girl That Never Was" (2023)	"Tears Dry Tonight" (2025)

Music video
- "The Girl That Never Was" on YouTube

"The Girl That Never Was" is a song by English singer-songwriter James Blunt. It was released by Atlantic Records UK on 4 October 2023 as the third single from Blunt's seventh studio album, Who We Used to Be.

== Background ==
"The Girl That Never Was" was written by Blunt, George Tizzard and Rick Parkhouse. It was written about Blunt and his wife losing a child through miscarriage.

== Live performance ==
On 27 October 2023, Blunt performed the song on the BBC's The One Show. On writing the song, Blunt shared "I'm married. We had aspirations to start a family and...people in my situation have gone through that, you win some battles and you lose some [...] the ones that we have lost we struggle with a bit."

== Music video ==
A lyric video was released on the day of the single's official release, with the official music video, directed by Vaughan Arnell released on 12 October 2023. On 20 October 2023, Blunt released a video showing an acoustic performance of "The Girl That Never Was".

== Chart performance ==
The single peaked at number 7 on the UK Singles Downloads Chart Top 100 on 3 November 2023. It appeared on that chart for seven consecutive weeks.

== Charts ==
Chart performance for "The Girl That Never Was"
Chart (2023)	Peak position
UK Singles Downloads (OCC)	7
