= Beside You (James Blunt song) =

Song by James Blunt

Single by James Blunt

from the album Who We Used to Be
- Released: 2 August 2023
- Genre: Dance-pop • electropop
- Length: 3:05
- Label: Atlantic Records UK
- Songwriters: James Blunt; Richard Boardman; David Strääf; Ennio Morricone; James Essien

James Blunt singles chronology
| "Adrenaline" (2022) | "Beside You" (2023) | "All The Love That I Ever Needed" (2023) |

Music video
- "Beside You" on YouTube

"Beside You" is a song by English singer-songwriter James Blunt. It was released by Atlantic Records UK on 2 August 2023 as the lead single from the singer's seventh studio album, Who We Used to Be. The song loosely interpolates "Alla Luce Del Giorno" by Italian composer Ennio Morricone.

== Music video ==
The official music video was released on 10 August 2023. It was directed by Craig Bingham.

== Live performances ==
Blunt performed the single on The Late Late Show with Patrick Kielty.

== Chart performance ==
On 25 August 2023, "Beside You" peaked at number 22 on the UK Singles Downloads Chart, and appeared on that chart for eight consecutive weeks.

== Charts ==
=== Weekly charts ===
Chart performance for "Beside You"
| Chart (2023–24) | Peak position |
|---|---|
| CIS Airplay (TopHit) | 92 |
| Estonia Airplay (TopHit) | 22 |
| Lithuania Airplay (TopHit) | 34 |
| Poland (Polish Airplay Top 100) | 2 |
| Poland (Polish Streaming Top 100) | 65 |
| San Marino (SMRRTV Top 50) | 29 |
| Slovakia Airplay (ČNS IFPI) | 32 |
| UK Singles Downloads (OCC) | 22 |

=== Year-end charts ===
2023 year-end chart performance for "Beside You"
| Chart (2023) | Position |
|---|---|
| Estonia Airplay (TopHit) | 197 |
| Poland (Polish Airplay Top 100) | 23 |

2024 year-end chart performance for "Beside You"
| Chart (2024) | Position |
|---|---|
| Poland (Polish Airplay Top 100) | 76 |

== Certifications ==
Certification for "Beside You"
| Region | Certification | Certified units/sales |
|---|---|---|
| Poland (ZPAV) | Platinum | 50,000^{‡} |
^{‡} Sales+streaming figures based on certification alone.
