= I'll Be Your Man =

Single by James Blunt

from the album Some Kind of Trouble
- Released: 23 May 2011
- Recorded: January 2010 (Los Angeles, California)
- Genre: Soft rock
- Length: 3:37
- Label: Custard, Atlantic
- Songwriter(s): James Blunt, Kevin Griffin
- Producer(s): Kevin Griffin and Warren Huart

James Blunt singles chronology
"If Time Is All I Have" (2011)	"I'll Be Your Man" (2011)	"Dangerous" (2011)

"I'll Be Your Man" is a song by British singer-songwriter James Blunt. It was released as the fourth single from his third studio album, Some Kind of Trouble. The single was released as a digital download single on 23 May 2011, and as a physical single on 9 September 2011. The song also was released in the United States, where Blunt performed on the Conan O'Brien show and Dancing with the Stars. A music video was released on 26 May 2011, and featured footage of Blunt's Some Kind of Trouble tour.

== Critical reception ==
Marc Hirsh from Boston Globe said that: "Blunt’s happy on those Train tracks: He pulls the same trick nine songs later (minus the whoas) on "I’ll Be Your Man.'’ ("So baby come over from the end of the sofa,’’ the romantic sings on that one, too lazy to move five feet on his own.) Stephen Thomas Erlewine from AllMusic was positive, saying that: "Blunt’s strength is his embrace of soft rock cliché, whether he’s cheerfully bouncing along on "I’ll Be Your Man". Colin Somerville from Scotsman said positively that: "I'll Be Your Man is Blunt getting in touch with his inner teen idol, all chugging acoustic guitar and an excuse to twitch the pelvis." Simon Price from The Independent was negative, saying that: "When he tries to do "seductive" ("I'll Be Your Man") it's embarrassing." Mike Schiller from PopMatters said that: ""I’ll Be Your Man" could be John Cougar Mellencamp. Maybe such similarities could be chalked up to homage, to an artist wanting to pay tribute to those that made him such a success, but these songs are prototypical of their influences to the point of caricature", he completed.

== Track listing ==
UK Digital Download / Promo CD single

1. "I'll Be Your Man" (Single Version) – 3:36

German CD single

1. "I'll Be Your Man" (Single Version) – 3:36
2. "I'll Be Your Man" (Album Version) – 3:32
3. "This Love Again" – 2:56
4. "I'll Be Your Man" (Video)

== Charts ==
Chart (2011)	Peak position
Austria (Ö3 Austria Top 40)	45
Belgium (Ultratip Bubbling Under Flanders)	6
Belgium (Ultratip Bubbling Under Wallonia)	10
Germany (Media Control AG)	40
Netherlands (Dutch Top 40 (Tipparade))	13
Switzerland (Schweizer Hitparade)	64

== Release history ==
Region	Date	Format
United Kingdom	23 May 2011	Digital download
Germany	9 September 2011	Digital download, CD single
