= Some Kind of Trouble =

Studio album by James Blunt
- Released: 8 November 2010
- Recorded: January–August 2010
- Genres: Pop rock, folk rock
- Length: 46:04
- Labels: Atlantic, Custard
- Producers: Kevin Griffin, Warren Huart, Greg Kurstin, Steve Robson, Eg White

James Blunt chronology
All the Lost Souls (2007)	Some Kind of Trouble (2010)	Moon Landing (2013)

Some Kind of Trouble: Revisited

Singles from Some Kind of Trouble
- 1. "Stay the Night" Released: 25 October 2010; 2. "So Far Gone" Released: 3 January 2011; 3. "If Time Is All I Have" Released: 4 April 2011; 4. "I'll Be Your Man" Released: 23 May 2011; 5. "Dangerous" Released: 12 September 2011

Some Kind of Trouble is the third studio album by British singer-songwriter James Blunt, released on 8 November 2010. On 6 December 2011, a deluxe version of the album was released, titled Some Kind of Trouble: Revisited.

== Background ==
In an interview with Contact Music, Blunt said of the album: "After the last tour, I tried writing at the piano, but I found I was repeating myself, writing sad songs about poor old me. I needed wife bad. My new songs are more positive. One thing I did learn is that your artistic credibility goes out the window then you had a record that big. Now I have a bigger record. 'You're Beautiful' meant something to me, but to most people, it's a song they sing when they're drunk." In an interview with Robert Copsey from Digital Spy, Blunt describes the album, saying "It's got a certain innocence to it, which my last album didn't have. It doesn't sound like the current popular electro sound; it sounds like the late 70s / early 80s when the US electric guitar bands came to the UK. What I really like about it is its energy and optimism – it's completely positive." While answering what is his favorite track from the album, he answered "My favourite track is probably 'Turn Me On'."

The album cover depicts an image of YouTuber Shay Carl Butler throwing his daughter Emmi ("Babytard") up in the air. The original photo was taken by Butler's wife, Colette, with an iPhone.

=== Music ===
The album features 12 new songs and was produced by Steve Robson (with additional production from Greg Kurstin, Eg White, Kevin Griffin and Warren Huart). It sees Blunt, capturing a new feeling of spontaneity and freshness summed up by his comment that he sees his first two albums as a pair of book ends – action and reaction. Some Kind of Trouble, then, is very much the start of a new chapter. The album was recorded largely in London with members of James' touring band. Produced mainly by Steve Robson, key tracks include the bittersweet "These are the Words," the trenchant, pointed "Superstar" and the infectious "Stay the Night," a sexy, acoustic guitar driven, party song about "singing ‘Billie Jean’ and mixing vodka and caffeine." Written by Blunt, Robson, and OneRepublic’s Ryan Tedder, the song also shouts-out to the legendary Bob Marley, referencing the reggae master's "Is This Love." In addition to collecting his first (and likely last) co-write with Marley, "Stay the Night" marks the first time Blunt has written with two other songwriters in the same room or started songs from scratch. In addition to Robson, with whom he wrote the majority of the album, Blunt also wrote with The Bird and the Bee’s Greg Kurstin, Kevin Griffin, Wayne Hector and "All the Lost Souls" collaborator Eg White, with whom he wrote the brash "Turn Me On", which will probably dispel the idea of Blunt as "Mr. Sensitive". "People expect me to be quite a serious person, who takes life and myself seriously, and that’s not really the case", he says. "Maybe they’ll see another side in this album?". The album's anchor is "No Tears", an unsentimental ballad about "the summing up of a life", Blunt says. "There are certain songs along the way that are milestones – that define a writer to themselves. Goodbye My Lover was that song on the first album. Same Mistake was from the second. No Tears is my milestone on this album".

== Singles ==
The album's lead single, "Stay the Night", was released on 11 September 2010 as the first British and American single. It achieved success in many parts of the world, reaching number-one on the Swiss charts, the top ten on the Australian, Belgian, Dutch, German and Italian charts, the top forty on the UK Singles Chart and the top 100 on the Billboard Hot 100. The second single, "So Far Gone", was released on 3 January 2011, as the second British single and first Australian single. It failed to chart on the UK Singles Chart, but reached the top ten on the Swiss charts and made the top forty in the Netherlands and Hungary. The third single, "If Time Is All I Have", was released on 4 April 2011 as the third British single and second Australian single. It failed to chart on the UK Singles Chart, but peaked on the ARIA Charts at number sixty-four. "I'll Be Your Man" was released as the fourth British single and second American single on 5 May 2011. It was officially released to iTunes on 23 May 2011. Blunt performed it on the Conan O'Brien show and on Dancing with the Stars. The music video was released on 26 May 2011 and was shot while James was touring. "Dangerous" was released as the fifth British single on 12 September 2011. "Calling Out Your Name" was included on the Brazilian soap opera Insensato Coração and was subsequently released as the only single from the album there.

== Critical reception ==
Professional ratings
Aggregate scores
Source	Rating
Metacritic	(45/100)
Review scores
Source	Rating
AllMusic	3.5/5 stars
BBC Music	(mixed)
Boston Globe	(mixed)
Entertainment Weekly	(C−)
Evening Standard	3/5 stars
The Guardian	(negative)
The Independent	(mixed)
Los Angeles Times	2/4 stars
MusicOMH	2.5/5 stars
PopMatters	(3/10)

Upon its release, the album received mixed reviews from most music critics, based on an aggregate score of 45/100 from Metacritic. Stephen Thomas Erlewine from AllMusic was positive in his review, referring to the album as a "step in the right direction for Blunt, a move toward love songs free of pretension." Matthew Horton from BBC Music had more mixed feelings, saying: "When all's said, Some Kind of Trouble is not a terrible record by any means, but there's little sense that Blunt has advanced—and equally little sense that it'll make any difference to his bottom line." Mac Hirsch from Boston Globe was mixed, saying: "From the plinky, high-tuned acoustic guitar to the mindlessly skippy rhythm to the "whoa-oh-oh-ooh" chant, there's not a major element of "Stay the Night" that doesn't sound exactly like "Hey, Soul Sister." For some, that's a selling point; for others, a warning siren." Leah Greenblatt from Entertainment Weekly gave a "C−" rating, saying: "Some Kind of Trouble comes off as inert and oddly hollow; apart from the album's comparatively lively bookends."

Matt Diehl from Los Angeles Times was somewhat more favorable, saying: "Despite all the work put into his workmanlike pop, it ultimately comes off as agreeable, but not memorable." The Observer gave the album a favorable review, calling it "a cheery, ramshackle". Jamie Milton from musicOMH was also favourable, saying: "When Blunt sticks to playing it safe, he offends the least. And whilst it seems contrived to applaud an artist for sticking to his zone, this man is an exceptional case."

Molloy Woodcraft from The Guardian was negative with his review, describing the album as a "Shallow, soulless and strangely cynical, Some Kind of Trouble is a thoroughly depressing listen." Gavin Martin from Daily Mirror was also mixed, saying: "Some Kind of Trouble repeatedly surprises with its ability to find new depths of awfulness, right down to the toe-curling, heavy rock closer Turn Me on where his wimpering sex monkey persona is stripped naked." Simon Price from The Independent was also mixed, saying: "On his third album, featuring the dread hand of Linda Perry, Blunt once again shows all the soulfulness of the junior Chris de Burgh he so blatantly is. Cliché follows cliché and banality follows banality: he's got a heart of gold, he'll always be by your side, and so on, like a Hallmark Cards random verse generator." Mike Schiller from PopMatters rated it three stars out of ten, enjoying "Stay the Night" but saying that: "Aside from the brilliant departure offered by the album’s opener, Blunt has lost all concept of how to sound like himself. His voice is the same, but it’s singing songs that don’t sound like his songs."

Rick Pearson from Evening Standard was positive and he liked the album, saying: "it's 35 minutes of well-crafted pop music – and [I] see no trouble with that."

== Commercial performance ==
The album debut at number four on the UK Albums Chart, with first-week sales of 100,000 copies. On the Billboard 200, the album debuted at number eleven, with sales of 26,000 copies. To date, the album has sold over 1 million copies worldwide.

== Track listing ==
- Standard edition
1. "Stay the Night" (Blunt, Robson, Tedder, Marley) – 3:36
2. "Dangerous" (Blunt, Robson) – 3:10
3. "Best Laid Plans" (Blunt, Hector, Robson) – 3:30
4. "So Far Gone" (Blunt, Robson, Tedder) – 3:34
5. "No Tears" (Blunt, Hector, Robson) – 3:50
6. "Superstar" (Blunt, Kurstin) – 3:49
7. "These Are the Words" (Blunt, Hector, Robson) – 3:23
8. "Calling Out Your Name" (Blunt, Hector, Robson) – 3:24
9. "Heart of Gold" (Blunt, Robson) – 3:31
10. "I'll Be Your Man" (Blunt, Kevin Griffin) – 3:37
11. "If Time Is All I Have" (Blunt, White) – 3:25
12. Empty Track – 0:05
13. "Turn Me On" (Blunt, White) – 2:29
- UK physical edition bonus content

14. "Stay the Night" (Live at Metropolis) (video) – 3:46
15. "So Far Gone" (Live at Metropolis) (video) – 4:00
16. "If Time Is All I Have" (Live at Metropolis) (audio) – 3:25

- UK digital edition bonus content

14. "Into the Dark" – 2:50
15. "Stay the Night" (video) – 3:46
16. "Stay the Night" (Making of the Video) – 3:00

- Amazon.co.uk bonus track

14. "There She Goes Again" – 3:49

- Japanese bonus track

14. "This Love Again" – 2:58

- German bonus tracks

14. "Into the Dark" – 2:50
15. "There She Goes Again" – 3:49

- German deluxe edition bonus DVD
1. "Stay the Night" (video)
2. "So Far Gone" (video)
3. "If Time Is All I Have" (video)
4. "Stay the Night" (Making of the Video)
5. "Some Kind of Trouble" (Making of the Album)
- US standard edition alternate track

1. "Stay the Night" (US edit) – 3:25

- US deluxe edition bonus tracks

14. "You're Beautiful" (Live in Belgium) (Blunt, Skarbek) – 3:38
15. "If Time Is All I Have" (Live in Belgium) (Blunt, White) – 3:31

- US digital edition bonus content

14. "Into the Dark" – 2:50
15. "There She Goes Again" – 3:49
16. "This Love Again" – 2:58
17. "Stay the Night" (Fred Falke Remix) – 3:36
18. "Stay the Night" (video)

- Some Kind of Trouble: Revisited bonus tracks

14. "Into the Dark" – 2:50
15. "There She Goes Again" – 3:49
16. "Stay the Night" (Fred Falke Remix) – 3:36
17. "Dangerous" (Deniz Koyu & Johan Wedel Remix) – 5:11

- Some Kind of Trouble: Revisited bonus DVD

Live in Paleo

1. "So Far Gone"
2. "Dangerous"
3. "Billy"
4. "Wisemen"
5. "Carry You Home"
6. "These Are the Words"
7. "I'll Take Everything"
8. "Out of My Mind"
9. "Goodbye My Lover"
10. "High"
11. "Same Mistake"
12. "Turn Me On"
13. "Superstar"
14. "You're Beautiful"
15. "So Long, Jimmy"
16. "I'll Be Your Man"
17. "Stay the Night"
18. "1973"

Music videos

1. "Stay the Night"
2. "So Far Gone"
3. "If Time Is All I Have"
4. "I'll Be Your Man"
5. "Dangerous"

== Charts ==
=== Weekly charts ===
Chart (2010–2013)	Peak position
Australian Albums (ARIA)	5
Austrian Albums (Ö3 Austria)	3
Belgian Albums (Ultratop Flanders)	14
Belgian Albums (Ultratop Wallonia)	2
Canadian Albums (Billboard)	6
Danish Albums (Hitlisten)	10
Dutch Albums (Album Top 100)	2
Finnish Albums (Suomen virallinen lista)	9
French Albums (SNEP)	3
German Albums (Offizielle Top 100)	2
Irish Albums (IRMA)	6
Italian Albums (FIMI)	7
New Zealand Albums (RMNZ)	7
Norwegian Albums (VG-lista)	16
Portuguese Albums (AFP)	28
Spanish Albums (Promusicae)	17
Swedish Albums (Sverigetopplistan)	18
Swiss Albums (Schweizer Hitparade)	1
UK Albums (Official Charts)	4
US Billboard 200	11

=== Year-end charts ===
Chart (2010)	Position
Australian Albums (ARIA)	36
Austrian Albums (Ö3 Austria)	54
Belgian Albums (Ultratop Wallonia)	64
Dutch Albums (Album Top 100)	72
French Albums (SNEP)	25
German Albums (Offizielle Top 100)	28
Italian Albums (FIMI)	83
New Zealand Albums (RMNZ)	23
Swiss Albums (Schweizer Hitparade)	18
UK Albums (OCC)	63

Chart (2011)	Position
Australian Albums (ARIA)	52
Austrian Albums (Ö3 Austria)	58
Belgian Albums (Ultratop Flanders)	93
Belgian Albums (Ultratop Wallonia)	32
Dutch Albums (Album Top 100)	94
Swiss Albums (Schweizer Hitparade)	24
UK Albums (OCC)	151

== Certifications ==
Region	Certification	Certified units/sales
Australia (ARIA)	Platinum	70,000^{^}
Austria (IFPI Austria)	Gold	10,000^{*}
Belgium (BRMA)	Gold	15,000^{*}
France (SNEP)	2× Platinum	200,000^{*}
Germany (BVMI)	Platinum	200,000^{^}
Ireland (IRMA)	Gold	7,500^{^}
Italy (FIMI)	Gold	30,000^{*}
Netherlands (NVPI)	Gold	25,000^{^}
New Zealand (RMNZ)	Platinum	15,000^{^}
Poland (ZPAV)	Gold	10,000^{*}
Switzerland (IFPI Switzerland)	Platinum	30,000^{^}
United Kingdom (BPI)	Platinum	300,000^{*}
Summaries
Europe (IFPI)	Platinum	1,000,000^{*}
^{*} Sales figures based on certification alone.^{^} Shipments figures based on certification alone.
