= Monsters (James Blunt song) =

Song by James Blunt

Single by James Blunt

from the album Once Upon a Mind
- Released: 1 November 2019
- Genre: Pop
- Length: 4:19
- Label: Atlantic Records UK
- Songwriters: Blunt, Amy Wadge and Jimmy Hogarth

James Blunt singles chronology
"I Told You" (2019)	"Monsters" (2019)	"Halfway" (2020)

Music video
- "Monsters" on YouTube

"Monsters" is a song by English singer-songwriter James Blunt. It was written by Blunt, Amy Wadge and Jimmy Hogarth for Blunt's sixth studio album, Once Upon a Mind (2019). It was released as the fourth single from the album on 1 November 2019.

Blunt chose to donate all of the profit made from the song to Help for Heroes and British Legion charities.

== Background ==
James Blunt's father Charles Blount was diagnosed with stage four chronic kidney disease. The disease is incurable without a transplant, and Blunt wrote the song when he realised that his father could soon die. In "Monsters", Blunt expressed his feelings about his father and his illness, almost as if the song is a farewell to his father". In an interview with Good Morning Britain, Blunt said:

Really that has been an amazing moment. Because when you realise your father's mortality it's a great opportunity to say the things I'd like to say to him. So I have written a song called Monsters for him.

In another interview, Blunt said:

In many ways, the song, the lyric, it speaks as if I was speaking the words that I might have said to my children as well. When my children talk about the monsters, that’s [what] I sing to my father. It’s my turn to chase the monsters away like he would have done once with me.

As Blunt's blood type was not a match for him to be a donor, in the Good Morning Britain interview, he made a plea for type O positive kidney donors to step forward. In January 2020, it was reported a kidney donor had been found and Blunt's father was scheduled for a transplant. The donor of the kidney was a cousin with the same name as his father, and the transplant was successful.

== Music video ==
The music video was filmed in Oxfordshire, United Kingdom, and it was directed by Vaughan Arnell. The music video features James Blunt and his father Charles Blount. The video focuses on a close up of James Blunt's face as he sings the first two verses and choruses of the song, and then switches to a wider angle showing him and his father sitting at a table while he sings the final part. Throughout the video, Blunt is visibly emotional and tearful.

Australian television presenter Lisa Wilkinson said she was "left bawling" after watching the music video of the song. Monika Barton of Newshub wrote about the music video, "Go on, have a little watch and see if you have a heart, or merely just a sharp, pointy piece of flint where it should be".

== Reception ==
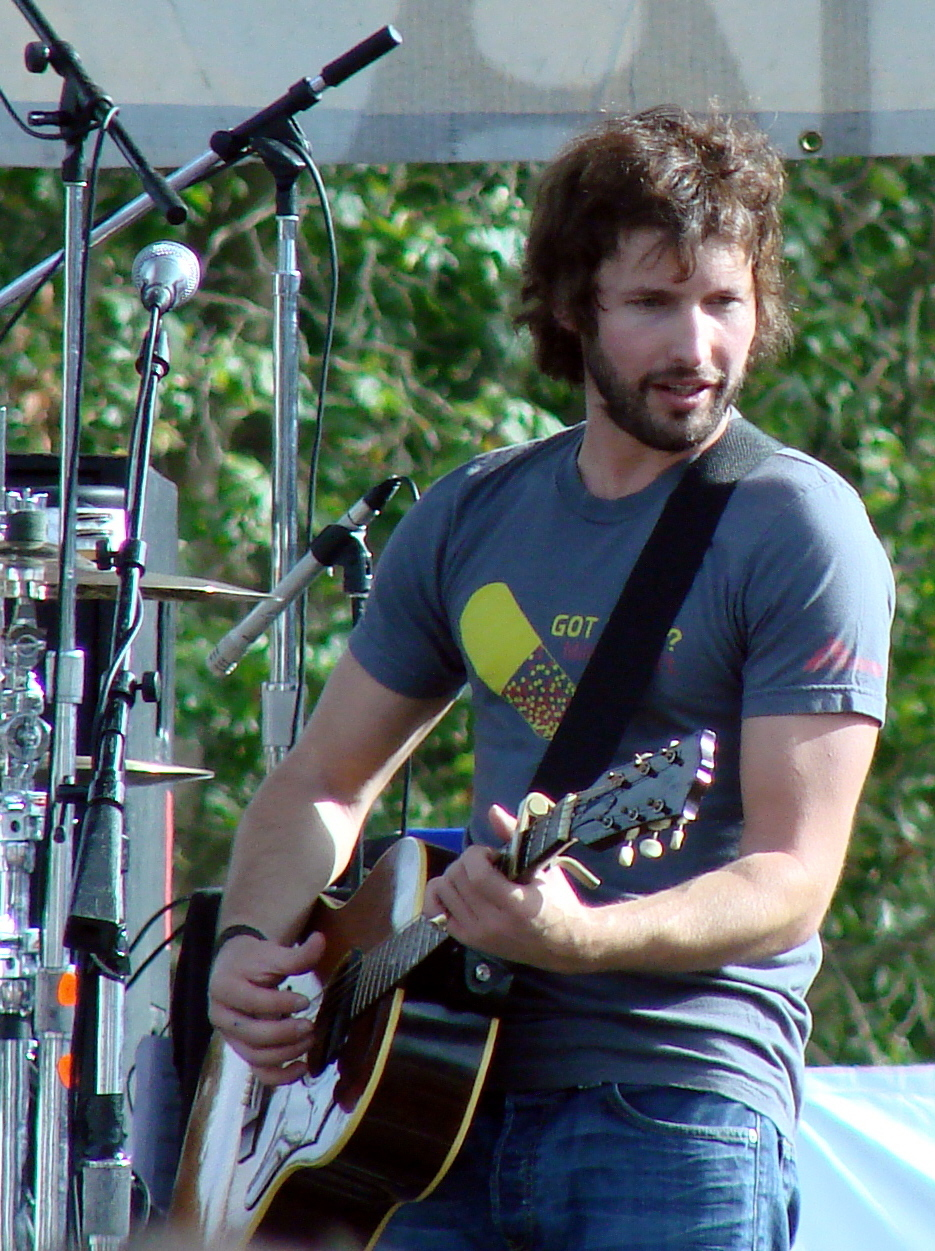
Blunt wrote the song to express his feelings about his father.

Minnie Wright of the Daily Express wrote, "Heartbreaking perspective illuminates the place from which Blunt has penned the deeply personal Once Upon A Mind with the arrival of Monster". Lauren Murphy of Entertainment.ie wrote, "Before you watch this video, be warned that it's pretty tough going if you're feeling in any way emotionally fragile, or have lost a parent". Rudi Kinsella of Joe wrote, "This is one of the most emotional music videos we've seen in a very long time".

== Charts ==
=== Weekly charts ===
Weekly chart performance
Chart (2020)	Peak position
Canada Digital Song Sales (Billboard)	13
France (SNEP)	38
Ireland	70
UK Singles (Official Charts Company)	74

Chart (2023)	Peak position
Canada Digital Song Sales (Billboard)	5
US Digital Song Sales (Billboard)	3

=== Year-end charts ===
Annual chart rankings
Chart (2023)	Rank
US Digital Song Sales (Billboard)	75

== Certifications ==
Region	Certification	Certified units/sales
New Zealand (RMNZ)	Platinum	30,000^{‡}
United Kingdom (BPI)	Gold	400,000^{‡}
^{‡} Sales+streaming figures based on certification alone.

== In popular culture ==
American Idol Season 21 winner Iam Tongi auditioned with this song, which went viral and became the show's most viewed audition video on its YouTube page. Tongi dedicated the song to his dad, who had died from kidney disease a few months prior to the audition.

Blunt did not know that Tongi would audition with "Monsters" until he learned that the song briefly topped the U.S. iTunes chart after the audition aired. He described Tongi's audition as "deeply moving... you can't help but be touched. I was like everyone else when I watched him do it, I became a fan."

Blunt and Tongi performed a duet of the song on Idol's season finale, with the pair trading lyrics until the latter broke down during the middle of the song. Tongi eventually regained his composure and finished, earning a hug from Blunt at the end. Blunt said of the performance,

"Breathe a last word/You can feel my hand on your own... That was the bit I sang on American Idol with Iam Tongi and he broke down in tears, thinking about his own father. You suddenly realize the desperation of that moment, because, for him, his father had died and [was] really living that."

The song appeared on Billboard's Digital Songs chart at No. 4, from 10,000 downloads.

Blunt and Tongi released a studio version of their duet on August 25, 2023. Tongi wrote on social media, "From covering it on TikTok 3 years ago to singing it in my audition on @americanidol, to performing it at the Idol finale with @jamesblunt , “Monsters” means so much to me."

On May 1, 2024, Tongi performed a duet of "Monsters" with fellow contestant Oliver Steele at Steele's father Toby's funeral. Steele posted the performance on his Instagram account, drawing condolences and praise from Idol fans and alumni. He wrote, "I'll be honest, I wasn't sure I was gonna be able to stand on stage and sing. Having @wtongi there to stand beside me helped me stay strong for my father. I love you brother. Thank you for being there for me, and for being there for my dad."
