= Carry You Home (James Blunt song) =

2008 single by James Blunt

Single by James Blunt

from the album All the Lost Souls
- Released: 14 March 2008
- Recorded: 2007
- Genre: Folk rock
- Length: 4:00 (album version); 3:51 (radio edit)
- Label: Atlantic
- Songwriters: James Blunt, Max Martin
- Producer: Tom Rothrock

James Blunt singles chronology
"Same Mistake" (2007)	"Carry You Home" (2008)	"I Really Want You" (2008)

"Carry You Home" is the third single from James Blunt's second studio album, All the Lost Souls. The single was released on 24 March 2008. The song peaked at No. 20 on the UK Singles Chart. The song had already debuted at No. 173 in September 2007, solely on download sales of All the Lost Souls. The single was Blunt's last release to be available on three different physical formats.

== Release ==
The single was released on three different physical formats. CD1 includes an exclusive live recording of "Young Folks", taken from the live lounge sessions on BBC Radio 1. CD2 includes a live version of "Same Mistake", recorded in Ibiza, as well as the video for "Carry You Home" and an exclusive live AOL video of "1973". The 7" single includes an exclusive live recording of "Wisemen", also recorded in Ibiza.

== Music video ==
The video for the song, shot entirely in black and white, shows the story of a man travelling to return personal belongings of a dead soldier to the soldier's wife. The video was filmed in Dorset, south-west England, and features scenes of Wareham railway station, houses and the valley in Swanage, the region around St. Aldhelm's Head and the twelfth-century St. Aldhelm's Chapel. The combat scene was shot at Bovington Camp, where Blunt had been stationed during his service in the British Army, and features soldiers from the camp.

== Track listings ==
CD1

1. "Carry You Home" (Radio Edit) – 3:51
2. "Young Folks" (Live From Radio 1) – 3:49

CD2

1. "Carry You Home" (Radio Edit) – 3:51
2. "Same Mistake" (Live in Ibiza) – 4:32
3. "Carry You Home" (Video) – 3:55
4. "1973" (AOL Session Video) – 4:38

7-inch vinyl

1. "Carry You Home" (Radio Edit) – 3:51
2. "Wisemen" (Live in Ibiza) – 4:15

== Charts ==
Chart (2007–08)	Peak position
Austria (Ö3 Austria Top 40)	50
Denmark (Tracklisten)	37
Germany (GfK)	43
Italy (FIMI)	21
Netherlands (Dutch Top 40 Tipparade)	13
Netherlands (Single Top 100)	75
Poland (Airplay Chart)	4
Scottish Singles Sales (Official Charts)	13
Switzerland (Schweizer Hitparade)	16
UK Singles (Official Charts)	20

== Certifications ==
Region	Certification	Certified units/sales
Denmark (IFPI Danmark)	Gold	7,500^{^}
Italy (FIMI) sales since 2009	Gold	35,000^{‡}
United Kingdom (BPI)	Silver	200,000^{‡}
^{^} Shipments figures based on certification alone.^{‡} Sales+streaming figures based on certification alone.
