= All the Lost Souls =

Studio album by James Blunt
- Released: 17 September 2007
- Recorded: October 2006 – July 2007
- Genres: Pop rock; folk rock
- Length: 38:29; 63:36 (Deluxe Version 2008)
- Labels: Atlantic, Custard
- Producers: Tom Rothrock, James Blunt

James Blunt chronology
Chasing Time: The Bedlam Sessions (2006)	All the Lost Souls (2007)	Some Kind of Trouble (2010)

Singles from All the Lost Souls
- 1. "1973" Released: 23 July 2007; 2. "Same Mistake" Released: 3 December 2007; 3. "Carry You Home" Released: 17 March 2008; 4. "I Really Want You" Released: 29 March 2008; 5. "Je réalise" Released: 28 February 2008; 6. "Love, Love, Love" Released: 17 November 2008; 7. "It Is My Song" Released: 2 January 2009

All the Lost Souls is the second studio album by English singer-songwriter James Blunt, released on 17 September 2007. It is the follow-up to his 2004 debut album, Back to Bedlam. The first single released from the album was "1973", which started radio play on 23 July 2007.

Several songs on the album were performed at live shows during Blunt's 2006 tours, including "1973", "I Really Want You", "Annie" and "I Can't Hear the Music". His touring band, consisting of Paul Beard (keyboards and vocals), Ben Castle (guitar and vocals), Malcolm Moore (bass guitar and vocals) and Karl Brazil (drums and percussion), backed Blunt on the new album. Tom Rothrock returns as producer; Rothrock also produced Back to Bedlam. Blunt also performed the song "Same Mistake" during his performance at the Live Earth concert in London. The album received mixed reviews, but peaked at number one in over 20 countries.

== Cover art ==
The cover consists of hundreds of pictures of Blunt (from childhood to recent) which forms a photomosaic of his face.

== Singles ==
The first single produced from the album was "1973". The single proved to become a massive hit, due to heavy airplay and satisfying sales. It performed below expectations in the US, peaking at number 73. On the UK Singles Chart, the song peaked at number four, despite being at number one on the Airplay charts. The second single taken from the album was "Same Mistake", which failed to chart in the US and had a differing successes in other countries, however, it was a major hit in many South American countries.

The third single released was "Carry You Home", which peaked at number 20 on the UK Singles Chart. The fourth and final single from the standard edition of the album, "I Really Want You", was only released as a promotional single, although a music video does exist. "Je réalise" was released as the first single from the deluxe edition of the album, exclusively in France. "Love, Love, Love" was released as the second single from the deluxe edition of the album, charting in many countries. "It Is My Song" was released as the third and final single from the deluxe edition of the album.

== Critical reception ==
Professional ratings
Aggregate scores
Source	Rating
Metacritic	53/100
Review scores
Source	Rating
AllMusic	3.5/5 stars
Digital Spy	3/5 stars
Entertainment Weekly	B+
The Guardian	2/5 stars
Rolling Stone	2.5/5 stars
About.com	4/5 stars
Billboard	Positive
Q	3/5 stars
The Observer	4/5 stars
NME	4/10

The album received mixed reviews from critics: At Metacritic, which assigns a normalised rating out of 100 to reviews from mainstream critics, the album has received an average score of 53 out of 100, which indicates "mixed or average reviews", based on 21 reviews. Kerri Mason, reviewing for Billboard, gave the album a positive review, saying that Blunt "shows the abandon and confidence of a long-term artist, not just a one-hit wonder". She continued "[he] still dwells on moody, introspective midtempos. In other words, he still adheres to the Gray template the second time around, but he opens things up slightly with some spacy textures reminiscent of Coldplay and a heavy dose of classic popcraft" and finished the review saying "This makes All the Lost Souls soothing, not haunting." Liz Hoggard of The Observer gave it four stars out of five and called it "a terrific album". She praised "the dissonant guitar chords to the curly-wurly typography on the album cover. The anthemic 'Shine On' is exquisitely crafted while 'I Can't Hear the Music' hooks into your brain with its James Bond-style orchestration" and finished saying "But snobbery apart, this is a terrific album."

NME was less impressed, saying, in a four out of ten review, that "Britain prayed James Blunt would retire, renounce music and go burn £50 notes for fun in his mansion...But he's only gone and come back. And improved, actually: we counted two more hits than Back to Bedlam." Mike Joseph of PopMatters also gave the album four out of ten, and said in part: "Not to say that this album is awful, but there's definitely something lacking here. Blunt's voice is quite the acquired taste, and nothing on here really stands out or connects from a thematic or lyrical standpoint. Nothing really hits the heart; it's all very precise and workmanlike."

== Chart performance ==
In Australia and Germany, All the Lost Souls is certified Platinum for shipping over 70,000 and 200,000 copies respectively. In Argentina, Australia, Canada, Estonia, France, Germany, Greece, Ireland, Italy and the UK, the album peaked at number one on the album charts.

== Track listings ==
- Standard edition
1. "1973" (James Blunt / Mark Batson) – 4:40
2. "One of the Brightest Stars" (James Blunt / Steve McEwan) – 3:11
3. "I'll Take Everything" (Blunt / Eg White) – 3:05
4. "Same Mistake" (Blunt) – 4:58
5. "Carry You Home" (Blunt / Max Martin) – 3:56
6. "Give Me Some Love" (Blunt) – 3:36
7. "I Really Want You" (Blunt) – 3:30
8. "Shine On" (Blunt) – 4:26
9. "Annie" (Blunt / Jimmy Hogarth) – 3:25
10. "I Can't Hear the Music" (Blunt) – 3:45
- Deluxe edition bonus tracks

11. "Love, Love, Love" (Blunt) – 3:58
12. "Cuz I Love You" (live) – 3:25
13. "Young Folks" (live) – 2:58
14. "Breakfast in America" (live Supertramp cover; Roger Hodgson) – 4:03

- Deluxe digital edition bonus tracks

15. "It Is My Song" (duet with Laura Pausini; Laura Pausini / Cheope / Daniel Vuletic / Blunt) – 3:28
16. "Je réalise" (duet with Sinik) – 3:28

- UK standard edition bonus DVD
1. "In the Studio with James Blunt"
2. "The Making of All the Lost Souls"
3. "1973" (video) – 4:15
4. "Return to Kosovo" (preview) – 2:18
- Australian tour edition bonus DVD
1. "Give Me Some Love" (live from The MAX Sessions, Sydney)
2. "I Really Want You" (live from The MAX Sessions, Sydney)
3. "So Long, Jimmy" (live from The MAX Sessions, Sydney)
4. "Carry You Home" (live from The MAX Sessions, Sydney)
5. "Wisemen" (live from The MAX Sessions, Sydney)
6. "Same Mistake" (live from The MAX Sessions, Sydney)
7. "1973" (live from The MAX Sessions, Sydney)
- American Target edition bonus DVD
1. "1973" (video) – 4:15
2. "1973" (making of the video) – 4:55
- Deluxe edition bonus DVD
1. "Same Mistake" (live at Abbey Road)
2. "I'll Take Everything" (live at Abbey Road)
3. "1973" (live at Abbey Road)
4. "You're Beautiful" (live in Paris)
5. "Goodbye My Lover" (live in Paris)
6. "Carry You Home" (live from the Sydney Opera House)
7. "Wisemen" (live in Ibiza)
8. "One of the Brightest Stars" (live in Ibiza)
9. "1973" (video)
10. "Same Mistake" (video)
11. "Carry You Home" (video)
12. "I Really Want You" (video)
13. "Je réalise" (video)
14. "1973" (the making of the video)
15. "Same Mistake" (the making of the video)
16. "Carry You Home" (the making of the video)
17. "I Really Want You" (the making of the video)
18. "Return to Kosovo" (documentary)
19. "T5M Interview Special"

== Charts ==
=== Weekly charts ===
Chart (2007–11)	Peak position
Australian Albums (ARIA)	1
Austrian Albums (Ö3 Austria)	1
Belgian Albums (Ultratop Flanders)	4
Belgian Albums (Ultratop Wallonia)	1
Canadian Albums (Billboard)	1
Danish Albums (Hitlisten)	5
Dutch Albums (Album Top 100)	2
European Albums (Billboard)	1
Finnish Albums (Suomen virallinen lista)	10
French Albums (SNEP)	1
German Albums (Offizielle Top 100)	1
Greek Albums (IFPI Greece)	1
Hungarian Albums (MAHASZ)	6
Irish Albums (IRMA)	1
Italian Albums (FIMI)	1
Japanese Albums (Oricon)	26
Mexican Albums (Top 100 Mexico)	19
New Zealand Albums (RMNZ)	1
Norwegian Albums (VG-lista)	3
Portuguese Albums (AFP)	9
South African Albums (RISA)	2
Spanish Albums (Promusicae)	13
Swedish Albums (Sverigetopplistan)	2
Swiss Albums (Schweizer Hitparade)	1
Taiwanese Albums (Five Music)	1
UK Albums (Official Charts)	1
US Billboard 200	7

=== Year-end charts ===
Chart (2007)	Position
Australian Albums (ARIA)	26
Austrian Albums (Ö3 Austria)	21
Belgian Albums (Ultratop Flanders)	81
Belgian Albums (Ultratop Wallonia)	21
Dutch Albums (Album Top 100)	35
European Albums (Billboard)	8
French Albums (SNEP)	13
German Albums (Offizielle Top 100)	16
Italian Albums (FIMI)	40
New Zealand Albums (RMNZ)	21
Swedish Albums (Sverigetopplistan)	47
Swiss Albums (Schweizer Hitparade)	2
UK Albums (OCC)	13

Chart (2008)	Position
Austrian Albums (Ö3 Austria)	24
Belgian Albums (Ultratop Wallonia)	20
Dutch Albums (Album Top 100)	78
European Albums (Billboard)	11
French Albums (SNEP)	32
German Albums (Offizielle Top 100)	21
Italian Albums (FIMI)	67
Swiss Albums (Schweizer Hitparade)	18
UK Albums (OCC)	82

== Certifications and sales ==
Region	Certification	Certified units/sales
Argentina (CAPIF)	Platinum	40,000^{^}
Australia (ARIA)	Platinum	70,000^{^}
Austria (IFPI Austria)	Platinum	20,000^{*}
Belgium (BRMA)	Platinum	30,000^{*}
Canada (Music Canada)	2× Platinum	200,000^{^}
Denmark (IFPI Danmark)	Platinum	30,000^{^}
France (SNEP)	Diamond	500,000^{*}
Germany (BVMI)	2× Platinum	400,000^{^}
Greece (IFPI Greece)	Gold	7,500^{^}
Ireland (IRMA)	3× Platinum	45,000^{^}
Italy (FIMI) sales since 2009	Gold	25,000^{‡}
Japan (RIAJ)	Gold	100,000^{^}
Netherlands (NVPI)	Gold	35,000^{^}
New Zealand (RMNZ)	Platinum	15,000^{^}
Poland (ZPAV)	Gold	10,000^{*}
Portugal (AFP)	Gold	10,000^{^}
Sweden (GLF)	Gold	20,000^{^}
Switzerland (IFPI Switzerland)	3× Platinum	90,000^{^}
United Kingdom (BPI)	3× Platinum	974,259
United States (RIAA)	Gold	500,000^{^}
Summaries
Europe (IFPI)	2× Platinum	2,000,000^{*}
^{*} Sales figures based on certification alone.^{^} Shipments figures based on certification alone.^{‡} Sales+streaming figures based on certification alone.
