= I Really Want You =

Single by James Blunt

from the album All the Lost Souls
- Released: 4 August 2008
- Recorded: 2007
- Genre: Pop
- Length: 3:30
- Label: Atlantic
- Songwriter: James Blunt
- Producer: Tom Rothrock

James Blunt singles chronology
"Carry You Home" (2008)	"I Really Want You" (2008)	"Love, Love, Love" (2008)

"I Really Want You" is the third single taken from singer-songwriter James Blunt's second studio album, All the Lost Souls. The single was released on 4 August 2008. "I Really Want You" was released as a digital download single only, with a physical release being limited to promotional radio only. The single peaked at number 171 on the UK Singles Chart. It was also the last single to be taken from the standard version of the album.

== Music video ==
The video was directed by Jim Canty, and was shot at an ex-Ministry of Defence site, located in Longcross, Chertsey. The site was also used for the filming of BBC drama HolbyBlue. The music video features people miming the song whilst sitting outside on the ground at night, as their clothes gradually change from light to dark shades, then back to light again. Blunt appears every so often as one of the people singing the song.

== Track listings ==
1. "I Really Want You" - 3:30

== Charts ==
=== Weekly charts ===
Chart (2007–08)	Peak position
Canada Hot 100 (Billboard)	75
Italy (FIMI)	50
UK Singles Chart	171

=== Year-end charts ===
Year-end chart performance for "I Really Want You"
Chart (2012)	Position
Ukraine Airplay (TopHit)	195
