= 1973 (song) =

2007 single by James Blunt

Single by James Blunt

from the album All the Lost Souls
- Released: 23 July 2007
- Genre: Pop rock
- Length: 4:42
- Label: Atlantic
- Songwriters: James Blunt, Mark Batson
- Producer: Tom Rothrock

James Blunt singles chronology
"Wisemen" (2006)	"1973" (2007)	"Same Mistake" (2007)

"1973" is a song by English recording artist James Blunt. It was released as the lead single from his second studio album, All the Lost Souls (2007).

First performed by James Blunt during his autumn 2006 North American tour, "1973" was released for radio play on 23 July 2007, to selected radio stations around the world. It was made available for download exclusively from the Verizon Wireless network in the United States on the same date. Starting on 7 August 2007, the song was made widely available for digital download, with physical releases being made available from 3 September 2007. The single peaked at number four on the UK Singles Chart.

== Background ==
"1973" was written by James Blunt and Mark Batson. "He was trying to write an English singer-songwriter song, and I was trying the Dr. Dre end of the scale", says Blunt. The song was inspired by the club scene in Ibiza, where Blunt maintains a residence and enjoys the social scene. The song has been remixed by Pete Tong and Dave Spoon as part of their Ibiza 2007 Remix Project, and Tong started playing the remix in July 2007 when acting as DJ at Pacha, the Ibiza club that inspired the song and opened in 1973.

The lyrics include references to a few American popular songs: "As Time Goes By", written in 1931 by Herman Hupfeld and popularised by Dooley Wilson playing the character of 'Sam' in the 1942 film Casablanca; "It's the Same Old Song", written by the legendary songwriting team Holland–Dozier–Holland and recorded in 1965 on the Motown label by the Four Tops; "Here We Go Again", popularised in 1967 by Ray Charles and re-popularized as a duet with Norah Jones upon the 2005 posthumous release of Charles' masterwork album, Genius Loves Company, and; "I Can See Clearly Now", written and recorded by Johnny Nash, a song which spent November at the No. 1 spot of the Billboard Hot 100 in 1972.

== Release ==
The single was released on three physical formats. CD1 features a brand new track, "Dear Katie", which was written by Blunt's long-time keyboardist Paul Beard. Beard also provides backing vocals for the song. CD2 includes a live version of "Annie", the video for "1973", plus a further new track, "So Happy", which was written by Felix Howard and Blunt. The 7" vinyl also includes "So Happy".

== Music video ==
The video (directed by Paul R. Brown), in which a modern-day Blunt strolls among '70s street scenes, reflects the song's nostalgic tone. "The '70s sound like they were a time of excess and great flamboyance", he says, "but a sense of fun as well." The video was shot in the Universal Studios Lot in Los Angeles.

== Track listings ==
CD 1

1. "1973" – 4:44
2. "Dear Katie" – 2:20

CD 2

1. "1973" – 4:44
2. "Annie" (Live from The Garden Shed) – 3:26
3. "So Happy" – 3:36
4. "1973" (video) – 3:58

7" vinyl

1. "1973" – 4:44
2. "So Happy" – 3:36

== Reception ==
Billboard reviewer Chuck Taylor said that the song's "[m]idtempo pacing" resembles 10,000 Maniacs's "Trouble Me", a song from the band's 1989 album Blind Man's Zoo.

== Chart performance ==
The song debuted at number 10 on the UK Singles Chart, then peaked at number four, making it Blunt's third top 10 single and his fifth-released single debuting in the UK Singles Chart. In Switzerland, the song debuted at number one, making it his second top 10 hit, and also reached number one in Venezuela, Austria, the Wallonia region of Belgium, Slovakia, and Turkey.

In the United States, the song first appeared on the Billboard Bubbling Under Hot 100 Singles, where it peaked at number two. After the song's parent album All the Lost Souls was released on 14 September 2007, the song debuted and peaked at number 73 on the Billboard Hot 100 the week of 6 October 2007, spending just three consecutive weeks on the chart before exiting at number 100. The song peaked at number 60 on the Pop 100. From number 86, the song made a jump to number two on Billboard's Eurochart Hot 100 Singles, then peaked at number one on 29 September and 6 October 2007.

=== Weekly charts ===
Weekly sales chart performance of "1973"
Chart (2007–08)	Peak position
Australia (ARIA)	11
Austria (Ö3 Austria Top 40)	1
Belgium (Ultratop 50 Flanders)	3
Belgium (Ultratop 50 Wallonia)	1
Canada Hot 100 (Billboard)	13
Canada AC (Billboard)	1
Canada CHR/Top 40 (Billboard)	47
Canada Hot AC (Billboard)	12
Czech Republic Airplay (ČNS IFPI)	6
Denmark (Tracklisten)	9
Europe (Eurochart Hot 100)	1
Finland (Suomen virallinen lista)	11
Germany (GfK)	2
Germany Airplay (BVMI)	1
Hungary (Rádiós Top 40)	11
Ireland (IRMA)	5
Italy (FIMI)	2
Netherlands (Dutch Top 40)	8
Netherlands (Single Top 100)	3
New Zealand (Recorded Music NZ)	9
Norway (VG-lista)	7
Poland (Polish Airplay Charts)	3
Romania (Romanian Top 100)	21
Scottish Singles Sales (Official Charts)	3
Slovakia Airplay (ČNS IFPI)	1
Sweden (Sverigetopplistan)	7
Switzerland (Schweizer Hitparade)	1
Turkish Top 20 Chart	1
UK Singles (Official Charts)	4
US Billboard Hot 100	73
US Adult Alternative Airplay (Billboard)	5
US Adult Pop Airplay (Billboard)	18
US Pop 100 (Billboard)	60
Venezuela Pop Rock (Record Report)	1

=== Year-end charts ===
2007 annual sales chart performance of "1973"
Chart (2007)	Position
Australia (ARIA)	76
Austria (Ö3 Austria Top 40)	18
Belgium (Ultratop 50 Flanders)	46
Belgium (Ultratop 50 Wallonia)	18
Brazil (Crowley)	48
Europe (Eurochart Hot 100)	13
Germany (Official German Charts)	17
Italy (FIMI)	24
Netherlands (Dutch Top 40)	28
Netherlands (Single Top 100)	23
Sweden (Sverigetopplistan)	73
Switzerland (Schweizer Hitparade)	7
UK Singles (OCC)	52

2008 annual sales chart performance of "1973"
Chart (2008)	Position
Belgium (Ultratop 50 Wallonia)	50
Germany (Official German Charts)	97
Switzerland (Schweizer Hitparade)	64

== Certifications and sales ==
Sales certifications for "1973"
Region	Certification	Certified units/sales
Austria (IFPI Austria)	Gold	15,000^{*}
Belgium (BRMA)	Gold	25,000^{*}
Denmark (IFPI Danmark)	Gold	7,500^{^}
Germany (BVMI)	Gold	150,000^{^}
Italy	—	19,464
Italy (FIMI) Sales since 2009	Gold	25,000^{‡}
New Zealand (RMNZ)	2× Platinum	60,000^{‡}
Spain (Promusicae)	Platinum	60,000^{‡}
United Kingdom (BPI)	Platinum	600,000^{‡}
^{*} Sales figures based on certification alone.^{^} Shipments figures based on certification alone.^{‡} Sales+streaming figures based on certification alone.
