= Once Upon a Mind =

Studio album by James Blunt
- Released: 25 October 2019
- Genres: Pop; folk-pop
- Length: 36:52
- Label: Atlantic UK
- Producer: Steve Robson

James Blunt chronology
The Afterlove (2017)	Once Upon a Mind (2019)	The Stars Beneath My Feet (2004–2021) (2021)

Singles from Once Upon a Mind
- 1. "Cold" Released: 29 August 2019; 2. "Champions" Released: 4 October 2019; 3. "I Told You" Released: 11 October 2019; 4. "Monsters" Released: 18 October 2019; 5. "Halfway" Released: 5 February 2020

Professional ratings
Review scores
Source	Rating
AllMusic	3/5 stars

Once Upon a Mind is the sixth studio album by English singer James Blunt, released on 25 October 2019 through Atlantic Records. Blunt was due to embark on the Once Upon a Mind Tour in 2021. A deluxe version of the album – the Time Suspended Edition – was released on 26 June 2020, featuring two new demo songs and six acoustic tracks.

== Singles ==
The first single from the album, "Cold", was released on 29 August 2019. The video was then released on 9 September 2019.

== Track listing ==
Once Upon a Mind standard version track listing
No.	Title	Writer(s)	Producer(s)	Length
1.	"The Truth"	James Blunt; Cleo Tighe; Steve Robson	Robson; Mike Wise^{[b]}	3:42
2.	"Cold"	Blunt; Tighe; Robson	Robson; Mike Wise^{[b]}	3:28
3.	"Champions"	Blunt; Maureen McDonald; Daniel Parker; Mark Crew; Daniel Priddy	Crew; Priddy	3:14
4.	"Monsters"	Blunt; Amy Wadge; Jimmy Hogarth	Hogarth	4:19
5.	"Youngster"	Blunt; Charlie Diamond; Martin Luke Brown; Parker; Thomas Barnes; Peter Kelleher; Benjamin Kohn; Samuel Klempner	TMS; Klempner	3:19
6.	"5 Miles"	Blunt; Philip Plested; Barnes; Kelleher; Kohn; Matthew Prime	TMS; Matt Prime^{[b]}	3:19
7.	"How It Feels to Be Alive"	Blunt; Tighe; Wayne Hector; Robson	Robson	3:25
8.	"I Told You"	Blunt; Andrew Jackson; Crew	Crew	2:31
9.	"Halfway" (featuring Ward Thomas)	Blunt; Tighe; Barnes; Kelleher; Kohn	TMS	3:11
10.	"Stop the Clock"	Blunt; Tighe; Hector; Robson	Robson	3:14
11.	"The Greatest"	Blunt; Nathaniel Cyphert; Robson	Robson	3:10
Total length:				36:52

Once Upon a Mind Time Suspended Edition bonus tracks
No.	Title	Writer(s)	Length
12.	"Should I Give It All Up" (demo)	James Blunt; Daniel Parker	3:27
13.	"Happier" (demo)	Blunt; Nate Cyphert; Steve Robson	3:03
14.	"The Truth" (acoustic)	Blunt; Cleo Tighe; Robson	3:50
15.	"Cold" (acoustic)	Blunt; Tighe; Robson	3:40
16.	"Champions" (acoustic)	Blunt; Maureen McDonald; Parker; Mark Crew; Daniel Priddy	3:21
17.	"Monsters" (acoustic)	Blunt; Amy Wadge; Jimmy Hogarth	4:22
18.	"5 Miles" (acoustic)	Blunt; Philip Plested; Barnes; Kelleher; Kohn; Matthew Prime	3:17
19.	"Halfway" (acoustic)	Blunt; Tighe; Barnes; Kelleher; Kohn	3:17

== Personnel ==
- James Blunt – vocals, composer
- Steve Robson – guitar, organ, piano, programming, producer
- Matt Zara – guitar, programming
- John Garrison – bass
- Karl Brazil – drums
- Nate Cyphert – background vocals, composer
- Sam Miller – engineer
- Jorge Arango Kure – engineer
- Mike Tarantino – editing
- Brian D. Willis – editing
- Tom Rothrock – mixing
- Chris Cehringer – mastering
- Gavin Bond – photography

== Charts ==
=== Weekly charts ===
Weekly chart performance for Once Upon a Mind
Chart (2019–20)	Peak position
Australian Albums (ARIA)	5
Austrian Albums (Ö3 Austria)	6
Belgian Albums (Ultratop Flanders)	61
Belgian Albums (Ultratop Wallonia)	15
Canadian Albums (Billboard)	40
Czech Albums (ČNS IFPI)	44
Dutch Albums (Album Top 100)	29
French Albums (SNEP)	26
German Albums (Offizielle Top 100)	8
Hungarian Albums (MAHASZ)	4
Irish Albums (IRMA)	38
Italian Albums (FIMI)	31
New Zealand Albums (RMNZ)	16
Portuguese Albums (AFP)	47
Scottish Albums (Official Charts)	2
Slovak Albums (ČNS IFPI)	34
Spanish Albums (Promusicae)	34
Swiss Albums (Schweizer Hitparade)	4
UK Albums (Official Charts)	3
US Top Album Sales (Billboard)	71

=== Year-end charts ===
Year-end chart performance for Once Upon a Mind
Chart (2019)	Position
French Albums (SNEP)	194
Swiss Albums (Schweizer Hitparade)	74

== Certifications ==
Region	Certification	Certified units/sales
United Kingdom (BPI)	Gold	100,000^{‡}
^{‡} Sales+streaming figures based on certification alone.
