= Same Mistake =

Single by James Blunt

from the album All the Lost Souls and P.S. I Love You (Music from the Motion Picture)
- B-side: "One of the Brightest Stars" (Live From The Garden Shed)
- Released: 3 December 2007
- Recorded: 2007
- Genre: Folk rock, soft rock
- Length: 4:59 (album version); 3:56 (radio edit)
- Label: Atlantic
- Songwriter: James Blunt
- Producer: Tom Rothrock

James Blunt singles chronology
"1973" (2007)	"Same Mistake" (2007)	"Carry You Home" (2008)

"Same Mistake" is the second single from James Blunt's second studio album, All the Lost Souls. The song was released to radio on 1 November 2007, before being officially released on 3 December 2007. The song was heavily edited for radio play.

== Release ==
The single was released on three different physical formats. CD1 features the album version of "Same Mistake", plus an additional OpenDisc feature which allows users to access and download a free mp3 of the acoustic version. CD2 features an Ashley Beedle Remix of "1973", a live version of "One of the Brighest Stars", and the video for "Same Mistake". The 7" Vinyl features the live version of "One of the Brighest Stars".

== Music video ==
The video for "Same Mistake" was filmed in Toronto, Ontario, Canada on 5 October 2007. It was directed by Jonas Åkerlund, who is well known for his work with artists such as Madonna and Christina Aguilera. The video uses a filming technique called snorricam where the camera is attached to a frame worn on Blunt's upper torso and is focused on his face throughout the entire video. It was released on 1 November 2007 on the website of The Sun, a British tabloid-style newspaper, and on MSN. The camera "follows" Blunt through a day in his life, from awakening with a beautiful young woman beside him, through his morning ablutions and breakfast, strolling his neighbourhood, meeting up with friends, appearing to hold up a convenience store and taking off in the back of a Jeep, eventually arriving at a club. At the club, Blunt becomes the focus of attention of numerous women, although his reaction appears to be zombie-like. Eventually he leaves the club, and returns home with one of the women. They make love, although Blunt appears detached and bored. The video ends with Blunt singing "where did I go wrong?" and falling asleep.

== Track listings ==
CD1

1. "Same Mistake" - 4:59
2. "OpenDisc Feature" (Includes "Same Mistake" Acoustic Version) - 4:15

CD2

1. "Same Mistake" - 4:59
2. "1973" (Ashley Beedle Remix) - 6:34
3. "One of the Brightest Stars" (Live From The Garden Shed) - 3:00
4. "Same Mistake" (Video) - 3:58

7" Vinyl

1. "Same Mistake" - 4:59
2. "One of the Brightest Stars" (Live From The Garden Shed) - 3:00

== Charts ==
=== Weekly charts ===
Chart (2007–2008)	Peak position
Austria (Ö3 Austria Top 40)	12
Belgium (Ultratip Bubbling Under Flanders)	3
Belgium (Ultratip Bubbling Under Wallonia)	3
Canada Hot 100 (Billboard)	69
Czech Republic Airplay (ČNS IFPI)	72
Denmark (Tracklisten)	26
European Hot 100 Singles (Billboard)	69
Germany (GfK)	27
Italy (FIMI)	19
Netherlands (Dutch Top 40)	29
Netherlands (Single Top 100)	48
Portugal Digital Songs (Billboard)	9
Sweden (Sverigetopplistan)	25
Switzerland (Schweizer Hitparade)	21
UK Singles (Official Charts)	57
US Adult Pop Airplay (Billboard)	32

=== Year-end charts ===
Chart (2008)	Position
Austria (Ö3 Austria Top 40)	61
Brazil (Crowley)	4
Switzerland (Schweizer Hitparade)	90

== In other media ==
- The song has been used in several TV shows including Private Practice and Las Vegas. It also was played during the trailer and end credits of the film P.S. I Love You.
- The song was the soundtrack of Maria Paula (Marjorie Estiano) and Marconi Ferraço (Dalton Vigh) in the Brazilian telenovela Duas Caras.
- The Spanish flamenco-pop singer Melendi covered the song, which is included on the bonus CD of his album Mas Curiosa la cara de tu Padre.
