= Sinik =

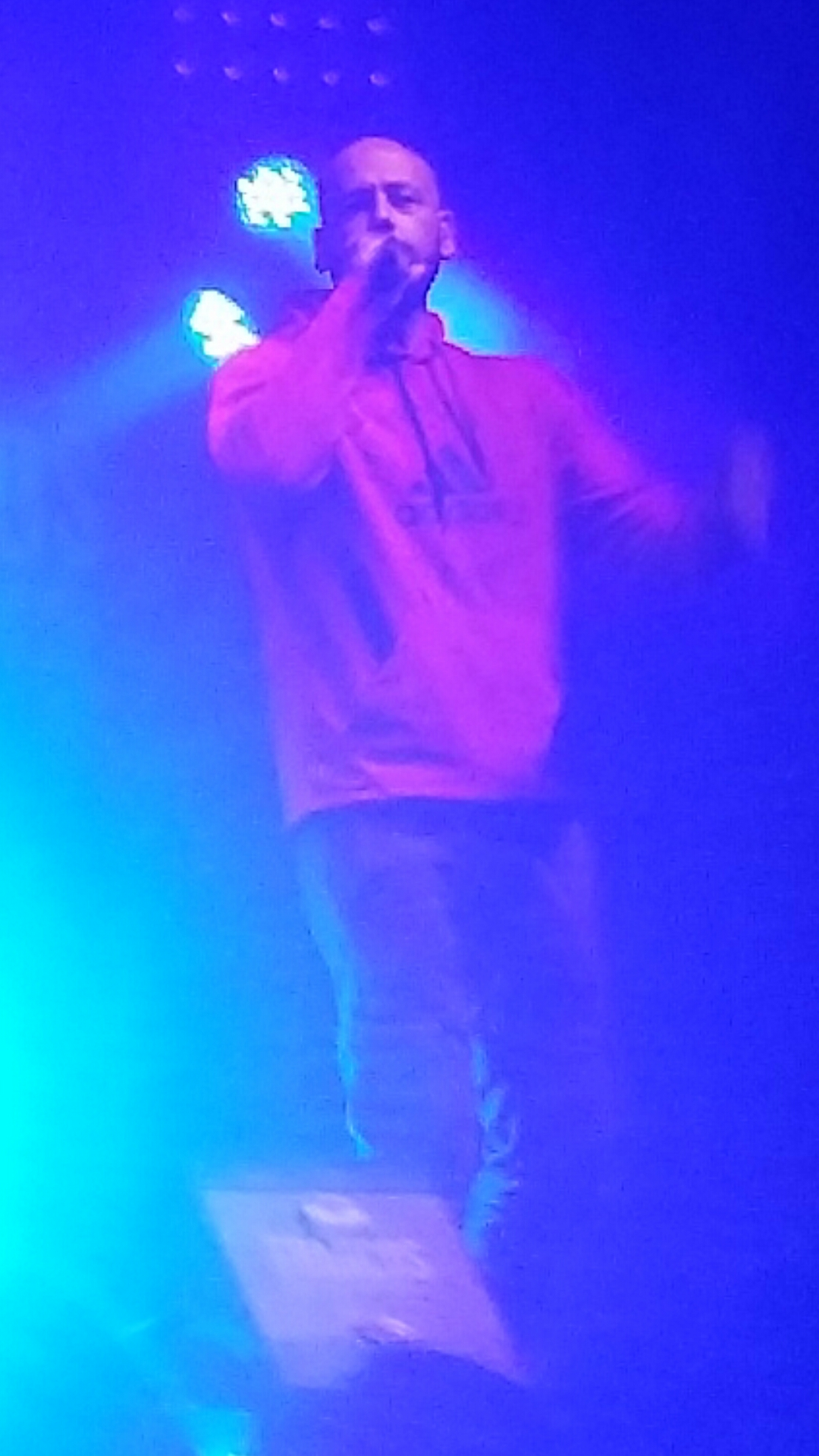

Background information
- Also known as: Malsain l'Assassin; S.I.N.I.K.
- Born: Thomas Gérard Idir; 26 June 1980 (age 45); Paris, France
- Genres: French rap, hardcore rap
- Occupation: Rapper
- Years active: 1996–2022
- Label: 6-0-9 (Six-O-Nine)
- Website: sinik609.com

Thomas Gérard Idir (French pronunciation: [tɔmɑ ʒeʁaʁ idiʁ]; born 26 June 1980), better known by his stage name Sinik (sometimes spelled as S.I.N.I.K.), is a French-language rapper. He is also known as Malsain ("Unhealthy") and L'assassin ("The Murderer"). His father is Algerian while his mother is French. In 2001, he founded his label Six o Nine (6–0–9).

== Collaborations / Feuds ==
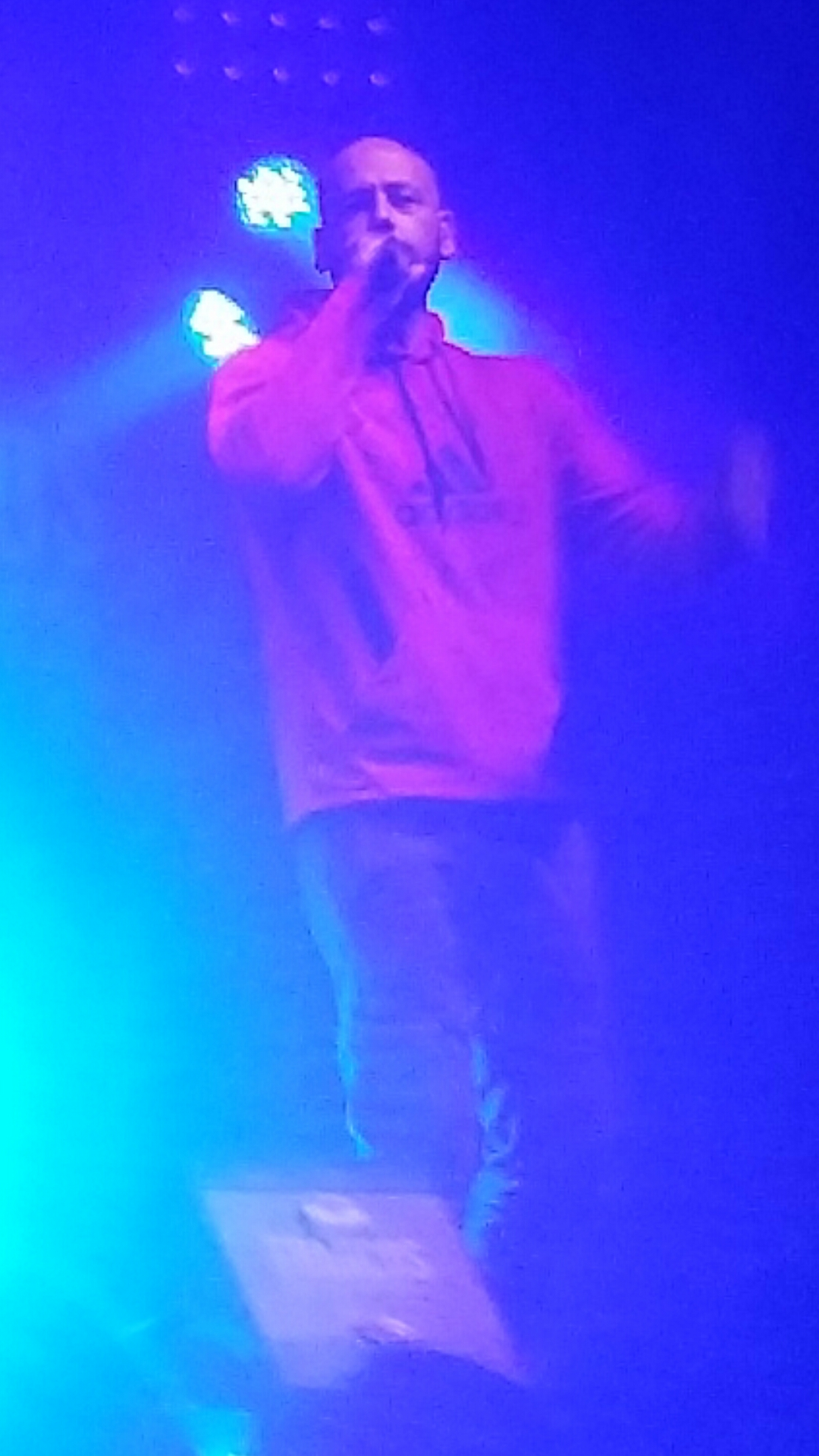
Sinik in Montréal, Québec, Canada at thé 2019 Francos Festival.

His meeting with Diam's at 14 was the turning point of his career. They consider themselves as brother and sister.

Le Toit du Monde, released in 2007, contains a song called "Je réalise" which features British singer songwriter, James Blunt. The single is bilingual, with English parts performed by Blunt and French parts by Sinik.

He is also notorious for a number of feuds with other rap artists, most notably Kizito, Booba and Gaiden

== Discography ==
=== Albums ===
Year	Album	Record label	Peak positions			Certifications
Year	Album	Record label	FR	BEL (Wa)	SWI	Certifications
2005	La Main sur le coeur	Warner	3	78	47	SNEP: 2× Gold
2006	Sang froid	Warner	2	5	11	SNEP: Platinum
2007	Le Toit du monde	Warner	5	20	34	SNEP: 2× Gold
2009	Ballon d'or	6–0–9	19	40	—	SNEP: Gold
2012	La plume et le poignard	6–0–9	11	23	81	SNEP: Gold
2015	Immortel II		5	49	—	SNEP: Gold
2017	Drône		108	—	—	
2019	Invincible		26	40	—	
2022	Niksi		28	126	—	

=== Mixtapes ===
Year	Album	Peak positions			Certifications / Sales
Year	Album	FR	BEL (Wa)	SWI	Certifications / Sales
2004	En attendant l'album	—	—	—	40,000 copies
2011	Le Côté malsain	8	29	—	40,000 copies

=== Other releases ===
Mixtapes

- 1999: Ul'Team At Home 1er Volet (Mixtape Ul'Team Atom)
- 2011: Immortel (Best of de Sinik )

Maxis'

- 2000: Malsain
- 2002: Artiste triste

=== Singles ===
Year	Single	Peak positions			Album
Year	Single	FR	BEL (Wa)	SWI	Album
2006	"Ne dis jamais" (feat. Vitaa)	26	38	70	Sang froid
2006	"La cité des anges"	36	—	—	Sang froid
2008	"Je réalise" (feat. James Blunt)	3	11	38	Le Toit du monde
2008	"Bienvenue chez les Bylkas" (feat Big Ali & Cheb Bilal)		3	_	Rai N'B Fever 3
2012	"Les 16 vérités" (feat. Médine)	143	—	—	La plume et le poignard
2015	"Contradictions"	148	—	—	Immortel II
2017	"De Marbre"	120	—	—	

== See also ==
- Willy Denzey
- Sidney Duteil
- Abd al Malik (rapper)
