= Eg White =

British musician and record producer

- Born: Francis Anthony White; 22 November 1966 (age 59)
- Genres: Pop; rock
- Occupations: Musician; songwriter; producer
- Instrument: Bass
- Years active: 1984–present

Francis Anthony "Eg" White (born 22 November 1966) is a British musician, songwriter and producer. He started his career in the cowpunk band Yip Yip Coyote in the 1980s and then formed Brother Beyond with his brother, David White, in the late 1980s. In 1990, Eg White recorded the pop album 24 Years of Hunger, and then in 1992 he produced the debut, self-titled album by Kinky Machine.

He turned to songwriting in 1997, winning the Ivor Novello Award for Best Song Musically and Lyrically in 2004. In 2008 White worked with Adele on three tracks. In 2009 White was awarded his second Ivor Novello Award for 'Songwriter of the Year' and in 2010 he had a second UK number 1 with the Diana Vickers single "Once", a song he wrote with Cathy Dennis. White started his own record label in 2009. In 2024, White won his third Ivor Novello award.

== Career ==
Eg White started his career in the band Yip Yip Coyote and then formed Brother Beyond with his brother, David White, in the late 1980s, leaving the latter when they became involved with the songwriting team of Stock, Aitken and Waterman, just prior to their chart successes.

In 1990, Eg White collaborated with London model and BMX champion Alice Temple to record the pop album 24 Years of Hunger, which was released in 1991 under the name Eg and Alice and failed to chart. Lack of commercial success did not deter the taste-makers, however, and 24 Years of Hunger was described by Allmusic as "one of the finest, most refined and fully realized recordings of the era, employing a much more sophisticated and romantic style than anything else out of England at the time".

In 1992, White produced the debut, self-titled album by Kinky Machine, then disappeared from the music industry until 1996 when he released his debut solo album Turn Me On, I'm a Rocket Man, which was unsuccessful.

He turned to songwriting in 1997, providing instrumentation for the sessions of Suggs' solo album The Three Pyramids Club, but it was in 1999 that his career began to take off as a songwriter, musician and producer. His collaborative relationship with Alice Temple continued, the results of which can be heard on her solo debut album Hang Over. He also worked with Icelandic-Italian singer Emiliana Torrini on her debut album Love in the Time of Science and produced British singer-songwriter Mark Abis' album Changing Inside.

White's song "Leave Right Now" was recorded by Will Young in 2003, and reached number 1 in the UK Singles Chart. In recognition, White won the Ivor Novello Award for Best Song Musically and Lyrically in 2004. He has since enjoyed chart success with acts including Duffy, James Morrison and Joss Stone.

In 2008, White worked with Adele on three tracks which appeared on her first album 19, including the second single "Chasing Pavements".

In 2009, White was awarded his second Ivor Novello Award for 'Songwriter of the Year', and in 2010 he had a second UK number 1 with the Diana Vickers single "Once", a song he wrote with Cathy Dennis. Also in 2010, White reprised his collaborative role with Adele, and with her wrote "Take It All", which appears on her number one album 21.

White started his own record label imprint, Spilt Milk Records, in 2009 – making Lauren Pritchard its first signing, and then signing an exclusive license deal with Island Records to release the album Wasted in Jackson in 2010. The album features collaborations with White, Ed Harcourt and Marcus Mumford (of the band Mumford & Sons). He signed a recording contract with Parlophone Records and released a second album entitled Adventure Man on 18 May 2009.

In 2024, White won his third Ivor Novello award (this time for "Best Song Musically and Lyrically", his second in that category), alongside Jonny Lattimer and Victoria Canal, for Canal's song 'Black Swan'.

White has worked with Adele, Kylie Minogue, Lennon Stella, Natalie Imbruglia, Florence and the Machine, Dua Lipa, Tom Odell, Sam Smith, Will Young, James Morrison, Linkin Park, Pink, Joss Stone, Matt Cardle, Maverick Sabre and Rebecca Ferguson.

== Songwriting and production ==
Title	Year	Artist	Album	Songwriter	Producer
"Last Train"	1984	Yip Yip Coyote	Non-album single	check	
"I Should Have Lied"	1986	Brother Beyond	Get Even	check	
"Say Hello"	1990	Breathe	Peace of Mind	check	
"I Hear You're Doing Fine"	1990	Breathe	Peace of Mind	check	
"Will the Circle Be Unbroken?"	1990	Breathe	Peace of Mind	check	
"Got to Get By"	1990	Breathe	Peace of Mind	check	
"Shockaholic"	1993	Kinky Machine	Kinky Machine		check
"Candy Deceit"	1993	Kinky Machine	Kinky Machine		check
"Monkey on a String"	1993	Kinky Machine	Kinky Machine		check
"Glitter Bullets"	1993	Kinky Machine	Kinky Machine		check
"Clever?"	1993	Kinky Machine	Kinky Machine		check
"Sister Magpie"	1993	Kinky Machine	Kinky Machine		check
"Blue Polythene"	1993	Kinky Machine	Kinky Machine		check
"10 Second Bionic Man"	1994	Kinky Machine	Bent		check
"Cut It Down"	1994	Kinky Machine	Bent		check
"Gooseberry Fool"	1994	Kinky Machine	Bent		check
"Dolly Mixture Kid"	1994	Kinky Machine	Bent		check
"Nosebleed"	1994	Kinky Machine	Bent		check
"Lounge Dummy"	1994	Kinky Machine	Bent		check
"Pissing in the Snow"	1994	Kinky Machine	Bent		check
"Alsatians"	1994	Kinky Machine	Bent		check
"Wet Cigarettes"	1994	Kinky Machine	Bent		check
"Christopher"	1994	Kinky Machine	Bent		check
"Chemical Lobby"	1994	Kinky Machine	Bent		check
"Last Song"	1994	Kinky Machine	Bent		check
"Chained"	1998	Richie Sambora	Undiscovered Soul	check	
"Same Again"	1998	Suggs	Non-album single		check
"Dead Things"	1999	Emiliana Torrini	Love in the Time of Science	check	
"To Be Free"	1999	Emiliana Torrini	Love in the Time of Science	check	
"Unemployed in Summertime"	1999	Emiliana Torrini	Love in the Time of Science	check	
"Easy"	1999	Emiliana Torrini	Love in the Time of Science	check	
"Fingertips"	1999	Emiliana Torrini	Love in the Time of Science	check	
"Tuna Fish"	1999	Emiliana Torrini	Love in the Time of Science	check	
"Sea People"	1999	Emiliana Torrini	Love in the Time of Science	check	check
"Nothing Else on Her Mind"	2001	Slippry Feet	Freak Time Viewing	check	
"You Might Be Wrong"	2001	Nicole Russo	Through Your Eyes	check	check
"Slowly Walk Away"	2001	Nicole Russo	Through Your Eyes	check	
"Better Day"	2001	Nicole Russo	Through Your Eyes	check	check
"How D'ya Think She'd Feel About It"	2001	Nicole Russo	Through Your Eyes	check	check
"Through My Eyes"	2001	Nicole Russo	Through Your Eyes	check	check
"Stride On"	2001	Nicole Russo	Through Your Eyes		check
"Don't Wanna Let You Go"	2001	Nicole Russo	Through Your Eyes	check	
"Phoney"	2001	Nicole Russo	Through Your Eyes	check	
"Stop Trying To"	2001	Nicole Russo	Through Your Eyes	check	check
"Nice n' Easy"	2001	Nicole Russo	Through Your Eyes	check	check
"Say It"	2002	Alison Moyet	Hometime	check	
"Sugarhigh"	2002	Jade Anderson	Dive Deeper		check
"Promises"	2003	Baz	Psychedelic Love	check	
"Surrender (Your Love)"	2003	Javine	Surrender	check	check
"Leave Right Now"	2003	Will Young	Friday's Child	check	
"Going My Way"	2003	Will Young	Friday's Child	check	check
"Out of My Mind"	2003	Will Young	Friday's Child	check	
"Legend"	2004	Tamyra Gray	The Dreamer	check	
"U've Only Got 1"	2004	Tamyra Gray	The Dreamer	check	
"Promise"	2004	Javine	Surrender	check	check
"Millions"	2004	Javine	Surrender	check	check
"Think Twice"	2004	Javine	Surrender	check	check
"Messin'"	2004	Javine	Surrender	check	check
"Missing You"	2004	Javine	Surrender	check	check
"How Do You Think"	2004	The Brand New Heavies	Allabouthefunk	check	
"Fisherman's Woman"	2005	Emiliana Torrini	Fisherman's Woman	check	
"Shiver"	2005	Natalie Imbruglia	Counting Down the Days	check	
"Slow Down"	2005	Natalie Imbruglia	Counting Down the Days	check	check
"The Message"	2005	Nate James	Set the Tone	check	check
"Universal"	2005	Nate James	Set the Tone	check	check
"Call My Name"	2005	Charlotte Church	Tissues and Issues	check	check
"Crazy Stranger" (with Harel Shachal)	2005	Nicklodemus	Non-album single	check	
"Baby I'm a Fool"	2005	Jo O'Meara	Relentless	check	check
"Keep On"	2005	Will Young	Keep On	check	
"Who Am I"	2005	Will Young	Keep On	check	
"Save Yourself"	2005	Will Young	Keep On	check	
"Think About It"	2005	Will Young	Keep On	check	
"Give In"	2006	Tina Dico	In the Red	check	
"Use Me"	2006	Tina Dico	In the Red	check	
"What Are We Waiting For?"	2006	Duncan James	Future Past	check	check
"You Can"	2006	Duncan James	Future Past	check	check
"You Give Me Something"	2006	James Morrison	Undiscovered	check	check
"Wonderful World"	2006	James Morrison	Undiscovered	check	
"Call the Police"	2006	James Morrison	Undiscovered	check	
"Go"	2006	Jamelia	Walk with Me	check	
"Mancunian Way"	2006	Take That	Beautiful World	check	
"No Man's Land"	2007	Beverley Knight	Music City Soul	check	check
"Just a Little Bit"	2007	Mutya Buena	Real Girl	check	check
"Choke"	2007	Nate James	Kingdom Falls	check	check
"The Sun is Always Blinding Me"	2007	Darren Hayes	This Delicate Thing We've Made	check	check
"I'll Take Everything"	2007	James Blunt	All the Lost Souls	check	
"Friday Night"	2007	Craig David	Trust Me	check	
"Cosmic"	2007	Kylie Minogue	X	check	check
"Chasing Pavements"	2008	Adele	19	check	check
"Tomorrow"	2008	Duffy	Non-album single	check	
"Je realise" (featuring James Blunt)	2008	Sinik	Le Toit Du Monde	check	
"Warwick Avenue"	2008	Duffy	Rockferry	check	
"Hanging on Too Long"	2008	Duffy	Rockferry	check	
"Delayed Devotion"	2008	Duffy	Rockferry	check	
"Melt My Heart to Stone"	2008	Adele	19	check	check
"Tired"	2008	Adele	19	check	check
"Jones"	2008	Brian McFadden	Set in Stone	check	
"Alice in Wonderland"	2008	Brian McFadden	Set in Stone	check	check
"Waiting for Time"	2008	Sam Sparro	Sam Sparro	check	check
"Hot Mess"	2008	Sam Sparro	Sam Sparro	check	check
"Sad, Sad World"	2008	Amy Studt	My Paper Made Men	check	
"One Last Cigarette"	2008	Amy Studt	My Paper Made Men	check	
"You Think I Don't Care"	2008	Jack McManus	Either Side of Midnight	check	check
"Rising Up"	2008	Amanda Jenssen	Killing My Darlings	check	
"Begger's Prayer"	2008	Emiliana Torrini	Me and Armini	check	check
"What You Look For"	2008	Sam Beeton	No Definite Answer	check	
"Changes"	2008	Will Young	Let It Go	check	check
"Tell Me the Worst"	2008	Will Young	Let It Go	check	
"I Won't Give Up"	2008	Will Young	Let It Go	check	check
"Let It Go"	2008	Will Young	Let It Go	check	check
"Everything"	2008	Murs	Murs for President	check	
"One Foot Wrong"	2008	P!nk	Funhouse	check	check
"Could've Had Everything"	2008	P!nk	Funhouse	check	check
"Love, Love, Love"	2008	James Blunt	All the Lost Souls	check	check
"Water and a Flame" (featuring Adele)	2009	Daniel Merriweather	Love & War	check	check
"Giving Everything Away for Free"	2009	Daniel Merriweather	Love & War	check	check
"Not Now"	2009	Little Boots	Illuminations EP	check	
"Hurricane Drunk"	2009	Florence and the Machine	Lungs	check	check
"Dream on Hayley"	2009	James Morrison	Songs for You, Truths for Me	check	check
"Bring it Back"	2009	Kris Allen	Kris Allen	check	check
"Once"	2010	Diana Vickers	Songs from the Tainted Cherry Tree	check	
"You Don't Know Me"	2010	Alan Pownall	True Love Stories	check	
"Not the Drinking"	2010	Lauren Pritchard	Wasted in Jackson	check	check
"if Time is All I Have"	2010	James Blunt	Some Kind of Trouble	check	
"Turn Me On"	2010	James Blunt	Some Kind of Trouble	check	check
"Recover"	2010	Natasha Bedingfield	Strip Me	check	
"Yeah Right" (featuring Diggy Simmons)	2011	Dionne Bromfield	Good for the Soul	check	
"Two"	2011	Lenka	Two	check	check
"Here to Stay"	2011	Lenka	Two	check	check
"This Love Again"	2011	James Blunt	Non-album single	check	check
"Treading Water"	2011	Alex Clare	The Lateless of the Hour	check	
"Foolin'" (featuring Lil Twist)	2011	Dionne Bromfield	Good for the Soul	check	
"Hands Are Clever"	2011	Alex Clare	The Lateless of the Hour	check	check
"Sadness is Coming"	2011	Alice Gold	Seven Rainbows	check	
"End of the World"	2011	Alice Gold	Seven Rainbows	check	
"Forever"	2011	James Morrison	The Awakening	check	
"All for Nothing"	2011	Matt Cardle	Letters	check	check
"Slowly"	2011	Matt Cardle	Letters	check	check
"What the Water Gave Me"	2011	Florence and the Machine	Ceremonials	check	
"Nothing's Real but Love"	2011	Rebecca Ferguson	Heaven	check	check
"Shoulder to Shoulder"	2011	Rebecca Ferguson	Heaven	check	check
"Fairytale (Let Me Live My Life This Way)"	2011	Rebecca Ferguson	Heaven	check	check
"Fighting Suspicions"	2011	Rebecca Ferguson	Heaven	check	check
"Too Good to Lose"	2011	Rebecca Ferguson	Heaven	check	check
"I Used to Have It All"	2012	Maverick Sabre	Lonely Are the Brave	check	check
"Black & Blue"	2012	Paloma Faith	Fall to Grace	check	
"Beauty of the End"	2012	Paloma Faith	Fall to Grace	check	
"Chaos & Piss"	2012	P!nk	The Truth About Love	check	check
"The Fire"	2012	Matt Cardle	The Fire	check	
"Habit"	2012	Tulisa	The Female Boss	check	check
"Worth Your While"	2013	Jamie N Commons	Rumble and Sway EP	check	check
"No Strings"	2013	Chloe Howl	Chloe Howl	check	check
"Hold Me"	2013	Tom Odell	Long Way Down	check	check
"Nothing"	2013	Josh Krajcik	Blindly, Lonely, Lovely		check
"When You Go"	2013	Josh Krajcik	Blindly, Lonely, Lovely		check
"Don't Make Me Hopeful"	2013	Josh Krajcik	Blindly, Lonely, Lovely		check
"No Man's Land"	2013	Leanne Mitchell	Leanne Mitchell	check	
"Sense"	2013	Tom Odell	Long Way Down	check	check
"You My Everything"	2013	Ellie Goulding	Halcyon Days	check	
"Water and a Flame"	2013	Celine Dion	Loved Me Back to Life	check	check
"Didn't Know Love"	2013	Celine Dion	Loved Me Back to Life	check	check
"Fake Smile"	2013	Rebecca Ferguson	Freedom	check	check
"My Freedom"	2013	Rebecca Ferguson	Freedom	check	check
"Girls and Boys"	2014	Chloe Howl	Chloe Howl	check	check
"Good Thing"	2014	Sam Smith	In the Lonely Hour	check	check
"I've Told You Now"	2014	Sam Smith	In the Lonely Hour	check	check
"Disappointed"	2014	Chloe Howl	Chloe Howl	check	check
"Sugar Lies" (featuring Ben Weinman)	2014	Kimbra	The Golden Echo	check	
"The Magic Hour"	2014	Kimbra	The Golden Echo	check	
"Baby, Happy Birthday"	2014	Train	Bulletproof Picasso	check	
"Therapy"	2014	Mary J Blige	The London Sessions	check	check
"Takes Me a Long Time"	2014	Chloe Howl	Chloe Howl	check	check
"When You're Gone"	2014	Mary J Blige	The London Sessions	check	
"See You Again"	2015	Elle King	Love Stuff	check	check
"No More You (Interlude)"	2015	Alexandra Burke	Renegade EP		check
"Fight for Love"	2015	Kwabs	Love + War	check	
"I Am"	2015	Leona Lewis	I Am	check	check
"You Knew Me When"	2015	Leona Lewis	I Am		check
"Stay Like This"	2015	James Morrison	Higher Than Here	check	
"We Can"	2015	James Morrison	Higher Than Here	check	
"Easy Love"	2015	James Morrison	Higher Than Here	check	
"Purple Hearts (Soldier of Love)"	2015	CeeLo Green	Heart Blanche	check	check
"Only Water"	2016	Lawson	Perspective	check	
"For Julian"	2016	Dua Lipa	Non-album single	check	check
"Pay for It"	2016	Rebecca Ferguson	Superwoman	check	
"How Can I Blame You"	2016	John Legend	Darkness and Light	check	
"Blindside"	2017	Aquilo	Silhouettes	check	check
"Words with Friends"	2017	Fountaineer	Greater City, Greater Love	check	
"Choice"	2017	Charlotte OC	Careless People	check	
"The Cricketers"	2017	Fountaineer	Greater City, Greater Love	check	
"One More Light"	2017	Linkin Park	One More Light	check	
"Deserve to Be Loved"	2017	Zak Abel	Only When We're Naked	check	check
"Blind Eye"	2017	Sam Smith	The Thrill of It All	check	check
"Lost and Lonely"	2017	Paloma Faith	The Architect	check	check
"Tonight's Not the Only Night"	2017	Paloma Faith	The Architect	check	check
"Not That Special"	2018	Lily Moore	Not That Special EP	check	
"Raining Glitter"	2018	Kylie Minogue	Golden	check	check
"Sepia"	2018	Plan B	Heaven Before All Hell Breaks Loose	check	
"Brake Lights" (featuring Nao)	2018	Cosha	R.I.P. Bonzai	check	
"Fast Forward"	2018	You Me at Six	VI	check	
"Aboard"	2018	Tom Grennan	Lighting Matches	check	check
"Solid Gold"	2018	Alex Hepburn	If You Stay	check	check
"I Will Never Be"	2018	Lily Moore	I Will Never Be EP	check	check
"Like Everybody Else"	2018	Lennon Stella	Non-album single	check	
"It's the Weekend"	2018	Kovacs	Cheap Smell	check	check
"Midnight Medicine"	2018	Kovacs	Cheap Smell	check	check
"Do This for Me"	2018	Lily Moore	I Will Never Be EP	check	check
"Losing You"	2018	You Me at Six	VI	check	check
"Got My Own"	2018	Ray BLK	Empress	check	
"A Life Like This"	2018	Nao	Saturn	check	
"Between the Words" (with Matt Maeson)	2018	Devault	Stay EP	check	
"Don't Beg For Love"	2018	Sheridan Smith	A Northern Soul	check	
"Cruel"	2018	Monica Martin	Cruel	check	
"Power"	2019	James Morrison	You're Stronger Than You Know	check	check
"Slowly"	2019	James Morrison	You're Stronger Than You Know	check	
"Cross the Line"	2019	James Morrison	You're Stronger Than You Know	check	
"Into Hope"	2019	Maverick Sabre	When I Wake Up	check	check
"Hurt Me Once"	2019	Ben Platt	Sing to Me Instead	check	check
"Some People"	2019	Jasmine Thompson	Colour EP	check	check
"Loyal"	2019	Jasmine Thompson	Colour EP	check	check
"Take Care"	2019	Jasmine Thompson	Colour EP	check	check
"More"	2019	Jasmine Thompson	Colour EP	check	check
"Colour (Amen)"	2019	Jasmine Thompson	Colour EP	check	check
"This is What We Wanted"	2019	Izzy Bizu	Glita EP	check	check
"I Will Be Stronger"	2019	Céline Dion	Courage	check	check
"Best Of All"	2019	Céline Dion	Courage	check	check
"Get Me Dancing"	2019	Will Young	Lexicon	check	
"I Bet You Call"	2019	Will Young	Lexicon	check	
"Eyes Closed"	2019	Mads Langer	Eyes Closed	check	check
"If We Can Get Through This"	2019	James Arthur	You	check	
"Someday"	2019	Zucchero Fornaciari	D.O.C	check	
"Vittime Del Cool"	2019	Zucchero Fornaciari	D.O.C	check	
"Didn't Make It To The Moon"	2019	Milky Chance	Mind The Moon	check	
"Better Than I Am"	2020	Keith Urban	The Speed of Now Part 1	check	
"Moving On"	2020	Sea Girls	Open Up Your Head	check	
"Against The Water"	2020	Kita Alexander	Against The Water	check	
"Crosswords"	2020	Olivia Dean	Crosswords	check	check
"What Am I Going To Do On Sundays"	2020	Olivia Dean	Live At the Jazz Café	check	check
"Speaking Of The End"	2020	Lapsley	Through Water	check	check
"Weakness"	2020	Lennon Stella	Three. Two. One	check	
"Oh Please"	2020	Tom Grennan	Evening Road	check	check
"Last 100"	2020	Tom Misch	What Kinda Music	check	
"Tidal Wave"	2020	Tom Misch	What Kinda Music	check	
"Festival"	2020	Tom Misch	What Kinda Music	check	
"The Real"	2020	Tom Misch	What Kinda Music	check	
"Nothing Left But Family"	2020	Rebecca Ferguson	Nothing Left But Family	check	check
"Little Things"	2020	Bobby Bazini	Move Away	check	check
"Are you Satisfied?"	2020	Andrew Roachford	Twice In A Lifetime	check	
"Give It Up, Let It Go"	2020	Andrew Roachford	Twice In A Lifetime	check	
"Cherry In Tacoma"	2021	Benjamin Frances Leftwich	To Carry A Whale	check	check
"Every Time I See A Bird Released"	2021	Benjamin Frances Leftwich	To Carry A Whale	check	check
"Anything Could Happen"	2021	Dylan Cartlidge	Hope Above Adversity	check	check
"Hang My Head"	2021	Dylan Cartlidge	Hope Above Adversity	check	check
"Dare To Dream"	2021	Dylan Cartlidge	Hope Above Adversity	check	check
"Houdini"	2021	Dylan Cartlidge	Hope Above Adversity	check	check
"Family"	2021	Dylan Cartlidge	Hope Above Adversity	check	check
"Pluto"	2021	Jake Wesley Rogers	Pluto	check	
"Bad 4 Ur Health"	2021	Don Broco	Amazing Things	check	
"Not Sorry"	2021	Natalie Imbruglia	Firebird	check	
"On My Way"	2021	Natalie Imbruglia	Firebird	check	
"Foolish Love"	2021	James Gillespie	Live at St Pancras Old Church	check	check
"When You Were Mine"	2021	Joy Crookes	Skin	check	check
"Closer Than You Know"	2021	Mads Langer	Where Oceans Meet	check	check
"White Noise"	2021	Mads Langer	Where Oceans Meet	check	check
"Stop Me"	2021	Mads Langer	Where Oceans Meet	check	check
"End Of A Dark Age"	2021	Amy Allen	AWW!	check	check
"Sister 2 Sister"	2022	Ibeyi	Spell 31	check	
"Downright"	2022	Pip Millett	When Everything Is Better, I'll Let You Know	check	check
"This Stage"	2022	Pip Millett	When Everything Is Better, I'll Let You Know	check	check
"My Way"	2022	Pip Millett	When Everything Is Better, I'll Let You Know	check	check
"Apple Juice"	2022	Gretel Hanlyn	Slugeye	check	check
"In The Water"	2022	Gretel Hanlyn	Slugeye	check	check
"Headlights"	2022	Daniel Briskin	Headlights	check	check
"Want Me"	2022	Morgan Harper Jones	While You Lay Sound Asleep	check	check
"Llorale A tu Madre"	2022	Jesse & Joy	Clichés	check	
"Always Will"	2022	Seeb	Always Will	check	
"Happy Birthday"	2022	Jeremy Loops	Heard You Got Love	check	check
"Who Likes"	2022	Skinny Living	Who Likes	check	check
"Attendez-moi"	2022	Mentissa	La vingtaine	check	
"Prends-moi la tête"	2022	Mentissa	La vingtaine	check	
"What Do You Mean?"	2022	Gabe Coulter	What Do You Mean?	check	check
"Onassis"	2022	James Gillespie	The Death Of A Troubadour	check	check
"I Feel Like Dancing"	2023	Jason Mraz	Mystical Magical Rhythmical Radical Ride	check	
"Poor Baby"	2023	Elli Ingram	Bad Behaviour	check	check
"When You're Here"	2023	Albin Lee Meldau	Discomforts	check	check
"Hold Your Head Up" (with Jack Savoretti)	2023	Albin Lee Meldau	Discomforts	check	check
"Lovers"	2023	Albin Lee Meldau	Discomforts	check	check
"What Is This"	2023	Albin Lee Meldau	Discomforts	check	check
"Forget About Us"	2023	Albin Lee Meldau	Discomforts	check	check
"Into the Cold"	2023	Albin Lee Meldau	Discomforts	check	check
"Sinking Like a Stone"	2023	Albin Lee Meldau	Discomforts	check	check
"Discomforts"	2023	Albin Lee Meldau	Discomforts	check	check
"Girlfriend"	2023	Albin Lee Meldau	Discomforts	check	check
"Show Me"	2023	Albin Lee Meldau	Discomforts	check	check
"If You Ever Change Your Mind"	2023	Albin Lee Meldau	Discomforts	check	check
"Mainly Disappointed"	2023	Albin Lee Meldau	Discomforts	check	check
"Elvis, I Love You"	2023	Albin Lee Meldau	Discomforts	check	check
"User Lost"	2023	Albin Lee Meldau	Discomforts	check	check
"Loss"	2023	Albin Lee Meldau	Discomforts	check	check
"Black Swan"	2023	Victoria Canal	WELL WELL	check	
"Don't Wait"	2023	Bakermat	From A Bakermat Point Of View	check	
"Phenomenal"	2023	Bakermat	From A Bakermat Point Of View	check	
"Graveyard"	2023	Lucy Blue	Unsent Letters	check	check
"Dark Horse"	2023	Lusaint	Self Sabotage	check	check
"Digging For Gold"	2023	Rebecca Ferguson	Heaven, Pt. II	check	check
"I'm Going To Love You"	2023	Rebecca Ferguson	Heaven, Pt. II	check	check
"You Don't Have To Leave"	2023	Rebecca Ferguson	Heaven, Pt. II	check	check
"From Now On"	2023	Rebecca Ferguson	Heaven, Pt. II	check	check
"Exhausted"	2023	Michael Aldag	sorry for everything	check	check
"Girlfriends"	2023	Michael Aldag	sorry for everything	check	check
"iaw"	2023	Michael Aldag	iaw	check	check
"December"	2023	Michael Aldag	December	check	
"Run For Your Life"	2023	Sipho	PRAYERS & PARANOIA	check	
"Prayers"	2023	Sipho	PRAYERS & PARANOIA	check	
"Paranoia"	2023	Sipho	PRAYERS & PARANOIA	check	check
"Smoking Lessons"	2023	Bea And Her Business	Introverted Extrovert	check	check
"History In Our Hearts"	2024	Richard Fairlie	History In Our Hearts	check	
"Powerless"	2024	MRCY	Volume 1	check	
"Purple Canyon"	2024	MRCY	Volume 1	check	
"Wish It Was Me"	2024	Cat Burns	Early Twenties	check	
"When You're Here" (Acoustic Version)	2024	Albin Lee Meldau	Discomforts	check	
"Elvis I Love You"	2024	Albin Lee Meldau	Discomforts	check	
"Elvis I Love You"(Acoustic Version)	2024	Albin Lee Meldau	Discomforts	check	
"Sinking Like A Stone"	2024	Albin Lee Meldau	Discomforts	check	
"Sinking Like A Stone" (Acoustic Version)	2024	Albin Lee Meldau	Discomforts	check	
"Show Me"	2024	Albin Lee Meldau	Discomforts	check	check
"Royalty"	2024	Livingston	Royalty	check	check
"Rocking My Boat"	2024	MT Jones	Rocking My Boat	check	check
"Think For Yourself"	2024	I Am Roze	Think For Yourself	check	check
"Sunburnt Shoulders"	2024	Bea And Her Business	Me Vs. Me	check	check
"Numbers"	2024	The Indien	The Indien	check	check
"Goodthing"	2024	Bette Smith	Goodthing	check	
"Thank You For Making Me Feel Good"	2024	Skinny Living	Day By Day	check	
"Won't Be Long"	2024	Skinny Living	Day By Day	check	
"No Means No"	2024	Aquilo	A Quiet Invitation To A Hard Conversation	check	check
"Miss U"	2024	Goddard	Miss U	check	
"California Sober"	2024	Victoria Canal	California Sober	check	check
"Cake"	2024	Victoria Canal	Cake	check	check
"I Can't Go There"	2024	Ruthven	I Can't Go There	check	check

== Awards and nominations ==
Year	Institution	Award
Winner
2024	Ivor Novello Awards	Best Song Musically and Lyrically ("Black Swan")
2009	Ivor Novello Awards	Songwriter of the Year
2004	Ivor Novello Awards	Best Song Musically and Lyrically ("Leave Right Now")

Year	Institution	Award
Nominated
2009	Grammy Awards	Song of the Year & Record of the Year ("Chasing Pavements")

== Eg and Alice discography ==
Singles

- "Indian" c/w "Crosstown and Bobby and Holly" (WEA 1991) - did not chart
- "Doesn't Mean That Much to Me" (WEA 1991) - did not chart

Album

- 24 Years of Hunger (WEA 1991) - did not chart

== Solo discography ==
=== Singles ===
- 1995: "Stay Home" (WEA)
- 1997: "Made My Baby Cry" (WEA)
- 2009: "Broken" (Parlophone Records)
- 2015: "You Fooled Me" (Lakeshore Records)

=== Albums ===
- Turn Me On, I'm a Rocket Man (WEA, 1996)
- Adventure Man (Spilt Milk, 2009) – featuring Louis Eliot, Aret Komlosy, Neil Hannon, Ricky Ross, Matt Marston, Alice Temple, and Jack Hues

First review found at Daily Music Guide.
