= Victoria Canal =

Spanish-American singer and songwriter (born 1998)

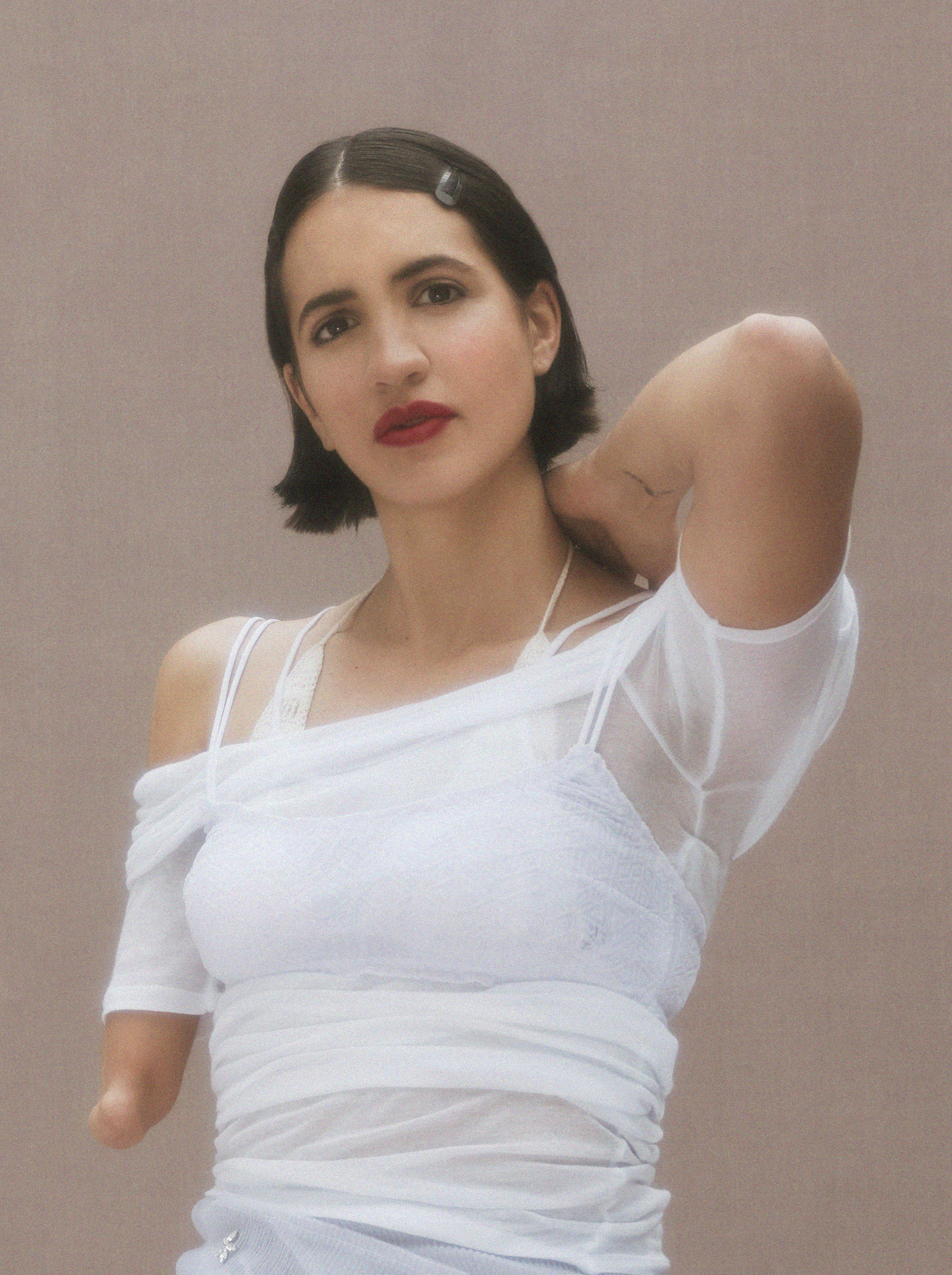
- Canal in 2023

Background information
- Born: August 11, 1998 (age 28); Munich, Germany
- Genres: Indie pop; pop rock
- Occupations: Singer; songwriter
- Instruments: Vocals; piano; guitar
- Label: Parlophone
- Website: victoriacanal.com

Victoria Canal Tinius (born August 11, 1998), known professionally as Victoria Canal, is a Spanish-American singer and songwriter.

== Early life and education ==
Canal was born in Munich, Germany, to Gwen Tinius, an architect and artist, and Francisco Canal, a businessman. She was brought up in a global third culture kid lifestyle, living in Shanghai, Tokyo, Barcelona, Madrid, Dubai, and Amsterdam. Canal is of Cuban and American heritage but refers to herself as Spanish-American, as she says Spain is where she was raised most of her life.

Canal was born without her right forearm due to amniotic band syndrome. She was inspired to play piano at the age of four after watching her grandmother play for her church and began taking classical lessons in both piano and voice at the age of six. Her piano teacher originally taught her to play with only her left hand, but her mother encouraged her to play with both hands. She switched to pop music at the age of 11.

By the age of 11, she discovered songwriting and drew inspiration from artists like John Mayer and Gavin DeGraw, delving further into pop sensibility. She participated in local and school competitions and began booking her own concerts. Upon moving to Barcelona in 2013, Canal decided to switch to an online school program to free up more time to pursue music more professionally.

== Music career ==
=== 2013–2016: Career beginnings and Into the Pull ===
By the age of 13, while living in Dubai, Canal had performed on TV channels such as Dubai One and MBC 1 and recorded her first original demo CD at JR Studios. At the age of 14, she was granted a full-tuition scholarship to Berklee College of Music's summer performance program. Not long after, Canal moved to Barcelona and studied at Jazz Conservatory en el Aula del Conservatori. She returned to Berklee College of Music the following summer with a second full-tuition scholarship. After receiving her certificate from el Aula del Conservatori, Canal traveled between Madrid and Atlanta, Georgia, to train with vocal coach "Mama Jan" Smith. In 2014, she won the Eddie’s Attic biannual Songwriter Shootout.

Canal and her mother relocated to Atlanta in April 2015 so Victoria could record her debut EP, Into the Pull, and go on her first tour opening for Joan Osborne.

=== 2017–2020: Victoria ===
In 2018, Michael Franti discovered Canal on Instagram and invited her to travel to Nashville, Tennessee, to write and record a song with him for his upcoming album. After the song was released, she was brought onto Franti's Follow Your Heart World Tour in 2019 along with Snarky Puppy. Franti and Canal performed the song they wrote together on CNN Español.

During this time, Canal released a number of singles, including "Ebony", "He Won't Know", "Drama", and "Second", while also featuring on "Will Call", a track by Thirdstory's Elliott Skinner. "Drama" was featured in large publications such as Rolling Stone and HuffPost and a Nike Air Jordan campaign for the Jordan FlyEase, a sneaker designed for athletes with disabilities. She also did a livestream performance of the song for Billboard magazine.

In 2020, Canal's submission to NPR's Tiny Desk Concert contest was featured on NPR.org. On August 28, 2020, she released her second EP, Victoria.

=== 2021–2024: Elegy ===
In 2021, as a result of the COVID-19 pandemic, Canal relocated with her family to Amsterdam where she began working on more music. During that time, Chris Martin, front man for the band Coldplay, found her music through a post she shared online and introduced her to the team at Parlophone Records. Canal signed a recording deal with Parlophone and began releasing music under their label in May 2022. She released three singles, "own me", "pity season", and "swan song", a track Martin regarded as "one of the best songs ever written". She also recorded "Bring It On", the theme song for the Apple TV series Best Foot Forward, in July 2022. In September 2022, she released Elegy, her first EP under the label.

In March 2023, it was announced that Canal would open for Hozier on a number of dates for his Unreal Unearth Tour across Europe. Shortly after, she was awarded the Amazon Music Ivors Academy Rising Star Award, which recognizes promising music-creator careers. She was the fourth woman to receive the award since its inception in 2020.

In June 2023, Canal released a dual single, "Shape/She Walks In", and was awarded the Attitude Pride Icon Award by Attitude shortly after. In November, she won the Rising Star Award at that year's Ivor Novello Awards. She won her second Ivor Novello Award with "Black Swan", receiving Best Song Musically and Lyrically alongside co-writers Jonny Lattimer and Eg White.

On June 29, 2024, Canal performed "Paradise" with Coldplay on their headlining appearance at the Glastonbury Festival.

=== 2025–present: Slowly, It Dawns ===
On January 17, 2025, Canal released her first full-length album, Slowly, It Dawns. In a review of the album, The Guardian said the album marketed her as "neither out-and-out pop star nor radio-friendly balladeer but something altogether more fluid". To promote the album, she embarked on a headline tour across the United States and the United Kingdom. At the first tour stop, the Kennedy Center, in February 2025, she went viral for wearing an anti-Trump shirt and broke the record for viewership of a Kennedy Center livestream.

== Tours ==
Canal has supported the tours of Emily King, JP Saxe, Tall Heights, Leslie Odom Jr., Teddy Swims and Michael Franti.

In 2022, she launched her debut headline tour in support of her EP Elegy, including stops in Los Angeles, New York, London and Amsterdam. In the summer of 2023, Canal opened for Hozier on his Unreal Unearth Tour across Europe and the UK. She did her second headline tour in 2025 for Slowly, It Dawns.

== Acting career ==
Canal made her acting debut in December 2022, playing the leading role of Ciela in episode 8 of season 2 of Little America on Apple TV+. The show was written by Lee Eisenberg, Kumail Nanjiani, and Emily V. Gordon.

== Personal life ==
Canal is a disabled bisexual woman. Regarding her disability, she told HuffPost, "I've always seen [my identity] as a unique opportunity, really. I used to shy away from the word ['disabled'] and all the things it implied. But as I've grown up and lived a few more years, I've met a community of people who embody strength. 'Disabled,' to me, actually has a totally different connotation." She has said she doesn't want to be known for her disability because "I don’t want to be reduced to one thing about me that doesn’t really have anything to do with my craft."

In August 2025, Canal accused Michael Franti of grooming and sexual assault when she was touring with him at age 19. Franti was dropped from his scheduled Soulshine cruise concerts because of the controversy. Franti responded to the accusation by saying that "the relationship was completely consensual".

== Discography ==
Year	Title	Type	Label	Primary/feature
2015	"Unclear"	Single	Self-released	Primary
2016	Into the Pull	EP	Self-released	Primary
2018	"City Shoes"	Single	Self-released	Primary
2018	"Ebony"	Single	Self-released	Primary
2018	"He Won't Know"	Single	Self-released	Primary
2019	The Flower (Michael Franti feat. Victoria Canal)	Album	Boo Boo Wax	Feature
2019	"Drama"	Single	Self-released	Primary
2020	"Second"	Single	Self-released	Primary
2020	"Second (Ferris Pier Remix)"	Single	Self-released	Primary
2020	"Drama (Dreux Remix)"	Single	Self-released	Primary
2020	"Will Call" (Brasstracks feat. Elliott Skinner and Victoria Canal)	Single	UMG/Capitol Records	Feature
2020	Victoria	EP	Self-released	Primary
	"Low Light" (Victoria Canal, Josh Jacobson, Lorelai, Colin Cook, Terence F. Clark)	Single	InGrooves Distribution	Feature
2021	victoria (without the drama)	EP	Self-released	Primary
2022	"own me"	Single	Parlophone	Primary
2022	"pity season"	Single	Parlophone	Primary
2022	"Best Foot Forward" (Little America - Apple TV+ Original Series Soundtrack)	Single	Parlophone	Primary
2022	"swan song"	Single	Parlophone	Primary
2022	Elegy	EP	Parlophone	Primary
2023	"BBC Piano Sessions"	Single	Parlophone	Primary
2023	"Shape/She Walks In"	Single	Parlophone	Primary
2023	"Company"	Single	Parlophone	Primary
2025	Slowly, It Dawns	LP	Parlophone	Primary
