= Alice Temple =

English musician and BMX champion

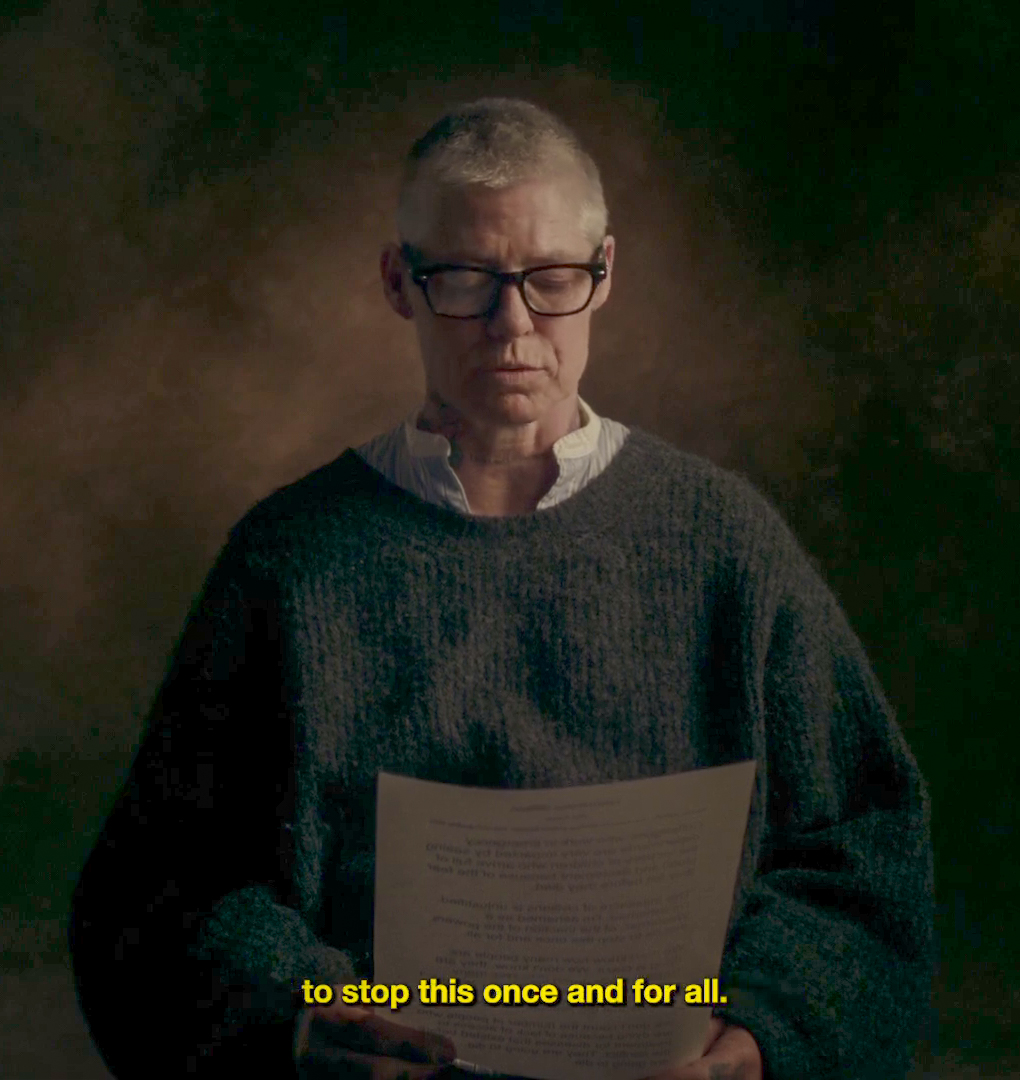
Temple participating in a plea to end the Gaza genocide in 2024

Alice Temple is an English musician, singer and songwriter, born in London. She collaborated with Eg White in the band Eg and Alice. She was also the first female UK and European BMX champion.

== BMX ==
In her teens, Temple was the first female UK and European BMX champion.

== Music ==
Temple began her music career with Eg White, founding member of 80s boyband Brother Beyond, at the age of twenty. Their collaboration, Eg and Alice, released only one album, 24 Years of Hunger (1991), but this was described by Allmusic as "one of the finest, most refined and fully realized recordings of the era, employing a much more sophisticated and romantic style than anything else out of England at the time". Allmusic also notes the accolades that 24 Years of Hunger received from other music critics:

"Recorded by the pair when they were mere twentysomethings, and predominantly in Eg White's home, it is nevertheless about as grown-up and elegant as pop music gets. A decade after the recording had all but vanished from circulation, rainsound.net had taken to calling it "one of the classic albums of the '90s," while Q Magazine went a step further when it placed the record on its list of best albums of the 20th century, describing it as having "the class of Steely Dan and the intriguing detachment of The Blue Nile."

While writing and collaborating with White, Temple caught the attention of James Lavelle of the electronic group UNKLE. She was then brought in to contribute to UNKLE's Psyence Fiction album. Her piece for the album, Bloodstain, won critical acclaim. Temple is also featured on the track Mistress, the B-side of the UNKLE single Burn my Shadow. The same track appeared on some editions of UNKLE's third album War Stories.

In 1999, Temple returned to working with White, and together they put together her debut solo album Hang Over, released on V2.

In 2005, Temple joined co-songwriter Lucie Barât to form the band The Fay Wrays, with Temple on guitar and vocals.

After 24 Years of Hunger, Eg White concentrated mainly on songwriting and production, in which he was highly successful, but he also released two solo albums. His 2009 album, Adventure Man, included the song Pull Me Through, described in the pre-release sleeve notes as "a beautiful, harrowing ballad of survival written and sung nearly completely by Alice Temple... which was a way of 'closing the circle'".

In 2008, Temple wrote, recorded and produced a second solo album entitled Be With You in A Minute, which she released on her own label.

== Modelling ==
Temple modelled in the mid-1980s, and was photographed by Mario Testino, Nick Knight and Bruce Weber. She appeared on the cover of i-D magazine in May 1986, and in another feature in 2009.

== Personal life ==
Temple was noted as a friend of Boy George during the 1980s. They were both part of London's Blitz Kids scene, which is credited with launching the New Romantic cultural movement. She is believed to be the subject of George's song A Boy Called Alice, on his 1988 UK CD single Don't Cry, in which she can be heard declaring "My name's Alice and I am not a boy". She can also be seen in the video for Culture Club's 1986 single Move Away.

After 24 Years of Hunger Temple moved to the US for several years. She had a well-publicized relationship with American model Rachel Williams.
