= Lolo (singer) =

American singer-songwriter

LOLO
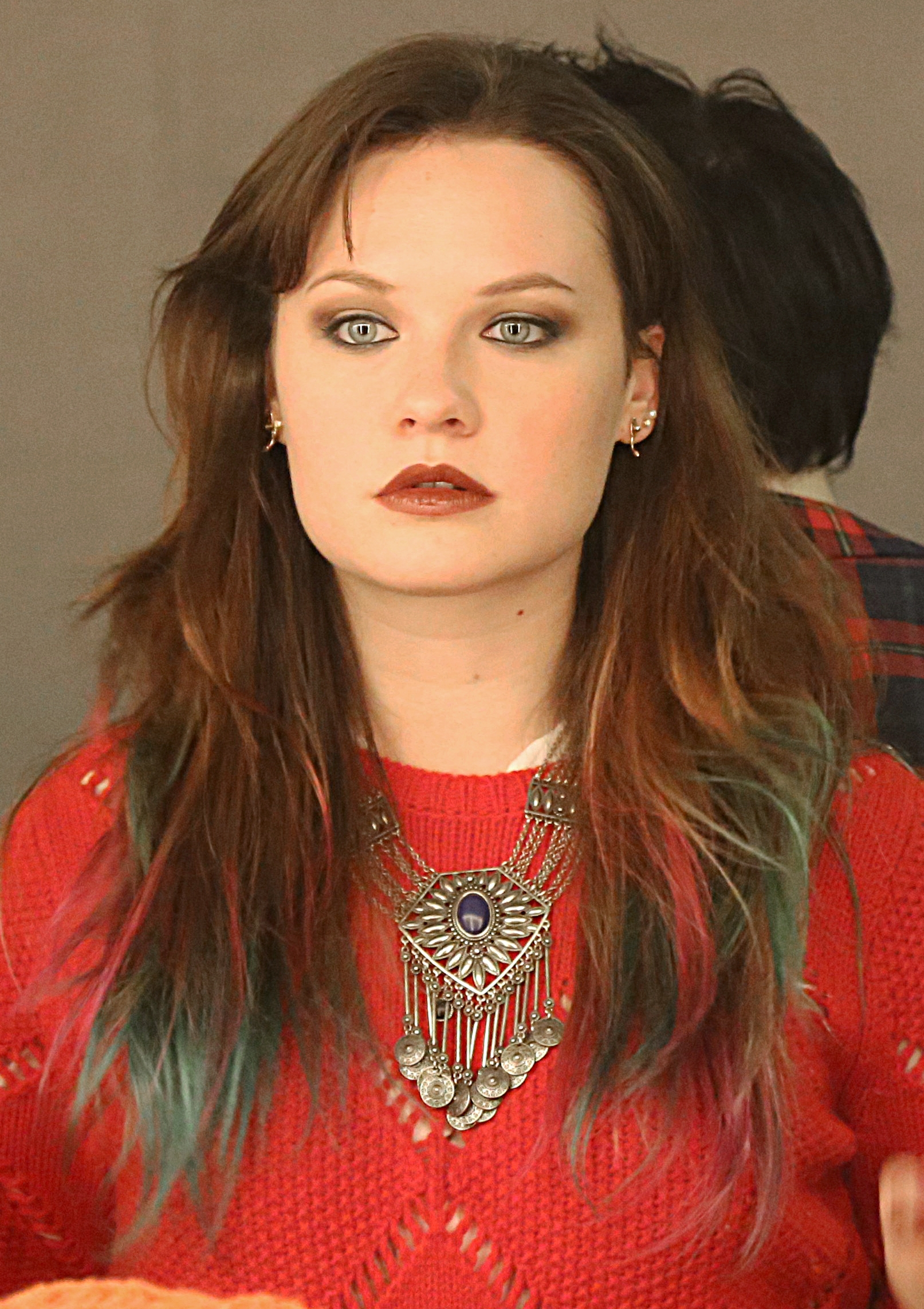
- LOLO on the It Gets Better Project Holiday Show 2014.

Background information
- Born: Lauren Pritchard; December 27, 1987 (age 38); Jackson, Tennessee, United States
- Genres: Soul; pop; alternative rock; funk
- Occupations: Singer; songwriter; actress
- Years active: 2002–present
- Labels: DCD2; Universal; Island; Atlantic
- Website: lolomusic.com

Lauren Pritchard (born December 27, 1987), known professionally as Lolo (stylized as LOLO), is an American singer, songwriter and actress. She has released two albums: Wasted in Jackson (2010) and In Loving Memory of When I Gave a Shit (2016). She was also featured on the single "Miss Jackson" by Panic! at the Disco.

== Life and career ==
Born and raised in Jackson, Tennessee, Pritchard began writing songs when she was 14 years old. She then moved to Los Angeles at 16, where she lived with Lisa Marie Presley and tried to make it as a singer in a reggae band.

She succeeded as a musical actress, by originating and playing the role of the 15-year-old runaway "Ilse" in the hit Broadway show Spring Awakening for two years.

Pritchard settled in the United Kingdom (UK) and signed with Universal/Island Records.

In August 2010, she released the single "Painkillers", and the song was also released in a remix with rapper Talib Kweli.

Her debut album, Wasted in Jackson, written and produced with Eg White, was digitally released on October 25, 2010, and debuted at No. 84 in the UK. It was also scheduled for physical release in the United States on February 22, 2011.

In 2013, Pritchard adopted the stage name Lolo. She has since signed with DCD2 Records. "Under her given name, Pritchard was also the composer-lyricist of the new musical Songbird..." She was also featured on the Panic! at the Disco song, "Miss Jackson" and later re-created a sample of "Tom's Diner" by Susanne Vega for American pop rock band Fall Out Boy's single "Centuries" in 2014.

In September 2016, LOLO released the full-length album In Loving Memory of When I Gave A Shit.. The album was produced by Jake Sinclair and was released by Atlantic Records. It received a positive review in Atwood Magazine.

On November 7, 2017, Pritchard's debut feature film (Romance) In the Digital Age was released by Comedy Dynamics. The film starred Pritchard as "Ellis Tillman', an ex-emo star turned med-student and was written and directed by Jason Michael Brescia. Pritchard also composed the song "(Romance) In The Digital Age" for the film.

In 2019, Pritchard was made a member of the Off-Broadway Animus Theatre Company in NYC.

== Influences ==
Pritchard has mentioned Billy Joel, Joni Mitchell, Al Green and Candi Staton as some of the influences behind her music.

== Discography ==
=== Albums ===
- Wasted in Jackson (2010) (as Lauren Pritchard)
- In Loving Memory of When I Gave a Shit (2016)
- X (2021)
- Lauren (2022)

=== Extended plays ===
- Comeback Queen EP (2015)

=== Singles ===
- "When the Night Kills the Day" (2010) (as Lauren Pritchard)
- "Painkillers" (2010) (as Lauren Pritchard)
- "Not the Drinking" (2010) (as Lauren Pritchard)
- "Stuck" (2011) (as Lauren Pritchard)
- "Weapon for Saturday" (2013)
- "Heard It from a Friend" (2013)
- "Year Round Summer of Love" (2013)
- "Gangsters" (2014)
- "Hit and Run" (2014)
- "I Don't Wanna Have to Lie" (2015)
- "Shine" (2016)
- "Not Gonna Let You Walk Away" (2016)

=== Promotional singles ===
- "The Devil's Gone to Dinner" (2016)
- "The Courtyard" (2016)
- "Heard It from a Friend" (2016)

=== Features ===
- "Miss Jackson" (2013) – Panic! at the Disco
- "Headphones" (2014) – Matt Nathanson
- "WAIT" (2014) – Lemaitre
- "Centuries" (2014) – Fall Out Boy [Uncredited]
- "Cure Me" (2014) – Redlight
- "Boomerang" (2014) – Joey Contreras
- "Last Christmas" (2023) – Virginia to Vegas, Tyler Shaw, New Friends, Noelle, and Shawn Hook

=== Other Releases ===
- "Not Gonna Let You Walk Away (Tennessee Mix)" (2016)
