= Lusaint =

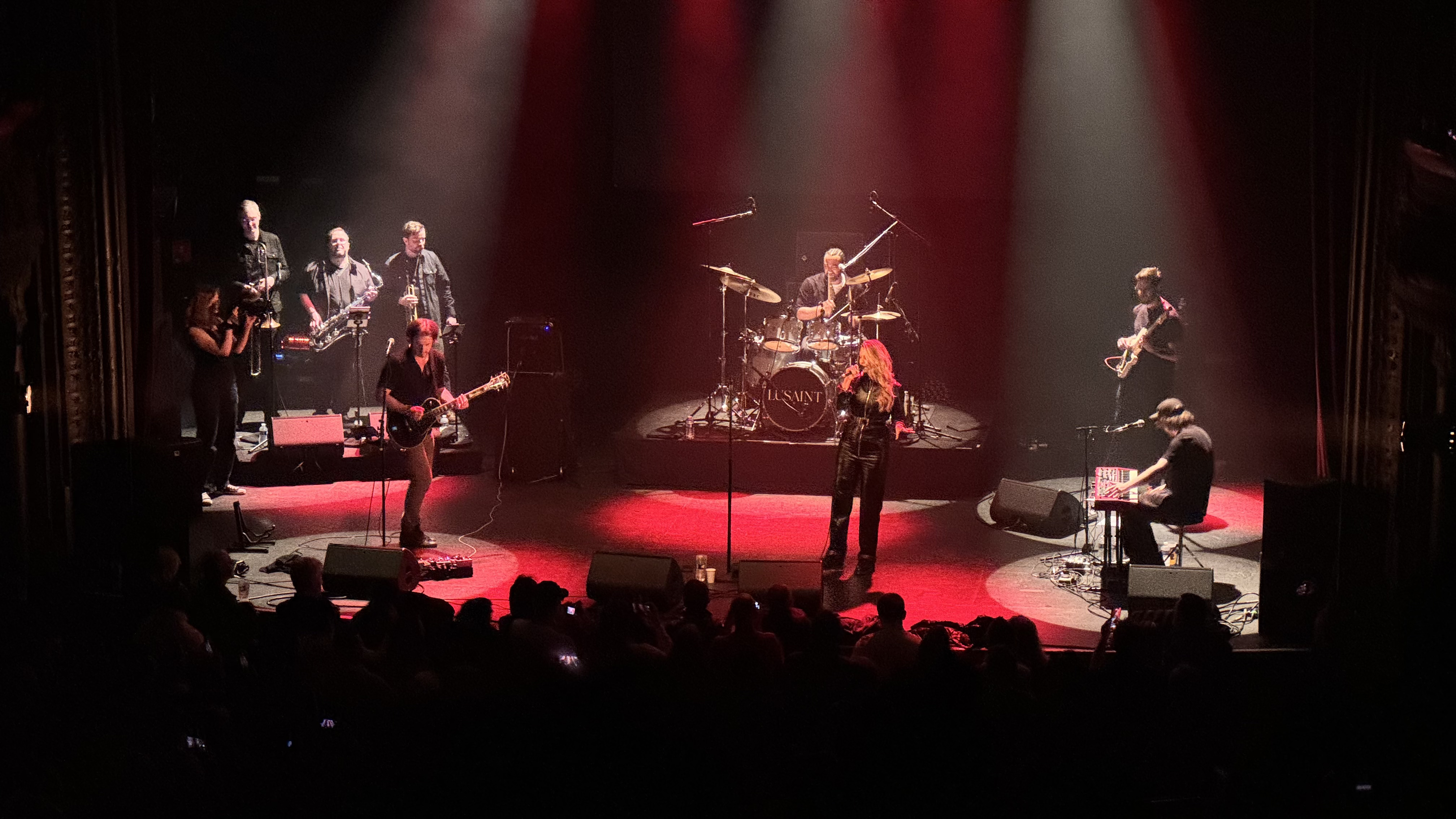
- Lusaint at La Cigale (Paris) Nov 2024

Background information
- Born: Stretford, Manchester, England, U.K.
- Genres: Pop; Soul; Jazz
- Occupations: Singer; songwriter
- Labels: Tristar Records; Perfect Havoc; Heavenly Fire (distributed by The Orchard)
- Website: www.lusaint.com

Lucy Hopkins (born 15 May 1992) is an English singer-songwriter. She broke record for the most daily Shazams in the UK after one of her cover songs was featured in a popular TV show. Her artistic style has been compared to Adele, Amy Winehouse, Billie Holiday and Nina Simone and she has been recognised as one to watch by tastemaker media Rolling Stone, Wonderland, Notion, The Manc, All Music, F Word Magazine, Fizzy Mag, A&R Worldwide, Esquire and support from various BBC Radio 1 DJs, Abbey Road producer Rob Cass, and Elton John. She released more covers on YouTube and went on to release original music.

Lusaint is popular in France and Italy, and was selected to meet the Pope and perform at the annual Concerto di Natale (Christmas concert), the Monte Carlo Film Festival Gala. She is signed to Universal Music Publishing Group and managed by Heavenly Fire. As of May 2025, Lusaint has some 500k monthly listeners on Spotify alone.

== Biography ==
Born Lucy Hopkins in Stretford, Manchester, one of her earliest memories is listening to her parents’ record collection and being inspired by Billie Holiday and Nina Simone's voices. Her favourite three albums on Apple Music are Bon Iver's For Emma, Forever Ago, Lauryn Hill's The Miseducation of Lauryn Hill and Nina Simone. Lucy discovered singing at primary school, joining the choir, then performing solo and auditioning for plays. Lusaint started recording cover songs when working in a clothing store after university. Later, she made CDs of her singing and gave them out to local restaurants, which led to her getting gigs around Manchester. After releasing a handful of covers, she was making enough money to quit her retail job to focus on pursuing her music career.

== Career ==
=== Breakthrough - Shazam record-breaker ===
In 2019, Lusaint's two-year-old cover of En Vogue's ‘Don't Let Go (Love)’ / ‘More Than Friends’ was played for a few seconds on UK TV show, ITV2's Love Island, and was Shazamed 23,000 times in 24 hours, breaking the music discovery platform's record for the most UK daily searches of all-time previously held by Florence and the Machine and placing number one on the Shazam UK chart (knocking Ed Sheeran off number one). It went to number 23 on the iTunes download chart, Top 10 Spotify viral song chart and number 62 on the UK Official Charts Company charts for Sales and Downloads. The song was included in Ministry of Sound's Love Island 2019 Moments Playlist, a top-trending Apple Music playlist. Her version of the song was previously released by Tristar Records in 2017.

=== ‘Wicked Game’ cover ===
In 2021, Lusaint released a cover of Chris Isaak’s ‘Wicked Game’, as May 2025 it has 40 million views on the YouTube video alone.

Junior pair ice skating world champion Martin Bidar, selected Lusaint's ‘Wicked Game’ version in his Free skating routines with Barbora Kuchianova in the 2023–24 and 2024–25 seasons.

In 2024, Norwegian producer DJ duo KREAM included Lusaint's ‘Wicked Game’ vocal performance on their version, at October 2025 it is approaching 35 million Spotify streams.

=== Original music ===
In 2022, Lusaint collaborated with Franky Wah on an electronic music track called ‘Find Out Who We Are’ and is the featured vocalist. In 2025, the song had 541,000+ plays on Spotify.

In 2023, Lusaint signed to record label Heavenly Fire and released her debut headline original music, track ‘Dark Horse’, made in collaboration with Eg White, who has previously worked with artists including Adele, P!nk, Florence and the Machine.

Single ‘Sweet Tooth’ was released in the February and following Lusaint's first TV performance on French television show Taratata, and live session for local station RTL, the song entered charts in the country including Shazam Discovery (#8) and Pop (#46), Spotify Viral (#81) and Apple Music France Future Hits playlist. Elton John featured the song on his Apple Music “Rocket Hour” radio show, and Instagram.

In 2024, Lusaint released her debut EP, Self Sabotage, produced by Blue May who has worked with artists including Jorja Smith, Joy Crookes, Kano, Lily Allen. Tastemaker support came from BBC Manchester, BBC Introducing and BBC Radio 1 UK including Jack Saunders, Clara Amfo, Mollie King and Sian Eleri’s Future Pop/Sounds; in France - Radio Nova, RTL, Europe 2, Europe 1, and is regularly played on Italian radio with multiple songs entering the National Airplay chart. Lusaint features on a number of key editorial playlists on the main music streaming platforms and in May 2025, the EP has 7.5million plays just on Spotify.

In 2025, Lusaint releases The Apothecary EP that includes singles ‘Neon Lights’ and ‘Joking’. An ITV interview says she has ‘conquer[ed] Europe’, Lusaint tells them she has had ‘the craziest year’ of her life, and she does the first performance of ‘Neon Lights’ in the Granada Reports studio. Her music receives support from BBC Manchester (in session, best music from the boroughs).

=== Music publishing, other deals and high-profile performances ===
Following the release of her EP, Universal Music Publishing Group France signed Lusaint to a global deal; the EP had 10 million streams within two months since release.

Lusaint signed for live performances to the One Fiinix Live talent roster. She performed at many festivals, support tours and headline tours since then, including BBC Introducing, Boardmasters, The Great Escape, Neighbourhood, Cosmic Cape, BBC Introducing London, Lower Third, Paper Dress Vintage, Band On The Wall, Islington Assembly Hall, Albert Hall (Manchester); support slots for RAYE and Tom Grennan at Metronome Festival, Jess Glynne, JC Stewart and Nia Archives in the UK; Chris Isaak, James Blunt and Dire Straits in France. Then, signing with a French promoter, she did a headline debut tour in France.

In 2024, Lusaint was selected by the judges for the PPL Momentum Fund from PRS Foundation to help make her Self Sabotage EP, then following its release PPL exclusively signed Lusaint for international royalties collection, noting that her international support in Europe included French stations Radio Nova, RTL, Europe 2, Europe 1 and Italy's Top 40 national airplay chart with track ‘Fool For You’.

In 2025, Lusaint was selected by the BPI as a notable artist to receive funding from its annual Music Export Growth Scheme (MEGS) to help grow her profile on the global stage.

On 30 November 2024, Lusaint performed at the 21st edition Monte Carlo Film Festival end gala, including guest of honour Prince Albert II of Monaco.

In December 2024, Lusaint performed at the 32nd edition of the Christmas Concert (Concerto di Natale) at the Vatican in Rome, Italy. Called a ‘traditional and prestigious occasion’, also broadcast on primetime TV on Canale 5, it was hosted December 14 at the Auditorium Conciliazione where Lusaint met Pope Francis and was the only UK artist in addition to Emeli Sande selected to perform, accompanied by the Orchestra Italiana del Cinema, conducted by Maestro Adriano Pennino.

Discografia
