= The Dreamer (Tamyra Gray album) =

Studio album by Tamyra Gray
- Released: May 25, 2004
- Recorded: 2003–2004
- Genre: Soul; hip-hop; R&B
- Length: 52:42
- Label: 19 Recordings Ltd.

Professional ratings
Review scores
Source	Rating
AllMusic	4/5 stars
Entertainment Weekly	B−
Slant Magazine	2.5/5 stars

The Dreamer' is the debut album by American Idol Season 1 4th-placed finalist Tamyra Gray. It peaked at number 23 on the Billboard 200 with a first-week sales of 39,000.

== Track listing ==
1. "Star"
2. "The Only Thing"
3. "Legend" (co-written with Eg White)
4. "Raindrops Will Fall" (written by Tamyra Gray, Louis Biancaniello and Sam Watters)
5. "Ha Ha" (written by Tamyra Gray, Louis Biancaniello and Sam Watters)
6. "17"
7. "Don't Stop (Keep It Coming)"
8. "U've Only Got 1" (co-written with Eg White)
9. "Faces" (written by Tamyra Gray, Louis Biancaniello and Sam Watters)
10. "Like a Child"
11. "Yesterday/Today"
12. "Good Ol' Days"
13. "God Bless the Dreamer" (written by Louis Biancaniello, Sam Watters, Mark Calderon, Bryan Abrams, Kevin Thornton and H Lee)

== Charts ==
Chart (2004)	Peak position
US Billboard 200	23
US Top R&B/Hip-Hop Albums (Billboard)	16
