= Hymns for the Haunted =

Studio album by Amanda Jenssen
- Released: 14 November 2012
- Genre: pop, rock, soul
- Length: 42:38
- Label: Epic Records/Sony Music Entertainment
- Producer: Pär Wiksten, Björn Yttling

Amanda Jenssen chronology
Happyland (2009)	Hymns for the Haunted (2012)	Sånger från ön (2015)

Singles from Hymns for the Haunted
- 1. "Ghost / Illusionist" Released: October 16, 2012; 2. "Dry My Soul" Released: February 14, 2012

Hymns for the Haunted is the third studio album by Swedish recording artist Amanda Jenssen. The song "The Carnival" was used on American Horror Story: Freak Show. Jenssen described the album as both “Voodoo Jazz” and “Jungle Jazz”.

== Track listing ==
No.	Title	Length
1.	"Ghost"	4:15
2.	"Boom"	4:25
3.	"Volcano Swing"	3:35
4.	"Light and Easy"	2:49
5.	"Dry My Soul"	3:07
6.	"Lay Down"	2:08
7.	"Open the Lid"	3:23
8.	"Illusionist"	4:33
9.	"Leon"	3:37
10.	"Thunderful Jolene"	3:12
11.	"Michael's Garden"	3:51
12.	"The Carnival"	3:47

== Charts ==
=== Weekly charts ===
Chart (2012–2013)	Peak position
Swedish Albums (Sverigetopplistan)	2

=== Year-end charts ===
Chart (2012)	Position
Swedish Albums (Sverigetopplistan)	24
Chart (2013)	Position
Swedish Albums (Sverigetopplistan)	86
