= Skinny Living =

English indie rock band

- Origin: Wakefield, West Yorkshire, England
- Genres: Indie soul
- Years active: 2013–present
- Labels: Skinny Living; RCA; Polydor
- Members: Ryan Johnston; Danny Hepworth
- Past members: Rhys Anderton = Will Booth
- Website: skinnyliving.co.uk

Skinny Living are a two-piece English indie-soul band from Wakefield, West Yorkshire. The band is made up of, Belfast-born vocalist Ryan Johnston and guitarist Danny Hepworth.

The name Skinny Living describes the financial reality and lifestyle of the working class – hard graft on a low income with a lust for life, passion for family and an optimistic attitude about the future. The band signed to RCA Records in 2017, and then to Polydor in 2019. That same year saw them have their tracks featured on the likes of Clash Magazine, play over 250 shows, as well as being selected to headline Live at Leeds. In 2020 they were going to be touring with The Kaiser Chiefs, as well as headlining their own shows in London and Leeds.

== Career ==
=== New Familiar ===
With over 60 million streams worldwide, Skinny Living had a hiatus in 2020, when they signed to Parlophone and released a side project in the form of an EP called "Textures" under the alias 'New Familiar'.

By the end of 2022, the band were back to being called Skinny Living, and issued the single "Who Likes" produced by Eg White and Rich Cooper. On 9 November 2022, the band played a gig at King Tuts in Glasgow.

=== Day by Day ===
In September 2024, Skinny Living released "No Messiah" from their album Day by Day, a self-released album that charted at Number 24 in the UK charts, having been in the Top 10 of the midweek update.
