= Wasted in Jackson =

Studio album by Lauren Pritchard
- Released: October 25, 2010
- Recorded: 2008–2010
- Genre: Pop; soul
- Length: 38:05
- Label: Island Records
- Producer: Lauren Pritchard; Eg White; Mike Spencer; Marcus Mumford

Lauren Pritchard chronology
Wasted in Jackson (2010)	In Loving Memory of When I Gave a Shit (2016)

Singles from Wasted in Jackson
- 1. "When the Night Kills the Day" Released: May 3, 2010; 2. "Painkillers" Released: August 9, 2010; 3. "Not the Drinking" Released: October 25, 2010; 4. "Stuck" Released: February 14, 2011

Wasted in Jackson is the debut studio album recorded by American singer-songwriter Lauren Pritchard, produced by Eg White and was released on October 25, 2010 on Island Records. The album was digitally released on October 25, 2010, followed by a physical release on October 25, 2010 through Island Records. The lead single from the album, "When the Night Kills the Day", was released on May 3, 2010. A second single from the album, "Painkillers", was released on August 9, 2010. A third single from the album, "Not the Drinking", was released on October 25, 2010, the same day as the album's release. "Not The Drinking" was the only single not to be released physically. All of the singles failed to chart. "Not the Drinking" was added to BBC Radio 2 A-List in October 2010 and remained there for two weeks. Wasted in Jackson entered the UK Album Chart at 84 on October 31. A fourth single, "Stuck", was released on February 14, 2011.

== Background ==
Speaking in November 2010 to noted UK soul writer Pete Lewis – Assistant Editor of Blues & Soul – Pritchard explained how the album's title emanated from its evocative title-track and its reference to her small-town, Deep-South-USA upbringing: "In a way I wanted to pay homage to my hometown. I'm actually very thankful that it is the tiny little small town that it IS, because it made me wanna get the heck OUTTA there! You know, from a very young age I always knew that I wanted to go somewhere else! And so that in turn became the reason why I started my journey and what ultimately led me to London and making this album! I just always felt like I was wasting my time BEING in Jackson as a young kid."

== Critical reception ==
The album has received generally positive reviews from music critics. Telegraph music critic Andrew Perry gave the album a positive review, commenting, "Born in Jackson, Tennessee, 22-year-old Lauren Pritchard already has a survivor's CV."

== Track listing ==
No.	Title	Writer(s)	Length
1.	"Stuck"	Lauren Pritchard	3:44
2.	"Not the Drinking"	Pritchard; Eg White	3:36
3.	"Wasted in Jackson"	Pritchard	3:13
4.	"I Hope It's You"	Pritchard	3:52
5.	"Painkillers"	Pritchard	3:31
6.	"No Way"	Pritchard	3:31
7.	"Hanging Up"	Pritchard	3:30
8.	"Going Home"	Pritchard	3:47
9.	"Bad Time to Fall"	Pritchard	3:10
10.	"Try a Little Harder"	Pritchard	3:12
11.	"When the Night Kills the Day"	Pritchard	3:45
Total length:			38:05

iTunes bonus track
No.	Title	Writer(s)	Length
12.	"Photograph"	Pritchard	4:15
Total length:			42:20

== Chart performance ==
Chart (2010)	Peak
UK Albums Chart	84
