= 24 Years of Hunger =

1991 album by Eg & Alice

Studio album by Eg & Alice
- Released: 1991
- Studios: Kong's Restaurant, All Saints' Road; Betty's house, Hampstead; Eg's kitchen, Notting Hill
- Genre: Sophisti-pop
- Length: 52:02
- Label: WEA
- Producers: Eg & Alice, David Ogilvy (tracks 6 & 7)

24 Years of Hunger is a pop music album released in 1991 by Eg & Alice, the collaboration of Eg White and Alice Temple. 24 Years of Hunger was critically acclaimed, although it failed to chart. It is the only album that the duo ever released.

AllMusic describes 24 Years of Hunger as "one of the finest, most refined and fully realized recordings of the era, employing a much more sophisticated and romantic style than anything else out of England at the time".

AllMusic also notes the accolades that the 24 Years of Hunger album received from other music critics:

"Recorded by the pair when they were mere twentysomethings, and predominantly in Eg White's home, it is nevertheless about as grown-up and elegant as pop music gets. A decade after the recording had all but vanished from circulation, rainsound.net had taken to calling it "one of the classic albums of the '90s," while Q went a step further when it placed the record on its list of best albums of the 20th century, describing it as having "the class of Steely Dan and the intriguing detachment of the Blue Nile."

Martin Rowsell, in The Rough Guide to Rock, notes that while reviewers compared the album to Prefab Sprout and Prince, Eg and Alice cited their own musical influences as John Lennon, Traveling Wilburys, Joe Jackson, Joni Mitchell and Curtis Mayfield. Noting the huge discrepancy between the album's critical and commercial success, Rowsell speculates that White's songwriting may have been too personal for mainstream acceptance at the time.

== Track listing ==
1. Rockets (5:36)
2. In a Cold Way (4:31)
3. Mystery Man (3:46)
4. And I Have Seen Myself (3:47)
5. So High, So Low (4:55)
6. New Year's Eve (6:21)
7. Indian (3:49)
8. Doesn't Mean That Much to Me (6:08)
9. Crosstown (4:48)
10. IOU (3:51)
11. I Wish (4:30)
