= Happyland (album) =

Studio album by Amanda Jenssen
- Released: 28 October 2009
- Genre: Pop, soul
- Length: 36:39
- Label: Epic Sweden

Amanda Jenssen chronology
Killing My Darlings (2008)	Happyland (2009)	Hymns for the Haunted (2012)

Professional ratings
Review scores
Source	Rating
Allmusic	3.5/5 stars

Happyland is the second studio album by Swedish singer Amanda Jenssen, who finished second in Idol 2007. It was released on October 28, 2009. The first single from the album was the title track "Happyland" and it was released on September 28, 2009 and entered the Swedish Singles Chart at number three.

== Track listing ==
Swedish Edition
No.	Title	Length
1.	"Happyland"	3:32
2.	"Save Me for a Day"	2:50
3.	"Autopilot"	3:03
4.	"Morning Light"	3:08
5.	"Our Time"	3:09
6.	"Sing Me to Sleep"	2:16
7.	"The Rebounder"	2:33
8.	"The End"	3:10
9.	"Charlie"	3:11
10.	"Common Henry""	2:52
11.	"Borderline"	2:44
12.	"I Choose You"	4:04

Bonus Tracks

iTunes Edition
No.	Title	Length
13.	"We're All Friends Tonight"	3:24

International Edition
No.	Title	Length
13.	"Amarula Tree (Happyland Mix)"	3:01
14.	"Greetings from Space"	5:16
15.	"For the Sun"	3:42
16.	"Look What They’ve Done to My Song (Happyland Mix)"	3:04
17.	"Happyland (Desert Mist)"	3:02

== Charts ==
=== Weekly charts ===
Chart (2009–2010)	Peak position
German Albums (Offizielle Top 100)	43
Swedish Albums (Sverigetopplistan)	3
Swiss Albums (Schweizer Hitparade)	68

=== Year-end charts ===
Chart (2009)	Position
Swedish Albums (Sverigetopplistan)	11
Chart (2010)	Position
Swedish Albums (Sverigetopplistan)	26
