= Yip Yip Coyote =

1980s UK cowpunk band

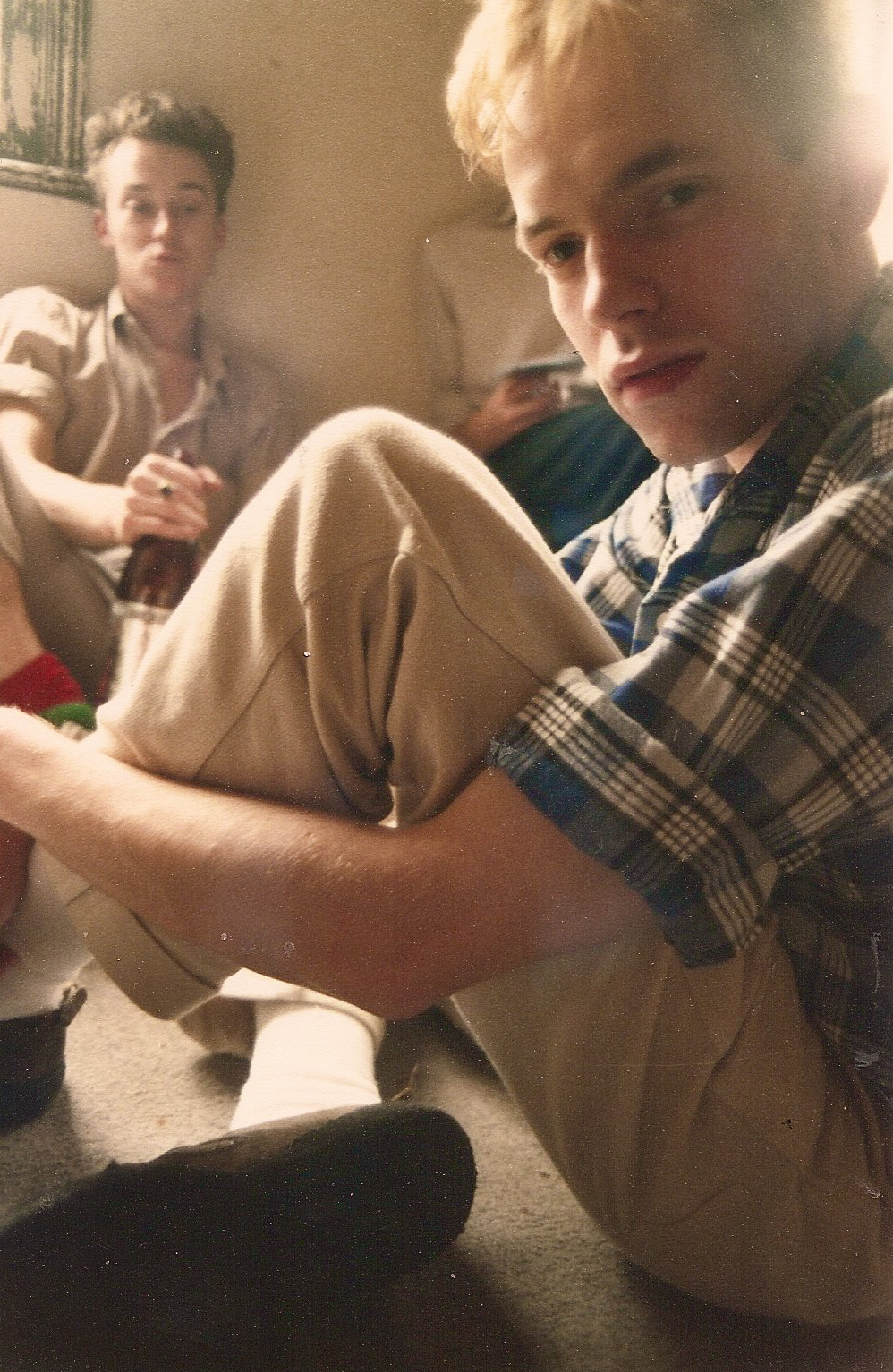
Guitarist Carl Evans in 1982.

Yip Yip Coyote was a UK indie rock band that was part of the 1980s cowpunk subgenre. The band's debut LP Fifi (1985) and singles in the UK ("Pioneer Girl" and "Dream of the West", both available as a 7" and a 12" EP) were released by Illegal Records and I.R.S. Records. Producers on these records included Anne Dudley (Art Of Noise), Tony Mansfield, Jesse James and David Ruffy. The band's only US release was a song on the soundtrack for the film Bachelor Party. The band's sound blended rock, pop, New Wave, and synth-pop. BBC DJ John Peel gave the band a session on January 30, 1984.

The band's constant members were Fifi Russell (credited as Fifi Coyote) on lead vocals and Carl Evans (formerly from the band The Chefs) on guitar. Rhythm section members included Eg White (Francis White) on bass and Volker VonHoff on drums. For some songs, added performers included Carrie Booth on keyboards, Harry Pitch on harmonica, and "Luis" on percussion). Bob Stanley calls the band part of one of the two "insular mid-eighties movements" (cowpunk and psychobilly) "...which harked back to the spirit of '76" (1976), The Clash's beliefs, and the view that roots rock was path to "true grit".
