= Do You Love Me? (Amanda Jenssen song) =

"Do You Love Me"

Single by Amanda Jenssen

from the album Killing My Darlings
- A-side: "Do You Love Me"
- Released: January 2008
- Length: 3:34
- Songwriter: Vincent Pontare

Amanda Jenssen singles chronology
"Look What They've Done To My Song" (2007)	"Do You Love Me" (2008)	"Amarula Tree" (2008)

"Do You Love Me" is a song written by Vincent Pontare, and recorded by Amanda Jenssen on her 2008 album Killing My Darlings. It was also released as a single on 23 January the same year.

She performed the song during the 2008 Grammis Awards ceremony. The song became the 20th most successful of Trackslistan that year.

The song also charted at Svensktoppen for 10 weeks between 3 February-6 April 2008 before leaving the chart. It peaked at number two.

The song has been used in scenes of US TV series Privileged.

== Charts ==
=== Weekly charts ===
Chart (2008–2009)	Peak position
Sweden (Sverigetopplistan)	1

=== Year-end charts ===
Chart (2008)	Position
Sweden (Sverigetopplistan)	9
