= Tamyra Gray =

American actress, singer and songwriter

- Born: July 26, 1979 (age 47); Takoma Park, Maryland
- Origin: Atlanta, Georgia, United States
- Genres: R&B, soul
- Years active: 2002–present

Tamyra Monica Gray (born July 26, 1979) is an American actress, singer and songwriter, who finished fourth place on the first season of the musical reality competition American Idol in 2002. Post American Idol, Gray has begun acting on Broadway and television. She had a recurring role on the third season of the drama series Boston Public in early 2003.

== Personal life ==
Gray was born in Takoma Park, Maryland, and later moved to Norcross, Georgia. She graduated from Stone Mountain High School in Stone Mountain, Georgia in 1997. She began singing at an early age. She competed in several beauty pageants and was named Miss Atlanta in 1998. Gray attended Georgia State University, majoring in business law and entertainment management. Prior to American Idol, she worked a variety of jobs including daycare worker, party motivator, telemarketer, waitress, and running her own cleaning service. She also filmed Coca-Cola commercials and worked with artists like her friend Lisa "Left Eye" Lopes and rapper DMX with hopes of finding an opening into the entertainment industry.

Gray married Color Me Badd singer Sam Watters (whom she worked with on The Dreamer) on September 2, 2006, in Capri, Italy. About 45 guests were in attendance, including her then-manager, Lisa Braude. Gray's photographer sold the wedding photos to American press, and the low-key relationship soon became public after People broke the story. She is now stepmom to Kieran, Sam's son from a previous marriage. On March 23, 2010, Gray announced to Entertainment Weekly that she was expecting her first baby with Watters. On July 17, 2010, Gray gave birth to daughter Sienna Marie.

== American Idol ==
In 2002, Gray became one of the ten finalists on the first season of American Idol, eventually finishing fourth. Her performance of the Burt Bacharach classic "A House Is Not a Home" was described by Judge Simon Cowell as "one of the best performances on television" that he had ever seen.

Gray was also featured on two tracks on the American Idol Christmas CD—a solo version of "Silent Night" and a duet version of "Have Yourself a Merry Little Christmas" with Ruben Studdard. She also appeared on the Idol Christmas Special on Fox with Clarkson, Studdard, and other finalists from the first two Idol seasons.

During the third season of American Idol, she returned to the show on several occasions to sing "Raindrops Will Fall" and "Star", songs she co-wrote for her debut album, and to sing the National Anthem to open the final results show of the season. Gray also co-wrote the American Idol season three single "I Believe", which was performed by Idol finalists Fantasia Barrino and Diana DeGarmo. Barrino then released "I Believe" as her American Idol single, which debuted at No. 1 on the Billboard Hot 100 Charts.

=== List of performances on American Idol ===
==== Audition ====
"Vision of Love" by Mariah Carey

==== Semifinals ====
- June 18, 2002 "And I'm Telling You I'm Not Going" by Jennifer Holliday

On June 19, 2002, Tamyra became a finalist of American Idol.

==== Finals ====
- July 16, 2002 "Touch Me in the Morning" by Diana Ross
  - Theme: Motown
- July 23, 2002 "A Fool in Love" by Ike & Tina Turner
  - Theme: '60s Music
- July 30, 2002 "If I Were Your Woman" by Gladys Knight & the Pips
  - Theme: '70s Music
- August 6, 2002 "Minnie the Moocher" by Cab Calloway
  - Theme: Big Band
- August 13, 2002 "A House Is Not a Home" by Dionne Warwick
  - Theme: Burt Bacharach Songs
- August 20, 2002 "New Attitude" by Patti LaBelle and "Feel the Fire" by Stephanie Mills

During the season, many critics and fans thought that Tamyra would make it to the finals, and perhaps win. However, on August 21, Tamyra was placed in the Bottom 2 (along with Nikki McKibbin), and then eliminated from the show. The judges expressed their shock at the audience decision, while making supportive comments to Gray.

== Music career ==
In 1998, Gray provided background vocals on DMX's song "Slippin'." After American Idol, creator Simon Fuller signed Tamyra to his newly formed independent record label, 19 Records, a division of his 19 Management, Gray's first solo album, The Dreamer, which Gray wrote herself, was eventually released on May 25, 2004. The album sold 39,000 copies during its first week in release and has sold 122,000 to date. The H. Hector and J. Vasquez mixes of Tamyra's lead single, "Raindrops Will Fall," peaked at number five on Billboard's Hot Dance Music/Club Play chart; another set of remixes of the same song also hit number nine on that chart. Gray later parted ways with 19 Entertainment but remains close with Fuller, who attended her wedding to Sam Watters in Capri, Italy.

Gray performed a duet with American Idol season one winner Kelly Clarkson on Clarkson's debut release Thankful. The song, entitled "You Thought Wrong," was co-written by Gray but never released as a single.

Gray was a co-writer and back-up singer on Jessica Simpson's album A Public Affair, which was released August 29, 2006. She is listed fourth in writing credits on the songs "If You Were Mine" and "The Lover in Me", and sang back-up on "If You Were Mine" . The CD debuted on Billboard's 200 Chart at number five.

Gray also co-wrote the number one Billboard Hot 100 song "I Believe."

Gray was reported to be in the process of recording a new album. Gray called it more club-friendly, hip-hop-based project than her debut. She is also in the process of finding a record label. Tamyra tweeted that she was in the studio recording a new album with Ryan Tedder and the production team The Runaways which her husband Sam Watters is part of. They had planned to release her album through a major label in 2010.

== Acting career ==
She landed the recurring role of Aisha Clemens, a student in an abusive relationship, on Boston Public, appearing in seven episodes in 2003. She showcased her singing abilities, famously covering Luther Vandross' "Dance With My Father" and Dolly Parton's "I Will Always Love You". She has had guest roles on episodes of Half & Half, Las Vegas, Tru Calling, What I Like About You (TV series), Ghost Whisperer and All Of Us. With other American Idol alumni, she appeared on The Tyra Banks Show in 2006.

She has starred on Broadway twice. In November 2004, Gray was cast for a limited engagement of twelve weeks in the role of Priya in Broadway's struggling Bombay Dreams. Due to continued poor grosses, the show closed early on January 1, 2005. She joined the cast of Rent as Mimi Marquez on May 29, 2007, and was scheduled to play the role until November 25, 2007, however, that six-month contract was extended. Gray performed in Rent until June 15, 2008, and was replaced by Renée Elise Goldsberry.

In October 2005, Gray made her big screen supporting role debut in the independent film The Gospel, which debuted at No. 5 at the box office, and also had strong DVD sales when it was released to stores on January 3, 2006. Gray has one song, "Now Behold the Lamb", featured on the movie's soundtrack, which climbed to No. 1 on Billboard's Soundtrack Chart. Her second movie role was in the 2008 movie Rachel Getting Married.

Also in 2005, Gray appeared in a short film for H&M's new line of denim jeans, and performed the Dreamgirls show stopper "And I Am Telling You I'm Not Going". Tamyra was featured in print advertisements for the H&M denim and her version of the song played in H&M stores.

In 2011, Gray starred in the musical "Twist," a theatrical version of Oliver Twist set in New Orleans during the Depression, that was produced by Debbie Allen at the Pasadena Playhouse in Pasadena, California. The musical was scheduled to run from June 14 to July 17, but was extended through July 24 due to strong ticket sales and a string of sold-out shows. In January 2016, she took over the role of Kate on the national tour of If/Then. On January 8, 2018, she took over the role of Papa Ge in the 2018 revival of Once on This Island.

== Acting credits ==
=== Film ===
Year	Title	Role	Notes
2005	The Gospel	Rain Walker	
2008	Rachel Getting Married	Singing Friend	

=== Television ===
Year	Title	Role	Notes
2003	Boston Public	Aisha Clemens	7 episodes
2003	Half & Half	Zora Kane	Episode: "The Big Foot in My Mouth Episode"
2004	Tru Calling	Carly Anders	Episode: "Death Becomes Her"
2004	What I Like About You	Danielle	2 episodes
2005	All of Us	Herself	Episode: "Creeping with the Enemy"
2006	Las Vegas	Patty	Episode: "Like A Virgin"

=== Theatre ===
Year	Title	Role	Notes
2004	Bombay Dreams	Priya	Replacement
2007	Rent	Mimi Marquez	Replacement
2018	Once on This Island	Papa Ge	Replacement
2019	Into the Woods	Cinderella's Mother/Granny	Hollywood Bowl

== Discography ==
=== Albums ===
Year	Album details	Peak chart positions		Certifications (sales threshold)
Year	Album details	US	US R&B	Certifications (sales threshold)
2004	The Dreamer: Released: May 6, 2004; Label: 19 Entertainment	23	16	US sales: 123,000
"—" denotes releases that did not chart

=== Singles ===
- "Raindrops Will Fall (H. Hector & J. Vasquez Mixes)" Number 5 Hot Dance Music/Club Play
- "Raindrops Will Fall (Remixes)" Number 9 Hot Dance Music/Club Play

Other songs

- "You Thought Wrong" (with Kelly Clarkson)
