= No Definite Answer =

Studio album by Sam Beeton
- Released: 9 March 2009 (UK)
- Recorded: 2007–2008
- Label: Sony BMG

Singles from No Definite Answer
- 1. "What You Look For" Released: 9 September 2008

No Definite Answer is the major-label debut album from British singer-songwriter, Sam Beeton. The album was released on iTunes on 26 September 2008 and was due to be released on CD on 29 September 2008, but was pushed back to January 2009. It was scheduled for release on 9 March 2009. It spawned Beeton's debut single, "What You Look For", which charted at No. 30 on the UK Singles Chart in its first week.

== Track listing ==
1. "What You Look For"
2. "Under the Fence"
3. "Time Takes Its Toll"
4. "Finally Gone"
5. "Best Friend"
6. "This Lullaby"
7. "Sweet Luigi"
8. "This Is Where We Are"
9. "Trouble and Strife"
10. "Cathy Lee"
11. "Mocha Mocha"
12. "Leaving It Till Last"
13. "Angels Gather Here"
14. "Blue Rose"
