= Killing My Darlings =

Studio album by Amanda Jenssen
- Released: May 7, 2008
- Genre: Pop, soul
- Length: 37:00
- Label: Epic
- Producer: Amanda Jenssen; Vincent Pontare; Marit Bergman; Per Wiksten

Amanda Jenssen chronology
| Killing My Darlings (2008) | Happyland (2009) |

Professional ratings
Review scores
| Source | Rating |
|---|---|
| Allmusic | 3.5/5 stars |

Killing My Darlings is the debut studio album from Swedish singer Amanda Jenssen, who rose to fame in Idol 2007. It was released in stores on May 7, 2008. The album received mostly highly positive remarks from the media. It sold platinum in Sweden during its first months in stores.

== Track listing ==
Swedish Edition
| No. | Title | Length |
|---|---|---|
| 1. | "For the Sun" | 3:29 |
| 2. | "Amarula Tree" | 3:02 |
| 3. | "Greetings from Space" | 5:16 |
| 4. | "Do You Love Me" | 3:34 |
| 5. | "So Far Away" | 3:34 |
| 6. | "Don't Worry" | 2:59 |
| 7. | "Darling, Go Home" | 2:50 |
| 8. | "Numb" | 3:32 |
| 9. | "Come On (You Have Arrived)" | 3:24 |
| 10. | "Rising Up" | 3:24 |
| 11. | "Our Last Goodbye" | 2:09 |

Bonus Tracks

iTunes Edition
| No. | Title | Length |
|---|---|---|
| 12. | "Maple Trees" | 1:34 |

== Charts ==
=== Weekly charts ===
| Chart (2008) | Peak position |
|---|---|
| Swedish Albums (Sverigetopplistan) | 1 |

=== Year-end charts ===
| Chart (2008) | Position |
|---|---|
| Swedish Albums (Sverigetopplistan) | 9 |

== Certifications ==
| Region | Certification | Certified units/sales |
|---|---|---|
| Sweden (GLF) | Platinum | 40,000^{^} |
^{^} Shipments figures based on certification alone.
