= Sam Beeton =

British singer-songwriter, musician and model

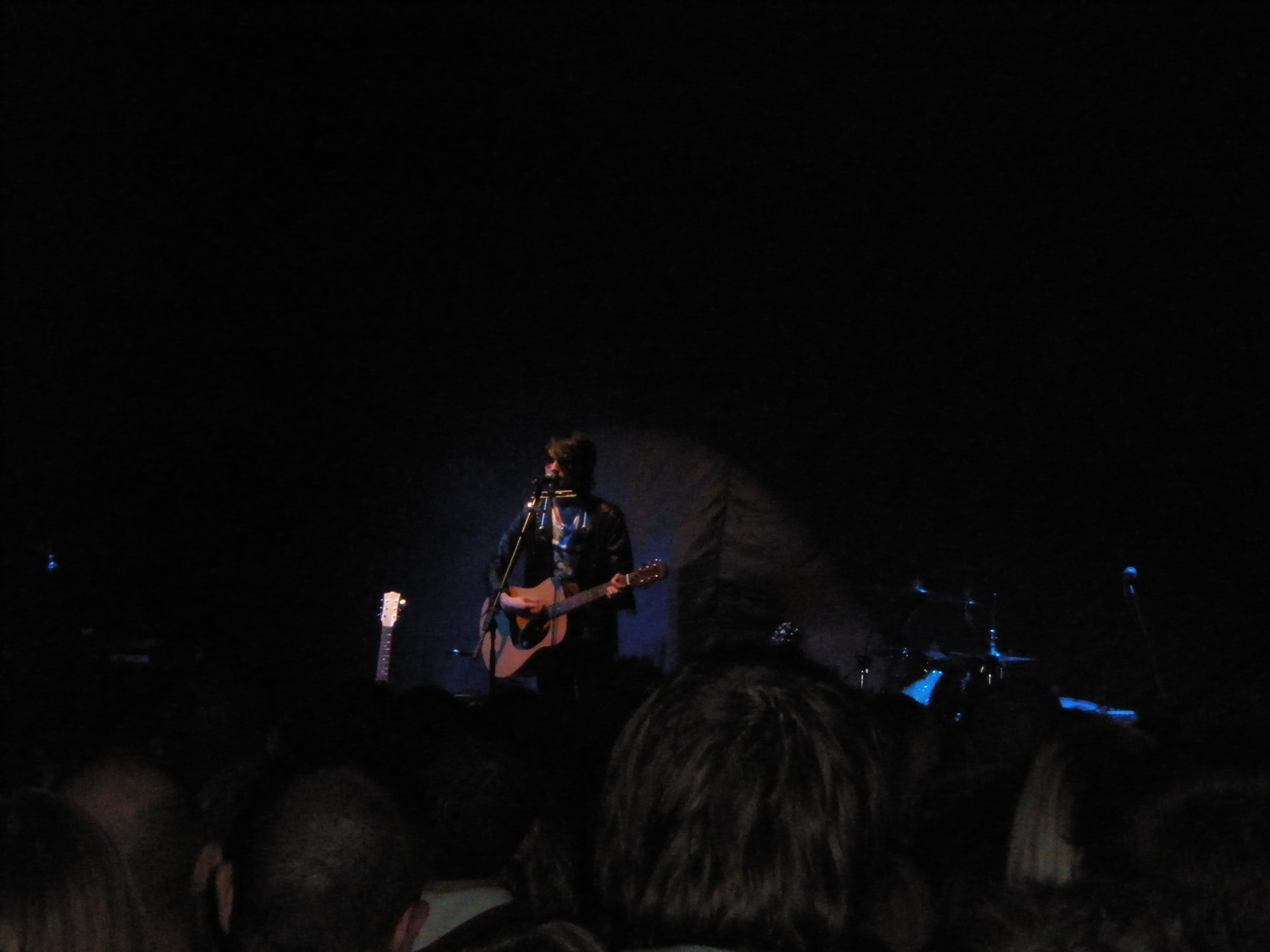
- Beeton supporting Scouting for Girls at the Doncaster Dome, November 2008

Background information
- Born: 13 September 1988 (age 38); Carlton, Nottinghamshire England
- Genres: Pop, soft rock, indie
- Occupations: Singer, songwriter, musician, model
- Instruments: Vocals, guitar, drums, bass, piano
- Years active: 2007–present
- Label: RCA Label Group
- Website: www.sambeeton.com

Sam Beeton (born Samuel John Beeton, 13 September 1988, Nottingham, England) is a British singer-songwriter and musician. He released his debut single "What You Look For" in September 2008, which reached number 30 in the UK Singles Chart in the week up to 20 September 2008. His first album, No Definite Answer, was released on iTunes in 2008.

== Early life ==
He attended Carlton le Willows School. Beeton was discovered while playing in a bar, The Old Volunteer he was still at school aged 14. Sam was signed to the Notts County FC School of Excellence and played for the youth teams for three years at left midfield.

He played in a local young recording band called The Drains who are still playing on the Nottingham circuit. Beeton is involved in local charities as The Julie Cotton Foundation. He always plays at the annual concert at Rock City. He has also modelled for the British fashion label Burberry, notably the Spring 2009 collection.

== Music career ==
Beeton was nominated for the Best Pop Act at the BT Digital Music Awards, and lost to Kylie Minogue. Sam Beeton has supported The Script, Sandi Thom, James Morrison, Scouting for Girls and Charlie Simpson on full UK tours and has also completed one UK tour in his own right. Beeton's first single had an unprecedented run as "record of the week" on the two shows Jo Whiley and Scott Mills of BBC Radio One consecutively.

== Discography ==
=== Albums ===
Year	Album	Chart positions
Year	Album	UK
2008	No Definite Answer: Released: 26 September 2008	-
2015	In The Yard: Released: 5 April 2015	–

=== Singles ===
Year	Single	Chart positions	Album
Year	Single	UK	Album
2008	"What You Look For"	30	No Definite Answer
2012	"Under the Fence"	–	Non-album singles
2012	"Storyteller"	–	Non-album singles
2015	"Can You Run?"	–	In the Yard
2015	"Belong"	–	In the Yard

=== Other releases ===
- First Takes (debut EP): released 5 March 2007
- Sam Beeton's Record Club (Season 1): released November 2010 – December 2011
- Sam Beeton's Record Club (Season 2): released May 2012
