= Amanda Jenssen =

Swedish singer and songwriter

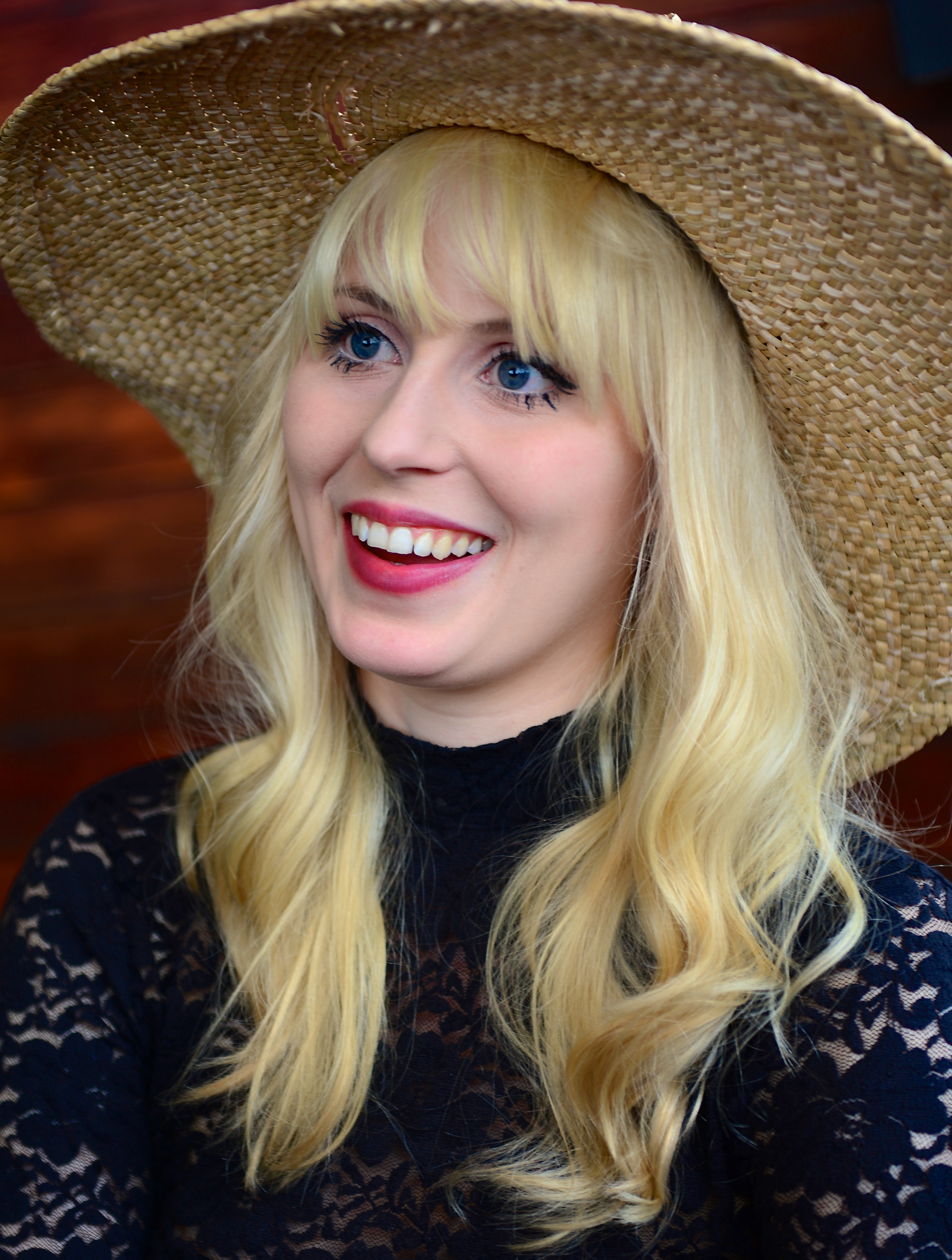
- Amanda Jenssen in 2013

Background information
- Born: Jenny Amanda Katarina Bengtsson; 12 September 1988 (age 38); Lund, Sweden
- Genres: Jazz, acoustic, soul
- Occupations: Singer, songwriter, musician
- Instruments: Vocals, guitar
- Years active: 2007–present
- Label: Sony BMG (2007–present)
- Website: Official website

Jenny Amanda Katarina Jenssen /jɛnsɛn/ (born 12 September 1988) is a Swedish singer and songwriter who first rose to prominence as the Swedish Idol 2007 runner-up. Her first album, Killing My Darlings (2008), became one of that year's best-selling albums in Sweden, peaking at number 1 on the Swedish album chart. She also had success with her music singles, with seven individual placements on the Swedish singles chart.

In November 2012, she released the album Hymns for the Haunted, which reached certified gold status in Sweden. In 2015, released her first Swedish-language album, Sånger från ön (English: Songs from the Island).

== Early life ==
Jenssen was born in Lund, Sweden in 1988. She expressed interest in music at a young age, and as a teenager was the lead vocalist in the bands Oh Hollie Neverdays and Amanda and the Papas which did covers of classic songs. Oh Hollie Neverdays composed original songs (Jenssen and guitarist, Viktor Rinneby). In May 2007 the group won the Swedish competition "Musik Direkt" and the prize was a tour in Gambia.

== Career ==
=== Idol experience ===
Jenssen entered the Idol 2007 talent show on TV4, early on becoming one of the favourites after some strong performances. In the end she finished second in the finale after going head to head with Marie Picasso on 7 December 2007 in Globen Arena in Stockholm. Jenssen lost to Marie Picasso but received 48.7% of the votes.

==== Idol performances ====
- "That's Alright Mama" (Arthur Crudup)
- "Dream a Little Dream"
- "Look What They've Done to My Song" (Melanie Safka)
- "Tainted Love" (Soft Cell)
- "Don't Hate on Me" (Vincent Pontare)
- "Born to Run" (Bruce Springsteen)
- "Baby Can I Hold You" (Tracy Chapman)
- "Disco Inferno" (The Trammps)
- "Suspicious Minds" (Mark James/Elvis Presley)
- "Just a Girl" (No Doubt)
- "You Really Got Me" (Ray Davies; The Kinks)
- "No One" (Alicia Keys)
- "Hallelujah" (Leonard Cohen)

=== Post-Idol career ===
On 3 January 2008, Jenssen announced that she had landed a record deal. Her first single, "Do You Love Me", was released in stores on 23 January the same year. The following single "Amarula Tree" (written by Jenssen and Pär Wiksten) was released on 16 April 2008.

Her debut album, Killing My Darlings, was released on 7 May 2008 and became one of the most sold albums of 2008 landing at number 1 on the Swedish album chart. The majority of the songs on the album were written by herself and together with Wiksten. Marit Bergman and Vincent Pontare also contributed with a song each. A nationwide tour in the summer and autumn of 2008 followed. She was backed up by members of Damn and her songwriting friend Wiksten. It was a huge success, and at the end of the summer she was voted Queen of the summer tours by Aftonbladet readers (the biggest Swedish evening paper).

In early 2009, Jenssen was nominated for a number of awards at the Swedish Grammy Awards and the P3-guld galan and at the Rockbjörnen and Gay galas she won. At Rockbjörnen for "This Year's Female Artist" and "This Year's Newcomer" and at Gaygalan she won "Artist of the Year".

After the success with her debut album Killing My Darlings, Jenssen returned to the studio to record her second album Happyland, which was slated for a release on 28 October 2009. Her first single from the album was "Happyland" and it debuted at number 3 on the Swedish Singles chart and at number 55 on the German Singles chart.

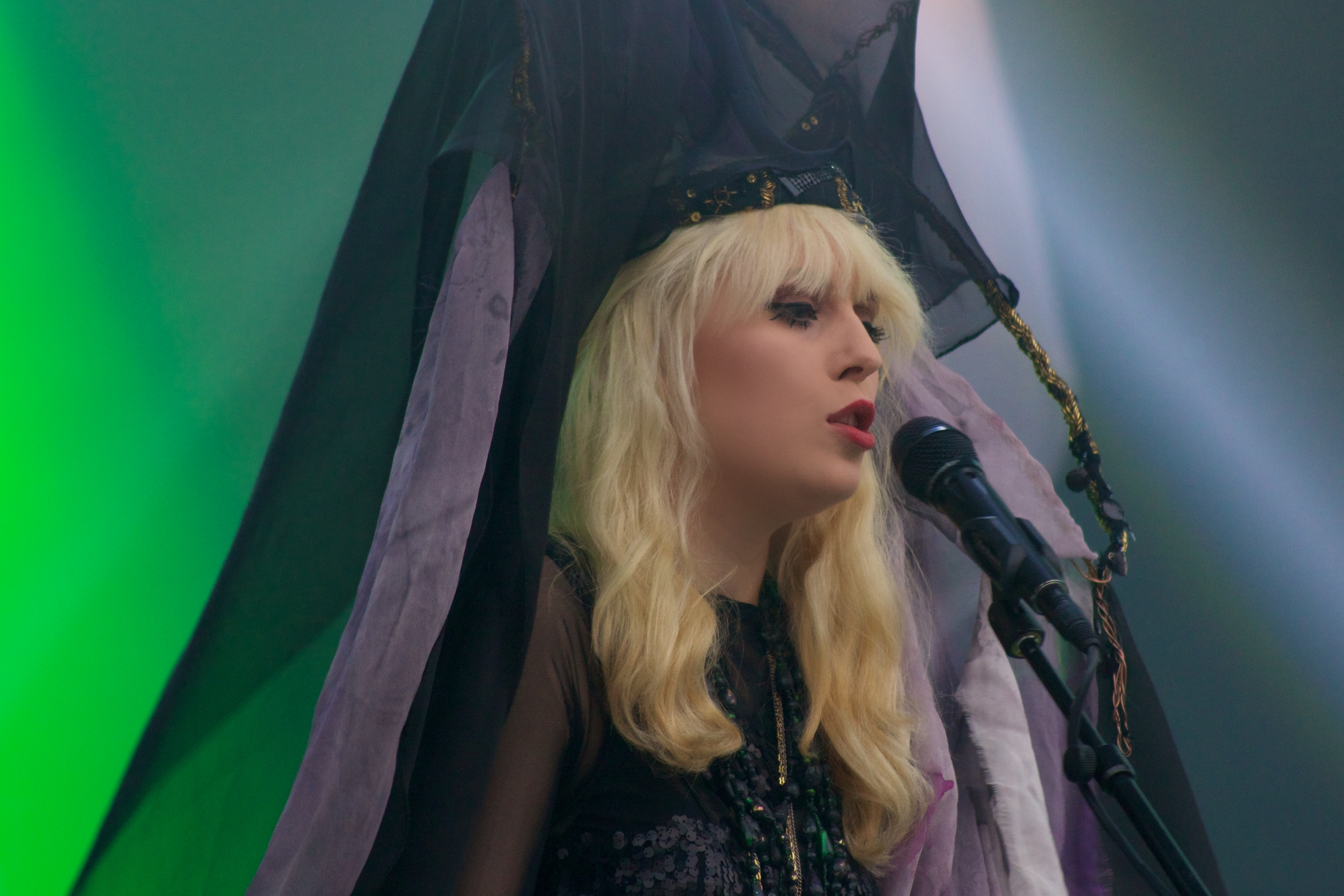
Jenssen performing at Gröna Lund theme park in Stockholm, 2013.

The album debuted at number three on the Swedish charts and was certified Gold status after just one week of album sales. The album was critically praised and it went on to win two Grammies for best female artist and best composer.

Jenssen's song "Do You Love Me" was played on 23 September 2008 in the beginning of the third episode of the American TV series Privileged. The episode was watched by about 1.8 million viewers in the US. "Our Time", a song from Happyland, was played on Dior's Haute Couture Fashion Show Spring Summer 2011. In May 2013, Jenssen performed a solo concert at Gröna Lund theme park in Stockholm. In late 2014 she took part in the television series Så mycket bättre which was broadcast on TV4.

=== Hymns for the Haunted ===
Jenssen's third album, Hymns for the Haunted, originally scheduled for release on 5 September 2012, was released on 14 November 2012 worldwide through Sony Music Entertainment. The album featured co-writing by Björn Yttling. Prior to its release, on 7 February 2012, a teaser video for Jenssen's new single "Dry My Soul" from the album appeared on YouTube. The full-length video was released on 14 February 2012, and was made available for streaming on her official website, and for purchase on the iTunes Store.

The track "The Carnival" from the album was featured in promotional material for American Horror Story: Freak Show on FX.

=== Sånger från ön ===
In 2015, Jenssen released her first album featuring Swedish-language tracks, titled Sånger från ön (Songs from the Island).

== Influences ==
Jenssen has cited a variety of influences, largely performers and musicians from the 1960s, including blues singers Bessie Smith, Billie Holiday and Ella Fitzgerald, as well as rock performers The Velvet Underground, the Kinks, and Bob Dylan.

== Discography ==
Amanda Jenssen discography
- Studio albums: 3
- Singles: 9
- Music videos: 4

=== Albums ===
Year	Album details	Peak chart positions				Certifications (sales thresholds)
Year	Album details	SWE	AUT	GER	SWI	Certifications (sales thresholds)
2008	Killing My Darlings: Released: 7 May 2008; Label: Epic Records; Formats: CD, digital download	1	—	—	—	SWE: Platinum
2009	Happyland: Released: 28 October 2009; Label: Epic Records; Formats: CD, digital download	3	55	43	68	SWE: 2× Platinum
2012	Hymns for the Haunted: Released 14 November 2012; Label: Sony Music Entertainment; Formats: CD, digital download, vinyl LP	2	—	—	—	SWE: Gold
2015	Sånger från ön: Released 2015; Label: Epic Records / Sony Music Entertainment; Formats:	25	—	—	—	

=== Singles ===
Year	Single	Peak chart positions				Album
Year	Single	SWE	AUT	GER	SWI	Album
2007	"Look What They've Done to My Song"	24	—	—	—	
2008	"Do You Love Me"	1	—	—	—	Killing My Darlings
2008	"Amarula Tree"	4	—	—	—	Killing My Darlings
2008	"Greetings from Space"	30	—	—	—	Killing My Darlings
2008	"Maple Trees"	60	—	—	—	Killing My Darlings
2009	"Another Christmas"	27	—	—	—	
2009	"Happyland"	3	75	55	75	Happyland
2024	"Santa"	42	—	—	—	Non-album single

Other releases

Year	Single	Peak chart positions	Album
Year	Single	SWE	Album
2014	"When We Dig for Gold in the USA"	4	Så mycket bättre - Season 5 - Orup Songs originally "När vi gräver guld i USA"
2014	"Calleth You, Cometh I"	29	Så mycket bättre - Season 5 - Ola Salo Songs
