= Hurt Locker (musical) =

Hurt Locker: The Musical is a fictional musical in the 2014 Broadway premiere production of Hedwig and the Angry Inch loosely inspired by the film of the same name. In the Broadway performance of Hedwig and the Angry Inch, the musical opens with Hedwig explaining that the musical only ran for a single night before closing during intermission, and that she has convinced a producer to let her perform in what would otherwise be an empty stage. Fake Playbills for the musical are used as props and are found scattered on the floor of the Belasco Theatre and contains advertisements for other fake musicals such as Gravity on Ice, Container Store: The Musical, The Entire Bible, and SoulCycle on Broadway. The Playbills, which describe the musical as having "explosions, negligible storytelling, camouflage and tits", also state that the musical's cast included actors such as Taye Diggs (who would go on to play the role of Hedwig in the summer of 2015) and that the music and lyrics were written by Metallica and Stephen R. Schwartz, which is the real name of Hedwig songwriter Stephen Trask.

Director Michael Mayer stated that they came up with the idea for Hurt Locker: The Musical as a way to explain Hedwig's presence in a Broadway theater. It was also used as a way to update the script to modern day as well as explain how Hedwig would be able to use such stage settings. Various newspapers have commented favorably on the faux Playbills, both an element of the musical and as a piece separate from the musical itself. The faux Playbills were written by writer-performers Mike Albo and Amanda Duarte, and designed by Rogers Eckersley Design.

== Fictional musical information ==
Hurt Locker: The Musical
- Music: Metallica; Stephen R. Schwartz
- Lyrics: Metallica; Stephen R. Schwartz
- Book: Tony Kushner; Brandon Nipp
- Basis: The Hurt Locker by Mark Boal

=== Musical numbers ===
==== Act I ====
- "Army of One" - James
- "Baghdad Mornin' (Hello, Hazmat)" - Company
- "Tick, Boom! (Bombs)" - James, Owen, Bomb Squad
- "Won't You Buy my Porn DVD? (Beckham's Lament)" - Beckham
- "Hot Desert Nights!" - Insurgent, Mala
- "Call Me After Call To Prayer" - James, Mala
- "Pain" - James, Sanborn, Company
- "What's With All These Goats?" - Sanborn, Goat, Company
- "When Love Explodes ('Love Theme from The Hurt Locker')" - James, Mala

==== Act II ====
- "Kevlar and Keffiyeh" - James, Mala
- "The Humvee With The Roof-Mounted Machine Gun On Top" - Company
- "When Love Explodes (Reprise)" - Owen
- "Can't Camouflage Love" - James, Owen, Sanborn
- "Your Body is The Bomb (Literally)" - James, Beckham
- "The Drone Song" - One-Armed Man
- "Mission Accomplished (With Your Body)" - James, Mala
- "When Love Explodes (Reprise)" - Ahmed, Goat

=== Cast ===
- Bobby Cannavale as Sergeant William James
- D'Bree Dazeem as Mala, an Iraqi girl (filling in for her sister Adele Dazeem, a reference to John Travolta's infamous mispronunciation of Idina Menzel at the 86th Academy Awards)
- Michael Cerveris as Specialist Owen Eldrige
- Taye Diggs as Sergeant J.T. Sanborn
- Abdul Batin as Insurgent / Interpreter / Ahmed / One-Armed Man / Goat
- Hunter Taylor Thompson-Tyler as Beckham, Kid selling DVDs
- Pepper Phillips as Bomb Squad Dancer 1
- Blaine Duboise as Bomb Squad Dancer 2
