= Hedwig and the Angry Inch (soundtrack) =

Hedwig and the Angry Inch: Original Cast Recording

Cast recording by Stephen Trask & John Cameron Mitchell
- Released: 1999 (Broadway cast recording); 2001 (motion picture soundtrack)
- Studios: The Magic Shop (1999); Bearsville (2001)
- Genre: Rock
- Labels: Atlantic (1999); Hybrid/Atlantic (2001)
- Producers: Brad Wood (1999); Stephen Trask (2001)

Hedwig and the Angry Inch is a 1998 musical about a fictional rock and roll band of the same name fronted by an East German genderqueer person, with a book by John Cameron Mitchell (who also played the title role in the original production and film), and music and lyrics by Stephen Trask. The musical has gathered a devoted cult following, and was adapted into the 2001 American musical film of the same name directed by Mitchell.

The cast recording was released in 1999 on Atlantic Records, featuring the original cast (John Cameron Mitchell, Stephen Trask, Miriam Shor, Scott Bilbrey, David McKinley, and Chris Weilding) performing all the tracks written for the stage musical. Hedwig's songs were also recorded for the 2001 film soundtrack by John Cameron Mitchell (lead vocals), Stephen Trask, Miriam Shor, Bob Mould (formerly of Hüsker Dü), Ted Liscinski, Perry L. James, Alexis Fleisig, and Eli Janney. Tommy Gnosis's songs were recorded by Stephen Trask (lead vocals), Miriam Shor, Bob Mould, Ted Liscinski, Perry L. James, Scott McCloud, Eli Janney, Alexis Fleisig, and Johnny Temple.

== Track listings ==
Off-Broadway soundtrack

1. "Tear Me Down"
2. "The Origin of Love"
3. "Random Number Generation" †
4. "Sugar Daddy"
5. "Angry Inch"
6. "Wig in a Box"
7. "Wicked Little Town"
8. "The Long Grift"
9. "Hedwig's Lament"
10. "Exquisite Corpse"
11. "Wicked Little Town (Reprise)"
12. "Midnight Radio"

Film soundtrack (This Soundtrack is not in Film-Performance Order)

1. "Tear Me Down"
2. "Origin of Love"
3. "Angry Inch"
4. "Wicked Little Town" (Tommy Gnosis Version) ‡
5. "Wig in a Box"
6. "The Long Grift"
7. "Hedwig's Lament"
8. "Exquisite Corpse"
9. "Midnight Radio"
10. "Nailed" †
11. "Sugar Daddy"
12. "Freaks" †
13. "In Your Arms Tonight" †
14. "Wicked Little Town" (Hedwig Version) ‡

Broadway revival soundtrack

1. "America the Beautiful" ៛
2. "Tear Me Down"
3. "The Origin of Love"
4. "Deutschlandlied" §
5. "Sugar Daddy"
6. "When Love Explodes (Love Theme from Hurt Locker: The Musical)"
7. "Angry Inch"
8. "Wig in a Box"
9. "Wicked Little Town"
10. "The Long Grift"
11. "Hedwig's Lament"
12. "Exquisite Corpse"
13. "Wicked Little Town (Reprise)"
14. "Midnight Radio"

† = Not a part of the show's score.
‡ = Also known as "Wicked Little Town" and "Wicked Little Town (Reprise)".
៛ = Usually included as an intro to "Tear Me Down", but here is an individual track.
§ = Usually included as an intro to "Sugar Daddy", but here is an individual track.

== Songs ==
Most of these songs were covered by major artists on the charity album Wig in a Box.

=== Tear Me Down ===
"Tear Me Down" is performed by the characters Hedwig (John Cameron Mitchell) and Yitzhak (Miriam Shor). It is the show's opening number. It contains a spoken section alluding to the construction of the Berlin Wall on August 13, 1961, and its fall on November 9, 1989.

==== Meaning ====
"Tear Me Down" introduces Hedwig as a person who has been, just like her home town of Berlin, "split in two". Most obviously she is part-male and part-female, but as the song progresses, we see that she is also a cross between conqueror and victim ("Enemies and adversaries, they try and tear me down"); spirituality and repugnance ("I rose ... like Lazarus" and "decorate/degrade me with blood, graffiti and spit"); accessibility and imprisonment ("Ain't much of a difference between a bridge and a wall").

Notably, Hedwig is compared to the divide between Communist East Germany and capitalist West Germany. Her personal crisis stems from the disparity between these two states and her inability to reconcile them, much as she cannot reconcile her new body ("I rose from off the doctor's slab").

==== Other versions ====
- The song was covered by the rock artist Meat Loaf on his 2003 album Couldn't Have Said It Better, adapting some of the lyrics (notably the spoken section about the Berlin Wall) so that the song is instead about Texas and Meat Loaf's own life. (Trask, who composed the music for Hedwig, was much influenced by Meat Loaf's albums when he was growing up. A deleted scene on the Hedwig DVD acknowledges the debt in a roundabout way, as we overhear Hedwig's manager Phyllis Stein (Andrea Martin) arguing about the band's sound on the phone: "MEAT LOAF..?! Bowie!")
- In the same year, the band Spoon covered the song, with Stephen Colbert reciting the spoken part originally performed by Miriam Shor, for a charity tribute album called Wig in a Box, released by Off Records.

=== Sugar Daddy ===
"Sugar Daddy" is performed in the musical by the characters Hedwig (John Cameron Mitchell) and Sgt. Luther Robinson (Maurice Dean Wint in the film).

The divide between Communist East Germany and the democratic Western World is illustrated in the numerous cultural references included in the song's lyrics; they underline the idea that Hedwig is living in the Communist world where dictators and violence are the norm, while across the wall, Luther (and the American food products, fashion items and technological advancements) represents the American Dream.

The song was performed by Neil Patrick Harris at the 2014 Tony Awards.

==== Covers ====
- Frank Black (Engineered by Joel Hamilton, Produced by Reid Paley, who also appears on guitar) on the charity tribute album Wig in a Box: Songs from & Inspired by Hedwig and the Angry Inch

=== Angry Inch ===
"The Angry Inch" is performed by John Cameron Mitchell. The song details the botched sex-change operation that Hedwig got in order to marry an American soldier and move to the United States. The eponymous "angry inch" is what remains of Hedwig's penis — "six inches forward and five inches back".

The song was covered by Type O Negative on the album Life is Killing Me. Sleater-Kinney and Fred Schneider also covered the song for Wig in a Box, a benefit album for the Hetrick-Martin Institute. Production of the album was documented in the 2006 film Follow My Voice: With the Music of Hedwig.

In the film, the song was performed at the fictional Bilgewater's and the song started a fight.

=== Wig in a Box ===
"Wig in a Box" is performed in the musical by the character Hedwig (John Cameron Mitchell) and her band The Angry Inch.

The titular wig in the box is the last present that Hedwig's husband Luther bought her, and the song concerns Hedwig listening to music and trying on wigs, which enables her to escape her present troubles and become whomever she wants. The part of the story in which this song appears is set in 1989, but the song contains references to sound recording (and playing) devices already outdated in 1989; they reflect the time period of each wig style and the character Hedwig assigns to it ("Miss Farah Fawcett on TV," "Miss Beehive 1963").

Covers

- The Polyphonic Spree on the charity tribute album Wig in a Box: Songs from & Inspired by Hedwig and the Angry Inch
- Lord of the Lost included a version on their 2023 cover album Weapons of Mass Seduction

=== The Origin of Love ===
"The Origin of Love" is based on a story from Plato's Symposium. In the Symposium, a party is being held in which a series of speeches are given paying homage to Eros, the Greek god of love. "The Origin of Love" is taken from the speech given by the playwright Aristophanes.

According to the speech, long ago, humans were composed of two people stuck back-to-back, with two faces and eight limbs. Male-male humans came from the Sun, female-female humans from the Earth and male-female humans from the Moon. The gods, out of jealousy, split them in half. Now, throughout our lives, we are always trying to find our "other half", and sexual intercourse is the only means we have to put the two halves back together; this desire to be one person again is what we call "love". However, it is impossible to fully rejoin two people because it is our souls and not our bodies that most desire to be reunited.

Trask says of the song's form: "When I started writing that song, the only way I could think to write it was as a picture book. So I wrote it, all the images in it, and the way the story gets told, as the language of, like, a Dr. Seuss picture book. If you read the lyrics out loud, they read like a picture book."

While taken from the story within the story in the Symposium, the song deliberately jumbles deities of different cultures (such as Zeus, Osiris, and Thor). It puts forward Hedwig's idea that humans have pre-destined soul mates, and that she is seeking hers. At the end of the film, Tommy addresses this idea in the reprise of the song "Wicked Little Town", arguing that no cosmic force controls our destiny ("And there's no mystical design, no cosmic lover preassigned"), and suggesting that she needs to move on.

According to the Internet Movie Database, and the DVD's commentary track, the vocals for this song as it appears in the film were recorded live.

The animation that accompanies the song in the film version was drawn by Emily Hubley.

==== Covers ====
- On the album Wig in a Box (a charity cover of the Hedwig soundtrack), "The Origin of Love" is covered separately by Rufus Wainwright and Jonathan Richman.
- Bonnie Pink included a version on her cover album Reminiscence

=== Wicked Little Town ===
"Wicked Little Town" is a poetic reflection on the doomed love between two of the characters, Hedwig and Tommy Gnosis. The original song is basically about a person who falls in love with someone in a wicked town that seems to be impossible to escape. In the story of Hedwig and the Angry Inch, Hedwig sings the tune as a love song to Tommy, while in the film, she is singing a version of the song when Tommy comes into a donut shop, and later in the film, a full, rock ballad reprise version has been created for Tommy to sing to Hedwig. After his relationship with Hedwig was revealed, Tommy sings that he is sorry for how much he has hurt Hedwig, that he never understood she was "more than a woman or a man" and that now he finally sees how much he took from her by stealing her songs. He also tells her that her ideas about soulmates and cosmic destiny are preventing her from moving on ("Maybe there's nothing up in the sky but air...") and then, wishing her well, he slips away into the darkness, leaving Hedwig in tears.

It is notable that a line in the song, "If you've got no other choice, you know you can follow my voice" is literally played out in the story, as Hedwig stalks Tommy around the country from concert to concert, "following his voice." It could also be said that Tommy followed Hedwig's voice, given his hero worship of her, his taking on of the Tommy Gnosis persona she devised, and his theft of her songs. When Tommy sings the reprise, he visually stops singing before the word "voice" though the word is still heard. The song continues to play, and Hedwig smiles in a reaction shot.

==== Covers ====
- The Tommy Gnosis Version
  - Ben Jelen on his album Give It All Away
  - The Bens on the charity tribute album Wig in a Box: Songs from & Inspired by Hedwig and the Angry Inch
  - Bright Light Bright Light on his EP Cinematography
- The Hedwig Version
  - The Breeders on the charity tribute album Wig in a Box: Songs from & Inspired by Hedwig and the Angry Inch
  - Soft Charisma on the album Life Inside The Robot Man

=== The Long Grift ===
"The Long Grift", in the film version, was cut except for the line "Look what you've done." In the stage version, the song is sung by Hedwig's husband Yitzhak, when Hedwig becomes overwhelmed with emotion and is unable to perform the song. The lyrics accuse Hedwig's former lover (Tommy Gnosis) of grifting her, singing: "I didn't want to know that your cool, seductive serenade // Is a tool of your trade, you gigolo." Hedwig concludes by deprecating the entirety of their love, singing "The love that had me in your grip // was just a long, long grift."

==== Covers ====
- They Might Be Giants on the charity tribute album Wig in a Box: Songs from & Inspired by Hedwig and the Angry Inch

=== Midnight Radio ===
"Midnight Radio'" is performed by John Cameron Mitchell in both the original off-Broadway play and the 2001 feature film. The song contains a number of references to the inspiring women of rock 'n roll, including Aretha Franklin, Yoko Ono, Nico, Patti Smith, Tina Turner, and Nona Hendryx.

==== Covers ====
- "Midnight Radio" was covered by Cyndi Lauper and Minus 5 (featuring Peter Buck of R.E.M.) on the 2003 charity album Wig in a Box.
- "Midnight Radio" was covered by Dar Williams on her 2008 release, Promised Land.
- "Midnight Radio" was covered by Underthings on their 2012 album Beautiful Grotesque.
