= Wig in a Box =

Wig In A Box: Songs from & Inspired by Hedwig and the Angry Inch

Compilation album by Various Artists
- Released: 2003
- Genre: Various
- Label: Off Records

Professional ratings
Review scores
Source	Rating
allmusic	4/5 stars

Wig In A Box: Songs from & Inspired by Hedwig and the Angry Inch is a charity tribute album featuring versions of songs from the musical Hedwig and the Angry Inch. It was released in 2003 through Off Records, and proceeds benefited the Hetrick-Martin Institute, which is the home of the Harvey Milk High School, a New York City public school for gay, lesbian, bisexual, transgender and even cisgender and/or straight youth who have experienced homophobic and gender identity discrimination and violence at home and/or in other public schools and who are at risk of not completing their secondary education.

Follow My Voice: With the Music of Hedwig, a documentary on the school and the making of the album was released in 2006.

== Track listing ==
1. "The Origin of Love" - Rufus Wainwright
2. "Angry Inch" - Sleater-Kinney and Fred Schneider of The B-52's
3. "The Long Grift" - They Might Be Giants
4. "Sugar Daddy" - Frank Black (Engineered by Joel Hamilton, Produced by Reid Paley, who also appears on guitar)
5. "City of Women" - Robyn Hitchcock
6. "Freaks" - Imperial Teen
7. "Wicked Little Town (Hedwig Version)" - The Breeders
8. "Nailed" - Bob Mould
9. "Wig in a Box" - The Polyphonic Spree
10. "Milford Lake" - John Cameron Mitchell and Stephen Trask
11. "Ladies & Gentlemen" - Stephen Colbert
12. "Tear Me Down" - Spoon
13. "Hedwig's Lament/Exquisite Corpse" - Yoko Ono and Yo La Tengo
14. "Wicked Little Town (Tommy Gnosis Version)" - The Bens
15. "Midnight Radio" - Cyndi Lauper and Minus 5 (featuring Peter Buck of REM)
16. "The Origin of Love" (reprise) - Jonathan Richman

== History ==
In 2003, Chris Slusarenko of Off Records produced and released a charity tribute album which also included new material adding to the mythology of Hedwig. Slusarenko said that he fielded questions from Kim Deal of The Breeders about Frank Black, her former bandmate in Pixies, with whom she'd had limited conversation since the band's breakup in 1993. They made contact soon after, and Pixies reunited the following spring. Trask and Mitchell recorded a Tommy Gnosis song, written for this album and based on an unfinished snippet from the show's development days, called "Milford Lake" (sung by Mitchell) and included it. The CD also features comedian Stephen Colbert reciting the spoken introduction to "Tear Me Down".
