= B3 (band) =

American band

Background information
- Origin: New York, NY, USA
- Genres: Teen pop, dance-pop, pop rock
- Years active: 2001–2004
- Past members: Timothy Andrew Cruz (2001–2004); John Steven Sutherland (2001–2004); Rod Michael (2001–2002); Blair Madison Late (2002–2004)

B3 was an American pop boy band from New York City. They were formed in 2001 and were first produced by O-Jay of German dance band Real McCoy. Original members were Timothy Andrew Cruz (2001–2004), John Steven Sutherland (2001–2004) and Rod Michael (2001–2002). When Michael left in 2002, Blair Madison Late (2002–2004) joined in. Tim Cruz was previously, in the late 1990s, a member of the boy band React.

B3 was best known in Germany and had most of their hits in the German charts. They remained active until 2004, also participating in the Four Seasons Tour in 2002. The band released three albums and had a number of singles. Their first album entitled First went gold in Germany. They also had a collaboration with singer Ji-In Cho who released a duet with B3. After the band split in December 2004, John Steven Sutherland and Tim Cruz went solo signing with Fearless Management.

== Members ==
The original band members from 2001 until 2002 were:

- Timothy Andrew Cruz (born in New York City, New York on 2 January 1979)
- Rod Michael (born in Allentown, Pennsylvania on 17 February 1986)
- John Steven Sutherland (born 11 March 1983)

In 2002, Michael left and Blair Madison Late joined in making the band's composition from 2002 to 2004 as follows:

- Timothy Andrew Cruz
- Blair Madison Late (born in Odessa, Texas on 18 April 1982)
- John Steven Sutherland

== Discography ==
=== Albums ===
Year	Title	Peak Chart Position	
Year	Title	AUT	GER
2002	First: Released: February 2002; Record label:	49	15
2003	N.Y.B3: Released: March 2003; Record label:	41	12
2004	Living for the Weekend: Released: September 2004; Record label:	–	57

Others

- 2003: N.Y.B3 Special Edition

=== Singles ===
Year	Title	Peak Chart Position		
Year	Title	AUT	GER	SUI
2001	"You Win Again"	15	19	84
2002	"Nightfever"	35	31	95
2002	"I.O.I.O."	5	4	24
2002	"Tonight and Forever"	23	10	91
2003	"You're My Angel"	37	13	–
2003	"We Got the Power"	47	41	–
2003	"All the Girls"	–	11	56
2004	"Move Your Body "	–	33	–
2004	"Can't Fight the Feeling"	–	43	–
