= React (band) =

American boy band

REACT was an American boy band made up of Tim Cruz and Daniel Meteryeon.

REACT had a Top 10 hit on the dance charts with "Let's Go All The Way". After REACT disbanded, its member Tim Cruz joined yet another boy band, a success internationally, particularly in Germany called B3. B3 had a string of hits between 2001 and 2004 and now Tim Cruz is signed as a solo act to Fearless Management.

== Discography ==
=== Albums ===
- 1998: "React"

=== Singles ===
- 1998: "Let's Go All The Way"
- 1998: "Can't Keep My Hands Off You" #43 R&R Pop

== See also ==
- B3 (band)
