= Hedwig and the Angry Inch (musical) =

Rock musical

- Off-Broadway promotional poster
- Music: Stephen Trask
- Lyrics: Stephen Trask
- Book: John Cameron Mitchell
- Productions: 1998 Off-Broadway; 2000 West End; 2004 West End revival 2005 UK tour 2014 Broadway; 2016 US tour
- Awards: Obie Award; Outer Critics Circle Award for Outstanding Off-Broadway Musical; Tony Award for Best Revival of a Musical

Hedwig and the Angry Inch is a rock musical with music and lyrics by Stephen Trask and a book by John Cameron Mitchell. The musical follows Hedwig Robinson, the genderqueer East German singer of a fictional rock and roll band. The story draws on Mitchell's life as the child of a U.S. Army major general who once commanded the U.S. sector of occupied West Berlin. The character of Hedwig was inspired by a German divorced U.S. Army wife who was Mitchell's family babysitter and moonlighted as a sex worker at her trailer park home in Junction City, Kansas. The music is steeped in the androgynous 1970s glam rock style of David Bowie (who co-produced the Los Angeles production of the show), as well as the work of John Lennon and early punk performers Lou Reed and Iggy Pop.

The musical opened off-Broadway in 1998, and won the Obie Award and Outer Critics Circle Award for Best Off-Broadway Musical. The production ran for two years, and was remounted with various casts by the original creative team in other US cities. Following a West End production in 2000, the musical was produced throughout the world in hundreds of stage productions.

The show's first Broadway incarnation, opening April 2014 at the Belasco Theatre, won Best Revival of a Musical at the 68th Tony Awards. The Broadway closing in September 2015 was followed by a U.S. national tour, launching at San Francisco's Golden Gate Theatre in October 2016 and ending at the Kennedy Center in July 2017.

== History ==
The character of Hedwig was originally a supporting character in the piece. She was loosely inspired by a German female babysitter/sex worker who worked for Mitchell's family when he was a teenager in Junction City, Kansas. The character of Tommy, originally conceived as the main character, was based on Mitchell himself: both were gay, the child of an army general, deeply Roman Catholic, and fascinated with mythology. Hedwig became the story's protagonist when Trask encouraged Mitchell to showcase their earliest material in 1994 at NYC's drag-punk club Squeezebox, where Trask headed the house band and Mitchell's boyfriend, Jack Steeb, played bass.

They agreed the piece should be developed through band gigs in clubs rather than in a theater setting in order to preserve a rock energy. Mitchell was deeply influenced by Squeezebox's roster of drag performers who performed rock covers. The setlists of Hedwig's first gigs included many covers with lyrics rewritten by Mitchell to tell Hedwig's story: Fleetwood Mac's "Oh Well"; Television's "See No Evil"; Wreckless Eric's "Whole Wide World"; Yoko Ono's "Death of Samantha"; Pere Ubu's "Non-Alignment Pact"; Cher's "Half Breed"; David Bowie's "Boys Keep Swinging"; Mott the Hoople's "All the Young Dudes"; and the Velvet Underground's "Femme Fatale." A German glam rendition of Debby Boone's "You Light Up My Life" once served as the musical's finale.

Mitchell's second gig was as fill-in host at Squeezebox on a bill featuring singer Deborah Harry of Blondie. It was for this occasion that Mike Potter first designed Hedwig's trademark wig, which was initially constructed from toilet paper rolls wrapped with synthetic blond hair. Mitchell, Trask, and the band Cheater (Jack Steeb, Chris Wielding, Dave McKinley, and Scott Bilbrey) continued to workshop material at venues such as Fez Nightclub and Westbeth Theater Center for four years before premiering the completed musical Off-Broadway in 1998.

Mitchell, who himself (Note: Mitchell continues to use he/him pronouns.) came out as non-binary in 2022, has explained that Hedwig is not a trans woman, but a genderqueer character. "She's more than a woman or a man," he has said. "She's a gender of one and that is accidentally so beautiful." He also stated that, while Hedwig is meant to be a queer voice, she is not meant to be specifically transgender: "[The sex change operation is] not a choice. Hedwig doesn't speak for any trans community, because she was ... mutilated."

== Synopsis ==
The concept of the stage production is that the audience is watching genderqueer rock singer Hedwig Robinson's musical act as she follows rockstar Tommy Gnosis' (much more successful) tour around the country. Occasionally Hedwig opens a door onstage to listen to Gnosis's concert, which is playing in an adjoining venue. Gnosis is recovering from an incident that nearly ruined his career, having crashed his car into a school bus while high and receiving oral sex from none other than Hedwig. Capitalizing on her notoriety from the incident, Hedwig determines to tell the audience her story ("Tear Me Down").

She is aided and hindered by her assistant, back-up singer and husband, Yitzhak. A Jewish drag queen from Zagreb, Yitzhak has an unhealthy, codependent relationship with Hedwig. Hedwig verbally abuses him throughout the evening, and it becomes clear that she is threatened by his natural talent, which eclipses her own. She describes how she agreed to marry him only after extracting a promise from him to never perform as a woman again, and he bitterly resents her treatment of him. (To further the musical's theme of blurred gender lines, Yitzhak is often played by a female actor.)

Hedwig tells her life story, which began when she was Hansel Schmidt, a "slip of a girlyboy" growing up in East Berlin. Raised by an emotionally distant single mother after her father, an American soldier, abandoned the family, Hansel takes solace in her love of western rock music. She becomes fascinated with a story called "The Origin of Love", based on Aristophanes's speech in Plato's Symposium. It explains that three sexes of human beings once existed: "children of the Sun" (man and man attached), "children of the Earth" (woman and woman attached), and "children of the Moon" (man and woman attached). Each were once round, two-headed, four-armed, and four-legged beings. Angry gods split these early humans in two, leaving the separated people with a lifelong yearning for their other half. Hansel is determined to search for her other half, but is convinced she will have to travel to the West to do so.

This becomes possible when, in her 20s, she meets Luther Robinson, an American soldier ("Sugar Daddy") who convinces her to begin dressing in drag. Luther falls in love with Hansel and the two decide to marry. This plan will allow Hansel to leave communist East Germany for the capitalist West. Hansel's mother, Hedwig, gives Hansel her name and passport and finds a doctor to perform a genital reassignment surgery. However, the operation is botched, and Hansel's surgically constructed vagina heals closed, leaving Hedwig with a dysfunctional one-inch mound of flesh between her legs, "with a scar running down it like a sideways grimace on an eyeless face" ("Angry Inch").

Hedwig goes to live in Junction City, Kansas, as Luther's wife. On their first wedding anniversary, Luther leaves Hedwig for a man. That same day, it is announced that the Berlin Wall has fallen and Germany will reunite, meaning Hedwig's sacrifice was for nothing. Hedwig recovers from the separation by creating a more glamorous, feminine identity for herself ("Wig in a Box") and forming a rock band she calls The Angry Inch.

Hedwig befriends the brother of a child she babysits, shy and misunderstood Christian teenager Tommy Speck, who is fascinated by a song she writes with him in mind ("Wicked Little Town"). They collaborate on songs and begin a relationship. Their songs are a success, and Hedwig gives him the stage name Tommy Gnosis. Hedwig believes that Tommy is her soulmate and that she cannot be whole without him, but he is disgusted when he discovers her "inch" and abandons her ("The Long Grift"). He goes on to become a wildly successful rock star with the songs Hedwig wrote alone and with him. The "internationally ignored" Hedwig and her band the Angry Inch are forced to support themselves by playing coffee bars and dives.

Hedwig grows more erratic and unstable as the evening progresses, until she finally breaks down, stripping off her wig, dress, and make-up, forcing Yitzhak to step forward and sing ("Hedwig's Lament"/"Exquisite Corpse"). At the height of her breakdown, she seems to transform into Tommy Gnosis, who both begs for and offers forgiveness in a reprise of the song she wrote for him ("Wicked Little Town (Reprise)"). Hedwig, out of costume, finds acceptance within herself, giving her wig to Yitzhak. At peace, Hedwig departs the stage as Yitzhak takes over her final song, dressed fabulously in drag ("Midnight Radio").

== Songs ==
Even though Yitzhak sings backup on almost all numbers in the show, the songs below that are labeled with Hedwig with Yitzhak are ones where he has notable solo lines. The show is performed without an intermission.

- "Tear Me Down" – Hedwig with Yitzhak
- "The Origin of Love" – Hedwig
- "Sugar Daddy" – Hedwig with Yitzhak
- "Angry Inch" – Hedwig
- "Wig in a Box" – Hedwig
- "Wicked Little Town" – Hedwig
- "The Long Grift" – Yitzhak/Skszp ‡
- "Hedwig's Lament" – Hedwig
- "Exquisite Corpse" – Hedwig with Yitzhak
- "Wicked Little Town (Reprise)" – Tommy §
- "Midnight Radio" – Hedwig

‡ In the original off-Broadway production, this song was sung by the musical director Skszp; in the 2014 Broadway revival, Yitzhak sings the song instead.

§ This song is performed by the character Tommy Gnosis, who is meant to be portrayed by the same actor as Hedwig.

A song performed by Yitzhak and the band, "Random Number Generation" was included on the Off-Broadway Cast Album, but does not appear in the score. The Broadway production had the song prepared to play in case Hedwig had to leave the stage, along with "Freaks", a song from the movie. Lena Hall performed the song at her final show during the sound check.

In the 2014 Broadway Revival, a small subplot was added to the script, and a small number was added to support it. Parodying The Hurt Locker Hedwig explains that a musical version of the story only ran for a single night before closing during intermission, and that she has convinced a producer to let her perform in what would otherwise be an empty stage. At one point Hedwig finds the theme for a song from the show, "When Love Explodes" and lets Yitzhak sing it, but stops him before he can sing the last note (the one exception being Lena Hall's final night). Yitzhak sings the entire song (including a missing verse) in the Revival Cast Album.

== Casts and characters ==
Character	Off-Broadway	London	Broadway	U.S. National Tour
Character	1998	2000	2014	2016
Hedwig	John Cameron Mitchell	Michael Cerveris	Neil Patrick Harris	Darren Criss
Yitzhak	Miriam Shor	Elizabeth Marsh	Lena Hall	Lena Hall

=== Notable Replacements ===
Off-Broadway (1998–2000)

- Hedwig: Michael Cerveris, Donovan Leitch, Ally Sheedy, Kevin Cahoon, Matt McGrath

Broadway (2014–15)

- Hedwig: Andrew Rannells, Michael C. Hall, John Cameron Mitchell, Darren Criss, Taye Diggs
- Yitzhak: Shannon Conley, Rebecca Naomi Jones

U.S. National Tour (2016–17)

The first national tour for the Broadway production premiered Oct 02, 2016 at San Francisco's Golden Gate Theatre before departing on the national tour with replacement casting.

- Hedwig: Euan Morton, Mason Alexander Park, Lena Hall
- Yitzhak: Hannah Corneau, Shannon Conley

== Productions ==
Actors who have played Hedwig onstage in the U.S. include Michael Cerveris, Neil Patrick Harris, Lena Hall, Darren Criss, Taye Diggs, Andrew Rannells, Michael C. Hall, Ally Sheedy, Euan Morton, Kevin Cahoon, Gene Dante, Anthony Rapp, Matt McGrath, Jeff Skowron, Nick Garrison, Treasure Treasure, and iOTA. Other notable figures who have portrayed Hedwig include Donovan Leitch, the glam-rocker son of sixties folk-rock composer Donovan. RuPaul's Drag Race season 5 winner Jinkx Monsoon also portrayed Hedwig in a Seattle production in 2013. Divina de Campo appeared as Hedwig in the 2022 regional tour.

=== Off-Broadway ===
Original Off-Broadway poster art

Hedwig and the Angry Inch premiered Off-Broadway at the Jane Street Theatre on February 14, 1998, and closed on April 9, 2000, after 857 performances. Direction was by Peter Askin and musical staging by Jerry Mitchell, with Hedwig initially played by John Cameron Mitchell and Yitzhak played by Miriam Shor. The theater was located in the ballroom of the Hotel Riverview, which once housed the surviving crew of the Titanic (a fact which figured in the original production).

Actors who played Hedwig in this Off-Broadway production included Michael Cerveris, Donovan Leitch, Ally Sheedy, Kevin Cahoon, Asa Somers, and Matt McGrath.

The Off-Broadway production won the Obie Award, 1998 Special Citations for Stephen Trask and the casts and the Outer Critics Circle Award for Best Off-Broadway Musical.

=== United Kingdom ===
Hedwig and the Angry Inch opened in the West End at the Playhouse Theatre on September 19, 2000, and closed on November 4, 2000, with Michael Cerveris.

In the summer of 2010, the show was staged at the George Square Theatre in Edinburgh, Scotland, as part of the Edinburgh Fringe Festival.

The show was also performed at the Edinburgh Fringe in 2015 at Greenside @ Royal Terrace by young company A Wicked Little Town with a positive reception.

In April 2022 a revival starring Divina de Campo as Hedwig and Elijah Ferreira as Yitzhak, directed by Jamie Fletcher opened at the Leeds Playhouse before transferring to HOME, Manchester. It was nominated for three WhatsOnStage Awards, including best performance for de Campo and best set design.

David Binder, who produced the 2014 Broadway revival of Hedwig, announced plans in 2023 to bring the same production to the West End. John Cameron Mitchell had previously revealed plans for a West End transfer of the same production in 2015, although this never came to fruition.

In July 2025, John Cameron Mitchell revealed in an interview that a new production will come to London. Speculation about casting included Neil Patrick Harris, Ewan McGregor, and newcomer actor Roi Dolev, who previously played Hedwig in Tel Aviv.

=== Australia ===
Hedwig and the Angry Inch had its Australian premiere at The Clarendon Guest House in Katoomba with a special out of town season playing from July 7–28, 2006. The season sold out and the production moved to Sydney opening on August 9, 2006, at Newtown on Enmore Road after the initial season of 4 weeks was extended and played a sold out 12-week season. The production moved to Melbourne for a 4-week season at the Athenaeum Theatre. The production was produced by David M. Hawkins with choreography by Ross Coleman starring iOTA as Hedwig and Blazey Best as Yitzak. The production returned to Sydney for a 12-week season at the Tom Mann Theatre in Surry Hills. It won a Helpmann Award for Best Actor In A Musical for iOTA, a Sydney Theatre Awards for Best Musical, Best New Artist for iOTA, and A Green Room Award for Best Actor In A Musical for iOTA.

In 2008 the production toured to QPAC in Brisbane with the role of Hedwig played by Michael Falzon and the role of Yitzak by Lucinda Shaw. A season was also presented at The Metro Theatre in Sydney with the same cast.

A cast recording was released of the Original Australian cast in 2007 with iOTA and Blazey Best.

In 2025, a new Australian tour produced by GWB Entertainment featured Seann Miley Moore in the role of Hedwig and Adam Noviello in the role of Yitzhak, playing in Adelaide for the 2025 Adelaide Festival, Melbourne for the 2025 Rising Festival, and Sydney.

=== Austria ===
On March 23, 2006, Hedwig and the Angry Inch premiered at Metropol Wien in Vienna, with Andreas Bieber as Hedwig and Anke Fiedler as Yitzhak; director and costume design by Torsten Fischer; drummer Markus Adamer; bass guitarist Matthias Petereit; guitarist Harry Peller; guitar and keyboards by Bernhard Wagner; and German translation by Gerd Koester and Herbert Schaefer.

In January, May, June 2023, and October 2024, as well as February/March 2026 Drew Sarich performed as Hedwig in Das Vindobona in Vienna with Ann Mandrella as Yitzhak; director Werner Sobotka; costume design by Metamorkid; drummer Titus Vadon; bass guitarist Harald Baumgartner; guitarist Chris Harras; keyboard and guitar by Felix Reischl; and German version by Wolfgang Böhmer and Rüdiger Bering.

=== Brazil ===
In August 2010, a Brazilian adaptation of Hedwig and the Angry Inch premiered in Rio de Janeiro, with Paulo Vilhena and Pierre Baitelli playing Hedwig. This was the first adaptation where there were two actors simultaneously playing Hedwig onstage. The play was translated by Jonas Calmon Klabin and directed by Evandro Mesquita, with musical direction by Danilo Timm and Evandro Mesquita. Eline Porto played Yitzhak, Alexandre Griva on the drums, Fabrizio Iorio on the keyboards, Patrick Laplan on the bass, and Pedro Nogueira playing the guitar.

The musical previews ran from August 10 to September 3, 2010, and the full show ran from September 15 to November 6, 2010, totaling 46 performances.

The same production reopened in São Paulo on August 26, 2011, and ran until October 16, 2011, for a total of 25 performances, now with actors Pierre Baitelli and Felipe Carvalhido playing Hedwig. Eline Porto played Yitzhak, Diego Andrade on the drums, Fabrizio Iorio on the keyboards, Melvin Ribeiro on the bass, and Pedro Nogueira playing the guitar. Nominated for Best Actor (Pierre Baitelli) and Best Musical direction (Danilo Timm and Evandro Mesquita) at the Prêmio Shell de Teatro. Winner of Best Actor (Pierre Baitelli and nominated for Best Production, Best Director (Evandro Mesquita), and Best Actress (Eline Porto) at the Prêmio Arte Qualidade Brasil. Also, one nomination for Best Musical in a Brazilian adaptation for the Prêmio Contigo de Teatro.

This same production performed again in Rio de Janeiro from April 4–22, 2012, and a tour to Curitiba, performing April 26–29, 2012, for a total of 16 performances. On November 24, 2012, John Cameron Mitchell performed a concert with the Brazilian Hedwig cast and guests and there were another two performances of Hedwig in Rio, November 23 and 25, and 4 performances in Fortaleza, November 29, 30, December 1 and 2, 2012. There were another 7 performances scheduled for February 2014 in Brasília and Recife, finalizing the Brazilian Hedwig project with a total of 100 performances.

In March 2023 it was announced by the actor Gustavo Essbich that he will be playing on a limited run the titular role of Hedwig and Tuany Aveline as Yitzhak. The premiere will be in the city of Porto Alegre, Rio Grande do Sul (south of Brazil), and later will be transferred to São Paulo.

=== Canada ===
The Canadian premiere was in 2001 in Toronto starring Ted Dykstra, with musical direction by Moe Berg of The Pursuit of Happiness.

The show premiered in Western Canada with simultaneous productions in Edmonton and Vancouver in April 2003. The Theatre Network production in Edmonton—directed by Bradley Moss and featuring Michael Scholar Jr. as Hedwig and Rachael Johnston as Yitzhak—opened April 1 and was held over until April 27. In Vancouver, Hoarse Raven Theatre's production, directed by Michael Fera, opened April 4 featuring Greg Armstrong-Morris as Hedwig and Meghan Gardiner as Yitzhak, and was held over until June 7. Further productions in Canada included a sold out 2007 production by Pickled Productions, and a 2009 Toronto production by Ghost Light Projects.

From October 2 through to November 2, 2013, Ghost Light Projects returned the production to Vancouver for a five-week engagement at The Cobalt. This production starred Ryan Alexander McDonald as Hedwig and Lee McKeown as Yitzhak, with music direction by Juno Award winner Mark Reid and direction by Randie Parliament and Greg Bishop.

=== Romania ===
A Romanian production of Hedwig and the Angry Inch opened the 21st of March 2023, in Bucharest, at Teatrul Metropolis, staged by Teatrul Stela Popescu. It is directed and choreographed by Răzvan Mazilu, with the dialogue translated by Carmen Stanciu, the lyrics translated by Alex Ștefănescu, and the set design by Adriana Grand. It stars Lucian Ionescu and Tudor-Cucu Dumitrescu alternating as Hedwig and Ana-Maria Ivan and Crina Matei alternating as Yitzhak.

=== Czech Republic ===
In spring of 2011, English-language Prague theatre AKANDA staged Hedwig and the Angry Inch at Iron Curtain Club, with Jeff Fritz as Hedwig and Uliana Elina as Yitzhak.

=== Germany ===
Several productions were shown in Frankfurt/Main in 2008, 2009, 2010 and 2011 and Berlin in 2002, 2013 and 2014. A new production premiered in Bremen on June 19, 2014.

Cologne

- September 10, 1999, Premiere at Halle Kalk under the direction of Torsten Fischer. Gerd Köster translated the piece together withset designer Herbert Schäfer and played the title role. Frank Hocker took over the musical direction and played the guitarist "Skshp". 70 performances, guest appearance at the theater festival in Berlin.

Berlin

- October 3, 2002 – November 20, 2002 – Glashaus der Arena Berlin (with Drew Sarich – Hedwig, Director: Rhys Martin)
- May 30, 2013 – August 31, 2013 Admiralspalast Klub (with Sven Ratzke – Hedwig, Guntbert Warns – Director)
- September 17, 2014 – September 20, 2014 BKA Theater of Berlin (with Sven Ratzke – Hedwig, Guntbert Warns – Director)
- February 25, 2014 – February 29, 2014 BKA Theater of Berlin (with Sven Ratzke - Hedwig, Guntbert Warns - Director)
- March 18, 2014 – March 21, 2014 BKA Theater of Berlin (with Sven Ratzke - Hedwig, Guntbert Warns - Director)
- February 19, 2015 – February 23, 2015 BKA Theater of Berlin (with Sven Ratzke - Hedwig, Guntbert Warns - Director)
- March 19, 2015 – March 23, 2015 BKA Theater of Berlin (with Sven Ratzke - Hedwig, Guntbert Warns - Director)
- October 18, 2016 – October 22, 2016 BKA Theater of Berlin (with Sven Ratzke - Hedwig, Guntbert Warns - Director)
- November 16, 2016 – November 20, 2016 BKA Theater of Berlin (with Sven Ratzke - Hedwig, Guntbert Warns - Director)
- September 14, 2020- June 20, 2022, Renaissance Theater of Berlin (with Sven Ratzke - Hedwig, Guntbert Warns - Director)
- September 26, 2022- June 28, 2023, Renaissance Theater of Berlin (with Sven Ratzke - Hedwig, Guntbert Warns - Director)

Hamburg

- November 8, 2016 – November 13, 2016 Schmidts Tivoli (with Sven Ratzke – Hedwig, Guntbert Warns – Director)

Frankfurt

- February 2008 (with Nigel Francis – Hedwig)
- November 20, 2009 – December 20, 2009 – Sinkkasten
- November 20, 2010 – January 8, 2011 – Nachtleben
- August 19, 2011 – August 21, 2011 – Neues Theater Hoechst (with Nigel Francis – Hedwig and Diana Nagel – Yitzak)
- On September 22, 2017, a new production of Hedwig and the Angry Inch, directed by Thomas Helmut Heep and starring Michael Kargus as Hedwig, Kathrin Hanak as Yitzhak, and Lukas Witzel as alternate Hedwig, opened at the 200-seat venue Brotfabrik in Frankfurt.

Bremen

- On June 19, 2014, a German adaptation of Hedwig and the Angry Inch premiered at Schwankhalle in Bremen, with actors Pascal Nöldner as Hedwig and Birgit Corinna Lange as Yitzhak. Carsten Sauer (keyboard), Denni Fischer (bass), Keule (guitar), and Norman Karlsen (drums) were in the band. The director was Nomena Struß. There were 12 performances, with a public rehearsal on June 11, 2014.

=== Israel ===
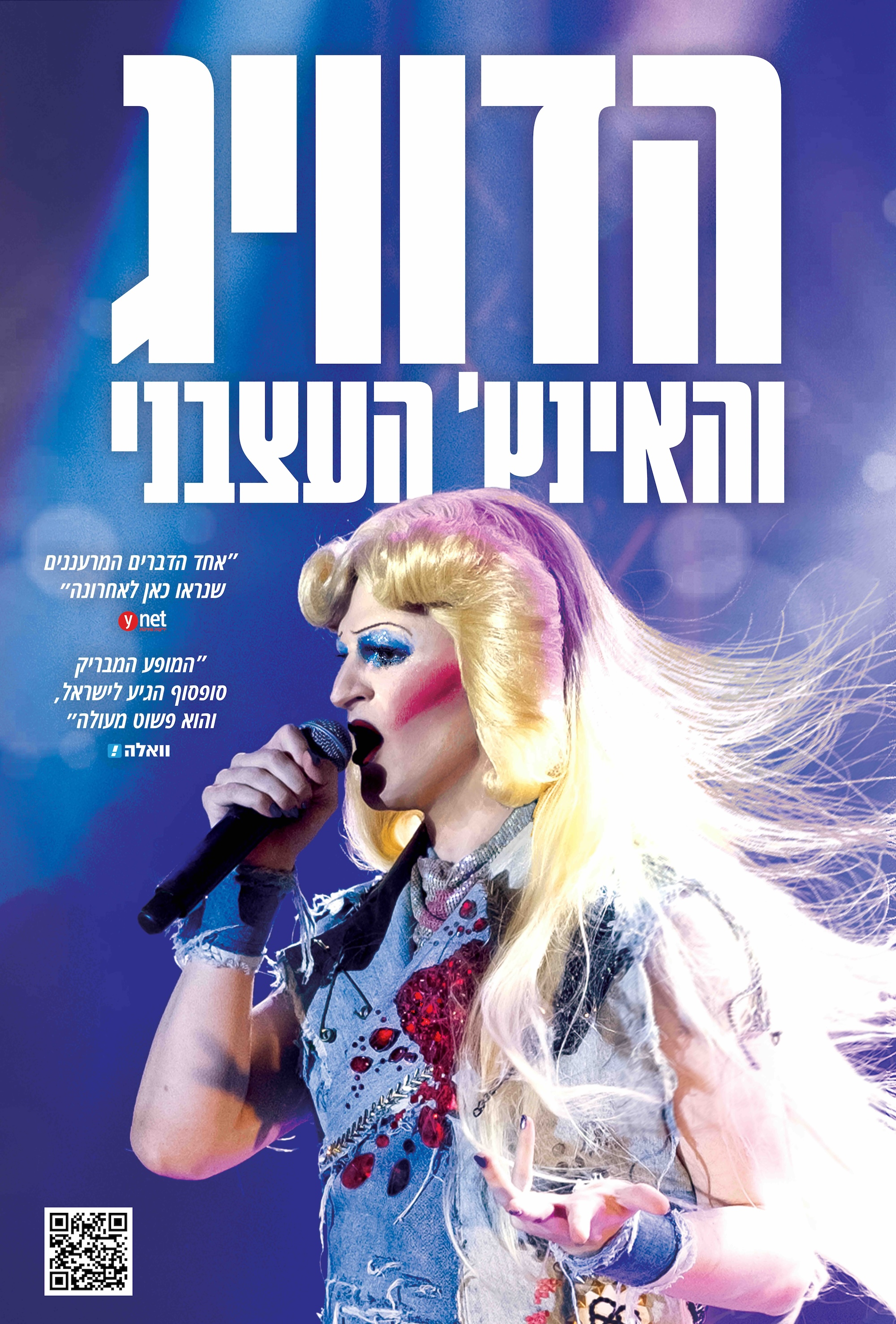
Israeli production poster art starring Roi Dolev

In May 2020, Hedwig and the Angry Inch was planned to make its Israeli premiere at the Cinema City Theatre, in Hebrew and with Roi Dolev as Hedwig, and featuring wigs by original Broadway wig designer Mike Potter. However, the COVID-19 pandemic forced the production to postpone its opening. Shortly after, the production released a single recorded in quarantine, which was praised by author Stephen Trask as "one of the best Wicked Little Town versions ever." On August 9, 2020, the production announced its intentions to present pre-premiere performances for small, socially distanced audiences, beginning October 2020. However, in January 2021, Dolev revealed the production is still in limbo due to Israel entering a second and third quarantines, not allowing public performances to occur. In March 2021, the production began pre-premiere performances, thus marking it the first musical production in Israel to resume performing following the COVID-19 pandemic. The production then went on tour in Israel in the summer of 2021, followed by an official opening night on June 8, 2022, at the Cinema City Theater, and moved to Beit Hahayal in 2023. The production closed on April 10, 2023.

The production was praised by Ynet as "one of the most refreshing things seen [in Israel] lately." Walla! added "the brilliant show finally made it to Israel, and it's just excellent."

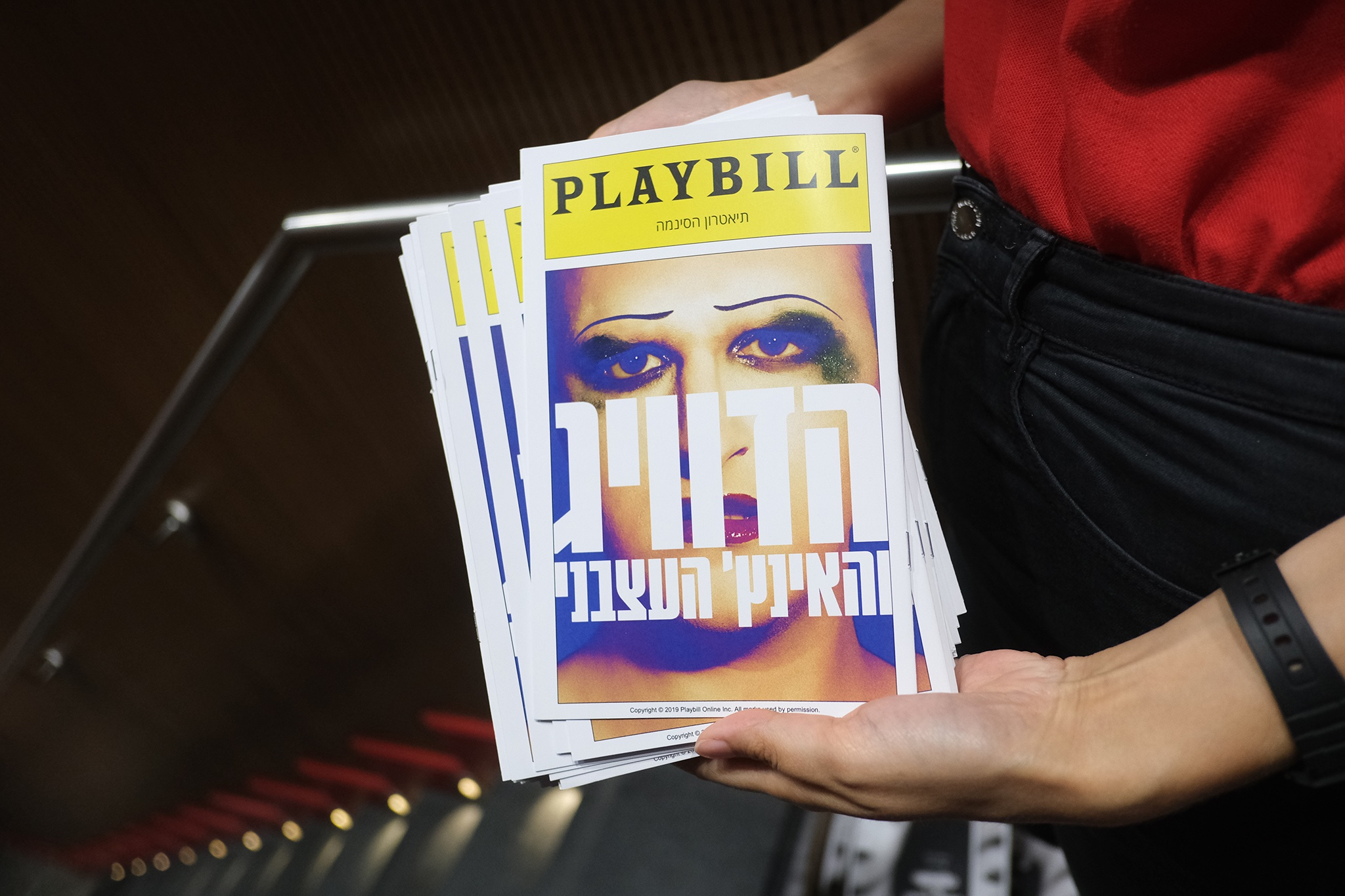
Playbills from the Israeli production

=== Italy ===
Italian Premiere of Hedwig and the Angry Inch by British Atrocity Tour in 2004:

- November 3–14, 2004 at Teatro Ariberto, Milan

with original Atrocity Tour-Cast, produced by Alessio Rombolotti in association with Helen Merill NYC, Simone Stucchi – Sound Engineer

=== Japan ===
In 2005, the show was produced at the Parco Theater in Japan with a translation by Aoi Yoji. The production starred Hiroshi Mikami and Emi Eleonola.

Two years later, the show reopened at Shinjuku Face in Tokyo with a translation by Kitamaru Yuji. The production starred Koji Yamamoto as Hedwig. In 2008, he reprised the role of Hedwig, again at the Shinjuku Face in Tokyo.

The next year, the production was performed at the Wel City in Osaka, and at Tokyo's Zepp Tokyo.

After three years, in 2012, the show reopened at Zepp DiverCity Tokyo, with Mirai Moriyama in the lead, and the lyrics translated by Shikao Suga.

A new production of the musical started August 31, 2019, at Tokyo Ex Theater Roppongi, with Neko Oikawa's lyrics, Kenji Urai as the main character, and Avu Barazono as Yitzhak; and with DURAN (Gt), YUTARO (Ba), Kusunose Takuya (Dr), Hideyuki Ohashi (Gt), Akane Otsuka (Key) as members of the band THE ANGRY INCH.

=== Mexico ===
In April 2011, the show was staged in San Miguel de Allende and was presented in both English and Spanish simultaneously. It was also staged as a special event at the Guanajuato Film Festival. This production won the Best of San Miguel Theatre Award for 2011.

In June 2017, the play was presented once again in Zacapu, Michoacán de Ocampo, under the initiative of promoting LGBTQ+ culture and rights, and this time it was entirely in Spanish. The function was carried out by an independent theater group, in collaboration with the rock band: Karma, and also coincided with the Festival: Tianguis Multicultural del Bajío 2017, thus achieving a full house in a one-time, non-profit function.

=== The Netherlands ===
In June 2014, Sven Ratzke (as Hedwig) brought the Berlin Production of Hedwig and the Angry Inch for a three-week run to Amsterdam at De Kleine Komedie, Utrecht at Stadsschouwburg Utrecht and Eindhoven at Parktheater Eindhoven, directed by Guntbert Warns.

- June 1, 2014 – June 7, 2014 – Stadsschouwburg, Utrecht
- June 11, 2014 – June 20, 2014 – De Kleine Komedie, Amsterdam
- October 4, 2022 – October 16, 2022 – nine shows in several theaters in The Netherlands, among them Delamar Theater Amsterdam

=== New Zealand ===
In May 2019, Hedwig and the Angry Inch makes its New Zealand premiere at Christchurch's The Court Theatre with Adam Rennie taking the lead role.

=== South Korea ===
Premiering in 2005, "Hedwig" has been performed about 2,300 times, making it the country's longest-running steady-selling musical. Seomoon Tak, South Korea's famous rock singer, played Yitzhak with Cho Seung-woo as Hedwig. In the 2021 production, Hedwig is portrayed by Ren, Cho Seung-woo, Oh Man-seok, Lee Kyu-hyung and Ko Eun-sung. In 2017, it was produced in English, starring Korean-American musical actor Michael K.Lee.

=== Thailand ===
The show was put on by the Bangkok University Theatre Company in July, 2011. It was then put on again in Mongkol RCA Studio in June, 2014. In both productions, Hedwig was played by Chanudol Suksatit.

=== Turkey ===
The Turkish premiere was in 2016 in Istanbul featuring Yilmaz Sutcu as Hedwig and Ayse Gunyuz as Yitzhak, with direction by Baris Arman at Kazan Dairesi.

=== United States ===
In 1999, Broadway In Boston presented the first production of Hedwig outside of New York City, at The 57 Theatre at 200 Stuart Street, Boston. Directed by Peter Askin and starring Kevin Cahoon as Hedwig and Cory Waletzko as Yitzhak, the show's official opening date was September 28, 1999. The show was performed 8 times a week until its closing in early November 1999.

The Signature Theatre in the Washington, D.C., area produced the show in 2002. It was also produced again in 2025.

In 2002 and 2003, Zany Hijinx produced the show in Boston, Massachusetts, with Gene Dante as Hedwig and Lisa Boucher as Yitzhak.

Fitzgerald's in Houston hosted a production in 2004, starring David Gill as Hedwig, and Lynda Self as Yitzhak. The show was directed by Jef Rouner, and featured musical contributions from Asmodeus X

In the summer of 2010, Hedwig and the Angry Inch played in San Juan, Puerto Rico, with Gil René playing the part of Hedwig and the band Simples Mortales doing all the live music. This version of Hedwig was completely translated into Spanish. It was revived recently in San Juan, Puerto Rico June 2026. With a new cast led by Yan Carlos Diaz playing the title role of Hedwig and Alejandra Reyes as Yitzhak. It opened to rave reviews, marking the Yan Carlos Diaz’ performance as a master class. The show closed June 28 as part of the true colors festival.

In 2011, Gene Dante and Lisa van Oosterum reprise their roles as Hedwig and Yitzhak in Zany Hijinx's New England tour of Hedwig and the Angry Inch.

A San Francisco production at Boxcar Theatre in summer 2012 featured twelve actors, male and female and of multiple ethnicities, portraying Hedwig in each show. A revival of the production, beginning in December 2012 and continuing through August 2013, featured eight actors nightly in the lead role.

In June 2013, JJ Parkey and Ruthie Stephens played Hedwig and Yitzhak at the Short North Stage Production in Columbus, Ohio.

After a successful 2013 run and a New Year's Eve performance, Roxy Theatricals presented the production from January 17 to February 1, 2014, at The Legacy Theatre in Springfield, IL.

The show was produced by TheatreLAB and Spin, Spit & Swear in Richmond, Virginia, in October 2014. Matt Shofner starred as Hedwig and Bianca Bryan played Yitzhak.

In Norfolk, Virginia, June 2024, Rouge Theater put on a production of Hedwig and the Angry Inch, starring Steve Pacek as Hedwig and Leila Stephanie as Yitzhak.

A production of Hedwig and the Angry Inch was staged at The Arch in Denver from August 1 to August 24, 2024. This production starred Clark Destin Jones as Hedwig; the role of Yitzhak was played by Anne Terze-Schwartz and Emma Rebecca Maxfield during different segments of the run.

The Peregrine Theatre Ensemble of Provincetown, Massachusetts, staged a production of Hedwig and the Angry Inch from July 5 to August 31, 2024, starring Alec Diem as Hedwig and Ash Moran as Yitzhak.

==== Broadway ====
Neil Patrick Harris starred in the first Broadway production at the Belasco Theatre, which began previews on March 29, 2014, and officially opened on April 22, 2014. Harris stayed in the production through August 17, 2014. The director was Michael Mayer with musical staging by Spencer Liff. Lena Hall played Yitzhak until April 2015. This production won several Tony awards, including Best Revival of a Musical, Best Lead Actor in a Musical (Harris) and Best Featured Actress in a musical (Hall). It was also nominated for Best Costume Design for a Musical (Arianne Phillips), who also did the costumes for the original 2001 film.

After Harris departed the production, Andrew Rannells took over the role of Hedwig on August 20, 2014, followed by Michael C. Hall, who played Hedwig from October 16, 2014, through January 18, 2015. The production then featured co-creator John Cameron Mitchell, who returned to the role from January 21 to April 26, 2015. Darren Criss took over the role of Hedwig on April 29 and played until July 19, 2015. Taye Diggs assumed the role on July 22, 2015, and performed through the production's end on September 13, 2015.

After Lena Hall left the production on April 4, 2015, Rebecca Naomi Jones took over as Yitzhak on April 14, 2015, following a week-long stint with Shannon Conley in the role.

The Broadway production closed on September 13, 2015, after 22 previews and 507 regular performances.

==== Hurt Locker: The Musical ====
This version of the musical updates the story to modern day and has Hedwig performing on the abandoned set of the fictional Hurt Locker: The Musical, which closed the prior evening midway through its first performance. Hedwig explains that because it closed so quickly, she was able to convince one of the producers to allow her to use what would have been an otherwise empty and unused stage. Faux Playbills for the musical are littered throughout the theater and discuss various elements of the musical, which Hedwig occasionally mentions offhand throughout the musical. Director Michael Mayer stated that they came up with the idea for Hurt Locker: The Musical as a way to explain Hedwig's presence in a Broadway theater. It was also used as a way to update the script to modern day as well as explain how Hedwig would be able to use such stage settings. Various newspapers have commented favorably on the faux Playbills, both as an element of the musical and as a piece separate from the musical itself.

==== First U.S. Tour ====
A national tour of the 2014 Broadway production began at San Francisco's Golden Gate Theatre on October 4, 2016, starring Darren Criss as Hedwig and Lena Hall as Yitzhak. Hall portrayed the title role of Hedwig once a week for eight performances, making her the first actor to play both Hedwig and Yitzhak in the same tour. While Hall portrayed Hedwig, Shannon Conley appeared as Yitzhak. Hall and Criss ended their run on November 27, 2016.

From November 29, 2016, to July 2, 2017, Euan Morton and Hannah Corneau portrayed Hedwig and Yitzhak, respectively, with Mason Alexander Park continuing on as the Hedwig standby/alternate and Shannon Conley as the Yitzhak standby.

==== 20th Anniversary Origin of Love Tour ====
In 2019, John Cameron Mitchell created and starred in The Origin of Love Tour: The Songs and Stories of Hedwig, a stripped-down performance focusing on the music and first-person stories about the creation of the original off-Broadway production. Mitchell embarked on the tour to raise money for medical costs related to their mother, who suffers from late-stage Alzheimer's. In addition to songs from Hedwig, the show also includes numbers from Mitchell's musical podcast Anthem: Homunculus, their film How to Talk to Girls at Parties, and covers from artists such as David Bowie.

== Adaptation ==
In 2001, John Cameron Mitchell adapted, directed and starred in a film adaptation of the musical, also named Hedwig and the Angry Inch.

== In popular culture ==
- In season 1, episode 5 of the 2019 television series Sex Education, two main characters plan to attend a performance of Hedwig and the Angry Inch while wearing costumes from the musical, as part of a yearly tradition.
- In 2020, the television series Riverdale based their musical episode from the fourth season titled "Chapter Seventy-Four: Wicked Little Town" on Hedwig and the Angry Inch.
- During a musical-inspired runway on episode 5 of series 4 of RuPaul's Drag Race UK, contestant Cheddar Gorgeous presented a runway look inspired by Hedwig and the Angry Inch.
- Type O Negative's 2003 album Life Is Killing Me includes a cover of "Angry Inch".

== Themes and analysis ==
The musical explores queer identity and challenges the notion of rock culture as being separate from live theatre. It adds to the increasing number of mainstream films and media that questions dichotomous views on sex and gender. Hedwig and the Angry Inch also provides a space for openly queer performers in this alternative theatre movement and punk subculture that is often labelled as queercore. Instead of a conventional transgender narrative that looks at an individual's account of gender dysphoria, Hedwig and the Angry Inch focuses on the main character's journey of finding love "by looking within." Academics have also recognised the link between Hedwig's search for her 'other half' and Plato's 'Origin of Love', one of Hedwig's numbers. In league with the Western emphasis on individualism, Hedwig and the Angry Inch questions what it means to be divided in an individualist society. As Mitchell, director of the film adaptation, acknowledges, through recurring motifs of "the divided self, the divided city of Berlin…divided gender…" the theme of dualism pervades the entire musical.

== Reception ==
The musical was praised by David Fricke of Rolling Stone as "the first rock musical that truly rocks". The show also attracted many fans in the music world. The show's authenticity, and its use of characters outside the usual hetero-normative constraints of theatre, was also remarked upon.

== Awards and honors ==
The original production won a Village Voice Obie Award and the Outer Critics Circle Award for Best Off-Broadway Musical.

The 2014 Broadway production received eight 2014 Tony Award nominations: Best Revival of a Musical, Best Performance by an Actor in a Leading Role in a Musical (Neil Patrick Harris), Best Performance by an Actress in a Featured Role in a Musical (Lena Hall), Best Scenic Design of a Musical (Julian Crouch), Best Costume Design of a Musical (Arianne Phillips), Best Lighting Design of a Musical (Kevin Adams), Best Sound Design of a Musical (Tim O'Heir) and Best Direction of a Musical. The production won four Tony Awards (tied with A Gentleman's Guide to Love and Murder for most awards in 2014): Best Revival of a Musical, Best Lighting Design of a Musical, Best Featured Actress in a Musical for Lena Hall, and Best Actor in a Musical for Neil Patrick Harris.

=== Original 1998 off-Broadway production ===
Year	Award ceremony	Category	Nominee	Result
1998	Outer Critics Circle Awards	Outstanding Off-Broadway Musical		Won
1998	Outer Critics Circle Awards	Outstanding Actor in a Musical	John Cameron Mitchell	Nominated
1998	Obie Award	John Cameron Mitchell		Won
1998	Obie Award	Stephen Trask		Won

=== Original 2014 Broadway production ===
Year	Award ceremony	Category	Nominee	Result
2014	Tony Award	Best Revival of a Musical		Won
2014	Tony Award	Best Leading Actor in a Musical	Neil Patrick Harris	Won
2014	Tony Award	Best Featured Actress in a Musical	Lena Hall	Won
2014	Tony Award	Best Lighting Design of a Musical	Kevin Adams	Won
2014	Tony Award	Best Costume Design of a Musical	Arianne Phillips	Nominated
2014	Tony Award	Best Direction of a Musical	Michael Mayer	Nominated
2014	Tony Award	Best Scenic Design of a Musical	Julian Crouch	Nominated
2014	Tony Award	Best Sound Design of a Musical	Timothy O'Heir	Nominated
2014	Drama Desk Awards	Outstanding Revival of a Musical		Won
2014	Drama Desk Awards	Outstanding Actor in a Musical	Neil Patrick Harris	Won
2014	Drama League Awards	Outstanding Revival of a Broadway or Off-Broadway Show		Won
2014	Drama League Awards	Distinguished Performance	Neil Patrick Harris	Won
2014	Drama League Awards	Distinguished Performance	Lena Hall	Nominated
2014	Outer Critics Circle Awards	Outstanding Revival of a Musical		Won
2014	Outer Critics Circle Awards	Outstanding Lighting Design (Play or Musical)	Kevin Adams	Won
2014	Outer Critics Circle Awards	Outstanding Actor in a Musical	Neil Patrick Harris	Nominated

=== 2016 U.S. Tour ===
Year	Award	Category	Nominee	Result
2017	Los Angeles Drama Critics Circle Award	Featured Performance	Lena Hall	Nominated
2017	Los Angeles Drama Critics Circle Award	Lead Performance	Darren Criss	Nominated
2018	IRNE Award (Independent Reviewers of New England)	Best Visiting Actor	Euan Morton	Nominated

== Fandom ==
Fans of the play and film refer to themselves as "Hedheads". In Korea and Japan, a number of teen idols and respected actors have played the role and inspired a large number of young, female Hedheads.

== Recordings ==
- 1998 Original off-Broadway Cast
- 2000 Movie Soundtrack
- 2002 "Wig" Cleveland Public Theatre Cast
- 2003 Wig in a Box (tribute album)
- 2004 UK Atrocity Tour cast
- 2005 Original Korean Cast
- 2005 Peruvian Cast (Hedwig Y la Pulgada Furiosa)
- 2006 Korean Cast
- 2006 Original Australian Cast
- 2014 Original Broadway Cast
- 2022 Original Israeli Cast

== Song covers ==
In 2003, Chris Slusarenko's Off Records released Wig in a Box, a charity tribute album which also included new material adding to the mythology of Hedwig. Performers included Frank Black and The Breeders. Slusarenko said that he fielded questions from Kim Deal of The Breeders about Black, her former bandmate in The Pixies, with whom she'd had limited conversation since the band's breakup in 1993. They made contact soon after, and Pixies reunited the following spring. Other bands who participated in Wig in a Box were Yo La Tengo featuring Yoko Ono, Sleater-Kinney featuring Fred Schneider (of The B-52's), Jonathan Richman, Rufus Wainwright, Polyphonic Spree, Spoon, Imperial Teen, Bob Mould, Cyndi Lauper with The Minus Five (featuring Peter Buck of R.E.M.), The Bens (Ben Folds, Ben Lee and Ben Kweller), They Might Be Giants, and Robyn Hitchcock. Trask and Mitchell completed an unfinished Tommy Gnosis song (left over from the musical's development days) called "Milford Lake" (sung by Mitchell) and included it. The CD also features comedian Stephen Colbert reciting the spoken introduction to Tear Me Down. The profits of this album benefitted The Hetrick-Martin Institute, home of the Harvey Milk High School, a New York City public school for gay, lesbian, bisexual, transgender and questioning youth who have experienced discrimination and violence in other public schools or at home and are at risk of not completing their secondary education.

Follow My Voice: With the Music of Hedwig, a documentary about the making of the Wig in a Box benefit CD, profiled students from the Harvey Milk School. It was directed by Katherine Linton and produced by the Sundance Channel and is now available on DVD.

The gothic metal band Type O Negative covered "Angry Inch" on their 2003 album Life Is Killing Me.

Meat Loaf covered "Tear Me Down" that same year on his album Couldn't Have Said It Better, modifying some of the lyrics (notably the spoken section about the Berlin Wall) so that the song is instead about Texas and Meat Loaf's own life.

Future Kings of Spain covered "Angry Inch" for the B-side of their 2003 single, "Hanging Around".

Ben Jelen covered Hedwig's version of "Wicked Little Town" on his 2004 album Give It All Away.

One of the bonus tracks of Damn Skippy (2005) by Lemon Demon, "Pirate In A Box", is a parody of Wig In a Box.

The Brazilian glam band Star 61 covered "Angry Inch" with lyrics in Portuguese (Polegada Irada) for their first 2005 demo album.

Constantine Maroulis covered "Midnight Radio" on his debut solo album, Constantine, in 2007.

Dar Williams, who is a college friend of composer Stephen Trask, covered "Midnight Radio" on her 2008 album Promised Land.

Underthings covered "Midnight Radio" on their 2012 album Beautiful Grotesque.
