= Blair Late =

- Born: Blair Late; April 18, 1982 (age 44); Odessa, Texas, United States
- Occupations: Singer-songwriter, actor, TV presenter
- Website: blairlate.com

Blair Madison Late (born in Odessa, Texas on April 18, 1982) is an American solo pop singer, songwriter, actor, and television presenter (on such shows as The Opinionator and Late in the Morning with Blair Late). He is also a principal cast member on season 1 of Bravo' reality television series, Newlyweds: The First Year (2013).

== Career ==
His early start was singing on the "Tommy Tune Tonight Show". He studied at the Stagedoor Manor and took part in various theatrical productions ("The Sound of Music", "42nd Street", and "Aladdin"), winning three separate awards: Grand Champion Award, Best Commercial Award, and Best Talent Award. After graduating from high school in 2000, he moved from Texas to California and studied drama at the University of California, Los Angeles (UCLA).

He next moved to New York City, and in 2002, he auditioned for casting for the boy band B3. Out of over 800 candidates, he was chosen to fill the position left vacant when Rod Michael Koch left the band. This made Late the third new member alongside B3's original members: Timothy Andrew Cruz and John Steven Sutherland.

B3 was signed to BMG Germany and disbanded in December 2004. Afterward, Late built a solo singing career in addition to presenting television celebrity and lifestyle programs under the title "The Opinionator". He also blogs at "Blair Late: Confessions from a Retired Pop Star".

As of 2010, Late is a regular contributor to Australia's The Morning Show and an occasional contributor to Sunrise as an entertainment reporter out of Los Angeles. Additionally, he and his then-partner, Jeff Pedersen were featured as principal cast members on the Bravo television docu-series, Newlyweds: The First Year, which premiered in May 2013.

Late and Pedersen split sometime later after the show.

== Discography ==
=== Albums ===
- With B3
  - N.Y.B3 (March 2003)
  - N.Y.B3 Special Edition (November 2003)
  - Living for the Weekend (September 2004)

=== Singles ===
- With B3:
  - "You're My Angel" (2003)
  - "We Got the Power" (2003)
  - "All the Girls" (2003)
  - "Move Your Body" (2004)
  - "Can't Fight the Feeling" (2004)
