= Ex-Sensitive =

Studio album by Ben Jelen
- Released: July 17, 2007
- Genre: Pop
- Label: Custard
- Producer: Linda Perry

Ben Jelen chronology
Rejected (EP) (2005)	Ex-Sensitive (2007)

Professional ratings
Review scores
Source	Rating
Allmusic	link

Ex-Sensitive is the second album by Scottish/American singer Ben Jelen and is his first release on Linda Perry's Custard Records. The first single, "Where Do We Go", failed to chart in the US.

== Track listing ==
1. "Pulse"
2. "Where Do We Go"
3. "Ex-Sensitive"
4. "Counting Down"
5. "Just a Little"
6. "Not My Plan"
7. "Papa, Here I Go"
8. "Vulnerable"
9. "Mr. Philosopher"
10. "Short of the World"
11. "Wreckage"
12. "The Other Side"
13. "What Have We Done"

== Production ==
- Produced and engineered by Linda Perry at Kung Fu Gardens, North Hollywood, California
- Right-hand man and Pro Tools engineer: Andrew Chavez
- Assisted by Kristofer Kaufman
- All tracks mixed by Ian Lehrfeld and Damon Fox except "Counting Down" and "Wreckage" mixed by Bill Botrell
- Mixes assisted by Andrew Chavez & Kristofer Kaufman
- All strings arranged by Eric Gorfain and performed by The Section Quartet
