= Rod Michael =

American pop singer (born 1981)

- Born: Rod Michael; February 17, 1986 (age 40); Allentown, Pennsylvania, U.S.
- Genres: Pop
- Occupation: Singer
- Years active: 2001–present
- Label: BMG Deutschland GmbH
- Formerly of: B3
- Website: www.rodmichael.de

Rod Michael (born 17 February 1981) is an American pop singer. He signed with BMG Deutschland GmbH (German arm of BMG) in 2001.

== In B3 ==
Michael was born in Allentown, Pennsylvania. In 2001, he became a founding member of a boy band called B3, alongside Tim Cruz and John Steven Sutherland. Rod Michael left the band at end of 2002 and was replaced by Blair Madison Late. Michael had recorded with them First, their most successful album that went gold in Germany. B3's biggest hit was "I.O.I.O.", a cover of a Bee Gees song that was #4 in Germany in 2002 and was in charts in many European and Asian countries (including Austria, Switzerland, Poland, Hungary, the Czech Republic, Thailand).

== Solo career ==
At the end of 2002, Rod Michael went solo. In June 2003, he released his first solo single "My Prerogative", a cover of the Bobby Brown song. Then, in 2004, he released his second single under BMG "someday". The same year, he released the album "The Next Episode", however, due to repercussions from leaving B3, the label refused to promote it. Because of this, he cut ties with the label and went back stateside to restart his career in the U.S. He has written more than 60 original songs.

After success in Europe, in January 2008, 1720 Entertainment distributed his first solo US release, titled "Knight in Shining Armor". This song was notably played on SiriusXM, reached markets across the US and hit the hot 100. Furthermore, the track became popular in the internet underground RnB scene, giving Michael credibility as he shed the boy band title and grew into a solo artist.

== The Voice ==
Michael took part in the blind auditions for the third season of the American singing competition The Voice. His audition was broadcast on October 1, 2012 on the last day of the blind auditions. He sang "Please Don't Go", a Mike Posner song. Michael was eliminated. The judges said Michael sounded great, but too much like the original and did not feel it was a strong song choice.

== Discography ==
=== Albums ===
- with B3:
  - First (February 2002)
- Solo Albums
  - The Next Episode (March 2004)
1. Intro feat. Caramel (01:14)
2. Someday (03:53)
3. Sadie (04:02)
4. My Prerogative feat. Caramel (04:09)
5. Dirty Love feat. Silvashado & Caramel (03:40)
6. X Boyfriend (03:21)
7. Here Comes Love Again (03:18)
8. The Way U Are (03:38)
9. Supernatural (03:10)
10. Song 4 U (03:02)
11. Nothing But Trouble (03:06)
12. Dreams (03:09)
13. Show U The Way (02:41)
14. When I Think Of U (06.55)

=== Singles ===
- Singles with B3:
  - "You Win Again" (2001)
  - "Nightfever" (2002)
  - "I.O.I.O." (2002)
- Solo singles
  - "My Prerogative" (May 2003) (CD)
  - "Someday" (2004) (CD)
  - "Knight in Shining Armor" (2008)
- Collaborations
  - Can't Believe It (T-Pain featuring Rod Michael)
