= Mike Albo =

American writer, comedian, actor and humorist

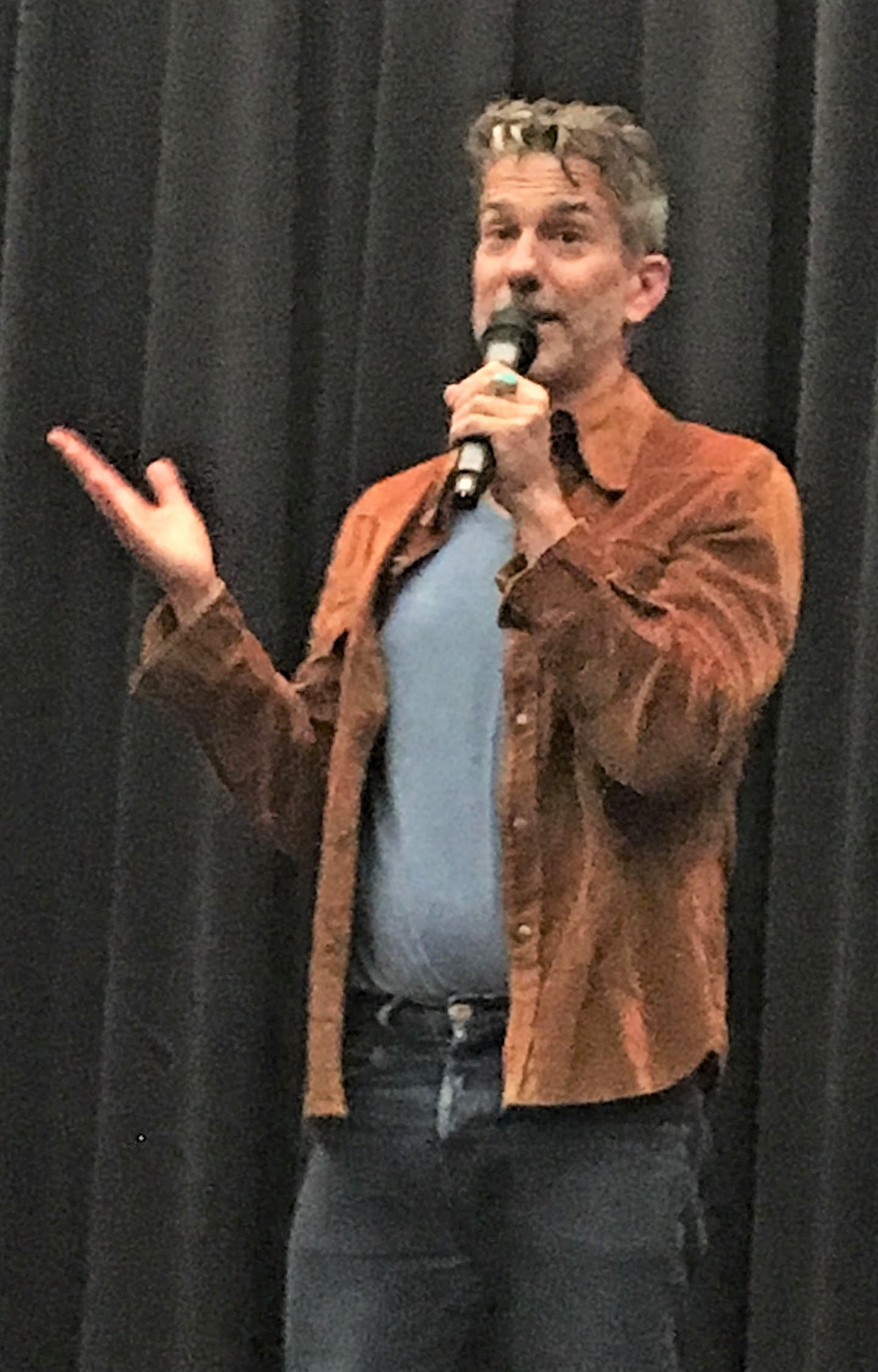
- Born: May 22, 1969 (age 57); Wright Patterson AFB, Ohio
- Education: Columbia University; University of Virginia
- Occupations: Writer, comedian, actor, humorist
- Website: www.albopublishing.com

Mike Albo (born May 22, 1969) is an American writer, comedian, actor and humorist. He is known for his writing and performances that criticize and satirize contemporary celebrity and consumer culture.

== Early life and education ==
Michael ("Mike") Albo was born on May 22, 1969, in the Wright Patterson AFB Hospital, Ohio. He attended secondary schools in Springfield, Virginia and Las Vegas, Nevada. He graduated from West Springfield High School in Fairfax County, Virginia. Albo received a B.A. from the University of Virginia in 1991, and a M.A. in Creative Writing from Columbia University School of the Arts in 1996. Albo has lived and worked in New York City since 1993.

== Career ==
=== Writing and journalism ===
Albo's first novel Hornito, was published in 2000. Hornito was reviewed by Catherine Texier in The New York Times on the December 31, 2000.

His second novel, written with Virginia Heffernan, was The Underminer: The Best Friend Who Casually Destroys Your Life, published in 2005.

His novella, "The Junket", was released as an Amazon Kindle single in September 2011 and remained as one of the top sellers for over 100 days.

In 2013 Albo wrote The Outlook Lodge Travelogue & Field Guide.

In 2014, in collaboration with the writer and actress Amanda Duarte, Albo wrote the satirical "Hurt Locker Playbill", which appears on the floor of the Belasco Theater as a part of the Hedwig and the Angry Inch Broadway show.

Albo's fiction and essays have appeared in many anthologies, including The Worst Noel, Girls Who Love Boys Who Love Boys, The Revolution Will Be Accessorized, The Time of My Life: Writers on the Heartbreak, Hormones and Debauchery of the Prom, Sex Drugs and Gefilte Fish The Heeb Storytelling Collection, Rejected: Tales of the Failed, Dumped and Canceled, Disquiet, Please! More Humor Writing from The New Yorker, Queer 13: Lesbian and Gay Writers Recall Seventh Grade and The Show I'll Never Forget. Selections of his "Junk Mail" poetry have appeared in Tin House.

As a freelance writer, Albo has contributed to magazines, newspapers and websites including The New York Times, The New Yorker, New York magazine, GQ, Elle Décor, Country Living, The Daily Beast, The Village Voice, Details, and many others. He was a Senior Editor and Fashion Writer for Cargo Magazine from 2004-2006. From 2007 to 2009 he was The Critical Shopper columnist for The New York Times and wrote more than sixty-five articles for the Times' Style section. He also had columns in BlackBook and Surface magazines. He wrote "Torascopes" for Heeb Magazine from 2005 to 2007. His love advice column in Out Magazine, "What's Your Problem?" appeared from 1998 to 2000. He also wrote horoscopes for Word.com, under the title "Horoscopes by Randy Lavender", from 1998 to 2000.

=== Performance ===
As a monologist and comedian, Albo has completed more than five solo shows including: Mike Albo, Spray, Please Everything Burst, I Can Only Come So Far, and My Price Point. Ada Calhoun, in her New York Times Theater Review of Albo's I Can Only Come So Far, notes that the show, "reinforced his status as the ultimate satirist of the downtown New York social landscape". My Price Point won the award for Best Solo Performance by Independent Reviewers of New England in 2006. Selections of his performance work appear in Extreme Exposure: An Anthology Of Solo Performance Texts From The Twentieth Century. Albo also performs as a part of the comedy trio UNITARD, and as a character known as The Underminer on stage and online videos.

In 2012 Albo served as emcee for Yaddo's annual benefit.

In 2013 Albo served as host and emcee for La MaMa's annual benefit

In 2014 Albo served as host and emcee for the VavaVoom VisualAids fundraiser.

Also in 2014 he was the host and interviewer for the 2014 PEN World Voices Literary Festival's late night Obsession Series.

Albo is a founding member of the downtown New York City dance troupe, the Dazzle Dancers. The troupe was founded in 1996 as a street performance group with a fluid membership.

=== Theater, film and television ===
Albo has written three plays. His first, Sexotheque, was produced in Austin, Texas and New York City in 2000. His second play, Three Women in Indecision, was produced at the Kraine Theater in New York City in March 2004.

His most recent play, written in 2013, was a theatrical adaption of his book, The Junket. In 2014 Albo performed The Junket Off Broadway at the Lynn Redgrave Theater. The New Yorker said of it, "Like many good comic monologuists, Albo makes serious points that land like clouds in our consciousness as we giggle along, hoping that life doesn't trip him up too much - because what would we do without Albo's self-proclaimed compulsion to express himself?" The New York Times stated, "Mr. Albo, a skillful performer and comedian as well as a keen journo-observer, has a way with words and line delivery. His likable persona balances the snark and the silliness, and it's hard not to be sympathetic to his dilemma as 'the Silkwood of Swag.'"

Albo was the producer, writer, and actor in the 2010 Plum TV series titled What's in Store with Mike Albo. He was the writer and lead actor in the 2005 film short, "The Underminer", produced and directed by Todd Downing. He also had the lead role in the 2001 film short "Jeffrey's Hollywood Screen Trick", produced and directed by Downing. In addition, Albo had acting roles in "Rosa Negra", a series of short films produced and directed by Viva Ruiz, and "Boys Life 4" directed by Brian Sloan.
