= The Romantic Lead =

Studio album by Gene Dante and The Future Starlets
- Released: February 3, 2009
- Recorded: 2008 at Q Division Studios in Somerville, MA
- Genres: Glam, Rock, Pop
- Length: 42:51
- Label: Omnirox Entertainment
- Producer: Peter Lubin

Gene Dante and The Future Starlets chronology
Gene Dante and The Future Starlets (2006)	The Romantic Lead (2009)	The Love Letter Is Dead (Single) (2010)

Singles from The Romantic Lead
- 1. "C Star"; 2. "A Madness to His Method"; 3. "OK Sunshine"

The Romantic Lead is the second studio album released by the Boston-based glam-rock band Gene Dante and The Future Starlets. Produced by veteran A&R executive Peter Lubin (The Pixies), the album was released in early 2009 by Omnirox Entertainment as a follow-up to their 2006 self-titled debut EP. It received favorable reviews from around the country as well as some international acclaim.

== Track listing ==
1. A Madness to His Method
2. Purity of Intent
3. The Starlet Hits the Wall
4. Photosynthetic
5. Brian, My Darling
6. C Star
7. OK Sunshine
8. The Dreamers
9. Like a Satellite
10. This Is the Closing
11. To a God Unknown

== Personnel ==
- Gene Dante - lead and harmony vocals, rhythm guitar
- Alice Lee Scott - lead guitar
- Jim Collins - bass, harmony vocals
- Tamora Gooding - drums, percussion

=== Additional musicians and instruments ===
- Kevin Bents: piano, keys, guitar, synthetic/midi instruments & ambient textures, percussion, harmony vocals
- Strings & Horns arranged by Peter Lubin & Kevin Bents
- Interstellar Stutter Guitar: Kevin Bents
- Female Harmony Vocals: Jane Aquilina (To a God Unknown) & Jean Simon
- Male Harmony Vocals: Kevin Bents, Peter Lubin, Brett Fasullo, John Pinto Jr.
- Percussion & Acoustic Guitar: Peter Lubin
- Baritone Sax: Jon "The Lip" Lupfer
- Handclaps: The C Suckers
- Giant Mellotron: Emeen Zarookian

=== Production ===
- Producer: Peter Lubin
- Engineer: Jon Lupfer
- Mixed by: Peter Lubin & Jon Lupfer
- All Word and Music by: Gene Dante, except "The Starlet Hits the Wall" (words and music by Gene Dante and Ad Frank)
- Additional Engineering: Kris Smith & Patrick DiCenso
- Recorded at: Q Division Studios in Somerville, MA
- Additional Overdubs recorded at Bashville, NYC
- Mastering: Jeff Lipton (Peerless Mastering)

=== Graphics ===
- Art Direction: Rowan Bishop (Bridge Street Design)
- Photo Credit: Andrew Olson
