= Rüdiger Bering =

Rüdiger Bering (born 1961, Hanover) is German dramaturge, academic, and theatre historian.

== Life and career ==
Rüdiger Bering was born in Hanover, Germany in 1961. He lived with his family in the South Palatinate region of Germany. He was educated at the Free University of Berlin where he began his studies in theatre and journalism in 1982. After graduating in 1988 with a Master of Arts degree, he was employed by a variety of theatres in Berlin as a dramaturge.

In 1991 Bering joined the faculty of the Berlin University of the Arts where he taught courses in theatre history and dramaturgy. In 2008 he joined the staff of Theater Oberhausen as the organization's executive dramaturge. He remained in that position until 2017 when he left to succeed Peter Carp as chief dramaturge at the Theater Freiburg. As of 2025 he remains in that position.

As an author, Bering co wrote a book on musical theatre, Musical: Das Unterhaltende Genre, which was published by Laaber-Verlag in 1997. Alone he wrote a book on musical theatre history, DuMont Schnellkurs Musical which was published by M. DuMont Schauberg in 1997. It was translated into English and published under the title Musicals: An Illustrated Historical Overview by Barron's in 1998. Performing arts scholar Alisa C. Roost in her assessment of this work in 2001 stated that at that time it was the only general reference work on musicals to include a section on political satire.

Bering is also the author of several German-language translations of plays written by American and French playwrights. His 2017 translation of Alan Jay Lerner's libretto for Kurt Weill's Love Life was approved of by the Kurt Weil Foundation and was praised for successfully "striking a tone reminiscent of the great song and operetta lyricists of the German and Viennese interwar years, such as Marcellus Schiffer and Fritz Löhner-Beda". He is also the author of the German-language translation of Hedwig and the Angry Inch.
