= Virginia Heffernan =

American journalist (born 1969)

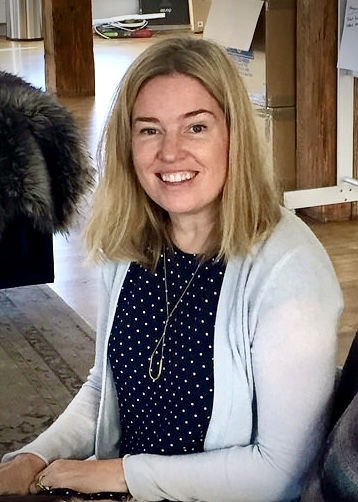
- Heffernan in 2016
- Born: Virginia Page Heffernan; August 8, 1969 (age 57); Hanover, New Hampshire, U.S.
- Education: University of Virginia (BA); Harvard University (MA, PhD)
- Occupations: Author, columnist
- Writing career
- Genres: Internet; Pop culture Media

Virginia Heffernan (born August 8, 1969) is an American journalist and cultural critic. Since 2015, she has been a political columnist at the Los Angeles Times and a cultural columnist at Wired. From 2003 to 2011, she worked as a staff writer for The New York Times, first as a television critic, then as a magazine columnist, and then as an opinion writer. She has also worked as a senior editor for Harper's Magazine, as a founding editor of Talk, and as a TV critic for Slate. Her 2016 book Magic and Loss: The Internet as Art argued that the Internet is a "massive and collective work of art", one that is a "work in progress", and that the suggested deterioration of attention spans in response to it is a myth.

== Early life and education ==
Virginia Heffernan was born in Hanover, New Hampshire. She is a 1991 graduate, summa cum laude, from the University of Virginia. She is also a dual graduate of Harvard University with a master's degree in English literature in 1993 and a Ph.D. in 2002.

== Career ==
=== Journalism ===
Heffernan began her career as a fact checker with The New Yorker magazine. She served as a senior editor at Harper's Magazine and was a founding editor of Talk magazine.

In June 2002, the Columbia Journalism Review named Heffernan one of its "Ten Young Editors to Watch." In September of the following year, Heffernan departed Slate to join The New York Times. While there, she started the blog "Screens" for the New York Times website, which eventually became "The Medium" blog (named after her column).

In February 2012, Heffernan became a national correspondent for Yahoo News, where she covered the 2012 presidential election and wrote about subjects related to media, technology, politics, and culture. In June 2013, Heffernan began a series of articles for Yahoo News entitled "Glass Menagerie," which involved her experiences using Google Glass OHMD.

Heffernan is a regular contributor to The New York Times, as well as The Wall Street Journal, Wired, Mother Jones, Politico, and many other publications.

In her journalism, Heffernan writes about culture and technology using methods of literary criticism. Her work often centers on the human side of technology and culture in general, and she advocates broader and more critical thinking regarding newer technologies.

In parallel to writing on the subject, Heffernan also participates actively in social media. She openly befriends her readers on Facebook, tweets frequently, and maintains an active Tumblr account.

In July 2013, Heffernan published an article entitled "Why I'm a creationist," saying she was "considerably less amused and moved by the character-free Big Bang story ("something exploded") than by the twisted and picturesque misadventures of Eve and Adam." Heffernan received much criticism for her column. Critics responded to her postmodern stance, several quoting Daniel Patrick Moynihan: "Everyone is entitled to his own opinion, but not to his own facts". However, writing in The Guardian, Andrew Brown dismissed Heffernan's critique of evolution, but noted that: "[s]he is certainly not a young-earth creationist ... [b]ut she wants stories where people find hope and courage in the events of the world around them, and she finds them in religion, not in science".

In 2014 Ben Yagoda in the Chronicle of Higher Education named Heffernan among his top candidates for "best living writer of English prose."

On February 5, 2021, Heffernan published an opinion piece in the Los Angeles Times entitled "What can you do about the Trumpites next door?" in which she wondered, self-critically, how to respond to kindness from rightwing neighbors. Heffernan received criticism from right-wing pundits like Tucker Carlson and Megyn Kelly.

=== Podcasts ===
From October 2018, Heffernan was the host of Slate's Trumpcast podcast. In it, she evaluated and critiqued the presidency of Donald Trump, interviewing guests like Yascha Mounk, Fareed Zakaria, David Corn and more. On January 30, 2021, the final episode was released.

In April 2021, Heffernan began a new podcast, After Trump with Lawfare following on from her work on Trumpcast.

=== Books and TV ===
In 2005, Heffernan published The Underminer, a comic novel she co-wrote with Mike Albo. She also scripted Matthew's Murder, an Emmy award-nominated, MTV documentary on the murder of Matthew Shepard.

=== Magic and Loss ===
Heffernan has been online since the age of ten, when she used a Zenith computer terminal and dial-up modem at home to play a MUD at Dartmouth College. Simon & Schuster published her book about digital culture, Magic and Loss: The Internet As Art, in June 2016. In this, Heffernan argued that the Internet is "the great masterpiece of civilization, a massive and collective work of art". The book was well received, earning a starred Kirkus review and appearing on the summer reading lists of Gwyneth Paltrow and Lenny Letter. Paltrow called Heffernan, "One of the writers I most admire." The New York Review of Books called Heffernan's book "an ecstatic narrative of submission," while The Wall Street Journal described the book as "(a)n illuminating guide to the internet." In The New Yorker, Louis Menand wrote that "Heffernan is smart, her writing has flair, she can refer intelligently to Barthes, Derrida, and Benjamin—also to Aquinas, Dante, and Proust—and she knows a lot about the Internet and its history. She is good company."

== Bibliography ==
=== Books ===
- Heffernan, Virginia (1999). Bonney, Jo (ed.). Extreme Exposure: An Anthology of Solo Performance Texts from the Twentieth Century. Theatre Communications Group. ISBN 1559361557.
- Heffernan, Virginia (2002). Casey, Nell (ed.). Unholy Ghost: Writers on Depression. William Morrow Paperback. ISBN 0060007826.
- Heffernan, Virginia (2004). Bauer, Douglas (ed.). Prime Times: Writers on their Favorite TV Shows. Harper Perennial. ISBN 1400081149.
- Albo, Mike; Heffernan, Virginia (2005). The Underminer: The Best Friend Who Casually Destroys Your Life. Bloomsbury USA. ISBN 1582344841.
- Heffernan, Virginia (2011). Brockman, John (ed.). Is the Internet Changing the Way You Think?: The Net's Impact on Our Minds and Future. Harper Perennial. ISBN 978-0062020444.
- Heffernan, Virginia (2014). Brockman, John (ed.). What Should We Be Worried About?: Real Scenarios That Keep Scientists Up at Night. Harper Perennial. ISBN 978-0062296238.
- Heffernan, Virginia (2016). Magic and Loss: The Internet as Art. ISBN 9781439191705.

=== Essays and reporting ===
- Heffernan, Virginia (November 2021). "Romancing the stones : [...] thinking about Pangaea Proxima [...]". Wired. Vol. 29, no. 11. pp. 9–10, 12.

=== Theses ===
- Heffernan, Virginia (2002). The Threat of American Life: Literary Defensiveness at the Turn of the Nineteenth Century (Ph.D.). Harvard University.
