= Tim Cruz =

American musician

Timothy Andrew Cruz, known professionally as Tim Cruz (January 2, 1976) is an American former pop singer signed with Fearless Management. He is also in music production and does some modelling as well.

== Early life ==
Timothy Andrew Cruz was born on January 2, 1979 in New York City.

== Career ==
In the late 1990s, he was a member of the boy band React with Daniel Matrium. They had a Top 10 hit on the dance charts with "Let's Go All The Way".

In 2001, Tim Cruz became a founding member of another boy band called B3 alongside Rod Michael and John Steven Sutherland. When Rod Michael left, he was replaced in 2002 by Blair Madison Late. B3 was mainly successful in Germany. Their biggest hit was "I.O.I.O.", a cover of a Bee Gees song that was #4 in Germany in 2002 and was in charts in many European and Asian countries (including Austria, Switzerland, Poland, Hungary, the Czech Republic, Thailand).

B3 disbanded in December 2004 and Tim Cruz continued with Fearless Management for a solo career.

== Personal life ==
Timothy currently owns Barber & Co in Tampa, with freestanding locations and shops inside Golds Gym.

Wife is Shannon Goldberg-Cruz, they share two children, Emm (girl) and Reis (boy)

== Discography ==
=== Albums with B3 ===
- First (2002)
- N.Y.B3 (2003)
- N.Y.B3 Special Edition (2003)
- Living for the Weekend (2004)

=== Singles with REACT ===
- "Let's Go All The Way" (1998)

=== Singles with B3 ===
- "You Win Again" (2001)
- "Nightfever" (2002)
- "I.O.I.O" (2002)
- "Tonight and Forever" (2002)
- "You're My Angel" (2003)
- "We Got the Power" (2003)
- "All the Girls" (2003)
- "Move Your Body" (2004)
- "Can't Fight the Feeling" (2004)
