= Love Life (musical) =

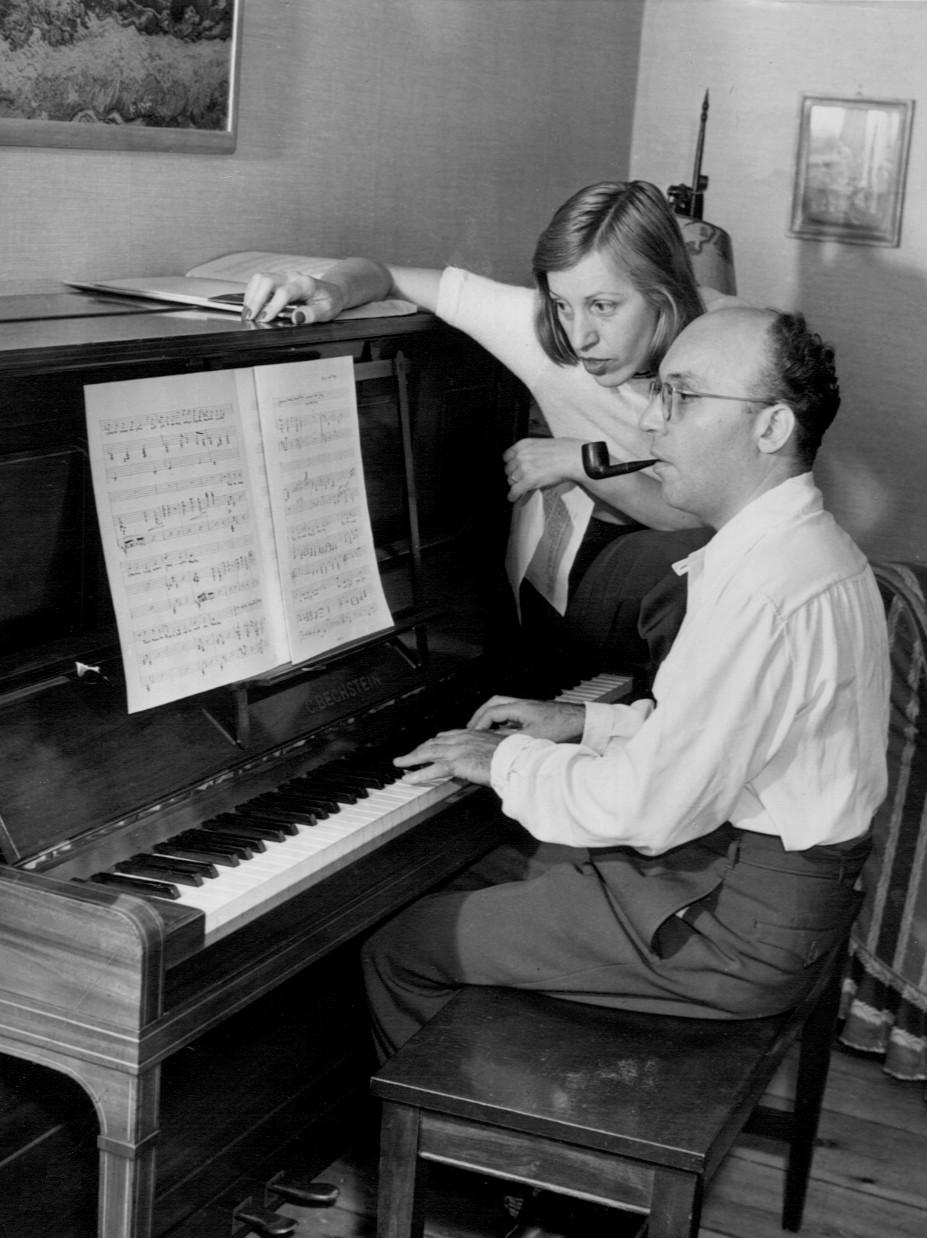
- Kurt Weill with Lotte Lenya at home in 1942
- Music: Kurt Weill
- Lyrics: Alan Jay Lerner
- Book: Alan Jay Lerner
- Productions: 1948 Broadway; 1996 Opera North Leeds , 2025 Leeds, England; 2025 Off-Broadway

Love Life is a musical written by Kurt Weill (music) and Alan Jay Lerner (book and lyrics).

The musical opened at the 46th Street Theatre on Broadway (now the Richard Rodgers) on October 7, 1948, and closed on May 14, 1949, after having played 252 performances. The original production starred Ray Middleton and Nanette Fabray, was directed by Elia Kazan, and choreographed by Michael Kidd. Fabray won the Tony Award for Best Leading Actress in a Musical for her performance.

== Synopsis ==
The show told the story of a married couple, Sam and Susan Cooper, who never age as they progress from 1791 to 1948, encountering difficulties in their marriage (and thus the very fabric of marriage) as they struggle to cope with changing social mores. One of the earliest examples of the concept musical, the action of Love Life was interspersed with vaudeville-style numbers that commented on the story, in a way very similar to Cabaret (which opened in 1966).

== Revivals ==
In 2017 Love Life was staged at Theater Freiburg using a German-language translation of Lerner's libretto by Rüdiger Bering. His translation was approved of by the Kurt Weill Foundation and was praised for successfully "striking a tone reminiscent of the great song and operetta lyricists of the German and Viennese interwar years, such as Marcellus Schiffer and Fritz Löhner-Beda".

The show was revived twice in 2025, by Opera North in Leeds, UK. Opera North had also fully staged the show's UK premiere (at Leeds Grand)in 1996. Although the 1996 version was broadcast on BBC Radio 3, the 2025 Leeds semi-staged production was the first released UK recording with a cast headed by Quirijn de Lang and Stephanie Corley, and by New York City Center in 2025 as part of their Encores! series starring Kate Baldwin and Brian Stokes Mitchell.

== Influence ==
Critic Norman Lebrecht has called the piece "foundational" for Stephen Sondheim. "There is no Company or Merrily or Pacific Overtures without it".

== Original cast and characters ==
Character	Broadway (1948)
Susan Cooper	Nanette Fabray
Sam Cooper	Ray Middleton
Elizabeth Cooper	Cheryl Archer
Johnny Cooper	Johnny Stewart

== Musical Numbers ==
=== Part One ===
The Magician

- Opening (Waltz) - The Magician, Sam, and Susan

The Cooper Family

- Who Is Samuel Cooper? - Mary Jo, George, Jonathan, Charlie, Hank, and Women
- My Name Is Samuel Cooper - Sam
- Here I'll Stay - Sam and Susan

Eight Men

- Progress - The Go-Getters

The Farewell

- I Remember It Well - Sam and Susan
- Green Up-Time - Susan, Men and Women
- Polka and Green Up-Time (Reprise) - Susan, Johnny, Men and Women
- I Remember It Well (Reprise) - Sam, Susan, Johnny and Elizabeth

Quartette

- Economics - Quartette
- Susan's Dream [Cut Song] - Quartette

The New Baby

- Prelude and Postlude to Scene - Orchestra

Three Tots and A Woman

- Mother's Getting Nervous - Three Tots
- Trapeze Specialty - Trapeze Artist
- Foxtrot (with Encore) - Three Tots

My Kind of Night

- My Kind Of Night - Sam
- Women's Club Blues - Susan and Women
- My Kind of Night (Reprise) - Sam

Love Song

- Progress (Reprise with Soft Shoe) [Cut Song] - The Go-Getters
- Love Song - Hobo

The Cruise

- I'm Your Man - Sam, Slade, Boylan, Harvey, and Leffcourt
- You Understand Me So [Cut Song] - Susan and Taylor
- Finale Part One: I'm Your Man (Reprise) - Entire Company

=== Part Two ===
Madrigal Singers

- Ho, Billy O! - Leader and Singers

Radio Night
The Locker Room Boys [Cut and Replaced with Madrigal Singers]

- The Locker Room - Locker Room Boys

Farewell Again

- I Remember It Well (Reprise) - Sam and Susan
- Is It Him or Is It Me? - Susan

The All-American Puppet Ballet Present Punch and Judy Get A Divorce

- Prologue - Punch, Judy, Lawyer, Judge, Bell Hop, Correspondent
- Courtroom - The same in addition to Two Lawyers, Flighty Pair, and Speedy Pair
- Family Trio (Green Up-Time) - Child, Father, and Mother
- Hep Cats (Economics) - Hep Cats

A Hotel Room

- This Is The Life - Sam

The Minstrel Show

- Here I'll Stay (Reprise) - Interlocutor
- We're Sellin' Sunshine - Interlocutor and Minstrels
- Introduction - Interlocutor, Sam, Susan, and Minstrels
- Madame Zuzu - Miss Horoscope and Miss Mysticism
- Takin' No Chances - Mr. Cynic
- Mr. Right (Introduction) - Miss Ideal Man
- Mr. Right - Susan
- Finale Ultimo - Sam and Susan

No official cast recording of the original production of Love Life was made; a strike at the time of the original production prevented it, as also happened with Where's Charley?, which opened four days later, on Oct. 11, 1948. The January 2025 Opera North production, produced by the BBC and issued as a CD, claims to be the first complete recording.

The song "I Remember it Well" is the original version of a lyric Lerner revised for the 1958 film Gigi.
