= Under the Elephant =

American alternative band

- Origin: New York City, New York, United States
- Genres: Pop rock, indie rock, alternative
- Years active: 2009–present
- Members: Ben Jelen; Josh McMillan; Lisa McMillan; Tina Mathieu Logie; Jimmy Stull; Stan Esposito; Steve Esposito

Under The Elephant (often abbreviated as UTE) is an American alternative band based in New York City. The band was formed in 2009 by solo artist Ben Jelen and former Deuce Project member Josh McMillan. The band's debut album, The Eleventh Hour was released on April 22, 2011. As of January 2012, the band is unsigned.

== History ==
Under The Elephant was formed in 2009 by Ben Jelen and Josh McMillan, former label mates at Maverick Records. The two were also joined by friends Lisa McMillan, Tina Mathieu Logie, Stan Esposito, Steve Esposito, and Jimmy Stull. Their first album, The Eleventh Hour was released in April 2011.

== Members ==
- Ben Jelen
- Josh McMillan
- Lisa McMillan
- Tina Mathieu Logie
- Jimmy Stull
- Stan Esposito
- Steve Esposito

== Discography ==
- The Eleventh Hour (2011)
