= Hedwig and the Angry Inch (film) =

2001 American musical film by John Cameron Mitchell

- Theatrical release poster
- Directed by: John Cameron Mitchell
- Written by: John Cameron Mitchell
- Based on: Hedwig and the Angry Inch by: Stephen Trask; John Cameron Mitchell
- Produced by: Christine Vachon; Katie Roumel; Pamela Koffler
- Starring: John Cameron Mitchell; Andrea Martin; Michael Pitt; Miriam Shor
- Cinematography: Frank G. DeMarco
- Edited by: Andrew Marcus
- Music by: Stephen Trask
- Production company: Killer Films
- Distributed by: New Line Cinema (through Fine Line Features)
- Release dates: January 2001 (Sundance); July 20, 2001 (United States)
- Running time: 92 minutes
- Country: United States
- Languages: English; German
- Budget: $6 million
- Box office: $3.6 million

Hedwig and the Angry Inch is a 2001 American musical comedy-drama film written for the screen and directed by John Cameron Mitchell. Based on Mitchell's and Stephen Trask's 1998 stage musical Hedwig and the Angry Inch, it accompanies Hedwig Robinson, a gay East German rock singer. Hedwig subsequently develops a relationship with a younger man, Tommy, becoming his mentor and musical collaborator, only to have Tommy steal her music and become a rock star. The film follows Hedwig and her backing band, the Angry Inch, as they shadow Tommy's tour, while exploring Hedwig's past and her forced sex reassignment surgery. Mitchell reprises his role as Hedwig from the original production.

Despite largely positive reviews from critics and audiences, the film's limited release only grossed $3.6 million from an estimated $6 million budget. The musical has since developed a devoted cult following.

In 2001, the film won the Best Director and Audience Awards at the Sundance Film Festival as well as Best Directorial Debut from the National Board of Review, the Gotham Awards, and the Los Angeles Film Critics Association. Mitchell received a Golden Globe nomination for Best Actor – Motion Picture Musical or Comedy and the Premiere magazine Performance of the Year Award.

== Plot ==
Hansel Schmidt is a gay, East German teenager who loves rock music and is stuck in East Berlin until he meets Sergeant Luther Robinson, an American soldier. Luther proposes marriage to Hansel, persuading him to undergo sex reassignment surgery in order to leave Communist East Germany for the West as his wife, because that was the only legal solution. Hansel's mother, Hedwig, gives her child her name and passport and finds a doctor to perform the genital surgery. The operation is botched, however, leaving Hansel—now Hedwig—with a dysfunctional one-inch mound of flesh between her legs, the titular "Angry Inch".

Hedwig goes to live in Junction City, Kansas, as Luther's wife. On their first wedding anniversary, Luther leaves Hedwig for a man. That same day, it is announced that the Berlin Wall has fallen and East Germans are flooding freely into the West, meaning as material gains go, Hedwig's sacrifices have been for nothing. Hedwig recovers from the separation by confidently accepting her identity as a woman, picking up some "odd jobs", and returning to her "first love" of music by forming a rock band composed of Korean-born Army wives.

Babysitting for "the commander of the nearby fort", Hedwig befriends Tommy Speck, a shy and misunderstood teenager questioning his Christian upbringing. For six months, she teaches him "rock history, lyrics, grooming, and vocal training", taking him from playing the occasional guitar masses to the two of them "outgrossing monster trucks in Wichita". Hedwig gives him the stage name "Tommy Gnosis" (stating that Gnosis is the Greek word for "knowledge") for his graduation. Upon discovering her "inch", Tommy leaves Hedwig and goes on to become a wildly successful rock star by stealing Hedwig's songs.

Hedwig and her band, the Angry Inch (now composed of Eastern Europeans including her husband, Yitzhak), are forced to support themselves by playing in a chain of failing seafood restaurants called Bilgewater's and other small venues. Hedwig is following Tommy's tour while pursuing a copyright lawsuit. In between songs, she reflects on her life's story through flashbacks and stories told directly to either uninterested restaurant patrons or her small, but loyal group of fans.

Throughout the film, Hedwig refers to Aristophanes' speech in Plato's Symposium. This myth, retold by Hedwig in the song "The Origin of Love", explains that human beings were once round, two-faced, four-armed, and four-legged beings. Angry gods split these early humans in two, leaving the separated people with a lifelong yearning for their other half.

Near the end of the film, Hedwig is down and out, her band and manager having abandoned her in disgust after she tears up Yitzhak's passport to prevent him from pursuing an acting role in a tour of Rent. While working as a streetwalker, she finally reunites with Tommy and they reconcile. After the two of them accidentally drive Tommy's limo into a news truck, paparazzi burst onto the scene, Hedwig becomes famous and Gnosis' popularity tanks. Reunited with her band, Hedwig performs at Times Square, culminating in a violent removal of her drag.

Entering the final chapter of the film, it seems to take place in a non-real space, perhaps Hedwig's mind. Now in male form, Hedwig discovers herself alone in front of Tommy on a huge stage. Tommy sings to Hedwig, pleading forgiveness and saying goodbye; she realizes that she created her "other half" from within herself. Hedwig then finds herself back at Times Square, but the space seems transformed, with ambient white lighting. The band members, dressed all in white, are already in their places on stage. Hedwig is now dressed in Tommy's clothes and make-up. Hedwig gives Yitzhak her blonde wig, allowing Yitzhak to take her place, and sings in solidarity with "all the misfits and losers" of the world. A brief animated sequence symbolizing the union of the separated Platonic halves leads to the final shot: Hedwig walking naked down a dark alley and into the street.

== Cast ==
- John Cameron Mitchell as Hedwig Robinson/Hansel Schmidt
  - Ben Mayer-Goodman as 6-year-old Hansel
- Andrea Martin as Phyllis Stein
- Michael Pitt as Tommy Speck/Tommy Gnosis
- Alberta Watson as Hedwig Schmidt
- Stephen Trask as Skszp
- Rob Campbell as Krzysztof
- Theodore Liscinski as Jacek
- Michael Aronov as Schlatko
- Miriam Shor as Yitzhak
- Gene Pyrz as Hansel's father
- Karen Hines as Tommy's publicist
- Maurice Dean Wint as Sergeant Luther Robinson
- Sook-Yin Lee as Kwahng-Yi
- Rosie O'Donnell as herself (uncredited)
- Dar Williams as singer on main stage (uncredited)

== Soundtrack ==
1. "Tear Me Down"
2. "Random Number Generation" (excerpt only)
3. "Tear Me Down" (Tommy Gnosis version) (excerpt only)
4. "The Origin of Love"
5. "Sugar Daddy"
6. "Angry Inch"
7. "Wig in a Box"
8. "The Origin of Love" (Tommy Gnosis version) (excerpt only)
9. "Wicked Little Town"
10. "I Will Always Love You" (excerpt only)
11. "The Long Grift" (excerpt only, full version on soundtrack)
12. "Freaks" (excerpt only, full version on soundtrack, with Girls Against Boys)
13. "In Your Arms Tonight"
14. "Hedwig's Lament"
15. "Exquisite Corpse"
16. "Wicked Little Town (Reprise)"
17. "Midnight Radio"

Songs only on the soundtrack

1. "Nailed" (on soundtrack only)

For the soundtrack, Hedwig's songs were recorded by John Cameron Mitchell (lead vocals), Stephen Trask, Miriam Shor, Bob Mould (of Hüsker Dü), Ted Liscinski, Perry L. James, Alexis Fleisig, and Eli Janney.

Tommy Gnosis' songs were recorded by Trask (lead vocals), Shor, Mould, Liscinski, James, Scott McCloud, Janney, Fleisig, and Johnny Temple.

In 2003, a CD of the film's song covers by such artists as Yoko Ono and Cyndi Lauper was released. It benefited the Hetrick-Martin Institute and was named after one of the musical's most popular songs "Wig in a Box". Goth-metal band Type O Negative recorded a cover of "Angry Inch" on their 2003 album Life Is Killing Me.

== Production ==
Mitchell had been approached during the Off-Broadway run of the musical with the offer to adapt Hedwig into a film. He developed parts of the script at the Sundance film labs, notably the trailer scene with Tommy Speck. Later, the film was entered into the Sundance Film Festival.

According to the DVD commentary, most of the lead vocals were recorded "live" as the scenes were shot, to capture the intensity of a live performance. The live recording of "Hedwig's Lament" is the version on the film soundtrack despite most of the songs being studio recorded for the album.

Mitchell had to shave constantly during the course of the film shoot, often using an electric razor between shots while still in full makeup. Also in the DVD commentary, Mitchell mentions that Pitt was somewhat uncomfortable with their prolonged kissing scene, complaining about being scratched by Mitchell's stubble. Mitchell mentioned Pitt consuming onion and garlic directly before shooting the scene.

== Release ==
=== Marketing ===
Mitchell and Trask performed twice on The Rosie O'Donnell Show (the second time with Dean DeLeo of Stone Temple Pilots). At first, the studio objected to a "drag" performance on the daytime family show, but relented at the insistence of O'Donnell. Mitchell and his band performed "The Origin of Love". A clip from this show was used in the Hedwig film, with O'Donnell's blessing.

Mitchell said that his performance on the Late Show with David Letterman as Hedwig was interesting: "During rehearsal, a disembodied voice emanating from the control booth gently told me that I couldn't rip my wig off during the song ("Tear Me Down"). I asked why, but there was only silence from on high. So when we taped, I ripped it off after the song. They edited it out. I think they wanted people to think I was a woman, and not a man in drag."

=== Critical reception ===
On review aggregator Rotten Tomatoes, the film holds an approval rating of 92% based on 117 reviews, with an average rating of 8.3/10. The website's critical consensus reads, "Hedwig and the Angry Inch may very well be the next Rocky Horror midnight movie. It not only knows how to rock, but Hedwig's story has an emotional poignancy." On the review aggregator website Metacritic, the film had an average score of 85 out of 100, based on 29 reviews from film critics, indicating "universal acclaim".

Kevin Maynard from Mr. Showbiz wrote that film "[s]tomps the summer movie competition with heart and humour." Ed Epstein from The Wall Street Journal commented "This extraordinary flight from the humdrum is not to be missed." Chris Kaltenbach from The Baltimore Sun wrote "This is Mitchell's show, and his performance lives up to his triple billing as writer, director and star."

=== Box office ===
The film earned an initial domestic theatrical total of $3,644,200 from a $6 million budget. The film opened in the U.S. in 9 theaters on July 20, 2001, and made $156,724 in its opening weekend, ranking #28 in the box office.

The film's release expanded through September, which John Cameron Mitchell later said affected the film's prospects because of the September 11 attacks. Shortly after the attacks, theaters offered free tickets to moviegoers, although many people did see the film, the free entry meant that Hedwig And The Angry Inch did not make any money upon its release.

The film has gained an international cult following and has appeared on many 'Best Films' lists.

=== Home media ===
The film was released on DVD on December 11, 2001, complete with deleted scenes, an audio commentary by Mitchell and Director of Photography Frank DeMarco, a full-length documentary "Whether You Like It Or Not: The Story of Hedwig," and the original theatrical trailer.

The deleted scenes mostly expand on the characters around Hedwig; we learn more about Yitzhak (he was once a drag queen called "Krystal Nacht", a pun on Kristallnacht), how he met Hedwig in a Croatian drag bar, and we see his preparing to audition for the role of Angel in Rent. We also learn that Hedwig's manager, Phyllis, has a cell phone surgically implanted in a tooth. When she gets hit in the head with a dryer door, she is unable to hang up her phone. Krzyzhtoff, whom Hedwig has just yelled at for putting her bra in the dryer, attempts to help Phyllis by pressing on her tooth.

The Criterion Collection re-released the film on DVD and Blu-ray Disc on June 25, 2019. The release includes new and archival special features.

== Awards and honors ==
| Year | Award ceremony | Category | Nominee | Result |
|---|---|---|---|---|
| 2001 | Berlin International Film Festival | Best Feature Film (Teddy Award) | | Won |
| 2001 | Sundance Film Festival | Grand Jury Prize | | Nominated |
| 2001 | Sundance Film Festival | Audience Award (Dramatic) | | Won |
| 2001 | Sundance Film Festival | Directing Award (Dramatic) | John Cameron Mitchell | Won |
| 2001 | National Board of Review, USA | Best Debut Director | John Cameron Mitchell | Won |
| 2001 | Gotham Awards | Open Palm Award (Best Debut Director) | John Cameron Mitchell | Won |
| 2001 | Los Angeles Film Critics Association Awards | New Generation Award | John Cameron Mitchell | Won |
| 2001 | Deauville Film Festival | CineLive Award | John Cameron Mitchell | Won |
| 2001 | Deauville Film Festival | Critics Award | John Cameron Mitchell | Won |
| 2001 | Deauville Film Festival | Grand Special Prize | John Cameron Mitchell | Won |
| 2001 | Gijón International Film Festival | Best Actor | John Cameron Mitchell | Won |
| 2001 | Montreal Comedy Festival | Special Jury Prize | | Won |
| 2001 | Provincetown International Film Festival | Best Feature | | Won |
| 2001 | San Francisco International Film Festival | Audience Award for Best Narrative Feature | | Won |
| 2001 | San Francisco International Lesbian & Gay Film Festival | Best First Feature | John Cameron Mitchell | Won |
| 2001 | Seattle International Film Festival | Best Actor | John Cameron Mitchell | Won |
| 2001 | Stockholm International Film Festival | Honorable Mention | | Won |
| 2002 | Golden Globe Awards | Golden Globe Award for Best Actor – Motion Picture Musical or Comedy | John Cameron Mitchell | Nominated |
| 2002 | Independent Spirit Awards | Best Feature | | Nominated |
| 2002 | Independent Spirit Awards | Best Cinematography | Frank G. DeMarco | Nominated |
| 2002 | Independent Spirit Awards | Best Director | John Cameron Mitchell | Nominated |
| 2002 | Independent Spirit Awards | Best First Screenplay | John Cameron Mitchell | Nominated |
| 2002 | Independent Spirit Awards | Best Male Lead | John Cameron Mitchell | Nominated |
| 2002 | Phoenix Film Critics Society Awards | Best Use of Previously Published or Recorded Music | | Won |
| 2002 | L.A. Outfest | Best Performance by an Actor in a Leading Role | John Cameron Mitchell | Won |
| 2002 | L.A. Outfest | Best Performance by an Actress in a Supporting Role | Miriam Shor | Won |
| 2002 | Florida Film Critics Circle Awards | Best Songs | | Won |
| 2002 | Florida Film Critics Circle Awards | Newcomer of the Year | John Cameron Mitchell | Won |
| 2002 | GLAAD Media Awards | Outstanding Film (Limited Release) | | Won |

== See also ==
- Breakfast on Pluto (2005)
- Velvet Goldmine (1998)
- List of cult films
- Transgender in film and television
