= John Steven Sutherland =

American singer

John Steven Sutherland (born 11 March 1983) is an American pop singer signed with Fearless Management. Formerly he was a member of an American boy band project called B3.

== Beginnings ==
John Sutherland was discovered Mickey Mouse Club casting director Matt Casella, as John shined through thousands of hopefuls throughout the United States to land a role on a Disney Channel television show. John relocated to New York City after performing and training in over 15 regional theater productions in Ohio. John was cast for a feature role in episodes of NBC crime drama “Law and Order”.

== In the boy band B3 (2001–2004) ==
In 2001, Sutherland became a founding member of the boy band B3 alongside Timothy Andrew Cruz (Tim Cruz) and Rod Michael. When Michael left by end of 2002, he was replaced by Blair Madison Late. B3 was successful in Europe particularly Germany and were signed to BMG (in Germany). Their biggest hit was "I.O.I.O.", a cover of a Bee Gees song that was number 4 in Germany in 2002 and was in charts in many European and Asian countries (including Austria, Switzerland, Poland, Hungary, the Czech Republic, Thailand). Their first album First went gold in Germany.

Discography with B3:

- Albums - First (February 2002), N.Y.B3 (March 2003), N.Y.B3 Special Edition (November 2003) and Living for the Weekend (September 2004)
- Singles - "You Win Again" (2001), "Nightfever" (2002), "I.O.I.O" (2002), "Tonight and Forever" (2002), "You're My Angel" (2003), "We Got the Power" (2003), "All the Girls" (2003), "Move Your Body" (2004) and "Can't Fight the Feeling" (2004)

== Solo career (2005–present) ==
When B3 disbanded in December 2004, Sutherland continued with a solo career with Fearless Management.

He has also worked with producer/songwriter/composer Peter Wolf creating a duet for the title track of the animated feature film The Nutcracker and Mouse King. He sang the lead male vocals alongside American artist Sophie B. Hawkins.

Wolf also organized for him a series of concerts in Austria. The project was called "Sound Cloud" and the music was released on the album Sense-ation distributed by Universal Records.

== See also ==
- B3 (band)
