= The Gold Dust Orphans =

The Gold Dust Orphans is a fringe theater company based in Boston and Provincetown, Massachusetts. It was founded in 1995 by writer/performer Ryan Landry, Scott Martino, Afrodite (aka Andre Shoals), and Billy Hough. It is a group of actors, musicians, dancers, writers and visual artists dedicated to the production of shows that are often based on works of film, theater, and popular culture. Many of the roles are played in the classical tradition by men in drag.

== Production history ==
1993

- Psycho Beach Party, Camille

1998

- How Mrs. Grinchly Swiped Christmas

1999

- Charlie's Angels & the Case of the Tobacco Heiress, Medea

2000

- The Bunny Trail, Joan of Arkansas

2001

- Madame Ex

2002

- Rosemary's Baby - The Musical!, Camille, Scarrie, Joan Crawford's Christmas On the Pole

2003

- The Bad Seed, The Gulls, Who's Afraid of the Virgin Mary?

2004

- Pussy On The House, The Septic Wives, The Exorcissy, Who's Afraid of the Virgin Mary? (revival)

2005

- A T Stop Named Denial, The Golden Squirells, Cinderella Rocks!

2006

- Death Of A Saleslady, Cleopatra the Musical, The Twilight Zone, Silent Night Of The Lambs

2007

- The Plexiglass Menagerie, The Milkman Always Comes Twice, Silent Night Of The Lambs (revival)

2008

- Medea, Whizzin'!, All About Christmas Eve

2009

- Of Mice and Mink, Willie Wanker and the Hershey Highway, Valet Of The Dolls, All About Christmas Eve (revival)

2010

- Phantom of the Oprah, The Gulls (revival), Mrs. Grinchly's Christmas Carol

2011

- Pussy on the House (revival), Peter Pansy, The Rocky Horror Show, Mrs. Grinchly's Christmas Carol (revival)

2012

- The Little Pricks, Mary Poppers, Rudolph the Red Necked Reindeer

2013

- Mildred Fierce, Pornocchio

2014

- It's a Horrible Life, Snow White and the Seven Bottoms, Jesus Christ, It's Christmas!

2015

- Thoroughly Muslim Millie, Little Orphan Tranny

2016

- Legally Blind - The Helen Keller Musical, Murder on the Polar Express

2017

- Greece - A Highschool Musical, Whatever Happened to Baby Jesus?

2018

- Brokelahomo, Nightmare on Elf Street

2019

- The Ebonic Woman, Christmas on Uranus

2021

- Mrs. Grinchly's Christmas Carol (revival)

2022

- Little Christmas Tree Shop of Horrors

2023

- The Rocky Menorah Christmas Show

2024

- Rosemary's Baby Jesus

2025

- Sweeney Claus: The Demon Father of Sleet Street

== Awards and nominations ==
2007

- Elliot Norton Awards
- Nominated for Outstanding Production by a Fringe Company - Silent Night of The Lambs

2008

- Elliot Norton Awards
- Nominated for Best Choreography - All About Christmas Eve

2010

- Elliot Norton Awards
- Won for Best Director, Small or Fringe Company- Larry Coen for Phantom of the Oprah
- Won for Outstanding Musical Performance- Jeffery Roberson aka Varla Jean Merman in Phantom of the Oprah
- Nominated for Outstanding Musical Production - Phantom of the Oprah
- Nominated for Outstanding Design, Midsize, Small, or Fringe Company -Phantom of the Oprah

2011

- Elliot Norton Awards
- Nominated for Outstanding New Script - Ryan Landry for Mrs. Grinchley's Christmas Carol
- Won for Outstanding Production (Fringe Theater) - Mrs. Grinchley's Christmas Carol

2012

- Elliot Norton Awards
- Nominated for Outstanding Design (Fringe, Small, Medium Theater) - The Rocky Horror Show
- Nominated for Outstanding Performance by an Actor - Scott Martino for The Little Pricks
- Nominated for Outstanding Musical Performance by an Actor - Gene Dante for The Rocky Horror Show
- Nominated for Outstanding Musical Production (Small/Midsize Theater) - Peter Pansy

2013

- Elliot Norton Awards
- Nominated for Outstanding Design, Midsize, Small or Fringe Theater - Mildred Fierce
- Nominated for Outstanding Musical Production by a Midsize, Small or Fringe Company - Mildred Fierce
- Nominated for Outstanding Director, Small or Fringe Theater - James P. Byrne for Mildred Fierce
- Won for Outstanding New Script - Ryan Landry for Mildred Fierce

2014

- Nominated for Outstanding Musical Production by a Mid-Size/Small Company - It's a Horrible Life
- Nominated for Outstanding Musical Performance by an Actor - Paul Melendy as George Bailey - It's a Horrible Life

2016

- Won Outstanding Musical Performance by an Actor - Tim Lawton as Mary Cheney - Thoroughly Muslim Millie
- Nominated for Best Musical - Thoroughly Muslim Millie

2023

- Won Outstanding Costume Design, Midsize or Small Theater - Scott Martino - Little Christmas Tree Shop of Horrors,
- Nominated for Outstanding Musical Production - Little Christmas Tree Shop of Horrors
- Nominated for Outstanding Leading Performance in a Musical - Tim Lawton - Little Christmas Tree Shop of Horrors
- Nominated for Outstanding Musical Direction - Tim Lawton and Tad McKitterick -Little Christmas Tree Shop of Horrors
- Nominated for Outstanding Choreography - Briana Scafidi - Little Christmas Tree Shop of Horrors
- Nominated for Outstanding Scenic Design, Midsize or Small Theater - Scott Martino - Little Christmas Tree Shop of Horrors
- Nominated for Outstanding Lighting Design, Midsize or Small Theater - Matthew Brian Cost - Little Christmas Tree Shop of Horrors
- Nominated for Outstanding New Script - Ryan Landry - Little Christmas Tree Shop of Horrors

2025

- Nominated for Best Director, Small - Kiki Samko - Rosemary's Baby Jesus

2026

- Nominated for Outstanding Choreography - Hallie Nowicki - Sweeney Claus: The Demon Father of Sleet Street
- Nominated for Outstanding Ensemble - Sweeney Claus: The Demon Father of Sleet Street
