= The Love Letter Is Dead =

Single by Gene Dante and The Future Starlets
- Released: February 10, 2010
- Recorded: 2010 at Q Division Studios in Somerville, MA
- Genre: Glam, Rock, Pop
- Length: 4:34
- Label: Omnirox Entertainment
- Songwriter: Eugene J Ware
- Producer: Peter Lubin

Gene Dante and The Future Starlets singles chronology
"'The Romantic Lead'" (2009)	"The Love Letter Is Dead" (2010)

"The Love Letter Is Dead" is a studio single by Gene Dante and The Future Starlets recorded in November 2009 at Q Division Studios and released in February 2010 by Omnirox Entertainment. Upon its premier, the single placed No. 7 on the local radio airplay charts. It remained on the charts for 16 months through September 2011, peaking at No. 2 in August 2011.

== Track listing ==
1. The Love Letter Is Dead

== Personnel ==
- Gene Dante - lead and harmony vocals
- Alice Lee Scott - lead guitar
- Jim Collins - bass, harmony vocals
- Tamora Gooding - drums
- Erik Andersen - rhythm guitar

=== Additional musicians and instruments ===
- Female Harmony Vocals: Lisa Van Oosterum
- Mellotron and Synthesizer: Peter Lubin
- Orchestral Arrangements: Frank Ciampi

=== Production ===
- Producer: Peter Lubin
- Engineer: Jon Lupfer
- Mixed by: Peter Lubin & Jon Lupfer
- Assistant engineer: Jon Lukason
- Lyrics and music by Gene Dante
- Recorded at Q Division Studios in Somerville, MA
- Mastering: Mark Donahue (Sound Mirror)

=== Graphics ===
- Art direction and graphics: Gene Dante
