= Gene Dante and The Future Starlets =

American band

- Origin: Boston, Massachusetts, United States
- Genres: Glam rock, pop rock
- Years active: 2005–present
- Label: Omnirox Entertainment
- Members: Gene Dante (Vocals, Guitar); Alice Lee Scott (Guitar); Tamora Gooding (Drums, Percussion); Jim Collins (Bass, Vocals); Erik Andersen (Guitar, Vocals)
- Past members: Mark White; Eddie Nowik; Mathew Foster
- Website: www.GeneDante.com

Gene Dante and The Future Starlets is an American glam-rock band based out of Boston, Massachusetts, United States.

== History ==
The first incarnation of The Future Starlets was formed in 2005 by Gene Dante, who had previously been pursuing an acting career as well as fronting the Brian Eno tribute band Project Eno. Wanting to take his own original music to the next level, Dante recruited “Dark Mark” White (upright bass and vocals), “Crazy Eddie” Nowik (guitar), and Mathew "Cutty" Foster (drums and vocals). They released their debut album, with the self-titled Gene Dante and The Future Starlets, in early 2006 under Surreal Records/Multimedia.

Due to changing priorities in 2007, The Future Starlets underwent a complete lineup change, and thus the second (and current) incarnation was born. Tamora Gooding (AxeMunkee, All The Queen's Men), who had worked with Dante before in Project Eno, took over drums and percussion, and Jim Collins (The Buckners, MEandJOANCOLLINS, Eddie Japan) came in on bass. Soon thereafter, Alice Lee Scott (Mistle Thrush) was added on lead guitar after Dante successfully coaxed her out of retirement. They released their second album, The Romantic Lead, produced by veteran A&R executive Peter Lubin (The Pixies, Peter Gabriel), in February 2009 under Omnirox Entertainment. Looking to add a fifth member, Gene and the Starlets brought in Erik Andersen on rhythm guitar and keyboard soon after the release of the album.

The Starlets released the first music video off The Romantic Lead in February 2009 for the single “C Star”, directed by Michael Pope (Dresden Dolls, Amanda Palmer, Ben Folds).

In April 2009, Gene Dante and The Future Starlets placed second out of 23 other Boston bands in the 31st annual WBCN Rock & Roll Rumble. Using their winnings, they recorded and released their single "The Love Letter is Dead", also produced by Peter Lubin, in February 2010.

In 2009, Dante was nominated for “Best Male Vocalist” in the Boston Phoenix/101.7 WFNX Best Music Poll of 2009.

The Starlets released the next music video off The Romantic Lead for the second single “A Madness to His Method”, also directed by Michael Pope, in April 2009. The video was picked up and added into regular rotation on MTV’s LOGO network.

In the summer of 2011, Dante reprised his role as Hedwig alongside Lisa Van Oosterum (Yitzhak) in the Zany Hijinx production of Hedwig and the Angry Inch. Most of The Future Starlets were also featured in the production as Hedwig’s band with Collins as Jacek, Andersen as Skszp, and Gooding as Schlatko. The show toured all over New England with multiple showings in Portland, Boston, Provincetown, Hartford, and Dedham.

Gene Dante and The Future Starlets continued their work in the theater scene in the fall of 2011 when they were hired as the live house band for The Gold Dust Orphans production of The Rocky Horror Show at Club Oberon. Dante played the role of Brad Majors and earned an Elliot Norton Award nomination for Outstanding Musical Performance in a Small/Midsize Theater.

In September 2012, Dante was cast as Mary 2 in the American Repertory Theater production of The Lily's Revenge at Club Oberon.

Gene Dante and The Future Starlets have since begun pre-production for their third album.

== Discography ==
=== Albums ===
| Year | Title | Label |
|---|---|---|
| 2006 | Gene Dante and The Future Starlets | Surreal Records/Multimedia |
| 2009 | The Romantic Lead | Omnirox Entertainment |

=== Singles ===
| Year | Title | Label |
|---|---|---|
| 2010 | "The Love Letter is Dead" | Omnirox Entertainment |
| 2013 | "We Are All Whores" | self-release |
| 2014 | "Hand Me Your Razors" | self-release |
| 2015 | "Girl On A Unicycle" | self-release |

=== Music videos ===
| Year | Song | Director |
|---|---|---|
| 2008 | "C Star" | Michael Pope |
| 2009 | "A Madness to His Method" | Michael Pope |
| 2015 | "We Are All Whores" | Herschel Smith Jr. |
| 2017 | "Girl On A Unicycle" | Herschel Smith Jr. |
| 2018 | "Hand Me Your Razors" | Herschel Smith Jr. |
