= Give It All Away (Ben Jelen album) =

Studio album by Ben Jelen
- Released: 2004
- Recorded: 2003
- Genre: Pop rock
- Label: Maverick
- Producer: Ben Jelen

Ben Jelen chronology
Give It All Away (2004)	Rejected (EP) (2005)

Professional ratings
Review scores
Source	Rating
Allmusic	3/5 stars

Give It All Away is the debut album by Scottish-American singer/songwriter Ben Jelen, released in 2004 via Maverick Records.

The lead single, "Come On", peaked at #58 on the Billboard Hot Singles Sales chart and failed to appear on the Billboard Hot 100, despite Jelen being featured on TRL in January 2004. Give It All Away subsequently debuted and peaked at #113 on the Billboard 200 albums chart, #1 on Billboard's Top Heatseekers chart and #13 on the Top Internet Albums chart. Jelen and Maverick Records subsequently parted ways and Jelen released his subsequent material independently until he was signed by Linda Perry's Custard Records.

The song "Setting of the Sun" is featured on an episode of Smallville, and "Falling Down" is featured on an episode of Las Vegas. The song "Come On" is sampled in a trailer for Monsters University.

== Track listing ==
1. "Come On"
2. "Rocks"
3. "She'll Hear You"
4. "Give It All Away"
5. "Every Step"
6. "Christine"
7. "Wicked Little Town"
8. "Falling Down"
9. "Stay"
10. "Criminal"
11. "Slow Down"
12. "Setting of the Sun"
