= Fearless Management =

Fearless Management is a New York City–based music management (talent management) company founded in 2003 by Joseph Janus, the acting president and chief executive officer.

== Overview ==
After working in fashion and model management, Joseph Janus created Fearless Management to manage and develop artists and Fearless Productions/Intrepid Noise to produce music.

Janus discovered Ben Jelen, a piano-based singer-songwriter, and brokered a deal with Maverick Records to release his debut, "Give It All Away" in 2004, which immediately entered no. 1 on the Billboard Heatseekers Chart. In 2005, Janus started Fearless Management Records, a record label specializing in releasing unsigned talent, as well as rarities and EPs from established artists. The first release on the label was Ben Jelen's 2005 Rejected EP. Other Fearless Management clients include Ben Jelen, John Sutherland, Tim Cruz, Marcus Monroe, and Sophie B. Hawkins.
