= Ben Jelen =

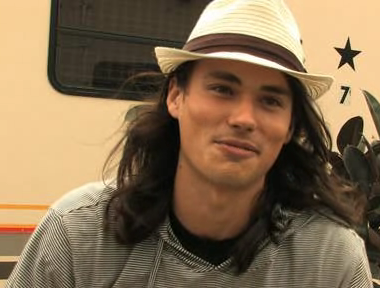

Background information
- Born: 8 July 1979 (age 47); Edinburgh, Scotland
- Origin: New York City, United States
- Genres: Pop, pop rock
- Occupations: Singer-songwriter, musician
- Instruments: Vocals, guitar, piano, violin
- Years active: 2004–present
- Labels: Maverick (2003–2004); Fearless Management (2004–2005); Custard (2006–present)

Benjamin Ivan Jelen (born 8 July 1979) is a Scottish-born American former singer-songwriter who plays the piano, violin, and guitar. He has lived in Scotland, England, Texas, New Jersey and New York. His career has been characterized by near-stardom, with his debut album, Give It All Away peaking at No. 113 on the Billboard 200 list. As of 2011, he is on indefinite hiatus from his solo career and is working with a new band, along with former Deuce Project member Josh McMillan known as Under The Elephant.

== Early life ==
Jelen attended high school in San Antonio, Texas briefly, as a freshman at Northside Health Careers High School. He completed high school at Princeton High School in Princeton, New Jersey and graduated from Rutgers University with a degree in biology. After that, he moved to New York City to work as a producer and sound engineer at a local recording studio.

== Music career ==
=== 2004: Give It All Away ===
Jelen was discovered by Joseph Janus of Fearless Management, who originally wanted to sign him as a model. Instead, Jelen handed him a demo, and shortly thereafter, he was signed to a label and released his debut album Give It All Away in May 2004, promoted by appearances on TRL, AOL Breakers and Rock the Vote. The album also debuted at No. 13 on the Top Internet Albums chart, No. 120 on the Billboard Comprehensive Albums chart and No. 113 on the Billboard 200 albums chart in the United States, making it eligible for the Top Heatseekers chart, a chart of artists who have never entered the top 100 of the Billboard 200. The album debuted at No. 1 on the Top Heatseekers chart.

Debut single "Come On" was a hit, reaching the MTV top 20. It also debuted at No. 58 on the Hot Singles Sales chart. Apart from "Give It All Away" being included as a B-side to the "Come On" single, no other track from the album was released as a single.

=== 2005–2006: Independent period ===
Following his debut album, Jelen left Maverick Records and independently released the EP Rejected through Fearless Management Records in 2005. He wrote and recorded a song for a compilation album for Tori Amos' RAINN organization and joined the Natural Resources Defense Council (NRDC) and Wildlife Works. Jelen also appeared on the compilation album Breaking for the Holidays in 2006 with his self-produced cover of Joni Mitchell's "River" through Breaking Records.

=== 2007: Custard Records deal and Ex-Sensitive ===
Jelen performed at the 2007 South by Southwest (SXSW) conference and music festival in Austin, Texas, in a lineup that also included Taylor Hicks, Amy Winehouse, Tom Morello, Mika, Martina Topley Bird, The Fratellis, Bloc Party, Paolo Nutini, Rodrigo y Gabriela, Mogwai and Spoon.

Jelen's second full-length album, Ex-Sensitive, was released on 17 July 2007. The album, formerly titled East and Pulse, was produced by Linda Perry and mixed by Bill Bottrell.

=== 2009 – Under The Elephant ===
Jelen has placed his solo career on hold to focus on a new group Under The Elephant. The band consists of Jelen, Josh McMillan, Lisa McMillan, Tina Mathieu and James Darwin "Jimmy" Stull. The group is, as of 1 March 2010, unsigned.

== Personal life ==
Jelen met model Fern Palmer in a New York City night club on 6 January 2004. The couple married on 28 June 2009 in a private garden wedding in Palmer's hometown of Cleveland, Georgia. Jelen and Palmer have one child together, a daughter named Tallulah Rose Jelen born in 2013. As of 23 April 2019, the couple is separated.

In November 2018, Jelen completed a Ph.D. program in Environmental Science at Rutgers University, successfully defending his dissertation titled, "The Evolution of Microbial Electron Transfer on Earth."

== Television and film ==
Jelen's music has been featured on the TV shows One Tree Hill, Smallville and Las Vegas, and was used to promote the Academy Award-nominated Finding Neverland starring Johnny Depp and Kate Winslet. "Come On" also features in the film Love Wrecked with Amanda Bynes and in 2007, the instrumental version of "Come On" was featured trailers for The Bucket List. His song, "Where Do We Go" also appeared in the film Fired Up. In 2013, Jelen's single "Come On" was used in promotions for the film Monsters University.

Jelen, a graduate of Princeton High School, also guest starred on the Princeton-set television show House as a doctor applying for a fellowship in the episode "Kids".

== Discography ==
=== Albums ===
- Give It All Away (2004) No. 113 US
- Rejected (2005)
- Ex-Sensitive (2007)
- Wreckage (EP) (2008)

=== Digital-only albums ===
- Sessions@AOL (2004)

=== Singles ===
- "Come On/Give It All Away" (2004) (#58 U.S. Hot Singles Sales)
- "Where Do We Go" (2007)
- "Wreckage" (2008)

=== Other contributions ===
1. "Come On" on the compilation "CG Vibes: Music That Gives Back", available for five months in 2004 and supplied free with The Corrs' Borrowed Heaven, Toby Lightman's Little Things, Brandy's Afrodisiac and his own Give It All Away
2. "Truth" on the compilation "For the Next X: A Benefit CD for RAINN" (2004)
3. "Talking About A Revolution" (cover of Tracy Chapman's song of the same name) on the Russell Simmons/Babyface compilation Wake Up Everybody (2004)
4. "Forever in Our Hearts" (playing keyboards and violin), a single for tsunami relief (2005)
5. "River" (cover of the Joni Mitchell song of the same name) on the compilation Breaking for the Holidays (2006)
6. "Woman" (cover of John Lennon's song of the same name) on Instant Karma: The Amnesty International Campaign to Save Darfur (2007)
