= Stephen Trask =

American composer (born 1966)

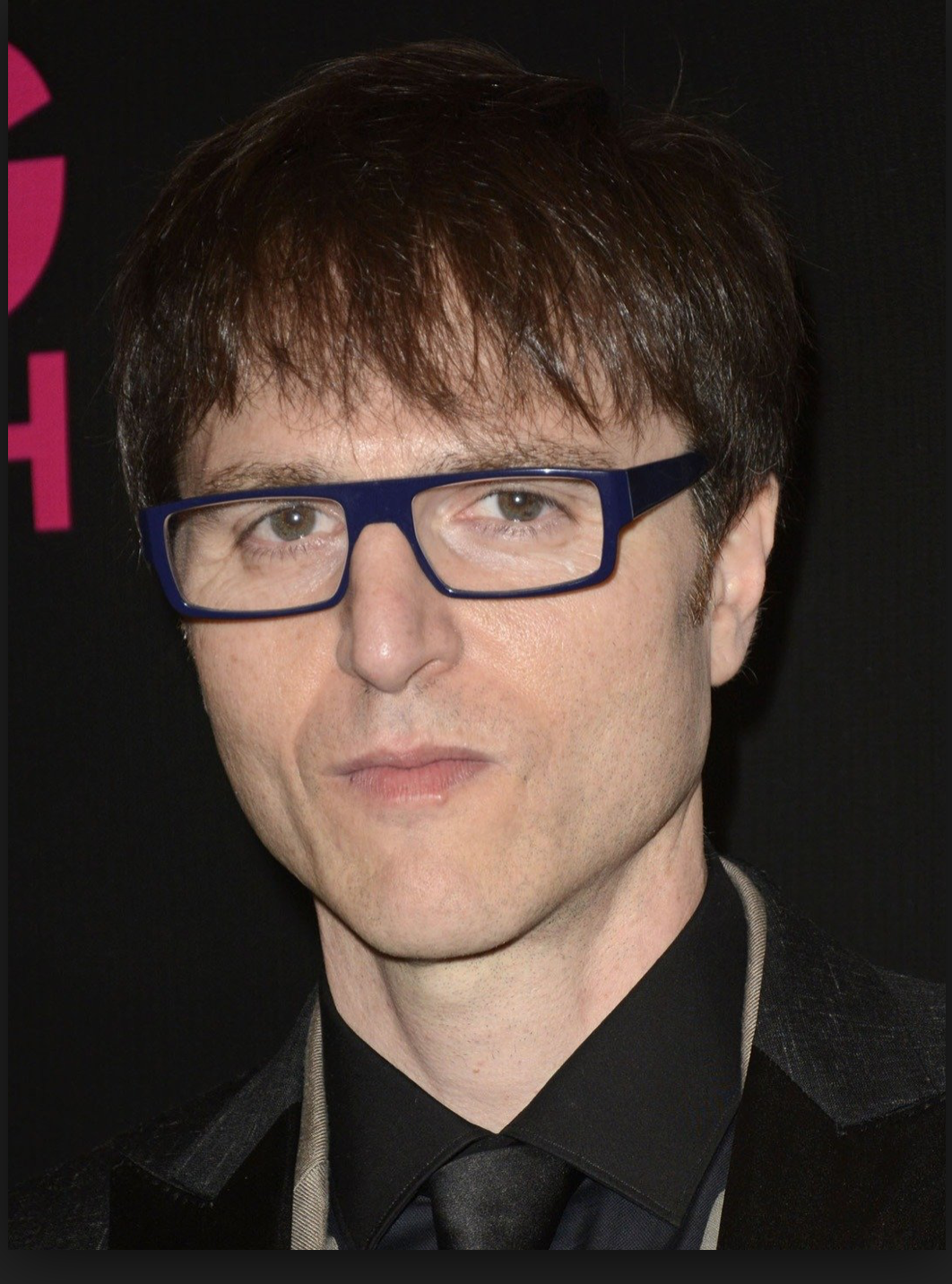
- Trask at Hedwig and the Angry Inch opening night, April 2014
- Born: Stephen R. Schwartz; August 29, 1966 (age 59); United States
- Occupations: Musician; composer
- Spouse: Michael Trask

Stephen Trask (born Stephen R. Schwartz; born August 29, 1966) is an American musician and composer who graduated from Wesleyan University. He was the music director and house band member at the New York City club Squeezebox, where he performed with stars such as Debbie Harry, Lene Lovich, Hole, Green Day, and Joey Ramone.

Trask composed the music and lyrics for the stage musical Hedwig and the Angry Inch (also a 2001 film), about a struggling rock star named Hedwig. Trask's real-life band Cheater performed as Hedwig's band "The Angry Inch". He received an Obie Award for the play and a Grammy Award nomination for the movie.

In 2014, the show saw its first Broadway incarnation, opening that April at the Belasco Theatre and winning the year's Tony Award for Best Revival of a Musical. The production closed on September 13, 2015. A national tour of the show began at San Francisco's Golden Gate Theatre on October 2, 2016.

Trask has worked on five films with filmmaker Paul Weitz. He composed the score for 2004's In Good Company and 2006's American Dreamz, for which he also co-wrote the numerous songs the contestants sing, as well as the 2009 film Cirque du Freak: The Vampire's Assistant. Trask also scored the 2003 films Camp and The Station Agent, as well as Dreamgirls (2006), In the Land of Women (2007), The Savages (2007), and The Back-up Plan (2010), among other works. He scored the 2010 film Little Fockers, a sequel to both Meet the Parents (2000) and Meet the Fockers (2004). In 2013, Trask scored the films Lovelace, directed by Rob Epstein and Jeffery Friedman, and Admission, directed by Paul Weitz.

== Personal life ==
Trask resides in Lexington, Kentucky, with his husband Michael Trask, who is a professor at the University of Kentucky. They were married by their neighbor, former state senator Kathy Stein.

Trask grew up in Connecticut in a Jewish household. He also went to Hebrew school and had a Bar Mitzvah. Both his parents were involved in the synagogue and his father was head of the youth program there. His mother's maiden name is Rhodes.

Trask announced he was non-binary in May 2021, and goes by he/him and she/her pronouns.

== Influences ==
Trask has named John Lennon, Paul McCartney, Willie Nelson, Chuck Berry, Duke Ellington, Cecil Taylor, Henry Threadgill, Lou Reed, and Captain Beefheart as his primary musical influences.
