= Eric Abraham (producer) =

Film producer and former journalist (born 1954)

Eric Anthony Abraham
- Born: 1953 or 1954 (age 71–72); Cape Town, South Africa
- Education: University of Cape Town
- Occupations: Screen and theatre producer
- Years active: 1981–present
- Spouse: Sigrid Rausing (m. 2003)

Eric Anthony Abraham (born 1953 or 1954) is a South African-British producer and former journalist and activist. Born and raised in apartheid-era South Africa, he first worked as a correspondent for the South African News Agency, which reported on various anti-apartheid activities. Abraham moved in 1977 to England, where he lived in exile for 15 years until the end of apartheid. He has since worked in theatre and screen in both countries, co-founding the London-based Portobello Productions as well as Cape Town's Fugard Theatre, which he built as a home for Isango Portobello theatre company.

== Early life and education ==
Eric Anthony Abraham was born in 1953 or 1954 in the Wynberg area of Cape Town, South Africa, and grew up in Rondebosch. His father was a naval commander who had arrived in South Africa from Hungary before World War II to escape antisemitism.

Abraham attended South African College High School (SACS), where he participated in school productions and ran a film society.

Abraham studied law at the University of Cape Town, but has said that he was "hardly ever at lectures because there was something more important in those days" as a student union leader and activist.

== Career ==
=== Journalism ===
Abraham began his career in journalism, beginning as a correspondent for the South African News Agency (SANA), which was later infiltrated by police spy Craig Williamson. (Note: it is unclear who established SANA. By 1979 it was being run out of Botswana, and later, dissident in exile Heinz Klug changed it into the Solidarity News Service.)

Abraham was placed under a five-year banning order and house arrest by the apartheid government, without charge or explanation, on 29 November 1976. At this time, he was a leader in the student union (NUSAS, and also worked as a stringer for the BBC and The Guardian. His own father reported his "subversive" activities to the South African authorities. After receiving death threats, Abraham fled South Africa to Botswana clandestinely with external help in January 1977.

=== Producing ===
Abraham could not return to his home country until apartheid ended, and he was granted political asylum in the UK, where he found a job as a producer for the BBC television programme Panorama as well as being a BBC radio correspondent.

Abraham co-founded Portobello Productions in 1987 (Note: First incorporated in 1987 by Keith Dungate as Portobello Pictures, as of 2026 registered as Portobello Films and Television Limited.) which has been responsible for many successful independent film, TV, and theatre productions. Also on the team at Portobello as of October 2026 are Jack Sidey and director/producer Jan Svěrák. Among his screen productions were the 1991 TV drama film A Murder of Quality (based on the book by John le Carré), starring Denholm Elliott and Glenda Jackson, and the long-running crime series Dalziel and Pascoe starring Warren Clarke. He was also the producer of the Academy Award-winning film Kolya (1996).

Abraham's notable theatre productions included a revival of the pioneering 1959 musical King Kong, which launched the international careers of Miriam Makeba and Hugh Masekela among others; Abraham's new production opened in 2017 at the Fugard Theatre and was subsequently staged at the Nelson Mandela Theatre in Johannesburg.

Abraham was a co-producer on the 2026 drama film The Smell of Apples, co-written and directed by John Trengove. The film was based on the 1993 novel of the same name by Mark Behr. It is directed by Trengrove, and co-written by him

=== Cape Town theatre ===
In 2009, Abraham was the sole financial patron of the Isango Portobello theatre company, which was founded in 2000. It began operating out of a church hall and some converted shipping containers in the Cape Flats suburbs of Athlone or Khayelitsha. In 2009, Abraham announced that he would be building a new theatre in Cape Town to serve as a base for the troupe, then under British-born artistic director Mark Dornford-May, along with his wife Pauline Malefane. The Sacks Futeran Building in District Six was converted into a theatre, named the Fugard Theatre after playwright Athol Fugard, who wrote a new play for the opening of the theatre in March 2010. In November of that year, Isango Portobello was expelled from the Fugard owing to "financial irregularities"; Malefane and then Dornford-May resigned. Protests targeting Abraham took place, but the company was also criticised for not engaging Coloured audiences, and Dornford-May's management style was criticised as having become "authoritarian". Attendance at recent performances had been poor, and Abraham pointed to the initial employment of 20 ushers, who were mostly family and friends of the cast. The theatre finally closed during the COVID-19 pandemic in 2021. Isango continues to operate under Dornford-May and Malefane now named "Isango Ensemble".

== Recognition and awards ==
Kolya (1996) won many awards, including the Academy Award for Best Film and the Golden Globe Award for Best Foreign Language Film.

In 2019, Abraham received a Spectemur Agendo Award from his high school, SACS, for his contributions to civil liberties and the performing arts.

== Personal life ==
In 2003 Abraham married Swedish philanthropist and anthropologist Sigrid Rausing, heir to the Swedish company Tetra Pak. In 2005, Rausing and Abraham co-founded Portobello Books, which later in that year acquired Granta magazine.

== Filmography ==
=== Film ===
- Bintley's Mozart (1987) – documentary
- Life and Extraordinary Adventures of Private Ivan Chonkin (1994)
- Kolya (1996)
- Mojo (1997)
- The War Zone (1999)
- Dark Blue World (2001)
- Birthday Girl (2001)
- Empties (2007)
- Quiet Chaos (2008)
- Kooky (2010)
- The Forgiveness of Blood (2011)
- Ida (2013)
- Three Brothers (2014)
- Moffie (2019)
- Bethlehem Night (2022)
- Four Mothers (2024)
- The Smell of Apples (2026)

=== Television ===
- Panorama, BBC (1981–1983) – 7 episodes
- Seal Morning (1986) – 6 episodes
- ScreenPlay (1986) – 1 episode
- Lost Belongings (1987) – Miniseries
- Danny, the Champion of the World (1989) – television film
- Othello (1989) – television film
- The Maestro and the Diva (1990) – documentary
- A Murder of Quality (1991) – television film
- Still Life at the Penguin Cafe (1991) – television film
- True Tilda (1997)
- Dalziel and Pascoe (1997–1998) — 11 episodes
- Falls the Shadow: The Life and Times of Athol Fugard (2012) – documentary
