= Kings of the Water =

2009 novel by Mark Behr

First edition (publ. Abacus Books)

Kings of the Water is the third novel from writer Mark Behr, published in November 2009.

== Plot summary ==
It is the story of thirty-five-year-old Michiel (Michael) Steyn who returns to the family farm in South Africa for his mother's funeral. This is Steyn's first return to South Africa in fifteen years, after leaving in 1987 to escape from a scandal he was involved in while he was an officer in the South African navy. Steyn is from both Afrikaans and English extraction and is now a US citizen. He lives with his partner Kamil Cassis (who is half Palestinian, half Jewish) on the boundary of San Francisco's Castro district. The book engages specifically South African questions of racism, guilt, responsibility and the tentativeness of forgiveness, but the novel's ending asks for an international reading, in particular through its foreshadowing of US foreign and domestic policy in the era of George W. Bush. Kings of the Water also offers a glimpse at an older version of a marginal character from Embrace as well as allusion to the extended fishing scene from The Smell of Apples, in this way seeming to insist that all three of these novels be read and understood in relation to one another.

== Criticism ==
Kate Saunders in The Times (November 2009) reviewed it as follows: "Superbly written, thoughtful and unflinching, this terrific novel explores the mentality of the Afrikaner male — with wonderfully poetic use of the Afrikaans language." Novelist Christopher Hope, reviewing for The Guardian (January 2010), noted that the book shared the spirit of Chekhov's The Cherry Orchard and called the novel "one of the most moving to come out of South Africa in many years." Shortly after publication, Kings of the Water was shortlisted for The Commonwealth Book Award, Africa Region.
