= Thor Fields =

American actor and musician

- Born: Thor Fields; September 19, 1968 (age 56); New York City, New York, U.S.
- Occupation(s): Actor, musician
- Spouse: Julie Reyburn
- Website: http://www.ledblimpie.com/

Thor Fields (born September 19, 1968) is an American actor and guitarist.

== Career ==
Fields began his career in television commercials and made his Broadway debut in The King and I in 1978. This was the first revival starring Yul Brynner and Constance Towers. Fields was understudy for the role of Louis (the teacher's son) and also swing for the Royal Children. Fields was also in the Turgenev play A Month in the Country (Roundabout Theater Company) starring Tammy Grimes, Farley Granger and Amanda Plummer.

In 1980, Fields was cast as Tom of Warwick in the 20th Anniversary revival production of Camelot starring Richard Burton, Christine Ebersole and Richard Muenz. In 1981, Burton was replaced by Richard Harris. Fields and the production continued to tour as well as play Broadway's Winter Garden Theatre, where it was filmed for HBO.

Fields appeared in numerous productions, including Mensch Meier at the Manhattan Theatre Club, Romeo in Romeo and Juliet at the American Theater of Actors, and Puck in A Midsummer Night's Dream.

Fields played the role of Erich Aldrich on the NBC soap opera The Doctors from 1977 until 1980. In 1981, he appeared with Carroll O'Connor in an episode of Archie Bunker's Place and in 1983 played Jasper Kent in Horatio Alger Updated: Frank and Fearless (ABC). On the big screen, Fields played Danny, Shelley Long's son in Hello Again, and appeared in the film Misplaced starring John Cameron Mitchell.

== Personal life ==
Thor Fields currently lives in the Hell's Kitchen neighborhood of Manhattan with his wife, singer Julie Reyburn.

== Filmography ==
=== Film ===
Year	Title	Role	Notes
1987	Hello Again	Danny Chadman	
1989	Misplaced	Ruffian's Friend	

=== Television ===
Year	Title	Role	Notes
1977–1980	The Doctors	Erich Aldrich	193 episodes
1981	Archie Bunker's Place	Larry	Episode: "Stephanie's Dance"
1982	Camelot	Tom of Warwick	Television film
1983	ABC Weekend Special	Jasper Kent	Episode: "Horatio Alger Updated: Frank and Fearless"
2020	Watch the Doctors: Where Are They Now?	—	Television special
