= The Smell of Apples (film) =

2026 South African drama film

- Afrikaans: Die Reuk van Appels
- Directed by: John Trengove
- Screenplay by: Christopher Ciancimino; John Trengove
- Based on: The Smell of Apples by Mark Behr
- Produced by: Eric Abraham; Jack Sidey; Cait Pansegrouw
- Starring: Dawian van der Westhuizen; Hilton Pelser; Maude Sandham; Alejandro Goic
- Cinematography: Lennert Hillege
- Edited by: Matthew Swanepoel
- Production companies: Portobello Productions; Cadence; BALDR Film; Quijote
- Release date: 11 September 2026 (TIFF)
- Running time: 104 minutes
- Countries: South Africa; Netherlands; Chile
- Languages: Afrikaans; English

The Smell of Apples (Afrikaans: Die Reuk van Appels) is a 2026 drama film co-written and directed by John Trengove. The film is a South African-Netherlands-Chilean co-production, and is based on the 1993 book of the same name by Mark Behr. It follows a sheltered 11-year-old white South African boy, who gradually comes to realise the horrors of the apartheid system.

The film had its world premiere in the Platform section of the 2026 Toronto International Film Festival on 11 September 2026, where it competed for the Platform Prize.

== Synopsis ==
Marnus, an 11-year-old boy, is living a protected, comfortable life in South Africa under apartheid in 1974. His father is a general in the SADF, and a mysterious guest, introduced as "Mr Smith" but soon revealed to be from Chile and meant to be kept secret from outsiders, arrives to stay with the family in his father (Marnus' grandfather]]'s room. One summer, he tells his parents that the grandson of their family's domestic worker stole his fishing rod. The police respond with extreme violence and badly beat the boy. This incident begins a series of events that make Marnus see his father, a well-known army general, in a disturbing new way. Over the next five days, as painful events unfold, Marnus realises that his family's perfect image hides hypocrisy, cruelty, and abuse.

== Cast ==
- Dawian van der Westhuizen as Marnus
- Hilton Pelser as Johan, Marnus' father
- Maude Sandham as Leonor, Marnus' mother
- Celeste Matthews Wannenburgh as Doreen, the family domestic servant
- Alejandro Goic as Mr. Smith
- Wian Carstens as Frikkie, cousin of Marnus
- Karoline Watson as Ilse, sister of Marnus
- Inge Beckmann as Karla, Leonor's sister
- Courtlin Baron as Neville, Doreen's grandson

== Production ==
The Smell of Apples (in Afrikaans, Die Reuk van Appels) is a coming-of-age drama film based on the 1993 novel The Smell of Apples by South African author Mark Behr, which was nominated for the Booker Prize in that year. It is director John Trengove's third feature film, and is an international co-production by Portobello Productions and Cadence in South Africa, BALDR Film in the Netherlands, and Quijote in Chile. Funding came from the NL Film Fund, and both English and Afrikaans dialogue is used in the film. The producers are Eric Abraham and Jack Sidey (Portobello); Cait Pansegrouw (Cadence) and Frank Hoeve (BALDR Films). It is the second South African film produced by Abraham and Sidey, who also co-produced the European Oscar-winning films Kolya and Ida.

Trengrove also co-wrote the script, along with Christopher Ciancimino. Lennert Hillege is responsible for the cinematography, and Matthew Swanepoel edited the film.

The film includes references to clandestine dealings between the South African Government and the Pinochet regime in Chile.

== Release ==
The Smell of Apples had its world premiere at the 2026 Toronto International Film Festival (TIFF) on 11 September 2026, in the Platform section.

The film closed the Warsaw International Film Festival on 15 October 2026, and had its Australian premiere on 16 October, having been selected to screen in competition at the Adelaide Film Festival in Adelaide, South Australia.

French sales and distribution company Cercamon has international sales rights to the film.

== Reception ==
TIFF reviewer Claire Daio wrote that the film "offers an intimate and radical insight into the apartheid regime from the perspective of those who benefited from it — whether they were aware of it or not. Behind every privilege and advantage lies a sordid truth that everyone prefers to ignore. By facing that reality head-on, director John Trengove offers us not only a brilliant exploration of human baseness, but also a stark reminder that responsibility is shared with those who pretend it does not exist". Guy Lodge, for Variety, called the film "beautifully crafted and impeccably paced", praising the writing ("impressively minimalist adaptation") and performances. He also noted the "toxic masculine influence", which has been a theme of the director's earlier films, The Wound (2017) and Manodrome (2023). ScreenAnarchy's Martin Kudlac calls it "a restrained, disquieting coming-of-age drama", which is "marked by a keen attention to period detail and a political context that remains largely implied rather than overtly articulated". The Film Stage praised the "wonderful cinematography by Lennert Hillege and impeccable direction from Trengove", as well as the performances, in particular those of Pelser and Sandham in their roles as the parents.

Cineuropa reviewer David Katz wrote: "Whilst it initially might seem claustrophobic and even repetitive, setting the film almost exclusively in the Erasmus family’s well-appointed, yet eerily traditional, suburban home creates a skin-crawling effect... Clearly isolating the pride, self-righteousness and entitlement of the country’s white minority ruling class, Trengove and his co-screenwriter, Chris Ciancimino, depict this historical era so forcefully by focusing on the perpetrators, rather than the victims – a knowingly queasy artistic choice recalling The Zone of Interest. Anyone with an interest in, or connection to, South Africa will appreciate what The Smell of Apples captures about its tortured psychology".

Audrey Kovtun, writing for The Michigan Daily, called the film "a masterclass in quiet storytelling", and "the unspoken gem of the [TIFF] festival". She praises the "beautiful cinematography and authentic performances", and also highlights the director's portrayal of gender roles. She concludes that the film "conveys power, youth and hatred in a remarkably quiet manner, substantiating its potency and justifying its need to exist at this very moment in history".

== Accolades ==
The Smell of Apples won the jury prize at the Adelaide Film Festival. The jury, which included Cameron Bailey, Xavier Samuel, Sandeep Ray, Tilda Cobham-Hervey, and Anna Vincent, published a citation reading: "the jury was especially impressed by a film made with both visual and narrative precision. For its devastating story of family, secrets and violence seen through the unblinking eyes of a child".

Award	Date of ceremony	Category	Recipient(s)	Result	Ref.
Toronto International Film Festival	20 September 2026	Platform Prize	The Smell of Apples	Nominated	
