= Nakhane =

South African singer-songwriter and actor

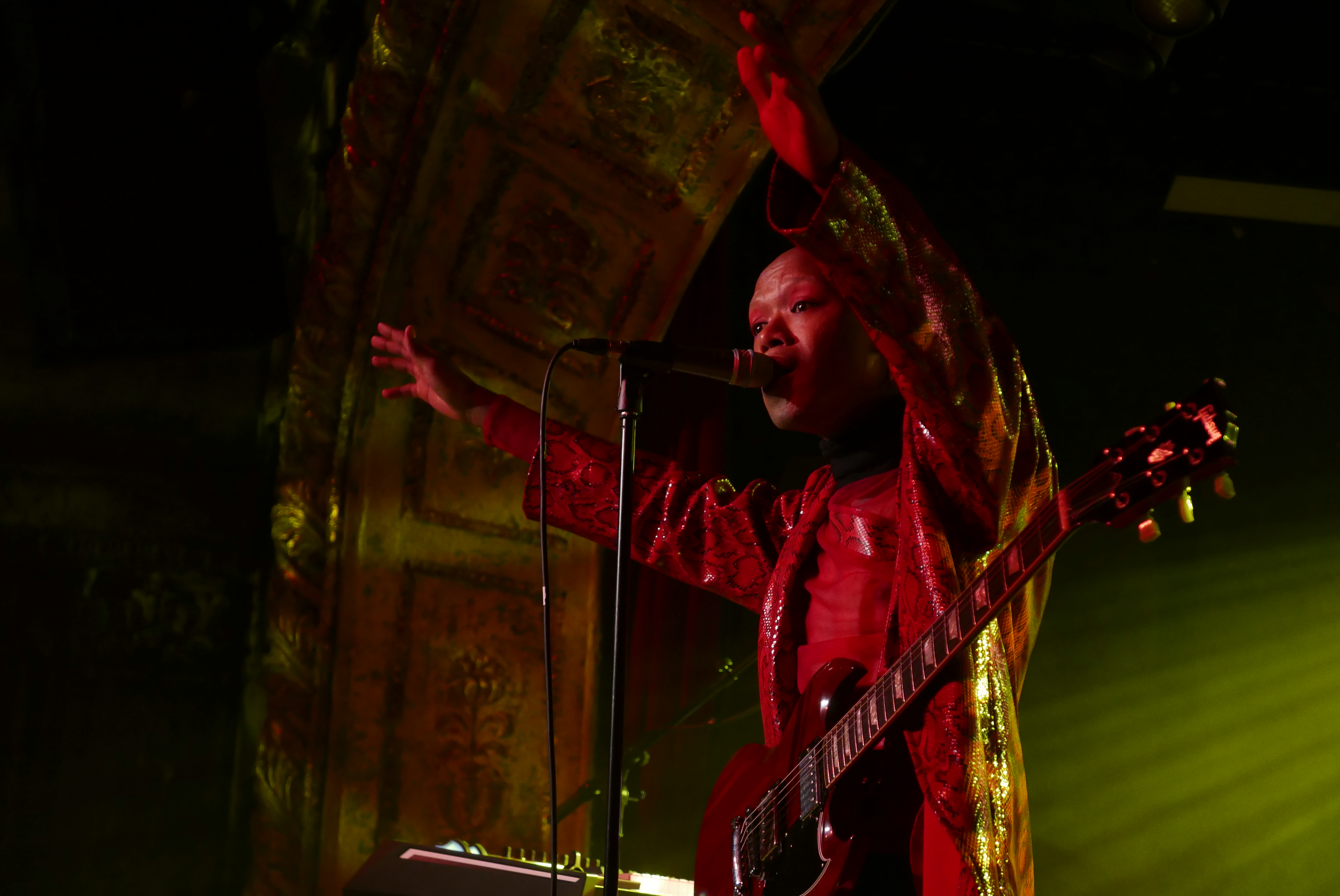
- Nakhane live at Omeara London 2018

Background information
- Born: Nakhane Lubabalo Mavuso; 3 February 1988 (age 38); Alice, Eastern Cape, South Africa
- Occupations: Singer; songwriter; actor; novelist
- Label: BMG
- Website: nakhaneofficial.com

Nakhane Mahlakahlaka (born Nakhane Lubabalo Mavuso, 3 February 1988) is a South African singer, songwriter, actor, and novelist. They were formerly known by the stage name Nakhane Touré. Having grown up in a Christian community in Port Elizabeth, they moved to Johannesburg at fifteen, leaving the church in 2013 and publicly celebrating their queerness with their debut album Brave Confusion. They found both controversy and critical acclaim with their starring role in John Trengove's 2017 feature film Inxeba (The Wound), and relocated to London, where they recorded and released a heavily autobiographical album You Will Not Die in 2018. Their work has been championed by Elton John, who interviewed Nakhane on his Beats 1 radio show, and Madonna, who cited them as one of her two favourite artists and said their music influenced her 2019 album Madame X.

Nakhane is non-binary and goes by they/them pronouns.

== Early life ==
Nakhane was born Nakhane Lubabalo Mavuso in Alice, a small rural town in South Africa's Eastern Cape. They were raised by their grandmother until they were five years old, and at the age of seven they were adopted by their aunt, who, they have said, was "to all intents and purposes" their mother, and her husband. They grew up in Port Elizabeth and attended a racially integrated school, where they learnt to speak English. A few years later they changed their surname to Mahlakahlaka, their aunt's, and, to affirm a more distinctive identity, dropped their commonplace middle name.

At the age of 15, they moved to Johannesburg. Having known they were gay for a few years, they came out to their friends and cousins at the age of 17. At 18 they began reading the work of James Baldwin, with whose black queer characters they strongly identified, and who became a substantial influence on Nakhane. Nakhane studied two degrees at college – film music composition and acting, and then literature, both of which they abandoned after a year. At 19, the mother of Nakhane's ex-girlfriend outed Nakhane to their aunt, who took them to prophets who encouraged them to renounce their homosexuality. Nakhane met a pastor's son, whereupon they became devoutly religious, joined a conservative Baptist Church, regularly attended bible studies, underwent gay conversion therapy, and preached against homosexuality.

Throughout five years of attempting to deny their homosexuality, during which time they would secretly visit gay clubs, they suffered guilt, fear and self-hatred. They began to doubt the existence of God, and at 25 had a breakdown, sleeping on sofas thanks to compassionate friends the church had told them to cut ties with. They extricated themselves from the church and became more black-conscious.

== Music career ==
=== Beginnings (1995–2007) ===
Nakhane knew they wanted to be an artist after singing at a Christmas carol concert at the age of seven. Their aunt was a classically trained opera singer and at home would play Handel, Mozart and Bach alongside Marvin Gaye and the O'Jays. At school Nakhane played piano, studied classical trombone, played in a wind band and a steel band, and sang in a choir. As a teenager they were inspired by George Michael's music and unapologetic queerness, and was later influenced by Radiohead, Leonard Cohen, and South African acts such as TKZee, Brenda Fassie, Hugh Maskela and Thandiswa Mazwai. They worked part-time in a music shop, musically educating themself via the CDs they brought home.

=== Acoustic-guitar music and Brave Confusion (2007–2014) ===
At 19, their aunt bought them an acoustic guitar and they began writing songs, performing in open-mic clubs and eventually getting signed, calling themself Nakhane Touré in tribute to Malian musician Ali Farka Touré and as an ode to pan-Africanism. Their debut album, the acoustic guitar-driven Brave Confusion, released on 29 July 2013, was influenced by Ali Farka Touré and West African music. Lyrically, it explored race, religion and sexuality. In 2014, Nakhane won the Best Alternative Album award at the South African Music Awards. Although they had left the church, that night their pastor telephoned to tell them they were excommunicated.

=== Electronic music and You Will Not Die (2015–present) ===
Disillusioned with the folk scene's perceived authenticity, Nakhane began to gravitate towards a more electronic sound. In 2015, they had a club hit, "We Dance Again", with house DJ Black Coffee, then began writing their second album. Nearing their 30s and looking for closure, they wanted to end their 20s "on a positive note instead of an angry and bitter note", the new songs inspired by their childhood, their family, and their leaving the church. With a new sense of freedom and self-ownership, they dropped their stage surname Touré, viewing You Will Not Die as a rebirth. The album title was taken from Proverbs 23:13, referring to child discipline: 'If you punish them with the rod, they will not die.'

They eschewed the acoustic guitar and wrote the album on piano, recording 98% of it with producer Ben Christophers at the latter's London studio; Nakhane settled in the city in February 2018. They wanted to work with electronic drums and synthesisers, and told Christophers they wanted the album to sound like the second side of David Bowie's Low, "but with the spirit of Nina Simone." It was released on 16 March 2018. Clash Music called it 'an incredibly beautiful document of self-acceptance, a soaring ode to self-worth, a blissful, remarkably assured piece of creativity.' Q magazine wrote that it was a 'remarkable' album, 'defiantly modern and unashamedly emotional.' A deluxe edition, featuring the Anohni collaboration "New Brighton", was released in North America on 22 February 2019. Pitchfork wrote that the album was 'an instant revelation on its own terms,' calling it 'strikingly intimate.' In May 2019 it won Best Alternative Album at the South African Music Awards.

In June 2019, to mark the 50th anniversary of the Stonewall Riots that had sparked the start of the modern LGBTQ rights movement, Queerty named them one of the Pride50 "trailblazing individuals who actively ensure society remains moving towards equality, acceptance and dignity for all queer people".

== Acting career ==
Following the release of Brave Confusion, film director John Trengove contacted Nakhane, asking them if they'd consider making the music for their 2017 film Inxeba (The Wound). After they met, Trengove asked them if they'd audition to play the lead role of factory worker Xolani in the film, which deals with ulwaluko – a Xhosa initiation into manhood involving circumcision, which Nakhane had undertaken aged 20.

Due to protests, intimidation and vandalism in response to the film in South Africa, many cinemas cancelled screenings. Having initially been classified as a 16LS, it was then reclassified as X18, a certification usually reserved for hardcore pornography. In response, on social media Nakhane wrote of homophobia, saying they refused 'to live in shame for your patriarchy to keep on living.' Following "an onslaught" of graphic death threats for their part in the film, they resolved to speak out in the media as much as possible. Despite media perception that they left South Africa because of the threats, they said that they moved to London in order to tour Europe less expensively, but admitted that 'times were not necessarily nice for me in South Africa,' and said the death threats made it hard to return to the Eastern Cape.

The film was selected as the South African entry for the Best Foreign Language Film at 2018's 90th Academy Awards, making the top-nine shortlist. Nakhane won awards for Best Actor at Durban International Film Festival, Palm Springs International Film Festival, South African Film And Television Awards, and Valencia International Film Festival Cinema Jove. The Hollywood Reporter called their performance 'an impressive screen debut.' The Playlist wrote that they were 'incredibly affecting as their quiet, secretive, lonely soul.'

After watching Inxeba (The Wound) and then listening to their music, John Cameron Mitchell cast Nakhane as Jairo, 'a young man who struggles with a host of demons', in 2019's Anthem: Homunculus podcast musical.

== Writing ==
In 2015, Nakhane's debut novel Piggy Boy's Blues was published, set in their hometowns of Alice and Port Elizabeth and portraying a Xhosa royal family. It was nominated for the Barry Ronge Fiction Prize and the Etisalat Prize for Fiction.

== Discography ==
=== Studio albums ===
- 2013: Brave Confusion
- 2017: You Will Not Die
- 2023: Bastard Jargon

== Filmography ==
- 2017: The Wound by John Trengove - as Xolani
- 2019: Anthem: Homunculus by John Cameron Mitchell - as Jairo (8 episodes, TV series)
- 2020: Two Eyes by Travis Fine - as Thandi
- 2021: Ear for Eye by Debbie Tucker Green - as US They
- 2024: Crave by Mark Middlewick - as David (short film)
