= Party Girl (TV series) =

- Genre: Sitcom
- Based on: Party Girl
- Developed by: Efrem Seeger
- Written by: Harry Birckmayer; Beth Fieger Falkenstein; Efrem Seeger; Susan Seeger; Daisy von Scherler Mayer; Eric Weinberg
- Directed by: Shelley Jensen; Michael Lembeck; Andrew D. Weyman; Steve Zuckerman
- Starring: Christine Taylor; Swoosie Kurtz
- Theme music composer: Carole Bayer Sager; Oliver Leiber
- Opening theme: "It's My Life"
- Composer: Claude Gaudette
- Country of origin: United States
- Original language: English
- No. of seasons: 1
- No. of episodes: 6

Production
- Executive producers: Harry Birckmayer; Efrem Seeger; Daisy von Scherler Mayer
- Producer: Jan Siegelman
- Editors: Rick Blue; William Murray
- Camera setup: Multi-camera
- Running time: 30 minutes
- Production companies: Subway Productions; Warner Bros. Television

Original release
- Network: Fox
- Release: September 9 – October 13, 1996

Party Girl is an American sitcom based on the 1995 film of the same name that aired briefly on Fox in September 1996 with Christine Taylor, Swoosie Kurtz, and John Cameron Mitchell. Following Fox's cancellation, boss Peter Roth attempted to retool the show, but it never materialized.

== Synopsis ==
Mary (Taylor) is ensconced in the clubs and parties of New York City. She is finally given a chance to prove herself thanks to Godmother Judy (Kurtz), who hires her to work in a library.

== Marketing and reception ==
Marketing of the series centered on Taylor's recent popularity portraying Marcia Brady in The Brady Bunch Movie. One television commercial featured a parody of the opening/closing credits of The Brady Bunch, but Taylor appeared (as Mary) in each box. Although six episodes were filmed, only four were aired and the show was quickly cancelled.

== Cast ==
- Christine Taylor as Mary
- Swoosie Kurtz as Judy Burkhard
- John Cameron Mitchell as Derrick
- Merrin Dungey as Wanda
- Matt Borlenghi as Oneal

== Episodes ==
No.	Title	Directed by	Written by	Original release date	Prod. code
1	"Pilot"	Michael Lembeck	Harry Birckmayer & Daisy von Scherler Mayer & Efrem Seeger	September 9, 1996	465450
2	"Virgin Mary"	Steve Zuckerman	Beth Fieger Falkenstein	September 16, 1996	465451
3	"Just Say No"	Steve Zuckerman	Eric Weinberg	September 23, 1996	465452
4	"A Charming Tale"	Shelley Jensen	Susan Seeger	September 30, 1996	465453
5	"Art History"	Unknown	Unknown	October 6, 1996	465455
6	"The Falafel Guy"	Unknown	Unknown	October 13, 1996	465454
