= Misplaced (film) =

1989 Polish film

Misplaced is a 1989 English-language Polish-American independent film directed by Louis Yansen. Elżbieta Czyżewska and John Cameron Mitchell play a Polish mother and her teenage son who immigrate to America for political reasons in 1981.

The film is the final onscreen performance of Debralee Scott who has two scenes as the vice principal of Jacek's school. Mark Patton has four scenes as Jacek's bully. Viveca Lindfors plays Jacek's grandmother.

== Cast ==
- Viveca Lindfors as Zofia
- John Cameron Mitchell as Jacek
- Elżbieta Czyżewska as Halina
- Kellie Overbey as Mary
- Tico Wells as Clayton
- Scott Schutzman Tiler as Eric
- Thor Fields as ruffian's friend
- Paul Klementowicz as Polish policeman
- Olek Krupa as Jacek's father
- Deirdre O'Connell as Ella
- Debralee Scott as vice principal
- Sullivan Walker
- Mark Patton as roughneck
