= Dunkaroos =

American cookie snack

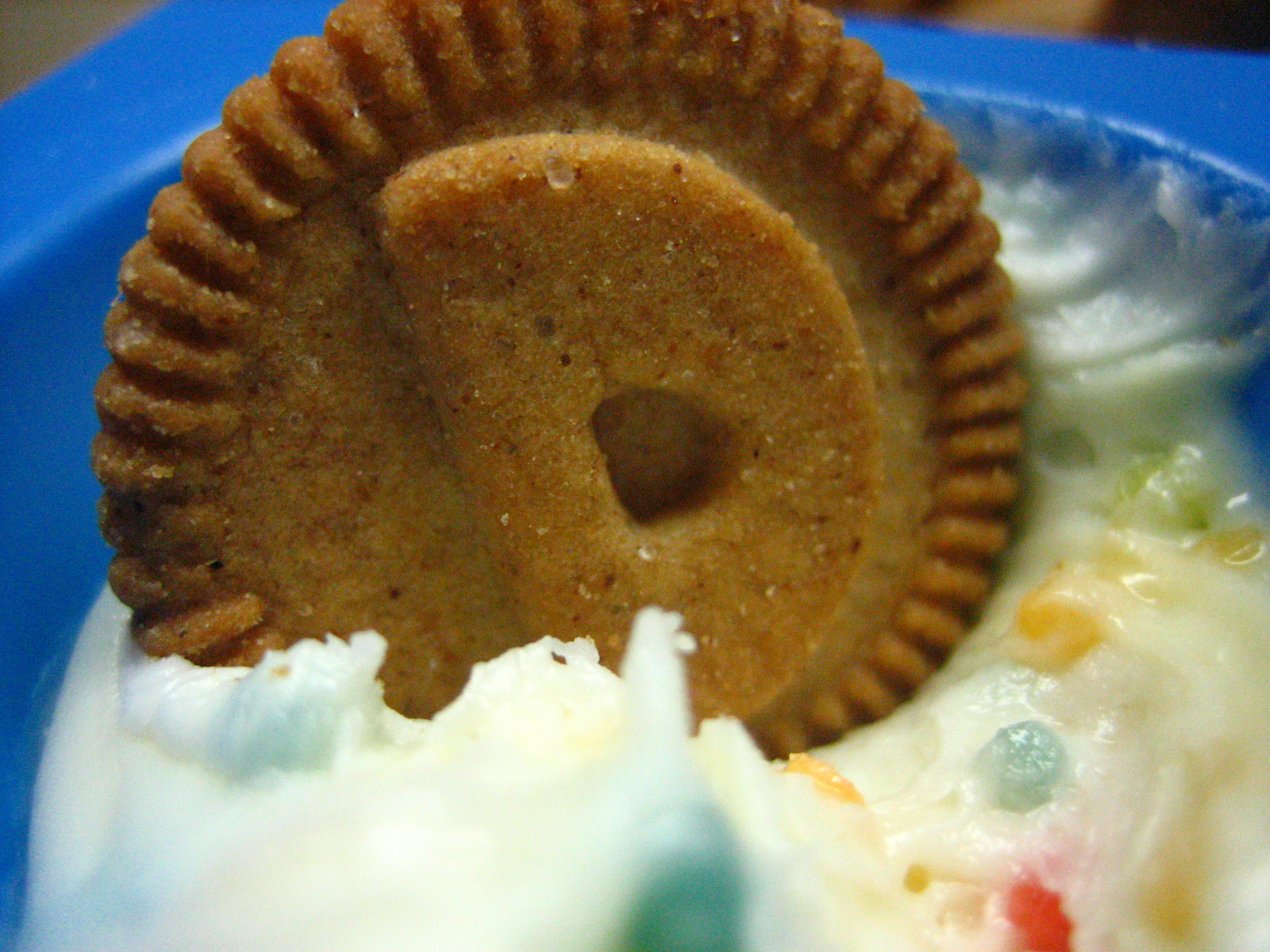
- Product type: Cookie snack
- Current owner: General Mills
- Country: United States
- Introduced: 1990 (first run); 2020 (second run)
- Discontinued: 2012 (original)
- Markets: United States (1990–2012, 2020–); Canada (1990–2017, 2020–); Australia (2019–)
- Website: www.dunkaroos.com

Dunkaroos are a brand of snack food manufactured by General Mills, first launched in 1990. It consists of a snack-sized package containing cookies and frosting; as the name implies, the cookies are meant to be dunked into the frosting before eating. Individual snack packages contain about ten small cookies and one cubic inch of frosting.

The cookies were made in a variety of shapes, including a circle with an uppercase "D" in the center (the only shape featured in the 2020 version), feet, the mascot in different poses, and a hot air balloon.

== Marketing ==
The Dunkaroos mascot is a cartoon kangaroo, explaining the product's name which is a portmanteau of dunk and kangaroos. The original mascot was Sydney, a caricature of modern Australian culture, who wore a hat, vest, and tie and spoke with an Australian accent, and was voiced by John Cameron Mitchell.

At the height of their popularity in 1996, a contest known as "Dunk-a-roos Kangaroo Kanga-Who Search" was held, resulting in the new mascot: Duncan, named the dunkin' daredevil.

== History ==
The product was discontinued in the United States in 2012, but continued to be sold in Canada. In 2016, General Mills announced a campaign called "Smugglaroos", which encouraged Canadians traveling to the United States to bring the snack to Americans who wanted it. Dunkaroos continued to be sold in Canada until General Mills suspended production there in 2017.

In December 2019, Dunkaroos were briefly brought back in Australia by Nestlé with a chocolate-hazelnut flavour and kangaroo-shaped biscuits. While General Mills owns the brand in North America, Nestlé produces the snack in Australia due to its acquisition of Uncle Tobys, which originally launched the product there. However, Nestlé Australia confirmed the line was discontinued again in 2020.

On February 3, 2020, a BuzzFeed article was published claiming that General Mills sent them exclusive info regarding a return of Dunkaroos. The official Twitter account for Dunkaroos claimed that they were scheduled to be re-released during the summer of 2020. It also used to link to the BuzzFeed article in the bio, but this was later changed to their official website.

In May 2020, Dunkaroos began arriving at 7-Eleven stores in the United States until being brought to other stores, including Walmart, Target, and Kroger, a few months afterwards. The new single serving package went from 1 oz to 1.5 oz, and the sugar was reduced significantly.

On July 22, 2020, limited edition merchandise based on the brand was released, with each order including a pack of the aforementioned snack..

In early 2021, a Dunkaroos cereal was released by General Mills as a limited-edition product. It featured small cookie pieces with rainbow sprinkles, similar in flavor to the brand's signature frosting. The cereal was discontinued in 2022 after its promotional run ended. Also around January 2021, Dunkaroos yogurt was released under Yoplait's Go-Gurt product line.

== Varieties ==
Dunkaroos have been sold in multiple cookie-and-frosting flavor combinations, including vanilla cookies with vanilla frosting and rainbow sprinkles, chocolate cookies with vanilla frosting, graham cookies with chocolate frosting, vanilla cookies with strawberry frosting, and chocolate chip graham cookies with rainbow sprinkle icing.

There was a special SpongeBob SquarePants edition in 2007, featuring yellow frosting and character-shaped cookies as part of a larger licensing deal between General Mills and Nickelodeon. The brand also collaborated with DreamWorks Animation in 2010 to release varieties based on films such as Megamind, Shrek Forever After, and Shark Tale.

On November 23, 2020, limited edition Dunkaroos cookie dough, complete with frosting, was released..

In 2022, Dunkaroos released a limited-edition Orange Sherbet Frosting variety, and introduced Chocolate Cookies with chocolate chip vanilla frosting.
