= Mark Behr =

Tanzanian-born writer (1963–2015)

Mark Behr (19 October 1963 – 27 November 2015) was a South African writer. He is best known for his three novels, The Smell of Apples (1995), Embrace (2000), and Kings of the Water (2009), but he also wrote many short stories and essays. He was a professor of English literature and creative writing at Rhodes College, Memphis, Tennessee, and also taught in the MA program at the University of the Witwatersrand in Johannesburg, South Africa.

== Early life and education ==
Mark Behr was born on 19 October 1963 into a family of farmers in the district of Oljorro, Arusha Region, Tanzania, then still Tanganyika. After the nationalisation of white-owned farms during the implementation of President Julius Nyerere's Ujamaa Policy of African Socialism in 1964, the family emigrated to South Africa. Here the family defined themselves as Afrikaners, with the Behr children attending Afrikaans language schools and the conservative Dutch Reformed church.

Behr's father became a game ranger in the game parks of KwaZulu-Natal, where Behr spent his early youth. Between ages ten and twelve, Behr attended the Drakensberg Boys' Choir School, a private music academy in the Drakensberg Mountains of KwaZulu-Natal. After matriculation from Port Natal High School, an Afrikaans language school in Durban, he was, like most other young white South African men of his age, conscripted into the South African Defence Force, and he served in the Angolan War, becoming a junior officer in the Marine Corps.

After leaving the South African Defence Force, Behr attended Stellenbosch University in the Western-Cape Province of South Africa. It was during this period (1985–1989) that Behr's creative work was first published; several poems appeared in the university's annual magazine, Die Stellenbosse Student. While a student there, Behr became an agent for the South African apartheid government, which was committed to monitoring the activities of students on university campuses to prevent political insurrection.

Having graduated with a Bachelor of Arts degree with majors in English and politics, Behr proceeded to read for an Honors degree in Politics. After a year with IDASA (the Institute for a Democratic Alternative for South Africa), Behr became a research fellow and lecturer at the International Peace Research Institute in Oslo, Norway, and began to travel between Europe, South Africa, and the United States. He enrolled at the University of Notre Dame in the United States, where he studied with Joseph Buttigieg, the translator of Antonio Gramsci's Prison Notebooks. Behr graduated from Notre Dame with master's degrees in International Peace Studies in 1993, Fiction Writing in 1998, and English Literature in 2000.

== Career ==
=== Writing ===
Behr's first published novel, The Smell of Apples (1995), appeared first in Afrikaans in 1993 (as Die Reuk van Appels). The book was well-received by critics, as well as being shortlisted for or winning several literary prizes. The attention attracted by the success of this book compelled Behr to speak publicly about his spying. In 1996, at a Cape Town conference on Truth and Reconciliation, he used his podium as keynote speaker to discuss his history in the South African military and his campus spy status.

In 2000, Behr's second novel, Embrace, was published. It had mixed reviews. Praised by Felice Picano in the Gay and Lesbian Review Worldwide for its epic quality, universal reach and insistence on complexity, it was reviled in The Sunday Times by Tim Trengrove Jones as a "baggy monster of overstated anxiety".

At the end of 2009 Behr published his third novel, Kings of the Water. Kate Saunders in The Times reviewed it as: "Superbly written, thoughtful and unflinching, this terrific novel explores the mentality of the Afrikaner male—with wonderfully poetic use of the Afrikaans language." Novelist Christopher Hope, reviewing for The Guardian (January 2010), noted the spirit of Chekhov's "The Cherry Orchard" and called the novel "one of the most moving to come out of South Africa in many years".

Behr also wrote short stories and essays. The short story "Die Boer en die Swaan" (The Boer and the Swan) appeared in Die Suid-Afrikaan, November 1993. "Cape Town, My Love" appeared in 2006 in Cape Town: A City Imagined, edited by Steven Watson (Penguin). Also in 2006, "Socrates, Miss Celie and Me" was published in Gesprek Sonder Grense: Johan Degenaar Word 80. In Spring 2007, the journal The Truth About the Fact published "People Like Us", which is an extract from a lecture Behr gave at Wilfrid Laurier University in Canada in 2003. During 2009 the short story "Boy" was published in the international anthology Between Men Two. This story is Behr's response to the short story "Girl" by Jamaica Kincaid. In Fifty Gay and Lesbian Books Everyone Must Read, Behr looks at the impact of Alice Walker's The Color Purple on his own political and psychological development.

==== Themes and influences ====
Behr's work is often concerned with issues of violence, racism, nationalism, militarisation, masculinity, and colonialism. Identity construction through the impact of language, nationalism, gender, and militarisation are consistent themes in his works. This is similar to other South African writers of his generation, like Damon Galgut and Marlene van Niekerk. Biographical experience and Behr's identification as gay/queer appear to have strongly influenced the content and nature of his work. He has written of the early influence of The Color Purple by Alice Walker. Traces of other influence may be found in the work of South African poets Breyten Breytenbach and Antjie Krog. Key theoretical influences in Behr's writing may come from selected texts of Antonio Gramsci, Judith Butler and Richard Rorty.

=== Academia ===
Behr was a professor of English literature and creative writing at Rhodes College, Memphis, Tennessee. He also taught in the MA program at the University of the Witwatersrand in Johannesburg, South Africa.

== Recognition and awards ==
Behr's work is extensively translated and has received awards from the Los Angeles Times, the United Kingdom British Society of Authors, and the Academy of Science of South Africa.

The Smell of Apples won the M-Net Award, one of South Africa's most prestigious literary prizes, as well as the Eugene Marais and the CNA Literary Award for Debut Novel in South Africa, and the Betty Trask Award for the best first novel published in the United Kingdom in 1996. The novel was also shortlisted for both the Steinbeck and Guardian Literary Awards. In 1997 the novel received the Art Seidenbaum Award from the Los Angeles Times.

Embrace was shortlisted for the 'Sunday Times Award Award in South Africa and the Encore Award in the United Kingdom.

== Film adaptation ==
The Smell of Apples has been made into a film of the same name, that had its world premiere at the 2026 Toronto International Film Festival on 11 September 2026. The screenplay was directed and co-written by John Trengove, with and Christopher Ciancimino.

== Personal life and death ==
Behr travelled regularly between the United States and South Africa.

Behr died on 27 November 2015 in Johannesburg after a suspected heart attack.

== Works ==
=== Novels ===
Mark Behr's three novels are:

- The Smell of Apples
- Embrace
- Kings of the Water
