= Camelot (musical) =

Stage musical

- Original Cast Recording cover
- Music: Frederick Loewe
- Lyrics: Alan Jay Lerner
- Book: Alan Jay Lerner (original book); Aaron Sorkin (revised book)
- Basis: The Once and Future King by T. H. White
- Premiere: October 1, 1960: O'Keefe Centre, Toronto, Ontario, Canada
- Productions: 1960 Broadway; 1963 U.S. tour 1964 West End; 1980 Broadway revival 1981 Broadway revival 1982 West End; 1984 Australian tour 1993 Broadway revival 2007 U.S. tour 2008 New York Philharmonic Concert; 2023 Broadway revival

Camelot is a musical with music by Frederick Loewe and lyrics and a book by Alan Jay Lerner. It is based on the legend of King Arthur as adapted from the 1958 novel The Once and Future King by T. H. White.

The original 1960 production, directed by Moss Hart with orchestrations by Robert Russell Bennett and Philip J. Lang, ran on Broadway for 873 performances, winning four Tony Awards. It starred Richard Burton as Arthur, Julie Andrews as Guenevere, and Robert Goulet as Lancelot.

It spawned several notable productions including four Broadway revivals and a 1967 film adaptation. The 2023 Broadway revival featured a revised book by Aaron Sorkin.

The musical has become associated with the Presidency of John F. Kennedy, which is sometimes called the "Camelot Era", because of an interview with Jackie Kennedy in which she compared her husband's presidency to King Arthur's reign, specifically mentioning his fondness for the musical and particularly the closing lyrics of the eponymous final song.

== Background ==
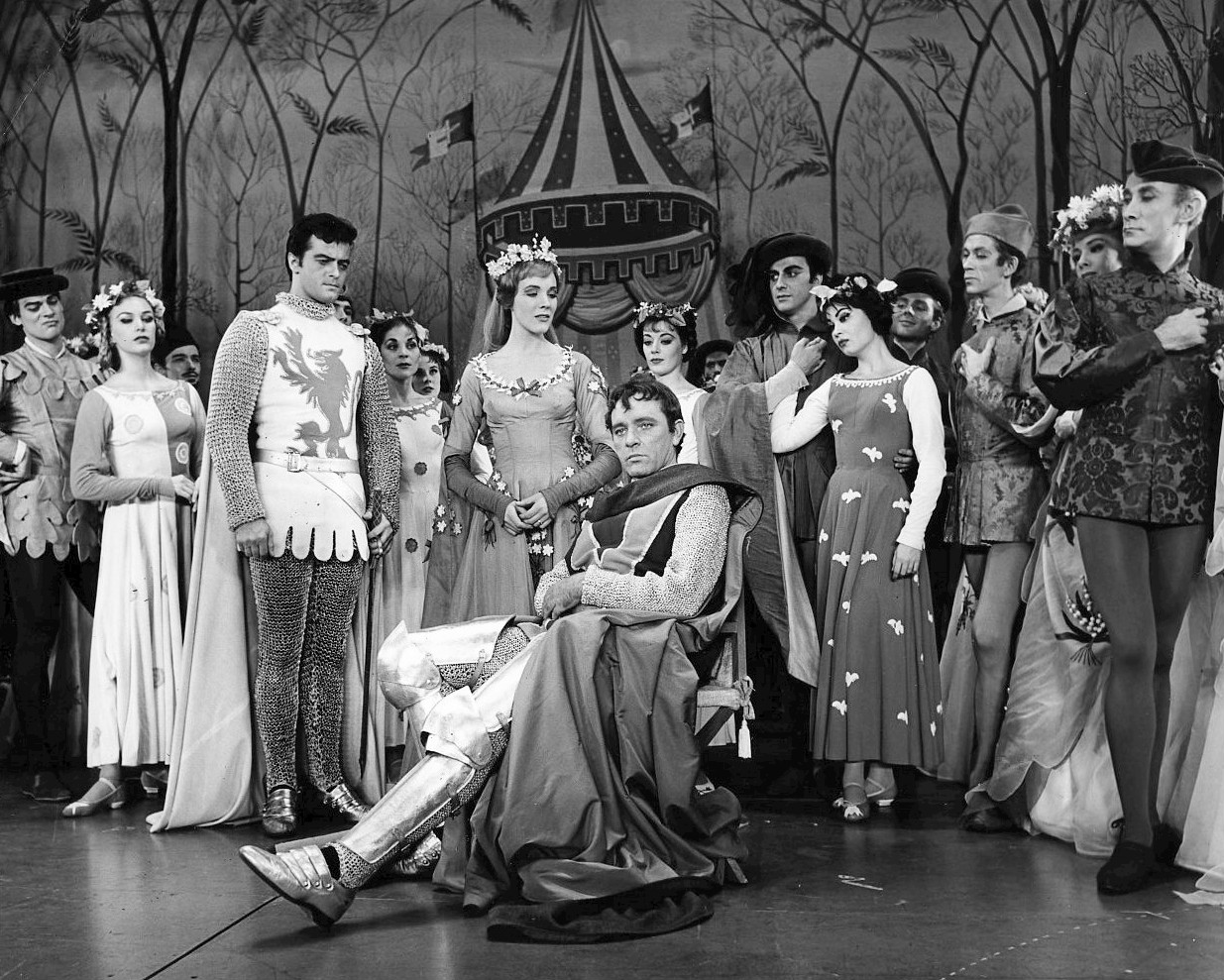
The original Broadway cast, including, foreground, from left, Robert Goulet, Julie Andrews, and Richard Burton.

In 1959, Alan Jay Lerner and Moss Hart decided to adapt T. H. White's The Once and Future King as their next project. As discussed in Lerner's 1978 book, The Street Where I Live, Frederick Loewe, who initially had no interest in the project, agreed to write music, with the understanding that if things went badly, it would be his last score. After the tremendous success of My Fair Lady, expectations were high for a new Lerner and Loewe musical. However, the show's production met several obstacles. Lerner's wife left him during the writing process, causing him to seek medical attention and delaying the production.

When Camelot began rehearsals, it still needed considerable work. However, the producers were able to secure a strong cast, including Julie Andrews, Richard Burton, and Roddy McDowall, as well as Robert Goulet in his first Broadway role. John Cullum also made his Broadway debut as Sir Dinadan; Bruce Yarnell was Sir Lionel. Cullum later replaced McDowall, and William Squire replaced Burton. Other replacements included Patricia Bredin (as of April 16, 1962), Kathryn Grayson (as of October 23, 1962) and Janet Pavek (as of July 9, 1962) for Andrews.

=== Tryouts and promotion ===
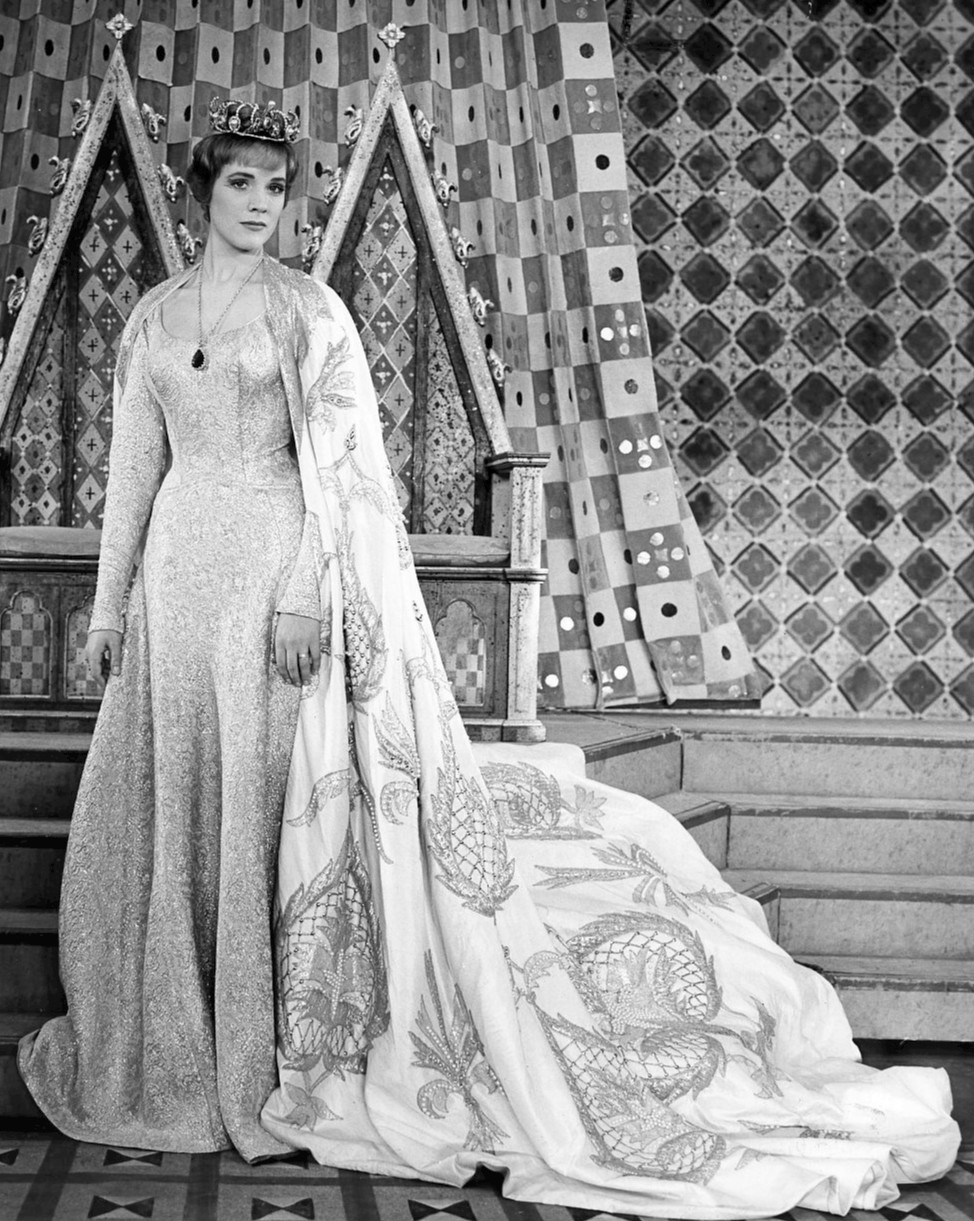
Julie Andrews as Queen Guenevere in the original 1960 Broadway production

The show premiered in Toronto, at the O'Keefe Centre on October 1, 1960. It overran drastically — it was supposed to last two hours forty minutes, and instead clocked in at four and a half hours. The curtain came down at twenty minutes to one in the morning; Lerner later noted that "Only Tristan and Isolde equaled it as a bladder endurance contest." Noël Coward is supposed to have remarked that the show was "longer than the Götterdämmerung ... and not nearly as funny!" In spite of this, the morning papers gave generally positive reviews, but hinted that the show needed much work, i.e., drastic editing, in order to succeed. Soon afterwards, Lerner was hospitalized for three weeks with a bleeding ulcer. Soon after he was discharged, Hart suffered his second heart attack, and Lerner stepped in as temporary director for the rest of the out-of-town run. Camelot then moved to Boston, edited, but still running well over the intended length. The production team tried to find another director, even phoning José Ferrer, who could not undertake the job. Lerner and Loewe disagreed on how to proceed with the show, as Loewe did not want to make any major changes without Hart's guidance. Lerner wrote: "God knows what would have happened had it not been for Richard Burton." Accepting cuts and changes, he radiated a "faith and geniality" and calmed the fears of the cast. Guenevere's song "Before I Gaze at You Again" was given to Andrews at the last minute before the first New York preview, which provoked her famous quote, "Of course, darling, but do try to get it to me the night before." After the show opened on Broadway, Hart was released from the hospital, and he and Lerner began cutting the play even further. Two songs, "Then You May Take Me To the Fair" and "Fie on Goodness," were cut a few months into the run (though they remain on the cast album, and the former featured in the 1967 film).

The New York critics' reviews of the original production were mixed. However, Ed Sullivan approached Lerner and Loewe to create a segment for his television variety program, celebrating the fifth anniversary of My Fair Lady. They decided to do very little from their previous hit and instead to perform four highlights from Camelot. The show stimulated ticket sales, and Camelot achieved an unprecedented advance sale of three and a half million dollars. Robert Goulet received favorable reviews, most notably for his rendition of the show-stopping romantic ballad "If Ever I Would Leave You", which became his signature song.

=== Aftermath ===
After Camelot's run, Goulet appeared on The Danny Thomas Show and The Ed Sullivan Show, which made him a household name among American audiences.

A week after the assassination of U.S. President John F. Kennedy in November 1963, Kennedy's widow, Jackie Kennedy, was interviewed by Theodore H. White, an interview that ran in the December 1963 issue of Life magazine. In the interview, Jackie stated that the show's original cast recording had been a favorite bedtime listening for her husband (who had been Lerner's classmate at Harvard University), and that his favorite lines were in the final number: "Don't let it be forgot/ That once there was a spot/ For one brief, shining moment/ That was known as Camelot". She also made a direct comparison to the Camelot storyline, saying, "There'll be great presidents again... but there'll never be another Camelot."

The veracity of her claim about her husband's love of Camelot has been disputed. Nevertheless, an association between Camelot and Kennedy's tenure as president formed immediately in the public consciousness, and has remained in the decades since. Lerner later wrote in his autobiography that, soon after the article came out, a touring production of the show at the Civic Opera House in Chicago had to be stopped after those lines were sung: "there was a sudden wail from the audience. It was not a muffled sob; it was a loud, almost primitive cry of pain. The play stopped, and for almost five minutes everyone in the theater - on the stage, in the wings, in the pit, and in the audience - wept without restraint. Then the play continued..."

The obstacles encountered in producing Camelot were hard on the creative partnership of Lerner and Loewe, and the show turned out to be one of their last collaborations (although they did work together to adapt their 1958 movie Gigi to the stage in 1973, and collaborated again the following year on the movie musical The Little Prince). Camelot was Hart's last Broadway show. He died of a heart attack in Palm Springs, California, on December 20, 1961.

== Synopsis ==
In the 1981 revision of the stage musical, the action starts at the end of the plot as Arthur is about to fight Mordred. Arthur asks that Merlin take his memory back to the beginning and the rest of the musical is told in flashback from this frame story. This was a device adopted from the 1967 film adaptation. The 1981 revision also changes the sequence of some scenes especially in Act II. What follows is a synopsis of the original 1960 version.

=== Act I ===
King Arthur is nervous about his upcoming arranged marriage and is hiding in a tree. Merlin the Magician, his wise tutor, calls Arthur down to warn the young king that he must learn to think for himself. Merlin, who lives backward in time and remembers the future as well as the past, knows he will soon be separated from Arthur. Merlin persuades Arthur to climb down and chides him for his unkingly behavior. Arthur then left alone, ponders both his subjects and his own feelings about the intended nuptials (“I Wonder What the King is Doing Tonight?”). Arthur hears someone coming and scampers up the tree again. Guenevere, Arthur's intended bride, comes to the woods. She does not like the idea of being Queen, preferring to live the life of an ordinary nobleman's daughter (“Simple Joys of Maidenhood”). She stumbles into Arthur, who initially calls himself “Wart” (his childhood nickname), and then, hearing of her reluctance to marry, tells her of the joys of life in Camelot (“Camelot”). It is love at first sight, and they almost kiss but are interrupted when Arthur's attendants come upon the two of them. He is revealed as the King. He tells Guenevere the story of how he pulled the sword from the stone and became king, and she finally agrees to marry him. The wizard Merlin is amused by this development, but his joy turns to sorrow as his memories of the future begin to fade. Merlin realizes that Nimue, a beautiful water nymph, has come to draw him into her cave for eternal sleep (“Follow Me”). He begs Nimue for answers, as he has forgotten if he has warned Arthur about two important individuals, Lancelot and Mordred. His memories fade permanently, though, and he is led away.

Five years later, Arthur sits with Guenevere in his study, discussing his views on knights and chivalry. He explains that he wishes to create a new kind of knight — one that does not pillage and fight but tries to uphold honor and justice. He is eventually inspired, with Guenevere's help, to establish the Round Table with the motto “might for right.” Within a few years, Arthur's idea leads to the Knights of the Round Table being renowned all over England, and their fame even spreads to France. A young, pretentious and over-religious French prince from Joyous Garde named Lancelot du Lac has heard of the Round Table and is determined to come to Camelot and join Arthur's knights, confident that he is perfect for the post (“C’est Moi”). King Pellinore, an elderly man who was a friend of Arthur's family, also comes to Camelot to witness Arthur's greatness for himself. He inadvertently wanders into the May Day festivities organized by Guenevere (“The Lusty Month of May”). On learning who he is, Guenevere orders a guestroom to be prepared, and has one of the knights escort him to the castle. Pellinore becomes part of the family — he is still present at the musical's conclusion, many years later. As Pellinore departs, King Arthur arrives with Lancelot, and introduces him to the company. Guenevere is put off by Lancelot's boastful manner and her attempts to draw him into conversation seem only intended to prove him wrong about his apparently unrealistic claims about his own prowess. The knights and ladies of the court watch in amusement. Guenevere incites three of the knights — Sir Dinadan, Sir Sagramore, and the burly Sir Lionel — to challenge Lancelot to a joust (“Then You May Take Me to the Fair”). Arthur (who, unlike everybody else, is friendly with Lancelot) is dismayed by this, and is at a loss to understand a woman's ways — though he cannot be angry with Guenevere (“How to Handle a Woman”).

In the jousting match, Lancelot easily defeats all three knights. He wounds Sir Lionel, who fights him last, so badly that the crowd thinks he is dead. But the dismay of the crowd turns to awe as Lancelot's distraught cries for Sir Lionel to live seem to resurrect a dead man. Whether it is an actual miracle or not, the entire court believes it to be one, and all the knights and ladies bow or curtsy to Lancelot, paying homage to him as he passes by. Guenevere curtsies to him, too, and as he kneels before her, their eyes lock, and both seem to realize something that neither understood before. Arthur notices their silent exchange. In the scenes that follow, Guenevere is torn between her new love for Lancelot and her love and loyalty for Arthur. She wishes Lancelot would leave Camelot (“Before I Gaze at You Again”). In spite of Lancelot's boasts that he is immune to pleasures of the flesh, he is also madly in love with Guenevere and also torn by the conflict between that love and his devotion to Arthur, who makes Lancelot a Knight of the Round Table. Arthur, realizing that Lancelot and Guenevere have feelings for each other, hopes it will blow over and soliloquizes to his sword Excalibur that they will rise to the challenges they will all face together.

=== Act II ===
Many years later, Guenevere and Lancelot are still tormented by their unfulfilled love. She implores him to discontinue the romance, but Lancelot will not leave her (“If Ever I Would Leave You”). They both believe that Arthur is not aware of it. Nevertheless, she remains faithful to Arthur and helps him in carrying out the affairs of State.

Mordred, Arthur's illegitimate son, comes to Camelot to dishonor the King and tries to gain the throne for himself. Arthur puts him in charge of the knights’ training program, not knowing that Mordred is there to destroy the Round Table in revenge against Arthur for abandoning him, and that he detests the idea of being a Knight (“The Seven Deadly Virtues”). Arthur begins to feel the strain of ruling England, and both he and Guenevere wonder what commoners do without any such responsibilities (“What Do The Simple Folk Do?”).

Mordred, meanwhile, has devised a plan to ruin Arthur and his kingdom permanently. He enters an enchanted glade where his aunt, the sorceress Morgan le Fay, dwells in an invisible castle. Morgan has a sweet tooth, and though she likes Arthur, Mordred manages to bribe her with a large supply of sweetmeats to build one of her invisible walls around Arthur for one night, so that when he goes on his hunting trip the next day, he will not be able to get back to the castle (“The Persuasion”). Meanwhile, Mordred incites the Knights to remember their former days of fighting and pillaging and turns them against Arthur (“Fie On Goodness!”).

With Arthur gone, Lancelot, unable to stop himself, visits Guenevere in her chambers, as Mordred fully suspected he would. They kiss passionately (“I Loved You Once in Silence”). However, Lancelot and Guenevere's affair and Mordred's machinations come to a head when Mordred and some of the Knights of the Round Table interrupt, accuse Lancelot of treason, and try to take him prisoner. Lancelot fights them off and escapes, but Guenevere is arrested, tried, found guilty of treason by reason of her infidelity, and sentenced to be burned at the stake (“Guenevere”). At the execution, Arthur watches from a distance as Mordred taunts him for his failures; he is torn between upholding his law and doing his duty as a king, or sparing Guenevere, whom he still loves in spite of everything. At the last moment, Lancelot arrives with an army, rescues Guenevere and takes her off with him to France. But in the process, Lancelot has been forced to kill some of the other knights, leaving the survivors vowing revenge.

For the sake of his own honor and that of Camelot, Arthur must now wage war against Lancelot. Mordred has taken up his own army against Arthur, back in England. The war takes a terrible toll on Camelot, as more than half of the Knights of the Round Table are killed. Before the final battle, Arthur meets Lancelot and Guenevere. Lancelot and Guenevere's relationship has foundered, doubtless because of their guilty consciences. Guenevere has become a nun, and the Round Table is now broken. They offer to face up to justice in England, but Arthur will not see Guenevere burned or Lancelot beheaded. He forgives them both, and they depart separately. That night in camp, Arthur meets a young stowaway named Tom of Warwick (likely Sir Thomas Malory), who has come to join the Round Table. His speech reminds Arthur of the idealism and hope that he had as a young king, and inspires him. Arthur knights Tom and sends him back to England to grow up there, that he might pass on to future generations the ideals of chivalry and Camelot ("Camelot" (reprise)).

=== Revisions to the 2023 Broadway revival ===
The Aaron Sorkin-penned revision of the book excises all magic, makes Merlin a sage, and Morgan le Fay a scientist heralding the Age of Enlightenment as well as Mordred's mother and Arthur's ex-partner, and removes the character of Nimue. The new book also underscores democracy and a more egalitarian society. Act I begins with Arthur’s retinue alert, waiting for the arrival of Guenevere's carriage from France as part of a peace treaty, and critiquing her flouting of tradition by disembarking at the bottom of the hill instead of atop. Guenevere is more contemporary and is cold to Arthur in their meeting, replacing their love-at-first-sight encounter. She seems bound by duty in/to her marriage, rather than love, and serves as an advisor to Arthur rather than a mere consort. Despite this, near the conclusion of Act II, a tearful Guenevere admits to Arthur that she has loved him since their first meeting and wishes he could see himself the way she has.

The knights are mistrustful of Guenevere because she is a French foreigner. Pellinore is an older knight who takes on Merlin’s role of sage/advisor. Arthur steps in as the final jouster and is the one revived by Lancelot. It is revealed that Arthur has written Morgan le Fay a letter every week for the past four years, despite never receiving a reply, begging her and Mordred to live in the castle. This long-standing faithfulness stirs Guenevere’s jealousy and fear when Arthur pays le Fay a visit as a result of a forged letter from Mordred. Lancelot, torn between his duty to Arthur and the Knights and his forbidden love of Guenevere, agrees to guard her one final night before returning to France when Arthur pays le Fay a visit.

== Productions and adaptations ==
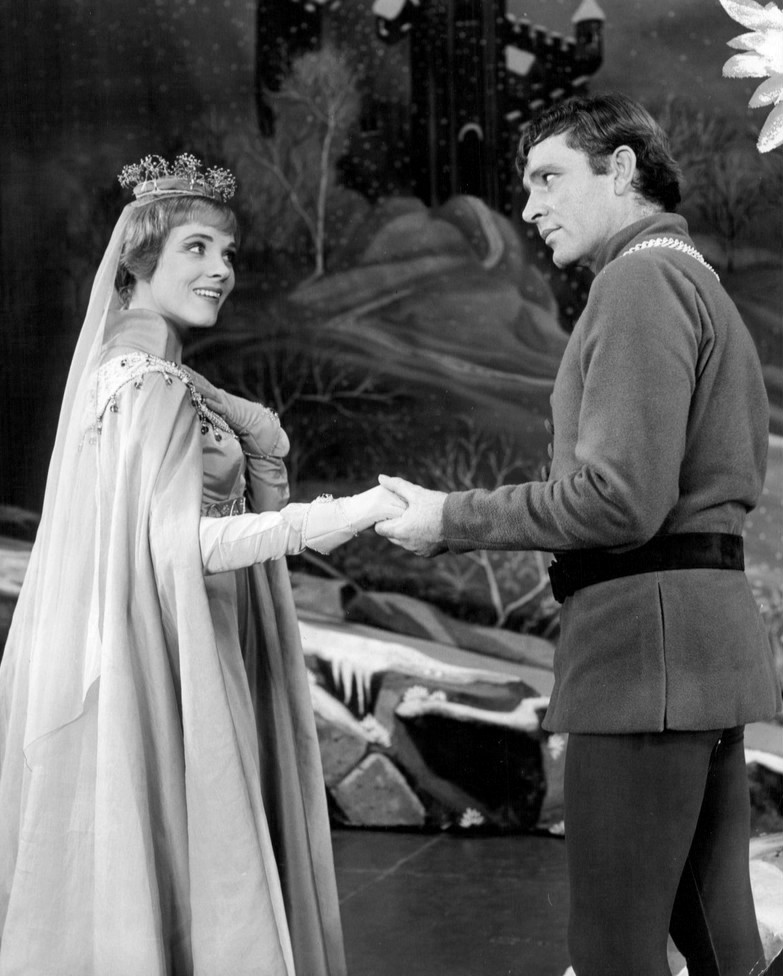
Julie Andrews and Richard Burton as Queen Guenevere and King Arthur

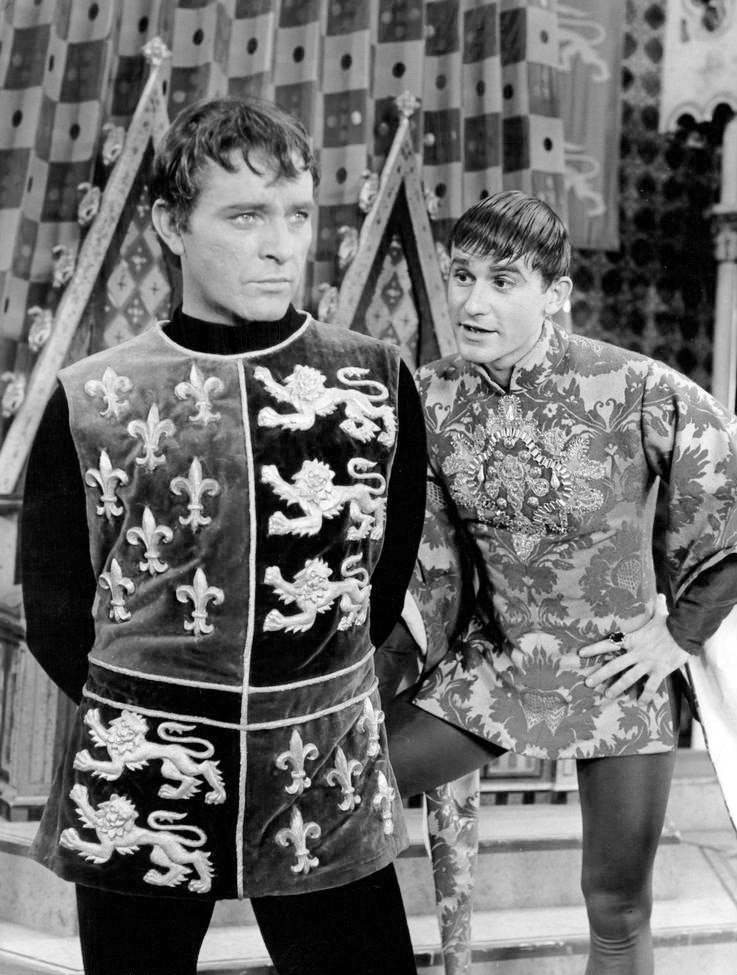
Burton as Arthur and Roddy McDowall as Mordred

=== Original production and tours ===
Camelot opened on Broadway at the Majestic Theatre on December 3, 1960, and closed on January 5, 1963, after 873 performances and 2 previews. Directed by Moss Hart, the choreography was by Hanya Holm, scenic design by Oliver Smith, costume design by Adrian (who worked on the designs prior to his death in September 1959) and Tony Duquette, and lighting design by Abe Feder. It won four Tony Awards. The original cast album was America's top-selling mono LP record for 6 weeks.

A two-year U.S. tour followed the Broadway closing, starring Kathryn Grayson and William Squire, who was succeeded by Louis Hayward. Grayson was dismissed in Cincinnati, OH, for having missed performances and replaced by her understudy, Jan Moody. There was also a 1963–1964 bus-and-truck tour starring Biff McGuire as Arthur, Jeannie Carson as Guenevere, and Sean Garrison as Lancelot. Yet another company toured with the show in 1964, starring Howard Keel as Arthur, Constance Towers as Guenevere, and Bob Holiday as Lancelot. Also in 1964 an Australian production opened at Her Majesty's Theatre, Melbourne, starring Paul Daneman and Jacqueline McKeever, with stage design by John Truscott. Truscott would later work on the film adaptation. The production, by the J. C. Williamson company, ran for two years.

=== Original and revived West End productions ===
The London production opened in August 1964 at the Theatre Royal, Drury Lane, and featured Laurence Harvey as Arthur, Elizabeth Larner as Guenevere and Barry Kent as Lancelot. It played for 518 performances.

Richard Harris again played Arthur in a West End revival at the Apollo Victoria Theatre, London, from November 23, 1982 to February 5, 1983 with Fiona Fullerton, William Squire and Robert Meadmore.

=== Broadway revivals ===
The show was revived on Broadway at the Winter Garden Theatre from November 15, 1981, to January 2, 1982, and was broadcast on HBO a year later, starring Richard Harris as Arthur, Meg Bussert as Guenevere, Muenz as Lancelot and Thor Fields as Tom of Warwick. Harris, who had starred in the film, and Muenz also took the show on tour nationwide. The book for this version was slightly revised, including the addition of a frame story in which the show opens with an older Arthur looking back on his life, a device taken from the 1967 film version. Scenes had their sequence changed, mainly in Act II.

Richard Burton reprised his role as Arthur in a revival that ran from July 8, 1980, to August 23, 1980, at the New York State Theater at Lincoln Center for the Performing Arts. Christine Ebersole played Guenevere, and Richard Muenz was Lancelot.

Another Broadway revival ran from June 21, 1993 to August 7, 1993 for 56 performances at the Gershwin Theatre as a stop on a national tour, with Robert Goulet now cast in the role of Arthur. Goulet reprised this role at Toronto's O'Keefe Centre in 1993.

In March 2022, it was reported that Aaron Sorkin and Bartlett Sher were working on a reimagined production for Broadway, which was to begin performances on Thursday, November 3 and open on Thursday, December 8 at the Vivian Beaumont Theater. In June 2022, it was announced that the revival had been postponed to the spring of 2023. It began previews on March 9, 2023, with an official opening on Thursday, April 13, 2023. Cast members included Andrew Burnap as Arthur, Phillipa Soo as Guenevere, and Jordan Donica as Lancelot. A cast recording was released on June 2nd, 2023. The show was nominated for five Tonys, but won none, and reviews were mixed. The production closed on July 23, 2023, after 38 previews and 115 regular performances. Plans for a U.S. national tour and West End production were announced, but later cancelled.

=== Other productions ===
- David Carradine played Arthur in a 1967 production for the Dallas (TX) Summer Musicals. He was joined by Gaylea Byrne as Guenevere, Nolan Van Way as Lancelot, Alan Johnson as Mordred, Roderick Cook as Pellinore, and William LeMassena as Merlyn and Sagramore. The production ran August 7–20 at DSM's iconic 1925 Music Hall at Fair Park.
- Richard Harris again played Arthur in a West End revival at the Apollo Victoria Theatre, London, from November 23, 1982 to February 5, 1983 with Fiona Fullerton, William Squire and Robert Meadmore.
- An 18-month U.S. tour, starring Michael York as Arthur, Rachel York (no relation) as Guenevere, and James Barbour as Lancelot, began on January 9, 2007 and ended in April 2008. Alan Jay Lerner's son, Michael Lerner, contributed changes to the libretto, and Glenn Casale directed. From June 27–30, 2007, the tour played at Toronto's Hummingbird Centre, where the musical had premiered in 1960. While the 2007 Michael York tour was performing across the U.S., Candlewood International ran a separate, largely non-equity national tour that played to cities not visited by the union tour. The Morgan le Fay character was removed, as it had been in all previous productions since 1964. Jeff Buchsbaum directed and Paula Sloan choreographed a cast headed by Robert Brown as Arthur, Matthew Posner as Lancelot, Mollie Vogt-Welch as Guenevere, Gregory Van Acker as Sir Sagramore, Geoff Lutz as Mordred, and Heather Faith Stricker as Lady Catherine.
- From May 7 to May 10, 2008, the New York Philharmonic presented five semi-staged concerts of Camelot directed by Lonny Price and produced by Thomas Z. Shepard and starring Gabriel Byrne as King Arthur, Marin Mazzie as Guenevere, and Nathan Gunn as Lancelot. It featured Christopher Lloyd as Pellinore, Stacy Keach as Merlyn, Marc Kudisch as Lionel, Bobby Steggert as Mordred, Will Swenson as Sagramore, Christopher Sieber as Dinadan, Fran Drescher as Morgan le Fay and Rishi Mutalik as Tom of Warwick. The May 8 performance was broadcast nationally on Live from Lincoln Center on PBS.
- Camelot was produced in San Francisco at San Francisco Playhouse in July 2013.
- In May 2014, there was a concert at the John F. Kennedy Center for the Performing Arts starring Brian Stokes Mitchell as King Arthur, Laura Michelle Kelly as Guenevere and Josh Grisetti as Mordred.
- The 2018 production at Sidney Harman Hall set box office records for the Shakespeare Theatre Company in Washington, DC.
- In March 2019, there was a Lincoln Center Theater gala production of Camelot starring Lin-Manuel Miranda as Arthur, Solea Pfeiffer as Guenevere, Jordan Donica as Lancelot, Ethan Slater as Mordred, Danny Burstein as Pellinore, Dakin Matthews as Merlyn, and Ruthie Ann Miles as Nimue.
- A semi-staged concert performance of the musical ran at the Watermill Theatre, Newbury from 17 August to the 5th of September 2020. Due to the COVID-19 pandemic, the concerts were held outdoors in the theatre's gardens and the audience were seated at socially distanced tables. It was directed by The Watermill Theatre's Artistic Director Paul Hart. The cast included real life married couple Michael Jibson & Caroline Sheen as Arthur and Guenevere, Marc Antolin as Lancelot and Peter Dukes as Mordred.
- There have been 2 concerts at the West End London Palladium venue. The first was in October 2018, starring David Thaxton as Arthur, Savannah Stevenson as Guenevere, Charles Rice as Lancelot, and Clive Carter as Merlyn and King Pellinore. The second was in February 2022 starring Ramin Karimloo as Arthur, Bradley Jaden as Lancelot, and Lucy St. Louis as Guenevere.

== Notable casts ==
=== Original casts ===
Character	Broadway	West End	First Broadway Revival / National Tour	Second Broadway Revival	Second London Revival	Third Broadway Revival	Fourth Broadway Revival
Character	1960	1964	1980	1981	1982	1993	2023
King Arthur	Richard Burton	Laurence Harvey	Richard Burton	Richard Harris	Richard Harris	Robert Goulet	Andrew Burnap
Guenevere	Julie Andrews	Elizabeth Larner	Christine Ebersole	Meg Bussert	Fiona Fullerton	Patricia Kies	Phillipa Soo
Sir Lancelot Du Lac	Robert Goulet	Barry Kent	Richard Muenz	Richard Muenz	Robert Meadmore	Steve Blanchard	Jordan Donica
Merlyn	David Hurst	Miles Malleson	James Valentine	James Valentine	William Squire	James Valentine	Dakin Matthews
King Pellinore	Robert Coote	Cardew Robinson	Paxton Whitehead	Barrie Ingham	Robin Bailey	James Valentine	Dakin Matthews
Mordred	Roddy McDowall	Nicky Henson	Robert Fox	Richard Backus	Michael Howe	Kenneth Boys followed by Tucker McCrady	Taylor Trensch
Morgan Le Fay	M'el Dowd	Moyra Fraser	—N/a	—N/a	—N/a	—N/a	Marilee Talkington
Tom of Warwick	Robin Stewart	Kit Williams	Thor Fields	Thor Fields	Darren Rheault	Chris Van Strander	Camden McKinnon
Sir Dinadan	John Cullum	Victor Flattery	William Parry	William Parry	Roger Nott	Richard Smith	Anthony Michael Lopez
Sir Sagramore	James Gannon	Brian Hewitt Jones	Andy McAvin	Andy McAvin	Neil Michael	Cedric D. Cannon	Fergie L. Philippe
Sir Lionel	Bruce Yarnell	Raymond Edwards	William James	William James	David Mexon	Virl Andrick	Danny Wolohan

== Musical numbers ==
Act I

- "Overture" — Orchestra
- "The March [Parade]" — Orchestra
- "I Wonder What the King Is Doing Tonight" — Arthur
- "The Simple Joys of Maidenhood" — Guenevere
- "Camelot" — Arthur
- "Camelot" (reprise) — Arthur, Guenevere
- "Follow Me"† — Nimue
- "C'est Moi" — Lancelot
- "The Lusty Month of May" — Guenevere, Ensemble
- "Then You May Take Me to the Fair"§ — Guenevere, Sir Lionel, Sir Sagramore, Sir Dinaden
- "How To Handle a Woman" — Arthur
- "The Jousts"† — Arthur, Guenevere, Ensemble
- "Before I Gaze at You Again" — Guenevere

Act II

- "If Ever I Would Leave You" — Lancelot
- "The Seven Deadly Virtues" — Mordred
- "What Do the Simple Folk Do?" — Arthur and Guenevere
- "Fie on Goodness!"§ — Mordred & Knights
- "I Loved You Once In Silence"‡ — Guenevere
- "Guenevere" — Ensemble
- "Camelot" (reprise) — King Arthur

§ — Cut shortly into the original 1960 run, remained on the cast album; restored in most subsequent revivals; "Fie on Goodness" cut from film version; "Then You May Take Me to the Fair" included in film.

† — Cut from the 2022 Broadway revival

‡ — Reassigned to Lancelot in the 2022 Broadway revival

== Critical response ==
The New York critics' reviews of the original production were mixed to positive. A 1993 review in The New York Times commented that the musical "has grown in stature over the years, primarily because of its superb score ... [which] combined a lyrical simplicity with a lush romanticism, beautifully captured in numbers like 'I Loved You Once in Silence' and 'If Ever I Would Leave You.' These ballads sung by Guenevere and Lancelot are among the most memorable in the Lerner-Loewe catalogue. King Arthur supplies the wit, with songs like 'I Wonder What the King Is Doing Tonight.'" A 2003 review noted, "this musically rich, legend-based classic evokes enough swashbuckling spectacle to keep one smiling. And for lovers of dime-store romance, Camelot has it all — a beautiful English princess swept off her feet by a shy, but passionate bachelor king; an ardent French knight, torn between devotion to his liege and an uncontrollable hunger, reciprocated, to be sure, for the king's tempestuous wife.... Camelot features a score rich in English country-tune charm by Mr. Lerner. [sic: Loewe wrote the music] Its lyrics, by Mr. Loewe [sic: Lerner wrote the lyrics], never fail to dazzle with their virtuosity and wit." However, "Jay Lerner's murky book... has helped sink many a revival of the musical.... It's a good story, but Lerner's book is talky and dense, filled with pontificating soliloquies that would have been more powerfully contained in song. Moreover, while the entire show rushes towards a bloody climax... when it finally arrives, it is merely sketched upon in one song, 'Guenevere.' ...The score, though, is pure magic."

== Awards and nominations ==
=== Original Broadway production ===
Year	Award	Category	Nominee	Result
1961	Tony Award			
1961	Tony Award	Best Performance by a Leading Actor in a Musical	Richard Burton	Won
1961	Tony Award	Best Performance by a Leading Actress in a Musical	Julie Andrews	Nominated
1961	Tony Award	Best Conductor and Musical Director	Franz Allers	Won
1961	Tony Award	Best Scenic Design in a Musical	Oliver Smith	Won
1961	Tony Award	Best Costume Design in a Musical	Adrian and Tony Duquette	Won
1961	Outer Critics Circle Award	Best Set Design	Oliver Smith	Won
1961	Theatre World Award		Robert Goulet	Won
1961	Grammy Award	Best Musical Theater Album		Nominated

=== 1980 Broadway revival ===
Source: IBDB

Year	Award	Category	Nominee	Result
1981	Tony Award	Best Revival		Nominated
1981	Tony Award	Best Performance by a Featured Actor in a Musical	Paxton Whitehead	Nominated
1981	Drama Desk Award	Outstanding Featured Actor in a Musical	Paxton Whitehead	Nominated

=== 2023 Broadway revival ===
Year	Award	Category	Nominee	Result
2023	Tony Awards	Best Revival of a Musical		Nominated
2023	Tony Awards	Best Featured Actor in a Musical	Jordan Donica	Nominated
2023	Tony Awards	Best Scenic Design of a Musical	Michael Yeargan & 59 Productions	Nominated
2023	Tony Awards	Best Costume Design of a Musical	Jennifer Moeller	Nominated
2023	Tony Awards	Best Lighting Design of a Musical	Lap Chi Chu	Nominated
2023	Drama Desk Award	Outstanding Lead Performance in a Musical	Andrew Burnap	Nominated
2023	Drama Desk Award	Outstanding Scenic Design of a Musical	Michael Yeargan	Nominated
2023	Drama Desk Award	Outstanding Costume Design of a Musical	Jennifer Moeller	Nominated
2023	Drama Desk Award	Outstanding Fight Choreography	B.H. Barry	Won
2023	Outer Critics Circle Award	Special Achievement Award	B.H. Barry	Won
2023	Drama League Award	Outstanding Revival of a Musical		Nominated
2023	Drama League Award	Distinguished Performance	Phillipa Soo	Nominated
2023	Drama League Award	Outstanding Direction of a Musical	Bartlett Sher	Nominated

== Original cast recording ==
Year	Chart	Peak position
1961	U.S. Top Monaural LPs (Billboard)	1
1968	Norwegian Albums (VG-lista)	20

Preceded by G.I. Blues by Elvis Presley	Billboard Top Albums (mono) number-one album June 12, 1961 - July 17, 1961	Succeeded by Carnival! by Original Broadway Cast Recording

== Film adaptation ==
A film adaptation, directed by Joshua Logan, was released in 1967. It stars Richard Harris as Arthur, Vanessa Redgrave as Guenevere, Franco Nero as Lancelot and David Hemmings as Mordred.

== Sources ==
- Lerner, Alan Jay. The Street Where I Live (1978). W. W. Norton & Company, ISBN 0-393-07532-X
- Kantor, Michael and Maslon, Laurence. Broadway: The American Musical (2004). Bluefinch Press, New York, ISBN 978-0-8212-2905-7
