= Thando Mgqolozana =

South African novelist (born 1983)

- Born: 27 August 1983 (age 42); Cape Town
- Citizenship: South Africa
- Occupation(s): Novelist, Screenwriter

Thando Mgqolozana (born 27 August 1983, in Cape Town, South Africa) is a Mandela Rhodes Scholar, a recipient of the Golden Key International Honour for Scholastic Achievement, and one of the Mail & Guardian’s Top 200 Young South Africans of 2010. He has previously worked as a researcher at the Human Sciences Research Council and is now based at the University of Cape Town.

Mgqolozana is the author of Hear Me Alone (2011), A Man Who Is Not a Man (2009), a novel that enjoyed critical success and was long-listed for the International Dublin Literary Award, and Unimportance (2014).

Mgqolozana is the co-writer of Inxeba (The Wound) (2017), an award-winning film, inspired by his novel, A Man Who Is Not A Man, about the Xhosa traditional initiation into manhood.

In 2021, his ex-wife accused him of intimate partner abuse.
