= Anthem: Homunculus =

Musical podcast by John Cameron Mitchell

- Genre: Musical theatre
- Format: Audio podcast
- Country of origin: United States
- Language: American English

Creative team
- Created by: John Cameron Mitchell; Bryan Weller
- Written by: John Cameron Mitchell
- Directed by: John Cameron Mitchell

Cast and voices
- Starring: John Cameron Mitchell
- Voices: Glenn Close; Cynthia Erivo; Patti LuPone; Denis O'Hare; Laurie Anderson; Nakhane; Christopher Hanke; Ben Foster; Bridget Everett

Music
- Composed by: John Cameron Mitchell; Bryan Weller

Production
- Production: Topic Studios
- Length: 320 minutes (26–45 min/episode)

Technical specifications
- Audio format: Joint Stereo MP3 (128 kbit/s, 44.1kHz)

Publication
- No. of seasons: 1
- No. of episodes: 10
- Original release: April 22 – May 18, 2019 (6 years ago)
- Provider: Luminary (2019–2021, exclusive); Acast (October 12, 2021–)
- Updates: Ended

Related
- Website: shows.acast.com/anthem

Anthem: Homunculus is a musical podcast series written by John Cameron Mitchell and Bryan Weller starring Mitchell, Glenn Close, Cynthia Erivo, Patti LuPone, Denis O'Hare, Laurie Anderson, Nakhane, Christopher Hanke, Ben Foster, Bridget Everett and Gail Thomas. The show was produced by Topic Studios and initially released exclusively on Luminary and presently distributed by Acast.

== Background ==
The podcast debuted on April 23, 2019. and was created by John Cameron Mitchell (director, scriptwriter, co-songwriter) and Bryan Weller (co-songwriter and music producer). The first draft was developed at William S. Burroughs's former house in Lawrence, Kansas where Mitchell and Weller were invited to work by Burrough's longtime partner James Grauerholz. Anthem: Homunculus is a ten-episode fictional musical audio series totalling over five hours. The premise and structure stemmed from an unfinished sequel to Hedwig and the Angry Inch ("Hedwig and the Divine Homunculus") that Mitchell abandoned and reworked into a "speculative autobiography" in which he wonders what might have become of him if he had never left his small town of Junction City, Kansas. The plot involves a Mitchell-like protagonist, Ceann MacKay, who attempts to crowdfund his brain tumor health care through an audio telethon. Seizures periodically send him to an afterlife where he wrestles with characters from his past. Mitchell and Weller initially pitched the idea for television, but were rejected so they reconceived it as an audio piece. The show features 31 songs written by Weller and Mitchell that span multiple genres. The soundtrack for the podcast was released on May 20, 2019, by Ghostlight Records.

== Cast ==
Glenn Close plays his mother, Maeve, who in this liminal space demands forgiveness by way of a heavy metal song while nailing herself to a cross. Patti Lupone plays Sister Max, his junky jazz singer-turned-nun aunt who is his most supportive family member. Ceann's lover Jairo is played by South African musician/actor Nakhane whom Mitchell cast through DM on Instagram. The part of Joan the Baptist, a singing evangelist for the Virgin Mary, was written for Cynthia Erivo whom he had seen on Broadway in The Color Purple.

== Reception ==
The Guardian included the show on their list of the best podcasts of 2019 saying that the show "is a heartrending and hilarious combination of music, theatre and drama". Rolling Stone called it "a hallucinatory masterpiece", Slate deemed it "a game changer", and The Atlantic called it one of the best podcasts of 2019, featuring "superbly rendered dialogue". The podcast was an honoree in the scripted fiction category during the 2020 Webby Awards. The podcast had a live marathon listening party at the IFC Center on November 24, 2019. Later listening parties took place in Austin, San Francisco and Portland, Oregon.
