= Gina Wilkinson =

- Born: March 10, 1960; Victoria, British Columbia, Canada
- Died: December 30, 2010 (aged 50); Toronto, Ontario, Canada
- Occupation: Actress
- Years active: 1986–2010
- Spouse: Tom Rooney (widower)

Gina Wilkinson (March 10, 1960 – December 30, 2010) was a Canadian actress of stage, film, and television, as well as a playwright and stage director.

== Early life and education ==
Wilkinson was born on March 10, 1960, in Victoria, Canada. Her father, Jack Wilkinson, was a visual artist, and her mother, Marie Wilkinson, was a ballet dancer.

She attended the National Theatre School of Canada.

== Career ==
Wilkinson spent the majority of her early career as an actor; however, she later expanded to directing. In 2007, Wilkinson directed Born Yesterday at the Shaw Festival. In 2010, she directed Faith Healer for Soulpepper. She also directed Half an Hour for the Shaw Festival. In 2010, Wilkinson directed the world premiere of Brendan Gall's Wide Awake Hearts at Tarragon Theatre.

== Personal life ==
Wilkinson was diagnosed with stage 4 cervical cancer on November 21, 2010. Wilkinson married her longtime partner, actor Tom Rooney, while in hospital receiving treatment on December 19, 2010. She died on December 30, 2010, aged 50.

== Legacy ==
Shortly after her death, the Gina Wilkinson Prize was established in Wilkinson's honour. The award offers financial support to a Canadian female theatre artist/leader.

== Plays ==
- My Mother's Feet
- Whistle Me Home

== Filmography ==
=== Film ===
Year	Title	Role	Notes
1986	The Last Season	Lucy Shannon	
1987	Blue Monkey	Nurse Michelle	
1991	Sam & Me	Mariana	
1998	Blues Brothers 2000	Dancer	
2002	Ararat	Art Teacher	

=== Filmography ===
Year	Title	Role	Notes
1984–1986	Hangin' In	Rosanna	10 episodes
1987–1991	Street Legal	Nellie MacLean / Chris Robinson	3 episodes
1990	On Thin Ice: The Tai Babilonia Story		Television film
1990	Dracula: The Series	Contessa Delores de Suarez y Suarez	Episode: "A Little Nightmare Music"
1991	Shining Time Station	Passenger	Episode: "Sweet and Sour"
1991, 1992	E.N.G.	Gina Patrini / Mary Benett	2 episodes
1994	Fatal Vows: The Alexandra O'Hara Story	Mrs. Flores	Television film
1995	Love and Betrayal: The Mia Farrow Story	Vicky	Television film
1995	Forever Knight	Seline	Episode: "A More Permanent Hell"
1995	Kung Fu: The Legend Continues	Cynthia Jergens	Episode: "Eye Witness"
1996	Psi Factor	Dr. Stafford	Episode: "The Freefall/Presence"
1999	Exhibit A: Secrets of Forensic Science	Phoebe	Episode: "Mapping Evil"
2001	Le porte-bonheur	Justine	Television film
2002	Bliss	Alice	Episode: "In Praise of Drunkenness and Fornication"
2003	Missing	Teresa Rasenti	Episode: "I Thought I Knew You"
2003	Street Time	Glenda	Episode: "Born to Kill"
2004	The Eleventh Hour	Lucy Bryrant	Episode: "Wonderland"
2004	Blue Murder	Tina Aimsely	Episode: "Family Reunion"
2004–2006	This Is Wonderland	C.A. Anna-Lynn Monteal	18 episodes
2005	Kojak	Mrs. Howard	Episode: "All Bets Off: Part 1"
2008	Wisegal	Mary Russo	Television film
2009	The Border	Carol	Episode: "Spoils of War"
2011	Skins	Davina	Episode: "Cadie"
