= Hello Again (1987 film) =

1987 film by Frank Perry

- Theatrical release poster
- Directed by: Frank Perry
- Written by: Susan Isaacs
- Produced by: Frank Perry
- Starring: Shelley Long; Judith Ivey; Gabriel Byrne; Corbin Bernsen; Sela Ward
- Cinematography: Jan Weincke
- Edited by: Peter C. Frank; Trudy Ship
- Music by: William Goldstein
- Production companies: Touchstone Pictures; Silver Screen Partners III
- Distributed by: Buena Vista Pictures Distribution
- Release date: November 6, 1987
- Running time: 96 minutes
- Country: United States
- Language: English
- Box office: $20,419,446 (USA)

Hello Again is a 1987 American romantic fantasy film directed and produced by Frank Perry, written by Susan Isaacs and starring Shelley Long, Judith Ivey, Gabriel Byrne, Corbin Bernsen, Sela Ward, Austin Pendleton, Carrie Nye, Robert Lewis, Madeleine Potter, Thor Fields and Illeana Douglas.

== Plot ==
Long Island housewife Lucy Chadman is in the midst of a tarot card reading by her sister, Zelda. Just as Zelda exclaims something is going to happen, Lucy begins to choke to death on a South Korean chicken ball. The film shows the difficulty of Lucy's loved ones, including Zelda, had in coping with her death. But the grief turns to excitement when Zelda receives a book of spells called The Wisdom of Catagonia. Within the book Zelda finds a spell that requires perfect astrological timing—the moon, the earth, and the dog star must form a perfect isosceles triangle. Zelda performs the spell and Lucy appears.

Lucy begins to reacquaint herself with living and with her family who are shocked to see her alive again, one year later, and soon discovers that she cannot simply pick her life back up where she left off. She returns to find her widower husband Jason has sold their home and married Kim Lacey, her greedy and double-crossing friend from college. Meanwhile, her son Danny has opened his own successful restaurant and married, instead of going to Columbia.

When Lucy returns to the hospital in which she died, Dr. Kevin Scanlon, the emergency room doctor who tried to revive her begins to fall for her. Zelda confides in Scanlon that if Lucy does not find love by the next full moon, she will have to go back to the spirit world but he does not believe Zelda. Eventually, the press finds out that Lucy came back from the dead, and plague her, her family, and the hospital Scanlon works at. Kim becomes jealous of Lucy's media attention and the attention she is getting from Jason. She holds a news conference of her own and tells the media Lucy made the whole thing up—claiming that Lucy used tetrodotoxin as a means to fake her own death. Lucy does not defend herself, as she sees this as an opportunity to rid herself and her friends of the media. Instead, Scanlon gets fired, Zelda's occult store is vandalized and she is hated by almost everyone, except her family. She decides to end the debacle once and for all by tricking Kim into admitting she lied about Lucy faking her death in front of the media at a party the hospital is having. Lucy, Scanlon, and her family walk away happily. As the credits roll, we see that both Lucy and Zelda get married and have children with their new loves. Danny also becomes a father.

== Cast ==
- Shelley Long as Lucy Chadman
- Judith Ivey as Zelda
- Gabriel Byrne as Dr. Kevin Scanlon
- Corbin Bernsen as Dr. Jason Chadman
- Sela Ward as Kim Lacey
- Austin Pendleton as Junior Lacey
- Carrie Nye as Regina Holt
- Robert Lewis as Phineas Devereaux
- Madeleine Potter as Felicity Glick
- Thor Fields as Danny Chadman
- Kate McGregor-Stewart as Reporter #1
- Lynne Thigpen as Reporter #2
- Tony Sirico as Tough Guy

== Reception ==
Hello Again was released theatrically by Touchstone Pictures on November 6, 1987. The film opened at No. 2 at the box office, earning $5,712,892 at its opening weekend. It ultimately grossed $20,419,446 in its entire run.

On the review aggregator website Rotten Tomatoes, 10% of 21 critics' reviews are positive, with an average rating of 3.7/10. Audiences surveyed by CinemaScore gave the film an average grade of "B−" on a scale of A+ to F.

Roger Ebert gave the film 2 stars out of 4, complaining that it went for "sitcom dialogue" and "funny one-liners," rather than honestly exploring "how people would respond to the reappearance of a dead person." Gene Siskel gave it 1 and a half stars, labeling it a "pathetic comedy" with humor that didn't work at all. Vincent Canby of The New York Times called it "a high-concept comedy with a terminally low laugh content."
