= Love and Betrayal: The Mia Farrow Story =

- Written by: Cynthia A. Cherbak
- Directed by: Karen Arthur
- Starring: Patsy Kensit; Dennis Boutsikaris; Richard Muenz; Robert LuPone; Gina Wilkinson; Frances Helm
- Composer: David Michael Frank
- Country of origin: United States
- Original language: English
- No. of episodes: 2

Production
- Producer: Terence A. Donnelly
- Cinematography: Tom Neuwirth
- Editor: Caroline Biggerstaff
- Running time: 240 minutes
- Production company: Fox Circle Productions

Original release
- Network: Fox
- Release: February 28 – March 2, 1995

Love and Betrayal: The Mia Farrow Story is a 1995 American drama miniseries directed by Karen Arthur and written by Cynthia A. Cherbak. The film stars Patsy Kensit, Dennis Boutsikaris, Richard Muenz, Robert LuPone, Gina Wilkinson and Frances Helm. The film aired on Fox in two parts on February 28, 1995, and on March 2, 1995.

In 2016, Dennis Boutsikaris, who played Woody Allen in Love and Betrayal, wrote an article titled "How I Tried to Not Embarrass Myself Playing Woody Allen in a ’90s TV Biopic." Recalling a producer who told him, “We don’t want an imitation, we want a suggestion,” Boutsikaris noted, "On re-watching the film 22 years later, one or two of the scenes make me feel like, yes, against all odds, I actually pulled off something between a "suggestion" and a human being. Other moments, I want to crawl under the DVR and wait for the all-clear siren."

== Cast ==
- Patsy Kensit as Mia Farrow
- Dennis Boutsikaris as Woody Allen
- Richard Muenz as Frank Sinatra
- Robert LuPone as André Previn
- Gina Wilkinson as Vicky
- Frances Helm as Maureen O'Sullivan
- Taryn Davis as Dylan #3
- Grace Una as Soon-Yi Previn
- Bruce McCarty as Roman Polanski
- Nigel Bennett as John Farrow
- Lynne Cormack as Dory Previn
- Heidi von Palleske as young Maureen O'Sullivan
- Michael Tait as Judge Wilk
- Natalie Miller as young Mia Farrow
- Kristi Groteke as herself
- Christine Andreas as Ava Gardner
- Pamela Sinha as Krish
- Caley Wilson as Michael Farrow
- Tina Su as Soon-Yi #2
- Alan Rose as Joey D
- Donna Coney Island as Liza
- Susan Potvin as Rachel
- Natalie Gray as Andre's mistress
- Jay Bajaj as Maharishi
- Damon Redfern as Robert Redford
- Laura Catalano as Starlett
- Chandra West as Mariel Hemingway
- Mia Kim Steinberg as Daisy #2
- Hayden Christensen as Fletcher
- Daniel Lee as Moses #2
- Jordon Sim as Fletcher #1
- Fiona Meng Yen To as Lark #1
- Roseanne Li as Daisy #1
- Micah Uemura as Moses #1
- Shoral Jamieson as Dylan #2
- Robin Dunne as Fletcher #3
- Quyen Hua as Lark #3
- Kim Johnson as Daisy #3
- Joshua Hagley as Moses #3
- Max Naiman as Satchel #3
- Lianna Yeung as Tam Farrow
- Katlin Yeung as Soon-Yi #1

== Parody ==
Love and Betrayal: The Mia Farrow Story was parodied by The Simpsons in the ninth season episode "Lisa's Sax" (1997). The opening scene of the episode depicts a TV movie broadcast by The WB titled The Krusty the Klown Story: Booze, Drugs, Guns, Lies, Blackmail and Laughter, in which Krusty the Clown is portrayed as having "a disastrous marriage to Mia Farrow."
