= Manodrome =

2023 film by John Trengove

- Theatrical release poster
- Directed by: John Trengove
- Written by: John Trengove
- Produced by: Gina Gammell; Ben Giladi; Ryan Zacarias; Riley Keough
- Starring: Jesse Eisenberg; Adrien Brody; Odessa Young; Sallieu Sesay; Philip Ettinger; Ethan Suplee; Evan Jonigkeit; Caleb Eberhardt
- Cinematography: Wyatt Garfield
- Edited by: Julie Monroe; Matthew Swanepoel
- Music by: Christopher Stracey
- Production companies: Capstone Studios; Felix Culpa; Liminal Content; Riverside Entertainment
- Distributed by: Lionsgate Grindstone Entertainment Group (United States); Universal Pictures (United Kingdom)
- Release dates: February 17, 2023 (Berlin); November 10, 2023 (United States)
- Running time: 96 minutes
- Countries: United States; United Kingdom
- Language: English

Manodrome is a 2023 drama thriller film written and directed by John Trengove. It stars Jesse Eisenberg, Adrien Brody, Odessa Young, Sallieu Sesay, Philip Ettinger, Ethan Suplee, Evan Jonigkeit, and Caleb Eberhardt. The film is Trengove's English language debut and premiered at the 73rd Berlin International Film Festival on February 18, 2023. It was released by Lionsgate in the United States on November 10, 2023.

== Plot ==
Having been fired from his job, Ralphie works as a rideshare driver to support himself and his pregnant girlfriend, Sal. He works out at a local gym with his friend Jason, who sells Ralphie prescription pills. Jason suggests Ralphie meet some of his friends, claiming they have resources to get him back on his feet.

At a restaurant, Ralphie is introduced to a group of men led by the charismatic "Dad Dan." He notices the men are each branded with a tattoo of a triangle with a line across the top. After the dinner, Dad Dan approaches Ralphie in his car. He tells Ralphie that he understands his pain, suggesting he has the look of someone who never had a father figure. The next day, Jason gives Ralphie a new pair of sneakers, telling him it is a gift from the group for making a good impression.

Ralphie attends a meeting at the group's expansive house outside the city. Each man introduces himself as a "Son" or "Dad," and how long they have been practicing celibacy. Ralphie is surprised by the men's open misogyny, revealing these men have all left their spouses to live on this compound together. While exploring the house, Ralphie discovers a gun inside Dad Dan's office desk. Rather than scold him, Dad Dan warmly invites Ralphie to join this "family." He tells Ralphie that he sees a staggering beauty inside of him, with a power to create and annihilate.

Ralphie drives a young kid, who accidentally leaves his phone in the backseat. Ralphie pawns the phone for cash, much to Sal's dismay. Ralphie attends another group meeting, where Dad Dan breaks him down during an initiation exercise. Ralphie reveals his inner rage and the group suggests he leave his girlfriend. While driving at night, Ralphie picks up a gay couple outside a club. When they attempt to have sex in his backseat, Ralphie slams the car to a halt, then dangerously speeds through the streets.

The group goes shopping at a mall. Ralphie refuses to have Dad Dan pay for an expensive shirt for him, instead using his own limited savings. As the group is leaving they run into group member Brad's spouse, who he had abandoned. Ralphie watches her berate Brad, realizing he has made a mistake and attempts to flee. Dad Dan urges Ralphie to take back his power instead. After slapping himself in the bathroom, Ralphie attacks a stranger in a fit of rage.

Sal questions Ralphie about his behavior, leading to a heated argument where Ralphie walks out on her. Ralphie moves into the group's home and is initiated into the group by being branded. After celebrating, Dad Dan offers his gun to Ralphie, who reveals that his father walked out on his family on Christmas Day. Dad Dan attempts to fuel Ralphie's descent further by claiming "There is no god, but Ralph." Ralphie strikes Dad Dan and escapes the compound.

After encountering bodybuilder Ahmet at the gym, Ralphie follows him to an industrial factory. Inside, Ahmet proceeds to have anal sex with him. When they finish, Ahmet introduces himself, but Ralphie suddenly shoots him dead, stealing his truck and pawning his personal belongings. Ralphie returns to Sal, who has just delivered their baby Jayce in the hospital. Ralphie returns from grocery shopping to discover that Sal has left him, leaving only a note that says "Forgive me."

Ralphie returns to Dad Dan's compound with his baby, but is soon followed by police looking to arrest him for Ahmet's murder. Ralphie reveals the gun, demanding the group help him. They take the baby upstairs and Ralphie leads the group in a chant, then shoots Dad Dan in the head. He shoots a police officer, then flees the compound and escapes into the woods. Ralphie eventually comes upon a senior living community, where he breaks into the kitchen pantry for food. A worker discovers him and offers to help him. Ralphie puts the gun to his own head and pulls the trigger, but the gun doesn't fire and he collapses. The worker cooks a meal for Ralphie and tells him a story. Ralphie curls up into the worker, who embraces him like a scared child as police arrive at the scene.

== Cast ==
- Jesse Eisenberg as Ralphie
- Adrien Brody as Dan
- Odessa Young as Sal
- Sallieu Sesay as Ahmet
- Philip Ettinger as Jason
- Ethan Suplee as Leo
- Evan Jonigkeit as Brad
- Caleb Eberhardt as Aaron
- Gheorghe Mureșan as Sachiel
- Matthew Lamb as Raymond

== Production ==
The film is Trengove's English language debut. Riley Keough was initially cast as Sal, but departed the role due to schedule conflicts. She remains attached to the film as a producer.

Casting for extras occurred in November 2021. Principal photography took place in Syracuse, New York from November 21, 2021 to January 4, 2022, under the shooting title, "Untitled Rust Belt".

== Release ==
Manodrome had its world premiere at the 73rd Berlin International Film Festival and screened February 18, 2023 in the opening weekend of the Main Competition. The film was nominated for the prestigious Golden Bear, in addition to the Teddy Award for Queer Cinema. It was released in the United States by Lionsgate Films in theaters and digital on November 10, 2023.

== Reception ==
On the review aggregator website Rotten Tomatoes, 49% of 35 critics' reviews are positive, with an average rating of 5.8/10. The website's consensus reads: "Jesse Eisenberg does some impressive work in Manodrome, even if the story isn't quite deep or nuanced enough to support his deeply committed performance." Metacritic, which uses a weighted average, assigned the film a score of 48 out of 100, based on 13 critics, indicating "mixed or average" reviews.

The Playlist labeled the film as the "Best Eisenberg offering in over a decade." Chris Barsanti of Slant Magazine praised Trengove for his cinematic craftsmanship, stating "While Trengrove’s skill is apparent in the slow build of tension, it truly stands out in the arguably more impressive way he holds Ralphie’s view of the world separate from that of the film’s." Awards Daily called the film "A thought-provoking piece of queer filmmaking that should not be missed." Deadline compared the film to Taxi Driver, writing that its tone and brutal treatment of male violence may not appeal to everyone. According to The Hollywood Reporter, the film tackles themes of toxic masculinity and power dynamics in relationships through a story of a men's retreat, but its execution is too extreme, and the depiction of a poisonous cult of men whose entitlement is matched by their sense of victimhood can be shocking to some. David Rooney wrote that Jesse Eisenberg's performance as the tightly coiled Ralphie is compelling and "generally rises above the lofty self-seriousness of a movie that aims to sound the death knell on toxic masculinity."

Variety's Peter Debruge wrote that Manodrome struggled to live up to its provocative premise, lacking the depth and nuance needed to effectively explore the state of contemporary masculinity, saying, "The characters feel thin, the secret society seems implausible and its goals too vague to capture the imagination." Writing for Cineuropa, Davide Abbatescianni described the film's final result as a "captivating pastiche made up of thriller, psychological drama and surreal comedy tropes, filled with crazy twists and turns...This hodgepodge may be amusing or fascinating to some, but frustrating to others. That being said, viewers certainly should not expect a serious treatment of any of the themes this movie aims to broach," he warned.

Collider's review, titled "Jesse Eisenberg Struggles With Inner Rage in Raw Deconstruction of Masculinity," said that Manodrome may have its imperfections, but it offered a thoughtful exploration of toxic masculinity and its impact, as well as a strong warning about the dangers of enabling broken men. It writes, "it serves as a gritty character study where Eisenberg can flex some new acting muscles. Add the always-reliable Brody to the mix, and it’s easy to forgive Manodrome's imperfections."
