= Richard Muenz =

American actor and baritone (born 1948)

Richard Muenz (born March 9, 1948) is an American actor and baritone who is mostly known for his work within American theatre. Muenz has frequently performed in musicals and in concerts. He has also periodically acted on television.

== Early life and education ==
Born in Hartford, Connecticut, and grew up in the Ridgewood, New Jersey, area. He graduated from Ridgewood High School and then attended Eastern University in St. Davids, Pennsylvania, where he was a voice major.

== Career ==
He began his career as a member of the New York City Opera's chorus with whom he sang for three seasons during the early 1970s. At the same time he became a member of the Gregg Smith Singers, with whom he made nine recordings over a couple of years; including William Schuman's The Mighty Casey. He also had the honor of performing Brahms's Liebeslieder Waltzes at Carnegie Hall with the ensemble.

In 1975 Muenz performed the role of Sam in a production of Leonard Bernstein's Trouble in Tahiti at the Whitney Museum. Bernstein was in the audience and after the show he invited Muenz personally to join the cast of his upcoming Broadway musical 1600 Pennsylvania Avenue. He accepted and made his Broadway debut when the production premiered in the Spring of 1976 portraying a variety of smaller roles. The following year he joined the long running Off-Broadway production of The Fantasticks as El Gallo. In 1979 he returned to Broadway as Joe in the revival of The Most Happy Fella which was recorded live for television broadcast on PBS's Great Performances. That same year he joined the cast of Ryan's Hope, portraying the role of Joe Novak from 1979 to 1980.

In 1980 Muenz was cast as Lancelot in the revival of Lerner and Loewe's Camelot with Richard Burton as King Arthur and Christine Ebersole as Guenevere. When the show moved from the New York State Theater to the Winter Garden Theatre the following year, he stayed with the production, now sharing the stage with Richard Harris as Arthur and Meg Bussert as Guenevere. This second cast was recorded live for television broadcast on HBO. In 1983 he portrayed Cadet Dick Thorpe in George Gershwin and Sigmund Romberg's Rosalie at Town Hall with the New Amsterdam Theater Company. In 1985 he appeared as a guest star on the Scarecrow and Mrs. King episode "Over the Limit". In 1986 he was a guest star on Highway to Heaven in the episode "To Bind the Wounds" and the following year he appeared on Kate & Allie in the episode "Ted's Fix-Up". In 1988 he returned to Broadway as Joe in the original cast of Chess. In 1989 he appeared in the world premiere of the Off-Broadway hit of Richard Maltby, Jr. and David Shire's Closer Than Ever at the Cherry Lane Theatre. A critical success, the show ran for 312 performances and a CD recording was made on the RCA Victor label.

In 1990 Muenz portrayed the role of Samuel Cooper in Kurt Weill's Love Life at the American Music Theater Festival in Philadelphia. In 1995 he appeared as Frank Sinatra in the television movie Love and Betrayal: The Mia Farrow Story. In 1996 he appeared Off-Broadway as Eddie Flagrante in John Dempsey's Zombie Prom at the Variety Arts Theatre. In 1998 he was a guest star on the Law & Order episode "Scrambled". In 1999 he stepped in to cover a few performances for Tom Wopat as Frank Butler in the Broadway revival of Irving Berlin's Annie Get Your Gun, portraying the role opposite Bernadette Peters. In 2000 he appeared as Robert Baker in New York City Center Encores!'s production of Bernstein's Wonderful Town. In 2001 he narrated Great Performances's tribute to Aaron Copland, Copland's America. In 2005 he returned to Broadway as Pat Denning in the revival of 42nd Street, a role he had previously portrayed on Broadway in 2001.

Muenz's other performing credits include appearances on three seasons of Garrison Keillor’s The American Radio Company of the Air, Jean-Luc on Guiding Light, Dr. Kessler on Another World, the national tour of Jerry Zaks’ revival of Guys and Dolls as Sky Masterson, the National tour of The Sound of Music, performances with the Night Kitchen Radio Theater, and the Broadway companies of High Society and Nick & Nora. He has also appeared in several productions with the New York City Opera, including Bob in Wonderful Town, File in 110 in the Shade, Danilo in The Merry Widow, and Sid in The Pajama Game, the latter of which garnered him a Drama Desk Award nomination.

== Filmography ==
=== Film ===
Year	Title	Role	Notes
1997	Leonard Bernstein's New York	Self	Documentary

=== Television ===
Year	Title	Role	Notes
1979–1980	Ryan's Hope	Joe Novak	119 episodes
1980, 2001	Great Performances	Narrator / Joe	2 episodes
1982	Camelot	Lancelot du Lac	Television film
1985	Scarecrow and Mrs. King	Eric Sullivan	Episode: "Over the Limit"
1986	Crazy Like a Fox	Peter	Episode: "You Can't Keep a Good Corpse Down"
1986	Highway to Heaven	Gary Lee	Episode: "To Bind the Wounds"
1987	Kate & Allie	Roger	Episode: "Ted's Fix-Up"
1988	William Tell	Lord Montal	Episode: "Ladyship"
1990	H.E.L.P.	Paul Butler	Episode: "Steam Heat"
1990	Working It Out	Brian Burnell	Episode: "Old Boyfriends"
1995	Love and Betrayal: The Mia Farrow Story	Frank Sinatra	Television film
1998	Trinity	Tall Guy	Episode: "In Loco Parentis"
1998	Law & Order	Derek Sloan	Episode: "Scrambled"
