= The Wound (2017 film) =

2017 film

- Film poster
- Xhosa: Inxeba
- Directed by: John Trengove
- Written by: John Trengove; Thando Mgqolozana; Malusi Bengu
- Produced by: Elias Ribeiro; Cait Pansegrouw
- Starring: Nakhane
- Cinematography: Paul Ozgur
- Edited by: Matthew Swanepoel
- Music by: João Orecchia
- Release date: 22 January 2017 (Sundance)
- Running time: 88 minutes
- Countries: South Africa; France; Germany
- Language: Xhosa
- Box office: $30,678 (USA) R598,571 (ZA)

The Wound (Xhosa: Inxeba Xhosa pronunciation: [íŋǁeːɓa]) is a 2017 South African drama film directed by John Trengove. It was screened in the World Cinema Dramatic Competition at the 2017 Sundance Film Festival and the Panorama section of the 67th Berlin International Film Festival. The film opened the Tel Aviv International LGBT Film Festival 2017. It was selected as the South African entry for the Best Foreign Language Film at the 90th Academy Awards, making the December shortlist.

== Plot ==
The story tracks a closeted relationship between two men in the context of the Xhosa initiation ritual of Ulwaluko. Xolani, a factory worker, joins the men of his community at the annual ceremony in the mountains of Eastern Cape. In addition to serving as a mentor to the initiates, Xolani looks forward to the event as it provides him the opportunity to reestablish his sexual and romantic relationship with Vija. When Xolani is assigned to be the mentor of Kwanda, a young man from Johannesburg, he quickly realizes that Kwanda is also gay, and Kwanda soon realizes the nature of the relationship between Vija and Xolani. Tensions soon emerge between the three.

== Cast ==
- Nakhane as Xolani
- Bongile Mantsai as Vija
- Niza Jay Ncoyini as Kwanda
- Siphosethu "Seth Singer" Ngcetane as Nkosi
- Loyiso Lloyd N Ngqayana as Vija's Initiate
- Sibabalwe Esbie Ngqayana as Zuko
- Halalisani Bradley Cebekhulu as Lukas
- Inga Qwede as Ncedo

== Production ==
Inspiration for The Wound came after director John Trengove read A Man Who is Not a Man, a novel by Thando Mgqolozana on the topic of the Xhosa initiation ceremony. Trengove wished to challenge the notion that homosexuality was a product of western culture that posed a threat to traditional African culture. The film received funding from the National Film and Video Foundation. Cultural experts were consulted to ensure the authenticity of the material.

== Reception ==
On review aggregator Rotten Tomatoes, the film holds an approval rating of 89%, based on 44 reviews with an average rating of 7.3/10. The website's critical consensus reads, "The Wound uses its complex, timely story as effective grist for a thought-provoking exploration of the human dynamic." Metacritic gives the film a weighted average score of 80 out of 100, based on 14 critics, indicating "generally favorable reviews".

=== Accolades ===
Inxeba received 19 awards at 44 festivals worldwide; received eight South African Film and Television Awards (SAFTA) nominationsm and won five including Best Feature Film, Best Actor in a Feature Film, Best Supporting Actor in a Feature Film, Best Achievement in Directing in a Feature Film, and Best Achievement in Editing in a Feature Film and was short-listed for an Oscar in the Best Foreign Language Film category.

Year	Award	Category	Nominee(s)	Result	Ref.
2018	South African Film and Television Awards	Best Feature Film	Inxeba	Won	
2018	South African Film and Television Awards	Best Supporting Actor in a Feature Film	Bongile Mantsai	Won	
2018	South African Film and Television Awards	Best Actor in a Feature Film	Nakhane	Won	
2018	South African Film and Television Awards	Best Achievement in Directing in a Feature Film	John Trengove	Won	
2018	South African Film and Television Awards	Best Achievement in Editing in a Feature Film	Matthew Swanepoel	Won	
2018	Academy Award	Best Foreign Language Film	The Wound	Made shortlist	

=== Controversy ===
The film has been accused of portraying secretive initiation rituals. However, other media covering the same topic, like Nelson Mandela's Long Walk to Freedom, have not received similar criticism, leading to accusations that complaints about the film are instead motivated by homophobia.

A day after the film's release in South Africa, cinemas in the Eastern Cape province were forced to cancel screenings of the film and offer refunds because of protests, intimidation and vandalism. Nu Metro Cinemas subsequently cancelled screenings countrywide, while Ster-Kinekor continued to show it outside of the Eastern Cape. The film's producers filed complaints with the Human Rights Commission and the Commission for Gender Equality over threats and violence. Crew and cast received death threats and were forced to go into hiding.

=== Reclassification ===
The film was initially classified as 16LS by South Africa's Film and Publication Board (FPB), but was later reclassified as X18 by the FPB's Appeal Tribunal after complaints by the Congress of Traditional Leaders of South Africa and other cultural and Christian organisations. X18 is the rating reserved for hardcore pornography, although Inxeba contains none, and meant that distribution was limited to premises licensed to show pornography, resulting in the film's removal from all South African cinemas. The Democratic Alliance criticised the decision of the Appeal Tribunal, characterising it as "nothing short of censorship" by "patriarchs and homophobes". FPB classifiers themselves have concluded that the Appeal Tribunal's rating amounted to unlawful censorship based on homophobia.

Urucu Media, the producers of Inxeba, and the SA Screen Federation challenged the film's X18 rating in court, on the basis that they were denied an opportunity to make representation to the Tribunal, and that the Appeal Tribunal's decision was incompatible with the principles of the Constitution of the Republic of South Africa. In March 2018 the Gauteng Division of the High Court allowed the film to be shown in cinemas with an 18 rating while the court action was pending. In June 2018 the court overturned the Appeal Tribunal's decision and restored the original rating of 16LS.

== See also ==
- Official website for Inxeba | The Wound
- List of submissions to the 90th Academy Awards for Best Foreign Language Film
- List of South African submissions for the Academy Award for Best Foreign Language Film
