= Embrace (novel) =

2001 novel by Mark Behr

- Author: Mark Behr
- Language: English
- Genre: Novel
- Publisher: Abacus Press (UK)
- Publication date: February 2001
- Publication place: South Africa
- Media type: Hardback and paperback
- Pages: 736 pp
- ISBN: 0-349-11300-9
- OCLC: 45339251

Embrace is a 2001 novel by South African author Mark Behr.

Embrace is the story of the sexual awakening of Karl De Man, a 13-year-old pupil at the Berg, an exclusive boys' school in South Africa in the 1970s. Karl's time at school is interwoven with descriptions of his time at home with his loving, but traditional, family.

Karl is punished after joining in casual sexual games in the dormitory, Karl falls in love. He simultaneously has an affair with his best friend, Dominic, whose liberal parents know he is gay, and his choirmaster, Jacques Cilliers.
