= John Cameron Mitchell =

American film director (born 1963)

- Mitchell in 2026
- Born: April 21, 1963 (age 63); El Paso, Texas, U.S.
- Education: Northwestern University (1981–1985)
- Occupations: Actor, playwright, screenwriter, film director
- Years active: 1983–present
- Notable work: Hedwig and the Angry Inch, rock musical and film

John Cameron Mitchell (born April 21, 1963) is a Tony Award-winning American actor, director, playwright, screenwriter, singer, songwriter and producer. He is known as the writer, director and star of the 2001 film Hedwig and the Angry Inch, which is based on the stage musical of the same name. He also co-created the 2019 musical audio series Anthem: Homunculus and portrayed the role of Joe Exotic in the Peacock limited series Joe vs. Carole in 2022.

== Early years ==
Mitchell was born in El Paso, Texas, the second child of U.S. Army Lieutenant John Henderson Mitchell and Joan Cameron, arriving less than a year after the loss of their first child, James. He was raised on a variety of military bases as dictated by his father's career who rose to the rank of major general and served as United States Commander, Berlin (USCOB) from 1984 to 1988, in charge of the American sector of the city. His mother was a native of Glasgow, Scotland, who immigrated to North America to be an elementary school teacher. She became known for her watercolor portraits of Kirk Douglas, cellist Mstislav Rostropovich, U.S. Surgeon General C. Everett Koop, and Pakistani prime minister Benazir Bhutto, as well as for religious art she made for the Roman Catholic dioceses of Denver and Colorado Springs. John had three younger brothers: Christopher Lloyd, Colin Mackenzie, and Samuel Latham Mitchell—who died at age four in 1977. His grandfather, William Lloyd Mitchell, was Social Security Commissioner under U.S. presidents Dwight D. Eisenhower and John F. Kennedy.

He attended Catholic schools for most of his youth, including St. Xavier High School in Junction City, Kansas, and St. Pius X High School in Albuquerque, New Mexico, graduating from the latter in 1981. Mitchell's first stage role was as the Virgin Mary in a Nativity musical staged at a Scottish Benedictine boys' boarding school, Carlekemp Priory Prep School, when he was 11 years old. He studied theater and performance studies at Northwestern University under Frank Galati from 1981 to 1985; he did not graduate.

== Career ==
Mitchell's first professional stage role was Huckleberry Finn in a 1985 Organic Theater adaptation at Chicago's Goodman Theatre, and portrayed the same character in his first New York acting role in the 1985 Broadway musical Big River. He originated the role of Dickon on Broadway in The Secret Garden, and appeared in the original cast of the off-Broadway musical Hello Again, receiving Drama Desk nominations for both roles, and can be heard on the original cast recordings for each.

He appeared in the original cast of John Guare's Six Degrees of Separation (both off- and on-Broadway), and starred in Larry Kramer's off-Broadway sequel to The Normal Heart, The Destiny of Me, for which he received an Obie Award and a Drama Desk nomination.

Mitchell's early television work includes guest-starring roles in Daybreak, MacGyver, Head of the Class, Law & Order, The Twilight Zone, Freddy's Nightmares, The Equalizer, Our House, The Dreamer of Oz: The L. Frank Baum Story, and The Stepford Children. He was a regular cast member on the 1996 Fox sitcom Party Girl, and was the long-running voice of Sydney, the animated kangaroo mascot of Dunkaroos snack cookies.

Starring and co-starring film roles include a homicidal new waver in Band of the Hand (1986), a Polish immigrant violinist in Misplaced (1990), and a teen Lothario poet in Book of Love (1990). Mitchell had a single line ("Delivery!") in Spike Lee's Girl 6 (1996) as a man auditioning for a pornographic film. Mitchell is a founding member of the Drama Department Theater Company, for which he adapted and directed Tennessee Williams' Kingdom of Earth starring Cynthia Nixon and Peter Sarsgaard.

=== Hedwig and the Angry Inch ===
In 1998, Mitchell wrote (collaborating with songwriter Stephen Trask) and starred in Hedwig and the Angry Inch, an Obie Award-winning off-Broadway rock musical about a genderqueer East German rock musician chasing after an ex-lover who plagiarized her songs.

Three years later, he wrote, directed and starred in the feature-film version of the play, for which he won Best Director at the 2001 Sundance Film Festival. Mitchell's performance was nominated for a Golden Globe for Best Actor in a Musical or Comedy, and he received 19 more awards for the film worldwide. Both the play and the film were critical hits and have spawned cult followings around the world.

The 2014 Broadway production of Hedwig starred Neil Patrick Harris and Lena Hall, was directed by Michael Mayer, and won four Tony Awards, including Best Actor in a Musical (Harris), Best Featured Actress in a Musical (Hall), and Best Revival of a Musical. Mitchell reprised his Hedwig performance during the run and received a 2015 Special Tony Award for his return to the role.

=== Shortbus ===
After the success of Hedwig, Mitchell expressed an interest in writing, directing, and producing a film that incorporated explicit sex in a naturalistic and thoughtful way, without using "stars." After three years of talent searches, improvisation workshops, and production, Shortbus premiered in May 2006 at the 2006 Cannes Film Festival. The film garnered many awards, at venues such as the Athens, Gijon, and Zurich International Film Festivals.

=== Rabbit Hole ===
He directed the 2010 film Rabbit Hole, starring Nicole Kidman (in an Oscar-nominated performance) and Aaron Eckhart, adapted from David Lindsay-Abaire's Pulitzer Prize-winning play of the same name about a couple dealing with the loss of their four-year-old son. Mitchell became interested in directing the project out of a personal connection to the story, having dealt with the death of his four-year-old brother as a teenager. The film debuted at the Toronto Film Festival.

=== Other work ===
Mitchell was the executive producer of the 2004 film Tarnation, a documentary about the life of Jonathan Caouette, whom he met when the latter auditioned for Shortbus. Tarnation won 2004 Best Documentary from the National Society of Film Critics and the BFI Sutherland Trophy for Best Debut. John directed videos for Bright Eyes' "First Day of My Life" (featuring Secret Garden co-star Alison Fraser) and the Scissor Sisters' "Filthy/Gorgeous"; the latter was banned from MTV Europe for its explicitly sexual content. In 2012, Mitchell wrote and produced a narrative short film for Sigur Rós entitled "Seraph", directed by animator Dash Shaw.

Mitchell has appeared as a pundit on Politically Incorrect and various VH1 and Independent Film Channel programs. He introduced films on a show called Escape From Hollywood on IFC for two years. He wrote and directed a number of short films and commercials for Dior including Lady Grey London and L.A.dy Dior both starring Marion Cotillard and Dior Homme Sport, starring Jude Law. In 2013, He wrote and directed a fashion video for Agent Provocateur titled "Insurrection". In 2016, Mitchell performed on Amanda Palmer and Jherek Bischoff: Strung Out In Heaven (A David Bowie Tribute).

Mitchell appeared as book editor David Pressler-Goings in seasons 2 and 3 of the HBO series Girls, and as Andy Warhol in HBO's Vinyl. Mitchell can be seen in the 2016 documentary Danny Says alongside Danny Fields, Alice Cooper and Iggy Pop. He has played a character based on Milo Yiannopoulos on The Good Fight, opposite Christine Baranski, and the choreographer Egon in season 4 of the Amazon Studios series Mozart in the Jungle opposite Gael García Bernal. In 2014, he directed an unaired pilot of the Showtime series Happyish, starring Philip Seymour Hoffman in his final role.

Mitchell's punk-era YA romance film How to Talk to Girls at Parties, starring Elle Fanning, Alex Sharp, and Nicole Kidman, was released by A24 in Spring 2018. He co-directed, with Mark A. Burkley, the episode "Mother of All Matches" of Netflix's GLOW (season 2, episode 4), which topped Entertainment Weekly's "The best TV episodes of 2018" list.

Mitchell was a series cast member in Hulu's Shrill, which stars Aidy Bryant and is based on Lindy West's memoir of the same title. In 2019, John wrote, starred and directed (and co-wrote songs with composer Bryan Weller) Anthem: Homunculus, a 5 1/2 hour musical podcast series co-starring Glenn Close, Patti Lupone, Cynthia Erivo, Denis O'Hare, Nakhane and Laurie Anderson. His latest scripted podcast series - Cancellation Island, co-written with Michael Cavadias, features a character played by Holly Hunter who opens a rehab for cancelled people—was released February 9, 2025. John is a regular cast member of the ongoing scripted podcast The Orbiting Human Circus (of the Air). In 2019, John and Portland-based band Eyelids recorded Turning Time Around, an album of Lou Reed covers produced by R.E.M.'s Peter Buck as a benefit for Mitchell's mother's Alzheimer's care.

Mitchell's "distance-defying, community-built benefit album" New American Dream (Parts 1 and 2) was released September 4, 2020, including collaborations with Ezra Furman, Justin Craig, Alynda Segarra of Hurray for the Riff Raff, Stephen Trask, Billy Hough, Amber Martin, Jamie Stewart of Xiu Xiu, Wynton Marsalis, Jeremiah Lloyd Harmon, Catherine Russell and Leland.

In 2022, he played Joe Exotic in Peacock's streaming series adaptation of the Wondery podcast series Joe vs. Carole, costarring Kate McKinnon. John co-wrote (with Brett Every) and sang a song from the point of view of the character, "Call Me Joe," featuring Nat Wolff as Joe's husband Travis Maldonado. That same year, he appeared in the Netflix series The Sandman as Hal Carter. He plays Amory (the "Demon Brother") on the Apple TV+ series City on Fire. He regularly tours with "Black Star Symphony" conceived by David Bowie collaborator Donny McCaslin, as well as John's all-David Bowie show "Queen Bitch," now entitled "I'm Afraid of Americans" (Bowie was an investor in the first Los Angeles Hedwig production).

In 2026, Mitchell joined Broadway's Oh, Mary! in the titular role, becoming the sixth person to play Mary Todd Lincoln. John is a former fellow of the Sundance Institute Filmmaker and Screenwriter Labs. For his work on queer rights he received the New York State Senate Democrats' 2004 Special Human Rights Award. He won the 2007 Dorothy Hirshon Award for Cinematic Achievement from New School University and the 2019 Excellence in Acting Award from the Provincetown Film Festival.

He is presently working on "L.S.M." a new play about French anti-Nazi Surrealist Claude Cahun, as well as films about Allen Ginsberg and AIDS activist Peter Staley. He is also completing a memoir for the Da Capo imprint entitled "A Heart Held Outside the Body" to be released in 2029

== Personal life ==
In 1985, at the age of 22, Mitchell came out as gay to his family and friends, then did so publicly in a 1992 New York Times profile. His subsequent writing has often explored sexuality and gender. He is a Radical Faerie, and his experiences with the group influenced the making of Shortbus. Along with Shortbus stars PJ DeBoy and Paul Dawson and performance artists Amber Martin and Angela Di Carlo, he is a co-founder and DJ of the long-running New York City monthly party "Mattachine," named after the early American gay rights organization Mattachine Society. In 2022, he stated he was nonbinary, clarifying later that the term "defines by what is it not"; therefore he prefers the term "androgynous" and continues to use he/him pronouns.

Mitchell presently splits his home life between Manhattan and New Orleans.

== Work ==
=== As director ===
==== Film ====
| Year | Title | Notes |
|---|---|---|
| 2001 | Hedwig and the Angry Inch | Also writer |
| 2006 | Shortbus | |
| 2010 | Rabbit Hole | |
| 2011 | Lady Grey London | Short film |
| 2011 | L.A.dy Dior | Short film |
| 2013 | Insurrection | Short film |
| 2017 | How to Talk to Girls at Parties | Also co-writer |

==== Television ====
| Year | Title | Notes |
|---|---|---|
| 2013 | Nurse Jackie | 1 episode: "Luck of the Drawing" |
| 2015 | Happyish | Unaired pilot |
| 2018 | GLOW | 1 episode: "Mother of All Matches" (co-director with Mark A. Burkley) |

==== Podcast ====
| Year | Title | Notes |
|---|---|---|
| 2019 | Anthem: Homunculus | Scripted musical audio drama |

=== As actor ===
==== Film ====
| Year | Title | Role | Notes |
|---|---|---|---|
| 1986 | Band of the Hand | J. L. | |
| 1986 | One More Saturday Night | Teenager No. 2 | |
| 1988 | Higher Education | Student No. 1 | |
| 1989 | No Holds Barred | Man in Audience | Uncredited |
| 1989 | Misplaced | Jacek | |
| 1990 | Book of Love | Floyd | |
| 1996 | Girl 6 | Rob | |
| 1997 | David Searching | Man with Fruit | |
| 1999 | I Remember | Joe | Short film |
| 2001 | Hedwig and the Angry Inch | Hedwig | Also director and writer |
| 2006 | Shortbus | Sextra | Uncredited |
| 2016 | My Entire High School Sinking into the Sea | Brent Daniels | Voice role in animated feature |
| 2025 | Lisbon | Martin | Short film, written and directed by Matthew Jacobs Morgan |

==== Television ====
| Year | Title | Role | Notes |
|---|---|---|---|
| 1984 | The Roommate | Calvin Fitch | Television film, produced by American Playhouse |
| 1986 | The Equalizer | Ed Donahue | 1 episode: "Unpunished Crimes" |
| 1986 | The Twilight Zone | Tom | 1 episode: "A Day in Beaumont/The Last Defender of Camelot" (appeared in second segment only) |
| 1986 | ABC Afterschool Specials | Friend at bus stop | 1 episode: "A Desperate Exit" |
| 1987 | The Stepford Children | Kenny | TV film |
| 1987 | MacGyver | Aaron Ryman | 1 episode: "Hell Week" |
| 1987–1990 | Head of the Class | Manfred Lutz | 3 episodes: "That'll Be the Day", "From Hair to Eternity: Part 1" and "From Hair to Eternity: Part 2" |
| 1988 | Our House | Willie Gillis | 1 episode: "Out of Step" |
| 1988 | Freddy's Nightmares | Bryan Ross | 1 episode: "It's a Miserable Life" |
| 1988 | A Friendship in Vienna | Tommi Lowberg | TV film |
| 1989 | Teach 109 | 1st Android | TV short |
| 1990 | The Dreamer of Oz: The L. Frank Baum Story | Albert the Reporter | Television film |
| 1993 | Daybreak | Lennie | Television film |
| 1993 | Class of '96 | Horace | 1 episode: "See You in September" |
| 1995 | Law & Order | Eddie | 1 episode: "Pride" |
| 1996 | Party Girl | Derrick | 4 episodes: "Pilot", "Virgin Mary", "Just Say No" and "A Charming Tale" |
| 1997 | Nothing Sacred | Matt Evans | 1 episode: "Speaking in Tongues" |
| 2013–2014 | Girls | David Pressler-Goings | 5 episodes: "Boys", "On All Fours", "Together", "Females Only" and "She Said OK" |
| 2016 | Vinyl | Andy Warhol | 3 episodes: "Yesterday Once More", "Whispered Secrets" and "Cyclone" |
| 2017–2022 | The Good Fight | Felix Staples | 5 episodes |
| 2018 | Mozart in the Jungle | Egon | 5 episodes |
| 2019–2021 | Shrill | Gabe | 22 episodes |
| 2021 | Santa Inc. | Dr. Almonds (voice) | 3 episodes |
| 2022 | Joe vs. Carole | Joe Exotic | 8 episodes |
| 2022 | The Sandman | Hal | 11 episodes |
| 2023 | Yellowjackets | Caligula | 1 episode: "Burial" |
| 2023 | City on Fire | Amory Gould | 8 episodes |

==== Podcasts ====
| Year | Title | Role | Notes |
|---|---|---|---|
| 2018–2020 | The Orbiting Human Circus (of the Air) | John Cameron | Voice role - fictional podcast series |
| 2019 | Anthem: Homunculus | Ceann Mackay | Scripted musical audio drama |
| 2021 | Hot White Heist | Orlov | Audible-exclusive podcast series |
| 2021 | The Cinnamon Bear: A Holiday Adventure | Grand Wonky | Podcast series |
| 2022 | The Laundronauts: A Potentially Untrue Tale Based on Actual Events | Absentia | Voice role and executive producer; series was written and directed by his younger brother, Colin Mackenzie Mitchell. |

== See also ==
- LGBT culture in New York City
- List of LGBT people from New York City
- NYC Pride March
