= John Trengove (director) =

South African filmmaker (born 1978)

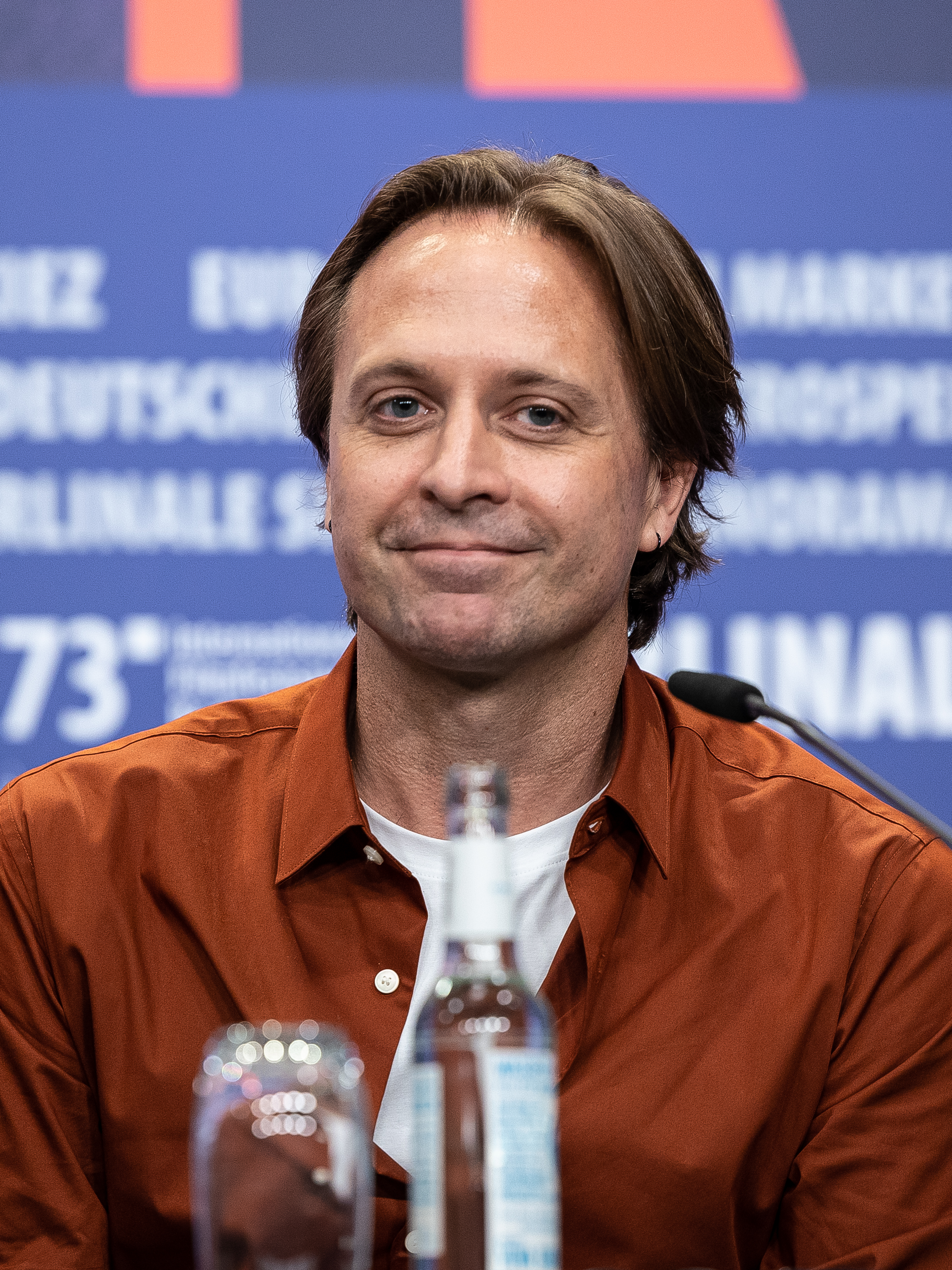
- Trengove at the Berlinale 2023
- Born: 21 March 1978 (age 48); Johannesburg, South Africa
- Education: New York University Tisch School of the Arts
- Occupation: Film director
- Father: Wim Trengove

John Trengove (born 21 March 1978) is a South African film director, known for The Wound (2017) and Manodrome (2023).

== Early life and education ==
John Trengove was born on 21 March 1978 in Johannesburg, the son of South African advocate Wim Trengove.

He attended the New York University Tisch School of the Arts.

== Career ==
In 2010, Trengove directed the miniseries Hopeville.

His short film, The Goat, premiered at the Berlinale 2014 and screened at over 40 film festivals worldwide. His debut feature film, The Wound, premiered at the Sundance Film Festival in 2017.

In 2023, Trengove wrote and directed Manodrome, starring Jesse Eisenberg, Adrien Brody and Odessa Young.

== Awards and nominations ==
Hopeville was nominated for an international Emmy and received the Rose d'Or for drama. It was also released as a 92-minute feature film. <!-WP:CITE IMDB ------>

The Wound won best feature at Frameline, Sarasota , Valencia, and Taipei Film Festivals.

== Personal life ==
As of 2018, Trengove divided his time between Johannesburg and São Paulo with his partner, Brazilian filmmaker Marco Dutra.

== Filmography ==
=== Feature films ===
Year	English Title	Original Title	Notes
2010	Hopeville		
2017	The Wound	Inxeba	
2023	Manodrome		
2026	The Smell of Apples	Die Reuk van Appels	Post-production

=== Television ===
- Hard Copy (3 episodes)
- The Lab (8 episodes)
- Bag of Plenty (12 episodes)
- Shuga (2 episodes)
- White Lies (4 episodes)
