= List of Punky Brewster episodes =

Punky Brewster is an American television series created by David W. Duclon. The series revolves around a girl named Punky Brewster (Soleil Moon Frye) being raised by her foster parent Henry Warnimont (George Gaynes). The show aired original episodes on NBC from September 16, 1984, to March 9, 1986, and again in first-run syndication from October 30, 1987, to May 27, 1988.

In the early part of season one, six fifteen-minute episodes were produced because the show had many young viewers and was scheduled after football games, which tended to run overtime. This was done rather than joining a full-length episode in progress, because that would disappoint children watching the program, and showing it later tended to put them up at a time parents may have considered too late for their children.

== Series overview ==
Season	Episodes	Originally released		
Season	Episodes	First released	Last released	Network
1	20	September 16, 1984	March 31, 1985	NBC
2	22	September 15, 1985	March 9, 1986	NBC
3	22	October 30, 1987	December 7, 1987	Syndication
4	22	April 27, 1988	May 27, 1988	Syndication

== Episodes ==
=== Season 1 (1984–85) ===
No. overall	No. in season	Title	Directed by	Written by	Original release date	Prod. code
1	1	"Punky Finds a Home, part 1"	Jack Shea	David W. Duclon	September 16, 1984	101
In Chicago, 8-year-old Penelope "Punky" Brewster (Soleil Moon Frye) and her dog Brandon are found living in an empty apartment by the apartment building's grumpy manager, 60-year-old Henry Warnimont (George Gaynes), who owns a photography studio. Henry invites Punky to his apartment for dinner. In Henry's apartment, Punky tells Henry that it all started when her father walked out on her and her mother Susan Brewster, and then a couple of weeks ago, Susan said they were going on a trip. Susan, Punky and Brandon piled up in their car and drove to a shopping center in Chicago, where Susan abandoned Punky and Brandon. Punky and Brandon have been homeless ever since. In the vacant apartment, Punky always had food that she could share with Brandon, because 8-year-old Cherie Johnson (Cherie Johnson), who lives upstairs from Henry with her grandmother Betty Johnson (Susie Garrett), always brought food to Punky. When Henry's search for Punky's mother is interrupted by a visit to his studio from Punky, Cherie and Betty, Henry takes some memorable pictures of Punky, Cherie, Betty, Brandon and himself at his photography studio, and Henry has his hands full with a customer named Agnes (Elizabeth Kerr), who has fallen for him. Later, Punky decides to clean Henry's apartment while he is out, but when Henry gets home, he is furious, because he liked everything the way it was before Punky cleaned the place. Henry is especially furious that Punky has put his late wife Claudia's picture out on the table in the living room, because years ago, Claudia died shortly after marrying Henry, and it still hurts Henry too much to look at that picture. Once Henry has finished yelling, he calms down and tells Punky that he is going to turn her over to the Department of Children and Family Services (DCFS). Punky decides to leave, thinking that she is a horrible person and that wherever she goes, no one wants her around. Henry spends three and a half hours looking for Punky, and when he returns to the apartment, he finds Punky in his apartment. She says she was not going anywhere, because it was raining outside, and she has decided to give Henry another chance to not be grumpy. Henry decides to let Punky spend the night in his apartment.
2	2	"Punky Finds a Home, part 2"	Art Dielhenn	Rick Hawkins & Liz Sage	September 23, 1984	102
On the next day, Henry tells Punky that he has called the DCFS, but a frantic Punky tells Henry that she doesn't want to go to an orphanage, so Henry promises Punky that she won't have to go to an orphanage. The DCFS sends inexperienced case worker Miranda "Randi" Mitchell (Talia Balsam), who takes Punky to Fenster Hall, a home for kids who are up for adoption. Randi later returns to Henry's apartment, and tells Henry that there has not been much progress in finding Punky's mother Susan, who may not want to be found. Randi also says that in 72 hours, the DCFS will have a hearing to decide who gets custody of Punky, and Punky said she would like for it to be Henry. Henry has shed a lot of his grouchiness, and he is now beginning to love Punky, and he would like to have custody of her. But Randi thinks Punky would be better off with someone else. At Fenster Hall, Punky is introduced to her two roommates: Lisa (Robyn Lively) is an older girl who acts tough, and Mary (Morgan Nagler) is a younger girl who never talks. Punky wants to escape from Fenster Hall and go back to Henry's apartment, but Lisa tells Punky that no one has ever gotten past Mr. Tyler (Robert DoQui), Fenster Hall's security guard. After Punky makes several failed attempts to escape, Punky and Lisa are at a loss for ideas, which prompts Mary to finally talk, and, based on a suggestion from Mary, they form an idea that works: Lisa and Mary trick Mr. Tyler into climbing out onto a window ledge, while Punky escapes.
3	3	"Punky Finds a Home, part 3"	Art Dielhenn	Carmen Finestra	September 30, 1984	103
An incredulous Henry demands to know why Randi feels he is unfit to be Punky's foster father, and her reasons are valid: he has never raised a child, he is unmarried, and he is elderly. While the two are still arguing, Punky returns to Henry's apartment, having broken free from Fenster Hall, and gets caught by Randi. Following Punky's talking to Henry about living with him, he vows to get custody of her at the hearing. After Punky is brought back to Fenster Hall, Randi introduces her to the Petersons (Mark L. Taylor and Donna Lynn Leavy), a childless couple. The Petersons are interested in becoming Punky's foster parents, but Punky convinces them to adopt Mary instead. Randi is disappointed that Punky thwarted her attempt to place Punky with the Petersons. Later, Randi has a change of heart, and represents Henry and Punky at the custody hearing. The State, represented by attorney Lois Dent (Allyn Ann McLerie), who proves to be annoying, voices its objections to the custody, and Judge William J. Murphy (J. A. Preston) agrees, ruling in favor of the State. Randi asks the court to reconsider, asking Punky to read aloud a letter she originally wrote to Henry in case custody was denied. Judge Murphy changes his mind, allowing Henry to go through the licensing procedures to become a foster father.
4a	4a	"Lost and Found"	Art Dielhenn	Neil Lebowitz	October 7, 1984	104B
One morning at breakfast, Punky discovers that there is no cereal or milk, so she convinces Henry to go to the supermarket. While there, Henry sees an old friend named Bud (Bill Wiley), while Punky samples some pizza. Henry follows Bud, who works at the supermarket, into the store's back room. This causes Punky to panic, when she does not see Henry, and she searches the store frantically. After failing to find Henry, she assumes that he abandoned her, just like her mother did. A frantic Henry arrives home and finds Punky packing. She explains to Henry how she thought he had abandoned her. Having been worried sick himself when he could not find Punky, Henry promises that he will never abandon her.
4b	4b	"Punky Gets Her Own Room"	Art Dielhenn	Neil Lebowitz	October 7, 1984	104A
Punky wants her own bedroom instead of having to sleep on the couch every night. However, Henry is reluctant to give up the only available room, his study, and all he will give is a maybe, citing the time and money it takes. With the help of Cherie and building superintendent Eddie Malvin (Eddie Deezen), Punky changes Henry's study into what Henry describes as a room so colorful, it "would blind a Smurf". Disappointed about losing his study, Henry eventually accepts the new room, because he understands that Punky needs something to call her own.
5a	5a	"Walk Pool"	Art Dielhenn	David W. Duclon	October 14, 1984	105A
Punky and her energetic friends are running circles around Betty every morning when she walks them to school. Scotty Lotabucci (R. J. Williams), the terror of the group, even leaves a "kick me" sign on Betty's lower back. On a bet with Betty that Henry can handle the kids better than she can, Henry ends up with the job of walking them to and from school for one day, and he regrets it. Although he does not do much better than Betty did, the kids seem to like him enough.
5b	5b	"Gone Fishing"	Art Dielhenn	Rick Hawkins & Liz Sage	October 14, 1984	105B
A bored Punky interrupts Henry's attempt at a quiet weekend afternoon, so, after telling her about a fish called "Big Al", Henry decides to introduce Punky and her friends to the joys of fishing. They are not exactly thrilled, but Punky's glad for the opportunity, and a lucky streak at the end provides some fun anyway.
6	6	"Take Me out to the Ballgame"	Art Dielhenn	David W. Duclon and Rick Hawkins and Liz Sage	October 21, 1984	109
Desperate to see a National League Championship Series baseball game between the Chicago Cubs and the San Diego Padres, at Wrigley Field, Henry tries everything to get tickets to the game for him and Punky. After Henry fails through various means, including a radio station contest, Eddie suggests that he buy the tickets from a scalper and introduces him to Lenny the Loop (Art Metrano). After Punky bargains down the price that Lenny originally offers, Henry buys the tickets for $100. He and Punky find out later, from two nuns sitting in their seats at Wrigley, that the tickets are 100 years old. With Punky and Henry unable to secure seats in the stadium, Punky talks the Cubs players into letting her and Henry watch the game from their dugout.
7	7	"Parents Night"	Art Dielhenn	David Titcher	October 28, 1984	107
Punky's rich friend Margaux Kramer tells Punky that foster parents do not love their kids as much as biological parents love their kids. Punky sticks up for Henry, but she is later told that Henry cannot make it to Parent's Night at school—Henry has to shoot pictures of Brandon for a dog food advertisement, because Henry feels the need to increase his income so he'll always be able to give Punky everything she needs. Punky tells Betty what Margaux said, and before leaving to take Punky and Cherie to Parent's Night, Betty goes to Henry's studio and tells Henry what Margaux told Punky. Betty sets Henry straight, and Henry feels bad about missing some of Parent's Night. At Parent's Night, Punky starts to believe Margaux's theory about foster parents not caring as much as biological parents do, but Margaux is proven wrong when Henry shows up at Parent's Night after all.: Recording date: September 21, 1984
8a	8a	"Go to Sleep"	Art Dielhenn	Joe Fisch	November 4, 1984	106B
Henry tries like crazy to get Punky to go to sleep, on the one night when Punky is not sleepy. She eventually figures out that Henry wants to watch Die Fledermaus on PBS, but Henry is forced to relent and tries to teach Punky the ins and outs of opera.
8b	8b	"A Visit to the Doctor"	Art Dielhenn	Joe Fisch	November 4, 1984	106A
At Punky and Henry's apartment, Punky and Cherie are forging notes to give to the school nurse, saying that they do not need their booster shot. When Henry and Betty get home, they find and read the notes. Punky is scared to get her booster shot because she's afraid it will hurt too much, so Henry lends her the "magic nickel" that his father gave to him when he was a kid. At the doctor's office, while Punky's getting a drink of water, the magic nickel falls down the water fountain's drain. Punky is scared that Henry will be mad, and she is again scared of her booster shot, now that she doesn't have the nickel anymore. While Punky is getting her shot, the receptionist tells Henry that Punky lost "some sort of magic nickel". Punky is brave and gets her booster shot. She tells Henry that she lost his magic nickel, and she's surprised when he doesn't get angry about it. She also tells Henry how she was brave without the nickel, and that he can also be brave without the nickel.
9	9	"Miss Adorable"	Art Dielhenn	Jim Evering & Dorothy Van	November 25, 1984	113
During a sleepover, Margaux tells Punky and Cherie that she enters beauty pageants because she wants her parents to be able to brag about her to their friends, and she wants them to be proud of her. Punky thinks that is why her mother Susan abandoned her, because she never made Susan proud of her, so Punky decides to not make the same mistake with Henry. Cherie, Margaux, and Punky enter the Miss Adorable Pageant, hosted by Andy Gibb (Playing as himself). In the talent round of the pageant, Margaux sings "I Enjoy Being a Girl", while her mother sings along in the wings, Cherie does a magic trick and Punky does pet tricks with Brandon, who doesn't really want to do any tricks. As it turns out, Cherie wins the pageant, and while Punky is happy for Cherie, Punky is sad that she let Henry down. Henry assures Punky that she doesn't have to win a pageant to make him proud of her.
10	10	"Dog Dough Afternoon"	Art Dielhenn	Teleplay by : Neil Lebowitz; Story by : Fred Shafferman	December 2, 1984	112
Punky gets a new rain coat, and then Punky overhears Henry and Betty talking about how much money it takes to raise a child. Punky wants to help out, so she goes to the nearby Midvale Bank and Trust to try to get a loan. Oliver Green (Earl Boen), the bank's vice president, won't give Punky a loan, but he does give her the idea of starting a dog grooming business as a way to earn money. Punky, Cherie and Allen start a dog grooming business in the apartment. Later, when Henry gets home, he sees the canine customers. When Punky tells Henry what she heard him and Betty talking about, Henry appreciates that Punky was trying to help by earning money, and is glad that she has taken some responsibility, but he assures Punky that she does not have to worry about money, because Henry will always make sure Punky has everything she needs.
11	11	"Bye Bye, My"	Art Dielhenn	Gary Kott	December 9, 1984	108
After a messy search in Punky's bedroom, Punky's favorite doll (named "My") is missing its head again, thanks to Brandon. Following Punky, Cherie and Allen's unsuccessful attempt at repairing the doll, Henry promises Punky, reluctantly, that he will repair it himself, but after Betty convinces him that Punky needs a new one, he throws the doll away instead. An upset Punky reminds Henry about how important the doll is to her so he goes searching for it at the city dump. When Henry returns, he tries to fool Punky into believing that he found and repaired "My", but he ends up confessing that he could not find "My" once Punky knew it was a completely new doll. Seeing her unhappy, Henry demands to know why "My" was so important, and Punky tells him that her mother Susan gave her that doll, leading Henry to apologize. Punky accepts his apology and decides to keep the new doll, naming it Henrietta (after Henry).
12	12	"Yes, Punky, There Is a Santa Claus"	Art Dielhenn	Carmen Finestra & Gary Menteer	December 16, 1984	110–111
It is getting close to a very special day: Punky and Henry's first Christmas together, but Punky is saddened that it will be her first Christmas without her mother Susan. When Henry tells Punky about some of his childhood memories of Christmas, Punky tells him that she misses Susan. At school, a bully named Billy Bahootsas (Danny Ponce) tells Punky and her friends that there is no Santa Claus, and after Punky gets home from school, Henry tells Punky that Santa is real and can do anything, but Punky is still not convinced, and neither is Cherie. While Punky and Cherie are out of earshot, Henry tells Betty that there has to be a way to convince them, which gives Betty an idea: Betty tells Henry that the school is having an awful hard time trying to find someone to play as Santa for Punky's class, and Betty suggests that Henry be Santa for Punky's class. With a little coaxing from Betty, a reluctant Henry agrees. At the school, Santa shows up at Punky's class, and none of the kids know that it is really Henry. When it is Punky's turn to talk to Santa, she asks Santa for just one precious gift: her mother, Susan. Later, at the photography studio, as Betty helps Henry out of the Santa suit, Henry vows to find Susan. Henry begins his search for Susan. After Punky puts a gift under the tree for Susan, Henry's detective friend Gene Doucette calls, giving Henry a promising lead that there is a woman named Susan who is in the hospital suffering from exposure, and she fits Susan Brewster's description. Henry heads to the hospital, and it turns out that she's not Susan Brewster—it is comically hinted that she is a prostitute. While Henry is on his way home, a blizzard sidetracks him on Michigan Avenue at Nick's Nook, an antiques store run by an old man named Nick (Iggy Wolfington), and there is something about Nick—especially since this is the part of Chicago that Henry was raised in, and Henry does not remember Nick's Nook ever existing on Michigan Avenue. Nick tells Henry that miracles can happen, and he offers to give Henry a free jewelry box for Punky, but Henry turns it down. On Christmas morning, Punky wakes up, and she can't find her mother in the apartment...but when she opens her gifts, she notices a gift that wasn't there before. It is from Santa, and it is the jewelry box that Nick tried to give Henry. Punky knows it is Susan's jewelry box, because Susan's initials are on it. Also, Punky's gift to Susan is missing. Punky understands that Susan could not be there, so Santa took the gift to Susan and left the jewelry box for Punky, who has a great Christmas after all. On a hunch, Henry calls information, and he asks for the phone number of Nick's Nook, but he's told that Nick's Nook doesn't exist. Henry is now convinced that Nick was Santa.
13	13	"Play It Again, Punky" "Punky In The Record Business"	Art Dielhenn	Barry Vigon	January 20, 1985	120
Hip young music teacher Tony Glen (Andy Gibb) succeeds where Henry has failed—teaching Punky how to play the piano. Tony's contemporary approach wows Punky, and leaves Henry feeling out of touch with Punky's generation. While teaching Punky, Tony performs an original creation of his. After receiving compliments from Punky, Tony decides to record his music for release with the help of recording executive Lonnie Dell (Peter Elbling), the owner of a record company known as Dell Star, but it turns out that Mr. Dell is a crook. When Tony auditions, Mr. Dell says he will cancel a recording session with Prince, and work with Tony for $2,500 cash. A suspicious Henry auditions—after secretly turning Mr. Dell's intercom on so Tony and Punky can hear it—and Mr. Dell says exactly the same thing to Henry that he said to Tony, and this proves that Mr. Dell likes to take advantage of people's dreams and con people out of their money. Henry still feels out of touch with Punky's generation, but Punky assures Henry that he is fine just the way he is, and a grateful Tony agrees to give Punky some free piano lessons.: Recording date: December 21, 1984
14	14	"Henry Falls in Love, part 1"	Art Dielhenn	Christine Houston	January 27, 1985	114
Punky is hoping for a complete family when Henry is reunited with his high school sweetheart Maggie McLerie (Allyn Ann McLerie), who is now one of the richest people in Chicago and a widow. Punky feels bad that their courtship went nowhere, as shortly after their first date, Pearl Harbor was attacked and Henry joined the US Navy to aid in the war effort, and lost touch with Maggie. Punky eagerly sets up a re-creation of their last date to help Henry out, and it works, as Henry proposes. Punky's hopes begin to fade when Henry and Maggie get into an argument over Punky: if Maggie and Henry get married, Maggie wants to put Punky in a boarding school so Maggie and Henry can travel the world, but Henry is against the idea of putting Punky in a boarding school (at least not without her approval). Punky decides to leave and take Brandon with her so she won't be in the way of Henry and Maggie's marriage.
15	15	"Henry Falls in Love, part 2"	Art Dielhenn	Carmen Finestra	February 3, 1985	115
Running away so Henry and Maggie can get married, Punky says goodbye to Cherie, planning to go out west. Henry and Maggie soon discover Punky's disappearance, and all other plans are quickly put aside to search for her. As for Punky herself, she comes close to succumbing to the cold before Brandon discovers a junkyard shack. Punky suspects that it is a little too well set up to be abandoned, and she is right, as its occupant soon makes himself known. Teenager Zach (Meeno Peluce), a runaway himself, doesn't understand Punky's reasons for running away at all, and after she falls asleep, he goes to a pay phone and uses the phone number on Brandon's dog tag to alert Henry and Maggie. Henry and Maggie arrive and announce that the marriage won't happen after all, and they convince Zach to go back home to his family.
16	16	"My Aged Valentine"	Art Dielhenn	Jim Evering	February 10, 1985	121
Valentine's Day is approaching, and everyone seems excited, except for Punky, who is not too pleased with the attention she has been getting from her classmate Conrad (Chad Allen). Punky's attitude, that she does not want a boyfriend for Valentine's Day, leads her to punch Conrad in the eye after he kisses her. Warned by Margaux that not wanting a boyfriend for Valentine's Day means a lifetime of loneliness, Punky has a dream in which she is 88 years old and still living with 140-year-old Henry while everyone else has married. Then when Henry and Brandon leave with their significant others, Punky is old and alone. After Punky wakes up, Henry assures her that it was just a dream, and Punky decides that Henry will be her Valentine this year.
17	17	"I Love You, Brandon"	Art Dielhenn	Neil Lebowitz	February 17, 1985	116
Henry, who collects stamps, buys a rare set of stamps called the "Crowned Heads of Europe", and Brandon swallows them, making Henry absolutely furious. Punky takes Brandon out for a walk to let Henry calm down, and while Henry is placing calls, trying to find another set of the "Crowned Heads of Europe" stamps, Brandon is hit by a car that Brandon is pushing Punky out of the way of. Punky and Henry each blame themselves for it, and a veterinarian named Dr. Frankel, who has diagnosed Brandon as having a severe concussion and a broken leg, tries to save Brandon's life, but recommends that the only option is putting Brandon to sleep. Punky befriends Mrs. Carney, whose dog Angus is in Dr. Frankel's animal hospital too. Angus dies, and Mrs. Carney, who is devastated, turns down Punky and Henry's offer to take her home, preferring to walk home instead. Punky gives her a hug before she leaves. Brandon survives his injuries, and he goes home with a cast on one of his legs. Henry has built a new dog house to put in Punky's bedroom for Brandon.
18	18	"Punky Brewster's Workout"	Art Dielhenn	Barry Vigon	February 24, 1985	117
Henry expands his photography business with new capital, a VCR and camcorder. Punky's friends are at her home while Henry is away and they are bored. Punky suggests making a short film, and Allen agrees to direct. They use Henry's new camcorder, despite Henry's instruction that it is fragile and Punky is not supposed to use it when Henry is not home. While Allen records, Cherie, Margaux & Punky change into their leotards and do an exercise video like Jane Fonda's. After they make the video, Punky and Allen fight over the camcorder, and they end up accidentally dropping it, putting a crack in the lens. When Henry returns home, he drops the camcorder and remarks to himself he needs to buy a new lens and he cannot believe how clumsy he is. Later that night, Punky is feeling guilty and decides to tell Henry that she and Allen broke the camcorder, not him, which Henry admits he knew about. Punky agrees to work off the cost of the lens, but is still unsure how Henry knew until he remarks she has the makings of a good aerobics instructor.
19	19	"Gals and Dolls"	Art Dielhenn	Jim Evering and Neil Lebowitz	March 3, 1985	118
On the morning after a sleepover, Punky, Cherie and Margaux are greeted with the news that Dollyland has received a new shipment of "Butter Lettuce Babies" dolls. Henry goes to buy three "Butter Lettuce Babies" dolls—one each for Punky, Cherie and Margaux—but he is only able to get the last one in the store. After Punky's name is the one that's drawn out of Henry's hat, the doll is given to Punky. That leads to a feud between Henry, Betty and Mrs. Kramer, while Margaux encourages Cherie to go along with her and ignore Punky, who feels deeply hurt by that treatment. Henry and Betty realize that if they cannot get along and be good examples for their kids, then their kids cannot get along, so Henry and Betty end their feud and become friends again, and then they help Punky, Cherie and Margaux do the same. They come up with a solution: Punky, Cherie and Margaux can take turns keeping the doll for a week at a time so they can each have the doll.
20	20	"Fenster Hall"	Art Dielhenn	Rick Hawkins & Liz Sage & David W. Duclon	March 31, 1985	119, 122
A masked boy goes in through Punky's window and steals her jewelry box, prompting her to follow in pursuit as that was the last possession of hers that was owned by her mother. The trail ends at an abandoned house, when the boy, T.C. Finestra (Billy Lombardo), unmasks and presents his findings to an older street thug who calls himself Blade (James LeGros). Blade takes care of T.C. — but only if T.C. steals things for him. Blade opens Punky's jewelry box, only to discover school supplies and a few trinkets, and angrily remarks to T.C. how hard he works to provide for him, and that he'd better get his act together by stealing more expensive items, and then Blade stomps off. Punky, who has gotten her jewelry box back, feels for T.C. and invites him back for supper at her place, where Henry decides that T.C. should go to Fenster Hall. Henry gives T.C an ultimatum: either he can be dragged out kicking & screaming or he can accompany Henry in a civilized manner, but either way he is headed to Fenster Hall, prompting T.C. to be cooperative with Henry and Punky. Mike Fulton, Fenster Hall’s head caseworker for boys, is helpful, but T.C. tires quickly of Fenster Hall, so he escapes and goes back to Blade. Blade smugly praises T.C. for fleeing Fenster Hall and remarks that he is returning. When T.C. is perplexed that Blade actually wants T.C. back there, Blade says it is because he knows Fenster Hall has advertised an upcoming auction, presenting the chance for a juicy larceny. T.C. returns to Fenster Hall to begin the plan to steal the money. T.C. still isn't much for the place, merely planning to do the job and get out, and the other boys remark how his attitude stinks. Mike, who has been trying to keep the peace, manages to get the group calm enough to get T.C. to talk. T.C. opens up to Mike, and gives up his tough guy act. T.C. tells Mike and the others that his mother died when he was born, and his father descended into alcoholism, drug abuse and constantly shouting at T.C. for "killing" Mrs. Finestra. Mike tells T.C. that Mr. Finestra was wrong to blame him for his mother's death. There were worse problems, T.C. had lived in a trailer park and his father drifted from one menial job to another, constantly proving an unreliable employee and poor breadwinner. One day, T.C. came home from school to find an empty spot where his trailer once stood, with no sign of his home, or his father, causing T.C. to break down in tears. Mike says that it is grueling for a young boy to deal with, but attacking others or blaming himself for his father's misdeeds is unhealthy. Later, the auction starts, and Betty and Henry bid against each other for the birdhouse that T.C. made. After the auction, T.C. steals the metal cash box, ready to give it to Blade. However, when alone, T.C. thinks to himself how immoral it is, and realizes that Fenster Hall cares more about him than Blade. Blade unexpectedly shows up at Fenster Hall to get the money from T.C., who begs Blade that he will go back with him and steal, but to leave Fenster Hall alone. Blade gets into a tirade about how he cared for T.C. when no else would, causing T.C. to retort that is a lie; Mike cares about T.C., while Blade guilt-tripped T.C. into committing robberies. Mike appears, saying Blade can have the money but not T.C., and Blade attacks Mike with his knife. Mike defends himself and Blade retreats with the cashbox, but not before giving Mike a gash. T.C., impressed that Mike put himself in harm's way for T.C., says that he will try to follow Mike's ways from now on. The kids are glad that T.C. is OK, not caring about the stolen cashbox. T.C. appreciates it, but says that he removed the cash from the box before Blade showed up, and Fenster Hall cheers. Later, Punky tells Henry that the police arrested Blade at the hospital, where Blade was being treated for a broken toe—Blade opened the box, and when he saw that there was nothing in the box, he got so angry that he threw it down, and it hit his toe.: Recording date: March 08, 1985

=== Season 2 (1985–86) ===
No. overall	No. in season	Title	Directed by	Written by	Original release date	Prod. code
21	1	"The K.O. Kid"	Art Dielhenn	Gary Menteer	September 15, 1985	205
On career day at school, teacher Mike Fulton's friend, boxer Marvelous Marvin Hagler (as himself), comes to Punky's class and talks about boxing. At lunch time, the school's most feared bully, Melanie "Moose" McGurk (Amy Dolan), looks at the lunches of Punky's friends to take what she wants, but Punky won't let Moose take hers, so Moose takes Punky into the restroom and beats Punky up. Punky wants to stand up to Moose, so Marvin trains Punky to be a boxer. In the end, Marvin tells Punky that she can't box very well. Later, Moose and Punky are preparing to fight behind the apartment building. Moose pushes Punky down a couple of times, and Cherie tells Moose that if she fights Punky, Moose will have to fight Cherie as well. And then all the other kids tell Moose that if she fights Cherie, she'll have to fight all of them. Moose gets nervous and says that she can't fight everyone at the same time, so Moose runs home and vows to leave Punky alone from now on. Punky and her friends celebrate their victory over Moose.
22	2	"Punky's Treehouse"	Art Dielhenn	Jim Evering	September 22, 1985	204
Punky has a dream that inspires her to plan to build a tree house in the tree behind the apartment building. When Henry, Betty and the gang pull out of Punky's plan to build the tree house, she thinks that her dream will never come true. However, Punky and Mike use a little psychology to motivate the gang into helping, and the tree house is built, with a lot of different colors of paint being used.
23	3	"Cheaters Never Win"	Art Dielhenn	Barry Vigon	September 29, 1985	201
Punky gets a D in geography on her report card. A big geography test is coming up, and while studying with Allen, Cherie and Margaux, Punky just cannot seem to name the fifty American states nor their capitals. Allen says he's going to take the easy way out, and cheat by writing the answers all over his body. When the time comes for the test, Punky is stumped. When she sees Allen using the answers that he wrote all over his body, she cheats as well by reading the answers off of him. Punky and Allen are the only kids in the class to receive perfect scores on the test. Mike thinks that his tests are not enough of a challenge for Punky and Allen, so he gives them extra work. Allen and Punky decide to work hard on this assignment, naming unique facets of every state, and on their next test they earn As. When report card time comes, Punky is surprised her grade is a C. Mike says he wondered about Allen and Punky's furtiveness during the first test, and realized they cheated. As punishment, he gave them Fs for the first test. However, the second test was an A fair and square, thus both tests averaged to a C. Mike also tells Punky it is up to Henry to determine her punishment, as he will be wondering why she got a low grade after so much studying. Henry is furious at Punky for cheating, but decides on a light punishment seeing how she learned that cheaters never prosper and all she learned from her extra work.
24	4	"Baby Buddies, Inc"	Art Dielhenn	Stephanie Mathison	October 6, 1985	206
Punky and Cherie want to open a babysitting service so they can earn enough money to buy Betty a birthday gift, and Henry reluctantly lets Punky be involved in it as long as Betty is the supervisor of the service. Punky and Cherie end up mixing up two babies, giving Mrs. Rafer's baby to Mrs. Darney (Cathy Silvers) and giving Mrs. Darney's baby to Mrs. Rafer (Lillian Lehman). After solving the problem, Punky and Cherie end the babysitting service and give Betty a gift that they made for her: a dress on which they accidentally sewed 4 pairs of sleeves.
25	5	"Tap Your Troubles Away"	Art Dielhenn	Dorothy Van	October 13, 1985	207
When it comes to tap dancing, Punky dances like she has two left feet, so she decides to quit tap dancing class so she can keep from being embarrassed, especially after Jersey Janet (Gretchen Wyler), the instructor, calls her a klutz. Henry, who looks like he's falling for Jersey Janet, helps her find a role for Punky in a recital that the class has been preparing for: wearing a bee costume and swinging over the other students, who are dressed as flowers in the recital.
26	6	"The Perils of Punky, part 1"	Art Dielhenn	David W. Duclon	October 20, 1985	202
Punky and her friends are on a camping trip with Henry and Betty at Lake Waxahatchie, and Punky and her friends get lost in the woods while they're collecting wood for a campfire. While Henry and Betty are searching for them, Punky and her friends decide to seek shelter in an old Indian cave, where they sit around a fire as Punky tells a ghost story. The cave proves to be not quite abandoned, and the inhabitants divine that Punky is the successor to Princess Moon, who has been foretold to defeat the evil Owa Tagool Iam. After Punky and the gang are sent off deeper into the cave, their first look at what the evil spirit can do is horrifying to them.: Recording date: August 09, 1985
27	7	"The Perils of Punky, part 2"	Art Dielhenn	David W. Duclon	October 20, 1985	203
The evil spirit (portrayed in physical form by Kedric Wolfe and voiced by David W. Duclon) conducts a campaign of fear through giant spiders, disappearing friends, and other things. Soon, only Punky is left, all of the others having vanished. The spirit attacks, but Princess Moon (played by Soleil Moon Frye in a dual role) appears and reveals the weak point of his attack; it only affects those who fear it. Punky forces him to feel the positive emotions of the world, and the spirit dies, bringing everyone back from vanishment. Betty and Henry find Punky and the gang sitting around the fire. Punky winds up her story, and they head back to camp with Henry and Betty, but not before one last goodbye from Princess Moon.
28	8	"Just Say No"	Art Dielhenn	Rick Hawkins	October 27, 1985	208
Punky and Cherie are playing in the backyard when a girls' club called "the Chicklets" show up. They say they love Punky's fashion sense and her tree house. They also explain to Punky and Cherie how being part of a club "is like everything." Punky invites them up to her tree house, and the Chicklets ask Punky and Cherie if they'd like to be a part of the Chicklets. The Chicklets want to make them members so they can use Punky's tree house for meetings. On the next day, Punky and Cherie say the pact to get into the club, and the Chicklets want to celebrate it by doing drugs. Punky and Cherie say maybe another time. Punky goes to Mike and asks him what to do. Mike hands Punky a book for the "Just Say No" club, and tells Punky about the club. On the next day, when the Chicklets pressure Punky and Cherie to do drugs, Punky tells the Chicklets about the "Just Say No" club. Chicklets member Kate (Stefanie Ridel), who is fed up with Chicklets leader Emily (Jennifer George), wants to join the "Just Say No" club with Punky. At the end of the episode, Soleil Moon Frye is shown participating in a "Just Say No" march in Atlanta, Georgia.
29	9	"The Search"	Art Dielhenn	Rick Hawkins and David W. Duclon	November 10, 1985	209
Punky's feeling a little depressed because Mike has assigned her and her classmates to each work on their family tree. It's making Punky want her mother Susan back in her life. When Mike has a talk with Punky in the tree house, Mike tells Punky something surprising: Mike was born on November 23, 1955, and his mother gave him up for adoption when he was just a few days old, and he was never adopted, so he grew up in Fenster Hall. That inspires Punky and Mike to help each other search for their mothers. After six weeks of searching, Henry finally gets a lead on Mike's mother...and it leads him right to the phone number of Mike's mother Lois Collins (Janet MacLachlan), who is less than thrilled. Punky gets herself into a position to figure out more from Lois, finding out that she was 16 years old when Mike was born. Years after Lois gave Mike up, she moved on to have another family. Punky makes a plea for Mike based on her own experiences, and while Lois doesn't take it well at first, Mike soon gets a visit to his classroom for a joyful reunion with Lois. The fact that Mike has been happily united with Lois delights Punky, who feels thankful that Henry found her and took her in after her mother Susan abandoned her a year ago. (Note: In the opening of the episode, Punky encounters a teacher, played by Peyton B. Rutledge, while running down the stairs. She is the real-life Penelope "Punky" Brewster, whom then-NBC programming chief Brandon Tartikoff had a crush on as a child. He had her tracked down and gotten legal permission to use her name, then she was given a cameo appearance and royalties.)
30	10	"Love Thy Neighbor"	Art Dielhenn	Carl Binder	November 17, 1985	210
On Halloween, Punky tries to play a practical joke on elderly neighbour Isabelle Peavy (Fran Ryan) as revenge for the way she treated Punky, Cherie, and Allen. Isabelle is a mean old lady, and Punky's friends think Isabelle is actually a witch. When Isabelle sees Punky trying to play the "flying foamie" trick on her, Isabelle takes Punky inside her apartment, and a terrified Punky runs back out, unintentionally leaving Brandon behind in Isabelle's apartment...and Isabelle may not want to give Brandon back. Punky gets Mike to go to Isabelle's apartment to get Brandon, and Isabelle explains to Mike the reason why she's so mean...because of something that happened years ago. Isabelle absolutely loved dancing. 12 years ago, while Isabelle was on her way to the Starland Ballroom to do some dancing, a kid on a bicycle collided with her, and didn't even stop. Ever since then, because of the resulting hip injury, Isabelle hasn't been able to dance, and she has hated kids ever since that day. Now, Isabelle becomes angry at Mike's attempts to offer some help to her, and she shows Mike and Brandon out of her apartment. Mike tells Punky what Isabelle told him, and Punky now wants to be Isabelle's friend. Punky, Mike, and Brandon later go back to Isabelle's apartment, but she's not answering her door, which is unusual for her. Mike kicks the door in...and they see Isabelle laying on the floor, obviously in pain. Isabelle explains that she fell, and that her hip hurts. Isabelle is rushed to the hospital, where she undergoes hip replacement surgery, and after she recovers, she's able to dance again. Realizing that her life was saved by a child, Isabelle rediscovers herself, and apologizes for being so mean. Then she takes Henry out dancing.
31	11	"The Gift"	Art Dielhenn	Rick Hawkins	November 24, 1985	212
The school's new cleaning lady, Linda (Bonnie Urseth), is a sweet, dedicated worker who is mentally challenged. Mike admires her spirit and Punky mentions how unfair it is that people like Linda sometimes get mistreated by other people. Mike teaches his class about classical music and plays a recording of the violin solo from "Träumerei" by Robert Schumann. Linda, who was in the hallway, tries to picture herself performing and follows along, but her impersonation is spotted by Allen, who laughs uproariously at her and leads the class in jokes of "Linda, the Amazing Spray Bottle Musician". Enraged, Mike disciplines Allen by assigning him a three-page report on the Special Olympics, while Punky seeks out a mortified Linda by saying Punky herself did some "dumb stuff" too. Linda says it is more than being foolish, she believes she is limited by life. The next day, Mike is setting up some musical instruments for a lesson when a conversation with Linda reveals that she may have a greater gift for music than even she realizes. Later that day, Mike brings in a person to play a violin solo...it's Linda, who plays for the class the solo from the previous day.
32	12	"Milk Does a Body Good"	Art Dielhenn	Charles Cilona & Reva Rose	December 1, 1985	211
Henry invites new neighbors Richard Whitney (James Staley) and his daughter Julie (Candace Cameron) over for dinner. Punky, Cherie, and Julie are making a cake for after dinner when they see Julie's picture on the back of a milk carton, which says that her real name is Jennifer Bates, and that she went missing from Lawrence, Kansas. Jennifer runs to her apartment and shows Richard the milk carton. The next thing Richard knows, Jennifer has run away, but Richard refuses to let anyone call the cops. Punky finds Jennifer in the tree house. Jennifer's mad at her father, but Punky tells Jennifer how lucky she is to have him. She then comes back in with Punky, and asks Richard why her picture was on the milk carton. Richard admits that after he and Jennifer's mother Roberta got divorced, she got custody of Jennifer and had cruelly been trying to cut Richard's visitation rights as much as possible in an effort to hurt Richard by keeping him out of Jennifer's life, and Richard loves Jennifer too much to be kept out of her life. Richard knew that Roberta and her new husband were planning to move to the west coast, meaning he would hardly ever get to see Jennifer again, and he ran off with Jennifer so he could stay in her life. Richard decides to call Roberta and tell her where Jennifer is.
33	13	"Christmas Shoplifting"	Art Dielhenn	Neil Lebowitz and Jim Evering	December 15, 1985	214
Misled by schoolmate Richmond Matzie (Peter Billingsley), Punky shoplifts a cashmere scarf for Henry as a Christmas gift, and unknowingly switches bags with Mike, resulting in an innocent Mike being put in jail. Punky and Henry get Mike out when Punky explains everything. Henry grounds Punky for a month, with no TV for 2 weeks, and her punishment is to have a job during a Christmas sale at the mall.
34	14	"Urban Fear"	Art Dielhenn	Jim Evering and Neil Lebowitz	January 5, 1986	215
A report appears on the TV news about the Northside Stalker, a serial killer in the area who has claimed seven victims so far. Betty and Henry discuss the situation a bit, with Henry telling her to keep it down so the girls don't hear them talking about it. The girls already know, however, and Punky starts to fear for Henry's life, especially when another victim is claimed. Henry remains committed to keeping calm, but Punky is drawing some disturbing pictures in art class and trying everything in the book to keep Henry away from night work at the studio. Henry assures Punky that it's okay to be afraid, but it's not healthy to let her fear completely take over everything she ever does. Henry also assures Punky that he does not intend to let anyone get him.
35	15	"Girls Will Be Boys"	Art Dielhenn	Cheryl Alu	January 12, 1986	213
Henry comes home from his Benevolent Order of Buffalo meeting with a package for Punky that she won in a drawing sponsored by Sandit's Hobby and Game Shop. It's a remote-controlled race car. Apparently, with a nickname like Punky, Sandit's Hobby and Game Shop didn't know if Punky was a boy or a girl. Nonetheless, Punky wants to keep the car and race it, much to Henry's chagrin. Richmond Matzie (Peter Billingsley), his father (Michael Alldredge) and the boys won't let Punky race the new remote control car on their regulation track, just because she's a girl. It seems that too many people are against Punky, so while Mike is setting Henry straight, Punky and Cherie take matters into their own hands, disguising as boys in order to gain access to the track, though they accidentally reveal themselves just before the race. Henry arrives to argue Punky's right to race, and she's granted permission to race. She wins, and after accepting the trophy, she says, "I'm going to put it next to my dolls."
36	16	"Cherie Lifesaver"	Art Dielhenn	Stephanie Mathison	January 19, 1986	216
Henry's old refrigerator breaks down, so he purchases a new one. At school, Mike teaches CPR to his class, but Allen acts up during the lesson, and is sent to the principal's office. Meanwhile, Henry is putting the old refrigerator outside the apartment building for the Salvation Army to pick up. The next day after school, Punky and her friends play a game of hide-and-seek. Henry was preparing to remove the door from the old refrigerator after buying the new one, that is until it started snowing. Punky, Allen, and Margaux ask Henry and Betty to help them look for Cherie, who still hasn't been found in the hide-and-seek game. Henry and Allen are shocked to find Cherie trapped inside of the old refrigerator. Allen doesn’t know how to save her, since Mike sent him to the principal's office during the CPR lesson. Henry has Allen call the paramedics and get Betty, while Punky and Margaux administer CPR to Cherie, managing to save her life. Allen is devastated that he was unable to help, thinking that she could've died because of him. But Henry tells Allen not to blame himself. Henry suggests that he and Allen learn CPR together, having learned its value by watching the girls save Cherie's life with it. Henry tells everyone that he should've taken the door off of the fridge, even after it started snowing. With the paramedics on the way, Cherie is feeling hungry, which is not unusual for her. Punky thinks that she’s going to be just fine. Note: This episode's plot was chosen in a home viewer contest, with the young winner named Jeremy Reenes being announced as he appears alongside the cast in an insert just before the actual episode starts. The episode ends with a reminder that CPR should only be administered by those properly trained.
37	17	"Changes, part 1"	Art Dielhenn	David W. Duclon	February 2, 1986	217
After fire trucks race down the street outside his apartment building, Henry gets a phone call that his photography studio is on fire. As Punky and Henry arrive to see the studio destroyed, a fireman tells Henry that a short circuit in the building's aging wiring was the probable cause of the fire. The studio served as Henry's only source of income, and he starts worrying greatly about his ability to pay the bills. He ends up collapsing and is taken to Cook County Hospital, where he is diagnosed with a bleeding ulcer. While Betty and Cherie help Punky pack to stay with them during Henry's time in the hospital, Department of Children and Family Services case worker Simon P. Chillings (Timothy Stack) drops by and informs Punky that Henry wants to adopt her. She is excited about the news, but when she reveals that Henry is in the hospital and that his photography studio burned down, Chillings starts questioning whether Henry is fit to become her foster father. Chillings visits Henry in the hospital, and after confirming his financial state and health, Chillings decides to remove Punky from Henry's custody. Unaware of the talk Henry and Chillings just had, an overjoyed Punky enters Henry's hospital room, thinking that he has already adopted her.
38	18	"Changes, part 2"	Art Dielhenn	Neil Lebowitz and Jim Evering	February 9, 1986	218
Before Henry breaks the news to Punky that he has not adopted her, Betty suggests that Punky stay with her and Cherie until Henry gets out of the hospital. Chillings says Punky will need to stay at Fenster Hall for at least three days, while he checks on Betty's qualifications as a temporary custodian. Punky becomes devastated when Henry tells her that she will be going to Fenster, and Chillings takes her there. After checking Betty's apartment, Chillings determines that she is not qualified, simply because Punky will not have her own bedroom. Betty questions that rule, failing to understand why Punky cannot share a room with her best friend Cherie, and instead has to share a room at Fenster Hall with four other girls whom she does not know. Later, at Fenster Hall, after Chillings tells Punky she will not be staying with the Johnsons, she traps Chillings in a closet and escapes. She then seeks guidance from her teacher Mike, who used to work at Fenster and takes her back there. Mike asks Chillings to reconsider his decision, but Chillings announces his intention to place Punky in a different foster home at the slightest sign of Henry being unable to recover financially or physically. While Mike is still at Fenster Hall, Punky calls Henry; as those two talk, Henry's ulcer worsens, and he collapses.
39	19	"Changes, part 3"	Art Dielhenn	Rick Hawkins	February 16, 1986	219
Henry undergoes emergency surgery following his collapse. Cherie, Margaux, and Allen visit Punky at Fenster Hall. Chillings relays to Mike that he is not convinced by the reports from Punky's last case worker about Henry, and he is still set on placing Punky with different foster parents. To that end, he disallows Punky from seeing Henry in the hospital, but Cherie, Margaux, and Allen have a plan to help Punky sneak out. Getting help from her roommates Liz (Laura Jacoby), Anna (Judith Barsi), Millie (Tannis Vallely), and Weezie (Akilah Denson), they disguise Punky as Margaux and Margaux as Punky, and to make the plan work, they ensure Chillings is without his glasses. Mike goes along with the plan and takes Punky to visit Henry. With Punky by Henry's side, as he is sleeping, she overhears Mike telling Betty about Chillings' desire to put her with new foster parents, something Henry does not need in his condition. Meanwhile, at Fenster Hall, prior to Punky's return, Chillings tries to give Margaux (thinking she is Punky) a personality test. Later, an awakened Henry reads a note from Punky, who blames herself for his condition and lets him know she will be better off with new foster parents. The note devastates Henry.
40	20	"Changes, part 4"	Art Dielhenn	Gary Menteer	February 23, 1986	220
Chillings introduces Punky to Tiffany and Jules Buckworth (Joan Welles, Robert Casper), a couple ready to adopt her. While Chillings shows his excitement, Punky is anything but happy about the arrangement. Meanwhile, Henry spends much of the day trying to call Chillings, from the hospital, and when he finally does get through, he tells Chillings not to place Punky with new foster parents, but he is too late. Tiffany and Jules bring Punky and Brandon to live with them in a large mansion. While Jules is a kind man who appears to have Punky's interests at heart, Tiffany is a wealthy woman belonging to a high social class, and expects Punky to conduct herself likewise. As Punky adjusts to life with the Buckworths, Henry returns home from the hospital and struggles to adjust without her around. Coming from a horse-riding lesson, Punky stops by the apartment to visit Henry. The two miss each other, though reluctant at first to express that face-to-face. Just as Punky is about to leave, she tells Henry that she wants to return to him, and Henry vows to regain custody of her.
41	21	"Changes, part 5"	Art Dielhenn	Rick Hawkins	March 2, 1986	221
Henry meets with Oliver Green (Earl Boen) about getting a bank loan to open a new photography studio in the Midtown Mall. Henry's request is initially denied due to having no credit history, but when he mentions he is trying to regain custody of Punky, Oliver recalls how she had asked him for a loan once, and decides to offer Henry a personal loan. Meanwhile, Tiffany has bought a castle on the French Riviera, and plans for Punky, Jules, and herself to move there. This leaves Punky in shock, just as she was about to share good news concerning Henry and his new studio. She pleas with the Buckworths to let her return to Henry, but Tiffany stubbornly refuses. As the arguing proceeds, an all-too-familiar speech Tiffany makes to Punky—the same one Jules remembers from their wedding night—angers Jules, compelling him to stand up to Tiffany and leave her. He also brings Punky back to Henry, as she requested, and she feels at home again. Sometime later, while Henry and Punky are out taking care of the adoption paperwork, Mike fills in at the new studio. He receives a phone call from Chillings, who offers his congratulations to Henry and Punky. Chillings also informs Mike that he has resigned from the DCFS, and has become the new man in Tiffany Buckworth's life. Once Henry and Punky return from the adoption proceedings, with Betty and Cherie, they all celebrate in the studio.
42	22	"Accidents Happen"	Art Dielhenn	David W. Duclon	March 9, 1986	222
At school, Punky makes a presentation about wanting to be an astronaut. Unfortunately, shortly after her inspiring presentation, the Space Shuttle Challenger fatally explodes soon after launch, resulting in the fatalities of all seven astronauts on board. America is observing national mourning, but Punky is hit especially hard. Mike tries to help his class understand the tragedy—especially Punky, whose dream is to become an astronaut, and because of the fatal explosion, her classmates think she's crazy. Not wanting to see Punky's dream die, Mike pulls some strings and manages to get famous astronaut Buzz Aldrin (as himself) to have a talk with Punky about the disaster. He convinces her to go on with her dreams, and makes her a member of the Young Astronauts. Thanks to Buzz, Punky decides to be brave and keep right on going with thoughts of going into space. Henry is embarrassed when Buzz arrives at the apartment to visit Punky, and sees Henry wearing a dress. Henry is wearing the dress because Betty needed a dummy to put the dress on so she could work on the dress.: Recording date: February 14, 1986

=== Season 3 (1987) ===
While the show was in production throughout the 1986–87 season, it did not return to the air via first-run syndication until October 30, 1987. Beginning on that premiere date, Punky Brewster was packaged such that new episodes would air once every weekday (usually late in the afternoon on independent stations). The entire third season (1986–87) aired in the five-days-a-week format through December 7, 1987. The following Monday, reruns of the third season took over on weekdays, while the episodes shot during the 1987–88 season were completing. On April 27, 1988, new episodes resumed for the fourth season, and ran every weekday for exactly a month until the series finale aired on Friday, May 27, 1988.

No. overall	No. in season	Title	Directed by	Written by	Original release date	Prod. code
43	1	"Reading, Writing, and Rock & Roll"	Gary Menteer	Alan Mandel	October 30, 1987	318
Punky has to do a book report for school, which Henry would like to proofread in appreciation of classic literature. Punky, not wanting to waste time having to read some dumb old book such as Tom Sawyer, buys an old book report off her friend Farley "Spud" Blugner (Brent Chalem). Henry is expecting a simple report from Punky, but when he sees Spud's report was on War & Peace, it is obvious the work is not hers. As punishment for plagiarism, Henry cancels Punky's plans to see her favorite singing group, DeBarge, in concert—a move that Punky vows to never forgive Henry for. Henry thinks it over, and takes on a "hipster" persona to get access to DeBarge backstage. Although that fails, DeBarge agrees to appear at their home, telling Punky they supported Henry's grounding because reading is an essential skill and they ask that Punky do her best in school. Since Punky has learned her lesson and missed the concert, DeBarge decides to bring the concert to her by performing some songs for Punky, Cherie, and Margaux.: Among the few songs by the DeBarge family featured in the episode included Chico DeBarge's "Cross That Line", performed at the end of the episode.
44	2	"Punky's Big Story"	Gary Menteer	Bill Idelson & Paul Friedman	November 2, 1987	308
The fifth-grade class is putting together a newspaper, and Punky has landed the job of "human interest editor". It proves to be a very boring job, especially when the best she can come up with is a story on the janitor. After being introduced to tabloid magazines, however, Punky finds a new lease on writer's life as a gossip columnist. Punky soon finds herself in hot water with her teacher, her schoolmates, and Henry, when the gossip column does nothing but cause problems, especially when Punky's column tells her teacher, Mrs. Winston (Alice Ghostley), which class put a frog in her briefcase. Mrs. Winston thought it was her biology class, but it was her history class.
45	3	"Tons of Fun"	Gary Menteer	Cheryl Alu	November 3, 1987	301
Punky and Henry welcome a visit from Henry's niece Louise (Danielle Rioux) from Toledo, Ohio, and Louise is carrying much more weight than she used to have. Louise handles the reactions with good humor at first, but after getting insulted by Margaux, Louise confides to Punky that she's unhappy with her weight. Punky organizes an extensive (and exhausting) weight-loss program for everyone, but Louise ends up gaining weight, and no one can understand why—until Punky finds Louise about to eat a midnight snack that takes up the entire kitchen table. Punky talks to Louise, and Louise takes her words to heart. Four months later, Louise makes a return visit, having successfully lost a great deal of weight.
46	4	"Divorce Anderson Style"	Gary Menteer	Cheryl Alu	November 4, 1987	302
Allen has been coming to Punky's house an awful lot lately, staying for meals and almost entire days. The reason is that Allen is terrified that his parents Andy (Greg Norberg) and Annie (Margaret Willock) are going to get a divorce, because Andy and Annie have been arguing a lot lately, more than usual. Punky and Henry decide to have a barbecue as a way to figure out the situation. Things go normally for a while, but Allen states that they're only bluffing. Sure enough, things devolve into an argument between Andy and Annie. Hoping to settle the waters, Henry explains to them that Allen was afraid that they would get divorced, but Andy and Annie tell him that they decided to do so the day before, shocking everyone. Allen is devastated by the news, Punky finds him living in the tree house the next day. Allen says he's never leaving the tree house, and Punky is shocked by the reason why: Allen has to move to Kansas with Annie. Henry comes outside and tells Allen that Annie is looking for him. Punky and the gang say a tearful goodbye to Allen, and Punky tells Allen that she and the gang will always be Allen's friends, and that they will always stay in touch with him.
47	5	"Beer & Buffalos Don't Mix"	David W. Duclon	Deborah Serra	November 5, 1987	306
After their friend Joey Deaton's father Mike (Todd Susman) gives Punky and Cherie a ride home from school, they try to tell Henry that they noticed the smell of beer on Mike's breath and that he was driving erratically. However, because Henry and Mike are good friends, Henry hesitates to believe them. Punky and Cherie go over to Joey's house to try to talk to Joey (Carl Steven) about Mike's drinking problem, and Joey gets angry and refuses to believe them. Henry and Mike notice that Joey and the girls aren't getting along, so they plan a trip to Six Flags to cheer them up. However, as they are about to leave, Mike drives his car into a garbage can, and Henry and Joey finally realize that Punky and Cherie were right after all. Mike decides to get help for his drinking problem, and he and Joey walk home. Note: This episode was produced after the two-part "Open Door, Broken Heart" (below), but the episodes were not aired in the intended order.
48	6	"Hands Across the Halls"	Martin Speer	Kevin Hartigan	November 6, 1987	310
Punky, Henry, and Brandon's regular viewing of Lifestyles of the Pets of the Rich and Famous is interrupted by a small fire in the opposite apartment. The apartment's resident, elderly Maude Firestein (Irene Tedrow), is apologetic for the mishap, with most being sympathetic except for chronic complainer Pete "Frank the Crank" Frank (Bruce Kirby), who wants Mrs. Firestein out of the building. Inside Mrs. Firestein's apartment, Henry discovers that the fire is the result of burning pajamas—Mrs. Firestein was drying her pajamas in her oven because she can't make it to the dryer in the building's basement. Mrs. Firestein's situation turns out to be even worse than that, as her son is now married and living in Philadelphia, and her son is strongly urging her to move into a nursing home for her safety. After finding out just how much Mrs. Firestein has to lose, Punky and Cherie are determined to rally the building into helping her stay. A meeting of all tenants is called, but Mr. Frank's resistance, combined with everyone else's busy lives, almost sinks the idea. When Mr. Frank's father Ben (Bill Erwin) is revealed to be the person who's been chosen to take over Mrs. Firestein's lease, Mr. Frank throws his full support into Punky and Cherie's plan, rallying the building and saving Mrs. Firestein from the nursing home. However, the joke is on Mr. Frank in the end when his father and Mrs. Firestein begin to date!
49	7	"Open Door, Broken Heart, part 1"	David W. Duclon	Deborah Serra	December 8, 1987	304
After Punky and Margaux finish grooming Brandon, an excited Cherie bursts in with the announcement that Lee Starker, the new boy in school, is borrowing her history notes. Margaux and Cherie excitedly discuss this turn of events. In her excitement, Cherie forgets to close the apartment door, and Brandon makes an escape. After discovering Brandon's departure, Punky organizes a mass search for him that takes up five-and-a-half hours, all of her friends' energy, and no Brandon. Cherie blames herself because she was the one who left the apartment door open. Meanwhile, a boy named Joey Deaton (Carl Steven), who lives only three blocks away, has found Brandon and begs his parents, Mike Deaton (Todd Susman) and Mrs. Deaton (Alley Mills), to let him keep the canine. His parents break down and agree to let him keep Brandon. While Punky continues her frantic efforts to find her Brandon, Joey's father tells his family that they're moving to California, and Joey can't wait to start over with Brandon there.
50	8	"Open Door, Broken Heart, part 2"	David W. Duclon	Deborah Serra	December 9, 1987	305
After Punky's attempt to get the police to look for Brandon, and a teen con artist (Scott Menville) shows up with a bad fake, Henry brings up the point that there's a chance that Brandon may not be found. Henry, Betty, and Cherie try to cheer Punky up with a new golden retriever puppy, but that doesn't work. However, one of the flyers that Cherie was handing out ends up in the hands of Joey's mother (Alley Mills). Joey doesn't want to give Brandon up, but Brandon takes matters into his own paws and escapes from Joey and shows up at Punky and Henry's door, being chased by Joey and his mother. With Brandon back, Punky decides to give the puppy to Joey, who has discovered that he and his parents won't be moving to California after all. Joey and his mother thank Punky and Henry for the new puppy when they leave and Joey reveals he has a crush on Punky, much to Punky’s embarrassment and teasing from Betty, Cherie, and Henry.
51	9	"Best Friends"	Gary Menteer	Migdia Chinea Varela	November 10, 1987	307
One day, over popsicle stick houses and big plants, Cherie finds love rolling in when Donald Sotta (Bumper Robinson) accidentally runs over Henry's gardening. It's love at first sight for Cherie and Donald, who start spending all their time with each other, and a hurt Punky gets really ticked off at being the third wheel. As Donald and Cherie continue to spend more time together, Punky finally makes her feelings known, and the demolition of Punky's popsicle stick house for lumber is the last straw. Punky attempts to get over Cherie by becoming best friends with Margaux instead, but that doesn't work. And things don’t work out between Donald and Cherie; all Donald ends up thinking about is baseball, basketball, and wrestling, and an apologetic Cherie would much rather hang out with Punky.
52	10	"It's a Dog's Life"	Gary Menteer	David W. Duclon	November 11, 1987	309
Henry is just about to walk a very antsy Brandon when Punky walks in. Margaux has invited Punky to take a ride on her yacht on Lake Michigan, and Punky wants to go out shopping for things she'll want to take with her, but Henry won't let her until she takes Brandon for a walk and gives him a bath. Punky sneaks out with the plan of taking care of Brandon after she goes shopping, but when she gets home, she finds that Brandon has trashed the apartment. Henry comes home, and when he sees the apartment, he grounds Punky from the yacht trip, and she grumbles as she falls asleep that night, leading her to have a dream that Brandon is stuck in her body, and she's stuck in Brandon's body. After waking up the next morning, Punky is a lot more aware of Brandon's needs.
53	11	"The Metamorphosis"	Judi Elterman	Deborah Serra	November 12, 1987	303
One night after dinner, Punky decides that she needs to talk to Henry about the life-altering event that she may need her first bra. A desperately embarrassed Henry calls Betty, but his comments about not wanting to see Punky grow up are overheard by Punky. As Betty attempts to talk to the girls about the changes they're going through, Punky storms off, thinking Henry will no longer love her when she grows up. Henry has to deal with things himself now, and during an uncomfortable trip to a store's bra section, Punky tells Henry what she overheard him saying to Betty. Punky and Henry have a talk that straightens things out as Henry explains to Punky that he'll always love her, no matter what. (Note: This episode never aired on The Family Channel when they aired reruns of the show during the mid-1990s, due to its subject matter.)
54	12	"Fighting City Hall"	Joni Rhodes	Jerry Mayer	November 13, 1987	311
After another warning from Henry not to play baseball in a dangerous, abandoned lot on a nearby street corner, Punky is curious to see if she can get that lot turned into a park because the closest park is about 5 miles away. To that end, she gets Henry to be her spokesperson to the city council, despite his fear of public speaking. Their first attempt goes very badly, as Henry can't even get his words out, and he embarrasses himself on public-access television. Punky saves the moment by making the speech herself while he's gone, and they promise to consider it. At the next meeting, Mr. Arnold (Frederic Arnold) announces that he wants to get a mall built on the lot, not realizing that Chicago has too many malls already. Henry snaps into action, rallying the attendees into reversing the council's position. The council (which also included one councilman portrayed by Michael Dorn) decides to turn the vacant lot into a park called Pulaski Park.
55	13	"The Matchmaker"	Gary Menteer	John Hudock	November 13, 1987	314
Henry is being groomed for a blind date that Punky and Cherie have set up for him with Camille Maytag (Joyce Meadows), the school's librarian, and he's not terribly happy about it. His attitude improves upon actually meeting Ms. Maytag, and the success gives Punky and Cherie the idea to fix Betty up too. Despite Betty's protests, Punky and Cherie convince Betty to appear on Dream Date. There's only two people standing in Betty's way to having a good time on the show: Shirley Toupes (Aixa Clemente), a beautician with an attitude, and Aquaria LaRue (Gloria Delaney), a spaced-out astrologist. And Mr. Dream Date himself is Chuck McKinley (Johnny Brown), a "stunt double for Mr. T" who turns out to have half the cool and twice the bulk. Out of the three contestants, Chuck chooses Betty. Surprisingly, though, they end up having a great time, just as Henry decides that he doesn't want to be with Ms. Maytag anymore, because he thinks she's too wild for him.
56	14	"My Fair Punky"	Joni Rhodes	Neil Lebowitz	November 16, 1987	312
Henry is busily preparing for a visit from someone who might become the most high-profile customer he's ever had. Charles Cantrell (William Glover), the social planner for wealthy kid Robert Whitney (Ryan Bollman), turns out to be much more impressed by Henry's work than his lifestyle, but Punky, who is Robert's age, gives Charles pause. After a bored Robert invites Punky to his birthday party, which Henry is hired to photograph, the snobby Charles stakes Henry's job on a drastic improvement in Punky's refinement. In order to keep from embarrassing Henry and costing him the job, Punky takes lessons from Margaux on how to act like a rich stiff. Unfortunately, Punky's lack of actual experience shows through, and Charles thinks it would be better for Punky to wait in the kitchen with the help until the party is over. Henry stands up for Punky and loses the job, but Robert, who is not a snob, fires Charles, and then gives Henry the photographing job back. Robert had been wishing that Charles hadn't invited any stiffs to the party, because Robert wanted the party to be more fun than Charles wanted it to be.
57	15	"The Anniversary"	David W. Duclon	David W. Duclon	November 17, 1987	319
Henry has bought tickets to the circus which is scheduled for the next day, May 9. When Cherie starts acting strange and says she can't go to the circus, Punky remembers that Punky's diary says that Cherie acted the same way on May 9 of last year. Punky wants to know why Cherie likes to be alone on May 9 of every year, so Punky decides to follow Cherie around on May 9—and discovers that May 9 is the anniversary of the day Cherie's parents, Ronald George Johnson and Elizabeth Marie Johnson, were killed in a car accident in 1981. Cherie is understandably still having problems coping with the tragedy. Cherie feels guilty about it, thinking that the accident was her fault because Ronald and Elizabeth were on their way to pick her up from school on that day. Punky talks to Betty, who says that Cherie never talks about Ronald and Elizabeth, not even to Betty, and has never even been to the cemetery where her parents were buried. Cherie has kept her feelings about the deaths all balled up inside of her, and Betty doesn't think that's healthy. Betty thinks Cherie needs to find a way to let out her feelings about the deaths. An understanding Punky compassionately talks to Cherie, and takes her to the cemetery. As Cherie visits Ronald and Elizabeth's grave for the first time and says everything that she has wanted to say to her parents, Cherie breaks down, sobbing uncontrollably. Punky is there to help Cherie finish saying what she wants to say, and it seems that Punky is making progress in helping Cherie come to terms with the deaths of her parents.
58	16	"Tangled Web"	Gary Menteer	Cheryl Alu	November 20, 1987	316
Punky is having an ongoing debate with Henry—she thinks she's old enough to see the R-rated movie Slime Wars in Space, but Henry doesn't agree and won't take her. Cherie and Margaux have each seen it twice, and Punky feels left out because she hasn't seen it at all. Cherie and Margaux hatch a plan to get Punky to the movie theater during school hours. Punky claims illness at the end of lunch, and goes to the theater in disguise while Henry is working. But there are problems: Henry gets called in the middle of a job about Punky's illness, Punky's poor disguise gets a ticket taker named Claude (Lance Wilson-White) fired from the theater when he falls for it, and Cherie's attempts to lie for Punky almost get Henry to start a police search when she doesn't make it back before him. Punky does end up seeing part of the movie, and when she hears about what's been going on, she convinces the theatre manager (Robin Bach) to give Claude his job back. Henry is furious at Punky for disobeying him, and as her punishment she'll have to work off the money that he cost her when the call from school diverted him from his important job at the studio. The job was to photograph Andre Sockstein (Alan Sues), the conductor of the Chicago Metropolitan Symphony.
59	17	"Punky's Porker"	Gary Menteer	Paul Friedman & Bill Idelson	November 25, 1987	315
One day, at the Midtown Mall, near the space that Henry's studio occupies, Punky befriends a pig that's being used as part of a display for a farmer named Jimmy John (James Hampton). But Pinky the pig is a visual aid for different pork cuts, and is scheduled to be butchered. Punky doesn't want Pinky to die, but Punky's attempts to rile the crowd and appeal to Henry both fail miserably, so she turns to her friends and forms a plan to steal Pinky in order to save her life. It doesn't take Henry long to discover the new addition to the apartment, and Jimmy John is summoned to retrieve Pinky. In the face of Punky's pleas, Henry thinks on the spot, and convinces Jimmy John to feature Pinky in an ad campaign.
60	18	"This Spud's for You"	Joni Rhodes	Gary Menteer	December 1, 1987	320
One weekend, during lunch with Cherie at the apartment, Punky gets a visit from overweight classmate Spud Blugner (Brent Chalem). He tries hard to get Punky to ask him to the Sadie Hawkins Day dance, but to no avail. Spud convinces Punky that he has a friend named Farley that can get her tickets to any concert going. She takes the bait and promises a date to Farley, which is actually Spud's real name. Punky goes and visits his apartment to tell him the deal's off, and after she gets there, he walks onto the outside window ledge and threatens to jump unless she agrees to the date. In attempting to get him back in, Punky ends up trapped on the ledge with him. Part of the ledge breaks off, blocking their way back to Spud's bedroom window. They eventually get rescued by the fire department, and Spud confesses that he loves Punky with all his heart. Punky agrees to go to the dance with him.
61	19	"So Long, Studio"	Gary Menteer	Deborah Serra	December 2, 1987	317
While Henry is closing his studio for the day, he is approached by Matt Glossy (David Spielberg), the owner of Glossy's, which is a $40,000,000 empire of photography stores. Glossy admits that his real name is Sam Glossy, and that he thought the name "Matt Glossy" sounded better for business. Glossy is going to be opening a branch in the Midtown Mall, but he wants to give Henry a fair chance and buy out his studio rather than running it out of business. Glossy offers to buy Henry's studio for $100,000 so he can turn it into a branch of Glossy's. Henry, who has been a photographer for 43 years, accepts the offer, and Glossy hires Henry as the manager of that branch of Glossy's. But Henry feels so miserable working for the tyrannical Glossy that he ends up quitting. Punky convinces Henry to use the $100,000 he got from Glossy to open up a new restaurant. Since it was Punky's idea, Henry names the new restaurant "Punky's Place".
62	20	"Help Wanted"	Gary Menteer	Mike Marmer	December 3, 1987	321
Punky is at the restaurant celebrating the beginning of summer, but lamenting that she won't get to go to camp because of a lack of money. When Henry's most valuable employee, Stanley (Brian Cole), quits his job after mistreatment by a customer, Henry tries to find a replacement for Stanley, but to no avail. Punky tells Henry that she needs money to pay her own way into summer camp. Henry is reluctant to take Punky on as an employee, but he finally relents and gives her a chance. Punky's first shift couldn't go any worse than it does, however, and Henry promptly fires her. A hurt Punky wages a war of silence with Henry, until Betty convinces them to talk to each other again. Punky explains that she just wanted to do a good job for Henry. Henry, remembering his own tough father, agrees to give Punky another chance if Punky will be more willing to learn how to do some of the things that she made mistakes doing. Punky agrees, and Henry rehires her.
63	21	"Remember When"	Gary Menteer	Neil Lebowitz	December 4, 1987	322
After a long day of collecting snowballs for storage and storing them in the refrigerator's freezer, Punky, Cherie, Margaux, and Brandon are ready to wind down. The worst blizzard in years strikes Chicago, however, and a series of mishaps leaves Henry, Betty, Punky, Cherie, Margaux, and Brandon trapped in the apartment without power or heat, with conditions too severe to travel in. With little else to do, the group reminisces about various situations that they've been in. After a period of time, power is restored, enabling the furnace to kick back on.
64	22	"Unhooking Henry"	Joni Rhodes	Phil Hahn	December 7, 1987	313
In the middle of taking out the garbage, Punky finds an empty sleeping pill bottle. Henry admits that he's been taking sleeping pills for the past six months because of his back sprain. Of course, a back sprain doesn't take six months to heal, so Henry has developed an addiction to the pills. Henry resolves to quit, but he's re-filling the prescription within the night and delivered the same night by a delivery man (Meshach Taylor). Punky and Betty attempt to help him sleep naturally in order to cure the habit, but more than 48 sleepless hours pass before Henry makes one last desperate effort to get sleeping pills. Punky has to physically hold Henry from the pills, and that snaps Henry out of it long enough to dump his supply of sleeping pills down the drain of the kitchen sink. Punky explains to Henry that she wants him to be around for a long time. Henry understands, and he ends up getting six hours of sleep without the pills, which pleasantly surprises him.

=== Season 4 (1988) ===
No. overall	No. in season	Title	Directed by	Written by	Original release date	Prod. code
65	1	"The Nun's Story"	Gary Menteer	Cheryl Alu	April 27, 1988	401
Punky, Cherie, and Betty are getting ready for a food-filled trip to a drive-in movie when there is a knock at the door. Punky answers the door, and it's a nun who introduces herself as Sister Mary Malcolm (Patricia Wilson) from Our Lady of Perpetual Agony, a convent that is collecting used clothing and household items that they can sell to raise enough money to get a new furnace for the convent. Punky checks the living room closet, and she finds a brass urn that she donates. Later, Henry, Betty, Punky, and Cherie get back from the drive-in. Henry opens the closet door, and asks Punky about the urn. Henry says it contains the ashes of his late Aunt Mable, and that he plans to drive the urn to Evanston tomorrow afternoon for Mable's son Archie. Punky tries to figure out how to get the urn back, and Cherie and Margaux come over. Punky decides that the only way to do it is to go to the convent. After Margaux leaves, Punky and Cherie head out. After a series of mishaps at the convent, Punky and Cherie head home without the urn. They’re told by Henry that he actually had four of the brass urns, and Henry had put the one with Mable's ashes in it in the apartment building's basement instead of the living room closet; thus, Punky did not give away Mable's ashes.
66	2	"Crushed"	Gary Menteer	Deborah Serra	April 28, 1988	402
Punky has a crush on 16-year-old Kevin Dowling (Dan Gauthier), who is helping her install a stereo in the tree house. Punky tells Henry about Kevin, and Henry, who doesn't understand that Punky just has a crush on Kevin, vows to break every bone in Kevin's body. Betty, who has known Kevin and his family for years, calms Henry down by telling him that Punky just has a crush on Kevin. After planning a candlelight dinner for the two of them, Punky is crushed when she meets Kevin's girlfriend Gina (Lisa Alpert). Kevin apologizes to Punky for hurting her, and he tells her that he likes her as a friend. After Kevin leaves, Henry cheers Punky up, and the two enjoy the dinner she had prepared.
67	3	"Going to Camp"	Gary Menteer	Deborah A. Serra	April 29, 1988	403
Punky, Cherie, and Margaux go to summer camp, where they learn about such traditions as T-shirt raids, and the kissing rock. But Punky doesn't seem to have the same romantic visions about those things that Cherie, Margaux, and their roommate Marcie (Tanya Fenmore) have—until Punky is kissed by a boy named Jimmy (Randy Josselyn). Also, Cherie is annoyed by Franco Grenolli (Shawn Harrison), a fellow camper who has a crush on her.
68	4	"Poor Margaux"	Gary Menteer	Cheryl Alu	May 2, 1988	404
When Margaux and her parents go bankrupt because of a series of mistakes by Mr. Kramer's accountant, they auction off all of their belongings. Punky and Cherie use their skiing trip money to buy Margaux's favorite doll back for her—a true showing of friendship that Margaux appreciates. Margaux returns the favor by inviting Punky and Cherie on the skiing trip when her family later comes back into having money again because of a turnaround in Mr. Kramer's financial fortunes. Mr. Kramer scraped together some cash, and got a highly lucrative stock tip from his butler Jeffrey (Ivon Bonar).
69	5	"Brandon's Commercial"	Judi Elterman	Mike Marmer	May 3, 1988	405
Brandon gets a shot at stardom when Churchill, the famous dog hired for a dog food commercial to be filmed at the restaurant, gets camera shy—and so does Brandon, blowing a chance for $1,000 and messing up Punky's dream of Brandon becoming a star. For that, an angry Punky calls Brandon a bad dog. After Henry helps Punky realize that she was the one who wanted to be a star, Punky apologizes to Brandon.
70	6	"Passed Away at Punky's Place"	Judi Elterman	Mike Marmer	May 4, 1988	406
While Henry is in Detroit to pick up a new pizza oven for the restaurant, Punky and Cherie decide to run the restaurant for the one day that Henry will be out of town, and they panic when a customer named Ralph (Greg Lewis) falls asleep because of narcolepsy. Punky and Cherie don't realize that Ralph is just asleep—they think Ralph is dead because of the secret ingredient Cherie uses when she makes hamburgers, and when a newspaper's restaurant critic eats there, they fear that it'll hurt the restaurant's reputation.
71	7	"Christmas Hero"	Jim Cox	Deborah A. Serra	May 5, 1988	407
Punky desperately wants to give Henry a pocket watch for Christmas. When rich businessman Horatio Lake (Richard Kline) is robbed of a briefcase containing valuables, Punky solves the robbery and figures out that it was Mr. Lake's son Jerry (Donnie Jeffcoat) who took the briefcase. Punky tells Mr. Lake what went on: Jerry figured that he would take the briefcase and lie low with it for a few days, and then when the police gave up, Jerry would say that he found the briefcase. That way, he would be the hero, and maybe Mr. Lake would pay more attention to him for a change. Jerry wanted attention from his father after years of being pretty much ignored by him. Mr. Lake wonders how he could've let things get to a point where Jerry thought he had to do what he did, and he realizes his mistake of ignoring Jerry all these years, vowing not to let that mistake happen again. As a reward to Punky for solving the robbery and helping Jerry and Mr. Lake become closer than ever, Mr. Lake gives Punky a pocket watch, and Punky gives it to Henry as a Christmas gift.
72	8	"Cosmetic Scam" "Beauty Lesson"	Jim Cox	Cheryl Alu	May 6, 1988	408
Punky and Cherie sell cosmetics door-to-door for Lady Contempo Cosmetics—until they discover that Lady Contempo Cosmetics is a scam run by a con artist named Sidney (Casey Sander). Henry washes his hair with Lady Contempo shampoo...and he wakes up the next morning with no hair on his head. And the blue face mask that Betty rubbed on her face won't come off. Punky and the gang have to deal with angry customers who have also felt the various side effects of Lady Contempo products, and when they go to Lady Contempo to confront Sidney, they notice that no one's there. It turns out that the reason why Henry is bald headed is because he washed his hair with Contempo furniture stripper that Sidney had disguised as Lady Contempo shampoo, and the reason why the blue face mask won't come off of Betty's face is because the face mask is actually kitchen floor wax that was disguised as the face mask cream. While they're in Sidney's office, a police detective named Denko (Johnny Haymer) shows up looking for Sidney, who has cleared out.
73	9	"See You in Court"	John Sgueglia	Bruce Howard	May 9, 1988	409
One of Betty's favorite patients dies and leaves her a Texan car with big bull horns on its hood, but Betty doesn't know how to drive. Henry's attempts to teach Betty how to drive result in Betty crashing the car into a tree. Because of that, Henry and Betty decide to sue each other, and they each tell Judge J. F. Taylor (Roxie Roker) a different story about what happened. It's Punky and Cherie who help Henry and Betty put aside their differences and be friends again.
74	10	"Radio Daze"	Marc Gass	Mike Marmer	May 10, 1988	410
Punky's favorite rock radio station went bankrupt and is now acquired by a firm that switched the format to dramatic performances. In order to encourage kids' interest in older radio, the new owners sponsor a contest where whichever group gives the best performance will get a trip to Disneyland. Punky, Cherie and Marguax learn about old-time radio and how the actors made their own sound effects right in the studio, which looks like fun, but Punky's zeal is tempered when she must take on Garth Goobler (Jason Hervey) and Grant Goobler (Ryan Rushton), the sons of a famous radio star. Henry encourages Punky to get to work on a script, telling her she can never become an astronaut or like profession if she only worries about competitors. The Gooblers have a strong script, and they steal a box of sound effect equipment from Punky and Cherie, but the girls quickly gather some more sound effect equipment and are able to pull off the win.
75	11	"Aunt Larnese Is Coming to Town"	Nick Abdo	Sean Roche	May 11, 1988	411
Cherie's aunt Larnese Barker (Marilyn McCoo), who is Betty's sister, arrives for a visit on Cherie's 12th birthday, and Larnese asks Cherie if she would like to live with Larnese in Paris, France. Cherie is excited at first, but then Cherie decides that she doesn't want to leave Chicago and move so far away from Betty and Punky.
76	12	"Dear Diary"	Deveney Marking	Cheryl Alu	May 12, 1988	412
A nosy Punky sneaks a peak at Cherie's diary, and Punky is shocked to see that Cherie has written unkind things about Punky in it. Punky is even more shocked to discover that it's a fake diary that Cherie wrote to teach Punky a lesson about nosiness. Meanwhile, Henry is considering getting rid of some stuff he has accumulated over the years. He has a "keep" box and a "throw away" box. Betty convinces Henry to put his Ching Yang Yang Ching lamp in the "throw away" box. It turns out that Betty has had her eyes on that lamp for years, and she has tricked Henry into giving her a chance to get her hands on it.
77	13	"The Reading Game"	Deveney Marking	Betty Yahr	May 13, 1988	413
Cherie's cousins Paula (Victoria Lowery) and her baby brother Bobby (Steven Hodges) arrive for a visit, and Paula, who is about the same age as Punky and Cherie and a gifted artist, wins an art contest, but asks Punky to fill out the registration form because she is illiterate. Punky is perplexed how Paula could have advanced to her grade level without her illiteracy coming to the attention of teachers, but Paula says the smart kids admired her drawings so much they did her homework in exchange for them, thinking she does not need to worry about her illiteracy. There is trouble ahead when little Bobby gets into Henry's cleaning cabinet and drinks fabric softener, and when Paula dials 911 the EMTs cannot help her, as she cannot dictate the label on the bottle. Punky and Cherie show up and are able to read the bottle, and Bobby's life is saved, teaching Paula how important it is to know how to read.
78	14	"Ouch"	Deveney Marking	Deborah A. Serra	May 16, 1988	414
Punky is terrified when she has to have her appendix removed, and angry when it delays the two-week vacation to Lake Geneva that Punky, Cherie, Brandon, Betty, and Henry were getting ready for when she collapsed from the pain of appendicitis. It took Punky two months to convince the notoriously cheap Henry and his wallet that they should go on the vacation. After the surgery is done and Punky wakes up, Henry tells Punky that they'll still go on that vacation when she gets out of the hospital.
79	15	"No No, We Won't Go"	Jim Cox	Cheryl Alu	May 17, 1988	415
The apartment building's new owner wants to increase Betty's rent by 60%. Betty is afraid that a 60% rent increase would force her and Cherie to move out of the building. Punky and Cherie don't want that to happen, and Henry agrees to see who the building's new owner is so they can make a complaint. It turns out to be Margaux's father, Benjamin J. Kramer (Thomas Callaway). Punky and Cherie get Margaux to go with them to Benjamin's office to protest the rent increase, and Benjamin finds them there when the building's smoke alarm goes off. Benjamin calls Henry and Betty to the building, and to keep Betty's rent from being increased, Margaux makes a deal with Benjamin—Margaux agrees to do her own nails for a year to make up the money that Benjamin would lose if he doesn't increase the rent.
80	16	"Bad Dog"	Jim Cox	Deborah A. Serra	May 18, 1988	416
Punky and the gang want to know why Brandon is acting so strange lately...and then Brandon is accused of biting a new neighbor, Ms. Jenner (Sandra Kerns), which is something Brandon has never done to anyone before. As a result, Ms. Jenner wants Brandon to be put to sleep (euthanized), so Brandon is taken to an animal shelter for a 10-day quarantine. While Brandon is at the shelter, Betty notices that Ms. Jenner's daughter Leslie (Heather Hopper) has a black eye, and Henry and Betty confront her about it. Ms. Jenner admits that she has two jobs so she can make enough money for her and Leslie to live on, and that the stress of having two jobs gets to her so much sometimes that she finds herself taking it out on Leslie, who is always the only one there. Brandon has been acting strange because he's been hearing the screaming that's been coming from Ms. Jenner's apartment, which is above Punky's and Henry's apartment, and Brandon bit Ms. Jenner to protect Leslie from her. Betty offers Ms. Jenner a place in a group called Parents Anonymous so she can get the help she needs. Ms. Jenner accepts the offer, and she decides that she does not want Brandon to be put to sleep. Leslie in turn will move in with an aunt for a little while, as she and her mother have some things to work out, while Brandon is released back to Punky and Henry.
81	17	"Vice Versa"	Deveney Marking	Deborah A. Serra	May 19, 1988	419
It’s a school morning, and Henry asks Punky if she finished her history essay. The only thing she wrote down is “Napoleon was a nerd.” The essay is not due until the next day. Henry tells Punky that after school, she is to do the essay right, and clean her room. Margaux has a huge party coming up that weekend, and there will even be a live band. After school that day, it’s 8:30pm, and Punky and Cherie are still not home. They come in a few minutes later, explaining that they stopped at the mall on the way home and lost track of time. They had Henry and Betty worried. Punky tells Henry that she put a new outfit for the party on layaway, but Henry had already told her that they can’t afford an outfit. Betty grounds Cherie, which means she’ll miss the party. Henry asks where Punky’s history essay is. Punky hands it to him, and this time, it says “Napoleon was a short nerd.” Henry likewise grounds Punky for two weeks, which means she’ll miss the party. Punky goes to her room, and Cherie goes upstairs to her and Betty’s apartment. Betty and Henry admit to each other that they feel terrible about making the girls miss the party, and they admit that punishing the girls makes them feel awful. Betty mentions that Cherie gets a huge, and costly, appetite whenever she’s grounded. Betty says, “When they’re grounded for two weeks, we’re grounded for two weeks.” That night, thinking that Henry’s not fair, Punky has a dream that she's an indulgent parent who lets her kids do whatever they want to do. In the dream, Punky and Cherie are the parents, and Henry and Betty are the kids. For Punky, the dream ends up showing her Henry’s side of the situation. After waking up, Punky tells Henry about the dream. Henry tells Punky that there are difficulties in raising a child, and that being a parent sometimes means making an unpopular decision, like grounding your child. Punky apologizes to Henry for her recent behavior.
82	18	"Wimped Out"	Deveney Marking	Deborah A. Serra	May 23, 1988	417
Cherie thinks she's a wimp after failing to prevent Punky from falling out of the tree house, and Punky sustains a broken arm and leg as a result (ironically, while trying to hang up a banner that read "School's out, bop 'till you drop"). Later, while Henry, Betty, and Cherie are at the hospital with Punky for a check-up with her doctor, Cherie regains her courage in a stalled elevator, when a pregnant woman named Nancy (Patrika Darbo) goes into labor. With Punky disabled, Cherie is forced to deliver the baby.
83	19	"One Plus Tutor is Three"	Deveney Marking	Cheryl Alu	May 24, 1988	418
Punky has a D in math, a subject that she hasn’t been doing very well at. As a result, Henry and Punky’s teacher have agreed that she needs a math tutor. With a name like Walker Wimbley (Mark-Paul Gosselaar), Punky thinks her tutor will be a nerd. But Walker turns out to be a Casanova who tests the friendship between Punky and Margaux by falling head over heels for Margaux—crushing a love-struck Punky. When Walker becomes bored with Margaux, he decides that he likes Punky. Explaining his behavior to Punky, Walker says "All that blonde hair blinded me." Realizing what a jerk Walker is, Punky stands up for Margaux. Cherie and a shocked Margaux overhear it. With Margaux and Cherie's help, Punky gets even with Walker, and they make him leave the apartment.
84	20	"The Dilemma"	Deveney Marking	Cheryl Alu & Deborah A. Serra	May 25, 1988	420
Punky is in a sticky situation when she ends up having to juggle two dates—Brian (Chad Allen) and Tom (Ryan Tonet) -- at the Saturday afternoon movie, and Cherie carries a camera around with her to take pictures of how Punky, Brian, and Tom deal with it. Cherie later shows Henry and Betty the pictures as a slide show. Henry and Betty think it's hilarious, while Punky thinks it's embarrassing.
85	21	"What's Your Sign?"	Deveney Marking	Cheryl Alu	May 26, 1988	421
During a firefly girl troop meeting, Punky befriends a girl named Maria Aragon (Illiana Esparza), who is hearing-impaired. Maria and her mother (Lupe Ontiveros) have just moved to Chicago from Detroit. Maria begins to think that because of her disability, she'll never be accepted by the other girls in the troop, so Punky helps Maria make friends in the troop.
86	22	"Wedding Bells for Brandon"	Deveney Marking	Neil Lebowitz	May 27, 1988	422
In the final episode of the series, Punky and the gang throw a wedding for Brandon and another golden retriever named Brenda, who is owned by Punky's friend Myron (Brian Rubin). As Punky and the gang prepare for the wedding and the ceremony takes place, there are flashbacks, focusing on some of Brandon's scenes from past episodes. At the end of the episode, a picture of the show's cast and the episode's guest stars appears on the screen.
