= List of Head of the Class episodes =

The following is a list of episodes for the television sitcom Head of the Class. The series premiered on September 17, 1986, on ABC, and ended on June 25, 1991. A total of 114 episodes were produced spanning five seasons.

== Series overview ==
Season	Episodes	Originally released		Rank	Rating
Season	Episodes	First released	Last released	Rank	Rating
1	22	September 17, 1986	May 6, 1987	30	16.4
2	22	September 23, 1987	May 11, 1988	23	16.7 (Tied with The NBC Sunday Night Movie)
3	22	October 19, 1988	May 10, 1989	20	17.1
4	26	September 27, 1989	May 2, 1990	26	14.8
5	22	September 11, 1990	June 25, 1991	26	14.5

== Episodes ==
=== Season 1 (1986–87) ===
No. overall	No. in season	Title	Directed by	Written by	Original release date	Rating/share (households)
1	1	"Pilot"	John Tracy	Rich Eustis & Michael Elias	September 17, 1986	21.0/34
Substitute teacher Charlie Moore (Howard Hesseman) starts teaching the IHP history class with a new approach.
2	2	"Back to the Future"	John Tracy	Rich Eustis & Michael Elias	September 24, 1986	19.2/30
Charlie isn’t looking forward to his class reunion, and Eric isn’t looking forward to shag the future holds in store for him.
3	3	"Charliegate"	Art Dielhenn	Alan Rosen	October 1, 1986	18.5/30
History isn’t always the truth—a lesson the class learns when Dennis turns an evening of conversation with Charlie into a muck-raking article for the school newspaper.
4	4	"Love at First Byte"	Frank Bonner	Howard Adler & Robert Griffard	October 22, 1986	16.7/24
Love notes from a secret admirer have high school history teacher Charlie Moore playing detective. His honors class knows who it is, but they’re not telling.
5	5	"The Outsider"	Kim Friedman	Valri Bromfield	October 29, 1986	15.9/25
Charlie has to choose between his glamorous date (Maggie Han) and emotionally immature and socially inept Janice, a child genius, who desperately wants to fit in with her fellow students.
6	6	"Teacher's Teacher"	Lee Shallat	Susan Rogers & Jeffrey Hammond	November 5, 1986	16.6/25
Substitute teacher Charlie Moore’s students give him a surprise farewell party, but it’s the regular, Mr. Thomas (Roscoe Lee Browne), who delivers the real surprise.
7	7	"Volleyball Anyone?"	Peter Baldwin	Michael Reiss & Al Jean	November 12, 1986	17.3/26
Arvid tries to impress a girl by challenging the school basketball players to a volleyball match against the IHP class.
8	8	"Critical Choices"	Lee Shallat	Gary Gilbert	November 19, 1986	13.5/21
Charlie tries his hand at Hamlet, and solicits his students' feedback -- which is less than flattering.
9	9	"Cold Turkey"	Lee Shallat	Rich Eustis & Michael Elias	November 26, 1986	14.2/23
Charlie, alone for Thanksgiving, is invited to each of his students' homes, but ends up spending Thanksgiving with Dr. Samuels.
10	10	"You've Got a Friend"	Art Dielhenn	Gary Gilbert	December 3, 1986	17.1/26
After their team project wins them a trip to Washington, D.C., Sarah and Arvid develop slight feelings for each other. But things aren't necessarily a bed of roses between them.
11	11	"As Time Goes By"	Peter Baldwin	Gary Gilbert	December 10, 1986	16.7/26
Charlie's ex-flame (Isabella Hoffman) evaluates the class.
12	12	"The Way We Weren't"	Andrew D. Weyman	Murray Mednick	December 17, 1986	15.7/24
When doing reports on their ancestry, both Alan and Darlene find things out that they don't want to.
13	13	"Rebel Without a Class"	Bill Davis	Alan Rosen	January 7, 1987	19.2/28
Eric makes trouble for another teacher (Peter Vogt).
14	14	"Ode to Simone"	Art Dielhenn	Lee Grant	January 14, 1987	16.7/25
Simone receives a discouraging letter from her favorite poet....after his death. Dennis tries to give up sarcasm and pranks.
15	15	"Past Imperfect"	Andrew D. Weyman	Jerry Rannow	January 21, 1987	18.6/27
Charlie must pass a test in Macro Economics in order to keep his teaching license. The IHP attempt to help him.
16	16	"A Problem Like Maria"	Andrew D. Weyman	Cynthia Thompson	January 28, 1987	16.9/25
Maria dates the captain of the opposing team.
17	17	"The Russians Are Coming, the Russians Are Coming!"	Art Dielhenn	George Beckerman	February 4, 1987	17.1/25
The IHP faces their Russian counterparts in an academic tournament. Eric must join the team to replace an ailing Jawaharlal.
18	18	"Valentine's Day"	Art Dielhenn	Gary Gilbert	February 11, 1987	16.8/25
The class has problems on Valentine's Day.
19	19	"Video Activity"	Art Dielhenn	Larry Spencer	February 18, 1987	18.9/28
Dr. Samuels wants the IHP to create a staid, dignified entry for the Fillmore High time capsule, but instead the class makes a music video (to "The Future's So Bright, I Gotta Wear Shades" by Timbuk 3.)
20	20	"Privilege"	Art Dielhenn	Janet Coleman & David Dozer	February 25, 1987	18.2/27
Charlie sets Arvid up with a job at a hot nightclub, which causes Arvid to develop a cocky, image-conscious attitude.
21	21	"Crimes of the Heart"	Art Dielhenn	Larry Spencer	April 1, 1987	17.1/26
The class is mystified when Sarah's grades tumble.
22	22	"The Secret Life of Arvid Engen"	Art Dielhenn	Ray Jessel & Cynthia Thompson	May 6, 1987	15.7/27
Arvid starts to daydream about Lori (placing them successively as characters in Star Trek, The Honeymooners and Moonlighting) and it affects his schoolwork.

=== Season 2 (1987–88) ===
No. overall	No. in season	Title	Directed by	Written by	Original release date	Rating/share (households)
23	1	"Science Fair-Weather Friends"	Art Dielhenn	Larry Spencer	September 23, 1987	17.4/29
Sarah, Arvid, and Dennis compete, deceive and even indulge in sabotage to try and win the science fair.
24	2	"The Write Stuff"	Art Dielhenn	Lisa Rosenthal	September 30, 1987	17.1/28
Charlie encourages the class to revitalize the school's literary journal, and the class votes Simone as editor-in-chief. Unfortunately, the position's power goes to Simone's head. Meanwhile, Eric fabricates a memoir for the journal, which dishonestly wins him more attention than Simone.
25	3	"The Big Squeeze"	Art Dielhenn	Brad Isaacs	October 7, 1987	18.7/29
The IHP are concerned when they learn a transfer student (Leon Fan) might join their class, making it necessary for one of them to leave. They fight over who it should be.
26	4	"Child of the 60's"	Art Dielhenn	George Beckerman	October 14, 1987	17.8/28
Dennis holds a sit-in for better cafeteria food after Charlie teaches a lesson on the rebelliousness of the '60s.
27	5	"Trouble in Perfectville"	Art Dielhenn	George Beckerman	October 28, 1987	13.8/21
The class puts out a lampoon issue of the school newspaper, but a guy (Scotch Ellis Loring) threatens to get in between co-editors Darlene and Sarah.
28	6	"Coach Charlie"	Art Dielhenn	Phil Hahn & Jack Wohl	November 4, 1987	17.1/27
When Dr. Samuels is ejected from the meets, he gets Mr. Moore to take his place as coach. When the team is intimidated by a losing streak, Eric tries to be part of the solution instead of part of the problem.
29	7	"That'll Be the Day"	Art Dielhenn	Michael Elias & Rich Eustis	November 11, 1987	18.9/28
The class puts on Grease, but Alan is reluctant to participate.
30	8	"Poltergeist III"	Art Dielhenn	Bob Rosenfarb	November 18, 1987	17.5/28
Janice (who is now 11) says there is a poltergeist following her, and soon the class begins to believe her.
31	9	"Psyched Out at Fillmore"	Art Dielhenn	Mara Lideks	November 25, 1987	14.5/25
The class takes a standardized personality test and then worry about the results.
32	10	"Revenge of the Liberal"	Tony Singletary	Lisa Rosenthal	December 2, 1987	17.1/27
The rest of the IHP is worried when a talk show host (Kevin McCarthy) invites Dennis and they fear how he will represent them.
33	11	"Play it Again, Woody"	Art Dielhenn	Cynthia Thompson & Ray Jessel	December 9, 1987	13.5/21
Charlie and Arvid reflect on their love woes at a Woody Allen marathon going on at a movie theater.
34	12	"Will the Real Arvid Engen Please Stand Up?"	Art Dielhenn	Brian Robbins & Dan Schneider	January 6, 1988	17.3/25
Arvid sends his penpal (Suzanne Snyder) Eric's picture.
35	13	"On the Road Again"	Zane Buzby	Mark Fink	January 13, 1988	18.2/27
Darlene and Sarah buy a car; problems with Mrs. Samuels (Claudette Nevins) has Dr. Samuels rooming with Charlie.
36	14	"Fatal Distraction"	Art Dielhenn	George Beckerman & Larry Spencer	January 20, 1988	17.1/26
When Maria kisses him and Simone asks him out on the same day, Eric's imagination conjures up a Fatal Attraction-style scenario (egged on by Dennis).
37	15	"Cello Fever"	Art Dielhenn	Michael Elias & Rich Eustis	January 27, 1988	17.9/28
Janice tries to get first chair in the school orchestra.
38	16	"Parent's Day"	Art Dielhenn	Story by : Ramona Layman; Teleplay by : Ellis Bufton & Scott Glaze	February 3, 1988	17.8/28
The IHP's parents come to see how the class is taught, which highlights major problems within Eric's family (Dan Lauria, Patty McCormick).
39	17	"Love is Debatable"	Frank Cavestani	Ray Jessel & Cynthia Thompson	February 10, 1988	16.7/25
Darlene pretends to like Alan to win debates.
40	18	"For Better, For Worse"	Art Dielhenn	Lisa Rosenthal	March 2, 1988	16.9/25
Ms. Meara teaches a class on marriage. Nichelle Nichols makes a special cameo appearance.
41	19	"We Love You, Mrs. Russell"	Art Dielhenn	Story by : Jerry Rannow & Greg Strangis; Teleplay by : Jerry Rannow	March 9, 1988	19.4/31
Maria has difficulty coping with a popular teacher (Mary Carver) who has Alzheimer's disease.
42	20	"Don't Play With Matches"	Art Dielhenn	Jake Weinberger & Mike Weinberger	March 23, 1988	18.3/29
When Dennis matches Simone up with an awful computer date (Richard Horvitz), she can't get rid of the guy.
43	21	"The 21st-Century News"	Art Dielhenn	John Vorhaus	May 4, 1988	15.4/25
Dennis sees a bleak future.
44	22	"Moore Than You Know"	Alan Rosen	Alan Rosen	May 11, 1988	14.6/25
In an homage to It's A Wonderful Life, Charlie thinks he sees his dead uncle (Kenneth Mars), and considers quitting his teaching job, believing he isn't making a difference with his students.

=== Season 3 (1988–89) ===
No. overall	No. in season	Title	Directed by	Written by	Original release date	Viewers (millions)
45	1	"The Refrigerator of Fillmore High"	Lee Shallat	Story by : Leslie Ferreira; Teleplay by : Ellis Bufton & Scott Glaze	October 19, 1988	27.9
Dennis gets to play on the football team.
46	2	"Back in the U.S.S.R."	Art Dielhenn	Alan Rosen	October 26, 1988	28.2
Dennis hopes to use the upcoming IHP trip to Russia to profit by selling coveted Western goods, while Eric pretends to have disdain for the whole affair.
47	3	"Mission to Moscow"	Eric Laneuville	Michael Elias & Rich Eustis	November 2, 1988	26.1
48	4	"Mission to Moscow"	Eric Laneuville	Michael Elias & Rich Eustis	November 2, 1988	26.1
Part 1: In Moscow, Dr. Samuels insists on study for an academic meet, while Charlie pushes to let the IHP get out and learn about Russian culture. Part 2: Simone has an encounter at the grave of Anton Chekhov; Eric visits relatives; Dennis and Arvid are held up before the academic meet. The episode originally aired as a one-hour episode without a laugh track on ABC, but was later split into two parts and added a laugh track for syndication.
49	5	"Let's Rap"	Art Dielhenn	Lisa Rosenthal	November 9, 1988	27.5
When the class becomes peer counselors, Sarah has a challenging time with attitude-filled T.J. (Rain Pryor).
50	6	"Engen and Son"	Art Dielhenn	David Hurwitz	November 30, 1988	27.7
When a math teacher is injured, IHP gets a substitute, who turns out to be Arvid's father. The dad proves even more eggheaded than Arvid, and cannot relate to the students in mathematics.
51	7	"Get a Job"	Alan Rosen	Andy Guerdat & Steve Kreinberg	December 7, 1988	25.7
Dennis gets a job as a waiter to help pay off debts.
52	8	"Born to Run"	Lee Shallat	Jerry Rannow	January 4, 1989	29.5
Alan and Sarah are running for class president. When Alan considers stealing Sarah's proposals, Charlie warns him about emulating Richard Nixon. In a subplot, Arvid grows a mustache due to Dennis' formula.
53	9	"First Date"	Lee Shallat	Lisa Rosenthal	January 18, 1989	27.9
Eric and Simone go on their first date.
54	10	"Partners"	Lee Shallat	Story by : Lisa Rosenthal & Janet Coleman & David Dozer; Teleplay by : Ellis Bufton & Scott Glaze	January 25, 1989	26.5
Maria hides her intelligence from a hunk (Brad Pitt) she is dating, while Dennis tries to win an essay competition for the prize money.
55	11	"Arvid's Sure Thing"	Alan Rosen	Andy Guerdat & Steve Kreinberg	February 1, 1989	27.4
Arvid goes out with an easy girl (Christine Elise), which sparks a battle in his soul of temptation versus conscience.
56	12	"Scuttlebutt"	Lee Shallat	Ray Jessel & Cynthia Thompson	February 8, 1989	26.4
An accomplished journalist alumnus (Jack Gilford) visits.
57	13	"Little Shop 'Til You Drop (1)"	Art Dielhenn	Michael Elias & Rich Eustis	February 15, 1989	24.8
Approached to direct the school musical, Charlie proposes Little Shop of Horrors.
58	14	"Little Shop 'Til You Drop (2)"	Art Dielhenn	Michael Elias & Rich Eustis	February 22, 1989	23.0
As opening night approaches, a sick lead, a frustrated backup singer, and an uncast major part put the production in jeopardy. One student has the makings of a good Seymour for Little Shop, but the girl playing Audrey is unsure of the chemistry between her and the leading man - Arvid.
59	15	"The Hot Seat"	Alan Rosen	Valri Bromfield	March 1, 1989	25.7
The girls don't like their gym teacher (Valri Bromfield), but she likes Charlie.
60	16	"Radio Activity"	Art Dielhenn	Story by : Jay Wolf; Teleplay by : Larry Spencer	March 8, 1989	25.3
Charlie's efforts to broaden the audience and membership of the school's radio club tune out the original fans and its original member, Arvid. This episode was originally produced during season 2. (According to the Deseret News, this episode was set to premiere on January 11th, 1989 but was cancelled due to Ronald Reagan's farewell address.)
61	17	"The Little Sister"	Art Dielhenn	Andy Guerdat & Steve Kreinberg	March 15, 1989	24.8
Janice takes Dennis to small claims court for a ruined blouse; Charlie falls for Dr. Samuels' sister (Adrienne Barbeau).
62	18	"Killer Coach"	Tony Singletary	David Hurwitz	March 22, 1989	26.7
When Charlie badly beats Arvid in chess, he's set up in a match against the team's military-minded coach (Ray Buktenica) who has a long-standing grudge against him.
63	19	"I Am the King"	Art Dielhenn	Jerry Rannow	April 5, 1989	22.3
Charlie gets an acting gig, where he does a series of commercials for an electronics store. Dennis, who is watching a late night creature feature, sees one of these commercials and exposes his teacher. Charlie considers making this into a lesson about selling out, but reconsiders when he sees the owners of the store are decent business owners. This episode was originally produced during season 2 and is a nod to the WKRP in Cincinnati episode, 'Hold Up,' featuring the hold up man and similar appliance store.
64	20	"King of Remedial"	Art Dielhenn	Ray Jessel & Cynthia Thompson	April 26, 1989	21.3
Fed up with Dennis' constant gags, Charlie shows him the door - to a remedial history class, where Dennis becomes the inspirational leader for an academic meet against the IHP kids.
65	21	"Labor Daze"	Art Dielhenn	Jerry Rannow	May 3, 1989	18.3
A strike ironically leaves the IHP unprepared for a test on union history.
66	22	"Exactly Twelve O'Clock"	Alan Rosen	Alan Rosen	May 10, 1989	19.7
Arvid has visions of a High Noon scenario when challenged by a bully he wrote up for loitering.

=== Season 4 (1989–90) ===
No. overall	No. in season	Title	Directed by	Written by	Original release date	Viewers (millions)
67	1	"Back to School"	Lee Shallat	Rich Eustis & Michael Elias	September 27, 1989	26.3
It's the first day back, and there are some new changes to Charlie's class. Maria transferred to the High School of Performing Arts, Jawarlahal's family moved to California, and Janice went to Harvard. Taking their place are Alex Torres (Michael DeLorenzo), Aristotle McKenzie (De'voreaux White), and Viki Amory (Lara Piper) (who has crushes on her teachers).
68	2	"Viki & Eric & Simone & Alex"	Howard Storm	Andy Guerdat & Steve Kreinberg	October 4, 1989	25.5
Eric goes out with Viki, Simone goes out with Alex, and they all end up at the art museum.
69	3	"The Ring of Darlene M."	Lee Shallat	Story by : Jim Rogers & Ken Steele; Teleplay by : Jeffrey Duteil	October 11, 1989	26.5
Certain members of the class suspect Alex of stealing Darlene's antique ring.
70	4	"Viki in Love"	Lee Shallat	Ray Jessel & Cynthia Thompson	October 18, 1989	24.4
Viki believes she is in love with Charlie, but Alan believes she loves him.
71	5	"Blunden in Love"	Howard Storm	Sy Dukane & Denise Moss	October 25, 1989	23.7
Dennis falls for a girl (Kristine Blackburn), then later finds out that she is homeless.
72	6	"The Bright Stuff (Part 1)"	Alan Rosen	David Hurwitz	November 1, 1989	24.1
Arvid and Dennis' science project makes it into the NASA finals in Houston. One of the judges is Buzz Aldrin, who plays himself.
73	7	"The Bright Stuff (Part 2)"	Alan Rosen	David Hurwitz	November 8, 1989	22.6
Now in Texas, Arvid is having second thoughts about his project when Dennis continues hogging the spotlight.
74	8	"Gotta Dance"	Lee Shallat	Cathy Jung	November 15, 1989	23.2
Arvid replaces T.J. as Alex's dance partner.
75	9	"Good Mourning"	Lee Shallat	Bill Rosenthal & Noah Taft	November 22, 1989	18.9
Charlie teaches the class about grief when Sarah's grandmother and Arvid's dog die; T.J. tries to get Aristotle's attention.
76	10	"Arvid Nose Best"	Alan Rosen	Bill Rosenthal	November 29, 1989	24.0
Arvid considers having his nose surgically repaired to stop his snoring and to look better.
77	11	"The Devil and Miss T.J."	Lee Shallat	Lesa Kite & Cindy Begel	December 6, 1989	19.9
T.J. makes a deal with the devil (Richard Libertini) to get accepted into the IHP class.
78	12	"Why Ronnie Can't Read"	Alan Rosen	David Hurwitz & Jeffrey Duteil	December 13, 1989	21.8
The IHP students, especially Alex, try to help the school's star athlete (Christopher Birt) prepare for his college entrance exams.
79	13	"The Joker Is Wild"	Buzz Sapien	Story by : Debbie Pearl & Cassandra Clark; Teleplay by : Bill Rosenthal & Noah Taft	January 3, 1990	23.0
T.J.'s first assignment as the newest member of IHP is ridiculed by Dennis, so she challenges him to a fight.
80	14	"Tough Guys Don't Sew"	Howard Storm	Ursula Ziegler & Steven Sullivan	January 10, 1990	26.3
Viki gets Eric to design and sew clothes for her home economics project.
81	15	"Reel Problems"	Art Dielhenn	Shelly Goldstein	January 17, 1990	21.4
When Arvid tries to land a girl by being deceitful. Mr. Moore tells him of the time Arvid, in trying to impress a girl, claimed to be the head of school's "film society". (This episode was originally produced during season 3. It was edited for the fourth season. Alex, T.J., Viki and Aristotle do not appear in the episode, or in the credits. They appear in the beginning and appear in the end. Janice, Maria and Jawarhalal all appear in the episode and in the credits.)
82	16	"Alan Goes Crimson"	Howard Storm	Cindy Begel & Lesa Kite	January 24, 1990	23.1
Alan thinks he is getting early admission to Harvard, but when he doesn't receive it he's forced to eat the boastful words he dished out to his IHP classmates.
83	17	"From Hair to Eternity (Part 1)"	Art Dielhenn	Rich Eustis & Michael Elias	February 7, 1990	21.2
The prudish head of the school's English department (Elaine Stritch) seems determined to ruin Charlie's class production of Hair.
84	18	"From Hair to Eternity (Part 2)"	Art Dielhenn	Rich Eustis & Michael Elias	February 14, 1990	21.1
The class is rehearsing for Hair and now confident for opening night, but it may not be as English teacher Mrs. Hartman (Elaine Stritch) is looking to sabotage the production by giving students extra work, which cuts into their efforts.
85	19	"Recruitment Day"	Tony Singletary	Lisa Rosenthal	February 21, 1990	17.1
The class worries about college recruiters. (This episode was originally produced during season 3. Alex, T.J., Viki and Aristotle do not appear in the episode, or in the credits. Janice, Maria and Jawarhalal all appear in the episode and in the credits.)
86	20	"The Quiet Kid"	Lee Shallat	Ray Jessel & Cynthia Thompson	February 28, 1990	19.7
A new student, Jasper (Ke Huy Quan), rejects the Academic Olympics for his own reasons.
87	21	"Simone Goes Overboard"	Frank Cavestani	Steve Kreinberg & Andy Guerdat	March 14, 1990	22.1
Simone agrees to date Dennis after he saves her from drowning.
88	22	"Queen, Queen, Queen for a Day"	Bill Davis	Story by : Steven Dorfman; Teleplay by : Lesa Kite & Cindy Begel	March 21, 1990	20.0
Arvid soon regrets promising three beautiful girls his vote as queen at an upcoming dance.
89	23	"Politics of Love"	Art Dielhenn	Jerry Davis & David Boito	April 4, 1990	20.4
Alan dates a rich fashion model (Shari Shattuck). Charlie warns that such women can be self-absorbed, considering his boyhood crush on Rhonda Fleming.
90	24	"The Reel Charlie Moore"	Lee Shallat	Bill Rosenthal & Noah Taft	April 11, 1990	16.5
Aristotle tries to help Charlie's acting career.
91	25	"Cement Hi-Tops"	Buzz Sapien	Tom Chapman & Jonathan Torp	April 25, 1990	17.7
Aristotle videotapes a mob family wedding.
92	26	"Teacher's Pet"	Alan Rosen	Jeffrey Duteil	May 2, 1990	17.5
Charlie and Eric vie for a night-school teacher (Debra Sandlund).

=== Season 5 (1990–91) ===
No. overall	No. in season	Title	Directed by	Written by	Original release date	Viewers (millions)
93	1	"Where's Charlie?"	Howard Storm	Rich Eustis & Michael Elias	September 11, 1990	20.1
Senior Year continues with the IHP students getting a new teacher, Billy MacGregor (Billy Connolly), after Charlie lands a major acting gig and leaves; Dennis and Arvid butt heads comparing Billy and Mr. Moore.
94	2	"Twelve Angry Nerds"	Alan Rosen	Rich Eustis & Michael Elias	September 18, 1990	23.9
When Alan is caught cheating, Billy has the class act as a jury to decide his punishment.
95	3	"The Heartbreak Nerd"	Lee Shallat	Ursula Ziegler & Steven Sullivan	September 25, 1990	21.9
Arvid goes out with gorgeous Viki.
96	4	"And Then There Were None"	Frank Bonner	Michael Elias & Rich Eustis	October 2, 1990	21.3
Arvid's infectious flu may keep the class from performing in a Shakespeare competition.
97	5	"Getting Personal"	Alan Rosen	Danny Smith	October 9, 1990	27.8
Billy tries the personal ads.
98	6	"Napoleon Blown Apart"	Alan Rosen	Carol Corwen	October 16, 1990	23.6
Inspired by his French class, Eric goes to "find himself" in Paris.
99	7	"Billy's Big One"	Lee Shallat	Ursula Ziegler & Steven Sullivan	October 23, 1990	23.2
After Sarah tries to diagnose Billy, he fakes a heart attack to circumvent the health insurance bureaucracy; the IHP girls try writing a romance novel.
100	8	"Dead Men Don't Wear Pocket Protectors (Part 1)"	Lee Shallat	Andy Guerdat & Steve Kreinberg	October 30, 1990	21.8
After Billy is robbed, he has the class write papers on gun control, leading Arvid to a harrowing experience when he buys a gun for the assignment.
101	9	"Dead Men Don't Wear Pocket Protectors (Part 2)"	Lee Shallat	Andy Guerdat & Steve Kreinberg	November 6, 1990	21.8
Bully Zach (Jason Kristofer) may have Arvid's missing gun.
102	10	"Fillmore vs. Billy Jean's"	Art Dielhenn	Jeffrey Duteil	November 13, 1990	22.2
The IHP class behaves obnoxiously when their bus breaks down at a rural truck stop and they end up having an academic debate with the locals.
103	11	"Be My Baby ... Sitter"	Art Dielhenn	Tom Chapman & Jonathan Torp	November 20, 1990	23.3
Jasper's overprotective parents (Tzi Ma, Denice Kumagai) hire a babysitter for him - and to his mortification, it turns out to be Sarah.
104	12	"Dancing Fools"	Art Dielhenn	Andy Guerdat & Steve Kreinberg	November 27, 1990	20.9
Billy, Bernadette, and Simone take dance lessons at the studio where Alex teaches and where he believes he's being pursued by an older woman (Enid Kent).
105	13	"My Son the Primate"	Howard Storm	David Hurwitz	December 4, 1990	19.9
Arvid trains a chimp at his part-time pet store job and rather than let it be sold, he hides it in the classroom.
106	14	"The Importance of Being Alex"	Howard Storm	Carol Corwen	December 11, 1990	21.1
Simone's reputation suffers when Alex lies to his friends about a romance with her.
107	15	"Viki's Torn Genes"	Buzz Sapien	Bill Rosenthal & Noah Taft	December 18, 1990	21.1
At Christmas, Billy helps Viki find her birth mother (Cynthia Mace), but the woman doesn't want to see her.
108	16	"The Last Waltz"	Bill Davis	Bill Rosenthal & Noah Taft	January 8, 1991	22.3
T.J. turns down Aristotle's invitation to the senior prom.
109	17	"Most Likely to Be Forgotten"	Howard Storm	David Hurwitz, Ursula Ziegler & Steven Sullivan	January 15, 1991	20.8
The kids work on their yearbook, with Eric beginning to regret not having participated more extracurricularly.
110	18	"The Strange Case of Randy McNally"	Dwayne Hickman	Story by : Tom Chapman & Jonathan Torp; Teleplay by : Jeffrey Duteil	May 28, 1991	14.9
To save Dennis after a prank, Billy creates a fictional student - who apparently gets the MIT scholarship Dennis wanted; Alan has doubts about whether he'll measure up at Harvard.
111	19	"My Dinner With Darlene"	Renny Temple	Danny Smith	June 4, 1991	15.5
Darlene promises to treat the class to an elaborate farewell dinner, but then finds her credit card revoked.
112	20	"The Phantom of the Glee Club"	Robin Sack	David Hurwitz	June 11, 1991	14.8
The class learns T.J. is more than just a contemporary-style musician when Billy discovers her operatic talent.
113	21	"It Couldn't Last Forever (Part 1)"	Howard Storm	Ray Jessel & Jeffrey Duteil	June 18, 1991	15.2
With a wrecking ball ready to demolish the school, the IHP class waits to find out who is to be named valedictorian.
114	22	"It Couldn't Last Forever (Part 2)"	Howard Storm	Ray Jessel & Jeffrey Duteil & Andy Guerdat & Steve Kreinberg	June 25, 1991	14.5
The IHP class graduates as one of its own is named valedictorian.
