= William G. Schilling =

American actor (1939–2019)

- Born: August 30, 1939; Philadelphia, Pennsylvania, U.S.
- Died: February 28, 2019 (aged 79); Los Angeles, California, U.S.
- Occupation: Actor
- Years active: 1980–2011

William G. Schilling (August 30, 1939 – February 28, 2019) was an American actor of film and television. He played Dr. Harold Samuels on the television series Head of the Class between 1986 and 1991.

Schilling died on February 28, 2019, at age 79.

== Selected filmography ==
=== Film ===
Year	Title	Role	Notes
1980	The Island	Baxter	
1981	Rich and Famous	Doorman / Waldorf-Astoria	
1982	I, the Jury	Lundee	
1982	The King of Comedy	Man on Street	uncredited role
1983	Testament	Pharmacist	
1986	The Best of Times	Caribou #1	
1986	Fire with Fire	Watley	
1986	Ruthless People	Police Commissioner	
1987	White of the Eye	Harold Gideon	
1992	A Woman's Secret	Henry	
1993	In the Line of Fire	Sanford Riggs	
1993	For Their Own Good	George Buelton	
1994	Imaginary Crimes	Captain Lee	
1994	The Crazysitter	Dr. Wiles	
1995	Three Wishes	Doctor	
1996	Space Jam	Golfer	
1996	The Prince	Ed Bishop	
1999	Stealth Fighter	Harry Goldberg	
2001	Thank Heaven	Rex Brady	
2006	Glory Road	Iowa Announcer	

=== Television ===
Year	Title	Role	Notes
1982	Archie Bunker's Place	Locksmith	Episode: "The Night Visitor"
1982	Cassie & Co.	Sam Rossen	Episode: "Friend in Need"
1982	Diff'rent Strokes	Louis Garth	Episode: "Push Comes to Shove"
1982	M*A*S*H	Sgt. Jessup 'Jesse' McFarland	Episode: "Run for the Money"
1982–1983	Hill Street Blues	Bert Holland, Ernie	4 episodes
1984	The Jeffersons	Harold O'Steen	Episode: "What Makes Sammy Run?"
1986–1991	Head of the Class	Dr. Harold Samuels	114 episodes
1992–1993	Homefront	Joe, Barzizza	3 episodes
