= For Their Own Good =

1993 television movie

For Their Own Good is an American television movie of 1993, directed by Ed Kaplan and starring Elizabeth Perkins, Laura San Giacomo, and Charles Haid.

It was first broadcast on ABC on April 5, 1993.

== Story ==
A Texas corporation makes an aggressive demand of its female employees: they must choose between keeping their jobs and ever having children. They have handled toxic materials which can cause defects in unborn children, so they will be fired if they do not agree to be sterilized.

After public humiliation by the company, Sally Wheeler (Elizabeth Perkins) fights for justice. Wheeler also has to fight poverty and an abusive husband, then face divorce.

The film is based on a true story.

== Awards and nominations ==
For the film the director, Ed Kaplan, was nominated for a 1994 Humanitas Prize in the 90 minutes and longer category.

== Cast ==
- Elizabeth Perkins as Sally Wheeler
- Charles Haid as Hank
- Laura San Giacomo as Jo Mandell
- Gary Basaraba as Roy Wheeler
- CCH Pounder as Naomi Brinker
- Garette Ratliff Henson as Younger Jody
- Trey Ames as Older Jody
- Hansford Rowe as Dr. Gordon Barnes
- Thomas Kopache as Dr. Mason
- Kelli Williams as Erma
- Michael O'Neill as Clark Thompson
- David Graf as Miles
- Colleen Camp as Chris
- Lawrence Gamble as McCade Lawyer
- Glenn Morshower
- David Purdham as Jim Davis
- Richard Riehle as Dave Butler
- William G. Schilling as George Buelton
- Jessie Jones as Mrs Gates
- Matthew Glave as Mike Yates
- Hannah Eckstein as Georgia
- Jana Arnold as Marjorie
- John Lehne as Eugene Hansen
- Peggy Doyle as Leona
- Lorna Scott as Young Woman
