= Dating Games People Play =

- Directed by: Stefan Marc
- Written by: Stefan Marc
- Produced by: Stefan Marc
- Starring: Austin Peck; Leslie Bega
- Cinematography: Christos Bitsakos
- Edited by: Peck Prior; Mark Solomon; Sandy S. Solowitz
- Production company: Marc Entertainment
- Release date: 26 April 2005 (Newport Beach Film Festival)
- Running time: 95 minutes
- Country: United States
- Language: English

Dating Games People Play is a 2005 American drama film directed by Stefan Marc, starring Austin Peck and Leslie Bega.

== Cast ==
- Austin Peck as Nick Jenkins
- Leslie Bega as Mona Evans
- Stefan Marc as Jed Rollins
- Stephanie Brown as Robin Jaeger
- Clay Rivers as Vinnie
- Tamie Sheffield as Tiffany

== Release ==
The film premiered at the Newport Beach Film Festival on 20 April 2005.

== Reception ==
Don Houston of DVD Talk rated the film 3.5 stars out of 5 and called it a "witty little romantic comedy".

Craig Outhier of The Orange County Register called it a "cumbersome, aimless piece of low-browery".

Mark Olsen of the Los Angeles Times called the film "entirely unnecessary" and a "generic and uninvolving portrayal of life in Newport Beach".
