= Leslie Bega =

American actress

- Born: Leslie Rae Bega; April 17, 1967 (age 59); Los Angeles, California, U.S.
- Education: University of Southern California
- Occupation: Actress
- Years active: 1984–present

Leslie Rae Bega (born April 17, 1967) is an American actress, best known as Maria on Head of the Class (1986–1989), and Valentina La Paz on The Sopranos (2002–2004).

== Early life and education ==
Bega was born in Los Angeles to a Sephardi Jewish father and Russian Jewish mother. Her paternal grandparents came to the United States from Spain. In addition to English, Bega speaks Spanish and French fluently. After graduating as valedictorian from Lycée Français de Los Angeles, Bega attended the University of Southern California and got her degree in Cinema.

== Career ==
Bega is known for performances in Head of the Class as Maria Borges, David Lynch's Lost Highway, and as a recurring cast member in CSI: Crime Scene Investigation, C-16: FBI and The Sopranos as Valentina La Paz. She is also featured as a dancer in the breakdancing films Breakin and Breakin' 2: Electric Boogaloo. She played the role of Anna Lansky (née Sitrone) in 1991's Mobsters.

She has appeared as a guest star in the television shows 21 Jump Street, Beverly Hills, 90210, The Twilight Zone, and Highway to Heaven. Her theater work includes King Lear, at the Electric Theatre, The Merchant of Venice, Gypsy, Grease, The Sound of Music, and Maria in West Side Story at the Westchester Theatre.

In addition to acting, Bega works as a real estate agent in Beverly Hills, California.

== Filmography ==
=== Film ===
Year	Title	Role	Notes
1984	Breakin' 2: Electric Boogaloo	Dancer	
1985	Tuff Turf	Dancer	
1988	For Keeps	Carlita	
1991	Uncaged	Mickie	
1991	Mobsters	Anna Lansky	
1995	Get Shorty	Vikki Vespa	Uncredited
1995	The American President	White House Staffer Laura	
1996	Power 98	Denise	
1997	Lost Highway	Raquel	
1997	Against the Law	Lucia the Liquor Store Clerk	
2000	The Last Producer	Restaurant Manager	
2000	Time of Her Time	Denise Gondelman	
2005	Dating Games People Play	Mona Evans	
2019	Once Upon a Time in Hollywood	Cameo	Uncredited

=== Television ===
Year	Title	Role	Notes
1984	Silence of the Heart	Cindy	Television film
1985	The Twilight Zone	Girl	Episode: "Dead Woman's Shoes/Wong's Lost and Found Emporium"
1985	Hardcastle and McCormick	Betty	Episode: "You're Sixteen, You're Beautiful, and You're His"
1985	Highway to Heaven	Heather Fowler	Episode: "The Secret"
1986	Small Wonder	Mary	Episode: "The Older Woman"
1986–1989	Head of the Class	Maria Borges	68 episodes
1990	Freddy's Nightmares	Stacy	Episode: "Interior Loft Later"
1990	Beverly Hills, 90210	Marianne Moore	Episode: "Class of Beverly Hills"
1991	21 Jump Street	Stephanie 'Stevie' Plummer	Episode: "Under the Influence"
1995	SeaQuest DSV	Sandra Kirby	Episode: "And Everything Nice"
1997–1998	C-16: FBI	Laura Sandoval	4 episodes
1999	Martial Law	Didi Kirkus	Episode: "Trifecta"
2002–2003	CSI: Crime Scene Investigation	Leah	3 episodes
2002–2004	The Sopranos	Valentina La Paz	7 episodes
2005	CSI: NY	Grace Walderson	Episode: "The Dove Commission"
2007	Nip/Tuck	Photographer	Episode: "Joyce and Sharon Monroe"
2008	American Dad!	Ms. Anderson	Episode: "Pulling Double Booty"
2011	Bird Dog	Carmen	Television film
