= Art Dielhenn =

American television director

- Born: January 8, 1946 (age 79)
- Occupation: Television director
- Years active: 1978–1999

Art Dielhenn (born January 8, 1946) is an American television director.

Primarily working in sitcoms, some of his directing credits include The Cosby Show, A Different World, Punky Brewster, Free Spirit, Sister, Sister, Silver Spoons, Designing Women, Brotherly Love, Head of the Class and The Jamie Foxx Show. He began his career as an associate director on such shows as The Jeffersons and Diff'rent Strokes.

An alumnus of University of Wisconsin, after 1999, Dielhenn retired from the entertainment industry and has since been working as a career coach.
