= De'voreaux White =

American actor (born 1965)

- Born: Devorea W. Sefas; August 6, 1965 (age 61); Los Angeles County, California, U.S.
- Occupation: Actor
- Years active: 1977–present

De'voreaux White (born Devorea W. Sefas; August 6, 1965) is an American actor. He started his career as a child actor in the late 1970s, and may be best known for his role in Die Hard (1988) as the young limousine driver, Argyle.

== Career ==
=== Film and television ===
White began acting professionally at the age of ten.

His first bookings were The Jeffersons, Little House on the Prairie, and 1980's The Blues Brothers (as a would-be-shoplifter who is thwarted by a gun-toting Ray Charles). White also played one of the boys who attempt to keep a baseball in the Neil Simon movie Max Dugan Returns. In 1984, he played Wylie - who was lynched for accidentally shooting a white sheriff - in Places in the Heart. The movie received notice at the Academy Awards; White credits this role for providing an opportunity to read with producer Joel Silver and star Bruce Willis for Die Hard (1988). White filmed his scenes with Willis over a period of three months; some of their dialogue was improvised on the set.

White also starred in the television series Head of the Class as Aristotle McKenzie, and co-starred as a suicidal misfit who befriends Rick Schroder in 1989's Out on the Edge. In 1992, White played the role of Ice-T's drug-addicted younger brother in Walter Hill's Trespass. White appeared in the 2000 drama Shadow Hours.

White reprised his role as Argyle from Die Hard, with Willis, in a commercial for Advance Auto Parts' DieHard brand of car batteries in October 2020.

=== Other work ===
White set up his own company in California, helping people rehabilitate from substance-abuse. He also worked as clinical staff at the facility.

== Personal life ==
White was born in Los Angeles County, California, and as of 2019, he resided in Newport Beach, California. His original last name, Sefas, is Ethiopian; after his mother died, his maternal grandparents with the surname White adopted him.

== Filmography ==
=== Film ===
- 1979: Aunt Mary as Wally Hazel
- 1980: The Blues Brothers as Young Guitar Thief
- 1983: Max Dugan Returns as Boy
- 1984: Places in the Heart as Wylie
- 1988: Action Jackson as Clovis
- 1988: Die Hard as Argyle
- 1988: Split Decisions as Coop
- 1992: Trespass as "Lucky"
- 2000: Shadow Hours as Second Transvestite
- 2012: Sandbar as Charles Kendall

=== Television ===
- 1977: The Jeffersons as Warren Barnes
- 1979–1981: Little House on the Prairie as various characters
- 1981: Quincy, M.E. as Ethan Kellogg
- 1982: T.J. Hooker as Stevie Pine
- 1983–1984: Diff'rent Strokes as Glenn
- 1985: Highway to Heaven as Terry
- 1986: 227 as Harvey
- 1989: In the Heat of the Night as Albert Tolliver
- 1989: Out on the Edge as Lonnie
- 1989–1991: Head of the Class as Aristotle McKenzie
- 2014: Workaholics as Uber Driver
- 2023: Easter as Smiley
- 2023: Obliterated as Delray
