= Tannis Vallely =

American child actor and casting director (born 1975)

Tannis Kathleen Vallely (December 28, 1975 in New York City) is an American casting director and former child actress.

She played Zoé in the French film Une Femme ou Deux (English: One Woman or Two; 1985). She played Janice Lazzarotto on the ABC sitcom Head of the Class and Mary on 3-2-1 Contact.

She was a casting associate for X-Men Origins: Wolverine (2009) and Total Recall (2012) and casting director for 1600 Penn (2012–13) and Siren (2018-20).

== Personal life ==
Vallely graduated from Stanford University in 1997 with a psychology degree. She is the daughter of actress Myra Turley and producer/screenwriter Jim Vallely. Her uncle is writer and illustrator Bill Vallely. She married Jeremy Kromberg in 2004.
