= Head of the Class =

American television sitcom (1986–1991)

- Genre: Sitcom
- Created by: Michael Elias; Richard Eustis
- Starring: Howard Hesseman; William G. Schilling; Jeannetta Arnette; Leslie Bega; Dan Frischman; Robin Givens; Khrystyne Haje; Jory Husain; Tony O'Dell; Brian Robbins; Kimberly Russell; Dan Schneider; Tannis Vallely; Rain Pryor; Michael DeLorenzo; Lara Piper; Jonathan Ke Quan; De'voreaux White; Billy Connolly
- Theme music composer: Ed Alton
- Composer: Ed Alton
- Country of origin: United States
- Original language: English
- No. of seasons: 5
- No. of episodes: 114 (list of episodes)

Production
- Executive producers: Michael Elias; Rich Eustis
- Producers: Alan Rosen; Frank Pace; Larry Spencer
- Camera setup: Multi-camera
- Running time: 22–24 minutes
- Production companies: Eustis/Elias Productions; Warner Bros. Television

Original release
- Network: ABC
- Release: September 17, 1986 – June 25, 1991

Related
- Billy

Head of the Class is an American sitcom television series that ran from 1986 to 1991 on the ABC television network.

The series follows a group of gifted students in the Individualized Honors Program (IHP) at the fictional Millard Fillmore High School in Manhattan, and their history teacher Charlie Moore (Howard Hesseman). The program was ostensibly a vehicle for Hesseman, best known for his role as radio DJ Dr. Johnny Fever on the sitcom WKRP in Cincinnati (1978–1982). Hesseman left Head of the Class in 1990 and was replaced by Scottish comedian Billy Connolly as teacher Billy MacGregor for the final season.

The series was created and executive produced by Richard Eustis and Michael Elias. Elias had previously worked as a substitute teacher in New York City while hoping to become an actor.

A revival of the series was ordered and co-produced by Bill Lawrence's Doozer and Warner Horizon Scripted Television. It was released on HBO Max.

== Synopsis ==
Head of the Class is mainly set in the classroom of academically gifted high school students in the Individualized Honors Program (IHP) at Millard Fillmore High School in New York City. The IHP students comprised a diverse range of personalities, ethnicities and academic specialties.

For the first three years of the show, the IHP class had ten students. Arvid Engen (Dan Frischman) was a skinny, bespectacled nerd, mathematics expert, and budding scientist. Arvid's best friend was the overweight, wisecracking cynic Dennis Blunden (Dan Schneider), a computer whiz whose fields were chemistry and physics and who had a knack for getting the socially inept Arvid involved in various schemes. Both characters wanted to go to M.I.T. Alan Pinkard (Tony O'Dell) was an ultra-conservative preppy and egotist; his area of expertise was political science and he was a devout fan of Ronald Reagan. Alan competed for the highest grades in the class with Darlene Merriman (Robin Givens), a spoiled rich girl who was probably even more self-centered than Alan and whose specialties were speech and debate. Both Alan and Darlene held the ambition of being named class valedictorian. Sarah Nevins (Kimberly Russell) did not have any particular area of expertise; she was the most down-to-earth of the IHP class and was once cited as having the lowest G.P.A. Maria Borges (Leslie Bega) was the pretty girl, but intelligent, with some emotional and mental issues but was very passionate about getting A's (going as far as grounding herself in the pilot episode for getting a 'B'), and Jawaharlal Choudhury (Jory Husain aka Joher Coleman) was an exchange student from India whose expertise was natural science. Eleven-year-old Janice Lazarotto (Tannis Vallely), despite her young age, was in high school and the IHP class because of her advanced intellect. Arts student Simone Foster (Khrystyne Haje) was a quiet, sensitive redhead with a particular fondness for poetry. A notable development in the show was the relationship between Simone and Eric Mardian (Brian Robbins), an aspiring writer and, outwardly, the most unlikely member of the IHP. Eric wore black leather, rode a motorcycle, acted tough, and ostensibly disliked anything academic (to Dr. Samuels's delight, he was the only one in the class not on the academic team, although he would never leave the IHP). Eric constantly hit on Simone and the two eventually had an on-again-off-again romance.

There was some turnover in the cast in seasons four and five. Janice left for Harvard, Maria went to Performing Arts High School, and Jawaharlal moved to California with his family. New students included Aristotle McKenzie (De'voreaux White), described by Dennis as "this reject from Do the Right Thing" for his dreadlocks, Viki Amory (Lara Piper), a new-ager interested in quantum physics and skin-revealing clothing, and Alex Torres (Michael DeLorenzo), who had transferred from parochial school with a love for dance and an eye for the ladies (in particular, Simone and Viki). T.J. Jones (Rain Pryor), who had first appeared as a potential IHP member in season three, was eventually added to the program and the cast. Jasper Kwong (Ke Huy Quan) was introduced as a new transfer student late in season four.

Appearing as regulars throughout all five seasons were school administrators Dr. Harold Samuels (William G. Schilling) and Bernadette Meara (Jeannetta Arnette). Dr. Samuels was portrayed as the blustery, overweight principal of the school, who had an ambivalent view of the IHP students. While he distrusted them in general (exhibiting a particular antagonism toward Dennis and trying to avoid Eric as much as possible), he was proud of their achievements and the prestige they brought to the school. He also distrusted their teacher, Charlie Moore (Howard Hesseman), concerned that Charlie's methods – which often involved helping the IHP students branch out of their comfort zones and help them deal with the typical problems of kids their age, as well as using unorthodox methods of teaching the class subject at hand – might distract them too much from their studies. Ms. Meara was the level-headed assistant principal. There was some romantic tension between her and Mr. Moore, although this ultimately came to nothing.

The fifth and final season began with Mr. Moore no longer teaching at Fillmore High, having quit in order to pursue a career on Broadway. His successor was Billy MacGregor (Billy Connolly), a Scottish teacher who allowed his students to call him by his first name. Billy and Ms. Meara developed a romantic friendship over the course of the season, which covered the students' senior year; at its end, they graduated and the school was closed pending its demolition.

In the series, the students often faced off against the rival Bronx High School of Science. They also produced a series of musicals for the school, including Grease, Little Shop of Horrors, and Hair.

== Cast ==
=== Main ===
- Howard Hesseman – Charles P. "Charlie" Moore (seasons 1–4). A history and social studies teacher who teaches the honors program to intellectual geniuses and helps them aim for their dreams.
- William G. Schilling – Dr. Harold Samuels. The high school principal. He is Mr. Moore's boss, as well as a friend.
- Jeannetta Arnette – Bernadette Meara. The vice principal of the school who is friends with Charlie.
- Leslie Bega – Maria Borges (seasons 1–3)
- Dan Frischman – Arvid Engen
- Robin Givens – Darlene Merriman
- Khrystyne Haje – Simone Foster
- Joher Coleman (credited as Jory Husain) – Jawaharlal Choudhury (seasons 1–3)
- Tony O'Dell – Alan Pinkard
- Brian Robbins – Eric Mardian
- Kimberly Russell – Sarah Nevins
- Dan Schneider – Dennis Blunden
- Tannis Vallely – Janice Lazarotto (seasons 1–3; guest, season 5)
- Rain Pryor – Theola June "T.J." Jones (seasons 3–5)
- Michael DeLorenzo – Alex Torres (seasons 4–5)
- Lara Piper – Viki Amory (seasons 4–5)
- Ke Huy Quan (credited as Jonathan Ke Quan) – Jasper Kwong (seasons 4–5)
- De'voreaux White – Aristotle McKenzie (seasons 4–5)
- Billy Connolly – Billy MacGregor (season 5). Billy takes over Mr. Moore's class in season 5. He is from Scotland and, just like Mr. Moore, helps the students aim for their dreams.

=== Recurring ===
- Marcia Christie – Lori Applebaum. A pretty, bubbly student not in the IHP whom Arvid has a massive crush on. Seen in seasons 1 and 2, then reappears in the finale.
- Peter Vogt – Mr. Dorfman. A Fillmore High teacher who is somewhat self-centered and not especially respected. Appears occasionally in seasons 1-3, and reappears in the series finale.

Most of the students' parents were seen during the series, but usually in one episode apiece. Parents who appeared more than once included:

- Enid Kent – Maureen Foster (Simone's mother) (three episodes)
- J. Patrick McNamara – Mr. Foster (Simone's father) (two episodes)
- Bruce Gray – Dr. Enric Engen (Arvid's father) (two episodes)

== Season synopses ==
=== Season 1 (1986–1987) ===
Out-of-work actor Charlie Moore began the first season as a substitute teacher, but warmed to the IHP class immediately, making it his mission to get them to think rather than merely to know. Although they are gifted academically, the IHP students had plenty of problems in their personal lives, and Mr. Moore not only is there to listen, he shows an ability to get the students to solve their own problems while making it seem like they came up with the answers on their own. By Episode 6 ("Teacher's Teacher"), the class's original teacher Mr. Thomas (Roscoe Lee Browne) had returned to Fillmore High, seemingly ready to return to the IHP class once Mr. Moore's tenure ended. After observing Mr. Moore's unorthodox teaching methods for most of the episode (much to Charlie's chagrin, as it also made apparent how much he would miss the IHP students), Mr. Thomas ultimately reveals he had no intention to return but came to observe Mr. Moore after hearing concerns about him from Dr. Samuels. Seeing Mr. Moore in action, Mr. Thomas gives him his blessing, leaving Mr. Moore to become their full-time teacher, knowing the IHP will be in good hands. Throughout the first season, Mr. Moore attempted to get the class involved in more than just their studies, encouraging them to play volleyball and make a music video for the school's time capsule (this marks the first foray into the fondness of Head of the Class for musical production numbers). At the same time, the class brought Mr. Moore into the present, acclimating him to the importance of personal computers. Near the end of the season, the IHP faces their Russian counterparts in an academic tournament, foreshadowing their famous trip to Moscow in season three.

=== Season 2 (1987–1988) ===
Season 2 began involving the IHP in the school as a whole, with Mr. Moore involving the class in the school literary journal and encouraging a lampoon of the school newspaper. Mr. Moore also decides to put on a school production of the musical Grease, and encourages the IHP (who are initially reluctant) to participate, alongside other Fillmore students.

While first season had some episodes that showed Charlie's personal life outside school, these become increasingly rare as the series continues. In season 2 (and thereafter), episodes consistently focus on the lives of the IHP students, with only a very few focusing specifically on Charlie; this is the last season in which we see Charlie's apartment.

=== Season 3 (1988–1989) ===
==== "Mission to Moscow" ====
In 1988, Head of the Class broke new ground as it became the first American sitcom to be filmed in the Soviet Union with an episode filmed entirely in Moscow.

The IHP is invited to come to the country for a rematch of the academic meet that happened in season one, which ended in a tie. The class has a lot of experiences while in Moscow: Dennis and Arvid take an interest in two beautiful women, until they realise they might be KGB spies; Eric meets up with his relatives in what is a very positive experience for him; capitalist Alan has an argument with a die-hard socialist in a store (who is also on the opposing Russian academic team); Sarah and Darlene decide to record the sights and sounds of Moscow; Simone goes to put flowers on a poet's grave and meets up with a charming Russian musician; Dr. Samuels believes that his hotel room is bugged, but ends up making a fool of himself; and Charlie has a brief romance with a schoolteacher.

The IHP eventually wins the meet and the respect of the Russian team. The episode concludes with both teams attending a concert in Gorky Park swaying to the song "Far Away Lands" (written and performed by American David Pomeranz and Russian rock star Sasha Malinin).

=== Season 4 (1989–1990) ===
The fourth season saw some significant changes to the cast of characters. Maria went to a performing arts school, Jawaharlal moved to California, and Janice went to Harvard as a sophomore. Several new characters took their place: Alex Torres (Michael DeLorenzo) was a Hispanic athletics student whose specialty was history, portrayed as having an eye for the ladies. Although Alex seemed attracted to Darlene particularly, both he and Eric competed for the affection of Simone and another new IHP student, the blonde hippie Viki Amory (Lara Piper). Another new character was aspiring filmmaker Aristotle McKenzie (De'voreaux White). T.J. Jones (Rain Pryor), a recurring character since the third season, joined the IHP in the fourth season (a remedial student with a streetwise attitude, T.J. was found to be smart enough to join the IHP). Also, the character of Jasper Kwong (Ke Huy Quan) was added to the IHP class late in the season. The season also showed them film a two-part episode at the NASA Johnson Space Center in Houston, Texas. The students' final year of high school was split over seasons four and five. Howard Hesseman left the show after the fourth season. As Hesseman noted in a 1989 interview, "We're not doing the show that I was led to believe I'd do, and it's difficult for me to get off that."

=== Season 5 (1990–1991) ===
In the first episode of season 5, Scottish teacher Billy MacGregor (Billy Connolly) arrived to replace the departed Charlie Moore (in the first episode of the season, it is explained to the dismayed IHP students that Mr. Moore's acting career finally took off). Despite initial uncertainty and some hostility from the students, Billy proved to be a successful replacement for Charlie. He usually comes into the class bringing his bike. He insisted that the students refer to him by his first name, and although he was more rousing and less laid-back than his predecessor, he proved to be just as wise and caring (Billy also had a habit of boisterously greeting his class every morning with the phrase, "good morning, geniuses", and facetiously barking to his students to, "get out of here", when the bell rang at the end of the class. He also taught his class in a manner more akin to a stand-up comedian than a teacher). Many episodes from this season focused on Billy having to adapt to living in America and his attempts to romance Ms. Meara. Other aspects of Billy were his dislike of an outdated French textbook, which actually prompted one student to take a spur-of-the-moment jaunt to Paris, and his encouragement to the male students that the best way to get girls was to be themselves. The season (and the program itself) concluded with the IHP students graduating from high school. Janice Lazarotto (from seasons one–three) returned for a guest appearance in the finale, in which T.J. is named class valedictorian and the school is closed down and demolished.

== Episodes ==
Season	Episodes	Originally released		Rank	Rating
Season	Episodes	First released	Last released	Rank	Rating
1	22	September 17, 1986	May 6, 1987	30	16.4
2	22	September 23, 1987	May 11, 1988	23	16.7 (Tied with The NBC Sunday Night Movie)
3	22	October 19, 1988	May 10, 1989	20	17.1
4	26	September 27, 1989	May 2, 1990	26	14.8
5	22	September 11, 1990	June 25, 1991	26	14.5

== Novel tie-in ==
One major novelization was released, with the plot lines based on six episodes of the show. The book makes all the chapters flow together as one story, even though they didn't happen seqentially on the show. It was written by Susan Beth Pfeffer and released in December 1989 by Bantam Books. The book is 120 pages, with six chapters, each based on a different episode.

- Chapter 1 – "First Day", based on the 1986 episode written by Lisa Rosenthal (otherwise known as the pilot)
- Chapter 2 – "A Problem Like Maria" is based on the 1986 episode written by Cynthia Thompson
- Chapter 3 – "Crimes of the Heart" is based on the 1987 episode written by Valri Bromfield
- Chapter 4 – "Cello Fever" is based on the 1987 episode written by show creators Rich Eustis and Michael Elias
- Chapter 5 – "Trouble in Perfectville" is based on the 1987 episode written by George Beckerman
- Chapter 6 – "Parents Day" is based on the 1987 episode written by Ellis Bufton and Scott Glaze

All copyrights belong to Warner Bros. The novelization erroneously credits "First Day" as having been made in 1988 rather than 1986.

== Spin-off ==
A year after Head of the Class left the air, Billy Connolly reprised the role of Billy MacGregor for a short-lived spin-off series, Billy.

== Revival ==
In May 2020, a revival of the series was ordered, co-produced by Bill Lawrence's Doozer and Warner Horizon Scripted Television. The order includes a pilot episode plus five additional scripts and will air on HBO Max. In March 2021, it was announced that a 10-episode first season was officially greenlit. In October 2021, a first look clip was released, with a November 4, 2021, series premiere date attached. In December 2021, the series was canceled after one season.

=== Casting ===
In November 2020, it was reported that Isabella Gomez was cast in the lead role as teacher Alicia Adams. Coincidentally, Gomez and Howard Hesseman (who played Charlie Moore in the original series' first four seasons), had both starred on the television series One Day at a Time, with Hesseman starring in the original series' final two seasons as Barbara Cooper's father-in-law Sam Royer, while Gomez starred in the 2017 reboot as Elena Alvarez. Producers also announced that Watchmen actress Jolie Hoang-Rappaport would join the cast as student Makayla Washington. In December 2020, producers also announced that Little Fires Everywhere actor Gavin Lewis will join the cast as student Luke Burrows. In January 2021, Jorge Diaz, Dior Goodjohn, Brandon Severs, Adrian Matthew Escalona and Christa Miller joined the cast. The October first look revealed that Givens would be reprising her role as Darlene from the original series.

== Home media and syndication ==
Head of the Class has appeared infrequently in syndicated reruns, airing on local stations and then briefly on TBS in September 1993 until November 1993 returning August 1996 until September 1996 weekday mornings, and on Nick at Nite in the early 2000s. Antenna TV began airing the series in January 2018 until it was removed in August 2021. It has since returned to Antenna in January 2026. In February 2020, the show was streaming on The Roku Channel. The show was also streaming on Max, The Roku Channel, Freevee and it currently airs on Rewind TV, as of the channel's launch on September 1, 2021.

Beginning in 2023, the series began streaming on Warner Bros. Television All Together Now channel.

In 2020, Warner Bros. announced that season 1 of Head of the Class would be released as a "manufacture on demand" (MOD) DVD by Warner Archive, starting on June 9, 2020. The show had previously not seen any release on home media. The show had multiple musical episodes, thereby making music rights licensing difficult, a common problem when preparing series for home release. Another series, WKRP in Cincinnati (also starring Hesseman), encountered similar issues.

The Season 2 DVD set included season three episodes "Radio Activity" and "I Am the King," because they were originally made during the second season. The Season 3 DVD set not only have "Radio Activity" and "I Am the King" in their release order, it also included season four episodes "Reel Problems" and "Recruitment Day," which were originally made during the third season.

DVD Season	Ep #	Release date
Season 1	22	June 9, 2020
Season 2	24	October 27, 2020
Season 3	24	July 20, 2021
Season 4	24	March 15, 2022
Season 5	22	TBA

== International broadcasts ==
- In Canada, the series was simulcast on the Global Television Network throughout its original run. In Atlantic Canada, the series aired on ATV and ASN as there was no Global station in Atlantic Canada at that time.
- In Australia, the series aired on the Nine Network.
- In the UK the show aired on BBC One.
- In Ireland the series aired on RTÉ One.
- In Indonesia, it was aired by RCTI.
- In Italy, the series under the title Segni particolari: genio (Distinguishing features: genius) arrived in 1989 and first season was aired by Telemontecarlo. Then it was aired by Italia 1, from 1992 to 1993.
- In Mexico, the series aired on Televisa between 1994 and 1996, under the name Mi Profesor Favorito (My Favorite Teacher).
- In Latin America, the series aired on Warner Channel during mid-late 1990s.
- In Chile, the series aired on TVN.
- In Brazil, the series aired on SBT between 2005 and 2006, under the name "Uma turma genial" (A brilliant class).
- In New Zealand, the series aired on TVNZ 1.
- In France, the series aired on Canal+ (French TV channel) and France 2 from 1986 to 1993, under the name "Sois prof et tais—toi!" (Be a Teacher and Shut Up!).
