= Hanna Fenichel Pitkin =

American political theorist (1931–2023)

- Born: July 17, 1931; Berlin, Germany
- Died: May 6, 2023 (aged 91); Berkeley, California, U.S.
- Spouse: John Schaar (died 2011)
- Awards: Skytte Prize (2003)

Academic background
- Education: University of California, Los Angeles; University of California, Berkeley (MA, PhD)
- Thesis: The Theory of Political Representation (1961)
- Influences: Karl Marx, Ludwig Wittgenstein, Stanley Cavell

Academic work
- Discipline: Political science
- Sub-discipline: Political theory
- School or tradition: Berkeley school
- Institutions: University of California, Berkeley (PhD)
- Doctoral students: Mary G. Dietz; David Laitin; Lisa Wedeen
- Notable works: The Concept of Representation (1967)
- Influenced: Alice Crary

Hanna Fenichel Pitkin (July 17, 1931 – May 6, 2023) was an American political theorist best known for her seminal study The Concept of Representation (1967).

Pitkin's diverse interests ranged from the history of European political thought from ancient to modern times, through ordinary language philosophy and textual analysis, to issues of psychoanalysis and gender in political and social theory. Due to her various publications and mentorship, Pitkin is a recipient of the Johan Skytte Prize in Political Science and has been recognized as Professor Emerita at UC Berkeley.

== Biography ==
Pitkin was born on July 17, 1931 to Otto Fenichel, and Clare (née Nathansohn). In 1940, Otto Fenichel married Hanna Fenichel, a psychoanalyst, who became Pitkin's stepmother.

Born in Berlin, Pitkin and her parents fled Nazi Germany in 1933 to Oslo, later moving to Prague in 1935. At nearly seven years old, Pitkin's family emigrated to Los Angeles with other German-Jewish refugees. Pitkin cites her past as a refugee to be the origin of her interest in political science and political theory, as she was surrounded by political conversations during her childhood. Pitkin's role as a teacher developed throughout her life, beginning with assisting in her mother's home-run nursery as a child. For her first job, Pitkin tutored a student in math, and she later became a teaching assistant in graduate school.

After completing her first year of graduate schooling at University of California, Los Angeles (UCLA), Pitkin received her doctoral degree in Political Science at University of California, Berkeley (UC Berkeley). In 1966, she began her career teaching political science at UC Berkeley where she later became recognized as Professor Emerita for her impact as a teacher and mentor. In 1982, Pitkin received UC Berkeley's Distinguished Teaching Award. Pitkin retired as a professor in 1997 while remaining a mentor for graduate students.

Pitkin was the first woman in her alma mater's Political Science department to enter the tenure track and was once the sole woman to hold a prominent position in a university committee.

Pitkin married political theorist John Schaar.

Pitkin died on May 6, 2023, at the age of 91.

== Books ==
Pitkin's books were The Concept of Representation (1967), Wittgenstein and Justice (1972, 1984, 1992), and Fortune Is a Woman: Gender and Politics in the Thought of Niccolò Machiavelli (1984, 1999), in addition to numerous articles and edited volumes. In 1998 she published The Attack of the Blob: Hannah Arendt's Concept of "the Social". A wide selection of her writings is collected and thematized in Hanna Fenichel Pitkin: Politics, Justice, Action (2016).

=== The Concept of Representation ===
The Concept of Representation (1967), Pitkin's first book and most notable publication, is derived from her dissertation. The Concept of Representation describes types of formalistic, descriptive, symbolic, and substantive representation which shape the way humans perceive the social and political world around them. Although modern "representation" is associated with democracy, Pitkin believes its historical, political, linguistic, and philosophical contexts must be studied to understand how the concept has evolved. Despite arguments to discard the word due to its ambiguity, Pitkin advocates accepting representation as a large concept with various meanings. In The Concept of Representation (1967), the word "representation" is evaluated beyond a political context. Pitkin recognizes that inanimate objects may "represent" by standing for an idea just as political figures may "represent" through acting for a body of citizens. Because representation is a human-made concept, many have differing opinions of its meaning. Pitkin questions when one is represented, and when one should feel that they are represented. Chapters 6-9 introduce and evaluate the controversy of political representation through the ideas of Edmund Burke and Liberalism. Influences for The Concept of Representation are noted to be Sheldon Wolin, Stanley Cavell, and Thomas P. Jenkin.

=== Fortune is a Woman: Gender and Politics in the Thought of Niccoló Machiavelli ===
Fortune is a Woman: Gender and Politics in the Thought of Niccoló Machiavelli (1984, 1999) seeks to examine both the political thought of Niccolò Machiavelli, a controversial Italian political theorist, and the broader interactions of political humans. Pitkin uses Machiavelli's works The Prince and The Discourses on the First Ten Books of Titus Livius to create a relationship between Machiavelli's thought and human political life. Pitkin's title is inspired by The Prince, where Machiavelli personifies fortune as a metaphor to describe the success, autonomy, and power of a man in civil society. Manhood and autonomy are the two main points of controversy through which Pitkin evaluates Machiavelli's political teachings. Pitkin views autonomy, rather than authority, as a paradox which challenged political life and later family relationships shaped through the Renaissance. Ultimately, this concept is used to make sense of the inconsistencies in Machiavelli's writings. Although many view Machiavelli as evil, Pitkin examines his teachings with ambivalence. Machiavelli served in office in Florence during the late fifteenth and early sixteenth centuries in what was known to be one of the most politically active societies in Europe. This historical period during the Renaissance raised questions about laws, manhood, dependence, and citizenship. Because of this, Machiavelli's ideals became rooted in misogyny and militarism, which Pitkin views as problematic. Because Machiavelli views femininity as a threat to male autonomy, Pitkin analyzes the relationship between gender and politics. In the book, Pitkin first seeks to answer questions of threatening women and later evaluates Machiavelli's misogyny in the book's final section.

== Perspective on Niccoló Machiavelli ==
Niccoló Machiavelli is evaluated by Pitkin in Fortune is a Woman: Gender and Politics in the Thought of Niccoló Machiavelli (1984, 1999). Ultimately, Pitkin believes that he is a republican and a protofascist. Pitkin approaches Machiavelli with ambivalence, believing that he is controversial but also misunderstood. Although Machiavelli publishes works during the Renaissance, Pitkin believes that Machiavelli is misogynistic and patriarchal because his main concern of manhood bleeds into both public and private human relations. Pitkin considers and accepts Machiavelli's language as inherently sexual, but disagrees with its provocativity. Pitkin aims to use rather than argue against Machiavelli's political thought to understand human political interactions.

== Critics ==
=== The Concept of Representation ===
Critics of The Concept of Representation (1967) argue that Pitkin approaches the issue of representation from the wrong angle. It is argued that Pitkin's dependence on linguistics is not what makes her argument sound, but rather her knowledge as a political theorist. Additionally, Pitkin's criticisms of Thomas Hobbes are argued against, as she believes that Hobbes offers only partial representation through authorizing one sovereign to act for its people. Since the agreement between the representative sovereign and the represented society is not broken, this form of representation is sufficient. In addition to Pitkin's linguistic knowledge, it is also claimed that Pitkin expects all readers to have extensive background knowledge in political philosophy, omitting explanations of advanced topics. In these political explanations, it is believed that Pitkin relies on mistaken assumptions: Pitkin first assumes the parallel between British and American political experiences and also neglects the role of workers' unions in modern societies as a means for representation. Overall, critics claim that Pitkin omits key facets of representation in its many forms.

=== Fortune is a Woman: Gender and Politics in the Thought of Niccoló Machiavelli ===
Critics of Pitkin in Fortune is a Woman: Gender and Politics in the Thought of Niccoló Machiavelli (1984, 1999) disagree with Pitkin's assessment of Machiavelli's misogyny for a variety of reasons. It is claimed that Pitkin's argued thesis is repetitive and rigid, ultimately weakening her argument. In her arguments, Pitkin does not acknowledge that the Italian language, which Machiavelli wrote in, did not include gender neutral terms, making Machiavelli seem more patriarchal than he was. In Pitkin's rigid, feminist stance against Machiavelli guided by psychoanalysis, it can also be argued that her theory is misleading and utopian because it does not consider the historical period of Machiavelli's writings. Opposing arguments, rather than viewing Pitkin as being too rigid, believe Pitkin excuses Machiavelli's misogyny through evaluations of Machiavelli only at his best moments. Although all critics comment upon Pitkin's assessment of Machiavelli's misogyny, they take various stances.

== Awards and legacy ==
In 2003, she was awarded the Johan Skytte Prize in Political Science "for her groundbreaking theoretical work, predominantly on the problem of representation". This has been awarded to twenty five recipients since its creation in 1995. As of 2025, only eight of these twenty five recipients have been women. Some of her students are noteworthy political scientists such as David Laitin (Stanford University), Dan Avnon (Hebrew University, Jerusalem), Lisa Wedeen (University of Chicago), and Mary G. Dietz (Northwestern University).

Awards
Preceded by Sidney Verba	Johan Skytte Prize in Political Science; 2003	Succeeded by Jean Blondel
