= Mary G. Dietz =

American academic (born c. 1951)

Mary Dietz
- Born: Mary Golden Dietz c. 1951 (age 74–75)

Education
- Education: Mount Holyoke College, University of California, Berkeley

Philosophical work
- Era: Contemporary philosophy
- Region: American philosophy
- Institutions: Northwestern University
- Main interests: Political philosophy, feminist theory, history of philosophy

Mary Golden Dietz (born c. 1951) is the John Evans Emerita Professor of Political Theory at Northwestern University. She holds a joint appointment in Northwestern's Department of Political Science and its Gender and Sexuality Studies Program. She is the author of many books and articles in feminist theory and the history of philosophy and her work has been translated into French, Spanish, Czech, Turkish, and Japanese. She edited the journal Political Theory from 2005 to 2012. Prior to joining the faculty at Northwestern in 2007, she taught at the University of Minnesota. She announced her retirement in 2022, after which Northwestern named her Professor Emerita.

== Education ==
Dietz graduated Magna Cum Laude from Mount Holyoke College in 1972 with a degree in political science. She did her master's and doctoral work at the University of California, Berkeley during the era of the Berkeley School of political theory when political theorists Hanna Pitkin, Michael Rogin, and Norman Jacobson were all working at Berkeley. While there she developed an interest in the work of Hannah Arendt through graduate seminars with Pitkin. She obtained her PhD in 1982. Her dissertation project was a critical reconstruction and interpretation of the political thought of the French mystic Simone Weil, who she encountered in the New York Review of Books referenced as "the 'other' most famous 'female philosopher' of the twentieth century." This research became her first book Between the Human and the Divine: The Political Thought of Simone Weil (1988). Dietz's study of Weil was one of the first works dealing explicitly with the political aspects of Weil's thinking, and is also noted for her use of psychoanalysis and her incorporation of feminist theory into Weil studies.

== Selected bibliography ==
=== Books ===
- Between the Human and the Divine: the Political Thought of Simone Weil (Totowa, NJ: Rowman & Littlefield, 1987)
- Turning Operations: Feminism, Arendt, and Politics (New York: Routledge, 2002)

=== Edited books ===
- Thomas Hobbes and Political Theory (Lawrence, KS: University Press of Kansas, 1990)

=== Selected articles ===
- “Citizenship with a Feminist Face: The Problem with Maternal Thinking.” Political Theory 13, no. 1 (1985): 19–37.
- “Trapping the Prince: Machiavelli and the Politics of Deception.” The American Political Science Review 80, no. 3 (1986): 777–99.
- “Context Is All: Feminism and Theories of Citizenship.” Daedalus 116, no. 4 (1987): 1–24.
- "Debating Simone de Beauvoir.” Signs: Journal of Women in Culture and Society 18, no. 1 (1992): 74–88.
- “‘The Slow Boring of Hard Boards’: Methodical Thinking and the Work of Politics.” The American Political Science Review 88, no. 4 (1994): 873–86.
- “Current Controversies in Feminist Theory.” Annual Review of Political Science 6, no. 1 (2003): 399–431.
- “Between Polis and Empire: Aristotle’s Politics.” The American Political Science Review 106, no. 2 (2012): 275–93.
- “Lying as Politics in the Age of Trump.” Public Seminar, October 23, 2018, https://publicseminar.org/2018/10/lying-as-politics-in-the-age-of-trump/.
