= Wolin (disambiguation) =

Wolin is a Polish island in the Baltic Sea

Wolin may also refer to:

== Place ==
- Wolin (town)

== People ==
- Sheldon Wolin, American political theorist
