= Berkeley school of political theory =

The Berkeley school of political theory is a school of thought in political theory associated originally with the work of faculty at the University of California, Berkeley, some of whom formulated and popularized its ideas. The school of thought was founded by Sheldon Wolin, Hanna Pitkin, Michael Rogin, John Schaar, and Norman Jacobson, among others, and has been carried on by theorists including Wilson Carey McWilliams, Mary G. Dietz, Linda M.G. Zerilli and J. Peter Euben.

The Berkeley school has been characterized as returning political theory back in the direction of politics and political action, and away from efforts to center "scientific" models such as economics, psychology, sociology, and the natural sciences, specifically behavioralism and evolutionary psychology.

Hanna Pitkin herself disputed the existence of the Berkeley school as a school of thought, citing substantial differences between theoretical approaches. In particular, Pitkin took issue with the idea that Sheldon Wolin's views on political theory as a discipline and politics as a practice were representative of the perspectives of the political theorists often grouped in the Berkeley school.
