= Kanchan Chandra =

Political scientist (born 1971)

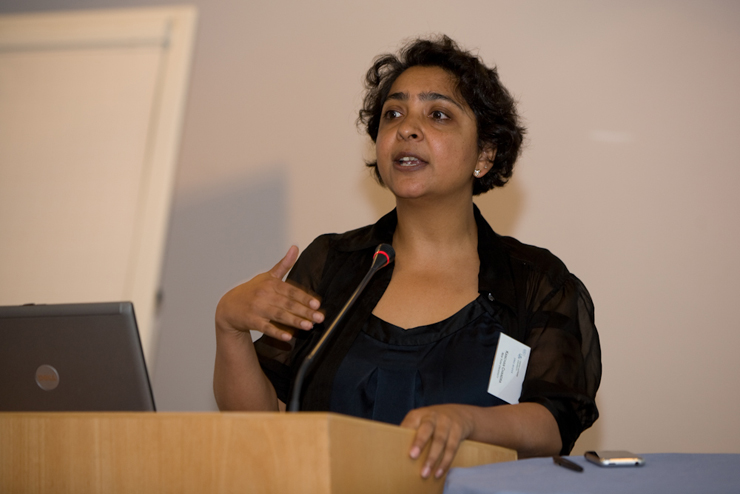
- Born: 20 January 1971 (age 55); India
- Citizenship: United States

Academic background
- Education: Dartmouth College (BA); Harvard University (PhD)

Academic work
- Discipline: Political science
- Sub-discipline: Comparative politics
- Institutions: Massachusetts Institute of Technology; New York University
- Main interests: Democracy, Constructivism, Ethnic politics

Kanchan Chandra (born 20 January 1971) is a political scientist who is currently Professor of Politics at New York University. She has made significant research contributions on a range of subjects in political science including comparative ethnic politics, constructivism, democratic theory, intrastate conflict, patronage and clientelism, and South Asian politics.

Chandra graduated from Dartmouth College in 1993, and earned a Ph.D. degree from Harvard University in 2000. She was a faculty member in the political science department at MIT from 2000 to 2005 before joining the NYU Politics Department in 2005.

Chandra is the recipient of fellowships and awards from the National Science Foundation, John Simon Guggenheim Memorial Foundation, Russell Sage Foundation, and SSRC-MacArthur Foundation.

Chandra is the author of Why Ethnic Parties Succeed: Patronage and Ethnic Headcounts in India, which was published by Cambridge University Press in 2004 and has since been very widely cited. She is also the editor of Constructivist Theories of Ethnic Politics (2012) and Democratic Dynasties: State, Party and Family Politics in India (2016). She has published numerous academic articles.
