= David D. Laitin =

American political scientist (1945-)

David Laitin
- Born: David Dennis Laitin; 1945 (age 80–81)
- Education: Swarthmore College (BA); University of California, Berkeley (MA, PhD)
- Awards: Johan Skytte Prize in Political Science (2021)
- Scientific career
- Workplaces: Stanford University
- Doctoral advisor: Ernst B. Haas
- Other academic advisors: Hanna Pitkin
- Doctoral students: Stathis Kalyvas

David D. Laitin (born in 1945) is the James T. Watkins IV and Elise V. Watkins Professor of Political Science in the School of Humanities and Science at Stanford University. He is a comparative politics scholar who has written works on civil war, ethnic identity, culture and nationalism. He is known for his application of rational choice to the study of ethnic conflict, and for bridging a gap between ethnography and rational choice.

He was awarded the Johan Skytte Prize in 2021. He is an elected member of the National Academy of Sciences. Before joining Stanford University, he was a professor in the political science department at the University of Chicago.

In 1986, he published a book about the Yoruba in Nigeria, Hegemony and Culture: The Politics of Religious Change Among the Yoruba. Laitin studied Russian and lived with a Russian family in Estonia for a year. The experiences formed the basis of his 1998 book Identity in Formation: The Russian-Speaking Populations in the Near Abroad. In the 1990s and 2000s, Laitin published several highly influential works on ethnicity with James Fearon.

== Early life and education ==
Laitin was born in Brooklyn, New York in 1945. He grew up in a Jewish family in Flatbush, Brooklyn. He is the grandson of émigrés from Russia and Austria. In 1967, he was awarded an undergraduate degree from Swarthmore College. While at Swarthmore, he took a class alongside fellow students Margaret Levi and Peter Katzenstein, who would both go on to become prominent political scientists.

He received his Ph.D. in Political Science from University of California at Berkeley, where he did his dissertation under the guidance of Ernst Haas, Hanna Pitkin, and Kenneth Waltz. During his time at Berkeley, Laitin served with the Peace Corps in Somalia and Grenada. Laitin has said that this decision was in part motivated by seeking to avoid the Vietnam draft. Laitin's experiences in Somalia influenced his dissertation and his 1977 book Politics, Language and Thought: The Somali Experience.
