= Margaret Levi =

American political scientist

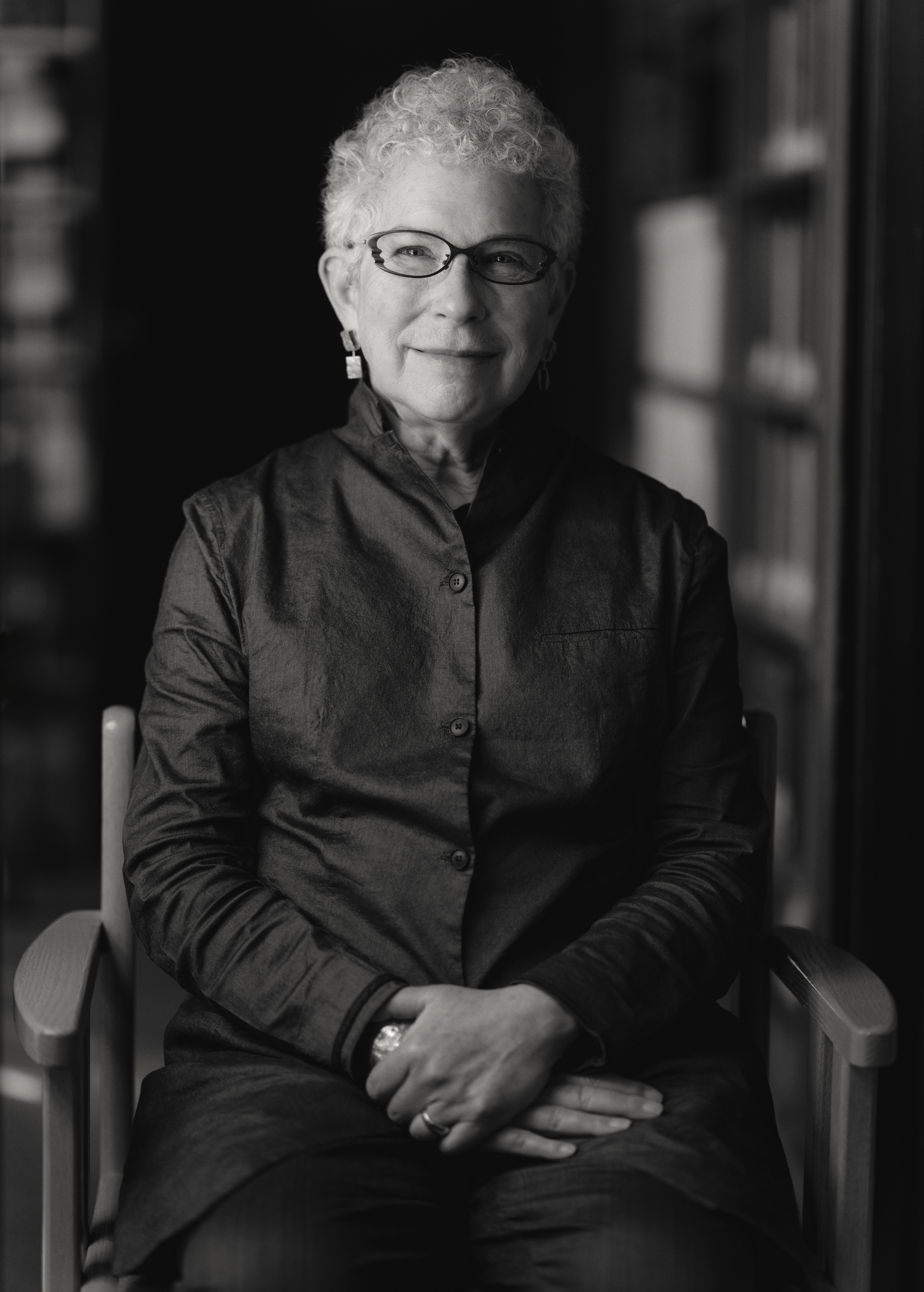
- Levi in 2022
- Born: 1947 (age 78–79)
- Awards: Johan Skytte Prize in Political Science

Academic background
- Education: Bryn Mawr College (BA); Harvard University (MA, PhD)
- Influences: Michael Lipsky; Douglass North; Edward C. Banfield

Margaret Levi (born 1947) is an American political scientist and author, known for her work in comparative political economy, labor politics, and democratic theory, notably on the origins and effects of trustworthy government.

== Education ==
Margaret Levi earned her BA from Bryn Mawr College in 1968, in political science. At Bryn Mawr, she was influenced by Alice Frey Emerson, Paul Brass and Peter Bachrach to pursue political science. In 1967, she took a class at Swarthmore College alongside fellow students Peter Katzenstein and David Laitin, who would both go on to become prominent political scientists.

She began her PhD studies on urban and regional planning at the Harvard Graduate School of Design. However, she abandoned her studies before returning to Harvard University to do a PhD in political science. During her political science PhD studies, she was influenced by Michael Lipsky, Robert Fogelson and Edward Banfield.

She joined the faculty of the University of Washington after earning her PhD from Harvard University in 1974. In her early work, she focused on urban politics. At the UW, she co-taught classes with Douglass North for several years.

== Career ==
From 2014 to 2022, Levi was the Sara Miller McCune Director of the Center for Advanced Study in the Behavioral Sciences (CASBS) at Stanford University. After stepping down from director of CASBS, Levi has continued at Stanford as a professor of political science, a Faculty Fellow at CASBS, a Senior Fellow at the Center for Democracy, Development and Rule of Law (CDDRL) of the Freeman Spogli Institute, as well as a Senior Fellow, Woods Institute for the Environment; and co-director of the Stanford Ethics, Technology, and Society Initiative. She is also the Jere L. Bacharach Professor Emerita of International Studies in the Department of Political Science of the University of Washington.

Levi was a Senior Fellow at the Watson Institute for International Studies, Brown University for 2013–14. She held the chair in politics of United States Studies Centre at the University of Sydney from 2009 to 2013. At the University of Washington she was director of the CHAOS (Comparative Historical Analysis of Organizations and States) Center. She previously served as the Harry Bridges Chair and Director of the Harry Bridges Center for Labor Studies at the University of Washington.

Levi's book Of Rule and Revenue (1988), a study of the institutions of state revenue production, helped pioneer rational choice approaches in comparative politics. She has since "pushed rational choice analysis into new substantive areas", for example, in examining people's acceptance of military conscription in Consent, Dissent, and Patriotism (1997).

She is also the co-author of Analytic Narratives (Princeton University Press, 1998) Cooperation Without Trust? (Russell Sage, 2005), and Labor Standards in International Supply Chains (Edward Elgar, 2015). In the Interest of Others (Princeton, 2013), co-authored with John Ahlquist, explores how organizations provoke member willingness to act beyond material interest.

In other work, Levi investigates the conditions under which people come to believe their governments are legitimate and the consequences of those beliefs for compliance, consent, and the rule of law. Her research continues to focus on how to improve the quality of government. She is also committed to understanding and improving supply chains so that the goods we consume are produced in a manner that sustains both the workers and the environment.

Levi started The Brand Responsibility Project—a research project to document the campaign and dispute settlement between Nike, Inc. and the Central General de Trabajadores of Honduras (CGT). CGT claimed that Nike was responsible for providing terminal compensation, benefits and priority rehiring for 1,800 factory employees following the 2009 bankruptcy and closure of two Honduran factories (Hugger and VisionTex) that were part of Nike's supply chain.

"Margaret Levi's research program addresses fundamental issues concerning the bases for and effects of legitimacy, compliance, and consent in democratic regimes. Levi's scholarship has made pioneering contributions to understanding enduring questions about the conditions for and consequences of trust and distrust, compliance and resistance, and individual versus collective action."

While director of CASBS, much of Levi's scholarship focused on political economy, theories of change, and institutional design in what Levi and her collaborators describe as framework for a new "moral political economy."

Levi was general editor of the series Cambridge Studies in Comparative Politics. She is a member editor of the Proceedings of the National Academy of Sciences of the United States of America (PNAS) and co-editor of the Annual Review of Political Science. Levi has served on the boards of the: Social Science Research Council (SSRC); Institute for Advanced Study in Princeton; Center for Advanced Studies in the Social Sciences (CEACS) in Madrid; Scholar and Research Group of the World Justice Project, and the Berggruen Institute.

Her fellowships include the Woodrow Wilson in 1968, German Marshall in 1988–1989, and the Center for Advanced Study of the Behavioral Sciences in 1993–1994. She has been a visiting fellow at the Australian National University, Brown University, the European University Institute, the Max Planck Institute for the Study of Societies in Cologne, the Juan March institute, the Budapest Collegium, Cardiff University, the University of Oxford, Bergen University, and Peking University.

== Awards and honors ==
She became a fellow of the American Academy of Arts and Sciences in 2001, a John Simon Guggenheim Fellow in 2002, and a member of the National Academy of Sciences in 2015. She served as president of the American Political Science Association from 2004 to 2005. In 2014 she received the William H. Riker Prize in Political Science. She was elected as a Fellow of the American Academy of Political and Social Science as of 2017. She was elected to the American Philosophical Society in 2018 and the British Academy in 2022. She is the 2019 winner of the Johan Skytte Prize. In 2020 her ideas on "community of fate" won recognition as Falling Walls Breakthrough of the Year in Social Sciences and Humanities. She received an Honorary Doctorate from the Universidad Carlos III de Madrid in 2019.

== Personal life ==
Levi and her husband, attorney Robert Kaplan, collect Australian Aboriginal art, Ancestral Modern, an exhibition drawn from their collection, was on view at the Seattle Art Museum (SAM) in 2012. It afterward travelled to the Frist Center for the Arts in Nashville, the Chazen Museum of Art in Madison, the Blanton Museum of Art in Austin, and the Audain Art Museum in Whistler. A gift of their art to the Metropolitan Museum was exhibited by museum in 2017 in a special exhibition titled "On Country."

== Selected publications ==
- A Moral Political Economy: Present, Past, and Future. 2021. Cambridge University Press. (written with Federica Caraguti)
- In the Interest of Others: Organizations and Social Activism. 2013. Princeton University Press. (written with John Ahlquist).
- "Why We Need a New Theory of Government." 2006. Perspectives on Politics 4(1): 5–19.
- Cooperation without Trust? 2005. Russell Sage Foundation. (written with Karen Cook and Russell Hardin).
- "Organizing Power: Prospects for the American Labor Movement." 2003. Perspectives on Politics 1(1): 45–68.
- "The Economic Turn in Comparative Politics." 2000. Comparative Political Studies 33(6/7): 822–844.
- "Political Trust and Trustworthiness." 2000. Annual Review of Political Science 3:475–507. (written with Laura Stoker).
- Competition and Cooperation: Conversations with Nobelists about Economics and Political Science. 1999. Russell Sage Foundation. (edited with James Alt and Elinor Ostrom).
- Analytic Narratives. 1998. Princeton University Press. (written with Robert Bates, Avner Greif, Jean-Laurent Rosenthal, and Barry Weingast).
- Trust and Governance. 1998. Russell Sage Foundation. (edited with Valerie Braithwaite).
- "Social and Unsocial Capital: A Review Essay of Robert Putnam's Making Democracy Work." Politics & Society 24(1): 45–55.
- Consent, Dissent, and Patriotism. 1997. Cambridge University Press.
- Marxism. 1991. Edward Elgar. (editor).
- The Limits of Rationality. 1990. University of Chicago Press. (edited with Karen Cook).
- Of Rule and Revenue. 1988. University of California Press.
- Bureaucratic Insurgency: The Case of Police Unions. 1977. Lexington Books.

== Archives ==
- John Ahlquist and Margaret Levi research materials for the book In the Interest of Others : Organizations and Social Activism, 2006-2012, University of Washington Libraries, Special Collections
