= Politics and Vision =

Book by Sheldon Wolin

- First edition
- Author: Sheldon S. Wolin
- Language: English
- Genre: Non-fiction
- Publisher: Little, Brown
- Publication date: 1960

Politics and Vision: Continuity and Innovation in Western Political Thought is a work of political theory by Princeton Emeritus Professor Sheldon S. Wolin. Part One, consisting of ten chapters and first published in 1960, distinguishes political philosophy from philosophy in general and traces political philosophy from its Platonic origins to modern day. Part Two, consisting of seven chapters and published (along with Part One) in a 2004 expanded edition, traces the development of political thought from Marx, Nietzsche, and others up to the late 20th century. Wolin left Part One unaltered in the expanded edition, confining the expressions of his changes in thought about political theory to those sections of Part Two that overlap with Part One.

One sign of the significance of the work is the large number of graduate students and professors who for three decades used it as a primary source of guidance in the field of political theory. In revising the work, Wolin cites three major changes in political theory and politics between 1960 and 2004: (1) the aftermath of Fascism's fall in Europe and Communism's fall generally, with an intervening constant "semi-mobilization" by liberal democracies, (2) an increase in the rights of citizens against the tendencies of regimentation by the state (e.g. anti-discrimination laws), and (3) an increase in the ability of nations to "control, punish, survey, direct, and influence citizens." Wolin states that the first change necessitated the latter two changes, leading to an "inverted totalitarianism" where increased rights exist alongside a less participatory citizenry under more pervasive governmental control.

Wolin states that an inquiry is a process, a tool to find truths. Philosophy is distinguished from other forms of inquiry in that "philosophy claims to deal with truths publicly arrived at and publicly demonstrable." Contrasted with this are revealed truths dealing with sacred rites, religion, and private findings of conscience or feelings. Political philosophy hews close to this characteristic of philosophy as a whole, with the public ("demos") at times in history demanding that laws be publicly demonstrated and accessible, even if their origin was supposedly revealed truth. For Wolin, it is the nature of politics that common concerns are brought before the political process, because the political is best equipped both to confront those concerns and to do so in a public, demonstrable, and thus philosophical manner.

The discernment of what within philosophy exactly is political and what is not is confused by two factors: (1) the line can be blurred due to the interaction of political factors with other influences and (2) the language used to describe political ideas is often used in other contexts, and vocabulary from other areas is often applied to the political.
