= Johan Skytte Prize in Political Science =

- (Swedish: Skytteanska priset i statskunskap)
- Awarded for: Most remarkable achievements within the field of Political Science
- Date: 1994; 32 years ago
- Location: Uppsala, Sweden
- Presented by: Johan Skytte Foundation at Uppsala University
- Reward: 500,000 SEK
- First award: 1995
- Website: skytteprize.com

The Johan Skytte Prize in Political Science (Swedish: Skytteanska priset) was established in 1995 by the Johan Skytte Foundation at Uppsala University. The foundation itself goes back to the donation in 1622 from Johan Skytte (1577–1645), politician and chancellor of the university, which established the Skyttean professorship of Eloquence and Government.

The prize, 500,000 Swedish kronor (approximately $52,000) is to be given "to the scholar who in the view of the Foundation has made the most valuable contribution to political science". Since its creation in 1995, the Johan Skytte Prize has garnered a prestigious reputation within the social science community, earning the nickname "the Nobel Prize for Political Science." According to reputation surveys conducted in 2013–2014 and 2018, it is the most prestigious international academic award in political science.

== Recipients of the Johan Skytte Prize in Political Science ==
Year	Recipient	Country	Rationale	Affiliation
1995	Robert A. Dahl (1915–2014)	United States	"for his penetrating analysis of democratic theory, characterized by deep learning and breadth of mind, combined with epochal empirical studies of the actual functioning of representative government".	Yale University (Professor emeritus)
1996	Juan José Linz (1926–2013)	Germany; Spain; United States	"for his global investigation of the fragility of democracy in the face of the authoritarian threat, characterized by methodological versatility and historical and sociological breadth".	Yale University (Professor)
1997	Arend Lijphart (b. 1936)	Netherlands; United Kingdom; United States	"for his theoretically and empirically pathbreaking research on the function of consensus in democratic politics in divided as well as in homogeneous societies".	University of California, San Diego (Professor)
1998	Alexander L. George (1920–2006)	United States	"for his pathbreaking analysis of statecraft, its possibilities and limits, performed with great sensitivity for the importance of judgement, reasoned argumentation and responsible leadership in foreign policy decision-making".	Stanford University (Professor)
1999	Elinor Ostrom (1933–2012)	United States	"for her profound, empirical as well as theoretical, analysis of the nature of collective action and rational choice".	Indiana University Bloomington (Professor)
2000	Fritz W. Scharpf (b. 1935)	Germany	"for having analysed key concepts of political science with theoretical clarity and empirical thoroughness during an era of transnational change".	Max Planck Institute for the Study of Societies in Cologne (Professor)
2001	Brian Barry (1936–2009)	United Kingdom; United States	"for his profound contribution to normative political theory performed with passion as well as clarity in the grand tradition from the Enlightenment."	Columbia University (Professor); London School of Economics (Professor)
2002	Sidney Verba (1932–2019)	United States	"for his penetrating empirical analysis of political participation and its significance for the functioning of democracy."	Harvard University (Professor)
2003	Hanna Pitkin (1931–2023)	Germany; United States	"for her pathbreaking theoretical work, predominantly on the problem of representation."	University of California, Berkeley (Professor emerita)
2004	Jean Blondel (1929–2022)	France	"for his outstanding contribution to the professionalisation of European political science, both as a pioneering comparativist and an institution builder"	European University Institute, Florence (Professor)
2005	Robert Keohane (b. 1941)	United States	"for his significant contribution to our understanding of world politics in an era of interdependence, globalisation and terrorism."	Princeton University (Professor)
2006	Robert D. Putnam (b. 1941)	United States	"for his theory of the social capital."	Harvard University (Professor)
2007	Theda Skocpol (b. 1947)	United States	"for her visionary analysis of the significance of the state for revolutions, welfare and political trust, pursued with theoretical depth and empirical evidence."	Harvard University (Professor)
2008	Rein Taagepera (b. 1933)	Estonia; United States	"for his profound analysis of the function of electoral systems in representative democracy".	University of Tartu (Professor); University of California, Irvine (Professor emeritus)
2009	Philippe C. Schmitter (b. 1936)	United States	"for his path-breaking work on the role of corporatism in modern democracies, and for his stimulating and innovative analysis of democratization".	European University Institute, Florence (Professional fellow)
2010	Adam Przeworski (b. 1940)	Poland; United States	"raising the scientific standards regarding the analysis of the relations between democracy, capitalism and economic development."	New York University (Professor)
2011	Ronald Inglehart (1934–2021)	United States	"for contributing innovative ideas about the relevance and roots of political culture in a global context, transcending previous mainstream approaches of research."	University of Michigan (Professor)
2011	Pippa Norris (b. 1953)	United Kingdom; United States	"for contributing innovative ideas about the relevance and roots of political culture in a global context, transcending previous mainstream approaches of research."	Harvard University (Professor)
2012	Carole Pateman (b. 1940)	United Kingdom; United States	"for in a thought-provoking way challenging established ideas about participation, sex and equality."	University of California, Los Angeles (Professor emeritus)
2013	Robert Axelrod (b. 1943)	United States	"for profoundly having changed our presumptions about the preconditions for human cooperation.”	University of Michigan (Professor)
2014	David Collier (b. 1942)	United States	"for his contribution to the conceptual development and the re-thinking of qualitative methods in Political Science."	University of California, Berkeley (Professor)
2015	Francis Fukuyama (b. 1952)	United States	“for breath-taking learnedness, clarity and courage thrown new light over the growth of modern political order.”	Stanford University Freeman Spogli Institute for International Studies (Olivier Nomellini Senior Fellow)
2016	Jon Elster (b. 1940)	Norway	“for incisive, penetrating, and unceasing drive to examine and reexamine that which explains human behavior.”	Columbia University (Robert K. Merton Professor in Social Sciences)
2017	Amartya Sen (b. 1933)	India	for his multifaceted achievement that “combines insights into human vulnerability with knowledge about the potential of democratic political power to redress and relieve this deprivation.”	Harvard University (Thomas W. Lamont University Professor)
2018	Jane Mansbridge (b. 1939)	United States	for “having shaped our understanding of democracy in its direct and representative forms, with incisiveness, deep commitment and feminist theory.”	Harvard University (Charles F. Adams Professor of Political Leadership and Democratic Values)
2019	Margaret Levi (b. 1947)	United States	for "having laid the foundations of our understanding of why citizens accept state coercion, by combining theoretical acumen and historical knowledge."	Stanford University Center for Advanced Study in the Behavioral Sciences (Director and Professor of Political Science)
2020	Peter J. Katzenstein (b. 1945)	Germany; United States	for “furthering the understanding of how history, culture, and norms shape economies, as well as national and global security policy.”	Cornell University (Walter S. Carpenter, Jr. Professor of International Studies)
2021	David D. Laitin (b. 1945)	United States	for his “original and objective explanation of how politics shapes cultural strategies in heterogeneous societies."	Stanford University (James T. Watkins IV and Elise V. Watkins Professor in the School of Humanities and Sciences)
2022	Robert E. Goodin (b. 1950)	Australia; United States	for his impressive work in which he “with acuity and success endeavored to blend political philosophy with empirical political science to increase the understanding of how decent and dignified societies can be shaped.”	Australian National University (Professor emeritus)
2023	Martha Finnemore (b. 1959)	United States	"for having formulated and empirically demonstrated the fruitfulness of constructivism, thus renewing and deepening the understanding of international politics."	George Washington University (University Professor of Political Science and International Affairs)
2023	Alexander Wendt (b. 1958)	United States	"for having formulated and empirically demonstrated the fruitfulness of constructivism, thus renewing and deepening the understanding of international politics."	Ohio State University (Mershon Professor of International Security and Professor of Political Science)
2024	Jürgen Habermas (1929–2026)	Germany	"for having constantly reminded us, theoretically and empirically, that the very lifeblood of democracy depends on human capacity and willingness to respect others by means of communicative action and on that basis to engage in critical argumentation and discourse.”	University of Frankfurt am Main (Professor emeritus)
2025	Herbert Kitschelt (b. 1955)	Germany; United States	for “having increased knowledge of the functioning of democratic party systems with exquisite theoretical acuity and impressive empirical breadth and depth.”	Duke University (George V. Allen Distinguished Professor of International Relations)
2026	Seyla Benhabib (b. 1950)	Turkey; United States	for “examining how justice is possible in a world of constant human mobility, with deep respect for the rights of both individuals and states.”	Yale University (Eugene Meyer Professor Emeritus of Political Science and Philosophy)
