= Lisa Wedeen =

American political scientist

- Education: University of California, Berkeley
- Occupation: Professor of Political Science
- Writing career
- Genre: non-fiction

Lisa Wedeen is Professor of Political Science and the College and Co-Director of the Chicago Center for Contemporary Theory at the University of Chicago. In 1995, Wedeen received her Ph.D. in political science at the University of California, Berkeley. Her former advisor was Hanna Pitkin. She has taught courses on nationalism, identity formation, power and resistance, and citizenship. Her work on the Middle East includes Ambiguities of Domination, an ethnographic study of the culture of the spectacle in Syria under Hafez al-Assad. In 2019, she published the book Authoritarian Apprehensions, in which she tested the applicability of her earlier conclusions to the regime of Hafez al-Assad's son and successor, Bashar al-Assad.

== Selected publications ==
- "Acting 'As If': Symbolic Politics and Social Control in Syria" (1998)
- Ambiguities of Domination: Politics, Rhetoric, and Symbols in Contemporary Syria (University of Chicago Press, 1999)
- Authoritarian Apprehensions: Ideology, Judgment, and Mourning in Syria (2019)
- "Concepts and Commitments in the Study of Democracy" in Problems and Methods in the Study of Politics (2004)
- "Conceptualizing 'Culture': Possibilities For Political Science" In APSR (2002)
- "Ethnography as an Interpretive Enterprise" (2009)
- "Ideology and Humor in Dark Times: Notes from Syria" (2013)
- Peripheral Visions: Politics, Power, and Performance in Yemen (University of Chicago Press, 2008)
- "Reflections on Ethnographic Work in Political Science" (2010)
- "Seeing Like a Citizen, Acting Like a State: Exemplary Events in Unified Yemen" in Comparative Studies in Society and History (2003)
