= Jean Blondel =

French political scientist (1929–2022)

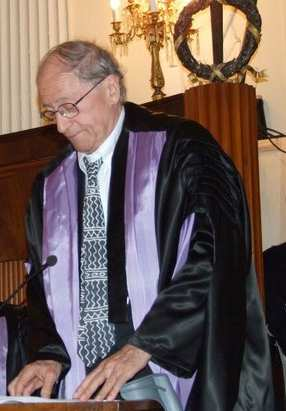
- Blondel in 2008
- Born: Jean Fernand Pierre Blondel; 26 October 1929; Toulon, France
- Died: 25 December 2022 (aged 93); London, England
- Awards: Johan Skytte Prize (2004)

Academic background
- Education: Sciences Po (BA); St Antony's College, Oxford (BLitt); Manchester University (PhD)

Academic work
- Discipline: Political science
- Sub-discipline: Comparative politics
- Institutions: European University Institute; University of Essex
- Main interests: Political parties, party systems

Jean Fernand Pierre Blondel (26 October 1929 – 25 December 2022) was a French political scientist specialising in comparative politics. He was Emeritus Professor at the European University Institute in Florence, and visiting professor at the University of Siena.

== Life and career ==
Jean Fernand Pierre Blondel was born in Toulon, France on 26 October 1929. He graduated the Institut d'Études Politiques of Paris in 1953 and then attended St Antony's College, Oxford from 1953 to 1955. After graduating with a B.Litt, he had returned to France for his military service and only then could conclude his studies on central and local government at Manchester University.

He became a lecturer at the University College of North Staffordshire (now Keele University) from 1958 to 1963, a fellow at Yale University in 1963-4 and then moved to the University of Essex in 1964, where he founded the Department of Government. In 1969, he helped found the European Consortium for Political Research and directed it for ten years following its foundation meeting in 1970. He left Essex in 1984 and was appointed scholar of the Russell Sage Foundation in New York in 1984. In 1985, he became professor of political science at the European University Institute in Florence, a position he held until his retirement in 1994.

Blondel died from a lower respiratory tract infection in London, on 25 December 2022, at the age of 93.

=== Academic work ===
Blondel is particularly noted for the contributions he made to the theory of party systems, the comparative study of cabinets, and the relations between parties and governments. Latterly, he worked on the comparative approach to analysing presidentialism across the globe, with emphasis on the regions of Latin America, Africa and the former Soviet republics.

== Honours ==
Blondel was a member of the Royal Swedish Academy of Sciences, the American Academy of Arts and Sciences and the Academia Europaea. In 2004, he was awarded the Johan Skytte Prize in Political Science "for his outstanding contribution to the professionalisation of European political science, both as a pioneering comparativist and an institution builder".

In recognition of his work, the ECPR has since October 2003 awarded the annual Jean Blondel PhD Prize for the best thesis in politics nominated by a member institution in a given year.

He also held honorary doctorates from the Universities of Salford and Essex in the United Kingdom, Louvain-la-Neuve in Belgium, Turku in Finland, and Siena in Italy.

== Selected publications ==
- Voters, parties and leaders : the social fabric of British politics. Harmondsworth : Penguin Books, 1963.
- An Introduction to Comparative Government. London: Weidenfeld & Nicolson, 1969.
- Comparative legislatures. Englewood Cliffs, N.J : Prentice-Hall, 1973.
- Political parties. A genuine case for discontent?. London : Wildwood House, 1978.
- The Discipline Of Politics. London & Boston : Butterworths, 1981.
- Political leadership : towards a general analysis. London & Beverly Hills : SAGE, 1987.
- Blondel, Jean and Ferdinand Müller-Rommel (eds.) Cabinets in Western Europe . Basingstoke : Macmillan, 1988.
- Blondel, Jean and Ferdinand Müller-Rommel (eds.) Governing together : the extent and limits of joint decision-making in Western European cabinets. New York : St. Martin's Press, 1993.
- Blondel, Jean and Maurizio Cotta (eds.) Party and government : an inquiry into the relationship between governments and supporting parties in liberal democracies. New York : St. Martin's Press, 1996.
- Blondel, Jean, Richard Sinnott, and Palle Svensson People and Parliament in the European Union : participation, democracy, and legitimacy. Oxford, England : Clarendon Press, 1998.
- Blondel, Jean and Maurizio Cotta (eds.) The nature of party government : a comparative European perspective. New York : St. Martin's Press, 2000.
- Blondel, Jean and Ferdinand Müller-Rommel (eds.) Cabinets in Eastern Europe . Basingstoke : Macmillan, 2001.
- Blondel, Jean. The Presidential Republic. Palgrave Macmillan, 2015.
