= Sheldon Wolin =

American political theorist (1922–2015)

- Born: Sheldon Sanford Wolin; August 4, 1922; Chicago, Illinois, U.S.
- Died: October 21, 2015 (aged 93); Salem, Oregon, U.S.
- Spouse: Emily Purvis

Education
- Education: Oberlin College, Harvard University

Philosophical work
- Era: Contemporary philosophy
- Region: Western philosophy
- School: Continental philosophy
- Institutions: Princeton University
- Doctoral students: Cornel West
- Main interests: Democracy, political philosophy
- Notable ideas: Inverted totalitarianism

Sheldon Sanford Wolin (/ˈwoʊlɪn/; August 4, 1922 – October 21, 2015) was an American political theorist and writer on contemporary politics. A political theorist for fifty years, Wolin became Professor of Politics, Emeritus, at Princeton University, where he taught from 1973 to 1987.

During a teaching career which spanned more than forty years, Wolin also taught at the University of California, Berkeley, University of California, Santa Cruz, Oberlin College, Oxford University, Cornell University, and University of California, Los Angeles. He was a notable teacher of undergraduate and particularly graduate students, serving as a mentor to many students who themselves became prominent scholars and teachers of political theory.

== Academic career ==
After graduating from Oberlin College, Wolin received his doctorate from Harvard University in 1950, for a dissertation entitled Conservatism and Constitutionalism: A Study in English Constitutional Ideas, 1760–1785. After teaching briefly at Oberlin, Wolin taught political theory at the University of California, Berkeley, from 1954 to 1970, and built a political theory program by bringing Norman Jacobson, John H. Schaar, Hanna Fenichel Pitkin, and Michael Rogin into the department.

One of Wolin's central concerns was how the history of political thought could contribute to understanding contemporary political dilemmas and predicaments. He played a significant role in the Free Speech Movement and with John Schaar interpreted that movement to the rest of the world. During the seventies and eighties he published frequently for the New York Review of Books. He also wrote opinion pieces and reviews for the New York Times. In 1980, he was the founding editor of the short-lived but intellectually influential journal democracy (1980–83) funded by Max Palevsky. At Princeton, Wolin led a successful faculty effort to pass a resolution urging university trustees to divest from endowment investment in firms that supported South African apartheid.

Wolin left Berkeley in the fall of 1970 for the University of California, Santa Cruz, where he taught until the spring of 1972. From 1973 through 1987, he was a professor of politics at Princeton University. Wolin served on the editorial boards of many scholarly journals, including Political Theory, the leading journal of the field in the Anglo-American world. He consulted for various scholarly presses, foundations and public entities, including Peace Corps, American Council of Learned Societies, and the Social Science Research Council. Wolin also served as president of the Society for Legal and Political Philosophy.

== Political theorist ==
=== Approach to political theory ===
Wolin was instrumental in founding what came to be known as the Berkeley School of political theory.

In his work Politics and Vision, Wolin formulates an interpretative approach to the history of political thought, based on careful study of different theoretical traditions. He pays particular attention to how the latter contribute to the changing meanings of a received political vocabulary, including notions of authority, obligation, power, justice, citizenship, and the state. Wolin's approach also had a bearing on contemporary problems and questions and he notoriously defined the inquiry into the history of political thought and the study of different traditions and forms of theorizing that have shaped it "as a form of political education."

Wolin's approach to the study of political theory consisted of a historical-minded inquiry into the history of political thought to inform the practice of political theory in the present. A consummate reader of texts, he carefully combined attention to both the intellectual and political contexts in which an author intervened and the genres of writing he deployed, with an eye to understanding how a particular body of work shed light on a specific political predicament. But this was no antiquarian exercise. It rather consisted of an attempt to "understand some aspect of the historical past [that] is also conscious of the historical character and locus of [the inquirer's] own understanding. Historicity has to do with the convergence of the two, and the inquirer’s contribution of his present is crucial."

Similarly, his essay "Political Theory as a Vocation", written in the context of the Cold War, the Vietnam War and the Civil Rights Movement, mounted a seething critique of Behaviorism and how it impaired the ability to grasp the crises of the time. Thirty years later, he explicitly formulated the importance of political theory and the study of political thought as “primarily a civic and secondarily an academic activity.” Wolin's 2001 study of Alexis de Tocqueville, Tocqueville Between Two Worlds, constitutes his second summum opus. Cornel West has called it Wolin's masterpiece, the crowning achievement of “the greatest political theorist of and for democracy of our time.”

=== Works on modern thinkers ===
In essays dealing with major thinkers of the recent past, including some of the most formidable bodies of work of the twentieth century, Wolin probed different approaches to both understanding the nature of theory and its bearing on the political from a perspective clearly aligned with the principles of participatory democracy. From this perspective, Wolin engaged with a vast array of thinkers: Theodor W. Adorno & Max Horkheimer, Hannah Arendt, John Dewey, Michel Foucault, Leo Strauss, Harvey C. Mansfield, Karl Marx, Friedrich Nietzsche, Michael Oakeshott, Karl Popper, John Rawls, Richard Rorty, and Max Weber. Politically, Wolin penned essays on a variety of themes and figures, including terrorism, conservatism, Jimmy Carter, Henry Kissinger, and Ronald Reagan. His The Presence of the Past offered an original critique of Reaganism, its discourse and practice, and a series of searching reflections on the bicentennial of the American Constitution. His last book, Democracy Incorporated (2008) formulates a scathing critique of the administration of George W. Bush and its war on terror and a plea for the recovery of democratic values and practices.

=== Fate of democracy ===
In these interventions, Wolin formulated an original non-Marxist critique of capitalism and the fate of democratic political life in the present. In his effort to think about the fate of democracy in the United States, he formulated a novel theorization of modern and postmodern forms of power and how these shaped the limits and horizons of political life in the late twentieth and early twentieth-first centuries. While influenced by Marx's critique of capitalism as a form of power, Wolin's political thought is decidedly non-Marxist in his insistence on participatory democracy, the primacy of the political, and the conviction that a radical theory of democracy requires mapping the forms of power beyond the economy. Wolin's political thought is particularly concerned with the fate of democracy at the hands of bureaucratic imperatives, elitism, and managerial principles and practices. His ideas of "inverted totalitarianism" and "fugitive democracy" constitute well-known signatures of his reflections. Another signature contribution is his account of the liberal-democratic state, which Wendy Brown has characterized as a "neo-Weberian" account of the state, "heavy with rationalities and bureaucratic domination; it is a Marxist-structuralist state, neither identical with nor a simple instrument of capitalism but complexly entwined with it. It is an administrative and penetrative state - those tentacles are everywhere and on everyone, especially the most disempowered; they do not honor public/private distinctions, political/economic distinctions, or even legal/extra-legal distinctions...the contemporary state is a complex amalgam of political, economic, administrative and discursive powers."

Out of this diagnosis of the state and its complex relationship to capitalism, Wolin forged the idea of "fugitive democracy." In his view, democracy is not a fixed state form, but a political experience in which ordinary people are active political actors. In this construction "fugitive" stands for the ways in which contemporary forms of power have made this aspiration an evanescent and momentary political experience.

== Personal life ==
Wolin was born in Chicago and raised in Buffalo, New York. At the age of nineteen, Wolin interrupted his studies at Oberlin College to become a US Army Air Forces bombardier/navigator, serving on the Consolidated B-24 Liberator. Wolin flew 51 different combat missions serving in the South Pacific, specifically the islands surrounding the Philippines, during World War II. Wolin's team were tasked with Douglas MacArthur's strategy of conducting raids against the Japanese Navy, which required flying low over Japanese destroyers in order to bomb them. This tactic was incredibly risky, as the B-24 was a "big, lumbering aircraft" which was hard to manoeuvre, and not infrequently "proved disastrous" for the crews of these planes, costing the lives of many of Wolin's fellow airmen. Wolin mentioned that his flight mates were all very young at the time, being between nineteen and twenty-four years of age. Wolin mentioned that several of his flight mates, both at the time and years later, suffered psychological problems as a result of their activities in the War.

He was married to Emily Purvis Wolin for over sixty years.

== Awards ==
- Rockefeller Foundation Fellow
- American Council of Learned Societies Fellow
- Center for the Advance Study in the Behavioral Sciences Fellow, Stanford University
- Guggenheim Fellow
- Fulbright Fellow
- Clark Library Fellow, UCLA
- Member of the National Foundation for the Humanities
- Member of the American Academy of Arts and Sciences
- Christian Gauss Lectures
- David and Elaine Spitz Prize, Conference on Political Thought, for "Politics and Vision."
- 1985 American Political Science Association's Lippincott Award for the 1960 edition of "Politics and Vision: Continuity and Innovation in Western Political Thought"
- David Easton Award for "Tocqueville Between Two Worlds"
- 2008 Lannan Award for an "Especially Notable" Book for "Democracy Incorporated: Managed Democracy and the Specter of Inverted Totalitarianism"

== Works ==
=== Books ===
- Politics and Vision: Continuity and Innovation in Western Political Thought, expanded ed. (1960; Princeton University Press, 2004). ISBN 978-0-691-12627-2
- The Berkeley Student Revolt: Facts and Interpretations, edited with Seymour Martin Lipset (Garden City, NY: Anchor Books, 1965).
- The Berkeley Rebellion and Beyond: Essays on Politics & Education in the Technological Society, with John H. Schaar (Vintage Books/New York Review of Books, 1970).
- Hobbes and the Epic Tradition of Political Theory (William Andrews Clark Memorial Library, Los Angeles: University of California Press, 1970). (Spanish translation: Hobbes y la tradición épica de la teoría política, Colección Rétor, Madrid: Foro Interno, 2005. ISBN 978-84-933478-1-9)
- Presence of the Past: Essays on the State and the Constitution (1989; Johns Hopkins University Press)
- Tocqueville Between Two Worlds: The Making of a Political and Theoretical Life (Princeton University Press, 2001). ISBN 978-0-691-11454-5
- Democracy Incorporated: Managed Democracy and the Specter of Inverted Totalitarianism (Princeton University Press, 2008). ISBN 978-0-691-13566-3 (Spanish translation: Democracia S. A., Buenos Aires/Madrid, Katz editores S.A, 2008, ISBN 978-84-96859-46-3)
- Fugitive Democracy and Other Essays. Edited by Nicholas Xenos (Princeton University Press, 2016). ISBN 978-0691133645

=== Articles ===
- Sheldon Wolin (May 19, 2003). "Inverted Totalitarianism". The Nation. Archived from the original on October 4, 2011.
- Sheldon Wolin (July 18, 2003). "A Kind of Fascism Is Replacing Our Democracy". Newsday, archived at Axis of Logic.
- Sheldon Wolin (December 1969). "Political Theory as a Vocation". American Political Science Review, Vol. 63, No. 4, pp. 1062–82. (Spanish translation: "La teoría política como vocación". Foro Interno, vol. 11 (Diciembre 2011), pp. 193–234]).
