= Michael Rogin =

American political scientist (1937–2001)

Michael Paul Rogin
- Born: June 29, 1937; Mt. Kisco, New York
- Died: November 25, 2001 (aged 64)
- Occupation: Political scientist
- Spouse: Deborah Rogin

Michael Paul Rogin (June 29, 1937 – November 25, 2001) was an American political scientist who taught at the University of California, Berkeley. His intellectual interests included American literature and cinema. His work is notable for its critique of American imperialism, and he was viewed as one of the members of the Berkeley school of political theory. He was influential to many students, including cultural critic Greil Marcus.

== Education ==
- Harvard (undergraduate, summa cum laude)
- University of Chicago (master's)
- University of Chicago (doctoral)

== Personal life ==
Rogin was born in Mount Kisco, New York, to a non practicing Jewish family, and grew up with union and socialist activists. He was married to Deborah Rogin for many years, with whom he had two surviving daughters. Rogin was partners with colleague Ann Banfield at the time of his death.

== Published works ==
- The Intellectuals and McCarthy (1967)
- Fathers and Children: Andrew Jackson and the Subjugation of the American Indian (1975)
- Subversive Genealogy: the Politics and Art of Herman Melville (1983)
- 'Ronald Reagan,' the Movie, and Other Episodes in Political Demonology (1987)
- Blackface, White Noise: Jewish Immigrants in the Hollywood Melting Pot (1996)
- Independence Day, or How I Learned to Stop Worrying and Love the Enola Gay (1998)
