= Irish Rebellion =

Irish Rebellion may refer to:

- The Irish Bruce Wars 1315–1318, an attempt by members of the O'Neill clan backed by a Scottish and Irish army to make Edward Bruce the High King of Ireland. They were supported by Edward's older brother, Robert the Bruce, King of Scotland.
- The Geraldine Rebellion (1534) and the FitzGerald Rebellion against Henry VIII of England 1535 to 1537, having to do with who was supreme head of the church
- The Desmond Rebellions, which occurred in the 1560s, 1570s and 1580s in Munster
- Tyrone's Rebellion (also known as the Nine Years' War (Ireland) from 1594 to 1603, predominantly in Ulster
- O'Doherty's Rebellion, 1607
- The Irish Rebellion of 1641, a conflict between the Roman Catholic native Gaelic-Irish and Hiberno-Normans, and Protestant settlers
- The Irish Rebellion of 1798, a republican uprising against British rule of Ireland
- The United Irish Uprising of 1800, an uprising against British rule of Newfoundland
- The 1803 Irish rebellion, for independence, led by Robert Emmet
- The Young Irelander Rebellion of 1848, also called The Famine Rebellion of 1848
- The Fenian Rising of 1867
- The Easter Rising of 1916, a nationalist uprising against British rule of Ireland

== See also ==
- List of Irish uprisings
