= Constructivism (ethnic politics) =

Theory in ethnic politics

Constructivism presumes that ethnic identities are shapeable and affected by politics. Through this framework, constructivist theories reassesses conventional political science dogmas. Research indicates that institutionalized cleavages and a multiparty system discourage ethnic outbidding and identification with tribal, localized groups. In addition, constructivism questions the widespread belief that ethnicity inherently inhibits national, macro-scale identification. To prove this point, constructivist findings suggest that modernization, language consolidation, and border-drawing, weakened the tendency to identify with micro-scale identity categories. One manifestation of ethnic politics gone awry, ethnic violence, is itself not seen as necessarily ethnic, since it attains its ethnic meaning as a conflict progresses.

== Defining ethnic identity ==
In contrast to primordialism, constructivism observes that ethnic identities are not unchanging entities. Instead, political developments can shape which identities get activated.

=== Chandra on ethnic identity ===
Under one conceptualization of ethnic identity, descent-based attributes—e.g., skin color—are the defining marker of ethnic identities. Given the diversity of each individual's inherited attributes, everyone retains a "repertoire" of nominal identities that they can activate. To illustrate this concept, Kanchan Chandra offers the fictitious example of Helen, a Trinidadian American. Among Helen's nominal identities are the following categories: African American, West Indian, Black. In different contexts, Helen may emphasize different attributes, and by extension different identities, with which she identifies. To activate her membership in the West Indian or Black categories, she may decide to underscore attributes like her birth in Trinidad or her skin color, respectively.

Two factors—Chandra maintains—qualify the extent to which someone can change their repertoire of nominal identities: constrained change and visibility. The former factor acknowledges how many descent-based attributes, including skin color, are "sticky," i.e., restrictive of nominal identities and not easily changeable. Chandra states that Helen, for example, cannot plausibly claim to be German if none of her parents have German descent; nor can Helen activate any other identity extraneous to her repertoire. Moreover, "visibility" refers to the observability of descent-based attributes, since skin color, hair color, and the like are all noticeable and often carry an association with a particular ethnic identity. Both constrained change and visibility regulate the category repertoire.

With that being said, Chandra's framework does not foreclose the avenues of category change entirely. Explained by Chandra, it allows for five pathways:

1. "Change in the Repertoire of Basic Descent-Based Attributes" - This pathway alters which attributes are salient to category determination. In the U.S., as Chandra notes, skin color comprises a vital attribute that sways whom the public deems White, Black, etc. In a different country—presumably one with less stark differences in skin color—ear length may matter more. For post-colonial nations, a large determinant of which attributes receive emphasis, has been the census. During Spanish colonial rule in Bolivia, census administrators classified landless peasants as mestizos, even though they did so because hacienda owners wanted to shield their landless peasant workers from taxation. Nevertheless, land-owning status became a salient attribute vis-à-vis the mestizo category.
2. "Change in the 'Full' Repertoire of Nominal Ethnic Identity Categories" - Using the attributes they possess, individuals can construct new categories, though such change can only be long-term. To consolidate any changes, institutional frameworks, including the census, codify them. And newly constructed categories must remain logically consistent with their constitutive attributes.
3. "Change in the 'Operative' Repertoire of Nominal Identity Categories" - One's "operative repertoire" depends on the surrounding environment. If those around Helen, a Trinidadian American, have never heard of Trinidad, then Helen's activation options are effectively constrained to her African American and West Indian identities. Contextualization can therefore impact the nominal repertoire.
4. "Individuals 'Passing' or 'Switching' Within an Existing Population Repertoire of Attributes" - At times, a person who possesses attributes that closely resemble those of another group's, can "pass" as a member of that group. An outside observer may know little about the nuanced distinctions between the Sámi and Norwegians. Yet since both ethnic identity groups have light skin and other similar features, a Sámi can pass successfully as a Norwegian, and vice versa.
5. "Reclassification of Activated Ethnic Identity Categories Within an Existing Repertoire of Categories" - Someone of biracial heritage, for instance, may emphasize one identity at work and another at home, directing attention toward the appropriate attributes—be they surname or birthplace. For her part, Helen may activate her Trinidadian roots when situated with relatives or other Trinidadians, but activate her African American identity when situated with American-born friends or colleagues.

=== Fearon and Laitin on ethnic identity ===
Like Chandra, James Fearon and David Laitin acknowledge the necessity of descent as a basis for ethnic identity membership rules. They nonetheless differ in one noteworthy respect: Fearon and Laitin's approach places a premium on "cultural attributes," a concept which entails traditions, historical memories and legacies, religious and spiritual beliefs, etc. In regard to changing ethnic identities, there are—theoretically speaking—three ways to bring about identity construction, namely socioeconomic trends, discourse, and individual action either by elites or by laypeople.

=== Chandra on ethnic parties ===
Beyond an identity-level analysis, Chandra broadens her definitional theory to a central governing institution, the political party. There exists a difference between a multi-ethnic party and an ethnic one. The former denotes a party that excludes no ethnic groups, while the latter designates a party that performs some kind of exclusion. Chandra lists seven benchmarks for gauging whether a political party is ethnic or not: (1) "Classification based on name"; (2) "Classification based on explicit appeals," i.e., rhetoric that explicitly targets a specific ethnic group or groups; (3) "Classification based on explicit issue positions"; (4) "Classifications based on the implicit activation of ethnic identities," i.e., code words/phrases like dog whistles; (5) "Classification based on a group's votes," i.e., whenever a certain ethnic group mostly and/or overwhelmingly backs a particular political party, excluding other groups from that party's support base; (6) "Party votes," i.e., whenever a political party receives most of its vote share from a certain ethnic group or groups; (7) "Ethnic leadership," i.e., the composition of the party leadership; and (8) "Ethnic arena of contestation," i.e., whenever a political party competes only in certain ethnic enclaves or regions. Exclusion, then, constitutes the key marker of an ethnic party, for it must exclude some ethnic group or groups via the aforementioned mechanisms. Otherwise, ethnic and multi-ethnic parties would remain definitionally indistinguishable.

== Voting behavior ==
One article written by Jóhanna Kristín Birnir posits that because new democracies operate in low-information environments—per the creation of novel, undefined parties—ethnic cleavages become an especially important source of information for voters. Therefore, the more ethnically diverse a country is, the more stable its electoral results should be given the availability and visibility of ethnicity as a heuristic. Birnir surveys the activation of different ethnic identity cleavages in 59 countries, and examines Bulgaria as a case study, concluding that linguistic identity is the most crucial cleavage during the infancy of a new democracy. Birnir's study assesses the heterogeneity of democracies along linguistic and religious fractionalization, and measures "electoral volatility" via the difference in parties' vote share across electoral cycles. She finds that linguistic cleavages best anticipate said volatility. In many countries, Birnir asserts, linguistic barriers take precedence over racial ones, e.g., the Basques. The Bulgaria analysis, too, concludes that Turkish-speaking voters had stable voting behavior in the 1997 and 2001 elections. As for religion, it appears to be a cleavage that affects advanced, or "mature," party systems.

== Political institutions ==
=== Institutionalized cleavages ===
Chandra disputes the notion that the ethnicization of politics can lead to outbidding—i.e., ethnic polarization—which destabilizes democracy. Her critique examines how India's constitutional structure enshrines (1) affirmative action for select castes, (2) the categorization of languages, and (3) the drawing of Indian states—with a specific focus on the state of Uttar Pradesh. In Chandra's telling, the Bharatiya Janata Party (BJP) moved to activate Hindu nationalism during the late 1980s and early 1990s. Consequently, the Janata Dal Party used affirmative action to dangle patronage for "Other Backward Castes" and thereby targeted caste divisions within the Hindu community; this helped halt BJP outbidding. The design of the Indian Constitution, then, allowed political actors to activate different ethnic identities at different times. To remain viable, political parties must be able to attract diverse groups and compensate for losses incurred by the activation of a caste, religious, or some other identity; hence the moderation. Importantly, the Indian Constitution leaves the definition of its affirmative action, linguistic, and statehood provisions open to revision. Mitigating outbidding necessitates the institutionalization of cleavages with revisable definitions, so as to enable parties to leverage them for coalition-building.

=== Party structure ===
According to Daniel Posner, one-party elections highlight local, tribal identities, whereas multiparty contests bring larger identities—be they regional, religious, or linguistic—to the fore. When multiple parties vie for power, local political actors can associate themselves with a national party and thus "nationalize" a local election. A one-party regime, by contrast, removes the competitiveness of a national contest, and leaves local elections as the only outlet for de facto electoral competition. With the distractions of national political dynamics gone, local identities then assume greater salience. In Kenya and Zambia, the adoption of a multiparty system boded a shift in the types of identities that political actors accentuated. Posner argues that the adoption of a multiparty system underscored "language" cleavages in Zambia and "ethnoregional" ones in Kenya. He arrives at this conclusion by identifying every individual who was a parliamentary candidate before and after the adoption, and coded for those who belonged to the largest linguistic (Zambia) and ethnoregional (Kenya) groups within their respective electoral districts. A multiparty system did accurately forecast the success of candidates tied to the aforementioned groups.

=== Historical phenomena ===
==== Language consolidation ====
Posner provides a narrative as to how colonialism influenced the historical development and geography of Zambian languages. He notes that colonial missionary, education, and labor practices winnowed the number of Zambian languages to four main ones: Bemba, Lozi, Nyanja, and Tonga. The first practice—missionary work—encouraged linguistic consolidation in order to ease the translation of the Bible. As for the second practice, colonial education officials made Bemba, Lozi, Nyanja, and Tonga the "languages of instruction," in 1927. Meanwhile, the British South Africa Company (BSA), a mining corporation, orchestrated the migration of laborers toward company mines. BSA actions directly contributed to the prevalence of Bemba speakers in the area known as the "copperbelt." Furthermore, the company explicitly targeted them because their ancestral lands—in the northeast of Northern Rhodesia—were far removed from competing mines in Southern Rhodesia and South Africa. The Bemba, BSA officials reasoned, would be less susceptible to alternative job offers, which threatened BSA profits by tendering better pay.

==== Border-drawing ====
As Posner observes, border-drawing asymmetrically distributed the population shares of Chewas and Tumbukas, and generated the incentive structure of interethnic competition. Chewa-Tumbuka relations are starkly different in Malawi and Zambia. The relationship is hostile in the former, but cordial in the latter. To be clear, Chewas and Tumbukas in Malawi and Zambia share similarities by and large, especially because colonial authorities established the Malawi-Zambia border inattentively in terms of ethnic distribution. After confirming the stark attitudes through a field experiment, wherein he surveyed villagers who live near the border, Posner compares each group's share of the total population for both countries. With respect to Malawi, Chewas (28% share) and Tumbukas (12% share) were sizeable enough to comprise a political bloc in their own right. The Zambian results, however, showed something else: Chewas (7% share) and Tumbukas (4% share) were much smaller as individual groups. Zambia's unique demographic situation incentivized Chewas and Tumbukas to form a coalition together—given how each was too small to be viable politically—and construct an alliance as "Easterners."

==== Modernization ====
Through public opinion data compiled and collected by Afrobarometer, Amanda Lea Robinson investigates the relationship between modernization, ethnic diversity, and national identification, and she argues that modernization and ethnic diversity can induce the third outcome. To measure the first two factors, she uses 2005 GDP per capita and the Ethno-Linguistic Fractionalization (ELF) index, respectively. Modernization accurately predicts for increased national identification. In other words, the higher the GDP per capita for a given country, the higher the identification with a national identity. More specifically, urban residency fosters a 3% boost in national identification. Also, Robinson contends that diversity promotes political cohesion, not disunion. As suggested before by Posner, without the overwhelming majority of any single ethnic group, a heterogeneous body politic can have an incentive to de-emphasize identities that are inadequate as singular entities and instead ally with other groups, e.g., the Zambian Chewas and Tumbukas.

== Ethnic violence ==
As previously mentioned, Fearon and Laitin identify three possible channels by which ethnic conflicts arise via identity construction: (1) "Social and Economic Processes as Agents of Construction," i.e., macrohistorical forces like modernization; (2) "Social Construction by Discourse"; and (3) "Individuals as Agents of Construction," whether they be elites or non-elites. Fearon and Laitin's findings review several books—including Gérard Prunier's The Rwanda Crisis: History of a Genocide and Susan Woodward's Balkan Tragedy: Chaos and Dissolution After the Cold War—and glean the conclusion that the first and second channels inadequately or unclearly explain ethnic violence. "Individuals as Agents of Construction," though, presents a more promising explanation. The Rwandan Genocide, after all, originated from elite manipulation of identity construction, given that colonial and Rwandan leaders assigned the Hutu-Tutsi terminology ethnic significance. Prior to colonization, the terms indicated class rather than ethnicity. Fearon and Laitin see evidence for non-elite culpability as well, observing that some opportunistic non-elites hear elite cues and use them as excuses to plunder, execute personal vendettas, and/or indulge in violence.

Further developing the constructivist understanding of ethnic violence, Janet Lewis points out the "ethnicization" of conflict. Put simply, conflicts take on an ethnic significance over time, as opposed to being innately ethnic from their start. Her case study—post-1986 Uganda—illustrates how ethnicity was originally negligible in the creation of insurgencies against the central government, and a great many soon ceased to operate. Rather, the groups capable of "ethnic mobilization," were the ones that survived and eventually acquired the capacity to inflict violent acts. Lewis assesses such an affiliation by determining which insurgent organizations sprung up in ethnically homogenous areas. Equipped with the 1991 Ugandan census and the ELF index, she found that ethnic homogeneity tracked an insurgent group's durability, though ethnicity did not engender these insurgencies per se. Successful insurgent groups enjoyed, on average, an ELF score of .20, while those that ended up being unsuccessful produced an ELF score of .47. As a result, the intersection of ethnicity and conflict did not really come about until after the conflict had commenced.
