= John Schaar =

American political theorist

John Homer Schaar (July 7, 1928 – December 26, 2011, age 83), also known as Jack Schaar, was an American political theorist. He was a professor emeritus at the University of California, Santa Cruz. Schaar was born in Montoursville, Pennsylvania, and raised on a farm in a Lutheran family.

== Early life and education ==
Schaar received his Bachelor of Arts, Master of Arts, and Doctor of Philosophy degrees from the University of California, Los Angeles. He taught political theory at the University of California, Berkeley, where his theory colleagues included Sheldon Wolin, Norman Jacobson, Michael Rogin, and Hanna Pitkin. In 1970 he moved to UC Santa Cruz. At Berkeley, he was a significant influence on the Free Speech Movement of the 1960s.

His closest students included the late Wilson Carey McWilliams, Jeff Lustig, Douglas Lummis, Marge Frantz, J. Peter Euben, Frank Bardacke, Joshua Miller, and S. Paige Baty. He frequently taught at Deep Springs College. His central political values included community, democracy, and political participation. He published articles on patriotism, equality, and authority. He advocated the decentralization of political and economic power.

== Personal life ==
He was married to political theorist Hanna Pitkin, and together they resided in the Santa Cruz mountains.

== Publications ==
- Loyalty in America (Berkeley and Los Angeles: University of California Press, 1957).
- Escape from Authority: The Perspectives of Erich Fromm (New York: Basic Books, 1961).
- The Berkeley Rebellion and Beyond: Essays on Politics & Education in the Technological Society, co-authored with Sheldon S. Wolin (New York: New York Review Book, 1970).
- Legitimacy in the Modern State (collected essays) (New Brunswick, NJ: Transaction Press, 1981). See especially the title essay and "The Case for Patriotism."
