= Brownell =

Brownell is a surname. Notable people with the surname include:

- Abner C. Brownell (1813–1857), mayor of Cleveland, Ohio, United States
- Baker Brownell (1887–1965), American philosopher
- Bill Brownell, American professional basketball player
- Edwin Orion Brownell (born 1964), Canadian neo-classical composer and concert pianist
- Francis E. Brownell (1840–1894), Union Army soldier awarded the Medal of Honor for action during the American Civil War
- Francis H. Brownell (1867–1954), businessman, lawyer, and Washington state pioneer
- Frederick Brownell (1940–2019), former South African state herald, designer of the South African flag
- Herbert Brownell Jr. (1904–1996), United States Attorney General
- Jim Brownell (born 1948), Canadian politician
- Joseph H. Brownell (1854–1925), American lumberman, farmer, politician
- Kelly D. Brownell (born 1951), American obesity researcher
- Mary Brownell (1929–2017), Liberian peace activist
- Mia Brownell (born 1971), American visual artist
- Nelson Brownell, American politician
- Peter Brownell (born 1948), American politician
- Raymond Brownell (1894–1974), Royal Australian Air Force officer and World War I flying ace
- Sonia Brownell, maiden name of Sonia Orwell (1918–1980), wife of George Orwell
- Thomas Church Brownell (1779–1865), founder of Trinity College in Hartford, Connecticut, and Presiding Bishop of the Episcopal Church
- William Crary Brownell (1851–1928), American literary and art critic
- William E. Brownell, American scientist who conducts research at Baylor College of Medicine

== See also ==
- Brownell Car Company, street car manufacturer
- Brownell, Indiana, United States
- Brownell, Kansas, a city in Ness County, Kansas, United States
- Perez v. Brownell, US Supreme Court citizenship case
