= Carey McWilliams (journalist) =

American author and lawyer (1905–1980)

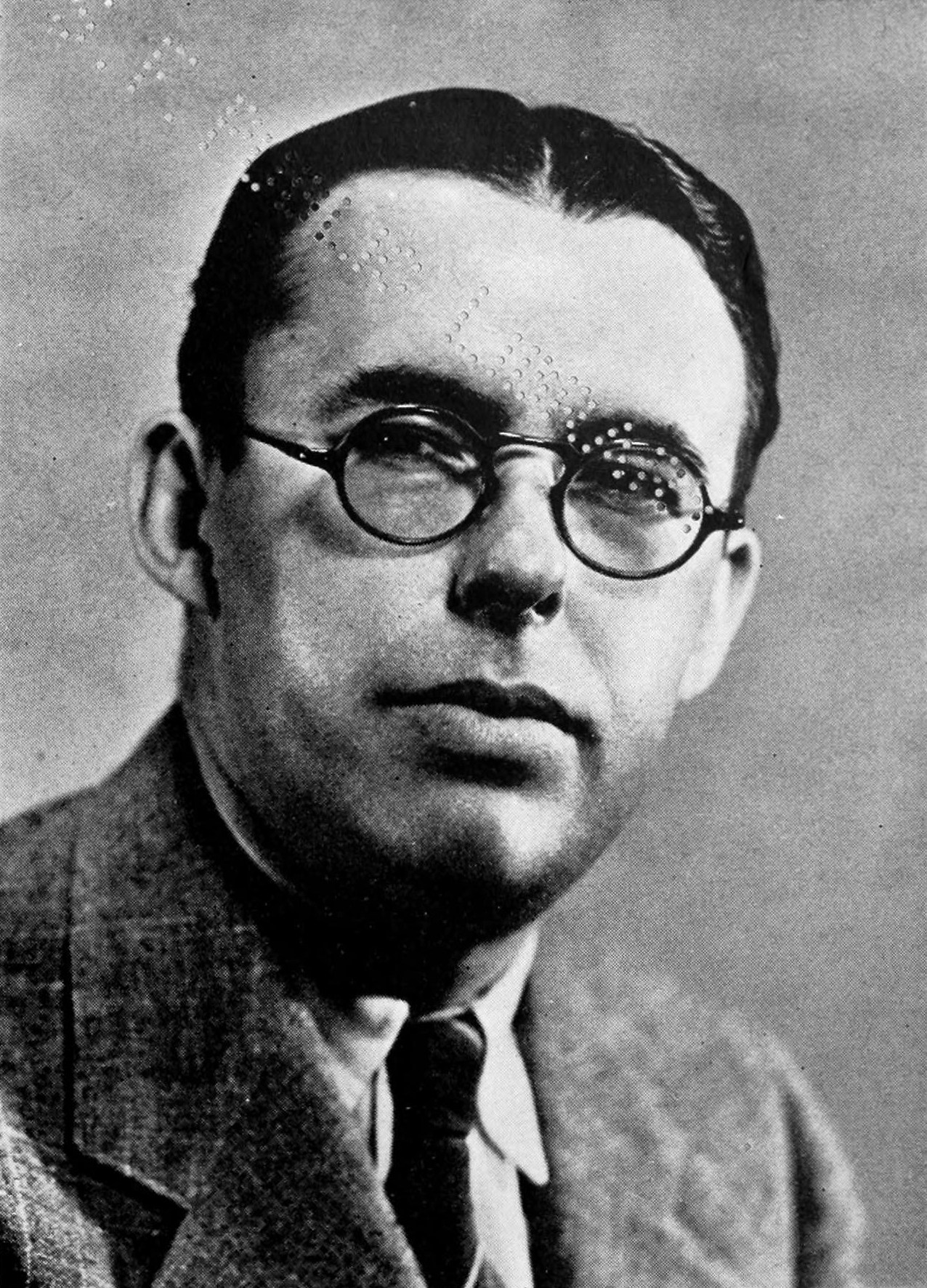
- McWilliams c. 1940

Chief of the California Division of Immigration and Housing
- In office January 19, 1939 – January 5, 1943
- Appointed by: Culbert Olson
- Preceded by: A. E. Monteith
- Succeeded by: Walter P. Koetitz

Personal details
- Born: December 13, 1905 Steamboat Springs, Colorado, U.S.
- Died: June 27, 1980 (aged 74) New York City, U.S.
- Spouse: Dorothy Hedrick (m. 1930)
- Children: Wilson; Jerry
- Relatives: Earle Raymond Hedrick (father-in-law); Susan McWilliams Barndt (granddaughter); Helen McWilliams (granddaughter)
- Education: University of Southern California School of Law
- Occupation: Investigative journalist, author, editor, lawyer

Carey McWilliams (December 13, 1905 – June 27, 1980) was an American author, editor, and lawyer. He is best known for his writings about California politics and culture, including the condition of migrant farm workers and the internment of Japanese Americans during World War II. From 1955 to 1975, he edited The Nation magazine.

== Early years ==
McWilliams was born December 13, 1905, in Steamboat Springs, Colorado. His father was a cattle rancher and also a State Senator. His father died three months before he graduated from Wolfe Hall Military Academy in 1921. He attended University of Denver but was asked to leave during his freshman year for "celebrating St. Patrick's Day too enthusiastically." He first came to California in 1922, a day or two later.

McWilliams attended the University of Southern California from which he obtained a law degree in 1927.

From 1927 to 1938, McWilliams practiced law in Los Angeles at Black, Hammock & Black. Some of his cases, including his defense of striking Mexican citrus workers, prefigured his later writing.

During the 1920s and early 1930s, McWilliams joined a loose network of mostly Southern California writers that included Robinson Jeffers, John Fante, Louis Adamic, and Upton Sinclair. His literary career also benefited greatly from his relationships with Mary Austin and H.L. Mencken. Mencken provided an outlet for McWilliams's early journalism and floated the idea for his first book, a 1929 biography of popular writer and sometime Californian Ambrose Bierce.

During the 1940s, McWilliams lived in Echo Park, California, a neighborhood of Los Angeles. He owned his home at 2041 Alvarado Street until the 1970s, well after he moved to New York in 1951.

== Political activity and publications ==
The Depression and the rise of European fascism in the 1930s radicalized McWilliams. He began working with left-wing political and legal organizations, including the American Civil Liberties Union and the National Lawyers Guild. He also wrote for Pacific Weekly, Controversy, The Nation, and other progressive magazines. He continued to represent workers in and around Los Angeles, helped organize unions and guilds, and served as a trial examiner for the new National Labor Relations Board.

His first bestseller, Factories in the Field, appeared in 1939 and ranks among his most enduring works. Published within months of John Steinbeck's The Grapes of Wrath, it examines the lives of migrant farm workers in California and condemns the politics and consequences of California agricultural land monopoly and large-scale agribusiness. Shortly before its publication, McWilliams accepted an offer from incoming governor Culbert Olson to head California's Division of Immigration and Housing. Over his four-year term (1938–1942), he focused on improving agricultural working conditions and wages, but his hopes for major reform deteriorated with the advent of World War II.

McWilliams's activism took many forms. In the early 1940s, he helped overturn the convictions of mostly-Latino youths following the so-called Sleepy Lagoon murder trial. He also helped cool the city's temperature during the Zoot Suit Riots of 1943, when scuffles between servicemen and Latino youths spun out of control. During the 1940 Democratic Party presidential primaries, McWilliams joined a left-swing slate pledged to lieutenant governor Ellis E. Patterson for president. They opposed incumbent Franklin D. Roosevelt on the grounds he was focusing too much on foreign affairs and not enough on domestic unemployment. Although McWilliams offered to resign for his involvement in the slate, his immediate superior George G. Kidwell convinced governor Olson to keep him. The Patterson slate ultimately lost to Roosevelt's by a margin of fifteen to one.

McWilliams left his government post in 1942, when incoming Governor Earl Warren promised campaign audiences that his first official act would be to fire him. McWilliams was a sharp critic of Warren, whom he described as "the personification of Smart Reaction," but he became an enthusiastic admirer after Warren joined the US Supreme Court the following decade. No such conversion occurred in his attitude toward another California politician, Richard Nixon, whom McWilliams described in 1950 as "a dapper little man with an astonishing capacity for petty malice."

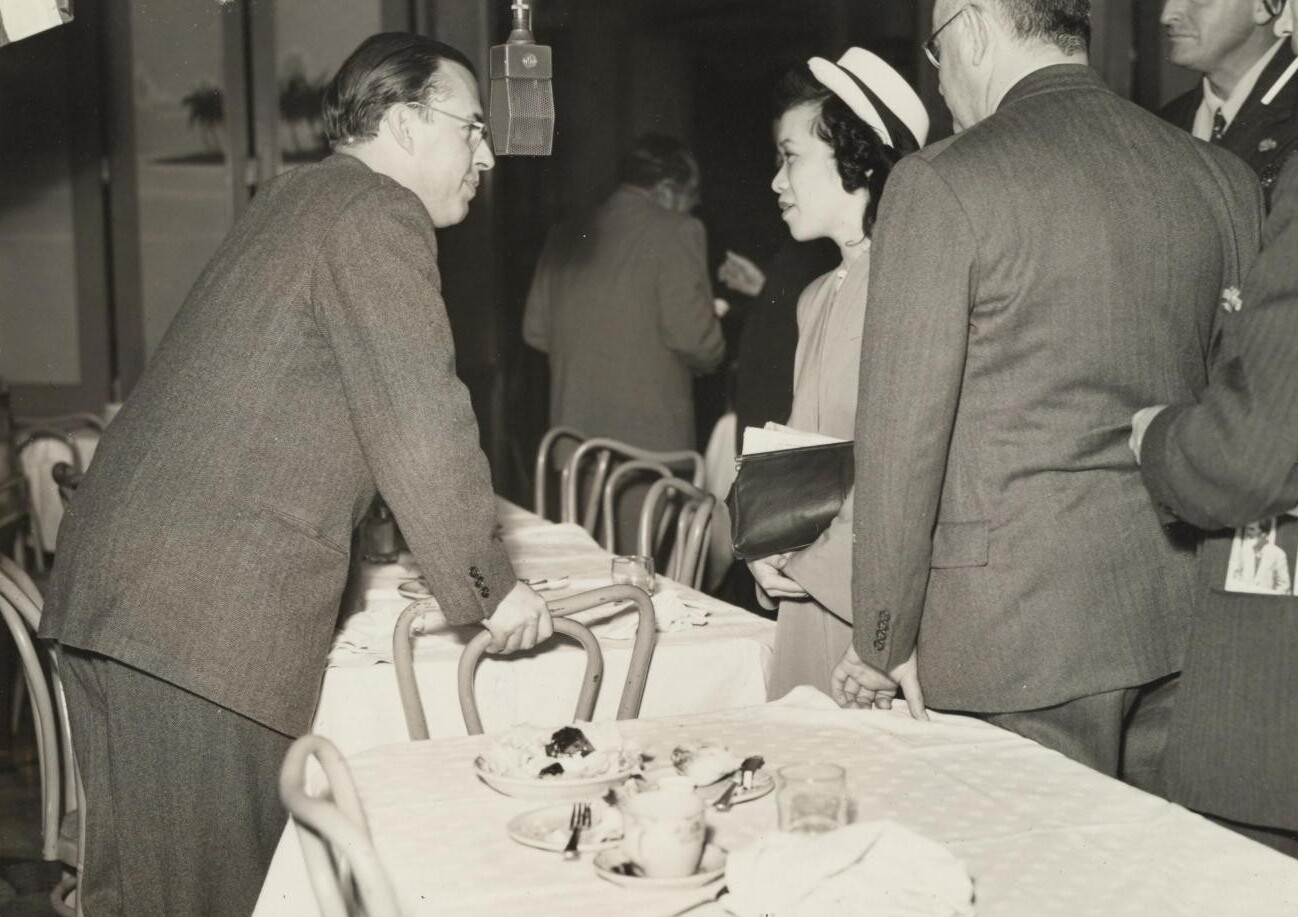
McWilliams speaks with former Manzanar internee Dorothy Takechi, 1945

Once out of government, McWilliams became an outspoken critic of the removal and internment of Japanese American citizens and almost immediately began writing an exposé on the topic. Published in 1944, Prejudice: Japanese-Americans: Symbol of Racial Intolerance was cited by Justice Frank Murphy in his dissenting opinion in Korematsu v. United States, the Supreme Court decision that upheld the constitutionality of the exclusion.

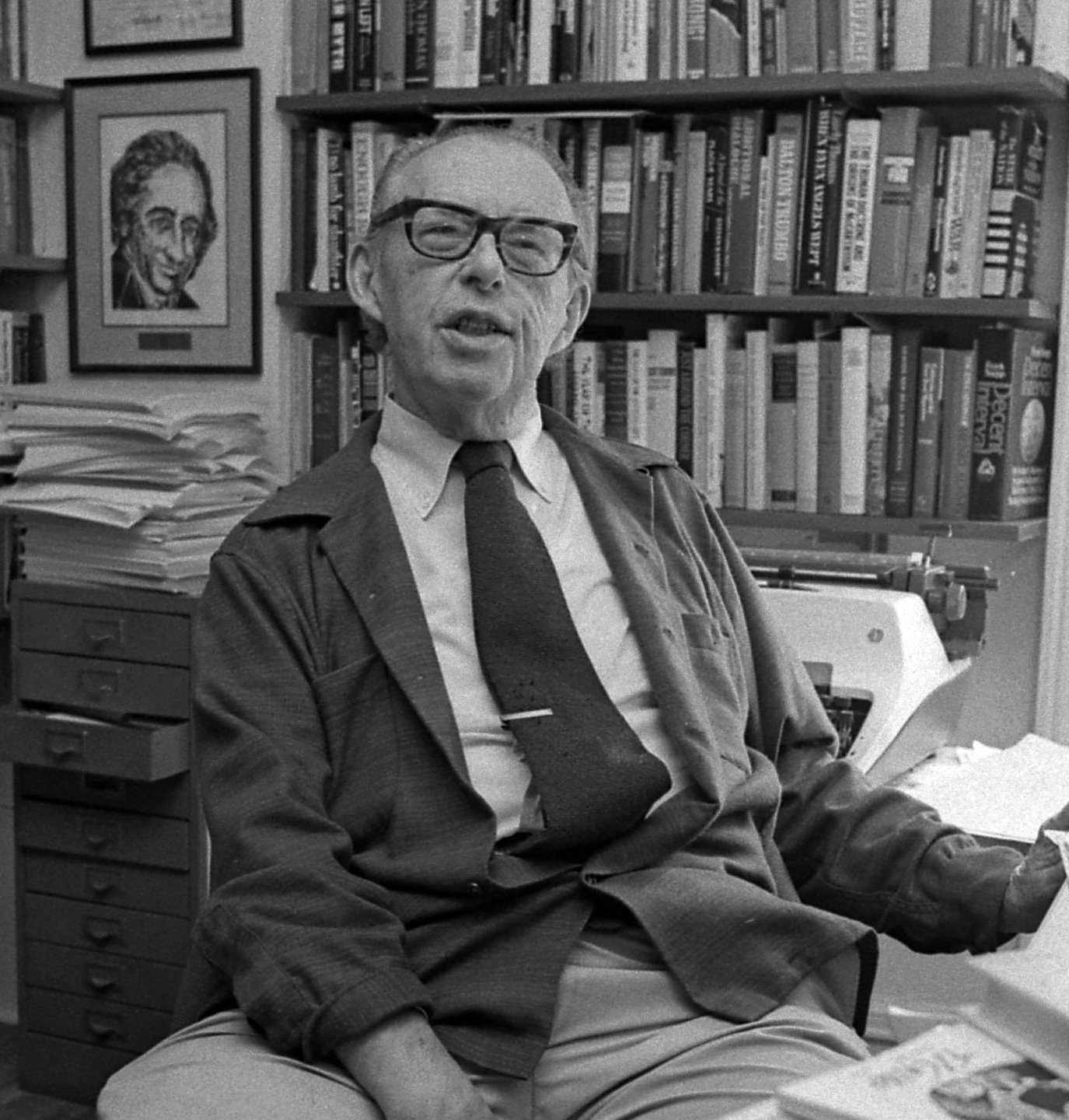
McWilliams in his office, 1978

After leaving the state government, McWilliams continued to write prolifically. He turned his attention to issues of racial and ethnic equality, writing a series of important books that included Prejudice (1945), A Mask for Privilege (1948), North from Mexico (1948) and Brothers Under the Skin (1951) which dealt with the treatment of immigrant and minority groups. He also produced two regional portraits, Southern California Country: An Island on the Land (1946, American Folkways series) and California: The Great Exception (1949), which many aficionados still regard as the finest interpretive histories of those areas. Decades after its publication, Southern California Country inspired Robert Towne's Oscar-winning original screenplay for Chinatown (1974).

In 1948, McWilliams supported former Vice President Henry A. Wallace for president.

In 1951, McWilliams moved to New York City to work at The Nation under editor Freda Kirchwey. For the next decade, he helped shepherd the magazine through its most difficult period so far. Taking over as editor in 1955, he stayed until 1975 and is credited with strengthening the magazine's investigative reporting. He also published the early work of Ralph Nader, Howard Zinn, Theodore Roszak, William Ryan and Hunter S. Thompson. Ryan credited McWilliams with challenging him to write what became his classic book 'Blaming the victim' (1971). Thompson credited McWilliams with the idea for his first bestselling book, Hell's Angels: A Strange and Terrible Saga (1967).

== Accusations of communist sympathies ==
Witch Hunt (1950) was an early attempt to combat McCarthyism, which McWilliams considered a grave threat to civil liberties and healthy politics. Although he was never a member of the Communist Party, he was a frequent target of anticommunist attacks. In the 1940s, he was called before the Committee on Un-American Activities in California. FBI Director J. Edgar Hoover placed him on the Custodial Detention List and this made him a candidate for detention in case of national emergency even though McWilliams was serving in the state government at the time.

Several years later, a group of Los Angeles screenwriters, directors, and producers known as the Hollywood Ten was cited for contempt of Congress after refusing to answer a House committee's questions about Communist Party membership. McWilliams drafted a Supreme Court amicus brief for two of them, John Howard Lawson and Dalton Trumbo. (The Court declined to hear their appeal.)

== McWilliams and Bay of Pigs story ==
McWilliams was the first American reporter to reveal that the CIA was training a group of Cuban exiles in Guatemala for the Bay of Pigs Invasion. His article for The Nation, "Are We Training Cuban Guerrillas?", was published in November 1960, during the Eisenhower Administration, five months before the invasion occurred.

The story was largely ignored by major newspapers like The New York Times and The Washington Post. Arthur M. Schlesinger, Jr., an aide to President John F. Kennedy, pressured The New Republic not to run a story about the guerrilla force. Following the failure of the invasion, Kennedy expressed regret that more information about the invasion plan was not published by telling Times reporter Turner Catledge, "If you had printed more about the operation, you would have saved us from a colossal mistake."

== Death and legacy ==
McWilliams died in New York City on June 27, 1980, at 74. Since his death, his critical fortunes have risen steadily. The American Political Science Association gives an annual Carey McWilliams Award "to honor a major journalistic contribution to our understanding of politics." In Embattled Dreams (2002), California historian Kevin Starr calls McWilliams "the single finest nonfiction on California–ever," and biographer Peter Richardson maintains that McWilliams might be the most versatile American public intellectual of the twentieth century.

His first son, Wilson Carey McWilliams, was a noted political scientist who taught at Rutgers University. His second son, Jerry McWilliams, was an expert on vinyl disc records preservation. McWilliams had two grandchildren: Susan McWilliams Barndt, a professor of politics at Pomona College, and Helen McWilliams, the lead singer of VAGIANT Boston.

McWilliams's papers are housed in the Bancroft Library at the University of California, Berkeley and at Special Collections at the University of California, Los Angeles.

== Works ==
- Ambrose Bierce: A Biography (New York: A. & C. Boni, 1929). Revised edition: Archon Books, 1967.
- America Is In the Heart, A Personal History, by Carlos Bulosan: Introduction by Carey McWilliams (Seattle: University of Washington Press, 1973; reissue 2014 with addition of New Introduction by Marilyn C. Alquizola and Lane Ryo Hirabayashi)
- Brothers Under the Skin: African-Americans and Other Minorities. (Boston: Little, Brown and Company, 1943).
- California: The Great Exception (New York: Current Books, 1949).
- (Edited by McWilliams) The California Revolution, (New York: Grossman Publishers, 1968).
- The Education of Carey McWilliams (New York: Simon and Schuster, 1979).
- Factories in the Field: The Story of Migratory Farm Labor in California (Boston: Little, Brown and Company, 1939).
- Ill Fares the Land: Migrants and Migratory Labor in the United States (Boston: Little, Brown and Company, 1942).
- Louis Adamic and Shadow-America (Los Angeles: A. Whipple, 1935).
- A Mask for Privilege: Anti-Semitism in America (Boston: Little, Brown, 1948).
- The Mexicans in America: A Students’ Guide to Localized History (New York: Teachers College Press, 1968).
- North from Mexico: The Spanish-Speaking People of the US (Philadelphia: Lippincott, 1949).
- Politics of Personality: California, The Nation, October 27, 1962.
- Prejudice: Japanese-Americans, Symbol of Racial Intolerance (Boston: Little, Brown, 1944).
- Race Discrimination – and the Law (New York: National Federation for Constitutional Liberties, 1945).
- Small Farm and Big Farm (New York: Public Affairs Committee, 1945).
- Southern California Country: An Island on the Land (American Folkways series, New York: Duell, Sloan & Pearce, 1946). Also published as Southern California: An Island on the Land (Santa Barbara: Peregrine Smith, 1973).
- What About Our Japanese-Americans? (New York: Public Affairs Committee, 1944).
- Witch Hunt: The Revival of Heresy (Boston: Little, Brown, 1950).
