= Public display of affection (disambiguation) =

A public display of affection (PDA) is an act of physical intimacy in the view of others.

Public display(s) of affection may also refer to:

- A Public Display of Affection, a 2006 album by the Blizzards
- Public Displays of Affection (EP), a 2021 EP by Muni Long
- Public Displays of Affection Too, a 2022 EP by Muni Long
- Public Displays of Affection: The Album, a 2022 album by Muni Long
- "Public Displays of Affection" (Below Deck), a 2020 television episode
- "Public Displays of Affection" (A Remarkable Place to Die), a 2024 television episode

== See also ==
- Public Display of Infection, an album by Tijuana Sweetheart
- Public Affection, the former name of the band Live
