= Wilson Carey McWilliams =

American academic

Wilson Carey McWilliams (2 September 1933 – 29 March 2005), son of Carey McWilliams, was a political scientist at Rutgers University.

== Biography ==
McWilliams served in the 11th Airborne Division of the United States Army from 1955 to 1961, after which he took his master's degree and Ph.D. degrees at the University of California, Berkeley. There he studied under Sheldon Wolin, John Schaar and Norman Jacobson, and also recognized the influences of political theorists Leo Strauss and Bertrand de Jouvenel. He wrote a Masters thesis on the political realism of Hans Morgenthau and Reinhold Niebuhr. He was also active in the early stages of the Berkeley Free Speech Movement and the student activist group SLATE.

Prior to teaching at Rutgers University he taught at Oberlin College and Brooklyn College. He was also a visiting professor at Yale University, Harvard University and Haverford College. He came to Yale in the Spring of 1969 with a timely and provocative seminar on "American Radical Thought". At Harvard he taught the evening seminar "American Political Theory in the 19th Century" during the spring of 1998, a popular course attended by several professors including Harvey Mansfield. As a visiting professor he went out of his way to connect with the students in his courses (and sometimes in nearby bars).

McWilliams was the recipient of the John Witherspoon Award for Distinguished Service to the Humanities, conferred by the New Jersey Committee for the Humanities, and also served as a vice-president of the American Political Science Association.

Recordings are available of his last class, American Political Thought since the Civil War, which was continued after his death by his daughter, Susan McWilliams Barndt, a Ph.D. candidate in the department of politics at Princeton University at the time and currently a professor of politics at Pomona College.

At the time of his death, McWilliams had been married for more than 30 years to the psychoanalyst and author Nancy Riley McWilliams. Their daughter Helen McWilliams was the lead singer of VAGIANT Boston.

== Writings ==
McWilliams was author of The Idea of Fraternity in America (1973, University of California Press), for which he won the National Historical Society prize in 1974. In this book, McWilliams argued that there was an "alternative tradition" to the dominant liberal tradition in America, which he variously traced through the thought of the Puritans, the Anti-federalists, and various major and minor literary figures such as Hawthorne, Melville, Twain and Ellison. He argued that this tradition drew philosophical inspiration from ancient Greek and Christian sources manifested in an emphasis upon community and fraternity, which was properly the means to achieving a form of civic liberty. He contrasted this tradition with the liberal tradition, which conversely held that individual liberty was thought to culminate in political fraternity. A major influence on McWilliams's thought was the book Democracy in America by the French theorist Alexis de Tocqueville, and like Tocqueville, McWilliams commended to modern liberal democracy the arts of association and a chastening form of religious faith.

McWilliams was also a prolific essayist, whose works appeared in Commonweal and other journals. His essays on American elections from 1976 to 1998 were collected in two volumes, The Politics of Disappointment (1995, Chatham House) and Beyond the Politics of Disappointment (2000, Chatham House). In 2011, two edited collections of his essays were published, co-edited by Patrick J. Deneen and his daughter, Susan J. McWilliams. The books were entitled, respectively, Redeeming Democracy in America (University Press of Kansas, 2011) and The Democratic Soul: A Wilson Carey McWilliams Reader (University Press of Kentucky, 2011).
