= Michael Kraus =

Michael Kraus may refer to:

- Michael Kraus (soccer) (born 1984), American soccer player
- Michael Kraus (field hockey) (born 1958), American Olympic hockey player
- Michael Kraus (handballer) (born 1983), German handball player
- Michael Kraus (psychologist) (born 1981), American social psychologist
- Michael Kraus (minister) (1908–2003), Canadian entrepreneur and minister
- Michael Kraus (swimmer) (born 1955), German former swimmer
- Michael Kraus (baritone) (born 1957), Austrian operatic baritone

== See also ==
- Michael Krauss (disambiguation)
