= Michael Kraus (psychologist) =

American social psychologist and academic

- Born: 1981 (age 44–45)
- Education: University of California, Berkeley (BA, MA, PhD)
- Known for: inequality, social class, racism, emotion
- Children: 2
- Scientific career
- Fields: Social psychology
- Workplaces: University of Illinois Urbana-Champaign; Yale University; Northwestern University
- Thesis: Social Class, Essentialism, and Restorative Policy Decisions (2010)
- Doctoral advisor: Dacher Keltner
- Website: www.michaelwkraus.com

Michael W. Kraus (born 1981) is an American social psychologist and professor of psychology at Northwestern University. He currently leads the Contending with Societal Inequality Laboratory. Previously, he was an associate professor of Organizational Behavior at the Yale School of Management. His research examines inequality, race, power, emotion, empathy, and social cognition. Kraus is known for research on social class, status signaling, racial economic inequality, and public misperceptions of racial progress.

== Education ==
Kraus received his B.A. in psychology and sociology from the University of California, Berkeley in 2003. He later earned an M.A. in psychology from Berkeley in 2006 and a Ph.D. in psychology in 2010.

== Career ==
Kraus was a psychology and medicine postdoctoral scholar at the University of California, San Francisco from 2010 to 2012, and an assistant professor of psychology at the University of Illinois Urbana-Champaign from 2012 to 2015.

In 2015, Kraus joined the Yale School of Management as an assistant professor of organizational behavior. He was promoted to associate professor in 2020 and held a courtesy appointment in psychology. His work at Yale included research on social class, prejudice, racial inequality, inequality misperception, and organizational diversity, equity, and inclusion.

In 2022, Yale denied Kraus tenure, a decision that drew public attention and debate in higher education. An open letter signed by numerous academics urged Yale to reconsider the decision and raised concerns about colorblindness and the evaluation of scholarship on racism and inequality. Kraus later wrote about the experience in The Chronicle of Higher Education.

Kraus was a visiting scholar at the Russell Sage Foundation during the 2023–2024 academic year. In 2024, he joined Northwestern University as professor of psychology and Morton O. Schapiro Faculty Fellow at the Institute for Policy Research.

== Research ==
Kraus's research examines how inequality shapes social perception, emotion, interpersonal behavior, and public beliefs about society.

His early work examined social class as a psychological and cultural context. With Paul Piff, Dacher Keltner, and colleagues, Kraus argued that lower-class contexts tend to foster contextual awareness and interdependence, whereas upper-class contexts tend to foster agency and self-focus.

Kraus has also studied how social class is communicated through behavioral signals. In a 2009 study, Kraus and Keltner found that observers could infer socioeconomic status from brief video clips of social interaction. In later work, he examined class signals in clothing and speech.

Kraus's work on economic mobility has examined how Americans overestimate the likelihood of upward class mobility. In a 2015 New York Times opinion, Kraus discussed research showing that Americans overestimate the accessibility of the American dream.

Another area of Kraus's research concerns emotion, empathy, compassion, and prosocial behavior. In a 2010 study of the National Basketball Association, Kraus and colleagues found that early-season physical touch among teammates predicted later individual and team performance, with cooperation accounting for the association between touch and team performance. The study later received attention in professional sports, including coverage of Jacksonville Jaguars head coach Liam Coen referencing it in discussions of team culture.

In work with Jennifer Richeson and colleagues, Kraus has studied public misperceptions of racial economic inequality. In a 2017 article in the Proceedings of the National Academy of Sciences, Kraus et al. reported that Americans substantially overestimated Black–White economic equality across several domains. A 2019 article argued that Americans underestimate racial economic inequality, especially the Black–White wealth gap, in part because of racial progress narratives and meritocracy beliefs. Kraus has written about these themes in public commentary, including in the Los Angeles Times.

Recent work by Kraus has examined anti-Asian racism, Asian American solidarity, and misperceptions of Asian representation. In a recent paper, his lab studied perceptions of Asian subgroup representation in STEM, finding that participants misperceived representation among Chinese, Japanese, Korean, Indian, Filipino, and Vietnamese subgroups.

== Awards and honors ==
- Rising Star, Association for Psychological Science, 2013
- Fellow, Society of Experimental Social Psychology, 2016
- Emerging Leadership Award, American Psychological Association Committee on Socioeconomic Status, 2017
- Sage Young Scholars Award, Society for Personality and Social Psychology, 2018
- Fellow, Association for Psychological Science, 2020
- Fellow, Society for Personality and Social Psychology, 2020
- Graduate Mentor Award in the Social Sciences, Yale University, 2020
- Diversity Science Award, Society of Experimental Social Psychology, 2025
- Fellow, Midwestern Psychological Association, 2026

== Selected publications ==
- Kraus, Michael W.; Keltner, Dacher (2009). "Signs of socioeconomic status: A thin-slicing approach". Psychological Science. 20 (1): 99–106. doi:10.1111/j.1467-9280.2008.02251.x. PMID 19076316.
- Kraus, Michael W.; Côté, Stéphane; Keltner, Dacher (2010). "Social class, contextualism, and empathic accuracy". Psychological Science. 21 (11): 1716–1723. doi:10.1177/0956797610387613. PMID 20974714.
- Kraus, Michael W.; Huang, Cassy; Keltner, Dacher (2010). "Tactile communication, cooperation, and performance: An ethological study of the NBA". Emotion. 10 (5): 745–749. doi:10.1037/a0019382. PMID 21038960.
- Piff, Paul K.; Kraus, Michael W.; Côté, Stéphane; Cheng, Bonnie Hayden; Keltner, Dacher (2010). "Having less, giving more: The influence of social class on prosocial behavior". Journal of Personality and Social Psychology. 99 (5): 771–784. Bibcode:2010JPSP...99..771P. doi:10.1037/a0020092. PMID 20649364.
- Kraus, Michael W.; Piff, Paul K.; Keltner, Dacher (2011). "Social class as culture: The convergence of resources and rank in the social realm". Current Directions in Psychological Science. 20 (4): 246–250. doi:10.1177/0963721411414654.
- Kraus, Michael W.; Piff, Paul K.; Mendoza-Denton, Rodolfo; Rheinschmidt, Michelle L.; Keltner, Dacher (2012). "Social class, solipsism, and contextualism: How the rich are different from the poor". Psychological Review. 119 (3): 546–572. doi:10.1037/a0028756. PMID 22775498.
- Kraus, Michael W.; Tan, Jacinth J. X. (2015). "Americans overestimate social class mobility". Journal of Experimental Social Psychology. 58: 101–111. doi:10.1016/j.jesp.2015.01.005.
- Kraus, Michael W.; Rucker, Julian M.; Richeson, Jennifer A. (2017). "Americans misperceive racial economic equality". Proceedings of the National Academy of Sciences. 114 (39): 10324–10331. Bibcode:2017PNAS..11410324K. doi:10.1073/pnas.1707719114. PMC 5625917. PMID 28923915.
- Kraus, Michael W.; Onyeador, Ivuoma N.; Daumeyer, Natalie M.; Rucker, Julian M.; Richeson, Jennifer A. (2019). "The misperception of racial economic inequality". Perspectives on Psychological Science. 14 (6): 899–921. doi:10.1177/1745691619863049. PMID 31505132.
- Kraus, Michael W.; Torrez, Brittany; Park, Jun Won; Ghayebi, Fariba (2019). "Evidence for the reproduction of social class in brief speech". Proceedings of the National Academy of Sciences. 116 (46): 22998–23003. Bibcode:2019PNAS..11622998K. doi:10.1073/pnas.1900500116. PMC 6859342. PMID 31636176.
- Callaghan, Bennett; Harouni, Leila; Dupree, Cydney H.; Kraus, Michael W.; Richeson, Jennifer A. (2021). "Testing the efficacy of three informational interventions for reducing misperceptions of the Black–White wealth gap". Proceedings of the National Academy of Sciences. 118 (38) e2108875118. Bibcode:2021PNAS..11808875C. doi:10.1073/pnas.2108875118. PMC 8463878. PMID 34518229.
- Callaghan, Bennett; Delgadillo, Quinton M.; Kraus, Michael W. (2022). "The influence of signs of social class on compassionate responses to people in need". Frontiers in Psychology. 13 936170. doi:10.3389/fpsyg.2022.936170. PMC 9455153. PMID 36092048.
- Torrez, Brittany; Hollie, LaStarr; Richeson, Jennifer A.; Kraus, Michael W. (2024). "The misperception of organizational racial progress toward diversity, equity, and inclusion". American Psychologist. 79 (4): 581–592. doi:10.1037/amp0001230. PMID 37982780.
- Vinluan, A. Chyei; Kraus, Michael W. (2026). "The misperception of Asian subgroup representation in STEM". Communications Psychology. 4 (1) 21. doi:10.1038/s44271-025-00389-1. PMC 12873391. PMID 41484181.
