= Paul Piff =

American Psychologist and Professor

- Paul Piff at the 2026 Ig Nobel Prize Ceremony
- Born: Paul Kayhan Piff; 1981 (age 44–45)
- Education: Reed College (BA); University of California, Berkeley (MA, PhD)
- Known for: Research on social class and ethics, psychology of awe
- Awards: SAGE Young Scholar Award (2019); APS Rising Star (2016); NSF Graduate Research Fellowship
- Scientific career
- Fields: Social psychology
- Workplaces: University of California, Irvine
- Doctoral advisor: Dacher Keltner

Paul Kayhan Piff (born c. 1981) is an American social psychologist and Associate Professor of Psychology at the University of California, Irvine. His research focuses on social class, economic inequality, moral behavior, prosocial tendencies, and the social functions of emotions such as awe.

His work has been the subject of national media coverage, including a cover profile in New York magazine. In 2013 he delivered a TEDx talk titled “Does Money Make You Mean?”, presenting research on inequality to a public audience. The talk has received several million views online. He has also appeared in documentary films including Park Avenue: Money, Power and the American Dream and Capital in the Twenty-First Century.

== Education and early career ==
Piff grew up in Seattle, Washington, before moving at age four with his family to Haifa, Israel, where his father worked as an archivist, and his mother was a translator for the Baha'i World Center.

He received a B.A in psychology from Reed College in 2004. He earned his M.A. (2008) and Ph.D. (2012) in psychology from the University of California, Berkeley, where he studied under Dacher Keltner. His doctoral dissertation, received the First Prize Social Issues Dissertation Award from the Society for the Psychological Study of Social Issues (Division 9 (SPSSI) of the American Psychological Association).

Following postdoctoral research at UC Berkeley (2012–2014), Piff joined the faculty at the University of California, Irvine in 2014 and was promoted to Associate Professor in 2020. He has also served in leadership roles associated with UCI’s poverty and inequality research initiatives.

== Research ==
Piff's work focuses on three areas: social class and ethics, the psychology of awe, and theoretical accounts of social class as a cultural system.

=== Social class and ethics ===
In a 2010 paper published in the Journal of Personality and Social Psychology, Piff and colleagues reported that individuals from lower socioeconomic backgrounds exhibited higher levels of generosity and prosocial behavior than those from wealthier backgrounds.

His most widely discussed work, published in 2012 in the Proceedings of the National Academy of Sciences, is titled “Higher social class predicts increased unethical behavior.” Across seven studies, the paper reported that individuals from higher social classes were more likely to break traffic laws, engage in unethical decision-making in hypothetical scenarios, take valued goods from others, lie in negotiations, and endorse unethical behavior at work. The research suggested that favorable attitudes toward greed may contribute to these differences. The paper received widespread media coverage and has been widely cited in the academic literature.

The PNAS paper also attracted scholarly criticism and subsequent replication efforts. Statistician Greg Francis published a response arguing that the probability of all seven studies reaching statistical significance was unusually low, suggesting possible publication bias. Piff and his team published a reply in the same journal, critiquing Francis’s statistical approach; others have raised similar concerns. In 2017, researchers at the University of Western Ontario identified a mathematical error in the original paper; Piff’s team acknowledged it as minor and not affecting the overall conclusions, and in turn noted an inversion error in the replication team’s analysis. Corrections were issued, described by Retraction Watch as a collaborative exchange. Regarding the original field studies on driver behavior, Coughenour and colleagues replicated the patterns, finding that drivers of higher-cost cars were less likely to yield for pedestrians. However, Jung et al. (2023) published two preregistered direct replications and found no evidence of a relationship between vehicle status and unethical driving behavior.

In subsequent research, Piff reported in 2014 that wealthier individuals scored higher on measures of narcissism and entitlement, and that experimentally inducing feelings of egalitarianism was associated with reductions in these tendencies. A 2020 study published in Nature Human Behaviour found that shifting people's explanations for poverty from individual failings to situational and structural factors increased their opposition to inequality and support for egalitarian policies.

=== Awe and prosocial behavior ===
Piff's second major research area examines the psychological and social effects of awe. In a 2015 paper published in the Journal of Personality and Social Psychology, Piff and colleagues presented five studies demonstrating that experiences of awe diminish the emphasis on the individual self, what the authors termed "the small self" effect, which was associated with prosocial behavior such as generosity, helping, and ethical decision-making. In one field experiment, participants who spent a minute looking up at a grove of towering eucalyptus trees subsequently helped a researcher pick up more dropped pens than participants who looked up at a tall building.

Subsequent research has extended these findings to large-scale natural events. A 2022 study published in Psychological Science examined the 2017 total solar eclipse and found that communities in the path of totality showed increases in prosocial behavior and social cohesion compared with communities that experienced only a partial eclipse. Piff has also published research on how engagement with nature, particularly awe-inspiring natural environments such as giant sequoia groves, is associated with social connection and well-being, with support from the United States Forest Service.

=== Social class as culture ===
Together with Michael W. Kraus and Dacher Keltner, Piff has contributed to a theoretical framework that promotes social class as a distinct cultural system. Their 2011 paper in Current Directions in Psychological Science argued that social class shapes values, cognitive styles, and emotional patterns in ways comparable to ethnic or national cultures, with lower-class environments fostering more collectivist orientations and upper-class environments fostering more individualist ones. A more comprehensive review of this framework was published in 2012 in Psychological Review.

== Media and public engagement ==
=== TEDx talks ===
In 2013, Piff delivered a TEDx Marin talk titled “Does Money Make You Mean?”, in which he described a rigged Monopoly game experiment illustrating the effects of structural advantages on behavior. Participants given advantages exhibited more dominant behavior, consumed more from a shared bowl of snacks, and tended to attribute their success to personal strategy rather than structural factors. In September 2022, he returned to TEDx Marin with a talk on “The Science of Awe,” reflecting his research on the social functions of awe.

=== Media coverage ===
Piff has been profiled in New York magazine and his research has been covered in The New York Times, Scientific American, NPR, PBS NewsHour, CBC Radio, and the World Economic Forum. In 2012, New York magazine published a cover story by Lisa Miller titled "The Money-Empathy Gap," profiling Piff as "one of a new generation of scientists...who are exploiting this moment of unprecedented income inequality to explore behaviors." He has co-authored op-eds for The New York Times with Dacher Keltner and contributed pieces to PBS and the Los Angeles Times. On March 19, 2026, Piff appeared on the Outside Podcast episode "The Anti-Asshole Effect: The Surprising Science of Awe in Nature," discussing the science of awe, his field studies measuring the effects of awe at Lake Tahoe, and the documentary Beyond Awestruck: The Scientific Search for Connection, which followed that research.

=== Documentary appearances ===
Piff has appeared as an expert in several documentary films:

- Park Avenue: Money, Power and the American Dream (2012), directed by Alex Gibney, which aired on PBS Independent Lens and examines the wealth gap between Park Avenue's billionaires and the South Bronx.
- Capital in the Twenty-First Century (2019), directed by Justin Pemberton and based on Thomas Piketty's bestselling book, in which Piff discusses the rigged Monopoly experiment alongside economists and public intellectuals.
- 12th Hour (2021), directed by Susan Kucera, a documentary examining humanity's capacity to respond to climate change.
- Giants Rising (2024), written and directed by Lisa Landers, in which Piff discusses the impacts of experiencing awe.
- Beyond Awestruck: The Scientific Search for Connection (2026), directed by Richard Yelland, which followed Piff and his research team from the University of California, Irvine as they measured the effects of awe at Lake Tahoe.

== Awards and honors ==
- 2020 – Dean's Award for Inclusionary Excellence, School of Social Ecology, UC Irvine
- 2019 – Sage Young Scholar Award, Society for Personality and Social Psychology
- 2017 – Fellow, Society of Experimental Social Psychology
- 2016 – Rising Star, Association for Psychological Science
- 2015 – Emerging Leadership in Psychology, American Psychological Association Committee on Socioeconomic Status
- 2012 – First Prize, Social Issues Dissertation Award, Society for the Psychological Study of Social Issues (Division 9 of the APA)
- 2008–2011 – National Science Foundation Graduate Research Fellowship
- 2004 – Phi Beta Kappa, Reed College

== Selected publications ==
- Piff, Paul K.; Kraus, Michael W.; Côté, Stéphane; Cheng, Bonnie Hayden; Keltner, Dacher (2010). "Having less, giving more: The influence of social class on prosocial behavior". Journal of Personality and Social Psychology. 99 (5): 771–784. doi:10.1037/a0020092. PMID 20649364.
- Piff, Paul K.; Stancato, Daniel M.; Côté, Stéphane; Mendoza-Denton, Rodolfo; Keltner, Dacher (2012). "Higher social class predicts increased unethical behavior". Proceedings of the National Academy of Sciences. 109 (11): 4086–4091. doi:10.1073/pnas.1118373109. PMC 3306667.
- Kraus, Michael W.; Piff, Paul K.; Mendoza-Denton, Rodolfo; Rheinschmidt, Michelle L.; Keltner, Dacher (2012). "Social class, solipsism, and contextualism: How the rich are different from the poor". Psychological Review. 119 (3): 546–572. doi:10.1037/a0028756.
- Piff, Paul K. (2014). "Wealth and the inflated self: Class, entitlement, and narcissism". Personality and Social Psychology Bulletin. 40 (1): 34–43. doi:10.1177/0146167213501699.
- Piff, Paul K.; Dietze, Pia; Feinberg, Matthew; Stancato, Daniel M.; Keltner, Dacher (2015). "Awe, the small self, and prosocial behavior". Journal of Personality and Social Psychology. 108 (6): 883–899. doi:10.1037/pspi0000018.
- Piff, Paul K.; Kraus, Michael W.; Keltner, Dacher (2018). "Unpacking the inequality paradox: Psychological roots of inequality and social class". Advances in Experimental Social Psychology. 57: 53–124.
- Piff, Paul K.; Wiwad, Dylan; Robinson, Angela R.; Aknin, Lara B.; Mercier, Brett; Shariff, Azim (2020). "Shifting attributions for poverty motivates opposition to inequality and enhances egalitarianism". Nature Human Behaviour. 4: 496–505. doi:10.1038/s41562-020-0835-8.
- Goldy, Sean P.; Jones, Nickolas M.; Piff, Paul K. (2022). "The social effects of an awesome solar eclipse". Psychological Science. 33 (9): 1452–1462. doi:10.1177/09567976221085501.

== See also ==
- Greater Good Science Center
