= Michael Krauss =

Michael Krauss may refer to:

- Michael A. Krauss (born 1939), American television producer
- Michael E. Krauss (1934–2019), American linguist
- Michael I. Krauss (born 1951), American law professor

== See also ==
- Michael Kraus (disambiguation)
