= Harnett T. Kane =

American writer (1910–1984)

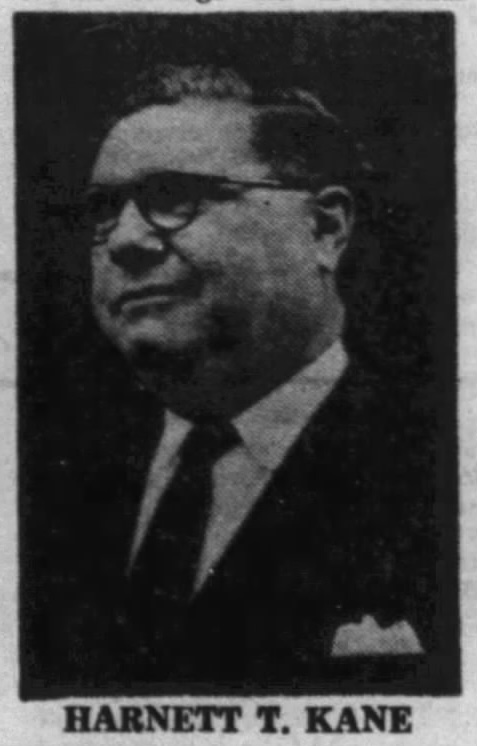
- Born: November 8, 1910; New Orleans, Louisiana, U.S.
- Died: September 4, 1984 (aged 73); New Orleans
- Occupations: Journalist, historian, novelist

Harnett Thomas Kane (November 8, 1910 – September 4, 1984) was a 20th-century American writer whose work focused on the history and culture of the U.S. South, particularly Louisiana and Mississippi. He is credited with 20 bestsellers, many of which were historical fiction who took their titles from notable female protagonists. He has been described as "one of the more colorful and prolific raconteurs" to write about Louisiana history.

== Life and work ==
Kane's non-fiction, including his contribution to the American Folkways series of regional profiles, is regarded as his most important work. His American Folkways volume, Deep Delta Country, has been called "the finest of Mr. Kane's writing, portraying, as it does with such vitality, the river land below New Orleans" In 1953 critic Sterling North wrote, "Harnett T. Kane's principal virtues as a writer are his excellent news and feature sense, his willingness to labor diligently at his research, and an ability to please his predominantly female readers. His flaws are excessive sentimentality and a genius for platitude." Kane is still read, with one local historian commenting in 2016, "By today's standards his writings might seem a bit romantic, wistful even, but his books record an attitude and a history that help us understand the inner thoughts of the Deep South."

A native of New Orleans, Kane started writing professionally while a student at Tulane University. According to the New York Times, in addition to his books, "was a frequent contributor of travel articles and book reviews to The New York Times, and also wrote for Reader's Digest, National Geographic, and Saturday Review." Kane died in 1984 after 17 years of Alzheimer's disease. The Harnett T. Kane Award of the Louisiana Landmarks Society was established in his honor.

== Selected titles ==
- Huey Long's Louisiana Hayride
- The Bayous of Louisiana
- Deep Delta Country
- Plantation Parade
- Natchez on the Mississippi
- New Orleans Woman
- The Lady of Arlington
- Spies for the Blue and Gray
- The Smiling Rebel
- The Amazing Mrs. Bonaparte
- Bride of Fortune
- The Gallant Mrs. Stonewall
- Queen New Orleans
- The Romantic South
- Young Mark Twain and The Mississippi
- Gentlemen, Swords and Pistols
- The Southern Christmas Book
- Gone Are the Days, an Illustrated History of the Old South
