= Park Avenue: Money, Power and the American Dream =

- Directed by: Alex Gibney
- Written by: Alex Gibney; Chad Beck; Adam Bolt
- Produced by: Blair Foster
- Starring: Jack Abramoff; Michele Bachmann
- Narrated by: Alex Gibney
- Cinematography: Ronan Killeen; Lisa Rinzler
- Edited by: Erin Barnett; Chad Beck; Adam Bolt
- Music by: Peter Nashel
- Production company: BBC
- Distributed by: PBS
- Release date: February 12, 2012 (Frontline Club)
- Running time: 70 minutes
- Country: United States
- Language: English

Park Avenue: Money, Power and the American Dream is a 2012 documentary film about the wealth gap in the United States directed by Alex Gibney.

== Summary ==
The documentary compares the access to opportunities of residents of Park Avenue both on the Upper East Side and in the South Bronx. It draws upon Michael Gross's book 740 Park: The Story of the World's Richest Apartment Building, which showed that many billionaires live in that building. It goes on to explain that billionaire heir David Koch made significant donations to Paul Ryan in the same way that banker Steven Schwartzman lobbied Charles Schumer—for their own gain. The documentary includes interviews with a doorman at 740 Park Avenue, journalist Jane Mayer, Yale University Professor Jacob Hacker, University of California, Berkeley Professor Paul Piff, and Republican advisor Bruce Bartlett.

== Critical reception ==
Reviewing it for The New York Times, Neil Genzlinger deplored the fact that the documentary equated great wealth with "callousness," adding that many wealthy people are very generous with their resources. In The Daily Telegraph, Neil Midgley compared it to Michael Moore's documentaries. He went on to suggest that it was "not entirely unconvincing," calling it "demagoguery." He concluded that it was "a poor contribution." Writing for The New York Observer, Kim Velsey suggested, "the documentary unfurls like a crime story." She concluded that the documentary "makes a compelling case that inequality imperils democracy and that the victims of the inequality include not only those who find themselves in the rapidly expanding underclass, but the American dream itself." The film was the subject of a WNET scheduling controversy in 2012.
