= Dacher Keltner =

American psychologist

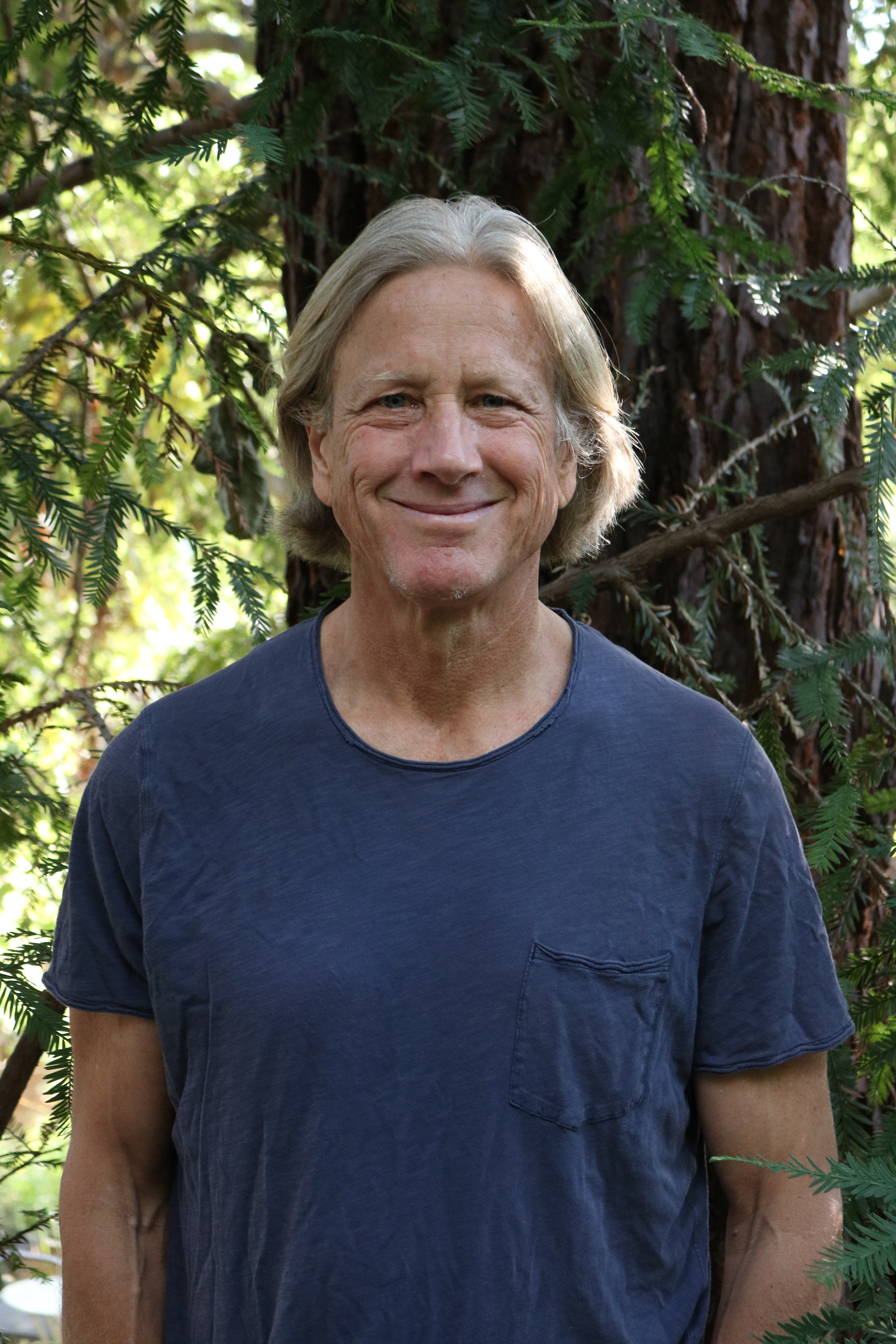
- Dacher Keltner in 2023
- Born: Jalisco, Mexico
- Education: University of California at Santa Barbara (BA); Stanford University (PhD)
- Scientific career
- Fields: Psychology
- Institutions: University of California, Berkeley 1996–present University of Wisconsin–Madison 1992–1996
- Thesis: Misperceptions of the Other Side's Views: A Source of Conflict and Conflict Resolution (1989)
- Doctoral advisor: Lee Ross
- Website: psychology.berkeley.edu/people/dacher-keltner

Dacher Joseph Keltner is a Mexican-born American psychologist. He is Distinguished Professor of psychology, director of the Berkeley Social Interaction Lab, and founding faculty director of the Greater Good Science Center at University of California, Berkeley. He is widely known for his work on emotion and as a foundational figure in establishing the scientific study of prosocial emotions, especially awe and compassion. He has also brought that research to a broad public audience. In 2020 he was elected to the American Academy of Arts and Sciences. In 2026 he received the William James Fellow Award, a lifetime-achievement award from the Association for Psychological Science.

== Early life and education ==
Keltner was born in Jalisco, Mexico, to two early members of the counterculture. Keltner's mother, a literature professor, and father, an artist and firefighter, raised both him and his brother in Laurel Canyon in the 1970s. When his mother secured her first job as a professor, they moved to a conservative town in the foothills of the California Sierra Nevada. When Keltner was in high school, their family relocated to Nottingham, England.

Keltner received his B.A. in psychology and sociology from the University of California, Santa Barbara, in 1984, he received his Ph.D. from Stanford University in 1989, and he completed three years of post-doctoral work with Paul Ekman at the University of California, San Francisco.

== Academic career ==
Keltner began his academic career at the University of Wisconsin–Madison, and then returned to University of California, Berkeley's Psychology Department in 1996 attaining full professorship in 2002.

His research focuses on the cultural and evolutionary origins of compassion, awe, love, beauty, and power, social class, and social inequality.

Keltner is the co-author of two textbooks, as well as the best-selling Born to Be Good: The Science of a Meaningful Life, The Compassionate Instinct, The Power Paradox: How We Gain and Lose Influence, and most recently, the national bestseller AWE: The New Science of Everyday Wonder and How it Can Transform Your Life. Keltner has published over 230 scientific articles and has written for The New York Times Magazine, The New York Times, The London Times, The Wall Street Journal, SLATE, Utne Reader. He has received numerous national prizes and grants for his research, teaching, and writing, and is a member of the american Academy of Arts and Sciences.

His Science of Happiness MOOC at EdX has had over 600,000 enrollees. Wired magazine recently rated his podcasts from his course Emotion as one of the five best educational downloads, and the Utne Reader selected Keltner for one of its 50 2008 visionaries.

Keltner has collaborated with directors at Pixar, including film director and animator Pete Docter in his films Inside Out and Soul. He has worked and continues to work with Facebook engineers and designers on projects such as Facebook stickers and Facebook reactions. He has also worked on projects at Google on altruism and emotion, and was recently featured in Tom Shadyac’s movie I Am.

Keltner is collaborated with the Sierra Club to get veterans and inner city adolescents outdoors. Building upon his experiences in a restorative justice program with prisoners in San Quentin Prison, Keltner wrote a brief for a case – Ashker v. Governor of California – that led to the curtailment of solitary confinement in maximum-security prisons in California.

He is also the founder and faculty director of the Greater Good Science Center.

=== Theory of power ===
Together with Deborah H. Gruenfeld of the Stanford Graduate School of Business and Cameron Anderson, psychologist at the Haas School of Business at UC Berkeley, Keltner has developed the Approach/Inhibition Theory of Power, which aims to present an integrative account of the effects of power on human behavior, suggesting that the acquisition of power has a disinhibiting effect regarding the social consequences of exercising it.

=== Social class ===
With collaborators Paul Piff and Michael Kraus, Keltner has offered a theoretical account of how social class shapes human thought, feeling, and action. In empirical demonstrations of this work, Keltner has shown that people from more privileged class backgrounds are more likely to drive through pedestrian crosswalks and cheat on tests to win a prize, feel less compassion than those who suffer, and explain their success in terms of their own superior traits.

=== Human emotion ===
Keltner has been a central voice in making the case that emotions serve important social functions, enabling us to fold into relationships vital to survival, like friendships, groups, romantic partnerships, and parent-child attachments. Guided by this framework, Keltner has done pioneering work on emotions like embarrassment, shame, love, compassion, amusement, and gratitude.

Beginning with his post-doctoral fellowship with Paul Ekman, Keltner has long studied emotional expression from a Basic Emotion perspective. He has done work documenting the universality of upwards of 20 distinct facial expressions, the richness with which people can communicate emotion in the voice, and how people communicate emotions like love, compassion, and gratitude through touch. In partnership with Alan Cowen, he has offered a new computational perspective on what emotions are. With a “data-driven” approach that maps people’s emotional experiences and expressions across the widest array of emotions studied to date and across different cultures, this work is finding that the emotion space involves upwards of 20 distinct states, that blends in emotion are common, that each emotion category has many variations within it, and that discrete emotion concepts (e.g., “awe” “sympathy”) rather than broader constructs such as valence or arousal drive the representation of emotional experience and recognition of emotion.

=== Awe ===
In 2003, Keltner and collaborator Jonathan Haidt authored a paper charting what awe is and how it influences our moral, spiritual and aesthetic lives. Building upon that paper, Keltner has done over 15 years of science on awe, summarized in AWE: The New Science of Everyday Wonder and how it Can Transform Your Life. This research shows that people find experiences of awe in what he calls the eight wonders of life: the moral beauty of others, nature, moving in unison, music, visual art, spirituality, big ideas, and life and death. Awe enables individuals to integrate into strong communities by inspiring cooperative tendencies and a more collective self. In a recent paper with collaborator Maria Monroy, Keltner has made the case that experiences of awe account for why things like music, spirituality, and psychedelics benefit health and well-being.

=== Science of happiness ===
In his book Born to be Good: The Science of a Meaningful Life, Keltner explores the science behind well-being. The book attempts to counter the bias that we are wired to be self-interested. Keltner explores the Confucian idea of the jen ratio; the relationship between actions that bring the good of others to completion and those that bring out bad. The greater score is a direct relation to your happiness. In the book he touches on the qualities of gratitude, compassion, play, awe, embarrassment and teasing and how these qualities are innate in people but also can be developed.

== Personal life ==
Keltner lives in Berkeley, California. He served as a consultant for the film Inside Out 2 and he is the host of the podcast The Science of Happiness.

== Books ==
- Keltner, Dacher (2009). Born to Be Good: The Science of a Meaningful Life. New York: W. W. Norton & Co. ISBN 9780393073355. OCLC 1243276435.
- Keltner, Dacher; Marsh, Jason; Smith, Jeremy Adam, eds. (2010). The Compassionate Instinct: The Science of Human Goodness. New York: W. W. Norton & Co. ISBN 9780393337280. OCLC 317920038.
- Keltner, Dacher (2016). The Power Paradox: How We Gain and Lose Influence. New York: Penguin Press. ISBN 9781594205248. OCLC 929055993.
- Keltner, Dacher; Oatley, Keith; Jenkins, Jennifer M (2019). Understanding Emotions (4th ed.). ISBN 9781119492535. OCLC 1045639702. prev. ed. published by Blackwell Publishers, 1996.
- Keltner, Dacher (January 3, 2023). Awe: The New Science of Everyday Wonder and How It Can Transform Your Life. Penguin Press. p. 336. ISBN 9781984879684. OCLC 1345466567.
- Thomas, Gilovich; Keltner, Dacher; Chen, Serena; Nisbett, Richard E (2023). Social Psychology (6th ed.). New York: W. W. Norton & Co. ISBN 9781324045557. prev. ed. published by W. W. Norton & Co., 2005.
