= John E. Seery =

American political theorist

- Born: John Evan Seery
- Occupation: Political theorist

Academic background
- Education: Amherst College; University of California, Berkeley

John Evan Seery is an American political theorist who specializes in the history of American political thought. He is the George Irving Thompson Memorial Professor of Government and Professor of Politics at Pomona College.

== Early life and education ==
Seery attended Amherst College, graduating in 1980, and subsequently received his doctorate from the University of California, Berkeley.

== Career ==
Seery began teaching at Pomona College in 1990. He is an advocate for the small liberal arts college model of higher education, and co-edited a book with Susan McWilliams on the topic. He has also written critiquing the growth of administrative bureaucracies in higher education.

== Works ==
- Political Returns: Irony in Politics and Theory from Plato to the Antinuclear Movement. Routledge. 1990. ISBN 9780367283551.
- Political Theory for Mortals: Shades of Justice, Images of Death. Cornell University Press. 1996. ISBN 978-0-8014-3259-0.
- America Goes to College: Political Theory for the Liberal Arts. Albany: State University of New York Press. November 2002. ISBN 978-0-7914-5591-3.
- Too Young to Run?: A Proposal for an Age Amendment to the U.S. Constitution. Pennsylvania State University Press. 2011. ISBN 978-0-271-04853-6.
