= Approach/Inhibition Theory of Power =

Psychology concept

The Approach/Inhibition Theory of Power was developed by Dacher Keltner in 2003. It states that power has the ability to transform individuals' psychological states. Most organisms have been shown to display one of the two types of reactions within the environment. These two types of reactions are approach and inhibition.

== Approach ==
Approach is associated with action, seeking rewards or opportunities, increase of physical energy and movement, and self-promotion. Power activates people, increasing their drive, energy, and emotion. Often, perceived power leads to many positive consequences. An increase in power, therefore, leads to approach behaviors.

== Inhibition ==
Inhibition is associated with reaction, protection of one's self, avoidance of potential threats and danger, vigilance, decrease of motivation, and reduced activity levels. A reduction in power leads to inhibition.
