= Michael Myerson =

American Communist activist and writer (born 1940)

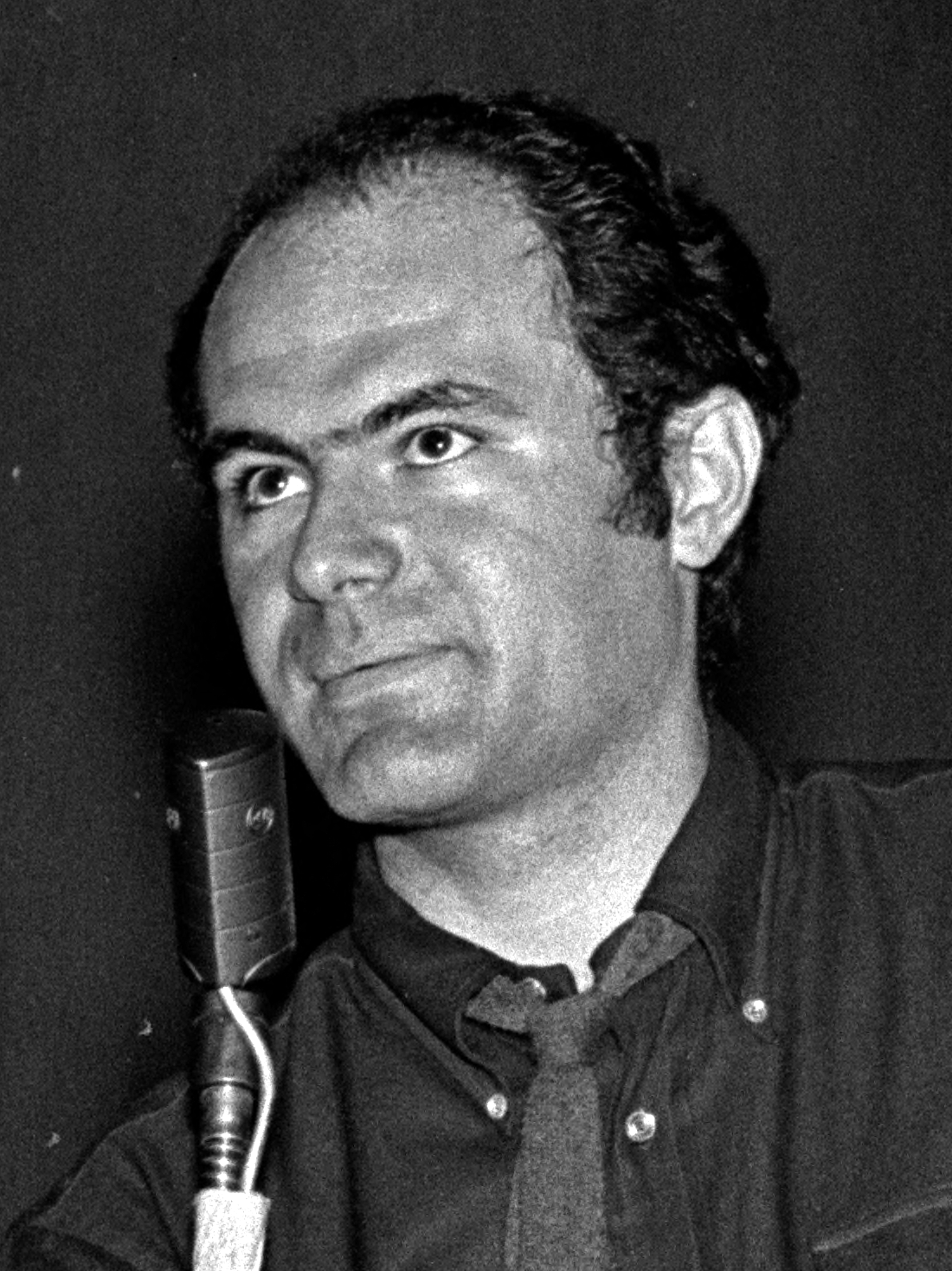
- Myerson in 1967
- Born: 1940 (age 85–86); Washington, D.C., U.S.
- Education: University of California, Berkeley
- Known for: President of SLATE; co-author of John J. Abt's memoir
- Political party: Communist Party USA
- Movement: Communism
- Spouse(s): Diane Burke (m. 1961; div. 1966) Laura Beth (m. 1976)
- Children: Molly; Jesse
- Parent(s): Seymour and Vivian Myerson

Michael Gene Myerson (born 1940) is an American writer and former member of the Communist Party USA, best known for serving as president of SLATE (1961–1962) and co-authoring the memoir of Ware Group member and CPUSA counsel John J. Abt (1993).

== Background ==
Michael Gene Myerson was born in 1940 in Washington, D.C., the son of Seymour (died 1987) and Vivian Myerson (1911–2011). His father came from a Yiddish-speaking, Orthodox, Rumanian Jewish home in Chicago, who spent his life under the name "Mike." His mother's parents came from Ukraine and Lithuania. He has two brothers, Alan and Mark. During World War II, they were living in Washington, D.C., where his father was an architect for the War Production Board and his mother an interior decorator. (He describes himself as a "child of a blacklisted set designer" during McCarthyism,) whose mentor was CPUSA executive committee member Gil Green.) In 1945, his family left Washington because his parents were both communists and moved to Los Angeles. (During the 1970s, his parents claimed that the police had harassed them at their home in the Echo Park district of Los Angeles. In 1977, his father sued the Los Angeles Police Department and in 1982 won an out-of-court settlement for $275,000.)

== Career ==
In 1958, Myerson arrived as a sophomore at the University of California-Berkeley, where he took part in the Free Speech Movement. Almost from his arrival, he was on the executive committee of SLATE, an early New Left free speech organization based at Berkeley. In 1961, he became SLATE president through 1962. Shortly thereafter, he graduated and was kicked off campus.

In 1962, Myerson became chairman and executive of the United States Festival Committee Inc. to the Communist World Festival in Helsinki, Finland, cited in a 1962 article in the Harvard Crimson, and became embroiled in some controversy when he claimed that this festival was "Communist-dominated." Myerson was member of the National Student Association (NSA) on its left-wing, unlike Tom Hayden and Al Haber, who were more centrist. In 1963, he joined a study ground he called a "W.E.B. DuBois Club" or "Marxist study youth group and equated with "Labor's Youth League... an arm of the Communist Party" and also state "to be in the Young Communist League was not to be in the Communist Party... I think it was an age thing." He helped for an "Ad Hoc Committee to End Discrimination" in the San Francisco Bay area to support the NAACP and CORE. Harry Bridges' daughter participated. In 1964, he protested the presidential campaign of Barry Goldwater as well as US President Lyndon Baynes Johnson for his position on the Vietnam War.

Myerson became a "Vietnam expert" based on a popular pamphlet he wrote on the war. In 1965, he organized a delegation to an Anti-Vietnam War Congress in Helsinki. There, a delegation from the National Liberation Front (NLF) from North Vietnam invited him to visit, based on his pamphlet. In August 1965, he traveled there with three other Americans: Harold Supriano, Christopher Koch, and Richard Ward. After that, Myerson went on a six-month tour of the US and spoke out against the Viet Nam War.

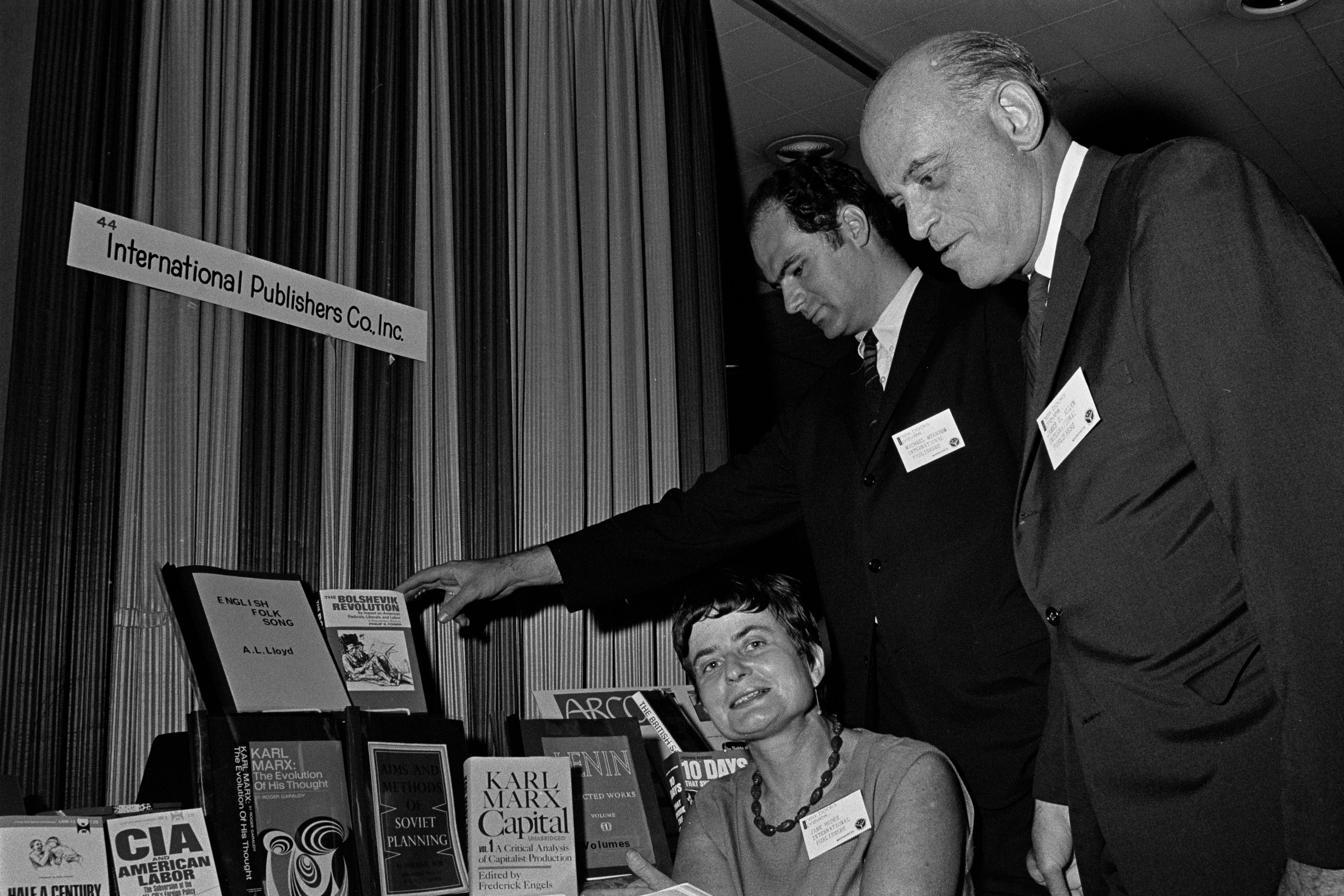
Myerson (left) reviews an International Publishers exhibit with fellow Communists James S. Allen (right) and Jane Hodes (seated) at a fall book preview exhibition at the Statler Hilton Hotel in New York City, September 1967

In 1966, Myerson left the Berkeley area in 1966 and went to New York City, where his older brother lived. That year, he described himself, as a "non-Communist, pro-American, and pro-human" in The Chicago Defender. In 1967, he appeared in a photo a Daily Worker photo with Tom Hayden, Stanley Aronowitz, Juan Angel Silen, Paul Krassner, and H. Rap Brown (Jamil Abdullah Al-Amin). In 1969, he was associated with an allegedly communist-affiliated Tri-Continental Information System. In 1970, he described much of these events in the book These are the Good Old Days.

In 1977, Myerson was a member of the central committee of the CPUSA as well as executive director of the US Peace Council, an affiliate of the World Peace Council.

In 1992, Myerson left the CPUSA along with Herbert Aptheker, Angela Davis, Gil Green, and Charlene Mitchell, and was affiliated with the Committees of Correspondence for Democracy and Socialism. In 1993, CPUSA counsel John J. Abt published his memoir, Advocate and Activist : Memoirs of an American Communist Lawyer, co-written with Myerson. In 1994, Myerson accused CPUSA leader Gus Hall of living a "good bourgeois life" including "an estate in fashionable Hampton Bays." In 1997, a New York Times obituary for Gil Green named Myerson as a "family friend." Myerson also sorted Green's papers.

== Personal life ==
On November 2, 1961, Myerson married Diane Burke; they divorced in 1966. Myerson married Laura Beth Myerson on March 17, 1976. They have two children together, Molly Myerson and Jesse A. Myerson

== Legacy ==
James W. Clinton wrote a whole chapter on Myerson in Loyal Opposition (1995).

Myerson also appears in Phillip Abbott Luce The New Left (1966), David Allen's The Dream of the New Left (1995), and Anthony Ashbolt's A Cultural History of the Radical Sixties in the San Francisco Bay Area (2015).

== Works ==
Books

- These are the Good Old Days: Coming of Age as a Radical in America's Late, Late Years (1970)
- Memories of Underdevelopment: The Revolutionary Films of Cuba (1973)
- Watergate: Crime in the Suites (1973)
- Nothing Could Be Finer (1978)
- The ILGWU: A Union That Fights for Lower Wages (1972–1983?)
- Advocate and Activist : Memoirs of an American Communist Lawyer (1993)

Articles

- "The Legacy of Clinton Jencks," Monthly Review (2020)
- "A Portrait of Gil Green," Monthly Review (2021)
- "A Life on the Court's Left," Jacobin (2021)
- "During the 1971 Prosecution of Angela Davis, I Fought the Law — And I Won," Jacobin (2021)
- "Forty Years Ago, a Million People Descended on New York's Central Park to Demand Peace," Jacobin (2022)
- "A Good Life Rule for Leftists: Never Talk to the FBI," Jacobin (2022)
- "A Real, Live Communist Who Wrestled With the Real, Live Communist Party," Jacobin (2022)
- "I Was a Communist Party Activist for Decades — and I Don't Regret It," Jacobin (2022)

== See also ==
- John J. Abt
- Gil Green (communist)
- Communist Party of the United States of America
- SLATE
- New Left
