= Susan McWilliams Barndt =

American political theorist

Susan McWilliams Barndt (née Susan Jane McWilliams; born January 6, 1977) is an American political theorist. She is the co-editor of the peer-reviewed academic journal American Political Thought and chairs the politics department at Pomona College.

== Early life and education ==
McWilliams was born on January 6, 1977, and grew up in central New Jersey. Her father was political scientist Wilson Carey McWilliams, and her grandfather was political journalist Carey McWilliams. She became interested in politics from a young age. She attended Amherst College and subsequently received her doctorate in politics from Princeton University.

== Career ==
McWilliams began teaching at Pomona College in 2006, having been drawn to the college as a "dream school" by professor John Seery. She chairs its politics department.

She was the co-editor of the peer-reviewed academic journal American Political Thought. She is an advocate for the small liberal arts college model of higher education, and co-edited a book with Seery on the topic.

== Works ==
- Traveling Back: Toward a Global Political Theory. Oxford University Press. February 14, 2014. ISBN 9780199329687.
- The American Road Trip and American Political Thought. Lanham, Maryland: Lexington Books. July 6, 2020. ISBN 9781498556880.
- A Political Companion to James Baldwin. Lexington, Kentucky: University of Kentucky Press. 2017. ISBN 978-0-8131-6991-0.
- With Seery, John, eds. (2015). The Best Kind of College: An Insider's Guide to America's Small Liberal Arts Colleges. SUNY Press. ISBN 978-1-4384-5772-7.
