= Trash Candy =

Studio album by Tijuana Sweetheart
- Released: October 22, 2009
- Genre: Punk rock, alternative rock
- Label: Independent
- Producer: Richard Marr & Tijuana Sweetheart

Tijuana Sweetheart chronology
Public Display of Infection (2007)	Trash Candy (2009)	Under the Gun (2012)

Trash Candy is the second album by Boston rock band VAGIANT Boston (now known as Tijuana Sweetheart), released on October 22, 2009.

"No Mercy" and "Trash Candy" were released on the Rock Band Network in 2010. "Trash Candy" also plays over the end credits of Rock Band 3.

== Track listing ==
1. "Sugar Daddy" – 2:51
2. "Joellen" – 3:04
3. "No Mercy" – 2:39
4. "Take 'em All" – 2:13
5. "Second Coming" – 3:47
6. "Punk Jacket Clone" – 1:55
7. "Sticks & Stones" – 3:07
8. "Always on My Mind"– 3:02
9. "Trash Candy" - 2:27
