= Under the Gun (Tijuana Sweetheart album) =

Studio album by Tijuana Sweetheart
- Released: February 18, 2012
- Genre: Punk rock, alternative rock
- Label: Independent
- Producer: Richard Marr & Tijuana Sweetheart

Tijuana Sweetheart chronology
Trash Candy (2009)	Under the Gun (2012)

Under the Gun is the third album by Boston rock band Tijuana Sweetheart, released on February 18, 2012.

The tracks from this album have already been called "a fresh sonic blend of the Ramones, Rancid and the Go-Go's." Another reviewer in the Boston Phoenix said of their cover of the Misfits "Astro Zombies", "compensates for at least a-dozen-or-so of the hundreds of [poor] Misfits interpretations I’ve endured over the years." Further adding "they’ve outgrown any punky sameness, and Under the Gun smacks with stylistic growth. There’s poppy sweetness overlaying “Sunday,” and big honkin’ metal breakdowns on tracks such as “E.A.T.”" Under the Gun is a "pure punk album" with "a very defined and uncompromising sound", with some tracks even being compared to Motörhead.

== Track listing ==
1. "Fallout" – 2:51
2. "Sunday" – 3:42
3. "Dragging My Heels" – 2:38
4. "Heathcliff" – 1:47
5. "Vanity" – 2:00
6. "Pistol Whipped" – 2:28
7. "Last Transmission" – 3:04
8. "E.A.T." – 1:31
9. "Astrozombies" – 2:50
