= American Folkways series =

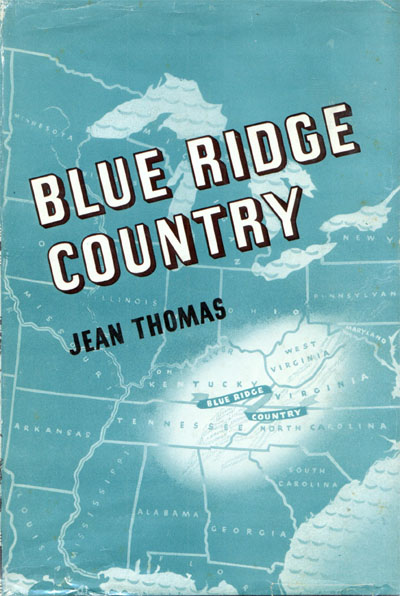
Cover of Blue Ridge Country.

The American Folkways is a 28-volume series of books, initiated and principally edited by Erskine Caldwell, and published by Duell, Sloan and Pearce from 1941 to 1955. Each book focused on a different region, or "folkway", of the United States, including documentary essays and folklore from that region. The books were written by local experts, describing their region. Many of the individual volumes have become regarded as classics in folklore, local history, and American writing, and a number of them have been issued in multiple editions or are still in print.

Caldwell initiated the series after returning to the United States from reporting on the German invasion of Russia. He had conceived of the series while in Europe, imagining an Americana regional series in which regionalists would "describe and interpret the indigenous quality of life". His proposal was rejected by editors Marshall Best and Harold Guinzburg at Viking, but accepted by Charles Duell and Samuel Sloan as a foundational series of their new press, and as an opportunity for their press to acquire Caldwell's future works.

In 1939, he began traversing the country, soliciting authors for the series, and by the end of the year had elicited commitments from five writers. Caldwell ultimately edited 25 volumes of the series (three additional volumes were published), and twenty separate regions were covered by the series. The volumes were intended to focus on cultural regions, not political boundaries. He rejected the term "folklore", choosing instead to use the term "folkways" to reflect "the study of contemporary life in terms of its social and economic implications." Caldwell was a detailed and focused editor, urging writers to hew to his vision – documenting and commenting on particular cultural regions, not sanitizing their subject, but reflective of the author's distinctive voice and regionalist character.

== Works in the series ==
- #1 Desert Country by Edwin Corle (1941)
- #3 Short Grass Country by Stanley Vestal (1941)
- #4 Big Country: Texas by Donald Day (1947)
- #8 Palmetto Country by Stetson Kennedy (1942)
- #9 Far North Country by Thames Williamson (1944)
- #13 North Star Country by Meridel Le Sueur (1945)
- # 15 or #16 Lower Piedmont Country: The Uplands of the Deep South by H. C. Nixon and Sarah N. Shouse (photographer) (1946)
- #20 Rocky Mountain Country by Albert Nathaniel Williams (1950)
- Piñon Country by Haniel Long (1941)
- Ozark Country by Otto Ernest Rayburn (1941)
- Blue Ridge Country by Jean Thomas (1942)
- Mormon Country by Wallace Stegner (1942)
- High Border Country by Eric Thane (1942)
- Deep Delta Country by Harnett Thomas Kane (1944)
- Golden Gate Country by Gertrude Franklin Horn Atherton (1945)
- Town Meeting Country by Clarence Mertoun Webster (1945)
- Southern California: An Island on the Land by Carey McWilliams (1946) (Southern California Country)
- Corn Country by Homer Croy (1947)
- Niagara Country by Lloyd Graham (1949)
- Redwood Country : The Lava Region and the Redwoods by Alfred Powers (1949)
- Wheat Country by William B. Bracke (1950)
- Pittsylvania Country by George Swetnam (1951)
- Gulf Coast Country by Hodding Carter and Anthony Ragusin (1951)
- Smoky Mountain Country by North Callahan (1952)
- Adirondack Country by William Chapman White (1954)
- High Sierra Country by Oscar Lewis (1955)
- Old Kentucky Country by Clark McMeekin (1957)
- The Other Illinois by Baker Brownell (1958)
