= Greater Good Science Center =

Research center

The Greater Good Science Center (GGSC) is a research center located at the University of California, Berkeley.

== Introduction ==
The center was founded by Dacher Keltner in 2001, with a donation from UC Berkeley alumni Thomas and Ruth Hornaday following the death of their daughter from cancer. Based at the University of California, Berkeley, it sponsors scientific research into social and emotional well-being. The center draws upon academic fields such as psychology, sociology, education, economics, and neuroscience in its research. It publishes an online magazine, Greater Good; a podcast, The Science of Happiness; the Greater Good in Action website; and classes and events. The Greater Good Science Center (GGSC) is generally considered a credible source that works to bridge the gap between scientific research and the general public. While its mission is focused on promoting well-being, compassion, and a thriving society, its programs, particularly the "Bridging Differences" initiative, aim to present research on how to reduce political polarization and foster constructive dialogue across the political spectrum.

== Podcasts and print magazine ==
The center produces the podcast The Science of Happiness. Greater Good magazine (ISSN 1553-3239; 2004–2009) was a quarterly magazine published by the center, edited by Dacher Keltner, of the University of California, Berkeley, and journalist Jason Marsh. The magazine highlighted scientific research into the roots of compassion, altruism, and empathy and included stories of compassion in action, providing a bridge between social scientists and parents, educators, community leaders, and policy makers. The magazine was nominated by the Utne Reader as one of the top independent publications in the country.

== Notes ==
- Common Ground Magazine. May 1, 2005 http://www.lime.com/magazines?uri=commongroundmag.com/lime/2005/05/dob0505.htmlml.
- "In good we trust". San Francisco Magazine. June 2009.
- "Social Sciences". Library Journal. November 15, 2008. Archived from the original on June 7, 2011.
- "Cultivating Happiness". San Francisco Chronicle. December 30, 2007.
- Keltner, Dacher; Marsh, Jason (December 1, 2006). "We Are All Bystanders". Greater Good. Archived from the original on February 27, 2010.
- "Forgiveness, Truth and Reconciliation" (PDF). Greater Good. Fall 2004. Archived from the original (PDF) on July 19, 2011.
- Grossman, Dave (Summer 2007). "Hope on the Battlefield". Greater Good. Archived from the original on 2007-11-30.
