= SLATE =

Californian political organization

- Established: 1958
- Dissolved: 1966
- Purpose: student government
- Region served: UC Berkeley campus
- Method: election campaigns
- Remarks: Historical records at: SLATE Archives

SLATE, a pioneer organization of the New Left and precursor of the Free Speech Movement and formative counterculture era, was a campus political party at the University of California, Berkeley from 1958 to 1966.

== Origins ==
The University of California, Berkeley, had a substantial tradition of student political activism ranging from peace agitation in the 1930s to resisting McCarthyism during the loyalty oath controversy of the 1950s. The first stirrings of the Civil Rights Movement in the mid-1950s prompted a challenge by Ralph Shaffer, graduate student representative on the ASUC (Associated Students of the University of California) Senate, to discriminatory practices of fraternities and sororities. The group's ultimate goal, however, was to end the legacy of McCarthyism The group hoped to achieve this goal by calling for abolition of the House Un-American Activities Committee, which was viewed as one of the biggest obstacles to student rights.

In 1957 a campus political party called Toward An Active Student Community (TASC) was organized by Fritjof Thygeson, Rick White and others. It ran candidates in the student government election. Its requirement that candidates be accountable to TASC, based on the British parliamentary system, was fiercely attacked in the Daily Californian (UCB's student newspaper). TASC's candidates ran on a liberal platform, and were substantially defeated. The next semester, Mike Miller, an undergraduate representative on the ASUC Senate, resigned and organized a slate of candidates to run on a platform supporting racial equality, free speech on campus, voluntary ROTC (participation in ROTC was mandatory at the time for freshman and sophomore men), and participation in the National Student Association. They doubled the electorate and received between 35-40% of the vote. Encouraged, the candidates, joined by Thygeson, White, Peter Franck, Marv Sternberg, and Wilson Carey McWilliams, formally established SLATE as a campus political party in February 1958 (the name was not an acronym, but simply stood for a slate of candidates who ran on a common platform. However, when the Daily Californian followed their policy of not printing in all-capitals a name that was not an acronym, SLATE declared its name to be an acronym for "Student League Accused of Trying to Exist".) The university administration approved SLATE as a student organization, but not as a political party.

In the spring of 1959 the first and only SLATE student body president, David Armor, was elected, along with four other representatives, with strong support from graduate students. The university administration quickly responded by announcing that graduate students would no longer be considered members of the Associated Students and thus would be ineligible to vote in the student elections. SLATE continued to contest student elections, raising issues of free speech and academic freedom, as well as the right of students to take positions on such "off-campus" public issues as racial discrimination, capital punishment, civil liberties, war and peace, and farm worker organizing. Over the course of 1959 Berkeley Chancellor Clark Kerr developed a set of directives governing the rights of student organizations to sponsor speakers and prohibiting taking stands on "off-campus" issues. SLATE led the opposition to the Kerr Directives.

SLATE took positions on a number of controversial public issues that emerged in its first years. It supported a Berkeley fair housing ordinance in 1959, opposed the hearings conducted by the House Un-American Activities Committee (HUAC) in San Francisco in May 1960, supported the national Woolworth-Kress boycott called by civil rights organizations, opposed the execution of Caryl Chessman at San Quentin, and opposed continued nuclear weapon testing. SLATE also continued its advocacy for on-campus issues, including an end to compulsory ROTC, elimination of the Communist speaker ban, academic freedom, the rights of student organizations, and an idealistic critique of Kerr's instrumental vision of the modern University. Articulating these positions were Ken Cloke and Michael Tigar, two SLATE representatives elected to the ASUC Senate in the early 1960s.

Almost from his arrival on campus in 1958, Michael Myerson served on SLATE's executive board; in 1961, he became SLATE president.

SLATE served as an umbrella group for students whose politics ranged from Young Democrats to Trotskyist, and never became the exclusive possession of any one political sect or grouping. As Mike Miller put it, SLATE followed a politics of the "lowest significant common denominator," in maintaining a multi-issue student organization committed to democracy, human rights, and peace. As word of students protests at Berkeley spread, campus political parties were organized at a number of American universities, including San Francisco State, Michigan, Iowa, UCLA, Riverside, Chicago, and Illinois.

== Campus ban ==
Public reaction to UC students participating in the demonstrations against HUAC, pickets against discrimination, and vigils against capital punishment was putting pressure on UC Regents and administrators. As SLATE members continued to insist on the right to take stands on "off-campus issues," the university administration responded by banning SLATE from the campus (the ban was later reversed).

Beginning in 1960 and continuing for four years, SLATE sponsored a series of summer conferences. The 1962 SLATE summer conference, "The Negro in America," featured Charles McDew, chairman of the Student Nonviolent Coordinating Committee, and led to the formation of Bay Area Friends of SNCC. The 1963 SLATE summer conference, "Education in the Multiversity," criticized Clark Kerr's vision of the university, the role of universities in the Cold War, and argued for an expanded concept of student rights and academic freedom in university reform. As one of its educational reform projects, in fall 1963 SLATE began publishing The SLATE Supplement to the General Catalog, evaluating campus departments, courses and instructors.

== Impact of the FSM ==
In fall 1964, the issue SLATE had promoted since its founding, the right of student groups to give support to off-campus causes, came to a head over the right of students to place tables at the entrance of the campus to solicit members and contributions for a variety of issues. Leading the defense of these rights were a number of students who had been to Mississippi for Freedom Summer, or were otherwise involved with civil rights protests in the Bay Area. The Free Speech Movement that emerged from the University's attempt to arrest and expel students who led the protests was even broader than SLATE's coalition, as the FSM included Young Republicans and supporters of Barry Goldwater for President in the 1964 election. SLATE members were active in the FSM, but in general were not the leaders. SLATE won five positions on the Associated Students in the fall 1964 election, but failed to take over the student government when it only elected two representatives in Spring 1965, and lost the campaign for student body president as well. SLATE then attempted to draft a new student government constitution, but the proposed document was voted down in a referendum in April 1966. With many students feeling that student government was a hopeless arena for change, SLATE voted to dissolve itself in October 1966. The SLATE Supplement to the General Catalog became part of the student government and continued publishing until 1971.

== Reunions ==
The first reunion, attended by some 150 former SLATE members (out of an estimated 850 one-time dues-paying members), was held at the Berkeley campus in June 1984 with considerable media attention. A survey revealed that most who attended were still active in left-of-center politics, although there were exceptions. David Armor, SLATE's only student body president (who did not attend), had made an unsuccessful run for a Los Angeles Congressional district in 1982 as a Reagan Republican, and Rick White, who did attend, found his neoconservative views treated respectfully but not shared. In an emotional session, SLATE women recalled the sexism they had encountered from male leaders in the organization. Two former SLATE members in attendance had achieved success in California electoral politics: Jackie Goldberg served on the Los Angeles school board and city council (and would later serve in the California Assembly from 2002 to 2006), and Bill Lockyer was then in the midst of his 25 years in California State Legislature, and would go on to serve as Attorney General of California (from 1999 to 2007) and state Treasurer (2007 to 2015). A second SLATE reunion was held in 2000 at a retreat center, and a third half-day reunion was held in conjunction with the 40th anniversary reunion of the FSM in 2004.
