= Conservation and restoration of vinyl discs =

Preservation of gramophone collections

Chemical Exposure Chamber, Southwest Research Institute of San Antonio. Vinyl, acetate, and shellac discs being exposed to soil and fungus spores. Library of Congress Study, 1959.

Conservation and restoration of vinyl discs are the preventive measures taken to defend against damage and slow degradation, and to maintain fidelity of singles, 12" singles, EPs, and LPs in 45 or 33⅓ rpm 10" disc recordings.

Vinyl LP preservation is generally considered separate from conservation, which refers to the repair and stabilization of individual discs. Commonly practiced in major sound archives and research libraries that house large collections of audio recordings, it is also frequently followed by audiophiles and home record collectors.

Because vinyl—a light plastic made up of polyvinyl chloride acetate copolymer, or PVC—is considered the most stable of analog recording media, it is seen as less a concern for deterioration than earlier sound recordings made from more fragile materials such as acetate, vulcanite, or shellac. This hardly means that vinyl recordings are infallible, however, and research—both expert and evidential—has shown that the way in which discs are handled and cared for can have a profound effect on their longevity. Though some 45s (7"s) are also made from vinyl, many of them are actually polystyrene—a more fragile medium that is prone to fracturing from internal stress. Still, many of the recommendations for the care of vinyl LPs can be applied to 45s.

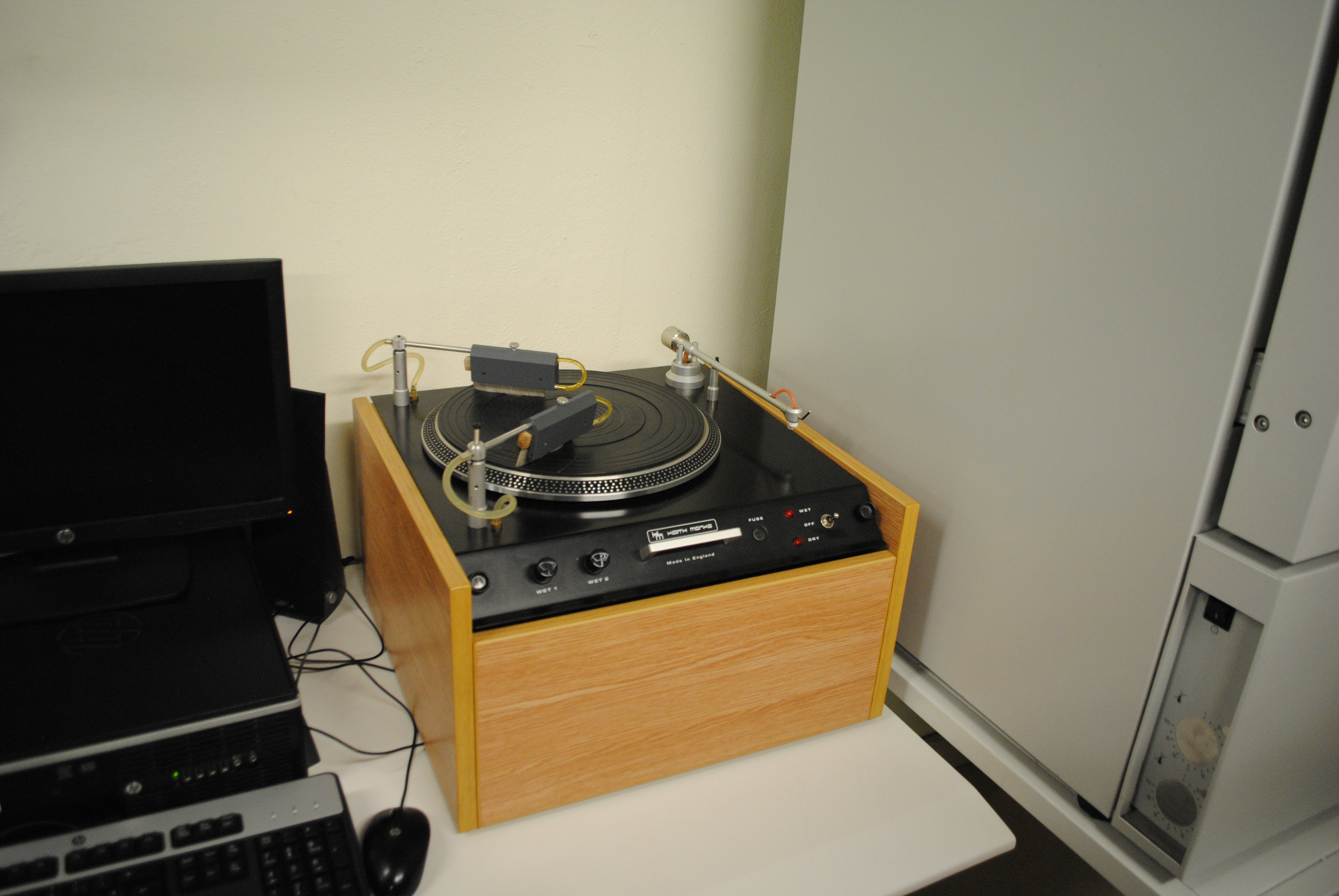
Modern vinyl disc machine cleaning at the Fonoteca Nacional (National Sound Archive of Mexico)

== Historical development and standards ==
In 1959—roughly a decade after vinyl LPs first became widely available to consumers—the Library of Congress published Preservation of Sound Recordings (A.G. Pickett and M.M. Lemcoe), the first and most extensive investigation of the deterioration of grooved discs and magnetic tape. Funded by a grant from the Rockefeller Foundation, the purpose of the investigation was to establish suitable guidelines for the storage and preservation of sound recordings for libraries. Conducted at the Southwest Research Institute of San Antonio, the study involved subjecting sound recordings to a series of lab tests, from accelerated aging to fungal exposure. Though considered the definitive study in the field, the chemical makeup of plastics and how they perform under stress was the primary focus of the report, whereas playback deterioration—a significant concern to sound archivists and record collectors—was excluded from the investigation.

The Preservation and Restoration of Sound Recordings (Jerry McWilliams), published in 1979 by the American Association of State and Local History, did include information about disc wear through playback, and is still a practical source of information on sound recording preservation. A comprehensive manual based on reports gathered from library professionals, sound archivists, audio engineers, and other experts, it included information on such topics as disc damage from frequency of use, stylus wear, and inferior or improperly adjusted equipment.

In 1986 the Association of Recorded Sound Collections (ARSC) Associated Archives (AAA) Committee received a grant from the National Endowment for the Humanities to conduct an in-depth study in order to identify the problems of preservation and access for sound recordings. Their 860-page report, titled Audio Preservation, A Planning Study was published in 1988.

Since the shift from analog to digital recording, research in the preservation of sound recordings has been in serious decline. Gerald L. Gibson, the head of the Motion Picture, Broadcasting, and Recorded Sound Division of the Library of Congress expressed his concern on this issue in 1991, by referencing an investigation on the effects of fire on sound and audiovisual recordings as some of the only new research being done on the topic, stating, "Comparatively little is known about the preservation, conservation, aging problems, or properties of sound recordings…virtually no independent work is going on in these areas." (Gerald L. Gibson, Head of the Motion Picture, Broadcasting, and Recorded Sound Division of the Library of Congress, 1991).

Though guidelines and recommendations for the care, handling, and proper storage of vinyl LPs are available from such resources as The Library of Congress and the National Library of Canada, to this date there are no nationally agreed upon standards for audio preservation. In January 2007, a five-page letter was sent to the National Recording Preservation Board at the Library of Congress on behalf of the Association of Research Libraries (ARL) in support of a study on the current state of recorded sound preservation in the United States, stating "the lack of agreed upon standards and commonly accepted best practices presents a major barrier to effective audio preservation."(Prudence S. Adler, Associate Executive Director and Karla L. Hahn, Director, Office of Scholarly Communication, Association of Research Libraries, Jan. 2007)

== See also ==
- Cylinder Preservation and Digitization Project
- Gramophone record
- LP album
- National Recording Preservation Board
- Phonograph
- Preservation (library and archival science)
- Sound recording and reproduction
- Laser turntable
