= Mia Brownell =

American painter (born 1971)

Mia Brownell (born 1971) is an American painter whose work has been described by the Boston Globe art critic Cate McQuaid as "a 21st-century take on the 17th-century genre, pulled off with thrilling technique -- a postmodern fruit cocktail that marries today's fascination with genetics and the building blocks of life with old-style painterly seduction."

== Biography ==
Mia Brownell was born in 1971 in Chicago, Illinois, to a sculptor, Nancy J. Schulson and a biophysicist, William E. Brownell. Mia began her academic training as a painter at the age of 14 at the Baltimore School for the Arts. She attended Carnegie Mellon University in Pittsburgh and the State University of New York, Buffalo. Her paintings are in several private, corporate, and public art collections including the National Academy of Sciences. In 2014, a traveling 10-year survey of her work accompanied a solo exhibition in New York City titled: "Delightful, Delicious, Disgusting: Paintings by Mia Brownell 2003–2013". The exhibition traveled to museums in New Jersey, Pennsylvania and Connecticut. Dedicated exhibition catalog essays have been written about her work by scholars: Donald Kuspit, Carolyn Korsmeyer, Kenneth Bendiner, Hanneke Grootenboer, and Darra Goldstein.

Brownell is a Professor of Art at Southern Connecticut State University in New Haven. Art critic Donald Kuspit said of Brownell's art at a 2010 exhibition: "Brownell’s nature has been 'modernized' and demystified, in that its genetic and cellular basis have been spelled out scientifically, but it remains mysterious—even absurdly miraculous—for it continues to produce, with patient inevitability, the fruits of life. ... Brownell’s paintings are about the bizarre look nature has when seen from a scientific perspective, that is, reductively understood in scientific terms: They are about the estranging, unnatural effect the scientific conception of nature has on the appreciative perception of it."
