= William E. Brownell =

American biophysicist

William E. Brownell is an American biophysicist who is professor in the Bobby R. Alford Department of Otolaryngology, Head and Neck Surgery, Baylor College of Medicine, Houston, Texas, where he is the head of the Cochlear Biophysics Laboratory and is also the Jake and Nina Kamin Chair. He is a biophysicist who studies the mechanics of mammalian hearing. He has earned a B.S. in Physics, at the University of Chicago in 1968, and a Ph.D., at the University of Chicago in 1973.

== Research interests ==
His research interests include the mechanics of hearing, and the molecular basis of cochlear outer hair cell function. One of his contributions to the field was the observation of electromotility in outer hair cells.

== Personal ==
Brownell is the father of Mia Brownell, a painter and Professor of Art at the Southern Connecticut State University in New Haven.
