= Baker Brownell =

American philosopher

Baker Brownell (December 12, 1887 – April 5, 1965) was an American philosopher.

Brownell was born in St. Charles, Illinois, the fifth of six children of Eugene A. and Esther Burr Baker Brownell. He grew up in St. Charles, where he graduated from St. Charles High School.

== Education ==
Brownell attended five universities: the University of Washington (1906–1907); Northwestern University (1907–1909); Harvard University (1909–1913); University of Tübingen (1912–1913), and Cambridge University, England (1913).

While at Harvard Brownell took classes with Josiah Royce and George Santayana, and met William James, who had already retired from Harvard.

Brownell received a B.A. in philosophy from Northwestern in 1910, after completing his last year of undergraduate work at Harvard. He received an M.A. in philosophy from Harvard in 1911. In 1912–1913, as a recipient of the James Walker Traveling Fellow in Philosophy (awarded by Harvard), he attended Tübingen University in Germany and Cambridge University, where he became acquainted with Bertrand Russell.

== Personal ==
In 1916, Brownell married Helena Maxwell, whom he later divorced.

His second marriage was to Adelaide Howard in 1933; they had one son, Eugene Howard Brownell, who was born on September 9, 1939.

== 1910s ==
During World War I, Brownell served as an enlisted man and officer, first in the United States Army, then the U.S. Navy. (He was in the National Guard between 1916 and 1926.) He served both in the Mexican Border Campaign and World War I. He began writing poetry during this period, which was published in such magazines as Poetry, The Dial, and The New Republic.

Upon his return from Europe in 1913, Brownell worked as a cub reporter for the Chicago Tribune. From 1914–1917 he lived in Emporia, Kansas, where he was an instructor in English at the Kansas State Normal College and edited a journal, Teaching.

From 1919 to 1920, Brownell was an Assistant Professor of English at the University of Idaho. Returning to Chicago in 1920, he worked until 1921 as an editorial writer for the Chicago Daily News.

== 1920s ==
In 1921 Brownell joined the faculty of Northwestern University, where he would spend the duration of his academic career. Initially, he was a lecturer in editorial writing and journalism, but soon began teaching courses in contemporary thought and philosophy.

Brownell’s course in Contemporary Thought, one of the first of its kind in the United States, was intended to help students organize fragments of their educational experience into an intelligible whole. It consisted of weekly lectures by prominent individuals with expertise in natural sciences, biology, psychology, sociology, history, economics, art, religion and philosophy. Brownell believed that the “human community” was breaking down in part because students and others did not understand that life itself was fragmented. By helping students integrate their educational experiences, Brownell believed he was helping to mitigate the demise of the small community.

In 1926, Brownell published The New Universe, which enumerated his beliefs, and in 1929 he edited a twelve volume series entitle Man and His World, which included 60 lectures that had been given in his Contemporary Thought course.

== 1930s ==
In 1933, Brownell published Earth is Enough: An Essay on Religious Realism.

During the 1930s Brownell became acquainted with Arthur E. Morgan, chairman of the Tennessee Valley Authority, and edited Morgan’s book, The Small Community.

From 1936 to 1939 he served as an agricultural advisor to the United States Department of Agriculture. As a supervising editor for Harper & Brothers during the 1940s, he edited several books that were designed to integrate various fields of specialized knowledge.

In addition to his long and distinguished connection with Northwestern, Brownell was also a visiting lecturer at other universities including the University of Kansas City, the University of Chicago, the University of Wisconsin, and the Garrett Biblical Institute.

He traveled extensively. Among his trips were a tour of the Galapagos Islands and an expedition to Cocos Island as the guest of his friend Commander E.F. MacDonald Jr., the Chairman of the Zenith Corporation; a six-month sojourn in the interior of Guatemala; a summer in Tahiti; a trip to Isle Royale, Michigan, as a member of the Isle Royale Archeological Expedition; and various cruises in the Caribbean.

With Frank Lloyd Wright in 1937, he wrote Architecture and Modern Life; and in 1939 he wrote Art in Action, explaining his views about the humanities.

== 1940s and 1950s ==
In 1941, Brownell wrote The Philosopher in Chaos, which was an attempt to make head and tail of the modern world.

From 1944 to 1947, Brownell resided in Montana, where he directed a community service project, the Montana Study, which, though initially financed by the Rockefeller Foundation, was jointly sponsored by the Humanities Division of the Rockefeller Foundation and the University of Montana. The Montana Study entailed a program of teaching and field studies in American culture that emphasized the western region of the United States. Brownell's book, The Human Community, published in 1950, is based upon the Montana Study.

Supported by grants from the Rockefeller Foundation and Northwestern University, Brownell continued his community service work in other areas until 1951. He also served as the first director of the Division of Area Services at Southern Illinois University from 1952 to 1954; and organized Southern Illinois's Department of Community Development, which was initiated to help revitalize many communities in southern Illinois.

Upon his retirement from Northwestern in 1953, Brownell became Emeritus Professor of Philosophy.

After fully retiring from academic and administrative work in 1954, Brownell spent the remaining years of his life in Fairhope, Alabama.

He continued writing, in 1958 publishing The Other Illinois, which was based upon his work at Southern Illinois University.

Baker Brownell died on April 5, 1965.

== Main works ==
- The New Universe (1926)
- Earth Is Enough: An Essay on Religious Realism (1933)
- Architecture and Modern Life, with Frank Lloyd Wright (1937)
- Art Is Action (1939)
- The Philosopher in Chaos (1941)
- Life in Montana (1945)
- The Human Community (1950)
- The College and the Community (1952)
- Life in Southern Illinois, with Jo Ann Eblen (1953)
- The Other Illinois (1958, American Folkways series)

== See also ==
- American philosophy
- List of American philosophers
