= Public Display of Infection =

Studio album by Tijuana Sweetheart
- Released: October 21, 2007
- Genres: Punk rock, alternative rock
- Label: Independent

Tijuana Sweetheart chronology
Public Display of Infection (2007)	Trash Candy (2009)

Public Display of Infection is the debut album by Boston rock band Tijuana Sweetheart (formerly known as VAGIANT Boston), released on October 21, 2007.

A clean version of the song "Fuck the Kells" appears as under the title "FTK" a bonus track in the game Guitar Hero II. The song "Seven" appears as a bonus track in the game Rock Band.

== Track listing ==
1. "Cocktease" – 3:01
2. "Fuck the Kells" – 3:20
3. "Angel of the Morning" – 3:17
4. "Knock Out" – 2:17
5. "Tattooed Women" – 2:46
6. "Manhattan" – 3:12
7. "Seven" – 4:15
8. "Ftk (Safe Edit)" – 3:11
