= Tijuana Sweetheart =

American all-female punk rock band

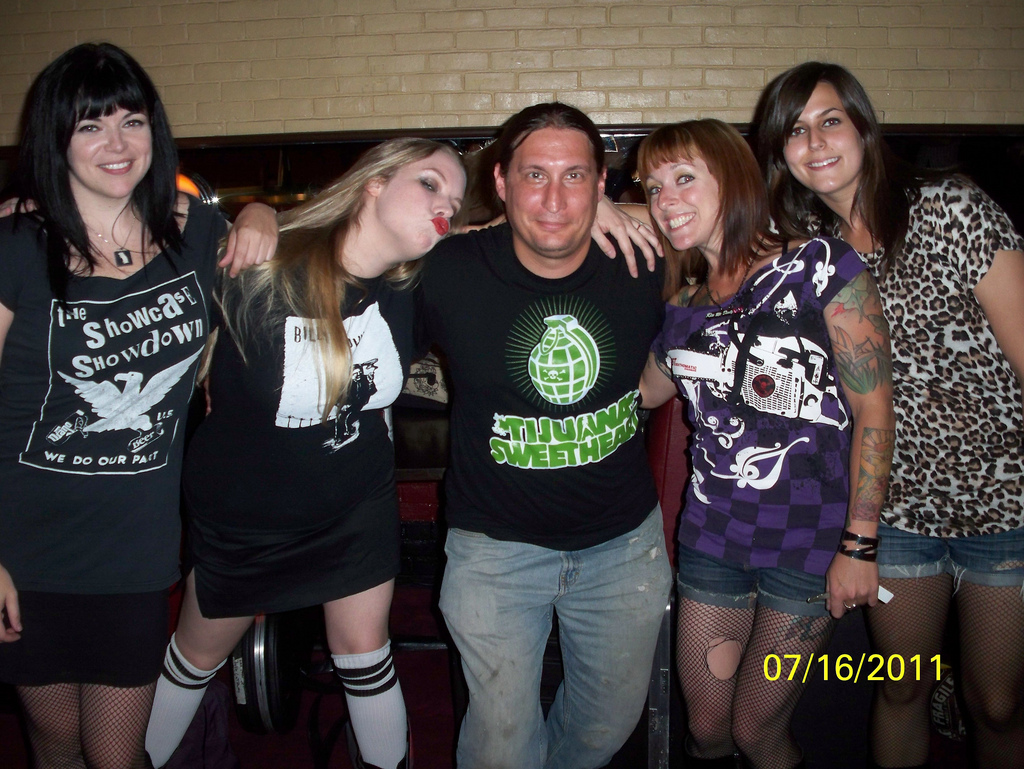

Background information
- Origin: Allston, Massachusetts, United States
- Genres: Punk rock, alternative rock, riot grrrl
- Years active: 2005–2012, 2022
- Past members: Hellion; LoWreck; Julie Two-Times; Keri M. Ivahna Rock; Elena Siegman; Arielle Weiss; Smokey
- Website: www.tijuanasweetheart.com

Tijuana Sweetheart (formerly known as VAGIANT and VAGIANT Boston) was an American all-female punk rock band from Boston, Massachusetts, United States. The band was initially formed in 2005 by four employees of the gaming company Harmonix after Helen McWilliams (stage name Hellion) sent around an email to the entire company. One of these original members was Elena Siegman. Since forming, the band has undergone several member changes leaving McWilliams and LoWreck as the only remaining original members. Most of their recognition has come from the inclusion of "Fuck the Kells" (censored "FTK") in Guitar Hero II, "Seven" in Rock Band, and "Pistol Whipped" in Rock Band 4.

Siegman is more renowned for her contributions to the video game series Call of Duty as the vocalist for songs featured in the Zombies mode in a few games in the franchise.

== Career ==
In October 2009, the band announced it was changing its name from "VAGIANT" to "VAGIANT Boston" due to a legal dispute over the use of the name. It also announced the release of a new album, Trash Candy. Later they asked their fans to help them come up with a new name for the band. After hundreds of often offbeat band name suggestions from fans, the band selected Tijuana Sweetheart in January 2010 – a name that comes from a cocktail of their own invention (and from the band's unique slang term for a prostitute).

Tijuana Sweetheart's music features a fast paced, high energy punk rock base. Stylistically and vocally they are akin to Joan Jett and The Distillers, while lyrically coming off as abrasive and blunt as their sound. Their lyrics are occasionally highly sexual, and often pertain to both genders. Tijuana Sweetheart is a staple band for the Boston area and even features landmarks such as The Kells in their music, and have performed live with such bands as Bang Camaro (also composed of Harmonix staff members), the Mighty Mighty Bosstones, DMZ, and the Ducky Boys.

In 2009 and 2011, they were nominated for the Boston Music Award of Punk Act of the Year.

One of their demo singles, "F**k the Kells" (later released in Public Display of Infection), was featured in Harmonix's rhythm game Guitar Hero II, under the abbreviated title "FTK" due to the game's Teen rating assigned by the ESRB, as a bonus track. A year later, after Harmonix separated from Activision (and left the Guitar Hero license behind), "Seven" off their first album was featured in Rock Band (2007) as a track unlock-able through an alternate campaign.

The song "Trash Candy" from their album of the same name was published for the Rock Band Network on 23 March 2010, and was later played over the end credits of the video game Rock Band 3.

Tijuana Sweetheart competed in the preliminary round of the 2011 WZLX Rock N Roll Rumble held April 4 at TT the Bear's Place in Cambridge.

Tijuana Sweetheart performed its farewell show on June 2, 2012 at O'Briens Pub in Allston, MA.

Their songs "Seven", off Public Display of Infection, "No Mercy" from Trash Candy, and "Pistol Whipped" from their last album release Under the Gun is featured in Rock Band 4 as free downloadable content.

== Band members ==
- Hellion - lead vocals, rhythm guitar
- LoWreck - drums
- Julie Two-Times - bass, backing vocals
- Keri M. - lead guitar, backing vocals

== Past members ==
- Smokey - lead guitar
- Ivahna Rock - bass

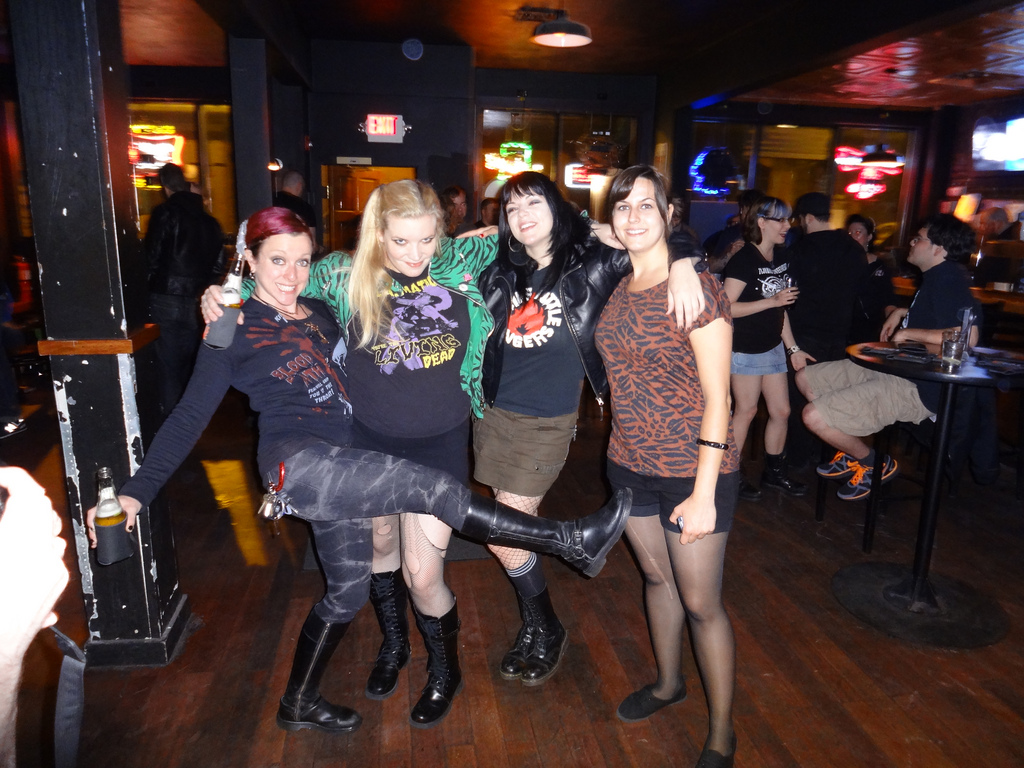
Tijuana Sweetheart at their last show, June 02, 2012

== Discography ==
- Public Display of Infection (2007)
- RITN / Vagiant (Horror Business Records) - Split 7"
- Trash Candy (2009)
- Under the Gun (2012)
