= List of best-selling albums of the 21st century =

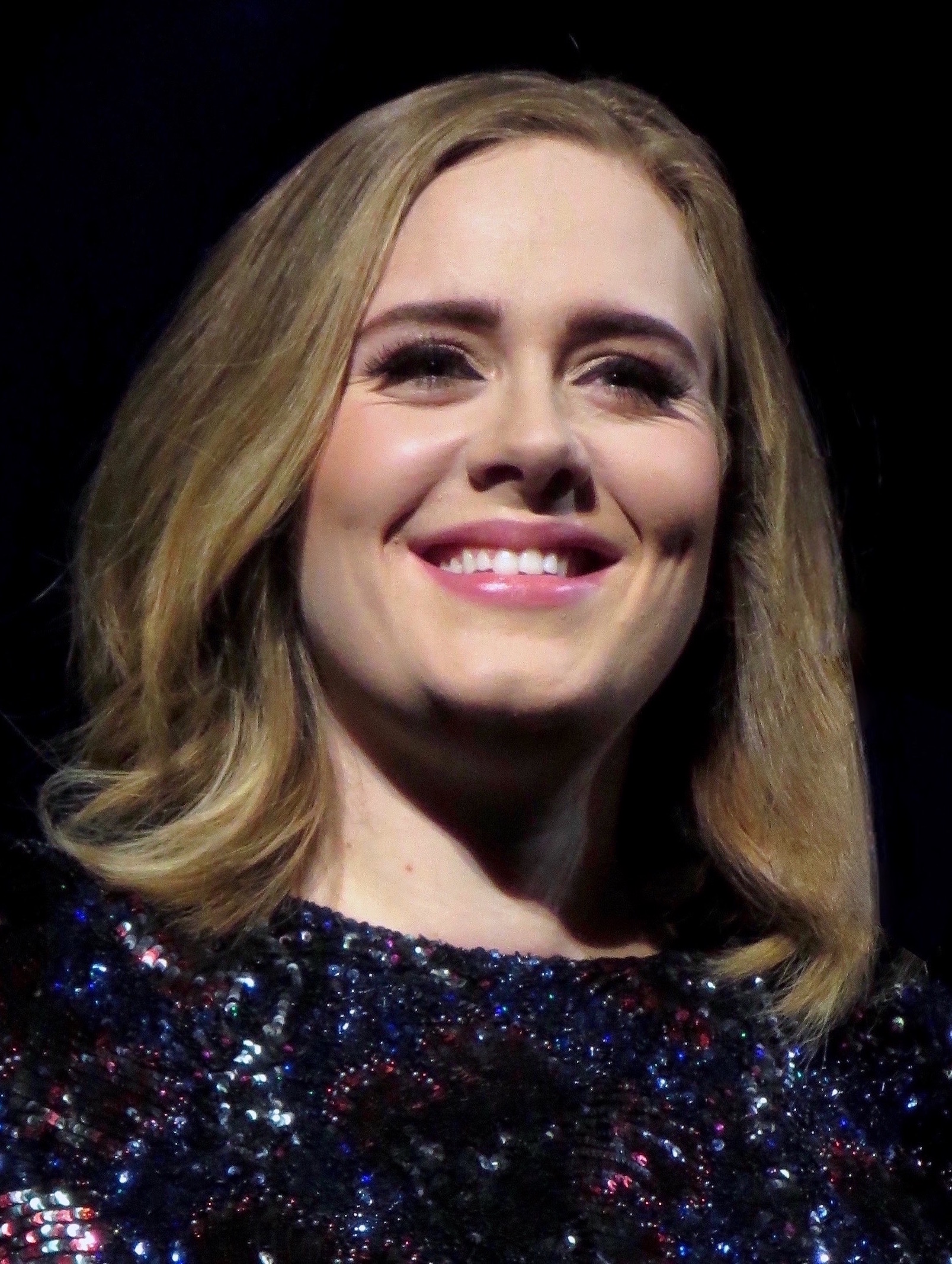
Adele's 21 remains the best-selling album of the 21st century. Her follow-up album 25 ranks as the fourth best-selling album of the century.

This is a list of the best-selling albums of the 21st century to date based on IFPI certification and Nielsen SoundScan sales tracking. The criteria are that the album must have been published (including self-publishing by the artist), and the album must have shipped at least 10 million units starting from January 1, 2001. Units sold include physical copies and digital downloads.

From 2022, IFPI reported three formats of sales chart, newly created Global vinyl album chart, combination of physical copies and digital downloads as Global album sales chart and Global all format chart for totaling of all sales.

== Legend ==
Colors
Studio albums
Greatest hits and compilations
Soundtracks

== 20 million copies or more ==
Release year	Album	Artist/s	Nationality	Worldwide sales (in millions)	Ref.
2011	21	Adele	United Kingdom	31	
2002	Come Away with Me	Norah Jones	United States	27	
2002	The Eminem Show	Eminem	United States	27	
2004	American Idiot	Green Day	United States	23	
2015	25	Adele	United Kingdom	22	
2006	Back to Black	Amy Winehouse	United Kingdom	20	

== 13–19 million copies ==
Release year	Album	Artist/s	Nationality	Worldwide sales (in millions)	Ref.
2003	Fallen	Evanescence	United States	17	
2002	Let Go	Avril Lavigne	Canada	16	
2003	Meteora	Linkin Park	United States	16	
2011	Christmas	Michael Bublé	Canada / Italy	16	
2004	Confessions	Usher	United States	15	
2008	The Fame	Lady Gaga	United States	15	
2014	1989	Taylor Swift	United States	14	
2001	Laundry Service	Shakira	Colombia	13	
2001	Missundaztood	Pink	United States	13	
2008	Viva la Vida or Death and All His Friends	Coldplay	United Kingdom	13	
2005	X&Y	Coldplay	United Kingdom	13	
2005	Curtain Call: The Hits	Eminem	United States	13	

== 10–12 million copies ==
Release year	Album	Artist/s	Nationality	Worldwide sales (in millions)	Ref.
2001	Songs in A Minor	Alicia Keys	United States	12	
2002	A New Day Has Come	Celine Dion	Canada	12	
2002	Stripped	Christina Aguilera	United States	12	
2003	Get Rich or Die Tryin'	50 Cent	United States	12	
2003	Life for Rent	Dido	United Kingdom	12	
2004	Feels like Home	Norah Jones	United States	12	
2004	Breakaway	Kelly Clarkson	United States	12	
2008	Fearless	Taylor Swift	United States	12	
2012	Teenage Dream	Katy Perry	United States	12	
2003	Dangerously in Love	Beyoncé	United States	11	
2004	Back to Bedlam	James Blunt	United Kingdom	11	
2004	Encore	Eminem	United States	11	
2005	All the Right Reasons	Nickelback	Canada	11	
2009	The E.N.D.	Black Eyed Peas	United States	11	
2005	The Emancipation of Mimi	Mariah Carey	United States	10	
2001	Survivor	Destiny's Child	United States	10	
2006	Loose	Nelly Furtado	Canada	10	
2005	Confessions on a Dance Floor	Madonna	United States	10	
2004	Under My Skin	Avril Lavigne	Canada	10	
2001	Silver Side Up	Nickelback	Canada	10	
2001	Britney	Britney Spears	United States	10	
2002	Songs About Jane	Maroon 5	United States	10	
2002	Justified	Justin Timberlake	United States	10	
2003	Number Ones	Michael Jackson	United States	10	
2006	FutureSex/LoveSounds	Justin Timberlake	United States	10	
2008	I Am... Sasha Fierce	Beyoncé	United States	10	
2009	I Dreamed a Dream	Susan Boyle	United Kingdom	10	
2010	Recovery	Eminem	United States	10	
2013	Frozen	Various Artists	—	10	
2014	X	Ed Sheeran	United Kingdom	10	

== See also ==
- List of best-selling albums
- List of best-selling albums in the United States
- List of best-selling albums by country
- List of best-selling music artists
- List of best-selling singles
- List of best-selling albums in the United States of the Nielsen SoundScan era
- List of best-selling albums by year in the United States
- List of best-selling Latin albums in the United States
- IFPI Global Recording Artist of the Year
