= List of Diamond-certified albums in Canada =

List of musical albums selling over 1 million copies in Canada

The following Diamond-certified albums in Canada have sold at least one million units (individual CDs, tapes or LPs) as determined by Canadian Recording Industry Association, the national music recording sales certification agency.

The first million-selling album in Canada was declared in May 1978 as Rumours by the British-American band Fleetwood Mac. Michael Jackson's "Thriller" album is the first in Canada to achieve both double and triple Diamond certification.

== Diamond albums ==
The following albums have sold at least one million units within Canada. This certification has been attained by 18 Canadian albums, representing 11 artists and a compilation album. The Canadian singer Celine Dion holds the record for the most Diamond albums with six in Canada.

Artist	Album	Date certified
Bee Gees/Various artists	Saturday Night Fever	June 1978
Various artists	Grease	November 1978
Supertramp	Breakfast in America	October 1979
Supertramp	Crime of the Century	November 1979
Kenny Rogers	Greatest Hits	June 1981
Led Zeppelin	Led Zeppelin	December 1982
Culture Club	Colour by Numbers	May 1984
Lionel Richie	Can't Slow Down	November 1984
Bruce Springsteen	Born in the U.S.A.	July 1985
Bryan Adams	Reckless	December 1985
Corey Hart	Boy in the Box	February 1986
Dire Straits	Brothers in Arms	April 1986
Phil Collins	No Jacket Required	April 1986
Whitney Houston	Whitney Houston	March 1987
Madonna	True Blue	June 1987
Bon Jovi	Slippery When Wet	October 1987
U2	The Joshua Tree	October 1987
The Eagles	Hotel California	January 1988
Various artists	Dirty Dancing	August 1988
Huey Lewis and the News	Sports	August 1988
Elton John	Greatest Hits Vol. 1	October 1988
Def Leppard	Hysteria	November 1988
AC/DC	Back in Black	October 1989
Milli Vanilli	Girl You Know It's True	March 1990
Alannah Myles	Alannah Myles	December 1990
New Kids on the Block	Hangin' Tough	February 1991
George Michael	Faith	October 1991
INXS	Kick	November 1991
Various artists	Cocktail	January 1992
Bryan Adams	Waking Up the Neighbours	June 1992
ZZ Top	Eliminator	June 1992
Guns N' Roses	Appetite for Destruction	July 1992
Madonna	Like a Virgin	July 1992
Eric Clapton	Unplugged	August 1993
Whitney Houston/Various artists	The Bodyguard	September 1993
Celine Dion	The Colour of My Love	November 1994
The Beatles	Abbey Road	March 1995
The Beatles	1962–1966	March 1995
The Beatles	1967–1970	March 1995
Ace of Base	The Sign	March 1995
Billy Ray Cyrus	Some Gave All	May 1995
Various artists	The Lion King	May 1995
Aerosmith	Get a Grip	June 1995
Garth Brooks	The Hits	July 1995
Various artists	Forrest Gump	August 1995
Tom Cochrane	Mad Mad World	September 1995
Green Day	Dookie	November 1995
Hootie and the Blowfish	Cracked Rear View	March 1996
Various artists	Oh What a Feeling: A Vital Collection of Canadian Music	May 1996
The Smashing Pumpkins	Mellon Collie and the Infinite Sadness	August 1996
Phil Collins	Face Value	November 1996
Celine Dion	Falling into You	November 1996
Boston	Boston	May 1997
No Doubt	Tragic Kingdom	August 1997
Celine Dion	Let's Talk About Love	November 1997
Various artists	Titanic	March 1998
Various artists	Big Shiny Tunes 2	March 1998
Backstreet Boys	Backstreet Boys	May 1998
Backstreet Boys	Backstreet's Back	May 1998
Spice Girls	Spice	July 1998
Celine Dion	Celine Dion	July 1998
Aqua	Aquarium	August 1998
Metallica	Metallica	August 1998
Savage Garden	Savage Garden	September 1998
Sarah McLachlan	Surfacing	October 1998
Spice Girls	Spiceworld	October 1998
The Tragically Hip	Up to Here	January 1999
Andrea Bocelli	Romanza	March 1999
Backstreet Boys	Millennium	October 1999
Britney Spears	...Baby One More Time	December 1999
Ricky Martin	Ricky Martin	December 1999
Amanda Marshall	Amanda Marshall	April 2000
ABBA	ABBA Gold: Greatest Hits	May 2000
Santana	Supernatural	July 2000
Barenaked Ladies	Gordon	September 2000
Bon Jovi	Cross Road: Greatest Hits	November 2000
U2	Achtung Baby	December 2000
The Beatles	1	February 2001
Our Lady Peace	Clumsy	February 2001
Guns N' Roses	Use Your Illusion I	March 2001
Nirvana	Nevermind	March 2001
Avril Lavigne	Let Go	May 2003
Steve Miller Band	Greatest Hits (1974–1978)	August 2003
Eminem	The Eminem Show	September 2003
Norah Jones	Come Away with Me	January 2007
The Tragically Hip	Fully Completely	January 2007
Celine Dion	These Are Special Times	October 2007
Celine Dion	All the Way… A Decade of Song	October 2007
The Beatles	The Beatles Stereo Box Set	April 2010
Michael Bublé	Christmas	December 2014
Adele	25	January 2016
The Tragically Hip	Road Apples	April 2017
Ed Sheeran	X	October 2021
Ed Sheeran	÷	October 2021
The Tragically Hip	Yer Favourites	April 2023
Katy Perry	Teenage Dream	May 2023
Shania Twain	Greatest Hits	September 2023
*N SYNC	No Strings Attached	September 2023
Green Day	American Idiot	October 2023
Lady Gaga	The Fame Monster	February 2024
Various artists	Guardians of the Galaxy: Awesome Mix Vol. 1	October 2024
Michael Jackson	Bad	January 2025
Bruno Mars	Doo-Wops & Hooligans	April 2025
Ed Sheeran	+−=÷× (Tour Collection)	January 2026

== Double Diamond albums ==
Double diamond awards are issued to albums that have sold two million units, representing the highest-selling music albums in Canadian history. Only two Canadian artists, Alanis Morissette and Shania Twain, have attained this level of certification; Twain and Pink Floyd are the only two artists to have reached it with more than one album.

Artist	Album	Date certified
Michael Jackson	Thriller	1984-04-01
Eagles	Their Greatest Hits (1971–1975)	1987-07-30
Fleetwood Mac	Rumours	1995-06-27
Led Zeppelin	Led Zeppelin IV	1995-06-28
Meat Loaf	Bat Out of Hell	1995-08-31
Pink Floyd	The Wall	1995-08-31
Alanis Morissette	Jagged Little Pill	1996-11-12
Shania Twain	The Woman in Me	1999-04-09
Shania Twain	Come on Over	2000-01-21
Pink Floyd	The Dark Side of the Moon	2003-03-14
Shania Twain	Up!	2004-12-21
Adele	21	2018-09-20

== See also ==
- The Top 100 Canadian Albums
- List of best-selling albums in Canada
- List of number-one singles in Canada
