= 21 (Adele album) =

Studio album by Adele
- Released: 24 January 2011
- Recorded: May 2009 – October 2010
- Studios: AIR, Angel, Eastcote, Metropolis, Myaudiotonic, Sphere, and Wendyhouse in London; Harmony and Serenity Sound in Hollywood, California; Patriot in Denver, Colorado; Shangri-La in Malibu, California; Germano Studios (The Hit Factory)
- Genres: Pop; soul; R&B
- Length: 48:01
- Labels: XL; Columbia
- Producers: Adele Adkins; Jim Abbiss; Paul Epworth; Rick Rubin; Fraser T Smith; Ryan Tedder; Dan Wilson

Adele chronology
19 (2008)	21 (2011)	iTunes Festival: London 2011 (2011)

Singles from 21
- 1. "Rolling in the Deep" Released: 29 November 2010; 2. "Someone like You" Released: 24 January 2011; 3. "Set Fire to the Rain" Released: 4 July 2011; 4. "Rumour Has It" Released: 5 November 2011; 5. "Turning Tables" Released: 5 November 2011

21 is the second studio album by the English singer-songwriter Adele. It was released on 24 January 2011 in Europe by XL Recordings and on 22 February 2011 in North America by Columbia Records. The album was named after the age of the singer during its production. 21 shares the Motown and soul influences of her 2008 debut album 19, but also draws influence from the American country and Southern blues music that Adele started listening to during the North American leg of her tour An Evening with Adele. Composed in the aftermath of the singer's separation from her then partner, the album explores themes of heartbreak, healing, introspection, and forgiveness.

Adele began writing 21 in April 2009, while still involved in the relationship that subsequently inspired the record. Looking to deviate from the brooding sound of her first album, she had intended to compose a more upbeat and contemporary follow-up. However, studio sessions ended prematurely due to a lack of inspiration. She resumed production immediately after the breakdown of her relationship, channelling her heartbreak and depression into her songs. Adele collaborated with various songwriters and producers, including Columbia Records co-president at the time Rick Rubin, Paul Epworth, Ryan Tedder, Jim Abbiss, and Dan Wilson.

21 defied the modest commercial expectations of her independent record label, XL. It topped record charts in more than 30 countries and became the world's best-selling album of the year for both 2011 and 2012, helping to revitalise the lagging sales of the global music industry. In the United Kingdom, 21 is the best-selling album by a solo artist, best-selling album of the 21st century, and the third best-selling album overall, while its 23-week tenure atop the UK Albums Chart is the longest by a female solo artist. In the United States, it is the best-performing Billboard 200 album of all time, holding the top position for 24 weeks, longer than any other album since 1985 and the longest by a female solo artist in Billboard 200 history. It was certified Diamond by the Recording Industry Association of America (RIAA), denoting sales of over 10 million copies in the US. In addition, three of the five singles released in its promotion – "Rolling in the Deep", "Someone like You", and "Set Fire to the Rain" – became international number-one songs, while "Rumour Has It" charted in the top 20 in countries across Europe and North America. With sales of over 31 million pure copies worldwide, 21 is the best-selling album of the 21st century and one of the best-selling albums of all time.

Praised for its understated production, vintage aesthetic, and Adele's vocal performance, 21 was shortlisted for the 2011 Mercury Prize, and won the 2012 Grammy Award for Album of the Year and the Brit Award for British Album of the Year. It has since been ranked amongst Rolling Stone's 500 Greatest Albums of All Time and is included in the book 1001 Albums You Must Hear Before You Die.

== Writing and production ==
=== Early writing sessions ===
In April 2009, 20-year-old Adele, who had recently embarked on her first serious relationship with a man 10 years her senior, began composing the follow-up to her 2008 debut album 19. In response to the media's typecasting her as an "old soul" due to the vintage production and sentimental nature of her songs, Adele decided on a more upbeat and contemporary second album. However, studio sessions were generally unproductive, and after two weeks, yielded only one song recorded to the singer's satisfaction—the Jim Abbiss-produced "Take It All," a lovelorn piano ballad not unlike the songs on 19. Disillusioned with lack of inspiration and the slow progress of the studio sessions, she cancelled the remaining recording session dates.

Adele had written "Take It All" during a difficult moment in her 18-month relationship, which ended shortly after she first played this song for her boyfriend. Heartbroken but musically stimulated, Adele channelled her rush of emotions into her music, crafting songs that examined her failed relationship from the perspectives of a vengeful ex-lover, a heartbroken victim, and a nostalgic old flame.

=== Sessions with Epworth, Smith, and Tedder ===
Writing for the album began shortly after Adele separated from her lover. Within a day of her break-up, she contacted producer Paul Epworth, intent on capturing her emotion in a song: "We'd had a fuming argument the night before, I'd been bubbling. Then I went into the studio and screamed." Although she had initially planned on completing a ballad that she had begun writing with Epworth more than a year ago, the producer suggested that she aim for a more aggressive sound. Together, they restructured the song and rewrote lyrics to reflect Adele's recent experience, deciding on the title "Rolling in the Deep." The instrumentation evolved organically—after trying out various jazz riffs, Adele attempted the first verse a cappella, inspiring Epworth to improvise a melody on his acoustic guitar. A thumping drum beat was set to mimic her racing heartbeat. In two days, a demo was recorded to be produced by Columbia Records co-president Rick Rubin later that year. However, Adele re-approached Epworth months later to complete production of the song.

British producer Fraser T Smith recalled following a similar trajectory when he teamed up with Adele to compose the subsequent third single "Set Fire to the Rain" at his MyAudiotonic Studios in London. After the two had created the demo, Adele revisited her co-writer to record the song with him, instead of the intended producer Rick Rubin. Smith thought Adele's first attempt superior to subsequent takes and used the demo as the final production of the song, complete with live drum sounds and an elaborate strings section (arranged by British musician Rosie Danvers).

With the demos of two songs recorded, Adele approached American musician and OneRepublic frontman Ryan Tedder, who was in London at the time for a radio show. Tedder had expressed interest in collaborating with the singer after they met at the 2009 Grammy Awards ceremony in February. He arrived four hours early to their first studio session, buying time to better familiarise himself with some of her previous work. Although unaware of Adele's personal predicament, he composed the opening piano sequence and the first few lines of what became the lovelorn ballad "Turning Tables": "Close enough to start a war/All that I have is on the floor." Coincidentally, it perfectly captured the experience of the singer, who arrived at the studio moments after another altercation with her former lover. Angry and unfocused, she denounced her ex-lover's tendency to "turn the tables" on her during their arguments, an expression that Tedder decided to reference in the song's lyrics. Adele recorded the demo with Jim Abbiss the following day.

Adele and Tedder arranged a second meeting and reconvened at Serenity West Studios in Los Angeles weeks later to write and record "Rumour Has It". In an interview, Tedder recalled his astonishment at the singer's musicality and vocal prowess after she completed the main vocals to the song in 10 minutes: "She sang it once top to bottom, pitch perfect, she didn't miss a note. I looked at the engineer then at her and said, 'Adele, I don't know what to tell you but I have never had anyone do that in ten years'."

=== Sessions with Rubin, Wells, and Wilson ===
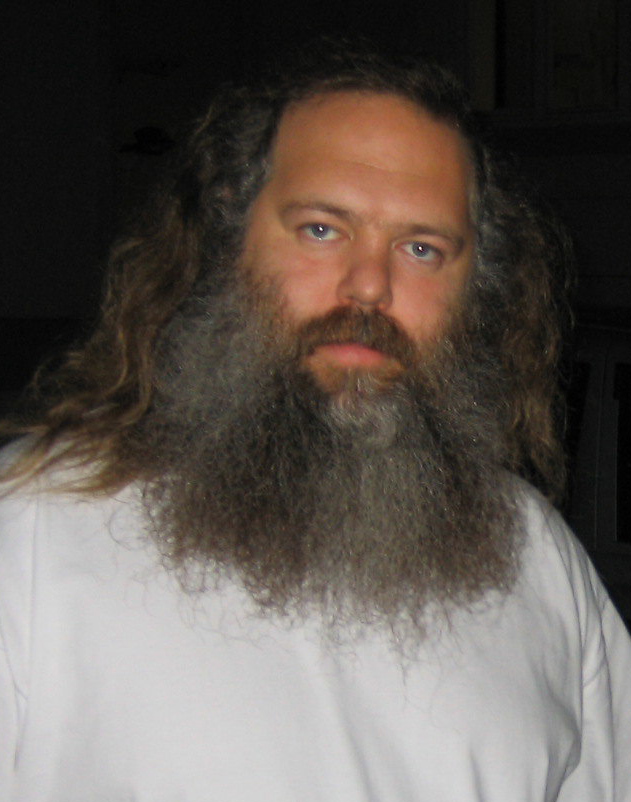
Columbia Records co-president Rick Rubin, known for his "stripped-down" sound and unorthodox approach in the studio, was one of the major producers for the album.

After working with Smith, Tedder, and Epworth, Adele travelled to the United States for the remainder of the album's production. At the suggestion of Columbia Records group president Ashley Newton, she met with songwriter Greg Wells at his studio in Culver City, Los Angeles, where they co-wrote the gospel-tinged ballad "One and Only". The song evolved from a four-chord piano progression in a 6/8-metre, which Wells had conceived before meeting with the singer. The lyrics, aimed at the singer's new love interest, came together quickly and were later completed with Dan Wilson, with whom she also composed "Someone like You". In 2008, Adele's appearance on the NBC sketch comedy show Saturday Night Live caught the attention of producer Rick Rubin. In the initial stage of the album's production, Rubin had signed on as its sole producer and was scheduled to produce all of its songs. The demos she had recorded with Epworth, Smith, and Tedder (including "Rolling in the Deep" and "Set Fire to the Rain") were subsequently rerecorded by Rubin when she met with him in his Shangri-La Studio in Malibu, California, in April 2010.

Rubin, notorious for his unorthodox production style, pushed the singer beyond her comfort zone, and despite being drawn to his unconventional methods, Adele described working with the producer as daunting. Rubin had attended many of her shows throughout 2008–2009, and after a Hollywood Bowl performance, approached her to compliment her live sound. When they met in Malibu, he attempted to "capture her live show across on [her] record," assembling a team of musicians—including drummer Chris Dave, guitarist Matt Sweeney, James Poyser on piano, and Pino Palladino on bass—to contribute live instrumentation to the recording sessions. He also decided against the use of music samples and electronic instruments. An advocate of a more free-form approach to music-making, Rubin relied on the moods and feelings behind the music itself to guide the instrumental and melodic arrangement of the songs. He isolated the singer in the studio and encouraged her, as well as his team of musicians, to approach the production process with more spontaneity and less restraint. The singer even recalled moving the musicians and production team to tears while recording some of the songs. In an interview, he commented on the nature of the recording sessions:

Her singing was so strong and heartbreaking in the studio, it was clear something very special was happening ... The musicians were inspired as they rarely get to play with the artist present, much less singing ... Today, most things are recorded as overdubs on track. This was truly an interactive moment where none of the musicians knew exactly what they were going to play and all were listening so, so, deeply and completely to figure out where they fitted in ... all of the playing was keying off the emotion on Adele's outrageous vocal performance.

After recording the album with Rubin, Adele was dissatisfied with many of the songs. Ultimately, she decided to scrap most of the work done in favour of the early takes she did with other producers, including Epworth and Tedder, for the music to reflect the raw emotion felt immediately after her break-up. From her collaboration with Rubin, only five songs appeared on the album: "Don't You Remember," "He Won't Go," "I'll Be Waiting," "One and Only," as well as the U.S.-only track "I Found a Boy." Weeks after her stint with Rubin, Adele learned of her ex-lover's recent engagement, inspiring the composition of the album's final track "Someone like You." Adele's record label was initially dissatisfied with the song's sparse production, which comprised Adele's voice alongside a sole piano, and requested that it be re-recorded with Rubin's band. However, the singer opted to keep the arrangement, stating that the song was personal to her and that she wrote it to "free herself."

=== Titling ===
[21]'s different from 19, it's about the same things but in a different light. I deal with things differently now. I'm more patient ... more forgiving and more aware of my own flaws ... Something that comes with age I think. So fittingly this record is called 21 ... Like a photo album you see [my] progression and change ... throughout the years. I tried to think of other album titles but couldn't come up with anything that represented the album properly.

— Adele, on the meaning behind the title.

Adele first intended to title the album Rolling in the Deep, her adaptation of the slang phrase "roll deep," which summarises how she felt about her relationship; in her loose translation, the phrase refers to having someone "that has your back" and always supports you. However, the singer later deemed the title too confusing for some of her audiences. Although she had wanted to avoid the number motif of her debut, Adele considered "21" the most fitting title as it represented her age at the time of the album's composition, serving as an autobiographical period piece and symbolising the personal maturity and artistic evolution since her debut.

== Music and influence ==
21 is a primarily pop, soul, and traditional R&B album. J.D. of Rolling Stone said that Adele "created a burnished R&B sound that harks back to Sixties soul and mid-20th century jazz yet felt utterly present in our own moment". Music critic Carl Wilson wrote that on 21, she was an "R&B belter aiming to represent a more 'organic' presence on the charts for those who hear beat-driven pop as too plastic". As on her previous album, Adele used "the high emotional technology of classic R&B", Wilson said.

21 bears influences of Adele's extended exposure to the music of the Southern United States during the North American leg of her 2008–2009 tour An Evening with Adele. Frequent smoke breaks with her tour bus driver, a Nashville, Tennessee native, resulted in her introduction to bluegrass and rockabilly, and the music of Garth Brooks, Wanda Jackson, Alison Krauss, Lady Antebellum, Dolly Parton, and Rascal Flatts. Adele developed an appreciation for the country genre, praising what she described as the immediacy of the themes and the straightforward narrative structure of many of the songs she listened to.

She also expressed her enthusiasm for simply learning a new musical style. Although influenced by Adele's interest in country music at the time, 21 remains faithful to the Motown influences of 19 and exhibits both gospel and soul music inflexions. Instruments such as the saxophone, harp, banjo, and accordion contributed to its exploration of blues and soul. The singer drew from the music of Mary J. Blige, Kanye West, Elbow, Mos Def, Alanis Morissette, Tom Waits, and Sinéad O'Connor in the cultivation of the album's sound and credited Yvonne Fair, Andrew Bird, Neko Case, and The Steel Drivers with its musical direction.

Adele's style on 21 is generally characterised by critics as soul, although some suggest that the album eschews any distinct stylistic epithet. John Murphy of musicOMH characterises the album as British soul. Jon Caramanica of The New York Times wrote that the album's music is a part of a recent British soul revival that "summoned styles dating back to Motown girl groups and Dusty Springfield". Ryan Reed of Paste calls Adele a "British alt-soul prodigy" and the album's music "the stuff of sensual modern pop-noir landscape, heavy on retro textures and relationship drama". Danyel Smith of Billboard views that Adele's music exhibits influences from Northern soul, Aretha Franklin, Sade, and Bette Midler.

Larry Flick of SiriusXM called 21 "a pop record with soul leanings", while The Washington Post's Allion Stewart commented on the album's eclectic nature: "Everything on [21] is precisely calibrated to transcend genres, to withstand trends ... It's slightly angled toward country, even more toward R&B", and "informed, but never overwhelmed, by roots music". Mike Spies of Slate argues that soul music is inextricably linked to the political, historical, and cultural experience of African Americans, and that Adele and her contemporaries, far removed from this socio-cultural milieu, can offer only a mere duplicate of actual "soul", despite a capacity to convincingly channel the sound. Randall Roberts of the Los Angeles Times wrote that 21 is an "ode to, American soul, rhythm and blues, jazz, country and the myriad combinations thereof".

== Songs ==
The sequence of the tracks on the deeply autobiographical album correlates with the range of emotions Adele experienced after the break-up, progressing from themes of anger and bitterness to feelings of loneliness, heartbreak, and regret, and finally, acceptance. The revenge song "Rolling in the Deep," a "dark, bluesy, gospel, disco tune" in the singer's own words, was written as a "fuck you" to her ex-lover after his disparaging remarks that she was weak and that her life without him would be "boring and lonely and rubbish." Opening with an understated acoustic guitar strum, the song's first lines set the foreboding tone of the album. Pounding martial beats, shuffling percussion, and piano coalesce into a dramatic, multilayered chorus over which "Adele's voice ranges, dramatizing her search for just the right tone and words to express her dismay that a man would dare break her heart." The first single from 21, "Rolling in the Deep," is one of the more apparent influences of the bluesy Americana music that framed the album's sound.

"Rumour Has It," the singer's tongue-in-cheek retort to the hurtful gossip that surrounded her break-up, was aimed at her own friends for their part in spreading these rumours. Fusing elements of doo-wop and Tin Pan Alley blues, the percussion-driven song is built on girl-group harmonies, piano chords, pounding kick drum, and handclaps, and finds the singer "channeling a '40s, piano-vixen lounge singer." Jon Caramanica of The New York Times pointed out the song's "hollow counterpoint vocals" and slow, "daringly morbid" bridge that veers from the pounding rhythm before once again acceding to it. In the studio, Tedder experimented with a riff inspired by Radiohead's "I Might Be Wrong," crediting the song's drop D tuning and American blues vibe as impetus for "Rumour Has It." In "Turning Tables," a song of domestic dispute, its narrator assumes a defensive stance against a manipulative ex-lover. Reconciling herself with the termination of a contentious relationship, she vows emotional distance to shield herself from future heartbreak. Bryan Boyd of The Irish Times likened the singer to 1980s Welsh rocker Bonnie Tyler in delivering the vocals with a mixture of anger, pain, and pathos. According to Paste magazine, cinematic strings "serve as fitting counterpoint to [the song's] heartbroken, hollowed-out lyrics."

'Rolling in the Deep'
The revenge song "Rolling in the Deep" was conceived only hours after Adele's separation from her ex-lover. A "dark, bluesy, gospel, disco tune" in the singer's own words, it was written in response to disparaging comments he made towards her during an argument.

"Someone like You"
A 27-second sample of "Someone like You" which features spare and understated production. In the song, Adele wishes her former lover happiness in his new relationship and begs him never to forget her.

"Don't You Remember"
On "Don't You Remember," the singer implores her ex-lover to overlook her past mistakes and to remember her at her best. With bluesy guitar riffs and instrumental backing from the banjo and the accordion, the Rick Rubin-produced song is one of the more potent examples of the country music influences that permeate the album.

The Rick Rubin-produced fourth track "Don't You Remember," co-written by Adele and Dan Wilson, marks a shift in the album's theme, from anger and defensiveness to reflection and heartbreak. A downtempo country music-styled ballad, the song was added late to the production of the album after the singer grew ashamed of her continued negative portrayal of her ex-lover throughout the album. Its lyrics entreat a past lover to remember the happier moments at the beginning of a now broken relationship. "Don't You Remember" was the most challenging song on 21 for Adele to record. In "Set Fire to the Rain," the singer delineates the conflicting stages of a troubled union and wrestles with her inability to fully let go. Accentuated by ornate orchestral flourishes, swirling strings, crescendos, and dramatic vocal effects towards its climactic end, the song stands in stark contrast to the otherwise understated production of the album and, in reviews, was characterised by critics as a pop rock power ballad. To achieve a fuller sound, producer Fraser T Smith incorporated the popular "wall of sound" reverberative technique in framing the song's dense instrumentation.

"Take It All," the seventh track, written and recorded with Francis "Eg" White and Jim Abbiss before the breakdown of Adele's relationship, is a piano and vocal ballad that borrows heavily from pop, soul, and gospel. In his review of 21, Allmusic's Matt Collar called the song the album's centrepiece, "an instant classic" in the same vein as "And I Am Telling You I'm Not Going" and "All by Myself," a "cathartic moment for fans who identify with their idol's Pyrrhic lovelorn persona." The track precedes "I'll Be Waiting," the second of two songs produced by Epworth, which diverges from the scathing "Rolling in the Deep" in its optimistic tone and brisk, lilted melody. A protagonist's mea culpa for a relationship gone wrong, she declares to wait patiently for her lover's inevitable return. The song was compared to the work of Aretha Franklin for its "huge vocal sound on the chorus, rolling piano, and boxy snare," while Tom Townshend of MSN Music described its brass section as a Rolling Stones-esque "barroom gospel."

Although the album predominantly explores the singer's failed relationship, not all songs were geared towards her ex-lover. "He Won't Go," a nod to hip-hop and contemporary R&B, was a tribute to a friend who battled heroin addiction. The ninth track "One and Only," noted for its gospel-tinged vocals, organ, and choir, was directed at a close friend for whom Adele shared romantic feelings. And "Lovesong" (a cover of a song by the Cure) was dedicated to Adele's mother and friends, in whom she found solace when she grew homesick and lonely while recording in Malibu.

The album closes with the "heartbreak Adagio" "Someone like You," a soft piano ballad that pairs Adele's vocals with a piano playing mostly an arpeggiated ostinato. In interviews, the singer described it as the summation of her attitude towards her ex-lover by the end of the album's production. The song's lyrics describe a protagonist's attempt at dealing with her heartbreak after she learns of her ex-lover's recent marriage and happy new life. Sean Fennessey of The Village Voice praised the singer's nuanced vocal performance in the song, which ascends "into a near-shrieked whisper" during parts of the chorus, after which she once again regains composure. One of the more commended songs on the album, "Someone like You" was praised for its lyrical depth and understated simplicity.

== Release and promotion ==
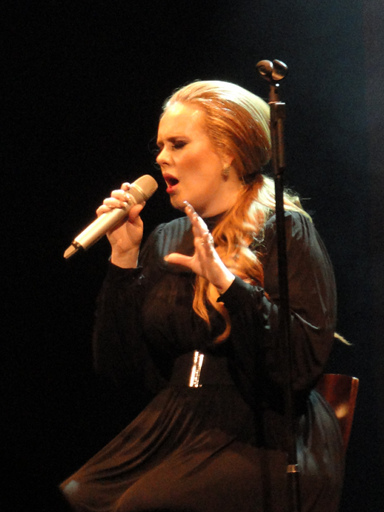
Adele performing "Someone like You" in 2011 during a concert in Seattle, Washington.

For the North American release of 21 on 22 February, Columbia Records executives employed the "'long tail' sales theory" to shape its marketing campaign, which, according to Columbia Senior VP of Marketing Scott Greer, involved "building a critical mass throughout February to reach all those people who bought 19." A key part of this strategy was the record company approaching internet and media partners Vevo, AOL, and VH1 to commence the promotion of Adele's old and new songs. In the months leading up to the European release of 21, Adele embarked on a promotional tour across Europe, performing on the UK's Royal Variety Performance on 9 December 2010, the finale of the reality singing competition The Voice of Holland on 21 January 2011, and on BBC Radio 1's Live Lounge six days later. On 24 January 2011, during the week of the album's UK release, she performed an acoustic set of selected songs from 21 at London's Tabernacle music hall, which was screened live on her personal website. Adele performed "Someone like You" at the 2011 BRIT Awards ceremony, which was well received and resulted in a sales increase for both 19 and 21.

From September to October 2010, Adele embarked on a mini-promotional tour of the US, which included stops in New York and Minneapolis, as well as an exclusive appearance at the famous Club Largo in Los Angeles. Although she did not use Twitter at the time, Columbia created an account that redirected followers to the singer's personal blog. Throughout February, Adele's personal site hosted a "21 Days of Adele" promotion, which featured exclusive daily content, including a live chat and a video of the singer explaining the inspiration for each album track. The week of release was also accompanied by a spate of television appearances on many American daytime and late-night talk shows, such as the Today Show on 18 February, Late Show with David Letterman on 21 February, and The Ellen DeGeneres Show and Jimmy Kimmel Live! on 24 February. Adele performed "Someone like You" at the 2011 MTV Video Music Awards ceremony.

Adele embarked on her second concert tour, Adele: Live, in support of 21, scheduling more than 60 shows across Europe and North America. The shows received positive reviews, with many noting the show's understated nature, the singer's vocal performance, and her accessible persona. However, recurring health and vocal problems led to numerous alterations to the tour itinerary. The cancellation of the North American leg of the tour was due to a vocal haemorrhage on her vocal cords. The singer underwent corrective vocal surgery in November 2011 and cancelled all public appearances until February 2012. Adele performed "Rolling in the Deep" at the 2011 ECHO Awards, 2012 Grammy Awards, and 2012 BRIT Awards ceremonies.

21 yielded five singles in total, including four worldwide releases. The lead single "Rolling in the Deep" was released in November 2010 and peaked on the charts in the Netherlands, Germany, Belgium, Italy, and Switzerland. It became a top-ten hit in Austria, Canada, Denmark, Ireland, New Zealand, and Norway. Released in the UK on 16 January 2011, it peaked at number two. In the US, the song became "the most widely crossed-over song of the past twenty-five years," appearing on a record 12 different Billboard charts (including the Rock Songs chart, R&B/Hip-Hop Songs, and Hot Latin Songs charts). The song spent seven consecutive weeks at the top of the Hot 100, and was ranked as the top song and the best-selling song of the year.

"Someone like You" debuted at number 36 on the UK Singles Chart due to strong digital sales, and after falling to number 47, it ascended to number one when the singer performed it at the 2011 BRIT Awards. It peaked at number one in Australia, New Zealand, Italy, Finland, France, Switzerland, and the US. "Set Fire to the Rain," the third single, topped the singles chart in the US, the Netherlands and Belgium (Flanders), and reached the top five in Switzerland, Italy and Austria.

"Rumour Has It" was confirmed as the fourth and final official US single from the album by Ryan Tedder at the Grammy Awards in 2012, and was released on 1 March 2012. In some countries, "Turning Tables" was released as the fourth single. It was the fifth single to be released to US mainstream stations, although it received limited airplay due to an unofficial release. Even though "I'll Be Waiting" was never released as a single, it charted at No. 29 on the US Triple A chart.

== Critical reception ==
Professional ratings
Aggregate scores
Source	Rating
AnyDecentMusic?	7.1/10
Metacritic	76/100
Review scores
Source	Rating
AllMusic	5/5 stars
The Daily Telegraph	5/5 stars
Entertainment Weekly	A−
The Guardian	4/5 stars
The Independent	2/5 stars
NME	6/10
Pitchfork	8.2/10
Rolling Stone	3.5/5 stars
Spin	8/10
USA Today	3/4 stars

21 is widely considered to be Adele's magnum opus. At Metacritic, which assigns a normalised rating out of 100 to reviews from mainstream publications, the album received an average score of 76, based on 34 reviews. In the Chicago Tribune, Greg Kot deemed the music an improvement over 19, writing that "21 beefs up the rhythmic drive and the drama of the arrangements." Simon Harper of Clash wrote, "[In] two years ... she's clearly seen the world. Where 19 marked the turbulent swan song to a teenage life, 21 introduces the realities of adult life, where grown-up responsibilities collide with heartache and emotional scars run deep." John Murphy of MusicOMH said that it shared the themes of "pain, sadness and anger" explored on Amy Winehouse's Back to Black (2006), while hailing 21 as "one of the great 'break-up' albums, and the first truly impressive record of 2011." Sputnikmusic's Joseph Viney stated that 21 combined the "best bits of Aretha Franklin's old-school soul with Lauryn Hill's sass and sense of cynical modern femininity."

Sean Fennessey from The Village Voice wrote that the album "has a diva's stride and a diva's purpose. With a touch of sass and lots of grandeur, it's an often magical thing that insists on its importance ... the line here between melodrama and pathos is wafer-thin, and Adele toes it deftly. It's what separates her from her contemporaries in the mid-'00s wave of British white-girl r&b-dom." Q commented that, despite a "slightly scattershot quality ... greatness is tantalizingly within reach." In The New York Times, Jon Pareles applauded the singer's emotive timbre, comparing her to Dusty Springfield, Petula Clark, and Annie Lennox: "[Adele] can seethe, sob, rasp, swoop, lilt and belt, in ways that draw more attention to the song than to the singer." Ryan Reed of Paste regarded her voice as "a raspy, aged-beyond-its-years thing of full-blooded beauty", while MSN Music's Tom Townshend declared her "the finest singer of [our] generation".

Matthew Cole from Slant Magazine was less impressed, believing Adele's vocals masked the "blandness" of many of the songs, a fault that he said would have been more apparent had they been performed by a lesser talent. Allison Stewart of The Washington Post claimed that many tracks were remarkable "only because Adele is singing them." Robert Christgau gave the album a two-star honourable mention in his consumer guide for MSN Music, writing that "part of me likes how many albums this proud white-soul normal has sold, but the part that likes fast ones wins".

== Commercial performance ==
Globally, 21 is the best-selling album of the 2010s according to the International Federation of the Phonographic Industry, and topped the charts in more than 30 countries. Sales of 21 helped increase XL Recordings', Adele's record label, bank balance from £3 million to £32 million in the space of 12 months. 21 was the best-selling worldwide release in 2011 with 18 million units sold, and it remained the best-selling release with an additional 8.3 million units sold the following year.

=== Europe ===
21 debuted at number one on the UK Albums Chart on 30 January 2011 with first-week sales of 208,000 copies. 21 achieved separate consecutive number-one spells during its 2011 chart run, amassing 23 weeks at number one to date. Midway through 2012, 21 was the best-selling album of the year despite being released in early 2011. 21 sold over 5.08 million copies as of May 2018, making it the biggest-selling album since 2000 in the UK. As of October 2018, the album sold 5.11 million copies, making it the second biggest-selling studio album in the UK, and fourth best-selling album of all time. The success of 21 brought attention to Adele's previous work. 19 climbed to number four on the UK Albums Chart, making Adele the first living act since The Beatles in 1964 to have two UK top five albums and singles simultaneously. A week later, 19 rose to number 2 in its 102nd week of release, making Adele the first act to occupy the chart's top two spots since The Corrs in 1999.

Adele claimed the Guinness World Records for becoming the first female artist to have two singles and two albums in the UK top five simultaneously. 21 also became the first album in UK chart history to reach sales of three million copies in a calendar year, and set records for the most consecutive weeks with a UK number-one album (solo female) with 11 weeks, and the most cumulative weeks at number one (solo female) in the UK. 21 has been certified 16-times platinum by the British Phonographic Industry for shipments of 4,500,000 units. It is also the most downloaded album in UK history, the biggest-selling album of the 21st century in the UK, and the 4th best-selling album in the UK of all time. In December 2019, 21 was unveiled by the Official Charts Company as the decade's best-seller, with 5.17 million chart sales.

In July 2012, the album was certified decuple platinum by the IFPI, denoting sales of ten million copies across Europe, making it the highest-certified album in Europe since the IFPI Platinum Europe award was launched in 1996. The album lodged 35 weeks atop the Irish Albums Chart, the longest in the chart's history, and sold over 270,000 copies. Charting 124 weeks in Finland from early 2011 to summer of 2013 (with 11 weeks atop) and re-entering in early 2014, 21 became the second-longest-charting album of all time in the country.

=== Americas ===
Released on 22 February in the US, 21 debuted at number one on the Billboard 200 with first-week sales of 352,000 copies. The album remained in the top three for its first 24 weeks, the top five for a record 39 consecutive weeks, and the top 10 for a total of 84 weeks. The album is tied with Bruce Springsteen's Born in the U.S.A. for the second-most weeks in the top 10 of the Billboard 200. 21 became the best-selling digital album of all time in the US, selling 1.879 million copies by January 2012. On 17 May 2012, 21 became the 29th album since 1991 to sell over 9 million copies in the United States and became the first album in the United States to sell that amount since Usher's Confessions reached sales of 9 million in 2005. By November 2012, it had sold 10 million copies, a feat achieved in 92 weeks, making it the fastest album to sell 10 million since NSYNC's No Strings Attached in 2000. In February 2015, the album reached 208 straight weeks, or four years, on the Billboard 200 chart, spending only 24 of those weeks outside the Top 100.

21 is credited with saving the first quarter album sales of 2012 in the United States. Without 21, the first quarter of 2012 would have been down 3.4% compared to the first quarter of 2011. 21 sold more copies in the first quarter of 2012 than any album since 2005 and is the oldest album to be the best-selling album in the first quarter of the year since No Doubt's Tragic Kingdom in 1997. On 28 November 2012, the Recording Industry Association of America (RIAA) certified it Diamond after having sold more than 10 million copies in the United States alone, made it the first album released in the 2010s to achieve Diamond certification. In December 2012, it was announced that 21 was the best-selling album on iTunes for two years in a row. 21 was the best-selling album of both 2011 and 2012 in the United States and Canada despite being over a year old. It is the first album to be the best-selling album two years in a row since Michael Jackson's Thriller was the best-selling album of 1983 and 1984. Despite being over a year old, 21 sold more copies in 2012 than the best-selling albums of 2006 through 2010 sold in their respective years. It is also one of only four albums in the Nielsen SoundScan era to sell over 4 million copies in each of two calendar years. Due to these successes, Billboard declared Adele the Artist of the Year for the second year in a row, making her the first solo female artist to receive the honor twice.

In February 2013, 21 reached two full years on the Billboard 200, never charting lower than number 35 on the chart. This makes 21 the best-selling album of the past 10 years and the fifth best-selling album released since January 2000. In March 2013, after Adele won an Academy Award for "Skyfall", the album reentered the top 10 of the Billboard 200. This marked the album's 81st week in the top 10. Only two other albums have spent as much time in the top 10: Born in the U.S.A. and The Sound of Music. In November 2013, it was announced that 21 had become the first album to sell three million digital copies in the United States and that the album is the 13th best-selling overall in the United States since Nielsen SoundScan began tracking sales in 1991.

In November 2019, Billboard named 21 the best selling album of the 2010s. As of January 2020, 21 has sold 12 million copies in the United States, becoming the ninth largest-selling album since Nielsen Music started tracking sales in 1991 and best selling album of the 2010s decade. The album's performance on the Billboard 200 chart earned 21 the distinction of all-time number one album on the chart, according to a summary performed by Billboard in November 2015. In spring of 2017, the album broke the record for the longest-charting album by a female artist on the Billboard 200, surpassing Tapestry by Carole King. In February 2019, 21 has been listed on the Billboard 200 album chart for 400 non-consecutive weeks. 21 also became the first album by a woman to reach 450 weeks on the Billboard 200 in February 2020. In February 2021, 21 made history as the first album by a woman to reach 500 weeks on the Billboard 200. In December 2021, it was announced that 21 was the first album by a woman to spend an entire decade on the Billboard 200 chart.

In Canada, 21 spent 35 weeks at number one and was certified diamond in January 2012 by Music Canada for the shipment of 800,000 copies of the album. 21 had sold over 1.489 million copies by January 2013, making it the third best-selling album in Canada since Nielsen SoundScan started tracking sales.

=== Asia–Pacific ===
"Set Fire to the Rain" (2011)
A 23-second sample of "Set Fire to the Rain," which is written in the key of D minor with a tempo of 108 beats per minute.

21 spent 32 weeks at number one on the Australian ARIA Top 50 Albums Chart, 10 of which were consecutive. Adele also replicated her UK chart record when she achieved two titles in the top five of the ARIA Album and Singles chart simultaneously. In December 2012, it was announced that 21 was nearing sales of one million in Australia. This makes 21 only the seventh album to ever achieve this feat in Australia and the first to do so since Delta Goodrem's Innocent Eyes. In January 2020, 21 was announced as the biggest album of the 2010s in Australia. On the New Zealand RIANZ Albums Chart, 21 debuted at number one in January 2011 and spent 28 weeks at the summit in 2011. Its 38 accumulated weeks at the top are the longest in New Zealand chart history.

== Accolades ==
=== Rankings ===
21 was ranked as the number one album of all time on the Billboard Top 200 Albums of All Time. 21 appeared on many year-end best-of lists. Metacritic ranked 21 at number two on their list of 2011's most well-received records, based on inclusions in publications' year-end lists. The album was ranked the best album of the year by the Associated Press, The Austin Chronicle, Entertainment Weekly, Star Tribune, Digital Spy, MSN Music, New York Daily News, Rolling Stone, TIME magazine, and editors of USA Today. Critics at Billboard voted the album number-one of the year, while Scottish newspaper the Daily Record, editors of Amazon and the editors at Rhapsody also ranked the album at number one. The album appeared in the runner-up spot on MTV's list of the Best Albums of 2011 as well as lists produced by The Boston Globe and The Hollywood Reporter, It placed within the top 10 on lists produced by American Songwriter, Q, Los Angeles Times, Clash, and The Washington Post. "Rolling in the Deep" consistently placed high on various year-end critics' list, and was ranked the best song of the year in The Village Voice's Pazz and Jop mass critics' poll.

In 2012, Rolling Stone ranked the album number six on its list of Women Who Rock: The 50 Greatest Albums of All Time. As of January 2015, Billboard named 21 as the third-best album of the 2010s (so far). The album was also included in the book 1001 Albums You Must Hear Before You Die. In 2019, Rolling Stone, Consequence, Cleveland.com, Paste, and The Sydney Morning Herald named it the 8th, 19th, 47th, 55th, and 1st best album of the 2010s, respectively. Consequence of Sound also named it the fifth-best pop album of the 2010s. In 2020, the album was ranked at 137 on Rolling Stone's 500 Greatest Albums of All Time list. Consequence of Sound ranked the album at number seven on their list of "The 10 Greatest Second Albums of All Time". 21's commercial success effectively transformed Adele's image from a blue-eyed soul singer-songwriter to a global pop phenomenon. Entertainment Weekly considered it the record representing the year of 2011 on their 2020 list of the "30 essential albums from the last 30 years".

=== Industry awards ===
The album was nominated for the 2011 Barclaycard Mercury Prize, losing to Let England Shake by PJ Harvey. In November 2011, Adele won three American Music Awards including Favorite Pop/Rock Album for 21 at the American Music Awards of 2011. At the 2012 Billboard Music Awards, the singer was nominated for twenty categories, winning a record-breaking twelve, including Top Billboard 200 Album and Top Pop Album for 21, and Top Streaming Song (Audio) for "Rolling in the Deep". In May 2013, Adele received five nominations at the 2013 Billboard Music Awards, including Top Billboard 200 Album and Top Pop Album for 21 two years in a row; she won the latter award.

The album earned Adele seven Grammys. In February 2012, she won the Grammy Awards for Album of the Year and Best Pop Vocal Album for 21, Record of the Year, Song of the Year, and Best Short Form Music Video for "Rolling in the Deep," and Best Pop Solo Performance for "Someone like You" at the 54th Annual Grammy Awards. Additionally, her producer Paul Epworth won Producer of the Year, Non-Classical. Adele, who was named Best New Artist in 2009, is only the second artist and the first female in history to win all four major Grammy categories. Christopher Cross achieved the same feat in 1981 with a four-award sweep. She is only the eighth artist in Grammy history to win six or more awards in one night, matching the record set among female artists by Beyoncé in 2010.

With her wins, Adele became only the sixth artist to win "Grammy's Triple Crown" in one night. She was only the second female solo artist to achieve this feat, following Carole King in 1972, and only the second British artist, after Eric Clapton in 1993. At the age of 22, Adele was the youngest artist at the time to achieve this feat. That record was later broken by Billie Eilish, who was 18 years old when she won all "big four" Grammys in one night in 2020. In February 2013, a live rendition of the album's third single "Set Fire to the Rain," included on Live at the Royal Albert Hall, won the Grammy for Best Pop Solo Performance at the 55th Annual Grammy Awards, making her the first artist to win consecutively in this category. On 21 February 2012, 21 won the British Album of the Year at the 2012 BRIT Awards. It also won the International Album of the Year at the Juno Awards of 2012.

Year	Ceremony	Category	Result	Ref.
2011	American Music Awards	Favorite Pop/Rock Album	Won	
2011	AIM Independent Music Awards	Best "Difficult" Second Album	Won	
2011	Danish Music Awards	International Album of the Year	Won	
2011	GAFFA Awards	Best Foreign Album	Won	
2011	Independent Music Companies Association	European Independent Album of the Year	Won	
2011	Mercury Prize	Album of the Year	Nominated	
2011	MOBO Awards	Best Album	Nominated	
2011	Soul Train Music Awards	Album of the Year	Nominated	
2011	Urban Music Awards	Best Album	Nominated	
2012	Billboard Music Awards	Top Billboard 200 Album	Won	
2012	Billboard Music Awards	Top Pop Album	Won	
2012	Brit Awards	British Album of the Year	Won	
2012	ECHO Music Awards	Album of the Year	Won	
2012	Fryderyk	Best International Album	Won	
2012	Grammis Awards	Best International Album	Won	
2012	Grammy Awards	Album of the Year	Won	
2012	Grammy Awards	Best Pop Vocal Album	Won	
2012	Ivor Novello Awards	Album of the Year	Nominated	
2012	Juno Awards	International Album of the Year	Won	
2012	People's Choice Awards	Favourite Album of the Year	Nominated	
2012	Premios Oye!	Best English Album	Won	
2013	Billboard Music Awards	Top Billboard 200 Album	Nominated	
2013	Billboard Music Awards	Top Pop Album	Won	
2014	World Music Awards	World's Best Album	Nominated	

== Legacy ==
[21] appealed to Baby Boomers nostalgic for Etta James, Carole King and 'Dusty in Memphis.' It also appealed to teens struggling with the first sting of heartbreak, hipsters who missed Amy Winehouse, traditionalists weary of synthesizers and vocal effects, and non-pop fans who simply found it refreshing to hear a singer belt out her blues with conviction. By singing almost exclusively about a relationship gone wrong, Adele made songs that anyone could identify with ... 21 wasn't niche-marketed. It was made for everyone and ... everyone listened.

— Tris McCall of The Star-Ledger

The album's success has been attributed to its cross-cultural appeal, which has catered to fans of various genres of pop, adult contemporary, and R&B, as well as various generations and musical timelines. According to Sasha Frere-Jones of The New Yorker, the album's success in the US can be attributed to its target audience—that is, "middle-aged moms ... the demographic that decides American elections." Critics also suggest that the album's understated musical production and relative lack of artifice are striking deviations from the "bombastic theatrics" of the mainstream music industry. Ethan Smith of The Wall Street Journal found that Adele's "deliberately unflashy" nature, full figure, and "everywoman" appeal gave her a lucrative niche in the market, while her tendency to emphasize "substance over style" made her the "Anti-Lady Gaga". Guy Adams of The Independent argued that 21's success signals the re-emergence of the more traditional approach to commercial success:

There are two approaches to the business of being noticed by today's record-buying public. The first ... revolves around oodles of hype and ever-more preposterous wardrobe selections. The second ... requires ... the confidence to let your music do the talking... Amazingly, given preconceived notions about America's supposed preference for style over substance, it is the second of these two sales techniques which appear to be working better.

With the release of 21, critics began to tout Adele as the new torchbearer for the British soul music that ascended to the American mainstream via Duffy, Joss Stone, Amy Winehouse and Lily Allen. Although the initial popularity of these artists in the early 2000s incited the media to declare a "new wave of British invasion", Joseph Viney of Sputnikmusic saw their subsequent absence as an opportunity for Adele to "stake her claim as the UK's leading solo female artist". John Murphy of MusicOMH declared the album "a timely reminder that British soul hasn't lost its mojo". Indie label XL Recordings founder Richard Russell discussed what he believed to be the quasi-subversiveness of 21's chart dominance. Characterising the success of 21 as "almost political and sort of radical", Russell stated that the lack of gimmicks in Adele's music undermined the widespread perception that female performers have to conform to specific body types, or imbue their music with gratuitous sexual imagery, to attain success.

Retrospectively, the album received widespread critical praise. Stereogum wrote that 21 established Adele as "pop royalty" and called the album "one of history's great, resilient breakup albums", while Pitchfork praised the album for "cementing her legacy as an artist who could make once-in-a-generation milestones out of her music". Atwood Magazine compared the album to Frank Ocean's Blonde, as they are both second albums, and commented that both albums "could slide into the catalogues of greats like Amy Winehouse and Aretha Franklin and no one would be the wiser" and called Adele "one of the most captivating songwriters of the 21st century". NME described 21 as a "heartbreak pop classic" and further emphasized that it is "so classic in a way that stands the test of time". In an article explaining Adele's record-breaking achievements and impact, The Recording Academy wrote that "Plenty of albums have tapped into emotional truths; few have endured like 21", and further commented that 21 "continues to resonate with audiences in 2021 as much as it did in 2011". Both Junkee and Consequence of Sound credited the album for revitalizing pop music, heralding "a new era of relatable pop", and inspiring a new generation of artists.

== Track listing ==
Standard edition
No.	Title	Writer(s)	Producer(s)	Length
1.	"Rolling in the Deep"	Adele Adkins; Paul Epworth	Epworth	3:49
2.	"Rumour Has It"	Adkins; Ryan Tedder	Tedder	3:43
3.	"Turning Tables"	Adkins; Tedder	Jim Abbiss	4:10
4.	"Don't You Remember"	Adkins; Dan Wilson	Rick Rubin	4:03
5.	"Set Fire to the Rain"	Adkins; Fraser T. Smith	Smith	4:01
6.	"He Won't Go"	Adkins; Epworth	Rubin	4:37
7.	"Take It All"	Adkins; Francis White	Abbiss	3:48
8.	"I'll Be Waiting"	Adkins; Epworth	Epworth	4:01
9.	"One and Only"	Adkins; Wilson; Greg Wells	Rubin	5:48
10.	"Lovesong"	Robert Smith; Simon Gallup; Boris Williams; Pearl Thompson; Roger O'Donnell	Rubin	5:16
11.	"Someone like You"	Adkins; Wilson	Wilson; Adkins	4:47
Total length:				48:01

iTunes Store bonus track
No.	Title	Writer(s)	Producer(s)	Length
12.	"I Found a Boy"	Adkins	Rubin	3:37
Total length:				51:40

iTunes pre-order edition bonus track
No.	Title	Writer(s)	Producer(s)	Length
13.	"Rolling in the Deep" (live acoustic)	Adkins; Epworth	Epworth	4:07
Total length:				52:10

Japan edition bonus tracks
No.	Title	Writer(s)	Producer(s)	Length
12.	"I Found a Boy"	Adkins	Rubin	3:37
13.	"Turning Tables" (live acoustic)	Adkins; Tedder	Abbiss	4:20
14.	"Don't You Remember" (live acoustic)	Adkins; Wilson	Rubin	4:18
15.	"Someone like You" (live acoustic)	Adkins; Wilson	Wilson; Adkins	5:14
Total length:				65:32

Deluxe edition bonus disc
No.	Title	Lyrics	Producer(s)	Length
12.	"Need You Now" (featuring Darius Rucker) (live at CMT Artists of the Year Awards)	Dave Haywood; Charles Kelley; Hillary Scott; Josh Kear		3:55
13.	"Someone like You" (live acoustic)	Adkins; Wilson	Wilson; Adkins	5:14
14.	"Turning Tables" (live acoustic)	Adkins; Tedder	Abbiss	4:20
15.	"Don't You Remember" (live acoustic)	Adkins; Wilson	Rubin	4:18
Total length:				65:50

Notes

- "Lovesong" is a The Cure cover.
- "If It Hadn't Been for Love" is a The SteelDrivers cover.
- "Hiding My Heart" is a Brandi Carlile cover.
- "Need You Now" is a Lady A cover.

== Personnel ==
Adapted from AllMusic and 21's liner notes.

Production

- Jim Abbiss – producer and mixing (3, 7)
- Adele – design, producer (11)
- Philip Allen – engineer (11)
- Beatriz Artola – engineer (5)
- Phillip Broussard Jr. – assistant engineer (4, 6, 9, 10)
- Lindsay Chase – production co-ordination (4, 6, 9, 10)
- AJ Clark – assistant engineer (2)
- Tom Coyne – mastering
- Ian Dowling – mixing (3, 7)
- Lauren Dukoff – photography
- Tom Elmhirst – mixing (1, 2, 8, 11)
- Paul Epworth – producer (1, 8)
- Greg Fidelman – engineer (4, 6, 9, 10)
- Sara Lyn Killion – assistant engineer (4, 6, 9, 10)
- Phil Lee – design
- Dana Nielsen – editing, Pro Tools
- Dan Parry – assistant mixing (1, 2, 8, 11), vocal engineer (2)
- Steve Price – strings engineer (5)
- Mark Rankin – engineer (1, 8)
- Rick Rubin – producer (4, 6, 9, 10)
- Andrew Scheps – mixing (4, 6, 9, 10)
- Isabel Seeliger-Morley – assistant engineer (5)
- Fraser T Smith – producer and mixing (5)
- Ryan Tedder – producer, engineer, programming and arranger (2)
- Dan Wilson – producer (11)

Music

- Adele Adkins – lead vocals
- Jo Allen – violin (5)
- Stephanie Bennett;– harp (4, 6, 9, 10)
- Jerrod Bettis – drums and acoustic guitar (2)
- Rachel Stephanie Bolt – strings (3)
- Natalie Bonner – violin (5)
- Harry Brown – horn arrangements and trombone (8)
- David Campbell – string arrangements (4, 6, 9, 10)
- Ray Carless – tenor saxophone (1, 8)
- Carmen Carter – choir (4, 6, 9, 10)
- Lenny Castro – percussion (4, 6, 9, 10)
- Stephanie Cavey – violin (5)
- Neil Cowley – piano (1, 3, 7, 8)
- Caroline Dale – strings (3)
- David Daniels – strings (3)
- Rosie Danvers – string arrangements and violin (5)
- Chris Dave – drums (4, 6, 9, 10)
- Chris Elliot – string arrangements (3)
- Paul Epworth – bass, acoustic guitar, electric guitar, percussion, and background vocals (1, 8)
- Jimmy Gilstrap – choir (4, 6, 9, 10)
- David Hidalgo – accordion and banjo (4, 6, 9, 10)
- Smokey Hormel – guitar (4, 6, 9, 10)
- Patrick Kiernan – strings (3)
- Boguslaw Kostecki – strings (3)
- Peter Lale – strings (3)
- Noel Langley – trumpet (1, 8)
- Chris Laurence – strings (3)
- Julian Leaper – strings (3)
- Rita Manning – strings (3)
- Eleanor Mathieson – violin (5)
- Stephen Morris – strings (3)
- Jane Oliver – strings (5)
- Emma Owens – strings (5)
- Pino Palladino – bass (4, 6, 9, 10)
- Tom Pigott-Smith – strings (3)
- Ruston Pomeroy – violin (5)
- Hayley Pomfrett – violin (5)
- Josef Powell – choir (4, 6, 9, 10)
- James Poyser – piano (4, 6, 9, 10)
- Jenny Sacha – violin (5)
- Kotono Sato – violin (5)
- Jackie Shave – strings (3)
- Lucy Shaw – strings (5)
- Emlyn Singleton – strings (3)
- Ash Soan – drums (5)
- Fraser T Smith – bass guitar and piano (5)
- Amy Stanford – strings (5)
- Matt Sweeney – guitar (4, 6, 9, 10)
- Leo Taylor – drums (1, 8)
- Ryan Tedder – electric guitar, bass, piano, Hammond B3, drums, and string arrangement (2)
- Ben Thomas – acoustic and electric guitar (8)
- Cathy Thompson – strings (3)
- Julia Tillman Waters – choir (4, 6, 9, 10)
- Carmen Twillie – choir (4, 6, 9, 10)
- Lorna Maxine Waters – choir (4, 6, 9, 10)
- Oren Waters – choir director (4, 6, 9, 10)
- Bruce White – strings (3)
- Dan Wilson – piano (11)
- The Wired Strings – strings (5)
- Chris Worsey – strings (3)
- Terry Young – choir (4, 6, 9, 10)
- Warren Zielinski – strings (3)

== Charts ==
=== Weekly charts ===
Chart (2011–2015)	Peak position
Argentine Albums (CAPIF)	1
Australian Albums (ARIA)	1
Austrian Albums (Ö3 Austria)	1
Belgian Albums (Ultratop Flanders)	1
Belgian Albums (Ultratop Wallonia)	1
Brazilian Albums (ABPD)	1
Canadian Albums (Billboard)	1
Croatian Albums (HDU)	1
Czech Albums (IFPI)	1
Danish Albums (Hitlisten)	1
Dutch Albums (Album Top 100)	1
Finnish Albums (Suomen virallinen lista)	1
French Albums (SNEP)	1
German Albums (Offizielle Top 100)	1
German Independent Albums (Top 20 Independent)	1
Greek Albums (IFPI)	1
Hungarian Albums (MAHASZ)	1
Irish Albums (IRMA)	1
Italian Albums (FIMI)	1
Japanese Albums (Oricon)	4
Mexican Albums (Top 100 Mexico)	1
New Zealand Albums (RMNZ)	1
Norwegian Albums (VG-lista)	1
Polish Albums (ZPAV)	1
Portuguese Albums (AFP)	3
Russian Albums (TopHit)	2
Scottish Albums (Official Charts)	1
Slovenian Albums Chart	1
South African Albums (RiSA)	1
South Korean International Albums (Gaon)	3
South Korean Albums (Gaon)	41
Spanish Albums (Promusicae)	2
Swedish Albums (Sverigetopplistan)	1
Swiss Albums (Schweizer Hitparade)	1
UK Albums (Official Charts)	1
UK Independent Albums (Official Charts)	1
US Billboard 200	1

Chart (2017)	Peak position
Latvian Albums (LaIPA)	64

Chart (2021–2023)	Peak position
Icelandic Albums (Tónlistinn)	26
US Independent Albums (Billboard)	3

=== Decade-end charts ===
Chart (2010–2019)	Position
Australian Albums (ARIA)	1
Canadian Albums (Billboard)	1
Dutch Albums (Album Top 100)	1
German Albums (Offizielle Top 100)	4
Norwegian Albums (VG-lista)	1
UK Albums (OCC)	1
US Billboard 200	1

=== Year-end charts ===
Chart (2011)	Position
Argentine Albums (CAPIF)	10
Australian Albums (ARIA)	1
Austrian Albums (Ö3 Austria)	2
Belgian Albums (Ultratop Flanders)	1
Belgian Albums (Ultratop Wallonia)	1
Brazilian Albums (ABPD)	8
Canadian Albums (Billboard)	1
Danish Albums (Hitlisten)	2
Dutch Albums (Album Top 100)	1
Finnish Albums (Suomen virallinen lista)	1
French Albums (SNEP)	1
German Albums (Offizielle Top 100)	1
Hungarian Albums (MAHASZ)	33
Irish Albums (IRMA)	1
Italian Albums (FIMI)	4
Mexican Albums (Top 100 Mexico)	5
New Zealand Albums (RMNZ)	1
Polish Albums (ZPAV)	1
South African Albums (RiSA)	1
Spanish Albums (PROMUSICAE)	5
Swedish Albums (Sverigetopplistan)	2
Swiss Albums (Schweizer Hitparade)	1
UK Albums (OCC)	1
US (Billboard 200)	1
Worldwide Albums (IFPI Global Music Report)	1

Chart (2012)	Position
Argentine Albums (CAPIF)	1
Australian Albums (ARIA)	3
Austrian Albums (Ö3 Austria)	1
Belgian Albums (Ultratop Flanders)	1
Belgian Albums (Ultratop Wallonia)	1
Brazilian Albums (ABPD)	6
Canadian Albums (Billboard)	1
Danish Albums (Hitlisten)	5
Dutch Albums (Album Top 100)	1
Finnish Albums (Suomen virallinen lista)	1
French Albums (SNEP)	1
German Albums (Offizielle Top 100)	3
Hungarian Albums (MAHASZ)	6
Irish Albums (IRMA)	7
Italian Albums (FIMI)	2
Japan Hot Albums (Billboard Japan)	78
Japanese Albums (Oricon)	35
Mexican Albums (Top 100 Mexico)	2
New Zealand Albums (RMNZ)	1
Polish Albums (ZPAV)	1
Russian Albums (2M)	4
Spanish Albums (PROMUSICAE)	4
Swedish Albums (Sverigetopplistan)	15
Swiss Albums (Schweizer Hitparade)	1
UK Albums (OCC)	2
US (Billboard 200)	1
Worldwide Albums (IFPI Global Music Report)	1

Chart (2013)	Position
Argentine Albums (CAPIF)	39
Australian Albums (ARIA)	60
Austrian Albums (Ö3 Austria)	63
Belgian Albums (Ultratop Flanders)	8
Belgian Albums (Ultratop Wallonia)	32
Canadian Albums (Billboard)	21
Danish Albums (Hitlisten)	48
Dutch Albums (Album Top 100)	23
German Albums (Offizielle Top 100)	100
Hungarian Albums (MAHASZ)	35
Italian Albums (FIMI)	51
New Zealand Albums (RMNZ)	18
Swedish Albums (Sverigetopplistan)	93
Swiss Albums (Schweizer Hitparade)	15
UK Albums (OCC)	72
US Billboard 200	21

Chart (2014)	Position
Belgian Albums (Ultratop Flanders)	33
Belgian Albums (Ultratop Wallonia)	108
Dutch Albums (Album Top 100)	98
New Zealand Albums (RMNZ)	42
US Billboard 200	76

Chart (2015)	Position
Australian Albums (ARIA)	32
Dutch Albums (Album Top 100)	26
Italian Albums (FIMI)	89
New Zealand Albums (RMNZ)	35
South Korean Albums International (Gaon)	17
Swedish Albums (Sverigetopplistan)	38
UK Albums (OCC)	45
US Billboard 200	74

Chart (2016)	Position
Australian Albums (ARIA)	29
Canadian Albums (Billboard)	25
Danish Albums (Hitlisten)	43
Dutch Albums (Album Top 100)	27
New Zealand Albums (RMNZ)	31
South Korean Albums International (Gaon)	10
Swedish Albums (Sverigetopplistan)	32
Swiss Albums (Schweizer Hitparade)	49
UK Albums (OCC)	47
US Billboard 200	24

Chart (2017)	Position
Australian Albums (ARIA)	26
Danish Albums (Hitlisten)	75
Dutch Albums (Album Top 100)	55
New Zealand Albums (RMNZ)	16
South Korean International Albums (Gaon)	27
Swedish Albums (Sverigetopplistan)	40
US Billboard 200	107

Chart (2018)	Position
Australian Albums (ARIA)	87
Icelandic Albums (Tónlistinn)	69
South Korean International Albums (Gaon)	55
Swedish Albums (Sverigetopplistan)	59
US Billboard 200	179

Chart (2019)	Position
Australian Albums (ARIA)	90
Belgian Albums (Ultratop Flanders)	75
Icelandic Albums (Tónlistinn)	76
Swedish Albums (Sverigetopplistan)	75
US Billboard 200	158

Chart (2020)	Position
Australian Albums (ARIA)	92
Belgian Albums (Ultratop Flanders)	79
Dutch Albums (Album Top 100)	58
Icelandic Albums (Tónlistinn)	87
Swedish Albums (Sverigetopplistan)	80
UK Albums (OCC)	98
US Billboard 200	132

Chart (2021)	Position
Australian Albums (ARIA)	57
Belgian Albums (Ultratop Flanders)	40
Belgian Albums (Ultratop Wallonia)	141
Danish Albums (Hitlisten)	54
Dutch Albums (Album Top 100)	31
Icelandic Albums (Tónlistinn)	44
Swedish Albums (Sverigetopplistan)	38
UK Albums (OCC)	49
US Billboard 200	198

Chart (2022)	Position
Australian Albums (ARIA)	76
Belgian Albums (Ultratop Flanders)	37
Belgian Albums (Ultratop Wallonia)	130
Danish Albums (Hitlisten)	60
Dutch Albums (Album Top 100)	23
Icelandic Albums (Tónlistinn)	45
Lithuanian Albums (AGATA)	68
Swedish Albums (Sverigetopplistan)	51
UK Albums (OCC)	79
US Billboard 200	164

Chart (2023)	Position
Australian Albums (ARIA)	62
Belgian Albums (Ultratop Flanders)	41
Belgian Albums (Ultratop Wallonia)	109
Danish Albums (Hitlisten)	52
Dutch Albums (Album Top 100)	14
Icelandic Albums (Tónlistinn)	27
Swedish Albums (Sverigetopplistan)	25
UK Albums (OCC)	61
US Billboard 200	163

Chart (2024)	Position
Australian Albums (ARIA)	95
Belgian Albums (Ultratop Flanders)	25
Belgian Albums (Ultratop Wallonia)	86
Danish Albums (Hitlisten)	57
Dutch Albums (Album Top 100)	13
Icelandic Albums (Tónlistinn)	51
Swedish Albums (Sverigetopplistan)	25
UK Albums (OCC)	85

Chart (2025)	Position
Belgian Albums (Ultratop Flanders)	48
Belgian Albums (Ultratop Wallonia)	116
Dutch Albums (Album Top 100)	26
German Albums (Offizielle Top 100)	78
Icelandic Albums (Tónlistinn)	100
Swedish Albums (Sverigetopplistan)	56

== Certifications and sales ==
Certifications for 21, with pure sales where available
Region	Certification	Certified units/sales
Argentina (CAPIF)	4× Platinum	160,000^{^}
Australia (ARIA)	17× Platinum	1,190,000^{‡}
Austria (IFPI Austria)	Platinum	20,000^{*}
Belgium (BRMA)	6× Platinum	180,000^{*}
Brazil (Pro-Música Brasil)	3× Diamond	480,000^{‡}
Canada (Music Canada)	2× Diamond	1,600,000^{‡}
Chile	2× Platinum	40,000
Colombia	Gold	
Denmark (IFPI Danmark)	11× Platinum	220,000^{‡}
Finland (Musiikkituottajat)	2× Platinum	83,234
France	—	1,740,000
Germany (BVMI)	8× Platinum	1,600,000^{^}
Greece (IFPI Greece)	Platinum	6,000^{^}
Hungary (MAHASZ)	Platinum	6,000^{^}
Iceland (FHF)	Gold	2,500
Ireland (IRMA)	18× Platinum	270,000
Israel	Platinum	40,000
Italy (FIMI)	9× Platinum	450,000^{‡}
Japan (RIAJ)	Gold	200,000
Mexico (AMPROFON)	Diamond+3× Platinum	480,000^{‡}
Netherlands (NVPI)	4× Platinum	500,000
New Zealand (RMNZ)	18× Platinum	270,000^{‡}
Norway (IFPI Norway)	Platinum	100,000
Poland (ZPAV)	2× Diamond	200,000^{*}
Portugal (AFP)	2× Platinum	30,000^{^}
Russia (NFPF)	Platinum	10,000^{*}
South Africa	—	30,000
South Korea (KMCA)	—	11,583
Spain (Promusicae)	5× Platinum	300,000^{^}
Sweden (GLF)	3× Platinum	140,000
Switzerland (IFPI Switzerland)	7× Platinum	210,000^{^}
Taiwan	—	12,000
United Kingdom (BPI)	19× Platinum	5,738,664
United States (RIAA)	17× Platinum	17,000,000^{‡}
Venezuela	—	10,000
Summaries
Europe (IFPI)	10× Platinum	10,000,000^{*}
Worldwide	—	31,000,000
^{*} Sales figures based on certification alone.^{^} Shipments figures based on certification alone.^{‡} Sales+streaming figures based on certification alone.

== Release history ==
Region	Release date	Format	Label
Japan	5 January 2011 19 January 2011	CD; digital download	Hostess
Germany	21 January 2011	CD; digital download	XL
Ireland	21 January 2011	CD; digital download	XL
Australia	24 January 2011	CD; digital download	XL
Austria	24 January 2011	CD; digital download	XL
Finland	24 January 2011	CD; digital download	XL
Netherlands	24 January 2011	CD; digital download	XL
Switzerland	24 January 2011	CD; digital download	XL
United Kingdom	24 January 2011	CD; Limited edition	XL
Poland	24 January 2011	CD; Limited edition	XL
France	24 January 2011	CD; digital download; LP	XL
United States	22 February 2011	CD; digital download; LP	Columbia
Canada	22 February 2011	CD; digital download; LP	Columbia
Mexico	5 April 2011	CD; digital download	Sony Mexico
China	7 March 2013	CD	Starsing

== See also ==
- List of best-selling albums
- List of best-selling albums by women
- List of best-selling albums in the United Kingdom
- List of best-selling albums of the 21st century in the United Kingdom
- List of best-selling albums of the 2010s in the United Kingdom
- List of best-selling albums in Australia
- List of best-selling albums in Canada
- List of diamond-certified albums in Canada
- List of best-selling albums in France
- List of best-selling albums in Germany
- List of best-selling albums in the Netherlands
- List of best-selling albums in New Zealand
- List of best-selling albums in the United States
- List of best-selling albums by year in the United States
- List of best-selling albums in the United States of the Nielsen SoundScan era
