= List of best-selling albums by year in the United States =

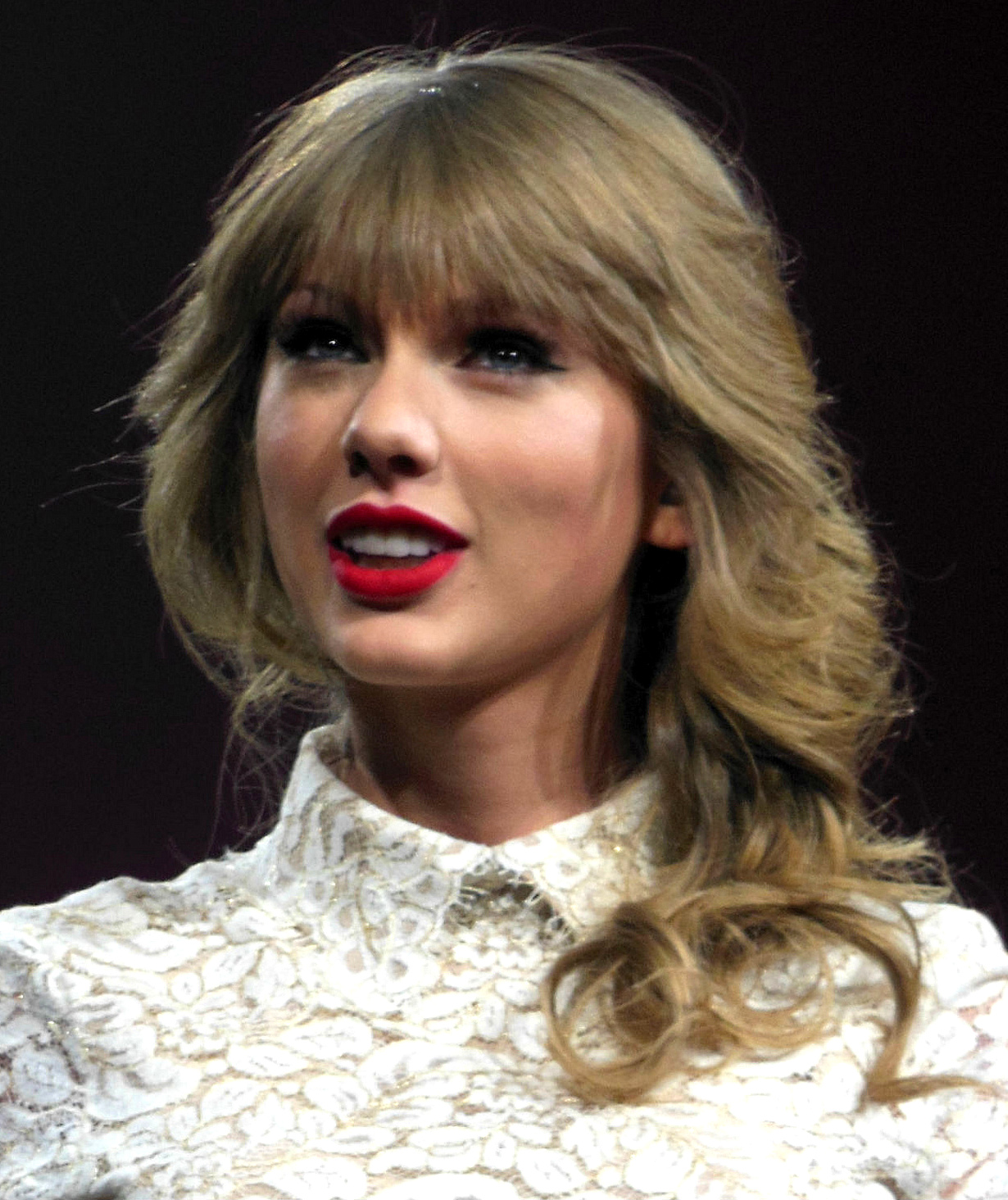
Taylor Swift is the first and only artist to garner the best-selling album of the year nine times. Swift is also the only artist to have the annual top-selling album in three separate decades (2000s, 2010s and 2020s).

This is a list of the best-selling albums by year in the United States, published by American music magazine Billboard since 1956 as year-end rankings of album sales. Until 1991, the Billboard album chart was based on a survey of representative retail outlets that determined a ranking, not a tally of actual sales. Weekly surveys and year-end charts by Billboard and other publications such as now defunct Cash Box magazine sometimes differed. For instance, during the 1960s and 1970s, the number-one album as determined by these two publications differed in 10 out of 20 years. From 1992 onwards, the Billboard year-end and weekly charts were calculated by Nielsen SoundScan. Note that this slightly differs from prior Billboard year-end album charts, which were a measure of chart performances over twelve months from around December to November (cutoff determined by Billboard's publication schedule) rather than actual total sales. In addition, certain additions post-2015 may differ from best-selling albums in the United States of the Nielsen SoundScan era, which includes album-equivalent units by means of streaming.

Harry Belafonte's Calypso (1956) was the first record to be recognized as a year's top-selling album by Billboard, when it started tracking sales figures. American singer-songwriter Taylor Swift is the first and only artist to have nine of their albums become best-selling records of their respective years. She accomplished this with Fearless (2009), 1989 (2014), Reputation (2017), Lover (2019), Folklore (2020), Midnights (2022), 1989 (Taylor's Version) (2023), The Tortured Poets Department (2024), and The Life of a Showgirl (2025). American acts Mariah Carey, Whitney Houston and Eminem, and British acts Elton John and Adele have had two of their albums be the top-sellers in two separate years. American singer Michael Jackson's 1982 album, Thriller became the best-selling record in the country for two consecutive years in 1983 and 1984. Other albums to achieve the same accomplishment included the My Fair Lady Original Cast Recording from the hit 1956 Broadway production in 1957 and 1958, the original soundtrack of West Side Story in 1962 and 1963, Adele's 21 in 2011 and 2012, and 25 in 2015 and 2016. English group Spice Girls are the only girl group to appear on the list, as their debut record Spice was the best-selling album of 1997.

== 1950s ==
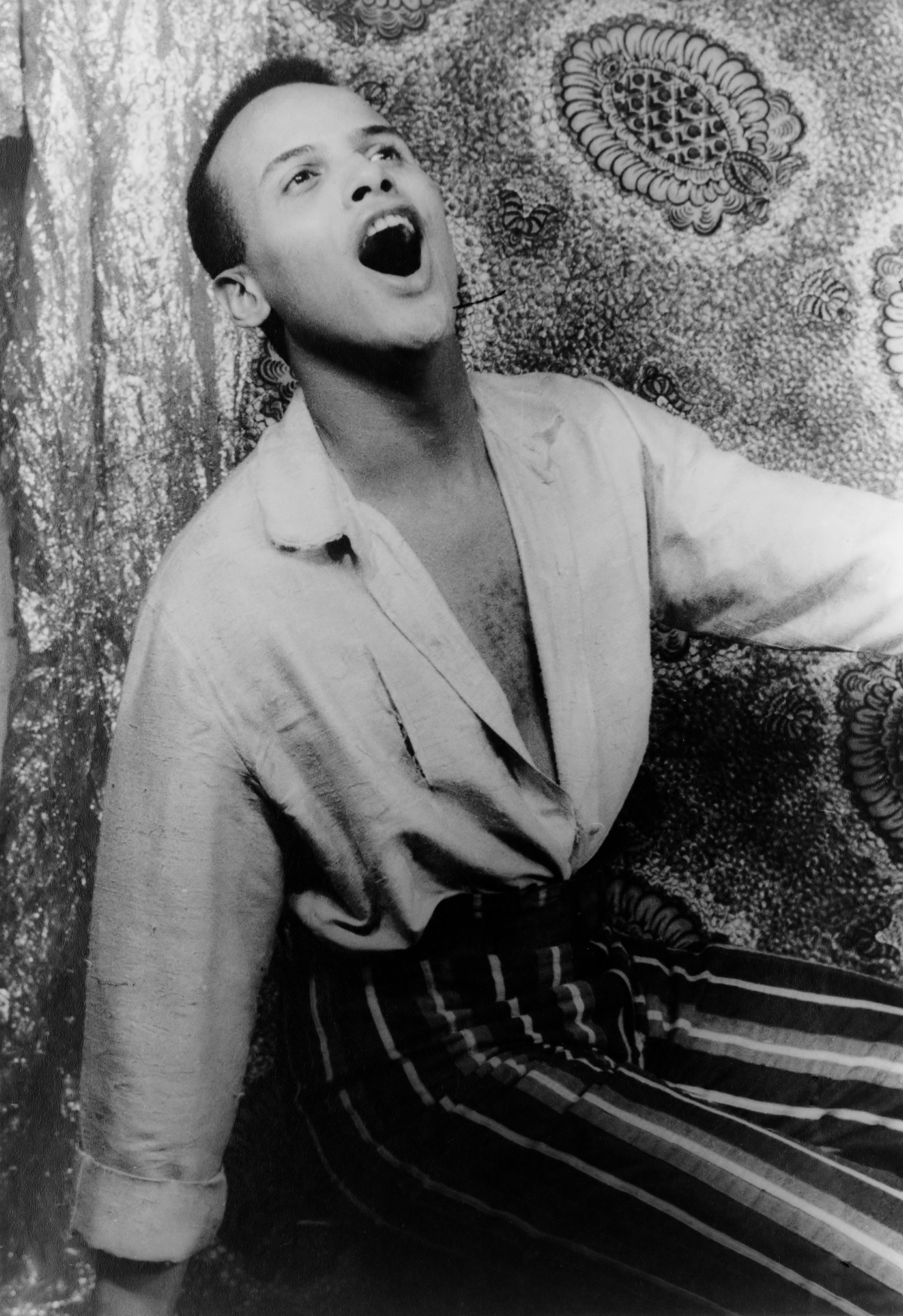
Harry Belafonte's Calypso was labeled the US's top-selling record of 1956.

Year^{[I]}	Artist(s)	Nationality	Album	Ref.
1956	Harry Belafonte	United States	Calypso	
1957	Original Broadway Cast	United States	My Fair Lady	
1958	Original Broadway Cast	United States	My Fair Lady	
1959	Henry Mancini	United States	Music from Peter Gunn	

== 1960s ==
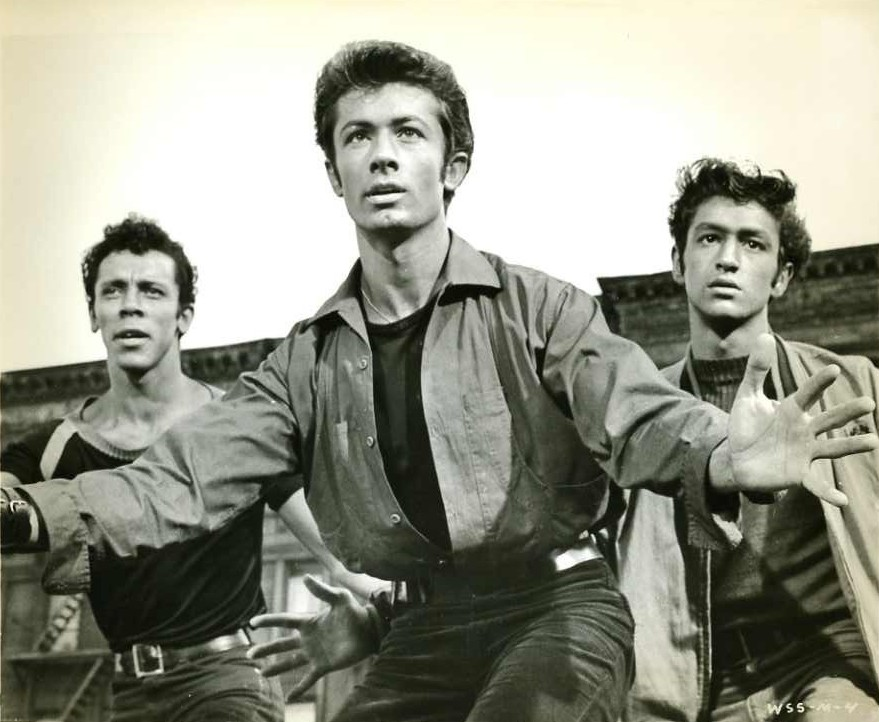
West Side Story's soundtrack was the best-selling album for two consecutive years.

Year	Artist(s)	Nationality	Album	Ref.
1960	Original Broadway Cast	–	The Sound of Music	
1961	Original Broadway Cast	–	Camelot	
1962	Soundtrack	–	West Side Story	
1963	Soundtrack	–	West Side Story	
1964	Original Broadway Cast	–	Hello, Dolly!	
1965	Soundtrack	–	Mary Poppins	
1966	Herb Alpert & The Tijuana Brass	United States	Whipped Cream & Other Delights	
1967	The Monkees	United States	More of The Monkees	
1968	The Jimi Hendrix Experience	United States	Are You Experienced?	
1969	Iron Butterfly	United States	In-A-Gadda-Da-Vida	

== 1970s ==
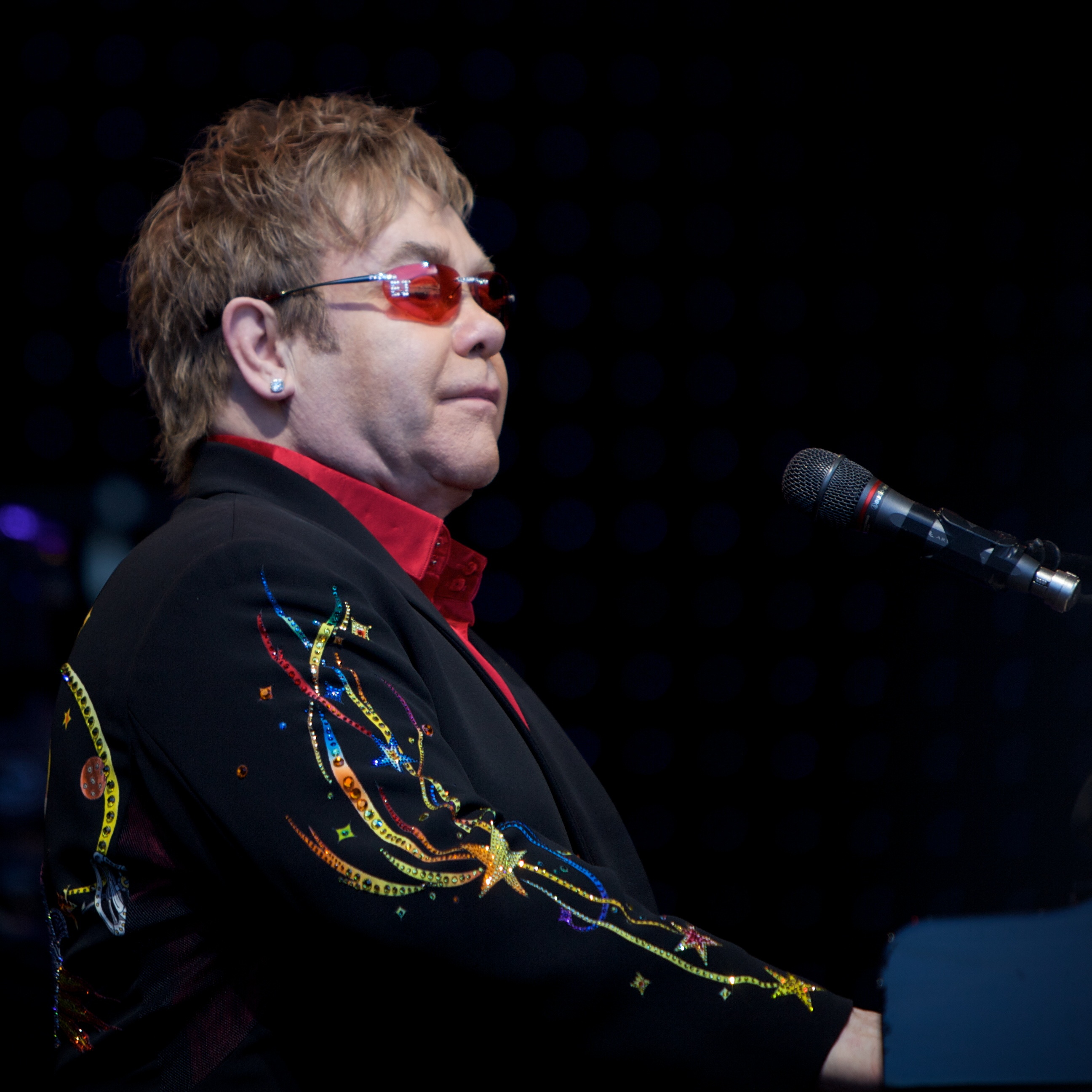
Two of Elton John's albums each became the best-selling record in the 1970s.

Year^{[I]}	Performing artist(s)	Nationality	Album	Ref.
1970	Simon and Garfunkel	United States	Bridge over Troubled Water	
1971	Various Artists	–	Jesus Christ Superstar	
1972	Neil Young	Canada	Harvest	
1973	War	United States	The World Is a Ghetto	
1974	Elton John	United Kingdom	Goodbye Yellow Brick Road	
1975	Elton John	United Kingdom	Elton John's Greatest Hits	
1976	Peter Frampton	United Kingdom / United States	Frampton Comes Alive	
1977	Fleetwood Mac	United Kingdom / United States	Rumours	
1978	Soundtrack / Bee Gees	–	Saturday Night Fever (soundtrack)	
1979	Billy Joel	United States	52nd Street	

== 1980s ==
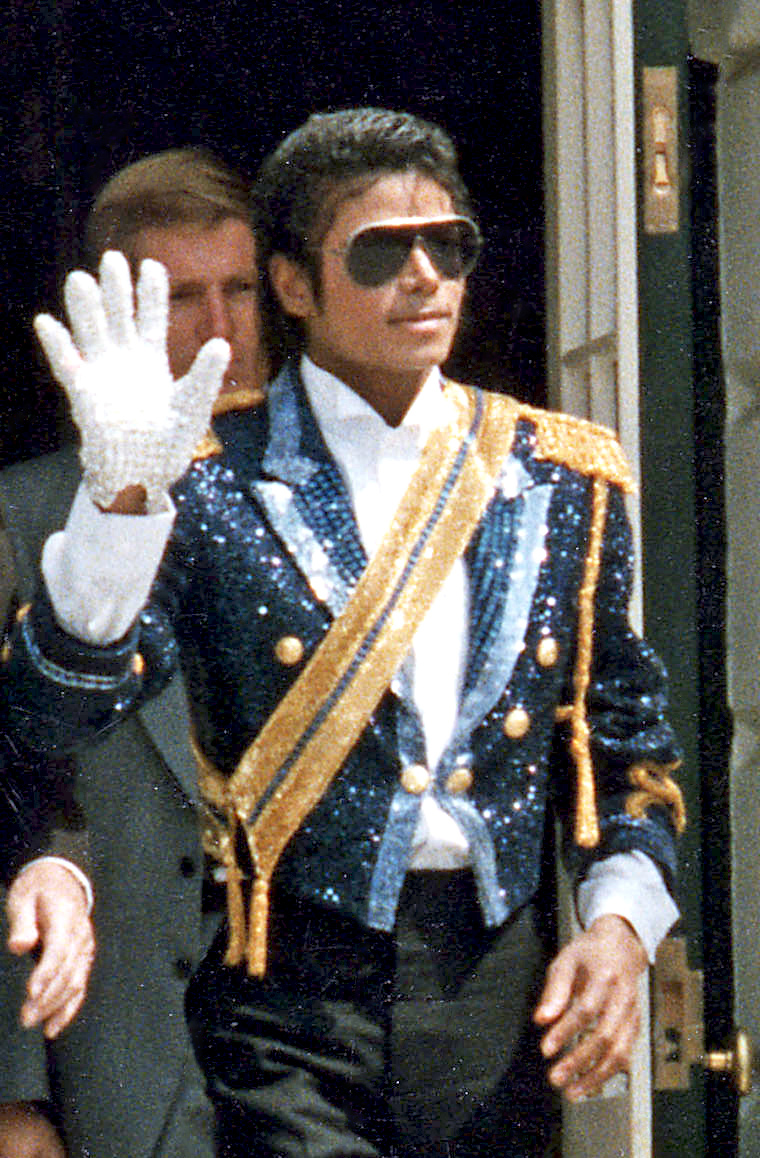
Michael Jackson's Thriller was the best-selling album for two years in a row.

Year^{[I]}	Performing artist(s)	Nationality	Album	Ref.
1980	Pink Floyd	United Kingdom	The Wall	
1981	REO Speedwagon	United States	Hi Infidelity	
1982	Asia	United Kingdom	Asia	
1983	Michael Jackson	United States	Thriller	
1984	Michael Jackson	United States	Thriller	
1985	Bruce Springsteen	United States	Born in the U.S.A.	
1986	Whitney Houston	United States	Whitney Houston	
1987	Bon Jovi	United States	Slippery When Wet	
1988	George Michael	United Kingdom	Faith	
1989	Bobby Brown	United States	Don't Be Cruel	

== 1990s ==
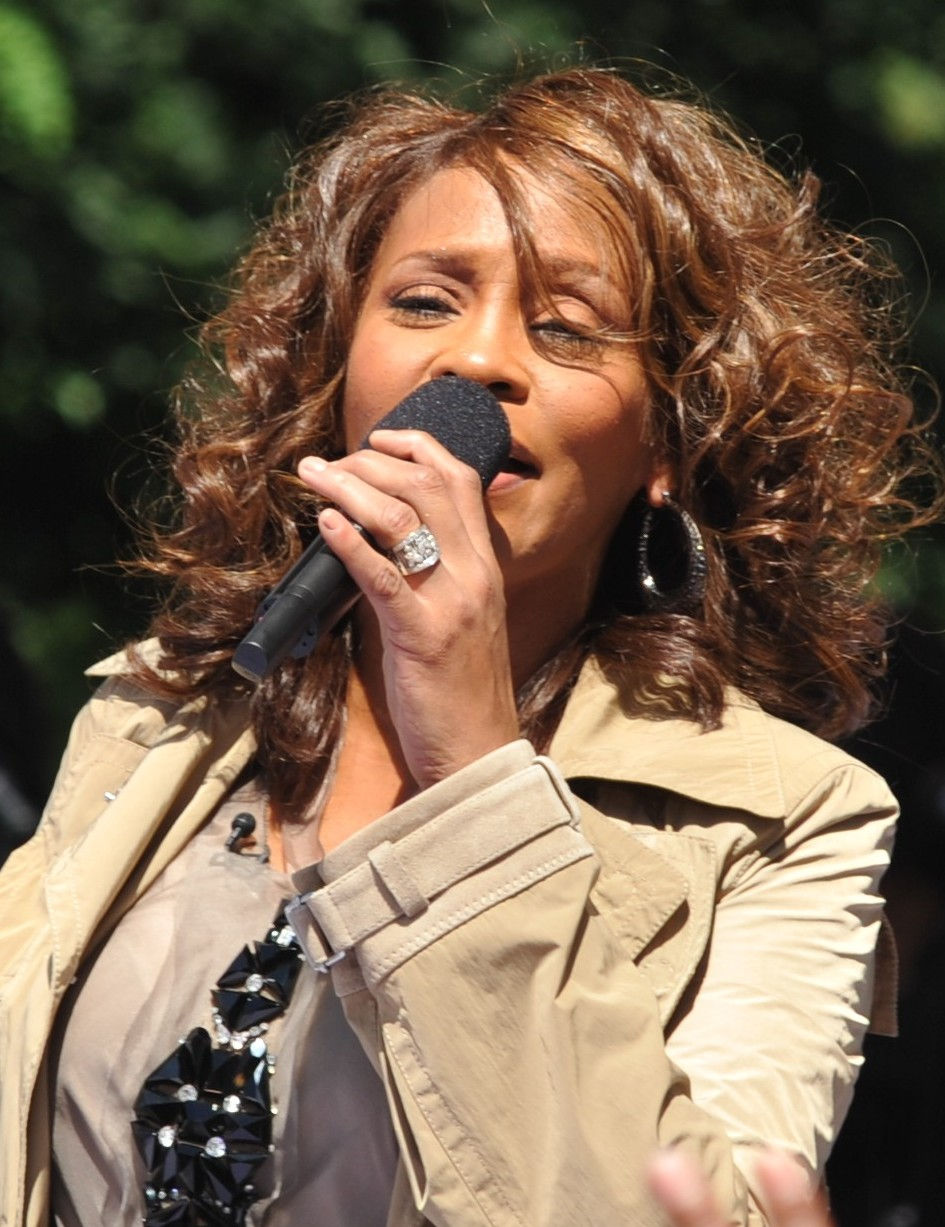
Whitney Houston had the best-selling albums of 1986 and 1993, with her self-titled debut studio album and the soundtrack of The Bodyguard, respectively.

Year^{[I]}	Performing artist(s)	Nationality	Album	Sales	Ref.
1990	Janet Jackson	United States	Janet Jackson's Rhythm Nation 1814	NA (Note: Annual album sales data have been revealed by Billboard since after 1992.)	
1991	Garth Brooks	United States	Ropin' the Wind (Note: Ropin' the Wind was the best-selling album of 1991 according to a 1992 article by the Los Angeles Times.)	4,000,000	
1991	Mariah Carey	United States	Mariah Carey (Note: Mariah Carey was the best-selling album of 1991 according to a 2019 article by The Independent.)	3,380,000	
1992	Billy Ray Cyrus	United States	Some Gave All	4,832,000	
1993	Whitney Houston (Soundtrack)	–	The Bodyguard	5,460,000	
1994	Elton John (Soundtrack)	–	The Lion King	4,934,000	
1995	Hootie & the Blowfish	United States	Cracked Rear View	7,020,000	
1996	Alanis Morissette	Canada	Jagged Little Pill	7,380,000	
1997	Spice Girls	United Kingdom	Spice	5,302,000	
1998	James Horner / Soundtrack	–	Titanic	9,338,000	
1999	Backstreet Boys	United States	Millennium	9,445,732	

== 2000s ==
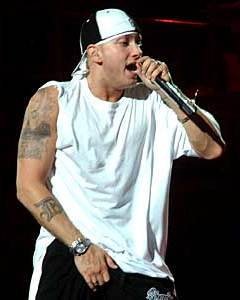
Eminem is the only rapper to have achieved the best-seller of the year twice; The Eminem Show and Recovery were the best-selling albums of 2002 and 2010, respectively.

Year^{[I]}	Performing artist(s)	Nationality	Album	Sales	Ref.
2000	NSYNC	United States	No Strings Attached	9,936,000	
2001	Linkin Park	United States	Hybrid Theory	4,813,000	
2002	Eminem	United States	The Eminem Show	7,608,000	
2003	50 Cent	United States	Get Rich or Die Tryin'	6,536,000	
2004	Usher	United States	Confessions	7,979,000	
2005	Mariah Carey	United States	The Emancipation of Mimi	4,969,000	
2006	Various artists	–	High School Musical	3,719,000	
2007	Josh Groban	United States	Noël	3,699,000	
2008	Lil Wayne	United States	Tha Carter III	2,874,000	
2009	Taylor Swift	United States	Fearless	5,217,000	

== 2010s ==
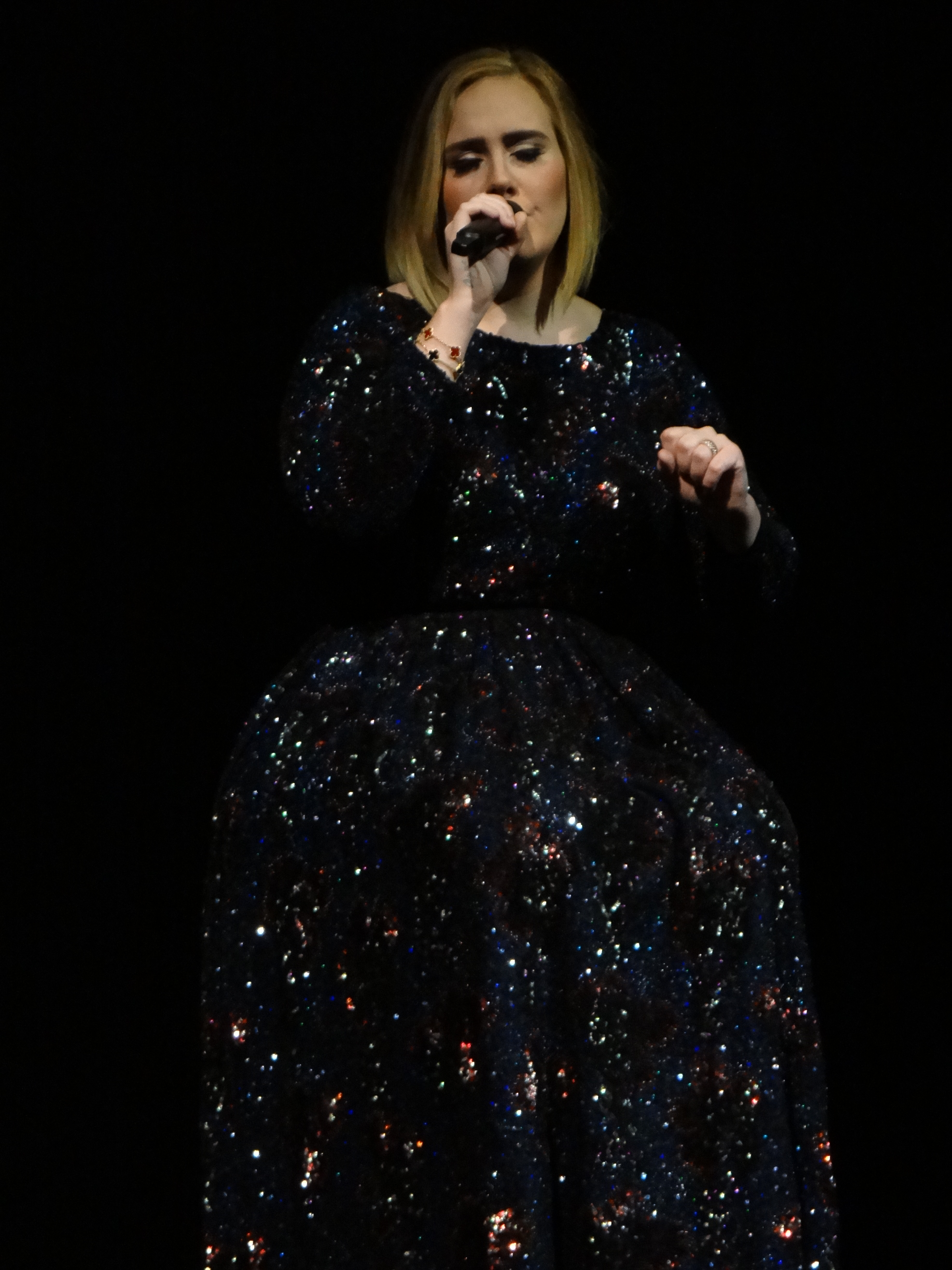
Adele's 21, 25, and 30 were the best-selling albums of 2011-2012, 2015-2016 and 2021, respectively.

Year^{[I]}	Performing artist(s)	Nationality	Album	Sales	Ref.
2010	Eminem	United States	Recovery	3,415,000	
2011	Adele	United Kingdom	21	5,824,000	
2012	Adele	United Kingdom	21	4,410,000	
2013	Justin Timberlake	United States	The 20/20 Experience	2,430,000	
2014	Taylor Swift	United States	1989	5,661,000	
2015	Adele	United Kingdom	25	7,441,000	
2016	Adele	United Kingdom	25	1,731,000	
2017	Taylor Swift	United States	Reputation	2,903,000	
2018	Various artists	–	The Greatest Showman	1,491,000	
2019	Taylor Swift	United States	Lover	2,085,000	

== 2020s ==
Year^{[I]}	Performing artist(s)	Nationality	Album	Sales	Ref.
2020	Taylor Swift	United States	Folklore	3,276,000	
2021	Adele	United Kingdom	30	1,464,000	
2022	Taylor Swift	United States	Midnights	4,818,000	
2023	Taylor Swift	United States	1989 (Taylor's Version)	6,975,000	
2024	Taylor Swift	United States	The Tortured Poets Department	11,491,000	
2025	Taylor Swift	United States	The Life of a Showgirl	6,105,000	

== Notes ==
^{^[I]} Each year is linked to the article about music that year.

- After Billboard began obtaining sales and airplay information from Nielsen SoundScan and Nielsen Broadcast Data Systems, the year-end charts are now calculated by a very straightforward cumulative total of yearlong sales points. This gives a more accurate picture of any given year's most popular titles, as an entry that hypothetically spent nine weeks at number one in March could possibly have earned fewer cumulative points than one spending six weeks at number three in January. Albums at the peak of their popularity at the time of the November/December chart-year cutoff many times end up ranked lower than expected on a year-end tally, yet are ranked on the following year's chart as well, as their cumulative points are split between the two chart years. Sometimes, the best-selling album of the year by Billboard is different than best-selling album of the year of Nielsen SoundScan, because Billboard calculates the year from December to November and Nielsen calculates the year from January to December.
- In this list, from 1956 to 1991, the Billboard year-end tracking was used. From 1992 to date, Nielsen SoundScan's year-end tracking was used.
- Since 2015, Billboard and MRC Data (formerly Nielsen SoundScan) used album-equivalent units to determine the year's top albums, thus there is a discrepancy between the best-selling album (based on pure sales) and the best-performing album (based on sales+streaming). For information regarding the best-selling albums in the MRC Data era (from 1991 to present), see List of best-selling albums in the United States of the Nielsen SoundScan era.

== See also ==
- Best-selling albums in the United States since Nielsen SoundScan tracking began
- Billboard Year-End
- List of best-selling albums
- List of best-selling albums in Argentina
- List of best-selling albums in Australia
- List of best-selling albums in Brazil
- List of best-selling albums in Canada
- List of best-selling albums in France
- List of best-selling albums in Germany
- List of best-selling albums in Japan
- List of best-selling albums in the Philippines
- List of best-selling albums in South Korea
- List of best-selling albums in Taiwan
- List of best-selling albums in the United Kingdom
