= List of best-selling albums in Canada =

This is a list of the best-selling albums in Canada that have been certified by Music Canada, formerly known as Canadian Recording Industry Association (CRIA).

== Album certifications ==
Music Canada provides "certifications" for album sales, similar to the RIAA's. The certification levels for albums released after May 1, 2008, are:

- Gold: 40,000 units (previously 50,000)
- Platinum: 80,000 units (previously 100,000)
- Diamond: 800,000 units (previously 1,000,000)

Note: Multi-Platinum certification refers to albums that have sold 160,000 units or more (i.e. 160,000 is double Platinum) but have not yet sold 800,000 units (Diamond certification).

== Best-selling albums in Canada ==
Highest certifications (listed by date of certification)
Date of certification	Year	Title	Artist	Certification	Shipments/certified sales
May 11, 2022	1982	Thriller	Michael Jackson	3× Diamond	3,000,000^{‡}
November 12, 1996	1995	Jagged Little Pill	Alanis Morissette	2× Diamond	2,000,000
July 30, 1987	1976	Their Greatest Hits (1971–1975)	Eagles	2× Diamond	2,000,000
June 27, 1995	1977	Rumours	Fleetwood Mac	2× Diamond	2,000,000
June 28, 1995	1971	Led Zeppelin IV	Led Zeppelin	2× Diamond	2,000,000
August 31, 1995	1977	Bat Out of Hell	Meat Loaf	2× Diamond	2,000,000
August 31, 1995	1979	The Wall	Pink Floyd	2× Diamond	2,000,000
April 9, 1999	1995	The Woman in Me	Shania Twain	2× Diamond	2,000,000
January 21, 2000	1997	Come On Over	Shania Twain	2× Diamond	2,000,000
March 14, 2003	1973	The Dark Side of the Moon	Pink Floyd	2× Diamond	2,000,000
December 21, 2004	2002	Up!	Shania Twain	2× Diamond	2,000,000
September 20, 2018	2011	21	Adele	2× Diamond	1,600,000^{‡}

Since Nielsen SoundScan tracking began (1995–present)
Rank	Year	Title	Artist	Certification	Unit sales
1	1997	Come On Over	Shania Twain	2× Diamond	1,948,000
2	1997	Let's Talk About Love	Celine Dion	Diamond	1,492,000
3	2011	21	Adele	2× Diamond^{‡}	1,489,000
4	1997	Big Shiny Tunes 2	Various Artists	Diamond	1,233,000
5	2000	1	The Beatles	Diamond	1,231,000
6	2002	Up!	Shania Twain	2× Diamond	1,134,000
7	1997	Romanza	Andrea Bocelli	Diamond	1,133,000
8	2015	25	Adele	Diamond	1,093,000
8	1997	Aquarium	Aqua	Diamond	1,093,000
9	1997	Surfacing	Sarah McLachlan	Diamond	1,078,000
10	1999	Millennium	Backstreet Boys	Diamond	1,075,000
11	1997	Backstreet's Back	Backstreet Boys	Diamond	1,048,000

Claimed sales
Year	Title	Artist	Certification	Sales
1982	Thriller	Michael Jackson	3× Diamond^{‡}	2,400,000
1997	Let's Talk About Love	Celine Dion	Diamond	1,700,000
1996	Falling into You	Celine Dion	Diamond	1,600,000
1978	Breakfast in America	Supertramp	Diamond	1,500,000
1993	The Colour of My Love	Celine Dion	Diamond	1,500,000
1985	No Jacket Required	Phil Collins	Diamond	1,300,000
1978	Saturday Night Fever (soundtrack)	Various artists	Diamond	1,300,000
1994	The Lion King (1994 soundtrack)	Various artists	Diamond	1,200,000
1978	Grease: The Original Soundtrack from the Motion Picture	Various artists	Diamond	1,115,000

== Best-selling albums by year ==
=== 2000-2022 ===
Year	Performing artist(s)	Nationality	Album	Sales	Ref.
2000	Eminem	United States	The Marshall Mathers LP	679,567	
2001	Shaggy	Jamaica	Hot Shot	587,960	
2002	Shania Twain	Canada	Up!	580,000	
2004	Shania Twain	Canada	Greatest Hits	483,000	
2005	Green Day	United States	American Idiot	495,433	
2006	James Blunt	United Kingdom	Back to Bedlam	456,281	
2007	Josh Groban	United States	Noël	380,000	
2008	AC/DC	Australia	Black Ice	341,000	
2009	Susan Boyle	Scotland	I Dreamed a Dream	319,000	
2010	Eminem	United States	Recovery	435,000	
2011	Adele	United Kingdom	21	850,000	
2012	Adele	United Kingdom	21	457,000	
2013	Eminem	United States	The Marshall Mathers LP 2	242,000	
2014	Taylor Swift	United States	1989	314,000	
2015	Adele	United Kingdom	25	860,000	
2016	Drake	Canada	Views	196,000	
2017	Ed Sheeran	United Kingdom	÷	200,000	
2018	Lady Gaga & Bradley Cooper	United States	A Star Is Born	92,000	
2019	Celine Dion	Canada	Courage	83,000	
2020	Taylor Swift	United States	Folklore	62,000	
2021	Adele	United Kingdom	30	114,000	
2022	Taylor Swift	United States	Midnights	64,000	

== See also ==
- The Top 100 Canadian Albums
- List of diamond-certified albums in Canada
- List of number-one singles in Canada

== Notes ==
- ^{‡}Certification include on-demand audio and video streams and track sale equivalent
