= List of best-selling albums in the United States of the Nielsen SoundScan era =

List of best-selling albums in the United States since 1991

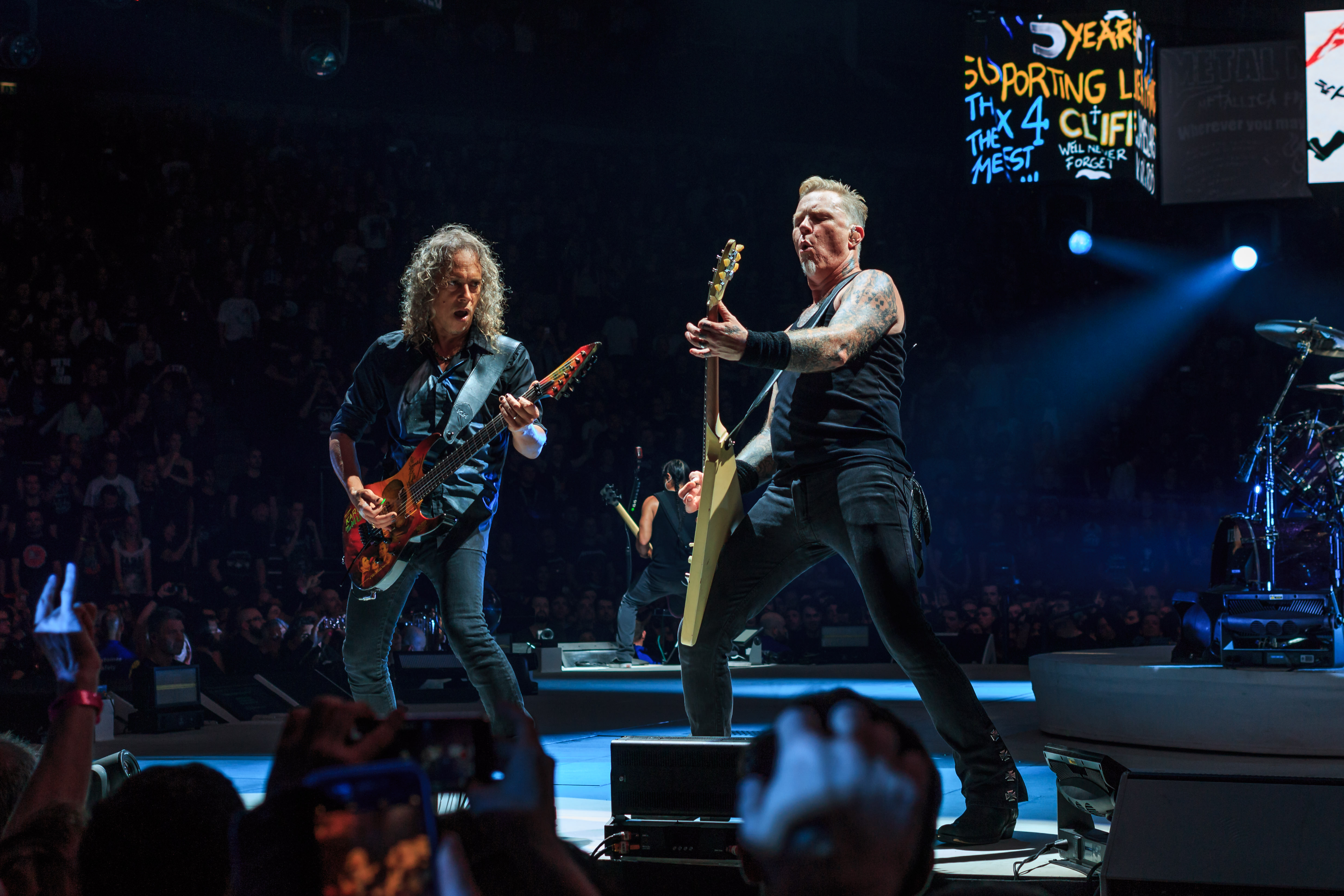
Metallica's self-titled album is the highest selling record under Nielsen SoundScan, selling over 17 million copies

This is a list of best-selling albums in the United States of the Nielsen SoundScan era. SoundScan began tracking sales data for Billboard on March 1, 1991. SoundScan data is unrelated to the Recording Industry Association of America (RIAA) certifications, and is based on actual sales while the RIAA's certification process is based on shipments.

== Best-sellers (overall) ==
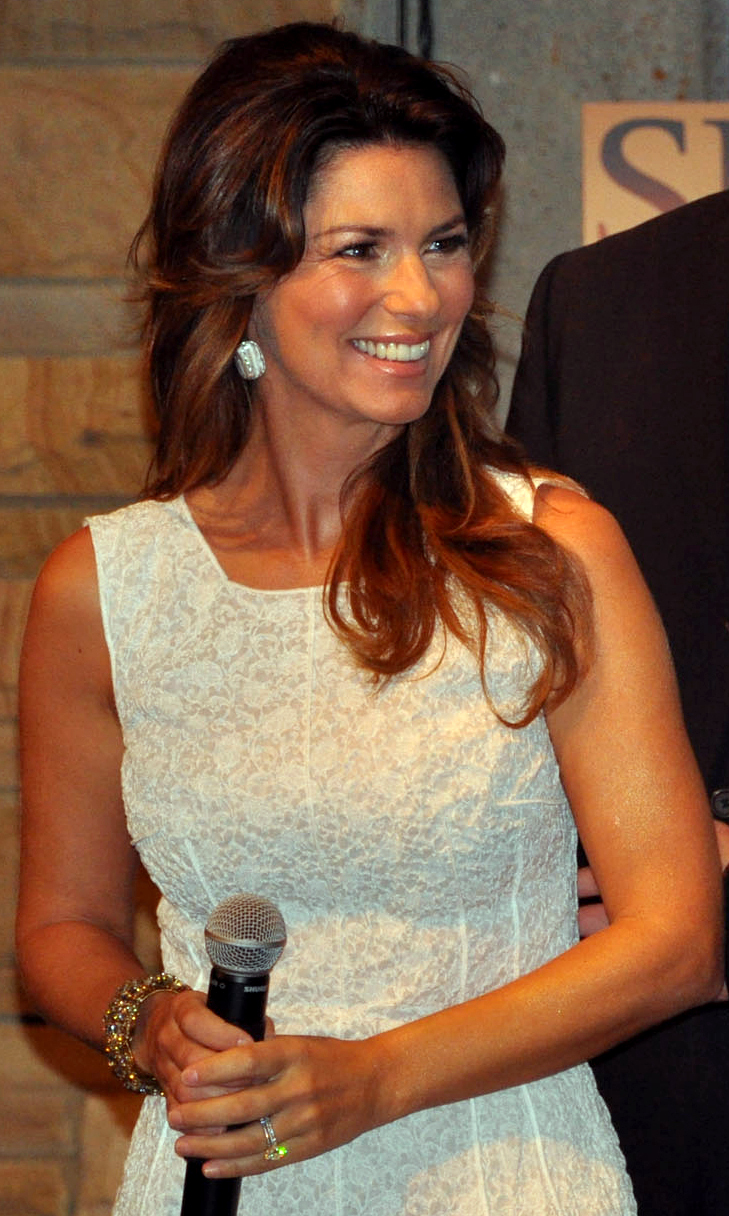
Shania Twain's Come On Over (released in 1997) has sold over 15.7 million copies.

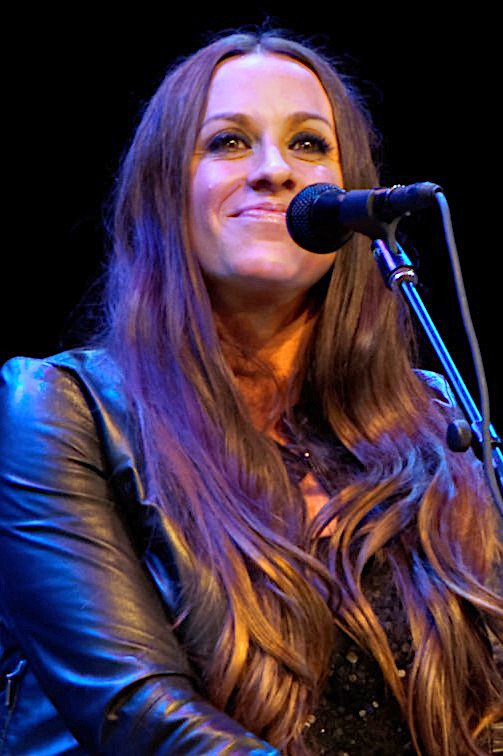
Alanis Morissette's Jagged Little Pill (released in 1995) has sold over 15.3 million copies.

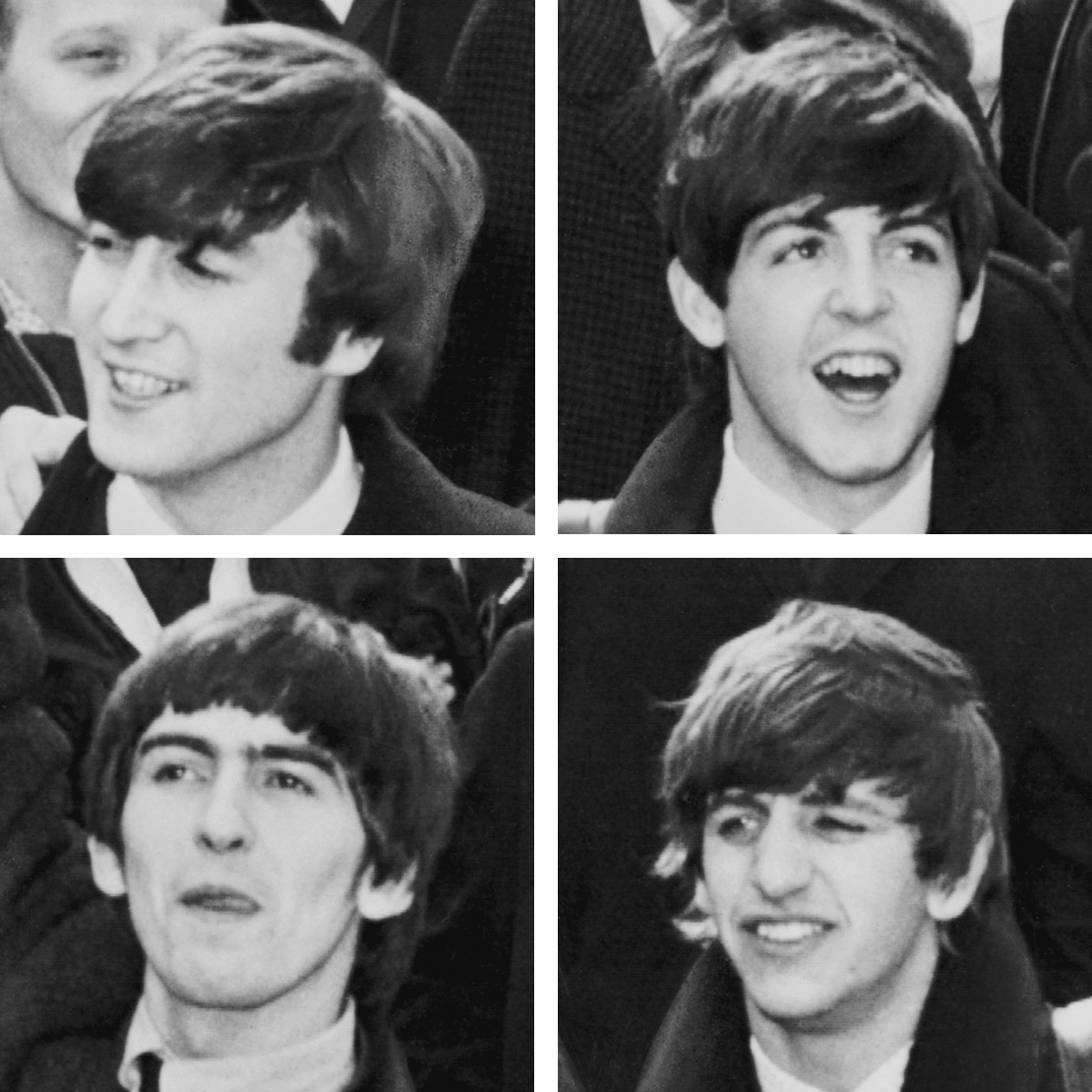
The Beatles' 1 (released in 2000) has sold over 13 million copies.

List of the best-selling albums in the United States since 1991, showing title, release year, artist, and sales figure
Album	Release year	Artist(s)	Pure sales figures	Ref.
Metallica	1991	Metallica	17,810,000	
Come On Over	1997	Shania Twain	15,730,000	
Jagged Little Pill	1995	Alanis Morissette	15,200,000	
1	2000	The Beatles	13,000,000	
Legend	1984	Bob Marley and the Wailers	12,300,000	
Millennium	1999	Backstreet Boys	12,300,000 (Note: Millennium sold an additional 1.59 million copies through BMG Music Club. Nielsen SoundScan does not count albums sold through CD clubs, which were significantly popular in the 1990s.)	
The Bodyguard	1992	Whitney Houston	12,140,000	
21	2011	Adele	12,100,000	
Supernatural	1999	Santana	11,850,000	
Human Clay	1999	Creed	11,700,000	
The Marshall Mathers LP	2000	Eminem	11,400,000	
No Strings Attached	2000	NSYNC	11,160,000 (Note: No Strings Attached sold an additional 1.52 million copies through BMG Music Club. Nielsen SoundScan does not count albums sold through CD clubs, which were significantly popular in the 1990s..)	
Hybrid Theory	2000	Linkin Park	11,130,000	
Come Away with Me	2002	Norah Jones	11,100,000	
Falling into You	1996	Celine Dion	10,900,000	
Ten	1991	Pearl Jam	10,790,000	
...Baby One More Time	1999	Britney Spears	10,700,000 (Note: ...Baby One More Time sold an additional 1.6 million copies through BMG Music Club. Nielsen SoundScan does not count albums sold through CD clubs, which were significantly popular in the 1990s..)	
The Eminem Show	2002	Eminem	10,700,000	
Nevermind	1991	Nirvana	10,400,000 (Note: Nevermind sold an additional 1.24 million copies through BMG Music Club. Nielsen SoundScan does not count albums sold through CD clubs, which were significantly popular in the 1990s.)	
Confessions	2004	Usher	10,300,000	
Cracked Rear View	1994	Hootie & the Blowfish	10,270,000 (Note: Cracked Rear View sold an additional 3 million copies through CD clubs. Nielsen SoundScan does not count albums sold through CD clubs, which were significantly popular in the 1990s.)	
Titanic	1997	James Horner	10,175,000	
Backstreet Boys	1997	Backstreet Boys	10,120,000 (Note: Backstreet Boys sold an additional 1.72 million copies through BMG Music Club. Nielsen SoundScan does not count albums sold through CD clubs, which were significantly popular in the 1990s.)	

== Best-selling albums by decade ==
=== 1991–1999 ===
Best-selling albums in the United States in the 1990s
Album	Release year	Artist(s)	Sales
Jagged Little Pill	1995	Alanis Morissette	13,542,393
Come On Over	1997	Shania Twain	12,110,660
Metallica	1991	Metallica	11,715,533
The Bodyguard	1992	Whitney Houston	11,605,690
Falling into You	1996	Celine Dion	10,224,282
Cracked Rear View	1994	Hootie & the Blowfish	9,817,666
Titanic	1997	James Horner	9,806,175
Human Clay	1999	Creed	9,495,000
Millennium	1999	Backstreet Boys	9,445,732
Ropin' the Wind	1991	Garth Brooks	9,370,863
Backstreet Boys	1997	Backstreet Boys	9,258,265

=== 2000–2009 ===
Best-selling albums in the United States in the 2000s
Album	Release year	Artist(s)	Sales
1	2000	The Beatles	11,564,000
No Strings Attached	2000	NSYNC	11,113,000
The Marshall Mathers LP	2000	Eminem	11,100,000
The Eminem Show	2002	Eminem	10,900,000
Come Away With Me	2002	Norah Jones	10,579,000
Confessions	2004	Usher	9,730,000
Hybrid Theory	2000	Linkin Park	9,697,000
Oops!... I Did It Again	2000	Britney Spears	9,184,000
Country Grammar	2000	Nelly	8,464,000

=== 2010–2019 ===
Best-selling albums in the United States in the 2010s
Album	Release year	Artist(s)	Sales
21	2011	Adele	12,009,000
25	2015	Adele	9,517,000
1989	2014	Taylor Swift	6,215,000
Recovery	2010	Eminem	4,867,000
Speak Now	2010	Taylor Swift	4,694,000
Red	2012	Taylor Swift	4,465,000
Christmas	2011	Michael Bublé	4,379,000
Frozen	2014	Various artists	4,314,000
Need You Now	2010	Lady Antebellum	4,221,000
The 20/20 Experience	2013	Justin Timberlake	3,743,000

== Best-selling albums by year ==
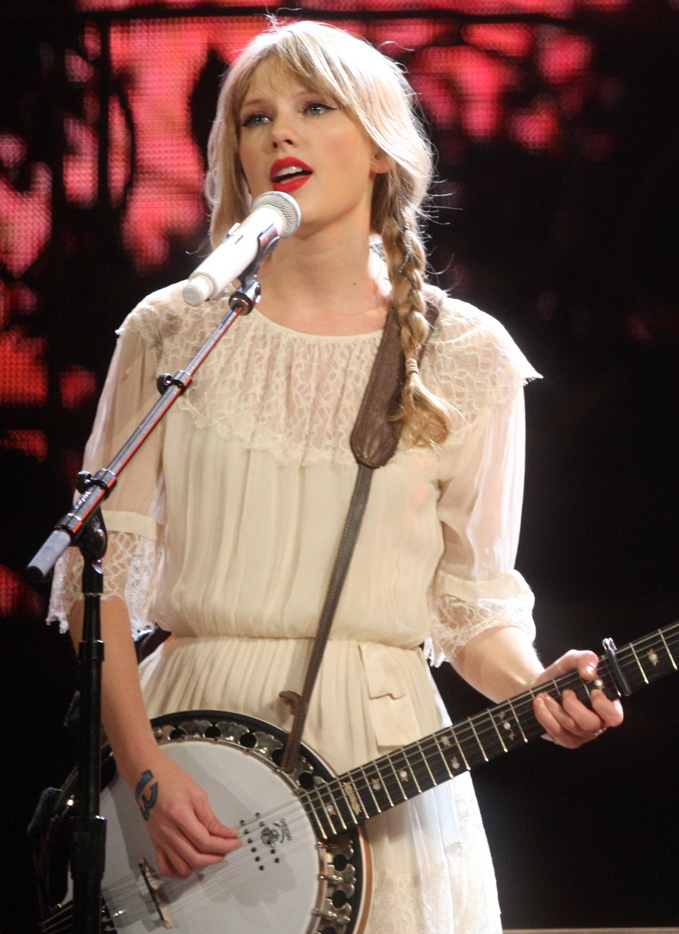
Taylor Swift is the first artist to have the annual best seller nine times (2009, 2014, 2017, 2019, 2020, 2022, 2023, 2024, 2025).

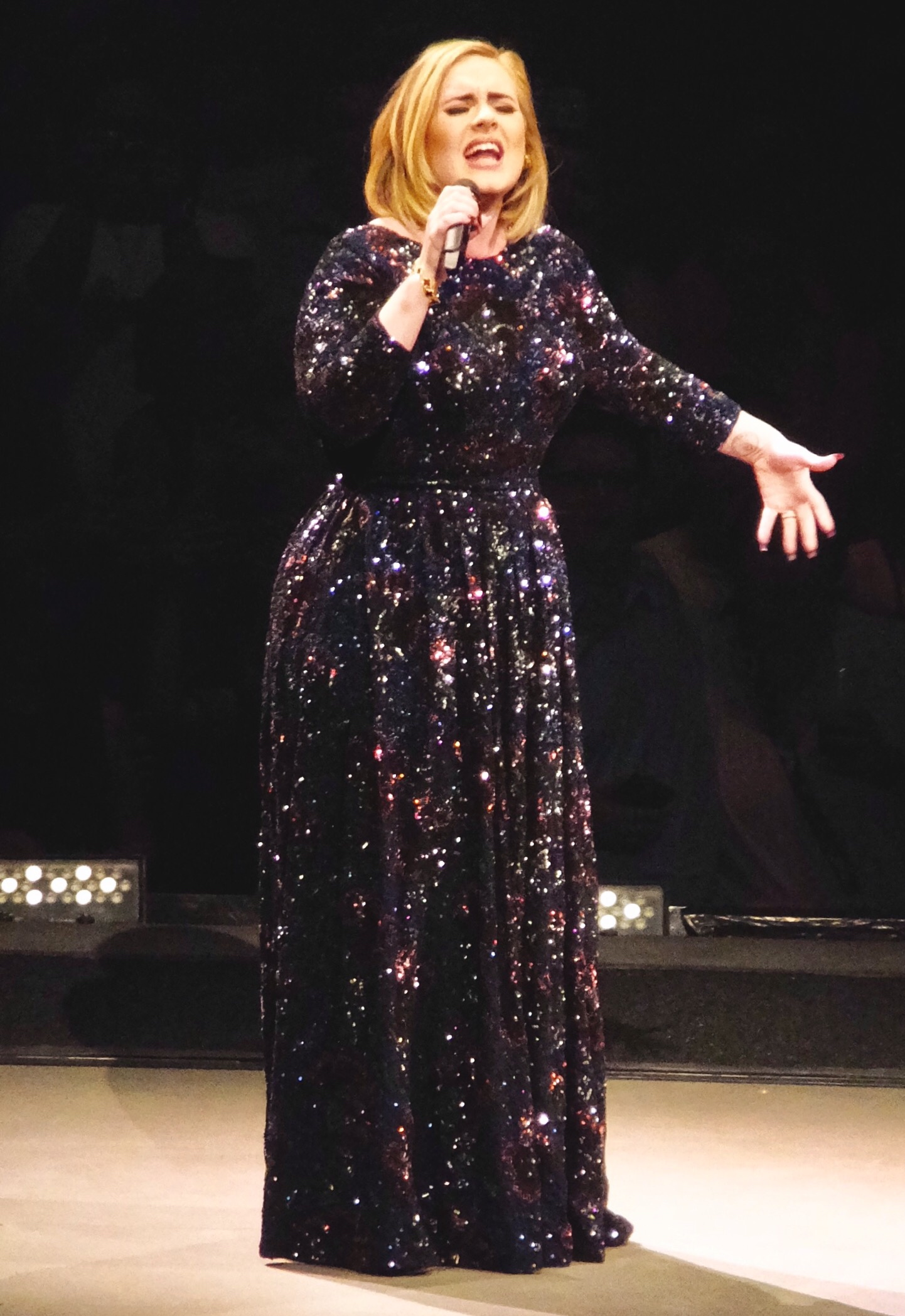
Adele has the annual best seller five times (2011, 2012, 2015, 2016, 2021).

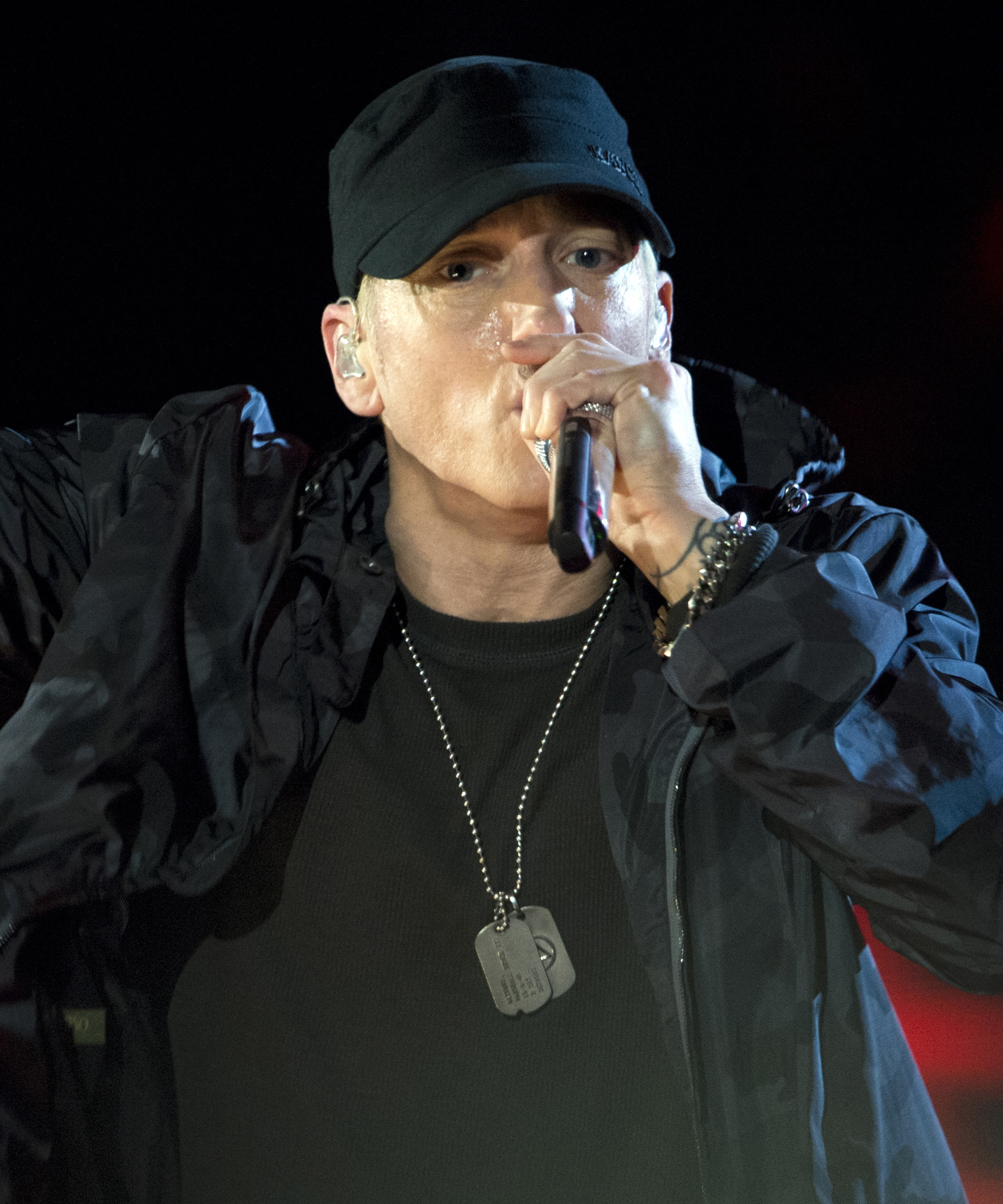
Eminem has the best-selling album of a calendar year twice (2002 and 2010).

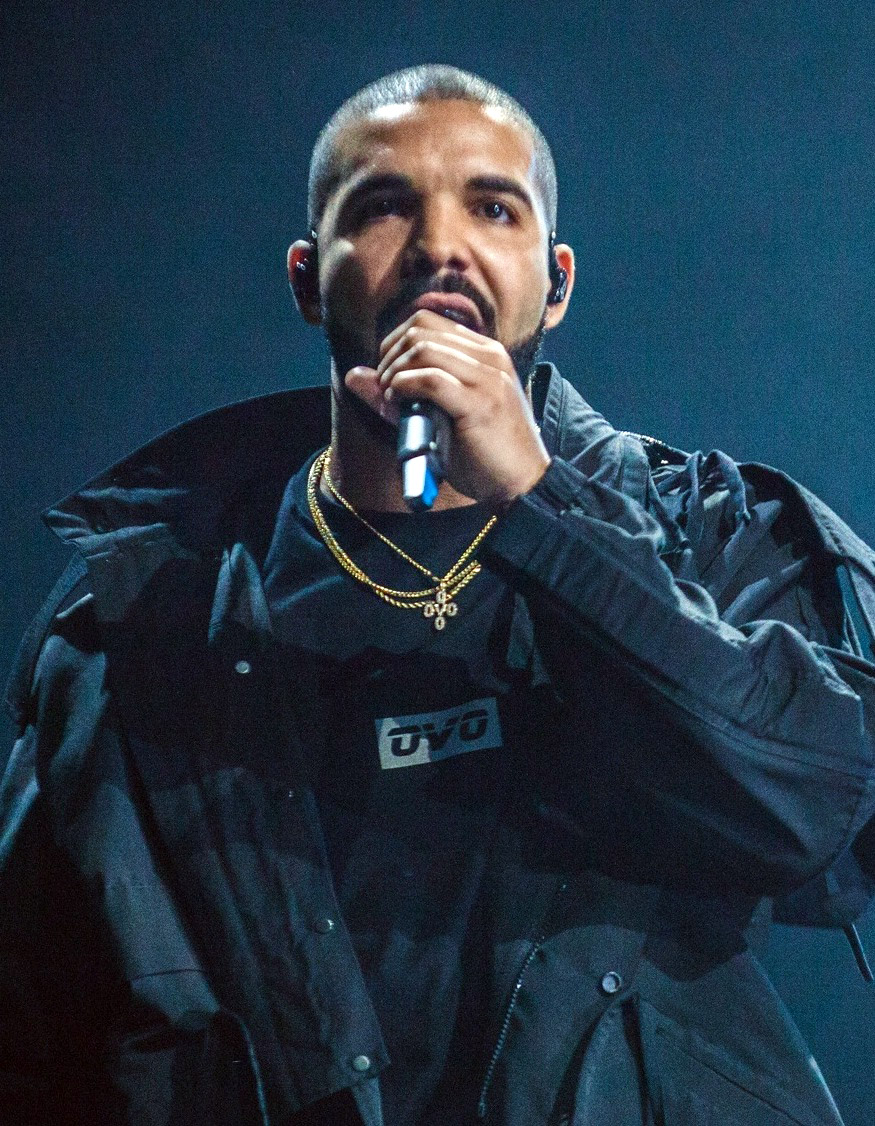
Drake has the year's top-consumed album (based on album-equivalent units) twice (2016 and 2018).

The following list includes the annual best-selling albums since 1991, as reported by MRC Data (formerly Nielsen SoundScan). For albums released after 2015, the best-performing album of the year is determined by album-equivalent units consisted of album sales, digital songs sales, and on-demand streaming, while the best-selling album is determined by album sales only.

Key
†	Indicates album-equivalent units

Best-selling albums by year in the United States since 1991
Year	Album	Artist(s)	Figures	Ref.
1991	Mariah Carey	Mariah Carey	4,885,000	
1992	Some Gave All	Billy Ray Cyrus	4,700,000	
1993	The Bodyguard	Whitney Houston	5,460,000	
1994	The Lion King	Various Artists	4,900,000	
1995	Cracked Rear View	Hootie & the Blowfish	7,000,000	
1996	Jagged Little Pill	Alanis Morissette	7,400,000	
1997	Spice	Spice Girls	5,300,000	
1998	Titanic	James Horner	9,338,061	
1999	Millennium	Backstreet Boys	9,445,732	
2000	No Strings Attached	NSYNC	9,936,104	
2001	Hybrid Theory	Linkin Park	4,812,852	
2002	The Eminem Show	Eminem	7,607,925	
2003	Get Rich or Die Tryin'	50 Cent	6,535,809	
2004	Confessions	Usher	7,978,594	
2005	The Emancipation of Mimi	Mariah Carey	4,968,606	
2006	High School Musical	Various Artists	3,719,071	
2007	Noël	Josh Groban	3,698,934	
2008	Tha Carter III	Lil Wayne	2,874,420	
2009	Fearless	Taylor Swift	3,216,988	
2010	Recovery	Eminem	3,414,927	
2011	21	Adele	5,823,628	
2012	21	Adele	4,414,000	
2013	The 20/20 Experience	Justin Timberlake	2,427,000	
2014	1989	Taylor Swift	3,661,000	
2015	25	Adele	8,008,000†	
2015	25	Adele	7,441,000	
2016	Views	Drake	4,140,000†	
2016	25	Adele	1,731,000	
2017	÷	Ed Sheeran	2,764,000†	
2017	Reputation	Taylor Swift	1,903,000	
2018	Scorpion	Drake	3,905,000†	
2018	The Greatest Showman	Various Artists	1,491,000	
2019	Hollywood's Bleeding	Post Malone	3,001,000†	
2019	Lover	Taylor Swift	1,085,000	
2020	My Turn	Lil Baby	2,632,000†	
2020	Folklore	Taylor Swift	1,276,000	
2021	Dangerous: The Double Album	Morgan Wallen	3,226,000†	
2021	30	Adele	1,464,000	
2022	Un Verano Sin Ti	Bad Bunny	3,400,000†	
2022	Midnights	Taylor Swift	1,818,000	
2023	One Thing at a Time	Morgan Wallen	5,362,000 †	
2023	1989 (Taylor's Version)	Taylor Swift	1,975,000	
2024	The Tortured Poets Department	Taylor Swift	6,955,000 †	
2024	The Tortured Poets Department	Taylor Swift	3,491,000	
2025	The Life of a Showgirl	Taylor Swift	5,607,000 †	
2025	The Life of a Showgirl	Taylor Swift	3,985,000	

== Single week best-sellers ==
The first album in the SoundScan era to sell a million copies or more in a week is the soundtrack of The Bodyguard by Whitney Houston in 1992; the most recent album to do so is The Life of a Showgirl by Taylor Swift in 2025. The following is a list of all of the albums that sold at least one million copies in a single week:

Key
†	Indicates album-equivalent units

Week ending	Title	Artist	Total units	Pure sales	Week #	Reference
October 9, 2025	The Life of a Showgirl	Taylor Swift	4,002,000†	3,479,500	1st	
November 26, 2015	25	Adele	3,474,000†	3,378,000	1st	
April 25, 2024	The Tortured Poets Department	Taylor Swift	2,610,000†	1,914,000	1st	
March 26, 2000	No Strings Attached	*NSYNC	2,416,000		1st	
July 29, 2001	Celebrity	*NSYNC	1,880,000		1st	
May 28, 2000	The Marshall Mathers LP	Eminem	1,760,000		1st	
November 9, 2023	1989 (Taylor's Version)	Taylor Swift	1,653,000†	1,359,000	1st	
November 26, 2000	Black & Blue	Backstreet Boys	1,591,000		1st	
October 27, 2022	Midnights	Taylor Swift	1,578,000†	1,140,000	1st	
June 2, 2002	The Eminem Show	Eminem	1,322,000		2nd (Note: Following an abbreviated single-day first week.)	
May 21, 2000	Oops!... I Did It Again	Britney Spears	1,319,000		1st	
November 2, 2014	1989	Taylor Swift	1,287,000		1st	
December 24, 2000	1	The Beatles	1,259,000		6th	
November 16, 2017	Reputation	Taylor Swift	1,238,000†	1,216,000	1st	
October 28, 2012	Red	Taylor Swift	1,208,000		1st	
December 24, 2015	25	Adele	1,190,000†	1,160,000	5th	
December 3, 2015	25	Adele	1,160,000†	1,110,000	2nd	
March 6, 2005	The Massacre	50 Cent	1,141,000		1st (Note: Abbreviated sales week of four days.)	
May 23, 1999	Millennium	Backstreet Boys	1,134,000		1st	
May 29, 2011	Born This Way	Lady Gaga	1,108,000 (Note: Of the 1.1 million copies sold of Born This Way in its first week, 440,000 units were digital albums sold by Amazon for 99 cents. In response, SoundScan instituted a policy of only including sales priced over $3.49 during an album's first four weeks, but the first week sales for Born This Way stand as they came before the rule change.)		1st	
March 28, 2004	Confessions	Usher	1,096,000		1st	
November 22, 1998	Double Live	Garth Brooks	1,095,000		1st	
December 28, 1992	The Bodyguard	Soundtrack/Whitney Houston	1,061,000		6th	
October 22, 2000	Chocolate Starfish and the Hot Dog Flavored Water	Limp Bizkit	1,055,000		1st	
October 31, 2010	Speak Now	Taylor Swift	1,047,000		1st	
May 22, 2016	Views	Drake	1,040,000†	852,000	1st	
February 17, 2004	Feels Like Home	Norah Jones	1,022,000		1st	
June 21, 2008	Tha Carter III	Lil Wayne	1,006,000		1st	

== See also ==
- Album era
- List of best-selling albums in the United States
- List of best-selling albums by year in the United States
