= An Evening with Adele =

2008–09 concert tour by Adele

- Debut tour by Adele
- Promotional poster for the tour
- Location: Europe • North America
- Associated album: 19
- Start date: 27 January 2008
- End date: 12 July 2009
- Legs: 9
- No. of shows: 30 in Europe; 48 in North America; 78 in total
- Attendance: 66,825

Adele concert chronology
- An Evening with Adele (2008–09); Adele Live (2011)

An Evening with Adele was the debut concert tour by English singer-songwriter Adele, in support of her debut studio album, 19. The tour was unusual in that it included very few dates in the United Kingdom, Adele's home country and the region where 19 was the most successful. Instead, the tour focused heavily on North America.

In 2008, Adele canceled her tour dates in Germany, Japan, and the United States. The cancellation was reported to be due to family issues. She explained she would honor commitments she made in New York before returning to the UK. In a blog post to her fans, she wrote the following: "There's some problems at home... and, at the moment, there (sic) stopping me from being away for any long period of time. I was really looking forward to touring again and throwing myself back into it all. But my home life needs more attention right now. "I apologise from the bottom of my heart for disappointing you all, I'm truly gutted!

One of the last performances on the tour took place at the historic Hollywood Bowl in Los Angeles, California. Etta James was originally supposed to appear at the performance, but cancelled at the last minute due to illness and was replaced by Chaka Khan. In July 2009, the tour ended at the North Sea Jazz Festival in Rotterdam, Netherlands.

== Opening acts ==
- The Script (North America, early 2009)
- James Morrison (North America, January 2009)
- Sam Sparro (United Kingdom, mid-2008)
- Jenny Lindfors (Ireland, mid-2008)

== Setlist ==
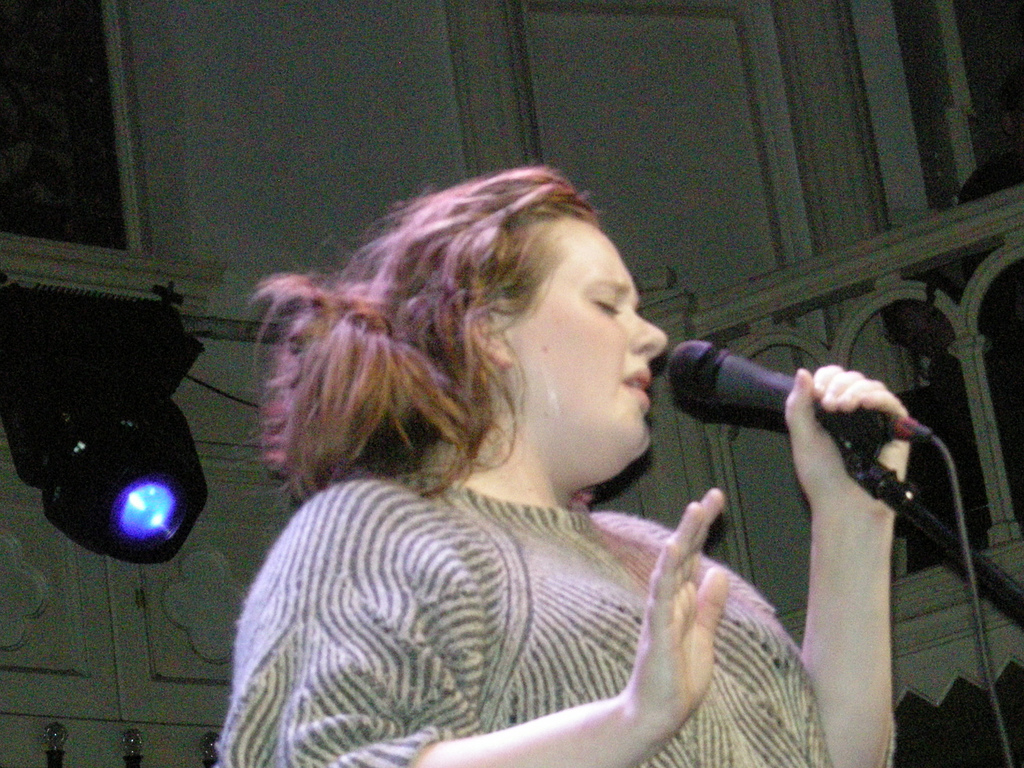
Adele performing at Paradiso during the tour in 2008.

1. "Cold Shoulder"
2. "Melt My Heart to Stone"
3. "Daydreamer"
4. "Best for Last"
5. "Right as Rain"
6. "Many Shades of Black"
7. "First Love"
8. "Tired"
9. "Make You Feel My Love"
10. "Fool That I Am"
11. "Hometown Glory"

Encore

12. "Crazy for You"
13. "That's It, I Quit, I'm Movin' On"
14. "Chasing Pavements"

== Tour dates ==
Date	City	Country	Venue
Europe
27 January 2008	Manchester	England	Royal Northern College of Music
29 January 2008	London	England	Bloomsbury Theatre
2 February 2008	Glasgow	Scotland	Classic Grand
3 February 2008	Birmingham	England	The Glee Club
2 March 2008	Dublin	Ireland	Crawdaddy
4 March 2008	Brussels	Belgium	Ancienne Belgique
6 March 2008	Hamburg	Germany	Stage Club
North America
12 March 2008	Austin	United States	Austin Music Hall
13 March 2008	Austin	United States	Austin Music Hall
17 March 2008	New York City	United States	Joe's Pub
18 March 2008	New York City	United States	Joe's Pub
20 March 2008	Los Angeles	United States	Hotel Café
25 March 2008	Montreal	Canada	Just for Laughs Museum
27 March 2008	Toronto	Canada	The Rivoli
Europe
23 April 2008	Cardiff	Wales	St David's Hall
24 April 2008	Newcastle	England	Journal Tyne Theatre
26 April 2008	Edinburgh	Scotland	Queen's Hall
28 April 2008	York	England	Grand Opera House
30 April 2008	Salford	England	Lyric Theatre
1 May 2008	Cambridge	England	Cambridge Corn Exchange
3 May 2008	Southampton	England	Southampton Guildhall
4 May 2008	Birmingham	England	New Alexandra Theatre
6 May 2008	London	England	Shepherd's Bush Empire
7 May 2008	London	England	Shepherd's Bush Empire
10 May 2008	Maidstone	England	Mote Park
16 May 2008	Dublin	Ireland	Vicar Street
North America
21 May 2008	West Hollywood	United States	Roxy Theatre
23 May 2008	San Francisco	United States	Bimbo's 365 Club
26 May 2008	Vancouver	Canada	Red Room
27 May 2008	Seattle	United States	The Triple Door
29 May 2008	Portland	United States	Mission Theater
31 May 2008	Chicago	United States	Martyr's
2 June 2008	Minneapolis	United States	Theatre de la Jeune Lune
6 June 2008	Toronto	Canada	Queen Elizabeth Theatre
7 June 2008	Montreal	Canada	Outremont Theatre
11 June 2008	New York City	United States	Highline Ballroom
12 June 2008	New York City	United States	Highline Ballroom
14 June 2008^{[A]}	Manchester	United States	Great Stage Park
16 June 2008	Philadelphia	United States	World Cafe Live
18 June 2008	Washington, D.C.	United States	Sixth & I Historic Synagogue
22 June 2008	Boulder	United States	Fox Theatre
Europe
28 June 2008	Paris	France	La Cigale
11 July 2008	Berlin	Germany	Postbahnhof
13 July 2008^{[B]}	Montreux	Switzerland	Miles Davis Hall
14 July 2008	Amsterdam	Netherlands	Paradiso
20 July 2008^{[C]}	London	England	Somerset House
25 July 2008	London	England	Bush Hall
12 November 2008^{[D]}	London	England	Union Chapel
21 December 2008^{[E]}	London	England	The Roundhouse
North America
14 January 2009	Somerville	United States	Somerville Theatre
16 January 2009	Philadelphia	United States	Theatre of Living Arts
17 January 2009	Washington, D.C.	United States	9:30 Club
19 January 2009	Chicago	United States	Park West
20 January 2009	Saint Paul	United States	Fitzgerald Theater
22 January 2009	Denver	United States	Bluebird Theater
23 January 2009	Murray	United States	Murray Theatre
26 January 2009	Seattle	United States	Neumos
27 January 2009	Portland	United States	Wonder Ballroom
29 January 2009	San Francisco	United States	Warfield Theatre
30 January 2009	Los Angeles	United States	Wiltern Theatre
10 March 2009	San Diego	United States	House of Blues
11 March 2009	Scottsdale	United States	Martini Ranch
13 March 2009	Austin	United States	La Zona Rosa
14 March 2009	Houston	United States	Warehouse Live
15 March 2009	Houston	United States	Warehouse Live
16 March 2009	Dallas	United States	Granada Theatre
17 March 2009	Atlanta	United States	Variety Playhouse
18 March 2009	Atlanta	United States	Variety Playhouse
19 March 2009	Nashville	United States	Mercy Lounge
21 March 2009	Detroit	United States	Saint Andrew's Hall
22 March 2009	Cleveland	United States	House of Blues Cleveland
Europe
17 April 2009	Amsterdam	Netherlands	Heineken Music Hall
19 April 2009	Groningen	Netherlands	De Oosterpoort
North America
29 April 2009	Montreal	Canada	Métropolis
30 April 2009	Toronto	Canada	Massey Hall
2 May 2009	Boston	United States	Orpheum Theatre
4 May 2009	Philadelphia	United States	Electric Factory
5 May 2009	New York City	United States	Roseland Ballroom
28 June 2009	Los Angeles	United States	Hollywood Bowl
Europe
12 July 2009^{[F]}	Rotterdam	Netherlands	Theater Hal 1

Festivals and other miscellaneous performances
^{A} This concert was a part of the 'Bonnaroo Music Festival'
^{B} This concert was a part of the 'Montreux Jazz Festival'
^{C} This concert was a part of the 'Summer Series'
^{D} This concert was a part of the 'Little Noise Sessions'
^{E} This concert was a part of the 'iTunes Festival'
^{F} This concert was a part of the 'North Sea Jazz Festival'

=== Box office score data ===
Venue	City	Tickets sold / available	Gross revenue
Southampton Guildhall	Southampton	1,198 / 1,198 (100%)	$35,544
The Roxy	West Hollywood	547 / 547 (100%)	$8,946
Martyr's	Chicago	320 / 320 (100%)	$4,800
Outremont Theatre	Montreal	521 / 650 (80%)	$11,513
Somerville Theatre	Somerville	899 / 899 (100%)	$16,980
Theatre of Living Arts	Philadelphia	1,000 / 1,000 (100%)	$17,442
9:30 Club	Washington, D.C.	1,200 / 1,200 (100%)	$24,000
Park West	Chicago	1,000 / 1,000 (100%)	$20,000
Warfield Theatre	San Francisco	2,350 / 2,350 (100%)	$52,356
Wiltern Theater	Los Angeles	2,636 / 2,636 (100%)	$54,230
Granada Theatre	Dallas	1,175 / 1,175 (100%)	$20,047
Heineken Music Hall	Amsterdam	5,519 / 5,519 (100%)	$233,641
Metropolis	Montreal	1,499 / 1,500 (99%)	$36,729
Massey Hall	Toronto	2,663 / 2,663 (100%)	$83,504
Orpheum Theatre	Boston	2,491 / 2,822 (88%)	$60,209
Roseland Ballroom	New York City	3,715 / 3,715 (100%)	$105,246
TOTAL		28,733 / 29,194 (98%)	$775,187

== Cancelled shows ==
7 August 2008	2008, Tokyo japan	LIQUIDROOM: Ebisu
9 August 2008	Summer Sonic Festival 2008, Tokyo japan	Chiba Marine Stadium & Makuhari Messe (Chiba)
10 August 2008	Summer Sonic Festival 2008, osaka japan	Maishima

== Broadcasts and recordings ==
The concert at The Roundhouse (a part of the iTunes Festival) was recorded and released as iTunes Live from SoHo.
