= Adele Live =

2011 concert tour by Adele

- Tour by Adele
- Promotional poster for the tour
- Location: Europe • North America
- Associated album: 21
- Start date: 21 March 2011
- End date: 25 September 2011
- Legs: 4
- No. of shows: 31 in Europe; 20 in North America; 51 in total
- Attendance: 111,874
- Box office: $2 million (10 shows)

Adele concert chronology
- An Evening with Adele (2008–09); Adele Live (2011); Adele Live 2016–2017 (2016–17)

Adele Live was the second concert tour by English singer-songwriter Adele. She visited Europe and North America, the tour supporting her second studio album, 21. Adele was backed by a five-piece band and backing singers. The setlist comprised all of her songs from 21, except for "He Won't Go", as well as selected songs from 19. The shows garnered positive critical reviews, many of which emphasised the show's understated, “unplugged” nature, as well as the singer's vocal performance and accessible persona.

Recurring health and vocal problems led to numerous adjustments and postponements to the tour itinerary. The first European leg of the tour was uninterrupted, however. For the first North American leg (which was originally scheduled to begin 12 May 2011 in Washington, D.C. and end on 22 June in Minneapolis), Adele canceled the last nine dates after she was diagnosed with acute laryngitis. These dates were rescheduled with some additional dates and some larger venues. The tour was sold out quickly across North America and Europe, and received positive reviews.

In September 2011, "continuing problems with a serious cold and chest infection" prompted the further postponement of seven additional dates on the second leg of the European stop. However, the tour was resumed on 13 September, and new dates for the missed shows were rescheduled. In October 2011, the singer again cancelled the remaining dates of the second leg of her North American tour—this time due to a vocal hemorrhage that caused internal bleeding near her vocal cords. Adele was forced to cancel the remaining dates of her tour to undergo emergency surgery for the throat hemorrhaging.

== Background ==
Production designer Rob Sinclair wanted the stage to be sparse so the audience would focus on Adele and her voice. The back wall of the stage featured a "distinctive" wall of 96 cone-shaped lampshades using 60-watt household lightbulbs to illuminate them. Each lamp was individually dimmed and the bulbs of each lamp were dipped in a special rubber solution so they wouldn't break. The rest of the show featured moving lights and much white light to focus on Adele at the center of the stage. The moving lights were designed so that they didn't appear to move from the audience's point-of-view and were powered by Jands Vista's next-generation Vista v2 software. The decision to focus on sculpted white light for the stage won "considerable acclaim."

The tour was minimalist in every aspect, from stage design to using each venue's own sound system rather than transporting a tour-specific system. The front-of-house engineer for the tour was Dave McDonald. McDonald carried an Allen & Heath iLive-112 with him during the tour and hooked it up to each venue's sound system with a Cat 5 connector. This allowed the tour to travel light and allowed McDonald to control the mix for each show using each venue's systems. McDonald used plug-ins to replicate the sound of vintage ENT plates for the sound. The tour chose to only use Sennheiser microphones. McDonald chose to have Adele use a wireless Sennheiser SKM 2000 system with an SKM 500–965 G3 transmitter. For the back-up singers, McDonald chose hardwired Sennheiser e 935s. The guitarists used Avalon DIs and the piano was a "gag piano", lacquered upright to look traditional but actually housed a Yamaha MO. McDonald's goal for the tour was, "I want the audience to forget who they are for a moment and be able to project themselves solely onto what's occurring onstage. That is, after all, why we go to shows."

The tour featured a 12-piece string section that backed Adele up, consisting of eight violins, two violas, and two cellos. During some performances, a 20-ft mirrorball (named "Mirrorball Mike") descended from the ceiling during the encore. A screen lifted up at the beginning of the concert to reveal Adele and occasionally descended behind her with images projected upon it. During "Hometown Glory", an image of St. Paul's Cathedral was projected onto the screen.

== Opening acts ==
- The Civil Wars (North America, leg 1, select dates and United Kingdom, leg 2)
- Plan B (North America, leg 1, select dates)
- Wanda Jackson (North America, leg 2, select dates)
- Amos Lee (United Kingdom, leg 2)
- Michael Kiwanuka (United Kingdom, leg 2)

== Setlist ==
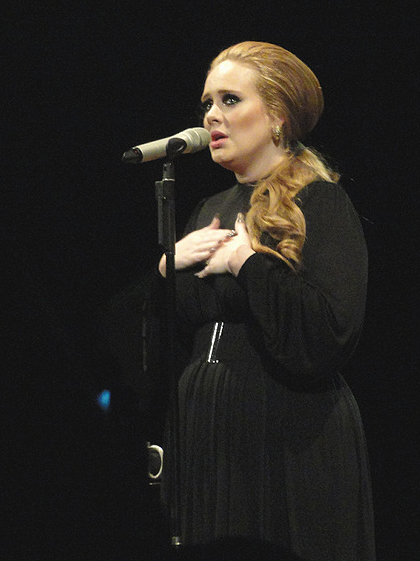
Adele performing "Someone Like You" during a concert in Seattle, Washington.

1. "Hometown Glory"
2. "I'll Be Waiting"
3. "Don't You Remember"
4. "Turning Tables"
5. "Set Fire to the Rain"
6. "Daydreamer"
7. "If It Hadn't Been for Love"
8. "My Same"
9. "Take It All"
10. "Rumour Has It"
11. "Right as Rain"
12. "One and Only"
13. "Lovesong"
14. "Chasing Pavements"
15. "Make You Feel My Love"
  Encore
16. "Someone like You"
17. "Rolling in the Deep"

Notes

- "Daydreamer" was not performed in North American leg or at Royal Albert Hall
- Starting July 2011, "I Can't Make You Love Me" was added to the setlist.
- On the second North American leg, "Someone like You" followed "Rolling in the Deep".

== Shows ==
"As I’m sure most of you know I had to cancel over half of my US tour a couple weeks back. It was a devastating decision to make, but I really had no choice. I had to give my voice 2 weeks rest or risk permanent damage"
— Adele on cancelling part of her North American tour.

Date	City	Country	Venue	Opening Act
Leg 1 – Europe
21 March 2011	Oslo	Norway	Rockefeller Music Hall	
23 March 2011	Stockholm	Sweden	Debaser Medis	
26 March 2011	Hamburg	Germany	Docks Club	
27 March 2011	Berlin	Germany	Huxleys Neue Welt	
29 March 2011	Munich	Germany	Kesselhaus	
30 March 2011	Milan	Italy	Discoteca Alcatraz	
1 April 2011	Barcelona	Spain	Sala Bikini	
2 April 2011	Madrid	Spain	Sala La Riviera	
4 April 2011	Paris	France	La Cigale	
5 April 2011	Brussels	Belgium	Cirque Royal	
7 April 2011	Cologne	Germany	Burgerhaus Stollwerck	
8 April 2011	Amsterdam	Netherlands	Paradiso	
10 April 2011	Copenhagen	Denmark	Vega Musikkens Hus	
12 April 2011	Dublin	Ireland	Olympia Theatre	
14 April 2011	Leeds	England	O_{2} Academy Leeds	
15 April 2011	Glasgow	Scotland	O_{2} ABC Glasgow	
17 April 2011	Manchester	England	Manchester Academy	
18 April 2011	Birmingham	England	Digbeth Institute	
20 April 2011	Southampton	England	Southampton Guildhall	
21 April 2011	London	England	O_{2} Shepherd's Bush Empire	
Leg 1 – North America
12 May 2011	Washington, D.C.	United States	9:30 Club	
13 May 2011	Philadelphia	United States	Electric Factory	
15 May 2011	Boston	United States	House of Blues	
16 May 2011	Montreal	Canada	L'Olympia de Montréal	
18 May 2011	Toronto	Canada	Air Canada Centre	
19 May 2011	New York City	United States	Beacon Theatre	The Civil Wars
21 May 2011	New York City	United States	United Palace Theater	Plan B
23 May 2011	Royal Oak	United States	Royal Oak Music Theatre	Plan B
24 May 2011	Chicago	United States	Riviera Theatre	Plan B
28 May 2011	Denver	United States	Ogden Theatre	
Leg 2 – Europe
2 July 2011^{[A]}	London	England	Heaven	
7 July 2011^{[B]}	London	England	The Roundhouse	
Leg 2 – North America
9 August 2011	Vancouver	Canada	Orpheum Theatre	Wanda Jackson
11 August 2011	Troutdale	United States	McMenamins Edgefield	Wanda Jackson
12 August 2011	Seattle	United States	Paramount Theatre	Wanda Jackson
14 August 2011	Berkeley	United States	Hearst Greek Theatre	Wanda Jackson
15 August 2011	Los Angeles	United States	Greek Theatre	Wanda Jackson
17 August 2011	Los Angeles	United States	Hollywood Palladium	Wanda Jackson
18 August 2011	San Diego	United States	SDSU Open Air Theatre	Wanda Jackson
20 August 2011	Las Vegas	United States	Chelsea Ballroom	Wanda Jackson
21 August 2011	Salt Lake City	United States	Gallivan Center	Wanda Jackson
24 August 2011	Saint Paul	United States	The Theater at Xcel Energy Center	Wanda Jackson
Leg 2 – Europe
13 September 2011	Leicester	England	De Montfort Hall	
14 September 2011	Newcastle	England	O_{2} Academy Newcastle	
16 September 2011	Manchester	England	O2 Apollo Manchester	
17 September 2011	Manchester	England	O2 Apollo Manchester	
19 September 2011	London	England	Hammersmith Apollo	
20 September 2011	London	England	Hammersmith Apollo	
22 September 2011	London	England	Royal Albert Hall	
24 September 2011	Edinburgh	Scotland	Usher Hall	
25 September 2011	Glasgow	Scotland	O_{2} Academy Glasgow	

Festivals and other miscellaneous performances
^{A} This concert was a part of the London Pride
^{B} This concert was a part of the iTunes Festival

Cancellations and rescheduled shows

21 March 2011	Oslo, Norway	John Dee	This concert has been moved to the Rockefeller Music Hall
26 March 2011	Hamburg, Germany	Cafe Keese	This concert has been moved to the Docks Club
29 March 2011	Munich, Germany	Theaterfabrik München	This concert has been moved to Kesselhaus
2 April 2011	Madrid, Spain	Sala Caracol	This concert has been moved to Sala La Riviera
17 April 2011	Manchester, England	The Ritz	This concert has been moved to the Manchester Academy
18 May 2011	Toronto, Ontario	Kool Haus	This concert has been moved to the Air Canada Centre
26 May 2011	Minneapolis, Minnesota	First Avenue	This concert has been rescheduled due to 22 June 2011.
29 May 2011	Salt Lake City, Utah	The Depot	Postponed. The show was rescheduled to 21 August 2011 and moved to the Gallivan Center.
31 May 2011	Vancouver, British Columbia	Commodore Ballroom	This concert has been moved to the Orpheum Theatre
31 May 2011	Vancouver, British Columbia	Orpheum Theatre	Postponed. The show was rescheduled to 9 August 2011.
1 June 2011	Seattle, Washington	Showbox at the Market	This concert has been moved to the Paramount Theatre
1 June 2011	Seattle, Washington	Paramount Theatre	Postponed. This show was reschedule to 12 August 2011.
3 June 2011	Portland, Oregon	McMenamins Crystal Ballroom	Postponed. This show was reschedule to 11 August 2011 and moved to McMenamins Edgefield in Troutdale, Oregon.
4 June 2011	San Francisco, California	Warfield Theatre	This concert has been moved to the Hearst Greek Theatre
4 June 2011	Berkeley, California	Hearst Greek Theatre	Postponed. This show was reschedule to 14 August 2011.
6 June 2011	Los Angeles, California	Greek Theatre	Postponed. This show was reschedule to 15 August 2011.
8 June 2011	San Diego, California	Humphrey's Concerts by the Bay	Postponed. This show was reschedule to 18 August 2011 and moved to the Open Air Theatre.
9 June 2011	Los Angeles, California	Wiltern Theatre	This concert has been moved to the Hollywood Palladium
9 June 2011	Los Angeles, California	Hollywood Palladium	Postponed. This show was reschedule to 16 August 2011.
12 June 2011	Austin, Texas	Waller Creek Amphitheatre	Postponed. This show was reschedule to 19 October 2011 and moved to the Frank Erwin Center.
15 June 2011	Dallas, Texas	House of Blues	Postponed. This show was reschedule to 21 October 2011 and moved to the Verizon Theatre at Grand Prairie in Grand Prairie, Texas.
17 June 2011	Atlanta, Georgia	The Tabernacle	Postponed. This show was reschedule to 16 October 2011 and moved to the Fox Theatre.
18 June 2011	Asheville, North Carolina	Orange Peel	This concert has been moved to the Wolfe Auditorium
18 June 2011	Asheville, North Carolina	Wolfe Auditorium	Postponed. This show was reschedule to 11 October 2011.
20 June 2011	Nashville, Tennessee	Ryman Auditorium	Postponed. This show was reschedule to 10 October 2011.
22 June 2011	Minneapolis, Minnesota	First Avenue	Postponed. This show was reschedule to 24 August 2011 and moved to the Xcel Energy Center in Saint Paul, Minnesota.
4 September 2011	Plymouth, England	Plymouth Pavilions	Postponed Rescheduled to 15 November 2011
5 September 2011	Bournemouth, England	Windsor Hall	Postponed Rescheduled to 12 November 2011
7 September 2011	Cardiff, Wales	Motorpoint Arena Cardiff	Postponed Rescheduled to 14 November 2011
8 September 2011	Blackpool, England	Empress Ballroom	Postponed Rescheduled to 10 November 2011
9 September 2011	Wolverhampton, England	Wolverhampton Civic Hall	Postponed Rescheduled to 7 November 2011
10 September 2011	Wolverhampton, England	Wolverhampton Civic Hall	Postponed Rescheduled to 8 November 2011
7 October 2011	Atlantic City, New Jersey	Borgata Events Center	Cancelled due to strained vocal cords
8 October 2011	Durham, North Carolina	Durham Performing Arts Center	Cancelled due to strained vocal cords
10 October 2011	Nashville, Tennessee	Ryman Auditorium	Cancelled due to strained vocal cords
11 October 2011	Asheville, North Carolina	Wolfe Auditorium	Cancelled due to strained vocal cords
13 October 2011	Orlando, Florida	Hard Rock Live	Cancelled due to strained vocal cords
14 October 2011	Miami	Waterfront Theatre	Cancelled due to strained vocal cords
16 October 2011	Atlanta	Fox Theatre	Cancelled due to strained vocal cords
18 October 2011	The Woodlands	Cynthia Woods Mitchell Pavilion	Cancelled due to strained vocal cords
19 October 2011	Austin	Frank Erwin Center	Cancelled due to strained vocal cords
21 October 2011	Grand Prairie	Verizon Theatre at Grand Prairie	Cancelled due to strained vocal cords
7 November 2011	Wolverhampton, England	Wolverhampton Civic Hall	Cancelled due to strained vocal cords
8 November 2011	Wolverhampton, England	Wolverhampton Civic Hall	Cancelled due to strained vocal cords
10 November 2011	Blackpool, England	Empress Ballroom	Cancelled due to strained vocal cords
12 November 2011	Bournemouth, England	Windsor Hall	Cancelled due to strained vocal cords
14 November 2011	Cardiff, Wales	Motorpoint Arena Cardiff	Cancelled due to strained vocal cords
15 November 2011	Plymouth, England	Plymouth Pavilions	Cancelled due to strained vocal cords

=== Box office score data ===
Venue	City	Tickets sold / available	Gross revenue
Olympia Theatre	Dublin	1,621 / 1,621 (100%)	$66,942
9:30 Club	Washington, D.C.	1,200 / 1,200 (100%)	$42,000
L'Olympia de Montréal	Montreal	1,851 / 1,851 (100%)	$57,300
Air Canada Centre	Toronto	6,624 / 6,624 (100%)	$322,594
Beacon Theatre	New York City	2,770 / 2,770 (100%)	$118,141
Royal Oak Music Theatre	Royal Oak	1,700 / 1,700 (100%)	$42,500
Riviera Theatre	Chicago	2,500 / 2,500 (100%)	$85,000
Hearst Greek Theatre	Berkeley	8,189 / 8,189 (100%)	$400,040
Greek Theatre	Los Angeles	5,856 / 5,856 (100%)	$254,393
The Theatre at Xcel Energy Center	Saint Paul	9,443 / 9,443 (100%)	$525,483
Kesselhaus	Munich	1,620 / 1,620 (100%)	$52,172
TOTAL		43,374 / 43,374 (100%)	$1,966,565

== Broadcasts and recordings ==
The concert at The Roundhouse (a part of the iTunes Festival) was streamed live on iTunes. The event was followed with an EP release entitled iTunes Festival: London 2011. The album showcases an abbreviated concert with the songs; "One and Only", "Don't You Remember", "Rumour Has It", "Take It All", "I Can't Make You Love Me" and "Rolling in the Deep". The album is an iTunes exclusive and was made available for download on 14 July 2011. A DVD/Blu-ray/CD entitled Live at the Royal Albert Hall was released on 28 November 2011. It features the entire concert along with behind the scenes footage.

== Personnel ==
- Adele: Vocals, guitar on "Daydreamer" and occasionally "My Same"
- Ben Thomas: Guitar
- Tim Van Der Kuil: Guitar
- Miles Robertson: Keyboards
- Sam Dixon: Bass guitar
- Derrick Wright: Drums
- Kelli-Leigh Henry-Davila, Sharleen Linton: Background vocals
- David "Zop" Yard: Tour manager
- Pat Baker: Production manager
- Rob Sinclair: Production designer
- George Sinclair: Associate designer
- Dave McDonald: Front-of-house engineer
- Joe Campbell: Monitor engineer
- Adam Newman & Adam Carr: Stage techs

Source: Adele's Official Myspace

== Accolades ==
Year	Nominee / work	Award	Result	Ref.
2012	Adele	23rd Pollstar Awards - Best New Touring Artist	Won	
