= Live at the Royal Albert Hall (Adele album) =

Live album by Adele
- Released: 29 November 2011
- Recorded: 22 September 2011
- Venue: Royal Albert Hall (London, England)
- Genre: Soul; pop
- Length: 100 mins
- Label: XL; Columbia; Sony

Adele chronology
iTunes Festival: London 2011 (2011)	Live at the Royal Albert Hall (2011)	25 (2015)

Live at the Royal Albert Hall is a live album and video album by the English singer-songwriter Adele, which became available on 29 November 2011 in Australia, 27 November 2011 in the United Kingdom and 29 November 2011 in the United States. The concert was recorded as part of Adele's Adele Live tour at the Royal Albert Hall in London, including songs from her global best-sellers 19 and 21.

On 26 October 2011, it was announced Adele would be releasing her Royal Albert Hall concert from her Adele Live tour on both DVD and Blu-ray along with an accompanying CD. The release included 90 minutes of concert footage in addition to behind-the-scenes video segments. The track list consists of songs taken from Adele's 19 and 21 as well as covers of Bonnie Raitt's "I Can't Make You Love Me" and The SteelDrivers' "If It Hadn't Been for Love". As part of the launch, the DVD was screened at cinemas in 26 cities around the world.

Live at the Royal Albert Hall holds the record for the most weeks spent 16 weeks at number one in the United States for a music DVD by a female artist and charting for 102 weeks, and has sold more than three million copies worldwide. The live version of "Set Fire to the Rain" taken from the special won the Grammy Award for Best Pop Solo Performance at the 55th ceremony in 2013.

== Critical reception ==
Professional ratings
Aggregate scores
Source	Rating
Metacritic	76/100
Review scores
Source	Rating
AllMusic	4/5 stars
American Songwriter	3/5 stars
Consequence of Sound	4/5 stars
The Independent	positive
Los Angeles Times	3/4 stars
News.com.au	5/5 stars

Live at the Royal Albert Hall was well received by music critics. At Metacritic, which assigns a normalised rating out of 100 to reviews from mainstream critics, the album received an average score of 76, based on 5 reviews, which indicates "generally favorable reviews".

The Boston Globe labeled the release "Our DVD pick" and said, "the performances are routinely inspired. With the voice of an angel – and the potty mouth of a sailor – she's a force throughout." In a very positive review, MTV News writes, "I actually had to remind myself not to clap at the conclusion of a couple songs... And in that regard, it is a tremendous success; you definitely get the full experience. Adele is luminous, compelling, funny and profane throughout, and like I said, her voice is in tiptop shape."

However, Maria Schurr of PopMatters was more critical. She gave the DVD a 6/10 and wrote, "Yes, her voice is unbelievable and her everygirl personality is refreshing, but musically and artistically I find her a bit dull."

== Commercial performance ==
Live at the Royal Albert Hall debuted at number one in the United States with 96,000 copies sold, the highest one-week tally for a music DVD in four years. After one week, Live at the Royal Albert Hall became the best-selling music DVD of 2011. This makes Adele the first artist in Nielsen SoundScan history to have the year's number one album, the year's number one single, and the year's number one music DVD. In its 16th week at number one in the United States, it became the longest-running video by a female artist since Barbra Streisand's Barbra- The Concert was number one for 16 weeks in 1996. It is the first video to spend 17 consecutive weeks at number one since Jay-Z and Linkin Park's Collision Course in 2005. In April 2012, the album topped the US charts for an 18th week, making it the longest-running music video by a British artist since Pink Floyd's Pulse in 1996. On 8 April 2012, the DVD spent its 19th consecutive week at number one in the United States, becoming the longest continuous run at number one for a music DVD since 1999. In May 2012, the DVD matched Whitney Houston's record for the most weeks spent by a music video release at number one by a female artist with 22 consecutive weeks at number one. Houston had set the record in 1986 with the release of her The No. 1 Video Hits video. After returning to number one the week of 16 May 2012, the DVD set the record for the most weeks spent at number one for a music DVD by a female artist with 23 weeks at number one. In May 2013, the DVD logged its 28th week on top of the chart, extending its record for the longest-running No. 1 music video by a female artist.

Midway through 2012, Live at the Royal Albert Hall was the best-selling music DVD in the United States with sales of 464,000 in the first six months of 2012 alone and bringing its total US sales to 915,000. This is more than any music video has sold in the first half of a year since Jay-Z and Linkin Park's Collision Course in 2005. By late August 2012, Live at the Royal Albert Hall had sold 955,000 copies in the United States.

As of 28 November 2012, Live at the Royal Albert Hall had surpassed sales of one million copies in the United States and sales of three million copies worldwide. Live at the Royal Albert Hall is the first music DVD to surpass sales of one million in the USA since Eagles' Farewell 1 Tour-Live from Melbourne in 2005 (Garth Brooks' The Ultimate Hits sold one million copies in 2007, but was a CD/DVD combination). In 2014, the Brazilian Association of Record Producers (ABPD), granted to sixfold Diamond to Live at the Royal Albert Hall for its sales over 1 million copies in Brazil.

== Accolades ==
Year	Ceremony	Category	Result	Ref.
2012	Royal Television Society Awards	Best Multicamera Work	Won	
2013	Premios Oye!	Best English Album	Won	

== Broadcasts ==
Live at the Royal Albert Hall made its television debut on SABC3 in South Africa on 31 December 2011. It then aired on BBC One in the United Kingdom on 1 January 2012 in an abbreviated version. The video made its French television debut on NRJ Hits on 2 March 2012 in an abbreviated version. It was repeated on BBC One on Wednesday 4 April 2012. A red button feature included the 'You, Me and Albert' behind the scenes footage that was seen on the DVD with "I Can't Make You Love Me" following. The set list on the abbreviated version was:

1. "Hometown Glory"
2. "I'll Be Waiting"
3. "Don't You Remember"
4. "Turning Tables"
5. "Set Fire to the Rain"
6. "My Same"
7. "Rumour Has It"
8. "Chasing Pavements"
9. "Make You Feel My Love"
10. "Someone Like You"
11. "Rolling in the Deep"

Therefore, the cut songs were "If It Hadn't Been for Love", "Take It All", "Right as Rain", "One and Only", "Lovesong" and "I Can't Make You Love Me".

=== Adele Live in London with Matt Lauer ===
On 3 June 2012, NBC aired a special titled Adele Live in London with Matt Lauer. The special combined performances from Live at the Royal Albert Hall with an exclusive interview with Adele given by Matt Lauer. Adele Live in London with Matt Lauer was the top-rated program of its hour and helped NBC win the night. The TV special and its success helped revitalise sales for 21. Adele Live in London with Matt Lauer included seven performances from Live at the Royal Albert Hall: "Set Fire to the Rain", "Chasing Pavements", "Someone Like You", "Rolling in the Deep", "Turning Tables", "I'll Be Waiting", and "Hometown Glory".

== Track listing ==
Live at the Royal Albert Hall track listing
No.	Title	Writer(s)	Length
1.	"Hometown Glory"	Adele Adkins	4:17
2.	"I'll Be Waiting"	Adkins; Paul Epworth	3:55
3.	"Don't You Remember"	Adkins; Dan Wilson	4:04
4.	"Turning Tables"	Adkins; Ryan Tedder	4:10
5.	"Set Fire to the Rain"	Adkins; Fraser T Smith	4:16
6.	"If It Hadn't Been for Love"	Mike Henderson; Chris Stapleton	3:08
7.	"My Same"	Adkins	2:34
8.	"Take It All"	Adkins; Francis White	3:56
9.	"Rumour Has It"	Adkins; Tedder	3:47
10.	"Right as Rain"	Adkins; Leon Michels; Jeff Silverman; Nick Movshon; Clay Holley	2:43
11.	"One and Only"	Adkins; Wilson; Greg Wells	5:53
12.	"Lovesong"	Robert Smith; Simon Gallup; Roger O'Donnell; Porl Thompson; Lol Tolhurst; Boris Williams	5:17
13.	"Chasing Pavements"	Adkins; White	3:41
14.	"I Can't Make You Love Me"	Mike Reid; Allen Shamblin	3:39
15.	"Make You Feel My Love"	Bob Dylan	3:48
Total length:			61:08

Encore
No.	Title	Writer(s)	Length
16.	"Someone Like You"	Adkins; Wilson	4:54
17.	"Rolling in the Deep"	Adkins; Epworth	4:48
Total length:			70:50

== Personnel ==
Credits adapted from the album liner notes:

- Adele – lead vocals
- Paul Dugdale – director
- Ben Thomas – guitar
- Tim Van Der Kuil – guitar
- Miles Robertson – keys
- Sam Dixon – bass
- Derrick Wright – drums
- Kelli-Leigh Henry-Davila – backing vocals
- Sharleen Linton – backing vocals
- Rosie Danvers – cello
- Bryony James – cello
- Becky Jones – viola
- Sarah Chapman – viola
- Hayley Pomfrett – violin
- Sally Jackson – violin
- Kotono Sato – violin
- Jo Allen – violin
- Ellie Stamford – violin
- Stephanie Cavey – violin
- Jenny Sacha – violin
- Ana Croad – violin

== Charts ==
Chart (2011–13)	Peak position
Australia Top 40 Music DVD Chart	1
Austrian Music DVD Chart	1
Belgian Music DVD Chart (Flanders)	1
Belgian Music DVD Chart (Wallonia)	1
Brazilian Music DVD Chart	4
Croatian Albums Chart	2
Czech Albums Chart	29
Czech Music DVD Chart	2
Danish Music DVD Chart	1
Dutch Albums Chart	2
Dutch Music DVD Chart	1
Finnish Music DVD Chart	1
French Music DVD Chart	1
German Albums (Offizielle Top 100)	5
German Music DVD Chart	1
Greek Albums Chart	20
Hungarian Music DVD Chart	3
Irish Top 10 Music DVDs	1
Italian Albums Chart	16
Italian Music DVD Chart	4
Japanese Albums Chart	61
Mexican Albums Chart	3
Norwegian Music DVD Chart	1
Polish Albums Chart	5
Portuguese Albums Chart	1
Spanish Albums Chart	14
Swedish Music DVD Chart	1
Swiss Music DVD Chart	1
UK Video Charts	2
US Music DVD Chart	1

=== Year-end charts ===
Chart (2011)	Position
Australian Music DVD Chart	1
Belgian Music DVD Chart (Flanders)	7
Belgian Music DVD Chart (Wallonia)	12
Dutch Albums Chart	9
Dutch Music DVD Chart	3
French Music DVD Chart	4
German Albums Chart	43
Irish Music Video Chart	2
Mexican Albums Chart	25
Polish Albums Chart	9
Swedish Music DVD Chart	10
U.S. Music DVD Chart	1
Chart (2012)	Position
Australian Music DVD Chart	3
Belgian Music DVD Chart (Flanders)	1
Belgian Music DVD Chart (Wallonia)	2
Brazilian Music DVD Chart	1
Dutch Albums Chart	2
Dutch Music DVD Chart	1
German Albums Chart	38
Italian Albums Chart	88
Mexican Albums Chart	7
Spanish Albums Chart	28

== Certifications and sales ==
Region	Certification	Certified units/sales
CD
Brazil (Pro-Música Brasil)	2× Diamond	320,000^{*}
Italy (FIMI)	Gold	30,000^{*}
Israel	—	5,000
Mexico (AMPROFON)	2× Platinum+Gold	150,000^{^}
Portugal (AFP)	Gold	7,500^{^}
Spain (Promusicae)	Gold	20,000^{^}
DVD
Australia (ARIA)	7× Platinum	105,000^{^}
Brazil (Pro-Música Brasil)	6× Diamond	840,000
Canada (Music Canada)	Diamond	100,000^{^}
France (SNEP)	Gold	5,000^{*}
Germany (BVMI)	4× Platinum	200,000^{^}
United Kingdom (BPI)	3× Platinum	150,000^{*}
United States (RIAA)	10× Platinum	1,000,000^{^}
^{*} Sales figures based on certification alone.^{^} Shipments figures based on certification alone.
