= 19 (Adele album) =

- Standard edition cover (Note: The expanded edition cover only features Adele's name and the album's title name with the same font as the standard edition cover on a black background.)

Studio album by Adele
- Released: 28 January 2008
- Recorded: May–October 2007
- Studios: Angel; Bimbos; Highline Ballroom; Metropolis; Olympic; RAK; Konk; Roxy; Townhouse; World Café
- Genre: Blue-eyed soul
- Length: 43:41
- Labels: XL; Columbia
- Producers: Jim Abbiss; Mark Ronson; Eg White

Adele chronology
19 (2008)	21 (2011)

Singles from 19
- 1. "Hometown Glory" Released: 22 October 2007; 2. "Chasing Pavements" Released: 14 January 2008; 3. "Cold Shoulder" Released: 21 April 2008; 4. "Make You Feel My Love" Released: 27 October 2008

19 is the debut studio album by the English singer-songwriter Adele, released on 28 January 2008 by XL Recordings. Following Adele's graduation from the BRIT School in April 2006, she began publishing songs and recorded a three-song demo for a class project and gave it to a friend. They posted the demo on MySpace, where it became successful and led to interest from the record label. This led to Adele signing a recording contract at age 17 with the label and providing vocals for Jack Peñate. During the session for Peñate's, she met the producer Jim Abbiss, who produced the majority of 19.

Four singles were released, with "Chasing Pavements" and "Make You Feel My Love" reaching the top ten on the UK singles chart, while the former became Adele's first entry on the Billboard Hot 100. The album also contains her first song, "Hometown Glory", written when she was 16, which is based on her home suburb of West Norwood, London.

Named after the age of the singer during its release and production, 19 is a blue-eyed soul album with folk rock, indie pop, and jazz influences and lyrics describing heartbreak, nostalgia and relationships. 19 received positive reviews from music critics, who praised Adele's vocal prowess and songwriting talent at such a young age and noted her as having the "potential to become among the most respected and inspiring international artists of her generation." 19 was shortlisted for the Mercury Prize. At the 51st Annual Grammy Awards, Adele won Best New Artist alongside Best Female Pop Vocal Performance for "Chasing Pavements".

19 became a global success, reaching number one in the United Kingdom, and reaching the top 10 in fifteen other countries, including the United States. It has sold over 8.5 million copies worldwide and has also sold over 2.5 million copies in the UK to become one of the best-selling albums of the 21st century. The album is among the top 20 best-selling debut albums in the UK. In support of 19, Adele embarked on a concert tour, An Evening with Adele, across North America and United Kingdom, which received acclaim.

== Background and recording ==
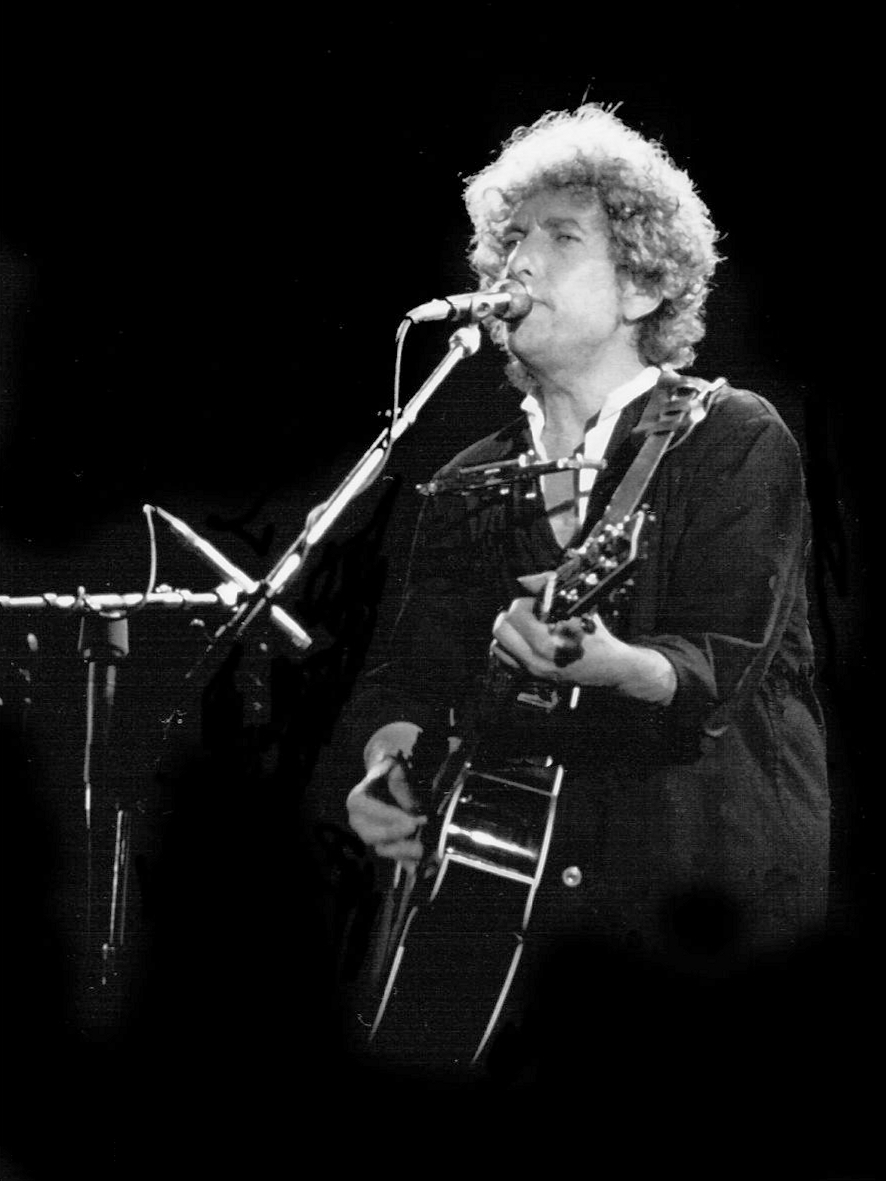
Adele recorded a cover of Bob Dylan's "Make You Feel My Love" on the recommendation of her manager Jonathan Dickins.

Adele graduated from the BRIT School for Performing Arts & Technology in Croydon in April 2006, where she was a classmate of Leona Lewis and Jessie J. Adele credits the school with nurturing her talent even though, at the time, she was more interested in going into A&R and hoped to launch other people's careers. Four months after graduation, she published two songs on the fourth issue of the online arts publication PlatformsMagazine.com. She had recorded a three-song demo for a class project and given it to a friend. The friend posted the demo on Myspace, where it became very successful and led to a phone call from Richard Russell, boss of the music label XL Recordings. She doubted if the offer was real because the only record company she knew was Virgin Records, and she took a friend with her to the meeting.

Nick Huggett, at XL, recommended Adele to manager Jonathan Dickins at September Management, and in June 2006, Dickins became her official representative. September was managing Jamie T at the time and this proved a major draw for Adele, a big fan of the British singer-songwriter. Huggett then signed Adele to XL in September 2006. Adele provided vocals for Jack Peñate's song, "My Yvonne", for his debut album Matinée, and it was during this session she first met producer Jim Abbiss, who would go on to produce both the majority of her debut album, 19, and tracks on 21. Adele recorded a cover of Bob Dylan's "Make You Feel My Love" on the recommendation of her manager Jonathan Dickins, who loved the song.

The first single released from 19 was "Chasing Pavements", which Adele wrote in collaboration with Eg White. "Chasing Pavements" was inspired by an incident Adele had with a former boyfriend of six months. After learning he had cheated on her, she went to the bar he was at and punched him in the face. After being thrown out, Adele walked down the street alone and thought to herself, "What is it you're chasing? You're chasing an empty pavement." She sang and recorded it on her mobile phone and arranged the chords when she got home. Adele and White co-wrote two other songs for the album: "Melt My Heart to Stone" and "Tired". She also collaborated with Sacha Skarbek on the single "Cold Shoulder". However, most of the songs were written solely by Adele, including "Best for Last", "Crazy for You", "First Love", and "My Same", as well as her debut single, "Hometown Glory". That song was written by Adele in 10 minutes after her mother tried to persuade her to leave her home town of West Norwood in London for university.

== Release and promotion ==
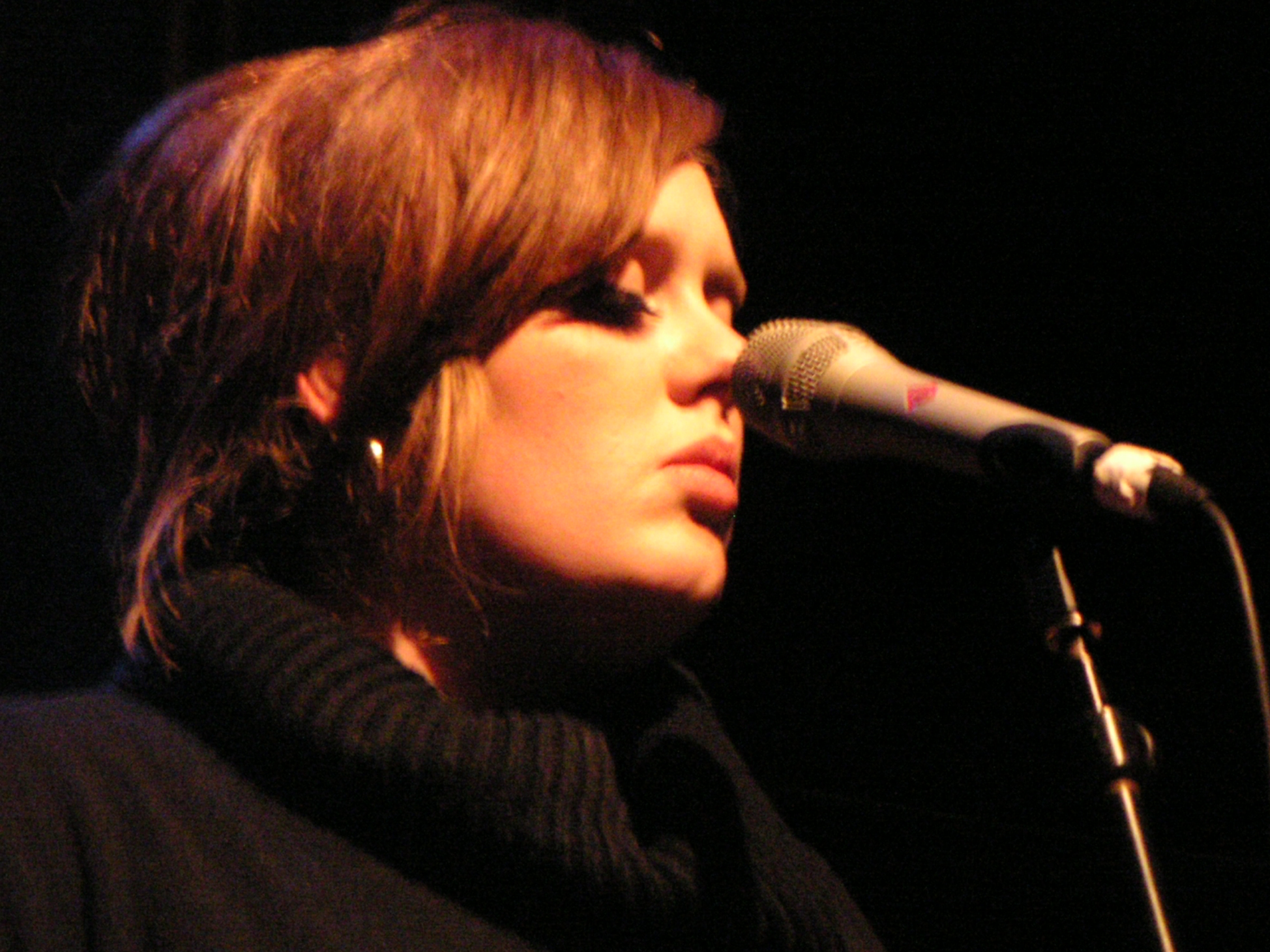
Adele performing live in 2009

In July 2008, Adele informed noted UK soul writer Pete Lewis of the award-winning Blues & Soul that the reason for naming her debut album '19' was to reflect her age while she was writing it: "I just kinda remember becoming a bit of a woman during that time. And I think that is definitely documented in the songs." The Taiwanese edition was released on 5 March, with three bonus tracks: "That's It I Quit I'm Movin' On" ("Chasing Pavements" B-side), "Now and Then" ("Cold Shoulder" B-side) and "Painting Pictures" ("Make You Feel My Love" B-side). The Indonesian special edition was released on 3 March. As well as the standard track list, the album features a bonus video for "Chasing Pavements".

By 2008, Adele had become the headliner and performed an acoustic set, in which she was supported by Damien Rice. She embarked on a short North American tour in the same month, and 19 was released in the US in June. Billboard magazine stated of it: "Adele truly has potential to become among the most respected and inspiring international artists of her generation." The An Evening with Adele world tour began in May 2008 and ended in June 2009.

She later cancelled the 2008 US tour dates to be with a former boyfriend. She said in Nylon magazine in June 2009, "I'm like, 'I can't believe I did that.' It seems so ungrateful.... I was drinking far too much and that was kind of the basis of my relationship with this boy. I couldn't bear to be without him, so I was like, 'Well, OK, I'll just cancel my stuff then.'" By the middle of October 2008, Adele's attempt to break in America appeared to have failed. But then she was booked as the musical guest on the 18 October 2008 episode of NBC's Saturday Night Live. The episode, which included an expected appearance by then US vice-presidential candidate Sarah Palin, earned the program its best ratings in 14 years with 17 million viewers. Adele performed "Chasing Pavements" and "Cold Shoulder", and the following day, 19 topped the iTunes charts and ranked at number five at Amazon.com while "Chasing Pavements" rose into the top 25. The album reached number 11 on the Billboard 200 as a result, a jump of 35 places over the previous week.

== Critical reception ==
Professional ratings
Aggregate scores
Source	Rating
Metacritic	68/100
Review scores
Source	Rating
AllMusic	3.5/5 stars
Entertainment Weekly	B
The Guardian	2/5 stars
PopMatters	8/10 stars
NME	2.5/5 stars
The Observer	5/5 stars
Q	4/5 stars
Rolling Stone	3/5 stars
Spin	2.5/5 stars
The Times	4/5 stars

19 received generally positive reviews from critics who praised Adele's vocal prowess and songwriting talent. It holds a 68 out of 100 rating, based on 19 critical reviews, at Metacritic.

The Observer's Caspar Llewellyn Smith wrote in his review, "The way [Adele] stretched the vowels, her wonderful soulful phrasing, the sheer unadulterated pleasure of her voice, stood out all the more; little doubt that she's a rare singer, which another track first available on her MySpace site, 'Daydreamer', confirmed" they gave the album a five-star response. "Pitching up somewhere between blues, folk and jazz, she's included something for everyone without ever pandering to a particular trend", wrote Chris Long from BBC Music. "Her melodies exude warmth, her singing is occasionally stunning and, in the dramatic Hometown Glory, the spiky cool of Cold Shoulder (which is unexpectedly reminiscent of Shara Nelson-era Massive Attack) and the piano epic Make You Feel My Love, she has tracks that make Lily Allen and Kate Nash sound every bit as ordinary as they are."

Chuck Taylor said in Billboard that "Adele truly has potential to become among the most respected and inspiring international artists of her generation." Phil Gallo of Variety wrote that 19 was an "agreeable, soulful album, a varied mix of classic pop textures". He compared Lily Allen, Duffy, Kate Nash, Joss Stone and Amy Winehouse, who "are plowing single plots of R&B soil", to Adele, adopting "a broader perspective, assimilating various pre-disco R&B styles to create a field with the potential to bear fruit for years to come". PopMatters's Ron Hart wrote: "This is music, mind you, that clear blows the roof off any other blue-eyed R&B album that has come out of Great Britain since Macca got down with Stevie Wonder."

Mikael Wood was less impressed in Entertainment Weekly, writing that "Adele's songs aren't as sharp as Duffy's ... Still, her singing throughout is a thing to behold." Uncut was more critical, believing that "Adele can certainly sing, but '19' reeks of some A&R trendhound making it his/her biz to sign The New Amy and not resting till s/he's found the right chick from South London to fit the bill". Andy Gill of The Independent said, "19 is a passably decent debut". According to NME, "as '19' reveals itself, it's clear that the Amy associations are little more than empty mediaspeak without any real weight. Despite the early indicators, there's precious little on the album that prevents it from collapsing under the weight of its own expectation."

== Commercial performance ==
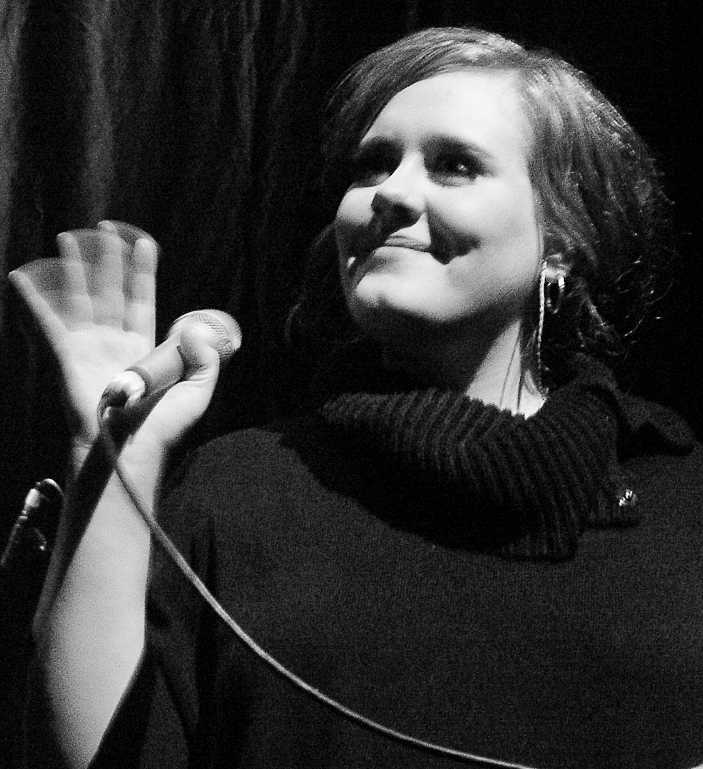
19 was named in the top 20 best-selling debut albums of all time in the UK.

In the United Kingdom, 19 debuted at number one. In the same week as 21 was released, 19 climbed to number four on the UK Albums Chart with sales of 25,419 copies. On 6 February 2011, it remained on the chart at number four, with strengthening sales of 27,660 copies. It was the second best selling album of 2011 in the United Kingdom, behind 21, as it tripled its 2008 seven non-consecutive week-long top 10-visit with 21 straight weeks. As of March 2016, 19 has sold over 2,309,000 copies in the United Kingdom. In Ireland, due to the success of 21, the album returned to its peak position of number 3 on the week ending 18 March 2011, three years after it originally peaked, just to set a new high at number two on the following week and to stay there for six non-consecutive weeks, behind 21. The album debuted at number 16 on the New Zealand Albums Chart,due to the success of 21 and has peaked at number three. In March 2017, 19 returned to No. five in its 58th charting week with her other two albums in the top five as well. 19 has sold over 2.5 million copies in the United Kingdom and over 8.5 million copies worldwide as of 2022. and was named in top 20 best-selling debut albums of all time in the United Kingdom.

In the United States, 19 debuted at number 61 and remained in the lower ends of the Billboard 200 for many proceeding weeks. After a performance on the US show Saturday Night Live, it rose to number 46 and a week later to number 11 with 25,000+ copies sold. In 2009, after winning two Grammy Awards, the album rose to number 10 on the US Billboard 200 and total sales reached 843,880. In February 2012, 19 reached a new peak of number 4 on the Billboard 200, and the album is now a certified double platinum by the certified (RIAA) in the United States. As of the week ending 24 April 2011, 19 was a number one on the Top Pop Catalog Albums for nine weeks, making it only the third album by a female artist to top that chart at least that long in the past 20 years. On the following week, it stayed at number one on the chart, making it the first studio album doing so since Michael Jackson's Thriller 25 was at number one for 11 weeks in 2008. Months later, it had moved up from number 27 to number 16 on the Billboard 200, topping the Top Pop Catalog Albums for the sixteenth week.

In Australia, the album returned to the top 10, at No. 9, in its 74th charting week in March 2017 with her other studio albums 25 and 21 placed at No. 2 and 4 respectively.

== Accolades and impact ==
Adele became the first recipient of the Brit Awards Critics' Choice and was named the number-one predicted breakthrough act of 2008 in an annual BBC poll of music critics, Sound of 2008. The Times Encyclopedia of Modern Music named 19 an "essential" blue-eyed soul recording. The album was nominated for the 2008 Mercury Prize in the category of Best Album. She also won an Urban Music Award for "Best Jazz Act". She also received a Q Awards nomination in the category of Breakthrough Act and a Music of Black Origin nomination in the category of Best UK Female. On 3 December 2008, the album spawned four Grammy Award nominations: Best New Artist for Adele, and Record of the Year, Song of the Year, and Best Female Pop Vocal Performance for "Chasing Pavements". The following year, she received a second consecutive nomination for Best Female Pop Vocal Performance, for "Hometown Glory", but lost to "Halo" by Beyoncé.

Year	Organization	Award	Result	Ref.
2008	Mercury Prize	Album of the Year	Nominated	
2009	European Border Breakers Award	Best Album	Won	
2012	Billboard Music Awards	Top Pop Album	Nominated	

Her success occurred simultaneously with several other British female soul singers, with the British press dubbing her a new Amy Winehouse. This was described as a third British Musical Invasion of the US. However, Adele called the comparisons between her and other female soul singers lazy, noting "we're a gender, not a genre". AllMusic wrote that "Adele is simply too magical to compare her to anyone." Following the release of her debut album 19, Kanye West and Beyoncé were among the artists vocal in their praise of her music. Beyoncé cited Adele as one of the influences for her fourth album, 4. Revisiting Adele’s debut album, 15 years on, Virgin Radio said 19 truly cemented Adele’s status as one of the most powerful voices and performers in the industry, and that her debut release was just the tip of the iceberg on one of the most incredible careers in music.

== Track listing ==
19 – Standard edition
No.	Title	Writer(s)	Producer(s)	Length
1.	"Daydreamer"	Adele Adkins	Jim Abbiss	3:41
2.	"Best for Last"	Adkins	Abbiss	4:19
3.	"Chasing Pavements"	Adkins; Eg White	White	3:31
4.	"Cold Shoulder"	Adkins; Sacha Skarbek	Mark Ronson	3:12
5.	"Crazy for You"	Adkins	Abbiss	3:28
6.	"Melt My Heart to Stone"	Adkins; White	White	3:24
7.	"First Love"	Adkins	Abbiss	3:10
8.	"Right as Rain"	Adkins; Leon Michels; Jeff Silverman; Nick Movshon; Clay Holley	Abbiss	3:17
9.	"Make You Feel My Love"	Bob Dylan	Abbiss	3:32
10.	"My Same"	Adkins	Abbiss	3:16
11.	"Tired"	Adkins; White	White	4:19
12.	"Hometown Glory"	Adkins	Abbiss	4:31
Total length:				43:40

19 – Taiwanese special edition (bonus video)
No.	Title	Director(s)	Length
13.	"Chasing Pavements"	Mathew Cullen	3:41
Total length:			47:21

19 – Taiwanese special edition (bonus single)
No.	Title	Writer(s)	Producer(s)	Length
1.	"Cold Shoulder"	Adkins; Sacha Skarbek	Ronson	3:12
2.	"Now and Then"	Adkins	Abbiss	3:24
Total length:				6:36

19 – Japanese and New Zealand edition (bonus tracks)
No.	Title	Writer(s)	Producer(s)	Length
13.	"Painting Pictures"	Adkins	Abbiss	3:34
14.	"Now and Then"	Adkins	Abbiss	3:24
15.	"That’s It, I Quit, I'm Moving On"	Del Serino; Roy Alfred	Adkins; Richard Wilkinson	2:12
Total length:				52:50

19 – US limited edition (bonus disc)
No.	Title	Writer(s)	Length
1.	"Right as Rain" (live)	Adkins; Michels; Silverman; Movshon; Holley	3:28
2.	"Melt My Heart to Stone" (live)	Adkins; White	3:21
3.	"My Same" (live)	Adkins	3:02
4.	"That's It, I Quit, I'm Moving On" (live)	Serino; Alfred	2:21
5.	"Chasing Pavements" (live)	Adkins; White	3:49
Total length:			15:21

19 – Expanded edition (bonus disc) – acoustic set live from Hotel Café in Los Angeles, California on 20 March 2008
No.	Title	Writer(s)	Length
1.	"Chasing Pavements"	Adkins; White	3:52
2.	"Melt My Heart to Stone"	Adkins; White	3:21
3.	"That's It, I Quit, I'm Moving On"	Serino; Alfred	2:07
4.	"Crazy for You"	Adkins	3:43
5.	"Right as Rain"	Adkins; Michels; Silverman; Movshon; Holley	3:32
6.	"My Same"	Adkins	3:06
7.	"Make You Feel My Love"	Dylan	3:52
8.	"Daydreamer"	Adkins	3:41
9.	"Hometown Glory"	Adkins and Stephen Thomas	3:48
10.	"Many Shades of Black" (with The Raconteurs)	Brendan Benson; Jack White	4:29
Total length:			33:31

Notes

- "Make You Feel My Love" is a Bob Dylan cover.
- "That's It, I Quit, I'm Moving On" is a Sam Cooke cover.

== Personnel ==
Adapted from AllMusic and 19's liner notes.

Musicians

- Jim Abbiss – glockenspiel
- Adele Adkins – lead vocals, guitar (on "Daydreamer", "Crazy for You", and "My Same"), bass guitar (on "Best for Last" and "Make You Feel My Love"), celesta (on "First Love"), cowbell (on "Right as Rain")
- Matt Allchin – guitar
- Pete Biggins – drums, percussion (on "Cold Shoulder")
- Neil Cowley – piano, Hammond organ, Wurlitzer
- Rosie Danvers – string arrangements
- Tom Driessler – bass, bass guitar, tambourine
- Chris Elliott – string arrangements, string conductor
- Steven Holness – keyboards, piano
- Sam Koppelman – glockenspiel
- Life Gospel Choir – backing vocals
- Wil Malone – string arrangements, string conductor, string writing
- Perry Montague-Mason – strings
- Jack Penate – backing vocals
- Seb Rochford – drums (on "My Same")
- Louis "Kayel" Sharpe – drums (on "Right As Rain")
- Jason Silver – keyboards
- Ben Thomas – guitar
- Michael Tighe – guitar
- Eg White – performer, string arrangements
- Stuart Zender – bass

Production

- Jim Abbiss – mixing, producer
- Helen Atkinson – assistant engineer
- Loz Brazil – mixing
- Joshua Burton – photography
- John Carey – photography
- Tom Elmhirst – mixing
- Simon Hayes – mixing assistant
- Liam Howe – programming
- Serge Krebs – assistant engineer, mixing assistant
- Matt Lawrence – engineer
- Phil Lee – art direction, design, photography
- Archibald Alexander MacKenzie – assistant engineer, mixing assistant
- Dom Morley – engineer
- Dan Parry – mixing assistant
- Matt Paul – assistant
- Fergus Peterkin – mixing assistant
- Steve Price – string engineer
- Mark Ronson – producer
- Hege Saebjornsen – cover photo
- Eg White – arranger, producer
- Richard Wilkinson – engineer, mixing

== Charts ==
=== Weekly charts ===
Chart (2008–2021)	Peak position
Australian Albums (ARIA)	3
Austrian Albums (Ö3 Austria)	29
Belgian Albums (Ultratop Flanders)	9
Belgian Albums (Ultratop Wallonia)	38
Brazilian Albums (ABPD)	5
Canadian Albums (Billboard)	18
Czech Albums (ČNS IFPI)	10
Danish Albums (Hitlisten)	14
Dutch Albums (MegaCharts)	1
Finnish Albums (Suomen virallinen lista)	26
French Albums (SNEP)	15
German Albums (Offizielle Top 100)	15
German Independent Albums (Top 20 Independent)	6
Greek International Albums (IFPI Greece)	12
Hungarian Albums (MAHASZ)	25
Irish Albums (IRMA)	2
Italian Albums (FIMI)	20
Mexican Albums (Top 100 Mexico)	35
Japanese Albums (Oricon)	38
New Zealand Albums (RIANZ)	3
Norwegian Albums (VG-lista)	7
Polish Albums (ZPAV)	9
Portuguese Albums (AFP)	27
Russian Albums (2M)	15
Slovenian Albums (IFPI)	8
South Korean Albums (Gaon)	52
South Korean International Albums (Gaon)	6
Scottish Albums (OCC)	1
Spanish Albums (Promusicae)	5
Swedish Albums (Sverigetopplistan)	11
Swiss Albums (Schweizer Hitparade)	15
UK Independent Albums (OCC)	1
UK Albums (OCC)	1
US Billboard 200	4
US Independent Albums (Billboard)	13

=== Year-end charts ===
Chart (2008)	Position
Belgian Albums (Ultratop Flanders)	74
Dutch Albums (MegaCharts)	12
European Albums (Billboard)	28
French Albums (SNEP)	166
Swiss Albums (Schweizer Hitparade)	95
UK Albums (OCC)	16
US Billboard 200	197

Chart (2009)	Position
Dutch Albums (MegaCharts)	1
European Top 100 Albums (Billboard)	100
UK Albums (OCC)	158
US Billboard 200	62

Chart (2010)	Position
Dutch Albums (MegaCharts)	77
UK Albums (OCC)	85

Chart (2011)	Position
Australian Albums (ARIA)	11
Dutch Albums (MegaCharts)	2
German Albums (Offizielle Top 100)	45
Irish Albums (IRMA)	4
New Zealand Albums (RIANZ)	8
Polish Albums (ZPAV)	60
Spanish Albums (PROMUSICAE)	38
UK Albums (OCC)	4
US Billboard 200	37

Chart (2012)	Position
Argentine Albums (CAPIF)	34
Australian Albums (ARIA)	70
Belgian Midprice Albums (Ultratop Flanders)	1
Belgian Midprice Albums (Ultratop Wallonia)	1
Dutch Albums (MegaCharts)	51
German Albums (Offizielle Top 100)	94
Hungarian Albums (MAHASZ)	96
Italian Albums (FIMI)	75
New Zealand Albums (RIANZ)	31
Polish Albums (ZPAV)	5
Spanish Albums (PROMUSICAE)	19
UK Albums (OCC)	43
US Billboard 200	16
US Catalog Albums (Billboard)	1
Worldwide Albums (IFPI)	24

Chart (2013)	Position
Belgian Midprice Albums (Ultratop Flanders)	3
Belgian Midprice Albums (Ultratop Wallonia)	6
US Billboard 200	171

Chart (2015)	Position
South Korean International Albums (Gaon)	34

Chart (2016)	Position
Australian Albums (ARIA)	93
Danish Albums (Hitlisten)	87
US Billboard 200	126

Chart (2017)	Position
Australian Albums (ARIA)	98
South Korean International Albums (Gaon)	68

Chart (2021)	Position
Belgian Albums (Ultratop Flanders)	186

=== Decade-end charts ===
Chart (2010–2019)	Position
Australian Albums (ARIA)	36
UK Albums (OCC)	13
US Billboard 200	81

== Certifications and sales ==
Certifications for 19
Region	Certification	Certified units/sales
Australia (ARIA)	2× Platinum	214,000
Belgium (BRMA)	2× Platinum	60,000^{*}
Canada (Music Canada)	4× Platinum	400,000^{‡}
Denmark (IFPI Danmark)	3× Platinum	60,000^{‡}
Finland (Musiikkituottajat)	Gold	15,709
Germany (BVMI)	Platinum	200,000^{^}
Italy (FIMI) sales since 2009	Platinum	50,000^{*}
Mexico (AMPROFON)	Gold	40,000^{^}
Netherlands (NVPI)	3× Platinum	350,000
New Zealand (RMNZ)	4× Platinum	60,000^{‡}
Spain (Promusicae)	Platinum	80,000^{^}
Switzerland (IFPI Switzerland)	Platinum	30,000^{^}
United Kingdom (BPI)	9× Platinum	2,700,000^{‡}
United States (RIAA)	4× Platinum	4,000,000^{‡}
Summaries
Europe (IFPI)	3× Platinum	3,000,000^{*}
Worldwide	—	8,500,000
^{*} Sales figures based on certification alone.^{^} Shipments figures based on certification alone.^{‡} Sales+streaming figures based on certification alone.

== Release history ==
Release dates and format(s) for 19
Region	Date	Format	Label
Europe	25 January 2008	CD; digital download	XL
Australia	26 January 2008	CD; digital download	XL
United Kingdom	28 January 2008	CD; digital download	XL
United States	10 June 2008	CD; digital download	Columbia
Poland	24 November 2008	CD; digital download	XL
Brazil	6 June 2011	CD; digital download	Sony
China	13 March 2013	CD	星外星唱片 (Starsing)

== See also ==
- List of best-selling albums of the 21st century in the United Kingdom
- List of best-selling albums of the 2010s in the United Kingdom
