= Just for Laughs =

Comedy festival held in Montreal, Canada

Just for Laughs Juste pour rire
- "Victor", the Just for Laughs trademark mascot
- Genre: Comedy festival
- Locations: Montreal, Quebec, Canada
- Years active: 1982–2024, 2025–present
- Founded: July 14, 1982; 44 years ago
- Most recent: July 15–26, 2026
- Next event: July 2027
- Website: montreal.hahaha.com

Just for Laughs (French: Juste pour rire) is a comedy festival that is held every July in Montreal, Quebec, Canada. Founded in 1982 by Gilbert Rozon, it is the largest international comedy festival in the world. In addition to the festivals themselves, Just for Laughs also developed, produced, and distributed other forms of comedy entertainment, such as television programming.

In March 2024, it was announced that Just for Laughs as a business went bankrupt, and consequently, all of its festivals were cancelled. The media speculated about its future in Montreal, and how it could be uncertain. In May, however, ComediHa, another Quebec-based company specializing in comedy, announced its acquisition of several assets, including the festival. It was then announced that the anglophone festival would go on, albeit smaller, and without the usual televised galas.

== History ==
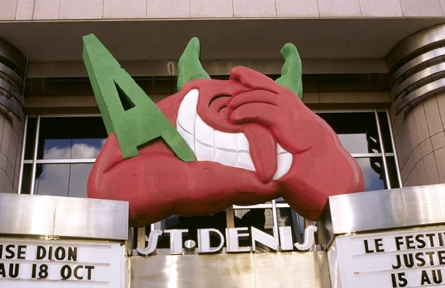
Saint-Denis Theatre, the theatre where the festival used to film until 2010

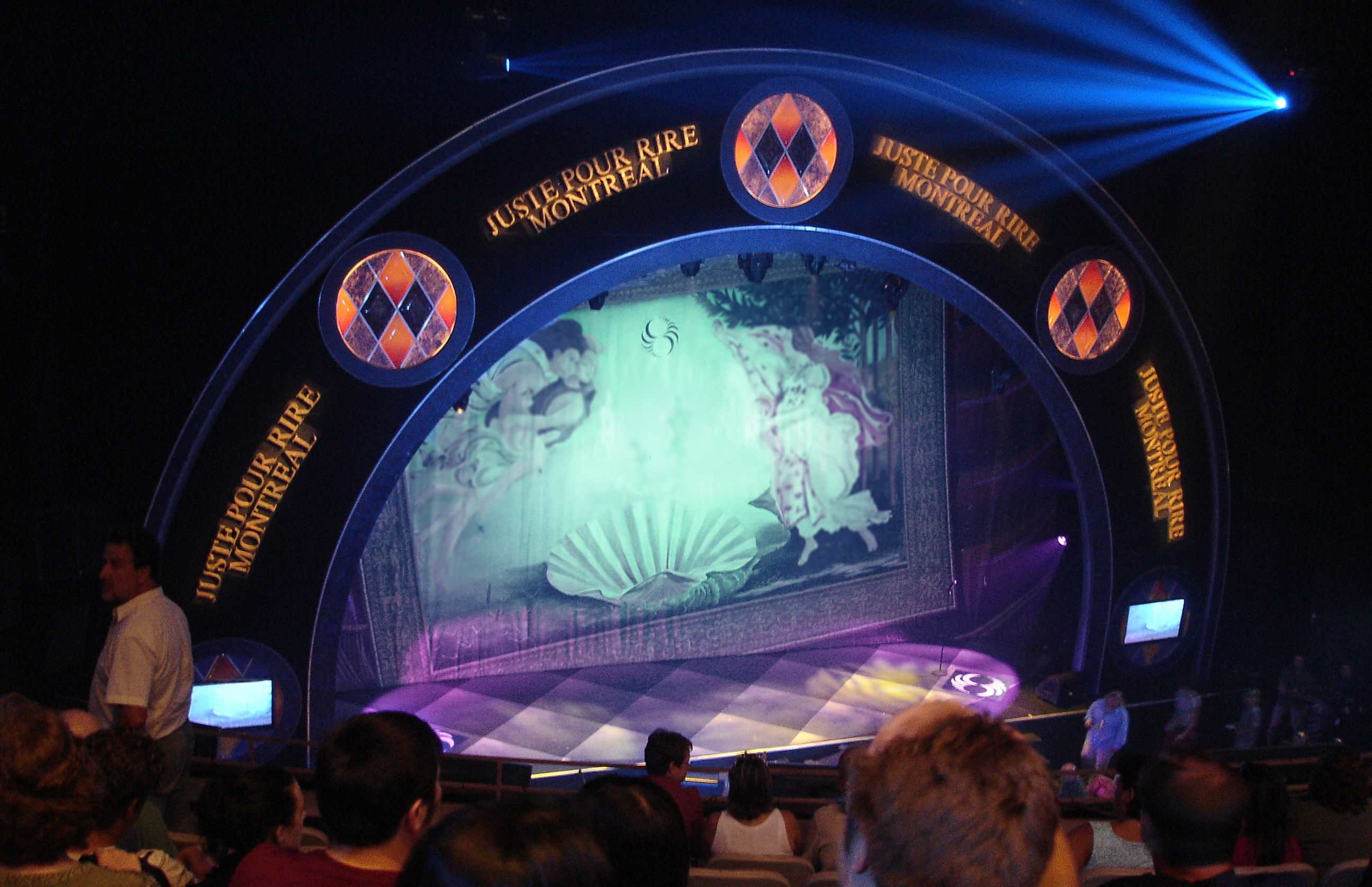
Inside Saint-Denis Theatre, 2005 Just for Laughs festival

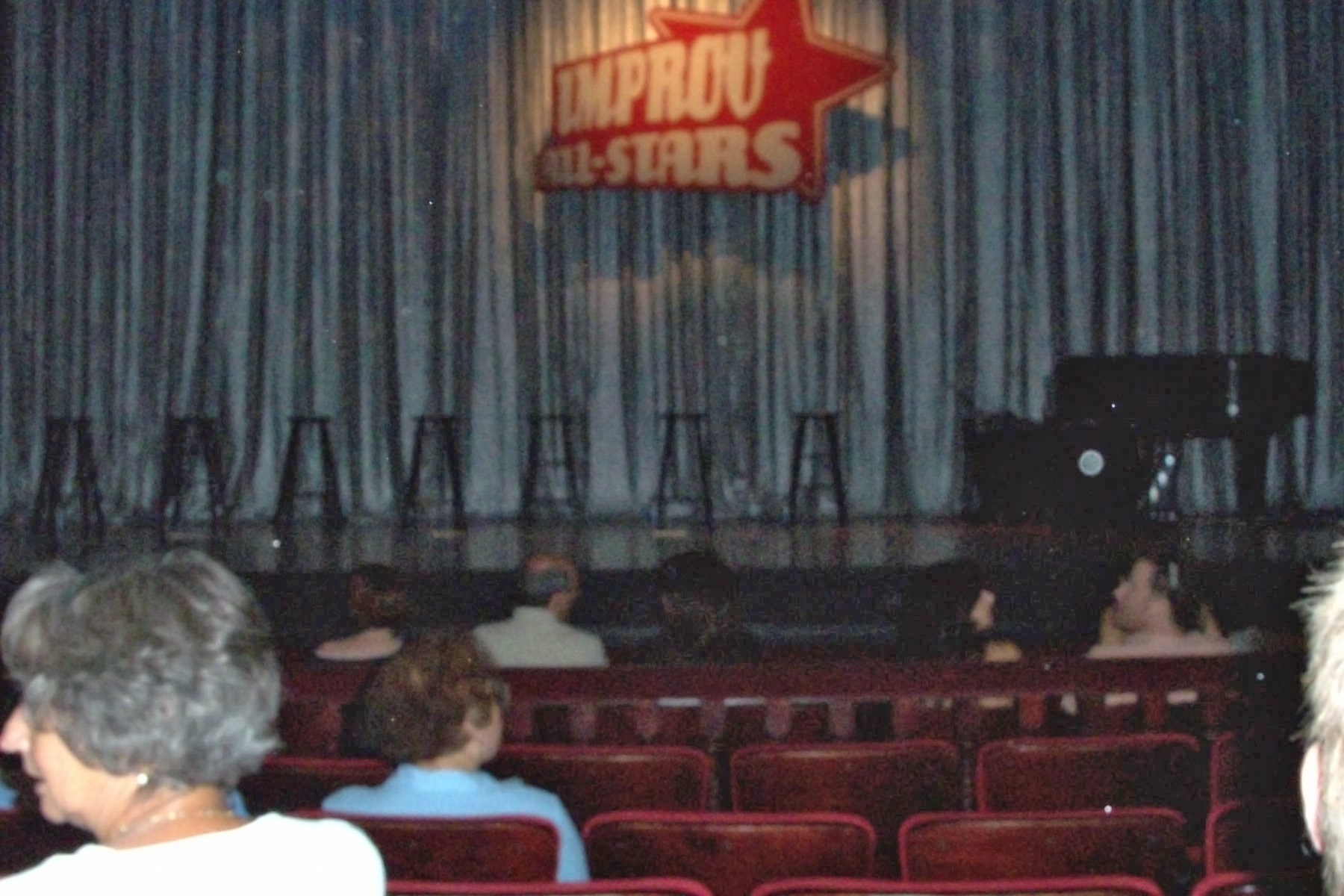
Improv All Stars stage, Just for Laughs festival 2003

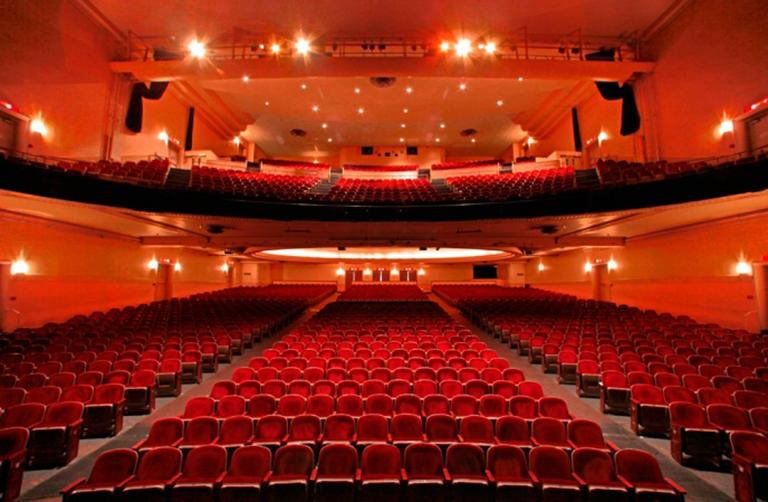
Principal shooting set, as of 2014

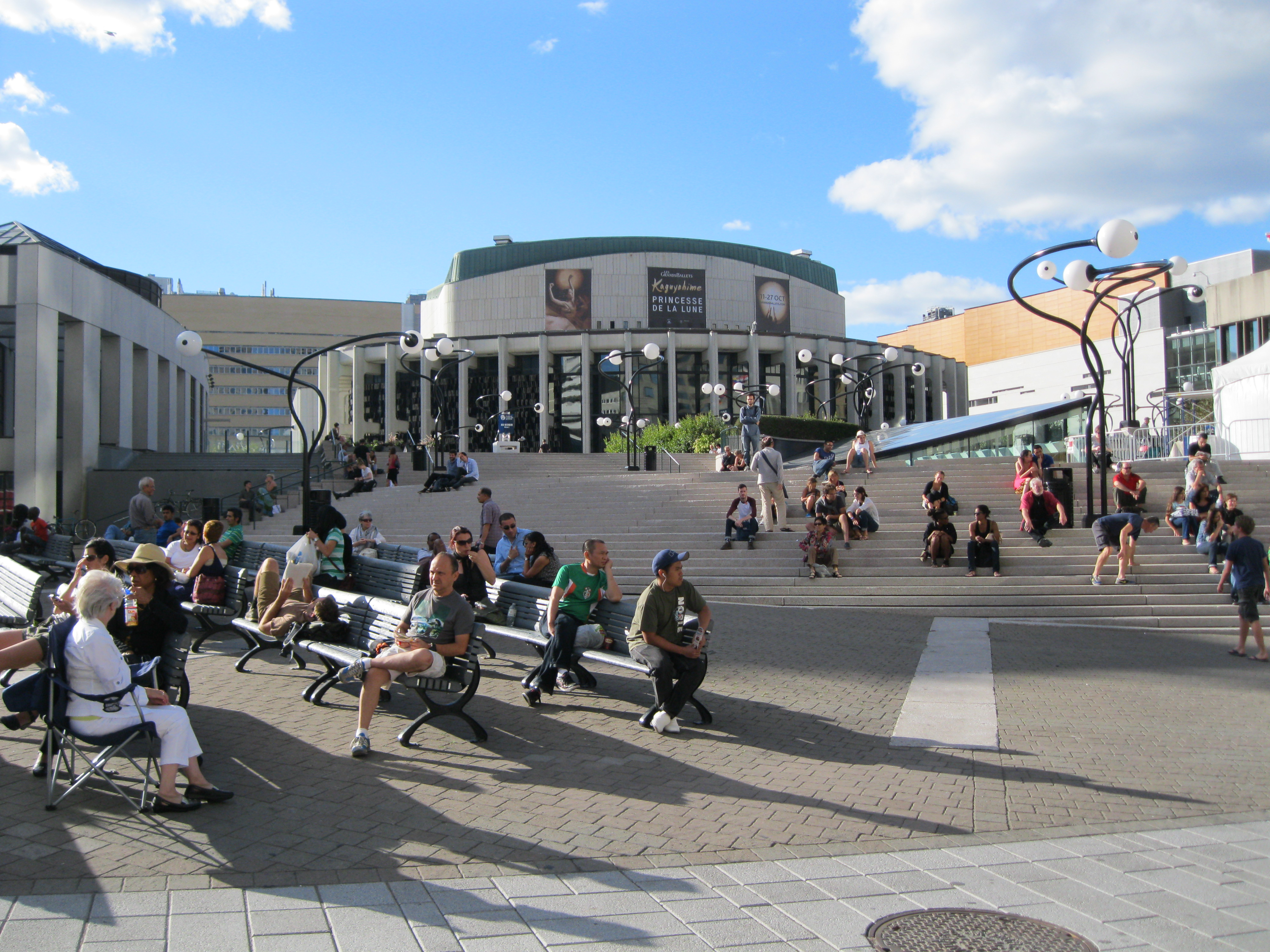
Place des Arts, this is where the festival previously filmed

Just for Laughs was formed in 1982 as a two-day French-language event. In 1985, Andy Nulman joined the festival's staff and introduced English-language events as well; under Nulman's stewardship, the festival increased to a full month, with French-speaking performers during the first half, and English speakers in the second half. International and non-verbal acts (acrobats, pantomimes, etc.) are scattered throughout the program. Between 1986 and 2021, the Just for Laughs name went fully stylized to Just for laughs, and on 2021 as JUST FOR LAUGHS.

In 1999, Nulman left the festival's full-time employ; however, he directed its major Gala Shows at the Saint-Denis Theatre every July, and remained on the board of directors of the festival's parent company. After an 11-year absence, Nulman returned to Just for Laughs in July 2010 as president of Festivals and Television.

Each day, performers, "New Vaudevillians" and other acts both vocal and visual perform throughout the city, particularly in the "Latin Quarter"—an area known for its theatres, cafés and boutique shopping. In the evenings, the nightclubs and live venue theatres offer special programs supporting the performers.

Although Just for Laughs attracts spectators from around the world, many of those in the audience are talent scouts, booking agents, producers, and managers from the entertainment industry. Performing at the festival is an opportunity for undiscovered talent to showcase their act in front of industry professionals.

The comedy film festival Comedia is also held during the Just for Laughs festival. Awards are given for feature and short films. In 2005, Comedia screened 125 short films from around the world as well as several feature-length films.

In February 1994, the festival sponsored a splinter project in Hollywood, Florida. That coastal area is a favourite winter destination for Quebecers who head south to vacation in the warmer weather. The event, Juste pour rire—en vacances (Just for Laughs—On Vacation), was held in the Young Circle Park, an outdoor venue with an urban park setting.

In July 2007, Just for Laughs celebrated its 25th edition, launching a festival in Toronto, Ontario.

In 2009, a U.S. edition of the festival was held in Chicago, sponsored by U.S. cable network TBS.

On November 24, 2010, it was announced that they have to move the Just for Laughs galas to Place des Arts and that the 2011 festival in the Saint-Denis Theatre would be recycled due to budget cuts.

In July 2014, Just for Laughs London was held at Russell Square.

On April 3, 2020, it was announced that the 2020 edition of Just for Laughs would be postponed until the fall due to the COVID-19 pandemic. It was scheduled to run from September 29 to October 11, 2020, however, on July 21, 2020, organizers reversed their decision and cancelled the event. To fill the gap, they choose for a series of virtual performances that will run online (via the Internet only), for two days, on October 9 and 10, 2020.

=== Sale to ICM Partners, Bell and the Molson family ===
On October 18, 2017, festival president and founder Gilbert Rozon resigned from his position following allegations of sexual misconduct. Rozon later announced that he would sell the festival. As per a partnership with the conglomerate, Quebecor was given right of first refusal to counter competing offers. The company, however, declined. On March 21, 2018, it was announced that the entire company would be acquired by a partnership between U.S.-based talent agency ICM Partners and Ontario comedian Howie Mandel. In their announcement of the purchase, it was stated that Just for Laughs would remain based in Montreal (with Mandel considering the event to be a key component of local culture), and that there would be no changes in its management or operations. It was also stated that the partnership was seeking other local partners. Quebecor subsequently announced that it would become a "founding partner" of Le Grand Montréal Comédie Fest—a competing event established by a group of Quebecois comedians as a competitor in the wake of the Rozon scandal. Le Grand Montréal Comédie Fest ran for two years.

In May 2018, La Presse reported that the partnership planned to sell a 51% stake in Just for Laughs to Bell Canada and Evenko (an event management company owned by the Montreal Canadiens' ownership group Groupe CH, in turn owned by the Molson family), so that the event would remain majority-owned by Canadian interests and remain eligible for government tax credits. On June 7, 2018, Just For Laughs confirmed that Bell Media and Groupe CH had acquired stakes in the festival.

In July 2022, Just for Laughs announced a line-up of 62 comedians that will be featured in the Montreal festival that will run from July 13 to 31st. This festival also marks the 40th anniversary of Just for Laughs.

=== 2024 cancellation and uncertain future ===
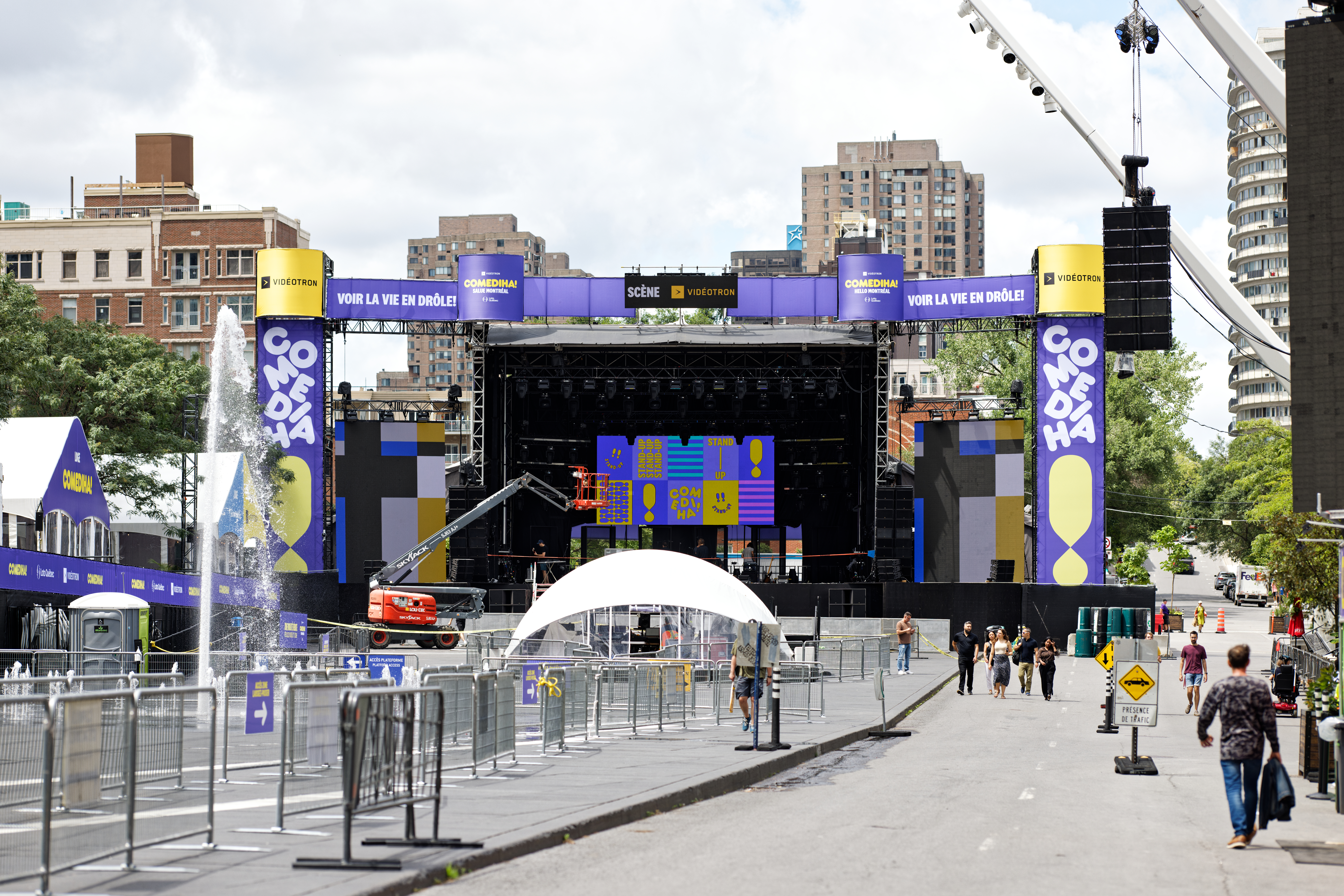
The stage set up for ComediHa! salue Montréal, including Just for Laughs-branded events, at the Place des Festivals in 2024

On March 5, 2024, it was announced the 2024 edition of the Just for Laughs festival had been canceled as Groupe Juste pour rire tried to avoid bankruptcy. The organizers attributed lost revenues during the COVID-19 pandemic, streaming services, and reduced budgets at networks to the company's collapse. A month later, it was exposed that the company was $22.5 million in debt, with an additional $3.4 million on top of that owed to various creditors. It was also revealed the festival lost $800,000 in an email phishing scheme in 2023.

In May, Just for Laughs announced that it was selling some of its assets to ComediHa!, a company which organizes similar comedy festivals in other Quebec cities. In an interview in July, ComediaHa!'s CEO, Sylvain Parent-Bédard, reported that the company plans to keep the Just For Laughs and Juste Pour Rire brands for the festivals, and use the ComediHa! brand for musicals, theatre, TV, and scripted shows.

== TV shows and other ==
In addition to the festivals themselves, Just for Laughs also develops, produces, and distributes other forms of comedy entertainment, from stand-up specials and variety shows to sitcoms and reality television.

For instance, tapings from festival performances have been featured in Just for Laughs-branded television programs and specials, which have aired on channels such as CBC Television, Radio-Canada, The Comedy Network, and TVA. This includes the original Just for Laughs series; Just for Laughs: Galas, a series of four galas; and a newer series that premiered in 2012, Just for Laughs: All Access.

Just for Laughs' television productions are also broadcast outside of Canada on over 150 platforms. American audiences can watch JFL programming via HBO, FOX, ABC, Comedy Central, Showtime, Hulu, and more. A UK series, also entitled Just for Laughs, aired on Channel 4 from 1987 to 1996. Just for Laughs Australia screens on the Ten Network in Australia and features highlights from the festival with an emphasis on Australian comedy performers.

The festival has also lent its name to a hidden camera comedy series, Just for Laughs Gags, which has also been aired by various Canadian channels, and has been sold internationally. Adapted from Gags is Just Kidding, a show with a similar premise but with kids pulling pranks.

Just for Laughs also produces Humour Resources, a series starring Jon Dore as a retired comedian-turned-human resources manager for comedy.

In 2018, Radio-Canada and The Comedy Network (now called CTV Comedy Channel) briefly dropped all Just for Laughs programming, apparently caused by Gilbert Rozon's allegations of sexual misconduct. TVA continued to air Just for Laughs Gags, but renamed Les Gags. CBC Television still air Just for Laughs Gags with no changes. Following the festival's subsequent ownership changes, CTV Comedy and other Bell Media channels have resumed airing festival programming.

Just for Laughs also owns a record label titled JFL Originals, which publishes multi-comedian albums recorded in different cities across North America.

== Mascot ==
Victor is the mascot and logo for the comedy festival Just for Laughs. It was designed by Vittorio Fiorucci of the Canadian Design Resource company.

When the artist first created the mascot, the character's horns were coloured blue. However, when Vittorio's blue marker had run out of shades of blue, the mascot's horns became red.

His catchphrase, as heard at the end of most Just for Laughs television broadcasts from their inception until 2021, is "Mommy, it's over!" ("Maman, c'est fini!" in French).

In 2005, the character was redesigned by animator Alan Best at the behest of advertising agency Cossette as part of a comprehensive graphic overhaul of the Just For Laughs brand.

In 2007, he is redesigned again by Patrick Dea. On the same year, "Rose" was created, a character to be the wife of "Victor".

In 2023, Victor was absent from all visual material related to the festival, but was brought back in 2025 as a logo. The new logo, introduced at December 2025, was similarly identical to the 2006-2021 logo which consisted of a rectangle with Victor's horns and color code, displayed with the festival's name on it.

== See also ==
- Culture of Quebec
- Edinburgh Festival Fringe
- Just for Laughs Museum (closed)
- List of Quebec comedians
- List of Quebec television series
- Melbourne International Comedy Festival
- Television of Quebec
