= Just for Laughs Museum =

Museum in Montreal, Canada

Coordinates: 45°30′43.5″N 73°34′06″W

Just for Laughs Museum / Muséé Juste pour rire
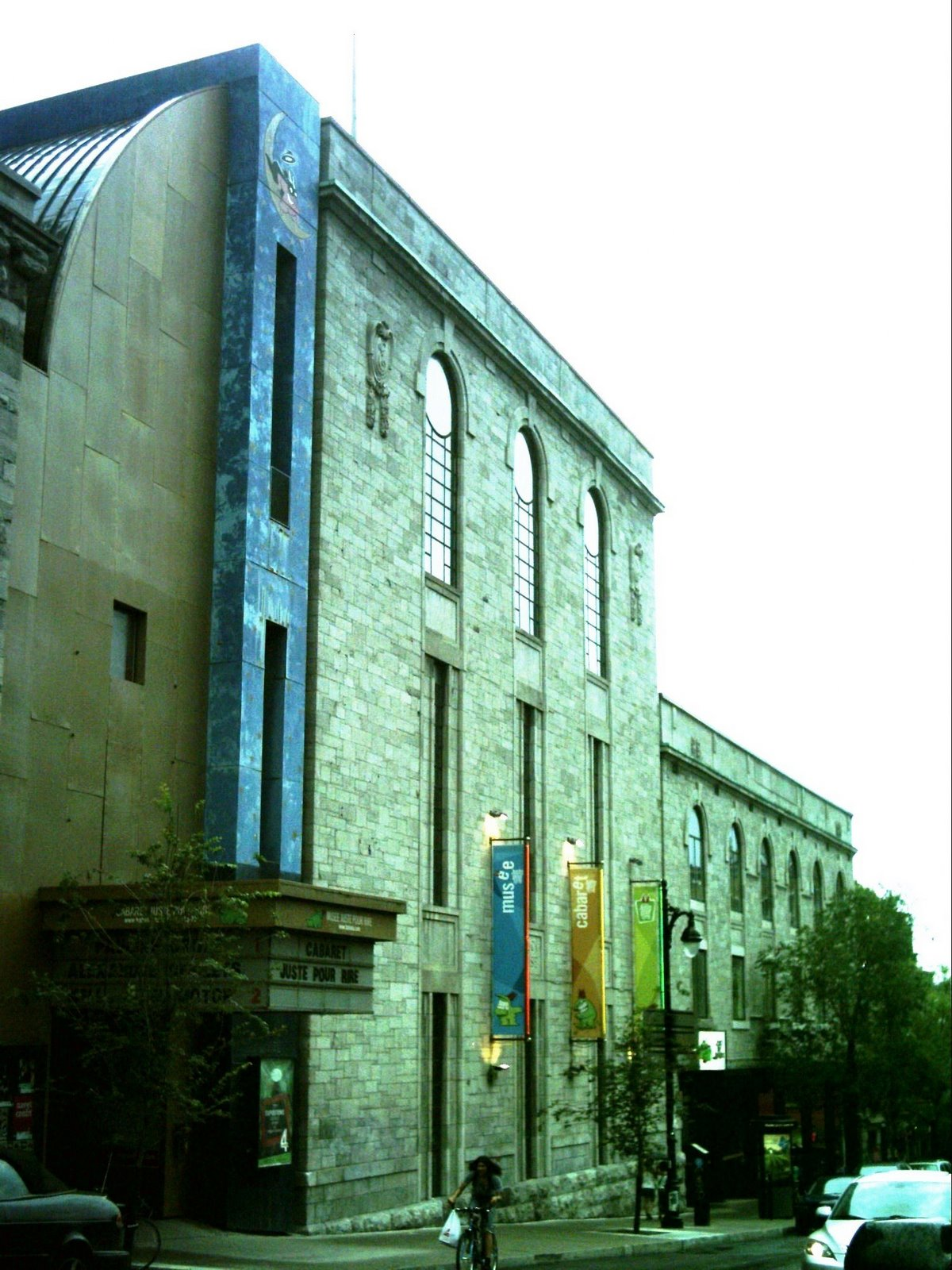
- Established: 1993
- Dissolved: 2011
- Location: 2111, boulevard Saint Laurent, Montreal, Quebec, Canada.
- Type: Humour
- Website: musee.hahaha.com/accueil.jsp

The Just for Laughs Museum (French: Musée Juste pour rire) was a Canadian museum that opened in 1993, dedicated to humour (mainly stand-up comedy) located in Montreal, Quebec. The museum closed in 2011. It had been visited by more than two million people since its opening.

== History ==
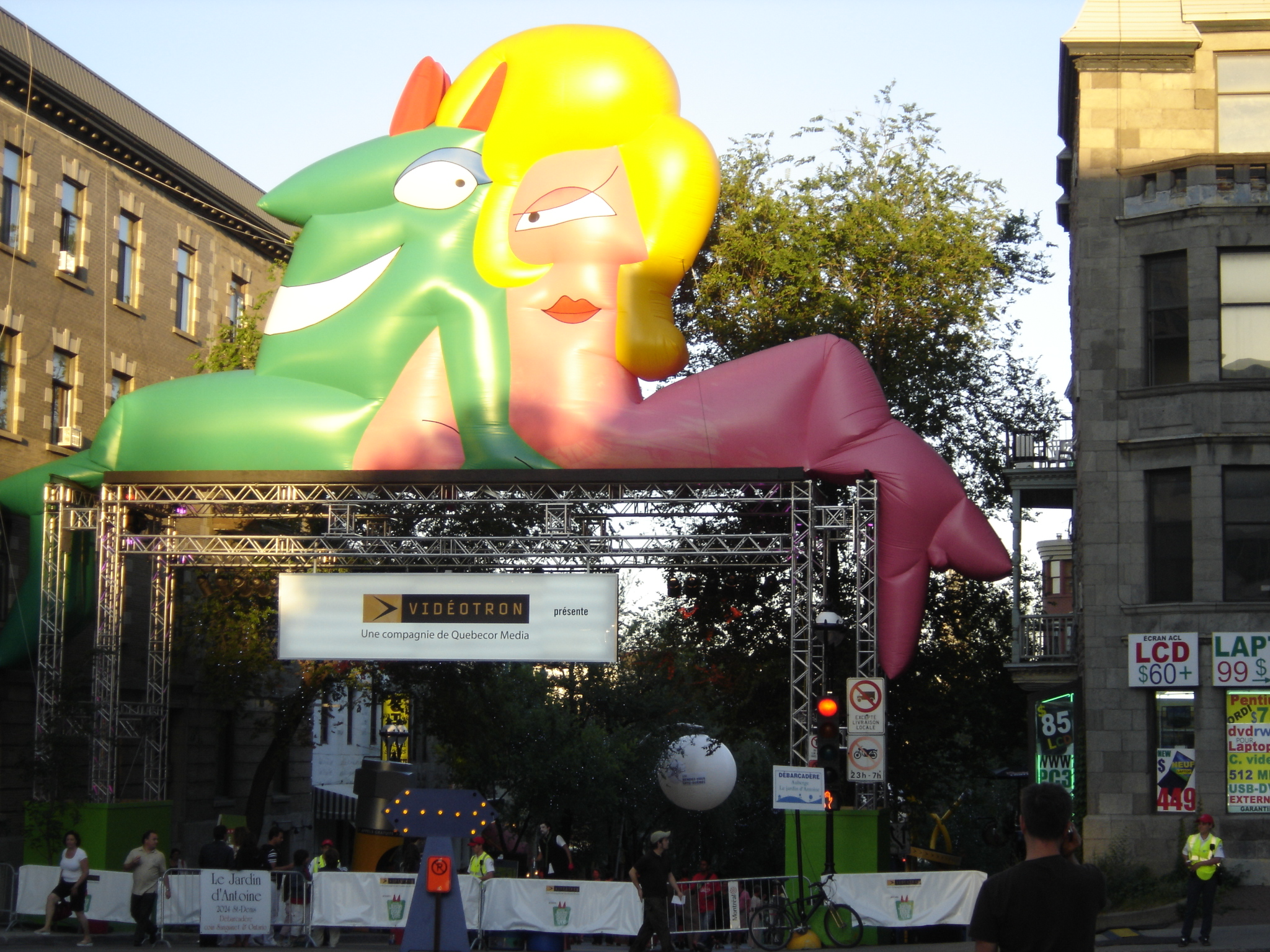
Inflatable Victor with his wife, Rose

The Just for Laughs Museum was created by Gilbert Rozon, founder of the Just for Laughs festival in the same city 10 years earlier. Opened in 1993, the museum was a venue for all things funny with displays, exhibitions, and a multi-functional space for the presentation of public, private or professional events. The museum was located at 2111, boulevard Saint Laurent (2111, Saint Laurent Boulevard), Montreal, QC, Canada. Perhaps coincidentally, St-Laurent is the French name of Lawrence of Rome, the patron saint of comedians.

The museum was affiliated with the Canadian Museums Association, the Canadian Heritage Information Network, and the Virtual Museum of Canada.

== Closure ==
The museum closed its doors permanently on January 1, 2011, due to loss of profits associated with the maintenance costs for the over one hundred-year-old building.
