= ITunes Festival: London 2011 (Adele EP) =

iTunes Festival: London 2011

EP by Adele
- Released: 13 July 2011
- Recorded: 7 July 2011
- Genre: Pop
- Length: 34:56
- Label: XL

Adele chronology
21 (2011)	iTunes Festival: London 2011 (2011)	Live at the Royal Albert Hall (2011)

iTunes Festival: London 2011 is the second extended play (EP) by British singer Adele, released in 2011. The EP was recorded live during the iTunes Festival London 2011 at The Roundhouse in London, England, United Kingdom.

== Track listing ==
iTunes Festival: London 2011 track listing
No.	Title	Length
1.	"One and Only"	5:43
2.	"Don’t You Remember"	4:13
3.	"Rumour Has It"	3:48
4.	"Take It All"	4:02
5.	"I Can't Make You Love Me"	3:34
6.	"Rolling in the Deep"	5:21
Total length:		34:56

== Chart performance ==
Chart (2011)	Peak position
French Albums (SNEP)	112
Irish Albums (IRMA)	45
UK Albums (Official Charts)	74
US Billboard 200	50

== Release history ==
Region	Date	Format	Label
United Kingdom	13 July 2011	Digital download	XL
