= Classic Grand =

Live event venue and nightclub in Glasgow, Scotland

Coordinates: 55.85795°N 4.25730°W

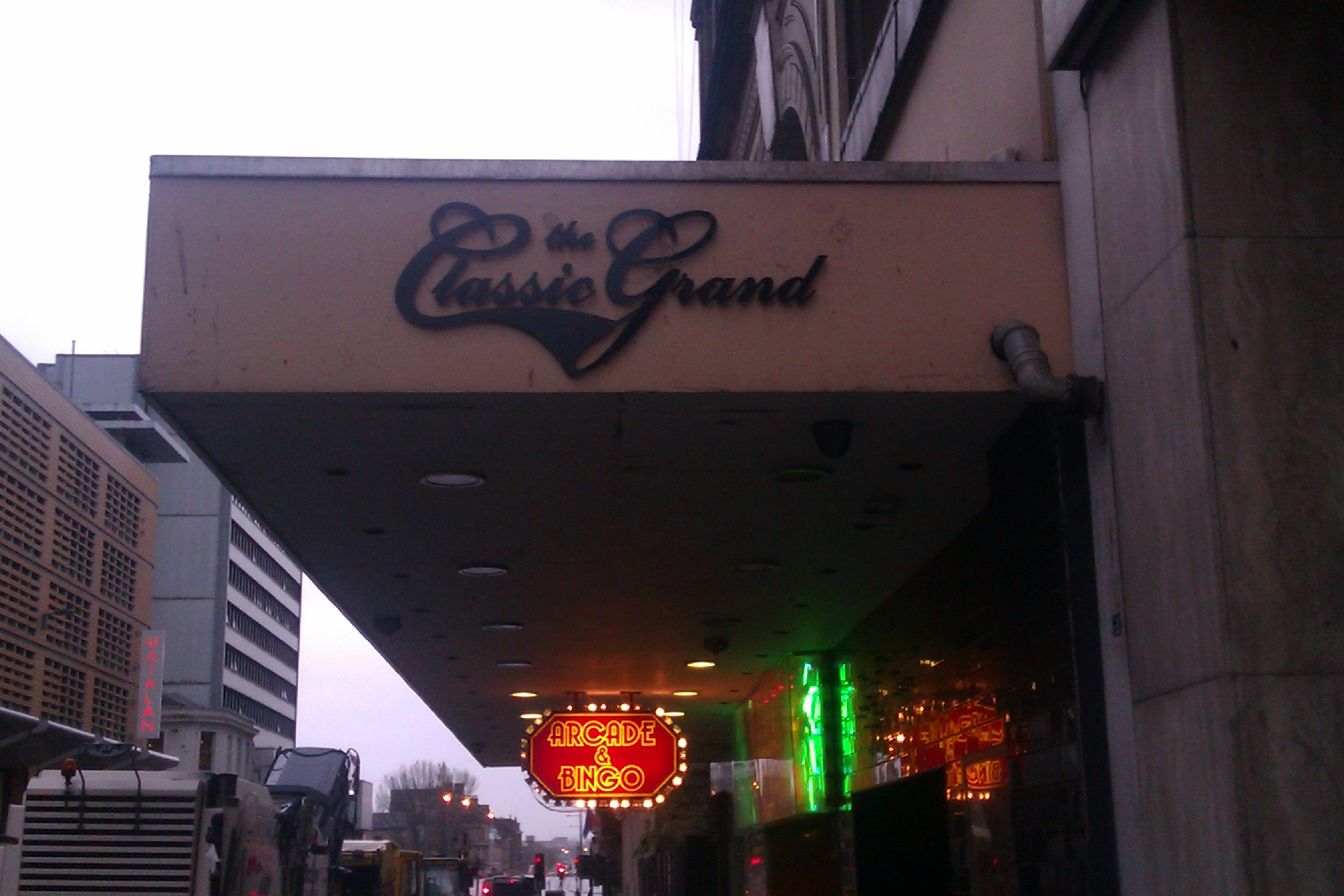
The Classic Grand

The Classic Grand is a live event venue and nightclub in Glasgow, Scotland. Located on Jamaica Street, it features many live bands and also sometimes hosts specialist events. It shows a variety of both local and well-known acts.

== History ==
The building was originally constructed around 1860 as a 5-storey commercial warehouse. The cinema conversion was designed by William B Whitie, and utilised the basement to the second storey. It opened as the Grand Central cinema in 1915, seating 750. The venue was closed in 1966, and was unused until it reopened in 1973 under the name Classic Grand, seating 365. It became the Cannon-Grand in 1985, and finally closed as a cinema in 1992. The building was used as an amusement arcade before being reopened as the Classic Grand Live Music Venue. The interior, although badly damaged by a fire in 2001, retains some of its original Art Deco features. The structure has been protected as a category B listed building since December 1970.

== Previous acts ==
Some well-known acts that have played at the Classic Grand include 3OH!3, Adele, Alphabeat, Amy Macdonald, Autumn in Disguise, Bailey McConnell, Clutch, Combichrist, Dead Swans, Devlin, Diana Vickers, Dimmu Borgir, Emily Middlemas, Feeder, Glasvegas, Grandmaster Flash, Hayseed Dixie, Janet Devlin, Kate Nash, Lordi, Misfits, Nicholas McDonald, Plan B, Seasick Steve, Solange Knowles, Spock's Beard, Stereophonics, The LaFontaines, The Presets, Toyah Willcox, VNV Nation & Wheatus.
