= Hometown Glory =

2007 single by Adele

Single by Adele

from the album 19
- B-side: "Best for Last"; "Fool That I Am" (live)
- Released: 22 October 2007
- Recorded: 2007
- Studio: Angel (London); RAK (London)
- Length: 4:31 (album version); 3:37 (radio edit)
- Label: Pacemaker; XL
- Songwriter: Adele Adkins
- Producer: Jim Abbiss

Adele singles chronology
"Hometown Glory" (2007)	"Chasing Pavements" (2008)

Music video
- "Hometown Glory" on YouTube

"Hometown Glory" is a song by English singer-songwriter Adele. It was released on 22 October 2007 in the United Kingdom as her debut single, and appears on her debut studio album 19 (2008). In 2008, the song was re-released as her fourth single. Adele wrote "Hometown Glory" within 10 minutes, when she was only 16 years old, after her mother tried to persuade her to leave her home suburb of West Norwood in London for university. It is the first song that Adele wrote.

In 2007, "Hometown Glory" was released on singer Jamie T's Pacemaker Recordings label as a limited edition 7" vinyl single, of which only 500 copies were made. The song failed to chart initially. However, due to the many downloads of the song during the release week of Adele's 19, the song managed to chart inside the UK Singles Chart top 40 for the first time. At the 52nd Annual Grammy Awards, the song received a nomination for Best Female Pop Vocal Performance.

== Background and composition ==
"Hometown Glory" was re-released on 21 July 2008 as the follow-up to second single "Cold Shoulder". The song was added to BBC Radio 1's B-list on 18 June 2008, and moved up to the station's A-list on 2 July 2008. Its B-side now featured Adele's brand-new cover of the Etta James song "Fool That I Am", which was recorded during a live performance in Cambridge. The song was later released in 2008 as Adele's debut single for the US market. Due to its popularity in the UK, which resulted in it charting inside the top 40 twice on download sales alone, it was re-released as the third single (fourth including the original single release) from the album on 21 July 2008. As of July 2008, the song has become Adele's third consecutive top 20 hit single.

The song is played in the key of B♭ minor with an intro at a tempo of 60 beats per minute, before changing to 124 beats per minute. Adele's vocal range is D♭3–A5. "Hometown Glory" follows the chord progression B♭m(i) – D♭/A♭(III) – D♭/F(III) – G♭maj7/B♭(VI M7).

== Chart performance ==
On 13 April 2008, the song entered the UK Singles Chart at No. 32, following its showcase on an episode of the British television show Skins. On 6 July 2008, "Hometown Glory" re-entered the chart at No. 74 and then climbed to No. 49 the following week. It eventually peaked at No. 19 on 27 July 2008, following its physical release.

== Accolades ==
"Hometown Glory" received a nomination at the 52nd Grammy Awards in the Best Female Pop Vocal Performance category but lost out to Beyoncé's "Halo".

Year	Organization	Award	Result	Ref.
2010	Grammy Awards	Best Female Pop Vocal Performance	Nominated	

== Music video ==
The initial limited-edition vinyl release of "Hometown Glory" does not have a promo video. In June 2008, XL released a Paul Dugdale-directed live video for the single's re-release. In April 2009, Columbia finally released a proper promo video directed by Rocky Schenck and filmed at Sony Pictures Studios on Stage 29. The video shows Adele singing while backdrops of American cities are moved around her.

== In the media ==
On 7 April 2008, "Hometown Glory" was featured in the critically acclaimed, British teen drama series Skins, resulting in the song re-entering the UK Singles Chart top 40 at No. 32. Later that month, on 24 April 2008, the song was featured in episode 5.15 of the American TV drama One Tree Hill. On 22 May 2008, the song was featured in the season four finale of US TV series Grey's Anatomy. According to Adele's manager Jonathan Dickins, the powerful music supervisor Alexandra Patsavas chose the song after seeing Adele perform it at the Hotel Café in Los Angeles, following a recommendation by Columbia Records' creative licensing staffer Jonathan Palmer. On 10 June 2008 and then again on 13 October 2008, the song was used in popular UK soap Hollyoaks. It was used yet again in Hollyoaks in the 10 November 2010 episode that featured the death of character Steph Cunningham. The opening of the song played as Steph said goodbye to her on-screen husband Gilly Roach, choosing to perish in a house fire rather than face death from the cervical cancer doctors had informed her was terminal. The episode was a season-high for Hollyoaks, viewed by 2.12 million viewers (including timeshift and E4 figures, 0.7, a high for the channel) – a high figure for a non-BBC or ITV show.

On 2 July 2008, it was featured on season four of So You Think You Can Dance in a Mia Michaels' contemporary dance by Katee Shean and eventual winner, Joshua Allen. It also featured in a season-two episode of Secret Diary of a Call Girl. A remixed version of the song was featured in the superhero drama-comedy Misfits. The track has also been used on advertisements and promotional scenes for the UK soap Coronation Street. The song was featured in a season-one episode of the American teen drama series 90210. It was also featured on the reality TV show The Hills.

"Hometown Glory" has also been sampled by other artists, including by the Mississippi rapper Big K.R.I.T. on his single "Hometown Hero", in Big Sean's song "Hometown" from his mixtape Finally Famous Vol. 3: BIG, by French rapper La Fouine on his song "Vecu" featuring French rapper Kamelancien, by The OCS on his song "Hometown" featuring Glasses Malone, Jay Rock and XO, by the Montreal rapper Boy6lue in his song "Hometown" featuring Two Two, and by Minneapolis hippy-hop artist Mod Sun on his song "The Same Way".

Adele's song has been used in various soap operas in accompaniment to the deaths of Danielle Jones, Steph Roach, Joe McIntyre, Archie Mitchell, and Bradley Branning. It has also been used in EastEnders: Revealed. Various reality singing and talent shows use the song in between performances such as The X Factor in the United Kingdom and in Australia, Britain's Got Talent, and Australia's Got Talent. The song was used memorably at the end of Julien Temple's 2012 documentary London: The Modern Babylon (which debuted on BBC TV in August 2012 to coincide with the end of the Olympic Games); the film also contains other London anthems including "London Calling" by the Clash and "Waterloo Sunset" by the Kinks.

On 22 February 2018, before an NHL game between the Washington Capitals and Florida Panthers, the song was played in a tribute video at BB&T Center to honor the 17 victims who were killed in the Parkland high school shooting 8 days prior.

During the free skate of both the pairs and team events at the 2018 Winter Olympics, Canadians Meagan Duhamel and Eric Radford skated to the song. "Hometown Glory" was also their winning free performance at the 2016 World Figure Skating Championships.

On 30 September 2020, the song was used during the final moments of the BBC series Ambulance.

The song was used in commercials for the 2023 NBA playoffs.

== Formats and track listings ==
=== Original release ===
7-inch vinyl

1. "Hometown Glory"
2. "Best for Last"

=== Re-release ===
CD single

1. "Hometown Glory" – 4:32
2. "Fool That I Am" (Live) – 3:45

Digital EP

1. "Hometown Glory" – 3:40
2. "Hometown Glory" (Axwell Radio Edit) – 3:35
3. "Hometown Glory" (Axwell Club Mix) – 5:11
4. "Hometown Glory" (Axwell Remode) – 5:55
5. "Hometown Glory" (High Contrast Remix) – 6:36
6. "Hometown Glory" (High Contrast Remix) [Instrumental] – 6:35

7-inch vinyl

1. "Hometown Glory" – 4:32
2. "Fool That I Am" (Live) – 3:45

12-inch vinyl

1. "Hometown Glory" (High Contrast remix)
2. "Hometown Glory" (High Contrast remix instrumental)

== Official remixes ==
- Album Version
- Single Version
- Radio Edit (Single Version – Clean with omission of word "shit")
- High Contrast Remix
- Axwell Remix
- Axwell Remode Mix
- Axwell Radio Edit

== Charts ==
=== Weekly charts ===
Weekly chart positions for "Hometown Glory"
Chart (2008–2012)	Peak position
Belgium (Ultratip Bubbling Under Flanders)	3
Belgium (Ultratip Bubbling Under Wallonia)	14
European Hot 100 Singles	58
France (SNEP)	51
Ireland (IRMA)	78
Netherlands (Dutch Top 40)	25
Netherlands (Single Top 100)	86
Scottish Singles Sales (Official Charts)	18
UK Singles (Official Charts)	19

2025 weekly chart positions for "Hometown Glory"
Chart (2025)	Peak position
Netherlands (Single Top 100)	53
Norway (VG-lista)	89
Sweden (Sverigetopplistan)	57
UK Singles (Official Charts)	29

=== Year-end charts ===
Year-end chart position for "Hometown Glory"
Country (2008)	Position
United Kingdom	162

== Certifications ==
Certifications for "Hometown Glory"
Region	Certification	Certified units/sales
Canada (Music Canada)	Platinum	80,000^{‡}
Denmark (IFPI Danmark)	Gold	45,000^{‡}
New Zealand (RMNZ)	Platinum	30,000^{‡}
United Kingdom (BPI)	2× Platinum	1,200,000^{‡}
^{‡} Sales+streaming figures based on certification alone.
