= That's It, I Quit, I'm Movin' On =

Single by Sam Cooke

from the album Twistin' the Night Away
- B-side: "What Do You Say"
- Released: 14 February 1961
- Recorded: 30 January 1961; RCA Studio A (New York City)
- Genre: Rhythm and blues; soul
- Length: 2:27
- Label: RCA Victor
- Songwriter(s): Roy Alfred; Del Serino
- Producer(s): Hugo & Luigi

Sam Cooke singles chronology
"Sad Mood" (1960)	"That's It, I Quit, I'm Movin' On" (1961)	"Cupid" (1961)

"That's It—I Quit—I'm Movin' On" is a song recorded by American singer Sam Cooke, released on 14 February 1961 by RCA Victor. Produced by Hugo & Luigi and arranged and conducted by Sammy Lowe, the song was a top 30 hit on Billboard's Hot R&B Sides chart and the Billboard Hot 100.

== Personnel ==
Credits adapted from the liner notes to the 2003 compilation Portrait of a Legend: 1951–1964.

- Sam Cooke – vocals
- Ernie Hayes – piano

== Charts and certifications ==
=== Weekly charts ===
Chart (1961)	Peak position
US Billboard Hot 100	31
US Hot R&B Sides (Billboard)	25
