= Highline Ballroom =

Music venue and nightclub in New York City

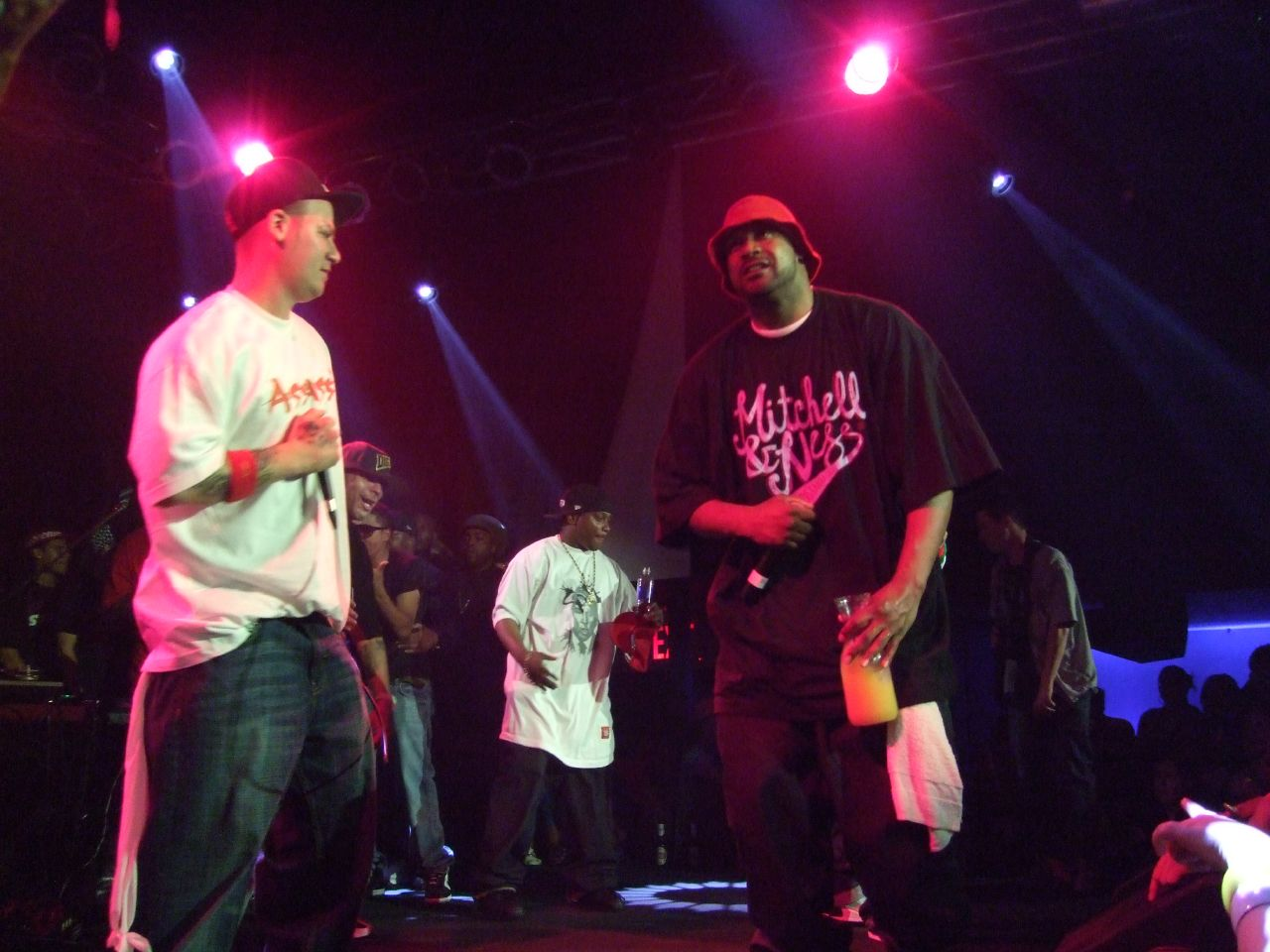
- Ghostface at the Highline Ballroom in New York
- Interactive map of Highline Ballroom
- Address: 431 West 16th Street
- Location: Manhattan, New York City, New York, United States
- Coordinates: 40.74300°N 74.00590°W
- Owner: Steve Bensusan
- Capacity: 700 (approximate)
- Type: Music Venue, Nightclub
- Events: Alternative, Electronic, Folk, Hip Hop, Indie, Pop, Rock, World

Construction
- Closed: February 4, 2019

Website
- highlineballroom.com

The Highline Ballroom was a music venue and nightclub located at 431 West 16th Street in the neighborhood of Manhattan in New York City.

== Description ==
Primarily featuring musical acts, its capacity was approximately 700 people hosting diverse concert programming from "rock to hip hop" year round.

The venue was owned by Steve Bensusan.

The last show was performed by The Roots on February 4, 2019.

The site is currently the rock club Racket NYC.

== See also ==
- List of jazz clubs
