= Chasing Pavements =

2008 single by Adele

Single by Adele

from the album 19
- B-side: "That's It, I Quit, I'm Movin' On" (live)
- Released: 14 January 2008
- Recorded: 2007
- Studio: Compass Point Studios (Nassau, The Bahamas)
- Genre: Soul; pop
- Length: 3:30
- Label: XL; Columbia
- Songwriters: Adele Adkins; Eg White
- Producer: Eg White

Adele singles chronology
"Hometown Glory" (2007)	"Chasing Pavements" (2008)	"Cold Shoulder" (2008)

Audio sample
- file; help

Music video
- "Chasing Pavements" on YouTube

"Chasing Pavements" is a song recorded by English singer-songwriter Adele for her debut studio album, 19 (2008). Written by Adele with her producer Francis White, the song was released as the second single from the album on 14 January 2008. Its lyrics describe questioning whether or not to keep chasing something that is not going anywhere. Adele was inspired to write the song after a public argument and subsequent break up with an older man.

"Chasing Pavements" received critical acclaim, with reviewers praising its lyrics, production and Adele's vocal performance, with many citing it amongst the singer's best songs. The song topped the charts in Norway, and reached the top 10 in eight countries, including the UK. It peaked at number two on the UK Singles Chart and received 3× Platinum by the British Phonographic Industry (BPI). The accompanying music video was directed by Mathew Cullen of the production company Motion Theory. At the 51st Annual Grammy Awards, "Chasing Pavements", received three nominations, winning Best Female Pop Vocal Performance, and being nominated for Record of the Year, and Song of the Year.

== Background and release ==
The song was inspired by an argument at a club between Adele and her former boyfriend, reportedly an older man considering Adele was, at the time, 19 years old. In an interview with ELLE she detailed the event and that created the song: During an argument with her boyfriend at a club she slapped him and then ran away, only to look back and find that no one was chasing her. She thought to herself, "you're chasing pavements", which then inspired her to write the hit song. Adele uses the term "Chasing pavements" to mean chasing something that is not leading anywhere, and in her own words she describes the song as being about the feeling of "should I give up or should I just keep trying to run after you when there's nothing there". The song itself was written in one day with the help of Francis "Eg" White, a British musician, singer, and songwriter, and was immediately sent off to Adele's record company.

"Chasing Pavements" is a part of Adele's album 19, and was the second single release from the album. The song was written in collaboration with Francis "Eg" White. They released the song on January 14, 2008 as a second preview to the album which would be later released on January 28. Adele described the song as "the start of [her] career" because it launched her stardom.

A troll on Urban Dictionary wrote that the title was referring to gay cruising, which temporarily caused some radio stations in the United States to stop playing the song. "The guy wrote it on the Urban Dictionary website, which I've used for years, and 'chasing pavements' was never on there as a slang term before," Adele said.

== Promotion ==
Adele's song, "Chasing Pavements" was promoted as both her second single and as a precursor to her album, 19. When the album released, Adele was signed with XL Recordings, a British record label, and they promoted the album, helping it become a hit song. According to Billboard, "National stations Radio 1 and Radio 2 also played a big role in making" the song "peak at No. 2 on the U.K. singles chart". "Chasing Pavements" was one of three songs in the album to receive a music video, which received attention as people attempted to find the meaning behind it.

== Critical reception ==
"Chasing Pavements" is considered one of Adele's best songs by several music critics. Chuck Arnold of Billboard listed the song second in a ranking of her discography, comparing Adele's songwriting ability to Carole King and noting that its sophistication was way beyond her years. In a readers' poll by Rolling Stone where it placed at number four, Brittany Spanos commented that it was not as "viscerally emotional" as Adele's later work on her second studio album, 21, but a "fantastic" early glimpse of her abilities. Similarly, The Guardian's Alexis Petridis ranked "Chasing Pavements" at number five, and praised its sophistication and its chorus's emphasis on Adele's vocals. Jazz Monroe of NME listed the song as Adele's eighth best, and said that it was great despite its big chorus, and described its hook as grandiose. Parade and American Songwriter both ranked the song number nine on their lists of Adele's greatest songs.

== Accolades ==
"Chasing Pavements" received three nominations at the 51st Grammy Awards. The single received nominations in the categories of Record of the Year, Song of the Year and for Best Female Pop Vocal Performance. It won the Grammy award for the Best Female Pop Vocal Performance but lost to Coldplay's "Viva la Vida" in the Song of the Year category and to Robert Plant's and Alison Krauss' collaboration, "Please Read the Letter", in the Record of the Year category. Adele performed "Chasing Pavements" with Sugarland at the ceremony.

Year	Organization	Award	Result	Ref.
2008	MTV Video Music Awards	Best Choreography	Nominated	
2008	MTVU Woodie Awards	Best Video Woodie (Best Video of the Year)	Nominated	
2009	BMI London Awards	Award Winning song	Won	
2009	Brit Awards	British Single	Nominated	
2009	Grammy Awards	Record of the Year	Nominated	
2009	Grammy Awards	Song of the Year	Nominated	
2009	Grammy Awards	Best Female Pop Vocal Performance	Won	

== Chart performance ==
"Chasing Pavements" debuted at its peak of number two on the UK Singles Chart issued for 20 January 2008. The song remained at this position for three consecutive weeks and stayed on the chart for 25 weeks, earning a triple Platinum certification from the British Phonographic Industry (BPI). The song reached number 28 on the Canadian Hot 100. Music Canada certified it double Platinum. "Chasing Pavements" also peaked within the top 10 of national record charts, at number one in Norway, number two in Scotland, number four in Israel, Japan, number seven in Ireland, Italy, number eight in Denmark, number nine in the Netherlands, and number 10 in Belgium. The song received a Gold certification in Denmark, Italy, and Norway. On the US Billboard Hot 100, the song charted at number 21. The Recording Industry Association of America (RIAA) certified "Chasing Pavements" Platinum, which denotes one million copies sold, while Billboard reported it had sold 1.2 million units as of October 2011.

== Music video ==
=== Synopsis ===
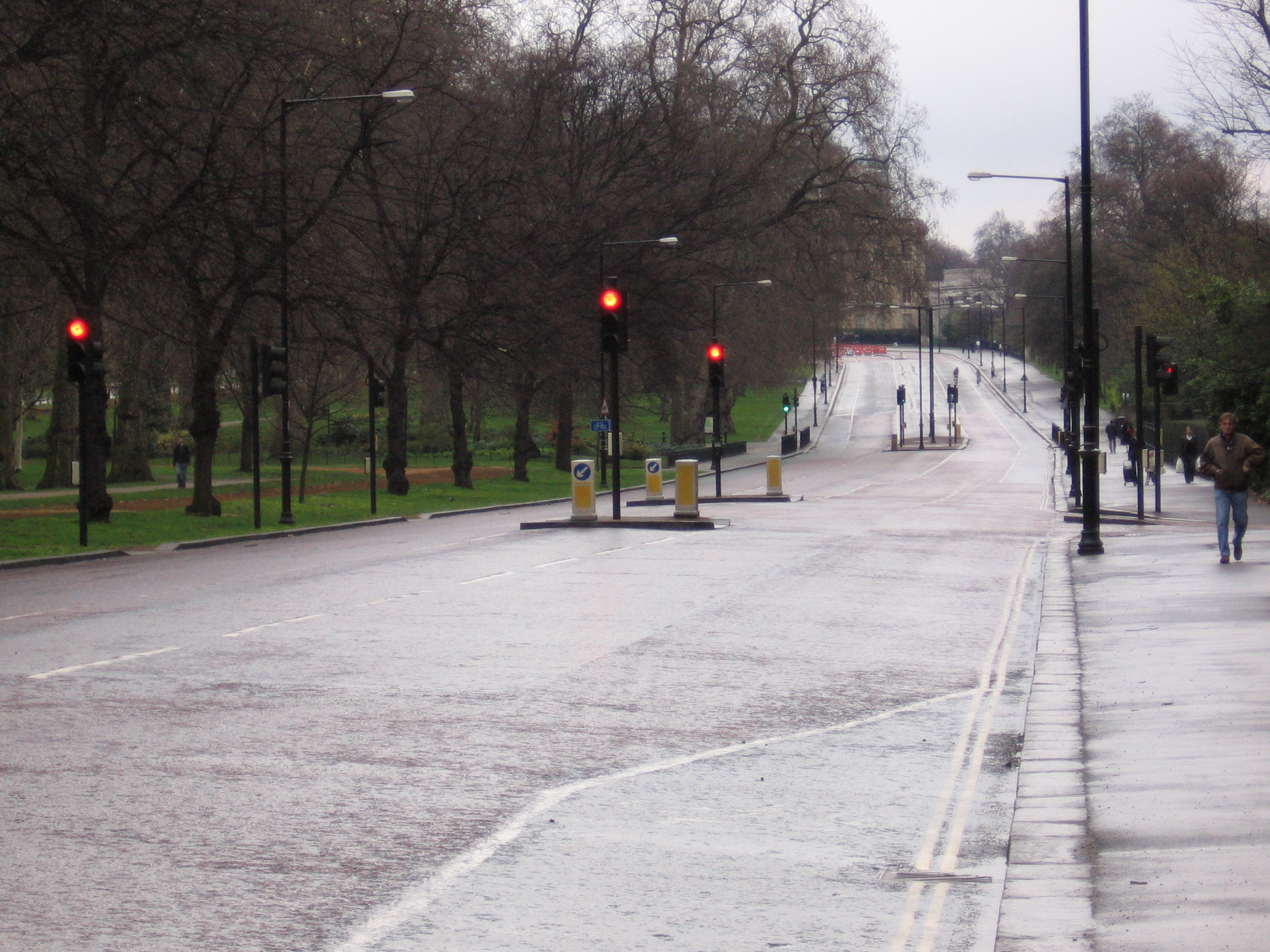
Hyde Park, London where the incident happened.

The song's music video focuses on a car crash (a white Peugeot 505 saloon) occurring in Hyde Park, London. While set in London, the video was actually shot in Los Angeles. It was directed by Mathew Cullen.

It features two views: one of the real-world in which the occupants of the car are lying motionless on the pavement following the accident, and the other (during the choruses) in which the camera shows them from above. Adele is seen in the first view, inside a car with a man. She sings before getting out of the car and walking past a group of people who are running towards the accident scene. Then, she stands beside a tree continuing to sing until it ends with the victims shown on stretchers, being wheeled away in different directions by ambulance crews tending to them. Adele is not one of the car crash victims.

In the second view, the couple is shown from a bird's-eye view, but as if they are shot side-on and they 'come to life' and move as if standing up. The couple appear to reenact their relationship, starting from their first meeting when the woman dropped her scarf and the man handed it back to her. For a while the couple appears happy together, though it is short-lived; the man discovers that the woman had another lover. She writes something on a piece of paper and when the man reads it, he is angered, but he forgives her and they begin rekindling the passion they once had before the crash. When Adele sings the chorus for the final time, the couple dance on the pavement surrounded by the onlookers, who are now also dancing. The man and the woman dance gracefully and intimately, but in spite of all the joy, they are still just two bodies lying motionless on the pavement, and are then wheeled away by ambulance crews in different directions.

=== Reception ===
The song's music video earned a 2008 MTV Video Music Award nomination for Best Choreography. On 20 December 2008, the video was ranked number 26 on VH1's Top 40 of 2008.

== Lyrical interpretation ==
Adele said that the song was about an ex-boyfriend she fell out of love with. In an interview with American Songwriter, she said: "It’s me being hopeful for a relationship that’s very much over. The sort of relationship you hate when you’re in it, but miss when you’re not". In different interview with ELLE, Adele reveals the story that inspired these lyrics: "I slapped my boyfriend and was running down to Tottenham Court Road in London to make sure I didn’t get in trouble, and then no one was chasing after me, and I was, like, “You’re chasing pavements, it’s going nowhere".

== Live performances ==
Adele premiered the song on Friday Night with Jonathan Ross on 7 December 2007. She performed "Chasing Pavements" at Hotel Cafe on 20 March 2008. This live performance was recorded as part of an acoustic version of the 19 album. She performed the song on Late Show with David Letterman on 16 June 2008. She also performed the song at the Billboard offices the same day. She performed the song live on The View on 3 September 2008. She also performed "Chasing Pavements", along with "Cold Shoulder", on Saturday Night Live on 18 October 2008. She performed "Chasing Pavements" on The Ellen DeGeneres Show on 10 December 2008. She performed the song at Jools' Annual Hootenanny on 31 December 2008. She performed the song alongside Sugarland at the 51st Annual Grammy Awards on 8 February 2009. She performed the song on Dancing with the Stars on 24 March 2009.

== Track listing ==
UK – CD and 7-inch vinyl

1. "Chasing Pavements" (Adele, Eg White) – 3:31
2. "That's It, I Quit, I'm Movin' On" (live) (Sam Cooke) – 2:12

== Credits and personnel ==
Credits are adapted from the liner notes of 19.

Recording

- Recorded at Compass Point Studios, Bahamas

Personnel

- Adele – songwriter, vocals
- Eg White – songwriter, producer, string arranger
- Tom Elmhirst – mixing engineer
- Dan Parry – assistant mixing engineer
- Steve Price – strings recording engineer
- London Studio Orchestra – strings
- Perry Montague – strings

== Charts ==
=== Weekly charts ===
Weekly chart positions for "Chasing Pavements"
Chart (2008–2021)	Peak position
Austria (Ö3 Austria Top 40)	56
Belgium (Ultratop 50 Flanders)	10
Belgium (Ultratop 50 Wallonia)	21
Canada Hot 100 (Billboard)	28
Czech Republic Airplay (ČNS IFPI)	27
Denmark (Tracklisten)	8
European Hot 100 Singles (Billboard)	8
Finland Download (Latauslista)	15
France (SNEP)	180
Germany (GfK)	46
Global 200 (Billboard)	113
Iceland (Tónlistinn)	13
Ireland (IRMA)	7
Israel (Media Forest)	4
Italy (FIMI)	7
Japan (Japan Hot 100)	4
Netherlands (Dutch Top 40)	9
Netherlands (Single Top 100)	3
Norway (VG-lista)	1
Scottish Singles Sales (Official Charts)	2
Slovakia Airplay (ČNS IFPI)	51
Sweden (Sverigetopplistan)	37
Switzerland Airplay (Schweizer Hitparade)	4
UK Singles (Official Charts)	2
UK Indie (Official Charts)	1
US Billboard Hot 100	21
US Adult Alternative Airplay (Billboard)	25
US Adult Contemporary (Billboard)	23
US Adult Pop Airplay (Billboard)	16

=== Year-end charts ===
Year-end chart positions for "Chasing Pavements"
Chart (2008)	Position
Belgium (Ultratop 50 Flanders)	27
European Hot 100 Singles (Billboard)	53
Japan (Japan Hot 100)	54
Netherlands (Dutch Top 40)	46
Netherlands (Single Top 100)	36
Taiwan (Yearly Singles Top 100)	72
UK Singles (OCC)	27

== Certifications ==
Certifications for "Chasing Pavements"
Region	Certification	Certified units/sales
Brazil (Pro-Música Brasil)	Gold	30,000^{‡}
Canada (Music Canada)	3× Platinum	240,000^{‡}
Denmark (IFPI Danmark)	Platinum	90,000^{‡}
Italy (FIMI)	Gold	10,000^{*}
Norway (IFPI Norway)	Gold	5,000^{*}
New Zealand (RMNZ)	3× Platinum	90,000^{‡}
Spain (Promusicae)	Gold	30,000^{‡}
United Kingdom (BPI)	3× Platinum	1,800,000^{‡}
United States (RIAA)	Platinum	1,000,000^{*}
^{*} Sales figures based on certification alone.^{‡} Sales+streaming figures based on certification alone.

== Release history ==
Release dates for "Chasing Pavements"
Region	Date
Europe	11 January 2008
United Kingdom	14 January 2008

== In popular culture ==
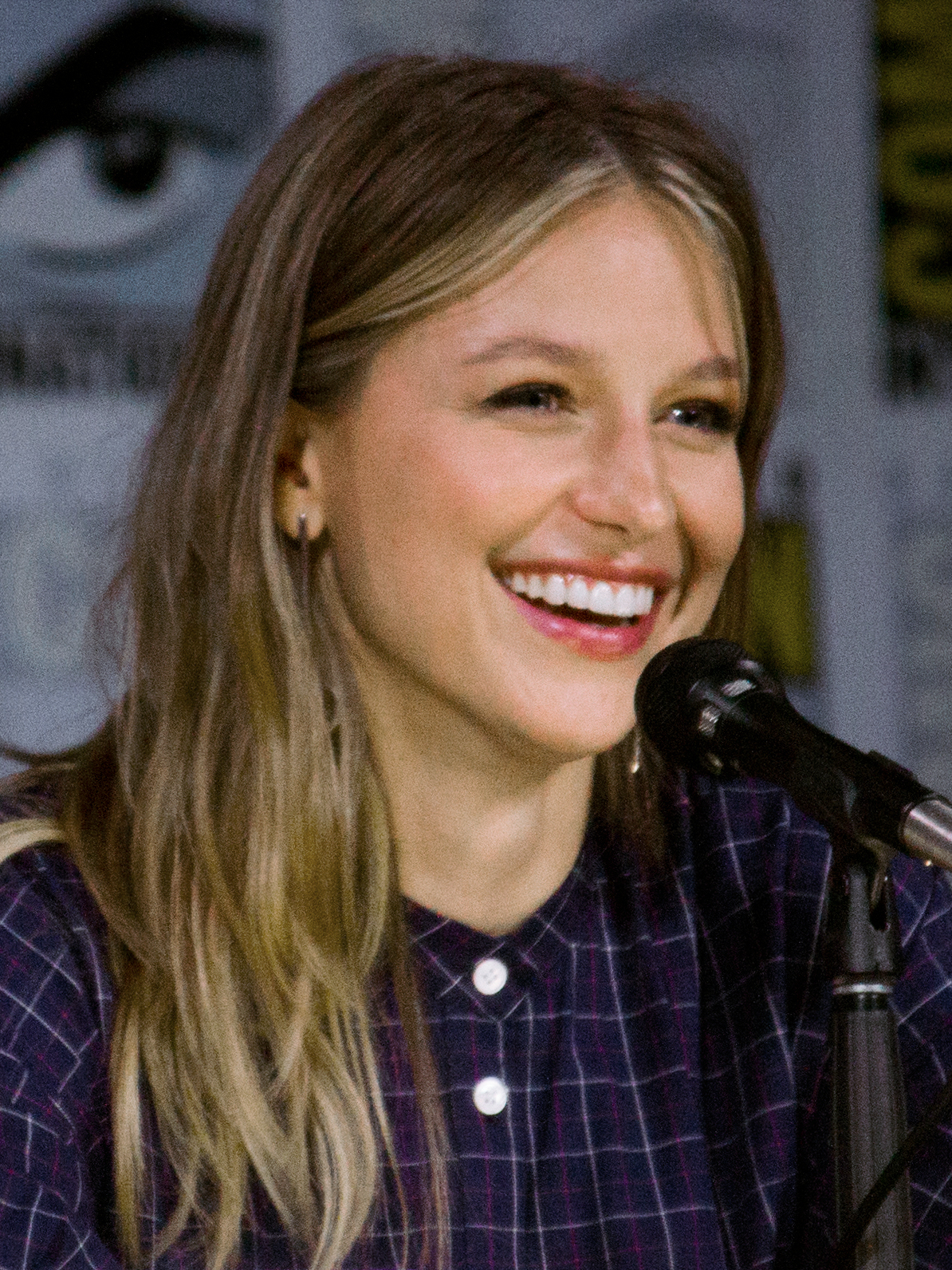
Melissa Benoist performed a cover of "Chasing Pavements" in a Glee episode.

=== Covers ===
The song was performed by Melissa Benoist on the 2012 episode "The New Rachel" of Glee. In 2013, American R&B singer, Candice Glover performed the song on the singing competition series, American Idol, during her time as a contestant on the show. American rapper Machine Gun Kelly also covered the song and it has over 9.5 million views on YouTube.

=== Soundtrack appearances ===
"Chasing Pavements" was featured in three episodes of Hollyoaks. The first was in a concluding scene of Hannah Ashworth's anorexia. The second instance was during the beginning scene of Charlie Dean's custody battle. The third was in a scene showing Dominic Reilly reflecting on Tina McQueen talking to him. The song was also featured in the film Wild Child, and the TV show 90210. The song soundtracked the closing season to sixth episode of the third season of The Comeback, heard over the final scene where Valerie Cherish watches news footage of her becoming Hollywood’s number one enemy after it leaked her latest sitcom was written with A.I..
