= Cold Shoulder (Adele song) =

Single by Adele

from the album 19
- B-side: "Now and Then"
- Released: 21 April 2008
- Recorded: 2007
- Studio: Compass Point Studios (Nassau, The Bahamas)
- Genre: Funk; trip hop
- Length: 3:12
- Label: XL
- Songwriters: Adele Adkins; Sacha Skarbek
- Producer: Mark Ronson

Adele singles chronology
"Chasing Pavements" (2008)	"Cold Shoulder" (2008)	"Make You Feel My Love" (2008)

Music video
- "Cold Shoulder" on YouTube

"Cold Shoulder" is a song by the British singer-songwriter Adele, released from her first album 19. It was released digitally in Ireland on 20 April 2008 and in the UK on 21 April 2008. "Cold Shoulder" is the only song on the album to be produced by Mark Ronson. The former Jamiroquai bass guitarist Stuart Zender plays bass guitar on the song and is also part of Ronson's touring band. Adele performed the song on Friday Night with Jools Holland on 8 February 2008 and on Saturday Night Live during the 18 October 2008 show. A remix by Basement Jaxx also received airplay and is digitally available.

== Critical reception ==
The song was met with positive reviews from critics, with most praising Adele's vocals and the song's lyrics. However, Clash Magazine described the song and Ronson's production as having "high concept" and "slick production" that "seems as soulless as a Michael Bay film".

== Music video ==
The music video for "Cold Shoulder" was shot in February 2008 in London. It had airplay on UK music channels and shows Adele singing in a darkened room among melting ice statues, each with looks of despair. The music video ends with many of the statues melted and the final shots of Adele interfade into those of the statues. As of December 2023, the music video has received over 35 million views on YouTube.

== Track listings ==
UK – CD and 7-inch vinyl

1. "Cold Shoulder" 3:15
2. "Now and Then" 3:24

iTunes EP
Cold Shoulder – EP

1. "Cold Shoulder"
2. "Cold Shoulder" (Basement Jaxx Classic Edit)
3. "Cold Shoulder" (Basement Jaxx Classic Remix)
4. "Cold Shoulder" (Basement Jaxx DuBB)
5. "Cold Shoulder" (Rusko Remix)
6. "Cold Shoulder" (Out of Office Remix)

== Credits and personnel ==
- Vocals – Adele
- Songwriting – Adele Adkins, Sacha Skarbek
- Production, drums, guitar, programming, keyboards – Mark Ronson
- Keyboards – Jason Silver
- Guitar – Michael Tighe, Matt Allchin
- Bass guitar – Stuart Zender
- Percussion – Pete Biggins
- Glockenspiel – Sam Koppelman
- String arrangements – Chris Elliott

== Release history ==
Release dates for "Cold Shoulder"
Country	Date
United Kingdom	21 April 2008
Europe	16 June 2008

== Charts ==
=== Weekly charts ===
Weekly chart performance
Chart (2008)	Peak position
Belgium (Ultratip Bubbling Under Flanders)	3
Belgium (Ultratip Bubbling Under Wallonia)	19
European Hot 100 Singles (Billboard)	61
Netherlands (Dutch Top 40)	28
Netherlands (Single Top 100)	68
Scottish Singles Sales (Official Charts)	29
Switzerland Airplay (Schweizer Hitparade)	26
UK Singles (OCC)	18

=== Year-end charts ===
Annual chart rankings
Chart (2008)	Position
UK Singles (OCC)	192

== Certifications ==
Certifications and sales
Region	Certification	Certified units/sales
United Kingdom (BPI)	Silver	200,000^{‡}
^{‡} Sales+streaming figures based on certification alone.
