= Adele =

English singer-songwriter (born 1988)

Adele MBE
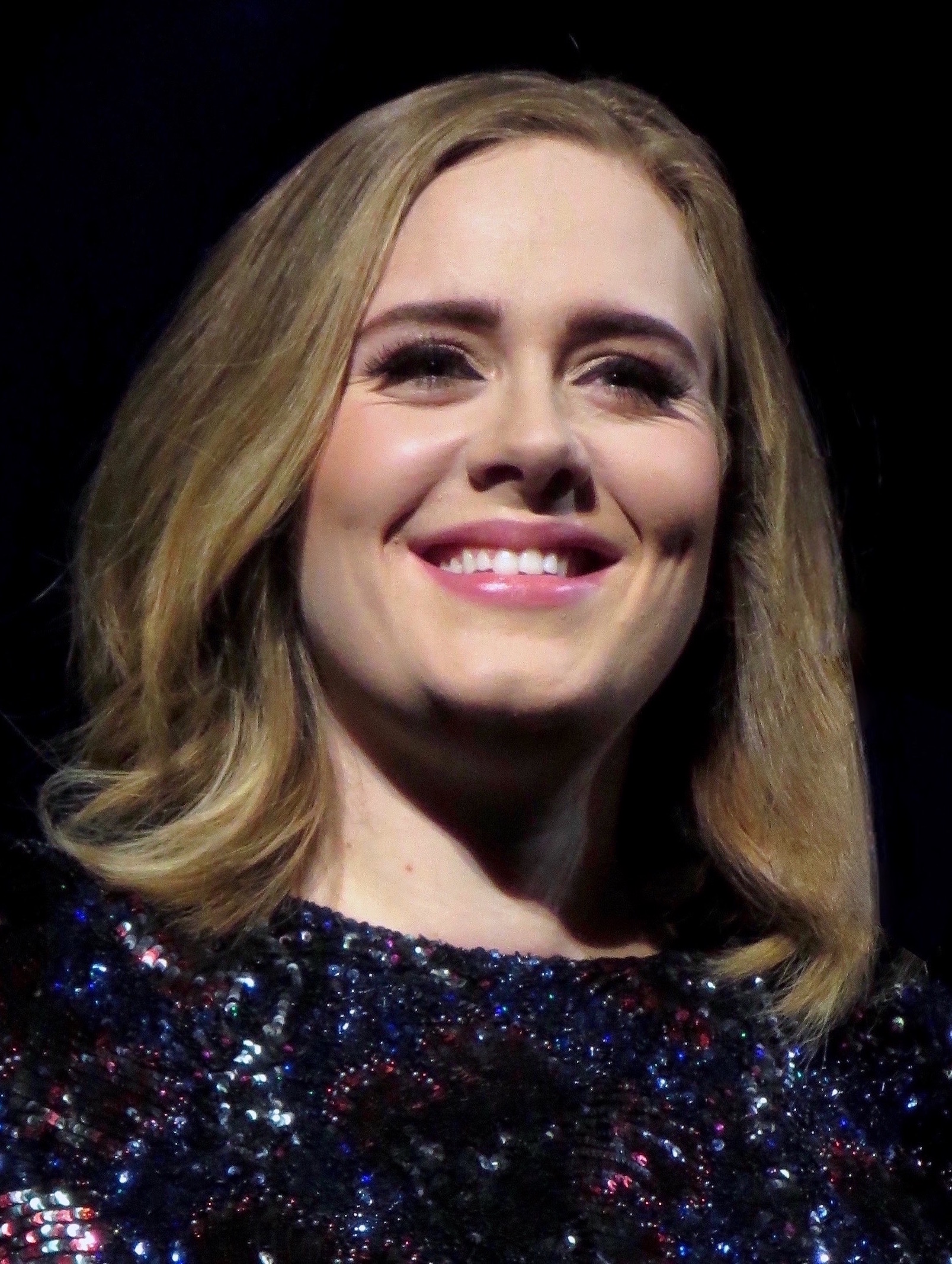
- Adele in 2016
- Born: Adele Laurie Blue Adkins; 5 May 1988 (age 38); London, England
- Education: BRIT School for Performing Arts and Technology
- Occupations: Singer; songwriter
- Years active: 2006–present (Note: Indefinite hiatus since 2024)
- Works: Discography; songs recorded
- Spouses: Simon Konecki (m. 2018; div. 2021)
- Partner(s): Rich Paul (2021–present; engaged)
- Children: 1
- Awards: Full list
- Musical career
- Genres: Pop; soul
- Instruments: Vocals; guitar
- Labels: XL; Columbia; Melted Stone
- Website: adele.com

Adele Laurie Blue Adkins (/əˈdɛl/ ə-DEL; born 5 May 1988) is an English singer and songwriter. Regarded as a British cultural icon, she is known for her mezzo-soprano vocals and sentimental songwriting. Her accolades include 16 Grammy Awards, 12 Brit Awards (including three for British Album of the Year), an Academy Award, a Primetime Emmy Award, and a Golden Globe Award.

After graduating from the BRIT School in 2006, Adele signed a record deal with XL Recordings. Her debut album, 19 (2008), included the UK top-five singles "Chasing Pavements" and "Make You Feel My Love", becoming one of best-selling debut albums ever in the UK. She received the Grammy Award for Best New Artist. Her second studio album, 21 (2011), became the best-selling album of the 21st century. 21 holds the record for the top-performing album in US chart history, topping the Billboard 200 for 24 weeks, with the singles "Rolling in the Deep", "Someone like You", and "Set Fire to the Rain" heading charts worldwide and becoming her signature songs. The album received a record-tying six Grammy Awards, including Album of the Year.

In 2013, Adele won the Academy Award for Best Original Song for the James Bond film soundtrack single "Skyfall". Her third studio album, 25 (2015), broke first-week sales records in both the UK and US. In the US, it became the first album to sell over three million copies in a week. 25 earned her five Grammy Awards, including the Album of the Year. Its lead single, "Hello", achieved worldwide success. Her fourth studio album, 30 (2021), was led by the single "Easy on Me", which won her a Grammy Award. 25 and 30 became the best-selling albums worldwide in 2015 and 2021, respectively.

Adele is one of the world's best-selling music artists, with sales of over 120 million records worldwide. The best-selling female artist of the 21st century in the UK, she was named the best-selling artist of the 2010s in the US. Her studio albums 21 and 25 were the top two best-selling albums of the 2010s in the UK and both are listed among the best-selling albums in UK chart history, while in the US both are certified Diamond, the most of any artist who debuted in the 21st century. As of 2024, all of her studio albums, except 19, have topped the yearly best-selling albums chart worldwide in the 21st century.

== Early life and education ==
Adele Laurie Blue Adkins was born on 5 May 1988 in Tottenham, London, to an English mother, Penny Adkins, and a Welsh father, Marc Evans. After Evans left when Adele was 2 years old, she was brought up by her mother. She began singing at age 4 and asserts that she became obsessed with voices. In 1997, 9-year-old Adele and her mother, who by then had found work as a furniture maker and an adult-learning activities organiser, relocated to Brighton on the south coast of England.

In 1999, Adele along with her mother moved back to London; first to Brixton, then to the neighbouring district of West Norwood in south London, which is the subject of her first song "Hometown Glory". Adele spent much of her youth in Brockwell Park where she would play the guitar and sing to friends, which she recalled in her 2015 song "Million Years Ago". She stated, "It has quite monumental moments of my life that I've spent there, and I drove past it [in 2015] and I just literally burst into tears. I really missed it." Adele graduated from the BRIT School for Performing Arts & Technology in Croydon in May 2006, where she was a classmate of Leona Lewis and Jessie J. Adele credits the school with nurturing her talent even though, at the time, she was more interested in going into artists and repertoire (A&R) and hoped to launch other people's careers.

== Career ==
=== 2006–2010: Career beginnings and 19 ===
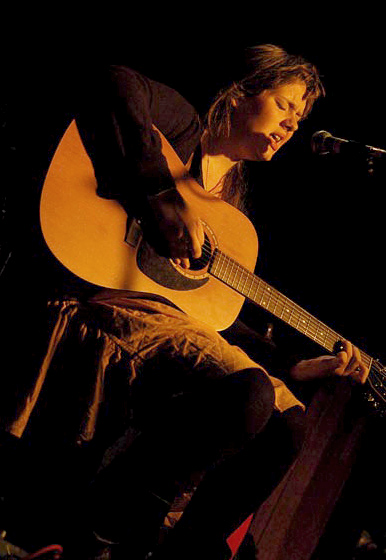
Adele performing in 2007

In 2006, the then 17-year-old was billed as a featured vocalist on a single called "Be Divine" by a techno DJ named Ricsta. The song was issued under the now-defunct Stirfried Trax label and was the first under Adele's name. Described by Hugh McIntyre from Bustle as an "electronic club-ready" track, the song never charted and received little attention.

Four months after graduating from the BRIT school, Adele continued writing music. She published two songs in the fourth issue of the online arts publication PlatformsMagazine.com. She recorded a three-song demo for a class project and gave it to a friend. The friend then posted the demo on Myspace, and the song became a hit. Richard Russell, director of the music label XL Recordings, took notice of the song and called Adele. She doubted if the offer was real and took a friend with her to the meeting. Nick Huggett, an executive at XL, took notice of Adele's talent and referred her to Jonathan Dickins of September Management. At the time, September was managing Jamie T, and Adele, a fan of the British singer-songwriter, decided to sign with Dickins. In June 2006, Dickins became Adele's official manager. In September 2006, Adele signed with XL Recordings.

Adele provided vocals for Jack Peñate's song, "My Yvonne", for his debut album. It was during this session she first met producer Jim Abbiss, who would go on to produce both the majority of her debut album, 19, and tracks on 21. In June 2007, Adele made her television debut, performing "Daydreamer" on the BBC's Later... with Jools Holland. Adele's solo debut, "Hometown Glory", written when she was 16, was released in October 2007 on Jamie T's label Pacemaker Recordings. Only five hundred records were pressed. Following its showcase on an episode of the British television show Skins, the song entered the UK Singles Chart at No. 32. It peaked at No. 19 on 27 July 2008, following its physical release. Later, the song would be rereleased on Adele's first album and, in 2010, was nominated for a Grammy.

By the end of 2008, Adele's fame had grown rapidly. She became the first recipient of the Brit Awards Critics' Choice and was named the number-one predicted breakthrough act of 2008 in an annual poll of music critics, BBC's Sound of 2008. She released her second single, "Chasing Pavements", on 14 January 2008, two weeks ahead of her debut album. The song reached number two on the UK Chart, and stayed there for four weeks. The album 19, named for her age at the time she wrote and composed many of its songs, entered the British charts at number one. The Times Encyclopedia of Modern Music named 19 an "essential" blue-eyed soul recording. Adele was nominated for a 2008 Mercury Prize award for 19. She also won an Urban Music Award for "Best Jazz Act", and a Music of Black Origin (MOBO) nomination in the category of Best UK Female. In March 2008, Adele signed a deal with Columbia Records and XL Recordings for her foray into the United States. She embarked on a short North American tour in the same month, and 19 was released in the US in June. Billboard magazine stated: "Adele truly has potential to become among the most respected and inspiring international artists of her generation." The An Evening with Adele world tour began in May 2008 and ended in June 2009.

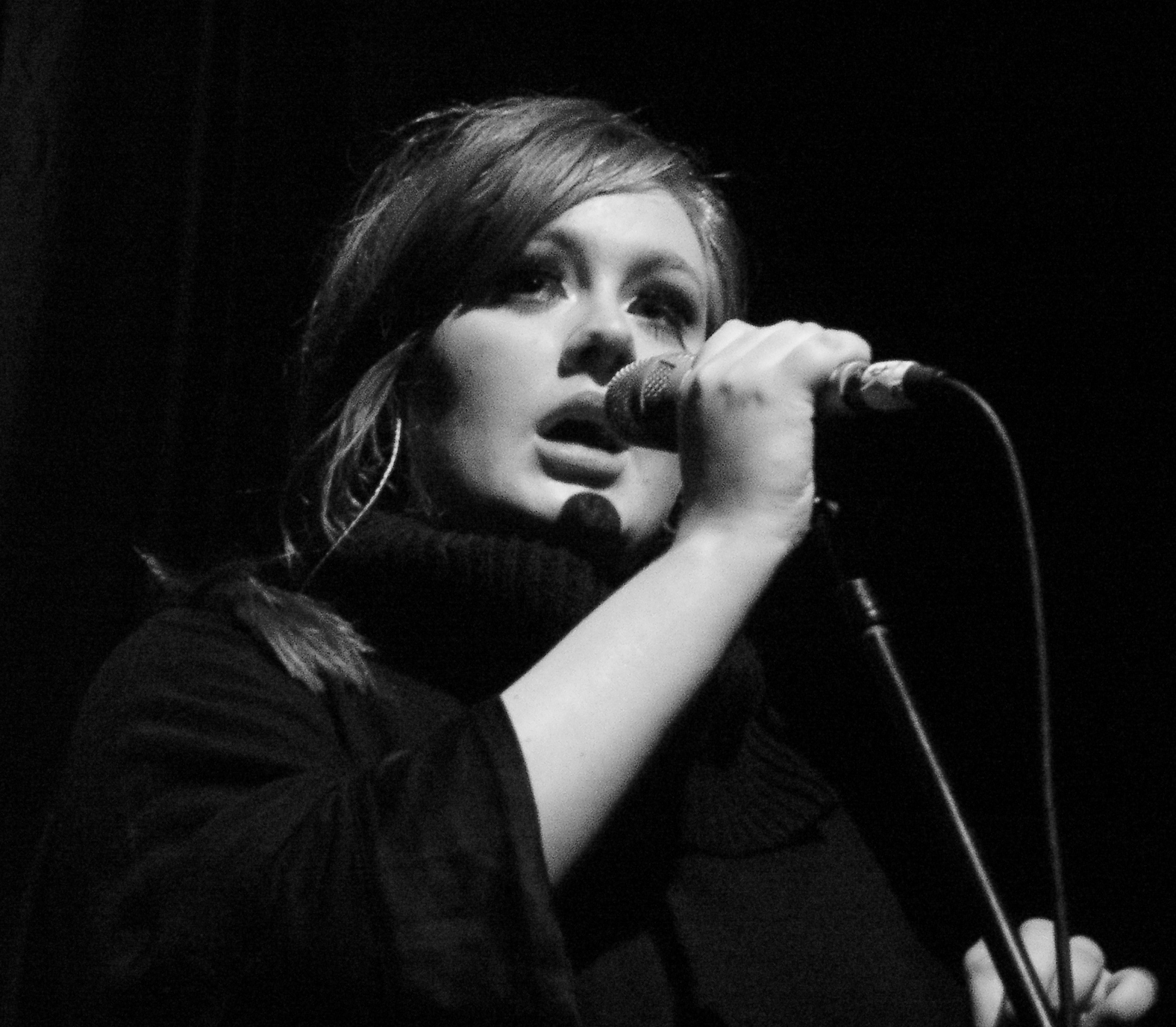
Adele performing live in January 2009

Despite Adele's strong success in the UK, she struggled to break into North America. Adele cancelled the US tour dates of her 2008 tour to be with a former boyfriend. She said in Nylon magazine in June 2009, "I'm like, 'I can't believe I did that.' It seems so ungrateful...I was drinking far too much and that was kind of the basis of my relationship with this boy. I couldn't bear to be without him, so I was like, 'Well, I'll just cancel my stuff then.'" She referred to this period as her "early life crisis". Already possessing a dislike for flying, Adele experienced severe bouts of homesickness while away from London.

On 18 October 2008, Adele was featured as the musical guest in an episode of NBC's Saturday Night Live (SNL). The episode, which included a planned appearance by then-US vice-presidential candidate Sarah Palin, earned the program 17 million viewers. Adele performed "Chasing Pavements" and "Cold Shoulder",. The episode gave SNL its highest ratings in fourteen years, and Adele became an overnight sensation. Former SNL cast member Bill Hader later stated, "I remember us sitting at the rewrite table on [floor] 9, and Adele — not a lot of us had heard of her — she started singing. And it was like we all stopped. We opened the curtain and everybody looked down and went, 'Who is that?'"

The morning after the episode aired, 19 topped the iTunes charts and ranked number five on Amazon's charts while "Chasing Pavements" rose into the top 25. The album reached number 11 on the Billboard 200 as a result, a jump of 35 places over the previous week. In November 2008, Adele moved to Notting Hill, leaving her mother's house and quitting drinking. The album was certified gold in early 2009, by the RIAA. By July 2009, the album had sold 2.2 million copies worldwide.

At the 51st Annual Grammy Awards in February 2009, Adele won the award for Best New Artist, in addition to the award for Best Female Pop Vocal Performance for "Chasing Pavements", which was also nominated for Record of the Year and Song of the Year. Adele performed "Chasing Pavements" at the ceremony in a duet with Jennifer Nettles. In 2010, Adele received a Grammy nomination for Best Female Pop Vocal Performance for "Hometown Glory". In April her song "My Same" entered the German Singles Chart after it had been performed by Lena Meyer-Landrut in the talent show contest Unser Star für Oslo, or Our Star for Oslo, in which the German entry to the Eurovision Song Contest 2010 was determined. In late September, after being featured on The X Factor, Adele's version of Bob Dylan's "Make You Feel My Love" re-entered the UK singles chart at number 4. During the 2010 CMT Artists of the Year special, Adele performed a widely publicised duet of Lady Antebellum's "Need You Now" with Darius Rucker. This performance was later nominated for a CMT Music Award.

=== 2011–2014: Worldwide recognition with 21 ===
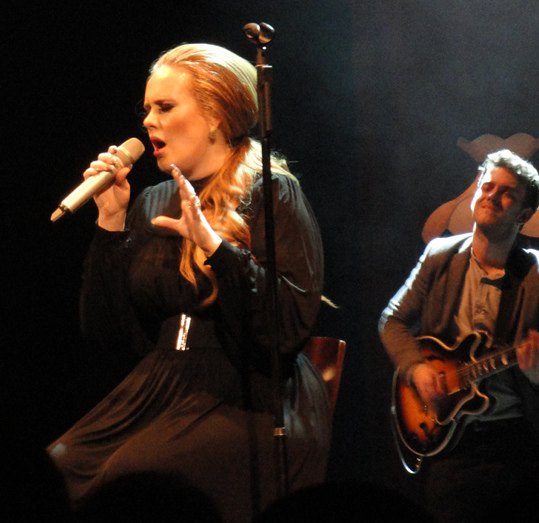
Adele performing in Seattle, Washington, on 12 August 2011

Adele released her second studio album, 21, on 24 January 2011 in the UK and 22 February in the US. She said the album was inspired by the break-up with her former partner. The album's sound is described as classic and contemporary country and roots music. The change in sound from her debut album was the result of her bus driver playing contemporary music from Nashville when she was touring the American South, and the title reflected the growth she had experienced in the prior two years. Adele told Spin Magazine: "It was really exciting for me because I never grew up around [that music]." 21 topped the charts in 30 countries, including the UK and the US.

In a 2011 Rolling Stone cover story, Adele said she dealt with onstage anxiety by creating the alter ego "Sasha Carter", derived from Beyoncé's "Sasha Fierce" persona and the American country singer June Carter. Before meeting Beyoncé, Adele described experiencing an intense anxiety attack. In response, she asked herself, "What would Sasha Fierce do?" and that helped immensely.

Adele's performance of "Someone like You" at the 31st Brit Awards on 15 February propelled the song to number one chartbuster in the UK. Her first album, 19, re-entered the UK album chart alongside 21, while first and second singles "Rolling in the Deep" and "Someone Like You" were in the top 5 of the UK singles chart, making Adele the first living artist to achieve the feat of two top-five hits in both the Official Singles Chart and the Official Albums Chart simultaneously since the Beatles in 1964. Both songs topped the charts in multiple markets and broke numerous sales performance records. Following her performance of "Someone Like You" at the 2011 MTV Video Music Awards, it became Adele's second number-one single on the Billboard Hot 100. By December 2011, 21 sold over 3.4 million copies in the UK, and became the biggest-selling album of the 21st century, overtaking Amy Winehouse's Back to Black, with Adele becoming the first artist ever to sell three million albums in the UK in one calendar year. "Set Fire to the Rain" became Adele's third number-one single on the Billboard Hot 100, as Adele became the first artist ever to have an album, 21, hold the number-one position on the Billboard 200 concurrently with three number-one singles. Moreover, 21 had the most weeks on the Billboard 200 chart of any album by a female artist.

To promote the album, Adele embarked upon the "Adele Live" tour, which sold out its North American leg. In October 2011, Adele was forced to cancel two tours because of a vocal cord hemorrhage. She released a statement saying she needed an extended period of rest to avoid permanent damage to her voice. In the first week of November 2011, Steven Zeitels, director of the Center for Laryngeal Surgery and Voice Rehabilitation at the Massachusetts General Hospital in Boston, performed laser microsurgery on Adele's vocal cords to remove a benign polyp. A recording of her tour, Live at the Royal Albert Hall, was released in November 2011, debuting at number one in the US with 96,000 copies sold, the highest one-week tally for a music DVD in four years. It became the best-selling music DVD of 2011. Adele is the first artist in Nielsen SoundScan history to have the year's number-one album (21), number-one single ("Rolling in the Deep"), and number-one music video (Live at the Royal Albert Hall). At the 2011 American Music Awards on 20 November, Adele won three awards; Favorite Pop/Rock Female Artist, Favorite Adult Contemporary Artist, and Favorite Pop/Rock Album for 21. On 9 December, Billboard named Adele Artist of the Year, Billboard 200 Album of the Year (21), and the Billboard Hot 100 Song of the Year ("Rolling in the Deep"), becoming the first woman ever to top all three categories.

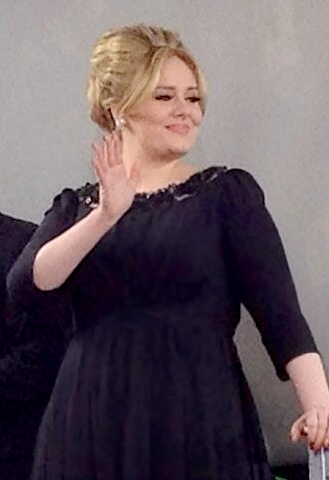
Adele at the 2013 Golden Globe Awards

Following her throat surgery, Adele made her live comeback at the 2012 Grammy Awards in February. She won in all six categories for which she was nominated, including Album of the Year, Record of the Year, and Song of the Year, making her the second female artist in Grammy history, after Beyoncé, to win that many awards in a single night. Following that success, 21 achieved the biggest weekly sales increase following a Grammy win since Nielsen SoundScan began tracking data in 1991. Adele received the Brit Award for British Female Solo Artist, and British Album of the Year presented to her by George Michael. Following the Brit Awards, 21 reached number one for the 21st non-consecutive week in the UK. The album has sold over 4.5 million copies in the UK where it is the fourth-best-selling album. In October, the album's sales surpassed 4.5 million in the UK, and in November it surpassed 10 million sales in the US. 21 was the best-selling album worldwide of 2011 and 2012, and remains the best-selling album of the 21st century; as of 2016, the album has sold over 31 million copies. By the end of 2014, she had sold an estimated 40 million albums and 50 million singles worldwide. Adele is the only artist or band in the last decade in the US to earn an RIAA diamond certification for a one disc album in less than two years.

In October 2012, Adele confirmed that she had been writing, composing, and recording the theme song for Skyfall, the twenty-third James Bond film. The song "Skyfall", written and composed in collaboration with producer Paul Epworth, was recorded at Abbey Road Studios, and features orchestrations by J. A. C. Redford. Adele stated recording "Skyfall" was "one of the proudest moments of my life." On 14 October, "Skyfall" rose to number 2 on the UK Singles Chart with sales of 92,000 copies bringing its overall sales to 176,000, and "Skyfall" entered the Billboard Hot 100 at number 8, selling 261,000 copies in the US in its first three days. This tied "Skyfall" with Duran Duran's "A View to a Kill" as the highest-charting James Bond theme song on the UK Singles Chart; a record surpassed in 2015 by Sam Smith's "Writing's on the Wall".

"Skyfall" sold more than five million copies worldwide and earned Adele the Golden Globe Award for Best Original Song and the Academy Award for Best Original Song. In December 2012, Adele was named Billboard Artist of the Year, and 21 was named Album of the Year, making her the first artist to receive both accolades two years in a row. The Associated Press named Adele the Entertainer of the Year for 2012. The 2013 Grammy Awards saw Adele's live version of "Set Fire to the Rain" win the Grammy Award for Best Pop Solo Performance, bringing her total wins to nine.

On 3 April 2012, Adele confirmed that her third album would likely be at least two years away, stating, "I have to take time and live a little bit. There were a good two years between my first and second albums, so it'll be the same this time." She stated that she would continue writing and composing her own material. At the 2013 Grammy Awards, she confirmed that she was in the very early stages of her third album. She also stated that she will most likely work with Paul Epworth again.

In September 2013, Wiz Khalifa confirmed that he and Adele had collaborated on a song for his fifth studio album, Blacc Hollywood, though the collaboration did not make the final track listing. In January 2014, Adele received her tenth Grammy Award with "Skyfall" winning Best Song Written for Visual Media at the 56th Annual Grammy Awards.

=== 2015–2017: 25 ===
On the eve of her 26th birthday in May 2014, Adele posted a cryptic message via her Twitter account. The message, "Bye bye 25... See you again later in the year," was interpreted by some in the media, including Capital FM, as hinting that her next album would be titled 25 and would be released later in the year. In early August, Paul Moss suggested that an album would be released in 2014 or 2015. However, in the October 2014 accounts filed with Companies House by XL Recordings, they ruled out a 2014 release.

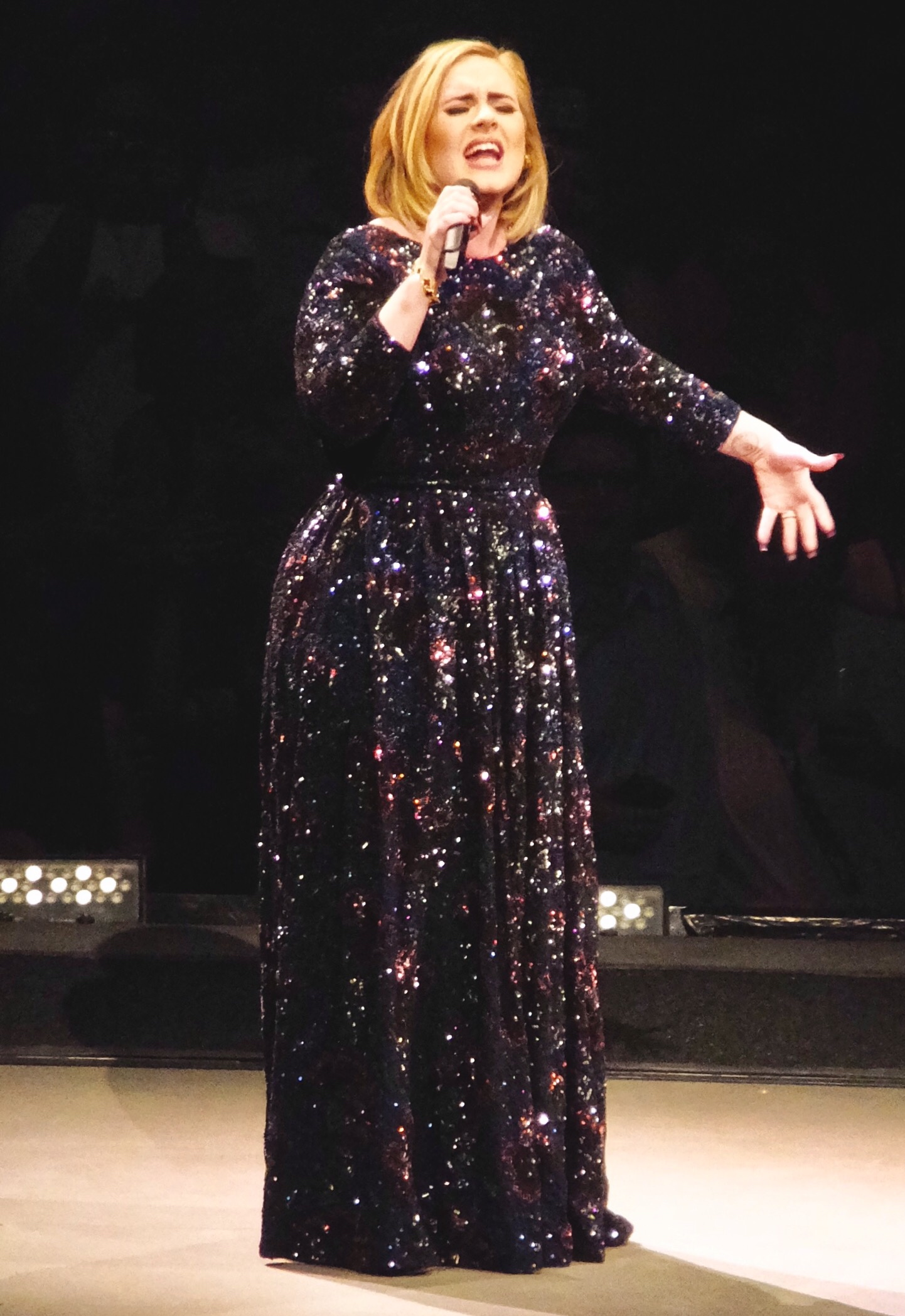
Adele singing in St. Paul, Minnesota during her first North American tour in five years in July 2016. Ten million people attempted to purchase tickets for the North American leg of Adele's world tour. Only 750,000 tickets were available.

On 27 August 2015, Billboard reported that Adele's label, XL Recordings, had intentions of releasing her third studio album in November 2015. Danger Mouse was revealed to have contributed a song, while Tobias Jesso Jr. had written a track, and Ryan Tedder was "back in the mix after producing and co-writing 'Rumour Has It' on 21." On 18 October, a 30-second clip of new material from Adele was shown during a commercial break on The X Factor. The commercial teased a snippet from a song from her third album, with viewers hearing a voice singing accompanied by lyrics on a black screen.

In a statement released three days later, Adele confirmed the album's title to be 25, with her stating, "My last record was a break-up record, and if I had to label this one, I would call it a make-up record. Making up for lost time. Making up for everything I ever did and never did. 25 is about getting to know who I've become without realising. And I'm sorry it took so long but, you know, life happened." At the time, Adele said 25 would be her last album titled after her age, believing it would be the end to a trilogy. On 22 October, Adele confirmed that 25 would be released on 20 November, while the lead single from the album, "Hello" would be released on 23 October. The song was first played on Nick Grimshaw's Radio 1 Breakfast Show on the BBC on the morning of 23 October with Adele interviewed live.

The video of "Hello", released on 22 October, was viewed over 27.7 million times on YouTube in its first 24 hours, breaking the Vevo record for the most views in a day, surpassing the 20.1 million views for "Bad Blood" by Taylor Swift. On 28 October, BBC News reported that "Hello" was being viewed on YouTube an average one million times an hour. "Hello" went on to become the fastest video to hit one billion views on YouTube, which it achieved after 88 days. The video for "Hello" captured iconic British elements such as a red telephone box and a cup of tea. The song debuted at number one on the UK Singles Chart on 30 October, with first week sales of 330,000 copies, making it the biggest-selling number-one single in three years. "Hello" also debuted at number one in many countries around the world, including Australia, France, Canada, New Zealand, Ireland and Germany, and on 2 November, the song debuted at number one on the Billboard Hot 100, becoming the first song in the US to sell at least one million downloads in a week, setting the record at 1.11 million. By the end of 2015, it had sold 12.3 million units globally and was the year's 7th-best-selling single despite being released in late October.

On 27 October, BBC One announced plans for Adele at the BBC, a one-hour special presented by Graham Norton, in which Adele talks about her new album and performs new songs. This was her first television appearance since performing at the 2013 Academy Awards ceremony, and the show was recorded before a live audience on 2 November for broadcast on 20 November, coinciding with the release of 25. On 27 October it was also announced that Adele would appear on the US entertainment series Saturday Night Live on 21 November. On 30 October, Adele confirmed that she would be performing a one-night-only concert titled Adele Live in New York City at the Radio City Music Hall on 17 November. Subsequently, NBC aired the concert special on 14 December.

On 27 November, 25 debuted at number one on the UK Albums Chart and became the fastest-selling album in UK chart history with over 800,000 copies sold in its first week. The album debuted at number one in the US where it sold a record-breaking 3.38 million copies in its first week, the largest single sales week for an album since Nielsen began monitoring sales in 1991. 25 also broke first week sales records in Canada and New Zealand. 25 became the best-selling album of 2015 in a number of countries, including Australia, the UK and the US, spending seven consecutive weeks at number one in each country, before being displaced by David Bowie's Blackstar. It was the best-selling album worldwide of 2015 with 17.4 million copies sold. 25 has since sold 20 million copies globally. Adele's seven weeks at the top of the UK Albums Chart took her total to 31 weeks at number one in the UK with her three albums, surpassing Madonna's previous record of most weeks at number one for a female act. As the best-selling artist worldwide for 2015 the IFPI named Adele the Global Recording Artist of the Year.

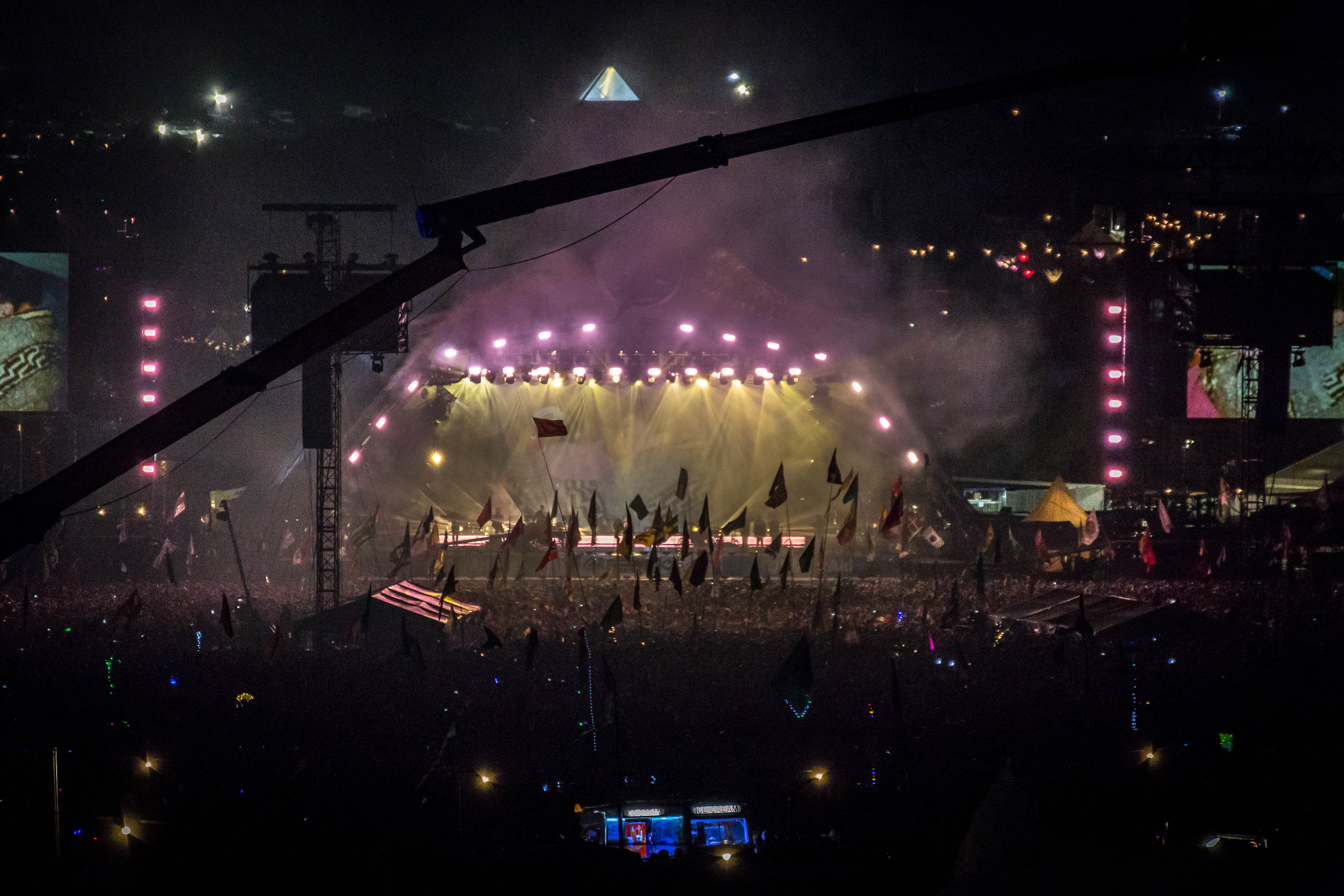
Adele on the Pyramid Stage at Glastonbury in 2016. Having been going to the festival since she was a child, an emotional Adele cried before she went on stage to 150,000 people.

In November 2015, Adele's 2016 tour was announced, her first tour since 2011. Beginning in Europe, Adele Live 2016 included four dates at the Manchester Arena in March 2016, six dates at the O2 Arena, London, with further dates in Ireland, Spain, Germany, Italy and the Netherlands among others. Her North American Tour began on 5 July in St. Paul, Minnesota. The leg included six nights at Madison Square Garden in New York City, eight nights at Staples Center in Los Angeles, and four nights at Air Canada Centre in Toronto. Adele broke Taylor Swift's five-show record for most consecutive sold-out shows at the Staples Center.

At the 36th Brit Awards in London on 24 February, Adele received the awards for British Female Solo Artist, British Album of the Year for 25, British Single of the Year for "Hello", and British Global Success, bringing her Brit Award wins to eight. She closed the ceremony by performing "When We Were Young", the second single from 25. Two more singles from 25 were released in 2016: "Send My Love (To Your New Lover)" and "Water Under the Bridge". While on stage at London's O_{2} Arena on 17 March, Adele announced that she would be headlining on the Pyramid Stage at the 2016 Glastonbury Festival, which was later confirmed by the festival's organisers. She appeared for a 90-minute 15-song set at the festival on 25 June in front of 150,000 people, and described the experience as "by far, the best moment of my life so far". In an interview with Jo Whiley on BBC Radio 2 around 30 minutes before going on stage, Adele had said she had been going to Glastonbury since she was a child and that the festival had meant a lot to her, before she broke down. Whiley recalls, "She was really scared, really, really scared. We were doing the interview and at one point she had to stop as she was in tears. It was amazing to see somebody like that, then to witness her walking out on stage and doing the most incredible set. To know that half an hour before she'd been in tears at the thought of walking out there."

In 2016, Vanity Fair magazine published a cover story which referred to Adele as the "Queen of Hearts".

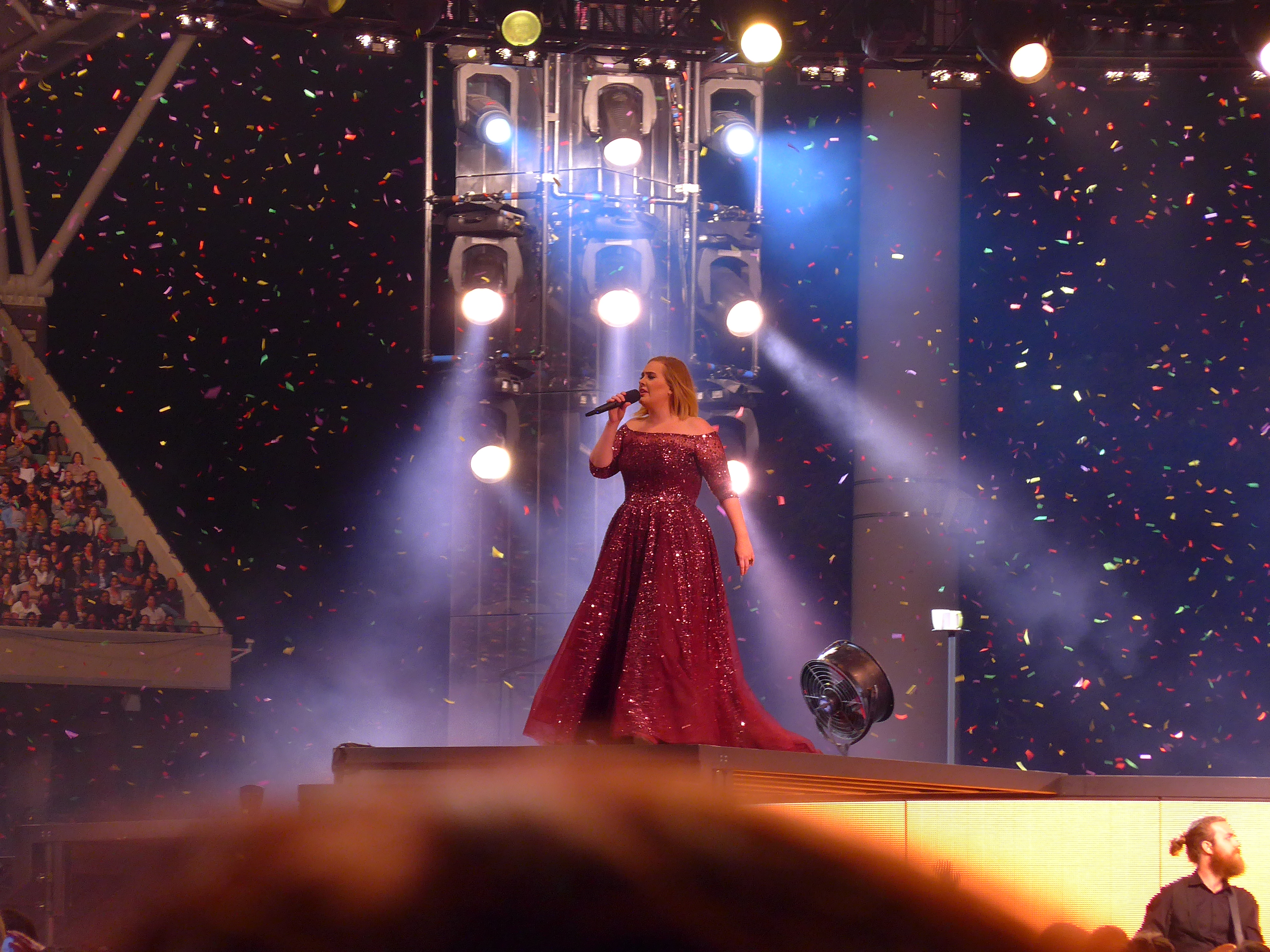
Adele performing at the Adelaide Oval in Adelaide, Australia, March 2017

As part of her world tour, in February and March 2017, Adele performed in Australia for the first time, playing outdoor stadiums around the country. Her first two shows in New Zealand sold out in a record-breaking 23 minutes, and a third show was announced, with all tickets sold in under 30 minutes. Adele sold over 600,000 tickets for her record-breaking eight date Australian tour, setting stadium records throughout the country; her Sydney show at ANZ Stadium on 10 March was seen by 95,000 people, the biggest single concert in Australian history, a record she broke the following night with more than 100,000 fans. Adele completed her world tour with two concerts, dubbed "The Finale", at Wembley Stadium, London on 28 and 29 June. She announced the shows at "the home of football" by singing the England football team's "Three Lions" anthem and also the theme song to the BBC's weekly Premier League football show Match of the Day. Adele had added another two concerts at Wembley after the first two dates sold out, however she cancelled the last two dates of the tour after damaging her vocal cords. As a show of support, fans instead gathered outside Wembley Stadium to perform renditions of her songs, in an event titled "Sing for Adele".

At the end of 2016, Billboard named Adele Artist of the Year for the third time, and also received the Top Billboard 200 album. 25 was the best-selling album for a second consecutive year in the US. With 235 million views, Adele's Carpool Karaoke through the streets of London with James Corden, a sketch which featured on Corden's talk show The Late Late Show with James Corden in January 2016, was the biggest YouTube viral video of 2016. At the 59th Annual Grammy Awards in February 2017, Adele won all five of her nominations, bringing her number of awards to fifteen. She won Album of the Year and Best Pop Vocal Album for 25, and Record of the Year, Song of the Year and Best Pop Solo Performance for "Hello". She also performed a tribute to the late George Michael by singing a rendition of his song "Fastlove"; due to technical difficulties which occurred during the performance, Adele decided to stop and restart, explaining "I can't mess this up for him". As announced on 31 July 2017, Adele switched performance rights management in the US from BMI to SESAC.

=== 2018–present: 30 and Las Vegas residency ===
Adele was reportedly working on her fourth studio album by 2018. On 5 May 2019, her 31st birthday, Adele posted several black-and-white pictures of herself on her Instagram account celebrating the occasion along with a message reflecting on the preceding year. The message ended with, "30 will be a drum n bass record to spite you". Media outlets took the post as an indication that a new album was on the way. On 15 February 2020, Adele announced at a friend's wedding that her fourth studio album would be out by September 2020. However, she later confirmed that the album's production and release had been delayed due to the COVID-19 pandemic. Adele made her first television appearance in almost four years by hosting the 24 October 2020 episode of Saturday Night Live, with musical guest H.E.R.

On 1 October 2021, projections and billboards of the number "30" appeared on significant landmarks and buildings in different cities around the world, fuelling speculation that the number was connected to Adele, and that 30 would be the title of her fourth album. Soon after, Adele's website and social media accounts matched the aesthetic of the projections and billboards, hinting that her new album would be titled 30, which was subsequently confirmed. On 5 October 2021, Adele announced her single "Easy on Me" for release on 15 October. A release date of 19 November 2021 was announced for the album shortly thereafter. On 7 October, Adele was announced to be the November cover star on both Vogue and British Vogue, the first person to simultaneously cover both publications at the same time. On 15 October, Adele released "Easy on Me" to a positive reception, breaking Spotify and Amazon Music records for most streams for a song in a day. The song debuted at number one on the UK Singles Chart, Adele's third UK number one, and had the highest first-week sales for a single since January 2017. Reaching the top of the Billboard Hot 100, it is her fifth US number-one single. On 28 October 2021, pre-sale tickets for her two concerts in Hyde Park, London, scheduled for 1 and 2 July 2022, sold out in less than an hour. The total number of tickets sold were 130,000, without prior promotion. More than 1.3 million people attempted to buy tickets for these two concerts. Jim King, CEO of the European Festivals division at AEG stated that Adele "could have sold several million tickets to the shows, such is the demand for her".

30 was released on 19 November 2021 and became a global success, reaching number one in 24 territories. In the UK, the album debuted at number one on the Official Albums Chart with 261,000 copies sold, garnering the largest opening week for an album since Ed Sheeran's Divide in 2017, and also has the highest first-week sales for an album by a female artist since Adele's own 25, becoming the best-selling album of 2021 in the country. In the US, it was Adele's third consecutive Billboard 200 number-one album and the year's best-seller as well. 30 was the best-selling album of 2021 worldwide, topping the Global Album All-Format Chart, Global Album Sales Chart, and the newly created Global Vinyl Album Chart. The album sold over 5.5 million pure copies within two months of its release. It was her first album to be marketed globally by Columbia Records instead of being split between XL Recordings and Beggars Group's regional distribution partners in most of the world and Columbia in North America.

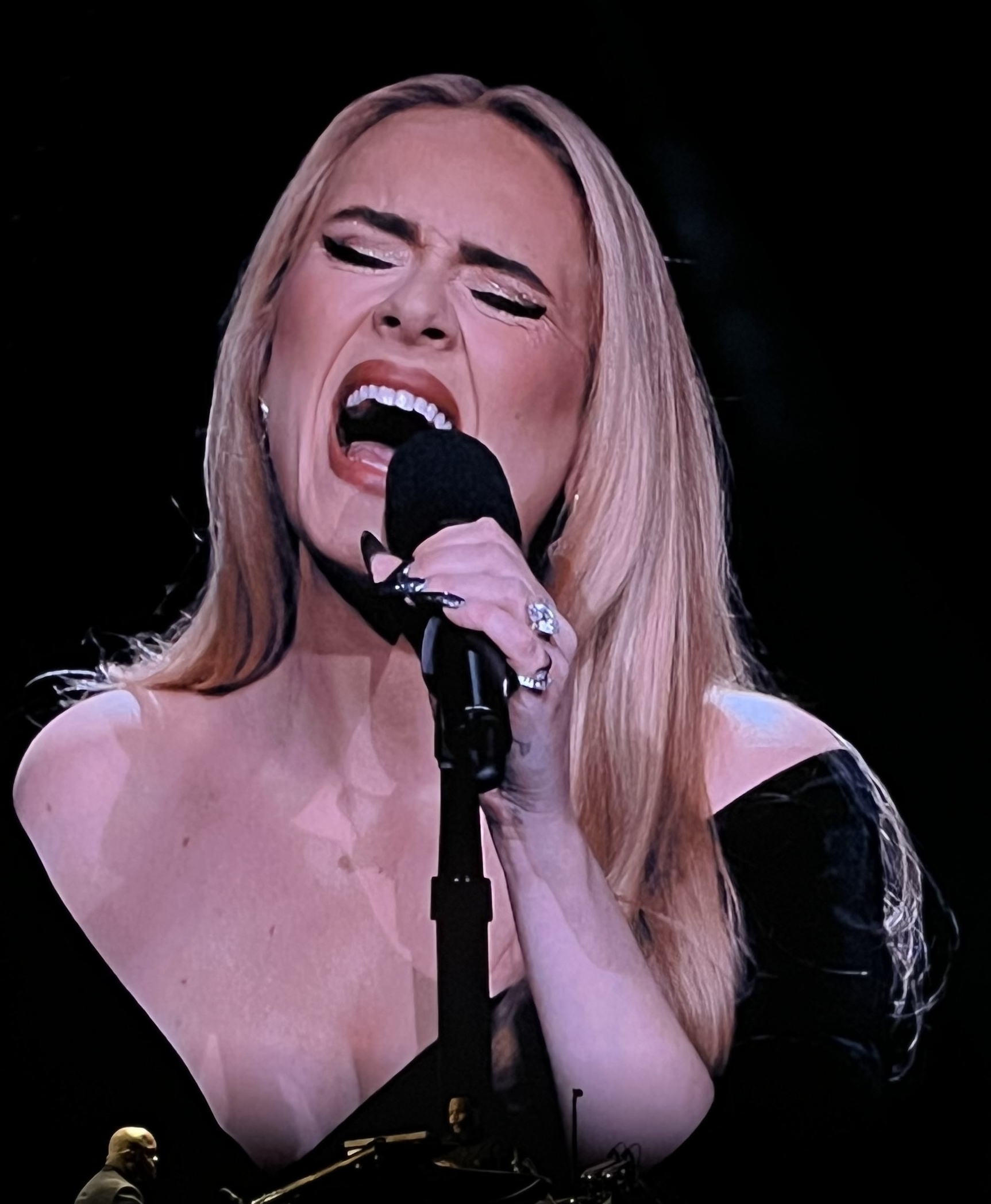
Adele performing during her Weekends with Adele, February 2023

On 30 November 2021, Adele announced a Las Vegas residency, Weekends with Adele, to run from 21 January 2022 until 16 April 2022 at the Colosseum at Caesars Palace. On 20 January 2022, Adele announced the residency was postponed due to "delivery delays" and the COVID-19 pandemic. On 8 February, 30 won British Album of the Year at the 42nd Brit Awards, making Adele the first solo artist in history to win the honour three times. On 25 July, it was announced her Las Vegas residency would run from 18 November 2022 to 25 March 2023, with eight more dates than initially planned, for a total of 32 concerts. On 3 September, Adele received a Primetime Emmy Award for Outstanding Variety Special (Pre-Recorded) for her Grammy-nominated television special Adele One Night Only. Weekends with Adele received widespread critical acclaim, In their review, Billboard called the performance "utterly and breathlessly spectacular" adding: "It was remarkable to see a performer at her level be so present and take in all she had accomplished in arriving at this moment." The New York Times explained how Adele cried several times throughout the show and described the setup: "Adele's stage is breathtaking, full of drama and elegance befitting her voice." In their four star review of the show, The Times said the performances were "spectacular, intimate and worth the wait". In November, during the residency's second weekend, Adele announced two additional dates on New Year's Eve weekend bringing the total amount of shows to 34.

Adele attended the 65th Annual Grammy Awards in February 2023, having received seven nominations. She took home the Grammy Award for Best Pop Solo Performance for "Easy on Me", extending her record as the artist with the most wins in the category. On what was supposed to be the last concert of her residency, 25 March, Adele announced that she would be extending her residency for another 34 shows with an intent to record a film "to make sure that anyone who wants to see the show [can see it]." In October, Adele extended her shows one last time, stylizing the extension as "Weekends with Adele: The Final Shows". This extension added 32 shows that began in January 2024 and ended in June.

At the end of January, Adele announced a string of four shows in August, dubbed "Adele in Munich", that she would perform at a custom-built venue in Munich with a capacity of 80,000. On 2 February, following "phenomenal demand", an additional four dates were announced for the shows, followed by a "final" two more on 6 February due to "unprecedented demand", bringing the total to ten. Tickets for the first four shows went on presale at 10 a.m. CET on 7 February, with a reported 3 million people queueing to get them at peak time. Presale tickets for the other six shows were released later that day.

On 16 July 2024, Adele revealed in an interview that she was taking an indefinite break from music following the end of her residency, with no plans for a new album at that time.

== Artistry ==
=== Influences and favourite musicians ===
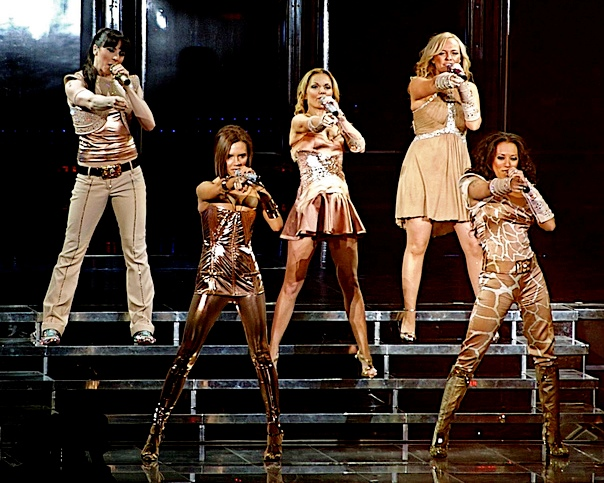
Adele credits the Spice Girls as a major influence on her love of music.

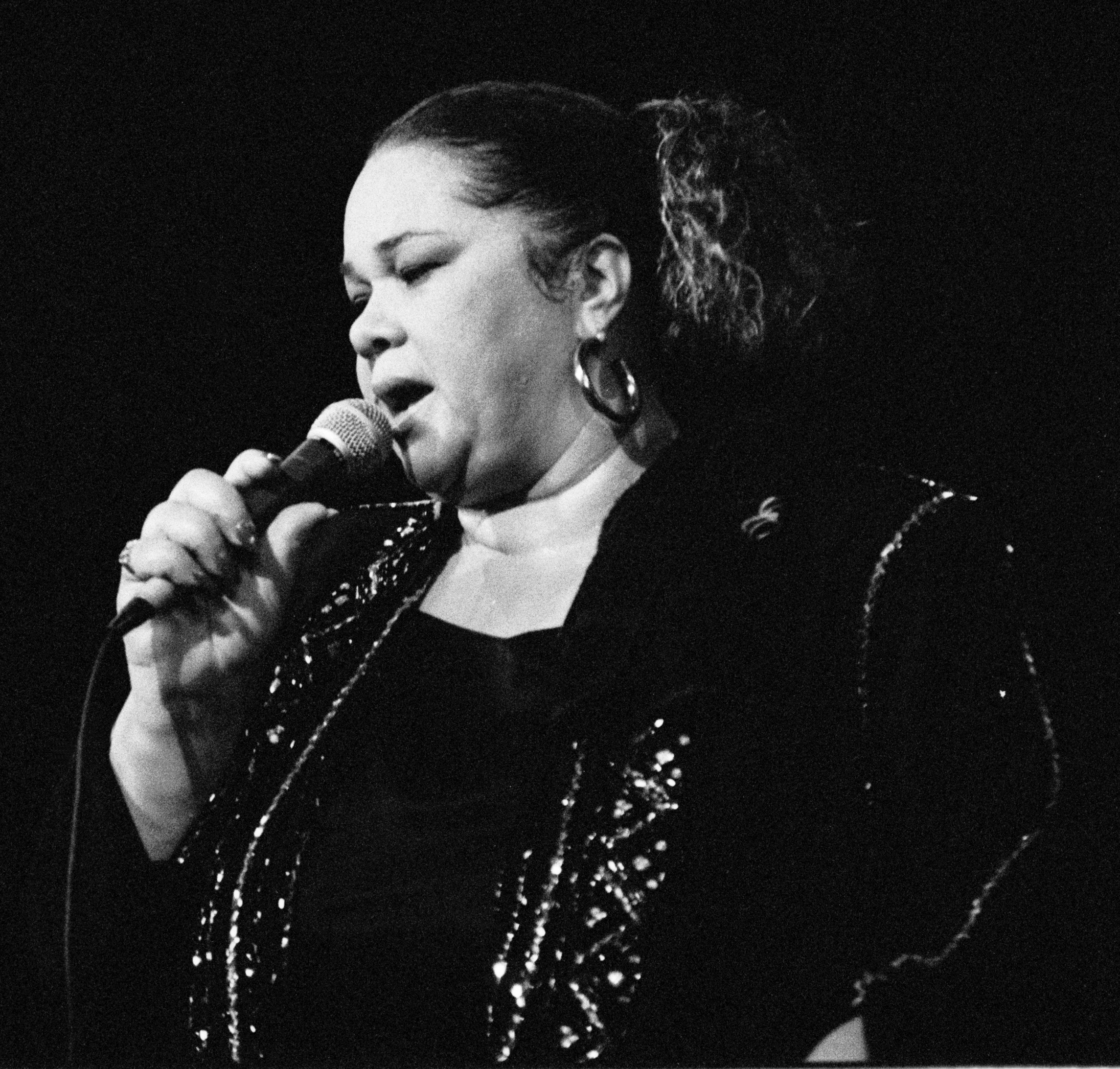
In her teens, Adele would listen to Etta James while developing and practising her singing abilities.

Adele has cited the Spice Girls as a major influence in regard to her love and passion for music, stating that "they made me what I am today". During childhood, she impersonated the Spice Girls at dinner parties. Her bedroom was "essentially a Spice Girls shrine" by the age of 11. She says she was "heartbroken" when her favourite Spice Girls member, Geri Halliwell aka "Ginger Spice", departed from the group. Lauryn Hill is also one of her major influences. In a 2011 interview, Adele deemed Hill's record The Miseducation of Lauryn Hill as her favourite album, while also stating "I was analyzing the record for about a month at the age of 8, I was constantly wondering when I would be that passionate about something, to write a record about it, even though I didn't know I was going to make a record when I was older"; while also thanking Hill "for existing" in a penned letter, that she dedicated in honour of the 20th anniversary of Hill's album. Growing up she also listened to Sinéad O'Connor, the Cranberries, Alanis Morissette, Bob Marley, the Cure, Dusty Springfield, Whitney Houston, Aretha Franklin, Celine Dion, Jeff Buckley, and Annie Lennox. Gabrielle was an early influence, whom Adele has admired since age five. During Adele's school years, her mother made her an eye patch with sequins which she used to perform as the Hackney-born star in a school talent contest.

After moving to south London, Adele became interested in R&B acts such as Aaliyah, Destiny's Child, Mary J. Blige, and Alicia Keys. She stated that one of the most defining moments in her life was when she saw Pink perform at Brixton Academy in London: "It was the Missundaztood record, so I was about 13 or 14. I had never heard, being in the room, someone sing like that live [...] I remember sort of feeling like I was in a wind tunnel, her voice just hitting me. It was incredible."

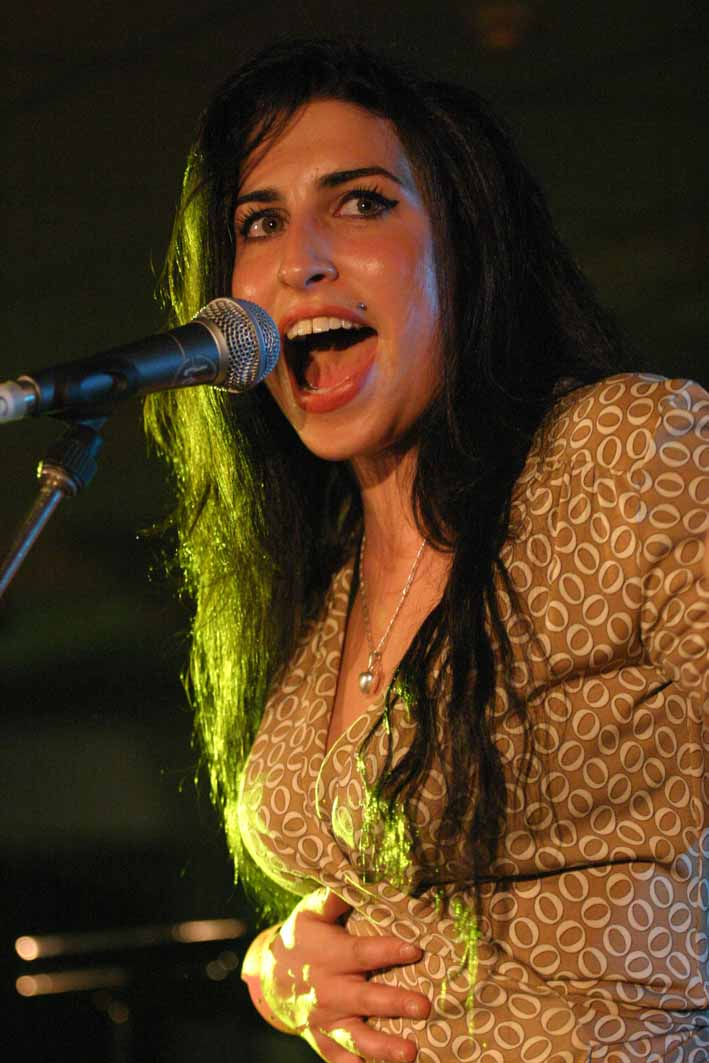
Adele credited Amy Winehouse and her album Frank for inspiring her to learn how to play the guitar.

In 2002, 14-year-old Adele discovered Etta James and Ella Fitzgerald as she stumbled on the artists' CDs in the jazz section of her local music store. She was struck by their appearance on the album covers. Adele states she then "started listening to Etta James every night for an hour," and in the process was getting "to know my own voice." She has credited Amy Winehouse and her 2003 album Frank with inspiring her to take up the guitar, saying: "If it wasn't for Amy and Frank, one hundred per cent I wouldn't have picked up a guitar, I wouldn't have written 'Daydreamer' or 'Hometown [Glory]' and I wrote 'Someone like You' on the guitar too."

Adele has also expressed admiration for Lana Del Rey, Grimes, Chvrches, FKA Twigs, Alabama Shakes, Kanye West, Rihanna, Britney Spears, Frank Ocean, Queen, and Stevie Nicks. In 2017, she described Beyoncé as a particular inspiration, calling her "[the] artist of my life" and added "the other artists who mean that much to me are all dead." Adele cited Madonna's 1998 album Ray of Light as a "chief inspiration" for her album 25. She stated that the release of 25 and her own comeback was inspired by Kate Bush, who made a comeback to the stage in 2014, 35 years after her last live shows from her only tour in 1979. Adele mentioned that Max Martin's work on Taylor Swift's "I Knew You Were Trouble" was the inspiration behind her song "Send My Love (To Your New Lover)", saying: "I was like, 'Who did this?' I knew it was Taylor, and I've always loved her, but this is a totally other side – like, 'I want to know who brought that out in her.' I was unaware that I knew who Max Martin was. I Googled him, and I was like, 'He's literally written every massive soundtrack of my life.' So I got my management to reach out. They came to London, and I took my guitar along and was like, 'I've got this riff,' and then 'Send My Love' happened really quickly."

=== Musical style ===
Adele's music is primarily pop and soul, with elements of blues, "classic R&B", country, gospel, jazz, and Motown. Her early success came while several other British soul singers were present on the music scene, with the British press dubbing her a new Amy Winehouse. However, Adele called the comparisons between her and other female soul singers lazy, noting "we're a gender, not a genre". AllMusic wrote that "Adele is simply too magical to compare her to anyone."

Adele's song topics often address heartbreak and relationship. Her second album, 21, shares the folk and soul influences of her debut album, but was further inspired by American country and Southern blues music to which she had been exposed during her 2008–09 tour An Evening with Adele in North America. Music critic Carl Wilson said that on 21, Adele was an "R&B belter aiming to represent a more 'organic' presence on the charts for those who hear beat-driven pop as too plastic". Conceived in the aftermath of Adele's break-up with a partner, the album typifies the near-dormant tradition of the confessional singer-songwriter in its exploration of heartbreak, self-examination, and forgiveness.

Having referred to 21 as a "break-up record", Adele labelled her third studio album, 25, a "make-up record", adding it is about "Making up for lost time. Making up for everything I ever did and never did." The New York Times wrote that on 30, "production on some songs feels in conversation with contemporary R&B".

=== Voice ===
"Clutching a Brits Critics' Choice Award before she'd even released her debut album, Adele had what seems like pre-ordained success, but it never would have happened without her extraordinary voice. Appropriately, her big, smoky pipes enter tonight before she does – singing from the wings, before she suddenly emerges, cackling "Awright Leeds." These first few seconds encapsulate her special connection with the public. A peculiar mixture of the sublime and the mundane. One minute she's adding an eerie tremor to the lyric "Of my world", the next she's explaining to the people pondering aloud just how one might Set Fire to the Rain, that the song was inspired "when mah lightah stopped workin'" in the wet."

— Dave Simpson of The Guardian on Adele's voice and down to earth persona.

Adele is a mezzo-soprano, with a range spanning from B_{2} to C_{6}. However, Classic FM states she is often mistaken for a contralto due to the application of a tense chest mix to reach the lower notes, while also noting that her voice becomes its clearest as she ascends the register, particularly from C_{4} to C_{5}. Rolling Stone reported that following throat surgery her voice had become "palpably bigger and purer-toned", and that she had added a further four notes to the top of her range. Initially, critics suggested that her vocals were more developed and intriguing than her songwriting, a sentiment with which Adele agreed. She has stated: "I taught myself how to sing by listening to Ella Fitzgerald for acrobatics and scales, Etta James for passion and Roberta Flack for control."

Adele's singing has received acclaim from music critics. In a review of 19, The Observer stated, "The way she stretched the vowels, her wonderful soulful phrasing, the sheer unadulterated pleasure of her voice, stood out all the more; little doubt that she's a rare singer". BBC Music wrote, "Her melodies exude warmth, her singing is occasionally stunning and, ...she has tracks that make Lily Allen and Kate Nash sound every bit as ordinary as they are." Also in 2008, Sylvia Patterson of The Guardian wrote, "Of all the gobby new girls, only Adele's bewitching singing voice has the enigmatic quality which causes tears of involuntary emotion to splash down your face in the way Eva Cassidy's did before her." For their reviews of 21, The New York Times' chief music critic Jon Pareles commended Adele's emotive timbre, likening her to Dusty Springfield, Petula Clark, and Annie Lennox: "[Adele] can seethe, sob, rasp, swoop, lilt and belt, in ways that draw more attention to the song than to the singer". Ryan Reed of Paste magazine regarded her voice as "a raspy, aged-beyond-its-years thing of full-blooded beauty", while MSN Music's Tom Townshend called her "the finest singer of [our] generation". Adele has also been dubbed a "vocal goddess".

== Personal life ==
In 2011, Adele began a relationship with charity entrepreneur Simon Konecki. Their son was born in 2012. On the topic of becoming a parent, Adele said she "felt like I was truly living. I had a purpose, where before I didn't". Adele and Konecki brought a privacy case against a UK-based photo agency that published intrusive paparazzi images of their son taken during family outings in 2013. Lawyers working on their behalf accepted damages from the company in July 2014. Adele has also opened up about suffering from postpartum depression, anxiety, and panic attacks.

In early 2017, tabloids started speculating that Adele and Konecki had secretly married when they were spotted wearing matching rings on their ring fingers. During her acceptance speech at the 59th Annual Grammy Awards for Album of the Year, Adele seemed to have confirmed these reports by referring to Konecki as "my husband" when thanking him. She repeated this in March 2017, telling the audience at a concert in Brisbane, Australia, "I'm married now". However, in a 2021 interview with British Vogue, she revealed that they actually married in 2018, and separated the same year. During this time, Adele became a stay-at-home mother. In April 2019, Adele's representatives confirmed the separation via Associated Press, and affirmed that she and Konecki would continue to raise their son together. On 13 September 2019, Adele filed for divorce from Konecki, with it being finalised on 4 March 2021. In 2021, Adele entered into a relationship with American sports agent Rich Paul. During her performance in Munich on 9 August 2024, she revealed her engagement to Paul.

In 2015, Adele said, "I'm a feminist, I believe that everyone should be treated the same, including race and sexuality". Supportive of the LGBT community, on 12 June 2016, an emotional Adele dedicated her show in Antwerp, Belgium, to the victims of the mass shooting at a gay nightclub in Orlando, Florida, United States, earlier that day, adding, "The LGBTQ community, they're like my soul mates since I was really young, so I'm very moved by it."

Adele became an ordained minister to officiate at the wedding of the comedian Alan Carr and Paul Drayton. The wedding, held in January 2018, took place in the garden of her house in Los Angeles, California. On 14 October 2023, during a concert of her Weekends with Adele residency, Adele revealed that she had suffered from "borderline alcoholism" since her 20s and that she had been sober for three months.

As of June 2023, she lives in North Beverly Park, in the Los Angeles area.

=== Politics ===
Adele has been a supporter of the Labour Party, saying in 2011 that she was a "Labour girl through and through", and in the same interview was critical of the Conservative Party. Adele received backlash for her comments on paying taxes during a 2011 interview with Q. She said, "I use the NHS, I can't use public transport any more, doing what I do, I went to state school, I'm mortified to have to pay 50 percent! Trains are always late, most state schools are shit and I've gotta give you like four million quid, are you having a laugh? When I got my tax bill in from 19 I was ready to go and buy a gun and randomly open fire."

=== Wealth ===
In 2012, Adele topped the List of Richest Young Musicians under 30 in the UK, included on the Sunday Times Rich List. In July 2012, she was listed at number six in Forbes list of the world's highest-paid celebrities under the age of 30, having earned £23 million between May 2011 and May 2012. For six consecutive years, from 2013 to 2018, Adele topped the List of Richest Young Musicians under 30 in the UK and Ireland as part of the Sunday Times' annual Rich List. In 2015, Adele said she declined all sorts of lucrative endorsement offers out of personal choice. In 2015, she reported paying £4 million tax in the UK. In July 2016, Adele was ranked number nine on the Forbes list of the 100 highest-paid celebrities in the world. In November 2016 and November 2017, she was in second place on the Forbes list of the world's highest-paid women in music, earning US$80.5 million and $69 million, respectively. The Sunday Times Rich List valued her wealth at £125 million in 2017, and she was ranked the 19th UK's richest musician overall whilst being the only woman in the top 20. Adele owns and operates two companies, Melted Stone Ltd and Melted Stone Publishing. In 2017, she earned $11.2 million in royalties from record sales, after taxes, according to official documents from her companies, without any new album release at the time, and whilst spending her time off. On the 2019 Sunday Times Rich List, Adele was valued at £150 million (US$180.5 million) as the 22nd-richest musician in the UK despite not having toured since 2017.

In 2012, Adele and then-partner Konecki purchased a $3.4 million Art Deco villa in Portslade, on the outskirts of Brighton and Hove, which she sold for $3.7 million in 2016. That same year, she bought two houses built side-by-side in Kensington for $7.7 million and $7.3 million, respectively, with the intention of combining them. Adele also bought a home for her mother in West London for around $817,000. In 2013, she temporarily rented Paul McCartney's 12,000-square-foot (1,100 m^{2}) former mansion for an undisclosed price. In 2015, Adele purchased a $5.2 million Mediterranean-style vacation mansion in Malibu, California, and sold it in 2017 for less than its original purchase price, $4.8 million. She envisioned buying several properties on the same street in a Beverly Hills gated community, beginning with the first home purchased for $9.5 million from Don Mischer in 2016. During her Madison Square Garden tour in September 2016, Adele rented NBA player Deron Williams' Tribeca apartment for three weeks at a monthly rent of $60,000. In 2017, she and Konecki purchased a $5.3 million Tudor mansion called Ridge Hill Manor, located in the English countryside on the outskirts of East Grinstead. In 2019 and 2021, Adele bought two more Beverly Hills mansions for $10.65 million and $10 million; the latter was purchased from Nicole Richie and her husband, Joel Madden. In February 2022, it was reported that Adele had bought Sylvester Stallone's 21,000-square-foot (2,000 m^{2}) former mansion in Beverly Park, Los Angeles, for $58 million.

=== Philanthropy ===
Adele has performed in numerous charity concerts throughout her career. In 2007 and 2008, she performed at the Little Noise Sessions held at London's Union Chapel, with proceeds from the concerts donated to Mencap, which works with people with learning disabilities. In July and November 2008, Adele performed at the Keep a Child Alive Black Ball in London and New York City respectively. On 17 September 2009, she performed at the Brooklyn Academy of Music, for the VH1 Divas event, a concert to raise money for the Save The Music Foundation charity. On 6 December, Adele opened with a 40-minute set at John Mayer's 2nd Annual Holiday Charity Revue held at the Nokia Theatre in Los Angeles. In 2011, Adele took part in the UK charity telethon Comic Relief for Red Nose Day 2011, performing "Someone like You".

Adele has been a major contributor to MusiCares, a charity organisation founded by the National Academy of Recording Arts and Sciences for musicians in need. In February 2009, Adele performed at the 2009 MusiCares charity concert in Los Angeles. In 2011 and 2012, Adele donated autographed items for auctions to support MusiCares. Adele required all backstage visitors to the North American leg of her Adele Live tour to donate a minimum charitable contribution of US$20 for the UK charity SANDS, an organisation dedicated to "supporting anyone affected by the death of a baby and promoting research to reduce the loss of babies' lives".

On 15 June 2017, Adele attended a vigil in west London for the victims of the Grenfell Tower fire where, keeping a low profile, she was only spotted by a handful of fans. Four days later she appeared at Chelsea fire station and brought cakes for the firefighters. Station manager Ben King stated "She came in, came up to the mess and had a cup of tea with the watch and then she joined us for the minute's silence." Paying tribute to the victims at her first Wembley show on 28 June, Adele encouraged fans to donate money to help the victims of the blaze rather than waste the money on "overpriced wine".

== Legacy ==
The Seattle Post-Intelligencer has called Adele the "Queen of Soul" for her early success as a soul singer-songwriter, while she was referred to as the "Queen of Hearts" by publications such as Vogue and Vanity Fair. In 2014, Adele was already being regarded as a British cultural icon, with young adults from abroad naming her among a group of people whom they most associated with UK culture, which included William Shakespeare, Queen Elizabeth II, David Beckham, J. K. Rowling, the Beatles, Charlie Chaplin, and Elton John. In their respective 2019 and 2020 publications, authors Ali Pantony and Arwa Mahdawi also regarded Adele as a British cultural icon.

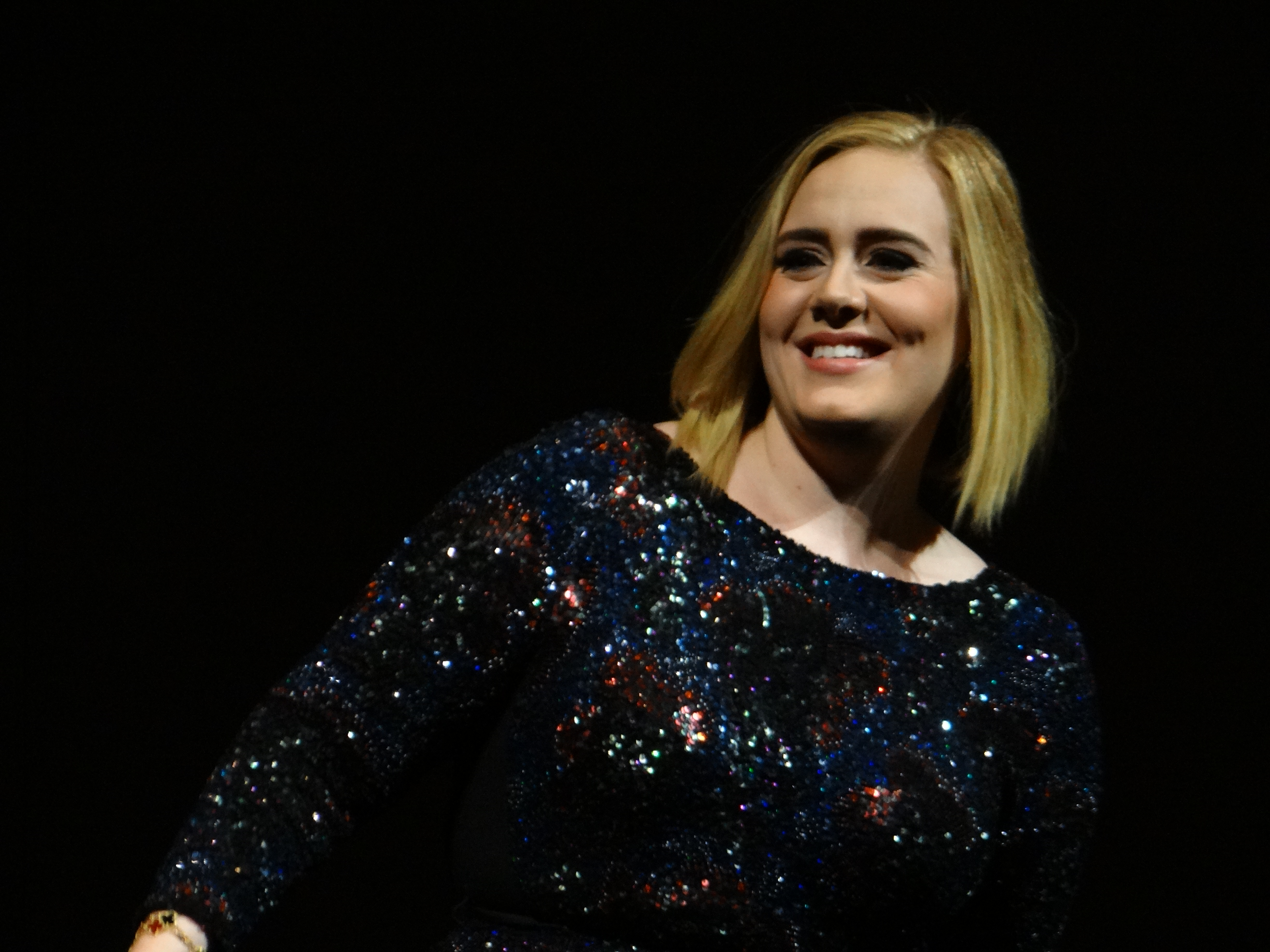
Adele was frequently credited in the 2010s for reviving the lagging sales of the music industry in the streaming era.

Richard Russell, the founder of record label XL Recordings, complimented Adele, saying she had the potential to change the way women were seen in the music industry by focusing on music rather than sexuality. The New Yorker called her "the most popular living soul singer in the world" at 27-years-old. Writing for Vulture, Jillian Mapes opined that Adele is "among the first plus-size female cultural icons to reach the highest echelons of commercial success without having to make herself the butt of fat jokes along the way". Time journalist Sam Lansky described her as "a voice for every generation" and further stated that "Adele bridges pop music's past and its future". Lansky wrote that Adele, by choosing to sound "like the past", goes in the opposite direction from her contemporaries in mainstream music, who "try to sound simultaneously like each other" and follow trends.

Billboard credited Adele for reviving the music industry in 2011, the year of 21's release, and wrote: "She was a unique presence not only in 2011, but in all of the 21st-century pop: a preternaturally gifted singer and songwriter with a leave-it-all-on-the-floor approach to recording and performing—and also an earthy, relatable, and strangely unassuming personality both on and off the stage". Junkee and Consequence of Sound credited her for revitalizing pop music and heralding "a new era of relatable pop" due to the critical and commercial success of 21. In an article about how music from 2011 defined pop music, Junkee also credited Adele for reviving the break-up ballad music, paving the way for young artists like Olivia Rodrigo to use some elements of pop ballads that she did into their own music. In a 2021 article from The Daily Telegraph, James Hall wrote that "a new Adele album isn't just a release − it's a global cultural event". Rolling Stone writers observed that "She has written more modern pop standards than anyone else in her generation, each single becoming an instant classic."

In 2016, Consequence ranked Adele at number 34 on its list of The 100 Greatest Singers of All Time, describing her voice as "athletic and authentic" and "an unapologetic powerhouse with a knack for tone and an ability to imbue her performances with genuine emotion". In 2019, Insider Inc. listed her among the top artists of the decade, and wrote: "Her artistry and style broke through in a time of ultra club-happy pop music, and paved the way for other artists to break the mold". Rolling Stone listed Adele at 22nd in their 2023 list of 200 Greatest Singers of All Time, while The Times named her as 2nd best singer of the 21st century in their list of 20 best solo singers.

Adele and her work have influenced numerous singers, including Beyoncé, Britney Spears, Lauren Daigle, Billie Eilish, Rebecca Ferguson, Jess Glynne, Conan Gray, Freya Ridings, Harry Styles, Sigrid, Sam Smith, Tom Walker, Selena Gomez, Lizzo, Celine Dion, and Sabrina Carpenter.

== Achievements ==
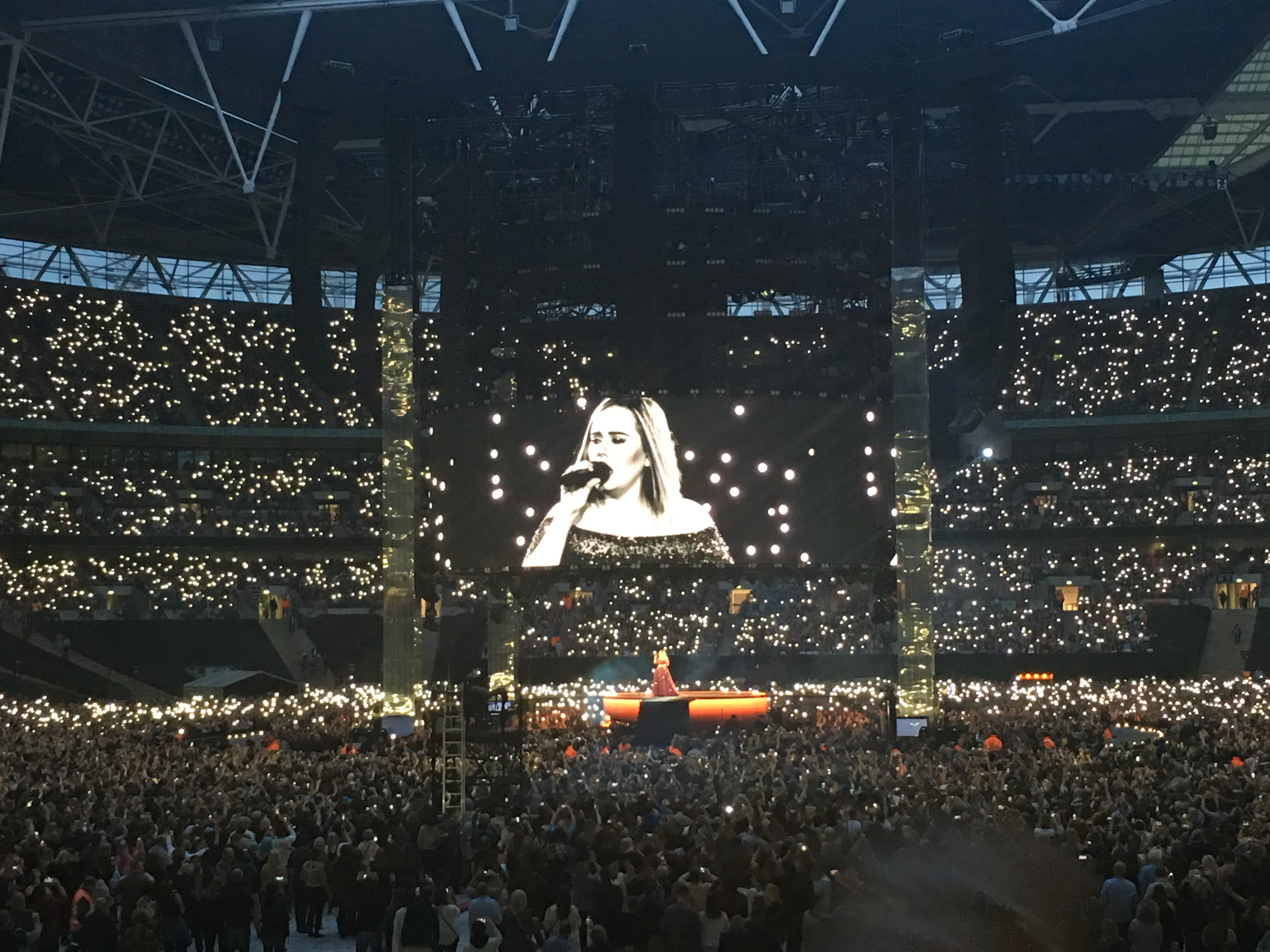
Adele at Wembley Stadium in June 2017. Adele's concert on 28 June had 98,000 attendees, a stadium record for a UK music event.

Adele has sold more than 120 million records worldwide with 70 million in album sales and over 50 million in single sales as of 2022, making her one of the world's best-selling music artists. She is one of the highest-earning music artists in the world.

At the 51st Annual Grammy Awards in 2009, 21-year-old Adele won awards in the categories of Best New Artist and Best Female Pop Vocal Performance. She was also nominated for Record of the Year and Song of the Year. The success of her debut album 19 saw Adele nominated for three Brit Awards in the categories of British Female Solo Artist, British Single of the Year and British Breakthrough Act. Then British Prime Minister Gordon Brown sent a thank-you letter to Adele that stated "with the troubles that the country's in financially, you're a light at the end of the tunnel".

Adele's second album, 21, earned her a record-tying six Grammy Awards, including Album of the Year, and two Brit Awards, including British Album of the Year. Adele was the second artist and first female, preceded by Christopher Cross, to have won all four of the general field awards throughout her career. The success of the album saw her receive numerous mentions in the Guinness Book of World Records. With 21 non-consecutive weeks at number one in the US, Adele broke the record for the longest number-one album by a female in Billboard history, beating the record formerly held by Whitney Houston's soundtrack The Bodyguard. 21 spent its 23rd week at number one in March 2012, making it the longest-running album at number one since 1985, and it became the fourth-best-selling album of the past 10 years in the US. It is the second-best-selling album in the UK of all time, the best selling album in the UK of the 21st century, and the best selling album by a woman in UK chart history. 21 was her first album certified diamond in the US. On 6 March, 21 reached 30 non-consecutive weeks at number one on the Australian ARIA Chart, making it the longest-running number one album in Australia in the 21st century, and the second longest-running number one ever. At one point in 2011, a copy of Adele's 21 and 19 albums was sold every seven seconds in the UK.

In May 2011, "Team Adele" was ranked number one on The Guardian's "Music Power 100" list: "the 100 most influential people in the music industry". In February 2012, Adele was listed at number five on VH1's 100 Greatest Women in Music. In April 2012, Time magazine named Adele one of the 100 most influential people in the world. People named her one of 2012 Most Beautiful at Every Age. Rolling Stone ranked her no. 22 on their list of 200 Best Singers of All Time in 2023. On 30 April 2012, a tribute to Adele was held at New York City's (Le) Poisson Rouge called Broadway Sings Adele, starring various Broadway actors such as Matt Doyle.

In the week ending 3 March 2012, Adele became the first solo female artist to have three singles in the top 10 of the Billboard Hot 100 at the same time with "Rolling in the Deep", "Someone Like You", and "Set Fire to the Rain" as well as the first female artist to have two albums in the top 5 of the Billboard 200 and two singles in the top 5 of the Billboard Hot 100 simultaneously. Adele topped the 2012 Sunday Times Rich List of musicians in the UK under 30, and made the Top 10 of Billboard magazine's "Top 40 Money Makers". Billboard also announced the same day that Adele's "Rolling in the Deep" is the biggest crossover hit of the past 25 years, topping pop, adult pop and adult contemporary charts and that Adele is one of four female artists to have an album chart at number one for more than 13 weeks (the other three artists being Judy Garland, Carole King, and Whitney Houston).

At the 2012 Ivor Novello Awards in May, Adele was named Songwriter of the Year, and "Rolling in the Deep" won the award for Most Performed Work of 2011. At the 2012 BMI Awards held in London in October, Adele won Song of the Year (for "Rolling in the Deep") in recognition of the song being the most played on US television and radio in 2011. In 2013, Adele won the Academy Award for Best Original Song for the James Bond theme "Skyfall". This is the first James Bond song to win and the fifth to be nominated—after "For Your Eyes Only" (1981), "Nobody Does It Better" (1977), "Live and Let Die" (1973), and "The Look of Love" (1967). "Skyfall" won the Brit Award for Best British Single at the 33rd Brit Awards.

In February 2013, she was named one of the 100 most powerful women in the UK by Woman's Hour on BBC Radio 4. Later that year, in June, Adele was appointed an MBE in the Queen's Birthday Honours list for services to music, and she received the award from Prince Charles at Buckingham Palace on 19 December 2013.

Released in 2015, Adele's third album, 25, became the year's best-selling album and broke first week sales records in a number of markets, including the UK and the US. 25 was her second album to be certified diamond in the US and earned her five Grammy Awards, including her second Grammy Award for Album of the Year, and four Brit Awards, including her second Brit Award for British Album. Adele became the only artist in history to, on two separate occasions, win the three general categories Grammys in the same ceremony. With 15 awards from 18 nominations, Adele won more Grammys than any other woman who was born outside the US. Adele's seven weeks at the top of the UK Albums Chart took her total to 31 weeks at number one in the UK with her three albums, surpassing Madonna's previous record of most weeks at number one for a female act in the UK. The lead single, "Hello", became the first song in the US to sell over one million digital copies within a week of its release.

At the 2016 Ivor Novello Awards Adele was named Songwriter of the Year for the second time by the British Academy of Songwriters, Composers, and Authors. In April 2016 she appeared for the second time on the Time 100 list of the world's most influential people. Adele was inducted into the Royal Albert Hall's Walk of Fame in 2018, making her one of the first eleven recipients of a star on the walk. Despite releasing just two albums in the decade (21 and 25), at 36 weeks she had the second most weeks at number one in the UK Album Charts in the 2010s, five weeks behind Ed Sheeran (who released four albums). Her studio albums 21 and 25 were the top two best-selling albums of the 2010s in the UK. In December 2019, Israel's largest TV and radio stations named her singer of the 2010s.

In 2021, Adele was named the UK's best-selling female album artist of the 21st century, based on Official Charts data. In May 2022, Time magazine named her for the third time among the 100 most influential people in the world in the "icons" category. As Adele has won Emmy, Grammy, and Oscar Awards, it makes her a Tony Award away from achieving EGOT status as of 2022. In December 2023, she was listed in The Hollywood Reporter's 2023 Women in Entertainment Power 100, and received the Sherry Lansing Leadership Award. Billboard listed her at number 4 on its 2025 "Top 100 Women Artists of the 21st Century" list.

== Discography ==
- 19 (2008)
- 21 (2011)
- 25 (2015)
- 30 (2021)

== Filmography ==
Year	Title	Notes	Ref.
2007	Later... with Jools Holland	Episode: 8 June 2007	
2008	Later... with Jools Holland	Episode: 1 April 2008	
2008	Never Mind the Buzzcocks	Episode: 4 October 2008	
2008	Saturday Night Live	Episode: "Josh Brolin / Adele"	
2008	BBC Electric Proms	Episode: 22 October 2008	
2008	Sound	Episode: 6 December 2008	
2008	Jools' Annual Hootenanny	Episode: 31 December 2008	
2009	Ugly Betty	Episode: "In the Stars": Cameo appearance	
2009	Never Mind the Buzzcocks	Episode: 23 July 2009	
2011	Later... with Jools Holland	Episode: 6 May 2011	
2012	Adele Live at the Royal Albert Hall	Features highlights of her concert at Royal Albert Hall in London on 21 September 2011 as part of her Adele Live tour	
2015	Adele at the BBC	British television special featuring performances from the album 25 and an interview with Graham Norton	
2015	Saturday Night Live	Episode: "Matthew McConaughey / Adele"	
2015	Adele Live in New York City	American television special featuring performances from the album 25 and celebrity audience members; also executive producer	
2016	Glastonbury 2016	Features singer headlines the Pyramid Stage at Glastonbury Festival	
2020	Saturday Night Live	Episode: "Adele / H.E.R."	
2021	Adele One Night Only	American television special featuring performances from the album 30 and an interview with Oprah Winfrey; also executive producer	
2021	An Audience with Adele	British television special featuring performances from the album 30 and celebrity audience members	
2025	Untitled Weekends with Adele concert film	A concert film recorded during the Weekends with Adele show.	
TBA	Cry to Heaven	Acting debut	

== Tours ==
Headlining concerts

- An Evening with Adele (2008–2009)
- Adele Live (2011)
- Adele Live 2016 (2016–2017)

Residencies

- Weekends with Adele (2022–2024)
- Adele in Munich (2024)

== See also ==
- List of best-selling music artists – Artists with sales of over 120 million records worldwide
- List of British Grammy Award winners and nominees
- List of Billboard Social 50 number-one artists
- List of artists who reached number one in the United States
- List of most-streamed artists on Spotify
- Mononymous person

== Notes ==
Awards and achievements
Preceded by Randy Newman	Academy Award for Best Original Song; 2012	Succeeded by Kristen Lopez and Robert Lopez
Preceded by Paloma Faith	Brit Award for British Female Solo Artist; 2016	Succeeded by Emeli Sandé
Preceded by Laura Marling	Brit Award for British Female Solo Artist; 2012	Succeeded by Emeli Sandé
Preceded by Amy Winehouse	Grammy Award for Best New Artist; 2009	Succeeded by Zac Brown Band

Preceded by Jack White and Alicia Keys "Another Way to Die", 2008	James Bond title artist "Skyfall", 2012	Succeeded by Sam Smith "Writing's on the Wall", 2015
