= List of awards and nominations received by Adele =

Adele awards and nominations
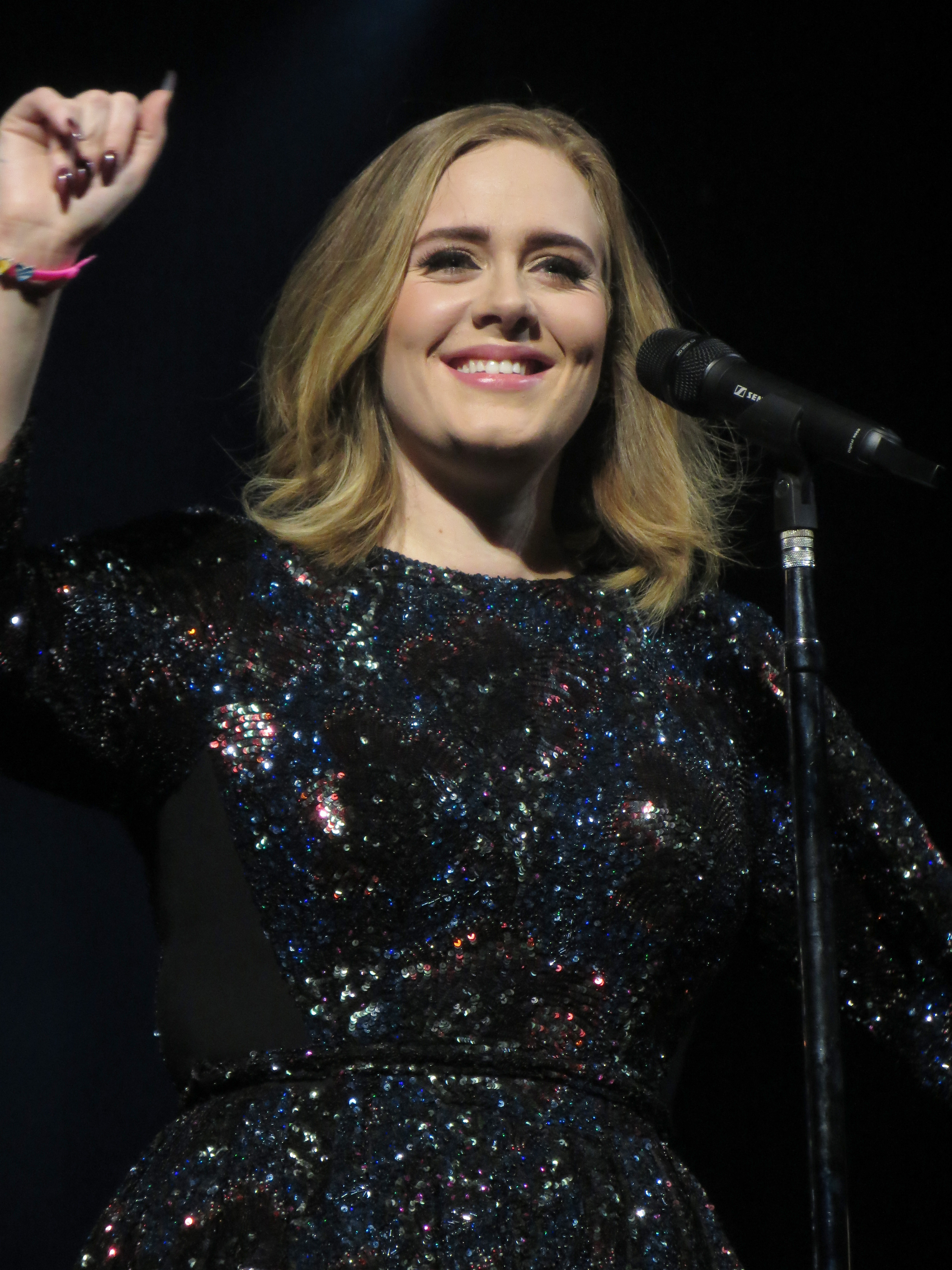
- Adele performing at Glasgow SSE Hydro on 26 March 2016
Awards and nominations
Award	Wins	Nominations
Academy Awards	1	1
American Music Awards	5	9
AIM Independent Music Awards	4	4
APRA Awards (Australia)	1	2
Arqiva Commercial Radio Awards	1	1
ARIA Music Awards	0	4
BET Awards	0	1
Bravo Otto	1	1
British Academy Television Awards	0	3
BBC Sound of...	1	1
BBC Music Awards	4	5
BBC Radio 1 Teen Awards	1	1
Billboard Music Awards	18	40
Billboard Touring Awards	1	1
BMI Film & TV Awards Awards	1	1
BMI London Awards	10	10
BMI Pop Music Awards	4	4
Brit Awards	12	19
British LGBT Awards	0	1
BT Digital Music Awards	1	6
CMT Music Awards	0	1
Critics' Choice Movie Awards	1	1
Danish Music Awards	1	3
Daytime Emmy Awards	0	1
ECHO Music Awards	3	5
Edinburgh TV Awards	1	1
European Border Breakers Award	1	1
Fryderyk	1	1
GAFFA Awards (Denmark)	6	8
GAFFA Awards (Sweden)	5	5
Gaygalan Awards	0	1
Glamour Awards	2	2
Global Awards	0	3
Golden Globe Awards	1	1
Grammis Awards	1	1
Grammy Awards	16	25
Guinness World Records	19	19
Helpmann Awards	0	1
Houston Film Critics Society	1	1
IFPI Global Recording Artist Award	1	1
iHeartRadio Music Awards	5	12
Independent Music Companies Association	1	1
Ivor Novello Awards	3	9
Juno Awards	2	3
Latin American Music Awards	0	1
Los 40 Music Awards	1	8
Mercury Prize	0	2
MOBO Awards	1	5
MuchMusic Video Awards	0	4
Music Business Association	1	1
MTV Africa Music Awards	0	1
MTV Italy Music Awards	0	3
MTV Europe Music Awards	1	10
MTV Video Music Awards	3	20
MTV Video Music Brazil	0	1
MTV Video Music Awards Japan	0	2
mtvU Woodie Awards	0	1
NAACP Image Awards	0	2
New Music Awards	1	1
Nickelodeon Kids' Choice Awards	2	9
Nickelodeon UK Kids Choice Awards	2	2
NME Awards	1	7
NRJ Music Awards	3	4
People's Choice Awards	1	12
Pollstar Awards	2	6
Premios Juventud	2	3
Premios Odeón	1	2
Premios Oye!	2	2
Primetime Emmy Awards	1	2
Q Awards	2	6
Radio Disney Music Awards	0	2
Satellite Awards	0	1
Shorty Awards	1	1
Soul Train Music Awards	0	5
South Bank Sky Arts Awards	0	1
Space Shower Music Awards	0	1
Swiss Music Awards	4	4
Teen Choice Awards	0	6
UK Music Video Awards	2	7
Urban Music Awards	1	4
World Soundtrack Awards	1	1
ZD Awards	0	1
Žebřík Music Awards	3	3

Totals (Note: Certain award groups do not simply award one winner. They acknowledge several different recipients, have runners-up, and have third place. Since this is a specific recognition and is different from losing an award, runner-up mentions are considered wins in this award tally. For simplification and to avoid errors, each award in this list has been presumed to have had a prior nomination.)
- Wins: 539
- Nominations: About 760

The English singer-songwriter Adele has received various awards and nominations. She is the recipient of sixteen Grammy Awards, an Academy Award, a Primetime Emmy Award, a Golden Globe Award, eighteen Billboard Music Awards, twelve Brit Awards, five American Music Awards, and two Ivor Novello Awards, each for Songwriter of the Year.

Adele signed a contract with the record label XL Recordings in September 2006. She won the BBC Sound of 2008, an annual poll awarded to recognise newcomers in the music industry. Later in the same year, she won the Brits Critics' Choice, and released her debut album 19 to international success. Adele was named the Best New Artist at the 51st Annual Grammy Awards, while "Chasing Pavements" received three nominations for Record of the Year, Song of the Year, and Best Female Pop Vocal Performance, winning the later award. Her debut single "Hometown Glory" earned another nomination for Best Female Pop Vocal Performance at the 52nd Annual Grammy Awards.

Adele's second studio album 21 was released in January 2011 and held the top position for 24 weeks in the United States. Three of its singles—"Rolling in the Deep", "Someone like You", and "Set Fire to the Rain"—reached number one on the Billboard Hot 100. The former won three Grammy Awards – Record of the Year, Song of the Year, and Best Short Form Music Video. 21 won Album of the Year and Best Pop Vocal Album. "Someone like You" and "Set Fire to the Rain" won Best Pop Solo Performance at the 54th and 55th Annual Grammy Awards, respectively. Adele was awarded several other accolades, including the Echo Music Award for Album of the Year, and won in 12 Billboard Music Award categories. In 2012, she released "Skyfall", a song of the 2012 James Bond film of the same name. The song won a Brit Award for British Single; the Academy Award, and Golden Globe for Best Original Song; and a Grammy Award. Adele received five awards at the 2016 Billboard Music Awards, including one for her third studio album 25. She also won the British Album of the Year at the 36th Brit Awards, in addition to winning three other awards. The album also won Grammy Awards for Album of the Year and Best Pop Vocal Album, and the single "Hello" received Record of the Year, Song of the Year and Best Pop Solo Performance at the 59th Annual Grammy Awards. After a six years hiatus, Adele released her fourth studio album 30 to critical acclaim and global success. The album has garnered her four nominations at the 42nd Brit Awards, including her third consecutive win for British Album of the Year. The album also received six nominations at the 65th Annual Grammy Awards, including her third consecutive nomination for Album of the Year.

== Academy Awards ==
The Academy Awards are a set of awards given annually for excellence of cinematic achievements, and are organised by the Academy of Motion Picture Arts and Sciences (AMPAS). The annual Oscar presentation has been held since 1929. Adele has received 1 award from 1 nomination.

Year	Nominee / work	Award	Result	Ref.
2013	"Skyfall"	Best Original Song	Won	

== American Music Awards ==
The American Music Awards (AMAs) is an annual music awards show created by Dick Clark in 1973. Adele has won 5 awards from 14 nominations.

Year	Nominee / work	Award	Result	Ref.
2011	Adele			
2011	Adele	Artist of the Year	Nominated	
2011	Adele	Favorite Adult Contemporary Artist	Won	
2011	Adele	Favorite Pop/Rock Female Artist	Won	
2011	21	Favorite Pop/Rock Album	Won	
2012	Adele	Favorite Adult Contemporary Artist	Won	
2016	Adele	Favorite Adult Contemporary Artist	Won	
2016	Adele	Favorite Pop/Rock Female Artist	Nominated	
2016	25	Favorite Pop/Rock Album	Nominated	
2016	"Hello"	Favorite Pop/Rock Song	Nominated	
2022	Adele	Artist of the Year	Nominated	
2022	Adele	Favorite Female Pop Artist	Nominated	
2022	"Easy on Me"	Favorite Music Video	Nominated	
2022	"Easy on Me"	Favorite Pop Song	Nominated	
2022	30	Favorite Pop Album	Nominated	

== AIM Independent Music Awards ==
The AIM Independent Music Awards, hosted by the Association of Independent Music (AIM), were established in 2011 to recognise artists signed to independent record labels in the United Kingdom. Most of the categories and nominations are selected by an independent judging panel, though some are decided by the public. Adele has received 4 awards from 4 nominations.

Year	Nominee / work	Award	Result	Ref.
2011	Adele	Most Played Independent Act	Won	
2011	21	Best "Difficult" Second Album	Won	
2012	Adele	Most Played Independent Act	Won	
2016	"Hello"	Independent Track of the Year	Won	

== APRA Awards (Australia) ==
The APRA Awards are annually held by Australasian Performing Right Association (APRA) to honor outstanding music artists and songwriters of the year. Adele has received 1 win from 2 nominations.

Year	Nominee / work	Award	Result	Ref.
2012	"Rolling in the Deep"	International Work of the Year	Nominated	
2017	"Hello"	International Work of the Year	Won	
2023	"Easy On Me"	Most Performed International Work of the Year	Nominated	

== Arqiva Commercial Radio Awards ==
The Arqiva Commercial Radio Awards is an annual award ceremony celebrating the success of the British commercial radio industry. Adele has received 1 award from 1 nomination.

Year	Nominee / work	Award	Result	Ref.
2012	Adele	(PPL) Most Played UK Artist on Commercial Radio	Won	

== ARIA Music Awards ==
The ARIA Music Awards, hosted by the Australian Recording Industry Association (ARIA), recognise "excellence and innovation across all genres" of music in Australia. Adele has been nominated 5 times.

Year	Nominee / work	Award	Result	Ref.
2011	Adele	Most Popular International Artist	Nominated	
2012	21	Best International Artist	Nominated	
2016	25	Best International Artist	Nominated	
2017	25	Best International Artist	Nominated	
2022	30	Best International Artist	Nominated	

== BBC Sound of... ==
Sound of... is an annual BBC poll of music critics and industry figures to find the most promising new music talent. Adele has received one award.

Year	Nominee / work	Award	Result	Ref.
2008	Adele	Sound of 2008	Won	

== BBC Music Awards ==
The BBC Music Awards are the BBC's inaugural pop music awards, first held in December 2014, as a celebration of the musical achievements over the past 12 months. Adele has won four awards from five nominations.

Year	Nominee / work	Award	Result	Ref.
2015	Adele	British Artist of the Year	Won	
2015	Adele at the BBC	BBC Live Performance of the Year	Won	
2016	25	BBC Radio 2 Album of the Year	Won	
2016	"Hello"	BBC Song of the Year	Won	
2016	Adele	British Artist of the Year	Nominated	

== BBC Radio 1 Teen Awards ==
The BBC Radio 1 Teen Awards is an award show by the British radio station BBC Radio 1 to honor the top artists in music and acting of the year. Adele has won one award.

Year	Nominee / work	Award	Result	Ref.
2016	Adele	Best British Solo Artist	Won	

== BET Awards ==
The BET Awards were established in 2001 by the Black Entertainment Television network to celebrate African Americans and other minorities in music, acting, sports, and other fields of entertainment. Adele has been nominated once.

Year	Nominee / work	Award	Result	Ref.
2016	Adele	Best Female R&B/Pop Artist	Nominated	

== Billboard Music Awards ==
The Billboard Music Awards are held to honour artists for commercial performance in the U.S., based on record charts published by Billboard. In 2012, Adele won a record-breaking 12 awards for the night. Adele has won 18 awards from 40 nominations.

Year	Nominee / work	Award	Result	Ref.
2012	Adele	Top Artist	Won	
2012	Adele	Top Female Artist	Won	
2012	Adele	Top Billboard 200 Artist	Won	
2012	Adele	Top Hot 100 Artist	Won	
2012	Adele	Top Radio Songs Artist	Won	
2012	Adele	Top Digital Songs Artist	Won	
2012	Adele	Top Digital Media Artist	Won	
2012	Adele	Top Pop Artist	Won	
2012	"Rolling in the Deep"	Top Hot 100 Song	Nominated	
2012	"Rolling in the Deep"	Top Radio Song	Nominated	
2012	"Rolling in the Deep"	Top Rock Song	Nominated	
2012	"Rolling in the Deep"	Top Streaming Song (Audio)	Won	
2012	"Rolling in the Deep"	Top Alternative Song	Won	
2012	"Rolling in the Deep"	Top Digital Song	Nominated	
2012	"Rolling in the Deep"	Top Pop Song	Nominated	
2012	21	Top Billboard 200 Album	Won	
2012	21	Top Pop Album	Won	
2012	19	Top Pop Album	Nominated	
2012	"Someone like You"	Top Streaming Song (Video)	Nominated	
2012	"Someone like You"	Top Rock Song	Nominated	
2013	Adele	Top Billboard 200 Artist	Nominated	
2013	Adele	Top Female Artist	Nominated	
2013	Adele	Top Pop Artist	Nominated	
2013	21	Top Billboard 200 Album	Nominated	
2013	21	Top Pop Album	Won	
2016	Adele	Top Artist	Won	
2016	Adele	Top Female Artist	Won	
2016	Adele	Top Billboard 200 Artist	Won	
2016	Adele	Top Song Sales Artist	Nominated	
2016	Adele	Billboard Chart Achievement	Nominated	
2016	25	Top Billboard 200 Album	Won	
2016	"Hello"	Top Hot 100 Song	Nominated	
2016	"Hello"	Top Selling Song	Won	
2016	"Hello"	Top Radio Song	Nominated	
2017	Adele	Top Artist	Nominated	
2017	Adele	Top Female Artist	Nominated	
2022	30	Top Billboard 200 Album	Nominated	
2022	Adele	Top Billboard 200 Artist	Nominated	
2022	Adele	Top Female Artist	Nominated	
2022	Adele	Top Song Sales Artist	Nominated	

== Billboard Touring Awards ==
The Billboard Touring Awards is an annual meeting sponsored by Billboard magazine which also honors the top international live entertainment industry artists and professionals.

Year	Nominee / work	Award	Result	Ref.
2016	Adele	Breakthrough	Won	

== BMI Awards ==
The BMI Awards are held annually by Broadcast Music, Inc. to award songwriters in various genres, including pop music. Adele has received one BMI Film & TV Award, 10 BMI London Awards, and 4 BMI Pop Awards.

=== BMI Film & TV Awards ===
Year	Nominee / work	Award	Result	Ref.
2013	"Skyfall"	Academy Award Winners	Won	

=== BMI London Awards ===
Year	Nominee / work	Award	Result	Ref.
2009	"Chasing Pavements"	Award-Winning Songs	Won	
2012	"Rolling in the Deep"	Award-Winning Songs	Won	
2012	"Rolling in the Deep"	Song of the Year	Won	
2012	"Someone like You"	Award-Winning Songs	Won	
2012	"Set Fire to the Rain"	Award-Winning Songs	Won	
2013	"Skyfall"	Academy Award	Won	
2013	"Skyfall"	Pop Song Awards	Won	
2013	"Rumour Has It"	Pop Song Awards	Won	
2016	"Hello"	Pop Song Awards	Won	
2016	"Rolling in the Deep"	Million Performance Songs (4 Million)	Won	

=== BMI Pop Awards ===
Year	Nominee / work	Award	Result	Ref.
2012	"Rolling in the Deep"	Award-Winning Songs	Won	
2013	"Rumour Has It"	Award-Winning Songs	Won	
2013	"Someone like You"	Award-Winning Songs	Won	
2013	"Set Fire to the Rain"	Award-Winning Songs	Won	

== Bravo Otto ==
Established in 1957, the Bravo Otto is a German accolade presented by the magazine Bravo. The award is presented in gold, silver and bronze and, since 1996, an honorary platinum statuette presented for lifetime achievement. Adele has received one award.

Year	Nominee / work	Award	Result	Ref.
2011	Adele	Super Singer Female (silver)	Won	

== British Academy Television Awards ==
The British Academy Television Awards are presented in an annual award show hosted by the British Academy of Film and Television Arts (BAFTA).They have been awarded annually since 1955. Adele has been nominated 3 times.

Year	Nominee / work	Award	Result	Ref.
2016	Adele at the BBC	Best Entertainment Programme	Nominated	
2022	An Audience with Adele (ITV)	Best Entertainment Programme	Nominated	
2022	An Audience with Adele (ITV)	Must-See Moment ("Adele is surprised by the teacher who changed her life")	Nominated	

== Brit Awards ==
The Brit Awards are the British Phonographic Industry's (BPI) annual pop music awards. Adele has received 12 awards from 19 nominations.

Year	Nominee / work	Award	Result	Ref.
2008	Adele	Critics' Choice	Won	
2009	Adele	British Breakthrough Act	Nominated	
2009	Adele	British Female Solo Artist	Nominated	
2009	"Chasing Pavements"	British Single of the Year	Nominated	
2012	Adele	British Female Solo Artist	Won	
2012	21	British Album of the Year	Won	
2012	"Someone like You"	British Single of the Year	Nominated	
2013	"Skyfall"	British Single of the Year	Won	
2016	Adele	British Female Solo Artist	Won	
2016	Adele	Global Success Award	Won	
2016	25	British Album of the Year	Won	
2016	"Hello"	British Single of the Year	Won	
2016	"Hello"	British Video of the Year	Nominated	
2017	Adele	Global Success Award	Won	
2017	"Send My Love (To Your New Lover)"	British Video of the Year	Nominated	
2022	Adele	Artist of the Year	Won	
2022	Adele	British Pop/R&B Act	Nominated	
2022	30	British Album of the Year	Won	
2022	"Easy on Me"	British Single of the Year	Won	

== British LGBT Awards ==
The British LGBT Awards celebrate the UK's most loved LGBT personalities, innovators and companies. Adele has received one nomination.

Year	Nominee / work	Award	Result	Ref.
2016	Adele	Music Artist	Nominated	

== BT Digital Music Awards ==
Launched in 2002, the BT Digital Music Awards were held annually in the United Kingdom. Adele has won one award from six nominations.

Year	Nominee / work	Award	Result	Ref.
2011	Adele	Best Female Artist	Nominated	
2011	Adele	Best Independent Artist or Group	Won	
2011	"Make You Feel My Love"	Best Song	Nominated	
2011	"Someone like You"	Best Song	Nominated	
2011	"Rolling in the Deep"	Best Song	Nominated	
2011	"Rolling in the Deep"	Best Video	Nominated	

== CMT Music Awards ==
Launched in 1967, the CMT Music Awards are held annually in Nashville, Tennessee. Adele has been nominated once.

Year	Nominee / work	Award	Result	Ref.
2011	"Need You Now" (with Darius Rucker)	CMT Performance of the Year	Nominated	

== Critics' Choice Movie Awards ==
The Critics' Choice Movie Awards are presented annually since 1995 by the Broadcast Film Critics Association for outstanding achievements in the cinema industry. Adele has received one award.

Year	Nominee / work	Award	Result	Ref.
2013	"Skyfall"	Best Song	Won	

== Circle Chart Music Awards ==
Year	Nominee / work	Award	Result	Ref.
2015	"Hello"	Song of the Year in Int'l Pop	Won	

== Danish Music Awards ==
The Danish Music Awards (DMA) is a Danish award show. The show has been arranged by IFPI since 1989 and was originally called IFPI-prisen ("IFPI-Award") until 1991 when it changed its name to Dansk Grammy ("Danish Grammy"). The current name was given in 2001, after the American Grammy Awards registered the name Grammy as their trademark. In 2011 IFPI joined with TV2 (Denmark) and KODA to present the awards ceremony. Adele has won one award from four nominations.

Year	Nominee / work	Award	Result	Ref.
2011	21	International Album of the Year	Won	
2016	25	International Album of the Year	Nominated	
2016	"Hello"	International Hit of the Year	Nominated	
2022	30	International Album of the Year	Won	

== ECHO Music Awards ==
The ECHO Music Awards were organised in 1992 by German Phonoakademie, the cultural institute of the German Music Industry Association (BVMI), to recognise "outstanding and successful works of national and international music artists". Adele has won three awards from five nominations.

Year	Nominee / work	Award	Result	Ref.
2012	Adele	Best International Rock/Pop Female Artist	Won	
2012	21	Album of the Year	Won	
2016	Adele	Best International Rock/Pop Female Artist	Won	
2016	25	Album of the Year	Nominated	
2016	"Hello"	Hit of the Year	Nominated	

== Edinburgh TV Awards ==
The Edinburgh International Television Festival also known as the Edinburgh International Television Festival brought to you by YouTube and BT through sponsorship rights, is an annual media event in the UK each August that brings together all parts of the television and digital world to debate the major issues facing the industry. Adele has received one award.

Year	Nominee / work	Award	Result	Ref.
2016	Adele – Rapping to Nicki Minaj's verse on Monster	TV Moment of The Year	Won	

== Emmy Awards ==
=== Daytime Emmy Awards ===
The Daytime Emmy Award is an American accolade bestowed by the New York City–based National Academy of Television Arts and Sciences in recognition of excellence in American daytime television programming. Adele has been nominated once.

Year	Nominee / work	Award	Result	Ref.
2016	Adele in Today Show (NBC) for "Million Years Ago"	Outstanding Musical Performance in a Talk Show/Morning Program	Nominated	

=== Primetime Emmy Awards ===
The Primetime Emmy Award is an American accolade bestowed by the Academy of Television Arts & Sciences in recognition of excellence in American primetime television programming. Adele has won one award from two nominations.

Year	Nominee / work	Award	Result	Ref.
2016	Adele Live in New York City (NBC)	Outstanding Variety Special	Nominated	
2022	Adele One Night Only (CBS)	Outstanding Variety Special (Pre-Recorded)	Won	

== European Border Breakers Awards ==
The European Border Breakers Awards (EBBA) were established in 2004 by the European Commission and several companies and organisations within the European music business. Awards are presented to musicians and bands with the best selling debut albums in the European Union, not counting their home country. Adele has received one award.

Year	Nominee / work	Award	Result	Ref.
2009	19	Best Album	Won	

== Fryderyk ==
The Fryderyk is the annual award in Polish music. Officially created in 1994, awards are presented across three main sections – popular music, classical music, and jazz. Adele has received one award.

Year	Nominee / work	Award	Result	Ref.
2012	21	International Album	Won	

== GAFFA Awards ==
=== GAFFA Awards (Denmark) ===
Delivered since 1991, the GAFFA Awards (Danish: GAFFA Prisen) are a Danish award that rewards popular music by the magazine of the same name. Adele has won six awards from eight nominations.

Year	Nominee / work	Award	Result	Ref.
2011	Adele	Best Foreign Female Act	Won	
2011	21	Best Foreign Album	Won	
2011	"Someone Like You"	Best Foreign Song	Won	
2015	Adele	Best Foreign Female Act	Won	
2015	25	Best Foreign Album	Won	
2022	Adele	International Soloist of the Year	Won	
2022	30	International Album of the Year	Nominated	
2022	"Easy on Me"	International Hit of the Year	Nominated	

=== GAFFA Awards (Sweden) ===
Delivered since 2010, the GAFFA Awards (Swedish: GAFFA Priset) are a Swedish award that rewards popular music awarded by the magazine of the same name. Adele has received five awards.

Year	Nominee / work	Award	Result	Ref.
2011	Adele	Best Foreign Solo Act	Won	
2011	"Rolling in the Deep"	Best Foreign Song	Won	
2022	Adele	Foreign Solo Artist of the Year	Won	
2022	30	Foreign Album of the Year	Won	
2022	"Easy on Me"	Foreign Song of the Year	Won	

== Gaygalan Awards ==
Since 1999, the Gaygalan Awards are a Swedish accolade presented by the QX magazine. Adele has received two nominations.

Year	Nominee / work	Award	Result	Ref.
2012	"Someone Like You"	International Song of the Year	Nominated	
2022	"Easy on Me"	International Song of the Year	Nominated	

== Glamour Women of the Year Awards ==
The Glamour Awards are presented annually by the Glamour magazine to women in a variety of fields. Adele has received two awards.

Year	Nominee / work	Award	Result	Ref.
2009	Adele	UK Solo Artist of the Year	Won	
2011	Adele	UK Solo Artist of the Year	Won	

== Global Awards ==
The Global Awards is an annual awards ceremony established by Global Media & Entertainment. It brings together all of its radio stations to award the most recognised singers and bands in different categories. Adele has been nominated three times.

Year	Nominee / work	Award	Result	Ref.
2022	Adele	Best Female	Nominated	
2022	Adele	Best British Act	Nominated	
2022	Adele	Best Mass Appeal Artist	Nominated	

== Golden Globe Awards ==
The Golden Globe Award is an accolade bestowed by the 93 members of the Hollywood Foreign Press Association (HFPA) recognising excellence in film and television, both domestic and foreign. Adele has received one award.

Year	Nominee / work	Award	Result	Ref.
2013	"Skyfall"	Best Original Song – Motion Picture	Won	

== Grammis Awards ==
The Grammis Awards are the Swedish equivalent of the Grammy Awards, the awards were established in 1969. Adele has received one award.

Year	Nominee / work	Award	Result	Ref.
2012	21	Best International Album	Won	

== Grammy Awards ==
The Grammy Awards are awarded annually by The Recording Academy of the United States for outstanding achievements in the music industry. Often considered the highest music honour, the awards were established in 1958. In 2012, Adele became the second female artist to win six awards in one night. Adele was the second of three artists and first female, preceded by Christopher Cross & followed by Billie Eilish, to have won all four of the general field (Album of the Year, Best New Artist, Record of the Year and Song of the Year) awards throughout her career. In 2017, she became the only artist to, on two separate occasions, win the three general categories (Album of the Year, Record of the Year and Song of the Year) in the same ceremony. Adele has received 16 awards from 25 nominations.

Year	Nominee / work	Award	Result	Ref.
2009	"Chasing Pavements"	Record of the Year	Nominated	
2009	"Chasing Pavements"	Song of the Year	Nominated	
2009	"Chasing Pavements"	Best Female Pop Vocal Performance	Won	
2009	Adele	Best New Artist	Won	
2010	"Hometown Glory"	Best Female Pop Vocal Performance	Nominated	
2012	"Rolling in the Deep"	Record of the Year	Won	
2012	"Rolling in the Deep"	Song of the Year	Won	
2012	"Rolling in the Deep"	Best Short Form Music Video	Won	
2012	21	Album of the Year	Won	
2012	21	Best Pop Vocal Album	Won	
2012	"Someone like You"	Best Pop Solo Performance	Won	
2013	"Set Fire to the Rain" (live version from Live at the Royal Albert Hall)	Best Pop Solo Performance	Won	
2014	"Skyfall" (from Skyfall)	Best Song Written for Visual Media	Won	
2017	"Hello"	Record of the Year	Won	
2017	"Hello"	Song of the Year	Won	
2017	"Hello"	Best Pop Solo Performance	Won	
2017	25	Album of the Year	Won	
2017	25	Best Pop Vocal Album	Won	
2023	"Easy on Me"	Record of the Year	Nominated	
2023	"Easy on Me"	Song of the Year	Nominated	
2023	"Easy on Me"	Best Pop Solo Performance	Won	
2023	"Easy on Me"	Best Music Video	Nominated	
2023	30	Album of the Year	Nominated	
2023	30	Best Pop Vocal Album	Nominated	
2023	Adele One Night Only	Best Music Film	Nominated	

== Guinness World Records ==
The Guinness World Records is a reference book published annually, listing world records and national records, both of human achievements and the extremes of the natural world. Adele currently holds 18 world records.

Year	Nominee / work	Award	Result	Ref.
2011	Adele	First female to have two singles and two albums in the UK top 5 simultaneously	Won	
2011	Adele	First British artist to sell one million digital copies of a single in UK	Won	
2012	21	First album in UK chart history to reach sales of three million in a calendar year	Won	
2012	21	Most consecutive weeks with UK No.1 album by a solo female (11)	Won	
2012	21	Most cumulative weeks with UK No.1 album by a solo female (18)	Won	
2012	21	Biggest-selling digital album in the UK	Won	
2012	21	Biggest-selling digital album in the US	Won	
2012	"Rolling in the Deep"	Biggest-selling digital track in a calendar year in the US	Won	
2012	Adele	First female artist to reach digital sales of one million in the US	Won	
2012	Adele	First UK artist to reach digital sales of one million in the US	Won	
2012	Adele	Fastest artist to reach digital sales of one million in the US	Won	
2012	Adele	Most Grammy Awards won in a single year by a female artist	Won	
2015	25	Fastest-selling album worldwide by equivalent album units (5.7M)	Won	
2016	"Hello"	Fastest time for a video to reach one billion views on YouTube	Won	
2021	30	Biggest-selling album worldwide	Won	
2021	"Easy on Me"	Most streamed song in a single day on Spotify	Won	
2022	Adele	Most Brit awards won for Album of the Year by a solo artist	Won	
2022	Adele	Most Brit Awards won for Best British Single by a solo artist	Won	
2022	Adele	Most Brit Awards won by a female artist	Won	

== Helpmann Awards ==
The Helpmann Awards recognise distinguished artistic achievement and excellence in Australia's live performing arts sectors. Adele has received one nomination.

Year	Nominee / work	Award	Result	Ref.
2017	Adele	Best International Contemporary Concert	Nominated	

== Houston Film Critics Society ==
The Houston Film Critics Society is a non-profit film critic organised in Houston, Texas. Adele has received one award.

Year	Nominee / work	Award	Result	Ref.
2013	"Skyfall"	Best Original Song	Won	

== IFPI Global Recording Artist Award ==
The IFPI Global Recording Artist of the Year Award honors the year's top artist across physical sales, downloads and streaming worldwide. Adele has received one award.

Year	Nominee / work	Award	Result	Ref.
2016	Adele	Global Recording Artist of 2015	Won	

== iHeartRadio Music Awards ==
iHeartRadio Music Awards is a music awards show, founded by iHeartRadio in 2014, to recognise the most popular artists and music over the past year as determined by the network's listeners. Adele has received 5 awards out of 12 nominations.

Year	Nominee / work	Award	Result	Ref.
2016	Adele	Female Artist of the Year	Nominated	
2016	Adele	Most Meme-able Moment	Nominated	
2016	"Hello"	Song of the Year	Won	
2016	"Hello"	Best Lyrics	Nominated	
2016	25	Album of the Year	Nominated	
2017	Adele	Female Artist of the Year	Won	
2017	25	Pop Album of the Year	Won	
2017	"Send My Love (To Your New Lover)"	Best Lyrics	Nominated	
2022	30	Best Comeback Album	Won	
2022	30	Album of the Year - Pop	Won	
2022	"Easy on Me"	Song of the Year	Nominated	
2022	"Easy on Me"	Best Lyrics	Nominated	

== iHeartRadio Titanium Awards ==
iHeartRadio Titanium Awards are awarded to an artist when their song reaches 1 Billion Spins across iHeartRadio Stations.

Year	Nominee/Work		Ref
2022	"Easy On Me"	1 Billion Total Audience Spins on iHeartRadio Stations	

== Independent Music Companies Association ==
The Independent Music Companies Association is selected annually by the IMPALA Independent Music Companies Association based on artistic merit alone, regardless of sales figures and publicity, from a nomination shortlist from which a jury then selects a winner. Adele has received one award.

Year	Nominee / work	Award	Result	Ref.
2011	21	European Independent Album of the Year	Won	

== Ivor Novello Awards ==
The Ivor Novello Awards are awarded for songwriting and composing. The awards, named after the Cardiff born entertainer Ivor Novello, are presented annually in London by the British Academy of Songwriters, Composers and Authors (BASCA). Adele has won 3 awards from 9 nominations.

Year	Nominee / work	Award	Result	Ref.
2012	Adele	Songwriter of the Year	Won	
2012	"Rolling in the Deep"	PRS for Music Most Performed Work	Won	
2012	"Rolling in the Deep"	Best Song Musically and Lyrically	Nominated	
2012	"Someone like You"	PRS for Music Most Performed Work	Nominated	
2012	21	Album of the Year	Nominated	
2016	Adele	Songwriter of the Year	Won	
2017	"When We Were Young"	PRS for Music Most Performed Work	Nominated	
2022	"Easy on Me"	Best Song Musically and Lyrically	Nominated	
2022	Adele	Songwriter of the Year	Nominated	

== Juno Awards ==
The Juno Awards are presented annually to Canadian musical artists and bands to acknowledge their artistic and technical achievements in all aspects of music. New members of the Canadian Music Hall of Fame are also inducted as part of the awards ceremonies. Adele has received 2 awards from 3 nominations.

Year	Nominee / work	Award	Result	Ref.
2012	21	International Album of the Year	Won	
2016	25	International Album of the Year	Won	
2022	30	International Album of the Year	Nominated	

== Latin American Music Awards ==
The Latin American Music Awards (Latin AMAs) is an annual American music award that is presented by Telemundo. It is the Spanish-language counterpart of the American Music Awards (AMAs) produced by the Dick Clark Productions. Adele has received 1 nomination.

Year	Nominee / work	Award	Result	Ref.
2016	"Hello"	Favorite Song – Crossover	Nominated	

== Los 40 Music Awards ==
Los 40 Music Awards, known as Los Premios 40 Principales before 2016, is an award show by the musical radio station Los 40, created in 2006 to celebrate the fortieth anniversary of its founding. Adele has won 1 award from 8 nominations.

Year	Nominee / work	Award	Result	Ref.
2012	"Someone like You"	Best International Song	Won	
2016	Adele	Best International Artist	Nominated	
2016	25	International Album of the Year	Nominated	
2016	"Hello"	International Song of the Year	Nominated	
2016	Adele Live 2016	Tour of the Year	Nominated	
2022	30	Best International Album	Nominated	
2022	"Easy on Me"	Best International Song	Nominated	
2022	"Oh My God"	Best International Video	Nominated	

== Mercury Prize ==
The Mercury Prize, formerly the Mercury Music Prize, is an annual music prize awarded for the best album from the United Kingdom or Ireland. Adele has been nominated twice, without a win.

Year	Nominee / work	Award	Result	Ref.
2008	19	Album of the Year	Nominated	
2011	21	Album of the Year	Nominated	

== MOBO Awards ==
The Music of Black Origin Awards (MOBO), first presented in 1996, are held annually in the United Kingdom to recognise artists of any race or nationality who perform black music and "recognise the outstanding achievements of artists who perform music in genres ranging from Gospel, Jazz, RnB, Soul, Reggae to Hip Hop". Adele has received 1 award from 5 nominations.

Year	Nominee / work	Award	Result	Ref.
2008	Adele	Best UK Female	Nominated	
2011	Adele	Best UK Act	Nominated	
2011	Adele	Best UK R&B/Soul Act	Won	
2011	21	Best Album	Nominated	
2011	"Someone like You"	Best Song	Nominated	

== MuchMusic Video Awards ==
The MuchMusic Video Awards (also known as the MMVA or MMVAs) are annual awards presented by the Canadian music video channel MuchMusic to honour the year's best music videos. Adele has 4 nominations.

Year	Nominee / work	Award	Result	Ref.
2012	Adele	UR Fave Artist	Nominated	
2016	Adele	iHeartRadio International Artist of the Year	Nominated	
2016	Adele	Most Buzzworthy International Artist of the Year	Nominated	
2016	Adele	Fan Fave Artist/Group	Nominated	

== Music Business Association ==
The Music Business Association, (Music Biz) a non-profit membership organization established in 1958, advances and promotes music commerce. Adele has received one honour.

Year	Nominee / work	Award	Result	Ref.
2017	Adele	Artist of the Year	Won	

== MTV ==
=== MTV Africa Music Awards ===
The MTV Africa Music Awards (MAMAs) were established in 2008 by the African units of Paramount Networks EMEAA (at the time known as MTV Networks Africa) to celebrate the most popular contemporary music in Africa. Adele has been nominated once.

Year	Nominee / work	Award	Result	Ref.
2016	Adele	Best International Act	Nominated	

=== MTV Italy Awards ===
The MTV Italian Music Awards, also known as the MTV Awards, were established in 2006 by MTV Italy, to celebrate the most popular videos and artists in Italy. Adele has received 3 nominations.

Year	Nominee / work	Award	Result	Ref.
2012	Adele	Wonder Woman Award	Nominated	
2016	Adele	Best International Female	Nominated	
2016	"Hello"	Best Tormentone (catchphrase)	Nominated	

=== MTV Europe Music Awards ===
The MTV Europe Music Awards were established in 1994 by MTV Networks Europe to celebrate the most popular music videos in Europe. Adele has received one award from thirteen nominations.

Year	Nominee / work	Award	Result	Ref.
2008	Adele	Best UK & Ireland Act	Nominated	
2011	Adele	Best UK & Ireland Act	Won	
2011	Adele	Best European Act	Nominated	
2011	Adele	Best Female	Nominated	
2011	"Rolling in the Deep"	Best Song	Nominated	
2011	"Rolling in the Deep"	Best Video	Nominated	
2016	Adele	Best Female	Nominated	
2016	Adele	Best Live Act	Nominated	
2016	Adele	Best UK & Ireland Act	Nominated	
2016	"Hello"	Best Song	Nominated	
2022	Adele	Best Artist	Nominated	
2022	Adele	Best UK & Ireland Act	Nominated	
2024	Adele	Best Live	Nominated	

=== MTV Video Music Awards ===
The MTV Video Music Awards were established in the end of the summer of 1984 by MTV to celebrate the top music videos of the year. Adele has received three awards from seventeen nominations.

Year	Nominee / work	Award	Result	Ref.
2008	"Chasing Pavements"	Best Choreography	Nominated	
2011	"Rolling in the Deep"	Video of the Year	Nominated	
2011	"Rolling in the Deep"	Best Female Video	Nominated	
2011	"Rolling in the Deep"	Best Pop Video	Nominated	
2011	"Rolling in the Deep"	Best Direction	Nominated	
2011	"Rolling in the Deep"	Best Art Direction	Won	
2011	"Rolling in the Deep"	Best Cinematography	Won	
2011	"Rolling in the Deep"	Best Editing	Won	
2012	"Someone like You"	Best Cinematography	Nominated	
2016	"Hello"	Video of the Year	Nominated	
2016	"Hello"	Best Female Video	Nominated	
2016	"Hello"	Best Pop Video	Nominated	
2016	"Hello"	Best Direction	Nominated	
2016	"Hello"	Best Art Direction	Nominated	
2016	"Hello"	Best Cinematography	Nominated	
2016	"Hello"	Best Editing	Nominated	
2016	"Send My Love (To Your New Lover)"	Best Visual Effects	Nominated	
2022	"Easy on Me"	Song of the Year	Nominated	
2022	"Oh My God"	Best Art Direction	Nominated	
2022	30	Album of the Year	Nominated	
2023	"I Drink Wine"	Best Cinematography	Nominated	

=== MTV Video Music Brazil ===
Established in 1995, the MTV Video Music Brazil awards, commonly known as VMB, are MTV Brasil's annual award ceremony. Many award winners are chosen by MTV viewers. Adele has been nominated once.

Year	Nominee / work	Award	Result	Ref.
2011	Adele	Best International Act	Nominated	

=== MTV Video Music Awards Japan ===
The MTV Video Music Awards Japan are the Japanese version of the MTV Video Music Awards. Like the MTV Video Music Awards in the United States, in this event artists are awarded for their songs and videos through online voting from the same channel viewers. Adele has been nominated twice.

Year	Nominee / work	Award	Result	Ref.
2016	"Hello"	Best International Female Video	Nominated	
2016	25	Album of the Year	Nominated	

=== mtvU Woodie Awards ===
mtvU, a division of MTV Networks owned by Viacom, broadcasts a 24-hour television channel available on more than 750 college and university campuses across the United States. Adele has been nominated once.

Year	Nominee / work	Award	Result	Ref.
2008	"Chasing Pavements"	Best Video Woodie (Best Video of the Year)	Nominated	

== NAACP Image Awards ==
An NAACP Image Award is an accolade presented by the National Association for the Advancement of Colored People to honour outstanding people of colour in film, television, music, and literature. Adele has been nominated twice.

Year	Nominee / work	Award	Result	Ref.
2012	"Someone like You"	Outstanding Song	Nominated	
2012	"Someone like You"	Outstanding Music Video	Nominated	

== New Music Awards ==
The New Music Awards is an annual awards ceremony established in 2003 by New Music Weekly, honouring the achievements of established and independent artists, radio stations, record labels, and public relations. Adele has received one award.

Year	Nominee / work	Award	Result	Ref.
2022	Easy On Me	Top 40/CHR Song of the Year	Won	

== Nickelodeon Kids' Choice Awards ==
The Nickelodeon Kids' Choice Awards is an annual awards show that airs on the Nickelodeon cable channel that honours the year's biggest television, film, and music acts, as voted by Nickelodeon viewers. Adele has won two awards from nine nominations.

Year	Nominee / work	Award	Result	Ref.
2013	Adele	Favorite Female Singer	Nominated	
2016	Adele	Favorite Female Singer	Nominated	
2016	"Hello"	Favorite Song of the Year	Won	
2017	Adele	Favorite Female Singer	Nominated	
2017	"Send My Love (To Your New Lover)"	Favorite Song	Nominated	
2022	Adele	Favorite Female Artist	Nominated	
2022	Adele	Favorite Global Music Star	Won	
2022	"Easy on Me"	Favorite Song	Nominated	
2022	30	Favorite Album	Nominated	

== Nickelodeon United Kingdom Kids' Choice Awards ==
The Nickelodeon UK Kids' Choice Awards (also known as the KCAs) is an annual awards show, similar to the American and Australian versions. Adele has won two awards from two nominations.

Year	Nominee / work	Award	Result	Ref.
2012	Adele	Best UK Female	Won	
2013	Adele	Best UK Female	Won	

== NME Awards ==
The NME Awards were created by the NME magazine and was first held in 1953. Adele has received one award from seven nominations.

Year	Nominee / work	Award	Result	Ref.
2012	Adele	Best Solo Artist	Nominated	
2016	Adele	Best British Solo Artist	Nominated	
2016	Adele	Hero of the Year	Nominated	
2016	The Return of Adele	Music Moment of the Year	Nominated	
2017	Adele	Best British Female	Nominated	
2017	Adele	Best Festival Headliner	Won	
2017	Adele	Hero of the Year	Nominated	

== NRJ Music Awards ==
The NRJ Music Awards, created in 2000 by the French radio station NRJ in partnership with the French television network TF1. Adele has received three awards from four nominations.

Year	Nominee / work	Award	Result	Ref.
2012	Adele	International Breakthrough of the Year	Won	
2012	"Someone like You"	International Song of the Year	Won	
2013	Adele	International Female Artist of the Year	Nominated	
2015	Adele	NRJ Artist of Honor	Won	

== People's Choice Awards ==
The People's Choice Awards is an American awards show recognising the people and the work of popular culture. The show has been held annually since 1975 and is voted on by the general public. Adele has won one award from twelve nominations.

Year	Nominee / work	Award	Result	Ref.
2012	Adele	Favorite Female Artist	Nominated	
2012	21	Favorite Album of the Year	Nominated	
2012	"Rolling in the Deep"	Favorite Song of the Year	Nominated	
2012	"Rolling in the Deep"	Favorite Music Video	Nominated	
2013	Adele	Favorite Female Artist	Nominated	
2013	Adele	Favorite Pop Artist	Nominated	
2017	Adele	Favorite Female Artist	Nominated	
2017	Adele	Favorite Pop Artist	Nominated	
2017	James Corden's Carpool Karaoke with Adele	Favorite Comedic Collaboration	Nominated	
2021	Adele	Favorite Female Artist	Won	
2021	"Easy on Me"	Favorite Song of the Year	Nominated	
2021	"Easy on Me"	Favorite Music Video	Nominated	

== Pollstar Awards ==
Pollstar is a trade publication for the concert tour industry. It gets its information primarily from the agents, managers and promoters who produce concerts. Pollstar holds an annual award ceremony to honor artists and professionals in the concert industry. Adele has received two award from four nominations..

Year	Nominee / work	Award	Result	Ref.
2012	Adele	Best New Touring Artist	Won	
2016	Adele	Major Tour of the Year	Won	
2016	Adele	Most Creative Stage Production	Nominated	
2022	Adele, The Colosseum at Caesars Palace, Las Vegas	Residency of the Year	Nominated	
2023	Adele, The Colosseum at Caesars Palace	Residency of the Year	Nominated	
2024	Adele, The Colosseum at Caesars Palace/Neue Messe München	Residency of the Year	Nominated	

== Premios Juventud ==
Premios Juventud (Youthfulness Awards) is an awards show for Spanish-speaking celebrities in the areas of film, music, sports, fashion, and pop culture, presented by the television network Univision. Winners are determined by online vote at univision.com. Adele has won twice out of three nominations.

Year	Nominee / work	Award	Result	Ref.
2013	Adele	Favorite Hitmaker	Nominated	
2016	Adele	Favorite Hitmaker	Won	
2016	"Hello"	Favorite Hit	Won	

== Premios Odeón ==
The Premios Odeón Awards are a series of awards given annually by the Asociación de Gestión de Derechos Intelectuales (AGEDI) to honour the achievements of Spanish music. Adele has won one award from two nominations.

Year	Nominee / work	Award	Result	Ref.
2022	30	Best International Album	Nominated	
2022	Adele	Odeon International Artist	Won	

== Premios Oye! ==
Premios Oye! are presented annually by the Academia Nacional de la Música en México for outstanding achievements in Mexican record industry. Adele has won two awards.

Year	Nominee / work	Award	Result	Ref.
2012	21	Álbum en inglés	Won	
2013	Live at the Royal Albert Hall	Álbum en inglés	Won	

== Q Awards ==
The Q Awards are the United Kingdom's annual music awards run by the music magazine Q to honour musical excellence. Winners are voted by readers of Q online, with others decided by a judging panel. Adele has received two awards from six nominations.

Year	Nominee / work	Award	Result	Ref.
2008	Adele	Breakthrough Artist	Nominated	
2011	Adele	Best Female Artist	Won	
2011	"Rolling in the Deep"	Best Track	Won	
2011	"Someone like You"	Best Track	Nominated	
2012	Adele	Best Solo Artist	Nominated	
2017	Adele	Best Act In The World	Nominated	

== Radio Disney Music Awards ==
The Radio Disney Music Awards (RDMA) is an annual awards show which is operated and governed by Radio Disney, an American radio network. Beginning in 2013, the ceremony began to be televised on Disney Channel. Adele has been nominated twice.

Year	Nominee / work	Award	Result	Ref.
2016	Adele	She's The One – Best Female Artist	Nominated	
2016	"Hello"	Heartbreak – Best Breakup Song	Nominated	

== Satellite Awards ==
The Satellite Awards are an annual award given by the International Press Academy. Adele has been nominated once.

Year	Nominee / work	Award	Result	Ref.
2012	"Skyfall"	Best Original Song	Nominated	

== Shorty Awards ==
The Shorty Awards honor the best of social media by recognizing the influencers, brands and organizations on social media. Adele has won once.

Year	Nominee / work	Award	Result	Ref.
2016	Adele	Arts & Entertainment: Musician	Won	

== Soul Train Music Awards ==
The Soul Train Music Awards are produced by the makers of Soul Train to honour entertainers. Adele has been nominated five times.

Year	Nominee / work	Award	Result	Ref.
2011	21	Album of the Year	Nominated	
2011	"Rolling in the Deep"	The Ashford & Simpson Songwriter's Award	Nominated	
2011	"Rolling in the Deep"	Song of the Year	Nominated	
2016	"Hello"	Song of the Year	Nominated	
2016	"Hello"	Ashford & Simpson Songwriter's Award	Nominated	

== South Bank Sky Arts Awards ==
The South Bank Show is a television arts magazine show that was produced by ITV between 1978 and 2010, and by Sky Arts from 2012. Adele has been nominated once.

Year	Nominee / work	Award	Result	Ref.
2012	Adele	Pop Music	Nominated	

== Space Shower Music Awards ==
The Space Shower Music Awards are an annual set of Japanese music awards sponsored by Space Shower TV.

Year	Nominee / work	Award	Result	Ref.
2016	Adele	Best International Artist.	Won	

== Swiss Music Awards ==
The Swiss Music Awards were established in 2008 and initially organised by IFPI to celebrate Swiss and international artists. Since 2022, it has been organised by CH Media. Adele has received four awards from four nominations.

Year	Nominee / work	Award	Result	Ref.
2012	"Rolling in the Deep"	Best International Hit	Won	
2012	21	Best International Pop/Rock Album	Won	
2016	Adele	Best International Act	Won	
2016	25	Best International Album	Won	

== Ticketmaster Awards ==
Year	Nominee / work	Award	Result	Ref.
2025	Adele	International Live Act of the Year (Germany)	Won	
2025	Adele in Munich	Event of the Year (Germany)	Won	

== Teen Choice Awards ==
The Teen Choice Awards is an annual awards show that airs on the Fox Network. The awards honour the year's biggest achievements in music, films, sports, television, fashion and other categories, voted by teenage viewers. Adele has been nominated six times.

Year	Nominee / work	Award	Result	Ref.
2011	Adele	Choice Breakout Artist	Nominated	
2011	Adele	Choice Music Female Artist	Nominated	
2011	"Rolling in the Deep"	Choice Break-Up Song	Nominated	
2012	Adele	Choice Music Female Artist	Nominated	
2012	"Set Fire to the Rain"	Choice Music Single – Female	Nominated	
2016	"Hello"	Choice Music Single – Female	Nominated	

== UK Music Video Awards ==
The UK Music Video Awards is an annual award ceremony founded in 2008 to recognise creativity, technical excellence and innovation in music videos and moving images for music. Adele has received two awards from seven nominations.

Year	Nominee / work	Award	Result	Ref.
2008	"Chasing Pavements"	General Video Categories − People's Choice Award	Nominated	
2011	"Rolling in the Deep"	Best Pop Video − UK	Won	
2011	"Rolling in the Deep"	Best Cinematography in a Video	Won	
2011	"Rolling in the Deep"	Best Art Direction and Design in a Video	Nominated	
2016	"Hello"	Best Pop Video − UK	Nominated	
2022	"Oh My God"	Best Pop Video − UK	Nominated	
2022	"Oh My God"	Best Production Design in a Video	Nominated	

== Urban Music Awards ==
The Urban Music Awards is a British awards ceremony launched in 2003 to recognise the achievement of urban-based artists, producers, nightclubs, DJs, radio stations, and record labels. Adele has received one award from four nominations.

Year	Nominee / work	Award	Result	Ref.
2008	Adele	Best Jazz Act	Won	
2008	Adele	Best Neo Soul Act	Nominated	
2011	Adele	Best Female Artist	Nominated	
2011	21	Best Album	Nominated	

== World Soundtrack Awards ==
The World Soundtrack Awards are presented by World Soundtrack Academy to honour accomplishment in film music. Adele has received one award.

Year	Nominee / work	Award	Result	Ref.
2013	"Skyfall"	Best Original Song Written Directly for a Film	Won	

== ZD Awards ==
Zvukovaya Dorozhka (Russian: Звуковая Дорожка, "sound track") is Russia's oldest hit parade in field of popular music. Since 2003 it is presented in a ceremony in concert halls. It's considered one of the major Russian music awards.

Year	Nominee / work	Award	Result	Ref.
2015	Herself	Best Foreign Act	Nominated	

== Žebřík Music Awards ==
Žebřík Music Awards is a music award given to the best musicians and bands in the Czech Republic. It has been awarded annually since 1992 and organized and presented by iReport, a music and style magazine.

Year	Nominee / work	Award	Result	Ref.
2022	Adele	Best Foreign Singer	Won	
2022	"Easy on Me"	Best Foreign Composition	Nominated	
2022	30	Best Foreign Album	Nominated	

== Other accolades ==
=== State honours ===
Key
‡	Indicates an honour Adele was considered for only

Name of country, year given, and name of honour
Country	Year	Honour	Ref.
United Kingdom	2013	Most Excellent Order of the British Empire	
United Kingdom	2018	Inducted into the Royal Albert Hall's Walk of Fame	
United States	2016	‡ 5 July, Minnesota (Adele Day)	
