= Steven M. Zeitels =

American surgeon

Steven Marc Zeitels
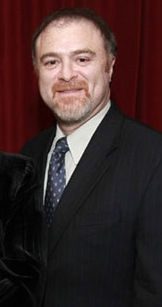
- Born: 7 November 1957 (age 68); New York City, New York, United States
- Known for: surgical innovation, voice procedures (phonosurgery), vocal cord cancer surgery
- Scientific career
- Institutions: Harvard Medical School & Massachusetts General Hospital

Steven Marc Zeitels (born November 7, 1957) is the Eugene B. Casey Professor of Laryngeal Surgery at Harvard Medical School and the Director of Massachusetts General Hospital (MGH) Center for Laryngeal Surgery and Voice Rehabilitation (MGH Voice Center).

== Career ==
Zeitels grew up in New Rochelle, New York. His father and mother, an orthodontist and elementary school teacher, pressed him to take up a career in medicine. At the age of 17, Zeitels was selected to be in the 1st class of Boston University Trustee Scholars, an experimental educational program for gifted teens as well as the Boston University's accelerated six-year medical program. He graduated from the BU School of Medicine in 1982. Knowing he wanted to be a surgeon, he completed the BU - Tufts combined Otolaryngology – Head and Neck Surgery Program in 1987 as well as a Head & Neck Surgical Oncology Fellowship at BU and the Boston Veterans Affairs Medical Center in 1988.

Zeitels along with Casey is known for his introduction of angiolytic laser treatment of vocal cord cancer. Zeitels has also designed procedures to restore the voice of those who have had vocal paresis and paralysis. Zeitels also performed an endoscopic removal of a tongue-base larynx cancer on Tom Hamilton, Aerosmith’s bass guitarist after radiation and chemotherapy failed to control his advanced throat cancer.

Zeitels removed precancerous dysplasia from Roger Daltrey's vocal fold just one month prior to his 2010 Super Bowl performance. In 2012, there was international coverage of Zeitels' microsurgery to restore Adele's voice; she thanked him in the acceptance of the first of her six Grammy Awards.

Larry Page, the founder of Google, described his difficulties with vocal nerve injury and has been a supporter of Zeitels and the Voice Health Institute. Zeitels conceived and directs the Voice Restoration Research Program, which is a collaborative effort of investigators at Harvard and MGH, as well as Robert Langer at MIT. They have spent over a decade developing a biomaterial that would restore the largest majority of human voice loss and the research group received the 2010 Broyles Maloney Award of the American Broncho-Esophagological Association for their effort. They hope to initiate human trials to test the new vocal biogel in 2018.

== Personal life ==
While in Chile lecturing as a guest of the Chilean Society of Otolaryngology in 2001 he met Maria Nuria Hananias, a Chilean otolaryngological surgeon. Married in 2003, they have two children, a boy and a girl.

== Recognition ==
- 2012 Fast Company’s 100 Most Creative People (14th)
- 2012 Rolling Stone’s 25 Best Things in Rock (13th)
