= Adele One Night Only =

2021 television special

- Promotional poster for the show
- Written by: Lauren Greenberg; David Young
- Directed by: Paul Dugdale
- Presented by: Oprah Winfrey
- Starring: Adele
- Original language: English

Production
- Executive producers: Ben Winston; Adele Adkins; Jonathan Dickins; Raj Kapoor; Tara Montgomery; Terry Wood
- Production location: Griffith Observatory
- Running time: 88 minutes
- Production companies: Fulwell 73; Onwards Productions; Harpo Productions

Original release
- Network: CBS
- Release: 14 November 2021

Adele One Night Only is a television special by English singer Adele. The 88-minute program aired on CBS, and simulcast on Paramount+, on 14 November 2021. It features Adele's performances of previously unreleased songs from her fourth studio album, 30 (2021), as well as material from her previous albums, interspersed with an interview with Oprah Winfrey.

The special drew favourable reviews from critics, who praised Adele's voice and performing skills and the choice of the Griffith Observatory as the venue, but some criticised the interview segment. It became the most-viewed entertainment special in the United States since Oprah with Meghan and Harry (2021). The special won five awards from five nominations at the 74th Primetime Creative Arts Emmy Awards, a Directors Guild of America Award, and it earned a nomination for the Grammy Award for Best Music Film at the 65th ceremony.

== Background ==
On 13 October 2021, Adele announced that her fourth studio album, 30, would be released on 19 November 2021. On the day following the announcement, "Easy on Me" was released as the lead single from the album. About the prospect of touring in support of 30, she stated: "This album? No, probably not. I'd love to. I was actually desperate to tour, which for me is wild because I don't like touring. [...] It doesn't sit right with me putting an album out this year and then touring it in 2023."

On 18 October, Adele announced that she would star in a television special for CBS, titled Adele One Night Only, which would be filmed during her show in Los Angeles on 14 November and broadcast live on Paramount+. It would feature an interview with Oprah Winfrey and the premiere of unreleased songs from the album. A trailer for the special was aired on 10 November, which featured her performing for an audience including Lizzo, Dwyane Wade, and Gabrielle Union. Adele described it: "It will look really elegant, then I'll tell a load of filthy jokes and stand-up. It will be real whip lash for 'em." Regarding her decision to be part of the special, Winfrey stated that "nobody's more compelling with truth than Adele" and went on to promise viewers a "very special night".

== Synopsis ==
The special was divided into two parts: a live concert filmed at the Griffith Observatory in Los Angeles and Adele's interview with Winfrey at the latter's home in Montecito, California. Afront a sunset and a view of the Hollywood Hills, Adele opened her show with a performance of "Hello" (2015). The camera frequently cut to celebrities in attendance, whom Adele described as "a mix of close friends and complete strangers". She was dressed in a long and tight-fitting black outfit and dangly earrings. Adele frequently engaged in banter and interacted with the audience, occasionally using profanity which was censored using a three-second delay. The show also included a male attendee proposing to his partner of seven years. Adele explained this to the audience and instructed them to be quiet, as the man walked the blindfolded woman to the front and tearfully proposed to her, after which Adele segued into a performance of "Make You Feel My Love". Adele also performed the then-unreleased tracks "I Drink Wine", "Hold On", and "Love Is a Game", along with the first performance of "Easy on Me".

The interview was filmed in a garden reminiscent of the one where Winfrey had interviewed Prince Harry, Duke of Sussex and Meghan, Duchess of Sussex earlier in the year. During this segment, Adele was asked about her upbringing, weight loss, as well as the current status of her love life. She was clad in a white pantsuit, which was originally a skirt suit that Adele asked to be altered. Vanessa Friedman of The New York Times, who thought a white pantsuit was "the single garment most associated with women's liberation and empowerment on the public stage", interpreted this outfit as a political message. Adele discussed her relationship with her estranged father, how it was important for her to heal her relationship with him before he died, the moment she knew her marriage was over, her relationship with Rich Paul, and other personal topics.

== Reception ==
=== Ratings ===
In the United States, the special drew 9.92 million viewers and a 1.5 rating in the adult age 18-49 demographic. Its Live+same day count added a viewership of 1.3 million, surpassing the 93rd Academy Awards in April 2021, and making it the most-viewed entertainment special since CBS's Oprah with Meghan and Harry (2021). The viewership for the special's global broadcasts included 2.004 million from Canada, 797.000 from the Netherlands, 747.000 from Australia, 738.000 from Spain, 568.000 from France, 140.387 from Hungary, and 20.000 from Switzerland.

=== Critical response ===
Adele One Night Only
Aggregate scores
Source	Rating
Metacritic	69/100
Review scores
Source	Rating
The Telegraph	3/5 stars

Adele One Night Only received rave reviews according to Variety's Cynthia Littleton. At Metacritic, which assigns a normalized rating out of 100 to reviews from mainstream critics, the special has an average score of 69 out of 100, which indicates "generally favorable reviews" based on five reviews. Caroline Framke of Variety believed that though the views of the observatory were stunning, their impact was greatly enhanced by Adele's vocal performance: "She reminded the world why she's become such an icon, in a purer sense of the word than corporate Twitter accounts now use it. No amount of talking through or around her trials or process could quite equal the emotional punch of a clear-eyed Adele simply singing about it all". Writing for Vulture, Jen Chaney thought it occupied a "rarefied air" due to its massive production value, but Adele's voice and performing ability powered through it and reminded listeners why they missed her. Mary Siroky of Consequence believed the event was "gorgeously staged", and she was positive about the performances: "From the first notes of 'Hello,' it became very clear: Adele is not here to play".

Los Angeles Times's Lorraine Ali described the interview as "uneventful and distinctly nonrevealing", but she was positive about the proposal during the show and thought Adele's interaction with her son onstage displayed the most vulnerability. Ed Power of The Telegraph shared a similar opinion, and wrote that she was "an enigma who refused to be unlocked" and held back during the interview, but he praised the performances and the observatory as the location of choice. Writing for The A.V. Club, Lily Moayeri believed the constant switching between the interview and performance demanded "too much of a mood swing from viewers", but she appreciated Adele's charisma and the musical segment.

== Set list ==
1. "Hello"
2. "Easy on Me"
3. "Skyfall"
4. "I Drink Wine"
5. "Someone Like You"
6. "When We Were Young"
7. "Make You Feel My Love"
8. "Hold On"
9. "Rolling in the Deep"
10. "Love Is a Game"

== Broadcasting ==
Original airing date of Adele One Night Only by country
Country	Broadcaster(s)	Première	Alternative name	Viewership	Ref(s)
United States	CBS	14 November 2021		11.700.000	
United States	Paramount+	14 November 2021		11.700.000	
Canada	Global	14 November 2021		2.004.000	
Australia	Seven Network	21 November 2021		747.000	
China	KuGou TME Live	21 November 2021			
Denmark	TV 2 Charlie	21 November 2021	Adele Live Fra Los Angeles		
Greece	Alpha TV	21 November 2021			
Hong Kong	Now Studio	21 November 2021			
Indonesia	Vidio	21 November 2021			
Philippines	Discovery+	21 November 2021			
Poland	Polsat Box Go	21 November 2021			
Singapore	meWATCH	21 November 2021			
Slovakia	TV Doma	21 November 2021			
Vietnam	Galaxy Play	21 November 2021			
New Zealand	TVNZ 2	22 November 2021			
Netherlands	NPO 3 (NTR)	23 November 2021		797.000	
Mexico	Canal 5	26 November 2021			
Norway	NRK1	26 November 2021	En Kveld Med Adele		
Belgium; Flanders	Eén	27 November 2021	Adele - One Night Only Met Oprah Winfrey		
Spain	La 1	27 November 2021	Una Noche Con Adele	738.000	
Switzerland	SRF zwei	28 November 2021		20.000	
South Korea	Wavve	30 November 2021	원데이 위드 아델		
South Korea	MBC TV	30 November 2021	원데이 위드 아델		
Belgium; Wallonia	Tipik	3 December 2021			
France	TMC	3 December 2021	One Night with Adele: Le Concert Événement	568.000	
Monaco	TMC	3 December 2021	One Night with Adele: Le Concert Événement		
Germany	Das Erste (MDR) (Note: MDR, the regional channel of ARD in Saxony, Saxony-Anhalt and Thuringia, broadcast the show on its own channel on 18 December 2021.)	4 December 2021	Ein Abend mit Adele		
Hungary	RTL Klub	4 December 2021	Adele - Az Interjú	140.387	
Philippines	Myx	4 December 2021			
Russia	Channel One	18 December 2021	Вечер с Адель		
Portugal	RTP2	18 December 2021	Adele - Uma Noite Única		
India	SonyLIV	24 December 2021			
Faroe Islands	KvF	6 August 2022	Adele Live úr Los Angeles		

== Awards and nominations ==
List of awards, showing date of ceremony, category, recipient(s), and results
Award	Date of ceremony	Category	Recipient(s)	Result	Ref(s)
Directors Guild of America Awards	12 March 2022	Outstanding Directing – Variety Specials	Paul Dugdale	Won	
Primetime Creative Arts Emmy Awards	3 September 2022	Outstanding Variety Special (Pre-Recorded)	Ben Winston, Adele Adkins, Jonathan Dickins, Raj Kapoor, Tara Montgomery and Terry Wood (executive producers); Rob Paine (co-executive producer)	Won	
Primetime Creative Arts Emmy Awards	3 September 2022	Outstanding Directing for a Variety Special	Paul Dugdale	Won	
Primetime Creative Arts Emmy Awards	3 September 2022	Outstanding Lighting Design / Lighting Direction for a Variety Special	Noah Mitz, Bryan Klunder, Patrick Boozer, Patrick Brazil and Matthew Cotter	Won	
Primetime Creative Arts Emmy Awards	3 September 2022	Outstanding Sound Mixing for a Variety Series or Special	Paul Wittman, Tom Elmhirst, Eric Schilling, Josh Morton, Kristian Pedregon, Shane O'Connor and Christian Schrader	Won	
Primetime Creative Arts Emmy Awards	3 September 2022	Outstanding Technical Direction, Camerawork, Video Control for a Special	Michael Anderson, Dan Winterburn, Danny Webb, Rob Palmer, David Eastwood, Vincent Foeillet, Allen Merriweather, Bruce Green, Robert Del Russo, Brian Lataille, Keith Dicker, Patrick Gleason, Danny Bonilla, Rob Vuona, Dave Rudd, Keyan Safyari, Freddy Frederick, Gabriel De La Perna, Jofre Rosero, David Carline, Kosta Krstic, Terrance Ho and Joey Lopez	Won	
Grammy Awards	5 February 2023	Best Music Film	Adele (artist); Paul Dugdale (video director); Raj Kapoor and Ben Winston (video producers)	Nominated	

== See also ==
- Adele at the BBC
- Adele Live in New York City
