= Million Years Ago (song) =

2015 song by Adele

Song by Adele

from the album 25
- Studio: Metropolis Studios, London
- Genre: Folk
- Length: 3:47
- Label: XL
- Songwriters: Adele Adkins; Greg Kurstin
- Producer: Greg Kurstin

"Million Years Ago" is a song recorded by English singer-songwriter Adele for her third studio album, 25 (2015). Adele wrote the song with Greg Kurstin, who also produced it. Lyrically, the track is about how fame has personally affected her and everyone around her. On Adele at the BBC in 2015, she stated that the song was, "kind of a story about (...) I drove past Brockwell Park, which is a park in South London I used to live by. It's where I spent a lot of my youth". Musically, the song is an acoustic tune accompanied only by guitar.

"Million Years Ago" charted in Australia, Belgium, Canada, France, Finland, Germany, Hungary, Ireland, Spain, the United Kingdom, and the United States. Adele performed the song during Adele at the BBC, Adele Live in New York City, and on Today.

The song faced controversy and legal issues after Adele was accused of plagiarising the song "Mulheres" by Toninho Geraes. In December 2024, a Brazilian court ruled that the song was plagiarised, and Adele was ordered to cease all publication of "Million Years Ago". However, in May 2025, a Rio Court of Justice ruled that "Million Years Ago" should be available on digital platforms.

== Composition ==
"Million Years Ago"
A 22-second sample of "Million Years Ago"'s chorus, an acoustic tune accompanied only by guitar.

"Million Years Ago" is an acoustic tune accompanied only by guitar, finds Adele pining "for the normality of her not-so-distant childhood. Entwined with Middle Eastern twists of background hums that suggest Madonna's 'Frozen'". The song's lyrics touch upon themes of fame, and how it "frightens", the song's lyrics talk about how fame has personally affected her and everyone around her, singing about how she misses the air, her mother, and her friends, but her "life is flashing by and all I can do is watch and cry." Jon Pareles of The New York Times described the song as a "delicate guitar ballad with a hint of Edith Piaf [that] mourns lost youth". Rolling Stone's Brian Hiatt compared the song to "a Nineties Madonna ballad mixed with 'The Girl From Ipanema'".

== Plagiarism accusations ==
In November 2015, on social media, fans of the Kurdish singer Ahmet Kaya accused Adele of plagiarism, noting similarities between "Million Years Ago", and the title song from Kaya's second album, Acilara Tutunmak, released in 1985. Turkish music critic Naim Dilmener said, "I don't think Adele listened to Ahmet Kaya's song and copied it deliberately." He also found Kaya's song similar to other melodies, saying that the tune was "a simple combination". Kaya's widow Gülten disputed the claims of musical theft. She told the Turkish national newspaper Posta that she did not believe any similarities were intentional, adding, "however, if she consciously did it, then it would be theft."

In September 2021, Adele was accused by Brazilian composer Toninho Geraes of plagiarising his samba song "Mulheres" ("Women"), recorded by Brazilian singer Martinho da Vila in 1995. After Adele's representatives did not respond, the song's author said he would take the case to court. In December 2024, judge Victor Torres in Rio de Janeiro ruled that the song was plagiarism and had to be pulled globally, and that Adele should compensate Toninho Geraes. Universal Music filed an appeal against the injunction, stating that both works use a musical cliché found in other songs released before "Mulheres", like "Yesterday When I Was Young".

In May 2025, a Rio Court of Justice ruled that the "Million Years Ago" should be available on digital platforms. The decision was made by the 1st Private Law Chamber of the Court of Justice of Rio de Janeiro, which did not see "elements that demonstrate the risk of harm or risk to the useful outcome of the case, since the British singer's song was released 10 years ago, in 2015".

== Live performances ==
She performed the song on Adele at the BBC, which was recorded at The London Studios on 2 November 2015 and broadcast on BBC One on 20 November 2015. She also performed the song on Today on 25 November 2015. Adele also performed the song on Adele Live in New York City, which was recorded at a one-night-only show at Radio City Music Hall on 17 November 2015 and broadcast on NBC on 14 December 2015.

Adele received a Daytime Emmy Award for Outstanding Musical Performance in a Daytime Program nomination for performing "Million Years Ago" live on Today.

== Charts ==
Chart (2015–2017)	Peak position
Australia (ARIA)	84
Belgium (Ultratop 50 Flanders)	48
Belgium (Ultratop 50 Wallonia)	46
Canada Hot 100 (Billboard)	97
Finland Download (Latauslista)	8
France (SNEP)	42
Germany (GfK)	74
Hungary (Single Top 40)	36
Ireland (IRMA)	94
Israel International Airplay (Media Forest)	3
Netherlands Digital Songs (Billboard)	7
Scotland Singles (OCC)	24
Spain (Promusicae)	25
South Korea International Chart (Gaon)	22
UK Singles (OCC)	64
UK Indie (OCC)	10
US Bubbling Under Hot 100 (Billboard)	19
US Digital Song Sales (Billboard)	28

== Certifications ==
Region	Certification	Certified units/sales
Canada (Music Canada)	Platinum	80,000^{‡}
New Zealand (RMNZ)	Gold	15,000^{‡}
United Kingdom (BPI)	Silver	200,000^{‡}
^{‡} Sales+streaming figures based on certification alone.
