= When We Were Young (Adele song) =

2016 single by Adele

Single by Adele

from the album 25
- Released: 22 January 2016
- Studio: Dean Street (London)
- Genre: Soul
- Length: 4:50
- Label: XL
- Songwriters: Adele Adkins; Tobias Jesso Jr.
- Producer: Ariel Rechtshaid

Adele singles chronology
"Hello" (2015)	"When We Were Young" (2016)	"Send My Love (To Your New Lover)" (2016)

Live video
- "When We Were Young" on YouTube

"When We Were Young" is a song by English singer Adele from her third studio album, 25 (2015). Adele and Tobias Jesso Jr. wrote the song, and Ariel Rechtshaid produced it. The song was written within three days in Los Angeles, after Adele struggled with writer's block during unfruitful early sessions for the album. XL Recordings released it as the album's second single on 22 January 2016. A soul ballad, the song has piano instrumentation that places emphasis on Adele's vocals. Inspired by the vision of meeting acquaintances at a party at an older age, it explores the fear of getting older and the loss of one's youth.

"When We Were Young" received acclaim from music critics, with praise directed towards its production and emotional lyrics. The song reached the top 10 in 11 countries, including the United Kingdom, Canada, and Scotland. It received a 6× Platinum certification in Canada, a 3× Platinum certification in the UK, and a 2× Platinum certification in Denmark and Norway. A performance filmed at The Church Studios in London was released on Vevo. Adele performed the song during her television specials, and at Saturday Night Live, The Ellen DeGeneres Show, and the Brit Awards 2016.

== Background and release ==
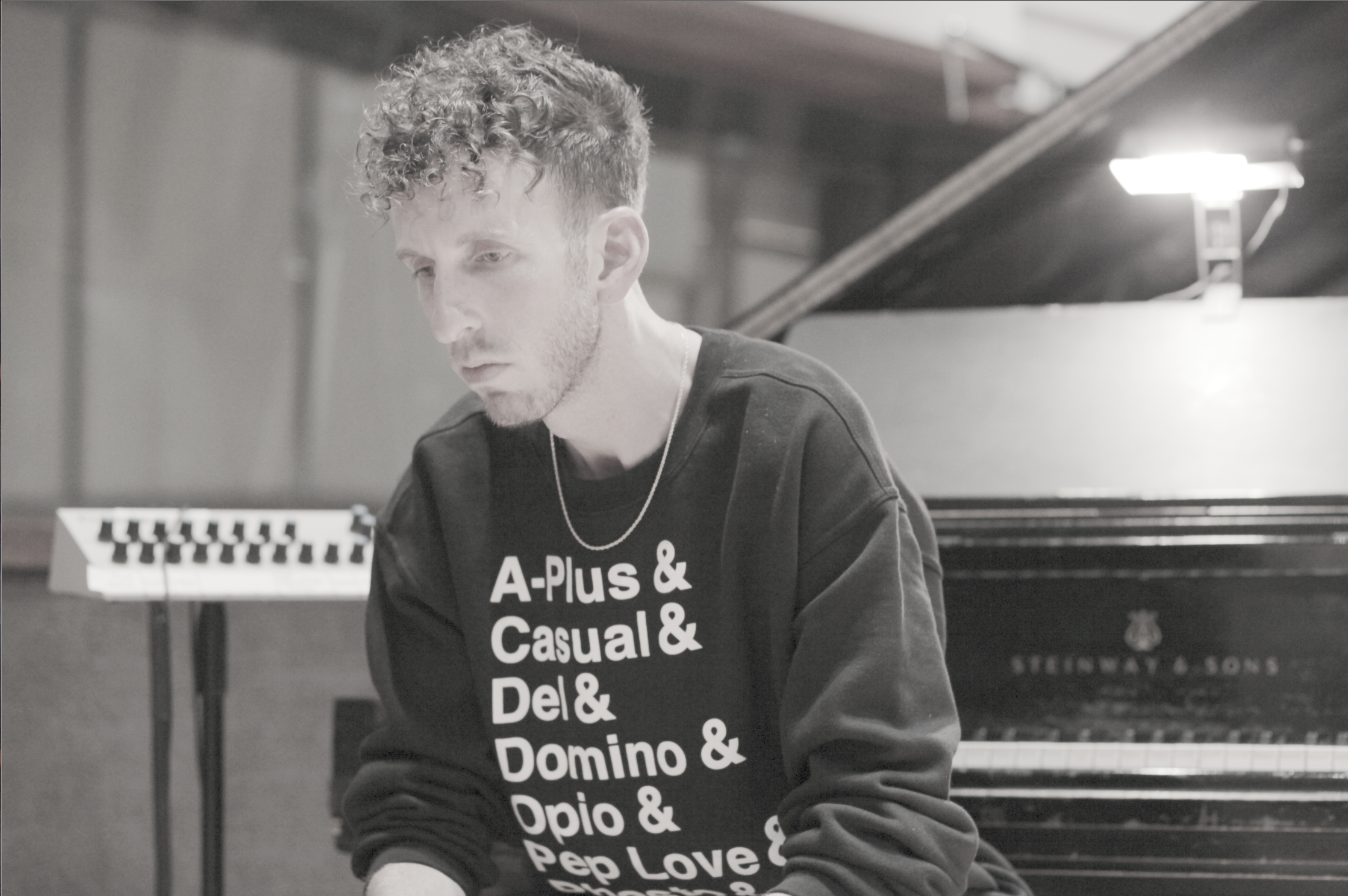
American record producer Ariel Rechtshaid produced the song.

Adele announced in February 2013 that she was holding various meetings related to her third studio album. Initial recording sessions for the album were unfruitful, she recounted: "I felt like I was never going to finish this record. It was a long process. I wanted to give up a lot because I couldn't do it. I thought I'd run out of ideas and I'd lost my ability to write a song." Adele struggled with writer's block and her manager, who was also unsure about the material, asked Rick Rubin, a producer of many songs on her sophomore studio album 21 (2011). Rubin claimed he didn't believe in the songs. Adele, too, admitted she felt it was a little rushed. In early 2015, she flew to Los Angeles to work with new songwriters and producers for two months, including Canadian musician Tobias Jesso Jr., after discovering his song "Hollywood". Their managers talked about the collaboration, and they spent about three days writing, conceiving "When We Were Young". The song was written in a house in Los Angeles, at Philip Glass' piano that Jesso had inherited. They started the song from scratch, as Jesso "would play chords while Adele improvised melodies and lyrics". As Jesso recounted, "There was no studio, just a piano and us, and we wrote a lot. I mean a lot lot."

American record producer Ariel Rechtshaid heard rumours that Adele and Jesso wanted to work with him. He flew to London and produced two songs for her. After Adele told him that she loved the track, but had a lot of ballads on the album already, he returned to Los Angeles and started creating a rhythm track for it. Rechtshaid recalled struggling not to make it "over-the-top dramatic, kind of epic". He thought the song had "an old soul vibe", and desired to have it "a little bit more modern". Rechtshaid told The Fader that it only took two takes to record the song, and during the middle eight, he pushed Adele beyond her means, since he "felt that it needed to have a little bit more cry to it".

On 16 November 2015, Australian TV program 60 Minutes broadcast a preview of "When We Were Young". A day later, the song's performance at the Church Studios in London was uploaded to Vevo. On 26 November 2015, Billboard wrote an article questioning what would be 25's next single, indicating either "When We Were Young" or "Send My Love (To Your New Lover)" would be their pick. On 12 December 2015, the magazine confirmed "When We Were Young" as the album's second single, through a source at Columbia Records. It was released for radio airplay in Italy on 22 January 2016, and for digital download in various countries on 29 January 2016. The official artwork features "a throwback picture of her younger self". Lindsay Sullivan of Billboard called it "adorable", while Lewis Corner of Digital Spy wondered, "How much more cute can you get than a primary school Adele, grinning from ear to ear with her two front teeth missing?"

== Composition and lyrical interpretation ==
"When We Were Young"
A 29-second sample of the song's chorus, where Adele nostalgically reminisces about past memories with an old acquaintance.

Adele and Jesso wrote "When We Were Young", and Rechtshaid produced it. The latter engineered the song and plays the organ, glockenspiel, synthesizer, and percussion. Jesso plays the piano and provided background vocals with Rechtshaid. The song incorporates bass, drums, and guitar in its instrumentation, was recorded at Dean Street Studios in London, and mixed at Capitol Studios in Los Angeles and Electric Lady Studios in New York City.

Musically, "When We Were Young" is a reflective soul ballad. Hattie Collins of i-D considered the song "a 70s styled shimmery disco ballad". It is built around "somber piano chords", which according to Pitchfork's Jeremy Gordon, are "designed to show off [Adele's] staggering, empathic voice". He said her vocals switch "between husky crackle to a soaring delivery before eventually climaxing with a come-to-Jesus money note". Adele described the song as "a very '70s singer-songwriter vibe". Brian Hiatt of Rolling Stone found it similar to the work of Elton John, and Barbra Streisand's "The Way We Were" (1973). Bruce Handy of Vanity Fair also compared it to Streisand. The song reminded The Fader's Owen Myers of Gladys Knight.

The song is written in the key of D-sharp major (E♭ major), composed in 4/4 time, and has an unsteady tempo averaging 144 beats per minute (BPM).

Lyrically, "When We Were Young" deals with the fear of getting older, a recurring theme on 25. The song "finds [Adele] reconnecting with [an] old acquaintance years after their adolescence, which prompts her to revisit those memories and to wish she could stop time". As noted by Maeve McDermott of USA Today, during the reunion, "Adele wistfully begins mourning before it's even over". During the song, she "watches as her youth slips away in real time", singing: "Let me photograph you in this light, in case it is the last time that we might be exactly like we were, before we realized we were sad of getting old." In the last chorus, Adele cries about "the inevitability of separation", singing: "I'm so mad I'm getting old, it makes me reckless." Spencer Kornhaber of The Atlantic stated that the first verse "is about her working up the courage to approach an old flame who 'everybody loves'". He added that the song "is another version of the revisitation narrative of 'Someone Like You' but this time, there's no 'never mind, I'll find someone else' portion. There's only her begging for a photo, because she's worried the future won't ever be as good as the past was."

In an interview with SiriusXM, Adele said the song "was based on us being older, and being at a party at this house, and seeing everyone that you've ever fallen out with, everyone that you've ever loved, everyone that you've never loved". In a song by song analysis by The New York Times, she recounted having "a vision of my best friend putting makeup on me for the first time when I was 17" while performing the song during rehearsals, which she appreciated: "Every time a new memory comes back in one of my songs for myself, I love it. It's like remembering your life through song." When interviewed by Nick Grimshaw on BBC Radio 1, Adele said that "When We Were Young" was her favourite track off 25.

== Critical reception ==
"When We Were Young" was met with acclaim from music critics. Gordon named it "Best New Track" and praised Adele's vocal performance and how she was "capable of elevating maudlin sentiment into high art". Stephen Thomas Erlewine of AllMusic selected the song as one of the album's highlights, noting that she took a risk enlisting Retchshaid to produce the track. Leah Greenblatt from Entertainment Weekly considered it one of the three best tracks of the album, noting that she was sincere with the nostalgic theme. Steven Arroyo of Consequence of Sound selected the song as one of the essential tracks on 25. Rob Garratt from The National was positive about Adele's writing skills, and praised her "fragilely affecting, but ultimately affirming" performance. Writing for Inquirer, Joseph R. Atilano remarked, "A single like this further showcases how lyrically intelligent she is as a composer as well as one of the greatest pure singers alive today." Matt Bagwell of The Huffington Post called it "stunning", and named it "the album's 'Someone Like You' – in other words, the 'big ballad'".

Corner noted that the lyrics "will squeeze your heart and give you a minor midlife crisis. That won't stop you from playing it over and over, though." Corbin Reiff from The A.V. Club praised Adele's "incredible, gritty sultriness on the verses". Justin Charity of Complex was also positive about her vocals, calling it "the wildest blossom of Adele's voice". Jon Dolan from Rolling Stone labelled the song a "mature [...] torchy ballad", while T. Cole Rachel of Spin defined it as "the kind of mawkish, overcooked melodrama that one imagines Adele could perform in her sleep". Chris Gerard from PopMatters was praiseful, naming the song "a bittersweet epic", and adding, "'When We Were Young' is breathtaking, an example of how great Adele can be when all the stars align. This slow-burning ballad which builds to a powerful climax should have been the first single. It's more complex than 'Hello', has more emotional depth, and Adele's vocals are good enough to bring tears to the eyes. 25 is worth picking up for this song alone."

Time named "When We Were Young" the seventh-best song of 2015. Several music critics have placed the song in their lists of Adele's best songs. Rolling Stone listed it as Adele's fifth-best, and Larisha Paul elaborated that "she spins the existential crisis-inducing topics of time and aging into what feels like a snapshot of our own past, present, and future". Billboard's Chuck Arnold placed "When We Were Young" at number 11 in a ranking of her discography, and noted that it "gets you all up in your feelings" and "longing for 'someone [you] used to know". Parade and American Songwriter each ranked the song number two on their lists of Adele's greatest songs. Alexis Petridis of The Guardian named it as Adele's 18th best song.

== Commercial performance ==
"When We Were Young" peaked at number nine on the UK Singles Chart and received a 3× Platinum certification in the United Kingdom from the British Phonographic Industry (BPI). On 14 December 2015, Billboard reported that the song had sold 150,000 downloads in the United States, the second-most from 25. The song reached number 14 on the US Billboard Hot 100, and the Recording Industry Association of America certified it Platinum. "When We Were Young" charted at number nine on the Canadian Hot 100, and earned a 5× Platinum certification in Canada from Music Canada.

In Australia, "When We Were Young" peaked at number 13 on the ARIA Top 50 Singles Chart and the Australian Recording Industry Association certified it Platinum. The song reached number 23 on the Top 40 Singles Chart in New Zealand, and received a Gold certification in New Zealand from Recorded Music NZ. Elsewhere, it charted within the top 10: at number three in Finland, Iceland, Scotland, Slovakia, number five in Switzerland, number six in Belgium, the Czech Republic, number eight in South Africa, and number 10 in Portugal. "When We Were Young" earned a 2× Platinum certification in Denmark, Norway, Platinum in Italy, Portugal, Mexico, and Gold in Belgium.

== Live performances ==
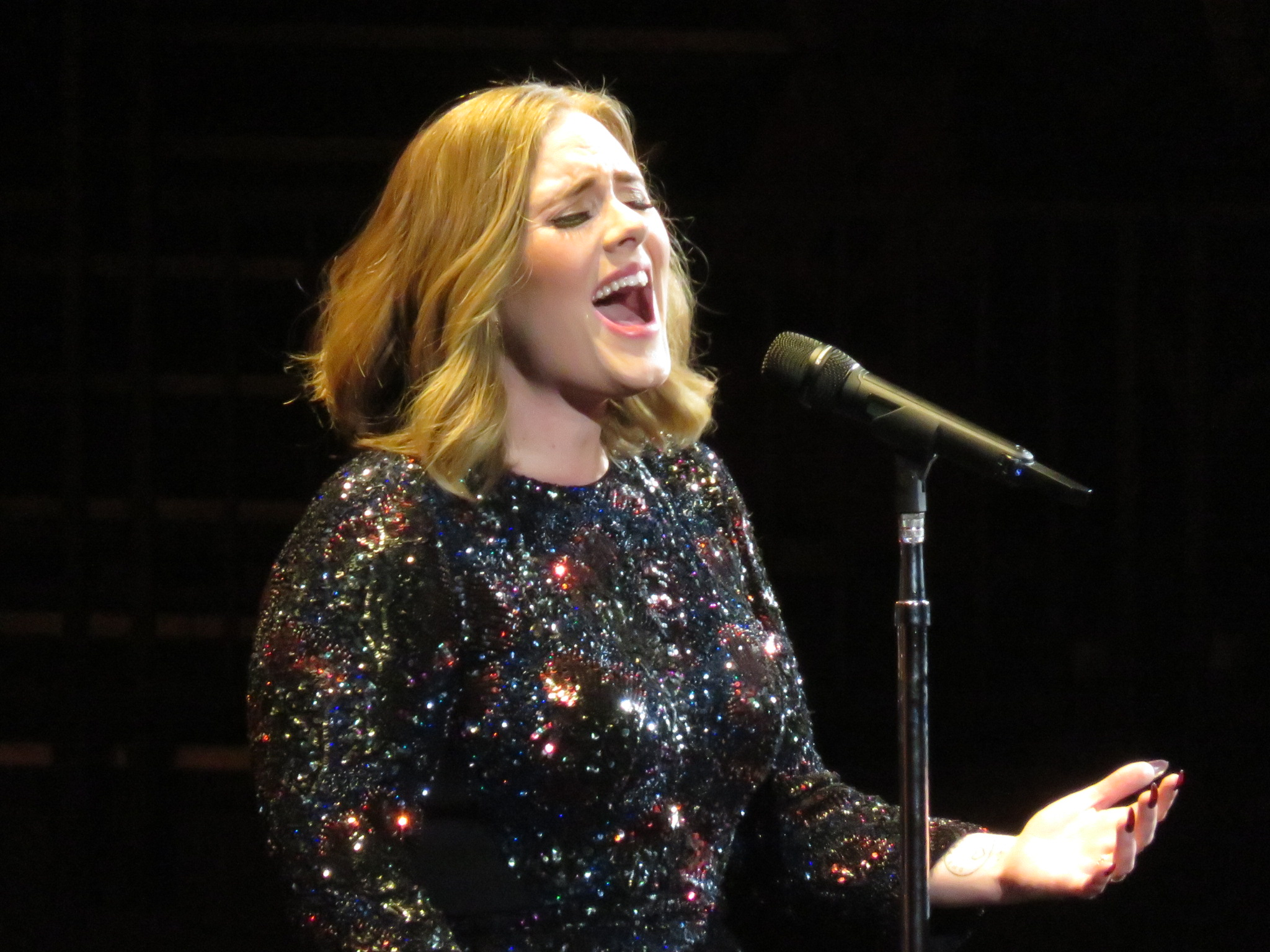
Adele performing "When We Were Young" during her concert tour in 2016

Adele performed "When We Were Young" live with numerous backup singers, afront large speakers, at The Church Studios in London, which was filmed and uploaded to Vevo on 17 November 2015. She reprised the song live during her BBC One special Adele at the BBC, recorded at The London Studios on 2 November 2015. Adele sang it on Saturday Night Live on 21 November 2015; MTV News' Renan Borelli commented that she "absolute[ly] crushed [it]". She performed "When We Were Young" during her NBC special Adele Live in New York City, recorded at Radio City Music Hall on 17 November 2015.

On 17 February 2016, Adele reprised the song at The Ellen DeGeneres Show. She sang it as the closing song at the Brit Awards 2016 on 24 February. Adele included "When We Were Young" on the encore of her set list for the Glastonbury Festival 2016, and her 2016 concert tour. She sang the song during her CBS special Adele One Night Only, ITV special An Audience with Adele (2021), and her British Summer Time concerts on 1 and 2 July 2022.

== Cover versions ==
American singer Demi Lovato covered "When We Were Young" at the Future Now Tour on 2 September 2016. Rolling Stone's Daniel Kreps wrote that "Lovato delivered a faithful, slightly sped-up take on the 25 single, which Lovato used as another vessel to showcase her powerful vocals". Colin Stutz of Billboard stated she "put her vocal chops on full display" and justified her place on the list "of the best singers in pop music". According to Digital Spy, Lovato "did justice" to the song and delivered "a performance that will blow you away". MTV News' Hilary Hughes commended her confidence for attempting to cover an Adele song and thought she "utterly nailed" it, adding, "[she] showcas[ed] her range and reach[ed] the rafters with high notes that just wouldn't quit". In 2023, Filipino singer Colet Vergara covered the song at Spotify's "Parinig Mo" (transl. Let Them Hear) event. Writing for The Philippine Star's Latest Chika news portal, Julienne Loreto described it as a "powerhouse" performance.

== Credits and personnel ==
Credits are adapted from the liner notes of 25.

Recording

- Recorded at Dean Street Studios, London
- Mixed at Capitol Studios, Los Angeles, and Electric Lady Studios, New York City

Personnel

- Adele – songwriting, vocals
- Tobias Jesso Jr. – songwriting, backing vocals, piano
- Ariel Rechtshaid – production, backing vocals, programming, engineering, organ, glockenspiel, synthesizer, percussion
- Gus Seyffert – bass
- Joey Waronker – drums
- Benji Lysaght – guitar
- Nico Muhly – prepared piano, harmonium
- Roger Manning Jr. – optigan, B3
- Austen Jux Chandler – engineering
- Chris Kaysch – engineering
- David Schiffman – engineering
- Nick Rowe – additional engineering
- Aaron Ahmad – assistant engineer
- Christopher Cerullo – assistant engineer
- John DeBold – assistant engineer
- Michael Harris – assistant engineer

== Charts ==
=== Weekly charts ===
Weekly chart positions for "When We Were Young"
Chart (2015)	Peak position
Australia (ARIA)	13
Austria (Ö3 Austria Top 40)	11
Belgium (Ultratop 50 Flanders)	6
Belgium (Ultratop 50 Wallonia)	22
Canada Hot 100 (Billboard)	9
Canada AC (Billboard)	1
Canada CHR/Top 40 (Billboard)	24
Canada Hot AC (Billboard)	2
Czech Republic Airplay (ČNS IFPI)	6
Czech Republic Singles Digital (ČNS IFPI)	26
Denmark (Tracklisten)	27
Euro Digital Songs (Billboard)	7
Finland Download (Latauslista)	3
France (SNEP)	15
Germany (GfK)	29
Germany (Airplay Chart)	2
Hong Kong (HKRIA)	4
Hungary (Rádiós Top 40)	11
Hungary (Single Top 40)	11
Hungary (Stream Top 40)	31
Iceland (RÚV)	3
Ireland (IRMA)	12
Italy (FIMI)	56
Mexico (Billboard Mexican Airplay)	40
Netherlands (Dutch Top 40)	14
Netherlands (Single Top 100)	24
New Zealand (Recorded Music NZ)	23
Norway (VG-lista)	23
Poland Airplay (ZPAV)	16
Portugal (AFP)	10
Scottish Singles Sales (Official Charts)	3
Slovakia Airplay (ČNS IFPI)	3
Slovakia Singles Digital (ČNS IFPI)	24
Slovenia (SloTop50)	26
South Africa (RISA)	42
South Africa Airplay (EMA)	8
South Korea International Chart (Gaon)	5
Spain (Promusicae)	54
Sweden (Sverigetopplistan)	16
Switzerland (Schweizer Hitparade)	5
UK Singles (Official Charts)	9
UK Independent (Official Charts)	1
US Billboard Hot 100	14
US Adult Contemporary (Billboard)	6
US Adult Pop Airplay (Billboard)	3
US Dance Club Songs (Billboard)	1
US Pop Airplay (Billboard)	13
US Rock & Alternative Airplay (Billboard)	46

2021 weekly chart positions for "When We Were Young"
Chart (2021)	Peak position
Canada Digital Song Sales (Billboard)	39
Global 200 (Billboard)	37

=== Year-end charts ===
2016 year-end chart performance for "When We Were Young"
Chart (2016)	Position
Belgium (Ultratop Flanders)	52
Canada (Canadian Hot 100)	73
Denmark (Tracklisten)	81
Hungary (Single Top 40)	87
Iceland (Tónlistinn)	43
Netherlands (Dutch Top 40)	65
Netherlands (Single Top 100)	87
South Korea (Gaon Singles Chart) (Int'l.)	78
Sweden (Sverigetopplistan)	71
UK Singles (Official Charts Company)	58
US Billboard Hot 100	83
US Adult Contemporary (Billboard)	16
US Adult Top 40 (Billboard)	20
US Dance Club Songs (Billboard)	39

2017 year-end chart performance for "When We Were Young"
Chart (2017)	Position
South Korea (Gaon Singles Chart) (Int'l.)	80

== Certifications ==
Certifications for "When We Were Young"
Region	Certification	Certified units/sales
Australia (ARIA)	Platinum	70,000^{‡}
Belgium (BRMA)	Gold	10,000^{‡}
Brazil (Pro-Música Brasil)	Diamond	250,000^{‡}
Canada (Music Canada)	6× Platinum	480,000^{‡}
Denmark (IFPI Danmark)	3× Platinum	270,000^{‡}
Italy (FIMI)	Platinum	50,000^{‡}
Mexico (AMPROFON)	Platinum	60,000^{‡}
New Zealand (RMNZ)	5× Platinum	150,000^{‡}
Norway (IFPI Norway)	2× Platinum	120,000^{‡}
Portugal (AFP)	Platinum	20,000^{‡}
Spain (Promusicae)	2× Platinum	120,000^{‡}
South Korea (Gaon Chart)	—	375,383
United Kingdom (BPI)	4× Platinum	2,400,000^{‡}
United States (RIAA)	Platinum	1,000,000^{‡}
^{‡} Sales+streaming figures based on certification alone.

== Radio and release history ==
Release dates and format(s) for "When We Were Young"
Region	Date	Format	Label	Ref.
Italy	22 January 2016	Radio airplay	XL	
Australia	29 January 2016	Digital download	XL	
China	29 January 2016	Digital download	XL	
New Zealand	29 January 2016	Digital download	XL	

== See also ==
- List of Billboard Dance Club Songs number ones of 2016
- List of UK Independent Singles Chart number ones of 2016
