= Adele at the BBC =

Television special

- Presented by: Graham Norton
- Starring: Adele
- Country of origin: United Kingdom
- Original language: English

Production
- Executive producer: Guy Freeman
- Producers: Anouk Fontaine, Lawrie Jordan, Daniel Brookes
- Production locations: London, United Kingdom
- Running time: 65 minutes

Original release
- Network: BBC One
- Release: 20 November 2015

Adele at the BBC (also known as Adele Live in London to some international markets) is a television special featuring British singer and songwriter Adele, hosted by Graham Norton for BBC One, and which was recorded at The London Studios, London, United Kingdom on 2 November 2015. The programme featured Adele and her live band performing songs from her repertoire and third studio album 25 (2015), as well as other songs from her other two albums, 19 (2008) and 21 (2011), alongside Adele being interviewed by Norton.

The show featured the first public performance of her single "Hello" and two other tracks from 25, and her first television appearance since the 85th Academy Awards (2013). It also featured sketch sections, where Adele interacted with her fans, including a group of Adele impersonators. The show was broadcast on Friday 20 November on BBC One from 20:30 – 21:35 GMT, the same day that her new album 25 was released.

Since this was broadcast, numerous other artists have had "at the BBC" specials too: Michael Bublé, Harry Styles, Sam Smith, U2 and Ariana Grande.

== Background ==
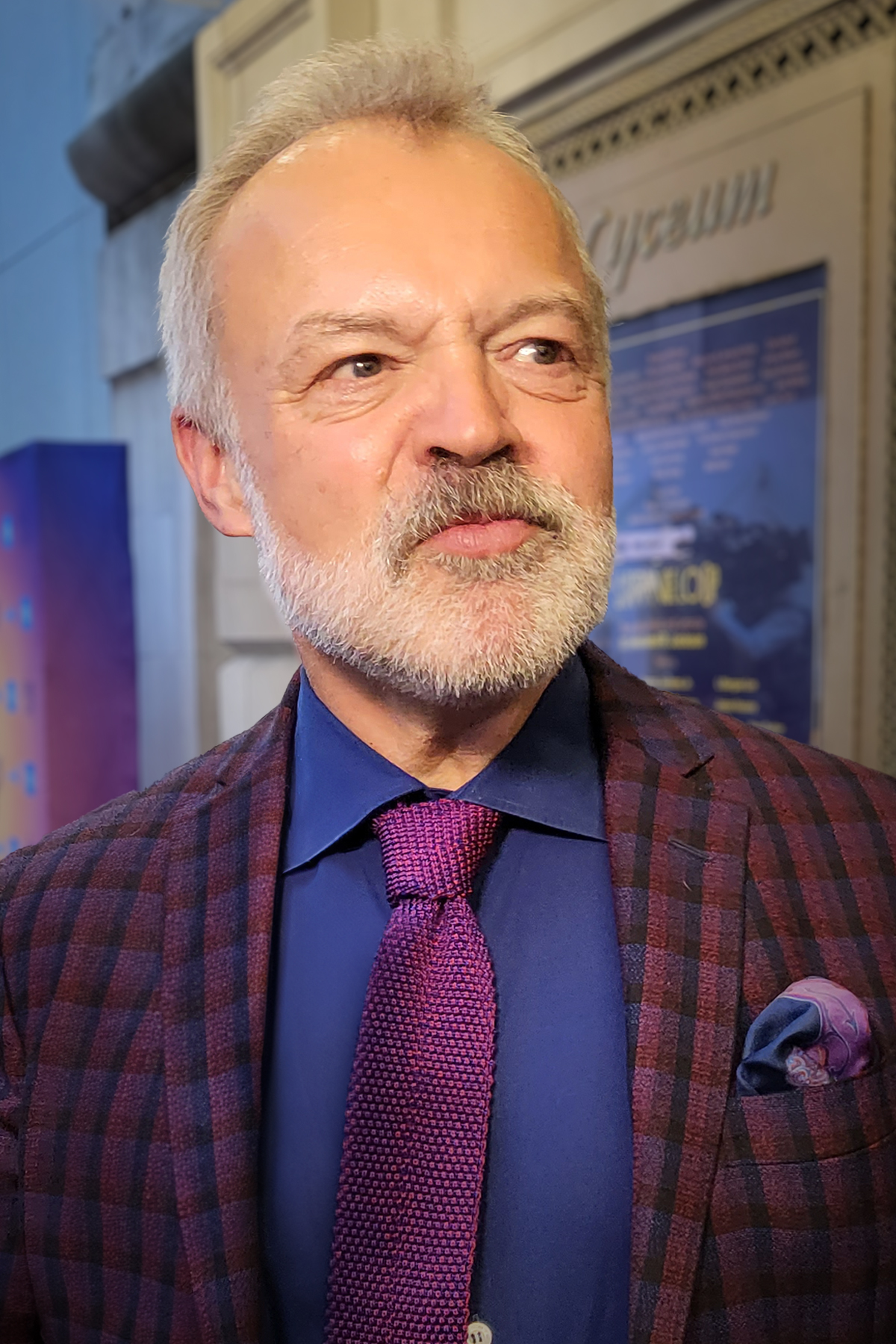
The special was hosted by Graham Norton (pictured)

Following the release of 21 (2011), Adele was considering quitting the music industry altogether, stating she thought it was better to "go out on a high". However, in early 2012 she announced she was simply taking a hiatus from music in order to "take time and live a little bit". Her hiatus from music came to an end after the birth of her first child in October 2012, with Adele stating her son inspired her to start recording music again in order for him to "know what I do". In early October, Adele released a letter to her fans through social media addressing the album, in which she confirmed that the album would be titled 25.

Adele confirmed that 25 would be released on 20 November 2015, and revealed its cover simultaneously on Facebook and Twitter. On October 2, 2015 numerous music journalists began reporting that it was suspected that Adele had been offered a one-hour TV special on the BBC, however these reports were not confirmed. On 27 October, following the reports BBC One announced plans for Adele at the BBC, a one-hour special presented by Graham Norton in which he will talk to Adele about her new album. The show was recorded before a live audience on 2 November and was transmitted on BBC One on 20 November 2015. Tickets for the live show, which were free, were made available through a lottery style system and were requested by the public.

The show marks the first live performances by Adele of three songs from the album 25: "Hello", "When We Were Young", and "Million Years Ago".

== Songs performed ==
1. "Rolling in the Deep"
2. "Hello"
3. "Rumour Has It"
4. "Skyfall"
5. "Million Years Ago"
6. "Hometown Glory"
7. "When We Were Young"
8. "Someone like You"
- "Make You Feel My Love" is also featured, as part of a sketch in which Adele is seen auditioning for a television special alongside a roomful of impersonators, posing as a nanny named "Jenny", before appearing on stage to surprise them.

== Broadcasting ==
The programme was broadcast on 20 November 2015 on BBC One, the same day that her new album 25 was released. BBC One aired an extended version of the programme on New Year's Day 2016, including further footage of the sketch in which Adele posed as Jenny. By 4 December 2015, footage of the scenes had been viewed 37 million times on the BBC's YouTube site, making it the most watched programme on there.

Prior to the show's announcement BBC Worldwide had secured numerous pre-sales for the one-off event, with broadcasters in Australia, Belgium, Canada, France, Italy, the Netherlands, New Zealand, Norway, Spain, Finland, Sweden, Ireland, Germany. The BBC secured deals with VRT, CTV, NPO 3 and Canal Plus respectively for hour-long BBC One show, BBC Worldwide offered international broadcasters the choice of buying the original 60-minute version of the show, hosted by Graham Norton and with his interview with Adele, or a 45-minute performance-only edit.

In Ireland the programme was simulcast on RTÉ2, where it aired as Adele Live in London.

== Reception ==
The programme received a five-star review from The Daily Telegraph, which described it as 'a stroke of genius' and 'old-fashioned, generous, fun and moving.'. Overnight viewing figures indicated that the one-off special was viewed by 4.54 million viewers, giving the programme a 19.8% audience share in that evening's 8.30pm timeslot. Consolidated figures show that the special was watched by a total of 6.36 million viewers and was the 11th most watched programme on BBC one during its week of broadcast.

== See also ==
- 2015 in British television
- Adele Live in New York City
- Adele One Night Only
