= Hello (Adele song) =

2015 single by Adele

Single by Adele

from the album 25
- Released: 23 October 2015
- Recorded: 2015
- Studio: Metropolis (London)
- Genre: Soul
- Length: 4:56 (album version); 4:15 (radio edit)
- Label: XL; Columbia
- Songwriters: Adele Adkins; Greg Kurstin
- Producer: Greg Kurstin

Adele singles chronology
"Skyfall" (2012)	"Hello" (2015)	"When We Were Young" (2016)

Music video
- "Hello" on YouTube

"Hello" is a song recorded by British singer-songwriter Adele, released on 23 October 2015 by XL Recordings as the lead single from her third studio album, 25 (2015). Written by Adele and the album's producer, Greg Kurstin, "Hello" is a piano ballad with soul influences (including guitar) and lyrics that discuss themes of nostalgia and regret. Upon release, the song garnered critical acclaim, with reviewers comparing it favourably to Adele's previous works and praised its lyrics, production and Adele's vocal performance. It was recorded in Metropolis Studios, London.

"Hello" was a massive global success. The single charted in a record-setting 30 countries, including in the United Kingdom where it became Adele's second chart topper, following "Someone Like You"; it also had the largest opening week sales in three years. In the United States, "Hello" debuted atop the Billboard Hot 100, reigning for ten consecutive weeks while becoming Adele's fourth number-one single on the chart and breaking several records, including becoming the first song to sell over a million digital copies in a week. By the end of 2015, it had sold 12.3 million units globally (combined sales and track-equivalent streams) and was the year's 7th best-selling single while it stands as one of the best-selling digital singles of all-time.

The accompanying music video was directed by Xavier Dolan and co-stars Adele and Tristan Wilds. It broke the Vevo and YouTube records for achieving over 27.7 million views within a 24-hour span, and the record for the shortest time to reach one billion views (87 days) respectively. "Hello" broke the iTunes records for being number 1 in most countries (102 countries). The music video for the song received seven nominations at the 2016 MTV Video Music Awards, including Video of the Year and Best Female Video. At the 59th Annual Grammy Awards, "Hello" won three awards: Record of the Year, Song of the Year, and Best Pop Solo Performance. The song also won the Brit Award for British Single, and APRA Award for International Work of the Year.

== Writing and composition ==
"Hello"
A 21-second sample of the chorus from "Hello", where Adele is singing the lines over layers of backing vocals, piano and drums "towards a very luscious wall of sound".

"Hello" was written by Adele and Greg Kurstin and produced by Kurstin, who also played bass, guitar, drums, piano and keyboards, while Adele played drums. "Hello" was written in Chiswick, London, something not normally done by Adele, who said she likes to write her music at home. The writing process for the song was slow, taking six months to complete. Initially Adele and Kurstin started writing the first verse; finishing half of the song, six months later Adele contacted Kurstin to finish the song with her, with Kurstin stating he was not sure "if Adele was ever going to come back and finish it."

"Hello" is a soul piano ballad, played in the key of F minor at a tempo of 79 beats per minute. The repeated chord progression heard in the verse, played by the piano, follows two progressions and a passage (Bridge) progression (passage or Bridge progression connects two main progressions to each other) of Progression #1: Fm(i)–A♭(III)–E♭(VII)–D♭(VI), Passage progression: Fm(i)–E♭(VII)-Cm(v)-D♭(VI)-Fm7(i7)-E♭(VII)–D♭(VI), Progression #2:Fm(i)–D♭/F(VI)–A♭(III)–E♭(VII). According to Musicnotes.com, Adele's vocals span from F_{3} to A♭_{5} in the song. During the chorus, Adele is heard singing the lines over layers of backing vocals, piano and drums which were described by The Daily Telegraph as having "a very luscious wall of sound".

Lyrically, the song focuses on themes of nostalgia and regret, and was seen as a follow-up to her single "Someone like You" appearing to reflect on a failed relationship. The song's lyrics were also seen as being conversational, revolving around "all the relationships of her past", ranging from friends, family members and ex-partners. Speaking on the song's lyrical content, Adele told Nick Grimshaw on The Radio 1 Breakfast Show: "I felt all of us were moving on, and it's not about an ex-relationship, a love relationship, it's about my relationship with everyone that I love. It's not that we have fallen out, we've all got our lives going on and I needed to write that song so they would all hear it, because I'm not in touch with them." According to Adele, the line "Hello from the other side" signifies "the other side of becoming an adult, making it out alive from your late teens, early twenties."

== Release ==
On 18 October 2015, a 30-second clip of "Hello" was played during a commercial break on The X Factor in the United Kingdom. The commercial teased what was then new material, with her vocals accompanied by lyrics on a black screen. Josh Duboff of Vanity Fair wrote that "the Internet collectively lost their minds" after the broadcast of the trailer. On 22 October, Adele announced the upcoming release of 25 to her fans on Twitter. She also shared that "Hello" would be released on 23 October as the lead single off of the album. On 23 October, Adele joined Nick Grimshaw's show on BBC Radio 1 for the song's premiere.

== Critical reception ==
"Hello" received universal critical acclaim. Alexis Petridis of The Guardian described it as "a big ballad, but a superior example of its kind", and opined that the song is "precisely the kind of lovelorn epic ballad that made Adele one of the biggest stars in the world." Writing for The Independent, Emily Jupp stated in her review of the song that it "might not be groundbreaking, but Adele's return with her familiar, smoky sound is very welcome". She called it an "'if it ain't broke' ballad" and said: "Adele does what she does best, belting out emotional tales of love and loss much the same as with her last album, 21, but this time, with a little more self-forgiveness."

Greg Kot of the Chicago Tribune wrote: "Lyrics that work best when they zoom in on personal details match her combination of vocal power and restraint." Neil McCormick from The Daily Telegraph called it "a beautiful song of loss and regret", adding that "it takes a grip on the kind of memory every listener holds somewhere in their heart and merges it with Adele's own drama." Rolling Stone ranked "Hello" at number 6 on its year-end list to find the 50 best songs of 2015. Several publications have commented on similarities in the theme of the song and accompanying video with that of "Hello" by American singer Lionel Richie.

In 2021, Parade ranked the song number 12 on their list of the 25 greatest Adele songs. Further, in 2022, American Songwriter ranked the song number three on their list of the 10 greatest Adele songs.

== Chart performance ==
=== Europe and Oceania ===
Three days after its release, the Official Charts Company announced that "Hello" had accumulated 165,000 chart sales in the United Kingdom, of which 156,000 were downloads. "Hello" entered at the top of the UK Singles Chart on 30 October 2015, – for the week dated 5 November 2015 – with 333,000 combined sales, of which 259,000 were downloads, making it the biggest selling number-one single on the chart in three years. It marked Adele's second UK number-one single, after 2011's "Someone like You". Additionally, "Hello" was streamed 7.32 million times in its first week, breaking the streaming record previously held by Justin Bieber's "What Do You Mean?". Including streaming sales and excluding The X Factor and Pop Idol winners' singles, major charity campaign records and Christmas number ones, "Hello" was the second biggest selling number one of the 21st century in the UK, beaten only by Shaggy's "It Wasn't Me", which sold 345,000 copies in a week in February 2001. The following week, the song remained at number one after selling a further 121,000 downloads and was streamed 5.78 million times, the same week the song was certified Gold by the BPI. On 20 May 2016, it spent its 30th week in the UK Top 100. As of November 2016, the song has sold 918,700 in pure sales.

The song also debuted at number one in Belgium, Czech Republic, France, Germany, Greece, Hungary, Ireland, Israel, Italy, Lebanon, Luxembourg, The Netherlands, Norway, Portugal, Scotland, Slovakia, Spain and Switzerland.

In Australia, "Hello" entered at the top of the ARIA Singles Chart on 31 October 2015, selling over 59,075 units, which earned the song a gold certification in its first week. The song also became the second fastest-selling single of the year, behind Wiz Khalifa's "See You Again". It marked Adele's second number-one single on the ARIA Singles Chart following 2011's "Someone like You". The single stayed atop the chart for a second week and was certified platinum selling over 70,000 units. On 20 March 2017, Hello re-entered the chart at number 50 and has so far been certified 7× platinum for sales over 490,000 units. In New Zealand, the song debuted at number one on the New Zealand singles chart, holding the position the following week and was certified platinum.

=== North America ===
In the United States, "Hello" debuted at the top of the Billboard Hot 100 on 2 November 2015, for the chart dated 14 November 2015, becoming only the 24th song to debut at number one. "Hello" started at number 49 on the Radio Songs chart, after three days of release. In its first full week of airplay, it rose from 45 to 9, up 146% to 70 million all format audience impressions. The track started at number one on the On-Demand Songs chart with a record 20.4 million on-demand streams, becoming her first number-one song on the chart. "Hello" entered at the top of the Digital Songs chart with sales of 1,112,000, becoming the first track to sell over one million digital copies in a single week and almost doubling the record for the most downloads sold in a week, previously held by Flo Rida's "Right Round", which sold 636,000 downloads in the week ending 28 February 2009. "Hello" started with 61.6 million US streams, becoming her first number-one song and the second greatest weekly total on the Streaming Songs chart, behind Baauer's "Harlem Shake", which registered 103 million streams on week of 3 March 2013. "Hello" is the first song to sell more than a million digital copies in a single week and the third highest weekly sales total since Nielsen SoundScan began tracking sales in 1991. Only Elton John's "Candle in the Wind 1997/Something About the Way You Look Tonight" has sold more in a single week, selling 3.446 million copies in its opening week and 1.212 million copies in its second week.

In its second week, "Hello" stayed at number one on the US Billboard Hot 100, selling another 635,000 digital copies marking the third-best digital sales week and the highest for a non-debut week. "Hello" also held atop Streaming Songs with 47.4 million US streams, down 23 percent from 61.6 million in its first week, the track also stayed atop the On-Demand Songs with 18.1 million streams. On the Radio Songs chart, "Hello" moved from 9 to 6, up by 46% to 106 million all-format audience impressions, thus becoming the top Airplay Gainer on the Hot 100. The track also moved from two to one on the Adult Alternative Songs airplay chart and moved nine to four on the Adult Contemporary format. The following week, the song stayed at the top of the Hot 100 and Digital Songs chart, selling 480,000 downloads and becoming just the third song to sell over 400,000 copies for three straight weeks. "Hello" also rose from 6 to 1 on the Radio Songs chart in just its fourth week (the greatest leap to number one on the chart's 25-year history), marking the quickest climb to number one on the chart in 22 years, since Mariah Carey's "Dreamlover" reached the top in its fourth frame on 28 August 1993. Additionally, "Hello" became just the third song to top the Hot 100, Digital Songs, Streaming Songs, On-Demand Songs and Radio Songs tallies simultaneously in the nearly three years all five charts had coexisted. "Hello" remained atop the Hot 100 for ten consecutive weeks, becoming only the 31st No. 1 in the Hot 100's history to reign for at least 10 weeks, and only the 4th for a number one debut, following "One Sweet Day" by Mariah Carey and Boyz II Men (16 weeks), "Candle in the Wind 1997/Something About the Way You Look Tonight" by Elton John (14 weeks) and I'll Be Missing You by Puff Daddy & Faith Evans featuring 112 (11 weeks). By spending a tenth week at the top of the chart, it became Adele's longest-running number-one single and the longest-leading Hot 100 No. 1 by a solo female since Rihanna's "We Found Love," featuring Calvin Harris, which also led for 10 weeks in 2011–2012. As of January 2016, it had sold 3.7 million downloads. The single also benefitted from numerous Dance/EDM remixes as well, thus resulting in "Hello" topping Billboard's Dance Club Songs and Dance/Mix Show Airplay charts. On the chart dated 23 April 2016, the song spent a 21st week at the top of the Adult Contemporary Chart, matching the record set by Kelly Clarkson's "Breakaway" (2005) and Celine Dion's "A New Day Has Come" (2002) for the longest No. 1 run among women since the list launched in 1961. It also equaled the third-longest stay at the summit among all acts. On 20 September 2016, the song was certified as seven-times platinum by Recording Industry Association of America.

"Hello" debuted at number one on the Canadian Hot 100 on 3 November 2015, for the chart dated 14 November 2015, selling 140,000 copies and outsold Justin Bieber's "Sorry", which sold 40,000 units the same week. The song was streamed 4.79 million times in its first week, setting a record for the most streamed track in a single week in Canada.

== Accolades ==
At the 36th Brit Awards, Adele was nominated for five awards, in which she won four including British Single of the Year for "Hello". At the 2016 Billboard Music Awards, the singer was nominated for nine categories, winning five, including Top Selling Song for "Hello". At the 2016 Juno Awards, Xavier Dolan won Video of the Year for "Hello". Adele received four American Music Awards nominations, including Favorite Pop/Rock Song for "Hello" at the American Music Awards of 2016 but lost to "Love Yourself" by Justin Bieber. At the 59th Grammy Awards Adele took home five awards, including Album of the Year for 25, while "Hello" won Record of the Year, Song of the Year and Best Pop Solo Performance. Adele is the first artist in Grammys history to sweep the Big Three awards – Album, Record and Song of the Year – twice. She also the first woman in Grammy history to win Song of the Year twice. This marks the first time in Grammy history that two different songs with the same title have been nominated in this category after "Hello" by Lionel Richie in 1985. Adele became the third woman to win Record of the Year more than once, after Roberta Flack and Norah Jones winning for The First Time Ever I Saw Your Face and Killing Me Softly with His Song; and Don't Know Why and Here We Go Again (with Ray Charles), respectively. Additionally, both Florence LaRue and Marilyn McCoo also receive this accolade twice as part of The 5th Dimension, with "Up, Up and Away" and "Aquarius/Let the Sunshine In".

Year	Organization	Award	Result	Ref.
2016	American Music Awards	Favourite Pop/Rock Song	Nominated	
2016	AIM Independent Music Awards	Independent Track of the Year	Won	
2016	BBC Music Awards	BBC Song of the Year	Won	
2016	Billboard Music Awards	Top Hot 100 Song	Nominated	
2016	Billboard Music Awards	Top Radio Song	Nominated	
2016	Billboard Music Awards	Top Selling Song	Won	
2016	BMI Awards	Pop Song Award	Won	
2016	Brit Awards	British Single	Won	
2016	Brit Awards	British Video of the Year	Nominated	
2016	Danish Music Awards	International Hit of the Year	Nominated	
2016	ECHO Music Awards	Hit of the Year	Nominated	
2016	Guinness World Records	Fastest time for a video to reach one billion views on YouTube	Won	
2016	iHeartRadio Music Awards	Song of the Year	Won	
2016	iHeartRadio Music Awards	Best Lyrics	Nominated	
2016	Juno Awards	Video of the Year	Won	
2016	Latin American Music Awards	Favourite Song – Crossover	Nominated	
2016	Los Premios 40 Principales	International Song of the Year	Nominated	
2016	MTV Italian Music Awards	Best Tormentone (catchphrase)	Nominated	
2016	MTV Europe Music Award	Best Song	Nominated	
2016	MTV Video Music Awards	Video of the Year	Nominated	
2016	MTV Video Music Awards	Best Female Video	Nominated	
2016	MTV Video Music Awards	Best Pop Video	Nominated	
2016	MTV Video Music Awards	Best Direction	Nominated	
2016	MTV Video Music Awards	Best Art Direction	Nominated	
2016	MTV Video Music Awards	Best Cinematography	Nominated	
2016	MTV Video Music Awards	Best Editing	Nominated	
2016	MTV Video Music Awards Japan	Best International Video	Nominated	
2016	Nickelodeon Kids' Choice Awards	Favourite Song of the Year	Won	
2016	Premios Juventud	Favourite Hit	Won	
2016	Soul Train Music Awards	Song of the Year	Nominated	
2016	Soul Train Music Awards	The Ashford & Simpson Songwriter's Award	Nominated	
2016	Teen Choice Awards	Choice Music Single – Female	Nominated	
2016	Radio Disney Music Awards	Heartbreak – Best Breakup Song	Nominated	
2017	Apra Awards	International Work of the Year	Won	
2017	Grammy Awards	Record of the Year	Won	
2017	Grammy Awards	Song of the Year	Won	
2017	Grammy Awards	Best Pop Solo Performance	Won	

== Music video ==
"When I heard the song I saw a story right away. [The video] is highly unoriginal. The lyrics are 'Hello, it's me' and then you see someone picking up a phone. I'm not good at imagining super conceptual videos. I just thought it would be nice to have her walk around the house and make phone calls and end up in a forest, with maybe some flashbacks in it."

— Xavier Dolan, behind the concept of the music video

The accompanying music video for "Hello" was directed by Canadian actor and filmmaker Xavier Dolan and released on 23 October 2015, despite the fact the song was released as a single a day later. The concept of the video revolves around a recently broken-up young woman calling a younger version of herself. Portions of the video—mostly the finale on the pond and the shot of her opening her eyes in the beginning—were filmed with IMAX cameras, making it the first music video in IMAX format. The video draws inspiration from Dolan's semi-autobiographical debut I Killed My Mother, which was made when Dolan was barely 20. The video was filmed on a farm in Quebec over four days in September 2015.

The video stars American actor Tristan Wilds. According to Dolan, Adele called him after an unspecified incident of police brutality in the United States, suggesting that a white male not be cast as her love interest in the video. Dolan elaborated "She was just like, 'I'm concerned with the reality of the tensions between authorities and the black community, and I want to send a message out there.'" Dolan contacted Wilds via Skype and explained the concept for the video, which Wilds agreed to take part in. During the filming, both Adele and Wilds were asked to improvise and "tap into" their past relationships to convey the correct emotions. Dolan also filmed shots of both Adele and Wilds having conversations and laughing. The sepia toned video shows Adele performing the song in a small house and outside in a wooded forest, intercut with scenes of her making a tearful phone call and flashbacks to a past relationship with Wilds' character.

The flip phone used by Adele in the video was widely commented upon due to being of a retro style. Dolan replied to the remarks by saying: "It makes me uncomfortable filming iPhones because I feel like I'm shooting a commercial. Those things: iPhones, laptops, all those elements, to me, they bring me back to reality: That's not what you want. You want to get out of your own life; you want to enter someone else's; you want to travel somewhere; you want to be told a story. I'm realizing maybe I've been more distracting than anything else with that flip phone, but it wasn't intentional!"

The music video for "Hello" broke the previous Vevo Record by achieving over 27.7 million views within its first 24 hours of release. This record was previously held by the music video for Taylor Swift's "Bad Blood", which had amassed 20.1 million views in its first 24 hours. Later, the video continued to break Miley Cyrus' "Wrecking Ball" Vevo record for the fastest video to reach 100 million views in five days. The phrase "Adele hello" was also the top YouTube search term of Friday and Saturday, and on average the video was getting one million views per hour during the first two days, peaking at 1.6 million in a single hour, beating the peak view rate of the trailer for Star Wars: The Force Awakens, which peaked at 1.2 million views per hour. The video was parodied in a Thanksgiving-themed sketch on Saturday Night Live.

The video peaked as the 30th most viewed video on YouTube in 2020, having earned over 2.8 billion views, as well as the 26th most liked video on the platform in 2015, with over 17 million likes. The video holds the Guinness world record for the "fastest time for a video to reach 1 billion views" in 87 days.

== Live performances ==
Adele performed "Hello" live for the first time for a BBC one-hour-long special performance, Adele at the BBC, which was recorded on 2 November 2015 and was broadcast on BBC One on 20 November 2015. She also performed the song at the 17th NRJ Music Awards on 7 November 2015, at Radio City Music Hall in New York City on 17 November 2015 as her opening number (Adele Live in New York City), and on Saturday Night Live on 21 November 2015. On 23 November 2015, after appearing on The Tonight Show Starring Jimmy Fallon, Adele recorded the song with Fallon and his house band, The Roots, playing classroom instruments. The version was broadcast on the show the following night. On 13 December 2015 Adele performed "Hello" on the X Factor live final at The SSE Arena, Wembley.

== Cover versions ==
- The American singer Demi Lovato covered "Hello" at the 2015 106.1 KISS FM Fall Ball, which was held in the city of Seattle, Washington on 14 November 2015. Their rendition was met with critical acclaim. It eventually received a nomination for "Best Cover Song" at the 3rd iHeartRadio Music Awards in 2016.
- In December 2015, Washington, D.C.–based go-go band Backyard Band released a cover version of the song, which has become widely popular in the area since its release.
- In December 2015, Claudio Sanchez of American progressive metal band Coheed & Cambria posted an acoustic cover on YouTube. The cover was described by critics as "haunting".
- During New Year's Eve 2015, Canadian singer Celine Dion covered "Hello" at her residency show in Las Vegas.
- The operatic pop group Il Divo released a Spanish language version of the song in 2018 that its members titled "Hola", and it was included in the group's album Timeless while a related music video also came out.
- On June 24, 2022, Canadian singer-songwriter Avril Lavigne released a cover of the song for her Spotify Singles release.
- On 24 July 2021, Torn Between Two Worlds, a Swedish-British symphonic metal band, released their version as a download and later on 3 June 2022 on the EP "As If We Never Existed".
- In July 2024, "Weird Al" Yankovic included the song in his polka medley "Polkamania!".

== Credits and personnel ==
Personnel

- Lead vocals, backing vocals, drums – Adele
- Songwriting, bass, drums, guitar, piano, and keyboards – Greg Kurstin
- Mixing – Tom Elmhirst
- Engineering – Julian Burg
- Mastering – Randy Merrill
- Additional instruments – Emile Haynie

== Charts ==
=== Weekly charts ===
2010s weekly chart performance for "Hello"
Chart (2015–2016)	Peak position
Australia (ARIA)	1
Austria (Ö3 Austria Top 40)	1
Belgium (Ultratop 50 Flanders)	1
Belgium (Ultratop 50 Wallonia)	1
Brazil Hot 100 Airplay (Billboard Brasil)	1
Canada Hot 100 (Billboard)	1
Canada AC (Billboard)	1
Canada CHR/Top 40 (Billboard)	1
Canada Hot AC (Billboard)	1
Chile Airplay (Monitor Latino)	9
Czech Republic Airplay (ČNS IFPI)	1
Czech Republic Singles Digital (ČNS IFPI)	1
Croatia International Airplay (Top lista)	1
Denmark (Tracklisten)	1
Euro Digital Song Sales (Billboard)	1
Finland (Suomen virallinen lista)	1
France (SNEP)	1
Germany (GfK)	1
Greece Airplay (IFPI)	1
Greece Digital (Billboard)	1
Guatemala Airplay (Monitor Latino)	2
Hong Kong (HKRIA)	2
Hungary (Dance Top 40)	1
Hungary (Rádiós Top 40)	1
Hungary (Single Top 40)	1
Hungary (Stream Top 40)	1
Ireland (IRMA)	1
Israel International Airplay (Media Forest)	1
Italy (FIMI)	1
Japan Hot 100 (Billboard)	17
Japan Hot Overseas (Billboard)	1
Lebanon (Lebanese Top 20)	1
Luxembourg Digital Song Sales (Billboard)	1
Mexico Airplay (Billboard)	1
Mexico Airplay (Monitor Latino)	1
Netherlands (Dutch Top 40)	1
Netherlands (Single Top 100)	1
New Zealand (Recorded Music NZ)	1
Norway (VG-lista)	1
Poland Airplay (ZPAV)	1
Portugal (AFP)	3
Romania Airplay (Media Forest)	1
Russia Airplay (TopHit)	16
Scottish Singles Sales (Official Charts)	1
Slovakia Airplay (ČNS IFPI)	1
Slovakia Singles Digital (ČNS IFPI)	1
Slovenia Airplay (SloTop50)	1
South Africa Airplay (EMA)	1
South Korea Digital (Gaon)	3
South Korea International (Gaon)	1
Spain (Promusicae)	1
Sweden (Sverigetopplistan)	1
Switzerland (Schweizer Hitparade)	1
Turkey International Airplay (MusicTopTR)	1
UK Singles (Official Charts)	1
UK Indie (Official Charts)	1
Ukraine Airplay (TopHit)	6
US Billboard Hot 100	1
US Adult Contemporary (Billboard)	1
US Adult Pop Airplay (Billboard)	1
US Dance Club Songs (Billboard)	1
US Adult Alternative Songs (Billboard)	1
US Adult R&B Songs (Billboard)	1
US Dance Airplay (Billboard)	1
US Latin Pop Airplay (Billboard)	14
US Pop Airplay (Billboard)	1
US R&B/Hip-Hop Airplay (Billboard)	10
US Rhythmic Airplay (Billboard)	10
US Rock & Alternative Airplay (Billboard)	26
Venezuela English (Record Report)	1

2020s weekly chart performance for "Hello"
Chart (2021)	Peak position
Global 200 (Billboard)	71
South Africa Streaming (RISA)	95

=== Year-end charts ===
Chart (2015)	Position
Australia (ARIA)	5
Austria (Ö3 Austria Top 40)	5
Belgium (Ultratop Flanders)	5
Belgium (Ultratop Wallonia)	14
Canada (Canadian Hot 100)	25
Denmark (Tracklisten)	25
France (SNEP)	14
Germany (Official German Charts)	7
Hungary (Dance Top 40)	61
Hungary (Rádiós Top 40)	51
Hungary (Single Top 40)	6
Ireland (IRMA)	7
Israel (Media Forest)	17
Italy (FIMI)	18
Netherlands (Dutch Top 40)	48
Netherlands (Single Top 100)	18
New Zealand (Recorded Music NZ)	13
South Korea International (Gaon)	6
Spain (PROMUSICAE)	47
Sweden (Sverigetopplistan)	28
Switzerland (Schweizer Hitparade)	6
Taiwan (Hito Radio)	5
UK Singles (Official Charts Company)	6
US Billboard Hot 100	35
US Adult Contemporary (Billboard)	39

Chart (2016)	Position
Argentina (Monitor Latino)	60
Australia (ARIA)	42
Austria (Ö3 Austria Top 40)	69
Belgium (Ultratop Flanders)	38
Belgium (Ultratop Wallonia)	16
Brazil (Brasil Hot 100)	7
Canada (Canadian Hot 100)	9
CIS (Tophit)	28
Denmark (Tracklisten)	33
France (SNEP)	112
Germany (Official German Charts)	70
Hungary (Dance Top 40)	12
Hungary (Single Top 40)	21
Israel (Media Forest)	13
Netherlands (Dutch Top 40)	54
Netherlands (Single Top 100)	57
New Zealand (Recorded Music NZ)	27
Slovenia (SloTop50)	6
Russia Airplay (Tophit)	34
Spain (PROMUSICAE)	54
South Korea Digital Chart (Gaon)	76
South Korea International (Gaon)	3
Sweden (Sverigetopplistan)	33
Switzerland (Schweizer Hitparade)	5
Ukraine Airplay (Tophit)	36
UK Singles (Official Charts Company)	48
US Billboard Hot 100	7
US Radio Songs (Billboard)	8
US Adult Contemporary (Billboard)	4
US Adult Top 40 (Billboard)	11
US Dance Club Songs (Billboard)	22
US Dance/Mix Show Airplay (Billboard)	14
US Mainstream Top 40 (Billboard)	18
US AC (Mediabase)	1
US Hot AC (Mediabase)	9
US Top 40 (Mediabase)	22

=== Decade-end charts ===
Chart (2010–2019)	Position
Australia (ARIA)	28
Germany (Official German Charts)	28
UK Singles (Official Charts Company)	25
US Billboard Hot 100	52

== Certifications and sales ==
Certifications and sales for "Hello"
Region	Certification	Certified units/sales
Australia (ARIA)	7× Platinum	490,000^{‡}
Belgium (BRMA)	3× Platinum	60,000^{‡}
Brazil (Pro-Música Brasil)	3× Diamond	750,000^{‡}
Canada (Music Canada)	Diamond	800,000^{‡}
Denmark (IFPI Danmark)	4× Platinum	360,000^{‡}
Germany (BVMI)	Platinum	400,000^{‡}
Italy (FIMI)	6× Platinum	300,000^{‡}
Mexico (AMPROFON)	Diamond+Gold	330,000^{‡}
New Zealand (RMNZ)	7× Platinum	210,000^{‡}
Norway (IFPI Norway)	6× Platinum	360,000^{‡}
Spain (Promusicae)	3× Platinum	120,000^{‡}
South Korea (KMCA)	Platinum	2,500,000^{*}
Switzerland (IFPI Switzerland)	Platinum	30,000^{‡}
United Kingdom (BPI)	5× Platinum	3,000,000^{‡}
United States (RIAA)	7× Platinum	7,000,000^{‡}
Streaming
South Korea (KMCA)	Platinum	100,000,000^{†}
^{*} Sales figures based on certification alone.^{‡} Sales+streaming figures based on certification alone.^{†} Streaming-only figures based on certification alone.

== Radio and release history ==
Region	Date	Format	Label
Worldwide	23 October 2015	Digital download	XL
Italy	23 October 2015	Mainstream radio	XL
United States	26 October 2015	Hot AC radio	Columbia
United Kingdom	26 October 2015	Mainstream radio	Columbia
United States	27 October 2015	Mainstream radio	Columbia

== See also ==
- List of Billboard Hot 100 number-one singles of 2015
- List of most streamed songs on Spotify
- List of most-viewed YouTube videos
