= Adele Live in New York City =

- Directed by: Beth McCarthy-Miller
- Presented by: Jimmy Fallon
- Starring: Adele
- Original language: English

Production
- Executive producers: Adele; Lorne Michaels; Jonathan Dickins
- Producers: Matt Roberts; Erin David; Rhys Thomas; Lindsay Shookus; Erik Kenward
- Production location: Radio City Music Hall
- Running time: 1 hour 4 minutes

Original release
- Network: NBC
- Release: December 14, 2015

Adele: Live in New York City was Adele's one-night-only show at Radio City Music Hall, which took place on November 17, 2015. The show was directed by Beth McCarthy-Miller and broadcast on NBC on December 14, 2015. Jimmy Fallon served as the host, while Adele, Jonathan Dickins, and Lorne Michaels served as its executive producers.

== Songs performed ==
1. "Hello"
2. "All I Ask"
3. "Set Fire to the Rain"
4. "Skyfall"
5. "Someone like You"
6. "Million Years Ago"
7. "When We Were Young"
8. "Rolling in the Deep"

== Songs not included in the original network broadcast ==
1. "Water Under the Bridge"
2. "One and Only"
3. "Hometown Glory"
4. "Chasing Pavements"
5. "Daydreamer"

== Reception ==
Adele Live in New York City averaged 11.3 million viewers and a 3.0 rating among adults 18–49, which represents the highest rating among adults for a prime-time concert special since the Eagles' 2005 Farewell Tour. The special also retained the viewership of The Voice lead-in, which was the highest-rated series of the night, with an average 3.2 rating in the key demo.

== Awards and nominations ==
Award	Date of ceremony	Category	Recipient(s)	Result	Ref.
Primetime Creative Arts Emmy Awards	September 10, 2016	Outstanding Variety Special (Pre-Recorded)	Lorne Michaels, Adele and Jonathan Dickins, executive producers; Paul Chagares and Ken Aymong, supervising producers; Lindsay Shookus and Erik Kenward, producers; Matt Roberts, Erin David and Rhys Thomas, produced by	Nominated	
Primetime Creative Arts Emmy Awards	September 10, 2016	Outstanding Directing for a Variety Special	Beth McCarthy-Miller	Nominated	
Primetime Creative Arts Emmy Awards	September 10, 2016	Outstanding Lighting Design / Lighting Direction for a Variety Special	Allen Branton, Patrick Woodroffe, Tom Beck, Eric Marchwinski, George Gountas	Nominated	
Primetime Creative Arts Emmy Awards	September 10, 2016	Outstanding Technical Direction, Camerawork, Video Control for a Special	Steve Cimino, Jerry Cancél, Joseph DeBonis, Eric Eisenstein, Rick Fox, Rich Freedman, Chuck Goslin, Ernie Jew, Jay Kulick, Jeff Latonero, Brian Phraner, John Pinto, Tim Quigley, Mark Renaudin, Carlos Rios, Claus Stuhlweissenburg, William Steinberg, Susan Noll, Tami Ruddy	Nominated	

== See also ==
- 2015 in American television
- Adele at the BBC
- Adele One Night Only
