= List of songs recorded by Adele =

Songs recorded by English singer-songwriter

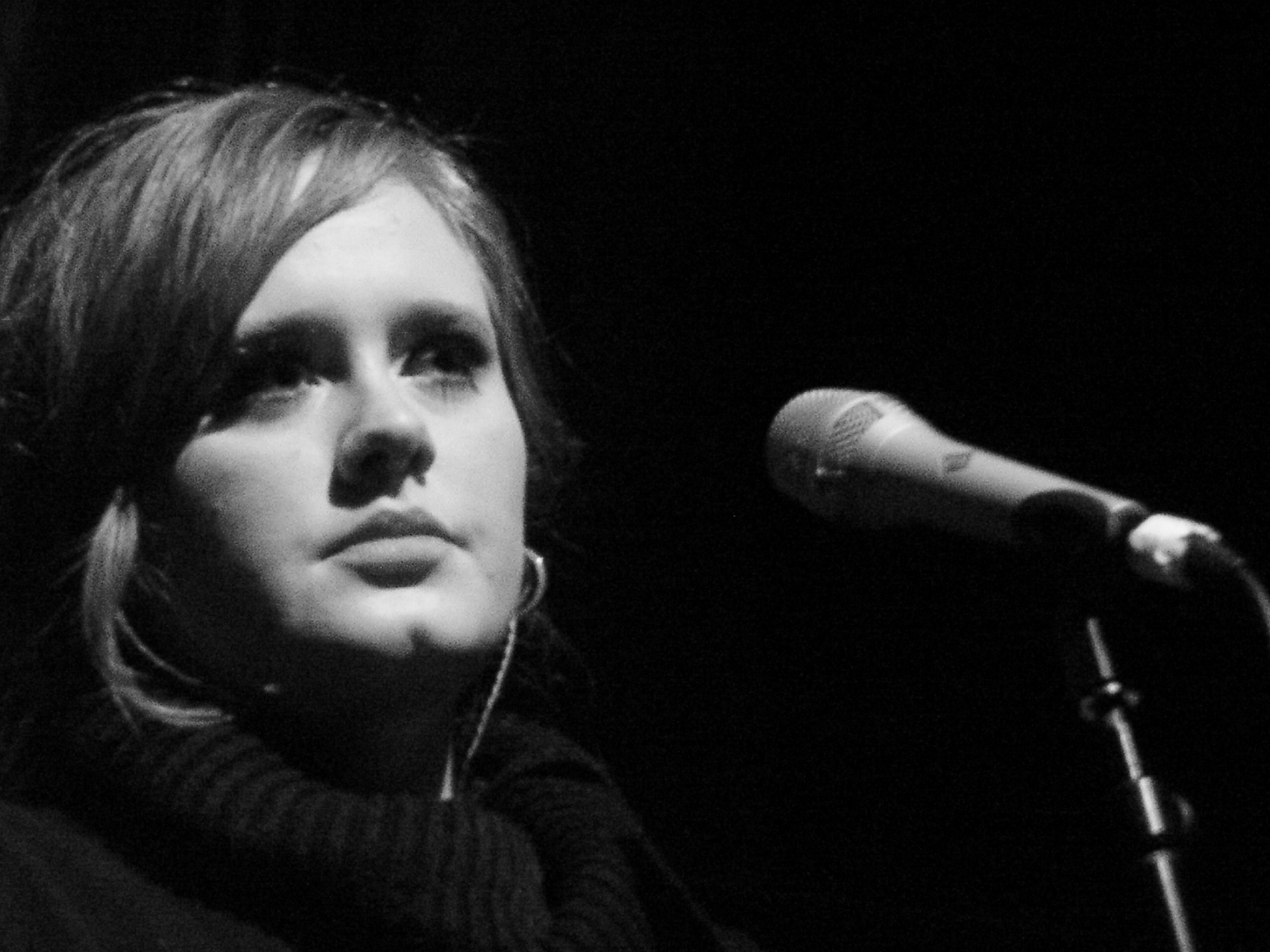
Adele has recorded songs for four studio albums, entitled 19, 21, 25, and 30.

Adele is an English singer-songwriter. After signing a contract with record label XL Recordings in September 2006, Adele began to work on her debut studio album, 19, which was ultimately released in 2008. At this time, the singer contributed guest vocals on the song "My Yvonne" for Jack Peñate's debut studio album Matinée (2007). The first single released from 19 was "Chasing Pavements", which Adele wrote in collaboration with Eg White. They co-wrote two other songs for the album: "Melt My Heart to Stone" and "Tired". She also collaborated with Sacha Skarbek on the single "Cold Shoulder" and recorded a cover version of Bob Dylan's "Make You Feel My Love". However, most of the songs were written solely by Adele, including "Best for Last", "Crazy for You", "First Love", and "My Same", as well as her debut single, "Hometown Glory".

Adele appeared as a featured artist on another song by Peñate, entitled "Every Glance", from his second studio album, Everything Is New, and on Daniel Merriweather's "Water and a Flame" from his second studio album, Love & War, both released in 2009. Adele released her second studio album 21 in 2011. In addition to reuniting with writers with whom she had previously worked, the singer collaborated with several new writers and producers. The album's lead single, "Rolling in the Deep", was co-written by Adele and Paul Epworth. It has since been certified eight-times platinum by the Recording Industry Association of America (RIAA) and won two awards at the 54th Grammy Awards: Record of the Year and Song of the Year. Adele and Epworth also wrote "He Won't Go" and "I'll Be Waiting". Adele collaborated with Dan Wilson on the album's second single, "Someone Like You". She co-wrote with Fraser T Smith on "Set Fire to the Rain" and with Ryan Tedder on "Rumour Has It" and "Turning Tables". She reunited with White on the song "Take It All". Adele released "Skyfall" in October 2012, a song co-written with Epworth for the James Bond film of the same name. Her third album, 25, was released in 2015. Adele co-wrote its songs "I Miss You" and "Sweetest Devotion" with Epworth and co-wrote "Hello", "Million Years Ago", and "Water Under the Bridge" with Greg Kurstin.

In 2021, Adele announced her fourth studio album 30, scheduled for release on 19 November 2021. The album release was preceded with the single "Easy on Me", co-written with Greg Kurstin.

== Songs ==
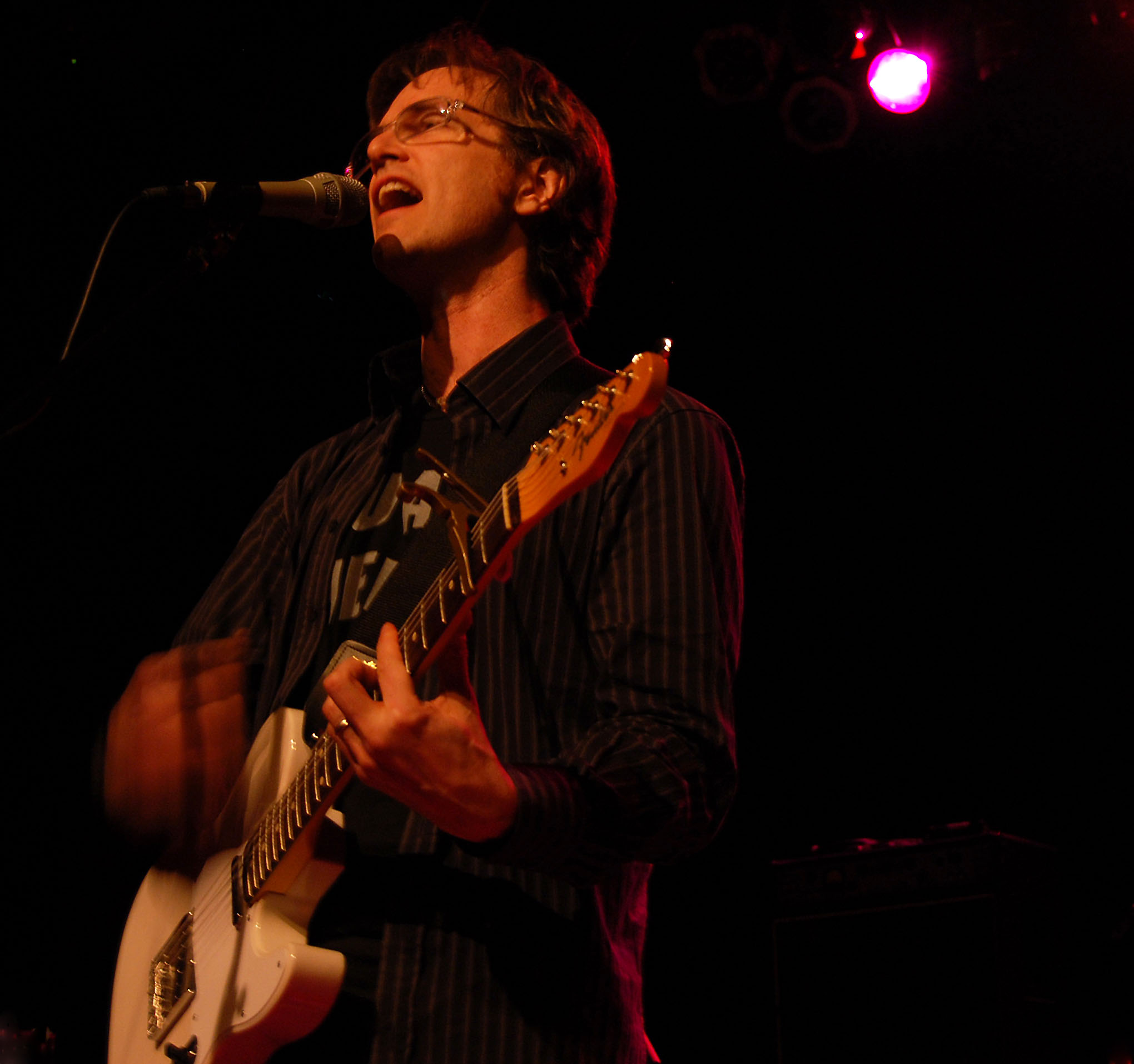
Dan Wilson co-wrote the songs "Don't You Remember", "One and Only" and "Someone Like You" with Adele for her second studio album 21.

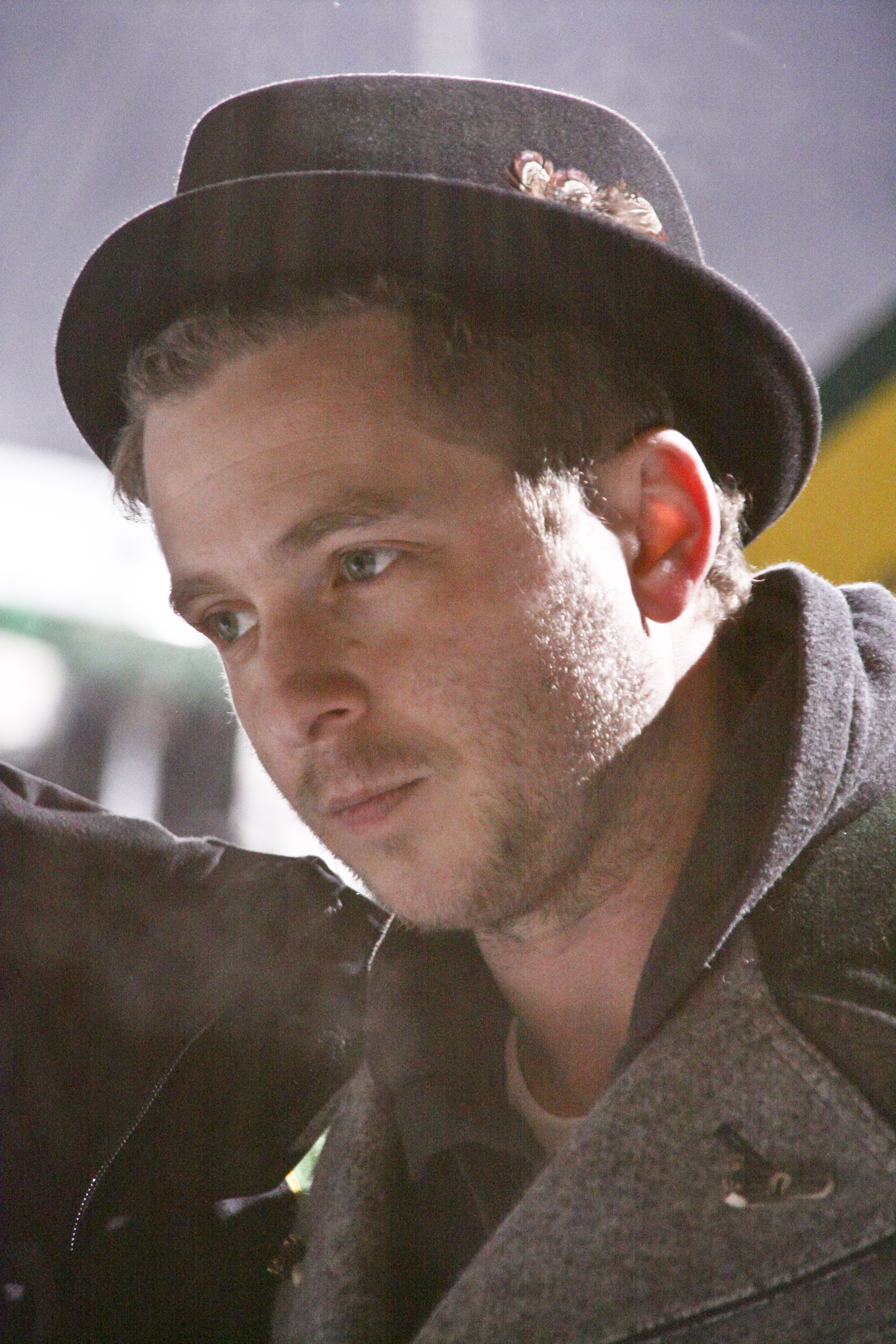
Ryan Tedder co-wrote the songs "Rumour Has It" and "Turning Tables" with Adele for 21 and "Remedy" for 25.

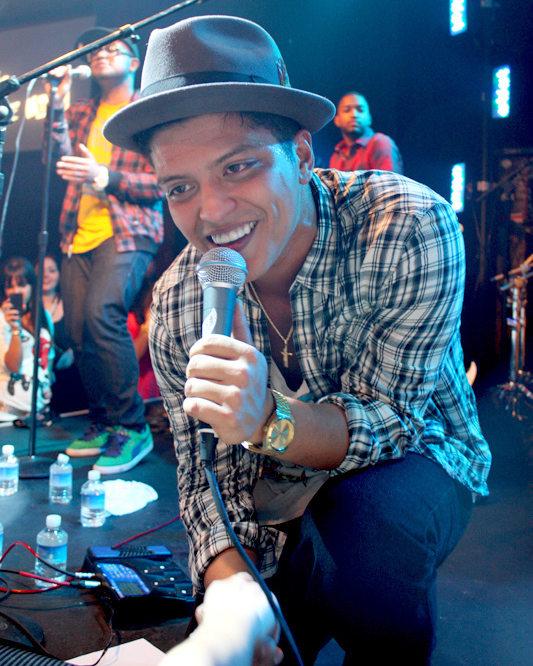
Bruno Mars co-wrote "All I Ask".

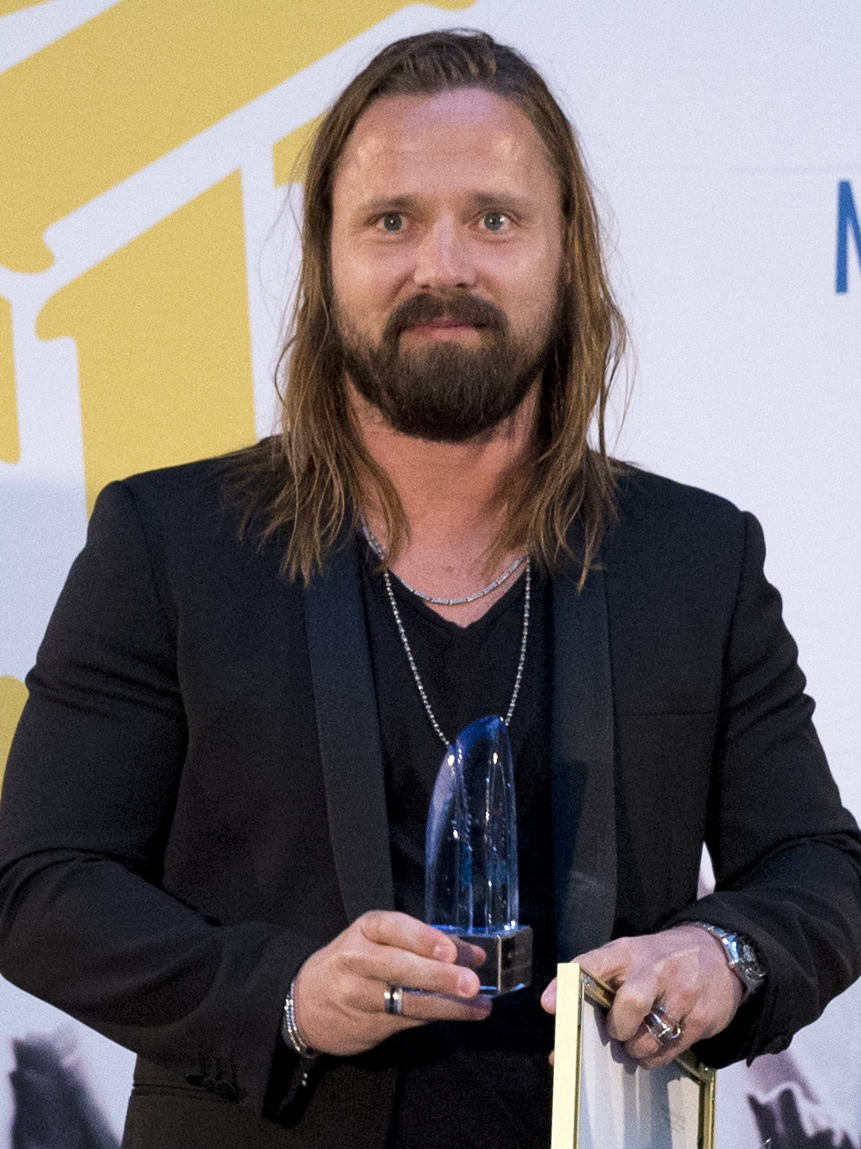
Max Martin co-wrote "Send My Love (To Your New Lover)".

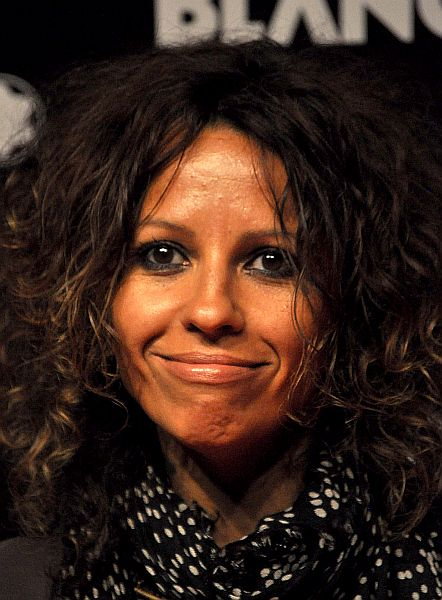
Linda Perry co-wrote "Can't Let Go".

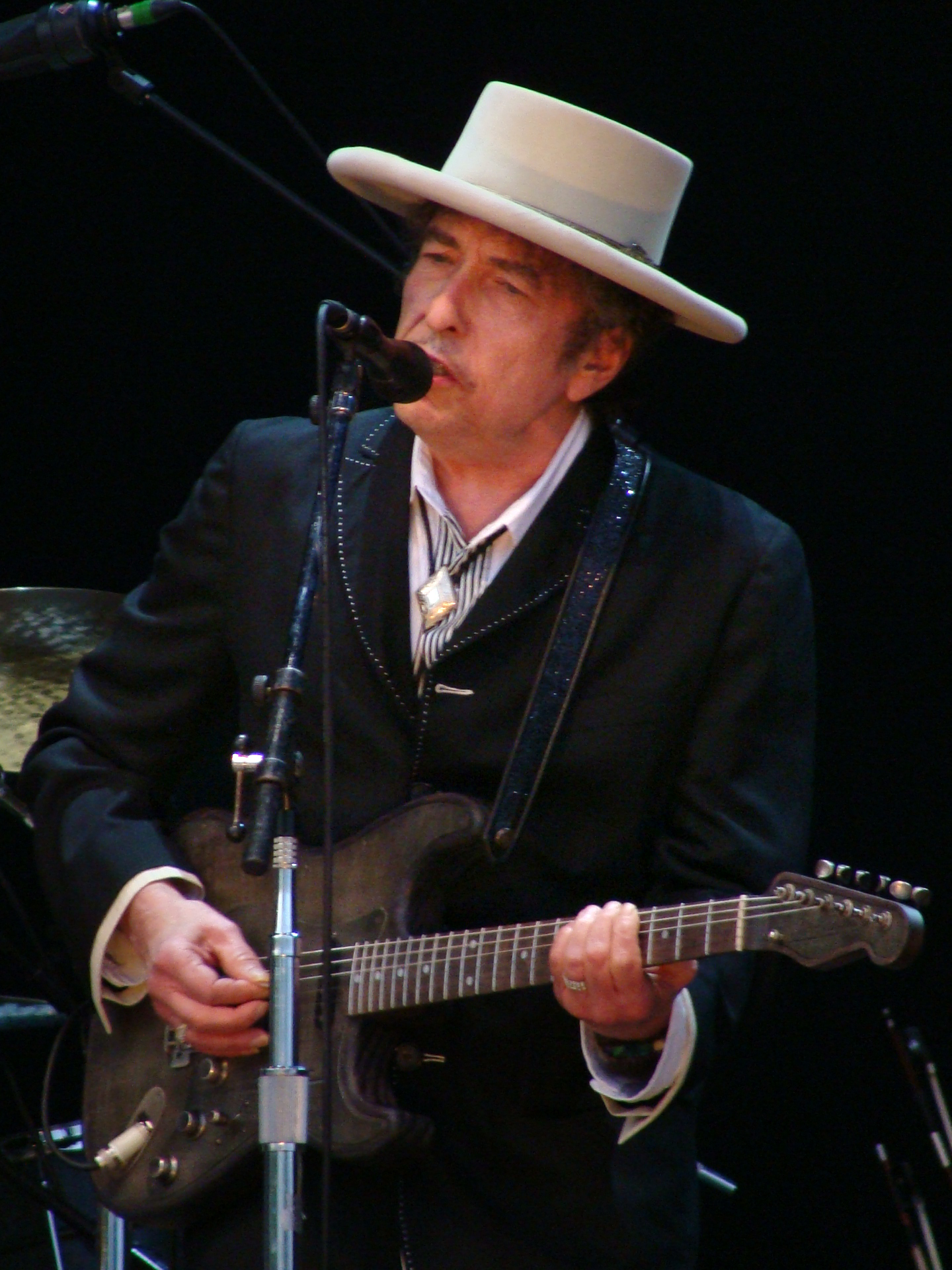
Adele has covered Bob Dylan's "Make You Feel My Love".

Key
‡	Indicates songs written solely by Adele
#	Indicates songs with background vocals by Adele

Song	Artist(s)	Writer(s)	Album	Year	Ref.
"All I Ask"	Adele	Adele Adkins; Bruno Mars; Philip Lawrence; Christopher "Brody" Brown	25	2015	
"All Night Parking"	Adele with Erroll Garner	Adele Adkins; Erroll Garner	30	2021	
"Be Divine"	Ricsta featuring Adele	Ricsta	Non-album single	2006	
"Best for Last"	Adele	Adele Adkins ‡	19	2008	
"Can I Get It"	Adele	Adele Adkins; Max Martin; Karl Johan Schuster	30	2021	
"Can't Be Together"	Adele	Adele Adkins; Greg Kurstin	30; Target deluxe edition	2021	
"Can't Let Go"	Adele	Adele Adkins; Linda Perry	25; Target and Japanese edition	2015	
"Chasing Pavements"	Adele	Adele Adkins; Eg White	19	2008	
"Cold Shoulder"	Adele	Adele Adkins ‡	19	2008	
"Crazy for You"	Adele	Adele Adkins ‡	19	2008	
"Cry Your Heart Out"	Adele	Adele Adkins; Greg Kurstin	30	2021	
"Daydreamer"	Adele	Adele Adkins ‡	19	2008	
"Don't You Remember"	Adele	Adele Adkins; Dan Wilson	21	2011	
"Every Glance" #	Jack Peñate	Jack Peñate; Paul Epworth	Everything Is New	2009	
"Easy on Me"	Adele	Adele Adkins; Greg Kurstin	30	2021	
"Easy on Me" (feature version)	Adele featuring Chris Stapleton	Adele Adkins; Greg Kurstin	30; Target deluxe edition	2021	
"First Love"	Adele	Adele Adkins ‡	19	2008	
"Fool That I Am" (cover)	Adele	Floyd Hunt	iTunes Live from SoHo	2009	
"He Won't Go"	Adele	Adele Adkins; Paul Epworth	21	2011	
"Hello"	Adele	Adele Adkins; Greg Kurstin	25	2015	
"Hiding My Heart" (cover)	Adele	Tim Hanseroth	21; Limited edition	2011	
"Hold On"	Adele	Adele Adkins; Dean Josiah Cover	30	2021	
"Hometown Glory" †	Adele	Adele Adkins ‡	19	2008	
"I Can't Make You Love Me" (cover)	Adele	Mike Reid; Allen Shamblin	iTunes Festival: London 2011	2011	
"I Drink Wine"	Adele	Adele Adkins; Greg Kurstin	30	2021	
"I Found a Boy"	Adele	Adele Adkins ‡	21; Japanese edition	2011	
"I Miss You"	Adele	Adele Adkins; Paul Epworth	25	2015	
"I'll Be Waiting"	Adele	Adele Adkins; Paul Epworth	21	2011	
"If It Hadn't Been For Love"(cover)	Adele	Chris Stapleton; Michael Henderson	21; Limited edition	2011	
"Lay Me Down"	Adele	Adele Adkins; Tobias Jesso Jr.	25; Target and Japanese edition	2015	
"Love in the Dark"	Adele	Adele Adkins; Samuel Dixon	25	2015	
"Love Is a Game"	Adele	Adele Adkins; Dean Josiah Cover	30	2021	
"Lovesong" (cover)	Adele	Boris Williams; Lol Tolhurst; Porl Thompson; Robert Smith; Roger O'Donnell; Simon Gallup	21	2011	
"Make You Feel My Love" (cover)	Adele	Bob Dylan	19	2008	
"Many Shades of Black"	The Raconteurs with Adele	Brendan Benson; Jack White	Consolers of the Lonely and 19 Expanded edition	2008	
"Melt My Heart to Stone"	Adele	Adele Adkins; Eg White	19	2008	
"Million Years Ago"	Adele	Adele Adkins; Greg Kurstin	25	2015	
"My Little Love"	Adele	Adele Adkins; Greg Kurstin	30	2021	
"My Same"	Adele	Adele Adkins ‡	19	2008	
"My Yvonne" #	Jack Peñate	Jack Peñate	Matinée	2007	
"Need You Now" (cover)	Adele featuring Darius Rucker	Dave Haywood; Charles Kelley; Hillary Scott; Josh Kear	21; Deluxe edition	2011	
"Now and Then"	Adele	Adele Adkins ‡	19; Japanese and New Zealanders edition	2008	
"Oh My God"	Adele	Adele Adkins; Greg Kurstin	30	2021	
"One and Only"	Adele	Adele Adkins; Dan Wilson; Greg Wells	21	2011	
"Painting Pictures"	Adele	Adele Adkins ‡	19; Japanese and New Zealanders edition	2008	
"Remedy"	Adele	Adele Adkins; Ryan Tedder	25	2015	
"Right as Rain"	Adele	Adele Adkins; Clay Holley; Jeff Silverman; Leon Michels; Nick Movshon	19	2008	
"River Lea"	Adele	Adele Adkins; Brian Joseph Burton	25	2015	
"Rolling in the Deep"	Adele	Adele Adkins; Paul Epworth	21	2010	
"Rumour Has It"	Adele	Adele Adkins; Ryan Tedder	21	2011	
"Send My Love (To Your New Lover)"	Adele	Adele Adkins; Karl Johan Schuster; Max Martin	25	2015	
"Set Fire to the Rain"	Adele	Adele Adkins; Fraser T Smith	21	2011	
"Skyfall"	Adele	Adele Adkins; Paul Epworth	Non-album single	2012	
"Someone Like You"	Adele	Adele Adkins; Dan Wilson	21	2011	
"Strangers by Nature"	Adele	Adele Adkins; Ludwig Göransson	30	2021	
"Sweetest Devotion"	Adele	Adele Adkins; Paul Epworth	25	2015	
"Take It All"	Adele	Adele Adkins; Eg White	21	2011	
"Tired"	Adele	Adele Adkins; Eg White	19	2008	
"That's It, I Quit, I'm Moving On" (cover)	Adele	Del Serino; Roy Alfred	19; Japanese and New Zealanders edition	2008	
"To Be Loved"	Adele	Adele Adkins; Tobias Jesso Jr.	30	2021	
"Turning Tables"	Adele	Adele Adkins; Ryan Tedder	21	2011	
"Water and a Flame"	Daniel Merriweather featuring Adele	Daniel Merriweather	Love & War	2009	
"Water Under the Bridge"	Adele	Adele Adkins; Greg Kurstin	25	2015	
"When We Were Young"	Adele	Adele Adkins; Tobias Jesso Jr.	25	2015	
"Why Do You Love Me"	Adele	Adele Adkins; Rick Nowels	25; Target and Japanese edition	2015	
"Wild Wild West"	Adele	Adele Adkins; Ludwig Göransson	30; Target deluxe edition	2021	
"Woman Like Me"	Adele	Adele Adkins; Dean Josiah Cover	30	2021	
