= To Be Loved (disambiguation) =

To Be Loved is a 2013 album by Michael Bublé.

To Be Loved may also refer to:

- "...To Be Loved", a song by Papa Roach from the album The Paramour Sessions (2006)
- "To Be Loved" (Adele song), from the album 30 (2021)
- To Be Loved, a 2007 album by Ian Moore
- "To Be Loved", a song by Westlife from the album World of Our Own (2001)
- "To Be Loved", a song by Train from the album California 37 (2012)
- "To Be Loved", a song by Jackie Wilson (1958)

== See also ==
- "2 Be Loved (Am I Ready), by Lizzo, 2022
- "2 B Loved", a song by Janet Jackson from the album Unbreakable (2015)
