= To Be Loved (Adele song) =

2021 song by Adele

Song by Adele

from the album 30
- Released: 19 November 2021
- Studio: Will's Grandma's House (California)
- Genre: Traditional pop
- Length: 6:43
- Label: Columbia
- Songwriters: Adele Adkins; Tobias Jesso Jr.
- Producers: Tobias Jesso Jr.; Shawn Everett

Lyric video
- "To Be Loved" on YouTube

"To Be Loved" is a song by the English singer Adele from her fourth studio album, 30 (2021). She wrote it with Tobias Jesso Jr., who produced it with Shawn Everett. The song became available as the album's 11th track on 19 November 2021, when it was released by Columbia Records. A torch ballad, "To Be Loved" has piano instrumentation and sets the singer's echoey vocals over minimalistic production. The song is about the sacrifices one must make upon falling in love and addresses Adele's divorce from Simon Konecki, attempting to explain to her son why their marriage did not succeed.

"To Be Loved" received universal acclaim from music critics, who highlighted Adele's vocal performance as her all-time best. Several publications included it in their list of the best songs of 2021. It reached the top 40 in Australia, Canada, Sweden, and the United States and entered the charts in some other countries. Adele did not perform "To Be Loved" live but shared a clip of her performing it, accompanied by a piano, on social media.

== Background and promotion ==
Adele began working on her fourth studio album by 2018. She filed for divorce from her husband Simon Konecki in September 2019, which inspired the album. After experiencing anxiety, Adele undertook therapy sessions and mended her estranged relationship with her father. The years following the divorce plagued her, especially due to the effect it had on her son. Adele decided to have regular conversations with him, which she recorded following advice from her therapist. These conversations inspired her return to the studio and the album took shape as a body of work that would explain to her son why she left his father. Adele released "Easy on Me" as the lead single from the album, entitled 30, on 14 October 2021.

Adele wrote the song "To Be Loved" with Tobias Jesso Jr., who had worked on two songs for her third studio album 25 (2015)—"When We Were Young" and "Lay Me Down". They finished an early version of "To Be Loved" in a Brentwood house without any studio equipment, with Adele recording vocal takes on her MacBook. Shawn Everett placed microphones and blankets all over the room and the piano for the final recording; Jesso Jr. recounted: "It was just us playing live and together. And so in the piano tracks, you can hear vocals and in the vocals, you can hear the piano." "To Be Loved" was among the songs Adele played for her father shortly prior to his dying from cancer, after which they both cried. She said about its inspiration: "My main goal in life is to be loved in love. And so I wanted to play it to my dad being like, 'You're the reason I haven't done that yet,' he was the reason I haven't fully accessed what it is to be in a loving relationship with somebody." While creating "To Be Loved", Adele envisioned playing it for her son when he would be in his 30s. The song was announced as the 11th track on the album on 1 November 2021.

On 17 November, Adele posted a clip of her performing "To Be Loved" in her living room, accompanied by a piano. It was well-received on the Internet. Rolling Stone's Althea Legaspi described the rendition as "devastatingly gorgeous", and Billboard's Heran Mamo called it "casually soul-crushing". As her voice grew louder, the sound in the clip became increasingly distorted, which led Variety's Chris Willman and The Guardian Nigeria's Oreoritse Tariemi to comment that "it sound[ed] like it was about to break her phone". About the prospect of performing the song again in the future, Adele stated, "I don't think I'll do it live. I can't even listen to it, so no. I have to leave the room, I get really upset, I get really choked up."

"To Be Loved" became available for digital download on 30, which was released two days later. In the United Kingdom, it debuted at number 12 on the Official Audio Streaming Chart. The song charted at number 32 on the US Billboard Hot 100. It peaked at number 16 on the Canadian Hot 100. In Australia, "To Be Loved" reached number 25. On the Billboard Global 200, the song peaked at number 19. It reached national record charts, at number 26 in Sweden, number 48 in Portugal, and number 116 in France.

== Composition ==
"To Be Loved"
Adele's voice cracks as she delivers prolonged vocals over the piano instrumentation of "To Be Loved" (sampled), which switch between a vibrato and vocal growls, and drew critical praise.

"To Be Loved" is six minutes and 43 seconds long. Jesso Jr. played the piano, and produced the song with Everett, who recorded it at Will's Grandma's House in California and engineered it with Ivan Wayman. Randy Merrill mastered it at Sterling Sound in New Jersey, and Matt Scatchell and Tom Elmhirst mixed it at Electric Lady Studios in New York.

"To Be Loved" is a torch ballad with minimalistic piano instrumentation. The song progresses at a slow tempo, which The Guardian's Alexis Petridis compared to a "12-mile tailback on the M62". It opens with a powerful and unabashed piano line. "To Be Loved" sets Adele's echoey vocals over bare and exposed production, which The A.V. Club's Gabrielle Sanchez thought sounded like "she's singing on an empty stage". She employs a chest belt that switches between a vibrato and vocal growls, spanning a mezzo-soprano vocal range. Adele's voice cracks during the bridge. She delivers the song's highest note with the words "I tried". The Telegraph's Neil McCormick described its climax as a testimonial epilogue gigantic enough to "blow out her vocal cords".

Adele addresses her divorce from Konecki on "To Be Loved", explaining to her son why her marriage did not succeed, a theme also explored on 30's third track "My Little Love". The song has lyrics about persevering in a relationship with the sole reason of wanting to be loved. She describes the price one has to pay upon completely and unapologetically falling in love with someone else. Adele justifies the separation, as she believes the marriage deprived her of the true love she had been seeking her whole life, and parts ways in hopes that a greater love is possible. On "To Be Loved", she confronts what it means to share her life, attempting to gauge where her trust and dependence transformed into self-erasure: "To be loved and love at the highest count/Means to lose all the things I can't live without," and states, "I can't live a lie". Slant Magazine's Eric Mason described the song as "the internal monologue of a Broadway actor who's been unexpectedly left alone on stage".

== Critical reception ==
"To Be Loved" received rave reviews from music critics. Pitchfork's Gio Santiago designated it as "Best New Track" and named the song an "off-the-cuff masterpiece" and thought Adele reached new levels of vulnerability with it. He likened it to an 11 o'clock number and stated that it placed determinedly among a collection of heartbreak songs. Cat Sposato of NPR wrote that "To Be Loved" was Adele at her prime vocally and believed she delivered her final vocals on it with extenuating passion that might be strong enough to cure her bygone lesions. Writing for The Observer, Kitty Empire named the song 30's defining track as well as "the Burj Khalifa of piano ballads". Jason Lipshutz of Billboard deemed it the most dexterous moment of the album and the "most mesmerizing powerhouse vocal performance" of Adele's career. Critics compared Adele's vocal performance on "To Be Loved" to Whitney Houston. Writing for Clash, Robin Murray thought her prolonged and dulcet vocal lines drew full strength from her throat and further compared them to vocalised pirouettes performed by Houston during her prime.

McCormick described "To Be Loved" as an eye-catching ballad and opined that its final vocals were almost flabbergasting to hear, the crude emotion achieving something "beyond musical finesse". Sanchez thought Adele was at her pinnacle on the song, her "raw, powerhouse performance" likely to induce an impulse to applaud from the listener. Pitchfork's Jillian Mapes opined that it will go down in history and saw her do what she is best at: "creat[ing] a world of feeling out of little more than her voice and then tak[ing] you to the brink". Kyle Mullin of Exclaim! thought the wounded piano and high notes of "To Be Loved" shared the chill-inducing quality of "Someone like You" (2011). Writing for the Los Angeles Times, Mikael Wood described the vocals in the song's climax as "a howl of pain", and deemed it remarkable that "everybody in Los Angeles didn't stop on the day she recorded it and wonder what they just heard".

Murray thought the beautiful melody and chord structure of "To Be Loved" contrasted with its dark lyrics. NME's El Hunt felt the song's production is so tender, one can almost feel the silky "hammers of the keys". Sanchez praised its figurative lyricism. David Cobbald of The Line of Best Fit considered "To Be Loved" both lyrically and melodically strong, as well as "one of Adele's best vocal performances to date", but thought its replayability was compromised by its theatricality. Writing for MusicOMH, Graeme Marsh thought she went overboard feeling sorry for herself and came across as if she was trying to convince herself she did everything to prevent her divorce, a recurring theme on 30, but described the song as stunning nonetheless.

Several publications included "To Be Loved" in their list of the best songs of 2021. The Sydney Morning Herald's Robert Moran placed the song at number three and deemed it worthy of a standing ovation due to Adele's stentorian vocals reminiscent of Houston. Lindsay Zoladz of The New York Times included it at number six and stated that it was emblematic of her being "regal as ever", but freshly open to the world and daring enough to get a little sullied. Willman listed "To Be Loved" at number seven, opined that it was the most monumental 30 track, and thought Adele's vocal performance on it would make listeners shout from their rooftops that "Adele is one of the great singers of our lifetime". The Los Angeles Times placed the song at number 10, and Wood declared it "the vocal performance of the year".

Jordan Rose of Complex included "To Be Loved" at number 19, naming it one of the "crown jewels" of Adele's discography, and deemed it "beautiful, painful, and [illustrative of] one of the album's core themes: authentic love comes at a cost and it never truly fades away". The Line of Best Fit listed the song at number 37, and Cobbald stated that it was a standout on 30 and "arguably Adele's best vocal performance to date", topping off her position as the "queen of heartbroken millennials". Pitchfork's Owen Myers placed it at number 39 and praised her vocal control on it: "She pushes her voice way past the elegant restraint that is her signature, as it curdles into squalls and ragged screams." Andrew Unterberger of Billboard included "To Be Loved" at number 45 and remarked that Adele "sinks her heart, soul and diaphragm into [the] personal anthem about refusing to regret not looking before she leaps" over its deservedly lengthy duration. The song was also placed on unranked lists by the Associated Press and Vogue.

== Credits and personnel ==
Credits are adapted from the liner notes of 30.

- Tobias Jesso Jr. – producer, songwriter, piano
- Shawn Everett – producer, engineering
- Adele – songwriter
- Randy Merrill – mastering
- Matt Scatchell – mixing
- Tom Elmhirst – mixing
- Ivan Wayman – engineering

== Charts ==
Chart positions for "To Be Loved"
Chart (2021)	Peak position
Australia (ARIA)	25
Canada Hot 100 (Billboard)	16
France (SNEP)	116
Global 200 (Billboard)	19
Iceland (Tónlistinn)	17
Portugal (AFP)	48
Sweden (Sverigetopplistan)	26
UK Audio Streaming (OCC)	12
US Billboard Hot 100	32

== Certification ==
Certification for "To Be Loved"
Region	Certification	Certified units/sales
Brazil (Pro-Música Brasil)	Gold	20,000^{‡}
United Kingdom (BPI)	Silver	200,000^{‡}
^{‡} Sales+streaming figures based on certification alone.
