= Can I Get It =

2021 song by Adele

Song by Adele

from the album 30
- Released: 19 November 2021
- Studio: MXM Studios (Stockholm and Los Angeles); House Mouse Studios (Sweden); Kallbacken Studios (Sweden); Eastcote Studios (London)
- Genre: Jangle pop
- Length: 3:30
- Label: Columbia
- Songwriters: Adele Adkins; Max Martin; Shellback
- Producers: Max Martin; Shellback

Lyric video
- "Can I Get It" on YouTube

"Can I Get It" is a song by the English singer Adele from her fourth studio album, 30 (2021), written with the Swedish producers Max Martin and Shellback. The song became available as the album's sixth track on 19 November 2021, when it was released by Columbia Records. A pop song with pop rock and country pop influences, "Can I Get It" has acoustic guitar, drum, and horn instrumentation and a whistled hook. The song is about moving on from a breakup and explores Adele's search for true love and the thrilling and wondrous parts of a new relationship.

"Can I Get It" received mixed reviews from music critics, who were generally positive about its acoustic portion and lyrics, but highly criticised its whistled hook. Some thought that what they called the song's "brazen" pop production catered to the tastes of mainstream radio, which made it an outlier on 30, and compared it to Flo Rida's single "Whistle" (2012). It reached the top 20 in Sweden, Canada, Switzerland, Australia, Finland, and Norway and entered the top 40 in some other countries.

== Background and chart performance ==
Adele began working on her fourth studio album by 2018. She filed for divorce from her husband Simon Konecki in September 2019, which inspired the album. After experiencing anxiety, Adele undertook therapy sessions and mended her estranged relationship with her father. Single again for the first time in almost ten years, she sought a serious relationship in Los Angeles but struggled to find one. Adele said, "I lasted five seconds [dating there ...], everyone is someone or everyone wants to be someone." She had regular conversations with her son, which inspired her return to the studio and the album was developed as a body of work that would explain to her son why she left his father.

Adele co-wrote the song "Can I Get It" with Swedish record producers Max Martin and Shellback, who had produced her 2016 Mainstream Top 40 number-one single "Send My Love (To Your New Lover)". "Can I Get It" is about wanting to be in a committed relationship instead of one centred around casual sex. She released "Easy on Me" as the lead single from the album, entitled 30, on 14 October 2021. Adele announced the album's tracklist, which included "Can I Get It" as the sixth track, on 1 November 2021. It became available for digital download on 30, which was released on 19 November.

In the United Kingdom, "Can I Get It" debuted at number 7 on the Official Audio Streaming Chart. The song peaked at number 26 on the US Billboard Hot 100 issued on 4 December 2021. It charted at number 11 on the Canadian Hot 100. "Can I Get It" debuted at number 15 in Australia. The song peaked at number 39 in New Zealand. Elsewhere, it charted at number 9 in Sweden, number 13 on the Billboard Global 200, number 14 in Switzerland, number 16 in Finland, number 19 in Norway, number 25 in Denmark, number 32 in Portugal, number 40 in Austria, number 71 in France, and number 94 in Spain.

== Composition ==
Can I Get It
The whistled hook of "Can I Get It" (sampled) received comparisons to Flo Rida's song "Whistle" (2012). Critics viewed its radio-friendly production as an outlier on 30.

"Can I Get It" is three minutes and 30 seconds long. Martin and Shellback produced and programmed the song, which was recorded at MXM Studios, House Mouse Studios, and Kallbacken Studios in Sweden, MXM Studios in Los Angeles, and Eastcote Studios in London. Martin played piano and keyboards; Shellback played drums, bass, guitar, percussion, and keyboards and provided the whistle and stomps; Adele assisted him with handclaps. Randy Merrill mastered it at Sterling Sound Studios in New York City; Serban Ghenea and John Hanes mixed it at MixStar Studios in Virginia Beach, Virginia; and Lasse Mårtén, Michael Ilbert, and Sam Holland engineered it.

"Can I Get It" is a pop song, with influences of pop rock and country pop. The song has a kitchen sink production, which incorporates "acoustic guitar breakdowns, slickly produced drum loops, [...] and horns" according to Exclaim!'s Kyle Mullin. It includes a three-chord riff and Martin and Shellback provide a 2010s music-influenced whistle for its hook. This inclusion was likened to Flo Rida's single "Whistle" (2012), and Lady Gaga's song "Why Did You Do That?" (2018). The Los Angeles Times's Mikael Wood and Variety's Chris Willman likened the "boot-scooting acoustic groove" and chorus guitar strums of "Can I Get It" to George Michael's single "Faith" (1987). Adele moans during the song's chorus; writing for Slant Magazine, Eric Mason stated that its spirited percussion instrumentation and her hushed moans construct a sultry atmosphere but get interrupted by its "discordantly chirpy whistle drop". Ilana Kaplan of Consequence described it as a "'70s rock-inspired track" and David Cobbald of The Line of Best Fit called it an "American-inspired, stomping rodeo of a song".

"Can I Get It" has lyrics about moving on from a breakup. Adele returns to dating and tries to be more vulnerable with a new partner: "I'm counting on you/to put the pieces of me back together". The song is about searching for a true romantic relationship, refusing to settle for a hookup. It explores the thrilling and wondrous parts of a romantic relationship. The lyrics of "Can I Get It" avow and assure an extremely devoted love that borders on desperation and subservience. She expresses optimism in the song and counts on this new affair to "set [her] free". Adele pauses mid-sentence while singing its chorus's lyric "Let me just come and get it".

== Critical reception ==
"Can I Get It" received mixed reviews from music critics, who thought it strayed from the rest of 30, which consisted mostly of emotional ballads that seek Adele's identity outside of romantic relationships. MusicOMH's Graeme Marsh thought the song's optimism and whistled portion made it sound misplaced. Peter Piatkowski of PopMatters stated that its brazen pop production felt "a bit shocking, almost disrespectful, and discordant" in the context of the album but praised its "earworm" hook and infectious chorus and favourably compared it to Adele's 2010 single "Rolling in the Deep". Writing for DIY, Emma Swann viewed "Can I Get It" as "easily Adele's most conventionally 'pop' moment to date" and added that though its production defies her signature ballads, it also projects more character. The A.V. Club's Gabrielle Sanchez wrote that the song constituted the "most pop-oriented and straightforward" segment of 30, along with "Oh My God", but criticised its whistling as "a hollow carry-over from 2010s radio pop". Maura Johnston of Entertainment Weekly opined that it was one of "a few grand pop moments" on the album and noted that its carefree production complements its lyrics. Writing for Billboard, Jason Lipshutz ranked "Can I Get It" as the second-best song on 30; he believed it succeeded on all levels and could outdo the radio success of "Easy on Me".

NME's El Hunt thought the acoustic part of "Can I Get It" was bright and intriguing but derailed by its whistled hook. Cobbald praised the harmonies in its chorus but derided it as a "2013 Kesha B-side, or something like 'Whistle' by Flo Rida"; he believed it did not attain what its writers intended. Writing for The Independent, Annabel Nugent described the "stomp-and-clap hook" of "Can I Get It" as "most unsettling" and thought Martin and Shellback left more of a mark on it than "Send My Love (To Your New Lover)". Mapes identified the whistling as a "corny '10s pop trend" and thought it was crafted with pop and country radio in mind. Willman named the song as the "most obvious booster-shot-bop" on 30 and praised it as "Frankenstein-ian pop confection" but questioned if its different parts meshed well. Wood opined that it lived up to its title.

Piatkowski thought the vulnerability and honest depiction of love in the lyrics of "Can I Get It" showcased "the sting and candor of Adele at her most honest". Kaplan stated that she waded into "more sensual territory" in the song, and Sanchez said it "harnesses a sensuality not often heard in Adele's work". The latter dismissed it as less interesting than the rest of the album and opined that the raw and moving lyricism on other tracks renders it a "mere blip in the grandeur of the rest of the album". Hunt thought that while the rest of 30's lyrics "stick to safer territory", Adele's pause in the chorus of "Can I Get It" is more frisky.

== Credits and personnel ==
Credits are adapted from the liner notes of 30.

- Adele – vocals, songwriter, stomps, handclaps
- Max Martin – producer, songwriter, piano, programming, keyboards
- Shellback – producer, songwriter, drums, bass, guitar, percussion, programming, whistle, keyboards, stomps, handclaps
- Randy Merrill – mastering
- Serban Ghenea – mixing
- John Hanes – mixing
- Lasse Mårtén – engineering
- Michael Ilbert – engineering
- Sam Holland – engineering

== Charts ==
Chart performance for "Can I Get It"
Chart (2021)	Peak position
Australia (ARIA)	15
Austria (Ö3 Austria Top 40)	40
Canada Hot 100 (Billboard)	11
Denmark (Tracklisten)	25
Finland (Suomen virallinen lista)	16
France (SNEP)	71
Global 200 (Billboard)	13
Iceland (Tónlistinn)	10
New Zealand (Recorded Music NZ)	39
Norway (VG-lista)	19
Portugal (AFP)	32
Spain (PROMUSICAE)	94
Sweden (Sverigetopplistan)	9
Switzerland (Schweizer Hitparade)	14
UK Audio Streaming (OCC)	7
US Billboard Hot 100	26

== Certifications ==
Certifications for "Can I Get It"
Region	Certification	Certified units/sales
Australia (ARIA)	Gold	35,000^{‡}
Brazil (Pro-Música Brasil)	Gold	20,000^{‡}
New Zealand (RMNZ)	Gold	15,000^{‡}
United Kingdom (BPI)	Silver	200,000^{‡}
^{‡} Sales+streaming figures based on certification alone.
