= Joey Pecoraro =

American musician and record producer

Joey Pecoraro is an American musician and record producer from Detroit, Michigan. He rose to prominence in the lofi hip-hop movement of the late 2010s with the title track from his self-released debut studio album Tired Boy (2017). This album also spawned the track "Finding Parking", which was used as the musical base of "All Night Parking" from British singer Adele's album 30 (2021).

== Discography ==
- Joey Pecoraro (2025)
- All the Things in the World (2023)
- Old Time Radio (Alpha Pup Records, 2021)
- Sea Monster (Alpha Pup Records, 2020)
- Deep In A Dream Of You (2019)
- Music For Happiness (2018)
- Tired Boy (2017)
- Little Pear (2015)
- The Strange and Impossible (2014)

== Awards and nominations ==
Award	Year	Nominated work	Category	Result	Ref
Grammy Awards	2023	30	Album of the Year	Nominated	
