= My Little Love =

2021 song by Adele

Song by Adele

from the album 30
- Released: 19 November 2021
- Studio: No Expectations; The EastWood Scoring Stage (Los Angeles, California)
- Genre: Jazz; R&B; soul
- Length: 6:29
- Label: Columbia
- Songwriters: Adele Adkins; Greg Kurstin
- Producer: Greg Kurstin

Lyric video
- "My Little Love" on YouTube

"My Little Love" is a song by the English singer Adele from her fourth studio album, 30 (2021). Adele wrote it with its producer, Greg Kurstin. The song became available as the album's third track on 19 November 2021, when it was released by Columbia Records. "My Little Love" is a jazz, R&B, and soul song with a 1970s-style groove and influences of gospel music. The song incorporates voice notes of Adele's conversations with her son as she explains the effects of her divorce on his life and pleads for his understanding and forgiveness.

Critics generally praised "My Little Love", comparing it to the work of Marvin Gaye, among other artists. Reviews highlighted the emotionalism and vulnerability displayed in the song, but some found the inclusion of the voice notes excessive. The track reached the top 20 in Australia, Canada, Iceland, the Netherlands, New Zealand, and Sweden and entered the top 40 in several other countries.

== Background ==
Adele began working on her fourth studio album by 2018. She filed for divorce from her husband, Simon Konecki, in September 2019, which influenced the development of the album. After experiencing anxiety, Adele undertook therapy sessions and mended her estranged relationship with her father. The divorce's effect on her seven-year-old son plagued Adele during the following years. She decided to have regular conversations with him, which she recorded following advice from her therapist. These inspired Adele's return to the studio and the album took shape as a body of work that would explain to her son why she left his father.

Adele wrote "My Little Love" with Greg Kurstin, who had produced three songs for her third studio album, 25 (2015) – "Hello", "Million Years Ago", and "Water Under the Bridge". During one of Adele's conversations with her son, he said: "I can't see you". She conceived "My Little Love" in a studio the following day and decided to incorporate voice notes of the conversation in the song, inspired by Tyler, the Creator and Skepta. Adele believed it "might be a nice touch" and give fans a window into her personal life. (Note: Adele had previously kept her son away from the limelight. She sued the photo agency Corbis Images UK, after they published paparazzi photos of him taken in 2013, and won.) She recalled that creating the song cleared up some of the emotional chaos that was obstructing her ability to express her feelings. Listening to it would calm Adele's anxiety about whether she answered her son's questions appropriately.

Though Adele considered that her son might dislike "My Little Love" in the future, she thought it was an important song and decided to put it on the album: "He'll probably go through stages of hating it when he's a teenager… But it was an important part of the puzzle I was trying to figure out of my life—not the album—so I had to include it." She released "Easy on Me" as the lead single from the album, entitled 30, on 14 October 2021. Adele announced the tracklist on 1 November 2021, which included "My Little Love" as the third track. The song became available for digital download on 30, which was released on 19 November.

== Composition ==
"My Little Love" is 6 minutes and 29 seconds long. Kurstin produced the song and engineered it with Julian Burg at No Expectations Studios in Los Angeles. Kurstin played bass, mellotron, piano, and steel guitar, and Chris Dave played drums and percussion. David Campbell arranged and conducted the strings, which were recorded at the EastWood Scoring Stage in Burbank, California. Tom Elmhirst mixed the song at Electric Lady Studios in New York City, and Randy Merrill mastered it at Sterling Sound in Edgewater, New Jersey.

"My Little Love"
"My Little Love" incorporates voice notes of Adele's conversations with her son over an arpeggiated piano chord progression. Several critics likened the song to the work of Marvin Gaye.

"My Little Love" is a jazz, R&B, and soul song which incorporates voice notes of Adele's conversations with her son. It is influenced by gospel music and 1970s soul. The song employs an arpeggiated late-night bar piano chord progression and a lightly oscillating funk bassline. According to Variety's Chris Willman, it has a groove that begins with a restrained electric piano and concludes in "swirls of orchestration". Adele delivers vocals in a low register, which Annabel Nugent of The Independent considered analogous to "smoke pluming from a lit cigarette perched on an ashtray". Several critics likened "My Little Love" to the work of Marvin Gaye; (Note: Cited to Vogue, NPR, The Daily Telegraph, and The New York Times) Vogue's Abby Aguirre highlighted its elements—"sexy '70s groove, heavy strings, heavier lyrics", and NPR's Nate Chinen believed the similarity was in "the stylistic legacy of the song—down to the gently tripping melisma that concludes each line in the verse". AllMusic's Neil Z. Yeung believed the "smoky R&B production" recalls "early-2000s Alicia Keys", and Mikael Wood of the Los Angeles Times described it as "a lush soul jam with echoes of classic Isaac Hayes".

The lyrics of "My Little Love" are written from the perspective of a mother pleading for understanding and forgiveness from her child. Adele discusses her divorce and admits her guilt about the way it has changed her son's life, addressing herself as "mama" and him as "my little love". The voice notes from her son include him asking several questions. During the first bridge, Adele asks him to say he loves her, to which he replies: "I love you a million percent". This alternates in the second bridge, when he confesses that he "feel[s] like you don't love me" and Adele replies that she loves him more than anyone else. At 1:54, she tells him that she has "been having a lot of big feelings recently"; she elaborates that she feels confused and lost after he implores her to explain what she means. She assures him that she still loves his father because he would not exist without the latter. The song concludes with a voicemail Adele recorded for a friend, in which she confesses to having a hangover and experiencing anxiety, paranoia, and loneliness: "I feel like today is the first day since I left him that I feel lonely. And I never feel lonely [...] I feel a bit frightened that I might feel like this a lot."

== Critical reception ==
Critics praised "My Little Love" as raw, honest, and touching. (Note: Cited to The A.V. Club, Clash, PopMatters, and Marie Claire) The A.V. Club's Gabrielle Sanchez observed a "push and pull [...] of a mother needing her son for support while feeling guilty about wearing these emotions on her sleeve for him to see", and PopMatters's Peter Piatkowski thought "the discomfort grows as the emotional baggage depicted in the lyrics threaten to collapse whatever dam is holding Adele in".

Some reviewers felt the inclusion of the voice notes on "My Little Love" was excessive. (Note: Cited to the Los Angeles Times and The Daily Telegraph) Neil McCormick of The Daily Telegraph wondered "whether we really needed to hear home recordings of Adele laying all her woes on her own child or blubbering into her phone during bouts of insecurity"; Consequence's Ilana Kaplan found them unnecessary but indicative of Adele's state of mind. Reviewers also commented on Adele's expression of loneliness and vulnerability in the closing voicemail. (Note: Cited to Pitchfork, The Guardian, and AllMusic) Alexis Petridis of The Guardian described it as "bold no-holds barred wound-showing" akin to John Lennon's song "Mother" (1970). Pitchfork's Jill Mapes believed it was "Adele's version of rock bottom", and DIY's Emma Swann called it a "gut-wrenching climax".

Critics considered "My Little Love" one of the most emotional songs on 30 (Note: Cited to Yahoo! Entertainment, Harper's Bazaar, and The New York Times) and thought it displayed more vulnerability than Adele's previous work. (Note: Cited to Harper's Bazaar, Exclaim!, Entertainment Weekly, and Slant Magazine) Writing for Slant Magazine, Eric Mason found Adele's affirmation of her love for her son brought forth a more honest sense of sadness than her previous heartbreak-themed songs. Exclaim!'s Kyle Mullin said the song exemplified her thematic evolution in her releases of the preceding decade.

David Cobbald of The Line of Best Fit thought "My Little Love" was the album's best showcase of Adele's creativity and skill. Ranking the song 11th among the album tracks, Jason Lipshutz of Billboard stated that "Adele has never been bolder in her song construction". Rolling Stone placed it at number 24 in a 2021 ranking of Adele's discography.

== Commercial performance ==
In the United Kingdom, "My Little Love" debuted at number five on the Official Audio Streaming Chart. (Note: The Official Audio Streaming Chart is not the official singles chart. It ranks songs based on their popularity on streaming services.) The song charted at number 23 on the US Billboard Hot 100. It peaked at number 14 on the Canadian Hot 100. In Australia, "My Little Love" reached number 11. The song charted at number 10 in New Zealand. On the Billboard Global 200, it peaked at number 12. "My Little Love" reached several national record charts: at number 5 in Iceland, number 14 in the Netherlands, number 16 in Sweden, number 33 in Portugal, number 35 in Norway, number 37 in Denmark, and number 66 in France. The song received a gold certification in Brazil.

== Credits and personnel ==
Credits are adapted from the liner notes of 30.

- Greg Kurstin – producer, songwriter, engineer, bass, mellotron, piano, steel guitar
- Adele – songwriter
- Julian Burg – engineer
- Chris Dave – drums, percussion
- David Campbell - strings arrangement, strings conduction
- Randy Merrill – mastering
- Tom Elmhirst – mixing

== Charts ==
Chart positions for "My Little Love"
| Chart (2021) | Peak position |
|---|---|
| Australia (ARIA) | 11 |
| Canada Hot 100 (Billboard) | 14 |
| Denmark (Tracklisten) | 37 |
| France (SNEP) | 66 |
| Global 200 (Billboard) | 12 |
| Iceland (Tónlistinn) | 5 |
| Netherlands (Single Top 100) | 14 |
| New Zealand (Recorded Music NZ) | 10 |
| Norway (VG-lista) | 35 |
| Portugal (AFP) | 33 |
| Sweden (Sverigetopplistan) | 16 |
| UK Audio Streaming (OCC) | 5 |
| US Billboard Hot 100 | 23 |

== Certifications ==
Certification for "My Little Love"
| Region | Certification | Certified units/sales |
|---|---|---|
| Brazil (Pro-Música Brasil) | Gold | 20,000^{‡} |
| New Zealand (RMNZ) | Gold | 15,000^{‡} |
^{‡} Sales+streaming figures based on certification alone.
