= 30 (album) =

Studio album by Adele
- Released: 19 November 2021
- Recorded: 2018 – February 2020
- Studios: Eastcote (London); Elbo (California); Henson (California); House Mouse (Stockholm, Sweden); Källbacken (Stockholm, Sweden); Metropolis (London); MixStar (Virginia Beach); MXM (Los Angeles); MXM (Stockholm, Sweden); No Expectations (Los Angeles); Serenity West; The EastWood Scoring Stage (California); Will's Grandma's House (California)
- Genres: Pop; soul; jazz
- Length: 58:14
- Label: Columbia
- Producers: Greg Kurstin; Inflo; Tobias Jesso Jr.; Ludwig Göransson; Max Martin; Shawn Everett; Shellback

Adele chronology
25 (2015)	30 (2021)	Weekends with Adele Live in Las Vegas (2025)

Singles from 30
- 1. "Easy on Me" Released: 15 October 2021; 2. "Oh My God" Released: 29 November 2021; 3. "I Drink Wine" Released: 4 November 2022

30 is the fourth studio album by the English singer and songwriter Adele. It was released on 19 November 2021 by Columbia Records. Her first studio album in six years following 25 (2015), 30 was inspired by Adele's experiences and anxiety following her divorce and its impact on her son's life, along with motherhood and fame. Adele had begun working on the album in 2018 and collaborated with producers such as Greg Kurstin, Max Martin, Inflo, Tobias Jesso Jr., Ludwig Göransson, Shawn Everett, and Shellback.

Musically, 30 is a pop, soul, and jazz album, which incorporates dance-pop, gospel, and R&B elements. The album was promoted with the television specials Adele One Night Only and An Audience with.... Three singles were released from the album. The lead single, "Easy on Me", reached number one in several countries, including the US and UK. The follow-up singles, "Oh My God" and "I Drink Wine", charted in the UK chart's top five simultaneously with it.

30 received acclaim from music critics, who emphasised Adele's vocal performance as well as the lyricism and subject matter. Media outlets included it in their lists of the best albums of 2021. The album was nominated for six Grammy Awards, including Album of the Year, and it won the Brit Award for British Album of the Year at the Brit Awards 2022, making Adele the first solo artist in history to win the award three times, having won previously for 21 and 25.

30 topped the charts in 25 countries. In the UK, it achieved the highest first-week sales for any album by a female artist since Adele's third studio album, 25 (2015). It spent five weeks at number one there and six in the US. 30 was the best-selling album of the year in both countries, as well as worldwide, with 5.54 million copies sold.

== Background ==
During the conception of her third studio album, 25 (2015), Adele wrote enough material for what she believed could be three or four albums. She later revealed that she had four or five songs that she might revisit at a later date, among them a Greg Kurstin-produced song that she felt was more appropriate once she was older. In 2018, mainstream media outlets reported that Adele was working on her fourth studio album. Drummer Matt Chamberlain confirmed that he had been in the studio with her for her fourth studio album, along with Rick Nowels, John Legend and Raphael Saadiq, in hopes of crafting an album "full of soul, with a more eclectic sound."

Following Adele's marriage to Simon Konecki in 2018, she filed for divorce in 2019. She began taking therapy sessions and mended her estranged relationship with her father. Adele experienced anxiety which, along with her separation from Konecki and the scrutiny of fame and motherhood, inspired 30. The divorce's effect on her son plagued Adele during the following years. She decided to have regular conversations with him, which she recorded following advice from her therapist. These inspired Adele's return to the studio, and the album took shape as a body of work that would explain to her son why she left his father.

Early on in the promotion for 25, Adele revealed that she planned to stop naming albums after her age. However, on her 31st birthday, Adele published a rare social media post in which she – seemingly jokingly – referred to her next album as 30, alluding to the theme of her previous three albums' titles. On 15 February 2020, Adele announced at a friend's wedding that her fourth studio album would be out by September 2020. However, she would later confirm that the album's production and release had been delayed due to the COVID-19 pandemic.

On 18 October 2020, Adele confirmed she would be hosting the 24 October episode of Saturday Night Live, reinvigorating fans' hope that new music would be imminent. However, during the episode, Adele confirmed that her fourth studio album was not yet finished. She later hinted via an Instagram post that she would be returning to music in 2021. Comedian Alan Carr, a close friend of Adele's, also hinted that the album would be released in 2021, describing the material he had heard from the album as "amazing" during an interview with Grazia's UK edition.

== Writing and recording ==
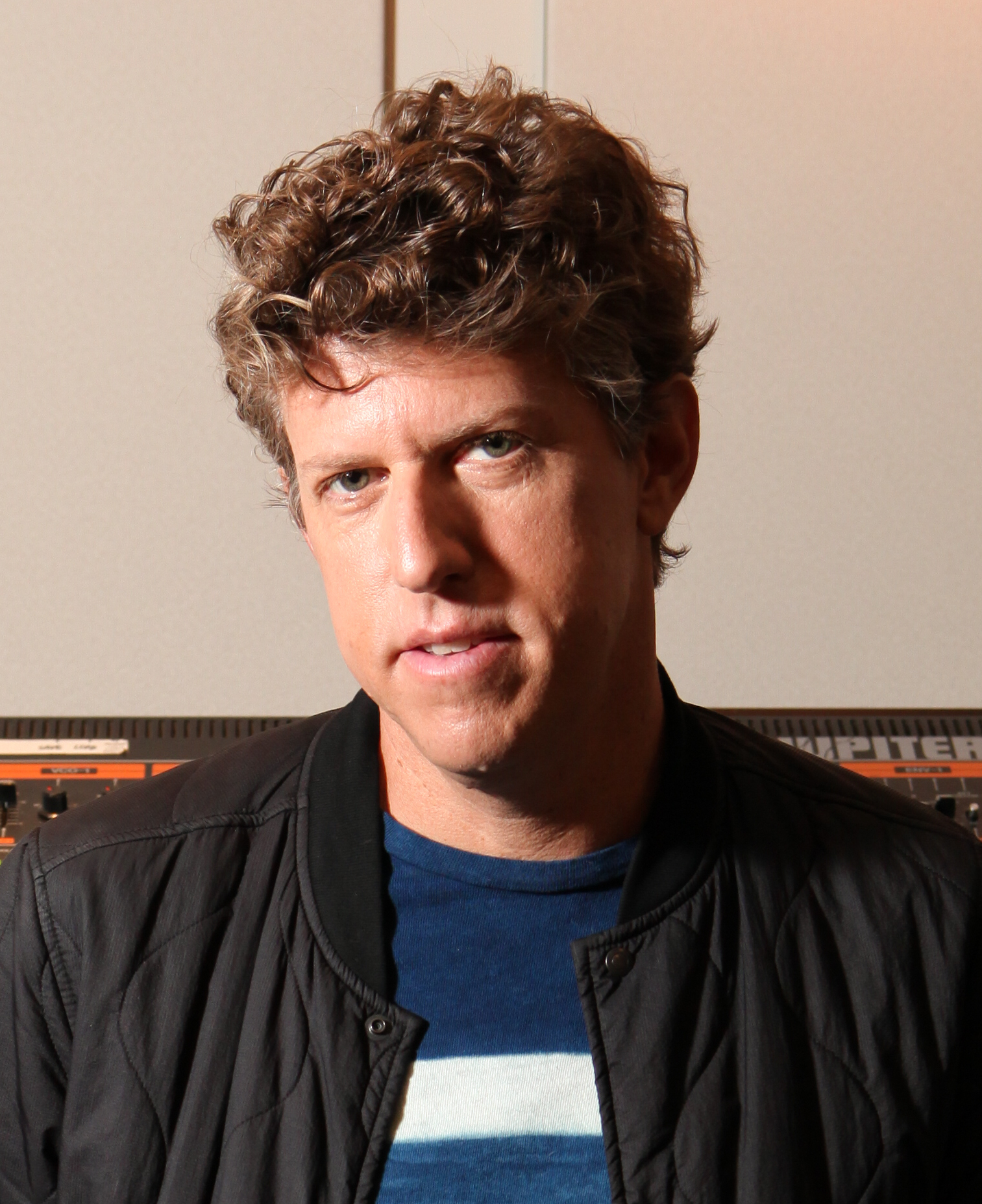
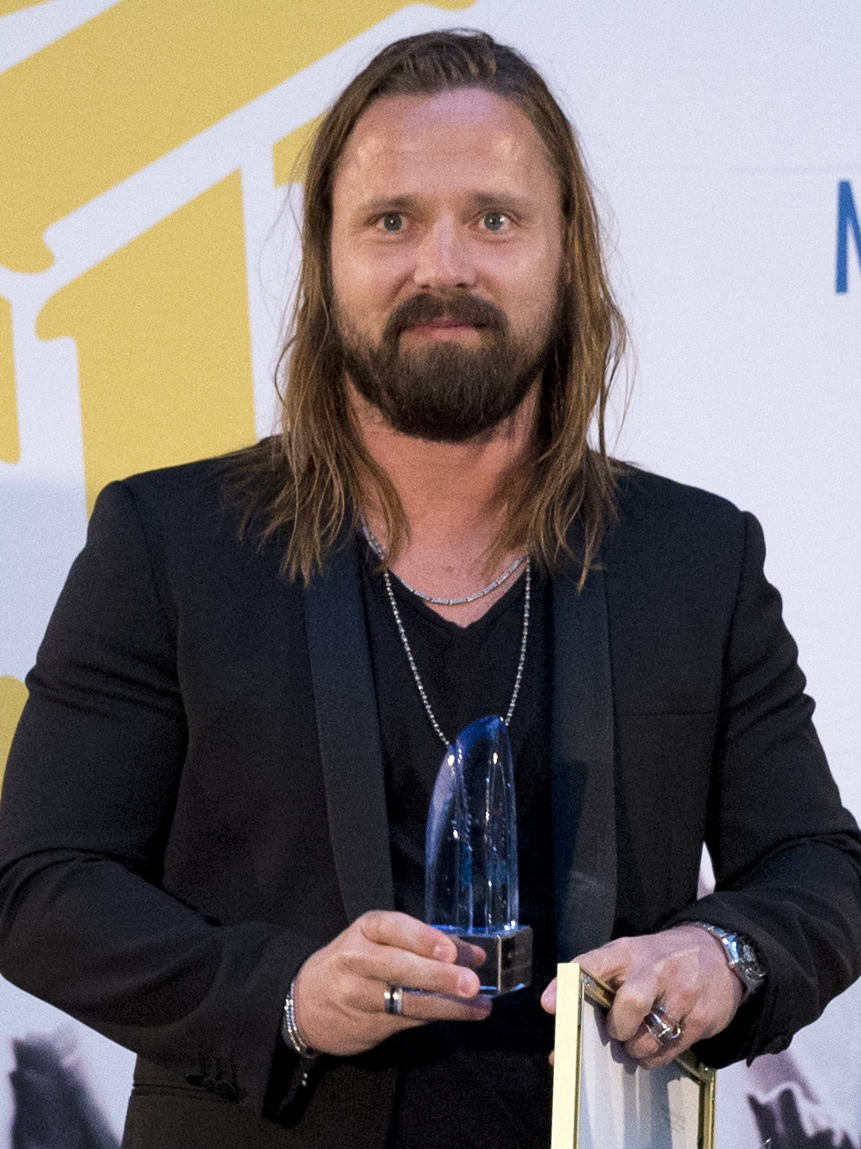
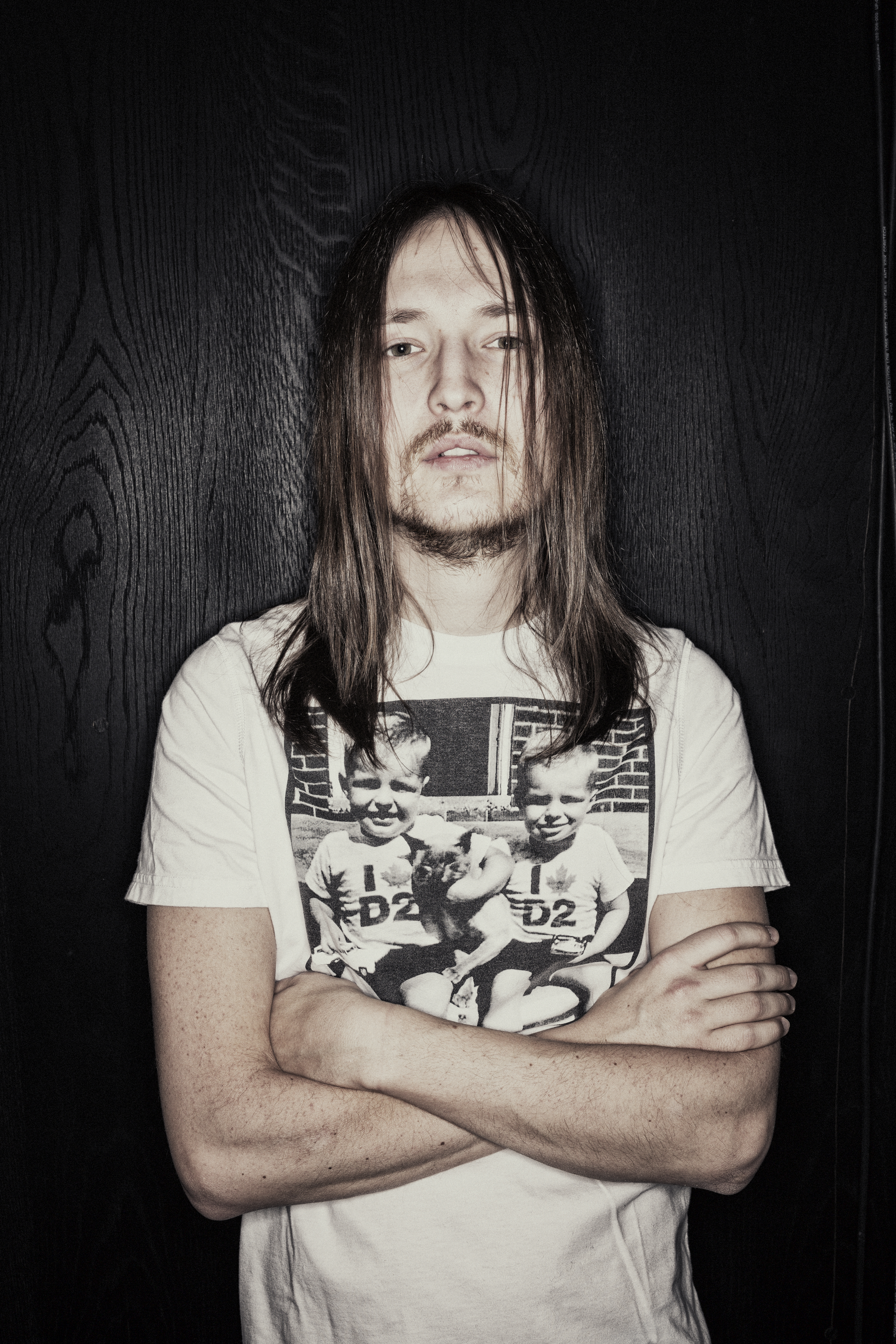
Previous collaborators Greg Kurstin, Max Martin, and Shellback (pictured left to right), also served as producers on 30.

Using music as an outlet post-divorce, Adele went to the studio describing it as "basically running away". Similarly to Adele's previous albums, the vocal tracks used on 30 are original demos. Adele wanted to create a "safe space" during the album's recording and opted to work with fewer people than on her previous project 25. Choosing producers Adele felt comfortable with influenced her choice in collaborators. Adele reunited with Kurstin, a long-time collaborator and friend, which allowed her to feel as though she "could say anything, sing anything, and they wouldn't judge me." Together Adele and Kurstin worked on six songs; "Easy on Me", "My Little Love", "Cry Your Heart Out", "Oh My God", "I Drink Wine" and "All Night Parking".

Originally a 15-minute song, inspired by Elton John and Bernie Taupin, "I Drink Wine" was written by Adele to express her remorse for not being present for a close friend and was later cut short following label feedback. "All Night Parking" posthumously credits American jazz pianist Erroll Garner as a featured artist, making it the first song on a standard Adele album to have a featured artist credit. Adele worked with previous collaborators and Swedish producers and songwriters Max Martin and Shellback, and Canadian singer-songwriter Tobias Jesso Jr. "Oh My God", produced by Kurstin, was written during a period of time when Adele's anxiety was subsiding. Referencing dating post-divorce, Adele wrote the song inspired by her first time flirting after her split with Konecki.

Adele also worked with producers for the first time, including Swedish composer Ludwig Göransson, and British producer Inflo (of the music collective Sault). Heavily inspired by the Judy Garland biopic, Adele was attracted to the new sounds, chords and cadences Göransson introduced to her which led to the song "Strangers by Nature". Adele immediately gravitated towards Inflo, due to their similar age and both being raised in North London. The pair's recording sessions would often start with extensive conversations, before pin-pointing an emotion they wanted to write about. Together they wrote and produced three songs, "Woman like Me", "Hold On" and "Love Is a Game". The latter was inspired by Breakfast at Tiffany's, which was played on mute during the recording sessions. "Hold On" was written by Adele regarding the numerous times she lost hope during her divorce and features backing vocals from her friends. Recalling writing the track Adele said; "I remember I didn't belly laugh for about a year. But I didn't realize I was making progress until I wrote 'Hold On' and listened to it back. Later, I was like, 'Oh, fuck, I've really learned a lot. I've really come a long way.'" By February 2020, 30 was mostly completed, except for some orchestral elements and backing vocals.

== Composition ==
I just felt like I wanted to explain to him, through this record, when he's in his 20s or 30s, who I am and why I voluntarily chose to dismantle his entire life in the pursuit of my own happiness. It made him really unhappy sometimes. And that's a real wound for me that I don't know if I'll ever be able to heal.

— Adele on her son and 30, Vogue

Stereogum described 30 as a pop, soul, and jazz record. It also contains elements of R&B, gospel, and dance-pop. The album incorporates choir vocals, harmonies, voice notes, violins, strings, organs, and horns. Thematically, the album addresses Adele's divorce, anxiety, and motherhood. During an Instagram Live on 9 October 2021, Adele reiterated that 30 would centre on her divorce. Adele noted that 30 is more introspective than her previous efforts. "I feel like this album is self-destruction, then self-reflection and then sort of self-redemption", she said. "I really want people to hear my side of the story this time."

=== Songs ===
The album opens with "Strangers by Nature", a cinematic song featuring organs, strings and mournful lyrics. The song closes with the line "All right then, I'm ready", before leading into "Easy on Me". The latter is a piano torch ballad, on which Adele addresses her divorce and pleads for forgiveness and understanding from her son, ex-husband, and herself. "My Little Love" is a jazz, R&B, and soul song, which incorporates voice notes of Adele's conversations with her son as she explains the effects of her divorce on his life and apologizes. The album's fourth track, "Cry Your Heart Out" is an uptempo piano-driven song, contrasting with its lyrics about depression and anxiety, but also the feeling of relief. The production of "Oh My God" incorporates claps, keys, the organ, and bass along with an R&B groove and dance-pop–electropop sample. It lyrically details Adele's first time being flirted with after her divorce. "Can I Get It" is an upbeat acoustic guitar-driven track with a whistled chorus. Lyrically, the song is about love and desiring a true and lasting relationship. "I Drink Wine" is a gospel-oriented power ballad, addressing Adele's divorce and shedding her ego before regaining the ability to love again.

"All Night Parking" is an interlude that features Garner. The song is built around a sample of Joey Pecoraro's "Finding Parking" (2017), which in turn samples Garner's 1964 live performance of his song "No More Shadows" on the BBC television program Jazz 625. The song is about falling in love in a long-distance relationship and the excitement that comes with it. "Woman Like Me", the album's ninth track, has an acoustic instrumental. The song is about a partner who is not willing to move on from his previous relationship and lets it cloud his current one. Adele calls him out for his laziness and self-doubt. "Hold On" is a gospel-tinged song, with Adele backed by a choir. The song describes her feelings about her divorce and telling herself to stay hopeful for the future. "To Be Loved" is also a piano ballad, on which Adele explains her divorce to her son and hopes to find a path to true happiness. The album's closer, "Love Is a Game", is a cinematic jazz-influenced song that lyrically details finding love again and navigating a romantic relationship.

== Release and promotion ==
On the weekend of 1 October, a series of advertising hoardings and projections displaying the number "30" appeared in various locations across the globe, with reports that it could be tied to Adele's forthcoming studio album, 30. On Monday, 4 October, Adele's social media accounts and website were updated to match the blue colour from the advertisements. The next day, Adele officially announced a 15 October release for the album's lead single, "Easy on Me", with a clip of its music video on her social media accounts. Later that week, Adele became the first person to simultaneously appear on the covers of both British and American Vogue publications in the same month. On 13 October 2021, Adele officially announced the album title as 30 and 19 November 2021 as the release date. The track-listing of 30 was revealed on 1 November 2021. A preview of "Hold On" was featured in an Amazon television commercial entitled "Kindness, the Greatest Gift", portraying anxiety among young adults associated with the pandemic and premiered on 8 November 2021.

=== Packaging and distribution ===
On 4 November, Consequence reported that the production of vinyl records for 30 had contributed to "a major delay" in the vinyl industry. More than 500,000 vinyl LPs of 30 were manufactured in the months leading up to the release, as Sony Music removed other albums from its overseas pressing plants, which was a factor along with the pandemic. Adele received criticism for this, however, subsequent reports stated it "probably wasn't [Adele's] fault". Unlike 25, 30 was made available on streaming services the same day as its release on physical formats. Columbia Records, which previously only handled Adele's releases in North America, promoted the album worldwide. The Target-exclusive deluxe edition adds two bonus tracks and a duet version of "Easy on Me" with American singer-songwriter Chris Stapleton. The vinyl variants were sold through digital retailers while cassette tapes were available on Adele's webstore.

=== Marketing and residencies ===
30 was promoted with television specials. The CBS special Adele One Night Only, which featured Adele's interview with Oprah Winfrey along with performances of previously released material and 30 tracks, aired on CBS on 14 November 2021. It drew 11.7 million viewers. The ITV1 special An Audience with..., which was filmed at the London Palladium, aired on 21 November. Adele also announced a Las Vegas concert residency, Weekends with Adele, which was initially scheduled to begin on 21 January 2022 and run for 24 concerts. Adele delayed it, citing production delays and COVID-19. It was eventually rescheduled to begin on 18 November 2022, and after a pair of extensions it ended in June 2024. Adele also performed two concerts at British Summer Time Hyde Park, London, on 1 and 2 July 2022.

=== Singles ===
30 was promoted with three singles. "Easy on Me" was released on 15 October 2021. Upon release, it became the most streamed song, both in a day and a single week on Spotify. The song topped the charts in various countries, including the UK singles chart and the US Billboard Hot 100. Its duet version with Stapleton was promoted to US country radio stations on 19 November 2021. "Oh My God" was released as the second single on 29 November 2021. It debuted at number two on the Official Singles Chart, behind "Easy on Me", and number five on the US Billboard Hot 100. The Sam Brown-directed music video for the song was uploaded on Adele's YouTube channel on 12 January 2022. "I Drink Wine" was sent for radio airplay in Italy on 4 November 2022, as the album's third single. Its release was accompanied by a music video directed by Joe Talbot.

== Critical reception ==
30 ratings
Aggregate scores
Source	Rating
AnyDecentMusic?	7.9/10
Metacritic	88/100
Review scores
Source	Rating
AllMusic	4/5 stars
And It Don't Stop	A−
The Daily Telegraph	5/5 stars
Entertainment Weekly	A−
The Guardian	3/5 stars
The Independent	4/5 stars
NME	3/5 stars
Pitchfork	8.2/10
Rolling Stone	5/5 stars
The Times	4/5 stars

Upon the announcement of 30 and the release of the lead single "Easy on Me", James Hall of The Daily Telegraph wrote that "a new Adele album isn't just a release − it's a global cultural event". Media outlets and fans dubbed 30 as part of a 2021 music trend called "Sad Girl Autumn" or "Sad Girl Fall", which refers to the release of melancholic and introspective music by female artists during autumn. Spotify removed the "shuffle" button for its premium users as Adele proposed and commented that "Our art tells a story and our stories should be listened to as we intended." ABC News called her proposal "an example of her power in the music industry".

30 received acclaim from music critics, many of whom dubbed it as Adele's best album yet. On Metacritic, which assigns a normalised score out of 100 to ratings from publications, the album received a weighted mean score of 88 based on 23 reviews, indicating "universal acclaim". It is Adele's highest-rated album on the site. Critics praised the rawness and intensity of the subject matter and the lyrical themes about hope and acceptance. Neil McCormick of The Daily Telegraph believed it features "powerhouse" songs, "intense" emotions and "bravura" performances. Kate Solomon, writing for The i Paper, said that 30 was a "reverent and messy, polished and painful" album from a "woman in turmoil, from raging wine-fuelled nights to quiet teary moments".

Comparing with Adele's previous albums, veteran critic Robert Christgau described 30 as a "breakthrough" and thought Adele subtly veered into new territory on the album, which is "a step up variety-wise from its predecessors". The Independent critic Annabel Nugent thought it was distinguished because of its inclusion of optimistic love songs, unlike her previous albums. The Guardian's Alexis Petridis thought 30 was monotonous musically and lyrically in comparison, but its tracks which veer from Adele's usual formula are the best ones.

Adele's vocal performance on 30 also received praise, with Rolling Stone's Rob Sheffield describing it as "even more expressive" than her previous releases and "a tank division that can tap dance". Commenting on the production, Sheffield described it as "deft", and Pitchfork's Jillian Mapes called it "nuanced". David Cobbald of The Line of Best Fit complimented the theatrical essence of 30 and the use of electronic instruments and synthesisers but was less impressed by its upbeat songs. Likewise, NME's El Hunt appreciated the incorporation of new sounds but disapproved of "Hold On", "I Drink Wine", and "Can I Get It" as jarring.

The A.V. Club considered 30 Adele's homage to Amy Winehouse and a "thank you" for her impact: "As Winehouse did on Back To Black, here Adele also navigates the grief that comes with breaking the ties of love, washing herself in heartache." The Ringer's Justin Charity opined that the people's interest in Adele was sustained purely because of her vocal prowess, which set het apart from other artists. Time praised Adele for "remaining relevant while blatantly ignoring trends", called her "a master of turning life into art" who "comes off alternately as unreachable and relatable" and "responds winkingly to headlines in a way that creates more headlines". 30 was regarded as one of 2021's greatest pop culture moments.

=== Year-end lists ===
Select year-end rankings of 30
Publication	List	Rank	Ref.
BBC	The 21 Best Albums of 2021	10	
Billboard	The 50 Best Albums of 2021: Staff List	4	
Consequence	Top 50 Albums of 2021	20	
Entertainment Weekly	The 10 best albums of 2021	5	
Los Angeles Times	The 10 best albums of 2021	7	
The New York Times	Lindsay Zoladz's Best Albums of 2021	1	
NPR Music	The 50 Best Albums of 2021	14	
Pitchfork	The 50 Best Albums of 2021	32	
Rolling Stone	50 Best Albums of 2021	2	
Variety	Chris Willman's Top 10 Albums of 2021	5	

== Accolades ==
Adele received four nominations at the Brit Awards 2022, winning three: British Album of the Year for 30, Song of the Year for "Easy on Me", and Artist of the Year. She became the first solo artist in history to win British Album of the Year three times. Adele also received four nominations at the iHeartRadio Music Awards, winning two for 30 with Best Comeback Album and Pop Album of the Year. "Easy on Me" won the Grammy Award for Best Pop Solo Performance at the 65th ceremony, furthering Adele's streak for the most wins in the category, with four.

Awards and nominations for 30
Year	Organization	Award	Result	Ref.
2022	American Music Awards	Favorite Pop Album	Nominated	
2022	ARIA Music Awards	Best International Artist	Nominated	
2022	Billboard Music Awards	Top Billboard 200 Album	Nominated	
2022	Brit Awards	British Album of the Year	Won	
2022	Danish Music Awards	International Album of the Year	Won	
2022	Gaffa Awards	Foreign Album of the Year	Won	
2022	iHeartRadio Music Awards	Best Comeback Album	Won	
2022	iHeartRadio Music Awards	Pop Album of the Year	Won	
2022	Juno Awards	International Album of the Year	Nominated	
2022	Kids' Choice Awards	Favorite Album	Nominated	
2022	Los 40 Music Awards	Best International Album	Nominated	
2022	MTV Video Music Awards	Album of the Year	Nominated	
2023	Grammy Awards	Album of the Year	Nominated	
2023	Grammy Awards	Best Pop Vocal Album	Nominated	

== Commercial performance ==
Three weeks before its release, 30 became the most pre-added album ever on Apple Music and achieved the largest number of pre-adds in a single day.

=== Europe ===
On 22 November 2021, the Official Charts Company reported that 30 logged more sales than the rest of the chart's top 40 combined within just the first half of its opening week. The album achieved the biggest opening week of 2021 and the biggest by a female artist since 25. It debuted at number one with 261,000 copies sold, while Adele charted three of its tracks on the Official Singles Chart's top five simultaneously. 30 spent five consecutive weeks atop the Official Albums Chart, tying Olivia Rodrigo's Sour as the longest-running number one album of 2021. Ranking as the top album of 2021 in the UK, 30 exceeded 600,000 units in total activity, with 502,000 coming from pure sales. 30 debuted at number one in Germany, and with "Easy on Me" being at number one on the German Top 100 Singles chart, Adele became the first female artist to occupy the number one slots on the single and album charts thrice there simultaneously. In Ireland, 30 debuted at number one, outselling the rest of the top 10 combined. 30 debuted at number two in France and reached the top spot in its fifth week, achieving a double platinum certification less than two months later. Debuting at number one in the Netherlands, 30 became the best-selling album of 2021 in the country. It marked Adele's sixth time doing so, and also made her the first artist to have the top-selling album in six different years there. 30 additionally topped the charts in Austria, Belgium, Denmark, Finland, Greece, Iceland, Lithuania, Norway, Scotland, Spain, Sweden, and Switzerland.

=== North America ===
In the United States, 30 became the top-selling album of 2021 within its first day. 30 achieved 2021's biggest opening week, debuting atop the Billboard 200 with 839,000 album-equivalent units, including 692,000 pure album sales. It achieved the fourth-biggest streaming debut week for an album by a woman in 2021 and surpassed the sales of any album in the previous 11 months combined. 30 also outsold the other 100 best-selling albums that week combined, as well as the other top 10 best-selling albums that week combined and tripled. All 12 tracks from 30 charted on the Billboard Hot 100 following its release, with six of them in the top 40. Adele's sum of chart entries rose from 14 to 25, tying her with Billie Eilish as the female artist with the third-most entries on the chart in 2021. 30 also scored the biggest second-week sales of the year and the largest second-week total since 2018. Midway through its third week, 30 had sold over a million pure copies in the US, becoming the first 2021 album to reach the milestone. During its fourth week, 30 became the best-selling vinyl album of 2021. The album spent six total weeks at number one.

30 was certified triple platinum by the Recording Industry Association of America for surpassing three million album-equivalent units in the US. 30 was 2021's year-end best-seller with 1.990 million copies—1.219 million physical copies and 845,000 digital downloads—the only album to sell a million copies. This marked Adele's fifth time with the year's best-selling album. 30 was the fourth-most consumed album of 2021 and second among women, and Adele was the second best-selling artist of 2021. 30 was also the top-selling digital album, CD and vinyl LP of 2021. CNN reported that 30 contributed largely to the rise of both vinyl sales and CD sales, and they were reported to be up for the first time in 17 years. 30 ranked at number two on the 2022 Billboard 200 Year-End chart, as well as number one on the 2022 Billboard Top Album Sales Year-End chart. The International Federation of the Phonographic Industry reported that Adele was the world's third best-selling artist of 2021. 30 was the best-selling album of 2021 worldwide, topping the Global Album All-Format Chart, Global Album Sales Chart, and the newly created Global Vinyl Album Chart. The Wall Street Journal believed that 30 "largely came and went" compared to Adele's previous albums.

30 debuted atop the Billboard Canadian Albums Chart with 70,000 units in its first week, marking Adele's third number one album there. For 2021, 30 was Canada's top-selling album across all formats—digital, CD and vinyl LP. In total, the album spent six nonconsecutive weeks at number one.

=== Asia-Pacific ===
The album topped Australia's ARIA Albums Chart for seven consecutive weeks. It debuted at number one on New Zealand Albums Chart and was certified gold within its first week, spending seven additional consecutive weeks in the position. In Japan, 30 debuted at number five on the Oricon Japanese Albums chart and number four on the Billboard Japanese Albums Chart, while reaching number sixty-eight on the Gaon Album Chart in South Korea.

== Track listing ==
30 track listing
No.	Title	Writer(s)	Producer(s)	Length
1.	"Strangers by Nature"	Adele Adkins; Ludwig Göransson	Göransson	3:02
2.	"Easy on Me"	Adkins; Greg Kurstin	Kurstin	3:44
3.	"My Little Love"	Adkins; Kurstin	Kurstin	6:29
4.	"Cry Your Heart Out"	Adkins; Kurstin	Kurstin	4:15
5.	"Oh My God"	Adkins; Kurstin	Kurstin	3:45
6.	"Can I Get It"	Adkins; Max Martin; Shellback	Martin; Shellback	3:30
7.	"I Drink Wine"	Adkins; Kurstin	Kurstin	6:16
8.	"All Night Parking" (with Erroll Garner) (Interlude)	Adkins; Garner^{[a]}	Joey Pecoraro^{[a]}; Kurstin	2:41
9.	"Woman Like Me"	Adkins; Dean Josiah Cover	Inflo	5:00
10.	"Hold On"	Adkins; Cover	Inflo	6:06
11.	"To Be Loved"	Adkins; Tobias Jesso Jr.	Jesso Jr.; Shawn Everett	6:43
12.	"Love Is a Game"	Adkins; Cover	Inflo	6:43
Total length:				58:14

Target and Japanese edition bonus tracks
No.	Title	Writer(s)	Producer(s)	Length
13.	"Wild Wild West"	Adkins; Göransson	Göransson	3:46
14.	"Can't Be Together"	Adkins; Kurstin	Kurstin	4:18
15.	"Easy on Me" (with Chris Stapleton)	Adkins; Kurstin	Kurstin	3:44
Total length:				70:02

=== Notes ===
- ^{^[a]} "All Night Parking" is built around the musical base of "Finding Parking" (2017) by Joey Pecoraro, which in turn samples the song "No More Shadows" (1964) by Erroll Garner.

== Personnel ==
Credits adapted from official liner notes.

=== Musicians ===
- Adele – vocals (all tracks), voice notes (3), tambourine (5), stomps (6), handclaps (6, 12)
- Ludwig Göransson – piano, bass, rhodes, mellotron, synth programming (1)
- David Campbell – strings (1, 3, 7, 10, 12–15)
- Serena Göransson – strings (1)
- Greg Kurstin – bass, piano (2–5, 7); kick drum (2), mellotron (3, 4, 7), steel guitar (3), handclaps (4, 5), guitar (4), hammond B3 organ (4, 5, 7), drum programming, keyboards (5); percussion (5, 7), orchestron, rhodes (7)
- Angelo Adkins – voice notes (3)
- Chris Dave – drums (3–5, 9), percussion (3, 9, 12), bongos, vibraslap (4)
- Max Martin – piano, programming, keyboards, background vocals (6)
- Shellback – drums, bass, guitar, percussion, programming, whistle, keyboards, stomps, handclaps (6)
- Joey Pecoraro – drums, additional piano, trumpet, violin (8)
- Erroll Garner – piano (8)
- Inflo – bass (9, 10, 12), guitar (9), electric guitar, drums, piano, organ, percussion (10, 12); wurlitzer, handclaps (12)
- Tobias Jesso Jr. – piano (11)
- Chris Stapleton – vocals (15)

=== Technical ===
- Randy Merrill – mastering
- Matt Scatchell – mixing (1–4, 7–12)
- Tom Elmhirst – mixing (1–4, 7–12)
- Şerban Ghenea – mixing (5, 6)
- John Hanes – mixing (5, 6)
- Riley Mackin – engineering (1)
- Steve Churchyard – engineering (1, 3, 7, 10, 12–15)
- Alex Pasco – engineering (2–5, 7)
- Greg Kurstin – engineering (2–5, 7, 14, 15), vocal engineering (8)
- Julian Burg – engineering (2–5, 7, 14, 15), vocal engineering (8)
- Lasse Mårtén – engineering (6)
- Michael Ilbert – engineering (6)
- Sam Holland – engineering (6)
- Inflo – engineering (9, 10, 12)
- Matt Dyson – engineering (9, 12)
- Todd Monfalcone – engineering (9)
- Tom Campbell – engineering (10)
- Ivan Wayman – engineering (11)
- Shawn Everett – engineering (11)
- Ryan Lytle – engineering (12), engineering assistance (9)
- Bryce Bordone – engineering assistance (5, 6)
- Brian Rajaratnam – engineering assistance (10)

== Charts ==
=== Weekly charts ===
Weekly chart performance for 30
Chart (2021–2022)	Peak position
Australian Albums (ARIA)	1
Austrian Albums (Ö3 Austria)	1
Belgian Albums (Ultratop Flanders)	1
Belgian Albums (Ultratop Wallonia)	2
Canadian Albums (Billboard)	1
Croatian International Albums (HDU)	1
Czech Albums (ČNS IFPI)	2
Danish Albums (Hitlisten)	1
Dutch Albums (Album Top 100)	1
Finnish Albums (Suomen virallinen lista)	1
French Albums (SNEP)	1
German Albums (Offizielle Top 100)	1
Greek Albums (IFPI)	1
Hungarian Albums (MAHASZ)	4
Icelandic Albums (Tónlistinn)	1
Irish Albums (Official Charts)	1
Italian Albums (FIMI)	2
Japanese Albums (Oricon)	5
Japanese Download Albums (Billboard Japan)	1
Japanese Hot Albums (Billboard Japan)	4
Lithuanian Albums (AGATA)	1
New Zealand Albums (RMNZ)	1
Norwegian Albums (VG-lista)	1
Polish Albums (ZPAV)	1
Portuguese Albums (AFP)	1
Scottish Albums (Official Charts)	1
Slovak Albums (ČNS IFPI)	2
South Korean Albums (Circle)	68
Spanish Albums (Promusicae)	1
Swedish Albums (Sverigetopplistan)	1
Swiss Albums (Schweizer Hitparade)	1
UK Albums (Official Charts)	1
Uruguayan Albums (CUD)	18
US Billboard 200	1

=== Year-end charts ===
2021 year-end chart performance for 30
Chart (2021)	Position
Australian Albums (ARIA)	2
Austrian Albums (Ö3 Austria)	4
Belgian Albums (Ultratop Flanders)	2
Belgian Albums (Ultratop Wallonia)	6
Danish Albums (Hitlisten)	47
Dutch Albums (Album Top 100)	1
French Albums (SNEP)	6
German Albums (Offizielle Top 100)	7
Hungarian Albums (MAHASZ)	39
Icelandic Albums (Tónlistinn)	24
Irish Albums (IRMA)	3
Italian Albums (FIMI)	40
New Zealand Albums (RMNZ)	2
Norwegian Albums (VG-lista)	23
Polish Albums (ZPAV)	7
Portuguese Albums (AFP)	3
Spanish Albums (PROMUSICAE)	15
Swedish Albums (Sverigetopplistan)	19
Swiss Albums (Schweizer Hitparade)	2
UK Albums (OCC)	1
Worldwide Albums (IFPI Global Music Report)	1

2022 year-end chart performance for 30
Chart (2022)	Position
Australian Albums (ARIA)	13
Austrian Albums (Ö3 Austria)	41
Belgian Albums (Ultratop Flanders)	7
Belgian Albums (Ultratop Wallonia)	15
Canadian Albums (Billboard)	1
Danish Albums (Hitlisten)	33
Dutch Albums (Album Top 100)	4
French Albums (SNEP)	38
German Albums (Offizielle Top 100)	10
Hungarian Albums (MAHASZ)	57
Icelandic Albums (Tónlistinn)	19
Italian Albums (FIMI)	59
Lithuanian Albums (AGATA)	12
New Zealand Albums (RMNZ)	13
Polish Albums (ZPAV)	39
Portuguese Albums (AFP)	12
Spanish Albums (PROMUSICAE)	34
Swedish Albums (Sverigetopplistan)	10
Swiss Albums (Schweizer Hitparade)	7
UK Albums (OCC)	14
US Billboard 200	2

2023 year-end chart performance for 30
Chart (2023)	Position
Belgian Albums (Ultratop Flanders)	72
Dutch Albums (Album Top 100)	61
French Albums (SNEP)	190
Icelandic Albums (Tónlistinn)	74
Polish Albums (ZPAV)	73
Swedish Albums (Sverigetopplistan)	72

2024 year-end chart performance for 30
Chart (2024)	Position
Belgian Albums (Ultratop Flanders)	88

== Certifications and sales ==
Certifications for 30, with pure sales where available
Region	Certification	Certified units/sales
Australia (ARIA)	Platinum	70,000^{‡}
Austria (IFPI Austria)	Platinum	15,000^{‡}
Belgium (BRMA)	Platinum	20,000^{‡}
Brazil (Pro-Música Brasil)	2× Platinum	80,000^{‡}
Canada (Music Canada)	3× Platinum	240,000^{‡}
Chile (IFPI Chile)	Gold	3,500 (Note: Chilean pure sales as of December 2021)
Denmark (IFPI Danmark)	2× Platinum	40,000^{‡}
France (SNEP)	3× Platinum	300,000 (Note: French pure sales as of July 2023)
Germany (BVMI)	Platinum	200,000^{‡}
Hungary (MAHASZ)	Platinum	4,000^{‡}
Italy (FIMI)	Platinum	50,000^{‡}
Japan	—	26,454
Mexico (AMPROFON)	Platinum	140,000^{‡}
New Zealand (RMNZ)	4× Platinum	60,000^{‡}
Poland (ZPAV)	4× Platinum	80,000^{‡}
Portugal (AFP)	Gold	7,500^{^}
Spain (Promusicae)	Platinum	40,000^{‡}
Sweden (GLF)	2× Platinum	60,000^{‡}
Switzerland (IFPI Switzerland)	Platinum	20,000^{‡}
United Kingdom (BPI)	3× Platinum	900,000^{‡}
United States (RIAA)	3× Platinum	3,000,000^{‡}
Summaries
Worldwide (IFPI)	—	5,000,000 (Note: Global pure sales by December 2021)
^{^} Shipments figures based on certification alone.^{‡} Sales+streaming figures based on certification alone.

== Release history ==
Release date and formats for 30
Region	Date	Label	Format(s)	Ref.
Various	19 November 2021	Columbia	Cassette; CD; digital download; streaming; vinyl	

== See also ==
- List of Billboard 200 number-one albums of 2021
- List of Billboard 200 number-one albums of 2022
- List of UK Albums Chart number ones of the 2020s
- List of UK Album Downloads Chart number ones of the 2020s
- List of number-one albums of 2021 (Australia)
- List of number-one albums of 2022 (Australia)
- List of number-one albums of 2021 (Canada)
- List of number-one albums of 2022 (Canada)
- List of number-one albums of 2021 (Ireland)
- List of number-one albums from the 2020s (New Zealand)
- List of number-one albums in Norway
