= Oh My God (Adele song) =

2021 single by Adele

Single by Adele

from the album 30
- Released: 29 November 2021
- Studio: No Expectations Studios (Los Angeles, CA)
- Genre: Pop
- Length: 3:45
- Label: Columbia
- Songwriters: Adele Adkins; Greg Kurstin
- Producer: Greg Kurstin

Adele singles chronology
"Easy on Me" (2021)	"Oh My God" (2021)	"I Drink Wine" (2022)

Music video
- "Oh My God" on YouTube

"Oh My God" is a song by English singer Adele from her fourth studio album, 30 (2021). Adele wrote the song alongside the producer Greg Kurstin. Columbia Records released it to US adult contemporary radio stations, as the album's second single, on 29 November 2021. A pop song with influences of R&B and a dance-pop chorus, it has lyrics about Adele's desire to start dating again and being guarded while beginning a relationship with a new love interest.

"Oh My God" received generally positive reviews from music critics, most of whom praised its catchy production and identified the commercial potential. The song reached number one in Israel and Mexico, and the top 10 in several countries, including the United Kingdom, the United States, Canada, Australia, and New Zealand. Sam Brown directed its music video, which was positively received and features religious imagery and Adele clad in designer outfits. She performed the song during her British Summer Time concerts.

== Background and release ==
Adele began working on her fourth studio album by 2018. She filed for divorce from her husband Simon Konecki in September 2019, which inspired the album. After experiencing anxiety, Adele undertook therapy sessions and mended her estranged relationship with her father. Single again for the first time in almost 10 years, she sought a serious relationship in Los Angeles but struggled to find one. To Adele's displeasure, her friends would set her up on blind dates, but it did not work as she feared having the paparazzi called on her. She decided to have regular conversations with her son, which inspired her return to the studio and the album took shape as a body of work that would explain to him why she left his father.

Adele co-wrote the song "Oh My God" with its producer Greg Kurstin, who had produced three songs for her third studio album 25 (2015)—"Hello", "Million Years Ago", and "Water Under the Bridge". "Oh My God" is about her desire to get back into the dating pool, but struggling to achieve this due to her celebrity status. Adele stated the song is "about the first time that [she] basically left [her] house after [her] anxiety and stuff like that started to sort of subside". She struggled with dating and wrote it about adjusting to flirting she received as a newly single person: "'do you mind? I'm married.' And my friends were like, 'but you're not.' And I was like, 'oh shit. OK, oh my God.'"

Adele released "Easy on Me" as the lead single from the album, entitled 30, on 14 October 2021. She announced the album's tracklist on 1 November 2021, which included "Oh My God" as the fifth track. It became available for digital download on 30, which was released on 19 November. "Oh My God" replaced "I Drink Wine" as the second single from the album, which had been announced in November 2021. In the United States, Columbia Records serviced the song to adult contemporary radio stations on 29 November 2021, and contemporary hit radio stations the following day. It was sent for radio airplay to France on 12 January 2022, and Italy two days later. Adele performed "Oh My God" during her British Summer Time concerts on 1 and 2 July 2022.

== Composition and lyrics ==
"Oh My God" is three minutes and 45 seconds long. Kurstin produced and engineered the song. He plays the bass, Hammond B3 organ, keyboards, percussion, piano, and provides the claps and drum programming; Adele plays the tambourine; and Chris Dave plays the drums. Julian Burg and Alex Pasco engineered the song at No Expectations Studios in Los Angeles; Serban Ghenea, John Hanes, and Bryce Bordone mixed it at MixStar Studios in Virginia Beach, Virginia; and Randy Merrill handled mastering at Sterling Sound in New Jersey.

Musically, "Oh My God" is a gospel pop song, with elements of R&B. Clash's Robin Murray described the song as "sheer gospel abandon", while Consequence's Mary Siroky and Glenn Rowley believed it "incorporates more R&B sounds". The instrumentation incorporates claps, keys, organ, "rumbling" bass, and whistles. Adele employs vocal harmonies reminiscent of typical gospel and soul patterns, along with jazz and swing. Ilana Kaplan of Rolling Stone felt that "Oh My God" has a dance-pop chorus and "Afrobeat-inspired" verses. Music columnist Bruno Tummers said on RTBF that she combines her vocal identity with new sonorities whilst retaining her soul roots in the song. He said it stands out from her "melancholic universe". Adele sings parts of it with a staccato, along with sped-up background vocals, which Mikael Wood of the Los Angeles Times thought were "processed nearly beyond recognition". NME's El Hunt described "Oh My God" as a "helium-charged" song reminiscent of Sault, and The Guardian's Alexis Petridis thought it offered an unprocessed take on the "stomping rhythm" included in the verses of "Rolling in the Deep" (2010).

"Oh My God" has lyrics about Adele's desire to enjoy herself, which she has not had the chance to do in the past: "I know that it's wrong/ But I want to have fun". The song explores the topic of wanting to "put yourself out there", and the difficulties she has faced while doing so due to her fame. Adele sings about hookups and fulfilling her sexual needs without shame. It discusses being guarded while falling in love with a new person, whom Elle speculated might be Rich Paul, a sports agent she was dating at the time of its release. Adele expresses shock at this new encounter and wonders if she is still too hurt to begin flirting already. Some lyrics of "Oh My God" describe her finding fulfilment in being newly single: "I am a grown woman, and I do what I want to do."

== Critical reception ==
After 30's release, Consequence chose "Oh My God" as "Song of the Week". Their writers Siroky and Rowley described the song's lyrics about internal conflict as "refreshing", and thought it strayed from other songs on the album. "Oh My God" was met with generally positive reviews from music critics, who mostly praised its production's catchiness. Variety's Chris Willman commented that the song's "four-on-the-floor beat and some electro-squiggles" were the nearest Kurstin got to making music suited to the year 2021 without sounding too out of place on 30. Jon Pareles of The New York Times described it as a "foot-stomper", and Spin's Bobby Olivier called the song "pulsating and catchy". Writing for AllMusic, Neil Z. Yeung foresaw commercial success for "Oh My God", and noted that it "rides an infectious beat peppered with handclaps and whistles". Consequence's Ilana Kaplan found the song smouldering and well-suited for clubs. Kyle Mullin of Exclaim! was positive about its "understated stomping percussion" and thought Adele's staccato delivery was entrancing. For The Guardian, Kitty Empire found the production of "Oh My God" playful. The Telegraph's Neil McCormick wrote that the song's vocal harmonies are "carefully stacked" and Adele "absolutely roll[s] in the deep blues". Wood thought its unrecognisable processing of her vocals was a surprising choice given her reputation for stellar vocals.

Some critics identified "Oh My God" as one of the more radio-friendly tracks on 30. The A.V. Club's Gabrielle Sanchez wrote that, along with "Can I Get It", it constituted the "most pop-oriented and straightforward" segment of 30, and the use of steady handclaps drove them to be "the most uptempo section". Jill Mapes of Pitchfork thought "Oh My God" stylistically lays somewhere between the work of Ed Sheeran and Florence Welch, but Adele's vocal tics introduce personality. Eric Mason of Slant Magazine thought Adele explored a more modern sound on the song, but "with mixed results", and added that its production "feels somewhat sanitized, like the accompaniment to a car commercial". The Line of Best Fit's David Cobbald was critical and believed it was too removed from Adele's wheelhouse: "It's an arresting half-assed chant of a song that doesn't go far enough to be believable, employing a strange use of intonation and word placement that makes it one of the least memorable on the album."

== Commercial performance ==
"Oh My God" debuted at number two on the UK Singles Chart issued for 26 November 2021, on which Adele also placed "Easy on Me" at number one and "I Drink Wine" at number four. "Oh My God" received a Platinum certification in the United Kingdom from the British Phonographic Industry in September 2023, denoting 600,000 units moved. The song peaked at number five on the US Billboard Hot 100, becoming her eighth top-10 on the chart, and the Recording Industry Association of America certified it Platinum in the US on June 29, 2022. It reached number eight on the Canadian Hot 100.

In Australia, "Oh My God" charted at number six and the Australian Recording Industry Association certified it Platinum in 2022. In New Zealand, the song debuted at number four and received a Platinum certification from Recorded Music NZ on 11 August 2022. Elsewhere, it peaked within the top five, at number one in Israel and Mexico, number two in Belgium and Sweden, number three on the Billboard Global 200, in Ireland, and Lithuania, number four in Iceland, and number five in the Czech Republic and Croatia. "Oh My God" further earned Gold certifications in France, Italy, Portugal, and Switzerland.

== Music video ==
Sam Brown, who had previously directed the music video for "Rolling in the Deep", also directed the one for "Oh My God", which was shot on 14 October 2021. Adele shared a teaser of it on her Twitter account on 6 January 2022, and the video premiered on YouTube on 12 January. The black and white video features various versions of Adele performing the song in a room filled with wooden chairs, accompanied by backup dancers. In it, Adele successively wears three custom outfits by Harris Reed, Louis Vuitton, a scarlet red satin corset designed by Vivienne Westwood, and a Cartier diamond necklace. The latter half of the video features religious imagery, and Adele in a Louis Vuitton outfit designed by Nicolas Ghesquière, integrating a golden brocade dress, a short white cape, and black leather opera gloves, surrounded by a halo of light.

The video received positive reviews from critics. Elle's Erica Gonzales viewed it as "a gorgeous visual display" and complimented Adele's fashion choices in it: "Adele is clearly the star, dressed in elegant gowns (including a custom Vivienne Westwood number) and perfectly-styled updos." Bria McNeal of Nylon thought the visuals were "stunning" and marked the beginning of a more vulnerable era for Adele, taking its viewers on "a winding journey". Writing for Billboard, Gil Kaufman described the video as dramatic and thought Adele portrayed a character reminiscent of Eve. It was nominated for the MTV Video Music Award for Best Art Direction at the 2022 ceremony.

== Credits and personnel ==
Credits are adapted from the liner notes of 30.

- Greg Kurstin – producer, songwriter, engineering, bass, claps, drum programming, Hammond B3 organ, keyboards, percussion, piano
- Adele – songwriter, tambourine
- Julian Burg – engineering
- Alex Pasco – engineering
- Chris Dave – drums
- Serban Ghenea – mixing
- John Hanes – mixing
- Bryce Bordone – mixing
- Randy Merrill – mastering

== Charts ==
=== Weekly charts ===
Weekly chart positions for "Oh My God"
Chart (2021–2022)	Peak position
Australia (ARIA)	6
Austria (Ö3 Austria Top 40)	17
Belgium (Ultratop 50 Flanders)	12
Belgium (Ultratop 50 Wallonia)	2
Canada Hot 100 (Billboard)	8
Canada CHR/Top 40 (Billboard)	6
Canada Hot AC (Billboard)	7
Czech Republic Airplay (ČNS IFPI)	5
Czech Republic Singles Digital (ČNS IFPI)	28
Croatia International Airplay (Top lista)	5
Denmark (Tracklisten)	11
Finland (Suomen virallinen lista)	6
France (SNEP)	48
Germany (GfK)	24
Global 200 (Billboard)	3
Greece International (IFPI)	7
Hungary (Rádiós Top 40)	38
Hungary (Single Top 40)	30
Hungary (Stream Top 40)	20
Iceland (Tónlistinn)	4
Ireland (IRMA)	3
Israel (Media Forest)	1
Italy (FIMI)	62
Lebanon (Lebanese Top 20)	19
Lithuania (AGATA)	3
Mexico (Billboard Mexican Airplay)	1
Netherlands (Dutch Top 40)	19
Netherlands (Single Top 100)	6
New Zealand (Recorded Music NZ)	4
Norway (VG-lista)	6
Poland Airplay (ZPAV)	31
Portugal (AFP)	10
San Marino (SMRRTV Top 50)	12
Slovakia Airplay (ČNS IFPI)	28
Slovakia (Singles Digitál Top 100)	26
South Africa (RISA)	9
Spain (Promusicae)	38
Suriname (Nationale Top 40)	2
Sweden (Sverigetopplistan)	2
Switzerland (Schweizer Hitparade)	7
UK Singles (Official Charts)	2
US Billboard Hot 100	5
US Adult Contemporary (Billboard)	10
US Adult Pop Airplay (Billboard)	8
US Dance Airplay (Billboard)	40
US Pop Airplay (Billboard)	11
US Rock & Alternative Airplay (Billboard)	37

=== Year-end charts ===
2022 year-end chart positions for "Oh My God"
Chart (2022)	Position
Belgium (Ultratop 50 Flanders)	79
Belgium (Ultratop 50 Wallonia)	21
Canada (Canadian Hot 100)	44
France (SNEP)	178
Global 200 (Billboard)	110
Iceland (Tónlistinn)	62
US Billboard Hot 100	72
US Adult Contemporary (Billboard)	19
US Adult Top 40 (Billboard)	24
US Mainstream Top 40 (Billboard)	43

== Certifications ==
Certifications for "Oh My God"
Region	Certification	Certified units/sales
Australia (ARIA)	Platinum	70,000^{‡}
Brazil (Pro-Música Brasil)	Diamond	160,000^{‡}
Denmark (IFPI Danmark)	Gold	45,000^{‡}
France (SNEP)	Platinum	200,000^{‡}
Italy (FIMI)	Gold	50,000^{‡}
Mexico (AMPROFON)	Gold	70,000^{‡}
New Zealand (RMNZ)	2× Platinum	60,000^{‡}
Poland (ZPAV)	Platinum	50,000^{‡}
Portugal (AFP)	Gold	5,000^{‡}
Spain (Promusicae)	Platinum	60,000^{‡}
Switzerland (IFPI Switzerland)	Gold	10,000^{‡}
United Kingdom (BPI)	Platinum	600,000^{‡}
United States (RIAA)	Platinum	1,000,000^{‡}
^{‡} Sales+streaming figures based on certification alone.

== Release history ==
Release history for "Oh My God"
Region	Date	Format(s)	Label(s)	Ref.
United States	29 November 2021	Adult contemporary radio	Columbia	
United States	30 November 2021	Contemporary hit radio	Columbia	
France	12 January 2022	Radio airplay	Columbia	
Italy	14 January 2022	Radio airplay	Sony	
