= Easy on Me =

2021 single by Adele

Single by Adele

from the album 30
- Released: 15 October 2021
- Studio: No Expectations; The EastWood Scoring Stage (Los Angeles, California)
- Length: 3:44
- Label: Columbia
- Songwriters: Adele Adkins; Greg Kurstin
- Producer: Greg Kurstin

Adele singles chronology
"Water Under the Bridge" (2016)	"Easy on Me" (2021)	"Oh My God" (2021)

Chris Stapleton singles chronology
"I Bet You Think About Me" (2021)	"Easy on Me" (2021)	"Joy of My Life" (2022)

Music video
- "Easy on Me" on YouTube

"Easy on Me" is a song by the English singer Adele from her fourth studio album, 30 (2021). Adele wrote the song with its producer, Greg Kurstin. Columbia Records released it as the album's lead single on 15 October 2021. It is a torch song and ballad which places emphasis on Adele's vocals, set over progressively louder-growing piano instrumentation. In its lyrics, she addresses her divorce and pleads for forgiveness and understanding from her son, ex-husband, and herself.

"Easy on Me" received acclaim from music critics, who discussed it in relation to Adele's previous music and praised her vocals and the lyrics. At the 65th Annual Grammy Awards, the song won Best Pop Solo Performance from its four nominations. It was nominated for several other awards and won the 2022 Brit Award for Song of the Year. "Easy on Me" reached number 1 on the charts in 30 territories, becoming Adele's longest-running chart topper in the United Kingdom and the United States. It was the sixth-bestselling song of 2022 in the world and was certified multi-platinum in 15 countries, including Diamond in Brazil and France.

Xavier Dolan directed the music video for "Easy on Me", which was released on 15 October 2021. It references several previous Adele videos and depicts her moving out of the same house where the "Hello" (2015) music video was filmed. She performed the song at the 23rd NRJ Music Awards, on her television specials, and at the concert residency Weekends with Adele. Artists including Kanye West and the Sunday Service Choir, Chloe Bailey, and Keith Urban sang cover versions of it.

== Background ==
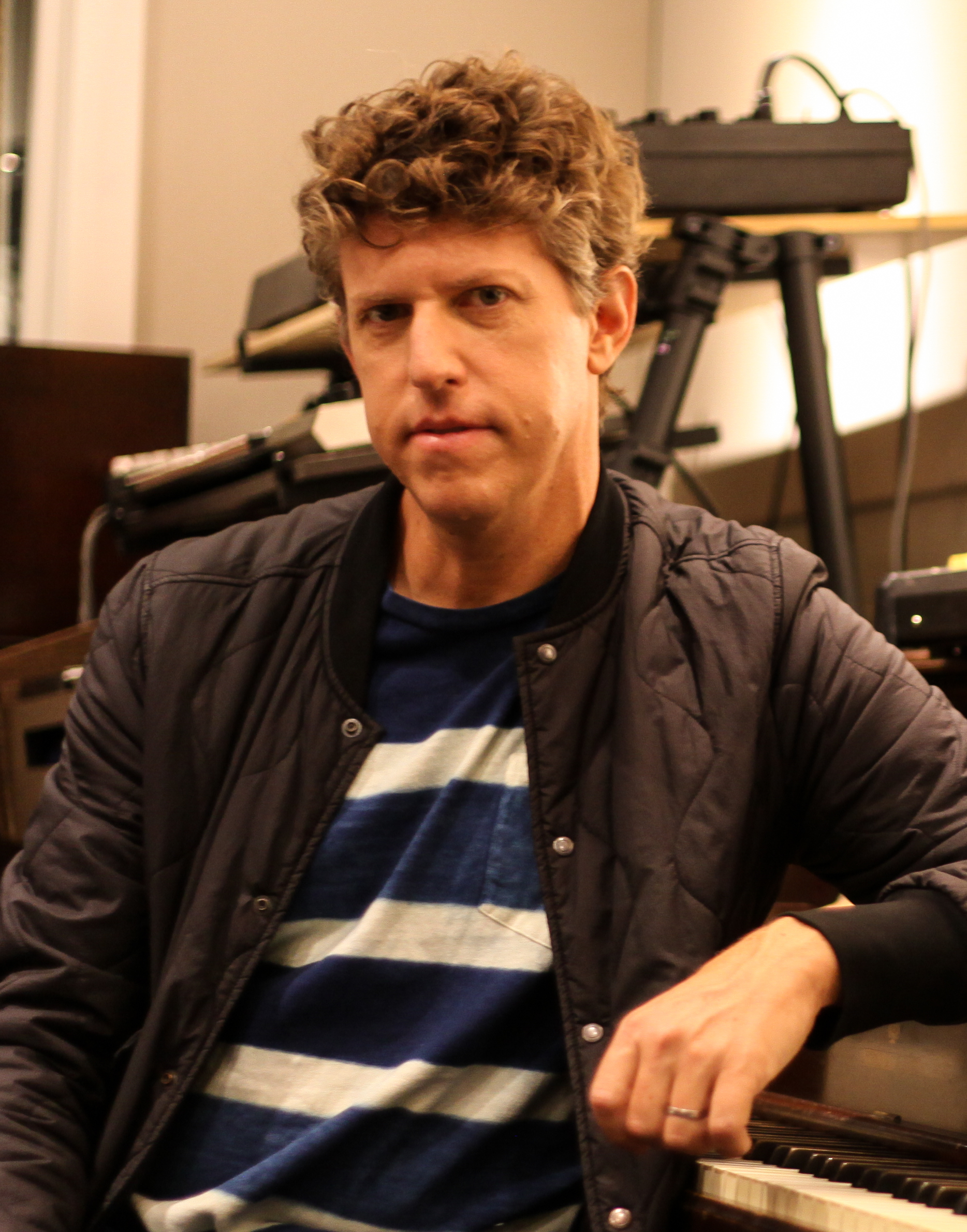
Greg Kurstin (pictured in 2017) produced and co-wrote "Easy on Me".

Greg Kurstin produced and co-wrote three tracks on Adele's third studio album, 25 (2015), which included the song "Hello". It was released as the lead single from the album and reached number one in 36 countries, and its music video broke the Vevo record for most single-day views. She kept a low profile after completing the associated concert tour, Adele Live 2016, in 2017. Adele had begun working on the follow-up album by the following year. She filed for divorce from her husband, Simon Konecki, in September 2019, which inspired the album. After experiencing anxiety, Adele undertook therapy sessions and mended her estranged relationship with her father. The divorce's effect on her son plagued Adele during the following years. She decided to have regular conversations with him, which she recorded following advice from her therapist. These conversations inspired Adele's return to the studio, and the album took shape as a body of work that would explain to her son why she left his father.

Adele wrote "Easy on Me" with its producer, Kurstin. She conceived the song's verses while taking a shower. Adele's friends would tell her to "go easy on yourself, don't beat yourself up too much about your decisions". The advice resonated with her, and she decided that she had to be more gentle with herself. Adele's friends were unimpressed by an initial snippet of it but she claimed that they appreciated her patience. Three songs were in contention for release as the lead single from 30 (2021). She eventually chose "Easy on Me" because it had a "soaring chorus" and "just felt like a me song"; she saw it as the right song for her return after the hiatus. Adele wanted to avoid releasing something that would propel her to more stardom: "There isn't a bombastic 'Hello,' But I don't want another song like that. That song catapulted me in fame to another level that I don't want to happen again."

== Composition ==
"Easy on Me" is 3 minutes and 44 seconds long. Kurstin produced the song and engineered it with Alex Pasco and Julian Burg. Kurstin plays bass guitar, kick drum, and piano. Tom Elmhirst helmed the song's mixing at Electric Lady Studios in New York, and Randy Merrill handled mastering at Sterling Sound in New Jersey.

"Easy on Me" is a torch song and ballad which places emphasis on Adele's vocals over piano instrumentation. The song opens with a gentle piano, which intensifies as it progresses, leading into the vocals. Adele's voice mimics this according to The Guardian's Alexis Petridis, as it "sounds initially wounded, then soars". The song almost completely eschews the use of percussion instruments, but a bass drum and bass guitar are played during its latter half. In the chorus, Adele delivers the song title in elongated vocal runs and stretches the "e" sound through eight different musical notes. Mikael Wood of the Los Angeles Times described her performance as "soaring yet slightly crinkly around the edges".

In the lyrics, Adele addresses her divorce and asks for forgiveness and understanding from her son, ex-husband, and herself. She tries to explain to her son why she chose to disassemble the stable life he had during her marriage. Adele acknowledges that she still has a lot of self-discovery to do and compares herself to a child: "I was still a child / Didn't get the chance to / Feel the world around me." According to Slant Magazine's Alexa Camp, the lyric reflects her "grappling with a form of arrested development". In the song's bridge, Adele asserts that the divorce was well-intentioned and in the hopes of a better future. Neil McCormick of The Daily Telegraph described the song as "effectively, a huge, abject, shame- and excuse-filled apology".

== Release ==
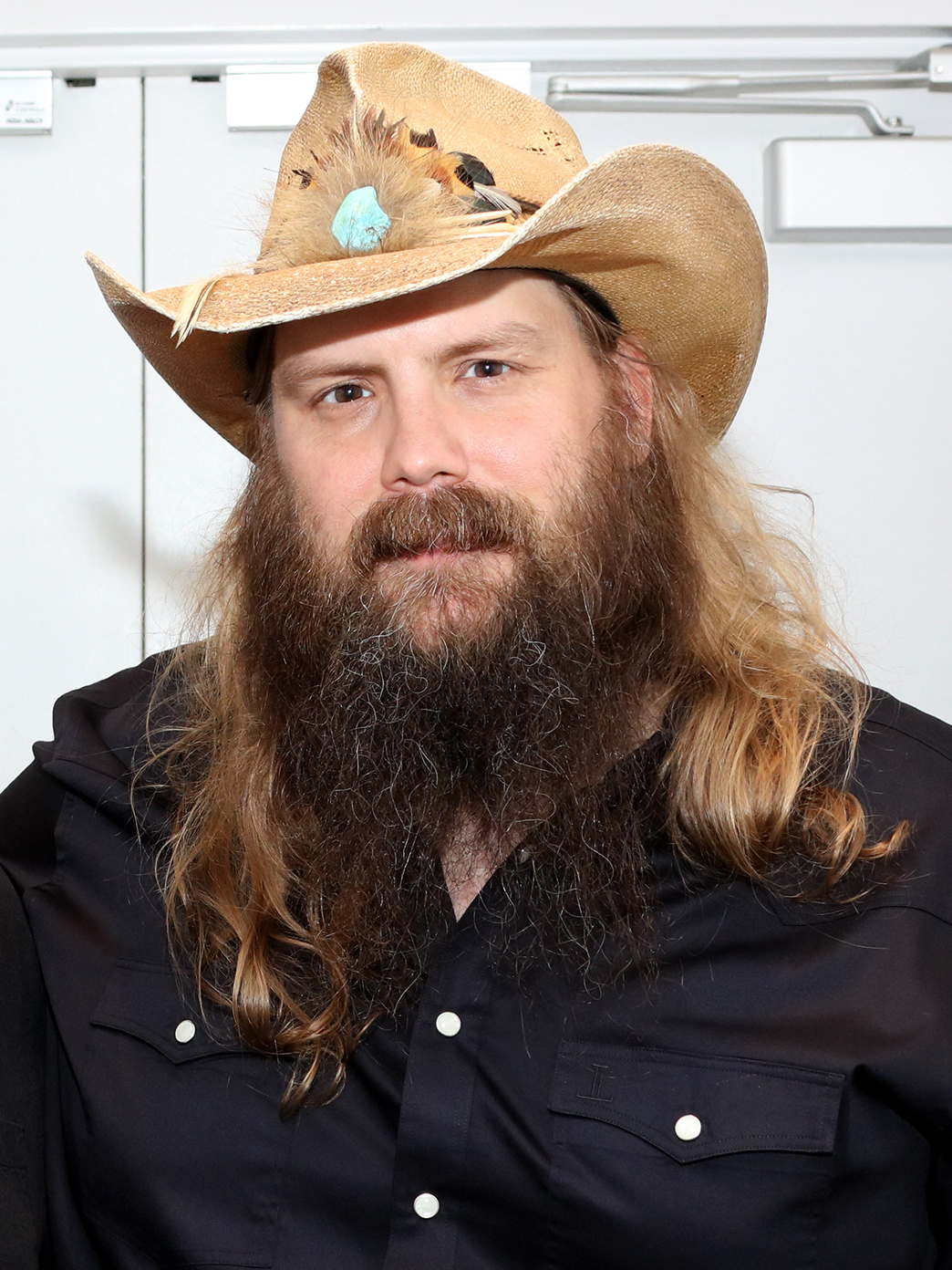
Adele recorded a duet version of "Easy on Me" with Chris Stapleton (pictured in 2019).

On 1 October 2021, the number "30" was projected on several buildings and landmarks around the world. Three days later, Adele updated her social media accounts for the first time in months. On 5 October, Adele hinted at the song and its music video by posting a teaser on the accounts. The black-and-white clip played an instrumental track and depicted Adele putting a cassette into the tape deck of a truck. On 9 October, Adele shared a 40-second preview of it via Instagram Live. "Easy on Me" was released on 15 October and marked her first single in nearly five years. Sony Music sent it for radio airplay in Italy the same day.

In the United States, Columbia Records released "Easy on Me" to adult contemporary and triple A stations on 18 October, and contemporary hit radio the following day. The song was issued as a CD single in Germany on 22 October. Columbia released a cassette single on 5 November 2021. Adele recorded a duet version of it with Chris Stapleton, which was sent to country radio by In2une Nashville on 19 November. (Note: Adele has stated that she had been a fan of Stapleton for several years before the collaboration. She recalled performing cover versions of his band The SteelDrivers for twelve years. Her cover of their song "If It Hadn't Been for Love" was included on bonus versions of 21.) With 5.4 million audience impressions, (Note: Audience impressions are a metric calculated by Billboard which measure the impact created by a play on the radio, taking into account the time and size of the station.) this version became Adele's first entry on the Country Airplay chart at number 25. Billboard's Gary Trust wrote that it made "unprecedented airplay chart history". In October 2021, Ocado noted a 26 percent increase in tissue sales in the United Kingdom and connected this to the release of "Easy on Me", along with the cool weather: "We also suspect Adele's new song about heartbreak may have also had something to do with it."

== Critical reception ==
Professional ratings
Review scores
Source	Rating
The Daily Telegraph	5/5 stars
Evening Standard	5/5 stars
The Guardian	3/5 stars
i	4/5 stars
The Independent	4/5 stars
NME	5/5 stars
The Times	4/5 stars

"Easy on Me" received critical acclaim from music critics. Some commented on the production. McCormick thought the song was a daring return for Adele and exemplified the sheer crux of "what music is, and why it means so much to us". Fiona Sturges of i believed it is wholehearted, anthemic, and places emphasis on Adele's voice, but it has a "slightly over-produced sheen" which reduces its sadness. Likewise, The Times' Will Hodgkinson thought "Easy on Me" was fine and seasoned but "a sheen of thoroughly American professionalism" prevented its emotional resonance.

Critics discussed "Easy on Me" in relation to Adele's catalogue. Some thought it was a typical Adele song. (Note: Cited to the Evening Standard, The Guardian, Pitchfork, and Clash) The Evening Standard's Jochan Embley believed it did not compare to the sadness of "Someone Like You" (2011) or the emotion of "Hello" but was equally ardent. Alexandra Pollard of The Independent thought it did not have a catchy melody like "Hello" but was just as sad and pithy and more intricate. Petridis stated that it would not "stop the listener in their tracks" like "Someone Like You" but was relatable and more memorable than some tracks on 25. Billboard's Jason Lipshutz likened several elements of "Easy on Me" to prior Adele songs but thought it was distinguished by its different lyrical theme.

Adele's vocals were the subject of commentary. Embley believed they were some of her best: "She's so elegantly controlled, so piercingly poignant". NME's Nick Levine thought the song delivered to the high expectations due to her prowess in communicating unvarnished emotion through her vocals and lyricism. He added that Adele sounds undoubtedly and magnificently like herself but "richer and more confident". Cat Zhang of Pitchfork praised her delivery and said it is distinctive at a time when under-singing is popular. She added that despite dealing with a new breakup, Adele provides the same contentment. Writing for Rolling Stone, Rob Sheffield thought she sang with more panache and delicacy but did not eschew "the primal firepower" that famed her. PopMatters's Peter Piatkowski stated that with her usual pristine performance, she exudes the immense sorrow she experiences and moulds her great and pliable voice.

Some discussed the lyrics. Chris Willman of Variety believed that the theme of asking for forgiveness strayed from Adele's previous releases, portraying her as "the possible offendee, not the offended". Writing for The Line of Best Fit, David Cobbald thought it was "the most 'hunny'" song on 30. He noted its metaphors about water and opined it conveys a maturity and headway from the time of 25. Piatkowski believed that the lyrics were foreseeably intense and portrayed "genuine and elegiac" pain. Levine opined the lyrics will relate with "anyone going through a quarter-life crisis, a mid-life crisis, or just a crisis of a hangover" and were likely to make them cry easily.

=== Accolades ===
"Easy on Me" has been included in rankings of Adele's discography. Rolling Stone named it her 10th-best song in 2021. That same year, American Songwriter's Tina Benitez-Eves declared "Easy on Me" Adele's best song. It was included on critical lists of the best songs of 2021, by Billboard at number 14, The Forty-Five and NME at number 26, and Consequence at number 27. The song also appeared in an unranked list by Vogue.

"Easy on Me" received several awards and nominations. It won the Brit Award for Song of the Year at the 2022 ceremony. That year, "Easy on Me" also received the Gaffa Award for Foreign Song of the Year, the Juno Award for Video of the Year, and the New Music Award for Top 40/CHR Song of the Year. At the 65th Annual Grammy Awards in 2023, the song won Best Pop Solo Performance and was nominated for Record of the Year, Song of the Year, and Best Music Video. Other nominations include The Song of 2021 and The Music Video of 2021 at the 47th People's Choice Awards, Favourite Pop Song and Favourite Music Video at the American Music Awards of 2022, Song of the Year and Best Lyrics at the 2022 iHeartRadio Music Awards, the Ivor Novello Award for Best Song Musically and Lyrically, and the MTV Video Music Award for Song of the Year.

== Commercial performance ==
Upon release, "Easy on Me" achieved success on streaming platforms. It became the most streamed song on Spotify, both in a day (Note: Surpassed by Mariah Carey's "All I Want for Christmas is You" in 2022) and a single week. (Note: Surpassed by Miley Cyrus's "Flowers" in 2023) In the United Kingdom, "Easy on Me" opened with 3.2 million Spotify streams, the most received by any song in a day. It also broke the record for the most streamed song in a single week in the country, with 24 million streams. On Amazon Music, it earned the most first-day streams globally and the most first-day Alexa requests for any song in the platform's history. "Easy on Me" debuted at number 195 on the Billboard Global 200 with just five hours of tracking and became Adele's first song to reach the chart's summit the following week. That week, it sold 136,300 downloads, the third-largest sales week for any song on that chart, and earned 178.2 million streams, the second-largest streaming week. It also became the second number one song in history to double the chart points of the number two.

In the United States, "Easy on Me" debuted at number 68 on the Billboard Hot 100 with its first five hours of tracking. The following week, it became Adele's fifth chart-topping single. It also debuted at number one on the Digital Song Sales and Streaming Songs charts, and number four on Radio Songs where it earned the highest debut ever. "Easy on Me" recorded the most first-week plays among all songs in US radio history and became the first to be most-added on five radio formats in a single week. Billboard named it one of the biggest number one singles "of the last 30 years". The song reached number one on the Billboard Adult Contemporary airplay chart, becoming Adele's sixth leader on the list and had the quickest trajectory to number one for a non-holiday song since "Hello". During its sixth week on the Hot 100, Adele earned simultaneous top-five placements with "Easy on Me" at number one and "Oh My God" debuting at number five. "Easy on Me" stayed at number one for 10 weeks, tying "Hello" as Adele's longest-running number one song on the Hot 100. In its fourteenth week, "Easy on Me" became the first song to surpass 100 million in radio reach since the Weeknd's "Blinding Lights" (2019) one and a half year earlier. The Recording Industry Association of America certified it 4× Platinum in November 2022.

In the United Kingdom, "Easy on Me" debuted at number one on the Official Singles Chart on the chart issued for 28 October 2021. With 217,300 units, it marked the highest first-week sales for any song since 2017. "Easy on Me" spent eight nonconsecutive weeks at number one, becoming her longest-running number one single in the UK. The British Phonographic Industry certified it 4× Platinum in March 2025. "Easy on Me" debuted atop Australia's ARIA Singles Chart, becoming her third song to reach the position. It spent four weeks at the summit and received a 6× Platinum certification from the Australian Recording Industry Association. In Canada, "Easy on Me" spent eight weeks at number one on the Canadian Hot 100. Music Canada certified it 3× Platinum in January 2022. Elsewhere, "Easy on Me" reached number one in Austria, Belgium, Costa Rica, Croatia, Czech Republic, Denmark, Germany, Iceland, Ireland, Israel, Italy, Lithuania, Malaysia, the Netherlands, New Zealand, Norway, Singapore, Slovakia, South Africa, Sweden, and Switzerland. The song was certified 2× Diamond in Brazil, Diamond in France, 5× Platinum in New Zealand, 4× Platinum in Mexico, 3× Platinum in Denmark, Poland, Portugal, and Switzerland, 2× Platinum in Italy and Sweden, Platinum in Belgium, Germany, Spain, and Greece, and Gold in Austria.

== Music video ==
Xavier Dolan, who had previously directed the music video for "Hello", also directed the one for "Easy on Me". The latter was filmed in the same house as "Hello", at the Chemin Jordan and Domaine Dumont Chapelle Ste-Agnès in Sutton, Quebec, on 15 and 16 September 2021. The video starts black-and-white before changing to full colour midway. According to Camp, it "picks up where 'Hello' left off". Adele gazes across the empty house and outside the window before packing up her belongings, putting on sunglasses, and moving out. She talks with someone on a mobile phone and inserts a cassette into the tape deck of a furniture truck, which plays "Easy on Me". Adele mourns the end of her own marriage while driving away and spectating a separate couple's engagement celebration as several pages of sheet music fly out of the car's windows.

The video was released on 15 October 2021 at midnight UK time to 200,000 viewers during the premiere. It reached 12 million views within 12 hours and 90 million within six days of release. Several critics thought it referenced other Adele music videos, including "Hello", "Rolling in the Deep" (2010), and "Chasing Pavements" (2008). Parade's Rose Maura Lorre described it as a sequel to "Hello" and compared a chair in it to the one in the "Rolling in the Deep" music video. Sophia McFarland of The Spokesman-Review believed it was "a cinematic masterpiece in itself". BBC News' Mark Savage opined that the transition from black and white to colour represented "the sound of a woman who has dismantled her entire world, realising that she needn't feel guilty for putting herself first". A video of bloopers from the production of the music video was released on 4 November 2021.

== Live performances and cover versions ==
Adele performed "Easy on Me" live for the first time during her CBS special Adele One Night Only (2021). She reprised the song at the 23rd NRJ Music Awards on 20 November 2021. Adele hit an incorrect note during her first attempt at singing it for her ITV special An Audience with Adele (2021) and restarted the performance: "I'm shitting myself." She performed "Easy on Me" during her British Summer Time concerts on 1 and 2 July 2022. Adele included the song in the set list for Weekends with Adele, her 2022–2023 concert residency. She wore a full-length black gown and sang afront a coral green backdrop. Reviewing the show on 18 November 2022, The New York Times' Lindsay Zoladz believed Adele seemed nervous and "relied a bit too heavily on encouraging the crowd to sing her lyrics", and Harper's Bazaar's Bianca Betancourt thought she "appeared visibly emotional" before it.

Several artists recorded cover versions of "Easy on Me". Kanye West and the Sunday Service Choir performed a cover with changed lyrics, as a tribute to Virgil Abloh after he died on 28 November 2021. Chloe Bailey uploaded a cover of the song on 9 December 2021, which included whistle tones and vocal runs; Uproxx's Wongo Okon commented that she sang the challenging song without any problems. On 4 January 2022, Travis Barker released a cover, on which he played the drums and guitar and transformed it into a rock ballad. The Vitamin String Quartet, whose violin player Leah Zeger had accompanied Adele during the One Night Only performance, released a version of "Easy on Me" with string instruments on 4 March 2022. Keith Urban introduced his acoustic guitar cover of the song during a March 2022 show: "I would like to make a special dedication tonight, to somebody I just absolutely adore as a performer, as a songwriter, a trailblazer, [...] We love you Adele, oh yes we do." In July 2023, 13-year-old musician Nandi Bushell shared her cover of it; she noted in the caption that it was her first video singing and playing piano simultaneously. "Easy on Me" has also been covered by contestants on The Voice.

== Credits and personnel ==
Credits are adapted from the liner notes of 30.

- Greg Kurstin – producer, engineer, bass guitar, kick drum, piano
- Adele – vocals, songwriter
- Alex Pasco – engineer
- Julian Burg – engineer
- Matt Scatchell – assistant engineer
- Randy Merrill – mastering
- Tom Elmhirst – mixing

== Charts ==
=== Weekly charts ===
2021–2023 weekly chart performance
Chart (2021–2023)	Peak position
Argentina Hot 100 (Billboard)	45
Argentina Airplay (Monitor Latino)	17
Australia (ARIA)	1
Austria (Ö3 Austria Top 40)	1
Belgium (Ultratop 50 Flanders)	1
Belgium (Ultratop 50 Wallonia)	1
Bolivia Airplay (Monitor Latino)	6
Brazil Airplay (Top 100 Brasil)	43
Brazil Pop International Airplay (Crowley)	1
Bulgaria Airplay (PROPHON)	8
Canada Hot 100 (Billboard)	1
Canada AC (Billboard)	1
Canada CHR/Top 40 (Billboard)	1
Canada Hot AC (Billboard)	1
Central America Streaming (CFC)	3
Chile Airplay (Monitor Latino)	6
CIS Airplay (TopHit)	9
Colombia Airplay (National-Report)	53
Colombia Anglo Airplay (National-Report)	1
Colombia Streaming (APDIF)	6
Costa Rica Airplay (FONOTICA)	8
Costa Rica Airplay (Monitor Latino)	7
Costa Rica Streaming (FONOTICA)	1
Croatia International Airplay (Top lista)	1
Czech Republic Airplay (ČNS IFPI)	1
Czech Republic Singles Digital (ČNS IFPI)	1
Denmark (Tracklisten)	1
Dominican Republic Anglo Airplay (Monitor Latino)	2
Ecuador Airplay (Monitor Latino)	9
Ecuador Airplay (National-Report)	18
El Salvador Airplay (ASAP EGC)	3
Estonia Airplay (Radiomonitor)	7
Euro Digital Song Sales (Billboard)	1
Finland (Suomen virallinen lista)	2
Finland Airplay (Radiosoittolista)	1
France (SNEP)	2
Germany (GfK)	1
Global 200 (Billboard)	1
Greece International (IFPI)	1
Guatemala Airplay (Monitor Latino)	4
Hungary (Rádiós Top 40)	24
Hungary (Single Top 40)	3
Hungary (Stream Top 40)	6
Iceland (Tónlistinn)	1
India International (IMI)	9
Indonesia (Billboard)	5
Ireland (IRMA)	1
Israel International Airplay (Media Forest)	1
Italy (FIMI)	1
Japan Hot 100 (Billboard)	48
Latvia (Latvijas Top 40)	1
Lebanon (Lebanese Top 20)	4
Lithuania (AGATA)	1
Luxembourg (Billboard)	12
Malaysia (RIM)	1
Malta Airplay (Radiomonitor)	2
Mexico Airplay (Billboard)	2
Netherlands (Dutch Top 40)	1
Netherlands (Single Top 100)	1
New Zealand (Recorded Music NZ)	1
Nicaragua Anglo Airplay (Monitor Latino)	3
Nigeria (TurnTable Top 100)	23
Nigeria Airplay (TurnTable)	19
North Macedonia Airplay (Radiomonitor)	1
Norway (VG-lista)	1
Panama Airplay (Monitor Latino)	13
Paraguay Anglo Airplay (Monitor Latino)	6
Peru Anglo Airplay (Monitor Latino)	5
Peru Streaming (UNIMPRO)	23
Philippines (Billboard)	6
Poland Airplay (ZPAV)	11
Portugal (AFP)	2
Puerto Rico Airplay (Monitor Latino)	14
Romania Airplay (Radiomonitor)	15
Russia Airplay (TopHit)	15
San Marino Airplay (SMRTV Top 50)	9
Serbia Airplay (Radiomonitor)	5
Singapore (RIAS)	1
Slovakia Airplay (ČNS IFPI)	2
Slovakia Singles Digital (ČNS IFPI)	1
Slovenia Airplay (Radiomonitor)	1
Spain (Promusicae)	12
Spain Digital Song Sales (Billboard)	2
South Africa Streaming (TOSAC)	1
South Korea (Circle)	89
Suriname (Nationale Top 40)	1
Sweden (Sverigetopplistan)	1
Switzerland (Schweizer Hitparade)	1
Turkey International Airplay (Radiomonitor Türkiye)	4
Ukraine Airplay (TopHit)	78
United Arab Emirates Airplay (Radiomonitor)	4
UK Singles (Official Charts)	1
Uruguay Airplay (Monitor Latino)	10
US Billboard Hot 100	1
US Adult Contemporary (Billboard)	1
US Adult Pop Airplay (Billboard)	1
US Country Airplay (Billboard) with Chris Stapleton	25
US Dance Airplay (Billboard)	6
US Pop Airplay (Billboard)	1
US R&B/Hip-Hop Airplay (Billboard)	18
US Rhythmic Airplay (Billboard)	38
US Rock & Alternative Airplay (Billboard)	33
US Rolling Stone Top 100	1
Venezuela Anglo Airplay (Monitor Latino)	5
Vietnam (Billboard Vietnam Hot 100)	22

2026 weekly chart performance
Chart (2026)	Peak position
Norway Airplay (IFPI Norge)	50

=== Monthly charts ===
2021 monthly chart performance
Chart (2021)	Peak position
CIS Airplay (TopHit)	11
Czech Republic Airplay (ČNS IFPI)	1
Czech Republic Singles Digital (ČNS IFPI)	5
Russia Airplay (TopHit)	16
Slovakia Airplay (ČNS IFPI)	4
Slovakia Singles Digital (ČNS IFPI)	2
South Korea (Circle)	114

2022 monthly chart performance
Chart (2022)	Peak position
CIS Airplay (TopHit)	22
Czech Republic Airplay (ČNS IFPI)	1
Czech Republic Singles Digital (ČNS IFPI)	14
Paraguay Airplay (SGP)	95
Russia Airplay (TopHit)	42
Slovakia Airplay (ČNS IFPI)	2
Slovakia Singles Digital (ČNS IFPI)	16
South Korea (Circle)	161

2023 monthly chart performance
Chart (2023)	Peak position
Czech Republic Airplay (ČNS IFPI)	46
Slovakia Airplay (ČNS IFPI)	96

=== Year-end charts ===
2021 year-end chart performance for "Easy on Me"
Chart (2021)	Position
Australia (ARIA)	33
Austria (Ö3 Austria Top 40)	44
Belgium (Ultratop Flanders)	51
Belgium (Ultratop Wallonia)	65
Canada (Canadian Hot 100)	70
CIS Airplay (TopHit)	154
Denmark (Tracklisten)	51
France (SNEP)	98
Germany (Official German Charts)	67
Global 200 (Billboard)	127
Hungary (Single Top 40)	41
Hungary (Stream Top 40)	58
Iceland (Tónlistinn)	20
Ireland (IRMA)	17
Netherlands (Dutch Top 40)	42
Netherlands (Single Top 100)	28
New Zealand (Recorded Music NZ)	39
Norway (VG-lista)	32
Portugal (AFP)	84
Suriname (Nationale Top 40)	2
Sweden (Sverigetopplistan)	48
Switzerland (Schweizer Hitparade)	37
UK Singles (OCC)	12
US Adult Contemporary (Billboard)	21

2022 year-end chart performance for "Easy on Me"
Chart (2022)	Position
Australia (ARIA)	17
Austria (Ö3 Austria Top 40)	55
Belgium (Ultratop Flanders)	28
Belgium (Ultratop Wallonia)	50
Brazil Streaming (Pro-Música Brasil)	145
Canada (Canadian Hot 100)	11
Denmark (Tracklisten)	29
CIS Airplay (TopHit)	84
France (SNEP)	92
Germany (Official German Charts)	72
Global 200 (Billboard)	6
Iceland (Tónlistinn)	6
Lithuania (AGATA)	64
Netherlands (Dutch Top 40)	83
Netherlands (Single Top 100)	66
New Zealand (Recorded Music NZ)	14
Russia Airplay (TopHit)	146
Sweden (Sverigetopplistan)	33
Switzerland (Schweizer Hitparade)	34
UK Singles (OCC)	22
US Billboard Hot 100	4
US Adult Contemporary (Billboard)	1
US Adult Top 40 (Billboard)	10
US Mainstream Top 40 (Billboard)	11

2023 year-end chart performance for "Easy on Me"
Chart (2023)	Position
Global 200 (Billboard)	107

== Certifications ==
Certifications
Region	Certification	Certified units/sales
Australia (ARIA)	6× Platinum	420,000^{‡}
Austria (IFPI Austria)	Gold	15,000^{‡}
Belgium (BRMA)	Platinum	40,000^{‡}
Brazil (Pro-Música Brasil)	3× Diamond	480,000^{‡}
Canada (Music Canada)	7× Platinum	560,000^{‡}
Denmark (IFPI Danmark)	3× Platinum	270,000^{‡}
France (SNEP)	Diamond	333,333^{‡}
Germany (BVMI)	Platinum	400,000^{‡}
Italy (FIMI)	3× Platinum	300,000^{‡}
Mexico (AMPROFON)	4× Platinum	560,000^{‡}
New Zealand (RMNZ)	6× Platinum	180,000^{‡}
Poland (ZPAV)	3× Platinum	150,000^{‡}
Portugal (AFP)	4× Platinum	40,000^{‡}
Spain (Promusicae)	3× Platinum	180,000^{‡}
Switzerland (IFPI Switzerland)	3× Platinum	60,000^{‡}
United Kingdom (BPI)	4× Platinum	2,400,000^{‡}
United States (RIAA)	4× Platinum	4,000,000^{‡}
Streaming
Greece (IFPI Greece)	Platinum	2,000,000^{†}
Sweden (GLF)	2× Platinum	16,000,000^{†}
^{‡} Sales+streaming figures based on certification alone.^{†} Streaming-only figures based on certification alone.

== Release history ==
Release dates and formats
Region	Date	Format(s)	Version	Label(s)	Ref.
Various	15 October 2021	Digital download; streaming	Original	Columbia	
Italy	15 October 2021	Radio airplay	Original	Sony	
United States	18 October 2021	Adult contemporary radio	Original	Columbia	
United States	18 October 2021	Triple A radio	Original	Columbia	
United States	19 October 2021	Contemporary hit radio	Original	Columbia	
Germany	22 October 2021	CD	Original	Columbia; Sony	
Various	5 November 2021	Cassette	Original	Columbia	
United States	19 November 2021	Country radio	Duet with Chris Stapleton	In2une	

== See also ==
- List of Billboard Adult Contemporary number ones of 2021
- List of Billboard Adult Contemporary number ones of 2022
- List of Billboard Global 200 number ones of 2021
- List of Billboard Hot 100 number ones of 2021
- List of Billboard Hot 100 number ones of 2022
- List of UK Singles Chart number ones of the 2020s
- List of number-one songs of 2021 (Malaysia)
- List of number-one songs of 2021 (Singapore)
