= Marek Lieberberg =

German-Jewish concert promoter (born 1946)

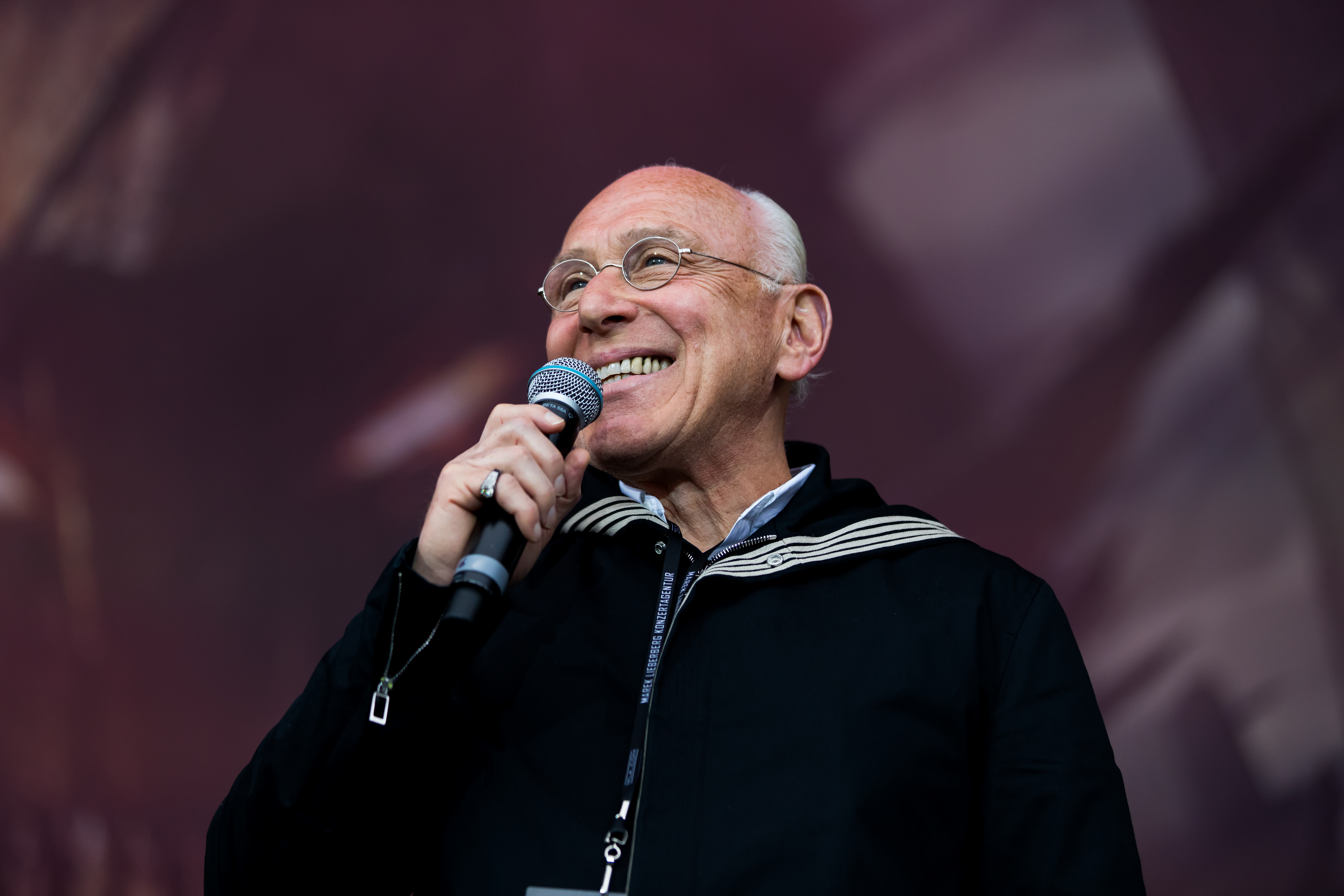
- Lieberberg in 2016
- Born: Marek Lieberberg; 7 May 1946 (age 80); Frankfurt am Main, Germany
- Occupations: Promoter; concert promoter; talent manager; journalist (early)
- Years active: 1969–present
- Known for: Founding of the Rock am Ring festival
- Notable work: Co-organiser of the 1971 and 1972 British Rock Meeting festival; Organiser of Pink Floyd 1981 The Wall Tour at the Westfalenhalle; Organiser of the 1992 Heute die! Morgen Du! festival; Organiser of the Rock am Ring and Rock im Park festivals; Organiser of the 2005 Live 8 concert, Berlin; First introduction of UFC and WWE events to Germany; Co-promoter of Adele in Munich
- Title: Chief executive officer of Live Nation GSA
- Children: 3

Marek Lieberberg (born 7 May 1946) is a German promoter, best known for founding the Rock am Ring music festival. He is Germany's largest and most influential concert promoter, having organised performances by international acts in that country throughout his career.

Lieberberg was born in Frankfurt am Main and grew up in the post-war city. After attending an English school, he went on to study at the University of Frankfurt. He then trained as a journalist and became a current affairs editor for the Associated Press in Germany. Choosing a different career path, Lieberberg began as a concert promoter in 1969 and co-founded the Mama Concerts agency in 1970. He co-organised the inaugural British Rock Meeting festival in 1971 and the subsequent 1972 edition. In 1985, Lieberberg founded the Rock am Ring festival and established it at the Nürburgring racetrack. The following year, he concluded his association with Mama Concerts.

Lieberberg founded his concert agency, Marek Lieberberg Konzertagentur (MLK), in 1987, which gradually became Germany's leading live music promoter. From the late 1980s onwards, he was Ute Lemper's talent manager. He promoted tours of domestic acts abroad and, in 1992, organised the music festival Heute die! Morgen Du! in response to right-wing extremist violence in Germany. In the 1990s, Lieberberg launched the Rock im Park music festival and sought to establish MLK in Hawaii, where he presented international artists to audiences. He organised the Live 8 concert in Berlin in 2005. Lieberberg first introduced WWE and UFC events in Germany in 2006 and 2009, respectively. He was responsible for the German music festivals Rock im Pott, Rock'n'Heim and Rock im Sektor.

In 2015, Live Nation Entertainment named Lieberberg chief executive officer of Live Nation in Germany, Switzerland, and Austria (GSA). His involvement in the Rock am Ring and Rock im Park festivals ceased in 2022, after he served as head of the organisers. In 2024, Lieberberg co-promoted Adele in Munich. He also produced and presented musical pieces and Cirque du Soleil shows for audiences in Germany, Austria, and Tel Aviv. A firm stand against racism and xenophobia marked his career; conversely, he consistently defended his protégés, Roger Waters and Xavier Naidoo, amidst discrimination allegations. Lieberberg was a member of various bands. In 2014, the European Festivals Awards gave him the Lifetime Achievement Award. In 2017, he received the Plaque of Honour from the City of Frankfurt.

== Early life ==
=== 1946–1968: Early years and journalism debut ===
Marek Lieberberg, whose parents were Polish Holocaust survivors, was born on 7 May 1946, in the Jewish Zeilsheim displaced persons (DP) camp. He resided in this United Nations camp in Zeilsheim, a suburb of Frankfurt am Main, housing refugees evacuated from liberated concentration camps or hidden areas. In his family, only his parents survived World War II. His two sisters had died of starvation during the war, and the Nazis had exterminated the rest of his family.

After obtaining the appropriate license from the American occupation authorities, his father produced chocolate and subsequently ran a coffee roastery. His mother, however, squandered away money earned by gambling. Lieberberg, who described his parents as "broken", grew up in post-war Frankfurt.

His parents' ethnic identity was intentionally indistinguishable in their lives; he was therefore enrolled in a boarding school in England to learn more about Jewish history. Lieberberg lived in London at the time of the Rolling Stones' founding. His early musical interests emerged at the age of 16, which led him to form a rock band. He has a brother named David.

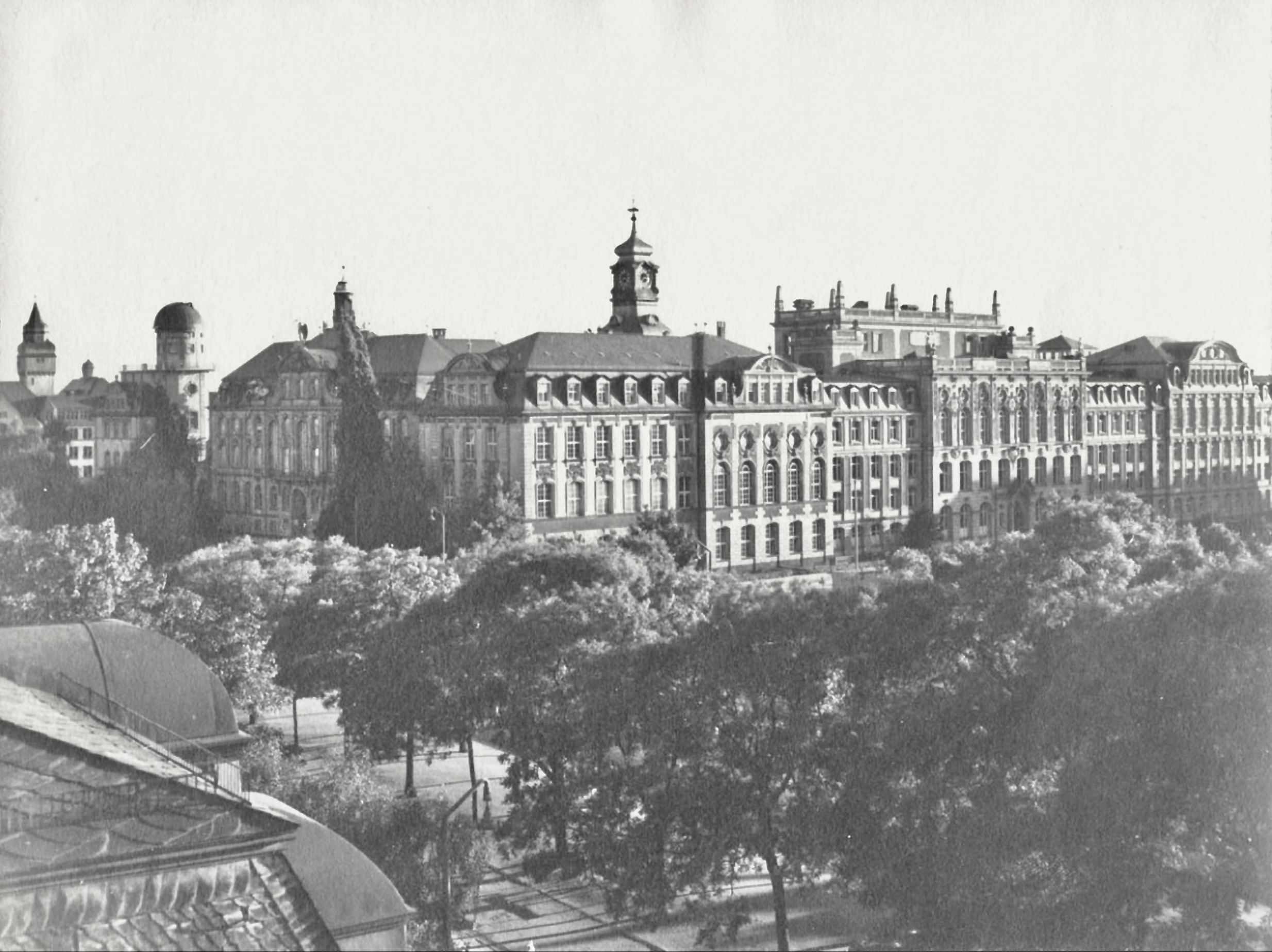
University of Frankfurt, where Lieberberg studied during the student revolt of 1968

Lieberberg studied sociology at the University of Frankfurt for a year, where he became involved in left-wing political circles, a characteristic trait of young Jews in the 1960s and 1970s. It was during the era of the Frankfurt School. The realm of music impressed him as much as literature and theatre, but he did not fully consider himself a "68er". He deemed this period politically "important" and also "stupid and dangerous", citing the Sozialistischer Deutscher Studentenbund (SDS), whose members rebuked those with differing opinions, conduct which displeased him greatly. Lieberberg disapproved of the way the SDS had suddenly castigated Theodor W. Adorno in Frankfurt. He said that the SDS's "most gifted orators" were Karl Dietrich Wolff and Hans-Jürgen Krahl, whom he referred to as "Jacobins" when they were at the University of Frankfurt. Lieberberg further said that Wolff and Krahl "made everyone's life hell" in a context where mass student protests against the state and the police seemed illusory to him. He was frightened by the "zeal" with which Wolff and Krahl forcefully confronted dissenters, even those who expressed scepticism. Lieberberg fled the SDS.

After two semesters of studying sociology, Lieberberg began a traineeship in news journalism at the Associated Press (AP). Lieberberg was AP's current affairs editor in Berlin and Bonn. Around 1968, he occasionally wrote about the music scene as a reporter.

== Concert promotion career ==
=== 1969–1970: Transition to live music event promotion ===
By the late 1960s, Lieberberg found himself without "one penny" in his pocket. An individual asked him for help promoting musicians such as Eric Clapton and Wilson Pickett, putting up posters for concerts in town, managing tickets and setting up the equipment. Lieberberg transitioned from journalist to concert promoter in the late 1960s, beginning by overseeing the organisation of several major outdoor shows in Germany. In 1969, he organised the "first open-air" event at Frankfurt's velodrome stadium, two years after the Summer of Love, Lieberberg said. Ellie Weinert of Billboard wrote that Lieberberg's experiences as a band member and journalist "proved to be major assets" when he shifted to a concert promoter.

=== 1970–1986: Mama Concerts ===
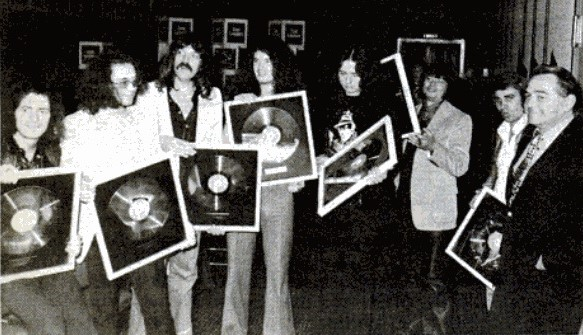
Mama Concerts was founded by Lieberberg and Marcel Avram (second from the right)

Lieberberg and his business partner Marcel Avram founded their concert agency Mama Concerts in 1970. The name of the company Mama Concerts was formed by combining the first syllable of Lieberberg's and Avram's first names. In 1970, at the age of 24, he was responsible for organising his first concert, that of the Who in Münster. One of his promoter duties was to drive his old Volkswagen (VW) car in front of the Who's bus to secure the band's arrival times in each city. In 1970, Lieberberg's responsibilities included organising Deep Purple's first German tour, as well as Pink Floyd's tour of that country.

Lieberberg and Avram then organised the first British Rock Meeting festival in September 1971 in Speyer, Germany. It was inspired by the model of the American festival and featured Black Sabbath, Fleetwood Mac and Rod Stewart.

Along with Deep Purple's manager, John Coletta, Lieberberg signed the contract for the band's 1972 German concerts on a paper tablecloth in an outdoor restaurant on Mendelssohnstraße in Frankfurt. In 1972, Lieberberg and Avram (Note: Marcel Avram began promoting Michael Jackson in 1972.) organised the second edition of the British Rock Meeting on an island near Germersheim, which attracted an audience of 100,000 people. It featured, among others, the Doors, Faces and Pink Floyd. Anja Perkuhn of Süddeutsche Zeitung called the 1972 British Rock Meeting "the mother of all German rock festivals". Lieberberg's work in the early 1970s was recognised for bringing international bands and leading rock acts to German stages.

Lieberberg's professional life would be a long and arduous undertaking, with its ups and downs. The first difficult hardship he encountered was that of Frank Sinatra in the mid-1970s, during his concert tour in West Germany organised by Mama Concerts. Sinatra began this 1975 tour in Munich and then Frankfurt, where he performed in half-empty halls. His next concert at the Deutschlandhalle in West Berlin was therefore cancelled. His German tour thus ended, with Lieberberg stating in 1975 that Sinatra nevertheless earned about 30,000 Deutsche Marks per concert. German newspapers had predicted the financial ruin of Lieberberg's company, but he denied this claim.

==== Inception of Rock am Ring ====
In 1980, Lieberberg attempted to organise a festival on the Schwalbenschwanz portion of the Nordschleife at the Nürburgring motorsports complex near Herresbach. However, the project ultimately failed due to protests from nearby residents and a lack of parking spaces.

In February 1981, Lieberberg organised Pink Floyd's series of concerts for The Wall Tour at the Westfalenhalle in Dortmund. Süddeutsche Zeitung's Joachim Hentschel said that he "wrote pop history with the band".

A large-scale open-air music festival in Germany had been dormant for about a decade. The few failed attempts at amateur festivals due to unfulfilled obligations or excesses have led the press and politicians to denigrate this type of event, Lieberberg arguing that the authorities and the church disseminated "propaganda". Years passed, and despite many efforts, no suitable location for an outdoor music festival had been found. Open-air festivals were not widely regarded favourably at the time.

The Rhineland-Palatinate Ministry of the Interior sought profitable uses for the state-owned Nürburgring property and had an idea for a music festival, which led Lieberberg to seize the opportunity. A committed CDU state secretary helped to overcome the difficulties encountered. In 1985, Lieberberg wanted to bring to the German region of the Palatinate (Pfalz) the atmosphere that reigned in the American town of Bethel during the first Woodstock music festival. He decided to launch a festival, and the 1972 British Rock Meeting would serve as a model. Lieberberg and his collaborators had learned lessons from Woodstock's "chaotic conditions" and the "serious errors" in Monterey [Festival], each of which, he said, was due to a precarious "foundation" and "structure" unsuited to large crowds. Rainer Mertel, the first managing director of the newly fashioned Nürburgring complex, placed his trust in him. Thus, Lieberberg founded the Rock am Ring music festival in 1985.

The inaugural edition of Rock am Ring drew a crowd of nearly 80,000 attendees and featured performances by Foreigner, Gianna Nannini, Joe Cocker, Marius Müller-Westernhagen and U2. Max Sprick of Neue Zürcher Zeitung wrote that songs like "Goldener Reiter", [Hubert Kah's] "Sternenhimmel" and "99 Luftballons" were not lasting hits in the mid-1980s, just as the "massively commercialised" Neue Deutsche Welle (NDW) genre was becoming overused and losing its importance. Sprick felt that for this reason, Lieberberg had favoured international "top acts" for his festival project.

For 16 years, Lieberberg headed the Frankfurt office of Mama Concerts. Following an argument, he and Avram ended their partnership in 1986.

=== 1987–2015: Marek Lieberberg Konzertagentur ===
In 1987, he founded his company, Marek Lieberberg Konzertagentur (MLK) (lit. 'Marek Lieberberg Concert Agency').

==== Business expansion ====
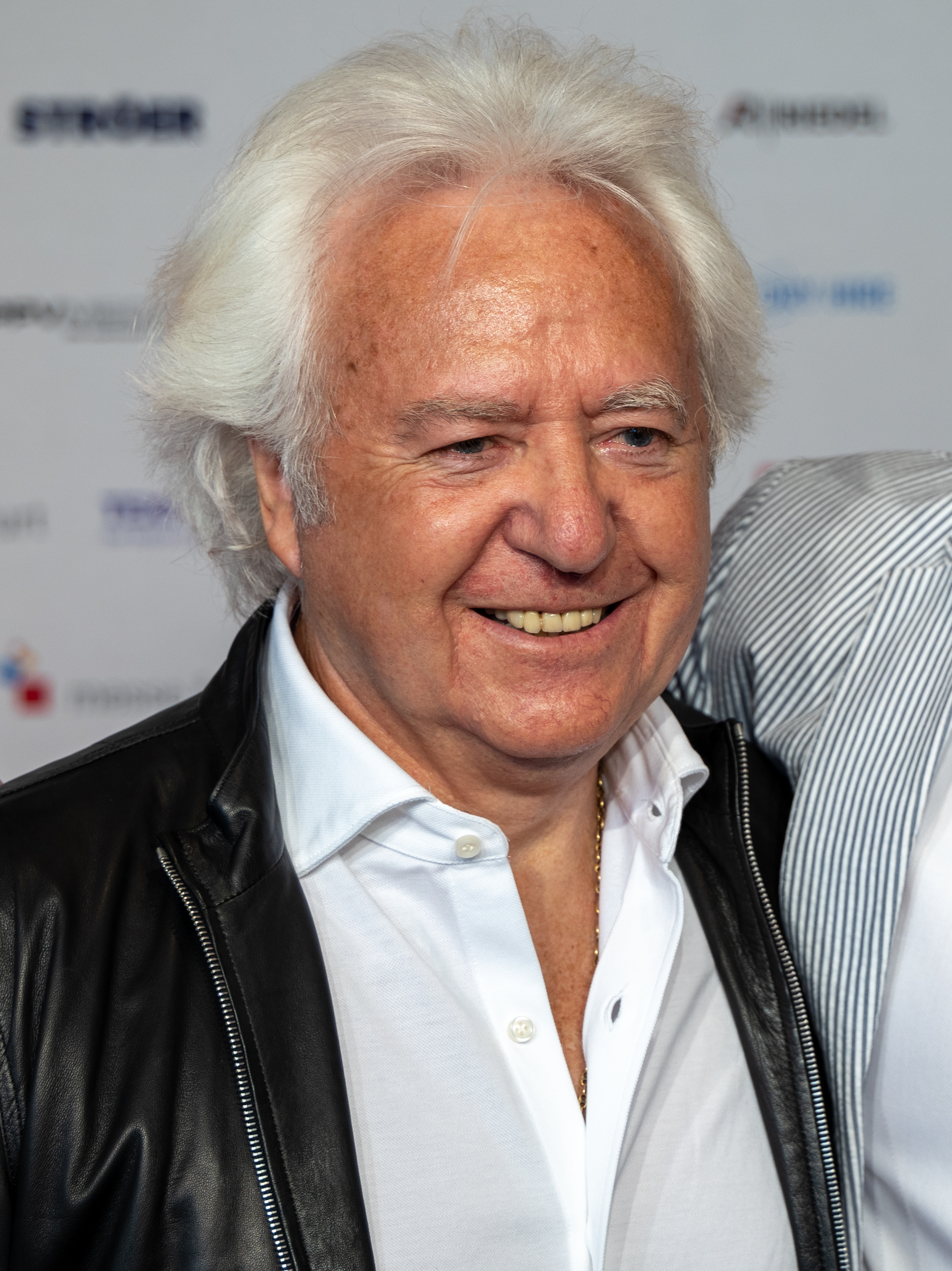
After parting ways with Avram, Lieberberg partnered with Ossy Hoppe (pictured)

Lieberberg formed a new business partnership with Ossy Hoppe, while Avram went to work with Fritz Rau. (Note: Following the dissolution of Marek Lieberberg and Avram's partnership, Mama Concerts merged with Fritz Rau's concert agency, Lippmann + Rau, to form Mama Concerts and Rau in 1989. Avram, head of Munich-based concert agency Mama Concerts and Rau, handled Jackson's world tours, Dangerous from 1992 to 1993 and HIStory from 1996 to 1997.) Lieberberg and Avram would reconcile later.

Lieberberg returned in 1991 with a revised concept for the Rock am Ring festival, (Note: In previous years, the Rock am Ring had to deal with the fear of terrorist attacks, and numerous left-wing extremist actions shook Germany, followed by downpours and storms; consequently, the festival did not take place in 1989 and 1990.) incorporating more stages, events, and featuring more rock music, with an emphasis on introducing newcomers to audiences. In 1991, Lieberberg was a founder member of an alliance, the European Concert Promoters Association.

In 1992, Lieberberg presented two local acts on tours of Germany, Austria, and Switzerland: Uwe Ochsenknecht's sold-out tour, encompassing eleven small venues, drawing a crowd of more than 6,000; and tenor Peter Hofmann, who performed pop and Elvis Presley's songs from his Love Me Tender during a 25-city tour. MLK presented music regardless of its geographical origin, the main difference being greater communication with a domestic act, which enabled a focus on production. Lieberberg specified tours they handled: Falco in Europe and Japan, as well as Nena in Holland, Scandinavia, the UK, and Japan. He cited Tori Amos and Mark Cohen as examples of emerging artists whom he placed great emphasis on stage personality and musical originality, noting that US acts depended more on their own videos and MTV to present themselves than European ones.

Lieberberg, opposed to the Hoyerswerda and Rostock-Lichtenhagen riots and the violence in Mölln, organised Heute die! Morgen Du! in December 1992 at the Frankfurt Messehalle. Kate Brady of Deutsche Welle called the Rostock attacks "the worst right-wing violence in Germany since the Second World War". As a charity festival, Heute die! Morgen Du! was organised to protest against Germany's right-wing extremist violence. The 1992 impromptu event featured some of the country's best-known musicians, with 16 channels broadcasting the event. Heute die! Morgen Du! drew a crowd of 150,000, with Müller-Westernhagen among the musicians who performed.

The Rock in Vienna music festival, a parallel event to Rock am Ring, was launched in 1993. Lieberberg observed a contrast between the experience of working in a concert hall, similar to that of the Who, and in a festival setting, as in 1993 when he went on stage at Rock am Ring and had to personally ask the "booing" audience to be quiet during Leonard Cohen's performance. After serving on the European Concert Promoters Association's board for two years, he felt that the 50-promoter organisation was not large enough and therefore hoped that it would expand in the future to play a decisive role in European policy.

The Rock in Riem music festival was established in 1994 as a "spin-off" of Rock am Ring, taking place on the tarmac of Flughafen München Riem in Munich, featuring 22 bands, with Aerosmith and Peter Gabriel as headliners and some heavy music acts.

In 1995, he stated that they were active throughout Europe, and had already presented Aerosmith, Guns N' Roses, Metallica and Sting in Israel. Other concerts Lieberberg had handled since then included those of Annie Lennox, Bee Gees, Billy Joel, Bob Geldof, Bon Jovi, Bryan Ferry, Bruce Springsteen, Cat Stevens, Chris Rea, Depeche Mode, Dire Straits, Elton John, Pink Floyd, R.E.M., Simply Red, Sting, U2, and ZZ Top. In the same year, Rock in Riem was renamed Rock im Park. It was relocated to the Olympiastadion in Munich, the same place where Avram had set up his own festival, and he and Lieberberg competed for fans. He identified the need for a reform of the Rock am Ring festival in the mid-1990s.

==== Operations in Hawaii ====
In the late 1990s, Lieberberg wanted to expand his promotion business in Hawaii, saying, "I am looking at being the No. 1 promoter in this market". Tim Ryan of Honolulu Star-Bulletin said Lieberberg was "feeling pretty voracious" about the prospect of future concerts in Hawaii. In 1997, he was responsible for Bush's concerts in Oahu and Maui. Lieberberg conducted his European business operations from Hawaii at the time. That year, the Rock im Park festival was transferred to Nuremberg to coincide with Rock am Ring.

In February 1998, Lieberberg brought Céline Dion to the Blaisdell Arena in Hawaii for two sold-out performances. In late 1998, Hoppe, who had been MLK's deputy managing director for eight years, and Lieberberg parted ways by mutual agreement but continued to collaborate on projects involving various artists. Annelu Keggenhoff succeeded Hoppe in this position at the agency.

Lieberberg reported the occurrence of 450 events during 1999, which had generated attendances exceeding 2 million people, with a financial report indicating a revenue of 120 million Deutsche Marks (equivalent to US$60 million in 2000) for that year.

==== Career progression ====
Lieberberg was the ticketing partner working in collaboration with CTS Eventim. As part of a strategy to establish its website as a premier European event portal, CTS Eventim took a 51% stake in MLK, effective 1 July 2000. Lieberberg told Norbert Obkircher of MusikWoche that CTS Eventim had submitted "the best offer" to him, allowing them to improve and expand the quality of their activities at the "European level". Lieberberg's 1991 concept for Rock am Ring proved effective, enabling the festival to grow; the 2000 edition attracted more than double the number of spectators as the 1988 edition.

Lieberberg, who had known Madonna since the early 1980s, was her concert manager in Germany during her 2001 Drowned World Tour. MTV Europe (MTVE) collaborated with MLK to showcase numerous local musicians performing live around Frankfurt during the 2001 MTV Europe Music Awards, which took place in the city.

On 7 December 2004, the regional court of Nuremberg-Fürth ordered MLK to pay €4,000 (equivalent to $5,300 in 2004) in compensation to a 38-year-old woman who said she suffered from tinnitus after standing about 3 to 5 metres from a loudspeaker during a Bon Jovi concert in September 2000. The court validated the plaintiff's assertion that the concert organiser failed to implement adequate precautions to ensure that the sound volume remained at a safe level. Lieberberg stated that the "decision was 'very dubious'" and "a perfect scenario" that could be exploited by anyone claiming harm and seeking compensation for "pain and suffering" through lawsuits.

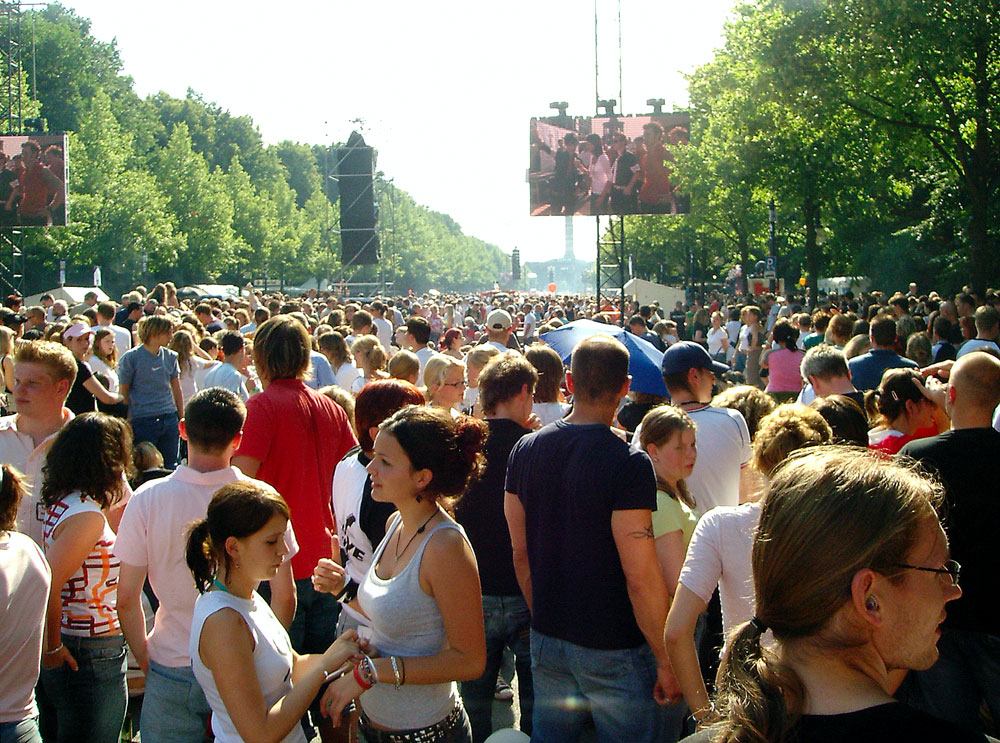
Crowd of spectators attending the Live 8 concert, Berlin, 2005, organised by Lieberberg

Lieberberg was the organiser of the Live 8 concert in Berlin, which took place in July 2005. It was part of Live 8, a series of benefit concerts held in multiple cities worldwide aimed at raising awareness of poverty in Africa. He organised Berlin's Live 8 concert for his longtime friend Geldof. The lack of support from politicians and business sponsors had dismayed Lieberberg a month earlier, and he viewed it as a failure that would have a financial impact on the bands performing at the concert, who would have to pay for the £663,000 show themselves. More than 100,000 attendees participated in the event held on Berlin's central avenue, featuring performances by A-ha, Audioslave, Chris de Burgh, Green Day, Roxy Music and Wir sind Helden.

Bryan Adams, Michael Bublé, Dion, Sting, Depeche Mode, as well as R.E.M.'s Michael Stipe and Mike Mills, were among Lieberberg's clients who showed their appreciation on the occasion of his sixtieth birthday on 7 May 2006. In 2006, MLK ranked seventh worldwide after selling more than a million tickets in the first half of that year. On revenues of €100 million, a profit of €7 million was achieved. Lieberberg organised Madonna's performances in Düsseldorf and Hanover in August 2006 as part of her Confessions Tour. In September 2006, Thomas Schulz of Der Spiegel wrote that a Madonna concert earned Lieberberg $50,000. In 2006, Lieberberg and Live Nation jointly organised the German dates of Christina Aguilera's Back to Basics Tour.

In April 2007, he presented four concerts in Germany of The Dark Side of the Moon Live by Pink Floyd's Roger Waters. He handled the concerts of the Cranberries' Dolores O'Riordan in June 2007 at Berlin's Columbia Club and Cologne's Gloria, as part of her European tour in support of her debut solo album, Are You Listening? Lieberberg, based in Frankfurt, won Tour Promoter of the Year 2007 at Germany's annual Live Entertainment Award (LEA), held at the Colour Line Arena in Hamburg. Some musicians whose concerts he promoted that year included Springsteen, Nelly Furtado, the Police and Shakira. He refused the award because his Rock am Ring had not won Best Festival.

In 2008, Madonna's Sticky & Sweet Tour took place in Berlin, Düsseldorf and Frankfurt, with concerts organised via MLK.

In 2009, Lieberberg was awarded two Live Entertainment Awards in Hamburg: Concert Promoter of the Year and Festival of the Year for his two open-air festivals, Rock am Ring and Rock im Park. In 2009, he had been the promoter for all Joel's German tours since the late 1970s. MLK promoted Depeche Mode's German concerts for the 2009 Tour of the Universe. Lieberberg took legal action against the secondary ticket market, specifically the Internet ticket portal Ventic, for offering inflated ticket prices for this Depeche Mode tour. The Dutch company Smartfox Media, which operated Ventic's German service, acquired tickets through both the MLK distribution system and third parties. The Munich District Court then prohibited Ventic from trading indirectly purchased concert tickets for a specific leg of the German tour, from 2 to 13 June 2009. While Lieberberg was confident he had won the legal battle, the interim injunction was cancelled "in some key points and limited to very specific tickets", said Martin Josten, chief executive officer (CEO) of Smartfox Media, adding, "although these no longer play a role in practise".

==== Further developments ====
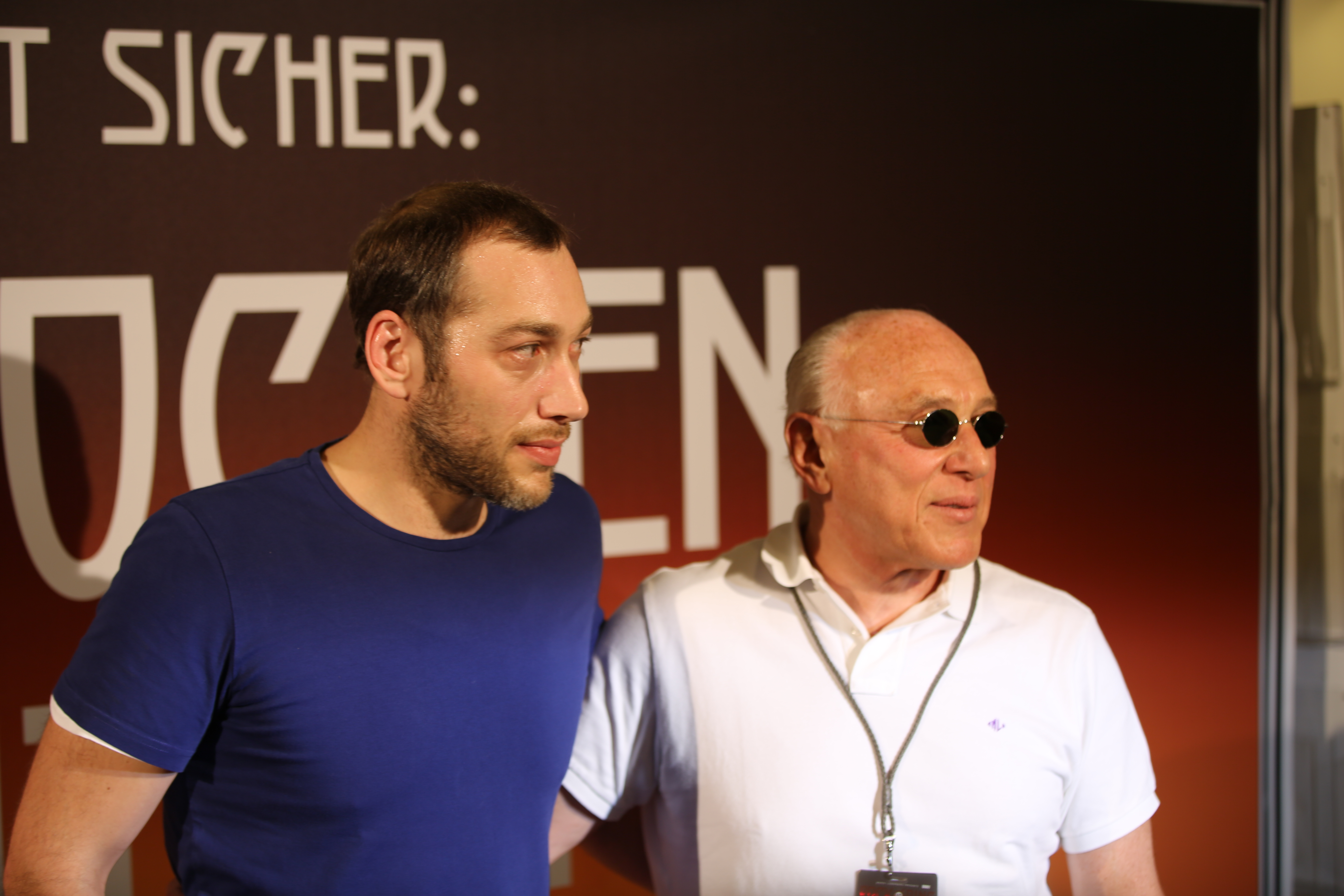
Lieberberg, organiser of Rock am Ring, with his son André in charge of the festival's programming

In 2010, he won the Live Entertainment Award as Tour Promoter of the Year. The previous year, he presented Coldplay, Green Day, Linkin Park, U2, and Xavier Naidoo through his company, MLK. In June 2010, Peter Badenhop of Frankfurter Allgemeine Zeitung described Lieberberg as "the most successful concert promoter in Europe". In 2010, the Rock am Ring festival was "practically still a family business", managing a budget in the millions and employing about 500 people at peak times. The last 25 years saw Rock am Ring host 1,300 bands. Lieberberg led the organisation of Rock am Ring, and his son André, who had the primary responsibility within the festival, was in charge of the programming. Both continued to make decisions within MLK, even though CTS Eventim held the majority stake in the company. After deliberation, Lieberberg deemed Die Toten Hosen, Metallica, Rage Against the Machine, the Prodigy and U2 to be the festival's "greatest successes". Lieberberg sold 2.7 million concert tickets in 2010, ranking MLK third worldwide, while he simultaneously handled the Rock am Ring and Rock im Park festivals. Commenting on the death toll of 21 due to mass overcrowding at the Love Parade disaster in Duisburg in July 2010, Liberberg attributed it to "completely overstretched authorities" in conjunction with "incompetent organisers". He estimated that a total of 1,000 security personnel were present when 4,000 to 5,000 would have been required.

Lieberberg's company and Wizard Promotions teamed up to bring the "Big Four" of thrash metal, comprising Metallica, Megadeth, Slayer and Anthrax, for a joint concert on 2 July 2011, with the bands performing to a crowd of 57,000 at the sold-out Veltins Arena in Gelsenkirchen.

MLK had a history of partnering with Live Nation in Europe on global tours for Madonna, Rihanna, Justin Timberlake and U2. In 2012, Lieberberg and Live Nation collaborated on two Madonna's [MDNA Tour] appearances in Berlin and another in Cologne. Deviating from his established rock music routine, he was involved in the electronic music festival SonneMondSterne for two years. Lieberberg founded Rock im Pott, a one-day music festival that premiered on 25 August 2012 at the Veltins Arena in Gelsenkirchen. Planned to be an annual event taking place in Gelsenkirchen, the first Rock im Pott featured Red Hot Chili Peppers, Placebo, the BossHoss, Jan Delay, and Kraftklub and was produced by Lieberberg with Dirk Becker. Lieberberg, along with Jacky Jedlicki, who worked for MLK, personally committed to having the 2012 MTV Europe Music Awards held in Frankfurt, which came to fruition in March of that year, with the city beating out all other candidates.

In 2013, Lieberberg won two Live Entertainment Awards for Concert of the Year while promoting Coldplay at the Red Bull Arena in Leipzig and Festival of the Year for his Rock im Pott in Gelsenkirchen. Lieberberg's 2013 Rock im Pott festival featured Biffy Clyro, Casper, Deftones, System Of A Down, Tenacious D, and Volbeat. He launched the annual Rock'n'Heim music festival in cooperation with Live Nation, which premiered in August 2013 at the Hockenheimring, featuring Nine Inch Nails and System of a Down. In 2013, he handled Waters' The Wall concerts on 4 September at the Olympic Stadium in Berlin and on 6 September at the Esprit Arena in Düsseldorf.

In 2014, the European Festivals Awards gave him a Lifetime Achievement Award. Automotive supplier Capricorn, the new owner of the Nürburgring racetrack, initially demanded a larger share of the Rock am Ring's profits, amounting to approximately 42%, which Lieberberg deemed unfeasible. As a result, Capricorn terminated Lieberberg's contract and entered into a partnership with Peter Schwenkow, CEO of Deutsche Entertainment AG (DEAG). With musicians and fans pledging their loyalty, Lieberberg staged what was then the final Rock am Ring at the Nürburgring in June 2014. He therefore considered moving the festival while retaining its name, which was considered "a kind of trademark". The case was brought before the Koblenz court, as Lieberberg and the venue's new owners failed to reach an agreement on continuing the partnership. While the venue operators had petitioned for a temporary injunction, the court ruled that Lieberberg "does not possess sole rights to the name 'Rock am Ring'" which could not be used to advertise or name an event without approval from Nürburgring GmbH. The city of Mönchengladbach was in talks with Lieberberg in 2014, as he planned to relocate his Rock am Ring to the former NATO headquarters at Rheindahlen. Rock am Ring would be replaced by another music festival at the Nürburgring racetrack from 2015, the Grüne Hölle – Rockfestival am Nürburgring, organised by Schwenkow. The 2014 edition of the Rock'n'Heim festival attracted 35,000 people.

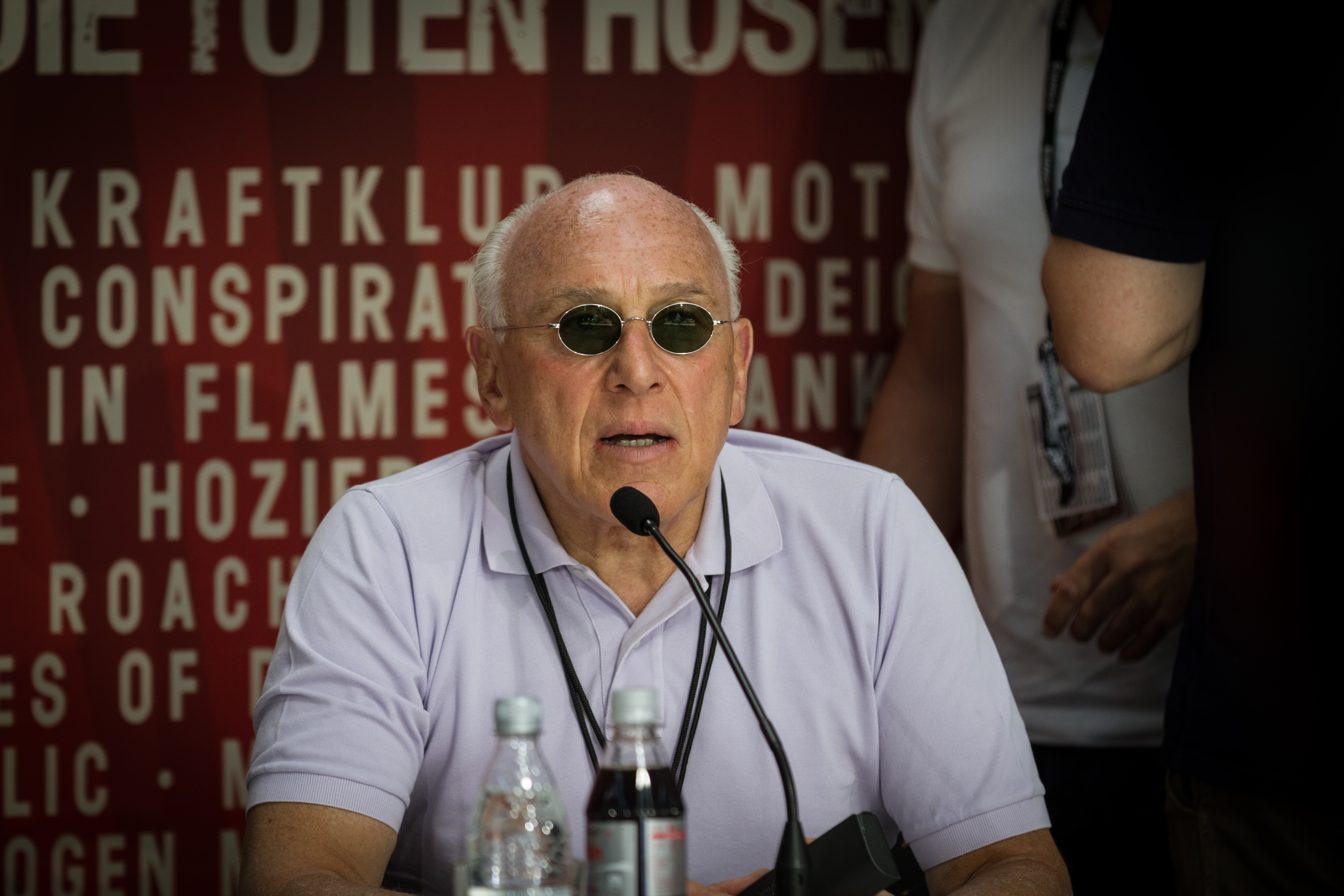
Lieberberg at the Rock am Ring press conference in June 2015. For the first time in its history, the annual music festival did not take place at the Nürburgring

Eventually, Lieberberg won his case before the judges of the Koblenz Oberlandesgericht, who allowed him to protect the name "Rock am Ring". He relocated the Rock am Ring festival to a former army airfield in Mendig and secured a five-year lease. Fans "punished the 'Grüne Hölle' with disregard", which sold only 15,000 tickets, and followed Lieberberg to Mendig to attend his Rock am Ring, which sold out at the beginning of April 2015. At the Live Entertainment Award, he won Festival of the Year 2014 for his Rock am Ring and Rock im Park, the ceremony of which took place in the Festhalle Frankfurt in April 2015. Lieberberg collaborated with Live Nation and Creative Artists Agency (CAA) to bring Ariana Grande's The Honeymoon Tour to Berlin and Cologne in May and June 2015, as part of her first German tour.

Elsa Keslassy of Variety described MLK as Germany's "leading concert promoter". Musicians whom Lieberberg brought to Germany over the years and promoted through MLK, who were able to establish their international careers in the country, included Bob Dylan, Dion, Coldplay, Depeche Mode, Joel, Linkin Park, Mark Knopfler, Madonna, Metallica, Queen, R.E.M., Santana, Springsteen, and Sting. He was responsible for the concerts of Lady Gaga. He also promoted national acts such as Herbert Grönemeyer, Müller-Westernhagen, Scorpions, and Helene Fischer.

=== 2015–present: Live Nation GSA ===
In 2015, Lieberberg had extensive experience in concert promotion, totalling more than 45 years. In August 2015, Live Nation Entertainment announced the establishment of Live Nation Concerts Germany to promote concerts and festivals in Germany, as well as in Switzerland and Austria. Lieberberg was appointed CEO of Live Nation Concerts Germany, effective 1 January 2016. The deal with Lieberberg expanded Live Nation's reach by over 2 million fans and added more than 700 live events to its platform. It was the conclusion of a series of unsuccessful attempts by Live Nation "to gain a foothold in the German market". Lieberberg left his own company, MLK, in August 2015, after 15 years of collaboration with CTS Eventim. MLK was still part of CTS Eventim, which continued to organise the Rock am Ring and Rock im Park festivals. With his son André, he began working for the Live Nation German arm. Overall, Lieberberg is the CEO of Live Nation Germany, Switzerland, and Austria (Live Nation GSA).

While the Rock im Pott festival was on hiatus, Lieberberg organised Rock im Sektor, the "little brother" of Rock'n'Heim, via MLK. He invited Linkin Park as headliner for the first Rock im Sektor festival, as well as various bands such as Kraftklub, and they performed for 25,500 people in September 2015 at the Esprit Arena in Düsseldorf. In November 2015, Lieberberg was the promoter of Madonna's Rebel Heart Tour in Germany, at Cologne's Lanxess Arena and Berlin's Mercedes-Benz Arena.

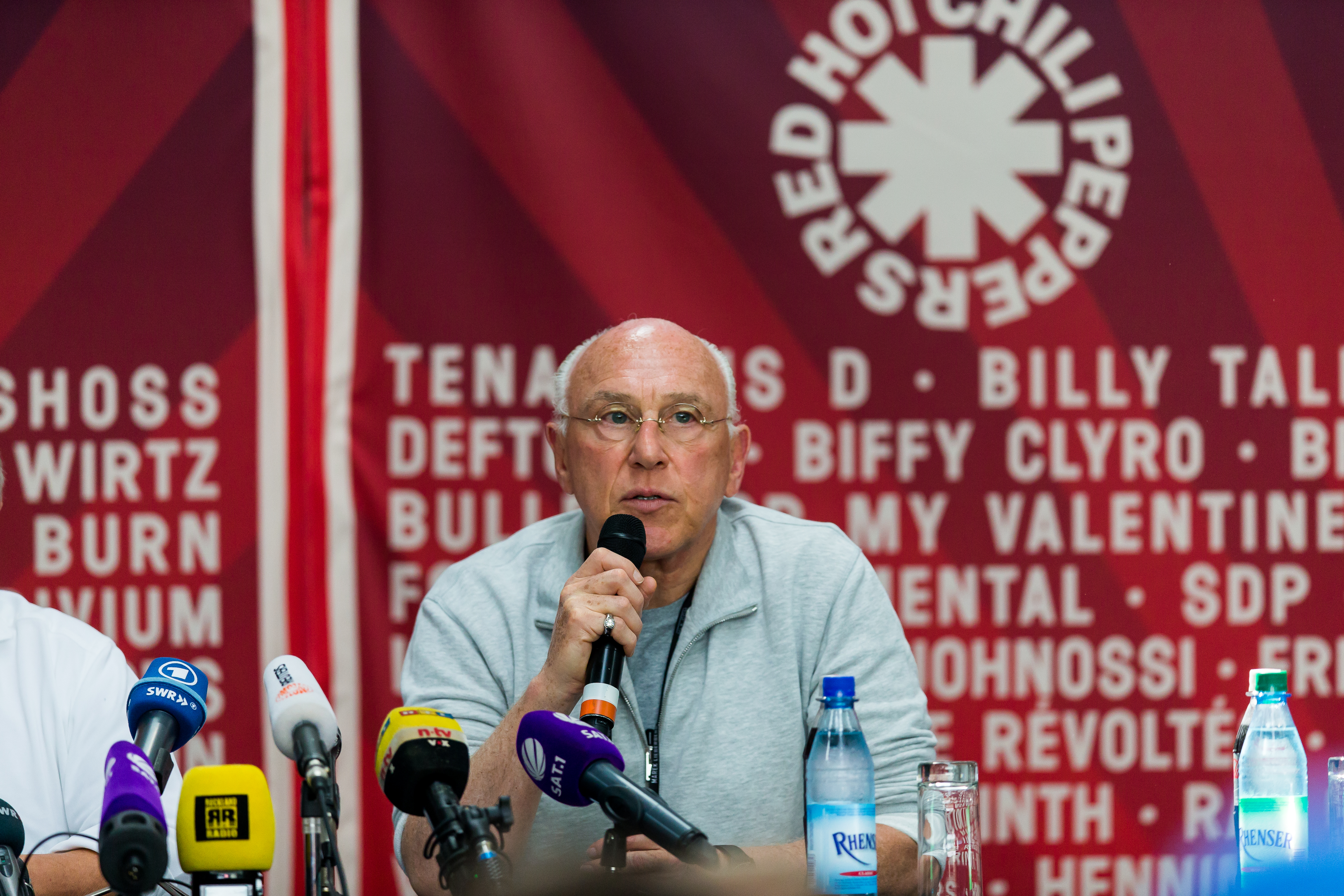
Lieberberg at the Rock am Ring 2016 press conference

He remained the head of the organisers of the Rock am Ring and Rock im Park festivals in 2016. At this edition, concerts were interrupted for about an hour and a half, as lightning injured 71 people, and 42 others were hospitalised, eight of them seriously. Lieberberg undertook measures to manage the situation as 90,000 people were present on site. The same scenario had occurred the previous year, with 33 injured.

In June 2017, Willi Winkler of Süddeutsche Zeitung wrote that throughout his career, Lieberberg organised "the better part of this republic's soundtrack – and that is his rebellion". An unexpected turn of events occurred when the Rock am Ring returned to its founding location, the Nürburgring, after being held at Mendig Air Base for two years. Lieberberg said it would have been necessary to invest millions more to comply with environmental protection requirements for fauna, flora, and water at the Mendig location, in addition to the uncertainty surrounding the festival's long-term approval. He criticised the police's decision to evacuate the nearly 90,000 people attending the 2017 Rock am Ring festival, which had been temporarily shut down due to a potential terror threat. The police were already present at the festival, having significantly augmented security following the terror attack in Manchester, deploying more than 1,200 officers in the field. On 23 June 2017, Lieberberg received the Plaque of Honour of the City of Frankfurt, which was awarded to him by Mayor Peter Feldmann. The ceremony took place in the Kaisersaal of Frankfurt's Römer in the presence of Lieberberg and his wife. Feldmann said this distinction was given for his "commitment to rock and pop music", noting that he advocated philanthropy and took a stand against xenophobia and racism.

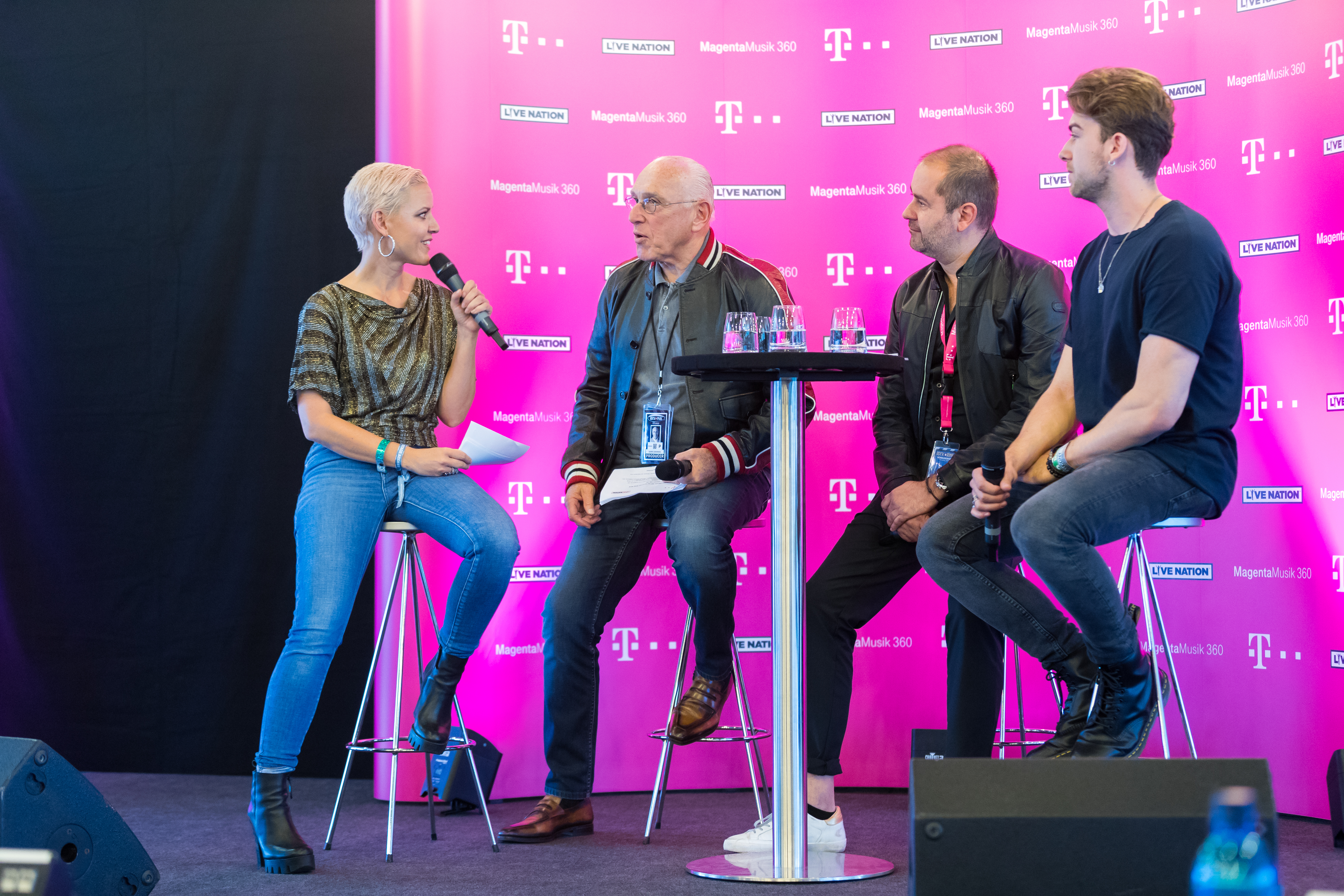
Lieberberg interviewed during the Rock am Ring 2018

In November 2018, Lieberberg was nominated for the Live Entertainment Award for Beyoncé's Formation World Tour and Coldplay's A Head Full of Dreams Tour, with the ceremony taking place in April of the following year at the Festhalle Frankfurt. MLK was nominated for Concert of the Year for Adele at the Barclaycard Arena in Hamburg [in 2016].

German event organisers tested the resumption of small-scale concerts during the coronavirus pandemic while adhering to strict measures. However, Lieberberg created agitation with Live Nation Germany, which announced the first major two-and-a-half-hour concert in Germany scheduled for 4 September 2020, at Düsseldorf's Merkur Arena, limited to 23% capacity, with performances by Adams, Sarah Connor and Rea Garvey. Lieberberg's Give Live a Chance event sought to demonstrate the feasibility of large-scale concerts during a pandemic by offering "hope" to the music industry and setting a "positive example".

During the pandemic, CTS Eventim founded its subsidiary, Dreamhaus, headed by Matt Schwarz, and subsequently took total control of the Rock am Ring festival.

==== After departing the twin festivals ====
2022 marked the end of Lieberberg's involvement in the Rock am Ring and Rock im Park festivals; yet his name remains inextricably linked to the events. He was the "face of the festival" for more than three decades, conducting press conferences and taking to the stage to announce the leading acts, and was also known for appearing in unexpected situations.

At the three-day Rolling Loud 2023 hip-hop festival in Munich, which took place for the first time in Germany, Lieberberg found that criticism was "partly really overdrawn" regarding the direction the event was taking due to aggressive individuals. Moreover, he did not understand the discussion regarding the suitability of the outdoor area at Messe München (Munich Messe) for large-scale concerts. Rolling Loud Germany 2023, organised by Live Nation Germany and Leutgeb Entertainment Group, featured Kendrick Lamar, Travis Scott, Wizkid and other rappers. According to the police, the festival's "overall vibe" appeared "remarkably aggressive" with individuals strewing stones at security staff, resulting in 800 incidents, including 27 hospitalisations. Lieberberg attributed the problems encountered to a minority of individuals, out of the 60,000 people present, but noted that they could develop the security concept further for the next edition. Live Nation GSA staged 50 open-air events throughout the 2023 festival season at major stadiums in Germany, Switzerland and Austria, which attracted more than three million people.

In 2024, Lieberberg co-promoted Adele's concert residency, Adele in Munich, through Live Nation Germany. He said Adele in Munich was "the most extensive project in my [more than] 50 years in the music business". In April 2024, he was included in Billboard's International Power Players list in the Live category for "executives who are driving success outside the United States" and have "contributed to a ninth consecutive year of growth for the global recorded-music business". He and André oversee Goodlive, a Live Nation-owned company that presents ten festivals in Germany, Switzerland, and Austria.

In December 2024, Frankfurter Allgemeine Zeitung's Daniel Meuren described Lieberberg as "The largest and most influential concert promoter in Germany". As talks began for a project to construct a new multifunctional arena for Frankfurt, Lieberberg proposed building an extension to the Festhalle located on the city's exhibition grounds, or even increasing its capacity by making interior changes, such as demolishing the balconies and replacing them with steep stands, while preserving the site's character, which is under monument protection.

After Naidoo's four-year absence following his controversial remarks and conduct, Lieberberg organised, via Live Nation [Germany], his "big comeback concert", on 16 December 2025, at the Lanxess Arena in Cologne. Ralf Niemczyk of Rolling Stone Germany wrote that Lieberberg "has never let his protégé drop".

== Career in other event sectors ==
=== 1980s and 1990s ===
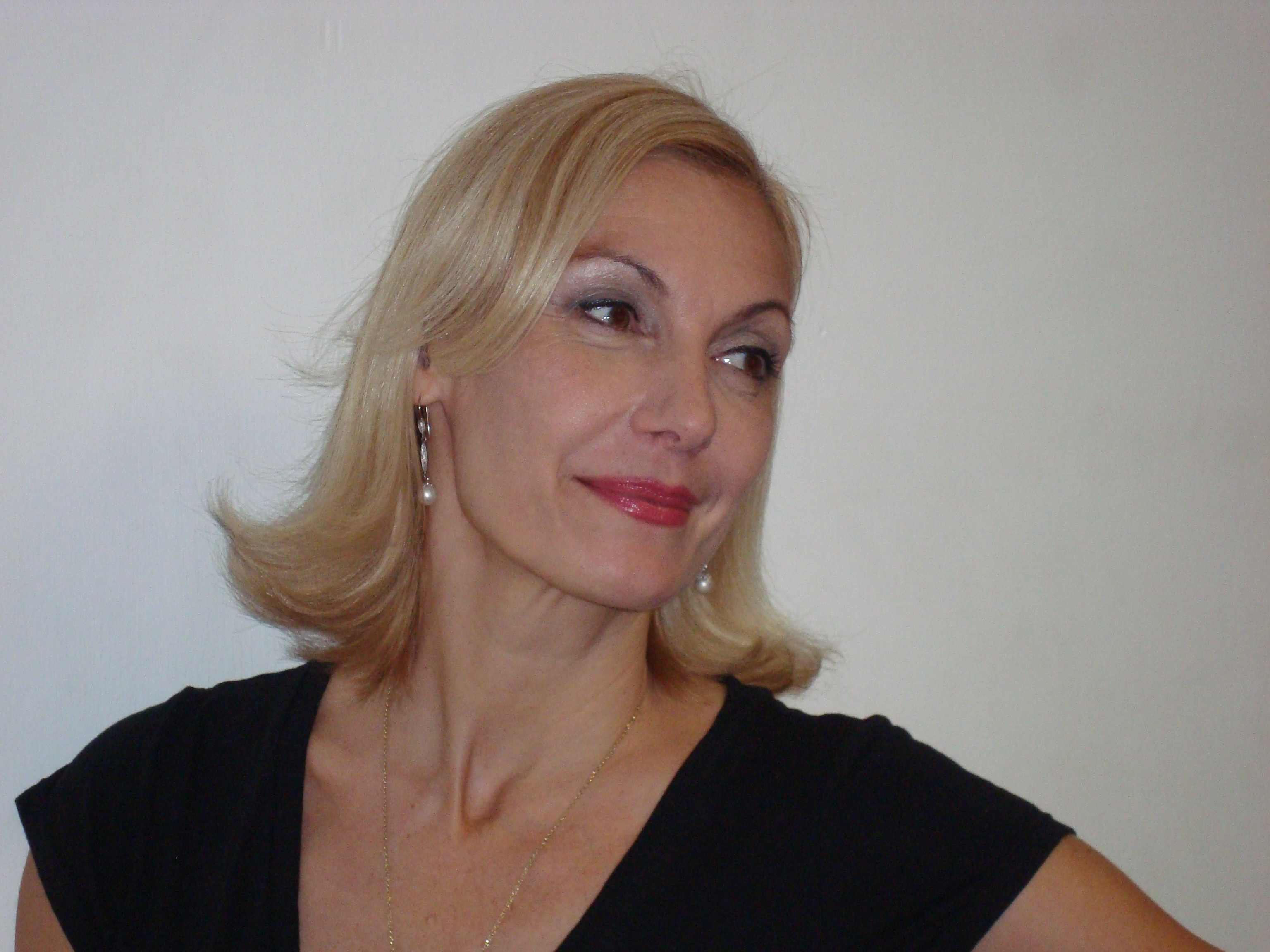
Lieberberg intensively promoted Ute Lemper when he was her manager

Lieberberg was the talent manager of German singer and actress Ute Lemper from the second half of the 1980s until the early 1990s. Lemper achieved success in the 1980s, initially with her role in the musical Cats in Vienna. She became more successful in 1987 with her starring role as Sally Bowles in the Parisian musical Cabaret, when Lieberberg had taken her under his wing. He aimed to establish Lemper as a leading entertainer in Germany, promoting her in mainstream media and enabling her to make headline news. Lieberberg achieved this ambition, resulting in financial benefits for him, while development progressed "faster and faster", leaving Lemper struggling with an uncontrollable pace. Lemper's solo show sold out Munich's Olympiahalle three times in a row and Dortmund's Westfalenhalle four times, and attracted a total of around 200,000 people in one year. MLK actively promoted her appearances on every Saturday evening television shows such as Wetten, dass..? and others hosted by Kulenkampff and Rudi Carrell, which were watched a "millionfold" at the time. Lemper received a poor critical reception in 1992 for her reprise of the role of Lola in The Blue Angel at the Theatre des Westens in Berlin, which damaged her career. For Lemper, Lieberberg contributed to her failure, pointing to over-presence and saturation. He blamed her as well, and they went their separate ways.

In 1999, MLK organised a performance of magician David Copperfield's show You! at the Musical Dome in Cologne.

=== 2000s ===
The Berlin production of the musical Les Misérables premiered on 26 September 2003, at the Theatre des Westens. Lieberberg originally secured the rights to the play and asked Heinz Rudolf Kunze to translate it into German in 1987 for a Vienna production. Lieberberg, in cooperation with Semmel Concerts, brought professional wrestlers from the American wrestling federation WWE to Germany. Wrestlers such as Kurt Angle, Batista, Mark Henry, Melina [Perez], Rey Mysterio, Randy Orton, and Booker T met on 11 November 2006, at the Nuremberg Arena during the SmackDown Survivor Series Tour. It was Germany's inaugural WWE event. He was the co-producer of an Israeli event, a Judy Craymer musical production based on the songs of the Swedish pop band ABBA, titled Mamma Mia!, taking place in June 2007 for a series of performances at the Nokia Basketball Arena in Tel Aviv.

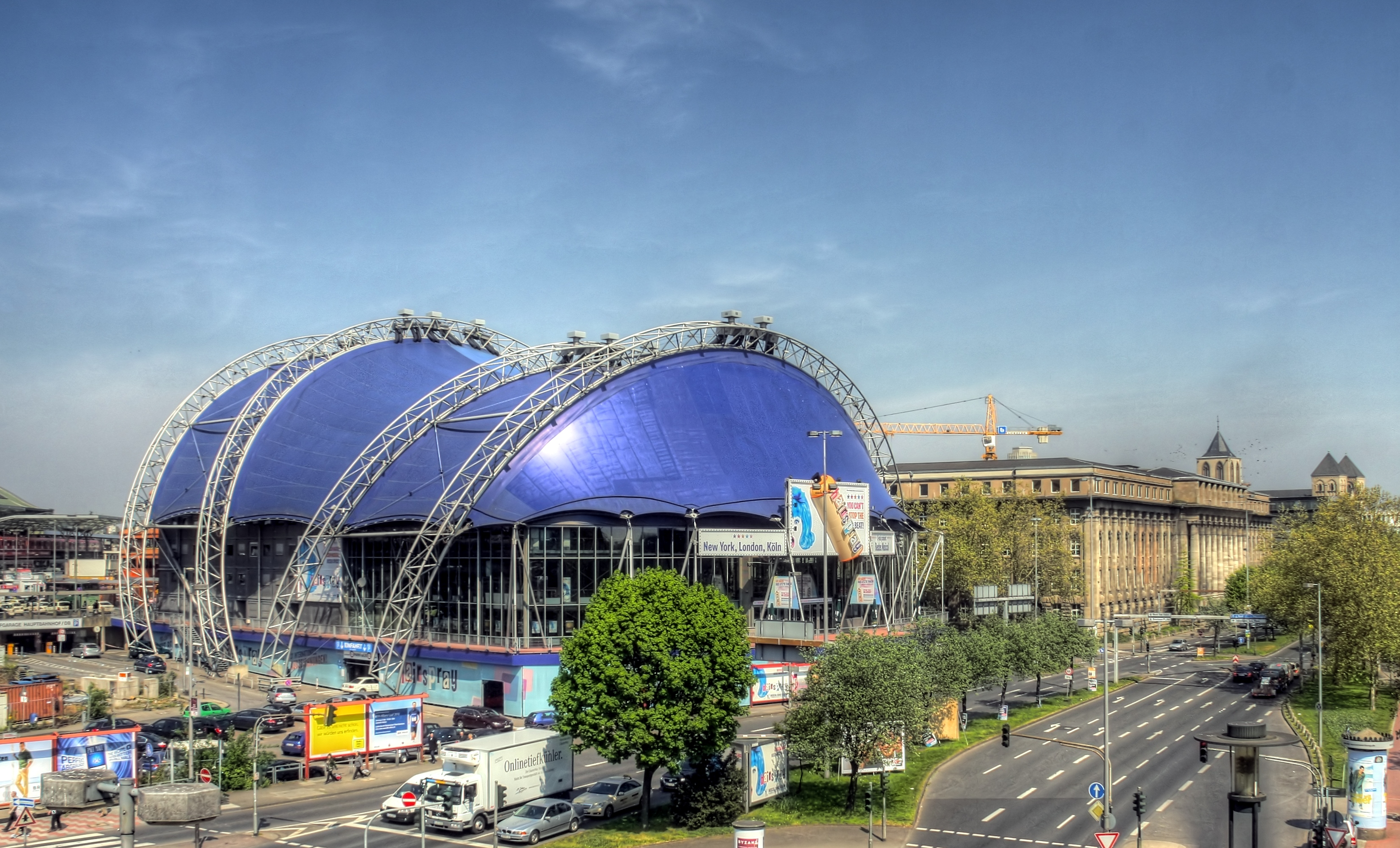
Hairspray billboard at the Musical Dome in Cologne, 2010

In 2008, the Theatre St. Gallen in Switzerland presented an independent adaptation of the Broadway musical Hairspray, making its German-language premiere. The German-speaking rights, held by Lieberberg and Michael Brenner, were acquired by St. Gallen. Lieberberg discovered the UFC on American television and met the Fertitta brothers during a fight in Las Vegas, before embarking on the adventure. He thereafter brought mixed martial arts (MMA) professionals to Cologne to fight in June 2009 at the Lanxess Arena, which was the first-ever UFC event organised in Germany, titled UFC 99: The Comeback. Lieberberg and Brenner launched their co-production, the German version of Hairspray, at the Musical Dome in Cologne from December 2009, for daily performances starring Ochsenknecht and Maite Kelly. American Jack O'Brien supervised the German version of the show, which had required an investment of 7 million euros by Lieberberg and Brenner.

=== 2010s ===
Through MLK and in collaboration with Live Nation, Lieberberg presented the "popular" Canadian Cirque du Soleil production Saltimbanco, which was performed inside arenas for a series of shows, including at Hamburg's Colour Line Arena and O_{2} World Berlin in 2010. He organised the MMA event UFC 122, which took place in November 2010 at the König-Pilsener Arena in Oberhausen. From 2011, he was responsible for the tour of Cirque du Soleil's production, Alegría, throughout Germany, which was presented in Frankfurt, Mannheim, Hamburg, Hanover, and Nuremberg, as well as Vienna, Austria. Lieberberg, described by Hans Riebsamen of Frankfurter Allgemeine Zeitung as [Fritz] Rau's "legitimate successor", took on the role of "Primo Impresario" by touring the Quidam production by Cirque du Soleil in Germany and Austria in 2013. Due to Operation Protective Edge and the resulting safety issues, Lieberberg and his peer, Shuki Weiss, cancelled Cirque du Soleil's Quidam show, scheduled from 6 to 21 August 2014, at the Nokia Arena in Tel Aviv, and postpone it until 2015. At the 2015 Live Entertainment Award, Lieberberg won Show of the Year 2014 for Cirque du Soleil's Koozå.

=== 2020s ===
Lieberberg promoted the Cirque du Soleil show Totem via Live Nation Germany, scheduled to run from February 2020 to 22 March 2020 on Munich's Theresienwiese. Capacity was abruptly reduced from 2,400 to 1,000 seats by the government due to coronavirus measures, while most shows were sold out. As a result, Lieberberg and his team attempted to reschedule ticket holders' reservations to later dates, while the government simultaneously reduced the allowed capacity to 500. Lieberberg had long wanted to establish a permanent home for Cirque du Soleil in Germany. From May 2020, Frankfurt-based Live Nation Germany operated Berlin's Theatre am Potsdamer Platz on Marlene-Dietrich-Platz, renting it for more than five years. Lieberberg was scheduled to present Nysa, the first European permanent representation of Cirque du Soleil developed specifically for Berlin, debuting on 28 October 2020 at the Theatre am Potsdamer Platz. However, the Nysa project was put on hold when the coronavirus pandemic hit. In September 2025, a preview of the first three excerpts from Cirque du Soleil's Alizé show was presented at the Theatre am Potsdamer Platz. This preview was followed by a press conference held by Lieberberg and Fabrice Becker, vice president of Cirque du Soleil. The world premiere of Alizé took place on 20 November at the Theatre am Potsdamer Platz, in collaboration with Live Nation [Germany], as many Cirque du Soleil productions have been "great success" in Berlin. Lieberberg not only targeted Berlin and German audiences but also promoted the show internationally. Lieberberg was a co-producer of Alizé, whose production costs were in the "high double-digit million range", with performances scheduled through August 2026.

== Personal views ==
=== 2011 Live Entertainment Award ===
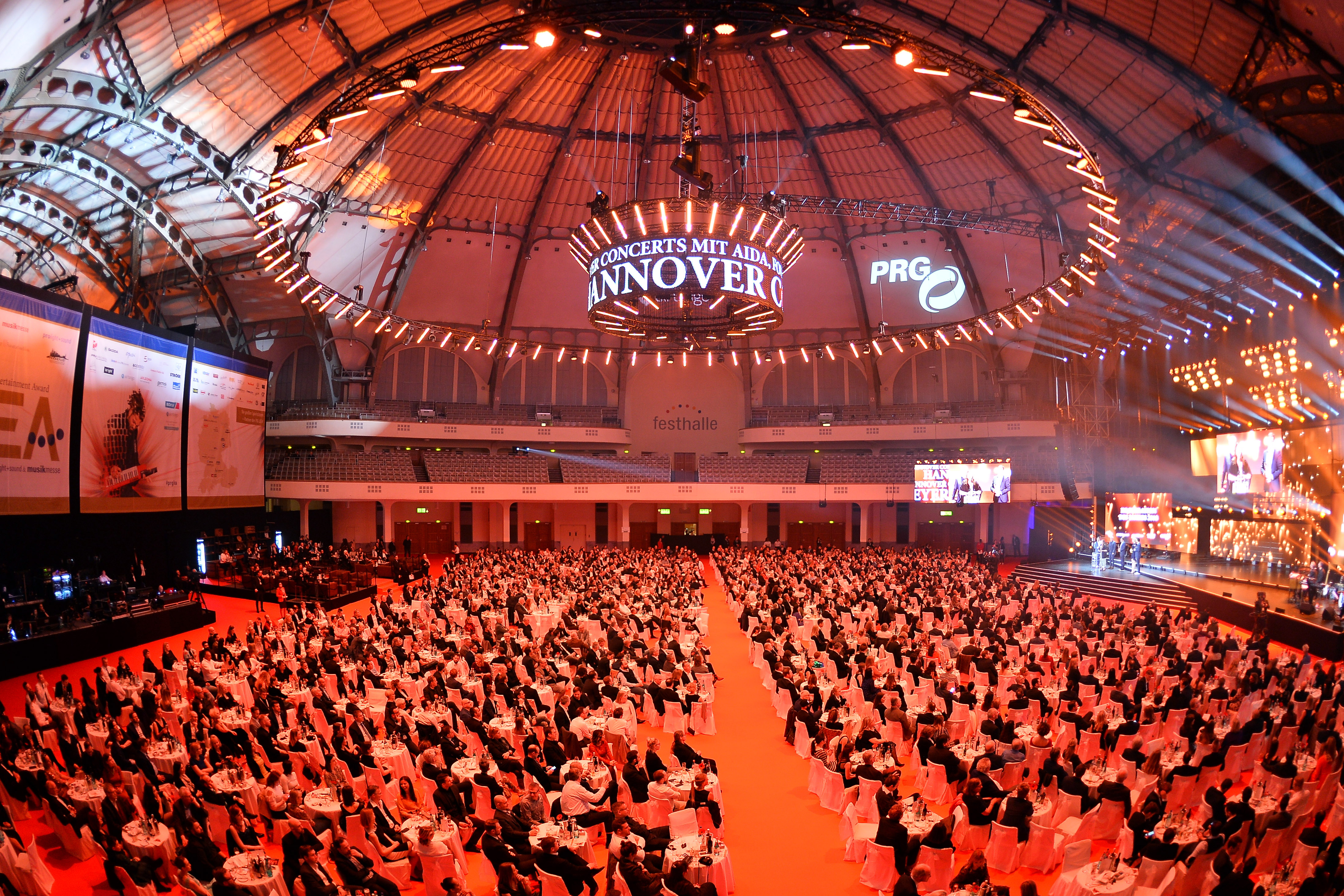
Lieberberg was a vocal critic of Germany's Live Entertainment Award in 2011

On 5 April 2011, Lieberberg received a Live Entertainment Award in Frankfurt, "in recognition of his safety record over the last 25 years of promoting the Rock am Ring concert", as well as the Lebenswerk (lit. 'Life's Work') Award. He declined both awards, however. Katharina Miklis of Hamburger Abendblatt called him the "Reich Ranicki of the music branch". He had previously asked CEO LEA Jens Michow to refrain from considering him for these awards. Still, the organisation had not given up on its intention to honour Lieberberg, prompting him to defend his position publicly. He considered his Lebenswerk Award "unserious" as he was far from having completed his professional career. He described "obscure categories" dictated by "unclear criteria" and felt that some awards have been "invented just for the laureates". Lieberberg saw the "impudence" from the LEA, which awarded him the "special prize for the safety concept" even though the event's organisers had not been aware of his Rock am Ring concept, nor had they ever examined or questioned it. In light of the Duisburg Love Parade disaster, Michow stressed that the category served as a signal to the events industry. Lieberberg expressed his discomfort, saying he felt "abused" if he had to address the Love Parade disaster at the gala event. Michow, however, stated that the jury's future decisions regarding Lieberberg's work for a nomination and potential award would remain unaffected.

=== Antisemitism and managing controversies ===
==== Roger Waters ====
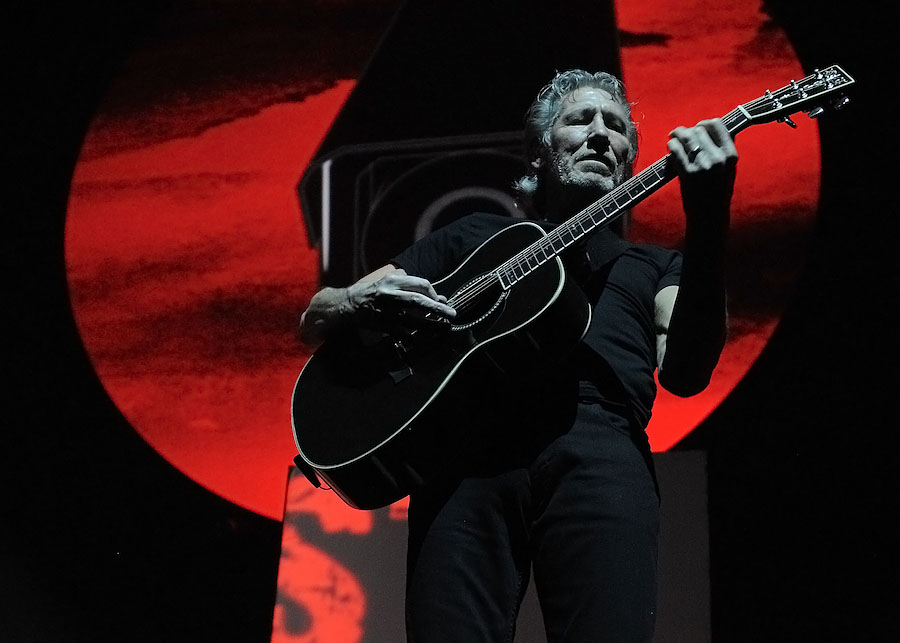
Despite their personal disagreements, Liebeberg firmly defended Roger Waters in the media

During The Wall concerts in 2013, Liebeberg stated that he did not believe Waters was an anti-Semite; however, he informed him that using an inflatable pig adorned with a Star of David in his performance could be regarded as offensive. The tensions led to a mutual "agreeing to disagree", and communication ended at that point. Liebeberg had to perform his professional duties while Mayor Dirk Elbers, a representative of the Christian Democrat party, voiced his concerns, and a Jewish group in Düsseldorf called for a boycott of Waters's concert at the Esprit Arena. Liebeberg had already endured protests against Waters during his previous visits to Germany and said he was "stuck in the middle of it". In 2013, Liebeberg also found no relevance in drawing parallels between Israel and South Africa under apartheid.

He defended Waters in November 2017 when WDR decided to pull the broadcast of his June 2018 concert in Cologne due to allegations of antisemitism. Several broadcasters followed suit amidst protests and a petition against Waters. Lieberberg said that "Two things must be separated here: personal opinion and artistic work", while rejecting the Boycott, Divestment and Sanctions (BDS) movement supported by Waters. Lieberberg called on broadcasters to instead highlight the "partly bloodthirsty anti-Semitic theories" of [Martin] Luther and [Richard] Wagner. Jens Balzer of Die Zeit wrote shortly after that Lieberberg "tried to reinterpret" Waters "as an innocent victim whose right to free speech is to be curtailed by evil do-gooders". Lieberberg stated that German Jews were justified in their concerns about "clearly visible and growing antisemitism" in the country, amidst rising support for the far-right Alternative for Germany (AfD) political party. Nevertheless, he maintained that Waters "has a right to freedom of opinion".

Subsequently, Lieberberg had not taken charge of the German dates of Waters' This Is Not a Drill tour. As for whether their 53-year collaboration had ended, he succinctly stated that they were no longer together.

==== Xavier Naidoo ====
Naidoo's selection for the 2016 Eurovision Song Contest (ESC) sparked reactions, particularly over the content of his songs, with one in which he used the label "Baron Deadschild" to describe the German-Jewish Rothschild family and another that led critics to accuse him of linking homosexuality with pedophilia. Naidoo had previously been called upon to stay distant from the Reichsbürger organisation. Under those controversial circumstances, the ESC withdrew Naidoo from the event due to allegations of antisemitism and homophobia, a few days after his selection in late November 2015, leaving Lieberberg "shocked" by the "hypocrisy" and "blind hatred" that erupted, given that the two had worked together for more than 20 years. A few days after the musician's disinvitation, Lieberberg had his page published in the Frankfurter Allgemeine Zeitung, titled "Menschen für Xavier Naidoo" (lit. 'People for Xavier Naidoo'), which listed 121 people who had expressed their support for him, including Andreas Gabalier, Mario Adorf, Delay, Jan Josef Liefers, and Til Schweiger. He nevertheless viewed Naidoo's "controversial appearance" among the Reichsbürger group in Berlin as "certainly ambivalent". Lieberberg called the ESC a "big, inflated nothingness, a European carnival without any significance for the music world" and added that "no relevant artist" had participated in the event "for decades". He asserted that Naidoo "is neither anti-Semite nor homophobic". However, in December 2015, a line in Naidoo's latest song that says, "Muslims wear the new yellow badge", prompted Lieberberg to respond, "I evaluate this statement as cynical, compulsive, and falsifying history."

==== Bob Vylan and Kneecap ====
In response to a question from Sophie Albers Ben Chamo of Jüdische Allgemeine in July 2025, Lieberberg said that he did not believe hatred of Israel and Jews was "in vogue" in performances. He further said, however, that Bob Vylan and Kneecap "have no relevance at all, neither musically nor intellectually. They derive their only 'Claim to Fame' from their tirades towards Israel, the IDF or Jews per se". He called both bands "insignificant phenomena in the music business". On the one hand, he considered Dylan and Grateful Dead to have "ingenious songs and articulated views" that had "political impact", which in turn engendered fan enthusiasm. On the other hand, he viewed Bob Vylan and Kneecap as having "nothing to offer except hatred and incitement" to seek "attention" and achieve "commercial success at all costs".

=== Terrorism ===
In 2015, Lieberberg commented on a heavily guarded Jewish kindergarten in Frankfurt that his grandchildren frequented daily, as well as the police protection required to enter synagogues during holidays. "To my knowledge", he stated, "not a single mosque" required such surveillance measures.

==== 2015 speech on Paris attacks ====
Shortly after the November 2015 Paris attacks, Lieberberg stated that the cultural sector and all areas of public life were not prepared to face terrorist acts of such brutal violence as the one that had just occurred. He asked the police to ensure the protection of events in Germany because sufficient security precautions adequate to a normal situation, whether with bare hands or with metal detectors, would not allow for defence against Kalashnikovs and bombs in the event of an Islamist terrorist attack. Lieberberg argued that cancelling numerous concerts was an inappropriate response to the Paris attacks, having himself put it into practice on the evening of 11 September, when he did not abort a Depeche Mode concert in Vienna, in agreement with the band, as an act of freedom.

==== 2017 speech at Rock am Ring ====
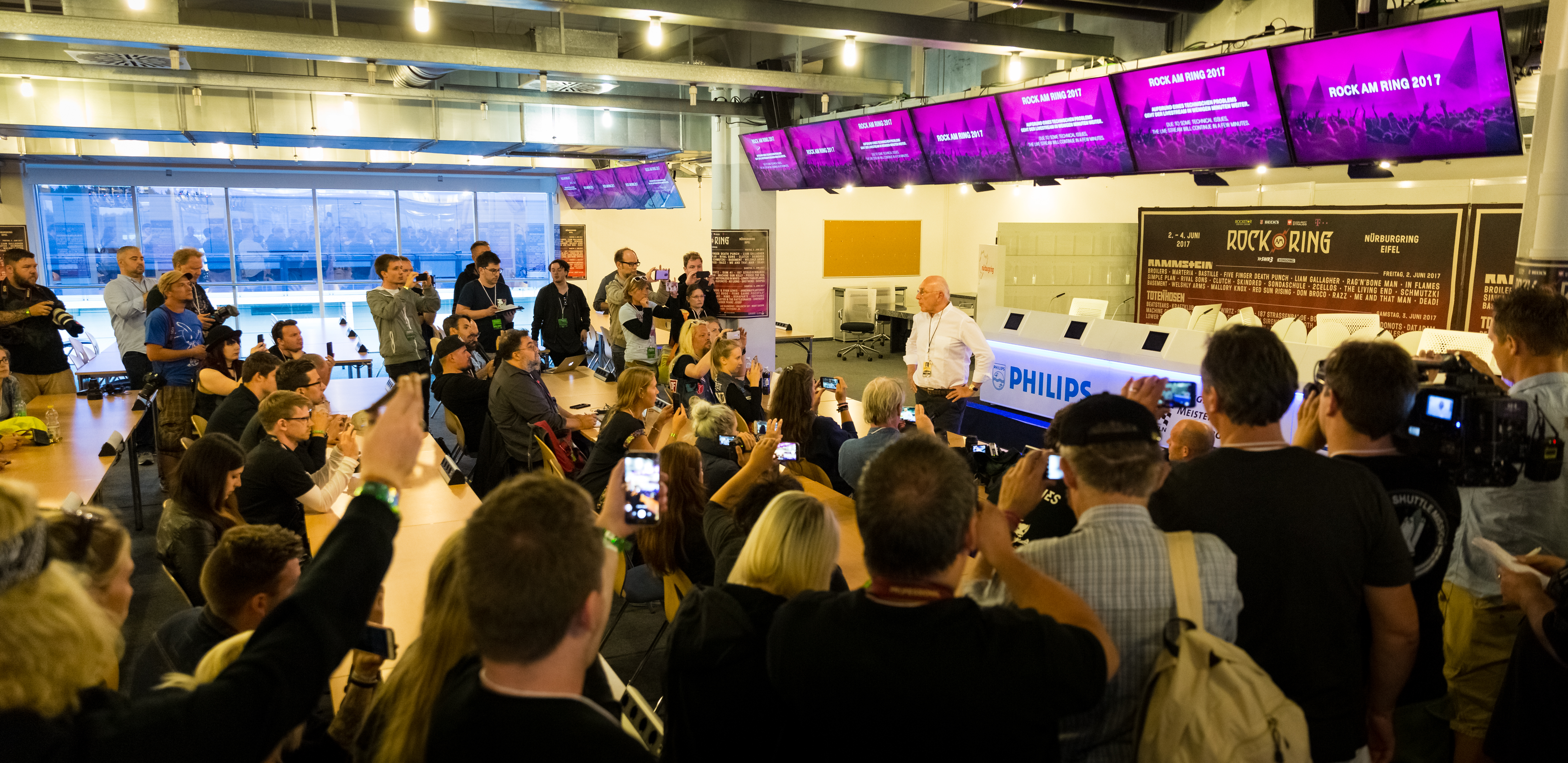
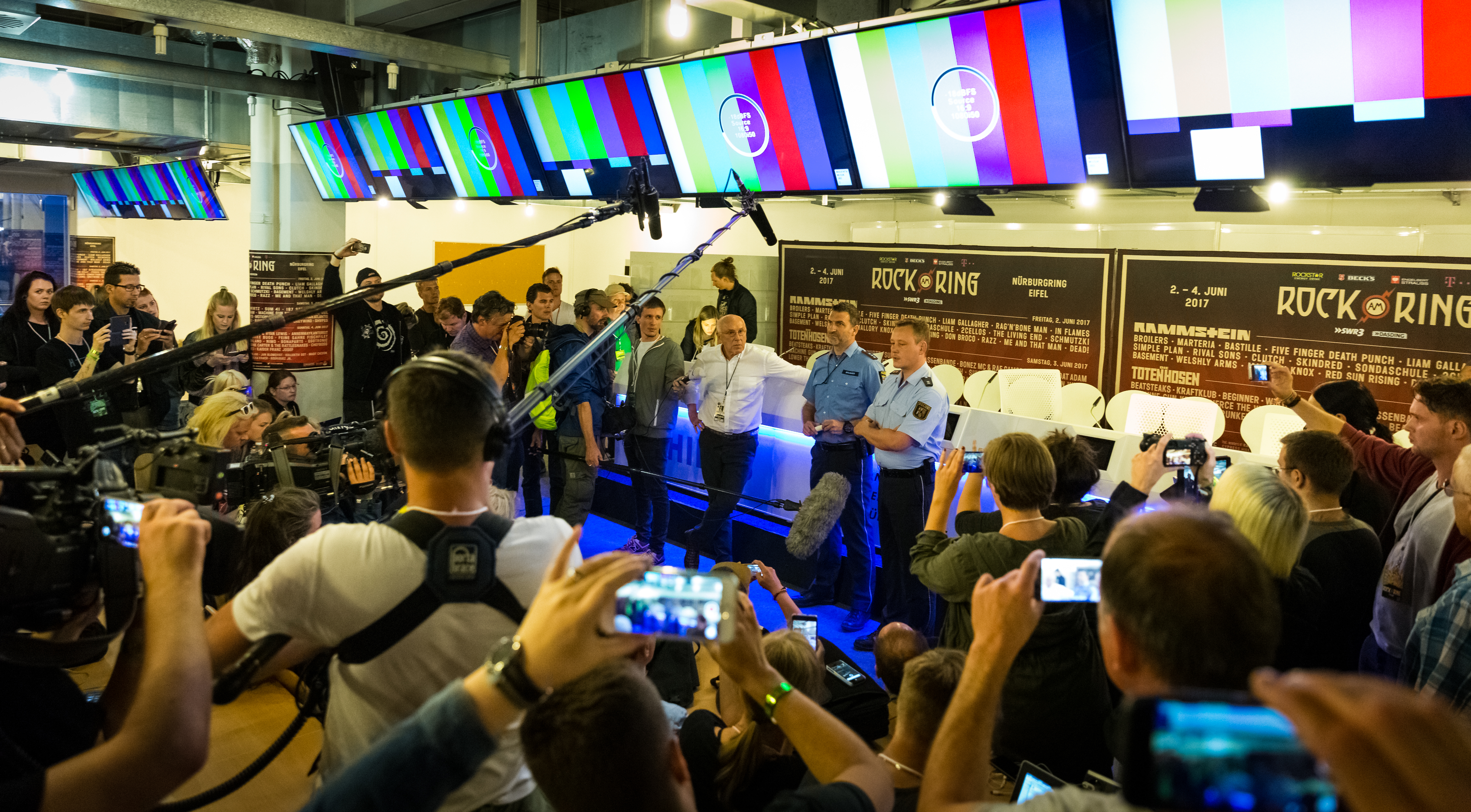
Lieberberg and police officers holding a press conference at the Rock am Ring festival, 2 June 2017

At the beginning of June 2017, before the Rock am Ring festival opened, a police patrol checked the identity of a group of Salafists in Koblenz who were in possession of access badges and backstage passes. Special police forces searched the apartments of suspects on Friday. Following the interruption of the Rock am Ring festival on Friday evening due to an assessment of a potential terrorist threat, a press conference was held, at which Lieberberg delivered a speech that garnered attention in Germany. Police had no definitive clues at this stage, however. Lieberberg lost his temper in front of the press, stating in English that people must put an end to the generally accepted maxim that "This is not my Islam and this is not my shit and this is not my whatever." He described a "situation where each individual must articulate themselves against it" and said he "at last" wanted to see demonstrations "directed against these violent criminals". He further said: "I have not seen so far Muslims who have taken to the streets in their tens of thousands and have said, 'What are you actually doing?'".

Lieberberg reacted "emotionally" to the authorities' order for precautions for Friday, while other decisions were not due to be made until Saturday. The authorities were "overcautious", he said, adding, "We pay the price for the scandal surrounding Amri", referring to the prior negligence preceding the December 2016 attack on Berlin's Breitscheidplatz. He asked whether it was defensive democracy that had led to this and said Germany had sent a "catastrophic" signal. Lieberberg felt "appallingly empty and exhausted". He denounced the accommodations granted to football compared to cultural events, in an indirect reference to the German football team Borussia Dortmund, which was able to play its Champions League match the day after its bus was attacked. He then asked the assembly what the reason was for them being the "whipping boys for the situation".

Journalists wrote shortly afterwards that it was an angry speech and that he had lost control of himself. Benedict Neff, Germany correspondent for Neue Zürcher Zeitung, wrote in Basler Zeitung that "Perhaps Lieberberg's speech was one of the more important political speeches that was held in Germany in 2017, just because it was unprepared and uncontrolled, because it came from an engaged citizen and not from a politician." Lieberberg told the Süddeutsche Zeitung soon after that he may have overstepped the bounds. The youth-oriented portal Bento of Der Spiegel's website published a list of demonstrations in which Muslims participated and demanded an apology directed towards that community. He inadvertently aligned himself with the AfD by echoing a popular stance that the party had asserted. Although the AfD picked up his statements regarding Muslims on its social networks, Lieberberg categorically opposed being cornered by the far-right populist party, stating that he had neither defamed nor marginalised anyone.

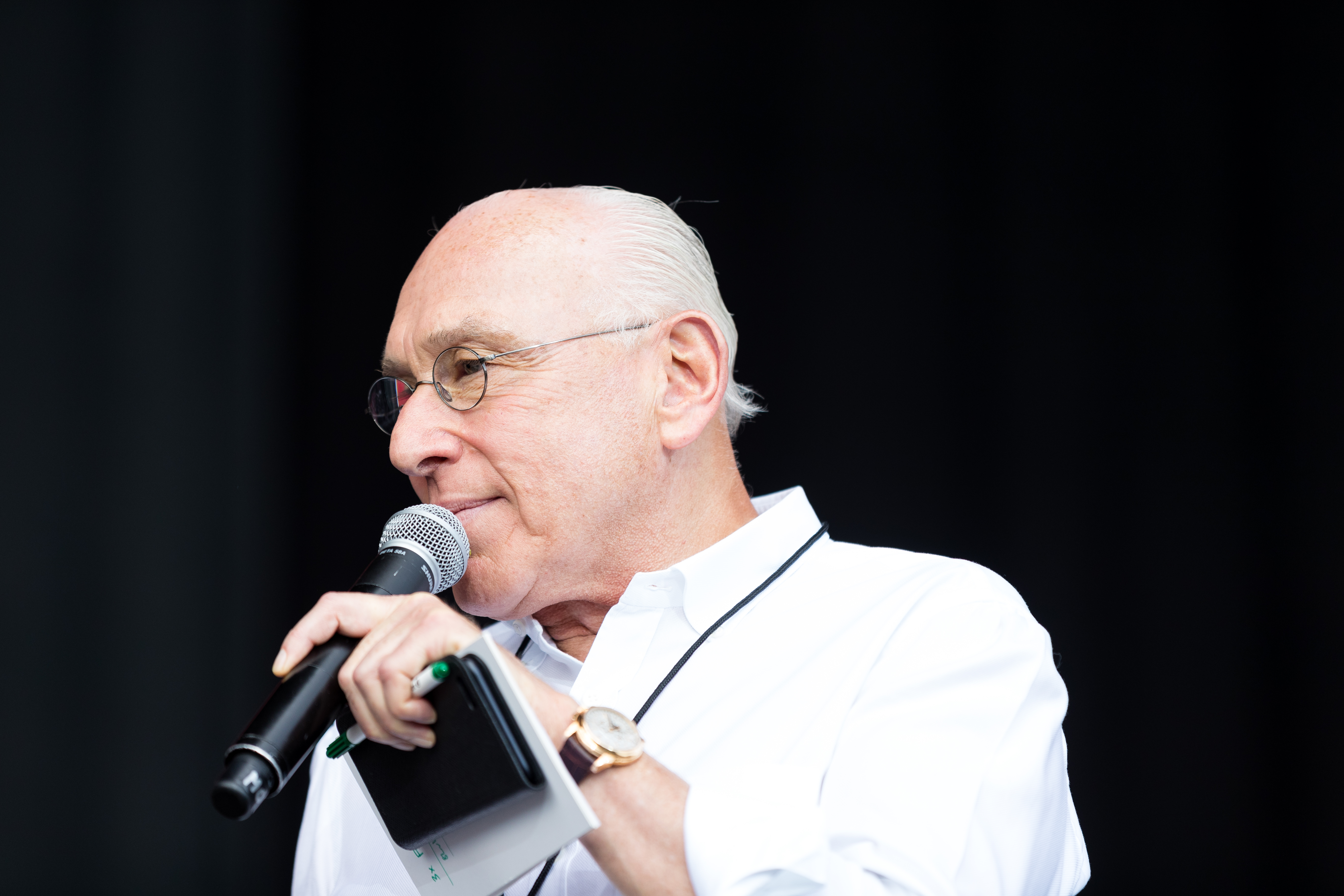
Lieberberg's speech at the Rock am Ring 2017 press conference was met with divided opinions, but found resonance in the Muslim peace marches that followed the London and Manchester terror attacks

Anna Sauerbrey of Der Tagesspiegel said that although Lieberberg's position in favour of demarcation had received "applause", it had also aroused "suspicion", intentionally or not, because it came from the "non-Muslim majority society". A few days after Lieberberg's speech, 150 members of Hanover's Muslim communities took part in a peaceful and silent march through the city centre against the recent terrorist attacks in London and Manchester. The Muslim community came up with the idea of expressing its opposition to terrorism with banners and placards during the march in Hanover in direct response to Lieberberg's speech deploring the lack of a clear Muslim position on terrorist acts. Mohammed-Afzal Qureshi of the Mosque Association, who had followed Lieberberg's vehement speech at the Rock am Ring festival, said: "This is exactly what will happen now."

In mid-June, a peace march titled "#NotWithUs – Muslims and friends against violence and terror", a call to Muslims to take a position against terrorism, was launched in Cologne with a smaller turnout than expected despite great "media hype". Lamya Kaddor, an Islamic scholar and initiator of the Cologne peace march, felt offended by Lieberberg's statement, perceiving it as a "generalisation" of Muslims' responsibility, potentially arousing widespread suspicion of these communities in Germany and benefiting Islamists. Marc Röhlig of Der Spiegel pointed out that the march appeared to be a "concession" to Lieberberg. Kaddor denied that it was related to his speech, but added that he had ultimately "signed" their call for the demonstration. Writing for Die Zeit, Canan Topçu was not convinced that the idea of the Cologne peace march was not linked to Lieberberg's appeal, citing the short time interval between the two events.

=== Pandemic and politics ===
Lieberberg occasionally enters German political debates from a liberal standpoint. During the promotion of the Munich production of Cirque du Soleil's Totem show in 2020, capacity was repeatedly reduced by the German government due to the coronavirus pandemic, with Lieberberg describing the situation as a "game of cat-and-mouse" that persisted "in variations but with the same results". Despite this, he maintained that he was not a "Corona-denier". When announcing his Give Live a Chance concert, scheduled for September 2020 in Düsseldorf amidst the pandemic, Karl-Josef Laumann, Minister of Health of North Rhine-Westphalia, expressed his dissatisfaction by questioning the legal basis of the event and warning of its significant risk. Düsseldorf's Mayor Thomas Geisel found no legal issue, as the City of Düsseldorf concluded that this conformed to the regulations of the Corona Protection Ordinance. Negative reactions from the region's politicians left Lieberberg in a state of incomprehension, believing that a conflict of interest arising from the upcoming local elections was partly to blame for the controversy. He said political affiliations divided the "proponents and opponents" of his concert.

German professionals in the live music industry faced challenges in securing government financial support during the pandemic, he said, because they had to prove their ability to repay in a context where it was impossible to project future income for the events sector. Lieberberg described this "type of bureaucracy" as "grotesque" but praised the German party Bündnis 90/Die Grünen's 10-point plan for saving the country's live music sector. In March 2022, Lieberberg discussed the coronavirus prevention measures affecting the event industry in Germany, which he said had "eroded the professional structures of modern music culture", as well as the rejection of reopening requests, which he attributed to the "fear and apathy of those politically responsible".

== Personal life ==
Lieberberg had a relationship with [Ute] Lemper while he was her manager. The negative reviews Lemper received for her 1992 performances infuriated him, which deteriorated their relationship and led to their separation.

He has been married to Ingrid. By 1998, the couple had been visiting Maui for 18 years, living on the island for four months a year. In 1998, he resided in Wailea, Maui, when he was not in Frankfurt. He has three sons, all of whom hold positions of responsibility in the events and music industry. (Note: His oldest son, Daniel Lieberberg, commenced his career as a booker and talent buyer for Marek Lieberberg Konzertagentur in 1998. He left his father's business in 2002 to become a marketing director at Universal Music. After 16 years at Universal Music Germany, he was appointed president of Continental Europe and Africa at Sony Music Entertainment in January 2018.)

By 2010, Lieberberg's tastes had shifted primarily to classical music.

== As a musician ==
Before he entered the field of journalism, Lieberberg began as a band member during the early years of the beat music movement. He was a member of a band named Mike Lee and the Echos and toured the German provinces. He was the frontman of the Rangers, a Beatles-inspired band. The Rangers reached the final round of a competition at the Star-Club in Hamburg, and Lieberberg enjoyed relatively modest fame in and around Frankfurt.

From 1964 to 1967, he played in the Rangers band alongside Ludwig Ickert, Robert Wolf, Jürgen Kessner, and Axel Schürmann. They also named themselves the Trembles and the Sad Sack Set. On 21 October 1966, they were guests on the German television show Beat Beat Beat. The band is also featured in the book Die Beat Bible. CBS sued them on 24 February 1967 because the name of a band under CBS's contract sounded very similar. They lost the case and gave the money they had earned by selling their music to CBS. They renamed it "New Rangers," but the band split up shortly after.

== Discography ==
- Lovers Of The World Unite (1966)
- The Trembles − Here Comes My Baby / Baby Stop That Playin' Around (7" Single, 1967)
- The Rangers − Black Is Black (7" Single 1966)
- The Rangers − I Found a Love (7" Single, 1967)
- Sad Sack Set − Number One / The World For Us (7" Single, 1967)
- The Rangers − The Rangers (LP)
- The Rangers − These Boots Are Made For Walking (1967)
- The Rangers − Very Last Day (1967)
- The Rangers − Look Through Any Window (1967)
- The Rangers − Long Valley Road (1993)

== Written works ==
- Scholz, Martin; Lieberberg, Marek; Larmann, Ralph (1993). Heute die! Morgen Du! Deutschsprachige Künstler gegen Rechtsradikalismus: Dokumentation eines Open Air Konzerts im Dezember '92 [Them today! You tomorrow! German-speaking Artists Against Right-wing Radicalism: Documentation of an Open Air Concert in December '92] (in German). Illustrated by Campino. Vienna: Paul Zsolnay Verlag. ISBN 978-3-552-05132-4.

== See also ==
- Live Nation Entertainment
