= 24th Berlin International Film Festival =

1974 film festival in West Berlin, Germany

- Festival poster
- Location: West Berlin, Germany
- Founded: 1951
- Awards: Golden Bear: The Apprenticeship of Duddy Kravitz
- Festival date: 21 June – 2 July 1974
- Website: Website

Berlin International Film Festival chronology
- 25th 23rd

The 24th annual Berlin International Film Festival was held from 21 June to 2 July 1974.

The Golden Bear was awarded to The Apprenticeship of Duddy Kravitz directed by Ted Kotcheff.

== Juries ==
The following people were announced as being on the jury for the festival:

=== Main Competition ===
- Rodolfo Kuhn, Argentinian filmmaker - Jury President
- Margaret Hinxmann, British writer and film critic
- Pietro Bianchi, Italian journalist and film critic
- Gérard Ducaux-Rupp, French producer
- Kurt Heinz, West-German composer
- Akira Iwasaki, Japanese historian and film critic
- Arthur Knight, American historian and film critic
- Manfred Purzer, West German filmmaker
- Piet Ruivenkamp, Dutch film critic

== Official Sections ==
=== Main Competition ===
The following films were in competition for the Golden Bear award:

English Title	Original Title	Director(s)	Production Country
A Handful of Love	En handfull kärlek	Vilgot Sjöman	Sweden
The Amlash Enchanted Forest	העיר יער קסום	Shlomo Suriano	Israel
Ankur	अंकुर	Shyam Benegal	India
A Performance of Hamlet in the Village of Mrduša Donja	Predstava Hamleta u selu Mrduša Donja	Krsto Papić	Yugoslavia
The Apprenticeship of Duddy Kravitz		Ted Kotcheff	Canada
Black Thursday	Les Guichets du Louvre	Michel Mitrani	France
Bobby's War	Bobbys krig	Arnljot Berg	Norway
Bread and Chocolate	Pane e cioccolata	Franco Brusati	Italy
Charley One-Eye		Don Chaffey	United Kingdom, United States
The Clockmaker	L'horloger de Saint-Paul	Bertrand Tavernier	France
The Conscript	De loteling	Roland Verhavert	Belgium
The Earth Is a Sinful Song	Maa on syntinen laulu	Rauni Mollberg	Finland
Effi Briest	Fontane Effi Briest	Rainer Werner Fassbinder	West Germany
In the Name of the People	Im Namen des Volkes	Ottokar Runze	West Germany
Little Malcolm		Stuart Cooper	United Kingdom
The Love of Captain Brando	El amor del capitán Brando	Jaime de Armiñán	Spain
The Pelican	Le Pélican	Gérard Blain	France
Rebellion in Patagonia	La Patagonia rebelde	Héctor Olivera	Argentina
Rise, Fair Sun	朝やけの詩	Kei Kumai	Japan
Sagarana: The Duel	Sagarana, o Duelo	Paulo Thiago	Brazil
Still Life	طبیعت بی‌جان	Sohrab Shahid-Saless	Iran
There Is No 13		William Sachs	United States
Two		Charles Trieschmann	United States
Zeami	世阿彌	Susumu Harada	Japan

=== Out of Competition ===
- With You and Without You, directed by Rodion Nakhapetov (Soviet Union)

== Official Awards ==
The following prizes were awarded by the Jury:

- Golden Bear: The Apprenticeship of Duddy Kravitz by Ted Kotcheff
- Silver Bear – Special Jury Prize: The Clockmaker by Bertrand Tavernier
- Silver Bear:
  - Bread and Chocolate by Franco Brusati
  - Still Life by Sohrab Shahid-Saless
  - Little Malcolm by Stuart Cooper
  - In the Name of the People by Ottokar Runze
  - Rebellion in Patagonia by Héctor Olivera

== Independent Awards ==
=== FIPRESCI Award ===
- Still Life by Sohrab Shahid-Saless
