= In the Name of the People =

In the Name of the People can refer to:

- In the Name of the People (1939 film), a German film
- In the Name of the People (1974 film), a German documentary film
- In the Name of the People (1985 film), an American documentary film
- In the Name of the People (2000 film), an American television film
- In the Name of the People (TV series), a 2017 Chinese television series
