= Trieschmann =

Trieschmann is a surname. Notable people with the surname include:

- Burke Trieschmann, American composer and sound designer
- Charles Trieschmann (1920–2015), American author
