= Lost Life =

Lost Life may refer to:

- A Lost Life, a 1976 West German drama film directed by Ottokar Runze
- The Lost Life, a 2006 documentary film about Indian director J.C. Daniel
