= Gerhard Olschewski =

German actor (born 1942)

- Born: 30 May 1942 (age 84); Herzogskirchen, East Prussia, Germany (now Gąski, Poland)
- Occupation: Actor
- Years active: 1966–present

Gerhard Olschewski (born 30 May 1942) is a German actor. He has appeared in more than 90 films and television shows since 1966. He starred in the 1976 film A Lost Life, which was entered into the 26th Berlin International Film Festival, where he won the Silver Bear for Best Actor.

== Selected filmography ==
- Einmal im Leben – Geschichte eines Eigenheims (1972, TV miniseries)
- A Lost Life (1976)
- Petty Thieves (1977)
- Halbe-Halbe (1977)
- Der Geist der Mirabelle (1978, TV film)
- The Murderer (1979)
- High Society Limited (1982)
- Nesthäkchen (1983)
- Strange Fruits (1983)
- White Trash (1983)
- The Sprinter (1984)
- The Black Cannon Incident (1985)
- Der Landarzt (1987–2013, TV series, 241 episodes)
- Hate in the Head (1994, TV film)
- Hallo Robbie! (2001–2009, TV series, 67 episodes)
- Schroeder's Wonderful World (2006)
