= Two (1974 film) =

1974 film

- Directed by: Charles Trieschmann
- Written by: Charles Trieschmann
- Produced by: Charles Trieschmann
- Starring: Sara Venable
- Cinematography: Vilis Lapenieks
- Edited by: David E. McKenna
- Release date: September 1974
- Running time: 93 minutes
- Country: United States
- Language: English

Two is a 1974 American drama film directed by Charles Trieschmann and starring Sara Venable. It was entered into the 24th Berlin International Film Festival.

== Cast ==
- Sara Venable - Ellen
- Douglas Travis - Steven
- Clifford Villeneuve - Irate Driver
- Ray Houle - Doctor Dudley
- Florence Hadley - Hardware Customer
- William Green - Husband
- Thelma Green - Wife
- Sylvia Harman - Bank Teller
- Elwyn Miller - Guard
- Jack Dykeman - Man in Bank
- Stanley McIntyre - Chief of Police
- Fred Gilbert - Policeman
- Winston Merrill - Postal Clerk
