= British Rock Meeting =

The British Rock Meeting was a recurring multi-day outdoor rock festival usually held in Germany, which began in 1971.

== History ==
Organised by concert promoters Marek Lieberberg and Marcel Avram, the first British Rock Meeting took place in September 1971 in Speyer. It featured Black Sabbath, Fleetwood Mac, Rod Stewart, and Deep Purple. The 1971 festival attracted 25,000 people and was one of the first major German rock festivals, as well as a "political issue".

The second edition took place on the island of Grün near Germersheim, located between Karlsruhe and Speyer, in May 1972, and was organised by Lieberberg and Avram. Featuring Pink Floyd, the Doors, and the Faces, the 1972 British Rock Meeting drew a crowd of 100,000. Süddeutsche Zeitung's Anja Perkuhn wrote that the 1972 British Rock Meeting was "the mother of all German rock festivals".. A third edition, planned for September 22-23, 1973, was cancelled after support for the show from the US military was withdrawn, creating concerns about attendance.

Some other bands featured at these events included Rory Gallagher, Uriah Heep and Beggars Opera Status Quo.

The last British Rock Meeting was a two-day event produced on 23 June 1979 at the Freilichtbühne Loreley in St. Goarshausen, Germany, and the next day on 24 June, in Westfalenhalle, Dortmund. Some notable performers at this event included Whitesnake, the Police, Dire Straits, Talking Heads, Barclay James Harvest, Sniff 'n' the Tears and Dr. Feelgood.

The British Rock Meeting remained for a long time the last multi-day open-air event in Germany until the founding of the Rock am Ring festival.
