= Utopia (1983 film) =

1983 film

- Directed by: Sohrab Shahid-Saless
- Written by: Manfred Grunert; Sohrab Shahid-Saless
- Produced by: Renée Gundelach
- Starring: Manfred Zapatka
- Cinematography: Ramin Reza Molai
- Edited by: Christel Orthmann
- Release date: 20 May 1983
- Running time: 198 minutes
- Country: West Germany
- Language: German

Utopia is a 1982 West German drama film directed by Sohrab Shahid-Saless. It was entered 1983 into the 33rd Berlin International Film Festival.

== Cast ==
- Manfred Zapatka as Heinz
- Imke Barnstedt as Renate
- Gundula Petrovska as Rosi
- Gabriele Fischer as Susi
- Johanna Sophia as Helga
- Birgit Anders as Monika
