= Ottokar Runze =

German film producer, director and screenwriter

- Born: 19 August 1925; Berlin, Germany
- Died: 22 September 2018 (aged 93); Neustrelitz, Germany
- Occupations: Film producer, director, screenwriter
- Years active: 1950–2001

Ottokar Runze (19 August 1925 – 22 September 2018) was a German film producer, director and screenwriter. His 1974 film In the Name of the People was entered into the 24th Berlin International Film Festival, where it won the Silver Bear. The following year, he was a member of the jury at the 25th Berlin International Film Festival.

== Selected filmography ==
- Five Suspects (dir. Kurt Hoffmann, 1950, producer)
- Viola and Sebastian (1972) — loosely based on Shakespeare's Twelfth Night
- Der Lord von Barmbeck (1974)
- In the Name of the People (1974)
- Knife in the Back (1975)
- A Lost Life (1976)
- The Standard (1977) — based on The Standard by Alexander Lernet-Holenia
- The Murderer (1979) — based on a novel by Georges Simenon
- Star Without a Sky (1980) — based on Stern ohne Himmel by Leonie Ossowski
- High Society Limited (1982)
- Non-Stop Trouble with Spies (1983)
- Ein heikler Fall (1986–1988, TV series)
- Embezzled Heaven (1990, TV film) — based on a novel by Franz Werfel
- Die Hallo-Sisters (1990)
- Linda (1992)
- Goldstaub (1993, TV film)
- Tatort: Laura, mein Engel (1994, TV series episode)
- 100 Jahre Brecht (1998) — based on works by Bertolt Brecht
- The Volcano (1999) — based on a novel by Klaus Mann
