= High Society Limited =

- Directed by: Ottokar Runze
- Written by: Richard Hey
- Produced by: Ottokar Runze
- Starring: Elisabeth Bergner; Lilli Palmer; Hardy Krüger
- Cinematography: Michael Epp
- Music by: Hans-Martin Majewski
- Production companies: Ottokar Runze Filmproduktion; Zweites Deutsches Fernsehen
- Release date: 12 March 1982
- Running time: 104 minutes
- Country: West Germany
- Language: German

High Society Limited (German: Feine Gesellschaft - beschränkte Haftung) is a 1982 West German comedy film directed by Ottokar Runze and starring Elisabeth Bergner, Lilli Palmer and Hardy Krüger.

== Cast ==
- Elisabeth Bergner as Else
- Lilli Palmer as Hilde
- Heinz Schubert as Kolbe
- Hardy Krüger as Harms
- Wolf Roth as Moll
- Hans Caninenberg as Petersen
- Vadim Glowna as Raimund
- Gerhard Olschewski as Hinrich
- Marianne Klein-Benrath as Bröse
- Uwe Dallmeier as Chef der Demolierer
- Hans Irle as Kassierer

== Bibliography ==
- Bock, Hans-Michael & Bergfelder, Tim. The Concise CineGraph. Encyclopedia of German Cinema. Berghahn Books, 2009.
