= Still Life (1974 film) =

- Directed by: Sohrab Shahid-Saless
- Written by: Sohrab Shahid-Saless
- Produced by: Parviz Sayyad
- Starring: Zadour Bonyadi
- Cinematography: Houshang Baharlou
- Edited by: Ruhallah Emami
- Release date: June 1974
- Running time: 93 minutes
- Country: Iran
- Language: Persian

Still Life (Persian: طبیعت بی‌جان, romanized: Tabiate bijan) is a 1974 Iranian film directed by Sohrab Shahid-Saless.

== Plot ==
For more than three decades, aging Iranian Mohamad Sardari (Zadour Bonyadi) has worked as a crossing guard at a desolate train station. Through the years, Mohamad has done little to stifle the loneliness and boredom inherent in the job. Meanwhile, back at his family home, life is similarly uneventful: Mohamad's wife passes the time weaving night and day, especially since the couple's son left to join the army. As time passes, Mohamad mechanically continues to do his duty.

Early in the film, three men from the railway office come to visit Mohamad's station. The briefly question him about his age, which he does not know, and how long he has worked at the station, which he does - thirty-three years. Later, two men come to purchase a carpet that Mohamad's wife has woven. Although she wove the carpet to specification, they complain about the style of the carpet and underpay them for it. Mohamad says that they are selling it at a loss - the men respond that they don't have to sell it as they walk out with the carpet.

A young man later returns from the railway office and reads a letter to Mohamad, who cannot read himself. The letter informs him that he has been "retired." He returns home and tells his wife that he has been dismissed. A replacement station attendant arrives shortly after and eats with them, stuffing his face and chewing quickly. Mohamad then travels to the railway office to speak to the boss; but the boss simply tells him to go away. Mohamad returns home where he and his wife pack all of their belongings into a cart; they have nowhere else to go.

== Cast ==
- Zadour Bonyadi - Mohamad Sardari
- Mohammed Kani
- Hibibollah Safarian
- Habib Safaryan
- Zahra Yazdani

== Production ==
The film, produced by the Centre for Avant-Garde Filmmakers, was made in only 11 days.

== Accolades ==
It was entered into the 24th Berlin International Film Festival, where it won the Silver Bear.
