= Time of Maturity =

19756 film

- German: Reifezeit
- Directed by: Sohrab Shahid-Saless
- Written by: Sohrab Shahid-Saless; Helga Houzer
- Produced by: O. E. Kress
- Starring: Mike Henning; Eva Manhardt
- Cinematography: Ramin Reza Molai
- Edited by: Christel Orthmann
- Production company: Provobis Film
- Release date: August 1976 (Locarno)
- Running time: 108 minutes
- Country: West Germany
- Language: German

Time of Maturity (German: Reifezeit) is a German drama film, directed by Sohrab Shahid-Saless and released in 1976. One of the first films Shahid-Saless directed after immigrating to Germany from his native Iran, the film centres on the coming of age of Michael (Mike Henning), a young boy who runs errands for his blind neighbour to save up for a bicycle; meanwhile, his single mother (Eva Manhardt) has tried to shield him from knowing that she works as a prostitute.

The cast also includes Eva Lissa, Charles Hans Vogt, Heinz Lieven, Lothar Köster, Sabine Titze and Axel Brehmer in supporting roles.

The film is sometimes also known by the English title Coming of Age, although Time of Maturity is the standard English title.

It premiered in August 1976 at the Locarno Film Festival, where it received an honorable mention from the Prize of the Ecumenical Jury.

A restored version of the film was screened in 2024 at the 74th Berlin International Film Festival, and later at the 2024 Toronto International Film Festival.
