= The Black Cannon Incident =

1985 Chinese black comedy film

- Film poster
- Traditional Chinese: 黑砲事件
- Simplified Chinese: 黑砲事件
- Hanyu Pinyin: Hēi Pào Shìjiàn
- Directed by: Huang Jianxin
- Written by: Li Wei
- Produced by: Wu Tianming
- Starring: Liu Zifeng; Gerhard Olschewski; Yang Yazhou; Gao Ming
- Cinematography: Wang Xinsheng; Fei Weng
- Edited by: Chen Dali
- Production company: Xi'an Film Studio
- Release date: January 2, 1985 (China)
- Running time: 94 minutes
- Country: China
- Language: Mandarin

The Black Cannon Incident (Chinese: 黑砲事件; pinyin: Hēi Pào Shìjiàn) is a 1985 Chinese black comedy film satirizing the bureaucracy and paranoia of the Chinese authorities. Presented by Xi'an Film Studio and directed by Huang Jianxin, it stars Gao Ming, Gerhard Olschewski, and Liu Zifeng.

The film was screened out of competition at the 1987 Cannes Film Festival.

In the film, a mining engineer has the hobby of playing Chinese chess alone. After a chess piece mysteriously vanishes, he sends a telegram about searching for a missing cannon. The authorities mistake the telegram for a cryptic message, and re-assign the engineer. While the case is being investigated, an inexperienced interpreter is asked to replace the engineer in his contact with a German specialist. A mistranslation by the inept replacement leads to a faulty test run and to financial loss for the mining company.

== Plot ==
Zhao Shuxin (Liu Zifeng) is a capable engineer and German language interpreter in a mining company. He is single and has the unusual habit of playing Chinese chess alone. The chessboard and pieces are his intimate friends and have accompanied him for years. One day, when Zhao returns from a business trip, he finds one of his chess pieces, the black cannon, missing. Despite heavy rain, he immediately hurries to the postal office and sends a telegram to the hotel he stayed in previously, which reads, "Missing black cannon. 301. Searching. Zhao.", requesting the hotel's help to search for the piece in Room 301.

Unexpectedly, this ambiguous telegram arouses vigilance of the authorities and the police swiftly set up a case to investigate the so-called "Black Cannon Incident". Zhao is removed from his post and assigned somewhere else. His interpreter post is taken over by Feng Liangcai (Yang Yazhou), a tourism interpreter who has little knowledge of engineering construction. A German specialist, Hans Schmidt (Gerhard Olschewski) arrives for the second time for the WD project. To his disappointment, his former partner, Zhao, has been replaced. The new interpreter frequently makes mistakes. Frustrated, Hans insists that Zhao return. He even meets Zhao personally and asks for the resumption of their cooperation, which pushes Zhao into a quandary.

Meanwhile, the company manager Li Renzhong (Gao Ming) visits Zhao and accidentally finds the chess set with the missing black cannon. Thus the puzzle seems resolved. In a Party committee meeting, Li suggests Zhao resume his post as interpreter. However, Zhou Yuzhen, the Party Chief, insists no further actions will be taken until the incident is completely straightened out. At the moment, the pitiful Zhao still knows nothing about the case. The only thing he can do now is to inspect the progress of the project stealthily at midnight with a flashlight and to garner information during a brief meeting with Hans. The new interpreter, Feng, mistakenly translates "bearing" into "bracket", leading to serious damage to the parts during a test run, as well as severe financial loss.

Before long, the postal office brings a package to Zhao, and Zhou and the others covertly open it, only to find a Black Cannon chess piece. The case is now completely clear, and Zhou grumbles to Zhao that he shouldn't have sent such a telegram. Apparently puzzled, Zhao asks, "Why can't I send a telegram of my own?"

== Cast ==
- Liu Zifeng
- Gerhard Olschewski
- Yang Yazhou
- Gao Ming
