= Marius Müller-Westernhagen =

German singer and actor (born 1948)

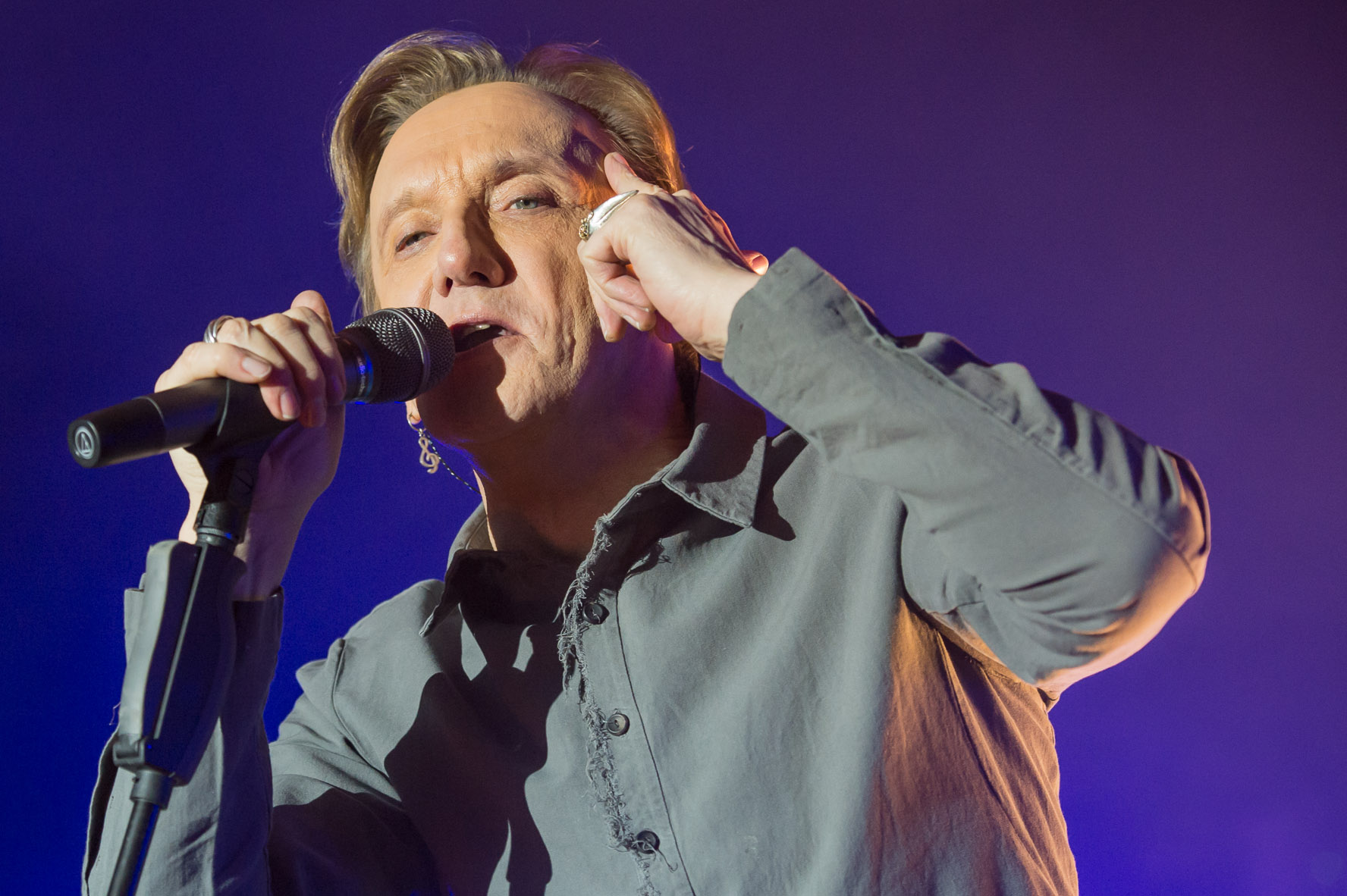
- Müller-Westernhagen in 2014

Background information
- Born: Marius Hubertus Hans Müller-Westernhagen; 6 December 1948 (age 77); Düsseldorf, Germany
- Genre: Rock
- Occupations: Singer, actor
- Years active: 1970s–present
- Website: www.westernhagen.de

Marius Hubertus Hans Müller-Westernhagen (born 6 December 1948) is a German musician and actor. He has been a feature in German rock music since the mid-1970s. Müller-Westernhagen is known for his energetic public concerts, and his fans know his anthem-like songs by heart. Though written a few years earlier, his song "Freiheit" ("Freedom") is widely considered as an anthem of the German Reunification. Since the late 1980s, he has also been known mononymously as Westernhagen.

While keeping away from the merely fashionable, Müller-Westernhagen has nevertheless managed to reinvent himself every few years, and is popular with multiple generations of Germans. As a result of his singing almost exclusively in German, in a country where pop and rock are primarily performed in English, he has defined himself as an alternative to the English-language hits of the US and UK.

Müller-Westernhagen has also acted in films and in radio.

Müller-Westernhagen was quite open about his drug use and, in the 1990s, called for the legalization of all illicit drugs. Cocaine affected both him and his career from the 1970s onwards. In the beginning, he also used LSD.

== Discography ==
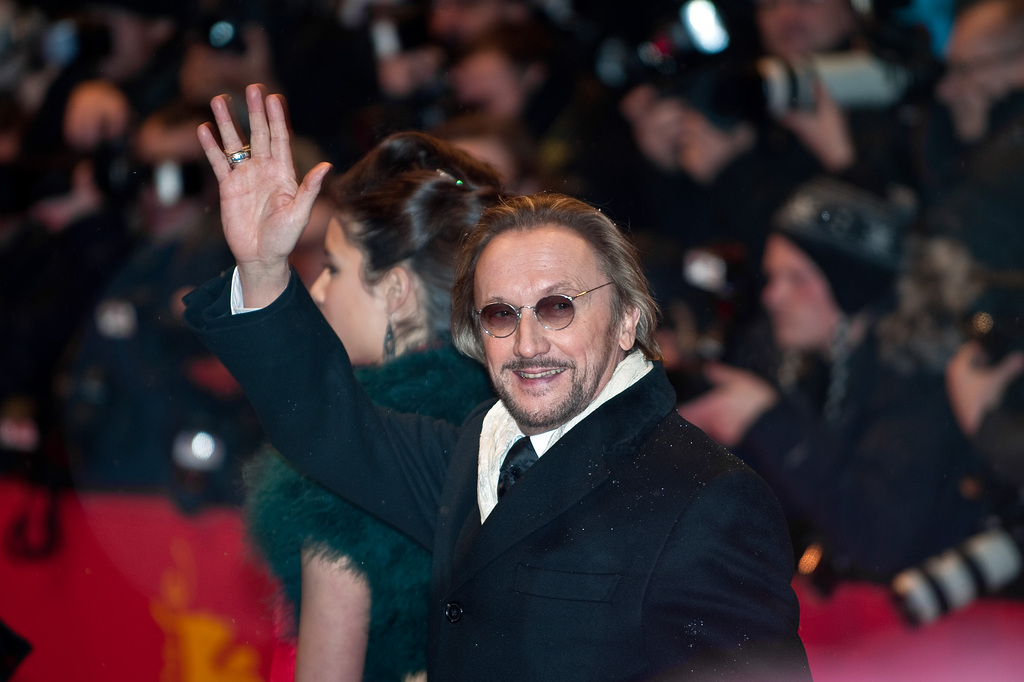
Müller-Westernhagen at the Berlin Film Festival 2010

- 1975: Das erste Mal
- 1976: Bittersüß
- 1977: Ganz allein krieg ich's nicht hin
- 1978: Mit Pfefferminz bin ich dein Prinz
- 1980: Sekt oder Selters
- 1981: Stinker
- 1982: Das Herz eines Boxers
- 1983: Geiler is' schon
- 1984: Die Sonne so rot
- 1985: Lass uns leben – 13 Balladen
- 1986: Lausige Zeiten
- 1987: Westernhagen
- 1989: Halleluja
- 1990: Live
- 1992: Jaja
- 1994: Affentheater
- 1996: Keine Zeit (Soundtrack of the motion picture Keine Zeit)
- 1998: Radio Maria
- 2000: So weit ... – Best of
- 2002: In den Wahnsinn
- 2005: Nahaufnahme
- 2009: Williamsburg
- 2011: Hottentottenmusik (Live)
- 2014: Alphatier
- 2016: MTV Unplugged
- 2019: Das Pfefferminz-Experiment
- 2022: Das eine Leben
- 2023: Westernhagen 75 - Best of
- 2024: Live Waldbühne Berlin

== Selected filmography ==
- A Lost Life (1976), as Wenzel Sigorski
- Sladek oder Die schwarze Armee (1976, TV film), as Sladek
- Tatort: Transit ins Jenseits (1976, TV series episode), as Horst Bremer
- Invitation to the Dance (1977, TV film), as Theo Gromberg
- The Second Awakening of Christa Klages (1978), as Werner Wiedemann
- Der Tote bin ich (1979, TV film), as Stefan Schröder
- Theo Against the Rest of the World (1980), as Theo Gromberg
- Mosch (1980, TV film), as Arno
- The Man on the Wall (1982), as Arnulf Kabe
- The Snowman (1985), as Dorn
- The Madonna Man (1987), as Martin Graves
- Deshima (1987), as Patrick Goessler
