= Sohrab Shahid-Saless =

Iranian filmmaker (1944–1998)

- Sohrab Shahid-Saless in 1970s
- Born: 28 June 1944; Tehran, Iran
- Died: 2 July 1998 (aged 54); Chicago, Illinois, U.S.
- Occupation: Filmmaker
- Title: Sohrab Shahid-Saless

Sohrab Shahid-Saless or Sohrab Shaheed Salles (Persian: سهراب شهید ثالث; June 28, 1944 in Tehran, Iran – July 2, 1998 in Chicago, Illinois, U.S.) was an Iranian film director and screenwriter. He was one of the most celebrated figures in Iranian cinema in the 20th century. After 1976 he worked in the cinema of Germany and was an important component of the film diaspora working in the German industry.

== Film career ==
After the revolution aftermaths in Iran and with restrictions faced by film makers and the difficulties of acquiring raw 35 mm film rolls, he made his first feature, the milestone film A Simple Event (1973), he describes the everyday life of a ten-year-old boy living in a small town with an ill mother and a father struggling to make a living smuggling fish. In contrast, Still Life (1974) explores the monotony in the life of an old railway switchman – a film that won many prizes, including one at the 1974 Berlinale. In 1975 Sohrab directed Far from Home (1975).

In 1976 on moving to Germany Sohrab released Diary of a Lover (1976), Time of Maturity (1976), and Utopia (1983). Utopia is a 186-minute film regarded by critics as a "hard ghetto film" and is the tale of a pimp and his five girls. The film was entered into the 33rd Berlin International Film Festival.

Shahid Saless is known to be a pioneer of the new wave of Iranian cinema. In his own words, his cinema intends to document the "antagonism between man and society". In the course of his oeuvre, he viewed the role of cinema as "to make conscious of indignity and inhumanity of life".

== Filmography as director ==
Tabiate bijān (Still Life) (1974) appeared at the Berlin International Film Festival

Short

- Dance of Bojnourd (Raghs-e Bojnourd) - 1969
- Resurrection (Rastākhiz) - 1969
- Siah-o sefid (Black-and-White) - 1972

Features & TV movies

- A Simple Event (Yek ettefāq-e sāde) - 1973
- Still Life (Ṭabiʿat-e bijān) - 1974
- Far from Home (Dar qorbat) - 1975
- Time of Maturity (Reifezeit) - 1976
- Diary of a Lover (Tagebuch eines Liebenden) - 1977
- The Long Vacation of Lotte H. Eisner (Die langen Ferien der Lotte H. Eisner) - 1979
- The Last Summer of Grabbe (Grabbes Letzter Sommer) - 1980
- Order (Ordnung) - 1980
- Anton P. Chekhov: A Life - 1981
- Addressee Unknown (Empfänger unbekannt) - 1983
- Utopia - 1983
- The Willow Tree (Der Weidenbaum) - 1984
- Hans: A Young Man in Germany (Hans – Ein Junge in Deutschland) - 1985
- Changeling (Wechselbalg) - 1987
- Roses for Africa (Rosen für Afrika) - 1992

== Awards and accolades ==
Sohrab Shahid-Saless won 12 professional film awards and 3 nominations during his career.

- 1972: Ob?, Best Documentary, National Tehran Film Festival.
- 1972: Black-and-white, Golden Plaque, Tehran International Children's Film Festival
- 1973; A simple event, Golden Ibex for Best Director at the International Film Festival in Tehran
- 1974: Price of the Catholic and Protestant Film Jury as part of the Young Forum at the International Film Festival Berlin
- 1974: Still Life, Silver Bear Award of the International Film Critics Prize of the Protestant jury, International Film Festival [3] In 1975 the stranger, Prize of the International Film Critics, International Film Festival Berlin
- 1976: Ripening period, Bronze Hugo, Chicago International Film Festival
- 1977: Diary of a lover Special Film Award of the British Film Institute, London Film Festival 1977, Documenta 6 in Kassel
- 1980: Order, Silver Hugo, Chicago International Film Festival, Participation in the Cannes Film Festival Week of directors.
- 1981: Grabbes Last Summer, three Grimme prices with Gold: Best Director, Best Screenplay, Best Male Actor. Best TV Movie of the Year [4], the price of the North Rhine-Westphalian Minister of Culture for Best Director.
- 1984: Utopia, Award of the Academy of Performing Arts: Best Film of the Year.
- 1991: Roses for Africa, International Film Festival Hof.

== See also ==
- Iranian cinema
