= Live 8 concert, Berlin =

Benefit concert on 2 July 2005 in Berlin, Germany

On 2 July 2005, a Live 8 concert was held at the Siegessäule (Victory Column) in the Tiergarten park in Berlin, Germany.

The event is also referred to as "Live 8 Berlin" or "Live 8 Germany".

Some music critics wrote the Berlin concert off as a failure when the original line-up was announced, complaining there were too many bands singing in German to appeal to the world. This complaint was alleviated by the late addition of Green Day to the list of artists performing.

Lauryn Hill and Crosby, Stills & Nash were originally in the lineup, but both pulled out.

== Lineup ==
=== Hosts ===
- Anne Will
- Michael Mittermeier
- Claudia Schiffer

=== Performers ===
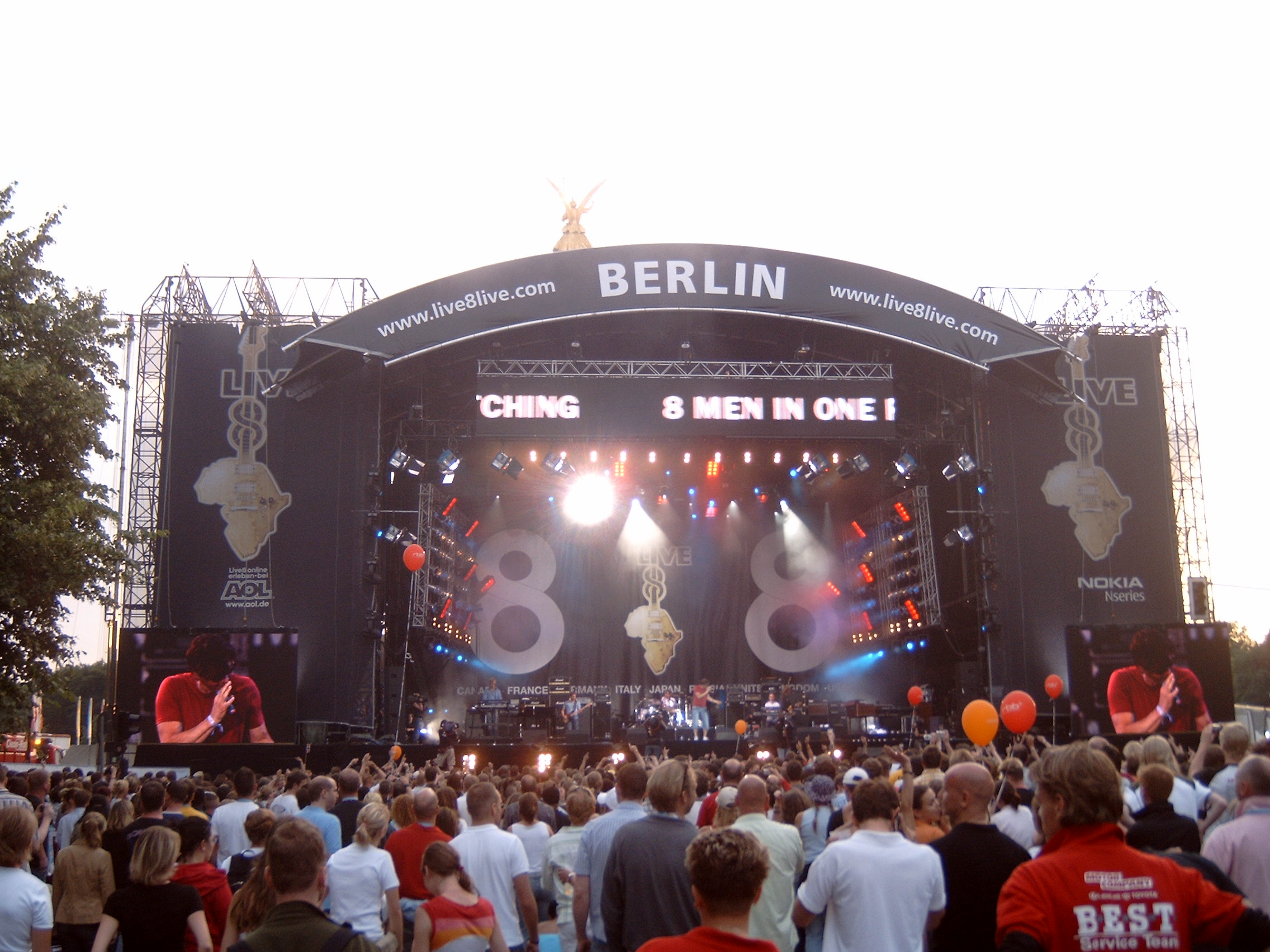
On stage A-Ha.

Past Live Aid performers are listed with an asterisk (*):

- Die Toten Hosen: "Wünsch Dir Was", "Pushed Again", "Steh Auf, Wenn Du Am Boden Bist", "Show Everyone You're Here", "Hang On Sloopy" (B 14:03)
- Wir sind Helden: "Nur Ein Wort", "Denkmal", "Bist Du Nicht Müde" (B 14:27)
- Söhne Mannheims: "Jah Is Changing All", "Babylon System" (B 14:44)
- Katherine Jenkins: "Amazing Grace" (B 15:02)
- BAP: "Wie Schön Dat Wöhr", "Verdamp Lang Her" (B 15:11)
- Audioslave: "Doesn't Remind Me", "Dedication To What Is Right", "Black Hole Sun", "Like a Stone", "Killing in the Name" (B 15:28)
- Green Day: "American Idiot", "Holiday", "Minority", "We Are the Champions" (B 15:52)
- Juli: "Geile Zeit", "Perfekte Welle" (B 16:18)
- Silbermond: "Zeit für Optimisten", "Durch die Nacht" (B 16:59)
- Chris de Burgh: "The Road To Freedom", "Lebanese Night", "The Lady In Red", "Don't Pay the Ferryman" (B 17:13)
- Brian Wilson*: "Wonderful", "Our Prayer/Gee", "Heroes and Villains", "God Only Knows", "California Girls", "Good Vibrations", "Fun Fun Fun" (B 17:34)
- Renee Olstead: "My Baby Just Cares for Me" (B 17:58)
- Sasha: "If You Believe", "Hard to Handle", "Turn It Into Something Special" (B 18:06)
- a-ha: "Take On Me", "Summer Moved On", "Hunting High And Low" (B 18:22)
- Daniel Powter: "Bad Day", "Song 6" (B 18:45)
- Joana Zimmer: "I Believe (Give A Little Bit)" (B 18:57)
- Juan Diego Flórez: "You'll Never Walk Alone" (B 19:12)
- Reamonn: "Hallelujah", "Alright" (B 19:20)
- Roxy Music: "Virginia Plain", "Love Is the Drug", "Do the Strand", "Jealous Guy" (B 19:37)
- Faithless: "Mass Destruction", "We Come 1" (B 20:01)
- Herbert Grönemeyer: "Der Mond ist aufgegangen", "Mensch", "Bleibt Alles Anders", "Flugzeuge im Bauch", "Bochum", "Heimat" (B 20:15)
- Otto: "Piano Man" (B 20:47)

Live 8 Berlin - DVD
