= A Lost Life =

1976 West German drama film

- Directed by: Ottokar Runze
- Written by: Peter Hirche
- Produced by: Ottokar Runze
- Starring: Gerhard Olschewski
- Cinematography: Michael Epp
- Edited by: Marlies Dux
- Release date: 12 March 1976
- Running time: 92 minutes
- Country: West Germany
- Language: German

A Lost Life (German: Verlorenes Leben) is a 1976 West German drama film directed by Ottokar Runze. It was entered into the 26th Berlin International Film Festival, where Gerhard Olschewski won the Silver Bear for Best Actor.

== Cast ==
- Gerhard Olschewski as Cioska
- Marius Müller-Westernhagen as Sigorski
- Gert Haucke as Kommissar Weber
