= In the Name of the People (1974 film) =

1974 West German documentary film

- Directed by: Ottokar Runze
- Written by: Ottokar Runze
- Produced by: Ottokar Runze
- Cinematography: Paul Ellmerer; Michael Epp
- Release date: 7 November 1974
- Running time: 128 minutes
- Country: West Germany
- Language: German

In the Name of the People (German: Im Namen des Volkes) is a 1974 West German documentary film directed by Ottokar Runze. It was entered into the 24th Berlin International Film Festival where it won the Silver Bear.

== Cast ==
- Gerd Siekmann as Richter (Judge)
- Heinz-Dietrich Stark as Anstaltsleiter (Head of Prison)
- Hajo Wandschneider as Rechtsanwalt (Lawyer)
