= Charles Trieschmann =

American author (1920–2015)

Charles Raymond Trieschmann (October 2, 1920 – February 23, 2015) was an American author, photographer, film producer and attorney.

== Biography ==
Born in Crossett, Arkansas, Trieschmann's parents Adam and Laura moved the family to Evanston, where he attended grade school and high school. He attended Stanford University where he was included in the 1940-41 Yearbook of Stanford Writing and graduated from the School of Social Sciences in 1942.

He later attended John Marshall Law School and qualified as an attorney.

During World War II he enlisted in the U.S. Naval Reserve and was honourably discharged as captain.

His fiction writing appeared in magazines including Collier’s and Esquire

== Photographer ==
He was a keen traveler and freelanced as a member of the Black Star photo agency. Life magazine of May 1953 included his imagery of sufferers of yaws in an essay ’Dreadful diseases: some progress is made in healing Africa’s sick’. His photograph of an amputee youth with a crutch playing football on a beach in Morocco was chosen in 1955 by Edward Steichen for the world-touring Museum of Modern Art exhibition The Family of Man, seen by 9 million visitors.

He contributed photographs to books including The World Children Live In (1957), Emerging African Nations and Their Leaders: Volume II Malawi to Zambia (1964)” Holidays and customs (1976) and Disabled village children : a guide for community health workers, rehabilitation workers, and families (1987).

== Cinema ==
Trieschmann directed and produced the 1974 American drama film Two, starring Sara Venable, which was adapted from a previously unpublished novel written by him. A book of the movie was released in the same year by Dell.

== Death ==
Living his life in the same house in which he grew up in Evanston, Trieschmann died there of brain cancer. His parents Adam and Laura and brother Ralph had pre-deceased him.
