= Passerelle =

Passerelle may refer to:

- Passerelle (Luxembourg), a bridge in the city of Luxembourg
- La Passerelle, a newspaper in Besançon, France
- Passerelle (theatre), a semicircular ramp or catwalk that extends from the stage of a theater around the orchestra pit

== See also ==
- Passerelle clause, provision included in various treaties within the European Union
- Paris bridges with "Passerelle" in their names
