= Adele in Munich =

August 2024 concert residency by Adele

- Residency by Adele
- Promotional poster for the residency
- Location: Munich Messe, Munich, Germany
- Venue: Adele Arena
- Associated album: 30
- Start date: 2 August 2024
- End date: 31 August 2024
- No. of shows: 10
- Attendance: 730,000

Adele concert chronology
- Weekends with Adele (2022–2024); Adele in Munich (2024)

Adele in Munich was the second concert residency by English singer Adele. Organised to support her 2021 album 30, the residency was held in a temporary venue on the fairgrounds within the Munich Messe (German: Messe München) complex on the outskirts of Munich, Germany, in 2024. The Weekends with Adele series was originally the only residency planned after the release of 30. However, concert promoter Klaus Leutgeb approached Adele's agent with a rudimentary idea for a performance in Germany and enlisted the help of his peer, Marek Lieberberg. Florian Wieder conceptualised the idea and designed a temporary open-air venue to provide an immersive environment for the audience.

Adele Arena, a stadium-sized concert venue with an amphitheatre layout designed to meet her needs, was exclusively intended for her performances. The stage was equipped with a 220-metre-long, 4,159.7-square-metre curved LED video screen, costing €40 million, which enabled Adele to connect more intimately with her audience. It set a Guinness World Record for the largest temporary outdoor LED video screen. The expansive stage space and 250-ton main stage equipment were installed within the largest temporary capacity ever constructed for an arena and stadium. The pyrotechnic system and the audio and lighting setups were customised according to the Adele Arena's specific characteristics. The stadium was surrounded by a vast British–German-style theme park, Adele World, featuring food and beverage offerings, amusement rides, personal memorabilia on display, and an additional stage for opening acts and Late Night Karaoke. A typical Adele set list comprised twenty songs, plus an interlude.

The concert residency spanned 10 dates, comprising two weekly performances, from 2 to 31 August 2024. Although the venue's gigantism left some journalists perplexed, the event and Adele's performance were generally well received. Adele set a new total attendance record at Munich Messe, attracting more than 730,000 people. The Munich performances recorded the highest attendance for any concert residency outside Las Vegas over 10 consecutive dates. It also set a new Billboard Boxscore attendance record for a concert engagement. According to Peter Ackermann of Neue Zürcher Zeitung, Adele earned about US$50 million. Audience spending generated more than half a billion euros for the Munich economy, and the residency increased tourism and had a positive economic impact on the region. Journalists highlighted the impact of this custom-built temporary venue on the "music business", with Adele setting "new standards for the international industry".

== Background ==
Adele's Live 2016, the tour supporting her successful third album 25, traversed multiple continents. During the tour, records for ticket sales and attendance were broken. 600,000 tickets were sold for eight concerts in Australia, and she performed to a record 200,000 people over two nights at Sydney's ANZ Stadium. On 28 June 2017, Adele expressed her uncertainty about future tours in a handwritten note in the programs for her concert series at London's Wembley Stadium. She had decided to bring her world tour to a close in her hometown. Adele set the Wembley Stadium attendance record with 98,000 people. It was "a stadium record for a UK music event", wrote BBC News. Due to issues with her vocal cords, the last two nights at Wembley Stadium were cancelled after 121 concerts performed for this album cycle.

In April 2019, a representative for Adele announced her separation from her husband, Simon Konecki. She filed a divorce petition in September of that year in Los Angeles Superior Court.

During her several-year hiatus, Adele reappeared in October 2020 by hosting the American comedy show Saturday Night Live. She made light-hearted comments about her recent weight loss and updated her fans on the status of her new album's production process. In the episode, she played a contestant in a Bachelor-themed parody sketch, singing excerpts from her songs.

Adele finalised her divorce from Konecki in March 2021. She gave her first concert in years, performing in an intimate setting at the Griffith Observatory in Los Angeles for the CBS prime-time special Adele One Night Only. Adele sang her latest single, "Easy on Me", and other songs from her impending comeback album and conversed with Oprah Winfrey.

Adele's fourth album, the first in six years, 30, was released on 19 November 2021. The album, which thematically centred on the collapse of her marriage, was created in the aftermath of her divorce and allowed her to explain this phase of her life to her son. 30 was "self-destruction", said Adele, "then self-reflection and then sort of self-redemption." She performed at the London Palladium for her ITV special An Audience with Adele before "a celebrity-heavy crowd". The album received great praise from music critics. On 30 November, she announced Weekends with Adele, a concert residency at The Colosseum at Caesars Palace in Las Vegas, scheduled to run from 21 January to 16 April 2022. 30 became the best-selling album of 2021.

Adele tearfully announced on her Instagram account on 20 January 2022 that she had postponed her entire Las Vegas residency. The sudden postponement was controversial; she justified it by citing "delivery delays and COVID" and later added that her "artistic needs" were "not being met". Weekends with Adele would eventually launch later that year.

== Development ==
Adele had been absent from Continental European concert stages since 2016 and had not planned to return. However, concert promoters Klaus Leutgeb and Marek Lieberberg would challenge her. The project originated when Leutgeb, driven by an idea but without an execution strategy, approached Lucy Dickins, Adele's agent. He put forward a series of propositions for Adele to perform on an "open-air site" in Germany, but nothing concrete came to fruition.

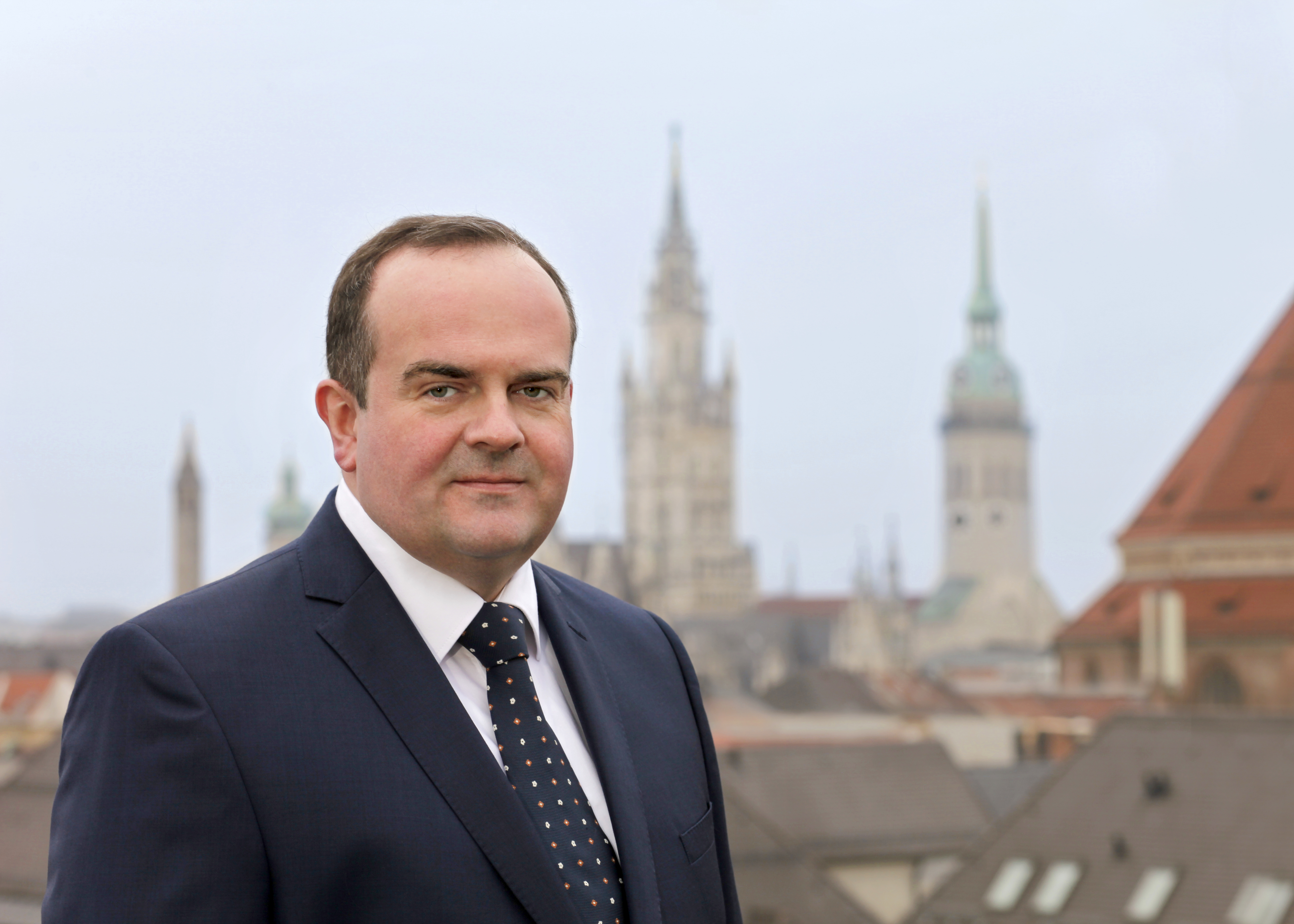
Clemens Baumgärtner (pictured) assessed the project's feasibility in Munich.

Improvements to Leutgeb's propositions were thereafter made, accompanied by the recommendation of a purpose-built stadium, illustrated by a sketch from Florian Wieder, a production designer. To determine whether the idea would be imaginable in Munich, Leutgeb and Wieder first inquired with Clemens Baumgärtner, head of the Munich Department of Labour and Economy and director of Oktoberfest. Leutgeb, of Austrian origin, sought the assistance of his "friend and mentor", Lieberberg, for "production", as well as promotion. Adele's two sold-out concerts in July 2022 at Hyde Park, London, and her Las Vegas residency were intended to be her only full live performances to promote 30.

The upgraded offer was submitted to Dickins in 2023, and she examined it. "I knew questions would be asked, like, why Germany? Why Munich?" she remembered afterwards. The Oktoberfest held in Munich was decisive, as was her evaluation of the urban infrastructure system supporting this event in a city geographically located in the heart of Central Europe. Persuaded, she presented the concept to her brother Jonathan, Adele's manager since 2006, who expressed interest in the project and would become "centrally" involved in the undertaking as with the Las Vegas residency.

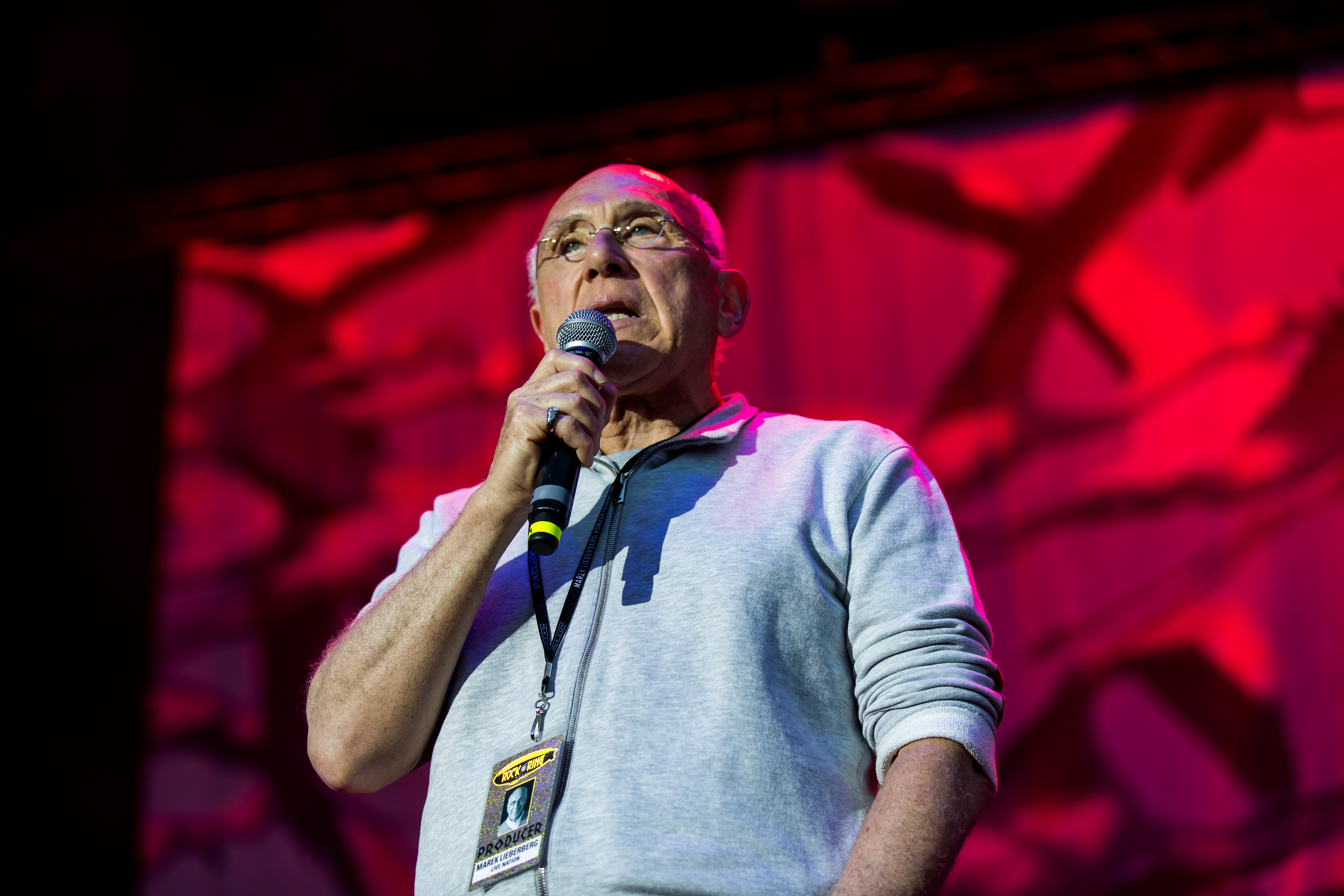
Marek Lieberberg (pictured) led negotiations for Adele to perform in Munich.

Jonathan and Lucy Dickins invited them to Los Angeles, where they met Adele. They first suggested London and Paris to her, then Munich, without insisting. Wieder valorised the infrastructure of the Messe München (lit. 'Munich Trade Fair') exhibition centre in conversation with Adele. Nevertheless, she asked him about their choice of Munich, and he argued that the city functions effectively during significant events and even in the case of high-density crowds, using Oktoberfest as an illustration. She found these arguments "madly convincing", said Wieder. Messe München, also known as "Munich Messe" to English speakers, is located on the city's outskirts. Adele accepted the offer after seeing Wieder's designs for a non-permanent stadium. Lieberberg stated that they had to "overcome a lot of hurdles and put a great deal of work into convincing her". She deemed the project "fabulous", however. Leutgeb later recalled visiting Adele in America in August 2023 and telling her, "You are the Queen of Music, we will build you your own stadium". Adele responded, "Let's do it!"

Matt Askem, Adele's creative director since 2016, worked closely with her; as a result, the project's progress accelerated in the autumn of 2023. The appraisals highlighted the project's value, which would require a significant financial investment. Live Nation then joined the project. It materialised thanks to the support of Live Nation's chief executive officer (CEO), Michael Rapino, and vice president (VP) of touring, Omar Al-joulani. A senior British music industry official said, "somebody's put a lot of money on the table. Not only have they got Adele, but they have her as a European exclusive".

Meanwhile, Baumgärtner had to carry out "enormous" trust-building work and conduct "countless conversations" at the exhibition centre for a year and a half in advance because the concerts of Andreas Gabalier, Helene Fischer, and Robbie Williams, which Leutgeb organised on the fairgrounds, received "negative feedback" during the summer of 2022. Although the concerts themselves were not subject to criticism, the suitability of Munich Messe's open space as an area for live music remained questionable due to the ground being strewn with stones of different sizes. Furthermore, renting out the grounds for concerts has not been the core business of Messe München GmbH. The planning, safety and traffic concept raised critical observations. The security environment was complicated at the German edition of Rolling Loud 2023, which also took place at Munich Messe and was organised by Live Nation GmbH and Leutgeb Entertainment Group, as aggressive individuals used these stones as projectiles. Improvements had nevertheless been made to the organisational strategy for Rolling Loud. Reinhard Pfeiffer and Stefan Rummel, CEOs of Munich Messe, only belatedly learned that the request concerned Adele.

The pivotal moment occurred shortly after Christmas 2023. The Adele project was formally adopted, and members of the Christian Social Union in Bavaria (CSU), a party on the Munich City Council, jubilantly praised their colleague Baumgärtner. Ralf Niemczyk of Rolling Stone Germany later wrote: "Various bureaucratic hurdles would have been cleared aside with a sense of proportion." Niemczyk said that this political reaction denoted a "trend in the global live business", as Adele is part of the slogan "1% artists", comprising those who are capable of generating "mega-sales" during their tours and having a considerable economic impact on the cities that host them, through concert series in the same place.

In January 2024, Jack Malvern and Oliver Moody of The Times stated that the "custom-built" venue on the vast outdoor space at the exhibition centre would be the "world's largest pop-up stadium" and would "far exceed" the 44,000-capacity temporary stadium built for the 2022 World Cup in Qatar. At this stage, Leutgeb and Lieberberg have been "courting" Adele for two years. On 31 January, the media announced that the performances at the "bespoke" Munich venue would be a concert residency, titled "Adele in Munich". Soon after, the press issued two stadium images showing several "Adele" in bright capital letters around the perimeter of the exterior façade. Journalists at Rolling Stone Germany found the stadium's layout reminiscent of a one-handed clock from an aerial perspective. This music venue was subsequently known as the "Adele Arena". Adele stated that her time in Munich would be a "wonderful" way to conclude this chapter of her life and career, with her concerts being "closer to home". Looking back on the two years spent developing the project, Leutgeb commented in February, "I had a vision that drove me forward".

Before performing in Munich, she had to complete a leg of Weekends with Adele, which ended on 15 June. Although Munich's Olympiastadion can accommodate 70,000 people, it had never been requested to host Adele concerts. Due to the Olympiastadion's ongoing renovation, which would be interrupted by construction phases, the concerts would take place only in limited time slots. A spokesperson for the Olympiapark said that ten Adele concerts in a one-month window were not feasible. Another factor that made using the Olympiastadion unlikely was the exclusive contract held by Leutgeb's Global Event and Entertainment GmbH, which gave it priority for organising concerts on the Munich Messe fairgrounds. According to a spokesperson for the Messe München GmbH, it was valid for July and August.

A press conference was held on 16 July 2024 in Hall C6 of Munich Messe, during which the media received information and visuals about the venue's layout. Adele was not present. Leutgeb told the media that the project idea had germinated two and a half years earlier while sitting next to Wieder in Munich. Jonathan Dickins stated it would be "the total opposite of the very small shows in Las Vegas". The media event unveiled "Adele World", a "catering", amusement rides and shopping area built surrounding the stadium. Lieberberg described Adele in Munich as "the most extensive project in my 50 years in the music business". Past concert experiences on the fairgrounds, discussed at the press conference, prompted Felicitas Lachmayr of Augsburger Allgemeine to say, "And now?"

Robert Levine of Billboard reported that production had cost more than US$100 million, including construction costs, whereas other publications provided different figures. Consequence's Scoop Harrison wrote that the cost was $130 million; Le Figaro's Salomé Hénon-Cohin said it amounted to €140M (equivalent to $151.5M in mid-2024). Leutgeb Entertainment Group partnered with Lieberberg's Live Nation Germany to promote the concert residency. Adele had no further appearances planned in Europe except for her performances in Munich; therefore, she stayed in Germany in July before beginning her summer concert series. Adele resided in Munich with her son until the end of August, a context that suited her, renting a 451 square metres (4,850 sq ft) floor of the luxury Rosewood Munich, the former Bavarian State Bank, for €30,000 (equivalent to $33,000 in mid-2024) per night.

After Adele's first Messe stage appearance, Lieberberg said, "The whole planning has been going on for over a year now", and "4,000 people have worked with us" on the project. Having brought the original idea to fruition, Lieberberg called the enterprise "Adelepolis", which he said had been made up of meetings, determination, exploration, and inspiration.

== Conception and creation ==
Wieder developed the "visual concept". He designed Adele Arena and Adele World. When he met Adele in Los Angeles, her contributions to the project became increasingly personal; she proposed a replica of her preferred pub and a British telephone box for photo opportunities. Adele and Wieder knew each other because he had staged her performance at the MTV Awards in her early days. Wieder's remembered this televised performance, in which Adele sang near a piano, dressed in black, in a sober rendering. He knew that "she loves it 'High-End'". He also cited Adele's affection for her residency at The Colosseum at Caesars Palace, as well as its performance space layout. Michael Zirnstein of Süddeutsche Zeitung wrote that Wieder designed "a stadium in this 'vibe', only more monumental". Wieder emphasised the importance of not overloading the design, making it "deliberately restrained" and prioritising black colour to aim at the "same elegance" that defines Adele's visual identity. Unlike Wieder's other works, the stadium design was entirely customised to meet the "needs of a single artist". "That's a statement!" Wieder said. The entire venue he designed was open-air for audiences, with Adele's primary concern was that the construction should be in an amphitheatre style. The Adele Arena's layout included both seated grandstands and standing areas. Wieder consulted with Adele, Jonathan and Lucy Dickins for Adele World's design. Social media impact was partially considered when designing Adele World, and thus, elements that resonated with fans' photography interests were included. Two shiny capital "A" letters were created to be placed at the entrances to the Adele Arena.

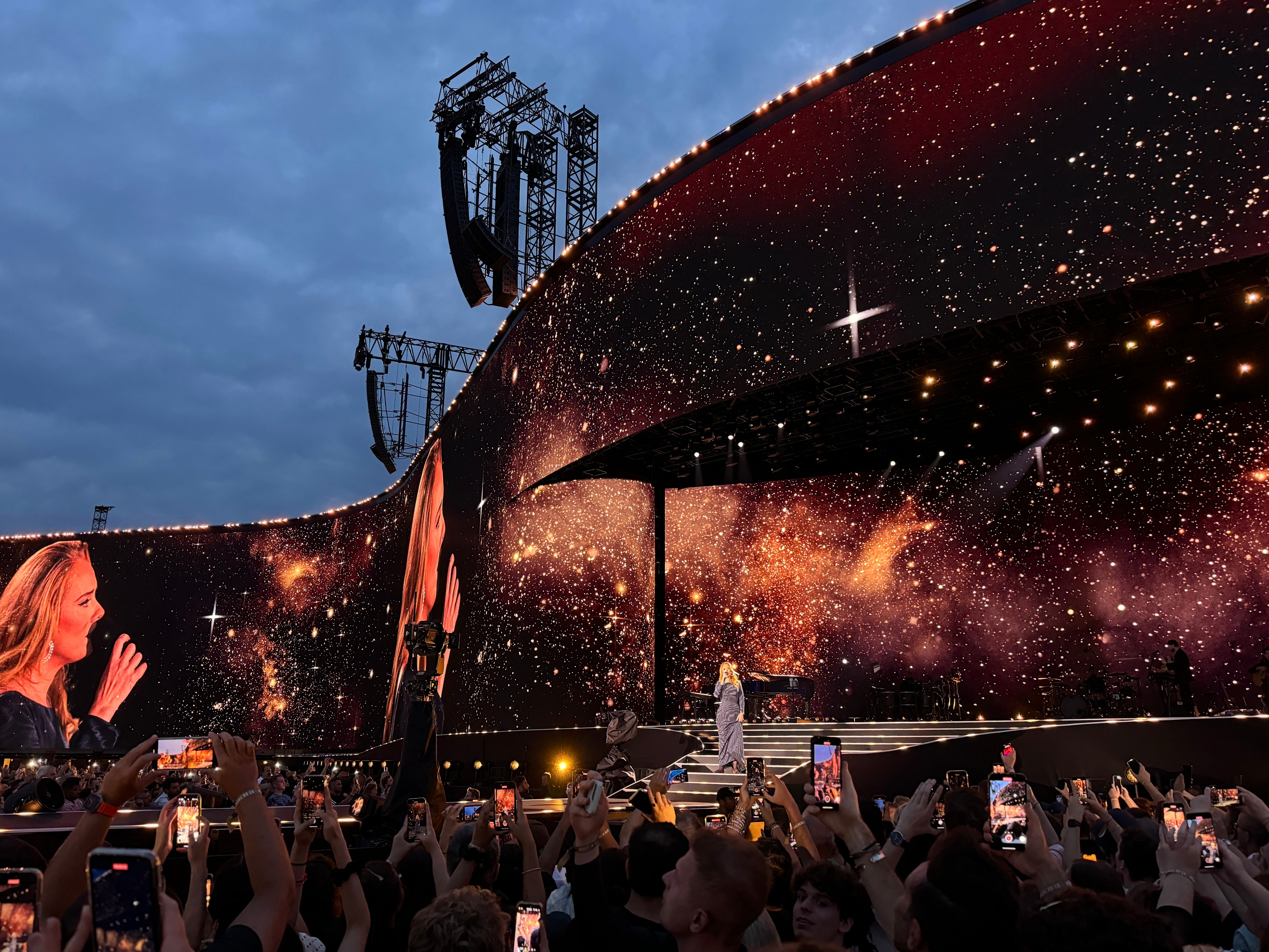
The LED video screen's curves helped achieve the desired embrace-like effect.

Stufish Entertainment Architects, Adele's long-standing collaborative firm, was commissioned to design the stage in the autumn of 2023. (Note: Stufish, a British firm co-founded by Mark Fisher, worked on, among others, Weekends with Adele and her "I Drink Wine" performance at the 2022 Brit Awards.) Stufish developed the stage and LED video screen concepts. Ray Winkler, Stufish CEO and design director, and his team, met briefly with Adele on 23 October 2023, when "lots of sketches and lots of ideas were circulating". When discussing the screen's design, the Stufish team anchored the concept of a "big scroll", with Winkler advocating vigorously that it embody the idea of "the embrace", applied both "metaphorically" and "practically".

Solotech, (Note: Solotech, founded in the late 1970s in Montreal, won its first contract to manage the audio system for the 1976 Olympic Games. In 2022, Solotech provided the audiovisual for the British Summer Time (BST) festival at London's Hyde Park, where they met Adele and her team. Soon after the 2,000-employee company was hired to work on Weekends with Adele in Las Vegas, said Ian Woodall, director of special projects at Solotech.) a Quebec-based company Adele chose to manage the video technology for her Las Vegas residency, was involved in the Munich project. Brompton Technology, a manufacturer of LED processors, worked closely with Solotech on the video screen project from origination to subsequent on-site installation. The LED video screen consisted of panels fabricated by ROE Visual. These ROE Visual Carbon 5 MarkII panels were configured in a concave and convex manner. The Carbon 5's contextually beneficial features were its lightweight design, efficient heat dissipation, and 6,000-nit brightness. The video screen left China to arrive at Twenty Three, a Belgian company specialising in LED framing, which manufactured the screens' surrounds. Solotech acted as the "official" video screen supplier. The screen was powered by Brompton's LED video processing technology, 26 Tessera SX40, and over 100 Tessera XD 10G data distribution units. The LED screen comprised 6,200 ROE video tiles, each calibrated using Hydra, Brompton's measurement system. (Note: The setup fully benefited from features such as Extended Bit Depth and PureTone. Brompton Technology stated that it ensured uniform video content during concerts, even in the context of extremes of brightness and colour gamut. Ian Woodall, director of global touring and special projects at Solotech, said they also used Tessera's features named API, Cable Redundancy, Frame Store, sACN for brightness control and Brompton's scaler.) Each tile forming the video screen surface had dimensions of 600 mm by 1,200 mm. The screen, its structure, and custom bracketry required an intricate engineering process to achieve the desired curve. One of the substantial challenges the team encountered was to create seamless curves over a vast distance and at great height, with the added concern that the screen would be visible to everyone during daylight and bright sunlight. Brompton's Adam Callaway said Adele's Las Vegas residency served as the basis for "rigorous testing and validating workflows" in conjunction with testing in the United Kingdom. The cost of creating the LED video screen was €40 million (equivalent to $44,160,000 in mid-2024). Winkler later stated that its creation was not an intentional quest for the world's largest. The goal differed because the screen's "curvaceous form" enabled Adele to obtain the "embrace" aspect and the proximity she wanted with her audience. Deborah Cole of The Guardian later described the video screen as resembling "a very long roll of analogue film", with its wavy design ensuring optimal visibility for people in the stadium's back rows.

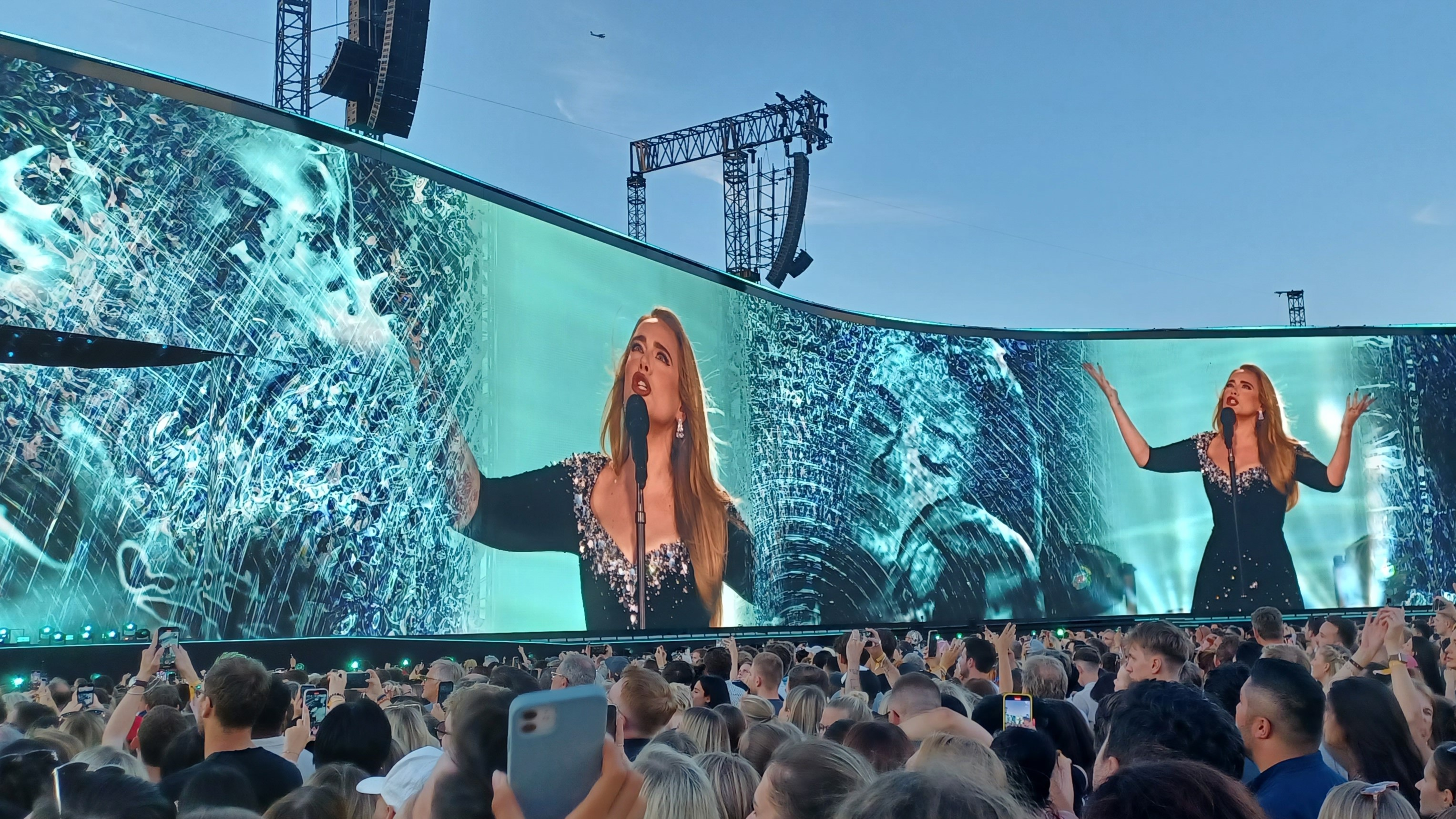
Live footage combined with visual effects displayed on the video screen

Cohesion between several industry companies involved was necessary, firstly with Solotech, to engineer a hanging bracket capable of supporting 250 tons of video panels, lighting units, and rigging.

Askem led the creation of all video footage displayed on the LED video screen, which was specifically conceived for the Munich residency, and Treatment Studio then handled its production. This was the largest screen he had worked with; "It's big so that you feel that sense of intimacy", he commented. Askem found it challenging to combine pre-shot segments, the "general imagery", with live footage appearing on the screen's "continuous surface". In contrast, both visual renderings are transposed onto several smaller screens in other shows. Still, the video screen made "a great canvas to play on", he said. Adele advocated that four songs not be filmed live, an option Askem had not previously considered. He devised different scenarios to capture the desired visuals, filming Adele on six distinct days in Los Angeles. One specific scenario involved her performing in a studio under numerous rain curtains and on grated floors. The visuals for "Love in the Dark", "Send My Love", "Skyfall" and "Water Under the Bridge" included content from these video shoots. Treatment Studio provided archival footage from Adele's personal life for the video content, and Noah Campeau oversaw the creative direction.

Nicolai Sabottka, managing director of FFP Spezialeffekte und Veranstaltungslogistik (lit. 'Special Effects and Event Logistics'), a special effects company chosen for the pyrotechnics, recognised that their flames within the Adele Arena "would look as piffling as a box of indoor fireworks". To match the venue's dimensions, the company created a new flame system producing flames reaching 35 metres (115 ft) in height.

Cory FitzGerald and Raphael Demonthy were the lighting designers for the concerts and Adele World, respectively. FitzGerald said that providing adequate lighting coverage across the expansive stage space was a "primary challenge" as he contemplated creating the appropriate ambience. Adele's placements onstage could not be known in advance, which concerned him. The lighting team approached the overall look of the stage composition by seeking "to connect with the same type of audience intimacy" as in Las Vegas, despite a different context in terms of the extent and number of participants.

Audio system engineer Johnny Keirle, responsible for the audio setup throughout Weekends with Adele, was assigned to the German residency. From "an audio perspective", according to Keirle, everything was "tailored specifically" to the German residency while "targeting unique design criteria that were specific to both the venue and the creative/performance requirements". He designed the delay systems with the intention of each being powered by a single amplifier positioned under the delay platform to achieve a "clean and tidy footprint". Keirle studied in detail trends in Munich's atmospheric conditions and modelled "extreme potential" weather variations using the Soundvision and Network Manager programs to prepare for and electronically manage any meteorological disturbances on-site. The audio team and Britannia Row [Productions] collaborated to "custom-engineer and manufacture wind bracing solutions" to limit wind-induced stress on each "PA hang" in the venue. The creative team requested work on the audio system around the LED screen trim, which posed a significant technical challenge due to its height of over 21 metres (69 ft) above the ground, consequently necessitating an unconventional design.

== Planning and ticketing ==
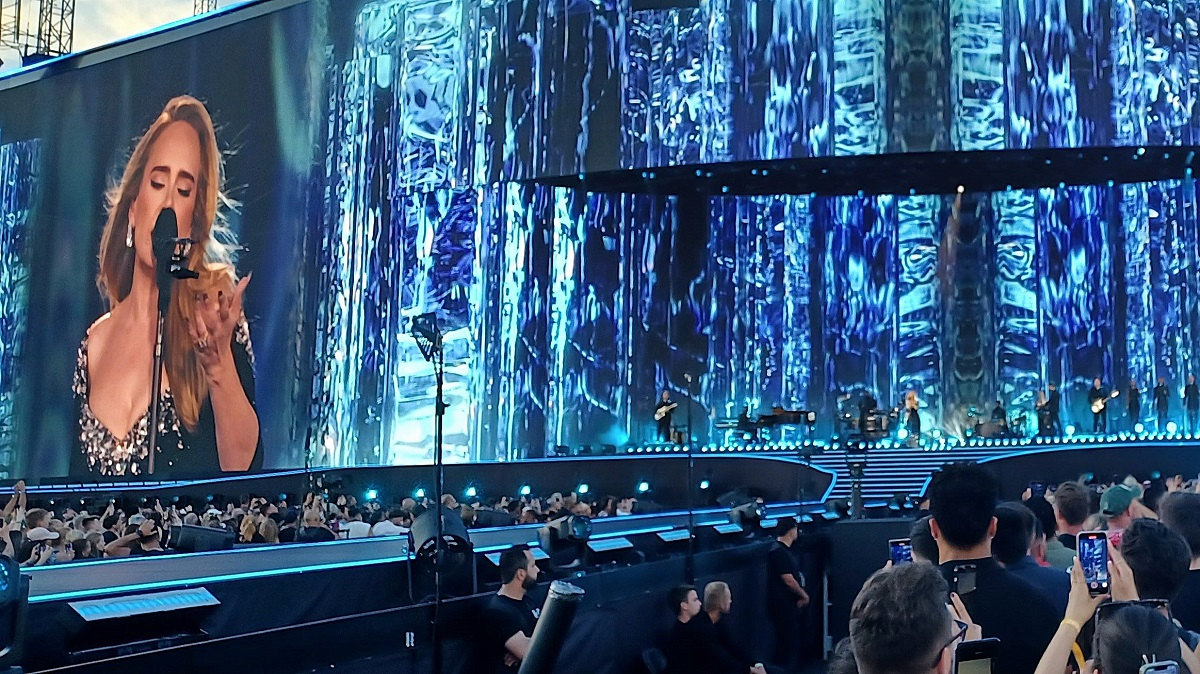
Stage as viewed from the standing area in zone 1, Fos 2 rechts (right) ticket

On 31 January 2024, Adele was announced to perform four shows on 2, 3, 9, and 10 August. She added four shows on 2 February, scheduled for 14, 16, 23, and 24 August. Registrations for a presale were possible on the Adele website until 5 February. At this point, 2.2 million people had registered on her website for ticket presales. On 6 February, due to "unprecedented demand", two final dates, 30 and 31 August, were added to the run of shows. The 10-night concert residency was scheduled to take place twice weekly throughout August 2024.

Presales began on 7 February on Ticketmaster and were staggered in different phases. The general sale began via Live Nation and Eventim on 9 February. Ticket prices were only revealed during the sale; no price range had been provided beforehand. People were faced with standard tickets ranging in price from €74.90 to €689 (equivalent to $83 and $760 in mid-2024). VIP packages ranged in price from €488 to €1,252 (equivalent to $543 and $1,392 in mid-2024). The cheapest price categories sold out instantly. Ninety-five percent of tickets had been sold by mid-July. Then, Ticketmaster sold a limited number of Lucky Dip tickets for €35 (equivalent to $39 in mid-2024) every Monday morning, but buyers did not know their seats until they arrived at the stadium. Tickets were usually sold out within half an hour. The "bargain-basement prices" were deemed "unfair" by some devotees, given the amounts they had paid at the beginning of the sale, a practice previously employed by the Rolling Stones.

== Construction and production ==
Paul English, Adele's veteran production manager, began investing himself in the project in January 2024.

Sebastian Pichel, the Adele Arena production manager, said two electrical transformer booths in this outdoor area of the exhibition centre caused problems due to their placement and could not be technically dismantled. Pichel then decided to rotate the stadium 180° before commencing its construction. Other existing transformer stations, light poles, and loudspeakers were dismantled. A specialist used a detection dog to search for possible unexploded ordnance (UXO), as a former airport located in the area had been bombed during wartime. The discovery of UXO would interrupt ongoing work.

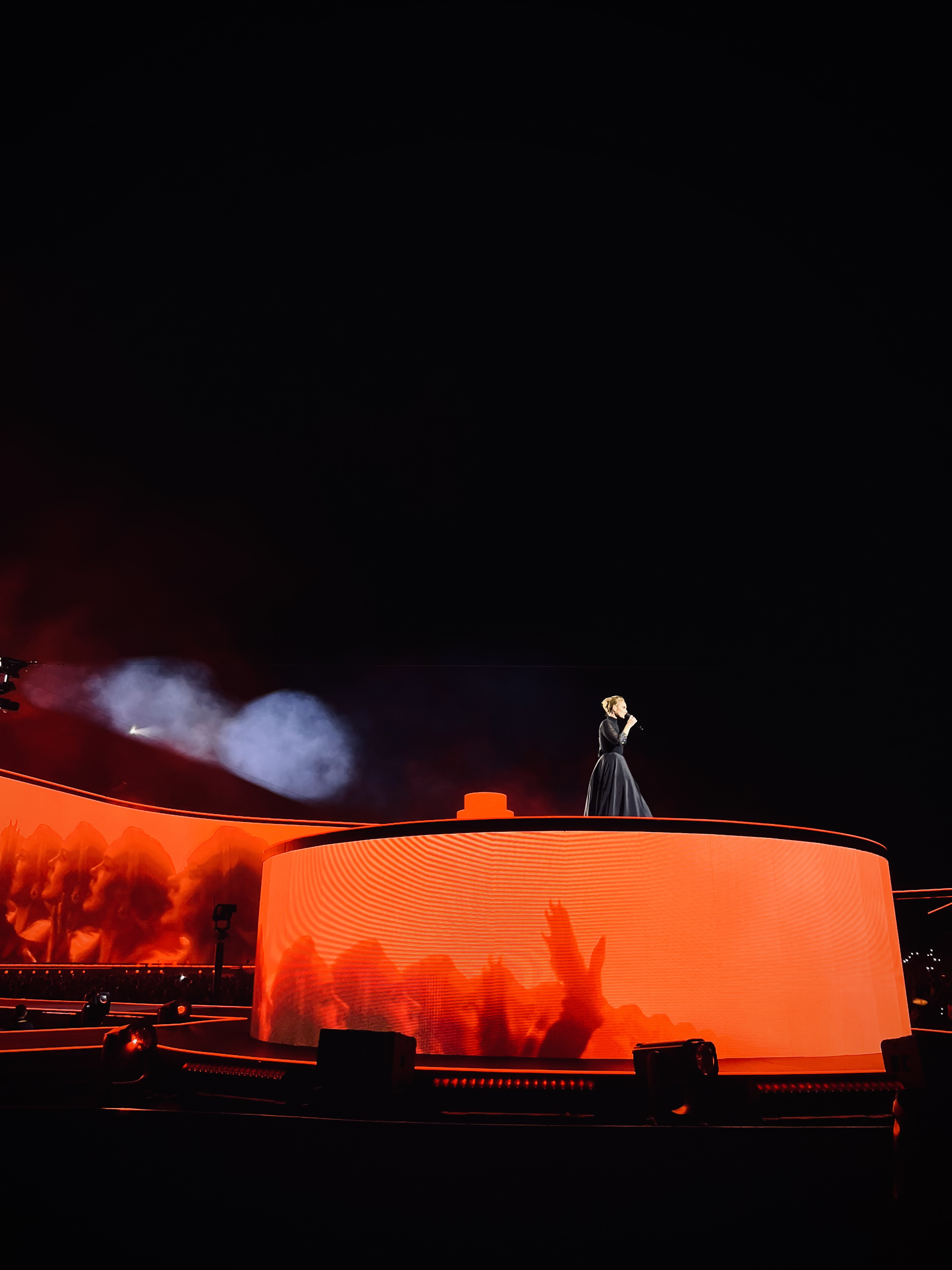
A deep excavation was created to accommodate the B-stage.

Construction work commenced in May, would last twelve weeks, and employed a team of 1,000 workers. The initial phase involved deep excavation to install a specific stage element. Malcolm Birkett, technical designer and Weekends with Adele team member, described that the vast hole dug was intended for "the lifts", where the B-stage would be situated. The B-stage hole was dug to a depth of 4 metres (13 ft) and was then "tanked". A network of tunnels was also created. The space already had an existing infrastructure network, including electric power, optical fibre, water supply, and waste pipes. The organisers poured 75,000 square metres (810,000 sq ft) of water-permeable asphalt in front of where the stage would be positioned to ensure spectators' comfort in the event of rain.

English stated that a fleet of 500 to 600 trucks had been required, and the team began loading materials in June. The transportation of the seating system was handled by 250 trucks, while fewer than 100 trucks were utilised for production equipment. He said the staging involved 60 trucks containing black-coloured steel, and the load-in was possible with 350 crew members and 200 on concert days. Other structures and components required were 3 kilometres (1.9 mi) of trussing and 1.3 kilometres (0.81 mi) of LED stage lighting. Rigging and lighting supplier Neg Earth sent 412 motors with varying lifting capacities and 52,000-metre (171,000 ft) long cables to the site. English arrived on site on 28 June.

The LED video screen was transported to Messe for connection to the black steel. Stageco arrived on 1 July and began construction, including the black steel substructure. Live Nation and Leutgeb Entertainment Group were responsible for the Aufbau (lit. 'construction'). The stage's construction process commenced at the beginning of July, involving a team of 700 people. Five hundred seventy individual truss sections were put together.

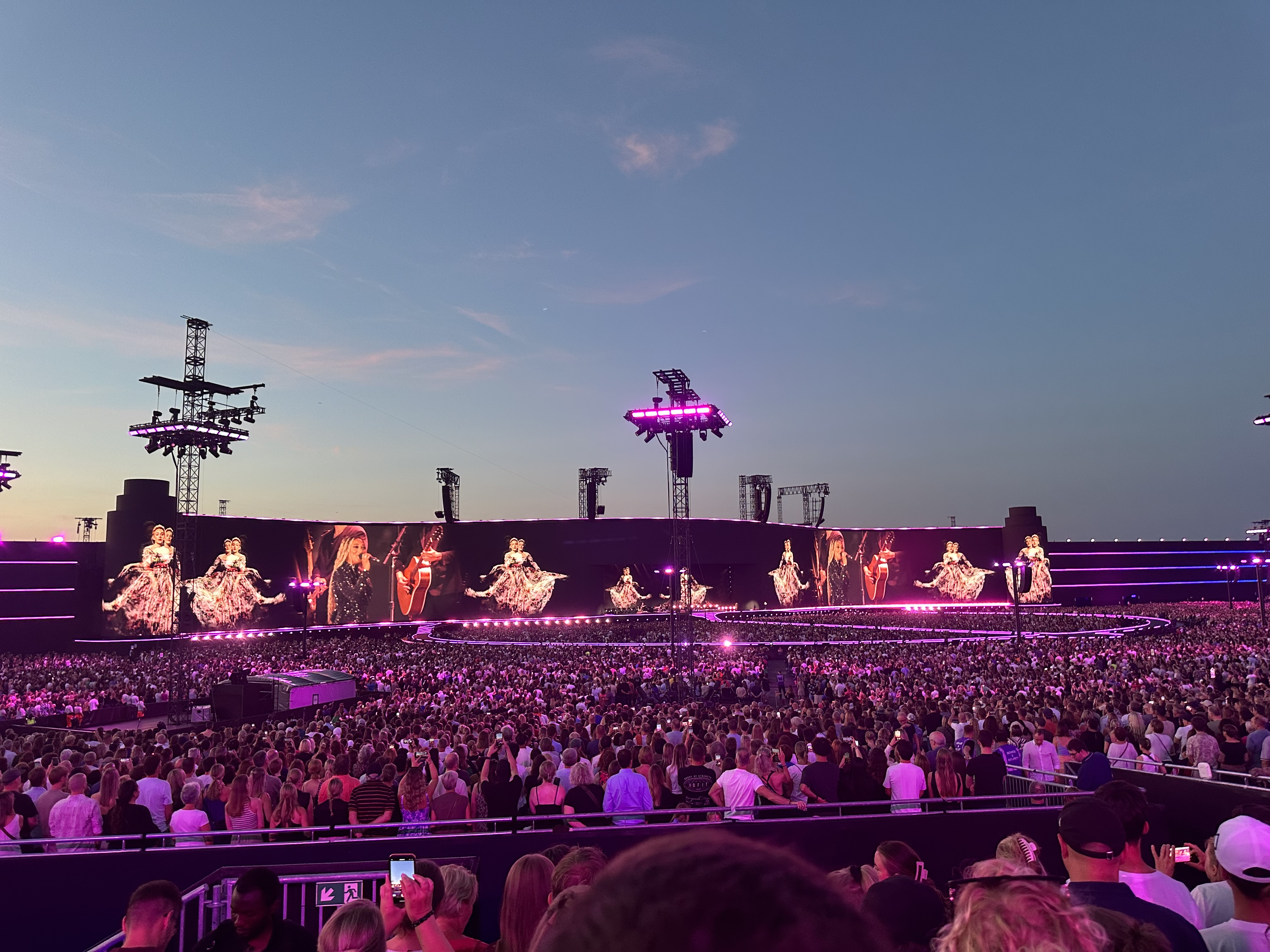
Adele Arena's stage production, viewed from the lower level of the grandstands

The video screen was integrated into the 4,000 square metres (43,000 sq ft) stage structure. Callaway said Brompton Technology partnered with Solotech on-site for three days to ensure trouble-free implementation of the task sequences required for the 4K Tessera SX40 LED processors. The dimensions of the LED video screen were initially announced as 220 metres (722 ft) wide and 30 metres (98 ft 5 in) high. Its height, however, subsequently varied. Katrin Nussmayr of Die Presse wrote that the screen was 220 by 17 metres (722 ft × 56 ft). In a technical retrospective with team members, David Barbour of Lighting & Sound America gave its dimensions as 220 by 19 metres (722 ft × 62 ft). The publications consistently specified a video screen width of 220 metres. The stage was directly next to the autobahn [A 94] (highway), but it guaranteed complete noise isolation by creating a physical barrier.

Adele expressed her enthusiasm when she visited the stadium construction site in mid-July, posting on her Instagram account, "It's all a bit bloody exciting", as significant progress was made in assembling the stage. After an initial visit to the construction site, as part of the press conference, Lachmayr wrote, "The dimensions of the project are gigantic". Jonathan Dickins said Adele "has brought a lot of ideas, the site carries her DNA" and emphasised that one of her most important concerns would be creating a "'cosy' atmosphere". Given the sizeable daily attendance expected, Lachmayr thought this was not easy to conceive. Keirle said the stadium's deepest and widest points were 200 metres (656 ft) deep and 400 metres (1,312 ft) wide, encompassing an area of 60,000 square metres (650,000 sq ft). The last rows of the grandstands did not rise excessively vertically but formed a gentle slope, all arranged in a semicircle that echoed an "ancient theatre".

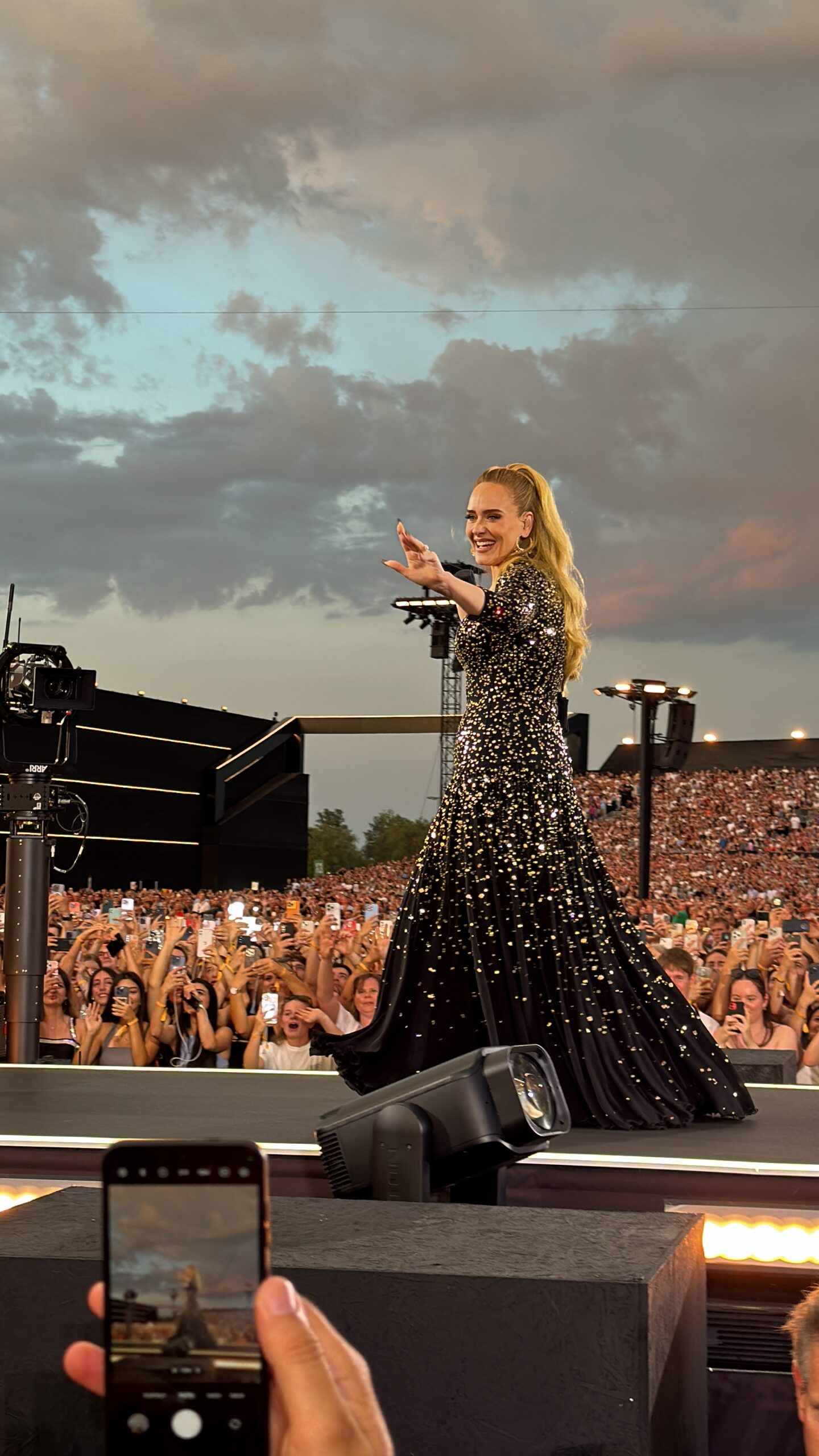
Adele on the catwalk, moving from the B-stage to the main stage

The main stage was coupled to a 93-metre (305 ft) "catwalk" and a 200-metre (660 ft) semicircle stage (a "walkway"), which led to the B-stage, helping Adele to get closer to the audience. Illuminated and situated at the intersection of the catwalk and the "passerelle" (walkway), the B-stage enabled Adele to be lifted into the air in the middle of the stadium. The passerelle encircled attendees standing, and while performing on the B-stage, she fronted rows of seats. The layout facilitated Adele's transfer to the B-stage to sing and then walk along the circular passerelle before returning to the main stage within her usual environment with her musicians. Although the Adele Arena was larger than The Colosseum at Caesars Palace, the dimensions within the proscenium were identical.

A pyrotechnics system supplied by FFP Spezialeffekte was incorporated into the circular passerelle. English later said, "We had more pyro than Rammstein." The passerelle was equipped with Evolution Pyrotechnics 1S25 silver jets, necessitating a consumption of 540 units for each concert. Other categories used at each performance included 1,000 Evolution Pyrotechnics comets, mines, multishots, aerial shells for the "grand finale", and a range of special effects. Each concert involved the use of approximately one ton of confetti.

A Robe iForte LTX, a "key lighting unit", was installed on the floor surrounding the main stage. LTX lighting fixtures were installed in the towers, serving as followspots, and the Zactrack automated tracking system would supplement them if additional crucial lights were required, depending on Adele's onstage locations. The rehearsals determined Adele's placement onstage. An "effective" followspot system was implemented to provide coverage for the 14,400 square metres (155,000 sq ft) performance zone, and "precision and accuracy" were required to position the spot towers 128 metres (420 ft) from the stage. The onstage units were composed of Dominoes. All other lighting fixtures on the floor in front of the stage and within the Adele Arena were LTX units. FitzGerald said the lighting production was fully IP-rated, as the outdoor environment presented challenges due to unpredictable weather conditions.

To achieve the desired sound quality, Keirle requested more audio delay towers for Munich, exceeding the number typically deployed for a comparably sized setup. Fourteen delay towers were deployed in the stadium, including eight traditional large delay towers and six custom-made mini "lamppost" towers. All were equipped with L-Acoustics speakers, which he said were of the "finest" quality the brand could provide. Each of the fourteen positions featured two L-Acoustics elements, one L2 and one L2D, while the eight traditional delay towers were equipped with three additional KS21 subwoofers. Behind the L2 were the eight KS21 suspension systems, arranged in a cardioid configuration to "increase low-frequency resource" and provide "improved directivity control". These audio delay towers did not obstruct the LED screen. Keirle said that the discreet design of the custom mini-lamppost delay towers was necessary to maintain a correct line of sight, resulting in minimal seat loss. The main L-Acoustics K1SB and K1 loudspeakers were suspended above the LED video screen and positioned separately from the adjacent K2 down-hangs. The audio team implemented a traditional left–right—dual mono system, which differed from the immersive [L-Acoustics] L-ISA system used in Las Vegas. Clair Global provided sound gear and positioned a control package similar to the Las Vegas configuration.

The stadium, grandstands, sidewalls and technical crew production reached completion by 21 July, making them "show-ready". Lieberberg highlighted the stadium's appearance, which was entirely black and devoid of any advertising, adding, "just with Adele signage". The Adele Arena was divided into eleven zones, totalling eighty-five blocks, and had a 600-metre (2,000 ft) long backstage area. The site had three main entrances, facilitating seamless arrivals and departures. The event area, equivalent to 60 football pitches, covered 400,000 square metres (4,300,000 sq ft).

Jan Stremmel of Süddeutsche Zeitung described the Adele Arena as "a temporary stadium, larger than almost any other in Germany". Billboard's Gil Kaufman wrote that it was "the largest temporary arena ever built". Guinness World Records verified the video screen's dimensions on 23 August 2024, with their data indicating an area of 4,159.7 square metres (44,775 sq ft). Joanne Brent, the book's official adjudicator, certified it as "the Largest Continuous Outdoor LED Screen (temporary) ever built".

== Adele World ==
Adele World, spanning 70,000 square metres (750,000 sq ft), functioned as a "gastronomy city" and an "experience area" with 13,000 to 14,000 seats. The outdoor environment featured a Ferris wheel, alongside a historic swing carousel, the Hornig's Schwanenflieger, which has been spinning since 1949. Lieberberg said Adele World was "one of the three supporting pillars" of the event, alongside the Adele Arena and the concert itself. Its doors opened at 3:30 pm and closed at midnight, thereby allowing attendees to visit before and after the concerts, with the intention of offering an "immersive experience". Adele World included an additional stage for opening acts, on which Baumgärtner delivered a brief speech at the opening of the residency, referring to the "Adele-Wiesn"; Oktoberfest being called "Wiesn" by locals. He was preceded by a four-horse coach loaded with wooden barrels, which stopped with a loud jingle of bells.

Adele was involved in selecting the food and beverage offerings. Foreign participants were able to discover Bavarian cuisine in a beer garden area, with the exception of standard fast-food items, which were unavailable. The food choices consisted of truffle pasta tossed in Parmesan wheels, shrimp baguettes, fried tortellini, crêpes, American flank steaks, "dynamite shrimps", French fries with curry sausage (Currywurst), cheese Spätzle (Käsespätzle), pinse, and veggie snacks. Sabine Buchwald of Süddeutsche Zeitung wrote that "the selection and quality" of food were quite satisfactory for an event of this "order of magnitude". The German confectionery manufacturer Haribo created Adele's own custom packs of gummies, which were sold on-site and bore the inscriptions "For Someone Like You" and "Haribo Loves Adele".

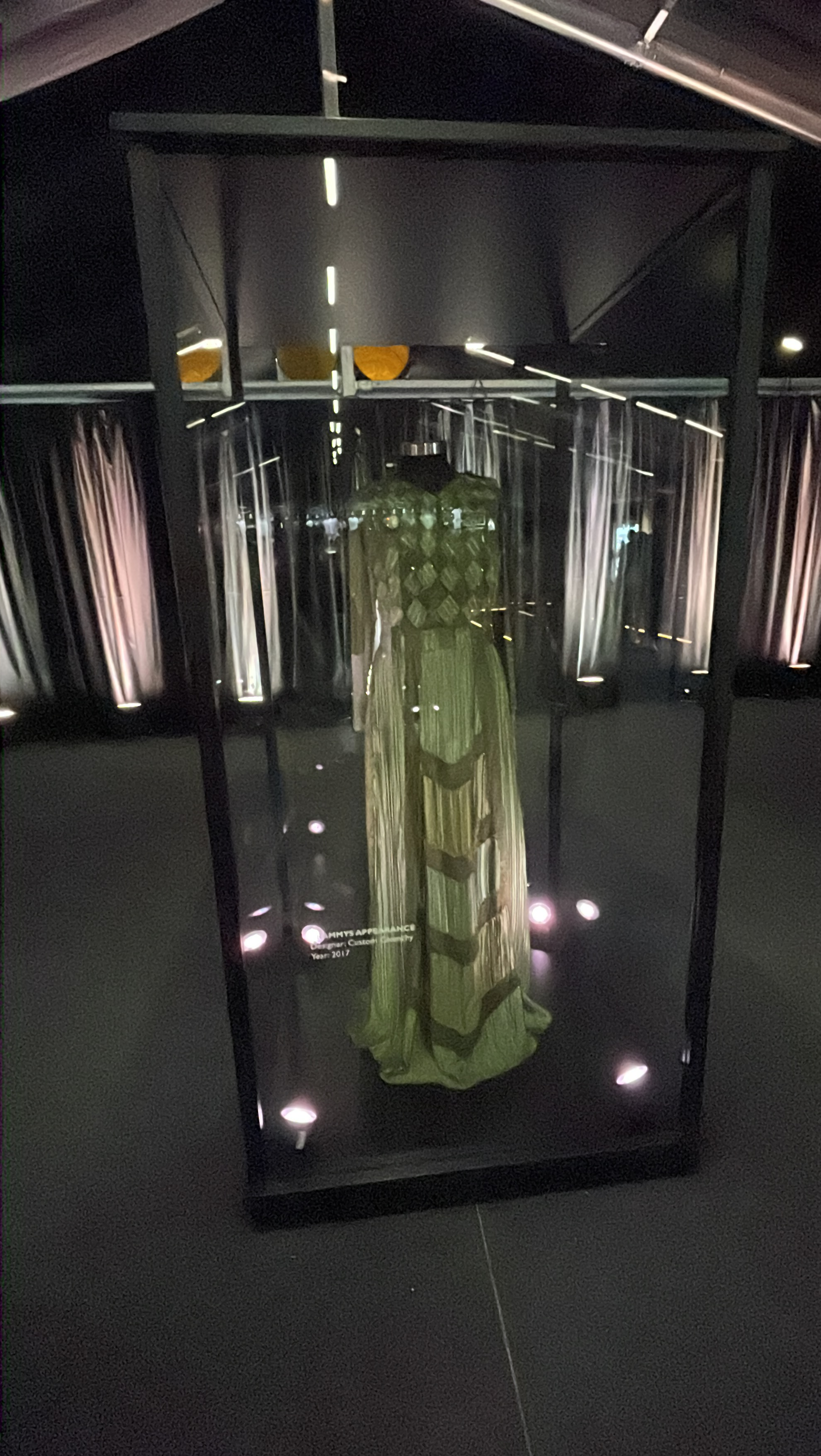
Green Givenchy haute couture gown worn by Adele at the 2017 Grammy Awards, on display at Adele World

Adele World housed a reproduction of a British pub. The English press initially indicated it would be a replica of The Good Ship pub in Kilburn, London, where some of her early live performances took place. Despite what was reported in the press, the replica of this pub was not found on opening day. Instead, it was a replica of the Duke of Wellington pub in West London, where Adele signed her first recording contract. At the I Drink Wine bar, people could consume white wines, among a range of options. Aperol spritz, one of Adele's "favourite drinks", was abundantly served. The beverage selection also encompassed beer, German Radler, wine spritzer (Weinschorle), Champagne, and Müller-Thurgau semi-sparkling non-alcoholic wine. Münchner Merkur's Katja Kraft described the presentation of Adele World as being of "high quality". Every detail was adapted to Adele's songs, including the employees' polo shirts emblazoned with the "Hello. How can I help?" logo.

Among the memorabilia on display was a telephone box similar to the one featured in the "Hello" music video; it was covered with ivy and emitted messages from Adele. Nussmayr likened Adele World to a German Volksfest, noting its incorporation of quintessentially British elements such as the [red] telephone box for selfies. Artificial turf areas have also been installed for relaxation. Buchwald also drew a comparison to a Volksfest, but one characterised by an elegant design with an abundance of black. Performers walked through Adele World on stilts, and a brass band played. A queue of approximately 200 metres (660 ft) long formed to access the main merchandise tent. After an hour's wait to enter this merchandise store, the crowd was able to admire the outfits Adele had worn at special events, including a dozen gowns—among them a Burberry piece and a green one by Givenchy—all displayed in locked glass cases.

The stage featured a Spice Girls tribute ensemble, called the Spice Girls Experience, followed by a karaoke session as a warm-up before Adele's concert. DJ Mad then began his set at 6:15 pm. Performances by German magician Florian Zimmer also preceded Adele's ten concerts. After each concert, the Late Night Karaoke began, during which participants were encouraged to perform covers of "classic pop songs". Maggie Rogers unexpectedly appeared on the karaoke stage on 16 August.

A 3 by 2.5 metres (9.8 ft × 8.2 ft) portrait of Adele was painted in Adele World by a trio of German graffiti artists: Markus Henning, Melander Holzapfel, and Nils Jänisch. After initially noticing the empty wall of a storage container during the final inspection before the first concert, Adele's management commissioned Henning to embellish it. The essential elements of the theme to be painted on the wall were predetermined: a portrait of Adele smiling on a black background, with planets and the phrase "Guten Tag, Babes!" (lit. 'Good afternoon, babes!'). Attendees queued up to have their photograph taken in front of the wall, "a real selfie spot" and a common practice at every concert date. (Note: The painting required additional touch-ups due to the proximity of people.) Television and newspapers reported on the painting of the façade. René Hofmann of Süddeutsche Zeitung, as well as Levine, described Adele World as a "theme park".

The hospitality area for VIP ticket holders, located in Hall C6 of Messe, offered up to 1,000 guests the culinary services of three-star German chef Christian Jürgens.

== Synopsis ==
Adele performed at the Adele Arena.

== The Saturn Times ==
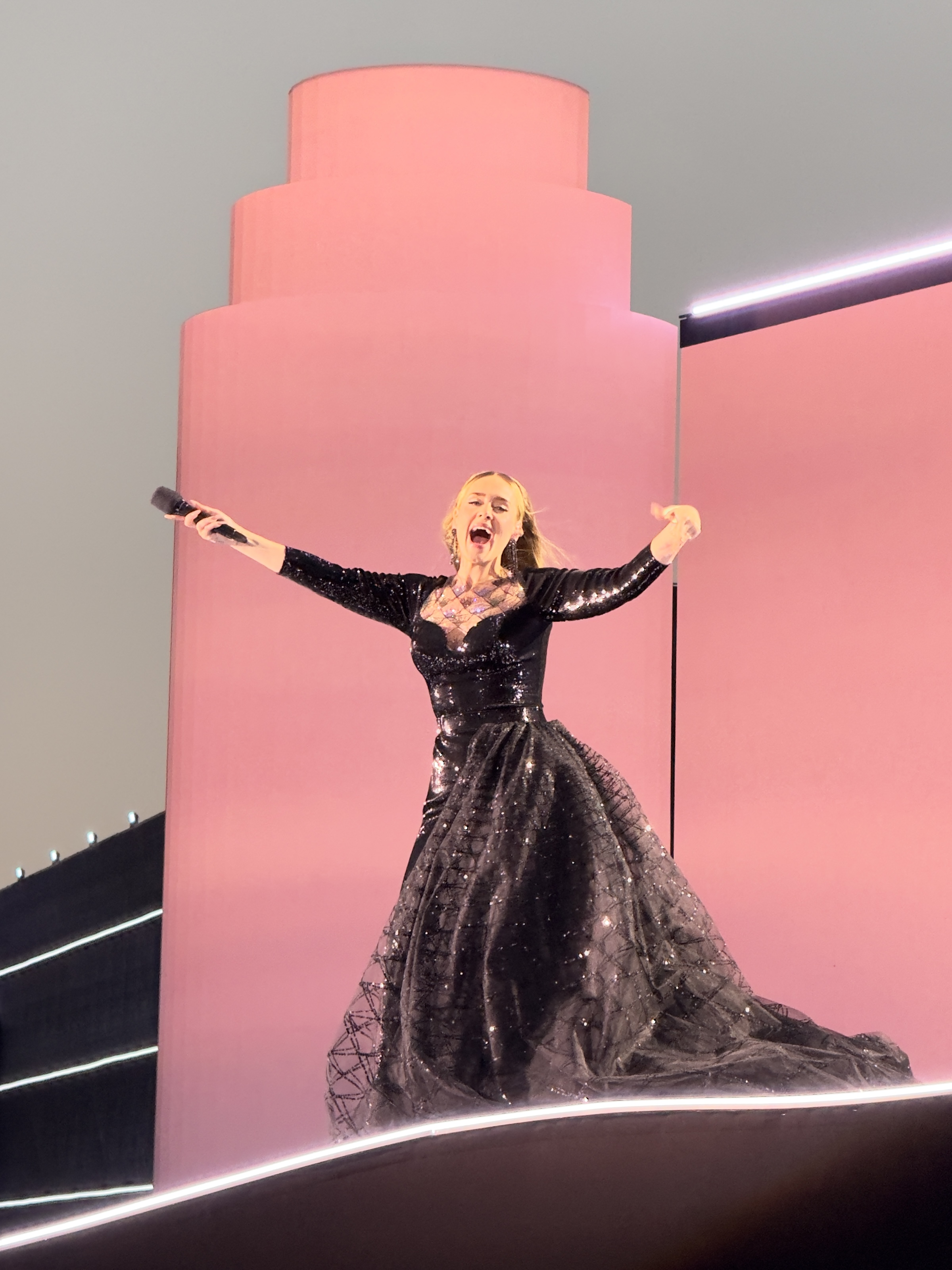
Adele found satisfaction in expressing her creativity through her written work for The Saturn Times.

Adele established her own fictional weekly gossip periodical, The Saturn Times, specifically for the Munich residency, to amuse herself with the media attention that tabloid publications frequently direct towards her. Kaufman noted that fabricated tabloid headlines often demonstrate perpetual scrutiny and intrusions into personal privacy. Thus, with her characteristic "cheeky wit", Adele created the "scandal sheet" featuring humorous headlines every Sunday after concerts, an activity she considered a highlight of her week, stating, "I think I missed my true calling! ... it is so much fun writing absolute nonsense!" Adele was the editor-in-chief of The Saturn Times, whose name was a reference to her Saturn tattoo. It featured Adele and people from her professional and personal circle in news pieces presented in a self-deprecating tone.

The Saturn Times was "just silly fun", wrote Kaufman, in contrast to the tabloid newspapers publishing sometimes entirely absurd and detrimental headlines. The first week's edition of the paper featured the headline "It's One Adele of a Ride!" along with a photograph of Adele riding a bicycle in the vacant stadium several days before the opening night, in addition to a brief narrative of her cycling excursion. The emphatic headline "Saturn Satire!" documented her meeting with the senior police official of Munich. Buchwald found it took a little time to find her way around in Adele World, even while holding The Saturn Times, which resembled a newspaper containing a printed plan of the area. The second week's edition, headlined "Storm Adele", reported on the adverse weather that threatened the concerts and included lower on the page an Editor's Note from her, paying tribute to her fans: "Hello... it's me. This show is yours and yours only." She, however, warned attendees not to stand on their chairs for safety reasons and to avoid spoiling the moment for those sitting behind them.

Ricardo Sanz of ABC said Adele's weeks in Munich marked a period of self-reinvention, as she explored a different professional sphere that, albeit connected to her primary occupation, enabled her to express her creativity. The near-weekly false reports about her purported engagement to Rich Paul made headlines in The Saturn Times, which, in a jesting tone, remarked that they had sparked a wave of emotion among her fan base "by seemingly announcing she's engaged for the 100th time this year". She wrote about an engaged couple from Venezuela whom she spotted in the crowd. A rain-drenched concert led Adele to coordinate her custom black Armani Privé gown with New Balance sneakers, inspiring her to write humorous remarks about the fervour it generated, under this edition's related headline "Adele's Balancing Act". The Guinness World Record set by the giant screen was later featured in The Saturn Times, with Adele's exultant commentary in the cover story.

== Reception ==
=== Critical response ===
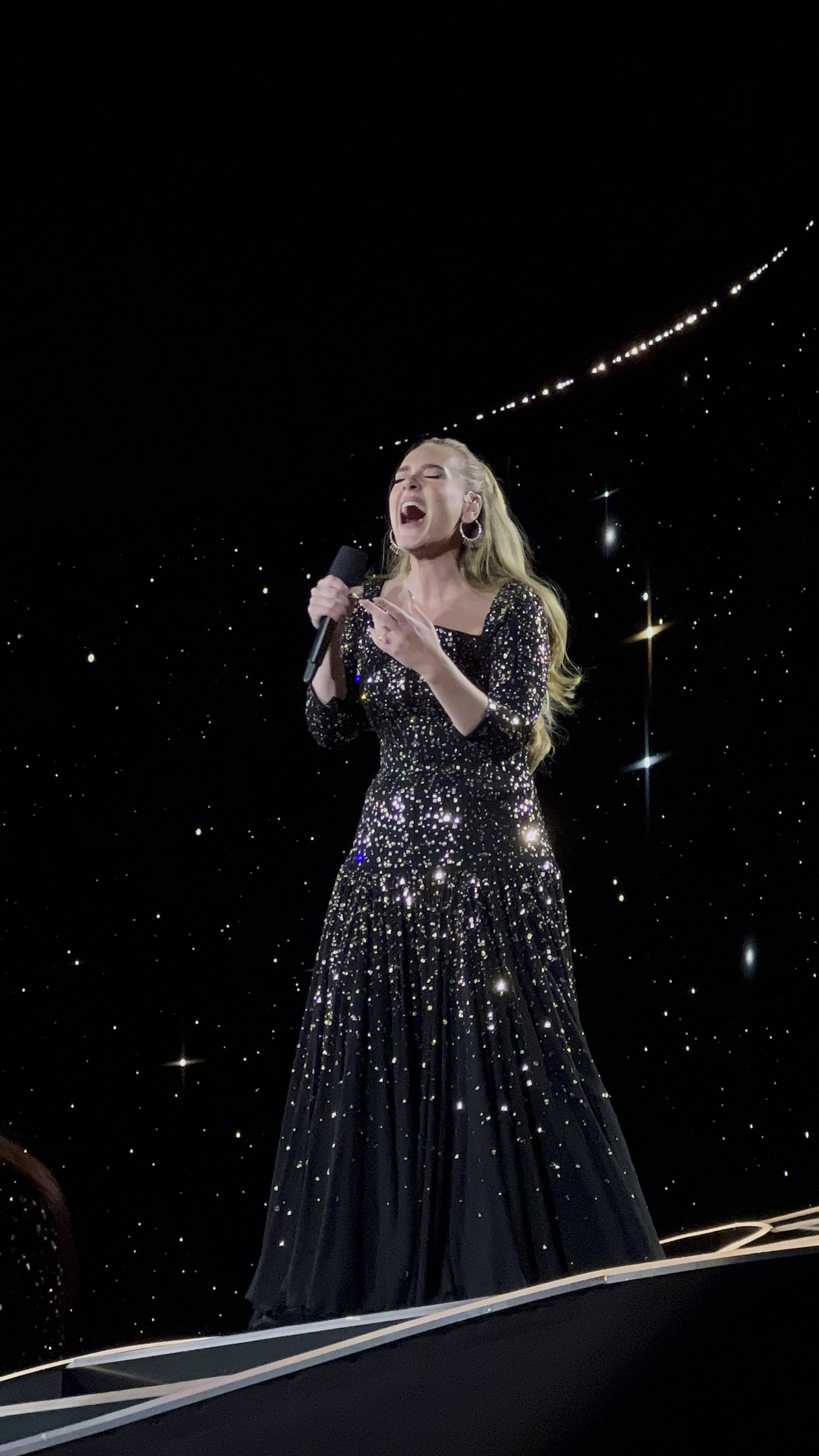
Journalists and critics praised Adele's vocal performance.

Journalists generally published laudatory reviews, with some offering contrasting perspectives. Arnaud Robert of Le Temps said the stadium was an "exorbitant temple, draped in black" and noted Adele's dress "constellated with mirror shards". Nussmayr praised Adele's performance, saying she "switches vocally, once started, no more gear down". She described the images of Adele on the LED video screen as "pin-sharp". Nussmayr said that the producers might have sometimes forgotten the screen's role as the primary means for most fans to see Adele and that more live shots would have been preferable to pre-recorded videos for certain songs. Matthias Alexander of Frankfurter Allgemeine Zeitung described an "atmosphere" that was both "relaxed" and "friendly". He made no observations concerning the music, stating, "and this is meant positively". He lauded Adele for being "vocally in shape" and for having "soul and a bit of blues" in her singing style, adding that "she doesn't exaggerate it with virtuosity as an end in itself". Alexander praised the organisers for having "actually managed an astonishing achievement" and deemed the sound "excellent" for an arena of this size, where a correct volume was conveyed despite difficulties at the residency's launch.

GQ Germany's Daniel Bilinski wrote that with this venue's presence, the "obsession with stars reaches a whole new sphere", while offering an "experience" distinct from concerts limited to conventional passive listening only. Rabea Weihser of Die Zeit found a weakness in the "technically perfect staging" when Adele appeared "small" to the naked eye, standing on the semicircle stage even though helped by the imposing video production counteracting this visual effect. She felt that "In its gigantism, the show can neither reflect the magic of Adele's music nor her person". From the theme park to the final fireworks display, "everything runs perfectly", she said before concluding, "Adele in Munich has become the unprecedented giant show it was planned to be."

Hénon-Cohin praised Adele for having "succeeded to preserve a very intimate atmosphere" and "despite the grandiose side of the show". Levine wrote that Adele "brought Vegas-style spectacle with her" and that the "scale of the show is absurd". He was initially sceptical about the limited view from the Adele Arena's upper tiers; still, he stated that for this reason, it was a common occurrence to look at screens at concerts and added that the "Munich production just made a virtue of it". Will Hodgkinson of The Sunday Times described Adele appearing to the crowd "full Rita Hayworth, golden age of glamour style hair and make-up" and called the staging "classy". He said Adele's voice was "as remarkable as ever, as powerful as it is vulnerable and emotional, and technically perfect".

=== Box office ===
At the launch of Adele in Munich, the "engagement" was already expected to surpass Coldplay's previous Billboard Boxscore "attendance record for a concert engagement", with 627,000 people attracted to ten concerts in Buenos Aires in 2022. According to Live Nation, in early September 2024, Adele in Munich "registered the highest attendance of any concert residency outside Las Vegas" for ten consecutive nights. More than 730,000 tickets were sold.

In 2024, gross revenue from ticket sales had not been transmitted to the media. Jonathan Dickins told Edith Bowman at SXSW London 2025 that it was "the single biggest grossing show by a female artist in history for one city". Peter Ackermann of Neue Zürcher Zeitung wrote that Adele earned about $50 million for her ten performances in Munich.

=== Accolades ===
Adele in Munich was nominated for Residency of the Year at the 2025 Pollstar Awards, which were held at the Beverly Hilton Hotel in Los Angeles.

== Crowd management ==
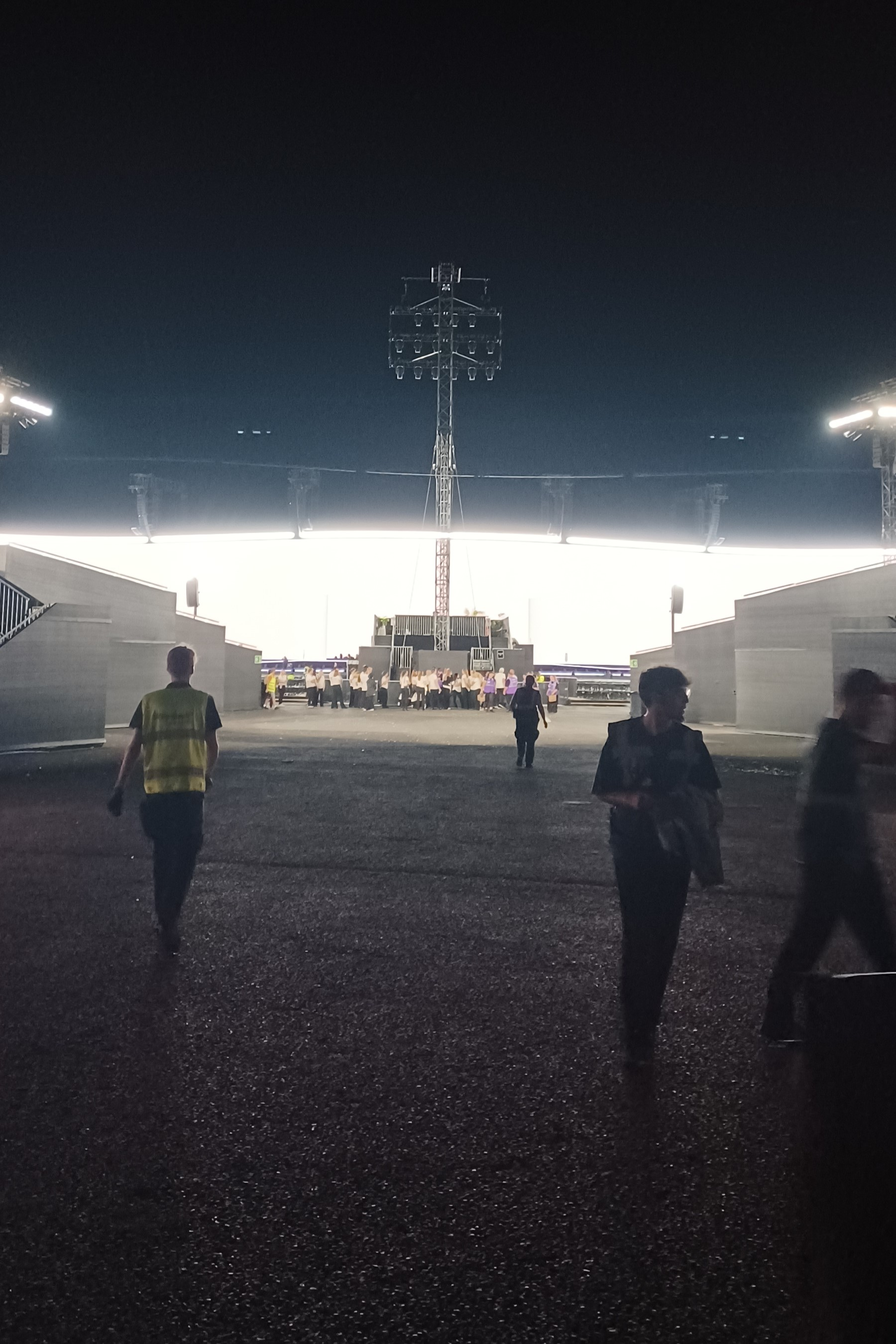
Photograph taken post-show. Activities in Adele World continued overnight.

The initial target was 80,000 people per concert, but Munich authorities permitted only approximately 74,000 due to safety requirements. Bavarian State Police's Polizeipräsidium München (lit. 'Munich Police Presidium') also warned that "traffic chaos" was feared. Bilinski compared the initial estimated 800,000 total attendees to Frankfurt am Main, Germany's fifth-largest city, which has a population of 775,000. Jonathan Dickins stated that the concerts would occur in all weathers: "If the fans get wet, Adele will get wet too and keep playing." An emergency plan was prepared to evacuate people to the exhibition halls in the event of violent storms. A meteorologist from the Deutscher Wetterdienst (lit. 'German Weather Service') was on site to monitor the evolution of the weather at each concert.

More than 100 emergency personnel, along with the Johanniter, were deployed to the site to provide support in the event of emergencies or minor incidents. Three first aid stations were ready on site. The fire department sent 25 employees, and the organisers registered 1000 security agents with the Munich authorities. The police had deployed "significantly more than a hundred" Beamte (lit. 'civil servants'), platoons of Einsatzhundertschaft (Note: In Germany, the Einsatzhundertschaft is an emergency division, a State Police task force.) and a squadron of the Reiterstaffel (unit of mounted police). Attendees could access the site by walking on Paul-Henri-Spaak-Straße, the abutting street, which was partially closed on both sides. As a safety measure, police patrols monitored the hill at De Gasperi-Bogen, where people without tickets tried to watch the concerts, and areas near the highway that were "viewed critically".

Leutgeb said preparations had been made to ensure efficient public transportation for all participants. The U-Bahn frequency was increased on concert days, as the Münchner Verkehrsgesellschaft (lit. 'Munich Transport Company') maximised its operational capacity for the event. The organisers implemented a shuttle bus system between the exhibition centre and Max-Weber-Platz station, transporting 20,000 passengers in the evening. The Munich municipal council's Social Democratic Party of Germany (SPD) considered this was "apparently too little". Before the first concert, people were greeted by Adele's pre-recorded voice message, which was broadcast on a loop throughout Friday in all U-Bahn stations. She could be heard saying over the loudspeakers: "Grüß Gott ('greeting'; 'God's greeting'), welcome to the Munich subway, I'm Adele". The organisers wanted to regulate the flow of departures by letting attendees "keep partying" on the site [Adele World] until midnight. (Note: Between 11 pm and midnight after the concert, fans transferred more than 1,000 gigabytes of data per hour through the O_{2} local mobile phone network.) The Messestadt Ost station had to be closed several times for a few minutes due to the overcrowding on the U2 line immediately after the concert on 2 August, despite Adele World's late opening. Five thousand parking spaces were also made available to participants.

== Impact ==
The City of Munich did not contribute financially to the total production cost. At the beginning of February 2024, Munich expected 500,000 overnight stays on both sides of the Isar river, which would increase "significantly" due to additional upcoming concerts. Lufthansa passengers who had to change flights from Munich to Chicago and Los Angeles were left to their own devices and confronted with the unavailability of accommodation in the city when a "technical irregularity" and "operational reasons" prevented the takeoff of two A380-type aircraft. A Lufthansa spokeswoman told Deutsche Presse-Agentur (dpa) on 4 August that all hotels in Munich were fully booked due to Adele's concerts. The convergence of Europeans to Munich engendered an "image boost" for the city because its name was mentioned "much more often". Baumgärtner described Adele's residency as an "economic godsend" for Munich.

Adele's concert residency attracted people from many different countries and continents. (Note: The mobile phone data of attendees present during the opening concert on 2 August 2024 were collected and then analysed by O_{2} of the telecommunications operator Telefónica and specialists at Invenium Data Insights. Data analysts determined audience composition using mobile country codes. According to the analysis, almost half were from abroad, including 10,000 Britons, the largest group of international supporters that day. Several thousand people came from Austria, the Netherlands and Poland. Smaller groups were from Argentina, Australia, Brazil, Canada, China and India. Furthermore, about 1,000 people came from the United States. The gathered information indicated that 60% of the audience were women. Most participants were already in Munich to attend the concert that day, and 3,500 people went directly from Munich Airport to the exhibition centre. According to an O_{2} Telefónica spokesperson, the analysis complied with the Datenschutzgesetz (Data Protection Act). It was based on anonymised mobile phone data.) Baumgärtner gave Karin Truscheit of Frankfurter Allgemeine Zeitung only an estimate of the proportion of people coming from abroad for all ten concerts: "probably" 40 to 70 per cent. Thomas Geppert, the country managing director of the Bavarian Hotel and Restaurant Association (DEHOGA Bayern), said that many foreigners, including those from the United States, took the opportunity to spend their vacations in Bavaria when they attended Adele's concerts. Geppert found a correlation between participants' geographic locations and the performance of the Munich hospitality industry. He further noted that the farther the participants were from Munich, the more hotels and restaurants were positively affected. On average, an overnight stay in the city on the day of an Adele concert was €255 (equivalent to $278 in mid-2024). Most residency participants stayed two or three nights. Munich set its hotel record in August 2024 with 2.1 million overnight stays.

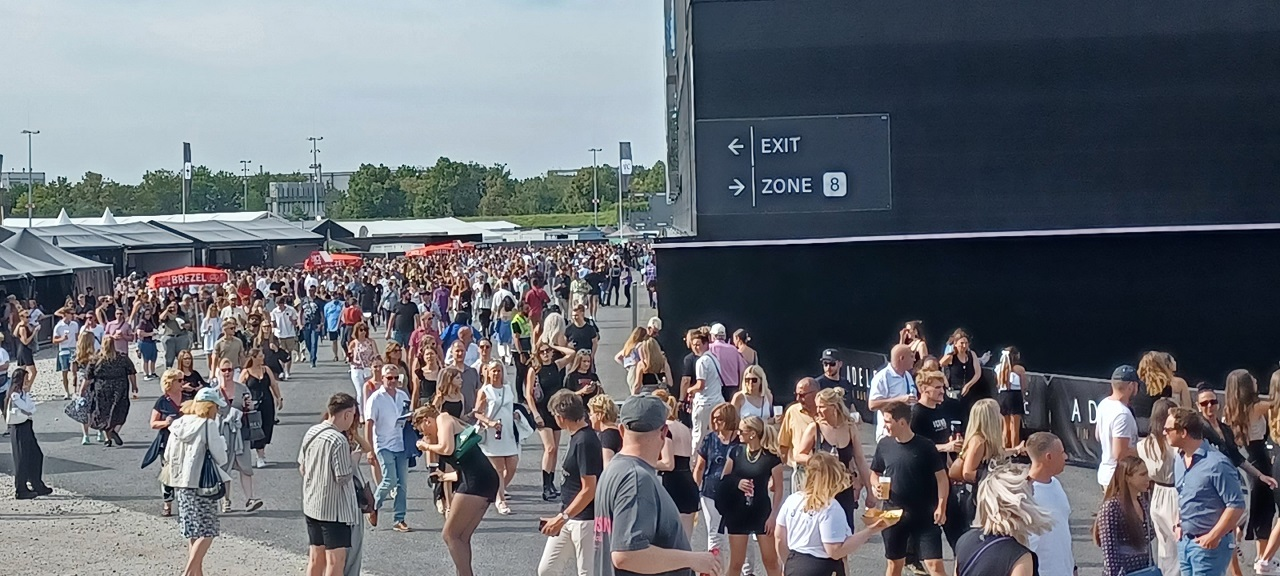
The ten-performance series, which attracted the highest total attendance ever at Munich Messe, injected more than half a billion euros into the city's economy.

Munich was cited in Adele's reports on all "relevant" press portals from more than 90 countries. Rummel highlighted the international attention the exhibition centre received, which contributed to the global visibility of its events. Adele's concert residency set a total attendance record at Munich Messe. The previous record occurred in 2019 during the seven-day Bauma, the international construction machinery trade fair, which attracted 610,000 visitors.

Baumgärtner initially projected that the ten concerts would inject €560‍–‍566 million (equivalent to $614‍–‍620M in mid-2024) into the Munich economy. In the end, the residency brought in more than €540 million (equivalent to $597M in mid-2024) to the city. Revenues were derived from various sources, including restaurants, public transportation, hotel accommodations, retail, and the rental of exhibition grounds. Manfred Gößl, managing director of the Munich Chamber of Industry and Commerce, said there had been an "additional local value added of several hundred million euros". "For the city and the region, this is a great success economically", Pfeiffer said.

Working in Austria and Germany, Leutgeb benefited from international exposure and media coverage. Neue Zürcher Zeitung's Max Sprick wrote that it "represents a new dimension even for Munich" and that the residency also shows "in which dimension" Adele "has now advanced as an artist". Bilinski said, "Adele sets new standards for the international industry". Neil Shah of The Wall Street Journal stated that the temporary venue's scale, technical production and cost "stunned the music business". Kirk Sommer, global co-head of music at William Morris Endeavor (WME), commented: "Adele could be the beginning of something".

== Incidents and controversies ==
Assessing Munich's stationary concert series elicited unfavourable opinions among climate advocates. Flights were underlined as a significant contributor to CO_{2} emissions. Julian Vogels, a German sustainability expert, believed that audience attendance is the primary source of concerts' carbon footprint and thought the effect could decline if Adele performed live in people's regions rather than having them converge by plane from all over the world to one location. (Note: According to Deutsche Presse-Agentur (dpa), flights reserved in advance on Booking.com to Munich between the beginning of February 2024 and the end of June 2024 saw a "significant" increase from England (+ 426%), France (+ 226%), Italy (+ 110%), and Spain (+ 133%) compared to the previous year.) Lieberberg refuted criticism that the concert series was unsustainable by citing the ecological aspect of this type of "planning" specific to concert residencies, which, "for artists with this tractive force", makes it possible to exclude moving "huge masses" of trucks and the travels of people [and tech crew]. Lieberberg stated that "it couldn't be more sustainable. ... Everything here will be reused, the stands, the chairs".

At the residency's launch phase, it was specified that photo and video journalists were not allowed to operate during the live performances. They usually do so during the first three songs at other significant concerts. Harald Stocker, chairman of the Bayerischen Journalisten-Verbands (BJV; Bavarian Journalists Association), stated, "This ban is completely unacceptable"; furthermore, the organiser would select the images and provide the media with a link to the selected material. Several discussions with management resulted in a definitive refusal. Live Nation stated that this protocol has been uniformly applied at all Adele concerts, "no matter when or where".

In mid-August, a physical altercation broke out between two security guards and a 26-year-old concertgoer from Northern Ireland before the start of a concert for unknown reasons. The man was beaten and injured and had to be taken to the hospital. The Munich police temporarily arrested the two security service members and later released them. According to the police, they have been investigated for gefährlicher Körperverletzung (lit. 'dangerous bodily harm'). The detailed course of events and the context of the confrontation were under investigation in the same month.

False tabloid stories claimed that Munich's temporary stadium could "go on tour" without considering that, given its size, it was not intended for such use from the outset. In October 2024, Birkett told Adam Woods of the trade publication IQ: "It's not tourable".

== Dismantling ==
The dismantling commenced the night after the final concert to meet the end-of-September completion deadline, with the work carried out in an area strictly closed to the public. The LED video screen was disassembled and divided into sections, which Solotech intended to reuse for future live events and installations. Live Nation provided no further information or explanation regarding the post-residency destination of the specially designed Adele stage elements. The entire asphalt was torn up and removed throughout the month due to its unsuitability for the upcoming Bauma event, and subsequently recycled. The finalisation of the dismantling marked the ground preparation for the trade show. (Note: International trade fairs that followed: Expo Real, Heim und Handwerk, and Bauma.)

Built for the sole purpose of hosting ten concerts, a "record-breaking", the venue disappeared "record-breakingly fast", commented BR24 reporter Nicole Remann; "irretrievably", said Leutgeb, adding, "I also promised the artist that and it's 'part of the deal': What's over there will never exist in this form again". Leutgeb insisted on preserving the project's distinctive character. In his own words, "When you get an artist thrilled about something like that and who says: I do this because I believe in it as regards content. Then the most important thing is that you don't copy it and do it again a second time". The video screen was thereafter transported across the Atlantic Ocean to be stored in Solotech's warehouse.

== Set list ==
This is the set list for the opening show on 2 August 2024. It may not represent all shows. (Note: The set list for the show on 3 August included "Turning Tables", which was placed between "Chasing Pavements" and "All I Ask". The Olympic women's 100-metre final was briefly broadcast on the LED video screen. On 5 August, it was reported that the Verve's "Bitter Sweet Symphony" was played over the stadium's loudspeakers at the end of the performance. The set list for 10 August 2024 was identical to the opening show's.)

1. "Hello"
2. "Rumour Has It"
3. "I Drink Wine"
4. "Water Under the Bridge"
5. "Easy on Me"
6. "One and Only"
7. "I'll Be Waiting"
8. "Oh My God"
9. "Send My Love (To Your New Lover)"
10. "Hometown Glory" (With orchestra)
11. "Love in the Dark" (With orchestra)
12. "Make You Feel My Love" (Bob Dylan song)
13. "Chasing Pavements"
14. "All I Ask"
15. "Skyfall" (With orchestra)
16. "Set Fire to the Rain" (With orchestra)
17. "All Night Parking" (Interlude)
18. "Hold On" (With orchestra)
19. "When We Were Young"
20. "Someone Like You"
21. "Rolling in the Deep"

== Shows ==
List of concerts
Date (2024)	City	Country	Venue	Opening acts	Attendance	Revenue
2 August	Munich	Germany	Adele Arena	Spice Girls Experience; DJ Mad; Florian Zimmer	730,000	—
3 August	Munich	Germany	Adele Arena	Spice Girls Experience; DJ Mad; Florian Zimmer	730,000	—
9 August	Munich	Germany	Adele Arena	Spice Girls Experience; DJ Mad; Florian Zimmer	730,000	—
10 August	Munich	Germany	Adele Arena	Spice Girls Experience; DJ Mad; Florian Zimmer	730,000	—
14 August	Munich	Germany	Adele Arena	Spice Girls Experience; DJ Mad; Florian Zimmer	730,000	—
16 August	Munich	Germany	Adele Arena	Spice Girls Experience; DJ Mad; Florian Zimmer	730,000	—
23 August	Munich	Germany	Adele Arena	Spice Girls Experience; DJ Mad; Florian Zimmer	730,000	—
24 August	Munich	Germany	Adele Arena	Spice Girls Experience; DJ Mad; Florian Zimmer	730,000	—
30 August	Munich	Germany	Adele Arena	Spice Girls Experience; DJ Mad; Florian Zimmer	730,000	—
31 August	Munich	Germany	Adele Arena	Spice Girls Experience; DJ Mad; Florian Zimmer	730,000	—
Total					730,000 / 730,000	—

== See also ==
- List of most-attended concert series at a single venue
