= Stageco =

Staging and event company

Stageco Group
- Type: Staging company
- Industry: live music, sports, corporate entertainment, public celebrations
- Founded: 1985
- Founder: Hedwig De Meyer
- Headquarters: Klein Terbankstraat 65, 3150 Haacht, Tildonk, Belgium
- Number of locations: Belgium, UK, France, Germany, Austria, Netherlands, United States
- Area served: Europe, UK, United States, Australia, Middle East, South Africa
- Key people: Hedwig De Meyer
- Products: live event support, custom stages, temporary buildings, festival stages, sporting structures, spot & delay towers, PA & video supports, turntables, lifts & hydraulic platforms, scaffolding structures, roof structures
- Services: structural calculations, design, build & installation
- Number of employees: 170
- Website: www.stageco.com

Stageco is an international staging, event and structures engineering company. They design and custom build concert stages, corporate and sporting structures and temporary buildings for many types of events.

With headquarters in Belgium, Stageco also has offices in France, the Netherlands, Germany, Austria and the United States. The Stageco Group employ around 170 staff including in-house designers, engineers, project managers and onsite crew.

== Company profile ==
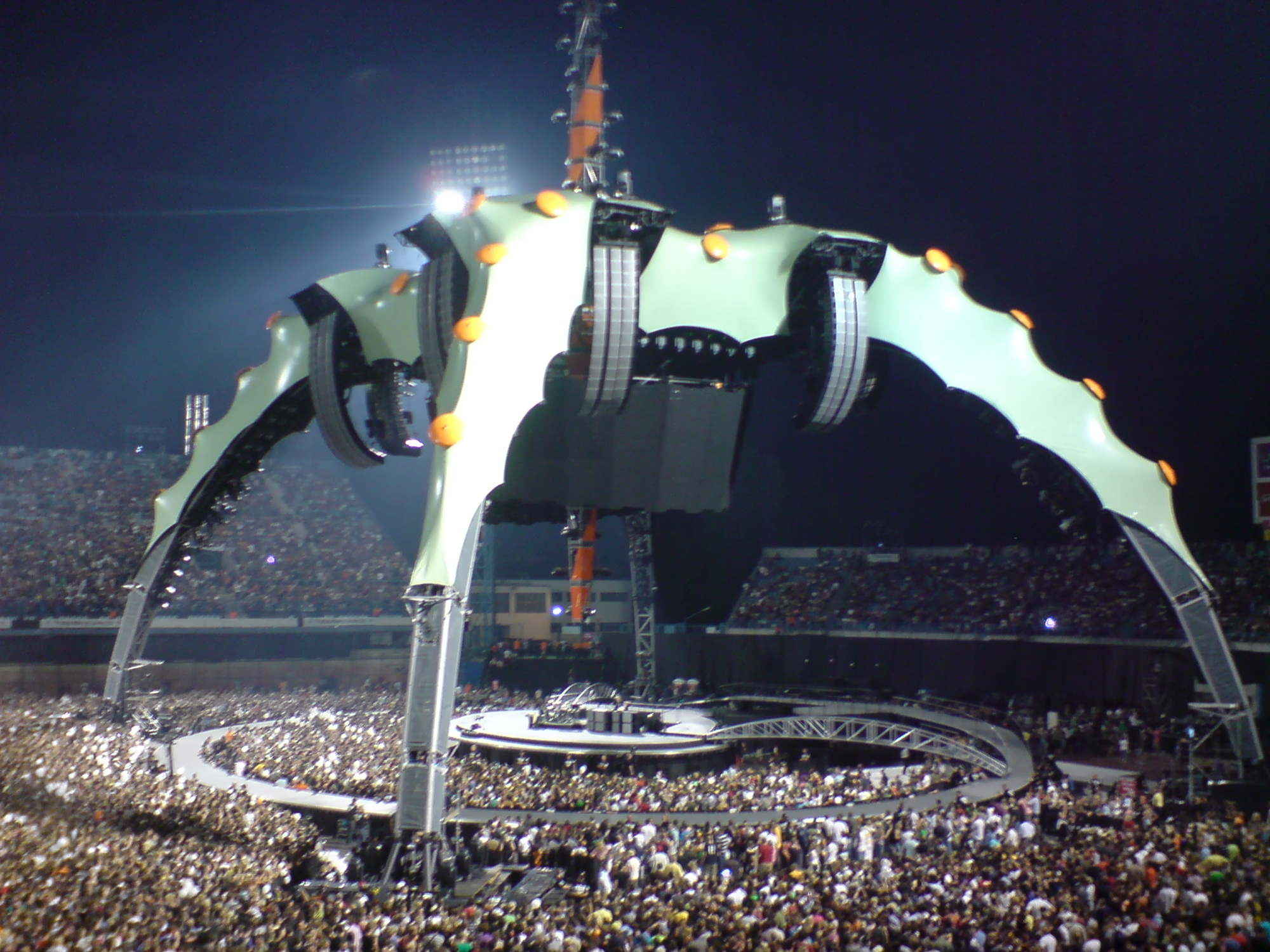
U2 360 tour stage in Stadion Maksimir, Zagreb, 2009

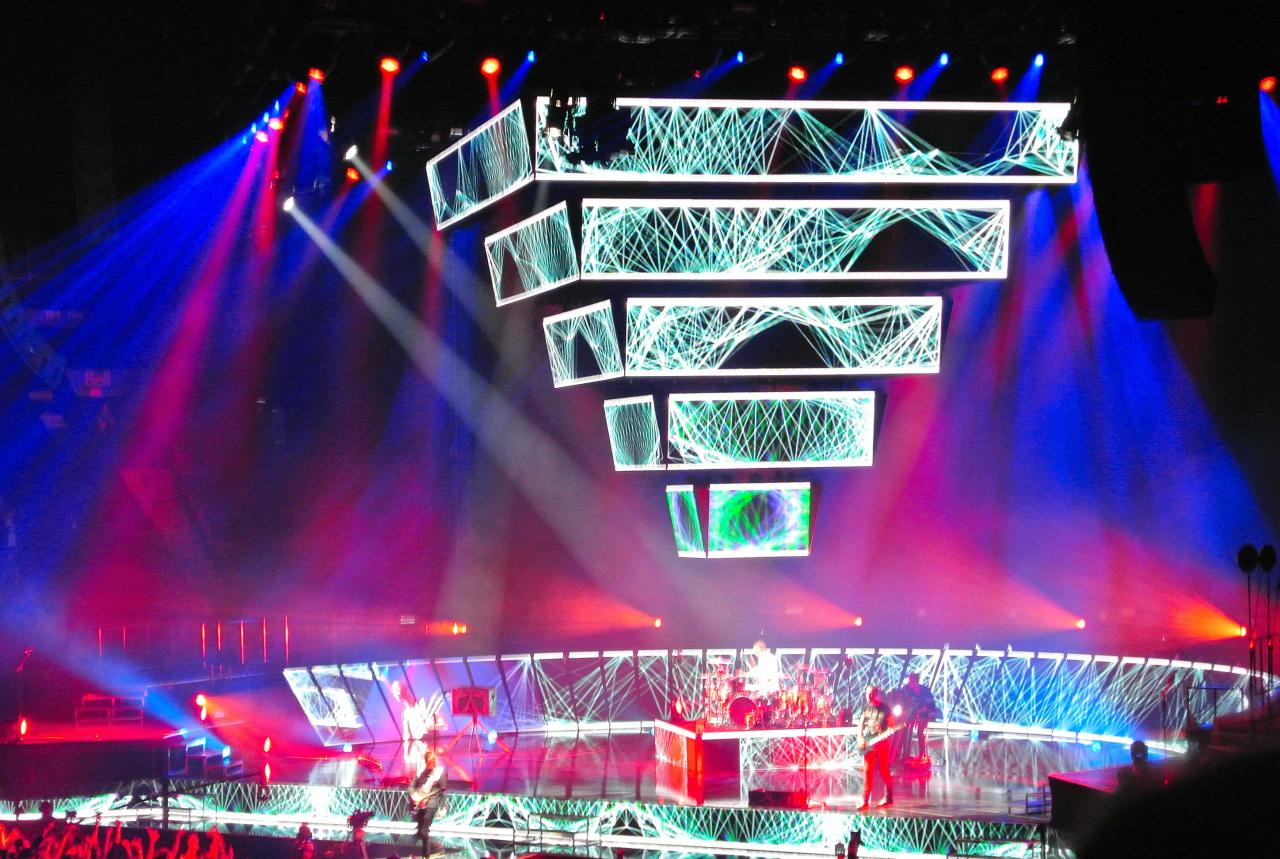
Muse The 2nd Law World Tour stage in Montreal, 2013

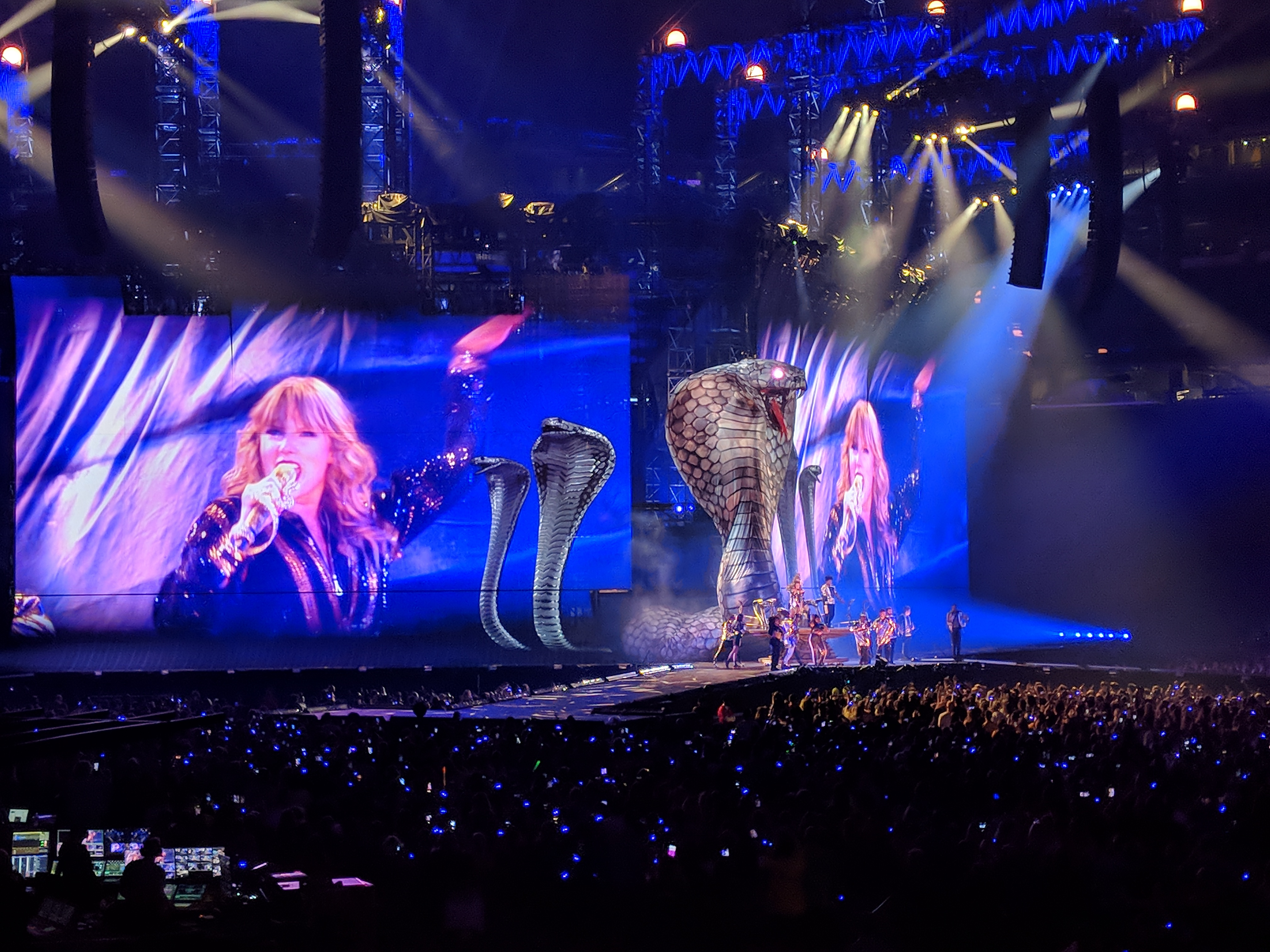
Taylor Swift Reputation Tour stage in Minneapolis, 2018

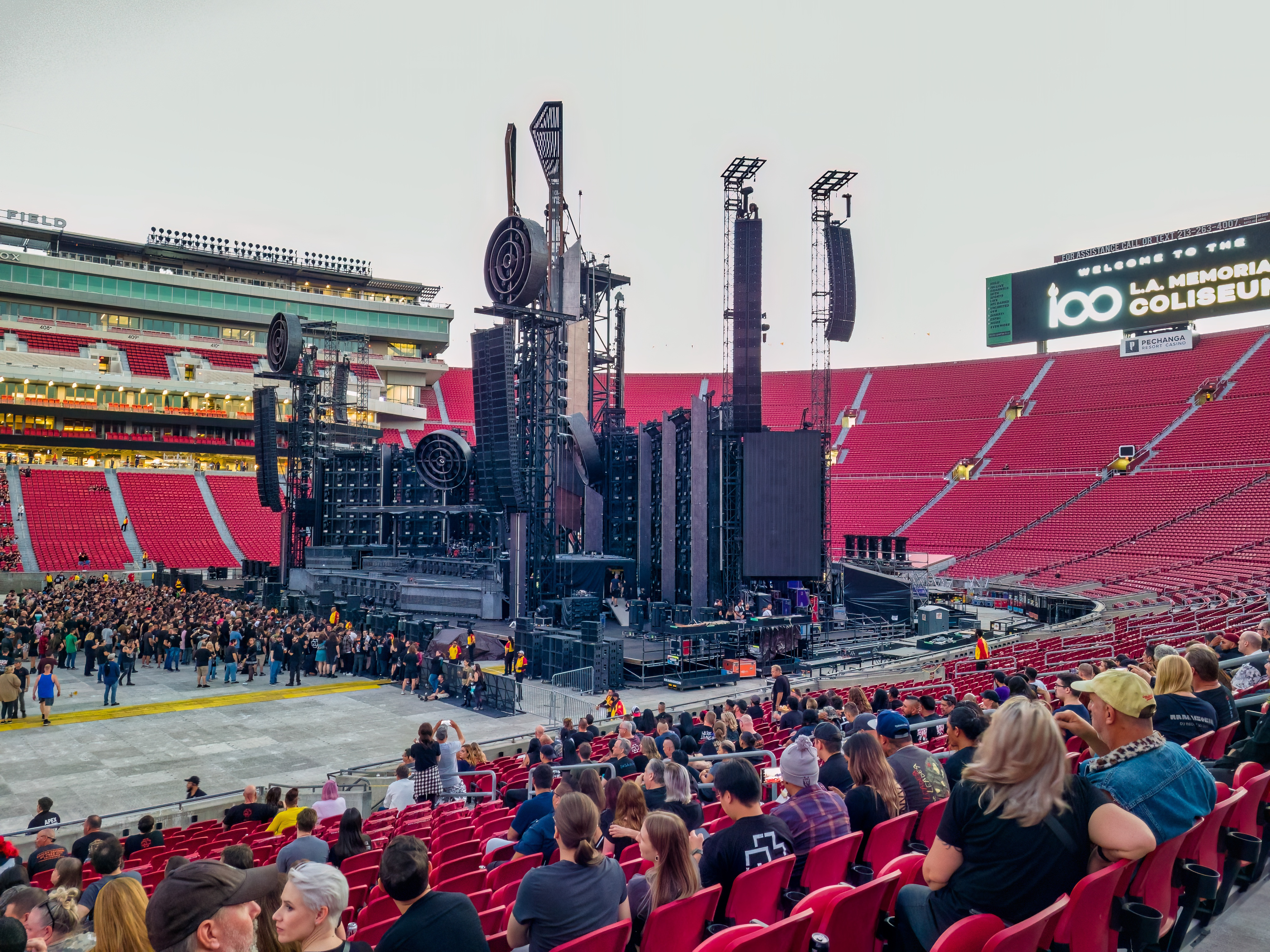
Rammstein stage in the Los Angeles Memorial Coliseum, 2022

Stageco designs and builds custom-made as well as standardised concert stages, temporary structures for all kind of events as well as supplying PA structures, sport and delay towers, event scaffolding, roof structures, hydraulic lifts and platforms and grandstand structures. Examples of their work include touring stages for Coldplay, Muse, and U2's 360 Tour. In 2010 Stageco created the double configuration stage at Download for AC/DC and bespoke temporary event structure The Drum for the Middle East Gas celebrations organised by WRG for the 77 Mta Task Force. The company also provide stages for a variety of festivals including 11 stages for Lowlands Festival, and a wide variety of high end fashion shows, including for French designer Sonia Rykiel.

== Company history ==
Stageco was founded by Hedwig De Meyer in Belgium in 1985, who built stages for the Rock Werchter Festival since 1977. By the mid eighties Stageco provided equipment for Genesis and Pink Floyd, whilst refining the tower systems and roofs. In 1992 the staging company worked directly with an architect to create a custom built stage for Genesis’ We Can't Dance tour. That same year Stageco US was incorporated, touring in the U.S. with Guns N' Roses and Metallica. Over the following years, new offices were opened in the Netherlands, Germany and France.

== Awards ==
Stageco was among seven winners in the Plasa innovation award for the companies new The Arena Lift Stageco won Favourite Staging Company in the 2012 TPi Awards.

== Concert tours ==
Overview of concert tours by Stageco
Artist	Tour	Area	Year
AC/DC	Black Ice World Tour	Europe	2009–2010
AC/DC	Rock Or Bust World Tour	North America, Europe and Australia	2015–2016
AC/DC	Power Up Tour	World	2024-2026
Adele	Adele in Munich	Germany	2024
A-ha	Ending On a High Note Tour	Norway	2010
Backstreet Boys	Backstreet Boys: Into The Millennium Homecoming: Live In Germany	Gernany	2026
Beyoncé	The Formation World Tour	North American + Europe	2016
Beyoncé	On the Run II Tour (with Jay-Z)	World	2018
Beyoncé	Renaissance World Tour	World	2023
Bon Jovi	Have a Nice Day Tour	Europe + North America	2006
Bon Jovi	Lost Highway Tour	Europe	2008
Bon Jovi	The Circle Tour	North America + Australia	2010
Bon Jovi	Bon Jovi Live	Europe	2011
Bon Jovi	Because We Can	Europe, North America + Australia	2013
Bon Jovi	This House Is Not For Sale Tour	Europe	2019
Bruce Springsteen	Wrecking Ball World Tour	Europe + North America	2012
Coldplay	Viva La Vida Tour	Europe	2009
Coldplay	Mylo Xyloto Tour	Europe + Australia	2012
Coldplay	A Head Full of Dreams Tour	World	2016–2017
Coldplay	Music of the Spheres World Tour	World	2022–2025
Depeche Mode	The Delta Machine Tour	Europe	2013
Genesis	Invisible Touch Tour	World	1986-1987
Genesis	We Can't Dance Tour	World	1992
Genesis	Turn It On Again: The Tour	Europe + North America	2007
Guns N' Roses	Use Your Illusion Tour	World	1991-1993
Guns N' Roses	Not in This Lifetime... Tour	North America + Europe	2016–2017
Harry Styles	Together, Together	World	2026-2027
Herbert Grönemeyer	Schiffsverkeher Tour	Germany	2011
Jay-Z & Justin Timberlake	Legends of the Summer Stadium Tour	North America	2013
Johnny Hallyday	Tour 66	France	2009
Kenny Chesney	The Big Revival Tour	North America	2015
Madonna	The MDNA Tour	Europe, North America + South America	2012
Metallica	WorldWired Tour	North America + Europe	2018–2019
Metallica	M72 World Tour	North America + Europe	2023–2027
Muse	The Resistance Tour	Europe	2010
Muse	The 2nd Law World Tour	Europe	2013
Muse	Simulation Theory World Tour	Europe	2019
Mylène Farmer	Mylène Farmer en tournée	Europe	2009
One Direction	Where We Are Tour	Europe + North America	2014
One Direction	On the Road Again Tour	Europe + North America	2015
Pink Floyd	A Momentary Lapse of Reason Tour	World	1987-1989
Pink Floyd	The Division Bell Tour	World	1994
Rammstein	Rammstein Stadium Tour	Europe + North America	2019–2024
Robbie Williams	Close Encounters Tour	Europe + Australia	2006
Robbie Williams	Take the Crown Stadium Tour	Europe	2013
Robbie Williams	The Heavy Entertainment Show Tour	Europe	2017
Roger Waters	The Wall Live	North America, South America + Europe	2012–2013
Take That	Take That Presents: The Circus Live	Europe	2009
Take That	Progress Live	Europe	2011
Take That	Greatest Hits Live	Europe	2019
Take That	The Circus Live – Summer 2026	Europe	2026
Taylor Swift	The 1989 World Tour	North America	2015
Taylor Swift	Reputation Stadium Tour	World	2018
Taylor Swift	The Eras Tour	World	2023–2024
The Police	The Police Reunion Tour	North America, South America, Australia + Europe	2007
The Rolling Stones	Voodoo Lounge Tour	World	1994-1995
The Rolling Stones	Bridges to Babylon Tour	World	1997-1998
The Rolling Stones	A Bigger Bang Tour	World	2005–2007
The Rolling Stones	14 On Fire	Europe + Australia	2014
The Rolling Stones	Zip Code Tour	North America	2015
The Rolling Stones	América Latina Olé	South America	2016
The Rolling Stones	No Filter Tour	World	2017–2021
The Rolling Stones	Sixty	Europe	2022
The Rolling Stones	Hackney Diamonds Tour	North America	2024
The Weeknd	After Hours til Dawn Tour	World	2022–2026
Tina Turner	Foreign Affair: The Farewell Tour	World	1990
U2	Zoo TV Tour	World	1992-1993
U2	PopMart Tour	World	1997-1998
U2	Vertigo Tour	World	2005–2006
U2	U2 360° Tour	World	2009–2011
U2	The Joshua Tree Tours 2017 and 2019	World	2017 + 2019
