= Kirk Sommer =

American talent agent

Kirk M. Sommer
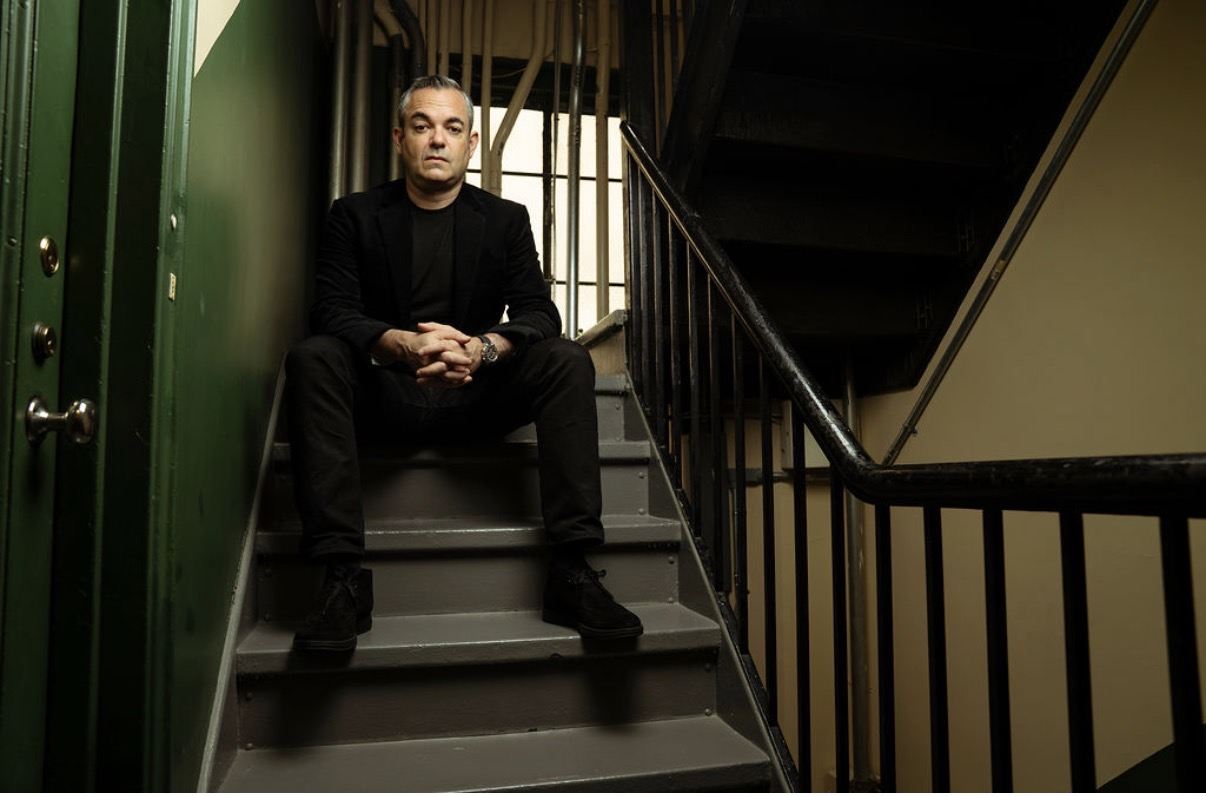
- Born: 1977 (age 48–49); New York, New York
- Education: New York University
- Occupation: Talent agent
- Years active: 2000–present
- Employer: WME
- Title: Senior partner and global head of music
- Spouse: Chloe Sommer (m. 2006)
- Children: 2
- Awards: Billboard Power 100; Variety 500; Pollstar Agent of the Year

Kirk M. Sommer is an American entertainment industry executive and talent agent. Based in New York and Los Angeles, he is senior partner and global head of music at WME.

== Early life and education ==
Sommer was born in New York. A music fan, he played several instruments growing up. In high school he played football, basketball, and soccer. He was the captain of several competitive soccer teams, and represented the United States at an international tournament in 1993.

Sommer attended New York University. He created, booked and promoted concerts and events during the four years he was an NYU student. He also interned for promoter Ron Delsener.

== Career ==
Sommer moved to Los Angeles following his graduation, and in 2000 was hired as an agent trainee at William Morris Agency. He started in the mailroom.

Sommer's early signings included The Killers (in 2003), Amy Winehouse (in 2006), and Adele (in 2007). Following William Morris's merger with Endeavor Talent Agency in 2009, he was promoted to partner. In 2013, he signed Sam Smith, Arctic Monkeys, and Hozier.

Sommer was named global co-head of music in 2015 and senior partner and global head of music in 2026. In addition to the Killers, Adele, Arctic Monkeys, Smith, and Hozier, Sommer represented artists including Steve Aoki, Andrea Bocelli, Benson Boone, Lewis Capaldi, Miley Cyrus, Billie Eilish, Carín León,Morrissey, Nine Inch Nails, Rage Against the Machine, Rihanna, Sienna Spiro, Teddy Swims, Weezer, and Lola Young.

WME booked an estimated 40,000 shows globally in 2023. As of 2026, there were approximately 300 agents across six global offices in WME's music division.

== Personal life ==
Sommer and his wife, Chloe—a jewelry designer and former journalist—were married in 2006. They have two daughters.

He is a mentor for agents and others early in their music industry careers. He and his family support several children's charities and non-profit organizations including Support and Feed, ABF, the Tegan and Sara Foundation, and Sam Smith's The Pink House.

== Recognition ==
Year	Award	By	Ref
2005	30 Under 30	Billboard	
2014-2026	Power 100	Billboard	
2015	40 Under 40	Billboard	
2021-2024	Variety 500	Variety	
2022-2026	Impact 50	Pollstar	.
2024-2026	Touring Power 100	Billboard	
2024	New York University Hall of Fame	NYU	
2025	Bobby Brooks Award/Agent of the Year	Pollstar	
2026	MUSEXPO International Music Person of the Year	MUSEXPO	
