= Paris bridges with "Passerelle" in their names =

The Paris bridges with "Passerelle" in their names (generally with the meaning "foot bridge") include the following:

- Passerelle Debilly
- Passerelle Léopold-Sédar-Senghor
- Passerelle Mornay
- Passerelle Simone-de-Beauvoir, which also accommodates bicycles
