= Passerelle (theatre) =

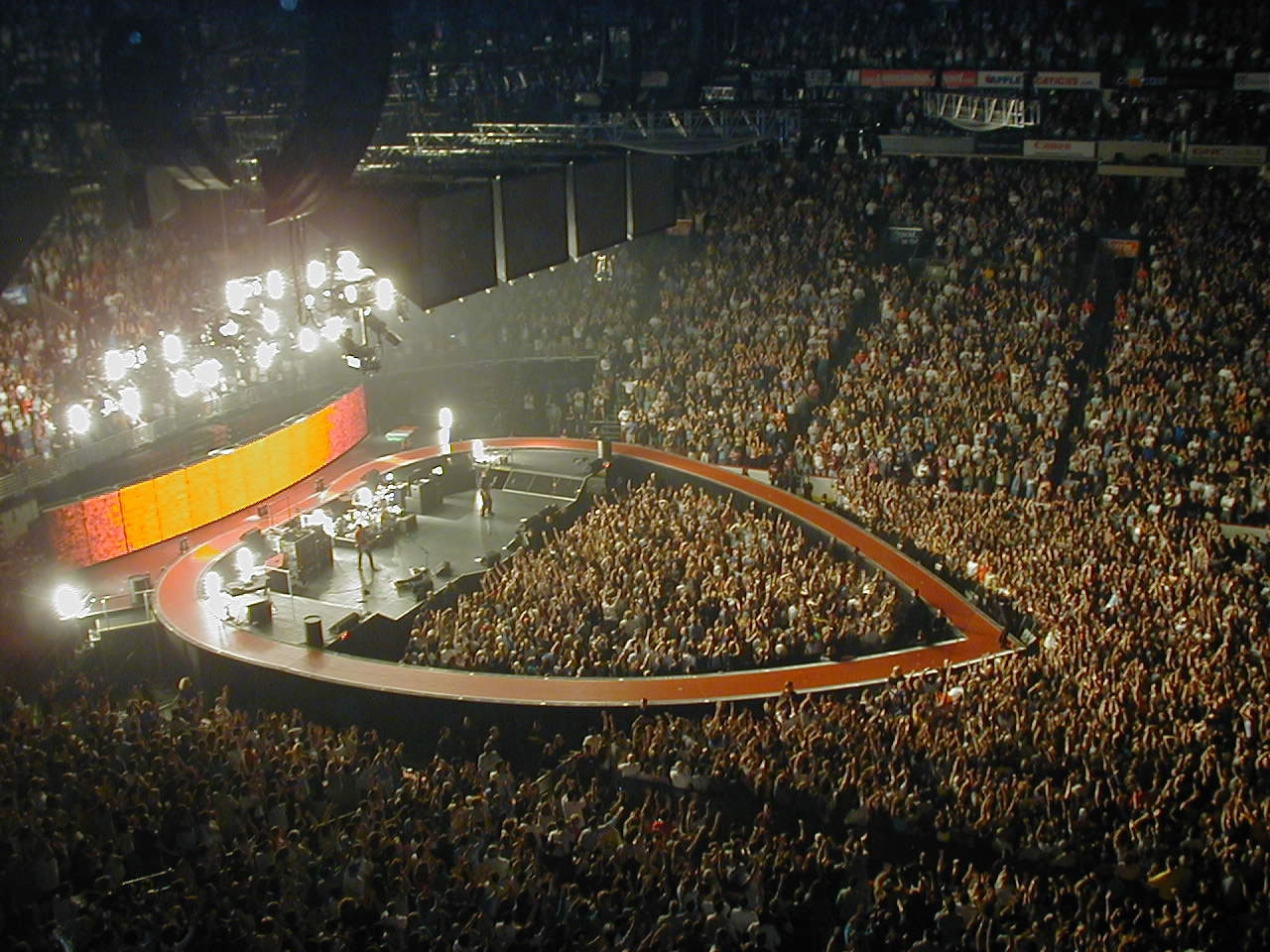
Set design for U2's 2001 Elevation Tour

The word passerelle is a French word that means "footbridge" or "gangway." In the theatre, it refers to a small catwalk that extends from one side of the stage to the other, passing in front of the orchestra pit. Besides increasing the total stage area, this stage design allows performers to be closer to the audience.

== Notable examples ==
One of the most prominent uses of a passerelle has been in the Broadway productions of the musical Hello, Dolly!. Notably, the show's memorable title song is staged – in part – on the passerelle.

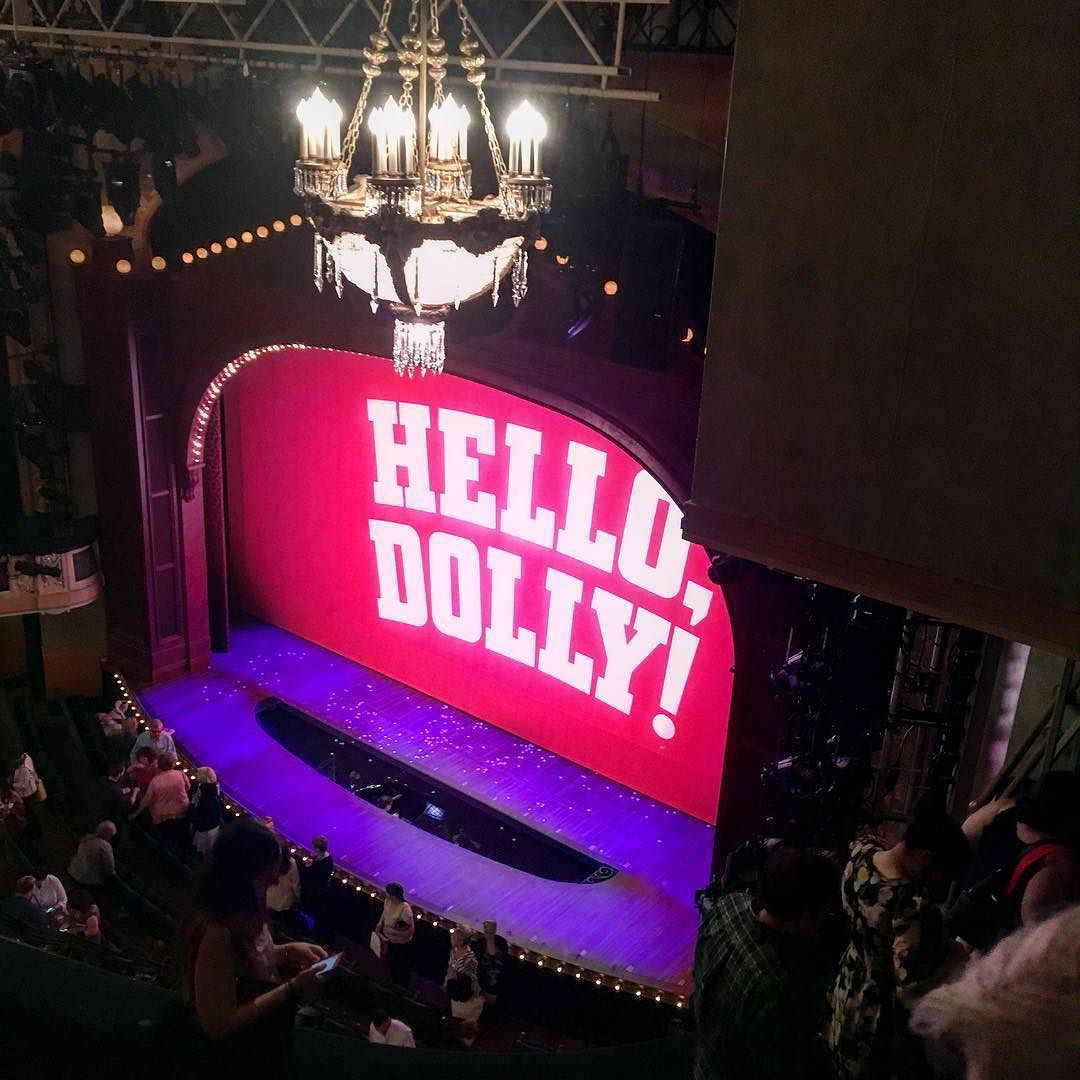
Hello, Dolly! at the Shubert Theatre

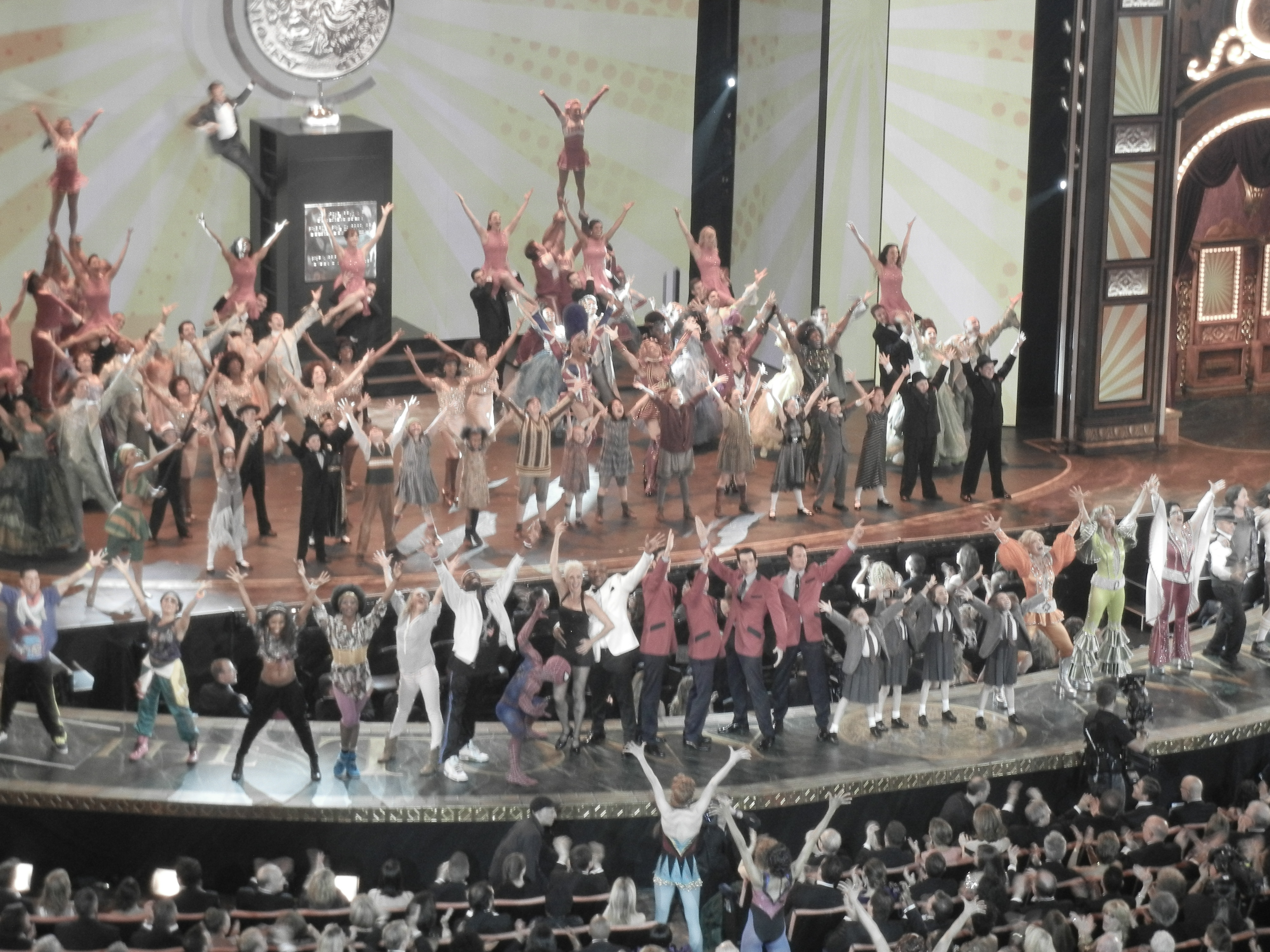
The 2013 Tony Awards at Radio City Music Hall
