= Adele discography =

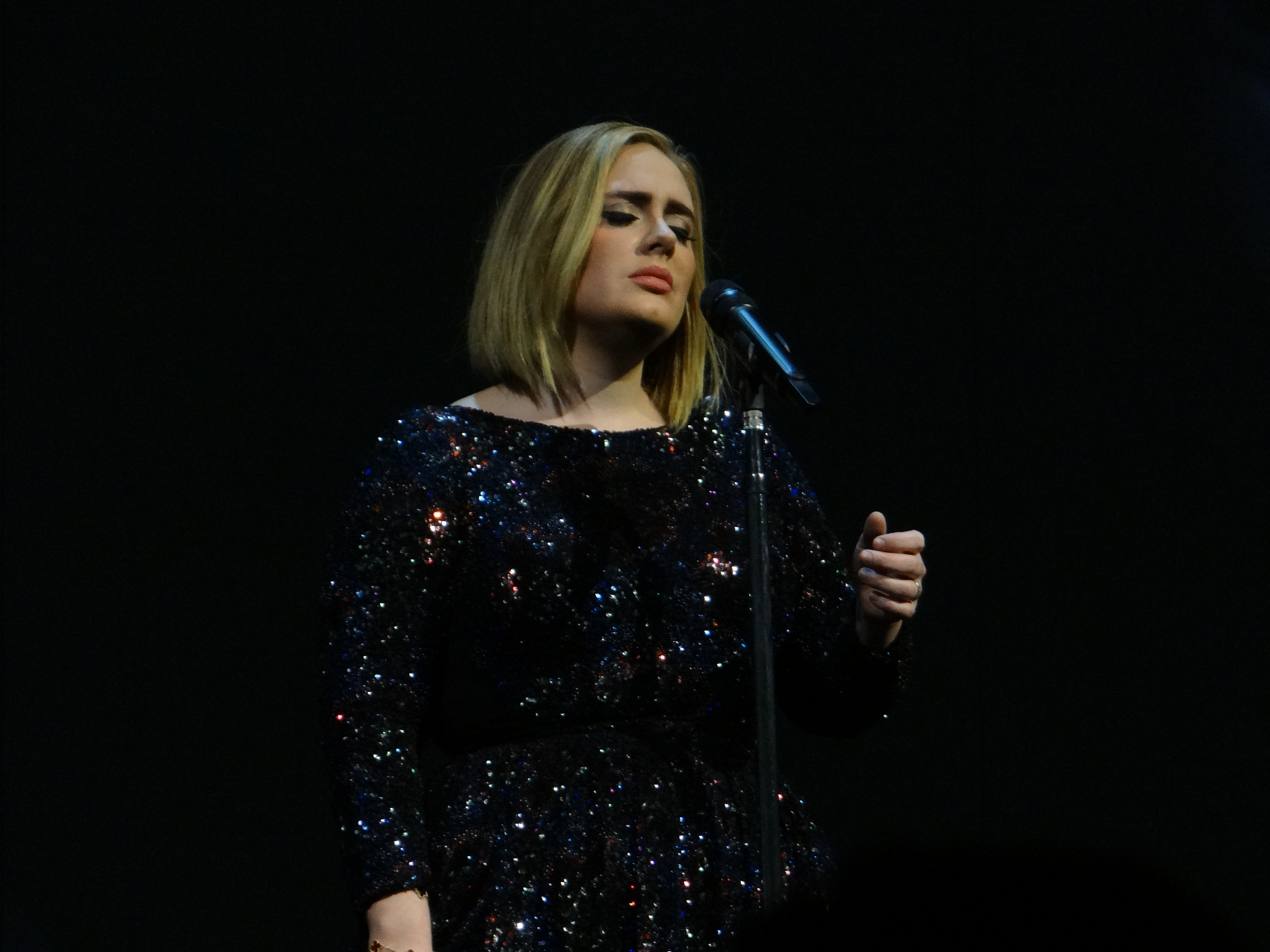
- Adele performing in 2016
- Studio albums: 4
- Extended plays: 2
- Live albums: 1
- Singles: 17
- Video albums: 1
- Music videos: 11

English singer-songwriter Adele has released four studio albums, one video album, two extended plays, 17 singles and eleven music videos. She was named the best-selling album artist of the 2010s decade in the US and worldwide. She also became the best-selling female artist of the 21st century in the UK. Her album 21 became the best-selling album of the 21st century.

Adele signed a record deal with XL in 2006, and released her debut album 19 in 2008. The album reached number one on the UK Albums Chart, and her single, "Chasing Pavements", reached number two on the UK Singles Chart. Another single, "Make You Feel My Love", reached number one in the Netherlands.

21, Adele's second studio album, was released on 24 January 2011. The album was immediately certified platinum by the British Phonographic Industry while debuting at number one. 21 spent 24 weeks atop the Billboard 200 since its US release. The album's first single, "Rolling in the Deep", also reached number two in the UK and became her first number one on the US Billboard Hot 100. The second single, "Someone like You", was released in February 2011 and peaked at number one in the UK and Ireland, her first in her home country. It also became her second number one in the US. "Set Fire to the Rain" was released as the third single off the album in the rest of Europe and became her third number one in the US. In 2012, it was confirmed Adele would record and release the new James Bond theme. In October of that same year, she released "Skyfall", which peaked at number two in the UK and number eight in the US, as well as reaching the top position in Germany, France, Ireland, the Netherlands and Switzerland. She also won the Academy Award for Best Original Song for "Skyfall".

25, Adele's third studio album, was released on 20 November 2015. It became the best-selling album of 2015 with 17.4 million copies sold within the year. "Hello" was released as the lead single from the album on 23 October 2015 and peaked atop the charts in United Kingdom, where it became her second UK number-one single. In the United States the song debuted at number one on the Billboard Hot 100, becoming Adele's fourth number-one single in the US and breaking several records, including becoming the first song with over a million digital sales in a week. As of March 2016, Adele had sold over 10 million albums in the UK; meanwhile, in the US, the singer has sold 31 million albums as of January 2022.

30, Adele's fourth studio album, was released on 19 November 2021. It was an international success, topping the official charts in 34 countries. It became the best-selling album worldwide for 2021, with 4.68 million copies sold within the year. It became the best-selling album of the 2020s decade in the world and in the UK. It also became the best-selling album of 2021 and 2022 in the US. "Easy on Me" was released as the lead single on 15 October 2021 to international success, peaking atop charts in over 25 countries, including the UK Official Singles Chart and the US Billboard Hot 100. It became Adele's longest-running number one single in the UK, topping the chart for 8 weeks. In addition, after 30's release, Adele's total weeks at number one rose to 42 weeks at number one on the UK Official Albums Chart, more than any other female singer. After 30 spent six consecutive weeks at number one on the Billboard 200, Adele became the British soloist with the most weeks at number one in the chart's history, with 40 weeks.

== Albums ==
=== Studio albums ===
List of studio albums, with selected chart positions, sales figures, and certifications
Title	Details	Peak chart positions										Sales	Certifications
Title	Details	UK	AUS	CAN	FRA	GER	IRL	NLD	NZ	SWI	US	Sales	Certifications
19	Released: 28 January 2008; Label: XL, Columbia; Formats: Digital download, CD, LP, streaming	1	3	4	15	15	2	1	3	15	4	UK: 2,700,000 (Note: United Kingdom sales figures for 19 as of August 2022.); AUS: 214,000 (Note: Australia sales figures for 19 as of November 2016.); NLD: 350,000 (Note: Netherlands sales figures for 19 as of December 2011.); US: 3,100,000 (Note: United States sales figures for 19 as of May 2021.)	BPI: 9× Platinum; ARIA: 2× Platinum; BVMI: Platinum; IFPI SWI: Platinum; MC: 4× Platinum; NVPI: 5× Platinum; RIAA: 4× Platinum; RMNZ: 4× Platinum
21	Released: 24 January 2011; Label: XL, Columbia; Formats: Digital download, CD, LP, streaming	1	1	1	1	1	1	1	1	1	1	UK: 5,700,000 (Note: United Kingdom sales figures for 21 as of August 2022.); AUS: 1,105,000 (Note: Australia sales figures for 21 as of November 2016.); CAN: 1,582,000 (Note: Canada sales figures for 21 as of January 2020.); FRA: 1,800,000 (Note: France sales figures for 21 as of January 2021.); IRL: 270,000 (Note: Ireland sales figures for 21 as of August 2012.); NLD: 411,000 (Note: Netherlands sales figures for 21 as of December 2011.); US: 12,100,000 (Note: United States sales figures for 21 as of May 2021.)	BPI: 19× Platinum; ARIA: 17× Platinum; BVMI: 8× Platinum; IFPI SWI: 7× Platinum; IRMA: 18× Platinum; MC: 2× Diamond; NVPI: 9× Platinum; RIAA: 17× Platinum; RMNZ: 18× Platinum
25	Released: 20 November 2015; Label: XL, Columbia; Formats: Digital download, CD, LP, streaming	1	1	1	1	1	1	1	1	1	1	UK: 3,830,657 (Note: United Kingdom sales figures for 25 as of August 2022.); AUS: 603,000 (Note: Australia sales figures for 25 as of November 2016.); CAN: 1,093,000 (Note: Canada sales figures for 25 as of January 2020.); FRA: 1,000,000 (Note: France sales figures for 25 as of November 2021.); GER: 263,000 (Note: Germany first-week sales figures for 25.); IRL: 107,000 (Note: Ireland sales figures for 25 as of January 2016.); NLD: 320,000 (Note: Netherlands sales figures for 25 as of December 2015.); US: 9,600,000 (Note: United States sales figures for 25 as of May 2021.)	BPI: 14× Platinum; ARIA: 10× Platinum; BVMI: 6× Platinum; IFPI SWI: 6× Platinum; MC: Diamond; RIAA: 12× Platinum; RMNZ: 16× Platinum
30	Released: 19 November 2021; Label: Columbia; Formats: Digital download, CD, LP, streaming, cassette	1	1	1	1	1	1	1	1	1	1	UK: 731,414 (Note: United Kingdom sales figures for 30 as of August 2022.); CAN: 114,000 (Note: Canada sales figures for 30 as of February 2022.); FRA: 300,000 (Note: France sales figures for 30 as of August 2023.); US: 1,760,000 (Note: United States sales figures for 30 as of January 2023.)	BPI: 3× Platinum; ARIA: Platinum; BVMI: Platinum; IFPI SWI: Platinum; MC: 3× Platinum; RIAA: 3× Platinum; RMNZ: 4× Platinum; SNEP: 3× Platinum

=== Live albums ===
List of live albums
Title	Details
Weekends with Adele Live in Las Vegas	Released: February 2025; Label: Columbia; Formats: LP

=== Video albums ===
List of video albums, with selected chart positions, sales figures, and certifications
Title	Details	Peak chart positions									Sales	Certifications
Title	Details	UK	AUS	FRA	GER	IRL	ITA	NLD	SWI	US	Sales	Certifications
Live at the Royal Albert Hall	Released: 28 November 2011; Label: XL; Formats: CD+DVD, BD	2	1	1	5	1	16	1	1	1	UK: 150,000; US: 1,000,000 (Note: United States sales figures for Live at the Royal Albert Hall as of May 2013.)	BPI: 3× Platinum; ARIA: 7× Platinum; BVMI: 4× Platinum; MC: Diamond; RIAA: Diamond; SNEP: Gold

== Extended plays ==
List of extended plays, with selected chart positions, and sales figures
Title	Details	Peak chart positions				Sales
Title	Details	UK	FRA	IRL	US	Sales
iTunes Live from SoHo	Released: 3 February 2009; Label: XL; Formats: Digital download	—	—	—	105	US: 81,000 (Note: United States sales figures for iTunes Live from SoHo as of May 2021.)
iTunes Festival: London 2011	Released: 13 July 2011; Label: XL; Formats: Digital download	74	112	45	50	US: 72,000 (Note: United States sales figures for iTunes Festival: London 2011 as of May 2021.)
"—" denotes an album that did not chart or was not released in that territory.

== Singles ==
=== As lead artist ===
==== 2000s ====
List of singles as lead artist released in the 2000s, showing year released, selected chart positions, sales, certifications, and originating album
Title	Year	Peak chart positions										Sales	Certifications	Album
Title	Year	UK	CAN	EUR	FRA	GER	IRL	NLD	NOR	SWE	US	Sales	Certifications	Album
"Hometown Glory"	2007	19	—	58	51	—	78	53	89	57	—		BPI: 2× Platinum; MC: Platinum; RMNZ: Platinum	19
"Chasing Pavements"	2008	2	28	8	180	46	7	3	1	37	21	FRA: 10,430 (Note: France sales figures for "Chasing Pavements" as of December 2009.); US: 1,200,000 (Note: United States sales figures for "Chasing Pavements" as of October 2011.)	BPI: 3× Platinum; IFPI NOR: Gold; MC: 3× Platinum; RIAA: Platinum; RMNZ: 3× Platinum	19
"Cold Shoulder"	2008	18	—	61	—	—	—	68	—	—	—		BPI: Silver	19
"Make You Feel My Love"	2008	4	— (Note: "Make You Feel My Love" did not enter the Billboard Canadian Hot 100, but peaked at number 16 on the Hot Canadian Digital Song Sales chart.)	17	—	—	5	1	—	44	— (Note: "Make You Feel My Love" did not enter the Billboard Hot 100, but peaked at number 11 on the Digital Song Sales chart.)	UK: 1,002,171 (Note: United Kingdom sales figures for "Make You Feel My Love" as of September 2017.)	BPI: 5× Platinum; MC: 5× Platinum; RIAA: Gold; RMNZ: 4× Platinum	19
"—" denotes a single that did not chart or was not released in that territory.

==== 2010s ====
List of singles as lead artist released in the 2010s, showing year released, selected chart positions, sales, certifications, and originating album
Title	Year	Peak chart positions										Sales	Certifications	Album
Title	Year	UK	AUS	CAN	FRA	GER	IRL	NLD	NZ	SWI	US	Sales	Certifications	Album
"Rolling in the Deep"	2010	2	3	1	3	1	2	1	3	1	1	UK: 1,086,347 (Note: United Kingdom sales figures for "Rolling in the Deep" as of September 2017.); FRA: 346,000 (Note: France sales figures for "Rolling in the Deep" as of June 2014.); US: 8,400,000 (Note: United States sales figures for "Rolling in the Deep" as of October 2015.)	BPI: 5× Platinum; ARIA: 7× Platinum; BVMI: Platinum; IFPI SWI: 3× Platinum; MC: Diamond; RIAA: 8× Platinum; RMNZ: 7× Platinum	21
"Someone like You"	2011	1	1	2	1	4	1	2	1	1	1	UK: 1,644,597 (Note: United Kingdom sales figures for "Someone like You" as of September 2017.); FRA: 357,000 (Note: France sales figures for "Someone like You" as of June 2014.); US: 6,000,000 (Note: United States sales figures for "Someone like You" as of October 2015.)	BPI: 8× Platinum; ARIA: 7× Platinum; BVMI: Platinum; MC: Diamond; RIAA: 5× Platinum; RMNZ: 8× Platinum	21
"Set Fire to the Rain"	2011	11	11	2	9	6	6	1	8	4	1	FRA: 160,000 (Note: France sales figures for "Set Fire to the Rain" as of June 2014.); US: 4,552,000 (Note: United States sales figures for "Set Fire to the Rain" as of June 2013.)	BPI: 5× Platinum; ARIA: 3× Platinum; BVMI: Platinum; IFPI SWI: Platinum; MC: Diamond; RIAA: 4× Platinum; RMNZ: 6× Platinum	21
"Rumour Has It"	2011	85	69	16	172	68	71	52	—	— (Note: "Rumour Has It" did not enter the Swiss Singles chart, but charted at number 12 on the Swiss Airplay chart.)	16	US: 408,000 (Note: United States sales figures for "Rumour Has It" as of November 2011.)	BPI: Platinum; ARIA: Gold; MC: 3× Platinum; RIAA: 2× Platinum; RMNZ: Platinum	21
"Turning Tables"	2011	62	34	60	—	85	—	45	—	—	63	US: 883,000 (Note: United States sales figures for "Turning Tables" as of May 2015.)	BPI: Platinum; ARIA: Gold; MC: Platinum; RIAA: Gold; RMNZ: 2× Platinum	21
"Skyfall"	2012	2	5	3	1	1	1	1	2	1	8	FRA: 334,500 (Note: France sales figures for "Skyfall" as of June 2014.); US: 1,200,000 (Note: United States sales figures for "Skyfall" as of January 2013.)	BPI: 3× Platinum; ARIA: Platinum; BVMI: 3× Gold; MC: 5× Platinum; RIAA: Platinum; RMNZ: 3× Platinum	Skyfall: Original Motion Picture Soundtrack
"Hello"	2015	1	1	1	1	1	1	1	1	1	1	UK: 948,618 (Note: United Kingdom sales figures for "Hello" as of September 2017.); FRA: 104,700 (Note: France sales figures for "Hello" as of December 2015.); US: 5,037,000 (Note: United States sales figures for "Hello" as of January 2020.)	BPI: 5× Platinum; ARIA: 7× Platinum; BVMI: Platinum; IFPI SWI: Platinum; MC: Diamond; RIAA: 7× Platinum; RMNZ: 7× Platinum	25
"When We Were Young"	2016	9	13	9	15	29	12	24	23	5	14	US: 150,000 (Note: United States sales figures for "When We Were Young" as of December 2015.)	BPI: 4× Platinum; ARIA: Platinum; MC: 6× Platinum; RIAA: Platinum; RMNZ: 5× Platinum	25
"Send My Love (To Your New Lover)"	2016	5	13	10	45	31	7	32	4	18	8		BPI: 3× Platinum; ARIA: Platinum; MC: 6× Platinum; RIAA: Platinum; RMNZ: 5× Platinum; SNEP: Gold	25
"Water Under the Bridge"	2016	39	23	37	56	80	27	71	15	77	26	US: 104,000 (Note: United States sales figures for "Water Under the Bridge" as of December 2015.)	BPI: 2× Platinum; ARIA: Gold; MC: 2× Platinum; RIAA: Gold; RMNZ: 4× Platinum	25
"—" denotes a single that did not chart or was not released in that territory.

==== 2020s ====
List of singles as lead artist released in the 2020s, showing year released, selected chart positions, certifications, and originating album
Title	Year	Peak chart positions										Certifications	Album
Title	Year	UK	AUS	CAN	FRA	GER	IRL	NZ	SWI	US	WW	Certifications	Album
"Easy on Me"	2021	1	1	1	2	1	1	1	1	1	1	BPI: 4× Platinum; ARIA: 6× Platinum; BVMI: Platinum; IFPI SWI: 3× Platinum; MC: 3× Platinum; RIAA: 4× Platinum; RMNZ: 6× Platinum; SNEP: Diamond	30
"Oh My God"	2021	2	6	8	48	24	3	4	7	5	3	BPI: Platinum; ARIA: Platinum; IFPI SWI: Gold; RIAA: Platinum; RMNZ: 2× Platinum; SNEP: Platinum	30
"I Drink Wine"	2022	4	10	10	81	—	5	7	— (Note: "I Drink Wine" did not enter the Swiss Singles chart, but charted at number 19 on the Swiss Hitparade Streaming chart.)	18	10	BPI: Platinum; ARIA: Gold; RIAA: Gold; RMNZ: Platinum	30
"—" denotes a single that did not chart or was not released in that territory.

=== As featured artist ===
List of singles as featured artist, showing year released, selected chart position, and originating album
Title	Year	Peak chart positions	Album
Title	Year	UK	Album
"Be Divine" (Ricsta featuring Adele)	2006	—	Non-album single
"Water and a Flame" (Daniel Merriweather featuring Adele)	2009	180	Love & War
"—" denotes an album that did not chart or was not released in that territory.

== Other charted and certified songs ==
List of other charted and certified songs, with selected chart positions and certifications, showing year released and album name
Title	Year	Peak chart positions										Certifications	Album
Title	Year	UK	AUS	CAN	FRA	GER	IRL	NLD	SWI	US	WW	Certifications	Album
"Daydreamer"	2008	171	—	—	—	—	—	—	—	—	—	BPI: Silver	19
"My Same"	2008	—	—	—	—	61	—	—	—	—	—		19
"Don't You Remember"	2011	—	—	—	—	—	—	—	—	—	—	BPI: Gold; MC: Gold; RMNZ: Platinum	21
"He Won't Go"	2011	—	—	—	—	—	—	—	—	—	—	BPI: Silver; RMNZ: Gold	21
"I'll Be Waiting"	2011	—	—	—	—	—	—	—	—	—	—	BPI: Silver	21
"One and Only"	2011	99	—	—	—	—	—	—	—	— (Note: "One and Only" did not enter the Billboard Hot 100, but peaked at number 10 on the Bubbling Under Hot 100 Singles chart.)	—	BPI: Gold; RMNZ: Platinum	21
"Lovesong"	2011	—	—	—	—	—	—	—	—	—	—	BPI: Silver; MC: Gold; RMNZ: Gold	21
"Take It All"	2011	—	—	—	—	—	—	—	—	—	—	BPI: Silver	21
"I Can't Make You Love Me"	2011	37	—	—	—	—	78	—	—	—	—		iTunes Festival: London 2011
"I Miss You"	2015	— (Note: "I Miss You" did not enter the UK Singles Chart, but peaked at number 76 on the UK Singles Downloads Chart.)	—	—	92	—	—	—	—	— (Note: "I Miss You" did not enter the Billboard Hot 100, but peaked at number 37 on the Digital Song Sales chart, a component of the main Hot 100.)	—	BPI: Silver; MC: Gold; RMNZ: Gold	25
"Remedy"	2015	145	94	69	47	83	—	— (Note: "Remedy" did not enter the Netherlands' Single Top 100 but peaked on the Netherlands' Single Tip Chart at number 29.)	30	87	—	BPI: Gold; MC: Platinum; RMNZ: Platinum	25
"River Lea"	2015	—	—	—	80	97	—	—	—	—	—	BPI: Silver; RMNZ: Gold	25
"Love in the Dark"	2015	76	—	— (Note: "Love in the Dark" did not enter the Billboard Canadian Hot 100, but peaked at number 33 on the Hot Canadian Digital Song Sales chart.)	39	79	24	65	—	— (Note: "Love in the Dark" did not enter the Billboard Hot 100, but peaked at number 11 on the Bubbling Under Hot 100 Singles chart.)	54	BPI: 2× Platinum; MC: Platinum; RMNZ: 2× Platinum	25
"Million Years Ago"	2015	64	84	97	42	74	94	— (Note: "Million Years Ago" did not enter the Netherlands' Single Top 100 but peaked on the Netherlands' Single Tip Chart at number 11.)	—	— (Note: "Million Years Ago" did not enter the Billboard Hot 100, but peaked at number 19 on the Bubbling Under Hot 100 Singles chart.)	—	BPI: Silver; MC: Platinum; RMNZ: Gold	25
"All I Ask"	2015	41	65	— (Note: "All I Ask" did not enter the Billboard Canadian Hot 100, but peaked at number 34 on the Hot Canadian Digital Song Sales chart.)	66	—	93	— (Note: "All I Ask" did not enter the Netherlands' Single Top 100 but peaked on the Netherlands' Single Tip Chart at number eight.)	—	77	110	BPI: Platinum; MC: 2× Platinum; RMNZ: 2× Platinum	25
"Sweetest Devotion"	2015	—	—	—	159	—	—	—	—	— (Note: "Sweetest Devotion" did not enter the Billboard Hot 100, but peaked at number 24 on the Bubbling Under Hot 100 Singles chart.)	—		25
"Strangers by Nature"	2021	— (Note: "Strangers by Nature" did not enter the UK Singles Chart, but peaked at number 9 on the UK Streaming Chart.)	18	22	67	—	—	—	— (Note: "Strangers by Nature" did not enter the Swiss Singles chart, but charted at number 21 on the Swiss Hitparade Streaming chart.)	41	18		30
"My Little Love"	2021	— (Note: "My Little Love" did not enter the UK Singles Chart, but peaked at number 5 on the UK Streaming Chart.)	11	14	66	—	—	14	— (Note: "My Little Love" did not enter the Swiss Singles chart, but charted at number 18 on the Swiss Hitparade Streaming chart.)	23	12	BPI: Silver; RMNZ: Gold	30
"Cry Your Heart Out"	2021	— (Note: "Cry Your Heart Out" did not enter the UK Singles Chart, but peaked at number 10 on the UK Streaming Chart.)	21	24	92	—	—	—	— (Note: "Cry Your Heart Out" did not enter the Swiss Singles chart, but charted at number 26 on the Swiss Hitparade Streaming chart.)	44	21		30
"Can I Get It"	2021	— (Note: "Can I Get It" did not enter the UK Singles Chart, but peaked at number 7 on the UK Streaming Chart.)	15	11	71	—	—	—	14	26	13	BPI: Silver; ARIA: Gold; RMNZ: Gold	30
"All Night Parking" (with Erroll Garner)	2021	— (Note: "All Night Parking" did not enter the UK Singles Chart, but peaked at number 20 on the UK Streaming Chart.)	33	28	144	—	—	—	— (Note: "All Night Parking" did not enter the Swiss Singles chart, but charted at number 36 on the Swiss Hitparade Streaming chart.)	53	27		30
"Woman like Me"	2021	— (Note: "Woman like Me" did not enter the UK Singles Chart, but peaked at number 21 on the UK Streaming Chart.)	—	29	147	—	—	—	— (Note: "Woman like Me" did not enter the Swiss Singles chart, but charted at number 38 on the Swiss Hitparade Streaming chart.)	55	28		30
"Hold On"	2021	— (Note: "Hold On" did not enter the UK Singles Chart, but peaked at number 14 on the UK Streaming Chart.)	31	26	151	—	—	—	— (Note: "Hold On" did not enter the Swiss Singles chart, but charted at number 39 on the Swiss Hitparade Streaming chart.)	49	25	BPI: Silver	30
"To Be Loved"	2021	— (Note: "To Be Loved" did not enter the UK Singles Chart, but peaked at number 12 on the UK Streaming Chart.)	25	16	116	—	—	—	— (Note: "To Be Loved" did not enter the Swiss Singles chart, but charted at number 32 on the Swiss Hitparade Streaming chart.)	32	19	BPI: Silver	30
"Love Is a Game"	2021	— (Note: "Love Is a Game" did not enter the UK Singles Chart, but peaked at number 26 on the UK Streaming Chart.)	—	37	188	—	—	—	— (Note: "Love Is a Game" did not enter the Swiss Singles chart, but charted at number 62 on the Swiss Hitparade Streaming chart.)	56	33	BPI: Silver	30
"—" denotes a song that did not chart or was not released in that territory.

== Music videos ==
List of music videos, showing year released and director
Title	Year	Director	Ref.
"Chasing Pavements"	2008	Mathew Cullen	
"Cold Shoulder"	2008	Phil Griffin	
"Make You Feel My Love"	2008	Mat Kirkby	
"Hometown Glory"	2009	Rocky Schenk	
"Rolling in the Deep"	2010	Sam Brown	
"Someone like You"	2011	Jake Nava	
"Hello"	2015	Xavier Dolan	
"Send My Love (To Your New Lover)"	2016	Patrick Daughters	
"Easy on Me"	2021	Xavier Dolan	
"Oh My God"	2022	Sam Brown	
"I Drink Wine"	2022	Joe Talbot	

== See also ==
- List of best-selling music artists
- List of best-selling female music artists in the United Kingdom
- List of Billboard Hot 100 chart achievements and milestones
- List of artists who have achieved simultaneous UK and US number-one hits
- List of artists who have achieved simultaneous number-one single and album in the United States
- List of artists who reached number one on the UK Singles Chart
- List of artists who reached number one on the U.S. Dance Club Songs chart
- List of artists who reached number one in the United States

== Footnotes ==
Notes for albums and songs

Notes for peak chart positions
