= Adele Live 2016–2017 =

2016–17 concert tour by Adele

Adele Live 2016
- Tour by Adele
- Promotional poster for the tour
- Location: Europe • Oceania • North America
- Associated album: 25
- Start date: 29 February 2016
- End date: 29 June 2017
- Legs: 4
- No. of shows: 51 in Europe; 58 in North America; 11 in Oceania; 121 in total
- Attendance: 2.480 million (120 shows)
- Box office: $278.4 million (120 shows)($365.67 million in 2025 dollars)

Adele concert chronology
- Adele Live (2011); Adele Live 2016 (2016–17); Weekends with Adele (2022–24)

Adele Live 2016 (titled as Adele Live 2017 for the shows in 2017) was the third concert tour by English singer-songwriter Adele in support of her third studio album, 25. It began on 29 February 2016, in Belfast, Northern Ireland at the SSE Arena, continued throughout Western Europe, North America and Oceania. It was originally scheduled to conclude on 2 July 2017, in London, England, at Wembley Stadium, however on 30 June Adele announced via social media that she had regretfully cancelled her final two performances upon medical advice due to vocal injuries.

== Background and commercial reception ==
Adele announced the Western European headlining dates on 26 November 2015. After tickets went on sale on 4 December, many venues reported sell-outs, resulting in extra dates being added in multiple cities on the itinerary. Tickets sold out nearly instantaneously, with promoters for Glasgow's SSE Hydro reporting that tickets for the 13,000 venue sold out within two minutes. Due to the high demand, online queues were set up, which resulted in queues of over 50,000 people for venues only seating a quarter of that.

On 14 December 2015, Adele announced the North American leg of the tour, which included six nights at Madison Square Garden and eight nights at Staples Center. Adele broke Taylor Swift's five-show record for most consecutive sold-out shows at Staples Center. Ten million people tried to buy tickets to the North American leg of Adele's world tour; only 750,000 tickets were available.

On 18 March 2016, Adele confirmed rumours that she would be headlining Glastonbury Festival 2016, on 25 June. She was the fourth solo female to perform a headline set at the festival, and the first on a Saturday. Adele confirmed the news live on stage at The O_{2} Arena, in London.

In July 2016, Pollstar released its 2016 Mid Year Special featuring the top-grossing tours of the year so far. Adele was announced as the sixth highest-grossing worldwide act of 2016 so far, with ticket sales of $75.9 million and 709,498 tickets sold from the 49 shows of the European leg of her tour. Billboard reported that overall based on tickets sold through the first week of October 2016 the tour had sold in the $150 million range and that the total gross from the first 15 venues of the North American leg of tour was $67,599,098 with 601,195 tickets sold from 5 July to 7 October 2016.

The tour's Australian dates were announced on 15 November 2016; Adele would perform a series of special stadium concerts in market's five big cities in February and March 2017. A New Zealand show was announced on 18 November 2016. Her first two shows in New Zealand sold out in record-breaking 23 minutes, and a third show was announced, with all tickets sold in under 30 minutes. As of January 2017, over 600,000 tickets have been sold for the tour's Australian concerts.

According to StubHub, a ticket resale site, the tour ranked the most popular concert tour of 2016. Her show in 2016 ranked at No. 5 on Pollstar's annual Year-End Top Worldwide Tours chart with $167.7 million, and her show in 2017 ranked at No. 30 on Pollstar's annual Year-End Top Worldwide Tours chart with $59 million grossed and 600,000 tickets sold.

Adele performed to her largest audience on tour, both in terms of the amount in a single shows, as well as overall for one city, with her two concerts at Sydney's ANZ Stadium, which attracted 95,544 people per concert. This is also the largest audience the venue has seen since the 2000 Sydney Olympics, breaking Taylor Swift's 2015 record of 75,980 audience members. The show was so packed that it caused huge public transport delays all around the city and both shows were delayed by up to 45 minutes to allow attendees more time to arrive at the concert.

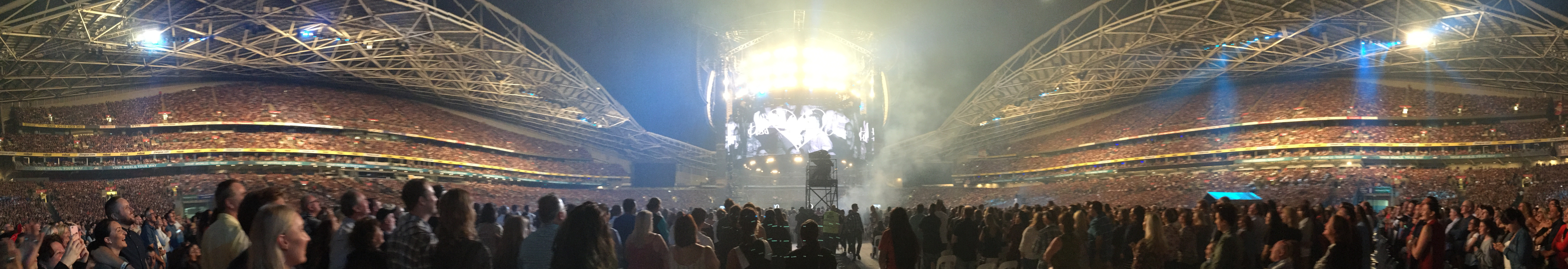
A panorama of ANZ Stadium during Adele's second Sydney show on March 11, 2017

== Critical reception ==
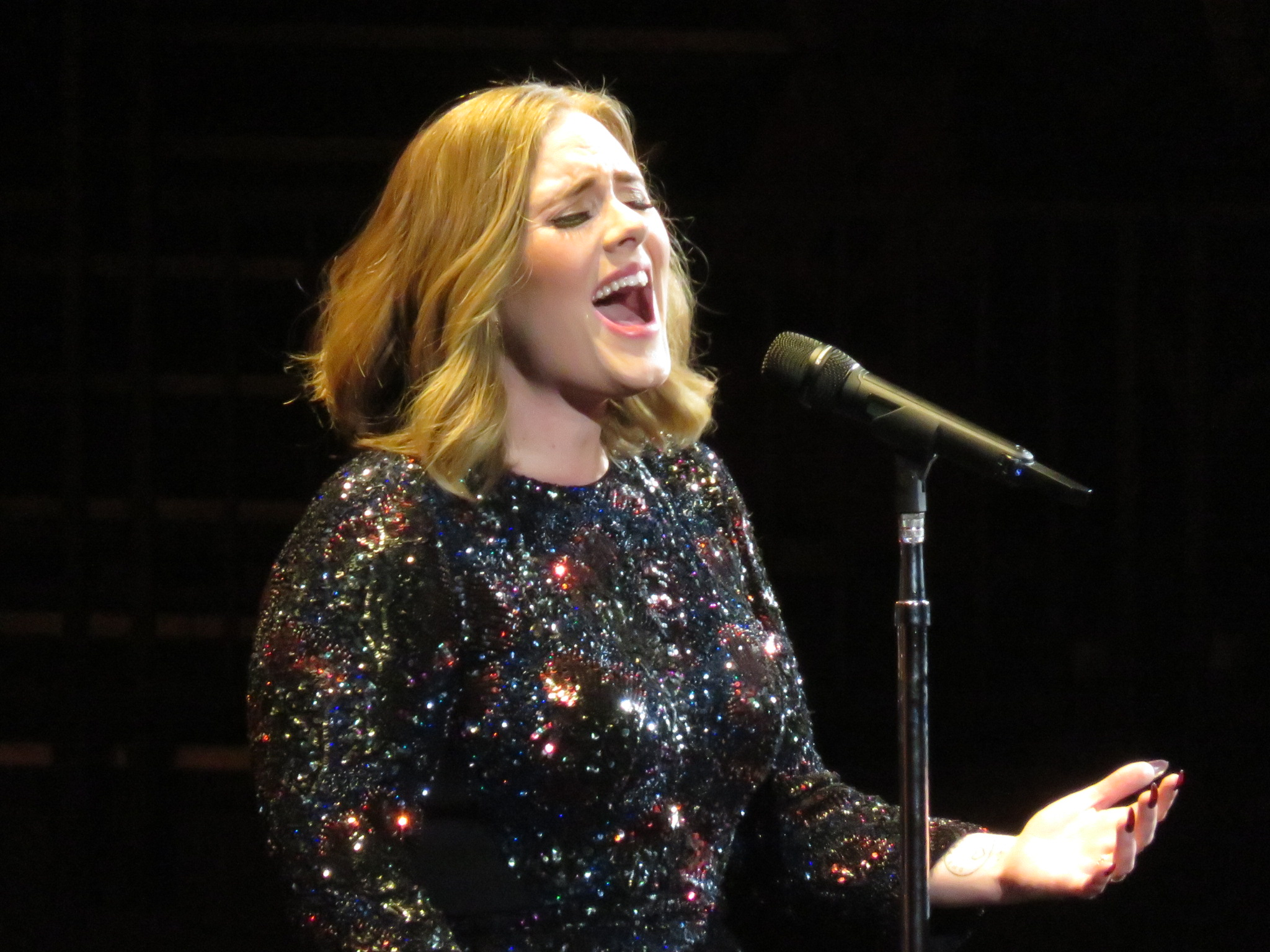
Adele at the Genting Arena, March 2016

The UK tour received rave reviews from music critics. Bernadette McNulty of The Daily Telegraph gave the opening show at The SSE Arena Belfast five stars. She referenced the expensive secondary market ticket prices for the tour, saying that "Adele is worth every penny". McNulty states that "Adele undoubtedly has the popularity to fill endless arenas, but maintaining the attention of thousands of people used to the hi-tech extravaganzas laid on by the likes of Taylor Swift and Beyoncé can demand more flashing lights, dance routines and hydraulics than any natural talent. Her entrance was certainly theatrical, emerging from the centre of the arena underneath a main stage flanked by an Orwellian projection of her giant eyes blinking. But between that and some virtual, or possibly in Belfast real, rain, Adele kept it remarkably and effectively simple, letting nothing get in the way of what was almost a religious communion with her fans." BBC News music reporter Mark Savage said that "Adele enjoyed a rapturous reception as she opened her world tour with an intimate arena show in Belfast." Continuing his positive review, he said "even the steeliest of hearts would have been forced to concede she had brought the goods." Amanda Ferguson from the Belfast Telegraph said that "Adele is fun, charismatic and exceptionally talented" in her four star review. Alexis Petridis of The Guardian opened his review by saying that Adele "delivers a solid - if unsurprising - show on the first night of her tour". In his four star review, Petridis noted Adele saying "I know some of you have been dragged along here tonight but I'm going to win you over", before concluding that "judging by the reaction as she finally disappears - on the same platform on which she appeared - she has managed it." Nick Hasted of The Independent gave the show three stars, saying that "she tries soul moves over gospel piano, but owes more to Shirley Bassey than Aretha". Giving a mostly positive review, Hasted concluded the review by saying "Adele needs the nerve to make a defining leap, to become the bawdy, ballsy person she is on stage when she writes. Pop is dying for it."

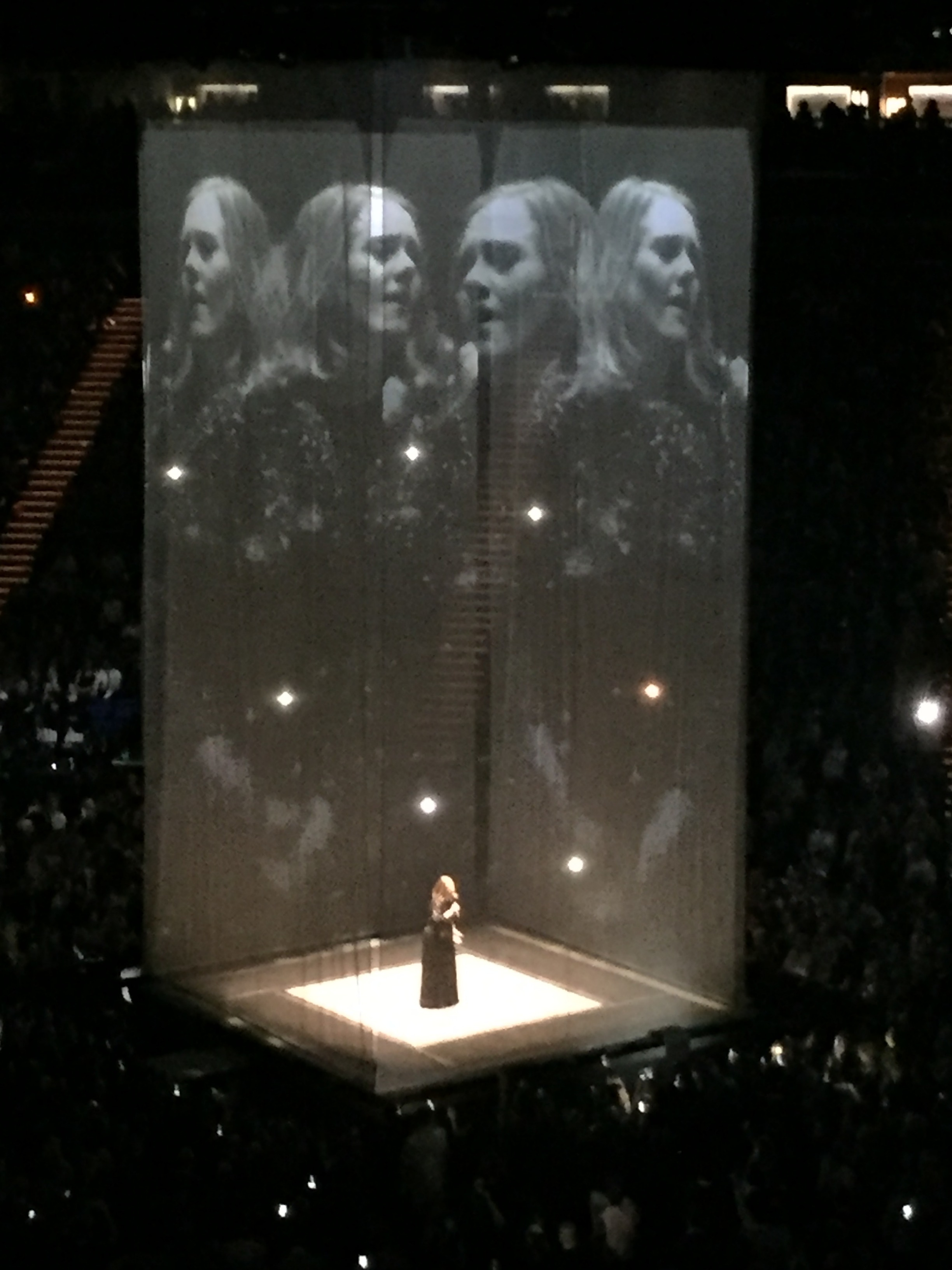
Adele performing "Someone like You" at the O2 Arena in London, March 2016

The critical response was overwhelmingly positive when Adele performed six shows at The O_{2} Arena in her hometown, London. The Huffington Post's Ashley Percival gave one of the shows five stars: "By her own admission, most of her back catalogue is "fucking miserable", and I questioned quite how the Tottenham-born songstress would hold the attention of the packed O_{2} Arena without being able to rely on exhaustive dance routines or belting out some pop bangers to boost the energy. But the second she emerged through the floor of a small B-stage uttering those immortal words "Hello, it's me", any concerns just evaporated — every single person in the room was in complete awe, and would stay that way for the entirety of the 18-song set." David Smyth from the London Evening Standard said that "Adele shifted constantly from being a lightning rod for emotion to a light entertainer" in his four star review. He also complimented the show's opening performance of "Hello", saying that "isolated, with her large band hidden behind the screen, [Adele] held the room without trickery — just one of the great singing voices." Ludovic Hunter-Tilney from the Financial Times stated in his four star review that the show "had an old-school air of professionalism, sumptuously mounted and impeccably rehearsed." Hunter-Tilney also said that "Flashy special effects were kept to a minimum, such as the downfall of water that surrounded her for "Set Fire to the Rain" towards the end. The absence of high-tech arena spectacle helped the show. It allowed Adele's personality to gain the upper hand over her professionalism." Adele performed in the Genting Arena, Birmingham on 29, 30 March and 1, 2 April 2016 in a performance described as "mesmerizing", "jaw-dropping" and "breath-taking".

Billboard's Chris Willman took aim at previous reviewers of the tour who had criticised Adele for speaking too much during the concert in his positive review of the opening night of her stint at Los Angeles' Staples Center. He said "A few critics at the earliest stops on her first U.S. arena tour have made "shut up and sing"-type suggestions… a would-be corrective measure that's unlikely to be wished for by almost any of her actual fans, who surely recognize that they're in the presence of not just one of the great singers in pop history, but one of the great broads."

Adele's first performance in Australia at the Domain Stadium in Perth was met with universally positive reviews. Heather McNeill of The Sydney Morning Herald said Adele "was noticeably humbled by the massive crowd [the largest in West Australian concert history], admitting in her first many witty and warm chats with fans that she was a bit nervous." She named "I'll Be Waiting", "Rumour Has It" and "Water Under the Bridge" as highlights calling them "flawless" and "soulful", as well as "Sweetest Devotion" and "Take It All". McNeill gave the concert five stars. Simon Collins of The West Australian gave the concert four stars, claiming that "for many people, Adele's first ever Australian show and first ever stadium concert will be the best they have ever seen." He said that whilst "for many people, this was a five-star concert", for him "not so much...but like all that confetti after the show, I've been swept up in Adele fever." He concluded that "the once-in-a-generation artist and unique, yet down-to-earth, personality had left Perth fans both starstruck and with a brand new bestie." In a review for The Guardian, Bob Gordon claims that "Perth was entranced and besotted by Adele a full 48 hours before her show" so that "by showtime, gridlock or not, Perth was fit to pop."

== Setlist ==
=== 2016 ===
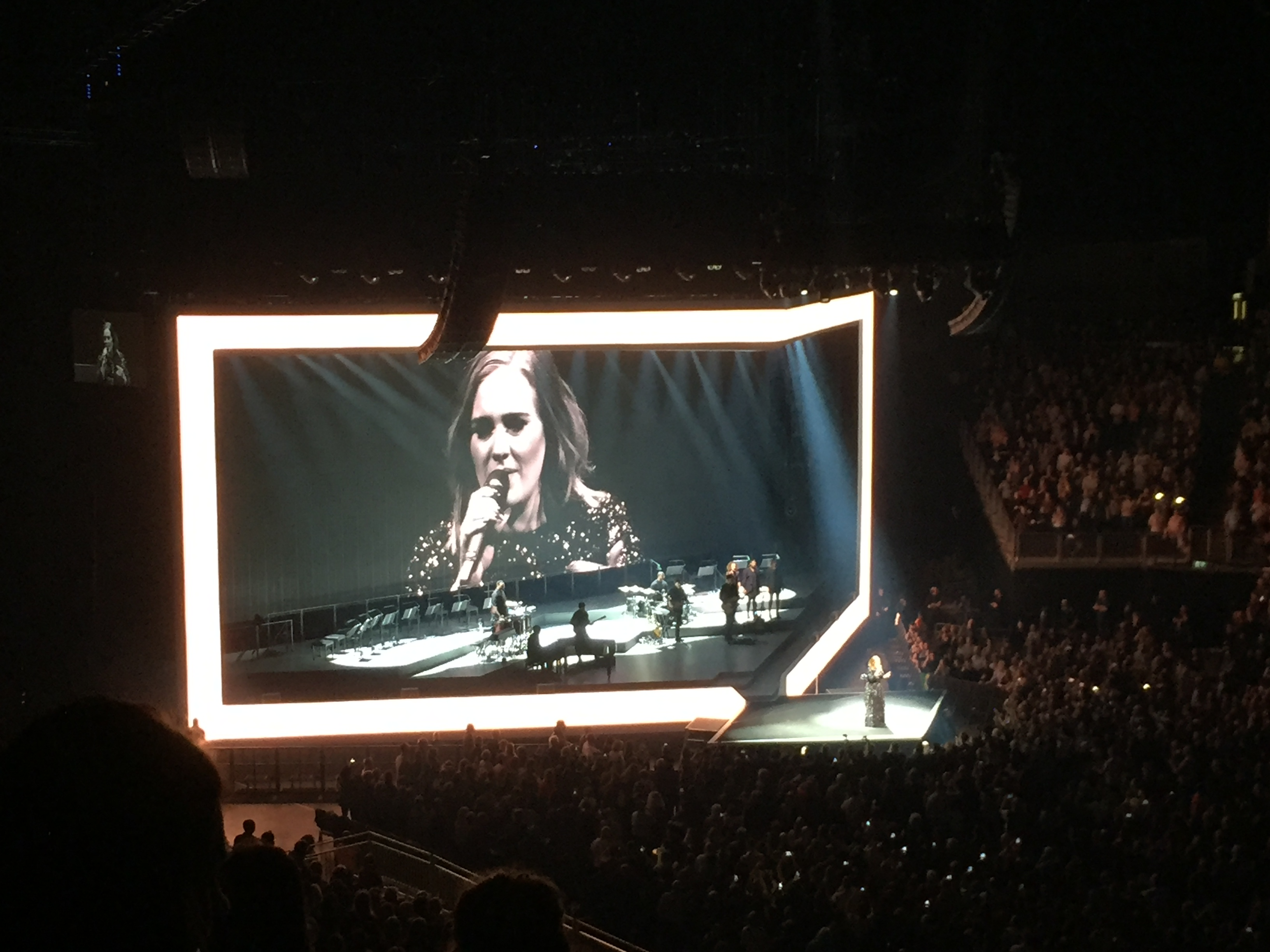
Adele at the O2 Arena in London, March 2016

This setlist is representative of the 29 February 2016 concert, in Belfast. It may not represent all concerts for the duration of the 2016 tour.

1. "Hello"
2. "Hometown Glory"
3. "One and Only"
4. "Rumour Has It"
5. "Water Under the Bridge"
6. "I Miss You"
7. "Skyfall"
8. "Million Years Ago"
9. "Don't You Remember"
10. "Send My Love (To Your New Lover)"
11. "Make You Feel My Love"
12. "Sweetest Devotion"
13. "Chasing Pavements"
14. "Someone like You"
15. "Set Fire to the Rain"
  Encore
16. "All I Ask"
17. "When We Were Young"
18. "Rolling in the Deep"

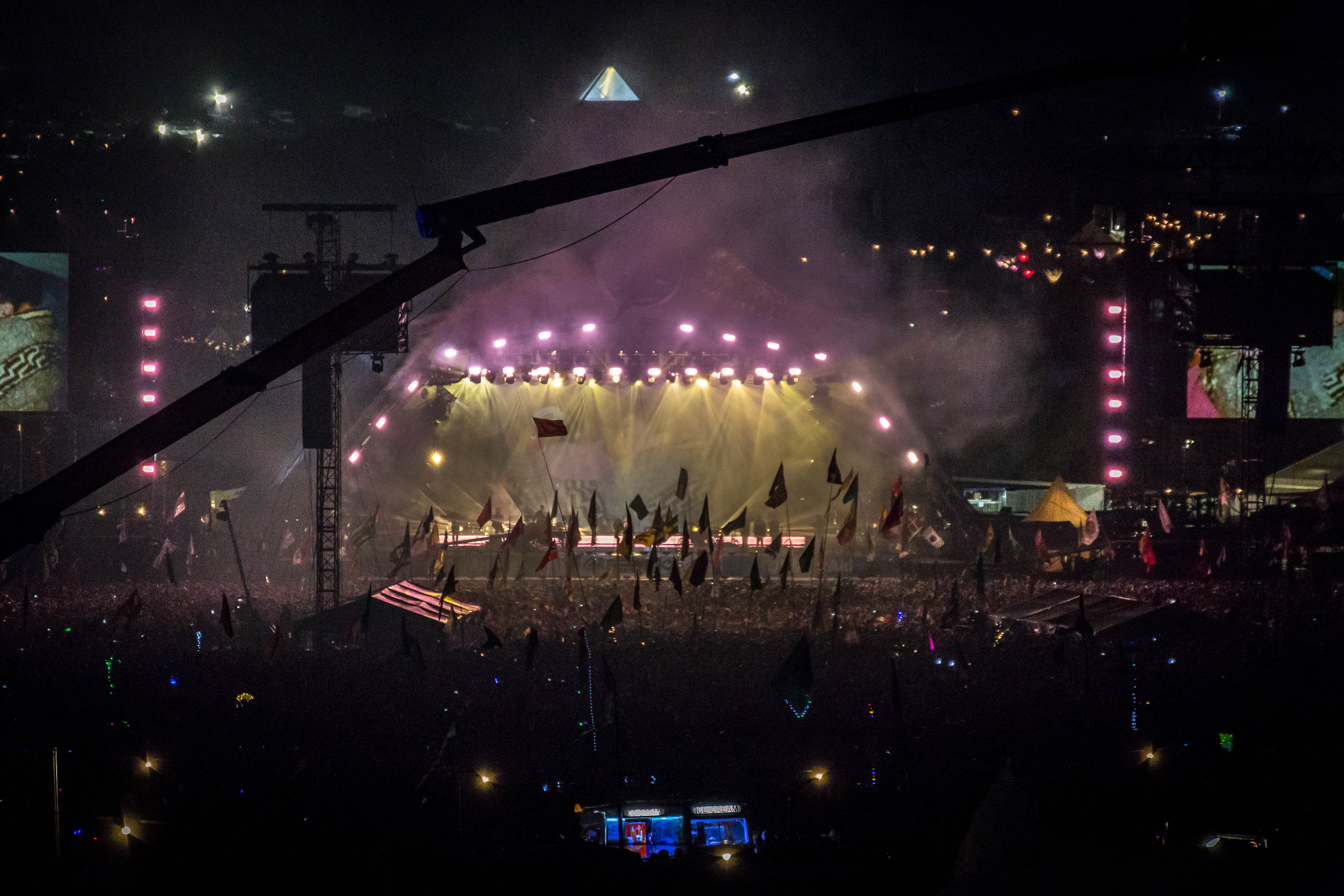
Adele on the Pyramid Stage at Glastonbury in 2016.

=== Glastonbury Festival ===
Her performance at Glastonbury included:

1. "Hello"
2. "Rumour Has It"
3. "I'll Be Waiting"
4. "One and Only"
5. "Water Under the Bridge"
6. "Skyfall"
7. "Hometown Glory"
8. "Don't You Remember"
9. "Send My Love (To Your New Lover)"
10. "River Lea"
11. "Rolling in the Deep"
12. "Make You Feel My Love"
13. "Set Fire to the Rain"
  Encore
14. "When We Were Young"
15. "Someone like You"

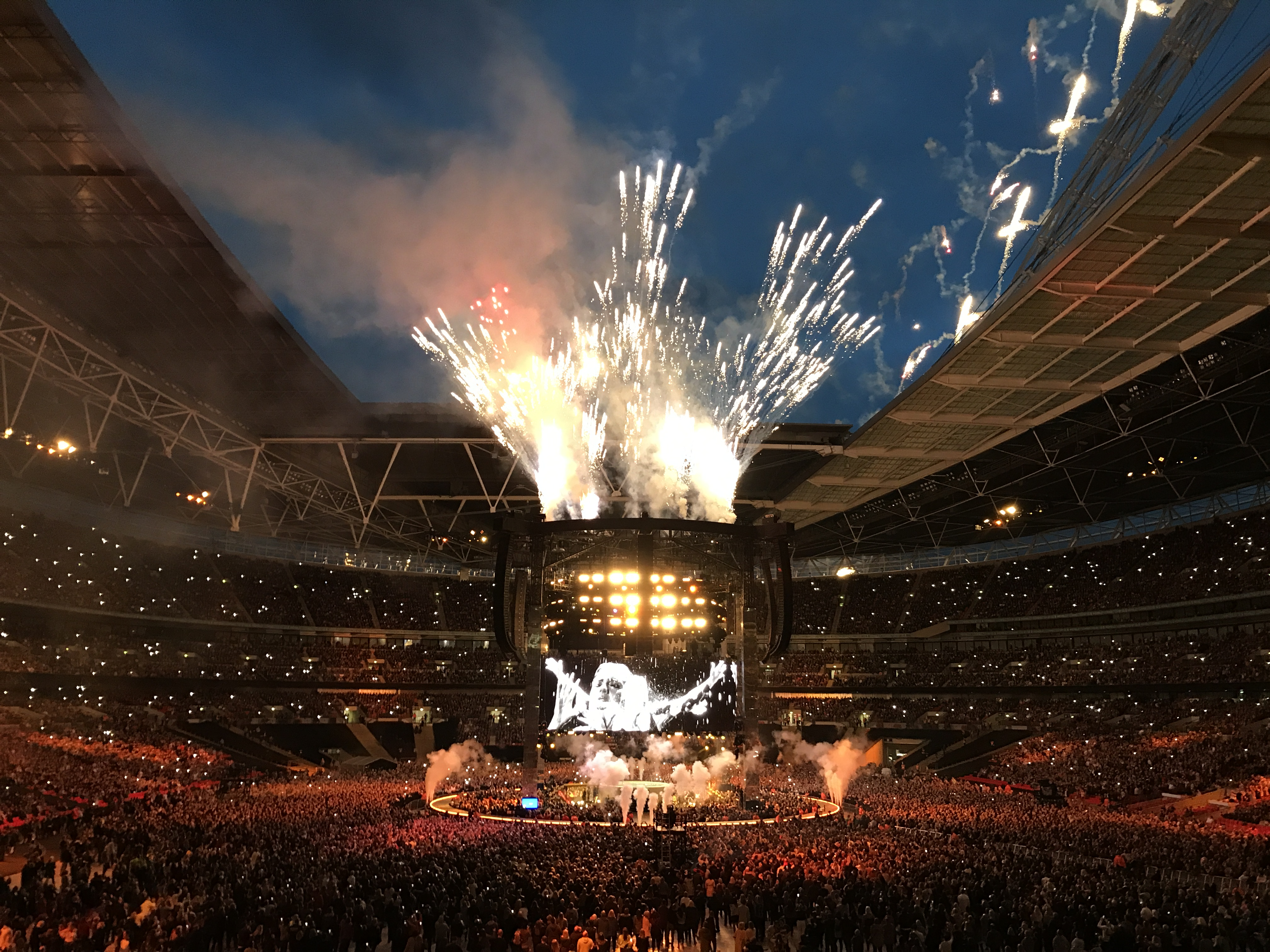
Adele performing "Set Fire to the Rain" at Wembley Stadium, June 2017. Her concert was attended by 98,000 fans, a stadium record for a UK music event.

2017

Stadium Shows

1. Hello
2. Hometown Glory
3. One and Only
4. I'll Be Waiting
5. Rumour Has It
6. Water Under the Bridge
7. I Miss You
8. Skyfall
9. Don't You Remember
10. Make You Feel My Love
11. Send My Love (To Your New Lover)
12. Sweetest Devotion
13. Chasing Pavements
14. Take It All
15. Set Fire to the Rain Encore
16. When We Were Young
17. Rolling in the Deep
18. Someone Like You

== Shows ==
List of 2016 concerts, showing date, city, country, venue, tickets sold, number of available tickets, and amount of gross revenue
| Date (2016) | City | Country | Venue | Attendance | Revenue |
|---|---|---|---|---|---|
| 29 February | Belfast | Northern Ireland | SSE Arena | 21,593 / 21,593 | $2,326,160 |
| 1 March | Belfast | Northern Ireland | SSE Arena | 21,593 / 21,593 | $2,326,160 |
| 4 March | Dublin | Ireland | 3Arena | 25,290 / 25,290 | $2,617,060 |
| 5 March | Dublin | Ireland | 3Arena | 25,290 / 25,290 | $2,617,060 |
| 7 March | Manchester | England | Manchester Arena | 63,209 / 63,209 | $7,243,160 |
| 8 March | Manchester | England | Manchester Arena | 63,209 / 63,209 | $7,243,160 |
| 10 March | Manchester | England | Manchester Arena | 63,209 / 63,209 | $7,243,160 |
| 11 March | Manchester | England | Manchester Arena | 63,209 / 63,209 | $7,243,160 |
| 15 March | London | England | The O_{2} Arena | 126,043 / 126,043 (Note: The score data is combined from the shows held at The O_{2} Arena from 15, 16, 18, 19, 21, 22 March & 4, 5 April 2016 respectively.) | $14,759,300 |
| 16 March | London | England | The O_{2} Arena | 126,043 / 126,043 | $14,759,300 |
| 18 March | London | England | The O_{2} Arena | 126,043 / 126,043 | $14,759,300 |
| 19 March | London | England | The O_{2} Arena | 126,043 / 126,043 | $14,759,300 |
| 21 March | London | England | The O_{2} Arena | 126,043 / 126,043 | $14,759,300 |
| 22 March | London | England | The O_{2} Arena | 126,043 / 126,043 | $14,759,300 |
| 25 March | Glasgow | Scotland | SSE Hydro | 22,292 / 22,292 | $2,410,390 |
| 26 March | Glasgow | Scotland | SSE Hydro | 22,292 / 22,292 | $2,410,390 |
| 29 March | Birmingham | England | Genting Arena | 52,562 / 52,562 | $6,426,580 |
| 30 March | Birmingham | England | Genting Arena | 52,562 / 52,562 | $6,426,580 |
| 1 April | Birmingham | England | Genting Arena | 52,562 / 52,562 | $6,426,580 |
| 2 April | Birmingham | England | Genting Arena | 52,562 / 52,562 | $6,426,580 |
| 4 April | London | England | The O_{2} Arena | | |
| 5 April | London | England | The O_{2} Arena | | |
| 29 April | Stockholm | Sweden | Tele2 Arena | 30,772 / 30,772 | $2,406,130 |
| 1 May | Oslo | Norway | Telenor Arena | 21,005 / 21,005 | $1,785,430 |
| 3 May | Copenhagen | Denmark | Forum Copenhagen | 9,907 / 9,907 | $1,146,490 |
| 4 May | Herning | Denmark | Jyske Bank Boxen | 12,123 / 12,123 | $1,430,260 |
| 7 May | Berlin | Germany | Mercedes-Benz Arena | 23,798 / 23,798 | $2,319,340 |
| 8 May | Berlin | Germany | Mercedes-Benz Arena | 23,798 / 23,798 | $2,319,340 |
| 10 May | Hamburg | Germany | Barclaycard Arena | 23,267 / 23,267 | $2,343,370 |
| 11 May | Hamburg | Germany | Barclaycard Arena | 23,267 / 23,267 | $2,343,370 |
| 14 May | Cologne | Germany | Lanxess Arena | 29,119 / 29,119 | $2,734,650 |
| 15 May | Cologne | Germany | Lanxess Arena | 29,119 / 29,119 | $2,734,650 |
| 17 May | Zürich | Switzerland | Hallenstadion | 26,480 / 26,480 | $2,730,090 |
| 18 May | Zürich | Switzerland | Hallenstadion | 26,480 / 26,480 | $2,730,090 |
| 21 May | Lisbon | Portugal | MEO Arena | 36,081 / 36,081 | $2,692,990 |
| 22 May | Lisbon | Portugal | MEO Arena | 36,081 / 36,081 | $2,692,990 |
| 24 May | Barcelona | Spain | Palau Sant Jordi | 31,075 / 31,075 | $2,858,760 |
| 25 May | Barcelona | Spain | Palau Sant Jordi | 31,075 / 31,075 | $2,858,760 |
| 28 May | Verona | Italy | Arena di Verona | 25,512 / 25,512 | $2,008,990 |
| 29 May | Verona | Italy | Arena di Verona | 25,512 / 25,512 | $2,008,990 |
| 1 June | Amsterdam | Netherlands | Ziggo Dome | 51,777 / 51,777 | $4,810,120 |
| 3 June | Amsterdam | Netherlands | Ziggo Dome | 51,777 / 51,777 | $4,810,120 |
| 4 June | Amsterdam | Netherlands | Ziggo Dome | 51,777 / 51,777 | $4,810,120 |
| 6 June | Amsterdam | Netherlands | Ziggo Dome | 51,777 / 51,777 | $4,810,120 |
| 9 June | Paris | France | AccorHotels Arena | 26,113 / 26,113 | $2,798,970 |
| 10 June | Paris | France | AccorHotels Arena | 26,113 / 26,113 | $2,798,970 |
| 12 June | Antwerp | Belgium | Sportpaleis | 52,130 / 52,130 | $5,713,100 |
| 13 June | Antwerp | Belgium | Sportpaleis | 52,130 / 52,130 | $5,713,100 |
| 15 June | Antwerp | Belgium | Sportpaleis | 52,130 / 52,130 | $5,713,100 |
| 25 June (Note: The concert of 25 June 2016 in Pilton, England at Worthy Farm is a part of Glastonbury Festival.) | Pilton | England | Worthy Farm | —N/a | —N/a |
| 5 July | Saint Paul | United States | Xcel Energy Center | 30,685 / 30,685 | $3,376,247 |
| 6 July | Saint Paul | United States | Xcel Energy Center | 30,685 / 30,685 | $3,376,247 |
| 10 July | Chicago | United States | United Center | 45,635 / 45,635 | $5,074,208 |
| 11 July | Chicago | United States | United Center | 45,635 / 45,635 | $5,074,208 |
| 13 July | Chicago | United States | United Center | 45,635 / 45,635 | $5,074,208 |
| 16 July | Denver | United States | Pepsi Center | 27,313 / 27,313 | $2,999,334 |
| 17 July | Denver | United States | Pepsi Center | 27,313 / 27,313 | $2,999,334 |
| 20 July | Vancouver | Canada | Rogers Arena | 28,959 / 28,959 | $3,238,209 |
| 21 July | Vancouver | Canada | Rogers Arena | 28,959 / 28,959 | $3,238,209 |
| 25 July | Seattle | United States | KeyArena | 25,003 / 25,003 | $2,890,817 |
| 26 July | Seattle | United States | KeyArena | 25,003 / 25,003 | $2,890,817 |
| 30 July | San Jose | United States | SAP Center | 28,002 / 28,002 | $3,224,583 |
| 31 July | San Jose | United States | SAP Center | 28,002 / 28,002 | $3,224,583 |
| 2 August | Oakland | United States | Oracle Arena | 14,577 / 14,577 | $1,722,672 |
| 5 August | Los Angeles | United States | Staples Center | 118,149 / 118,149 (Note: The score data is combined from the shows held at the Staples Center from 5, 6, 9, 10, 12, 13, 20, 21 August 2016 respectively.) | $13,821,741 |
| 6 August | Los Angeles | United States | Staples Center | 118,149 / 118,149 | $13,821,741 |
| 9 August | Los Angeles | United States | Staples Center | 118,149 / 118,149 | $13,821,741 |
| 10 August | Los Angeles | United States | Staples Center | 118,149 / 118,149 | $13,821,741 |
| 12 August | Los Angeles | United States | Staples Center | 118,149 / 118,149 | $13,821,741 |
| 13 August | Los Angeles | United States | Staples Center | 118,149 / 118,149 | $13,821,741 |
| 16 August | Phoenix | United States | Talking Stick Resort Arena | 14,166 / 14,166 | $1,573,459 |
| 20 August | Los Angeles | United States | Staples Center | | |
| 21 August | Los Angeles | United States | Staples Center | | |
| 6 September | Auburn Hills | United States | The Palace of Auburn Hills | 28,812 / 28,812 | $3,007,199 |
| 7 September | Auburn Hills | United States | The Palace of Auburn Hills | 28,812 / 28,812 | $3,007,199 |
| 9 September | Philadelphia | United States | Wells Fargo Center | 31,251 / 31,251 | $3,698,133 |
| 10 September | Philadelphia | United States | Wells Fargo Center | 31,251 / 31,251 | $3,698,133 |
| 14 September | Boston | United States | TD Garden | 27,183 / 27,183 | $3,022,975 |
| 15 September | Boston | United States | TD Garden | 27,183 / 27,183 | $3,022,975 |
| 19 September | New York City | United States | Madison Square Garden | 86,652 / 86,652 | $9,829,597 |
| 20 September | New York City | United States | Madison Square Garden | 86,652 / 86,652 | $9,829,597 |
| 22 September | New York City | United States | Madison Square Garden | 86,652 / 86,652 | $9,829,597 |
| 23 September | New York City | United States | Madison Square Garden | 86,652 / 86,652 | $9,829,597 |
| 25 September | New York City | United States | Madison Square Garden | 86,652 / 86,652 | $9,829,597 |
| 26 September | New York City | United States | Madison Square Garden | 86,652 / 86,652 | $9,829,597 |
| 30 September | Montreal | Canada | Bell Centre | 32,155 / 32,155 | $3,370,793 |
| 1 October | Montreal | Canada | Bell Centre | 32,155 / 32,155 | $3,370,793 |
| 3 October | Toronto | Canada | Air Canada Centre | 62,653 / 62,653 | $6,749,131 |
| 4 October | Toronto | Canada | Air Canada Centre | 62,653 / 62,653 | $6,749,131 |
| 6 October | Toronto | Canada | Air Canada Centre | 62,653 / 62,653 | $6,749,131 |
| 7 October | Toronto | Canada | Air Canada Centre | 62,653 / 62,653 | $6,749,131 |
| 10 October | Washington, D.C. | United States | Verizon Center | 29,043 / 29,043 | $3,279,706 |
| 11 October | Washington, D.C. | United States | Verizon Center | 29,043 / 29,043 | $3,279,706 |
| 15 October | Nashville | United States | Bridgestone Arena | 26,434 / 26,434 | $2,828,954 |
| 16 October | Nashville | United States | Bridgestone Arena | 26,434 / 26,434 | $2,828,954 |
| 25 October | Miami | United States | American Airlines Arena | 27,906 / 27,906 | $3,199,011 |
| 26 October | Miami | United States | American Airlines Arena | 27,906 / 27,906 | $3,199,011 |
| 28 October | Atlanta | United States | Philips Arena | 26,507 / 26,507 | $2,924,777 |
| 29 October | Atlanta | United States | Philips Arena | 26,507 / 26,507 | $2,924,777 |
| 1 November | Dallas | United States | American Airlines Center | 27,823 /27,823 | $3,143,958 |
| 2 November | Dallas | United States | American Airlines Center | 27,823 /27,823 | $3,143,958 |
| 4 November | Austin | United States | Frank Erwin Center | 25,267 / 25,267 | $2,725,292 |
| 5 November | Austin | United States | Frank Erwin Center | 25,267 / 25,267 | $2,725,292 |
| 8 November | Houston | United States | Toyota Center | 25,577 / 25,577 | $3,032,246 |
| 9 November | Houston | United States | Toyota Center | 25,577 / 25,577 | $3,032,246 |
| 14 November | Mexico City | Mexico | Palacio de los Deportes | 34,585 / 34,585 | $3,259,064 |
| 15 November | Mexico City | Mexico | Palacio de los Deportes | 34,585 / 34,585 | $3,259,064 |
| 21 November (Note: The second concert in Phoenix was originally scheduled to take place on 17 August 2016, but was rescheduled due to illness.) | Phoenix | United States | Talking Stick Resort Arena | 14,154 / 14,154 | $1,445,379 |

List of 2017 concerts, showing date, city, country, venue, tickets sold, number of available tickets, and amount of gross revenue
| Date (2017) | City | Country | Venue | Attendance | Revenue |
|---|---|---|---|---|---|
| 28 February | Perth | Australia | Domain Stadium | 65,000 / 65,000 | $91,336,180 |
| 4 March | Brisbane | Australia | The Gabba | 120,000 / 120,000 | $91,336,180 |
| 5 March | Brisbane | Australia | The Gabba | 120,000 / 120,000 | $91,336,180 |
| 10 March | Sydney | Australia | ANZ Stadium | 194,834 / 194,834 | $91,336,180 |
| 11 March | Sydney | Australia | ANZ Stadium | 194,834 / 194,834 | $91,336,180 |
| 13 March | Adelaide | Australia | Adelaide Oval | 70,000 / 70,000 | $91,336,180 |
| 18 March | Melbourne | Australia | Etihad Stadium | 152,300 / 152,300 | $91,336,180 |
| 19 March | Melbourne | Australia | Etihad Stadium | 152,300 / 152,300 | $91,336,180 |
| 23 March | Auckland | New Zealand | Mount Smart Stadium | 130,000 / 130,000 | $91,336,180 |
| 25 March | Auckland | New Zealand | Mount Smart Stadium | 130,000 / 130,000 | $91,336,180 |
| 26 March | Auckland | New Zealand | Mount Smart Stadium | 130,000 / 130,000 | $91,336,180 |
| 28 June | London | England | Wembley Stadium | 195,000 / 195,000 | $20,572,500 |
| 29 June | London | England | Wembley Stadium | 195,000 / 195,000 | $20,572,500 |
| Total | | | | 2,480,137 / 2,480,137 (100%) | $278,442,753 |

== Cancelled shows ==
List of cancelled concerts, showing date, city, country, venue, and reason for cancellation
| Date | City | Country | Venue | Reason |
|---|---|---|---|---|
| 1 July 2017 | London | England | Wembley Stadium | Vocal injury |
| 2 July 2017 | London | England | Wembley Stadium | Vocal injury |

== Personnel ==
- Adele – vocals
- Tim Van Der Kuil – guitars and musical director
- Amanda Brown – backing vocals
- Martine Celisca – backing vocals
- Katie Holmes-Smith – backing vocals
- Ben Thomas – guitars
- Aaron Draper – percussion
- Peter Randall – bass guitars
- Eric Wortham II – piano and keyboards
- Derrick Wright – drums
- Rosie Danvers – cello, leader of the wired strings, and horns
- Wired Strings – strings

== See also ==
- List of highest-grossing concert tours by women
