= I Drink Wine =

2022 single by Adele

- Live at the Brit Awards 2022 cover

Single by Adele

from the album 30
- Released: 4 November 2022
- Studio: No Expectations (Los Angeles, CA); The EastWood Scoring Stage (Burbank, CA)
- Genre: Gospel pop; soul pop
- Length: 6:16
- Label: Columbia
- Songwriters: Adele Adkins; Greg Kurstin
- Producer: Greg Kurstin

Adele singles chronology
"Oh My God" (2021)	"I Drink Wine" (2022)

Music video
- "I Drink Wine" on YouTube

"I Drink Wine" is a song by the English singer Adele from her fourth studio album, 30 (2021). Adele co-wrote the song with its producer, Greg Kurstin. It became available as the album's seventh track on 19 November 2021, when it was released by Columbia Records. It is a ballad with gospel influences reminiscent of church music and incorporates a piano and organ in its instrumentation. It is about letting go of one's ego and addresses Adele's divorce from Simon Konecki, comprising arduous realisations about the condition of her marriage and life.

"I Drink Wine" generally received positive reviews from music critics, some of whom viewed it as one of Adele's best songs and a career highlight. It reached the top 10 in the United Kingdom, Ireland, Iceland, New Zealand, South Africa, Australia, Canada, and Sweden and entered the charts in various other countries. Joe Talbot directed the music video for "I Drink Wine", which depicts Adele floating through a river and exploring a forest while drinking a glass of wine. Adele performed the song for her television specials and at the Brit Awards 2022, which was positively received. In addition, "I Drink Wine" impacted radio airplay in Italy on 4 November 2022 as the album's third single.

== Background ==
Adele began working on her fourth studio album in 2018. She filed for divorce from her husband, Simon Konecki, in September 2019, which inspired the album. Adele undertook therapy sessions after experiencing anxiety. The years following the divorce plagued her, especially due to the effect it had on her son. Adele decided to have regular conversations with him, which she recorded following advice from her therapist. These conversations inspired her to return to the studio, and the album took shape as a body of work that would explain to her son why she left his father. Adele released "Easy on Me" as the lead single from the album, entitled 30, on 14 October 2021.

Adele co-wrote the song "I Drink Wine" with its producer Greg Kurstin, who had produced three songs for her third studio album, 25 (2015) – "Hello", "Million Years Ago", and "Water Under the Bridge". She viewed "I Drink Wine" as reminiscent of the work of Elton John and Bernie Taupin and wrote it for herself and a friend during a time when she was taking things too personally. The song's lyrics were Adele's attempt to explain why she needed to mature to be more available in their friendship. Its first verse was inspired by an emotional six-hour conversation she had with James Corden while returning home from a shared family trip, in which he expressed being overpowered by "work stuff and the internet, and all those things". Originally 15 minutes long, the song was shortened upon her label's request: "Listen, everyone loves you, but no one's playing a 15-minute song on radio." Adele included a recording about moments of diffidence and a conversation about her remorse and relationship with remembrance in the final version, which a different friend had suggested she record.

Adele announced the album's tracklist on 1 November 2021, which included "I Drink Wine" as the seventh track. Upon the reveal, the song received attention on the Internet and began trending on Twitter, as fans speculated it was the track Adele had alluded to in an earlier interview with British Vogue: "Oh, that is destruction, It's me going out and getting drunk at a bar. Drinking liquor. I start arguments if I drink liquor. I can handle my wine, I could drink five bottles of wine and have a normal conversation." Variety's Chris Willman commented that it was "the track that Adele-aholics have already decided is their favorite; they don't even need to hear it, with that title. It won't be a letdown".

Adele revealed that three songs were in contention for release as the lead single, including one she described as "very sort of '70s, like piano, singer-songwriter-y, [with] a whole band on it, but just very Carpenters, like very Elton". Rolling Stone announced in November 2021 that "I Drink Wine" would be released as 30's second single. The song became available for digital download on 30, which was released on 19 November. "Oh My God" was eventually chosen as the second single instead. In October 2022, Billboard reported that "I Drink Wine" would be promoted as the third single from the album. The song was sent for radio airplay in Italy on 4 November 2022.

== Composition ==
I Drink Wine
A sample, in which Adele vocalizes stretched-out vowels over gospel-influenced piano instrumentation

"I Drink Wine" is six minutes and 16 seconds long. Kurstin produced and engineered the song. He plays the bass, mellotron, piano, Hammond organ, percussion, orchestron, and Rhodes, and David Campbell plays the strings. Randy Merrill mastered it, Matt Scatchell and Tom Elmhirst mixed it, and Steve Churchyard, Alex Pasco, and Julian Burg engineered it.

"I Drink Wine" is a ballad with gospel influences, southern soul piano, and organ instrumentation. The New York Times's Jon Pareles described the song as "churchy", and Pitchfork's Jillian Mapes called it "take-me-to-church chardonnay realness". Adele delivers her vocals with "soft, vowel-stretching cadences that pluck rhythms and rhymes out at will" on it. While singing the lyric "I'm trying to keep climbing up" on "I Drink Wine", her voice ascends in an upward arpeggio. Adele's voice escalates in the song's chorus, culminating in belting with a hint of grit in her low notes. It features "upward swirling piano and velvety vocals", according to The Independent's Annabel Nugent. "I Drink Wine" incorporates an introspective voice memo towards its climax. Critics compared the song to the work of John; Mapes described it as: "an Elton John-style barroom singalong with strong gospel undertones and an introspective voice memo at the end". The Guardian's Alexis Petridis thought it recalled Carole King, and Clash's Robin Murray considered it akin to ballads recorded by Tom Waits in the 1970s.

"I Drink Wine" has lyrics about letting go of one's ego. Adele directly addresses her separation from Konecki in the song. In its opening verse, she reminisces about her childhood and contemplates how she grew further away from herself. The lyrics of "I Drink Wine" discuss contrasting concepts, featuring some humorous lines and Adele asking herself tough questions. She admits to crying and reaches difficult realisations about her marriage and life. Adele concludes the song by wishing peace and happiness for her ex but maintains that separating from him was for the best: "Sometimes the road less travelled is a road best left behind." Willman described it as "a doozy of a marital postgame recap", and The Daily Telegraph's Neil McCormick likened it to "the transcription of a breakthrough session with a marriage guidance counsellor".

== Critical reception ==
"I Drink Wine" generally received positive reviews from music critics. Rolling Stone's Rob Sheffield called the song a "career highlight" for Adele: "What a song – one of the most ambitious feats she's ever attempted." Also from Rolling Stone, Brittany Spanos stated that it was one of the best songs of her already-legendary career: "a gorgeous power ballad that sees a pop deity come down to Earth". The magazine listed "I Drink Wine" as her third-best song ever and the 10th-best song of 2021, and its Australian edition included it at number nine. Pareles stated that Adele matched her emotion with a concentration on the song. The Line of Best Fit's David Cobbald thought it was more mature than her previous work, with its sense of edifying optimism over its gospel-inspired sound.

Gabrielle Sanchez of The A.V. Club thought Adele successfully expanded her sound with "I Drink Wine", delivering vocals that "run wild" and build up to purgative relief in the final chorus. Willman deemed the song's piano instrumentation more cheerful, "sweet and gospelly" than "Easy on Me". McCormick stated that the piano and organ were an ironically cheerful accompaniment to its sombre lyrics. Slant Magazine's Eric Mason thought "I Drink Wine" was excessively lengthy and unfit for pop radio. Though El Hunt of NME felt the song's title and gospel influences were promising, he concluded its "cheesy-sounding percussion transforms it into Savvy B: The Musical".

Kyle Mullin of Exclaim! thought the lyrics of "I Drink Wine" tersely communicate the seclusion of her unparalleled success. Murray positively reviewed the song's lyrics, describing them as a gaze into the remoteness of life in Los Angeles, where "even the simplest journey can find you trapped in gridlock – emotionally or otherwise". According to Mapes, its lyrics swarmed with clichés but largely prodigal and grounded, and she would be okay with its style of music soundtracking a future remake of 27 Dresses. Writing for The Los Angeles Times, Mikael Wood thought "I Drink Wine" could not deliver the foppish "millennials confession" its title promised. Writing for MusicOMH, Graeme Marsh opined that the song's lyrics projected mass appeal but not much else and dismissed it as a "'standard Adele' cut".

== Commercial performance ==
"I Drink Wine" debuted at its peak of number four on the UK Singles Chart issued on 26 November 2021 and received a Platinum certification from the British Phonographic Industry. The song charted at number 18 on the US Billboard Hot 100, and the Recording Industry Association of America certified it Gold. It peaked at number 10 on the Canadian Hot 100. In Australia, "I Drink Wine" reached number 10 and earned a Gold certification from the Australian Recording Industry Association. The song charted at number seven in New Zealand.

On the Billboard Global 200, "I Drink Wine" peaked at number 10. The song reached national record charts at number five in Ireland, number seven in Iceland, number eight in South Africa, number 10 in Sweden, number 18 in Norway, number 30 in the Netherlands, number 34 in Denmark, number 36 in Portugal, number 48 in Slovakia, number 55 in the Czech Republic, number 81 in France, Italy, number 95 in Spain, and number 96 in Croatia. It received a Platinum certification in Brazil.

== Music video ==
Joe Talbot directed the music video for "I Drink Wine". Adele appeared in a promotional video with NikkieTutorials in December 2021, where she described it as "fucking hilarious", and added that "it's the campiest thing you'll ever see, and I feel like everyone might be dressed up as Halloween for it next year". On 25 October 2022, she shared an eight-second teaser of the video, which shows someone playing the piano on a bridge while she floats on a boat under it, and announced that it would be released the following day. It premiered during an event called "Happy Hour with Adele" in West Hollywood, where Adele hosted a group of fans.

The video begins by displaying an old Hollywood-inspired title card. Clad in a gold Valentino gown, Adele grimaces at a couple while she floats, fills her glass with wine, and discards the empty bottle. She approaches a group of fishermen, including Kendrick Sampson, who tries to impress her and spins her around. Adele rejects him, and the synchronised swimmers accompanying her pull him away. She explores a forest, and the video concludes when the camera pulls away to reveal the video's set before Adele is shown floating in a pool alongside flowers. Vulture's Justin Curto stated that Adele was "at her best in the video" and "look[ed] glamorous". It was nominated for the MTV Video Music Award for Best Cinematography in 2023.

== Live performances ==
Adele performed "I Drink Wine" live for the first time during her CBS special Adele One Night Only (2021). She reprised the song for her ITV special An Audience with Adele (2021). On 8 February 2022, Adele sang it in a lime green chiffon Valentino gown at the Brit Awards 2022. In front of a gold curtain, she was accompanied by a four-piece band and three backup singers. Variety's Jem Aswad remarked it was "pitch-perfect, intense where it needed to be, with finger-pointing emphasis and a defiant grimace on the line, 'Why am I seeking approval from people I don't even know?'". Tomás Mier of Rolling Stone described the performance as an astonishing rendition and thought Adele undemandingly hit every note to perfection and looked stunning. Heran Mamo of Billboard stated she perched atop the piano "like it was her throne" and was elevated by her backup dancers clad in complementing shiny black outfits. She performed "I Drink Wine" during her British Summer Time concerts on 1 and 2 July 2022 and included it in the set list of her concert residency Weekends with Adele. Adele reprised the song with Corden for his final Carpool Karaoke episode, during which they got emotional and discussed his influence on it.

== Credits and personnel ==
Credits are adapted from the liner notes of 30.

- Greg Kurstin – producer, songwriter, engineering, bass, piano, mellotron, Hammond organ, percussion, orchestron, Rhodes
- Adele – songwriter
- David Campbell – strings
- Randy Merrill – mastering
- Matt Scatchell – mixing
- Tom Elmhirst – mixing
- Steve Churchyard – engineering
- Alex Pasco – engineering
- Julian Burg – engineering

== Charts ==
Chart positions for "I Drink Wine"
Chart (2021–2022)	Peak position
Australia (ARIA)	10
Canada Hot 100 (Billboard)	10
Croatia (HRT)	96
Czech Republic Singles Digital (ČNS IFPI)	55
Denmark (Tracklisten)	34
France (SNEP)	81
Global 200 (Billboard)	10
Iceland (Tónlistinn)	7
Ireland (IRMA)	5
Italy (FIMI)	81
Netherlands (Single Top 100)	30
New Zealand (Recorded Music NZ)	7
Norway (VG-lista)	18
Portugal (AFP)	36
San Marino (SMRRTV Top 50)	23
Slovakia (Singles Digitál Top 100)	48
South Africa (RISA)	8
Spain (Promusicae)	95
Sweden (Sverigetopplistan)	10
UK Singles (Official Charts)	4
US Billboard Hot 100	18

=== Year-end charts ===
Year-end chart performance for "I Drink Wine"
Chart (2023)	Position
Iceland (Tónlistinn)	88

== Certifications ==
Certifications for "I Drink Wine"
Region	Certification	Certified units/sales
Australia (ARIA)	Gold	35,000^{‡}
Brazil (Pro-Música Brasil)	Platinum	40,000^{‡}
Denmark (IFPI Danmark)	Gold	45,000^{‡}
France (SNEP)	Gold	100,000^{‡}
New Zealand (RMNZ)	Platinum	30,000^{‡}
Poland (ZPAV)	Gold	25,000^{‡}
United Kingdom (BPI)	Platinum	600,000^{‡}
United States (RIAA)	Gold	500,000^{‡}
^{‡} Sales+streaming figures based on certification alone.

== Release history ==
Release history for "I Drink Wine"
Region	Date	Format(s)	Label(s)	Ref.
Italy	4 November 2022	Radio airplay	Sony	
