= Weekends with Adele =

2022–2024 concert residency by Adele

- Residency by Adele
- Promotional poster for the residency
- Location: Paradise, Nevada, United States
- Venue: The Colosseum at Caesars Palace
- Associated album: 30
- Start date: 18 November 2022
- End date: 23 November 2024
- No. of shows: 100
- Attendance: 100,000 (24 shows)
- Box office: $52.8 million (24 shows)

Adele concert chronology
- Adele Live 2016 (2016–2017); Weekends with Adele (2022–2024); Adele in Munich (2024)

Weekends with Adele was the first concert residency by English singer Adele, held at The Colosseum at Caesars Palace on the Las Vegas Strip in Paradise, Nevada. Initially scheduled to commence on 21 January 2022, she postponed it due to production delays and her team contracting COVID-19. Adele rescheduled the residency to begin on 18 November 2022, and after being extended, it was concluded on 23 November 2024. As part of it, she performed two shows at the venue every weekend.

The shows have a minimalistic beginning, with just Adele and a pianist, and later incorporate a band, background vocalists, an orchestra, and production elements like pyrotechnics, a waterfall, and a pool. Adele disappears in a vanishing act at the end of every show. Weekends with Adele received acclaim from critics, several of whom thought the rescheduled shows were worth the wait and praised the production and her vocal performance.

== Background ==
In 2016, Adele embarked on her third concert tour, Adele Live 2016, which ran through multiple continents and lasted 121 shows. She closed the tour with a series of shows at Wembley Stadium, during one of which she passed a handwritten note to attendees admitting she may not tour again: "Touring is a peculiar thing, it doesn't suit me particularly well. I'm a real homebody and I get so much joy in the small things [...] I wanted my final shows to be in London because I don't know if I'll ever tour again and so I want my last time to be at home." Adele cancelled the final two performances due to medical advice after she damaged her vocal cords. She would keep a low profile during the following years.

Adele announced her fourth studio album, 30, on 13 October 2021, and announced it would be released on 19 November of the same year. On the day following the announcement, "Easy on Me" was released as the lead single from the album. In a November interview, Adele stated that she really wanted to tour in support of 30 but would most likely not do it: "This album? No, probably not. I'd love to. [...] It doesn't sit right with me putting an album out this year and then touring it in 2023." She further denied rumours of an impending concert residency in an interview with Rolling Stone.

However, on 30 November, Adele announced the residency Weekends with Adele. It was planned to take place between 21 January and 16 April 2022, with Adele performing two shows at The Colosseum at Caesars Palace in Las Vegas every weekend (24 total shows). The 100,000 tickets that went on sale sold out within six hours, resulting in an average gross of 2.2 million dollars (1606000 British pounds) per show. The Guardian's Ben Beaumont-Thomas commented that since Vegas residences had been frequent among artists who were past their commercial peak, Adele was an outlier. But he thought it suited her situation due to its proximity to her son and his father's residence, her aversion to touring giant venues, and the intimate material on 30, which would resonate better with a smaller audience. It was also meant to circumvent the challenges posed to traditional concert tours by the COVID-19 pandemic.

== Postponements ==
On 20 January 2022, one day before the residency was scheduled to begin, Adele uploaded a video of herself crying and announcing its postponement on Instagram. Adele cited half of her team having COVID-19 as a reason along with production delays, saying "I'm so sorry, but my show ain't ready. We've tried absolutely everything that we can to put it together [but] we've been absolutely destroyed by delivery delays and COVID. Half my crew, half my team are down with COVID." Caesars Palace issued a statement supporting her decision to postpone and said they were confident that the rescheduled shows would "be extraordinary". The following day, Adele personally FaceTimed some fans at the hotel's gift shop to apologize.

A few days later, Adele announced that she would be performing at the Brit Awards 2022. This was met with backlash from fans who were yet to receive refunds for the postponed shows and believed it to be "tone deaf". In a July 2022 interview, Adele described the reaction as "brutal". She recalled that "I was a shell of a person for a couple of months" and had trouble moving on from the incident. Nonetheless, she maintained that she stood by her decision: "You can't buy me, I'm not just going to do a show because I have to or because people will be let down or because we're going to lose loads of money." She appeared to give credence to media reports claiming she had "creative differences" with the original stage designer, Esmeralda Devlin, and Caesars Palace. British firm Stufish Entertainment Architects, co-founded by Mark Fisher, helped Adele redesign and revitalise the Weekends with Adele stage.

On 25 July 2022, Adele announced the 24 rescheduled shows, as well as 8 additional shows, which would now run from 18 November 2022 to 25 March 2023. Fans who had previously held tickets for the original dates or had been waitlisted for the Verified fan presale were prioritized. On 15 August 2022, Adele said the postponement "was purely an artistic decision". She subsequently added two New Year's Eve weekend shows which would take place 30–31 December 2022. In March 2023, Adele announced she would perform 34 additional shows from June to November of the same year. A concert film was also announced onstage by Adele. It was later recorded during the 30 June–1 July weekend dates. In October 2023, she added a final 32 dates, extending the residency until June 2024.

On 27 February 2024, Adele announced on social media that her 10 shows in March would be postponed to a later date due to health concerns.

== Synopsis ==
A Weekends with Adele show spans more than two hours. The 20-track set list, the longest of her career until her Munich residency at 22, has the most songs from her second studio album, 21 (2011), and five from 30. The shows do not include any costume changes, but Adele dons a distinct floor-length black gown every weekend to make sure she remains "authentic" according to stylist Jamie Mizrahi. As of November 2022, Mizrahi had commissioned 20 gowns, from fashion houses including Schiaparelli, for the residency. Adele also wore Harris Reed's first design for Nina Ricci, a custom gown by Stella McCartney, and brands like Versace, Loewe, Louis Vuitton, Paco Rabanne, and Proenza Schouler.

The show commences with Adele performing a set of ballads. She comes out from a curtain of panels that resemble accordions and the shape of the letter A to perform "Hello", accompanied by just a pianist on the stage. Adele explained the minimalistic opening choice: "I wanted to start this small. And I wanted it to be all about me, obviously. That's why I came on and did 'Hello' with just me." During the chorus, 180-degree floor-to-ceiling screens are switched on and project four close-up images of her. "Easy on Me" is the second song on the set list, performed during the same set up with the piano. It can be described as the opening of her first act of the show showing off multiple lower tempo ballads. Adele follows this with the torch ballads "Turning Tables" and "Take It All". During "I Drink Wine", which closes the first act, a chandelier made of hundreds of glasses which sparkle with golden light drops into the space where she and her pianist have been performing, and the curtain of panels expands to reveal a band and background singers.

"Water Under the Bridge" is included approximately 30 minutes into the set list. It begins a section of more upbeat songs, so basically the second act performing lots of uptempo hits, before which Adele reminds the audience: "I don't have many uptempos, so if you want to dance, now's the time". She performs "Send My Love (To Your New Lover)" under hot pink lighting, followed by "Oh My God". “One and Only“ opens the third act, including 2 midtempo ballads, “One and Only“ and “Don‘t You Remember“. "One and Only", Adele is joined by three background vocalists who sing its main vocals while Adele performs its operatic backing vocals under a faint spotlight. She then does her famous t-Shirt gun. Further on, she sings "Don't You Remember" and "Rumour Has It". During "Skyfall", Adele performs with an orchestra of 24 string players, arranged as eight in three rows each and lit from a previously dark part of the stage. "Hometown Glory" and "Love in the Dark" are the next songs on the set list. She briefly vacates the stage to allow for production elements to be set up for the following performances, while a pre-recorded video of her singing "Cry Your Heart Out" is presented on the screen.

The "Set Fire to the Rain" performance incorporates pyrotechnics and a stage-wide waterfall; raindrops fall on the stage and a fire starts burning under a white piano, spreading throughout the stage before covering the piano. Towards the end of the performance, the piano sinks into a small pool of water. Adele sings "When We Were Young" while walking through the audience and asking about their favourite childhood memories, as confetti with Polaroid pictures from her life falls upon them. During "Hold On", the theatre is adorned with glimmering light as numerous lanterns descend from the rafters. It closes the act before an encore of 3 songs begins, including 2 of Adele's most popular hits and the closing song of her album “30“, “Love Is a Game“. While Adele performs "Someone like You" and "Rolling in the Deep", joined by three background vocalists during the latter, the cameras change direction and the audience members are projected on the screens. During „“Rolling In The Deep“, Adele performs a little dance together with her 3 backup vocalists, leads a singalong and lets a piano explode while confetti is shorting in all directions of the colosseum. The show closes with "Love Is a Game", during which she is accompanied by an instrumentation of strings and organ. Adele performs on the pastel-coloured stage, as heart-shaped confetti falls and inspirational messages are displayed, before disappearing into the confetti in a vanishing act.

=== Performance-specific events ===
Being a live show, Adele often banters and interacts with attendees. (Note: Some of the things she has discussed with them included a news story about Tom Sandoval's cheating and the Titan submersible implosion.) She also once signed a newly married bride's wedding dress and helped a couple reveal the gender of their baby. During the show on 18 November 2022, Adele performed choreography from Megan Thee Stallion's video for her song "Body" during "Water Under the Bridge", which she had previously incorporated into her British Summer Time concerts. After that same show, the vanishing act went viral on social media. At the show on 26 August 2023, Adele paused to defend a fan from a security guard while performing "Water Under the Bridge", and two months later during the show on 28 October 2023, Adele performed in a Morticia Addams costume for Halloween and, while performing "When We Were Young", asked the audience to "sing it for me" while she interacted with the doctor who delivered her son.

== Critical reception ==
Professional ratings
Review scores
Source	Rating
The Daily Telegraph	5/5 stars
The Times	4/5 stars

Weekends with Adele received critical acclaim. Several critics thought the rescheduled shows' quality was worth the wait. (Note: Cited to Billboard, The Daily Telegraph, The Hollywood Reporter, HuffPost, NPR, The Times, USA Today, and Vogue) Katie Atkinson of Billboard called the performance "utterly and breathlessly spectacular" and thought the attention to detail proved that "Adele lovingly dedicated the past 10 months to creating the intimate show of her dreams". Lindsay Zoladz of The New York Times described the stage as "breathtaking, full of drama and elegance befitting her voice" and praised Adele's decision to embark on a residency despite possessing the ability to go on a stadium tour. Keiran Southern of The Times said the show was "spectacular, intimate and worth the wait". The Daily Telegraph's Neil McCormick called it "intimate but spectacular, eccentric yet slick and richly emotional" and "an absolutely blockbusting, heart-soaring show packed with personality". NME's Will Richards described the stage setup as "tasteful and minimal", and NPR's Bilal Qureshi and Variety's Shirley Halperin lauded the sometimes minimalistic production choices as successful in creating intimacy.

Some critics commented on Adele's vocal performance and look. Atkinson wrote that her "powerful and nimble vocals" which form the "true centerpiece" of all Adele performances sounded ready to carry the residency to completion. On a similar note, Qureshi believed that "at center stage, the real Adele puts finely tuned physicality into every lyric" and she had, unsurprisingly, "never sounded better onstage". McCormick opined "she has range, tone, control, power and the ability to lose herself in the emotion" which makes her succeed. USA Today's Melissa Ruggieri thought that "Adele's voice was as impeccable as her sculpted eyebrows and French manicure", and Vogue's Christian Allaire believed her look suited Vegas while also maintaining her "glamorous, Old Hollywood style". Melinda Sheckells of The Hollywood Reporter and Zoladz thought she looked and sounded nervous during the first two songs but quickly returned to form in the following performances.

Critics also highlighted individual moments from the show as their favourite ones. In her list of the seven best moments, Atkinson mentioned the introduction of the floor-to-ceiling screens during "Hello", the production of the "Set Fire to the Rain" performance, Adele's walk through the crowd during "When We Were Young", and the confetti showers, among others. Qureshi described Adele singing the backing vocals of "One and Only" as "one of my favorite arrangements in the show". Sheckells cited the "Set Fire to the Rain" and "Hold On" performances as examples of when the show "wowed with even more stage effects". Zoladz described the former's "staging so gloriously over-the-top that it was giving Book of Revelations" but thought the "most emotionally effective part of the night" was during "When We Were Young".

== Live album ==
Weekends with Adele Live in Las Vegas

Live album by Adele
- Released: February 2025
- Venue: The Colosseum at Caesars Palace

Adele chronology
30 (2021)	Weekends with Adele Live in Las Vegas (2025)

Adele's second live album recorded during the residency released in February 2025; it is a box set consisting of three LP records, a photo book, and confetti from the show.

Weekends with Adele Live in Las Vegas track listing
No.	Title	Length
1.	"Hello"
2.	"Easy on Me"
3.	"Turning Tables"
4.	"Take It All"
5.	"I Drink Wine"
6.	"Water Under the Bridge"
7.	"Send My Love (To Your New Lover)"
8.	"Oh My God"
9.	"One and Only"
10.	"Don't You Remember"
11.	"Rumour Has It"
12.	"Skyfall"
13.	"Hometown Glory"
14.	"Love in the Dark"
15.	"Cry Your Heart Out"
16.	"Set Fire to the Rain"
17.	"When We Were Young"
18.	"Hold On"
19.	"Someone Like You"
20.	"Rolling in the Deep"
21.	"Love Is a Game"

== Set list ==
This is the set list for the show on 18 November 2022. It may not represent all shows.

1. "Hello" (Note: "Hello" incorporates a piano intro of "To Be Loved", a song that Adele had previously stated she would never perform live due to its emotional nature.)
2. "Easy on Me"
3. "Turning Tables"
4. "Take It All"
5. "I Drink Wine"
6. "Water Under the Bridge"
7. "Send My Love (To Your New Lover)"
8. "Oh My God"
9. "One and Only"
10. "Don't You Remember"
11. "Rumour Has It"
12. "Skyfall"
13. "Hometown Glory"
14. "Love in the Dark"
15. "Set Fire to the Rain"
16. "When We Were Young"
17. "Hold On"
18. "Someone like You"
19. "Rolling in the Deep"
20. "Love Is a Game"

=== Alterations ===
- Following Adele's Munich residency, "Don't You Remember" was replaced in the set list by "Make You Feel My Love".

== Shows ==
List of concerts
Date	City	Country	Venue	Attendance	Revenue
18 November 2022	Las Vegas	United States	The Colosseum at Caesars Palace	100,000 / 100,000	$52,800,000
19 November 2022	Las Vegas	United States	The Colosseum at Caesars Palace	100,000 / 100,000	$52,800,000
25 November 2022	Las Vegas	United States	The Colosseum at Caesars Palace	100,000 / 100,000	$52,800,000
26 November 2022	Las Vegas	United States	The Colosseum at Caesars Palace	100,000 / 100,000	$52,800,000
2 December 2022	Las Vegas	United States	The Colosseum at Caesars Palace	100,000 / 100,000	$52,800,000
3 December 2022	Las Vegas	United States	The Colosseum at Caesars Palace	100,000 / 100,000	$52,800,000
9 December 2022	Las Vegas	United States	The Colosseum at Caesars Palace	100,000 / 100,000	$52,800,000
10 December 2022	Las Vegas	United States	The Colosseum at Caesars Palace	100,000 / 100,000	$52,800,000
16 December 2022	Las Vegas	United States	The Colosseum at Caesars Palace	100,000 / 100,000	$52,800,000
17 December 2022	Las Vegas	United States	The Colosseum at Caesars Palace	100,000 / 100,000	$52,800,000
23 December 2022	Las Vegas	United States	The Colosseum at Caesars Palace	100,000 / 100,000	$52,800,000
24 December 2022	Las Vegas	United States	The Colosseum at Caesars Palace	100,000 / 100,000	$52,800,000
30 December 2022	Las Vegas	United States	The Colosseum at Caesars Palace	100,000 / 100,000	$52,800,000
31 December 2022	Las Vegas	United States	The Colosseum at Caesars Palace	100,000 / 100,000	$52,800,000
20 January 2023	Las Vegas	United States	The Colosseum at Caesars Palace	100,000 / 100,000	$52,800,000
21 January 2023	Las Vegas	United States	The Colosseum at Caesars Palace	100,000 / 100,000	$52,800,000
27 January 2023	Las Vegas	United States	The Colosseum at Caesars Palace	100,000 / 100,000	$52,800,000
28 January 2023	Las Vegas	United States	The Colosseum at Caesars Palace	100,000 / 100,000	$52,800,000
3 February 2023	Las Vegas	United States	The Colosseum at Caesars Palace	100,000 / 100,000	$52,800,000
4 February 2023	Las Vegas	United States	The Colosseum at Caesars Palace	100,000 / 100,000	$52,800,000
10 February 2023	Las Vegas	United States	The Colosseum at Caesars Palace	100,000 / 100,000	$52,800,000
11 February 2023	Las Vegas	United States	The Colosseum at Caesars Palace	100,000 / 100,000	$52,800,000
17 February 2023	Las Vegas	United States	The Colosseum at Caesars Palace	100,000 / 100,000	$52,800,000
18 February 2023	Las Vegas	United States	The Colosseum at Caesars Palace	100,000 / 100,000	$52,800,000
24 February 2023	Las Vegas	United States	The Colosseum at Caesars Palace	–	–
25 February 2023	Las Vegas	United States	The Colosseum at Caesars Palace	–	–
3 March 2023	Las Vegas	United States	The Colosseum at Caesars Palace	–	–
4 March 2023	Las Vegas	United States	The Colosseum at Caesars Palace	–	–
10 March 2023	Las Vegas	United States	The Colosseum at Caesars Palace	–	–
11 March 2023	Las Vegas	United States	The Colosseum at Caesars Palace	–	–
17 March 2023	Las Vegas	United States	The Colosseum at Caesars Palace	–	–
18 March 2023	Las Vegas	United States	The Colosseum at Caesars Palace	–	–
24 March 2023	Las Vegas	United States	The Colosseum at Caesars Palace	–	–
25 March 2023	Las Vegas	United States	The Colosseum at Caesars Palace	–	–
16 June 2023	Las Vegas	United States	The Colosseum at Caesars Palace	–	–
17 June 2023	Las Vegas	United States	The Colosseum at Caesars Palace	–	–
23 June 2023	Las Vegas	United States	The Colosseum at Caesars Palace	–	–
24 June 2023	Las Vegas	United States	The Colosseum at Caesars Palace	–	–
30 June 2023	Las Vegas	United States	The Colosseum at Caesars Palace	–	–
1 July 2023	Las Vegas	United States	The Colosseum at Caesars Palace	–	–
4 August 2023	Las Vegas	United States	The Colosseum at Caesars Palace	–	–
5 August 2023	Las Vegas	United States	The Colosseum at Caesars Palace	–	–
11 August 2023	Las Vegas	United States	The Colosseum at Caesars Palace	–	–
12 August 2023	Las Vegas	United States	The Colosseum at Caesars Palace	–	–
18 August 2023	Las Vegas	United States	The Colosseum at Caesars Palace	–	–
19 August 2023	Las Vegas	United States	The Colosseum at Caesars Palace	–	–
25 August 2023	Las Vegas	United States	The Colosseum at Caesars Palace	–	–
26 August 2023	Las Vegas	United States	The Colosseum at Caesars Palace	–	–
1 September 2023	Las Vegas	United States	The Colosseum at Caesars Palace	–	–
2 September 2023	Las Vegas	United States	The Colosseum at Caesars Palace	–	–
8 September 2023	Las Vegas	United States	The Colosseum at Caesars Palace	–	–
9 September 2023	Las Vegas	United States	The Colosseum at Caesars Palace	–	–
15 September 2023	Las Vegas	United States	The Colosseum at Caesars Palace	–	–
16 September 2023	Las Vegas	United States	The Colosseum at Caesars Palace	–	–
22 September 2023	Las Vegas	United States	The Colosseum at Caesars Palace	–	–
23 September 2023	Las Vegas	United States	The Colosseum at Caesars Palace	–	–
29 September 2023	Las Vegas	United States	The Colosseum at Caesars Palace	–	–
30 September 2023	Las Vegas	United States	The Colosseum at Caesars Palace	–	–
6 October 2023	Las Vegas	United States	The Colosseum at Caesars Palace	–	–
7 October 2023	Las Vegas	United States	The Colosseum at Caesars Palace	–	–
13 October 2023	Las Vegas	United States	The Colosseum at Caesars Palace	–	–
14 October 2023	Las Vegas	United States	The Colosseum at Caesars Palace	–	–
20 October 2023	Las Vegas	United States	The Colosseum at Caesars Palace	–	–
21 October 2023	Las Vegas	United States	The Colosseum at Caesars Palace	–	–
27 October 2023	Las Vegas	United States	The Colosseum at Caesars Palace	–	–
28 October 2023	Las Vegas	United States	The Colosseum at Caesars Palace	–	–
3 November 2023	Las Vegas	United States	The Colosseum at Caesars Palace	–	–
4 November 2023	Las Vegas	United States	The Colosseum at Caesars Palace	–	–
19 January 2024	Las Vegas	United States	The Colosseum at Caesars Palace	–	–
20 January 2024	Las Vegas	United States	The Colosseum at Caesars Palace	–	–
26 January 2024	Las Vegas	United States	The Colosseum at Caesars Palace	–	–
27 January 2024	Las Vegas	United States	The Colosseum at Caesars Palace	–	–
2 February 2024	Las Vegas	United States	The Colosseum at Caesars Palace	–	–
3 February 2024	Las Vegas	United States	The Colosseum at Caesars Palace	–	–
9 February 2024	Las Vegas	United States	The Colosseum at Caesars Palace	–	–
10 February 2024	Las Vegas	United States	The Colosseum at Caesars Palace	–	–
16 February 2024	Las Vegas	United States	The Colosseum at Caesars Palace	–	–
17 February 2024	Las Vegas	United States	The Colosseum at Caesars Palace	–	–
23 February 2024	Las Vegas	United States	The Colosseum at Caesars Palace	–	–
24 February 2024	Las Vegas	United States	The Colosseum at Caesars Palace	–	–
17 May 2024	Las Vegas	United States	The Colosseum at Caesars Palace	–	–
18 May 2024	Las Vegas	United States	The Colosseum at Caesars Palace	–	–
24 May 2024	Las Vegas	United States	The Colosseum at Caesars Palace	–	–
25 May 2024	Las Vegas	United States	The Colosseum at Caesars Palace	–	–
31 May 2024	Las Vegas	United States	The Colosseum at Caesars Palace	–	–
1 June 2024	Las Vegas	United States	The Colosseum at Caesars Palace	–	–
7 June 2024	Las Vegas	United States	The Colosseum at Caesars Palace	–	–
8 June 2024	Las Vegas	United States	The Colosseum at Caesars Palace	–	–
14 June 2024	Las Vegas	United States	The Colosseum at Caesars Palace	–	–
15 June 2024	Las Vegas	United States	The Colosseum at Caesars Palace	–	–
25 October 2024	Las Vegas	United States	The Colosseum at Caesars Palace	–	–
26 October 2024	Las Vegas	United States	The Colosseum at Caesars Palace	–	–
1 November 2024	Las Vegas	United States	The Colosseum at Caesars Palace	–	–
2 November 2024	Las Vegas	United States	The Colosseum at Caesars Palace	–	–
8 November 2024	Las Vegas	United States	The Colosseum at Caesars Palace	–	–
9 November 2024	Las Vegas	United States	The Colosseum at Caesars Palace	–	–
15 November 2024	Las Vegas	United States	The Colosseum at Caesars Palace	–	–
16 November 2024	Las Vegas	United States	The Colosseum at Caesars Palace	–	–
22 November 2024	Las Vegas	United States	The Colosseum at Caesars Palace	–	–
23 November 2024	Las Vegas	United States	The Colosseum at Caesars Palace	–	–
Total				100,000 / 100,000 (100%)	$52,800,000

== Personnel ==
=== Orchestra ===
The orchestra consists of 24 musicians performing each night, 16 of which are local to Las Vegas. Not all orchestra members may be listed.

- Amanda Andreasen – Cello
- De Ann Letourneau – Violin
- James Harvey - Violin
- Brandon Buckmaster – Violin
- Jennifer Hellewell – Viola
- Patrick Hsieh – Violin
- Adrianna Thurber – Violin
- Nataliya Karachentseva – Violin
- Wei Wei Le – Violin
- Yunior Lopez – Viola
- Chandra Meibalane – Violin
- Ai Melby – Viola
- David Warner – Cello
- Ivo Gradev – Violin
- Rebecca Sabine Ramsey – Violin
- Mert Sermet – Cello
- Omar Shelley – Viola
- Lindsey Springer – Cello
- Hanna Suk – Viola
- Robert Taylor – Violin
- Geri Thompson – Violin
- Lisa Liu – Violin
- Donna Martinez – Violin
- Crystal Yuan – Viola - Orchestra Contractor
