= Water Under the Bridge =

2016 single by Adele

Single by Adele

from the album 25
- Released: 14 November 2016
- Studio: Metropolis (London)
- Genre: Pop; soul; soft rock
- Length: 4:00
- Label: Columbia
- Songwriters: Adele Adkins; Greg Kurstin
- Producer: Greg Kurstin

Adele singles chronology
"Send My Love (To Your New Lover)" (2016)	"Water Under the Bridge" (2016)	"Easy on Me" (2021)

Audio video
- "Water Under the Bridge" on YouTube

"Water Under the Bridge" is a song by English singer Adele from her third studio album 25 (2015). Adele wrote the song with its producer, Greg Kurstin. Columbia Records released the track as the album's fourth single on 14 November 2016. A mid-tempo pop, soul and soft rock song, "Water Under the Bridge" incorporates influences of 1980s music, R&B, and a gospel choir over guitars and snare drums. Inspired by her relationship with charity founder Simon Konecki, whom Adele dated for seven years and married in 2018, the song speaks of forgiveness and details the crucial point in a courtship of determining whether one's partner is willing to put in the work to make it succeed.

Music critics praised Adele's vocal performance, though some thought it was too loud and criticised some of the production choices. It reached number one in Israel; the top 10 in Poland, Belgium, and Iceland; and gained Platinum or higher certifications in Canada, Mexico, and the United Kingdom. Adele performed it for her NBC special Adele Live in New York City and on The Tonight Show Starring Jimmy Fallon and included it on the set list of her concert tour Adele Live 2016 and her residency Weekends with Adele. In 2021, a mashup of it and Megan Thee Stallion's performance of "Body" at the American Music Awards of 2020 became a trend on TikTok.

== Background ==
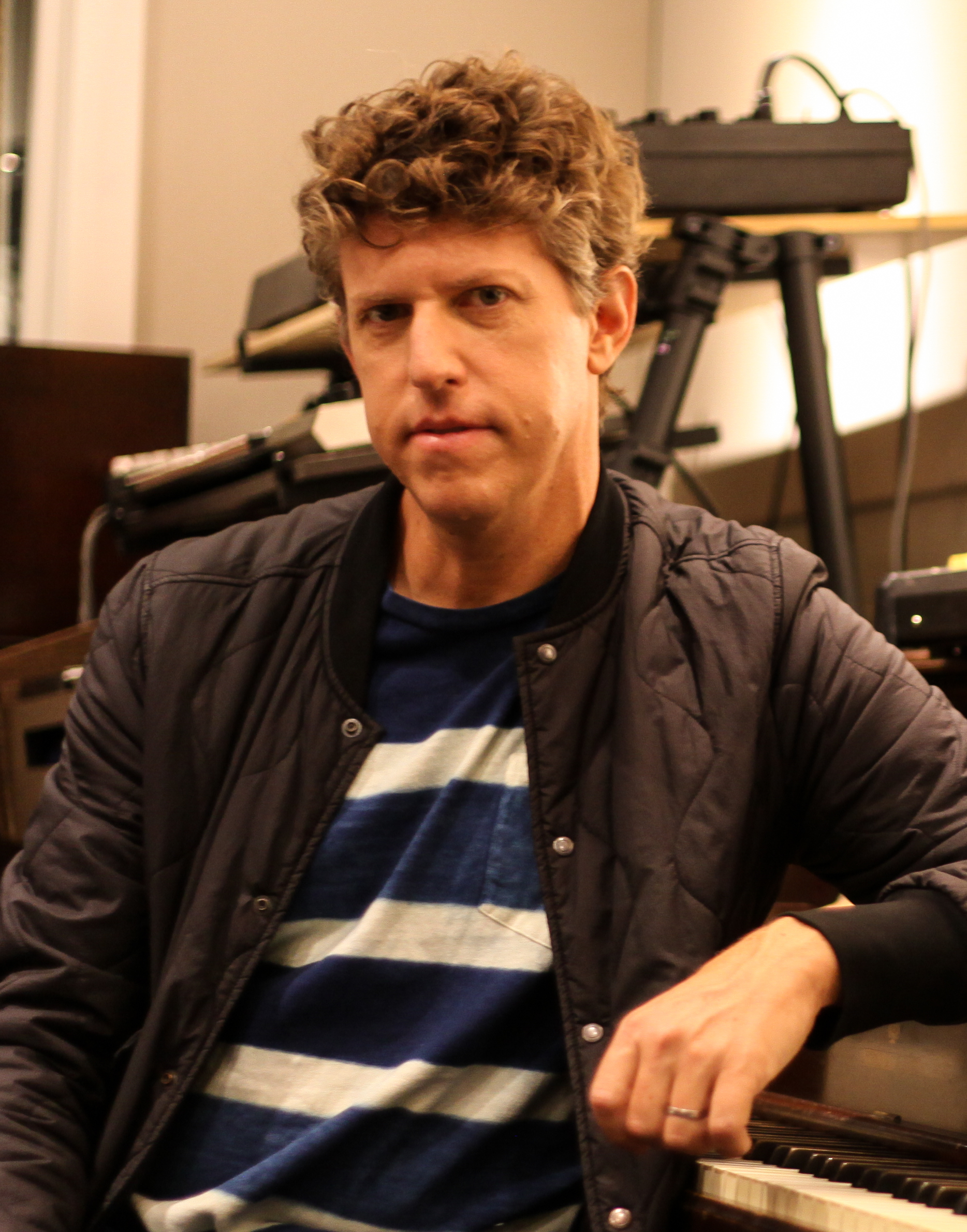
Greg Kurstin (pictured in 2017) produced and co-wrote "Water Under the Bridge".

Adele announced in February 2013 that she was holding meetings related to what would be her third studio album. Initial recording sessions for the album were unfruitful, she recounted: "I felt like I was never going to finish this record. It was a long process. I wanted to give up a lot because I couldn't do it. I thought I'd run out of ideas and I'd lost my ability to write a song." Adele made progress upon meeting with American producer Greg Kurstin, with whom she was able to work constructively and "it all poured right out of [her]". They wrote the song "Hello" (2015), which was released as the lead single from the album and reached number one in 36 countries, and its music video broke the Vevo record for most single-day views.

Kurstin produced two more songs for 25 (2015)—"Million Years Ago" and "Water Under the Bridge". The latter was inspired by Adele's relationship with charity founder Simon Konecki, whom she dated for seven years and married in May 2018, a topic she is usually reluctant to discuss in her music. She stated: "'Water Under the Bridge' is more like, I'm waiting for him to be horrible but I don't think he's gonna be, waiting for the relationship to end." Adele thought that although her past relationships faltered and burned out at the slightest glimpse of an obstacle, her bond with Konecki made her feel "superpowerful" and was enduring: "Overcoming everything is actually what makes us so great and so powerful, and makes our love so deep."

Adele announced 25's tracklist, which included "Water Under the Bridge" as the sixth track, on 22 October 2015. The song became available for digital download on the album, which was released on 20 November 2015. XL Recordings released it as the fourth single from 25 on the iTunes Store with single artwork. Columbia Records serviced "Water Under the Bridge" to adult album alternative and contemporary hit radio stations in the United States on 14 and 15 November 2016, respectively.

== Composition ==
"Water Under the Bridge"
A 24-second sample of the final chorus of "Water Under the Bridge", accompanied by snare drums and a soaring gospel choir

"Water Under the Bridge" is four minutes long. The song was recorded at Metropolis Studios in London, produced by Kurstin and engineered by him, Liam Nolan, Alex Pasco, and Julian Burg. Kurstin played bass, drums, guitar, piano, and keyboards. Tom Coyne and Randy Merrill mastered it at Sterling Sound Studios in New York City, and Serban Ghenea and John Hanes handled mixing at MixStar Studios in Virginia Beach, Virginia.

"Water Under the Bridge" is a mid-tempo pop, soul, and soft rock song, with influences of 1980s music and R&B. The song has an instrumentation of guitars and reverberating snare drums. It opens with an electro-drum beat and a tropical, trip hop riff, followed by a jazz hands melody. After a series of key changes, the gospel choir in the background "finally gets going" towards the climax of "Water Under the Bridge" according to PopMatters's Chris Gerard, which Rolling Stone's Jon Dolan described as "gospel-steeped ecstasy". Sal Cinquemani of Slant Magazine called some of the song's vocals "submerged yelps", and Gerard alleged that they were "digitally treated".

"Water Under the Bridge" has a lyrical theme of forgiveness. The song details uncertainty and the crucial point in a relationship of determining whether one's "partner is in or out". Adele attempts to protract a cantankerous romantic relationship on it, promising she wants to stay together but feeling driven apart by his recklessness. She asks if he is "going to let [her] down", he should "let [her] down gently". In an alternate take, Vogue's Patricia Garcia interpreted "Water Under the Bridge" as a song about "a mismatched relationship that she clearly knows she needs to end". Leonie Cooper of NME described the song as a "dramatic diary entry to her ex".

== Critical reception ==
Digital Spy's Lewis Corner thought the song possessed the "chewiest melody" Adele had ever recorded to, and though its production recalled Kurstin's work on Katy Perry's album Prism (2013), Adele distinguished it due to the piercing lyrics and her vocals. Andy Gill of The Independent believed that its understated style allowed Adele's vocals to shine. Cinquemani likened "Water Under the Bridge" to the work of Jessie Ware and found its abstruse but intrepid flourishes among the few moments on 25 that did justice to Adele's strong and dynamic voice. Writing for DIY, Tom Connick said the clangorous drumming and capering guitar lines elevated the song, and The Telegraph's Neil McCormick described it as a mysterious and booming "big production drama". Clash's Gareth James felt that, though it had a behemoth chorus, it perfectly balances between being monumental and innocuous. Stephen Thomas Erlewine of AllMusic described "Water Under the Bridge" as "begging to be played over the closing credits of an inspirational biopic". Writing for Exclaim!, Sarah Murphy was pleased by Adele taking a break from the "piano-pop formula" to explore "more interesting, groove-driven patterns" on the song. The Boston Globe's Sarah Rodman described it as an "earwormy, hip-swiveler" that added the necessary "bounce" to 25.

The New York Times wrote that Adele depicts the gravest of pain with a great deal of lucidity and composure on "Water Under the Bridge", and it could be placid if Adele's vocals were less loud. Gerard deemed the song among 25's "least successful tracks", owing to its beats and Adele's extremely loud vocals. He thought its melody resembled pop radio hits of the time but found its concluding "wall of sound" and choir a "stirring conclusion". The Chicago Tribune's Greg Kot found the gospel choir a sketchy addition on "Water Under the Bridge" and its snare drums annoying and reminiscent of a cannon being fired. Alexandra Pollard of Gigwise found the song's beat fascinating but opined a minimalistic production might have fit it as well. Writing for the Toronto Star, Ben Rayner believed that eschewing the "windblown, Sermon From the Mount production" would not have hurt its quality. The Times's Will Hodgkinson, and the Business Post's Johnnie Craig and Tony Clayton-Lea, criticised its 1980s influences, the latter pair describing it as "a forgotten 1980s dad-funk B-side".

The song appeared on retrospective rankings of Adele's discography in the 2020s. Rolling Stone listed "Water Under the Bridge" as Adele's 18th-best song, Brittany Spanos expressing disappointment that "this slice of pop heaven" did not become a huge success. Billboard's Chuck Arnold placed the song at number 28 in a ranking of her discography and noted that though it is "a perfectly good pop song" and "Adele elevates whatever she touches", it could have been recorded by any of her peers. Alexis Petridis of The Guardian, who ranked it at number 34, offered a similar take: "'Water Under the Bridge' lays bare the drawbacks of working with blue-chip songwriters, [...] It's a perfectly serviceable bit of pop-soul, with a good chorus and a vague hint of tropical house, but it feels slightly boilerplate."

== Commercial performance ==
"Water Under the Bridge" peaked at number 39 on the UK Singles Chart, and received a 2× Platinum certification from the British Phonographic Industry. On 14 December 2015, Billboard reported that the song had sold 104,000 downloads in the United States, the third-most from 25 and the most among non-singles. It reached number 26 on the US Billboard Hot 100, and the Recording Industry Association of America certified it Gold. "Water Under the Bridge" charted at number 37 on the Canadian Hot 100 and earned a 3× Platinum certification from Music Canada.

In Australia, "Water Under the Bridge" peaked at number 23 and the Australian Recording Industry Association certified it Gold. The song reached number 15 in New Zealand, and received a Gold certification from Recorded Music NZ. Elsewhere, it charted within the top 20, at number one in Israel, number five in Poland, number 10 in Belgium and Iceland, number 14 in Slovenia, number 16 in Argentina and Brazil, and number 20 in Finland and Hungary. "Water Under the Bridge" earned a Platinum certification in Mexico and Gold in Belgium, Denmark, and Italy.

== Promotion and other usage ==
Adele first performed "Water Under the Bridge" live during her NBC special Adele Live in New York City, recorded at Radio City Music Hall on 17 November 2015. She reprised the song on The Tonight Show Starring Jimmy Fallon on 23 November. Writing for Billboard, Lars Brandle described the rendition as "a confident, first-rate performance", and Adelle Platon thought she "sang her heart out". Adele included it in the set list for her concert tour Adele Live 2016, which contained a date at the Glastonbury Festival 2016.

Sarah Stone, a The Voice Australia season six contestant, sang a cover of "Water Under the Bridge" in 2017. On 22 March 2021, Kelly Clarkson covered the song on The Kelly Clarkson Show; Billboard's Gil Kaufman remarked it was "right in [her] sweet spot" and a flawless way to lead into the following week of performances as it progressed into a crescendo before concluding with an ascending a cappella segment.

In November 2021, a tweet containing a mashup of "Water Under the Bridge" and Megan Thee Stallion's performance of "Body" at the American Music Awards of 2020 went viral. A dance challenge with the mashup gained popularity on TikTok and users attempted to recreate the clip's choreography, in spite of Adele's apprehensions about the application. Three months later, Megan stated she had seen the clip and revealed Adele was her dream collaboration: "If Adele wants me to come get on the track, be the dancer, I'm there, I'm here for it." Adele included this choreography while performing the song at her British Summer Time concerts on 1 and 2 July 2022. She added it in the set list of her concert residency Weekends with Adele.

== Credits and personnel ==
Credits are adapted from the liner notes of 25.

- Greg Kurstin – producer, songwriter, engineering, bass, drums, guitar, piano, keyboards
- Adele – songwriter
- Tom Coyne – mastering
- Randy Merrill – mastering
- Serban Ghenea – mixing
- John Hanes – mixing
- Liam Nolan – engineering
- Alex Pasco – engineering
- Julian Burg – engineering

== Charts ==
=== Weekly charts ===
Weekly chart positions for "Water Under the Bridge"
Chart (2015–17)	Peak position
Argentina Anglo (Monitor Latino)	16
Australia (ARIA)	23
Austria (Ö3 Austria Top 40)	42
Belgium (Ultratop 50 Flanders)	10
Belgium (Ultratop 50 Wallonia)	25
Brazil (Hot 100 Airplay)	26
Brazil (Billboard Brasil Pop Airplay)	16
Canada Hot 100 (Billboard)	37
Canada AC (Billboard)	2
Canada CHR/Top 40 (Billboard)	31
Canada Hot AC (Billboard)	3
Czech Republic Singles Digital (ČNS IFPI)	76
Finland Download (Latauslista)	20
France (SNEP)	56
Germany (GfK)	80
Germany (Airplay Chart)	5
Hungary (Rádiós Top 40)	20
Iceland (RÚV)	10
Ireland (IRMA)	27
Israel International Airplay (Media Forest)	1
Italy (FIMI)	89
Netherlands (Dutch Top 40)	25
Netherlands (Single Top 100)	71
New Zealand (Recorded Music NZ)	15
Poland Airplay (ZPAV)	5
Portugal (AFP)	64
Scottish Singles Sales (Official Charts)	45
Slovakia Airplay (ČNS IFPI)	23
Slovakia Singles Digital (ČNS IFPI)	72
Slovenia (SloTop50)	14
Spain (Promusicae)	42
South Korea International Chart (Gaon)	21
Sweden (Sverigetopplistan)	74
Switzerland (Schweizer Hitparade)	77
UK Singles (Official Charts)	39
UK Independent (Official Charts)	1
US Billboard Hot 100	26
US Adult Alternative Airplay (Billboard)	16
US Adult Contemporary (Billboard)	3
US Adult Pop Airplay (Billboard)	4
US Pop Airplay (Billboard)	18

=== Year-end charts ===
Year-end chart positions for "Water Under the Bridge"
Chart (2017)	Position
Australia (ARIA)	95
Belgium (Ultratop Flanders)	99
Poland (ZPAV)	97
Slovenia (SloTop50)	42
US Billboard Hot 100	88
US Adult Contemporary (Billboard)	3
US Adult Top 40 (Billboard)	8
US Mainstream Top 40 (Billboard)	50

== Certifications ==
Certifications for "Water Under the Bridge"
Region	Certification	Certified units/sales
Australia (ARIA)	Gold	35,000^{‡}
Belgium (BRMA)	Gold	10,000^{‡}
Brazil (Pro-Música Brasil)	Platinum	60,000^{‡}
Canada (Music Canada)	3× Platinum	240,000^{‡}
Denmark (IFPI Danmark)	Platinum	90,000^{‡}
Italy (FIMI)	Gold	25,000^{‡}
Mexico (AMPROFON)	Platinum	60,000^{‡}
New Zealand (RMNZ)	4× Platinum	120,000^{‡}
Spain (Promusicae)	Gold	30,000^{‡}
United Kingdom (BPI)	2× Platinum	1,200,000^{‡}
United States (RIAA)	Gold	500,000^{‡}
^{‡} Sales+streaming figures based on certification alone.

== Radio and release history ==
Release dates and format(s) for "Water Under the Bridge"
Region	Date	Format	Label	Ref.
United States	14 November 2016	Adult album alternative	Columbia	
United States	15 November 2016	Mainstream radio	Columbia	
