= River Lea (song) =

Song by Adele

from the album 25
- Studio: MXM Studios, Stockholm; Eastcote Studios, London
- Genre: Gospel
- Length: 3:45
- Label: XL
- Songwriters: Adele Adkins; Brian Burton
- Producer: Danger Mouse

"River Lea" is a song by English singer-songwriter Adele from her third studio album, 25 (2015). The song was written by Adele Adkins and Brian Burton, while production of the song was provided by Burton under his pseudonym Danger Mouse. Lyrically, the track is partly about the River Lea in London. Musically, the song is a gospel song with a ghostly feel. "River Lea" received positive reviews from critics, with The Guardian calling it "one of the most striking tracks" on 25 and spent 32 weeks at #1 on gospel chart song in US.

The song peaked at number 5 on the Finland Chart and number 80 on the France Chart. It debuted at number 97 on the Official German Charts.

== Composition ==
"River Lea"
A 22-second sample of "River Lea"'s ending, a gospel song with a ghostly feel.

"River Lea" is a biographical song with a "ghostly feel." It is partly about the River Lea, a London tributary to the River Thames. It is a marshy river, and its significance to Adele is that it is located near her birthplace. Adele says, "A lot of my life was spent walking alongside the River Lea to go and get somewhere else." Adele also describes how the song is about how she has changed from the time she lived in the area around the river. There is a lot of guilt wrapped up in the song and Adele "cuts off the ends of her sentences as if she does not want to say what she is saying." SPIN magazine writes that she takes the name of the river itself and "warps the phrase into an amorphous being." The song is in the genre of gospel music. The music behind the lyrics contains "choirlike keyboard chords created from her own sampled voice."

"River Lea" is written in the key of E♭ minor with a tempo of 83 beats per minute. The song follows a chord progression of C♭ – D♭ – E♭m – A♭, and Adele's vocals span from E♭_{3} to B♭_{4}.

== Charts ==
| Chart (2015) | Peak position |
|---|---|
| Finland Download (Latauslista) | 5 |
| France (SNEP) | 80 |
| Germany (GfK) | 97 |
| South Korea International Chart (Gaon) | 29 |
| UK Indie (Official Charts) | 45 |

== Certifications ==
| Region | Certification | Certified units/sales |
|---|---|---|
| New Zealand (RMNZ) | Gold | 15,000^{‡} |
| United Kingdom (BPI) | Silver | 200,000^{‡} |
^{‡} Sales+streaming figures based on certification alone.
