= Simili Tour =

2016 concert tour by Laura Pausini

- Tour by Laura Pausini
- Promotional poster for the tour
- Associated album: Simili
- Start date: 25 May 2016
- End date: 25 October 2016
- Legs: 3
- No. of shows: 12 in Europe; 12 in North America; 9 in South America; 33 in total

Laura Pausini concert chronology
- The Greatest Hits World Tour (2013–14); Simili Tour (2016); Fatti Sentire World Tour (2018)

The Simili Tour (also known as the Similares Tour and #PausiniStadi) was the eighth concert tour by Italian singer Laura Pausini. Launched in the spring of 2016, the tour promoted her twelfth studio album Simili (2015). Over the course of five months, the tour visited Europe and the Americas.

== Background ==
In May 2015, Pausini confirmed on her social medias the album release and forthcoming world tour. In November 2015, Pausini announced during an interview that the tour would come to the Americas then back to Europe in October 2016. That same day, she said that the setlists would differ from place to place and that the show structure would be different as well. 6 June 2015 was declared "Simili Day" in three cities: Milan, Rome and Bari.

== Opening acts ==
- Biagio Antonacci (Rome)
- Giuliano Sangiorgi (Bari)
- Chiquis Rivera (Los Angeles)

== Setlist ==
The following setlist was obtained from the concert held on 4 June 2016, at San Siro in Milan, Italy. It does not present all concerts for the duration of the tour.

1. "Simili"
2. "Resta in ascolto"
3. "Innamorata"
4. "Non ho mai smesso" / ""Il Nostro Amore Quotidiano" / "Se non te"
5. "Nella Porta Accanto" / "Bellissimo così" / "Ascolta il tuo cuore"
6. "Invece no"
7. "La geografia del mio cammino" / "Chiedilo al Cielo" / "Una storia che vale"
8. "Sono Solo Nuvole"
9. "Come se non fosse stato mai amore"
10. "It's Not Goodbye" / "200 Note"/"it:Seamisai"
11. "Bom Dia, Tristeza"
12. "Primavera in anticipo (It Is My Song)"
13. "Ho Creduto a Me"
14. "Tra te e il mare"
15. "Il tuo nome in maiuscolo" / "Nel modo più sincero che c'è" / "Casomai" / "Un fatto ovvio" / "Colpevole" / "La prospettiva di me","Un'emergenza d'amore"
16. "Celeste" / "È a Lei Che Devo l'Amore"
17. "Con la musica alla radio" / "Benvenuto" / "Io canto" / "Per la Musica"
18. "Vivimi"
19. "E ritorno da te"
20. "Incancellabile" / "Le cose che vivi" / "Il mondo che vorrei" / "Strani amori" / "La solitudine"
21. "Limpido" / "Surrender" / "Io C'ero (+ Amore x Favore)" bis
22. "Lato destro del cuore"

== Tour dates ==
Date	City	Country	Venue
Europe
25 May 2016	Imola	Italy	Autodromo Enzo e Dino Ferrari
4 June 2016	Milan	Italy	San Siro
5 June 2016	Milan	Italy	San Siro
11 June 2016	Rome	Italy	Stadio Olimpico
18 June 2016	Bari	Italy	Stadio della Vittoria
North America
26 July 2016	Brampton	Canada	Powerade Centre
28 July 2016	New York City	United States	Tidal Theater
30 July 2016	Miami	United States	Waterfront Theatre
5 August 2016	Los Angeles	United States	Microsoft Theater
10 August 2016	Monterrey	Mexico	Arena Monterrey
12 August 2016	Mexico City	Mexico	Auditorio Nacional
14 August 2016	Zapopan	Mexico	Auditorio Telmex
16 August 2016	Querétaro City	Mexico	Auditorio Josefa Ortiz de Domínguez
18 August 2016	Puebla	Mexico	Auditorio Metropolitano
20 August 2016	San José	Costa Rica	Estadio Nacional
23 August 2016	Panama City	Panama	Plaza Figali
South America
28 August 2016	Quito	Ecuador	Coliseo General Rumiñahui
31 August 2016	Lima	Peru	Explanada Sur del Monumental
2 September 2016	Santiago	Chile	Movistar Arena
3 September 2016	Buenos Aires	Argentina	Estadio G.E.B.A.
7 September 2016	Luque	Paraguay	Centro de Convenciones de la Conmebol
9 September 2016	Punta del Este	Uruguay	Conrad Resort Grounds
11 September 2016	São Paulo	Brazil	Citibank Hall
12 September 2016	São Paulo	Brazil	Citibank Hall
14 September 2016	Rio de Janeiro	Brazil	Metropolitan
North America
17 September 2016	San Juan	Puerto Rico	José Miguel Agrelot Coliseum
Europe
15 October 2016	London	England	Eventim Apollo
16 October 2016	Brussels	Belgium	Forest National
18 October 2016	Stuttgart	Germany	Porsche-Arena
20 October 2016	Zürich	Switzerland	Hallenstadion
21 October 2016	Geneva	Switzerland	SEG Geneva Arena
23 October 2016	Essen	Germany	Grugahalle
25 October 2016	Munich	Germany	Olympiahalle

Cancellations and rescheduled shows

25 August 2016	Medellín, Colombia	Plaza de Toros La Macarena	Cancelled
26 August 2016	Bogotá, Colombia	Gran Carpa Américas de Corferias	Cancelled
7 October 2016	Madrid, Spain	Barclaycard Center	Cancelled
8 October 2016	Barcelona, Spain	Palau Sant Jordi	Cancelled
10 October 2016	Marseille, France	Le Dôme de Marseille	Cancelled
12 October 2016	Paris, France	AccorHotels Arena	Cancelled
13 October 2016	Esch-sur-Alzette, Luxembourg	Rockhal	Cancelled

=== Box office score data ===
Venue	City	Tickets sold / Available	Gross revenue
Movistar Arena	Santiago	10,782 / 11,404 (94%)	$595,540
Citibank Hall	São Paulo	7,433 / 8,340 (89%)	$640,135
Hallenstadion	Zürich	8,350 / 13,000 (64%)	$609,724

== Band ==
- Electric guitar and musical direction: Paolo Carta
- Electric and acoustic guitar: Nicola Oliva
- Piano: Fabio Coppini
- Keyboards: Andrea Rongioletti
- Bass: Roberto Gallinelli
- Drums: Carlos Hércules
- Percussion: Ernesto López
- Strings: Giuseppe Tortora, Adriana Ester Gallo, Mario Gentili, Marcello Iaconetti
- Backing vocals: Roberta Granà, Mónica Hill, Gianluigi Fazio, Ariane Diakitè, David Blank, Claudia D'Ulisse
- Choreography: Jonathan Redavid
- DJ: Joseph Carta
