= The Greatest Hits World Tour =

2013–15 concert tour by Laura Pausini

- Tour by Laura Pausini
- Promotional poster for the tour
- Associated album: 20: The Greatest Hits
- Start date: 5 December 2013
- End date: 7 August 2015
- Legs: 5
- No. of shows: 30 in Europe; 21 in America; 2 in Oceania; 53 in total

Laura Pausini concert chronology
- Inedito World Tour (2011–12); The Greatest Hits World Tour (2013–15); Simili Tour (2016)

The Greatest Hits World Tour is the seventh concert world tour by Italian singer Laura Pausini, in promotion of her compilation album 20 – The Greatest Hits that was released on 12 November 2013. The tour began with a show in Pesaro, Italy on 5 December 2013 and ended on 7 August 2015 in Marbella, Spain. In Spanish-speaking countries, the tour was renamed "Grandes Exitos Gira Mundial".

In February 2014, Pausini confirmed on her official site that the tour would be extended and that more shows would be scheduled after the 20 originally planned. This new set of concerts included two performances in Australia and one performance in Russia, marking the first time Pausini performs in such countries.

On 10 June 2014, Pausini postponed her two Australian shows and two Russian 'due to unforeseen technical problems and production issues'. The Melbourne concert scheduled for 12 June 2014 at Rod Laver Arena would now take place on 13 February 2015 at a smaller venue, Margaret Court Arena. The 14 June, Sydney show was announced for 14 February 2015. The show in St. Petersburg, Russia on 24 June 2014 was cancelled; and the show in Moscow scheduled for 27 June 2014, was rescheduled to 17 February 2015.

== Background ==
On 26 February 2013, in order to celebrate the twentieth anniversary of her career, Pausini released a digital single including the original versions in Italian, Spanish and English of the song which launched her career in 1993, "La solitudine". The track was launched as a limited-edition single, available for purchase for a week only. Later during the same year, she confirmed that a greatest hits album would be released for the same purpose by December 2013.

On 1 June 2013 Pausini took part in the concert Chime for Change in London, supporting the global campaign of the same name for girls' and women's empowerment. Pausini performed the songs "Io canto" and "It's Not Goodbye". During the same year, she appeared as a featured artist on the track "Sonríe (Smile)", included in American singer Gloria Estefan's album The Standards. A new world tour was also confirmed by Pausini through her official website. Starting from December 2013, Pausini would promote her greatest hits album with concerts in her native Italy, as well as in other European countries, in Latin America, in the United States and in Canada. The tour also includes a performance during the Viña del Mar International Song Festival in Chile.

On 9 September 2013, Pausini released a new single named "Limpido" (in Spanish, "Limpio"), in order to promote her new album. The song is a duet between Pausini and the Australian singer Kylie Minogue. On the same day, the name of the album was confirmed to be 20 – The Greatest Hits / 20 – Grandes Exitos.

== Special guests ==
Many of the world tour's concerts featured other singers as special guests, personally invited by Pausini.

On 22 December 2013, Italian singers Emma Marrone and Biagio Antonacci shared with Pausini the vocals in the songs "Come se non fosse stato mai amore" and "Vivimi", respectively.

It was confirmed by Laura Pausini that three other concerts would have special guests. The first one was the one in Mexico City on 28 February 2014, where Pausini was joined by fellow singers Ximena Sariñana and Aleks Syntek. The second one was the one in Miami, on 2 March 2014 where Luis Fonsi, and Biagio Antonacci, joined Laura in the songs "Como si no nos hubiéramos amado" and "Víveme/Vivimi". The third show was in New York City where she sang with the group Il Volo and the singers Biagio Antonacci, Miguel Bosé, Ivete Sangalo and Gloria Estefan.

For the concerts held in Mexico, in the month of November 2014, Pausini invited the participants of La Voz (Mexican TV series), to sing with her on stage. Mexican singer Yuri was invited to the last concert in Mexico held in the country's capital.

== Setlist ==
Italy, France, Belgium, Switzerland, Brazil
1. Se non te
2. Non ho mai smesso
3. Benvenuto
4. Con la musica alla radio
5. Primavera in anticipo
6. Invece no
7. Io canto
8. Uguale a lei
9. Prendo te
10. Resta in ascolto
11. Vivimi
12. Come se non fosse stato mai amore
13. Surrender
14. E ritorno da te
15. Tra te e il mare
16. Un'emergenza d'amore
17. It's not goodbye
18. Incancellabile
19. Le cose che vivi/Tudo o que eu vivo
20. Gente
21. Strani amori
  (bis 1)
22. Non c'è/Se fue
  (bis 2)
23. Dove resto solo io
24. Limpido
25. La solitudine
Spain, Argentina, Chile, Mexico, United States, Canada
1. Sino a ti
2. Jamás abandoné
3. Bienvenido
4. Con la música en la radio
5. Primavera anticipada (It Is My Song)
6. En cambio no
7. Yo canto
8. She (Uguale a lei)
9. Prendo te
10. Escucha atento
11. Víveme
12. Come si no nos hubiéramos amado
13. Surrender
14. Volveré junto a ti
15. Entre tu y mil mares
16. Emergencia de amor
17. It's Not Good-Bye/En Ausencia de Ti
18. Inolvidable
19. Las cosas que vives/Tudo o que eu vivo
20. Gente
21. Amores extraños
22. Se fue
23. Donde quedo solo yo
24. Limpio (Spanglish Version)
25. La soledad
Viña del Mar International Song Festival
1. Limpio
2. Entre tú y mil mares
3. Bienvenido
4. Primavera anticipada (It Is My Song)
5. En cambio no
6. Volveré junto a ti
7. Víveme
8. Quiero decirte que te amo
9. Las cosas que vives
10. Escucha atento
11. Emergencia de amor
12. Como si no nos hubiéramos amado
13. Gente
14. Inolvidable
15. Amores extraños
16. Se fue
  (bis)
17. La soledad

Summer tour

Italy
1. Limpido
2. Se non te
3. Non ho mai smesso
4. Benvenuto
5. Primavera in anticipo (It Is My Song)
6. Invece no
7. Io canto
8. Tra te e il mare
9. She (Uguale a lei)
10. Incancellabile
11. Prendo te
12. Resta in ascolto
13. Con la musica alla radio
14. Come se non fosse stato mai amore
15. Surrender
16. E ritorno da te
17. Un'emergenza d'amore
18. It's Not Good-Bye
19. Le cose che vivi
20. Vivimi
21. Gente
22. Strani amori
23. Non c'è/Se fué
24. Dove resto solo io
25. La solitudine
Italy – Taormina (18 May 2014)
1. Benvenuto
2. Limpido
3. Se non te (with Paola Cortellesi)
4. Strani amori
5. Avrai (with Claudio Baglioni)
6. Primavera in anticipo (It Is My Song)/Primavera anticipada (It Is My Song) (with Marco Mengoni)
7. Tra te e il mare
8. Con la musica alla radio (with Malika Ayane, Noemi, Emma Marrone, Paola Turci, L'Aura, Syria and La Pina)
9. Come se non fosse stato mai amore
10. Io canto (with Fiorella Mannoia)
11. Invece no
12. Mi rubi l'anima (with Raf)
13. Le cose che vivi (with her friends Elisa, Lorena and Ottavia)
14. Vivimi (with Biagio Antonacci)
15. Felicità (virtual duet with Lucio Dalla)
16. La solitudine
17. Medley a cappella: Resta in ascolto, She (Uguale a lei), Incancellabile, Se fue, Una storia che vale, La geografia del mio cammino, Seamisai (Sei que me amavas), Celeste
Spain – Festival Valladolid Latino
1. Limpio
2. Sino a ti
3. Entre tú y mil mares
4. Jamàs abandonè
5. Bienvenido
6. Primavera anticipada (It Is My Song)
7. Con la musica en la radio
8. Volveré junto a tí
9. Escucha atento
10. Emergencia de amor
11. Como si no nos hubiéramos amado
12. En cambio no
13. Yo canto
14. Inolvidable
15. Víveme
16. En ausencia de ti
17. Gente
18. Amores extraños
19. Las cosas que vives
20. Se fué
21. La soledad

=== Additional notes ===
- On 22 December 2013, Come se non fosse stato mai amore was performed with Emma Marrone and Vivimi with Biagio Antonacci.
- On 1 February 2014, On n'oublie jamais rien, on vit avec was performed instead of Come se non fosse stato mai amore and Je chante (Io canto) was performed in a French-Italian version.
- On 2 February 2014 On n'oublie jamais rien, on vit avec was performed instead of Come se non fosse stato mai amore and Je chante (Io canto) was performed in a French-Italian version.
- In all the shows in Brazil, the songs Invece no, Incancellabile and Le cose che vivi were performed in an Italian-Portuguese version. Moreover, the song Se fue was performed instead of Non c'è.
- On 20 February 2014, Io canto was performed in its Italian/French version instead of the solo Italian one. Also, due to technical problems, Dove resto solo io was not performed.
- In the end of her performance at the Viña del Mar International Song Festival, Pausini performed a fragment of the song Gracias a la Vida. This concert also was the first time Pausini performed the song "Quiero decirte que te amo" completely since the song was released in 2000.
- On 28 February 2014, Pausini performed the popular Mexican song Cielito Lindo before La soledad. Moreover, Pausini performed the songs Primavera Anticipada (It is my song), Volveré junto a ti and Entre tú y mil mares with Ximena Sariñana, Mario Sandoval and Aleks Syntek, respectively.
- On 2 March 2014, Pausini performed the song Vivimi with Biaggio Antonacci after Yo canto and the song Como si no nos hubieramos amado with Luis Fonsi after It's not goodbye.
- On 6 March 2014, Pausini performed the song Vivimi with Biaggio Antonacci, In assenza di te with the group Il Volo, Le cose che vivi/Tudo o que eu vivo with Ivete Sangalo, Smile with Gloria Estefan and Te amaré with Miguel Bosé.
- The song Mi rubi l'anima was performed for the first time ever with Raf on 18 May 2014, 20 years after Pausini shared the vocals with Raf in the same song, present in her debut album.
- After the first European and American legs of the tour, the songs Le cose che vivi and Las cosas que vives were no longer performed in the Portuguese/Italian and Portuguese/Spanish versions.

== Band ==
Band

- Nicola Peruch: Pianoforte
- Simone Bertolotti: keyboard
- Paolo Carta: electric guitar, musical direction
- Nicola Oliva: electric guitar
- Roberto Gallinelli: Bass guitar
- Carlos Hercules: drum kit
- Roberta Granà: backing vocal
- Monica Hill: backing vocal
- Gianluigi Fazio: backing vocal
- Salimata Ariane Diakite: backing vocal
- B.I.M. Orchestra: Strings

Strings B.I.M. Orchestra

- Violin: Marcello Sirignano, Luisiana Lorusso, Elena Floris, Giovanni De Rossi, Chiara Antonutti, Prisca Amori, Mario Gentili, Alessandra Xanto, Soichi Ichicawa.
- Viola: Adriane Ester Gallo, Claudia Mizzoni, Adriana Marinucci
- Cello: Giuseppe Tortora, Claudia Della Gatta

Choreography

- Cristian Ciccone: choreographer, dancer

== Tour dates ==
Date	City	Country	Venue
European Tour 2013–2014
5 December 2013	Pesaro	Italy	Adriatic Arena
8 December 2013	Rome	Italy	PalaLottomatica
9 December 2013	Rome	Italy	PalaLottomatica
11 December 2013	Rome	Italy	PalaLottomatica
13 December 2013	Rome	Italy	PalaLottomatica
16 December 2013	Milan	Italy	Mediolanum Forum
18 December 2013	Milan	Italy	Mediolanum Forum
19 December 2013	Milan	Italy	Mediolanum Forum
21 December 2013	Milan	Italy	Mediolanum Forum
22 December 2013	Milan	Italy	Mediolanum Forum
31 January 2014	Paris	France	Le Zénith
2 February 2014	Brussels	Belgium	Forest National
5 February 2014	Geneva	Switzerland	SEG Geneva Arena
6 February 2014	Zürich	Switzerland	Hallenstadion
8 February 2014	Madrid	Spain	Palacio de los Deportes
American Tour
19 February 2014	São Paulo	Brazil	Citibank Hall
20 February 2014	São Paulo	Brazil	Citibank Hall
22 February 2014	Buenos Aires	Argentina	Luna Park
24 February 2014^{[A]}	Viña del Mar	Chile	Anfiteatro de la Quinta Vergara
25 February 2014	Santiago	Chile	Movistar Arena
28 February 2014	Mexico City	Mexico	Arena Ciudad de México
2 March 2014	Miami	United States	James L. Knight International Center
6 March 2014	New York City	United States	The Theater at Madison Square Garden
9 March 2014	Orillia	Canada	Casino Rama
Summer Tour
29 April 2014	Torre del Lago Puccini	Italy	Gran Teatro all'Aperto Giacomo Puccini
2 May 2014	Verona	Italy	Verona Arena
3 May 2014	Verona	Italy	Verona Arena
10 May 2014	Taormina	Italy	Teatro Antico di Taormina
11 May 2014	Taormina	Italy	Teatro Antico di Taormina
13 May 2014	Taormina	Italy	Teatro Antico di Taormina
18 May 2014	Taormina	Italy	Teatro Antico di Taormina
7 June 2014^{[B]}	Valladolid	Spain	Plaza de toros
10 July 2014^{[C]}	Locarno	Switzerland	Piazza Grande
15 July 2014	Caserta	Italy	Reggia di Caserta
24 July 2014^{[D]}	Lima	Peru	Centro Cultural Deportivo
15 August 2014^{[E]}	Montecarlo	Principality of Monaco	Salle des Étoiles
9 September 2014	Verona	Italy	Verona Arena
North America
18 October 2014	Los Angeles	United States	The Greek Theatre
19 October 2014	Las Vegas	United States	Pearl Concert Theater at The Palms
23 October 2014	Chicago	United States	The Chicago Theatre
25 October 2014	Atlantic City	United States	Taj Mahal
26 October 2014	Mashantucket	United States	MGM Theatre at Foxwoods
14 November 2014	Tijuana	Mexico	Plaza de Toros Monumental
18 November 2014	Monterrey	Mexico	Monterrey Arena
21 November 2014	San Luis Potosí	Mexico	El Domo
22 November 2014	Guadalajara	Mexico	Telmex Auditorium
26 November 2014	Mérida	Mexico	Coliseo
28 November 2014	Mexico City	Mexico	Arena Ciudad de México
2015 Tour
13 February 2015	Melbourne	Australia	Margaret Court Arena
14 February 2015	Sydney	Australia	Qantas Credit Union Arena
17 February 2015	Moscow	Russia	Crocus City Hall
11 April 2015	Kleine Scheidegg	Switzerland	SnowpenAir
7 August 2015^{[F]}	Marbella	Spain	La Cantera de Nagüeles

Festivals and other miscellaneous performances
^{A} Viña del Mar International Song Festival
^{B} Valladolid Latino
^{C} Moon and Stars
^{D} Feria del Hogar: El Gran EStelar
^{E} Monte-Carlo Sporting Summer Festival
^{F} Starlite Festival

=== Box office ===
Dates	Cities	Venue	Tickets sold / Tickets available	Income in $
6 February 2014	Zurich	Hallenstadion	8,372 / 10,500 (83%)	866,650
19–20 February 2014	São Paulo	Citibank Hall	7.864 / 7.864 (100%)	706,290
6 March 2014	New York	The Theater at Madison Square Garden	4,767 / 4,955 (96%)	505,132
