= Fatti Sentire World Tour =

2018 concert tour by Laura Pausini

- Tour by Laura Pausini
- Promotional poster for the tour
- Associated album: Fatti sentire
- Start date: 13 July 2018
- End date: 31 December 2018
- Legs: 3
- No. of shows: 36 in Europe; 17 in the Americas; 53 in total

Laura Pausini concert chronology
- Simili Tour (2016); Fatti Sentire World Tour (2018)

The Fatti Sentire World Tour (also known as the Hazte Sentir World Tour and the Fatti sentire–Worldwide Tour) was the ninth concert tour by Italian singer Laura Pausini. The tour supported her thirteenth studio album, Fatti sentire (2018). She performed 53 shows in Europe and the Americas.

== Background ==
After the general rehearsal on 13 July in Jesolo, the tour officially began with two concerts at the Circus Maximus in Rome on 21 and 22 July. After performing in Italy, Pausini started the American tour on 26 July in Miami, United States and ended the American leg on 31 August at the Radio City Music Hall in New York City. After performing in Italy between September and October, she performed in several European countries in October to return to Italy and finish the tour in Eboli. This was the first time that she presented herself in cities like Guayaquil in Ecuador and Brasília and Recife in Brazil. It is also the first time she returned to Guatemala after 21 years of absence. The tour ended officially in Monte Carlo on 31 December 2018.

== Opening acts ==
- Virginio Simonelli (Rome—21 July)
- Edwyn Roberts (Rome—21 July)
- Daniel Vuletic (Rome—21 July)
- Tony Maiello (Rome—22 July)
- Giulia Anania (Rome—22 July)
- Enrico Nigiotti (Rome—22 July)

== Setlist ==
The following setlist was obtained from the concert held on 21 July 2018, at Circo Massimo in Rome, Italy. It does not represent all shows for the duration of the tour.

1. "Non è detto
2. "E.STA.A.TE
3. Pop medley: "Primavera in anticipo (It Is My Song)" / "La mia risposta" / "Le cose che vivi"
4. "Frasi a metà
5. "Incancellabile"
6. "Simili"
7. Cosa Radio Finestre medley: "L'ultima cosa che ti devo" / "Con la musica alla radio" / "Le due finestre"
8. "Resta in ascolto"
9. Hits medley: "Lato destro del cuore" / "Non ho mai smesso" / "La solitudine"
10. "Fantastico (Fai quello che sei)"
11. "La soluzione"
12. Rock medley: "Ho creduto a me" / "Il caso è chiuso" / "Un'emergenza d'amore"
13. "Il coraggio di andare"
14. "E ritorno da te"
15. "Tra te e il mare"
16. Acoustic medley: "Limpido" / "Benvenuto" / "Strani amori" / "Non c'è"
17. "Come se non fosse stato mai amore"
18. "Vivimi"
19. Vale Passione Canto medley: "Una storia che vale" / "Benedetta passione" / "Io canto"
20. "Nuevo"
21. "Invece no"
22. Reggaetón medley: "Nadie ha dicho" / "Innamorata / "E.STA.A.TE" (Reprise)

== Tour dates ==
Date	City	Country	Venue
Europe
13 July 2018	Jesolo	Italy	PalaArrex
21 July 2018	Rome	Italy	Circo Massimo
22 July 2018	Rome	Italy	Circo Massimo
America
26 July 2018	Miami	United States	James L. Knight Center
28 July 2018	Los Angeles	United States	Greek Theatre
31 July 2018	Monterrey	Mexico	Arena Monterrey
2 August 2018	Zapopan	Mexico	Auditorio Telmex
4 August 2018	Mexico City	Mexico	Arena Ciudad de México
6 August 2018	Guatemala City	Guatemala	Fórum Majadas
8 August 2018	San José	Costa Rica	Estadio Nacional
11 August 2018	Guayaquil	Ecuador	Coliseo Voltaire
14 August 2018	Lima	Peru	Jockey Club del Perú
16 August 2018	Buenos Aires	Argentina	Estadio Luna Park
18 August 2018	Santiago	Chile	Movistar Arena
20 August 2018	São Paulo	Brazil	Citibank Hall
21 August 2018	São Paulo	Brazil	Citibank Hall
23 August 2018	Brasília	Brazil	Centro de Convenções
25 August 2018	Olinda	Brazil	Classic Hall
27 August 2018	Curitiba	Brazil	Teatro Positivo
31 August 2018	New York City	United States	Radio City Music Hall
Europe
8 September 2018	Milan	Italy	Mediolanum Forum
9 September 2018	Milan	Italy	Mediolanum Forum
11 September 2018	Milan	Italy	Mediolanum Forum
12 September 2018	Milan	Italy	Mediolanum Forum
15 September 2018	Ancona	Italy	PalaPrometeo
17 September 2018	Rimini	Italy	RDS Stadium
19 September 2018	Verona	Italy	Arena di Verona
21 September 2018	Verona	Italy	Arena di Verona
22 September 2018	Verona	Italy	Arena di Verona
28 September 2018	Acireale	Italy	Pal'Art Hotel
29 September 2018	Acireale	Italy	Pal'Art Hotel
1 October 2018	Bari	Italy	PalaFlorio
2 October 2018	Bari	Italy	PalaFlorio
4 October 2018	Bari	Italy	PalaFlorio
6 October 2018	Florence	Italy	Nelson Mandela Forum
7 October 2018	Florence	Italy	Nelson Mandela Forum
9 October 2018	Padua	Italy	Kioene Arena
10 October 2018	Padua	Italy	Kioene Arena
12 October 2018	Casalecchio di Reno	Italy	Unipol Arena
13 October 2018	Casalecchio di Reno	Italy	Unipol Arena
17 October 2018	Barcelona	Spain	Palau Sant Jordi
18 October 2018	Madrid	Spain	WiZink Center
20 October 2018	Paris	France	Zénith Paris
21 October 2018	Brussels	Belgium	Forest National
23 October 2018	Stuttgart	Germany	Porsche-Arena
24 October 2018	Zürich	Switzerland	Hallenstadion
26 October 2018	Turin	Italy	Pala Alpitour
27 October 2018	Turin	Italy	Pala Alpitour
30 October 2018	Rome	Italy	PalaLottomatica
31 October 2018	Rome	Italy	PalaLottomatica
3 November 2018	Eboli	Italy	PalaSele
4 November 2018	Eboli	Italy	PalaSele
31 December 2018	Monte Carlo	Monaco	Monte-Carlo Sporting

=== Box office score data ===
Venue	City	Tickets sold / Available	Gross revenue
James L. Knight Center	Miami	3,093 / 3,093 (100%)	$411,598
Citibank Hall	São Paulo	7,942 / 8,240 (96%)	$614,727

== Band ==
- Electric guitar and musical direction: Paolo Carta
- Electric and acoustic guitar: Nicola Oliva
- Piano: Fabio Coppini
- Keyboards: Andrea Rongioletti
- Drums: Carlos Hércules
- Bass: Roberto Gallinelli
- Percussion: Ernesto López
- Backing vocalist: Roberta Granà, Gianluigi Fazio, Mónica Hill, Claudia D'Ulisse, David Blank
