= 20 – The Greatest Hits (Laura Pausini album) =

20 – The Greatest Hits/20 – Grandes Exitos
- Italian-language edition

Compilation album by Laura Pausini
- Released: November 12, 2013
- Recorded: 1976–2013
- Genre: Latin pop
- Language: Italian, Spanish
- Label: Atlantic, Warner Music Group

Laura Pausini chronology
Inedito/Inédito (2011)	20 – The Greatest Hits/20 – Grandes Exitos (2013)	Simili/Similares (2015)

Alternative cover
- Spanish-language edition reissue

Singles from 20 – The Greatest Hits
- 1. "Limpido" Released: September 9, 2013; 2. "Se non te" Released: November 4, 2013; 3. "Dove resto solo io" Released: January 2014

Singles from 20 – Grandes Exitos
- 1. "Limpio" Released: September 9, 2013; 2. "Víveme" Released: December 4, 2013; 3. "Se fue" Released: January 2014; 4. "Donde quedo sólo yo" Released: August 19, 2014; 5. "Sino a ti" Released: August 26, 2014

20 – The Greatest Hits and 20 – Grandes Exitos are the second greatest hits albums by Italian singer Laura Pausini, released on November 12, 2013 by Warner Music Group. The Spanish-language edition received a Premio Lo Nuestro nomination for Pop Album of the Year.

== Background ==
On February 26, 2013, in order to celebrate the twentieth anniversary of her career, Pausini released a digital single including the original versions in Italian, Spanish and English of the song which launched her career in 1993, "La solitudine". The track was launched as a limited-edition single, available for purchase for a week only. Later during the same year, she confirmed that a greatest hits album will be released for the same purpose by December 2013.

Working on the album began in April 2013, with recording and photo-shooting sessions taking place up to August. The album was confirmed in May 2013.

On June 1, 2013 Pausini took part in the concert Chime for Change in London, supporting the global campaign of the same name for girls' and women's empowerment. Pausini performed the songs "Io canto" and "It's Not Goodbye". During the same year, she appeared as a featured artist on the track "Sonríe (Smile)", included in American singer Gloria Estefan's album The Standards. A new world tour has also been confirmed by Pausini through her official website. Starting from December 2013, Pausini will promote her greatest hits album with concerts in her native Italy, as well as in other European countries, in Latin America, in the United States and in Canada. The tour also includes a performance during the Viña del Mar International Song Festival in Chile.

On September 9, 2013, Pausini released a new single named "Limpido" (in Spanish, "Limpio"), in order to promote her new album. The song is a duet between Pausini and the Australian singer Kylie Minogue. On the same day, the name of the album was confirmed to be 20 – The Greatest Hits. "Limpido" is the first single released on 9 September 2013.

On September 20, 2013, Pausini posted the official cover of this new album in her Instagram account, created in order to share the image.

The track list of the album was unveiled on October 6, 2013, in Pausini's official fan club. This is Pausini's first studio album that contains tracks in all the languages she has sung up to the moment: Italian, Spanish, French, English and Portuguese.

The second single of the album, "Se non te", was released on November 4, 2013.

Other releases from the album include the singles "Dove resto solo io", "Se fue" (with Marc Anthony), "Víveme" (with Alejandro Sanz) and "Surrender", the last one being released only in Australia.

On July 22, 2014, Pausini confirmed that she would be one of the four coaches of the fourth season of the Mexican reality show and singing competition La Voz. She also confirmed that by September that same year she would release a special version of the album's Spanish version to the hispanophone market, in a special edition that would contain three new duets: with Thalía in Sino a ti, Alex Ubago in Donde quedo solo yo and Melendi in Entre tu y mil mares.

== Promotion ==
To promote both this new album and her twentieth career anniversary, Pausini will embark in a series of concert shows around the world, entitled "The Greatest Hits World Tour".

== Track listing ==
=== 20 – The Greatest Hits ===
CD1
No.	Title	Lyrics	Music	Album	Length
1.	"Ramaya"	Henrique Simone; Stan Regal		Amateur recording of Laura Pausini singing, 1976	0:25
2.	"La solitudine" (featuring Ennio Morricone) (new version 2013)	Federico Cavalli; Pietro Cremonesi	Angelo Valsiglio; Pietro Cremonesi	Laura Pausini (1993)	5:02
3.	"Non c'è/Se fue" (featuring Marc Anthony) (new version 2013)	Cavalli; Cremonesi; J. Badía	Valsiglio; Cremonesi	Laura Pausini (1993)	4:30
4.	"Gente" (new version 2013)	Cheope; Marco Marati	Valsiglio	Laura (1994)	3:48
5.	"Strani amori" (new version 2013)	Cheope; Marati; Francesco Tanini	Valsiglio; Roberto Buti	Laura (1994)	3:59
6.	"Incancellabile" (new version 2013)	Cheope	Giuseppe Carella; Fabrizio Baldoni; Gino de Stefani	Le cose che vivi (1996)	3:59
7.	"Le cose che vivi/Tudo o que eu vivo" (featuring Ivete Sangalo) (new version 2013)	Cheope; Fabrizio Pausini; Cláudio Rabello	Carella; Baldoni; de Stefani	Le cose che vivi (1996)	4:42
8.	"It's Not Goodbye" (new version 2013)	Laura Pausini; Cheope; Shelly Peiken	Antonio Galbiati	From the Inside (2002)	4:38
9.	"One More Time"	Richard Marx	Marx	Message in a Bottle: Music from and Inspired by the Motion Picture (1999)	4:21
10.	"Tra te e il mare" (new version 2013)	Biagio Antonacci	Antonacci	Tra te e il mare (2000)	4:17
11.	"Everyday Is a Monday" (2013 remastered version)	Andreas Carlsson; Alistair Thomson	Carlsson; Thomson	From the Inside (2002)	3:04
12.	"E ritorno da te" (new version 2013)	Pausini; Cheope	Daniel Vuletic	The Best of Laura Pausini: E ritorno da te (2001)	4:00
13.	"Surrender" (new version 2013)	Dane Deviller; Sean Hosein; Steven Smith; Anthony Anderson	Deviller; Hosein; Smith; Anderson	From the Inside (2002)	4:46
14.	"Vivimi/Víveme" (featuring Alejandro Sanz) (new version 2013)	Antonacci; Pausini; Badía	Antonacci	Resta in ascolto (2004)	3:54
15.	"Come se non fosse stato mai amore" (2013 remastered version)	Pausini; Cheope	Vuletic	Resta in ascolto (2004)	3:58
16.	"Mi abbandono a te" (2013 remastered version)	Madonna; Rick Nowels; Pausini	Madonna; Nowels	Resta in ascolto (2004)	4:41
17.	"Prendo te" (new version 2013)	Pausini	Pausini	Resta in ascolto (CD+DVD Limited Edition) (2004)	2:10
18.	"You'll Never Find Another Love Like Mine" (featuring Michael Bublé) (live at the Wiltern Theatre, Los Angeles, 2005)	Kenny Gamble; Leon Huff	Gamble; Huff	Caught in the Act (2005)

CD2
No.	Title	Lyrics	Music	Album	Length
1.	"She (Uguale a lei)" (new version 2013)	Charles Aznavour; Herbert Kretzmer; Pausini	Aznavour; Kretzmer	Non-album track released originally on 2005	3:07
2.	"Surrender to Love" (featuring Ray Charles)	Gordon Clifford; Harry Barris	Clifford; Barris	Genius & Friends (2005)	4:15
3.	"Io canto/Je chante" (featuring Lara Fabian) (new version 2013)	Marco Luberti; Jean-Pierre Lemaire	Riccardo Cocciante	Io canto (2006)	4:23
4.	"Vivere (Dare to Live)" (featuring Andrea Bocelli)	Gerardina Trovato; Angelo Anastasio; Celso Valli	Trovato; Anastasio; Valli	The Best of Andrea Bocelli: Vivere (2007)	4:15
5.	"Te amaré" (featuring Miguel Bosé)	Juan Carlos Calderón; Miguel Bosé	Calderón; Bosé	Papito (2007)	5:15
6.	"Ascolta il tuo cuore" (live at the San Siro stadium, 2 June 2007)	Cheope; F. Pausini	Vito Mastrofrancesco; Alberto Mastrofrancesco; Charles Cohiba	San Siro 2007	4:16
7.	"Paris au mois d'août" (featuring Charles Aznavour)	Aznavour; Georges Garvarentz	Aznavour; Georges Garvarentz	Duos (2008)	3:40
8.	"Invece no" (2013 remastered version)	Pausini; Nicollò Agliardi	Pausini; Paolo Carta	Primavera in anticipo (2008)	3:54
9.	"Primavera in anticipo (It Is My Song)" (featuring James Blunt) (2013 remastered version)	Pausini; Cheope; James Blunt	Vuletic	Primavera in anticipo (2008)	3:28
10.	"Con la musica alla radio" (new version 2013)	Pausini; Cheope	Vuletic	Laura Live World Tour 09 (2009)	4:56
11.	"Un'emergenza d'amore" (live at the Lincoln Center, New York City, 2009)	Pausini; Cheope; Massimo Pacciani	Eric Buffat	recorded live from the LP World Tour (2009)	4:10
12.	"Non ho mai smesso" (2013 remastered version)	Pausini; Agliardi	Pausini; Carta	Inedito (2011)	3:23
13.	"Benvenuto" (2013 remastered version)	Pausini; Agliardi	Pausini; Carta	Inedito (2011)	3:57
14.	"Celeste" (2013 remastered version)	Pausini; Beppe Dati	Dati; Goffredo Orlandi	Inedito (2011)	4:10
15.	"Paola 2013"			Amateur recording of Paola Carta (Pausini's daughter) saying the word "mamma", from 2013	0:05
16.	"Resta in ascolto/Escucha atento" (live at Royal Albert Hall, London, 22 May 2012)	Pausini; Cheope; Badía	Vuletic	recorded live from the Inedito World Tour (2011–2012)	3:31
17.	"Dove resto solo io"	Pausini; Virginio Simonelli	Pausini	new song	3:37
18.	"Limpido" (solo version)	Pausini; Simonelli	Pausini	new song	3:27
19.	"Se non te"	Pausini; Agliardi	Pausini; Carta	new song	4:05
20.	"Limpido" (featuring Kylie Minogue) (Italian – English version)	Pausini; Simonelli	Pausini	new song	3:27

=== 20 – Grandes Exitos ===
==== Standard Edition ====
CD1
No.	Title	Lyrics	Music	Album	Length
1.	"Ramaya"	Henrique Simone; Stan Regal		Amateur recording of Laura Pausini singing, from 1976	0:25
2.	"La soledad" (featuring Ennio Morricone) (new version 2013)	Federico Cavalli; Pietro Cremonesi; Badía	Angelo Valsiglio; Pietro Cremonesi	Laura Pausini (1994)	5:02
3.	"Se fue" (featuring Marc Anthony) (new version 2013)	Cavalli; Cremonesi; Badía	Valsiglio; Cremonesi	Laura Pausini (1994)	4:30
4.	"Gente" (new version 2013)	Cheope; Marco Marati; Badía	Valsiglio	Laura Pausini (1994)	3:48
5.	"Amores extraños" (new version 2013)	Cheope; Marati; Francesco Tanini; Badía	Valsiglio; Roberto Buti	Laura Pausini (1994)	4:58
6.	"Inolvidable" (new version 2013)	Cheope; Badía	Giuseppe Carella; Fabrizio Baldoni; Gino de Stefani	Las cosas que vives (1996)	3:59
7.	"Las cosas que vives/Tudo o que eu vivo" (featuring Ivete Sangalo) (new version 2013)	Cheope; Fabrizio Pausini; Badía; Cláudio Rabelo	Carella; Baldoni; de Stefani	Las cosas que vives (1996)	4:42
8.	"En ausencia de ti" (new version 2013)	Laura Pausini; Cheope; badía	Antonio Galbiati	Mi respuesta (1996)	4:40
9.	"One More Time"	Richard Marx	Marx	Message in a Bottle: Music from and Inspired by the Motion Picture (1999)	4:21
10.	"Entre tú y mil mares" (new version 2013)	Biagio Antonacci; Badía	Antonacci	Entre tú y mil mares (2000)	4:17
11.	"Everyday Is a Monday" (2013 remastered version)	Andreas Carlsson; Alistair Thomson	Carlsson; Thomson	From the Inside (2002)	3:04
12.	"Volveré junto a ti" (new version 2013)	Pausini; Cheope; Badía	Daniel Vuletic	Lo mejor de Laura Pausini: Volveré junto a ti (2001)	4:00
13.	"Surrender" (new version 2013)	Dane Deviller; Sean Hosein; Steven Smith; Anthony Anderson	Deviller; Hosein; Smith; Anderson	From the Inside (2002)	4:46
14.	"Víveme" (featuring Alejandro Sanz) (new version 2013)	Antonacci; Pausini; Badía	Antonacci	Escucha (2004)	3:54
15.	"Como si no nos hubiéramos amado" (2013 remastered version)	Pausini; Cheope; León Tristán	Vuletic	Escucha (2004)	3:58
16.	"Me abandono a ti" (2013 remastered version)	Madonna; Rick Nowels; Pausini	Madonna; Nowels	Escucha (2004)	4:41
17.	"Prendo te" (new version 2013)	Pausini	Pausini	Resta in ascolto (CD+DVD Limited Edition) (2004)	2:10
18.	"You'll Never Find Another Love Like Mine" (featuring Michael Bublé) (live at the Wiltern Theatre, Los Angeles, 2005)	Kenny Gamble; Leon Huff	Gamble; Huff	Caught in the Act (2005)	3:42

CD2
No.	Title	Lyrics	Music	Album	Length
1.	"She (Uguale a lei)" (new version 2013)	Charles Aznavour; Herbert Kretzmer; Pausini	Aznavour; Kretzmer	Non-album track released originally on 2005	3:07
2.	"Surrender to Love" (featuring Ray Charles)	Gordon Clifford; Harry Barris	Clifford; Barris	Genius & Friends (2005)	4:15
3.	"Dispárame, dispara" (2013 remastered version)	Samuele Bersani; Lucio Dalla; Ortiz; Pausini	Bersani; Giuseppe d'Onghia	Yo canto (2006)	4:10
4.	"Vive Ya (Vivere)" (featuring Andrea Bocelli)	Gerardina Trovato; Angelo Anastasio; Celso Valli	Trovato; Anastasio; Valli	The Best of Andrea Bocelli: Vivere (2007)	4:15
5.	"Te amaré" (featuring Miguel Bosé)	Juan Carlos Calderón; Miguel Bosé	Calderón; Bosé	Papito (2007)	5:15
6.	"Ascolta il tuo cuore" (live at the San Siro stadium, 2 June 2007)	Cheope; F. Pausini	Vito Mastrofrancesco; Alberto Mastrofrancesco; Charles Cohiba	San Siro 2007	4:16
7.	"Paris au mois d'août" (featuring Charles Aznavour)	Aznavour; Georges Garvarentz	Aznavour; Georges Garvarentz	Duos (2008)	3:40
8.	"En cambio no" (2013 remastered version)	Pausini; Nicollò Agliardi; Jorge Ballesteros	Pausini; Paolo Carta	Primavera anticipada (2008)	3:54
9.	"Primavera anticipada (It Is My Song)" (featuring James Blunt) (2013 remastered version)	Pausini; Cheope; James Blunt; Ignacio Ballesteros	Vuletic	Primavera anticipada (2008)	3:28
10.	"Con la música en la radio" (new version 2013)	Pausini; Cheope; J. Ballesteros	Vuletic	Laura Live World Tour 09 (2009)	4:56
11.	"Un'emergenza d'amore" (live at the Lincoln Center, New York City, 2009)	Pausini; Cheope; Massimo Pacciani	Eric Buffat	recorded live from the LP World Tour (2009)	4:10
12.	"Jamás abandoné" (2013 remastered version)	Pausini; Agliardi; J. Ballesteros	Pausini; Carta	Inédito (2011)	3:23
13.	"Bienvenido" (2013 remastered version)	Pausini; Agliardi; J. Ballesteros	Pausini; Carta	Inédito (2011)	3:57
14.	"Así celeste" (2013 remastered version)	Pausini; Beppe Dati; J. Ballesteros	Dati; Goffredo Orlandi	Inédito (2011)	4:03
15.	"Paola 2013"			Amateur recording of Paola Carta saying the word "mamma"	0:05
16.	"Resta in ascolto/Escucha atento" (live at Royal Albert Hall, London, 22 May 2012)	Pausini; Cheope; Badía	Vuletic	recorded live from the Inedito World Tour (2011–2012)	3:31
17.	"Donde quedo solo yo"	Pausini; Virginio Simonelli; J. Ballesteros	Pausini	new song	3:37
18.	"Limpio" (solo version)	Pausini; Simonelli; J. Ballesteros	Pausini	new song	3:27
19.	"Sino a ti"	Pausini; Agliardi; J. Ballesteros	Pausini; Carta	new song	4:05
20.	"Limpio" (featuring Kylie Minogue) (Spanglish version)	Pausini; Simonelli; J. Ballesteros	Pausini	new song	3:27

==== Reissue ====
CD1
No.	Title	Lyrics	Music	Album	Length
1.	"Ramaya"	Henrique Simone; Stan Regal		Amateur recording of Laura Pausini singing, from 1976	0:25
2.	"La soledad" (featuring Ennio Morricone) (new version 2013)	Federico Cavalli; Pietro Cremonesi; Badía	Angelo Valsiglio; Pietro Cremonesi	Laura Pausini (1994)	5:02
3.	"Se fue" (featuring Marc Anthony) (new version 2013)	Cavalli; Cremonesi; Badía	Valsiglio; Cremonesi	Laura Pausini (1994)	4:30
4.	"Gente" (new version 2013)	Cheope; Marco Marati; Badía	Valsiglio	Laura Pausini (1994)	3:48
5.	"Amores extraños" (new version 2013)	Cheope; Marati; Francesco Tanini; Badía	Valsiglio; Roberto Buti	Laura Pausini (1994)	4:58
6.	"Inolvidable" (new version 2013)	Cheope; Badía	Giuseppe Carella; Fabrizio Baldoni; Gino de Stefani	Las cosas que vives (1996)	3:59
7.	"Las cosas que vives/Tudo o que eu vivo" (featuring Ivete Sangalo) (new version 2013)	Cheope; Fabrizio Pausini; Badía; Cláudio Rabelo	Carella; Baldoni; de Stefani	Las cosas que vives (1996)	4:42
8.	"En ausencia de ti" (new version 2013)	Laura Pausini; Cheope; badía	Antonio Galbiati	Mi respuesta (1996)	4:40
9.	"One More Time"	Richard Marx	Marx	Message in a Bottle: Music from and Inspired by the Motion Picture (1999)	4:21
10.	"Entre tú y mil mares" (featuring Melendi) (new version 2013)	Biagio Antonacci; Badía	Antonacci	Entre tú y mil mares (2000)	4:17
11.	"Everyday Is a Monday" (2013 remastered version)	Andreas Carlsson; Alistair Thomson	Carlsson; Thomson	From the Inside (2002)	3:04
12.	"Volveré junto a ti" (new version 2013)	Pausini; Cheope; Badía	Daniel Vuletic	Lo mejor de Laura Pausini: Volveré junto a ti (2001)	4:00
13.	"Surrender" (new version 2013)	Dane Deviller; Sean Hosein; Steven Smith; Anthony Anderson	Deviller; Hosein; Smith; Anderson	From the Inside (2002)	4:46
14.	"Víveme" (featuring Alejandro Sanz) (new version 2013)	Antonacci; Pausini; Badía	Antonacci	Escucha (2004)	3:54
15.	"Como si no nos hubiéramos amado" (2013 remastered version)	Pausini; Cheope; León Tristán	Vuletic	Escucha (2004)	3:58
16.	"Me abandono a ti" (2013 remastered version)	Madonna; Rick Nowels; Pausini	Madonna; Nowels	Escucha (2004)	4:41
17.	"Prendo te" (new version 2013)	Pausini	Pausini	Resta in ascolto (CD+DVD Limited Edition) (2004)	2:10
18.	"You'll Never Find Another Love Like Mine" (featuring Michael Bublé) (live at the Wiltern Theatre, Los Angeles, 2005)	Kenny Gamble; Leon Huff	Gamble; Huff	Caught in the Act (2005)	3:42

CD2
No.	Title	Lyrics	Music	Album	Length
1.	"She (Uguale a lei)" (new version 2013)	Charles Aznavour; Herbert Kretzmer; Pausini	Aznavour; Kretzmer	Non-album track released originally on 2005	3:07
2.	"Surrender to Love" (featuring Ray Charles)	Gordon Clifford; Harry Barris	Clifford; Barris	Genius & Friends (2005)	4:15
3.	"Dispárame, dispara" (2013 remastered version)	Samuele Bersani; Lucio Dalla; Ortiz; Pausini	Bersani; Giuseppe d'Onghia	Yo canto (2006)	4:10
4.	"Vive Ya (Vivere)" (featuring Andrea Bocelli)	Gerardina Trovato; Angelo Anastasio; Celso Valli	Trovato; Anastasio; Valli	The Best of Andrea Bocelli: Vivere (2007)	4:15
5.	"Te amaré" (featuring Miguel Bosé)	Juan Carlos Calderón; Miguel Bosé	Calderón; Bosé	Papito (2007)	5:15
6.	"Ascolta il tuo cuore" (live at the San Siro stadium, 2 June 2007)	Cheope; F. Pausini	Vito Mastrofrancesco; Alberto Mastrofrancesco; Charles Cohiba	San Siro 2007	4:16
7.	"Paris au mois d'août" (featuring Charles Aznavour)	Aznavour; Georges Garvarentz	Aznavour; Georges Garvarentz	Duos (2008)	3:40
8.	"En cambio no" (2013 remastered version)	Pausini; Nicollò Agliardi; Jorge Ballesteros	Pausini; Paolo Carta	Primavera anticipada (2008)	3:54
9.	"Primavera anticipada (It Is My Song)" (featuring James Blunt) (2013 remastered version)	Pausini; Cheope; James Blunt; Ignacio Ballesteros	Vuletic	Primavera anticipada (2008)	3:28
10.	"Con la música en la radio" (new version 2013)	Pausini; Cheope; J. Ballesteros	Vuletic	Laura Live World Tour 09 (2009)	4:56
11.	"Un'emergenza d'amore" (live at the Lincoln Center, New York City, 2009)	Pausini; Cheope; Massimo Pacciani	Eric Buffat	recorded live from the LP World Tour (2009)	4:10
12.	"Jamás abandoné" (2013 remastered version)	Pausini; Agliardi; J. Ballesteros	Pausini; Carta	Inédito (2011)	3:23
13.	"Bienvenido" (2013 remastered version)	Pausini; Agliardi; J. Ballesteros	Pausini; Carta	Inédito (2011)	3:57
14.	"Así celeste" (2013 remastered version)	Pausini; Beppe Dati; J. Ballesteros	Dati; Goffredo Orlandi	Inédito (2011)	4:03
15.	"Paola 2013"			Amateur recording of Paola Carta saying the word "mamma"	0:05
16.	"Resta in ascolto/Escucha atento" (live at Royal Albert Hall, London, 22 May 2012)	Pausini; Cheope; Badía	Vuletic	recorded live from the Inedito World Tour (2011–2012)	3:31
17.	"Donde quedo solo yo" (featuring Alex Ubago)	Pausini; Virginio Simonelli; J. Ballesteros	Pausini	new song	3:37
18.	"Limpio" (solo version)	Pausini; Simonelli; J. Ballesteros	Pausini	new song	3:27
19.	"Sino a ti" (featuring Thalía)	Pausini; Agliardi; J. Ballesteros	Pausini; Carta	new song	4:05
20.	"Limpio" (featuring Kylie Minogue) (Spanglish version)	Pausini; Simonelli; J. Ballesteros	Pausini	new song	3:27

=== Bonus tracks ===
iTunes bonus track
No.	Title	Lyrics	Music	Album	Length
21.	"In assenza di te" (new version 2013)	Pausini; Cheope	Pausini	La mia risposta (1998)

== Song info ==
Both versions of the album contain 38 tracks (18 in the first CD and 20 in the second one). Among which:

- 3 ("Limpido / Limpio", "Se non te / Sino a ti" and "Dove resto solo io / Donde quedo solo yo") are completely new and written for this album (all these three tracks were chosen as the singles of the album).
  - The first single of the album, "Limpido / Limpio", is included in its solo and duet versions with Kylie Minogue.
- 2 ("Ramaya" and "Paola") are amateur recordings of Laura Pausini singing the famous song "Ramaya" when she was two years old (the former) and her daughter saying the word "mamma" (mommy) for the first time (the latter).
- 4 ("You'll Never Find Another Love Like Mine", the Italian/Spanish language "Resta in Ascolto/Escucha Atento", "Un'emergenza d'amore" and "Ascolta il tuo cuore") of them are live recordings of Pausini during her previous world tours, except the first one, which was taken from Michael Bublé's live album "Caught in the Act".
- 4 ("You'll Never Find Another Love Like Mine", "Te amaré", "Paris au mois d'août" and "Dare to live (Vivere)") are duets that Pausini performed with other singers but that were never included in any of her albums. The duets are with Michael Bublé, Miguel Bosé, Charles Aznavour and Andrea Bocelli, respectively.
- 14 are old songs which were revisited.
  - From these 14, 5 are songs in which Laura Pausini shares the vocals with another singer. With exception of "La solitudine", Ennio Morricone doesn't sing, but conducts the orchestra that plays in the song.
- The album's standard Italian edition contains 6 multilingual songs:
  - 1 track in Italian/Portuguese
  - 3 tracks in Italian/Spanish
  - 1 track in Italian/French
  - 2 tracks in Italian/English

== Singles ==
Singles
20 – The Greatest Hits
Name	Release date
Limpido (duet with Kylie Minogue)	9 September 2013
Se non te	4 November 2013
20 – Grandes Exitos
Name	Release date
Limpio (duet with Kylie Minogue)	9 September 2013
Víveme (duet with Alejandro Sanz)	1 January 2014

Music videos
Name	Director
Limpido (duet with Kylie Minogue)	Gaetano Morbioli
Limpio (duet with Kylie Minogue)	Gaetano Morbioli
Se non te	Gaetano Morbioli
Víveme (duet with Alejandro Sanz)	Gaetano Morbioli
Dove resto solo io	Gaetano Morbioli
Se fue (duet with Marc Anthony)	Leandro Manuel Emede, Nicolò Cerioni
Donde quedo solo yo (duet with Alex Ubago)	Gaetano Morbioli
Sino a ti (duet with Thalía)	Leandro Manuel Emede, Nicolò Cerioni
Entre tú y mil mares (duet with Melendi)	Leandro Manuel Emede, Nicolò Cerioni

== Charts ==
=== Weekly charts ===
Chart (2013)	Peak position
Belgian Albums (Ultratop Flanders)	39
Belgian Albums (Ultratop Wallonia)	12
Brazilian Albums (ABPD)	2
Croatian Foreign Albums (IFPI)	2
Dutch Albums (Album Top 100)	53
Hungarian Albums (MAHASZ)	32
Italian Albums (FIMI)	1
Mexican Albums (AMPROFON)	5
Spanish Albums (Promusicae)	6
Slovenian Albums Chart (Top 30)	10
Swiss Albums (Schweizer Hitparade)	8
US Top Latin Albums (Billboard)	14
US Latin Pop Albums (Billboard)	4

=== Year-end charts ===
Chart (2013)	Position
Italian Albums (FIMI)	9
Chart (2014)	Position
Belgian Albums (Ultratop Wallonia)	87
Italian Albums (FIMI)	18
Chart (2015)	Position
Spanish Albums (PROMUSICAE)	78

== Certifications and sales ==
Region	Certification	Certified units/sales
Italy (FIMI)	3× Platinum	180,000^{*}
Mexico (AMPROFON)	Gold	30,000^{^}
Spain (Promusicae)	Gold	20,000^{^}
Switzerland (IFPI Switzerland)	Gold	10,000^{^}
^{*} Sales figures based on certification alone.^{^} Shipments figures based on certification alone.
