= Palacio de Deportes de la Comunidad de Madrid =

Multipurpose venue in Madrid

Movistar Arena
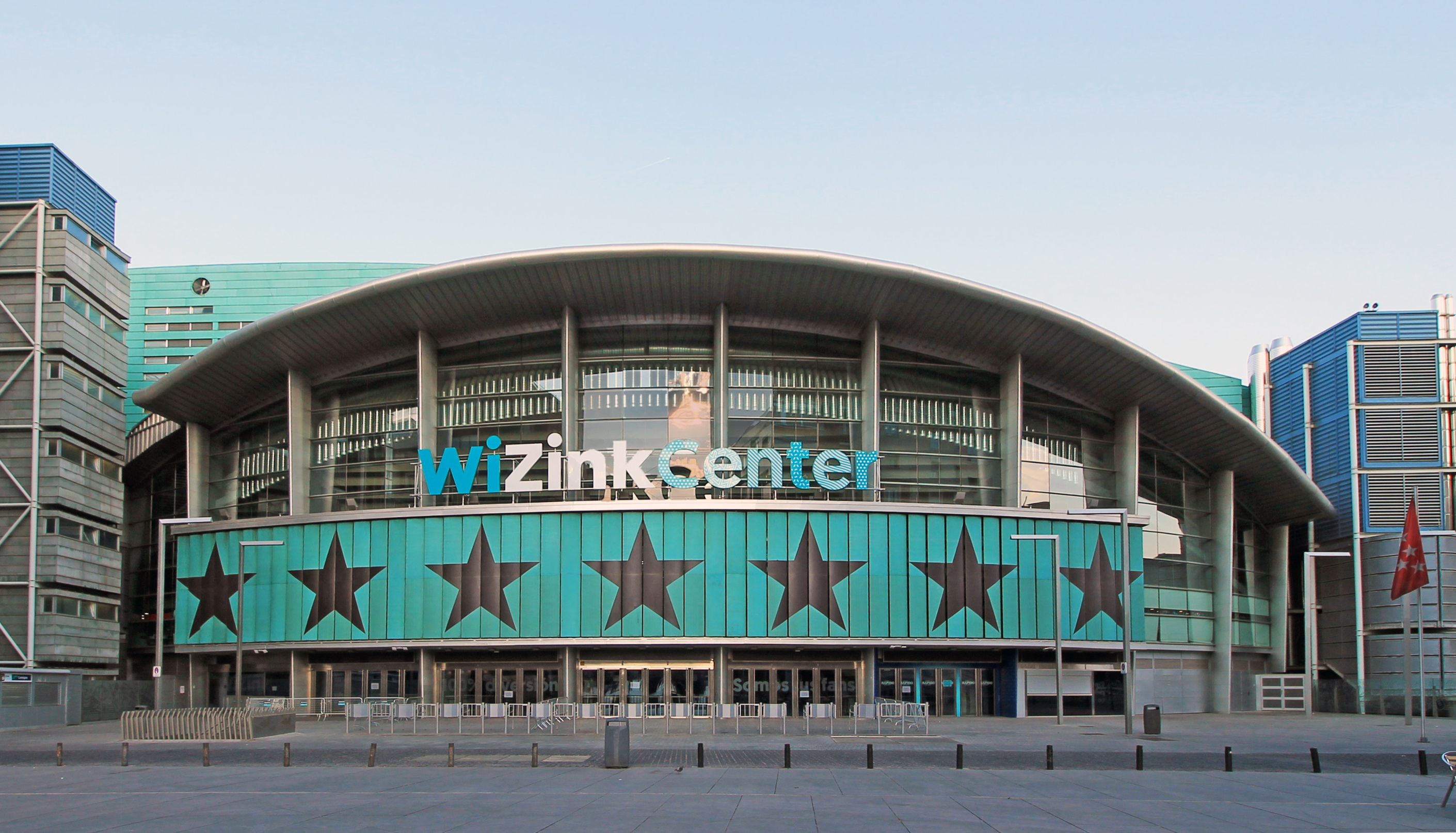
- Exterior of venue, then known as WiZink Center (c.2018)
- Interactive map of Movistar Arena
- Former names: Palacio de Deportes (1960–85); Palacio de Deportes de la Comunidad de Madrid (1985–2001; 2005–14); Barclaycard Center (2014–16); WiZink Center (2016–24)
- Address: Avenida Felipe II
- Location: Madrid, Spain
- Coordinates: 40°25′26″N 3°40′18″W
- Owner: ARPROMA
- Operator: Impulsa Eventos e Instalaciones SA
- Capacity: 15,000 Sports: Athletics: 10,000; Handball: 14,000; Basketball: 15,000; Boxing: 16,000; Concerts: The Box: 3,360; The Ring: 5,630; Ring Plus: 8,706; Reserved: 13,000; End-stage: 15,500; General admission: 17,453
- Public transit: Madrid Metro: at Goya at O'Donnell

Construction
- Opened: 8 January 1960
- Closed: 29 June 2001
- Reopened: 19 February 2005
- Cost: ESP 56 million
- Architects: José Soteras; Lorenzo García Barbón

Tenants
- Real Madrid; CB Estudiantes

Website
- Official website
- Building details

General information
- Renovated: 20 February 2002 – 15 February 2005
- Renovation cost: €124 million

Renovating team
- Architects: Enrique Hermoso; Pilar Huidobro
- Structural engineer: TPF Getinsa Euroestudios
- Services engineer: Geasyt Internacional
- Civil engineer: AEPO
- Other designers: MC2; BBM; Waagner-Biro
- Quantity surveyor: Intemac
- Main contractor: Necso Entrecanales Cubiertas; FCC

Sports Palace of the Community of Madrid or simply Madrid Sports Palace (Spanish: Palacio de Deportes de la Comunidad de Madrid), officially Movistar Arena since January 2025 for sponsorship reasons, is an indoor sporting arena located in Madrid, Spain.

The former building, which was built in 1960, was destroyed by a fire in 2001. Architects Enrique Hermoso and Paloma Huidobro projected a High-Tech style new arena that was built at the same location between 2002 and 2005.

The arena hosted two major international basketball events in the first decade of the 21st century – the knockout stage of EuroBasket 2007 and will host once again in 2029, the EuroLeague’s Final Four 2008. It also hosted the final stage of the Copa del Rey of basketball in 2006, 2009, 2011, 2019 and 2021. The arena was the finals venue for the 2014 FIBA Basketball World Cup and the Euroleague Final Four 2015.

== History ==
=== Origins (1874–1960) ===
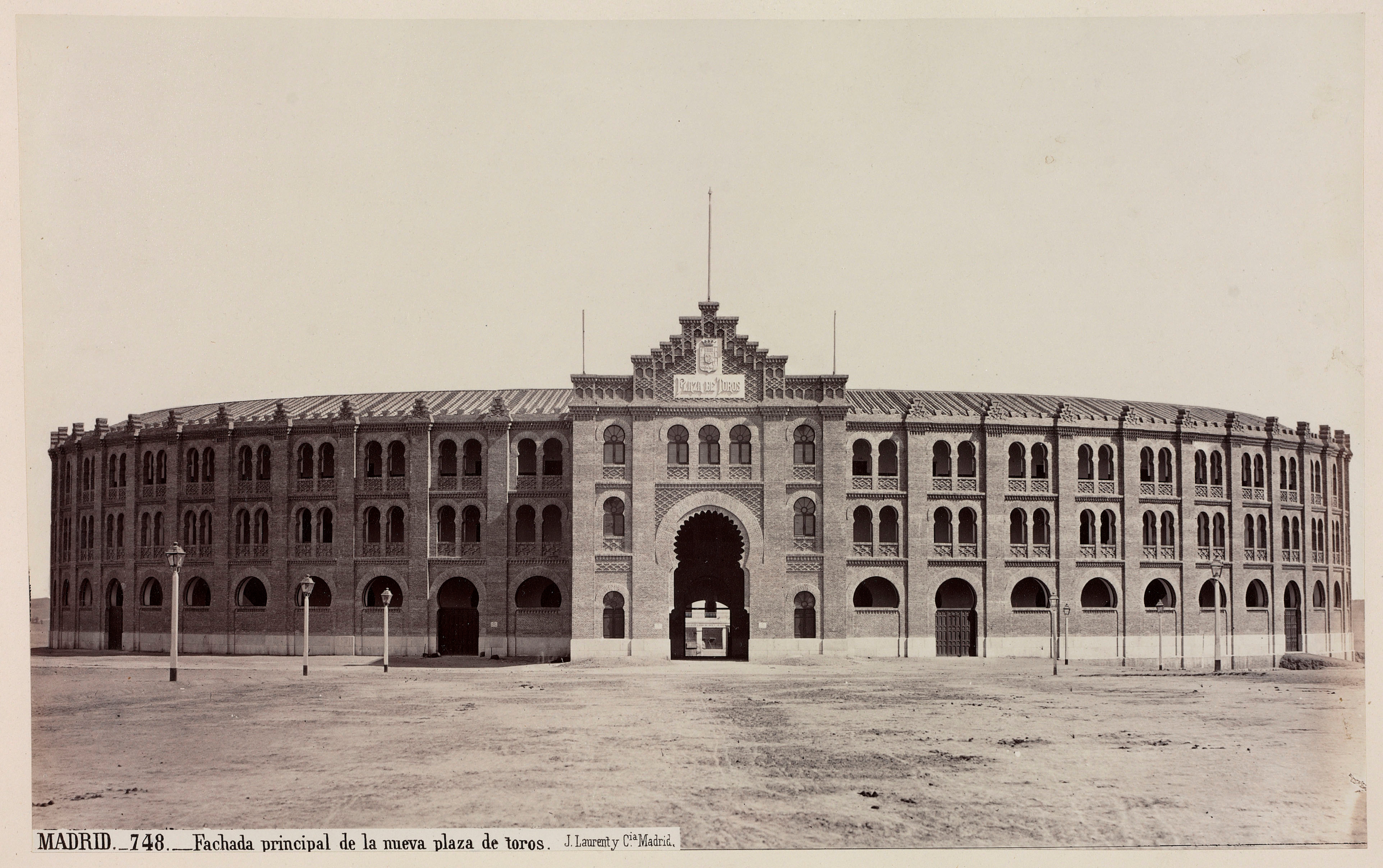
The Goya bullring (1874), by Laurent

Until the late 19th century, the area where the Sports Centre was an area of orchards on the perimeter of the city, in Goya street below, the edge of the extension that had been done at the behest of Marques de Salamanca. In 1872 the then mayor of Madrid, the Count of Toreno, laid the foundation stone of a new bullring, since the old, located next to the Puerta de Alcalá, was demolished for the construction of new neighbourhood. Two years later, on 4 September 1874 the mayor inaugurated the bullring, built in a neomudéjar style and designed by architects Álvarez Lorenzo Capra and Emilio Rodríguez Ayuso.

Due to increasing population of the city and the great love of bullfighting existing in Madrid, the bullring was deemed small and 1931 a new bullring was inaugurated, the Monumental de las Ventas next to the Abroñigal stream. For three years the new bullring was virtually unused and bullfights were still held at Goya. The last was held on 14 October 1934. A week later, on 21 October, was formally inaugurated the Plaza de Las Ventas. La Plaza de Goya street history of the Palace of Sport was demolished a few days later.

The site remained empty for years given the state of penury in which the country found itself after the Civil War and the postwar years. Finally, 1952, Mayor José María Gutiérrez del Castillo promoted the construction of an indoor arena such as already exist in other European capitals. In 1953 a competition was held for the completion of the palace. In 1956, the National Sports Delegation, Opted for the project by architects José Soteras and Lorenzo García Barbon, authors Palacio de los Deportes de Barcelona opened a year ago to host the Mediterranean Games held in the city.

=== First venue (1960–2001) ===
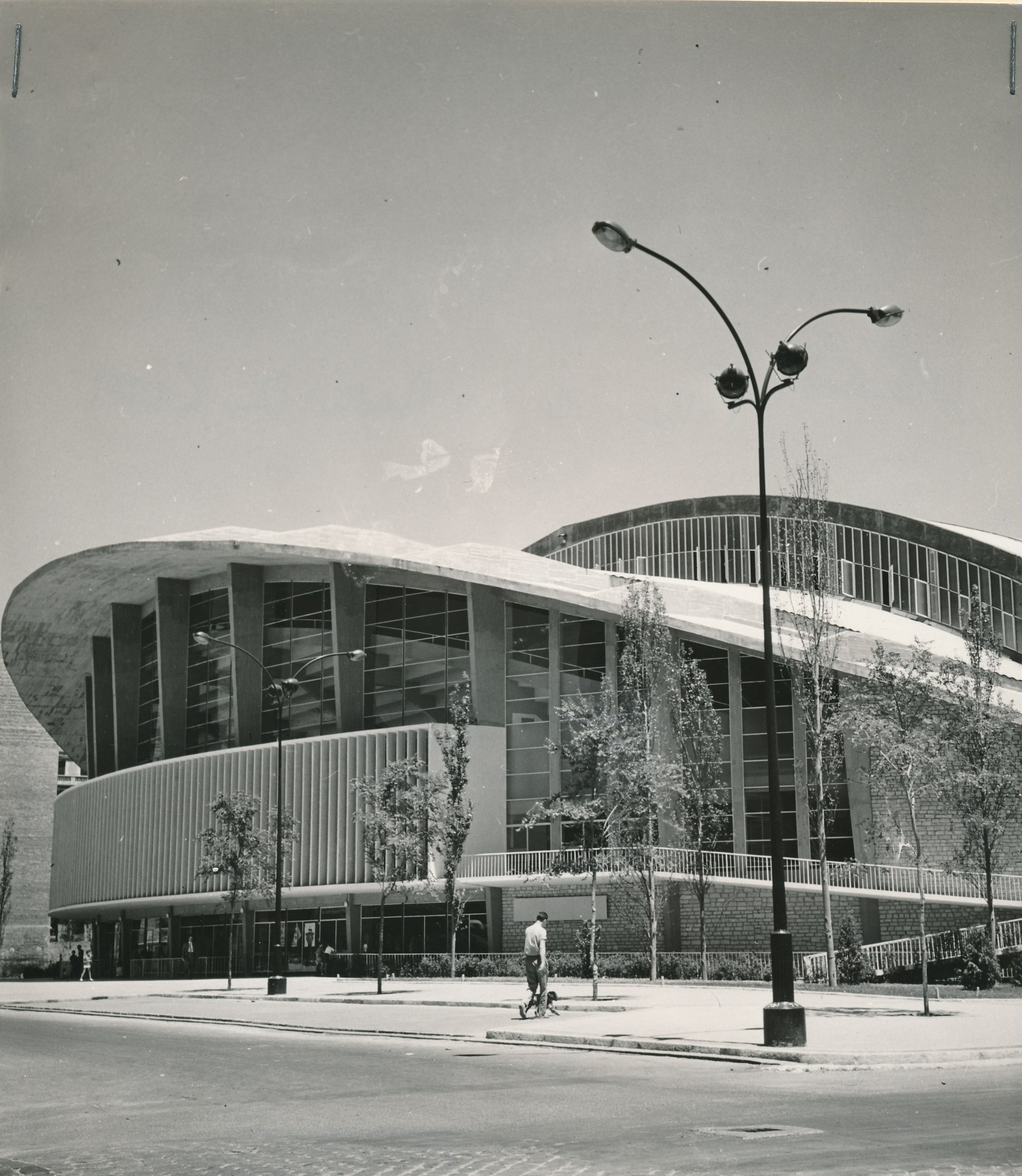
The building in 1961

The project of the Sports Palace was a circular building 115 m in diameter, built of reinforced concrete and metal sheath. The work cost 56 million pesetas.

The original capacity was 10,000 to 16,000 depending on the configuration of grades and activities that develop inside. Thus, for example, to test the capacity cycling was 10,609 and 16,137 boxing bouts.

The palace was inaugurated in 1960. In 1969, it was expanded with basketball courts, cycling, hockey and athletics. In 1985, ownership of the Palace was transferred to the regional administration of the Community of Madrid, who undertook a comprehensive reform of the building.

During the 41-year life of this first Palacio de los Deportes gathered inside a number of sports competitions: basketball, athletics, boxing, handball, martial arts, cycling and gymnastics as well as equestrian, skating, hockey and up trial. Hosted the Real Madrid from 1986 until 1998 and Estudiantes form 1987 until the fire.

On 28 June 2001, the Sports Centre suffered a fire and was in ruins.

=== Rebuilt venue (2005–present) ===
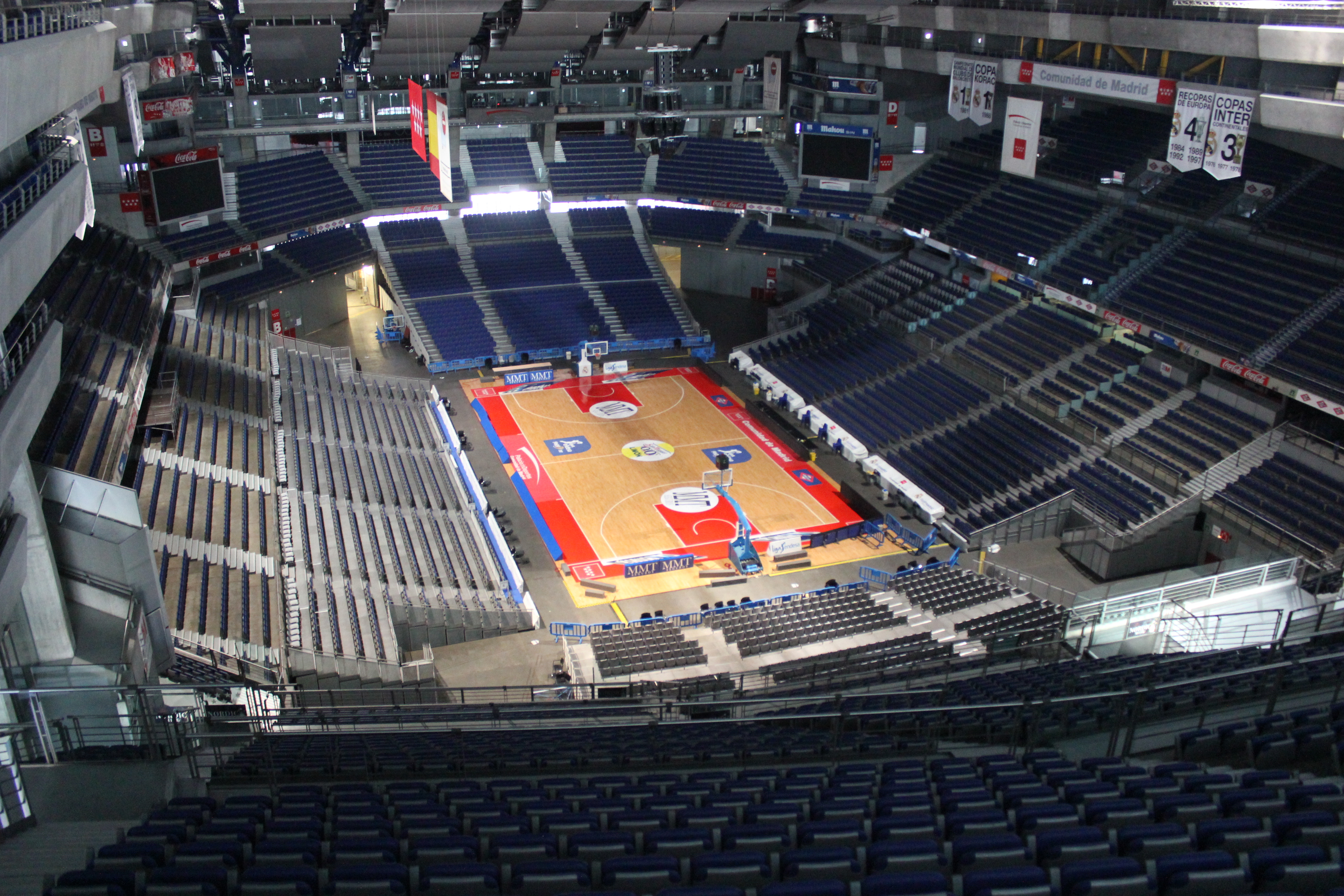
Seating configuration for basketball

After the fire, the Comunidad de Madrid decided to build a new building in the same place. It was designed by architects Enrique Hermoso and Paloma Huidobro. Its construction was started 20 February 2002 with a budget of 124 million euros. He took advantage of the former building of the structure, particularly the facade of the Plaza de Salvador Dalí and Avenida de Felipe II and the back of the Calle Fuente del Berro. It was inaugurated 16 February 2005 by Mayor Alberto Ruiz-Gallardón and the president of the Community of Madrid Esperanza Aguirre.

It has a variable capacity depending on the configuration to be adopted:

- Athletics: 10,000 (with 200m track and six lanes)
- Handball: 14,000
- Basketball: 15,000
- Concerts: 15,500 (with standing public ramp)

== Concerts hosted ==
=== 1960s-90s ===
- 1961: I Jazz World Music Festival
- 1974: Ballet Krasnolarsk
- 1979: Queen
- 1985: Sting
- 1986: Elton John (Ice on Fire Tour)
- 1986: Iron Maiden (Somewhere on Tour)
- 1987: New Order
- 1989: Paul McCartney (The Paul McCartney World Tour)
- 1989: Bon Jovi (New Jersey Syndicate Tour)
- 1990: Phil Collins (Seriously, Live! World Tour)
- 1990: Luciano Pavarotti
- 1991: Gloria Estefan (Into the Light World Tour)
- 1991: Pet Shop Boys (Performance Tour)
- 1991: Bee Gees (High Civilization World Tour)
- 1992: Nirvana
- 1992: 1992 Summer Paralympics
- 1992: Joe Cocker
- 1993: Bon Jovi (Keep the Faith Tour)
- 1993: Whitney Houston (The Bodyguard World Tour)
- 1994: Nirvana
- 1997: Backstreet Boys (Backstreet's Back Tour)
- 1997: Laura Pausini (Laura Pausini in Concerto)
- 1998: Genesis (Calling All Stations Tour)
- 1998: Luis Miguel (Romances Tour)
- 1998: Spice Girls (Spiceworld Tour)
- 1998: Mónica Naranjo (Palabra de mujer Tour)
- 1998: La Oreja de Van Gogh

=== 2000s ===
- 2000: Enrique Iglesias
- 2000: AC/DC (Stiff Upper Lip World Tour)
- 2000: Mónica Naranjo (Minage Tour)
- 2000: Mariah Carey (Rainbow World Tour)
- 2001: Westlife (Where Dreams Come True Tour)
- 2003: Shakira (Tour of the Mongoose)
- 2003: Iron Maiden (Dance of Death World Tour)
- 2004: Anastacia (Live at Last Tour)
- 2005: Queen + Paul Rodgers
- 2005: Oasis (Don't Believe the Truth Tour)
- 2005: Bruce Springsteen (Devils & Dust Tour)
- 2006: The Who (The Who Tour 2006–2007)
- 2006: Muse (Black Holes and Revelations Tour)
- 2006: Pearl Jam (Pearl Jam 2006 World Tour)
- 2006: Depeche Mode (Touring the Angel)
- 2006: La Oreja de Van Gogh (Guapa Seat Tour)
- 2007: Luis Miguel (México En La Piel Tour)
- 2007: David Bisbal
- 2007: Beyoncé (The Beyoncé Experience)
- 2007: Marilyn Manson
- 2007: Bruce Springsteen (Magic Tour)
- 2007: The Who (The Who Tour 2006–2007)
- 2007: 50 Cent
- 2007: Pet Shop Boys (Fundamental Tour)
- 2008: Alicia Keys (Freedom Tour)
- 2008: Backstreet Boys (Unbreakable Tour)
- 2008: Kylie Minogue (KylieX2008)
- 2008: Marea
- 2008: RBD (Gira Del Adiós World Tour)
- 2008: Coldplay (Viva la Vida Tour)
- 2008: Enrique Bunbury
- 2008: Premios Los 40 Principales
- 2008: Mónica Naranjo (Tarántula Tour)
- 2009: The Killers (Day & Age World Tour)
- 2009: AC/DC (Black Ice World Tour)
- 2009: Oasis (Dig Out Your Soul Tour)
- 2009: Il Divo
- 2009: Ricardo Arjona (Quinto Piso Tour)
- 2009: Beyoncé (I Am... World Tour)
- 2009: Jonas Brothers (Jonas Brothers World Tour 2009)
- 2009: Slipknot (All Hope Is Gone World Tour)
- 2009: Metallica (World Magnetic Tour)
- 2009: Laura Pausini (LP World Tour)
- 2009: Green Day (21st Century Breakdown World Tour)
- 2009: Depeche Mode (Tour of the Universe)
- 2009: Katy Perry (Hello Katy Tour)

=== 2010s ===
- 2010: David Bisbal
- 2010: Tokio Hotel
- 2010: MIKA (Imaginarium Tour)
- 2010: Kiss (Sonic Boom Over Europe Tour)
- 2010: Miguel Bosé (Cardio Tour)
- 2010: Peter Gabriel (The New Blood Tour)
- 2010: Shakira (The Sun Comes Out World Tour)
- 2010: Lady Gaga (The Monster Ball Tour)
- 2011: Taylor Swift (Speak Now World Tour)
- 2011: Roger Waters (The Wall Live)
- 2011: Foo Fighters (Wasting Light World Tour)
- 2011: Justin Bieber (My World Tour)
- 2011: Rihanna (Loud Tour)
- 2012: David Bisbal
- 2012: Laura Pausini (Inedito World Tour)
- 2012: Luis Miguel (Luis Miguel Tour)
- 2012: Jennifer Lopez (Dance Again World Tour)
- 2012: Muse (The 2nd Law World Tour)
- 2012: Michael Jackson: The Immortal World Tour
- 2012: Arctic Monkeys (Suck It and See tour)
- 2013: Justin Bieber (Believe Tour)
- 2013: Rammstein (Made in Germany 1995–2011)
- 2013: Malu (Si Tour)
- 2013: Arctic Monkeys (AM Tour)
- 2013: Violetta (Violetta en Vivo)
- 2014: Laura Pausini (The Greatest Hits World Tour)
- 2014: Depeche Mode (Delta Machine Tour)
- 2014: Miley Cyrus (Bangerz Tour)
- 2014: Kylie Minogue (Kiss Me Once Tour)
- 2015: Violetta (Violetta Live)
- 2015: Kiss (The KISS 40th Anniversary World Tour)
- 2015: 5 Seconds of Summer (Rock Out with Your Socks Out Tour)
- 2015: Maroon 5 (Maroon V Tour)
- 2016: The Corrs (White Light Tour)
- 2016: Foals
- 2016: Macklemore & Ryan Lewis
- 2016: Shawn Mendes
- 2016: Laura Pausini (Simili Tour)
- 2016: Muse (Drones World Tour)
- 2016: Iron Maiden (The Book of Souls World Tour)
- 2016: WWE (SmackDown Live House Show / WWE Europe Tour)
- 2016: Meghan Trainor (The Untouchable Tour)
- 2016: Justin Bieber (Purpose World Tour)
- 2017: Bruno Mars (24K Magic World Tour)
- 2017: Sweet California (Ladies' Tour)
- 2017: The 1975 (The 1975 Tour)
- 2017: WWE SmackDown Live House Show / WWE Europe Tour)
- 2017: Helloween (Pumpkins United Tour)
- 2018: Soy Luna (Soy Luna Live)
- 2018: Laura Pausini (Fatti Sentire World Tour)
- 2018: Metallica (WorldWired Tour)
- 2018: Imagine Dragons (Evolve World Tour)
- 2018: Steven Wilson (To The Bone Tour)
- 2018: Luis Miguel (México Por Siempre Tour)
- 2018: Shakira (El Dorado World Tour)
- 2018: Ricardo Arjona (Circo soledad World tour)
- 2018: Camila Cabello (Never Be the Same Tour)
- 2018: U2 (Experience + Innocence Tour)
- 2018: 5 Seconds of Summer (Meet You There Tour)
- 2018: Nightwish ("Decades: World Tour")
- 2018: Mariah Carey (All I Want for Christmas Is You, a Night of Joy and Festivity)
- 2019: Sweet California (Gira Origen)
- 2019: Little Mix (LM5 The Tour)
- 2019: Got7 (2019 World Tour “KEEP SPINNING”)
- 2019: Enrique Iglesias (All the Hits Live))
- 2019: Morat (Balas Perdidas tour)
- 2019: Elton John (Farewell Yellow Brick Road)

=== 2020s ===
- 2020: Halsey (Manic World Tour)
- 2020: Queen + Adam Lambert (The Rhapsody Tour)
- 2020: Melanie Martinez (K-12 Tour)
- 2021: Aitana (11 Razones Tour)
- 2022: Dua Lipa (Future Nostalgia Tour)
- 2022: C. Tangana (Sin cantar ni afinar Tour)
- 2022: Harry Styles (Love On Tour)
- 2022: Tini (Tini Tour 2022-2023)
- 2022: Rosalía (Motomami World Tour)
- 2022: Rigoberta Bandini
- 2022: Nathy Peluso (Calambre Tour)
- 2023: ATEEZ (The Fellowship: Break The Wall)
- 2023: Bad Gyal (La Joia Tour)
- 2023: Lola Índigo (El Dragón Tour)
- 2023: Quevedo
- 2023: Arctic Monkeys (The Car Tour)
- 2023: blink-182 (World Tour 2023/2024)
- 2023: Aitana (Alpha Tour)
- 2024: The 1975 (Still... At Their Very Best)
- 2024: Idles (Love is the Fing Tour)
- 2024: Bad Gyal (La Joia 24 Karats Tour)
- 2024: Niall Horan (The Show: Live on Tour)
- 2024: Paul McCartney (Got Back)
- 2024: Travis Scott (Circus Maximus Tour)
- 2024: Olivia Rodrigo (Guts World Tour)
- 2024: Sum 41 (Tour of the Setting Sum)
- 2024: Arde Bogotá (Gira Cowboys de la A3)
- 2025: Aespa (Synk: Parallel Line)
- 2025: Twenty One Pilots (The Clancy World Tour)
- 2025: Aurora (What Happened to the Earth?)
- 2025: Shawn Mendes (On the Road Again Tour)
- 2025: Katy Perry (The Lifetimes Tour)
- 2025: Radiohead (2025 Radiohead tour)
- 2026: Rosalía (Lux Tour)
- 2026: Bad Gyal (Más Cara World Tour)
- 2026: Tame Impala (Deadbeat Tour)
- 2026: Aitana (Cuarto Azul World Tour)

== Attendance ==
This is a list of home attendance figures of Estudiantes and Real Madrid for league, playoffs and EuroLeague games, the latter only for Real Madrid.

Season	Estudiantes				Real Madrid (ACB)				Real Madrid (EuroLeague)			
Season	Total	High	Low	Average	Total	High	Low	Average	Total	High	Low	Average
2012–13	153,392	12,123	7,231	9,023	187,763	12,832	5,427	8,164	126,365	12,888	6,012	9,026
2013–14	134,752	13,800	2,600	7,927	203,319	13,217	5,814	9,242	155,528	13,192	6,899	10,369
2014–15	133,269	12,500	4,560	7,839	206,930	12,924	6,897	9,406	123,902	12,662	7,806	8,850
2015–16	147,055	13,200	5,860	8,650	197,353	13,149	6,342	8,971	140,015	12,018	9,037	10,770
2016–17	133,696	13,570	3,299	8,356	199,577	12,448	6,783	9,072	175,310	11,998	8,210	10,312
2017–18	138,552	13,513	4,674	8,150	188,844	12,114	4,108	8,584	170,516	12,557	8,067	10,030
2018–19	146,388	12,165	5,219	8,611	166,457	12,749	7,328	9,792	166,187	12,479	7,328	9,776
2019–20 (Note: Season suspended due to the COVID-19 pandemic.)	99,813	13,165	7,312	9,074	135,081	12,729	7,019	9,649	97,027	9,852	6,922	8,086

== See also ==
- List of indoor arenas in Spain
- List of basketball arenas

Events and tenants
Preceded by Sports City Pavilion; Caja Mágica	Home of – Real Madrid; 1987–1999; 2011–present	Succeeded by Raimundo Saporta Pavilion current
Preceded by Pabellón Antonio Magariños; Madrid Arena	Home of – Club Estudiantes; 1987–2001; 2010–present	Succeeded by Palacio Vistalegre current
Preceded by Sportovní hala Prague Peace and Friendship Stadium; Athens Ferry-Dusika-Hallenstadion; Vienna	European Indoor Games; Venue; 1968 1986 2005	Succeeded by Palac Lodowy; Belgrade Stade couvert régional Lievin National Indoor Arena; Birmingham
Preceded by Coliseo El Pueblo; Cali Sinan Erdem Dome; Istanbul	FIBA World Cup; Final venue 1986 2014	Succeeded by Luna Park; Buenos Aires LeSports Center; Beijing
Preceded by Belgrade Arena; Belgrade Xiaomi Arena; Riga	EuroBasket; Final venue 2007 2029	Succeeded by Spodek; Katowice TBD; TBD
Preceded by Olympic Indoor Hall; Athens Mediolanum Forum; Milan	EuroLeague; Final Four venue 2008 2015	Succeeded by O_{2} World; Berlin Mercedes-Benz Arena; Berlin
