= Geneva Arena =

Indoor arena in Geneva, Switzerland

Coordinates: 46.2336°N 6.1122°E

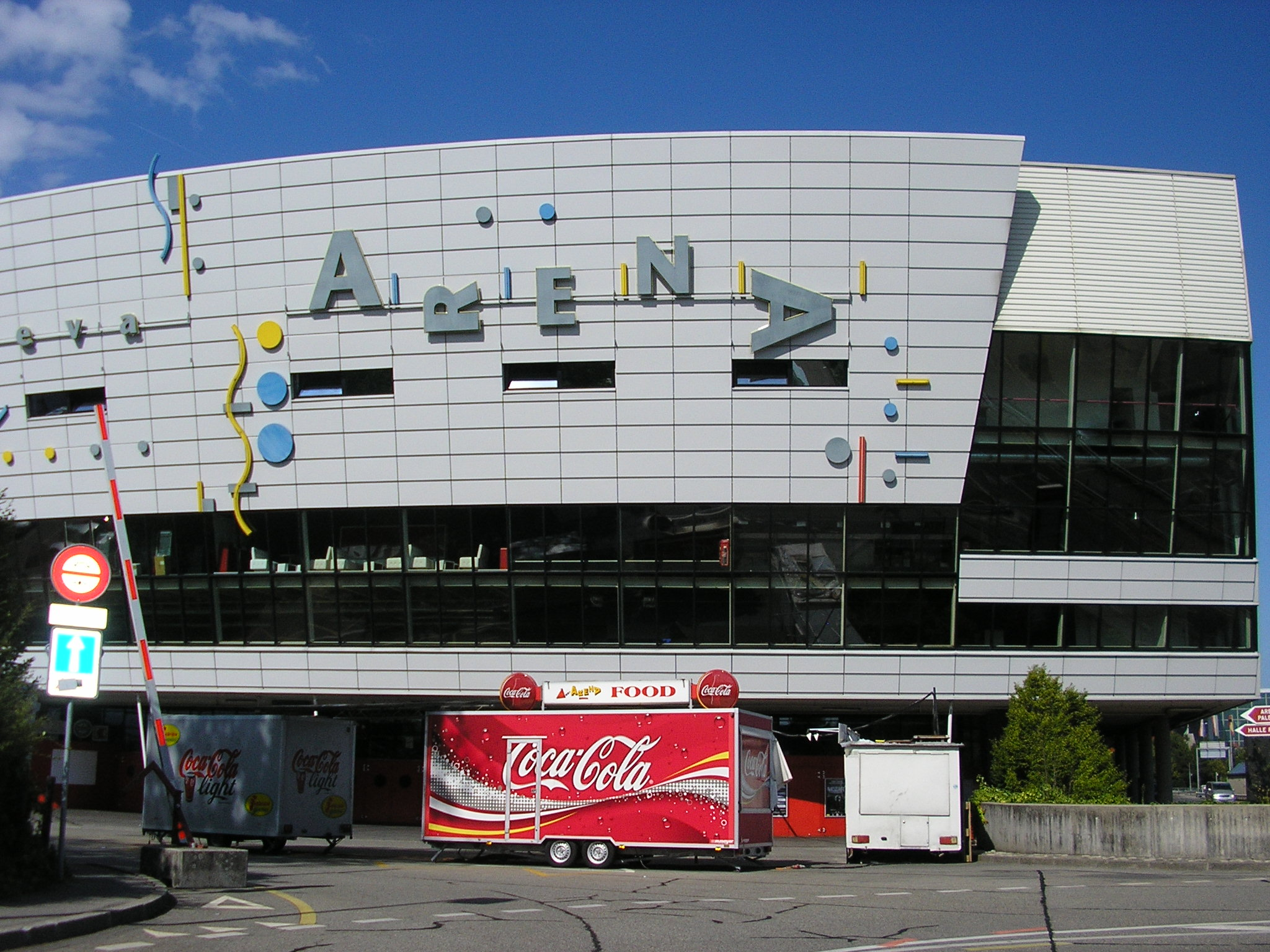
- Interactive map of Geneva Arena
- Address: Route des Batailleux 3; 1218 Geneva, Le Grand-Saconnex; Switzerland
- Location: Palexpo
- Owner: Canton of Geneva
- Capacity: 9,500

Construction
- Opened: 1 November 1995

Website
- Venue Website (French)

SEG Geneva Arena (commonly known as the Geneva Arena, Genf Arena, French: Arena de Genève) is an indoor arena in Geneva, Switzerland. Part of the Palexpo complex, it opened in 1995, and it currently holds 9,500 spectators and hosts concerts and indoor sporting events, such as tennis and basketball.

== Entertainment events ==
Entertainment events at SEA Geneva Arena
Year	Date	Nationalities	Artists	Events
1995	November 14	Canada	Celine Dion	D'eux Tour
1996	February 13	United Kingdom	David Bowie	Outside Tour
1996	May 12	Australia	AC/DC	Ballbreaker World Tour
1996	October 24	United Kingdom	Def Leppard	Slang World Tour
1996	November 1	Canada	Celine Dion	Falling Into You Around the World Tour
1997	March 1	Italy	Laura Pausini	World Wide Tour 1997
1997	July 2	United States	Kiss	Once Wasn't Enough Tour
1997	November 13	United Kingdom	Oasis	Be Here Now Tour
1999	December 9	France	Mylene Farmer	Mylenium Tour
2003	February 3	United States	Tori Amos	On Scarlet's Walk Tour
2003	October 28	United Kingdom	Robbie Williams	2003 Tour
2003	October 29	United Kingdom	Robbie Williams	2003 Tour
2004	July 4	United States	Alanis Morissette	So-Called Chaos Tour
2004	September 22	United States	Slipknot	The Subliminal Verses World Tour
2004	November 26	Ireland	The Corrs	Borrowed Heaven Tour
2005	February 6	United States	Anastacia	Live at Last Tour
2005	February 7	United States	Anastacia	Live at Last Tour
2005	March 20	Italy	Laura Pausini	World Tour '05
2005	May 27	United States	Destiny's Child	Destiny Fulfilled... and Lovin' It
2005	June 9	Canada	Avril Lavigne	Bonez Tour
2005	December 4	United States	Black Eyed Peas	Monkey Business Tour
2006	January 31	United Kingdom	Depeche Mode	Touring the Angel
2006	May 31	United States	Korn	See You on the Other Side World Tour
2006	December 5	United Kingdom	Muse	Black Holes and Revelations Tour
2006	December 17	United States	Pink	I'm Not Dead Tour
2007	April 25	United States	Bob Dylan	Never Ending Tour 2007
2007	May 12	United Kingdom	Deep Purple	Rapture of the Deep tour
2008	February 24	United States	Korn	Bitch We Have a Problem Tour
2008	May 30	Australia	Kylie Minogue	KylieX2008
2008	July 9	Canada	Celine Dion	Taking Chances Tour
2008	October 27	Canada	Leonard Cohen	Leonard Cohen Tour 2008-2010
2009	March 21	United States	Pink	Funhouse Tour
2009	April 20	United States	Bob Dylan	Never Ending Tour 2009
2009	May 10	Italy	Laura Pausini	LP World Tour
2009	June 23	United States	Marilyn Manson	The High End of Low Tour
2009	September 4	France	Mylene Farmer	Mylène Farmer en tournée
2009	September 5	France	Mylene Farmer	Mylène Farmer en tournée
2009	November 19	Germany	Rammstein	Liebe ist für alle da Tour
2009	December 15	United States	Pink	Funhouse Tour
2010	April 27	Barbados	Rihanna	Last Girl on Earth Tour
2010	May 10	United States	Whitney Houston	Nothing but Love World Tour
2010	May 17	United States	Kiss	Sonic Boom Over Europe Tour
2010	September 16	United States	Guns N' Roses	Chinese Democracy Tour
2010	September 16	United States	Murderdolls	Women & Children Last World Tour
2010	September 26	United Kingdom	Sting	Symphonicity Tour
2010	November 29	Colombia	Shakira	The Sun Comes Out World Tour
2011	June 7	Colombia	Shakira	The Sun Comes Out World Tour
2011	October 15	United Kingdom	George Michael	Symphonica Tour
2011	November 4	Germany	Scorpions	Get Your Sting and Blackout World Tour
2011	November 15	United States	Bob Dylan	Never Ending Tour 2011
2012	April 11	Italy	Laura Pausini	Inedito World Tour
2012	May 3	United States	NKOTBSB	NKOTBSB Tour
2013	October 18	France	Mylene Farmer	Timel3ss
2013	October 19	France	Mylene Farmer	Timel3ss
2013	October 28	United States	Bob Dylan	Never Ending Tour 2013
2014	February 5	Italy	Laura Pausini	The Greatest Hits World Tour
2014	March 24	United Kingdom	James Blunt	Moon Landing Tour
2015	March 21	Argentina	Violetta	Violetta Live
2015	March 22	Argentina	Violetta	Violetta Live
2015	June 11	United States	OneRepublic	Native Tour
2015	July 4	United States	Slash	World on Fire World Tour
2015	November 20	United Kingdom	Judas Priest	Redeemer of Souls Tour
2015	December 6	Italy	Tiziano Ferro	Lo stadio Tour 2015
2015	December 8	Germany	Scorpions	Get Your Sting and Blackout World Tour
2016	October 7	The Legend of Zelda: Symphony of the Goddesses		
2016	October 21	Italy	Laura Pausini	Pausini Stadi Tour 2016
2017	May 20	United Kingdom	Deep Purple	The Long Goodbye World Tour
2017	June 14	United States	Bruno Mars	24K Magic World Tour
2017	November 9	United Kingdom	Gorillaz	Humanz Tour
2018	February 15	Argentina	Soy Luna	Soy Luna Live
2018	June 26	United Kingdom	Iron Maiden	Legacy of the Beast World Tour

== See also ==
- List of indoor arenas in Switzerland
