= Simili (album) =

Simili/Similares
- Italian-language edition

Studio album by Laura Pausini
- Released: November 6, 2015 (Italian-language) November 13, 2015 (Spanish-language)
- Genre: Latin pop
- Length: 54:12
- Language: Italian, Spanish
- Label: Warner Music Group

Laura Pausini chronology
20 – The Greatest Hits/20 - Grandes Exitos (2013)	Simili/Similares (2015)	Laura Xmas/Laura Navidad (2016)

Singles from Simili/Similares
- 1. "Lato Destro del Cuore/Lado derecho del corazón" Released: September 25, 2015; 2. "Simili/Similares" Released: November 27, 2015; 3. "Nella porta accanto/En la Puerta de al Lado" Released: February 2, 2016; 4. "Ho creduto a me/He creido en mí" Released: September 2, 2016; 5. "200 note" Released: January 20, 2017; 6. "Preguntale al cielo" Released: January 20, 2017

Simili and Similares (English: Similar) are the twelfth studio albums by Italian singer Laura Pausini. The Italian-language edition was released on November 6, 2015 while the Spanish-language edition was released on November 13, 2015 by Warner Music. The first single was released on September 25, 2015 in two versions; in Italian "Lato Destro del Cuore", and the Spanish version "Lado Derecho del Corazón". The Spanish-language edition received a nomination for a Grammy Award for Best Latin Pop Album.

== Track listings ==
=== Simili ===
No.	Title	Lyrics	Music	Length
1.	"Lato Destro del Cuore"	Biagio Antonacci	Biagio Antonacci	3:52
2.	"Simili"	Laura Pausini, Niccolò Agliardi	Niccolò Agliardi, Edwyn Roberts	3:35
3.	"200 Note"	Tony Maiello	Tony Maiello, Lorenzo Vizzini Bisaccia	3:58
4.	"Innamorata"	Jovanotti	Jovanotti, Riccardo Onori, Christian Rigano	3:20
5.	"Chiedilo al Cielo"	Laura Pausini, Niccolò Agliardi	Paolo Carta	3:15
6.	"Ho Creduto a Me"	Niccolò Agliardi	Massimiliano Pelan	3:14
7.	"Nella Porta Accanto"	Laura Pausini	Mattia De Luca	3:46
8.	"Il Nostro Amore Quotidiano"	Laura Pausini, Niccolò Agliardi	Paolo Carta	3:58
9.	"Tornerò (Con Calma Si Vedrà)"	Biagio Antonacci	Biagio Antonacci	4:07
10.	"Colpevole"	Laura Pausini, Niccolò Agliardi	Laura Pausini, Daniel Vuletic	3:36
11.	"Io C'ero (+ Amore x Favore)"	Laura Pausini	Paolo Carta, L'Aura	2:53
12.	"Sono Solo Nuvole"	Giuliano Sangiorgi	Giuliano Sangiorgi	4:12
13.	"Per la Musica" (feat. Official Fan Club members singers and players)	Laura Pausini, Niccolò Agliardi	Paolo Carta	3:31
14.	"Lo Sapevi Prima Tu"	Laura Pausini, L'Aura	Simone Bertolotti, L'Aura	4:02
15.	"È a Lei Che Devo l'Amore" (feat. Paolo Carta, Paola Carta)	Biagio Antonacci	Biagio Antonacci	2:53

=== Similares ===
All tracks adapted to Spanish by Laura Pausini.

No.	Title	Lyrics	Music	Length
1.	"Lado Derecho del Corazón"	Biagio Antonacci	Biagio Antonacci	3:53
2.	"Similares"	Laura Pausini, Niccolò Agliardi	Niccolò Agliardi, Edwyn Roberts	3:36
3.	"200 Notas"	Tony Maiello	Tony Maiello, Lorenzo Vizzini Bisaccia	3:58
4.	"Enamorada"	Jovanotti	Jovanotti, Riccardo Onori, Christian Rigano	3:21
5.	"Pregúntale al Cielo"	Laura Pausini, Niccolò Agliardi	Paolo Carta	3:16
6.	"He Creído en Mí"	Niccolò Agliardi	Massimiliano Pelan	3:14
7.	"En la Puerta de al Lado"	Laura Pausini	Mattia De Luca	3:47
8.	"Nuestro Amor de Cada Día"	Laura Pausini, Niccolò Agliardi	Paolo Carta	3:59
9.	"Regresaré (Con Calma Se Verá)"	Biagio Antonacci	Biagio Antonacci	4:08
10.	"Culpable"	Laura Pausini, Niccolò Agliardi	Laura Pausini, Daniel Vuletic	3:36
11.	"Yo Estuve (+ Amor x Favor)"	Laura Pausini	Paolo Carta, L'Aura	2:54
12.	"Solo Nubes"	Giuliano Sangiorgi	Giuliano Sangiorgi	4:14
13.	"Es la Música" (feat. Official Fan Club members singers and players)	Laura Pausini, Niccolò Agliardi	Paolo Carta	3:32
14.	"Lo Sabías Antes Tú"	Laura Pausini, L'Aura	Simone Bertolotti, L'Aura	4:03
15.	"A Ella le Debo Mi Amor" (feat. Paolo Carta, Paola Carta)	Biagio Antonacci	Biagio Antonacci	2:54

== Tour ==
Laura Pausini began the world tour in 2016 to promote her new album. The tour started in the Imola Velodrome on 25 May 2016, with this concert serving as a General Rehearsal. Officially the tour started with its premiere at the San Siro Stadium on 4 June 2016. This premiere concert, along with the 5 June 2016 concert also in Milan, were recorded as PAUSINI STADI and released in the Italian TV Station RAI1 on 6 September 2016. Then after 5 mega-concerts in Italy, the tour reached the Americas from July to September letting her visit new countries such as Ecuador, Paraguay, and Uruguay, and visit others such as Puerto Rico and Colombia which she didn't visit in +10 years. Although, the 2 shows scheduled in Colombia at Medellin and Bogotá, were cancelled, she stated that she would return on a further occasion. After reaching the Americas, the tour continued through Europe in October 2016, with concerts scheduled in Spain, France, Luxembourg, UK, Belgium, Germany and Switzerland. But she also had to cancel 5 of these concerts (2 in Spain, 2 in France, and 1 in Luxembourg) because of an acute laryngitis. Because of this, she officially started the European tour in England, UK and ended the tour in Munich, Germany.

== Charts ==
=== Weekly charts ===
Chart (2015)	Peak position
Belgian Albums (Ultratop Flanders)	39
Belgian Albums (Ultratop Wallonia)	7
Dutch Albums (Album Top 100)	33
French Albums (SNEP)	51
German Albums (Offizielle Top 100)	58
Hungarian Albums (MAHASZ)	23
Italian Albums (FIMI)	1
Spanish Albums (PROMUSICAE)	7
Swiss Albums (Schweizer Hitparade)	4
US Top Latin Albums (Billboard)	6
US Latin Pop Albums (Billboard)	3
US World Albums (Billboard)	7

=== Year-end charts ===
Chart (2015)	Position
Belgian Albums (Ultratop Wallonia)	149
Italian Albums (FIMI)	12
Spanish Albums (PROMUSICAE)	96
Chart (2016)	Position
Italian Albums (FIMI)	20
Spanish Albums (PROMUSICAE)	83

== Certifications and sales ==
Region	Certification	Certified units/sales
Brazil (Pro-Música Brasil)	Gold	20,000^{*}
Italy (FIMI)	3× Platinum	150,000^{*}
^{*} Sales figures based on certification alone.
