= Hallenstadion =

Stadium in Zurich, Switzerland

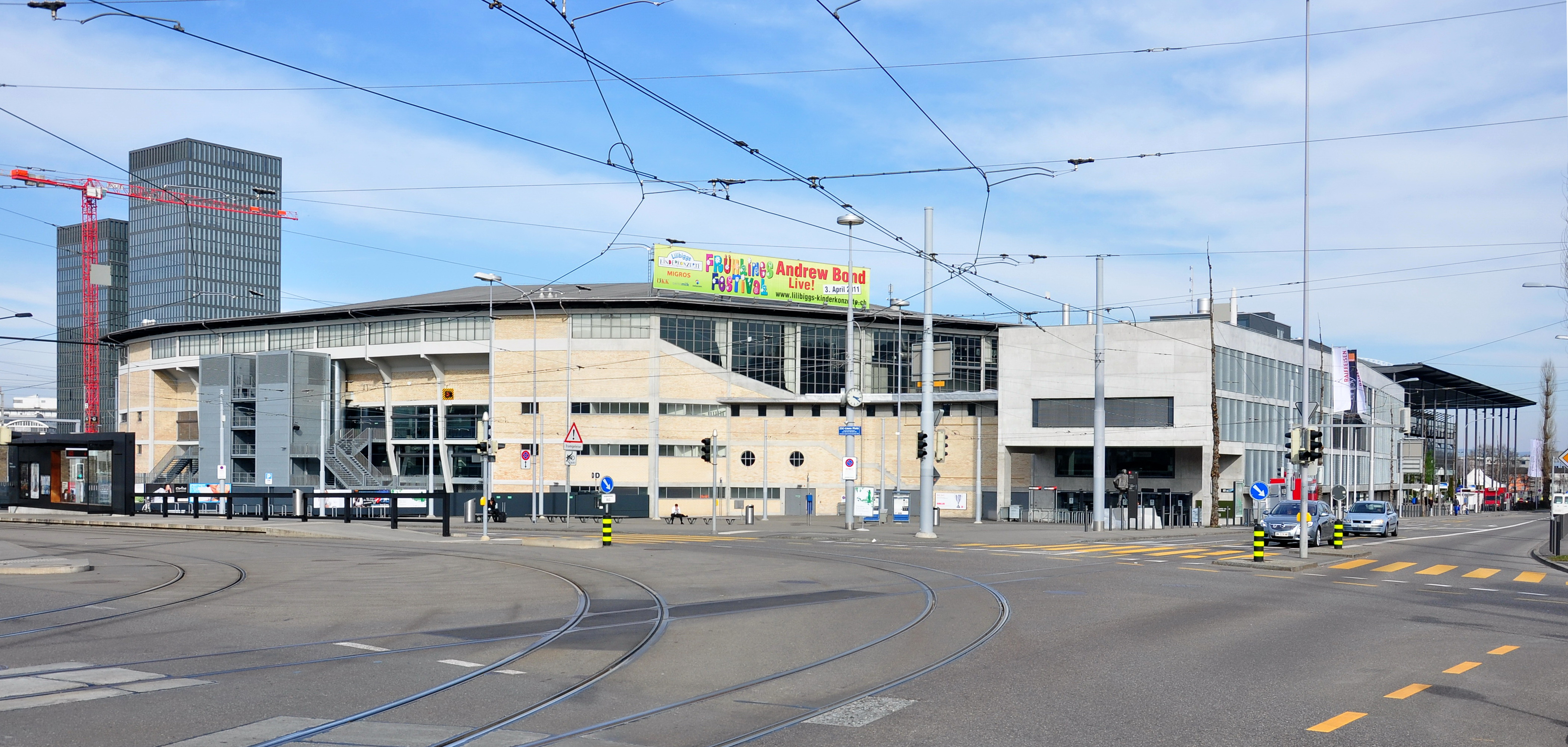
- Exterior of venue (c. 2011)
- Interactive map of Hallenstadion
- Address: Wallisellenstrasse 45; 8050 Zürich; Switzerland
- Location: Oerlikon
- Coordinates: 47°24′41″N 8°33′06″E
- Owner: Stadt Zürich
- Capacity: 11,200 (Ice hockey); 12,000 (Handball); 13,000 (Concerts); 15,000 (max.)

Construction
- Groundbreaking: 2 May 1938
- Opened: 4 November 1939
- Renovated: 2004–05
- Cost: Fr. 3.5 million
- Architects: Karl Egender; Bruno Giacometti
- Structural engineers: R. A. Naef; Ernst Rathgeb

Tenant
- ZSC Lions (NL) (1939–2022)

Website
- www.hallenstadion.ch
- Building details

General information
- Renovated: June 2004—July 2005
- Renovation cost: Fr. 145 million

Renovating team
- Architects: Pfister Schiess Tropeano; Meier + Steinauer
- Civil engineer: Walt + Galmarini
- Other designers: Grünberg & Partner
- Main contractor: Steiner

The Hallenstadion (German: Zürcher Hallenstadion, Zürich Indoor Stadium) is a multi-purpose facility in the Oerlikon quarter of northern Zürich. It has a capacity of 11,200 spectators. Designed by Bruno Giacometti, it opened on November 4, 1939, and was renovated in 2004–05.

The Hallenstadion was home to the ZSC Lions of the Ice Hockey National League (NL) from 1950 to 2022. The Lions moved out of the Hallenstadion at the end of the 2021/22 season to a new 12,000-seat arena a few kilometers away in the Altstetten area. Construction for the new Swiss Life Arena officially began on 6 March 2019 and was completed towards the end of 2022, with the ZSC Lions playing their first game in the new arena on 18 October 2022.

== Events ==
=== Sporting events ===
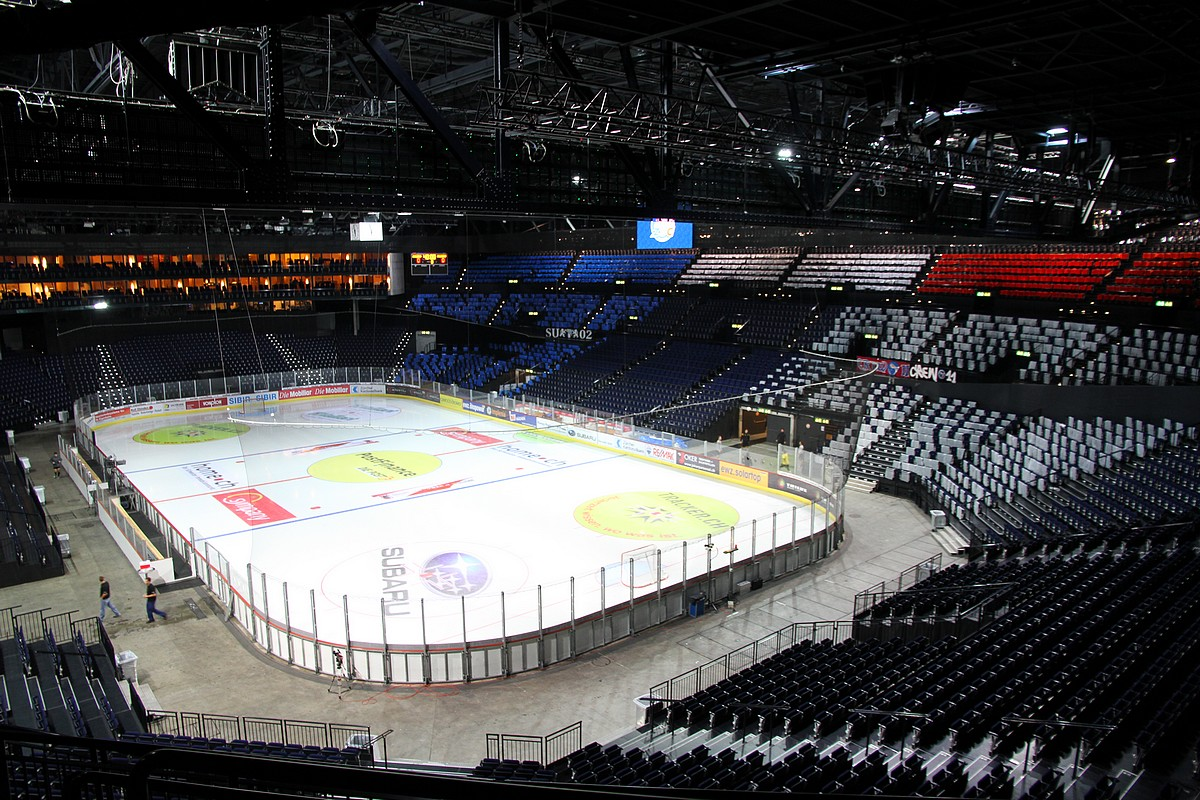
The arena was the home stadium for the ZSC Lions.

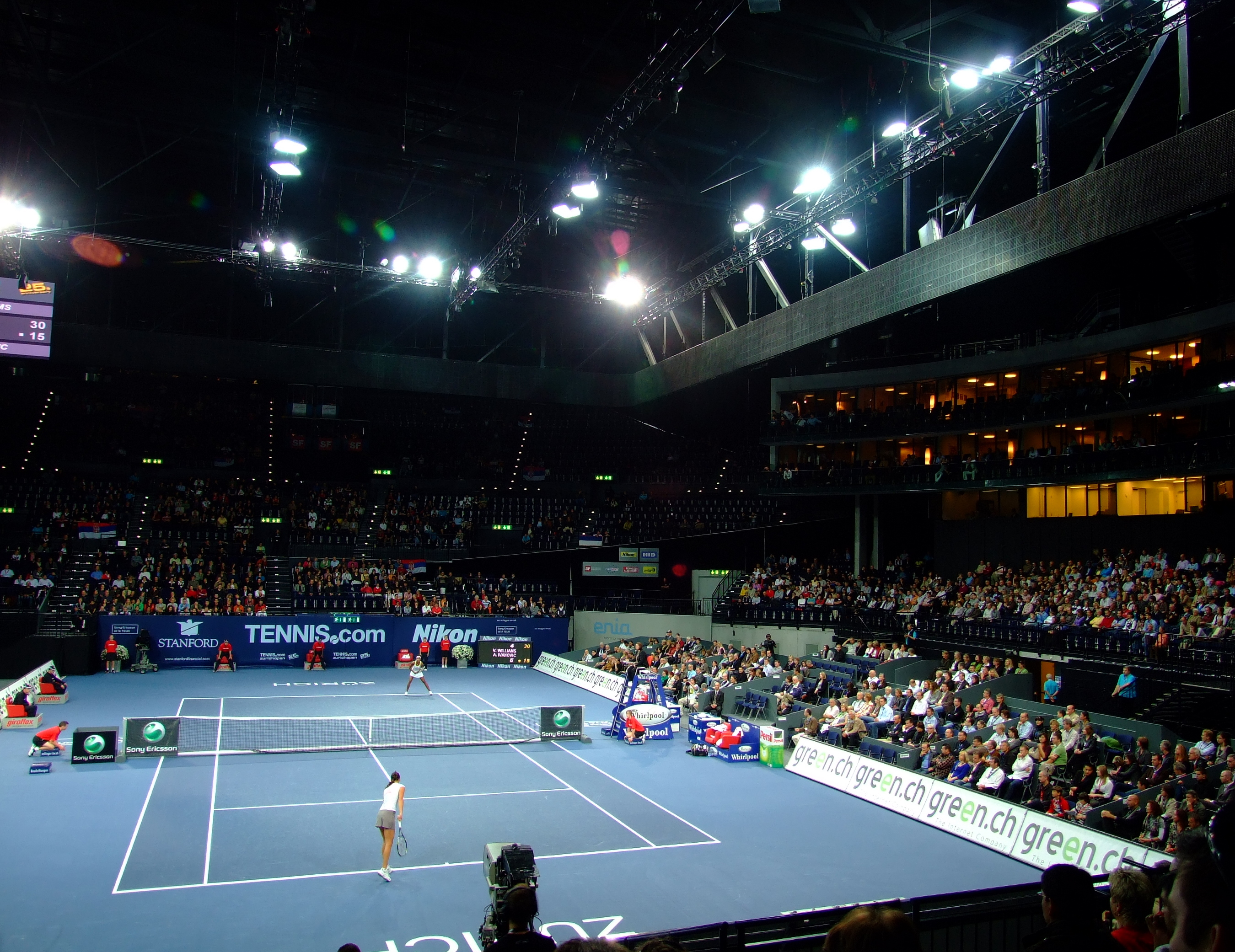
Venus Williams against Ana Ivanovic at the 2008 Zurich Open.

Bicycle race events were held in the Hallenstadion in its first year of service, 1939, and most years since then. The classic Zürcher 6-Tagerennen (Zürich 6-day race) began there in 1954, running on its characteristic oval of wooden boards, until the arena closed temporarily for renovation in 2004. The event is run there again now, in a more modern atmosphere.

The Hallenstadion hosted the Ice Hockey World Championships in 1998, along with Basel, and was the home stadium of the ZSC Lions ice hockey team. In February 2006, it hosted semi-finals and the final of the 2006 European Men's Handball Championship.

It had been the home of the annual Zürich Open, a WTA Tour tennis tournament that was discontinued after 25 years in 2008. On 21 December 2010, tennis returned to the arena with an exhibition featuring Roger Federer against Rafael Nadal, for the benefit of Federer's foundation.

On September 29, 2009, the Hallenstadion hosted the 2009 Victoria Cup. The game pit the NHL's Chicago Blackhawks against the Champions Hockey League title-holder, the Zurich Lions.

In April 2011, the 2011 IIHF Women's World Championship top division were held at the arena and also at the Deutweg Arena in Winterthur.

=== Other events ===
Among many others, in August 2005, the 14th Dalai Lama gave several teachings and initiations as well as a public talk on "The Art of Happiness" open for everyone for 10 days.

The 61st FIFA Congress was held at the Hallenstadion on 31 May and 1 June 2011, and the 65th FIFA Congress was held there on 28 May and 29 May 2015. The 2016 FIFA Extraordinary Congress took place at the venue on 26 February 2016.

Monster Jam made its debut at the venue on 19–21 April 2024.

== Entertainment ==
Hallenstadion has been a top venue for entertainment in Switzerland as many international artists have performed at the venue, spanning a wide range of genres.

Notable entertainment events at Hallenstadion
| Date(s) | Artist(s) | Event/tour |
|---|---|---|
| 14 April 1967 | The Rolling Stones | European Tour 1967 |
| 17 April 1976 | David Bowie | Isolar – 1976 Tour |
| 16 May 1976 | Jethro Tull | Too Old to Rock 'N' Roll Tour |
| 15 June 1976 | The Rolling Stones | The Rolling Stones Tour of Europe '76 |
| 2 July 1977 | Genesis | Wind & Wuthering Tour |
| 28 October 1979 | ABBA | ABBA: The Tour |
| 30 May 1980 | Bob Marley and The Wailers | Uprising Tour |
| 9 June 1980 | Fleetwood Mac | Tusk Tour |
| 30 April 1978 – 2 July 1986 | Queen | News Of The World Tour/Jazz Tour/The Game Tour/Hot Space Tour/The Magic Tour |
| 26–27 May 1984 | Elton John | European Express Tour |
| 8 March 1985 | Tina Turner | Private Dancer Tour |
| 10 March 1985 | Phil Collins | The No Jacket Required World Tour |
| 26–27 March 1986 | Elton John | Ice on Fire Tour |
| 4 May 1986 | Depeche Mode | Black Celebration Tour |
| 15 October 1986 | ZZ Top | Afterburner World Tour |
| 28 March 1987 | Spandau Ballet | Across The Borders Tour |
| 21–24 April 1987 | Tina Turner | Break Every Rule World Tour |
| 12 November 1987 | Depeche Mode | Music for the Masses Tour |
| 10–11 November 1988 | Bon Jovi | New Jersey Syndicate Tour |
| 3, 5–6 May 1989 | Elton John | Reg Strikes Back Tour |
| 19–20 May 1989 | Bee Gees | One for All World Tour |
| 12 October 1990 | Depeche Mode | World Violation Tour |
| 13 October 1990 | Tina Turner | Foreign Affair: The Farewell Tour |
| 15 October 1990 | Janet Jackson | Rhythm Nation World Tour |
| 19 June 1991 | Bee Gees | High Civilization World Tour |
| 14 May 1992 | Cher | Love Hurts Tour |
| 4–5 April 1993 | Bon Jovi | Keep the Faith Tour |
| 21 May 1993 | Depeche Mode | Devotional Tour |
| 2–3 June 1993 | Elton John | The One Tour |
| March 31 1993 | Janet Jackson | janet. World Tour |
| 27–28 May 1995 | Elton John | Made in England Tour |
| 19 November 1995 | Celine Dion | D'eux Tour |
| 21 June 1996 | ZZ Top | Continental Safari Tour |
| 1–2 November 1996 | Tina Turner | Wildest Dreams Tour |
| 3–4 November 1996 | Celine Dion | Falling into You: Around the World |
| 22 May 1998 | Janet Jackson | The Velvet Rope Tour |
| 25 September 1998 | Depeche Mode | The Singles Tour |
| 9 November 1998 | Elton John | Big Picture Tour |
| 3 November 1999 | Cher | Do You Believe? |
| 25 October 2000 | Britney Spears | Oops!... I Did It Again Tour |
| 24 November 2000 | Elton John | Medusa Tour |
| 5 March 2001 | Eric Clapton | Reptile World Tour |
| 4 October 2001 | Depeche Mode | Exciter Tour |
| 29–30 June 2002 | Elton John | Songs from the West Coast Tour |
| 26 October 2002 | ZZ Top | XXX Tour |
| 2 April 2003 | Shakira | Tour of the Mongoose |
| 27 April 2003 | Westlife | Unbreakable Tour |
| 24 October 2003 | David Bowie | A Reality Tour |
| 22 November 2003 | Justin Timberlake | The Justified World Tour |
| 20 May 2004 | Britney Spears | The Onyx Hotel Tour |
| 29 May 2004 | Cher | Living Proof: The Farewell Tour |
| 14 December 2005 | Elton John | Peachtree Road Tour |
| 21–22 February 2007 | Shakira | Oral Fixation Tour |
| 2 June 2007 | Justin Timberlake | FutureSex/LoveShow |
| 18 June 2007 | Barbra Streisand | Streisand: The Tour |
| 12 June 2008 | The Police | The Police Reunion Tour |
| 24 June 2008 | Celine Dion | Taking Chances World Tour |
| 15–16 February 2009 | Tina Turner | Tina!: 50th Anniversary Tour |
| 22 March, 2–3 December 2009 | P!nk | Funhouse Tour |
| 6 April 2009 | AC/DC | Black Ice World Tour |
| 8 May 2009 | Laura Pausini | LP World Tour |
| 6–7 December 2009 | Depeche Mode | Tour of the Universe (tour) |
| 19 April 2010 | Rihanna | Last Girl on Earth |
| 22 June 2010 | Rod Stewart | Soulbook Tour |
| 1 November 2010 | Linkin Park | A Thousand Suns World Tour |
| 14–15 November 2010 | Lady Gaga | The Monster Ball Tour |
| 17 November 2010 | Shakira | The Sun Comes Out World Tour |
| 25 February 2011 | Katy Perry | California Dreams Tour |
| 8 April 2011 | Justin Bieber | My World Tour |
| 7 May 2011 | Duran Duran | All You Need is Now |
| 8 June 2011 | Shakira | The Sun Comes Out World Tour |
| 3 October 2011 | Britney Spears | Femme Fatale Tour |
| 7 November, 10 December 2011 | Rihanna | Loud Tour |
| 13 December 2011 | Red Hot Chili Peppers | I'm with You World Tour |
| 2 March 2012 | International Festival of Country Music, Reba McEntire | |
| 10 April 2012 | Laura Pausini | Inedito World Tour |
| 26–27 September 2012 | Lady Gaga | Born This Way Ball |
| 22 March 2013 | Justin Bieber | Believe Tour |
| 21 May 2013 | P!nk | The Truth About Love Tour |
| 20 June 2013 | Kiss | Monster World Tour |
| 29–30 June 2013 | Rihanna | Diamonds World Tour |
| 6 February 2014 | Laura Pausini | The Greatest Hits World Tour |
| 14–15 February 2014 | Depeche Mode | The Delta Machine Tour |
| 14, 16 April 2014 | Justin Timberlake | The 20/20 Experience World Tour |
| 7 June 2014 | Miley Cyrus | Bangerz Tour |
| 20 June 2014 | Black Sabbath | Black Sabbath Reunion Tour |
| 6 November 2014 | Lady Gaga | ArtRave: The Artpop Ball |
| 3 December 2014 | Elton John | Follow the Yellow Brick Road Tour |
| 28 January 2015 | Ed Sheeran | x Tour |
| 1 March 2015 | Katy Perry | Prismatic World Tour |
| 10 June 2015 | Kiss | Kiss 40th Anniversary World Tour |
| 12 October 2015 | Take That | Take That Live 2015 |
| 12 December 2015 | Madonna | Rebel Heart Tour |
| 28 February 2016 | Ellie Goulding | Delirium World Tour |
| 17–18 May 2016 | Adele | Adele Live 2016 |
| 15 June 2016 | Black Sabbath | The End Tour |
| 5–6 October 2016 | Red Hot Chili Peppers | The Getaway World Tour |
| 20 October 2016 | Laura Pausini | Simili Tour |
| 17 November 2016 | Justin Bieber | Purpose World Tour |
| 8 December 2016 | Elton John | Wonderful Crazy Night Tour |
| 19 March 2017 | Ed Sheeran | Divide Tour |
| 14 May 2017 | Shawn Mendes | Illuminate World Tour |
| 11 February 2018 | Lady Gaga | Joanne World Tour |
| 1 June 2018 | Katy Perry | Witness: The Tour |
| 7 June 2018 | Demi Lovato | Tell Me You Love Me World Tour |
| 22 June 2018 | Shakira | El Dorado World Tour |
| 16 August 2018 | Justin Timberlake | The Man of the Woods Tour |
| 24 October 2018 | Laura Pausini | Fatti Sentire World Tour |
| 27 March 2019 | Nicki Minaj | The Nicki Wrld Tour |
| 31 March 2019 | Shawn Mendes | Shawn Mendes: The Tour |
| 4 July 2019 | Kiss | End of the Road World Tour |
| 9 October 2019 | Cher | Here We Go Again Tour |
| 13 October 2019 | Ariana Grande | Sweetener World Tour |
| 13 February 2020 | Jonas Brothers | Happiness Begins Tour |
| 20 May 2022 | Dua Lipa | Future Nostalgia Tour |
| 30 November 2022 | Burna boy | Love, Damini Tour |
| 26 February 26 2023 | Chris Brown | Under the Influence Tour |
| 3 March 2023 | Lizzo | The Special Tour |
| 25 April 2023 | Roger Waters | This Is Not a Drill |
| 7 June 2023 | SZA | SOS Tour |
| 20 October 2023 | 50 Cent | The Final Lap Tour |
| 23 October 2023 | Louis Tomlinson | Faith in the Future World Tour |
| 28 October 2023 | Luciano Ligabue | Dedicato a noi Tour |
| 13–14 March 2024 | Céline Dion | Courage World Tour (cancelled) |
| 6 April 2024 | Anirudh Ravichander | Hukum World Tour |
| 4 June 2024 | Jonas Brothers | Five Albums. One Night. The World Tour |
| 8 June 2024 | Karol G | Mañana Será Bonito Tour |
| 11 June 2024 | Olivia Rodrigo | Guts World Tour |
| 5 July 2024 | Travis Scott | Circus Maximus Tour |
| 23 January 2025 | Ateez | Towards The Light: Will To Power |
| 24 February 2025 | Gracie Abrams | The Secret of Us Tour |
| 27 March 2025 | Sabrina Carpenter | Short n' Sweet Tour |
| 18 June 2025 | Tate McRae | Miss Possessive Tour |
| 6 July 2025 | Kylie Minogue | Tension Tour |
| 22 March 2026 | Rosalía | Lux Tour |
| 14 April 2026 | Tame Impala | Deadbeat Tour |
| 5 May 2026 | The Neighbourhood | Wourld Tour |
| 9-10 September 2026 | Robbie Williams | Britpop Tour |

== See also ==
- List of cycling tracks and velodromes
- List of European ice hockey arenas
- List of indoor arenas in Switzerland
- List of tennis stadiums by capacity

| Preceded by Tivoli Hall; Ljubljana | European Men's Handball Championship; Final Venue; 2006 | Succeeded by Håkons Hall; Lillehammer |
