= Ascolta il tuo cuore =

Single by Laura Pausini

from the album Le cose che vivi
- Released: February 1997
- Genre: Pop
- Length: 4:40
- Songwriters: Vito Mastrofrancesco, Alberto Mastrofrancesco, Charles Cohiba, Cheope, Fabrizio Pausini
- Producers: Alfredo Cerruti, Dado Parisini

Laura Pausini singles chronology
"Le cose che vivi" (1996)	"Ascolta il tuo cuore" (1997)	"Dos enamorados" (1997)

Music video
- "Ascolta il tuo cuore" on YouTube

"Ascolta il tuo cuore" (in Italian: Listen to your heart) is a song written by Vito Mastrofrancesco, Alberto Mastrofrancesco, Charles Cohiba, Cheope and Fabrizio Pausini. It was recorded by Italian singer Laura Pausini for her 1996's album Le cose che vivi and it was released as the album's third single in February 1997. The song was also featured on Pausini's compilation album The Best of Laura Pausini: E ritorno da te, released in 2001.

A Spanish-language version of the song was also recorded by Pausini for the Hispanic version of the album, Las cosas que vives, and it was released as a single under the title "Escucha a tu corazón".

The music video for the song was directed by Alberto Colombo.

== Live performances ==
A live performance of the song, recorded during Pausini's concert at the Mediolanum Forum in Milan in December 2001, was included in Pausini's first live video album, Live 2001–2002 World Tour.

Pausini also performed "Ascolta il tuo cuore" at the San Siro stadium in Milan on 2 June 2007. This performance was also included in her live album San Siro 2007.

== Charts ==
Chart (1997)	Peak position
US Hot Latin Songs (Billboard)	15
US Latin Pop Airplay (Billboard)	4
