= Se non te =

2013 song recorded by Laura Pausini

Single by Laura Pausini

from the album 20 - The Greatest Hits
- Released: 4 November 2013
- Genre: Pop
- Length: 3:27
- Songwriters: Laura Pausini, Niccolò Agliardi

Laura Pausini singles chronology
| "Limpido" (2013) | "Se non te" (2013) | "Víveme (2014 version)" (2013) |

Se non te (Other than you in English) is a song recorded by Italian singer Laura Pausini and written by Pausini and Niccolò Agliardi.

The song has a Spanish language version, named Sino a ti.

The song was written for Laura Pausini's third compilation album, 20 - The Greatest Hits, released in November 2013. The song was released as the second single extracted from the album, and was released two months after the first one: "Limpido". It is also one of the three new songs that were included in that album, the other ones being "Limpido" (included both as a duet between Pausini and Australian singer Kylie Minogue and a soloist version with only Pausini's vocals) and "Dove resto solo io".

The song was chosen and released as the second single of that album in Italy, Switzerland and Brazil, but not in the rest of Europe.

A music video for the song was recorded in September 2013, and was directed by Gaetano Morbioli. The music video features Marika Lo Cicero, who won a contest thrown by Laura Pausini and got the chance of participating in the shootings This version of the music video shows Pausini's background as a piano-bar singer, with actors taking the roles of her, her father and her mother. Although the song's lyrics talks about Pausini's daughter, Paola, its music video shows the love story of her parents.

== Sino a ti ==
"Sino a ti"

Single by Laura Pausini with Thalía

from the album 20 - Grandes Exitos (2014 edition)
- Released: August 26, 2014
- Recorded: July 2014
- Genre: Pop
- Length: 4:05
- Songwriters: Laura Pausini, Niccolò Agliardi, Jorge Ballesteros

Laura Pausini singles chronology
| ""Donde quedo solo yo" with Alex Ubago" (2014) | "Sino a ti" (2014) | "Lato destro del cuore" (2015) |

Thalía singles chronology
| ""Vamos A Jugar"" (2014) | "Sino a ti" (2014) | "Por Lo Que Reste De Vida" (2014) |

Music video
- "Sino a ti (with Thalia)" on YouTube

The Spanish-language version of Se non te, named Sino a ti was originally included in the CD 20 - Grandes Exitos in November 2013, but not released as a single.

However, on July 22, 2014, Pausini confirmed that she would be one of the four coaches of the fourth season of the Mexican reality show and singing competition La Voz. She also confirmed that by September that same year she would release a special version of her Greatest Hits/Grandes Exitos album to the hispanophone market, in an edition containing three new duets: with Thalía in Sino a ti, Alex Ubago in Donde quedo solo yo and Melendi in Entre tu y mil mares.

The new version of Sino a ti, this time performed as a duet between Laura Pausini and Mexican singer Thalía was released as a single on August 26, 2014. This new version of the song had a music video recorded indoors in the Pier 59 Studios in New York City also in August 2014. This music video was directed by Leandro Manuel Emede and Nicolò Cerioni, and released on September 3, 2014. It shows Pausini and Thalía interacting in a white ambient.

== Tracks ==
Digital download

1. "Se non te"
2. "Sino a ti" - original 2013 soloist version
3. "Sino a ti" - 2014 version, duet with Thalía

== Charts ==
| Chart (2013–14) | Peak position |
|---|---|
| Italy (FIMI) (Italian-language version) | 8 |
| Mexico (Billboard Espanol Airplay) (Spanish-language version, featuring Thalía) | 34 |
| US Latin Pop Digital Songs (Billboard) (Spanish-language version, featuring Thalía) | 18 |
