= Le cose che vivi (song) =

1996 single by Laura Pausini

Single by Laura Pausini

from the album Le cose che vivi
- B-side: Las cosas que vives (Spanish version); Tudo o que eu vivo (Portuguese version)
- Released: September 1996
- Genre: Pop rock
- Length: 4:31
- Songwriters: Cheope, G. Carella, Fabrizio Baldoni and Gino De Stefani
- Producers: Laura Pausini, Alfredo Cerruti and Dado Parisini

Laura Pausini singles chronology
"Incancellabile" (1996)	"Le cose che vivi" (1996)	"Ascolta il tuo cuore" (1997)

"Le cose che vivi" (English: The things that you live through) is a song recorded by Italian singer Laura Pausini for her third Italian-language studio album, Le cose che vivi. The song was released as the album's second single in September 1996. Pausini also recorded a Spanish-language version of the song, titled "Las cosas que vives" and a Portuguese-language version, with the title "Tudo o que eu vivo". The song was also included on Pausini's compilation album The Best of Laura Pausini: E ritorno da te, released in 2001.

In 2013, the song is re-recorded for Pausini's compilation album 20 - The Greatest Hits / 20 - Grandes Éxitos with Brazilian singer Ivete Sangalo, in both Italian-Portuguese and Spanish-Portuguese versions.

== Music video ==
The music video of this song is simple, with shots remembering a movie. During the clip, we see parts of Laura's day. The Spanish-language version of the clip was nominated for Video of the Year at the 9th Lo Nuestro Awards, losing to fellow Italian performer Eros Ramazzotti with "La Aurora".

== Track listing ==
CD single – Italy

1. "Le cose che vivi" – 4:31
2. "Inolvidable" – 3:48

CD single – Mexico – Remix versions

1. "Las cosas que vives" (Tullio Radio Edit) – 3:53
2. "Las cosas que vives" (Dance Mix) – 3:20
3. "Las cosas que vives" (Original Radio Mix One) – 4:00
4. "Las cosas que vives" (Original Radio Mix Two) – 4:01
5. "Las cosas que vives" (Original Mix) – 5:50
6. "Las cosas que vives" (Fabio B Mix) – 4:26

== Charts ==
=== Weekly charts ===
==== Italian version ====
Chart (1997)	Peak position
Belgium (Ultratip Bubbling Under Flanders)	16
Italy Airplay (Music & Media)	7
Netherlands (Single Top 100)	99

==== Spanish version ====
Chart (1996–97)	Peak position
Peru (UNIMPRO)	1
US Hot Latin Songs (Billboard)	6
US Latin Pop Airplay (Billboard)	1

=== Year-end charts ===
==== Spanish version ====
Chart (1997)	Peak position
US Hot Latin Pop Tracks	11

== See also ==
- List of Billboard Latin Pop Airplay number ones of 1996
- List of Billboard Latin Pop Airplay number ones of 1997
