= Incancellabile =

1996 single by Laura Pausini

Single by Laura Pausini

from the album Le cose che vivi
- Released: September 1996
- Genre: Pop
- Length: 3:49
- Label: CGD East West
- Songwriters: Cheope, Marco Marati and Angelo Valsiglio

Laura Pausini singles chronology
"Un amico è così" (1994)	"Incancellabile" (1996)	"Le cose che vivi" (1997)

"Incancellabile" (English: Unforgettable) is a song written by Cheope, Marco Marati and Angelo Valsiglio and recorded by Italian singer Laura Pausini. It was released as the first single from the album Le cose che vivi in 1996. The song was also recorded in Spanish and Portuguese, with the titles "Inolvidable" and "Inesquecível", respectively. The Portuguese version is included only in the Brazilian version of the album.

In 2013, the song is re-recorded with new arrangements for Pausini's compilation album 20 - The Greatest Hits / 20 - Grandes Éxitos.

== Music video ==
Recorded in the end of July 1996 in Iceland (precisely in the Vike zone), atop a volcano crater on the Langisjór region, on the southern part of the island. Shots were taken from the ground and from a helicopter. It was directed by Jamie De La Peña. All the three versions of the song had music videos recorded.

== Track listing ==
CD single – Italy

1. "Incancellabile" – 3:48
2. "Strani amori" – 4:10
3. "Gente" – 4:30
4. "Incancellabile" (Instrumental) – 3:48

Promo CD single – Italy

1. "Incancellabile" – 3:48
2. "Incancellabile" (Instrumental) – 3:48

== Charts ==
=== Weekly charts ===
==== Italian version ====
Chart (1996)	Peak position
Belgium (Ultratop 50 Flanders)	13
Belgium (Ultratop 50 Wallonia)	17
Italy Airplay (Music & Media)	1
Netherlands (Dutch Top 40)	39
Netherlands (Single Top 100)	37
Switzerland (Schweizer Hitparade)	23

==== Spanish version ====
Chart (1996)	Peak position
US Hot Latin Songs (Billboard)	13
US Latin Pop Airplay (Billboard)	3

=== Year-end charts ===
==== Italian version ====
Chart (1996)	Position
Belgium (Ultratop Wallonia)	100

== Frankie Negrón version ==
"Inolvidable"

Single by Frankie Negrón

from the album Con Amor Se Gana
- Released: April 1997
- Genre: Salsa
- Length: 4:35
- Label: WEA Latina
- Songwriters: Cheope, Marco Marati and Angelo Valsiglio
- Producers: Rene Leyva, Pedro Gonzalez

Frankie Negrón singles chronology
"Inolvidable" (1997)	"Hoy Me He Vuelto a Enamorar" (1997)

In 1997, American salsa singer, Frankie Negrón covered "Inolvidable" as his debut single. The song peaked at #20 on the Hot Latin Tracks reach #1 on the Latin Tropical Airplay. It was named the best-performing Latin Tropical Airplay of 1997.

=== Charts ===
Chart (1997)	Peak position
US Hot Latin Songs (Billboard)	20
US Latin Pop Airplay (Billboard)	16
US Tropical Airplay (Billboard)	1

==== Year-end charts ====
Chart (1997)	Peak position
US Tropical Airplay (Billboard)	1

== Sandy & Junior version ==
The Portuguese-language version of the song was covered in 1998 by Brazilian singing duo Sandy & Junior. Laura Pausini and Sandy have sung this version once together.

== See also ==
- List of Billboard Tropical Airplay number ones of 1997
