= Le cose che vivi =

1996 album by Laura Pausini

Le cose che vivi/Las cosas que vives
- Italian-language edition

Studio album by Laura Pausini
- Released: September 12, 1996
- Studios: Santanna Recording Studios, Castelfranco Emilia; Morning Studio, Carimate; Abbey Road Studios, London
- Genre: Pop
- Length: 55:15
- Languages: Italian, Spanish, Portuguese
- Label: CGD East West
- Producers: Alfredo Cerruti, Dado Parisini

Laura Pausini chronology
Laura Pausini (1995)	Le cose che vivi/Las cosas que vives (1996)	La mia risposta/Mi respuesta (1998)

Singles from Le cose che vivi/Las cosas que vives
- 1. "Incancellabile/Inolvidable" Released: September 1996; 2. "Le cose che vivi/Las cosas que vives" Released: December 1996; 3. "Ascolta il tuo cuore/Escucha a tu corazon" Released: February 1997; 4. "Angeli nel blu" Released: April 1997; 5. "Seamisai/Cuando se ama" Released: September 1997; 6. "Dos enamorados" Released: 1998

Le cose che vivi and Las cosas que vives (English: The Things You Live) are the fourth studio albums by Italian singer Laura Pausini, released on September 12, 1996 by CGD East West (Warner) Records. It is Pausini’s first studio album to be released simultaneously in both Italian and Spanish. The Spanish-language edition has sold over 300,000 copies in Spain and its worldwide sales exceed 3 million copies.

In March 1997, the World Wide Tour 1997 began, supporting the album's Italian version. It ended in June 1997.

== Track listing ==
=== Le cose che vivi ===
No.	Title	Lyrics	Music	Length
1.	"Le cose che vivi"	Cheope, Fabrizio Pausini	Giuseppe Carella, Fabrizio Baldoni, Gino de Stefani	4:31
2.	"Ascolta il tuo cuore"	Cheope, F. Pausini	Vito Mastrofrancesco, Alberto Mastrofrancesco, Charles Cohiba	4:41
3.	"Incancellabile"	Cheope	Carella, Baldoni, de Stefani	3:48
4.	"Seamisai"	Cheope	Carella	3:36
5.	"Angeli nel blu"	Cheope, Leonello Meneghetti	Eric Buffat, Leonardo Abbate	5:15
6.	"Mi dispiace"	Giuseppe Dati	Dati, Goffredo Orlandi	6:03
7.	"Due innamorati come noi"	Cheope	Roberto Buti, Roberto Capaccioli	4:30
8.	"Che storia è"	Cheope, F. Pausini	Gabriele Fersini	4:12
9.	"16/5/74"	Cheope	Carella	4:44
10.	"Un giorno senza te"	Cheope	Buti	4:56
11.	"La voce"	Cheope, F. Pausini	Buffat, Telonio	4:54
12.	"Il mondo che vorrei"	Laura Pausini	Buffat, Gianni Salvatori	4:11

Brazilian edition bonus tracks
No.	Title	Lyrics	Music	Portuguese adaptation	Length
13.	"Tudo o que eu vivo"	Cheope, F. Pausini	Carella, Baldoni, de Stefani	Cláudio Rabello	4:31
14.	"Inesquecível"	Cheope	Carella, Baldoni, de Stefani	Rabello	3:48
15.	"Apaixonados como nós"	Cheope	Buti, Capaccioli	Rabello	4:30

=== Las cosas que vives ===
No.	Title	Lyrics	Music	Spanish adaptation	Length
1.	"Las cosas que vives"	Cheope, F. Pausini	Carella, Baldoni, de Stefani	Badia	4:31
2.	"Escucha a tu corazón"	Cheope, F. Pausini	V. Mastrofrancesco, A. Mastrofrancesco, Cohiba	Badia	4:41
3.	"Inolvidable"	Cheope	Carella, Baldoni, de Stefani	Badia	3:48
4.	"Cuando se ama"	Cheope	Carella	Badia	3:36
5.	"Ángeles en el cielo"	Cheope, Meneghetti	Buffat, Abbate	Badia	5:15
6.	"Lo siento"	Dati	Dati, Orlandi	Badia	6:03
7.	"Dos enamorados"	Cheope	Buti, Capaccioli	Badia	4:30
8.	"¿Qué historia es?"	Cheope, F. Pausini	Fersini	Badia	4:12
9.	"16/5/74"	Cheope	Carella	Badia	4:44
10.	"Un día sin ti"	Cheope	Buti	Badia	4:56
11.	"La voz"	Cheope, F. Pausini	Buffat, Telonio	Badia	4:54
12.	"El mundo que soñé"	Laura Pausini	Buffat, Salvatori	Badia	4:11

== Charts ==
=== Weekly charts ===
Chart (1996–97)	Peak Position
Belgian Albums (Ultratop Flanders)	4
Belgian Albums (Ultratop Wallonia)	3
Dutch Albums (Album Top 100)	6
Danish Albums (IFPI)	20
European Top 100 Albums (Billboard)	9
French Albums (SNEP)	15
Italian Albums (FIMI)	2
Norwegian Albums (VG-lista)	12
Portuguese Albums (AFP)	1
Spanish Albums (AFYVE)	2
Swedish Albums (Sverigetopplistan)	2
Swiss Albums (Schweizer Hitparade)	1
US Top Latin Albums (Billboard)	15
US Latin Pop Albums (Billboard)	9

=== Year-end charts ===
Chart (1996)	Position
Spanish Albums (AFYVE)	19
Swiss Albums (Schweizer Hitparade)	34
Chart (1997)	Position
Spanish Albums (AFYVE)	44
US Latin Pop Albums (Billboard)	15
US Top Latin Albums (Billboard)	40

== Certifications and sales ==
Region	Certification	Certified units/sales
Argentina (CAPIF)	Platinum	60,000^{^}
Belgium (BRMA)	Gold	25,000^{*}
Brazil (Pro-Música Brasil)	Platinum	250,000^{*}
Chile	2× Platinum	
Colombia	Gold	
Italy (FIMI)	3× Platinum	344,000
Mexico (AMPROFON)	Gold	100,000^{^}
Netherlands (NVPI)	Gold	50,000^{^}
Spain (Promusicae)	4× Platinum	400,000^{^}
Sweden (GLF)	Gold	50,000^{^}
Switzerland (IFPI Switzerland)	Platinum	50,000^{^}
Summaries
Europe (IFPI)	Platinum	1,000,000^{*}
Worldwide	—	3,000,000
^{*} Sales figures based on certification alone.^{^} Shipments figures based on certification alone.
