= Limpido =

2013 single by Laura Pausini and Kylie Minogue

Single by Laura Pausini and Kylie Minogue

from the album 20 - The Greatest Hits
- Released: 10 September 2013
- Genre: Pop
- Length: 3:27
- Label: Atlantic
- Songwriters: Laura Pausini; Virginio Simonelli

Laura Pausini singles chronology
"Celeste" (2012)	"Limpido" (2013)	"Se non te" (2013)

Kylie Minogue singles chronology
"Flower" (2012)	"Limpido" (2013)	"Into the Blue" (2014)

Music videos
- "Limpido" on YouTube; "Limpio" (Spanglish version) on YouTube; "Limpio" (Spanish version) on YouTube

"Limpido" (English: "Clear", "Clean") is a song recorded by Italian singer Laura Pausini and Australian singer Kylie Minogue. Written by Pausini and Virginio Simonelli, it was released on 10 September 2013 as the lead single from Pausini's greatest-hits album 20 – The Greatest Hits. It has received a nomination for World's Best Song and best music video at the 2013 World Music Awards. The single peaked at number one on the Italian Top Digital Downloads chart, and it was certified gold by the Federation of the Italian Music Industry.

This duet was recorded and released in three versions: Italian-English, Spanish-English, and Spanish (titled "Limpio"). Also, Pausini has released solo versions of the song, In Italian, Spanish, and English. The English version is titled "Radiant". "Limpio" marks the second time Minogue recorded and released a song in Spanish, the first one being 2010's "Los Amores".

== Lyrics ==
The song's lyrics bring within them a very optimistic message. The first sentence of the song: "Forse noi non siamo fatti per cambiare, forse noi non cambieremo mai", in English: "Maybe we weren't made for changing, and maybe we will never change any more", represents a change in Pausini's writing, showing her public that she has grown as a woman and a singer while always faithful to herself.

"Letting go, no more fighting, time will show you what you mean to me. Letting go, free my instincts. From the darkness I will re-emerge limpido, limpido…"

== Release ==
The single was released on digital formats, and it's included on 20 - The Greatest Hits & 20 - Grandes Éxitos. It was announced at the site Amazon.com on 9 September 2013, with a release date scheduled to the day after. Lyric videos for all versions of the song were posted on Pausini's official YouTube channel on 9 September 2013.

== Music video ==
The music video was filmed in September 2013 in Rome, Italy and was officially released on 6 October 2013. The video starts with Pausini wearing a bejeweled veil and long eyelashes. She lifts the veil and the song intercuts with scenes of Pausini in a white suit singing and playing guitar, Minogue in a black lace dress, Pausini submerged in water save for her face, Minogue and Pausini submerged in glitter covered water save for their faces, and an African dancer wearing rope braids dancing on a sandy surface. The video ends with a shot of Minogue and Pausini together in the water.

== Track listing ==
- Digital download
1. "Limpido" (Italian-English version) (with Kylie Minogue)
2. "Limpido" (solo Italian version)
3. "Limpio" (Spanish version) (with Kylie Minogue)
- Maxi Version-LP (limited edition) [cd-maxi]
1. "Limpio" (Spanglish version) (with Kylie Minogue)
2. "Limpio" (solo Spanish version)

== Charts ==
Weekly chart performance for "Limpido"
Chart (2013)	Peak position
Belgium (Ultratip Bubbling Under Wallonia)	18
Italy (FIMI)	1
Mexico (Billboard Espanol Airplay)	20
Spanish Airplay (PROMUSICAE)	22
Switzerland (Schweizer Hitparade)	66

=== Year-end charts ===
Annual chart rankings for "Limpido"
Chart (2013)	Position
Italy (FIMI)	88

=== Certifications ===
Sales and certifications for "Limpido"
Region	Certification	Certified units/sales
Italy (FIMI)	Gold	15,000^{*}
^{*} Sales figures based on certification alone.

== Release history ==
Country	Date	Format	Label
Worldwide	September 10, 2013	Digital download	Warner Music
Italy	September 10, 2013	Contemporary hit radio	Warner Music
