= Andrew Maury =

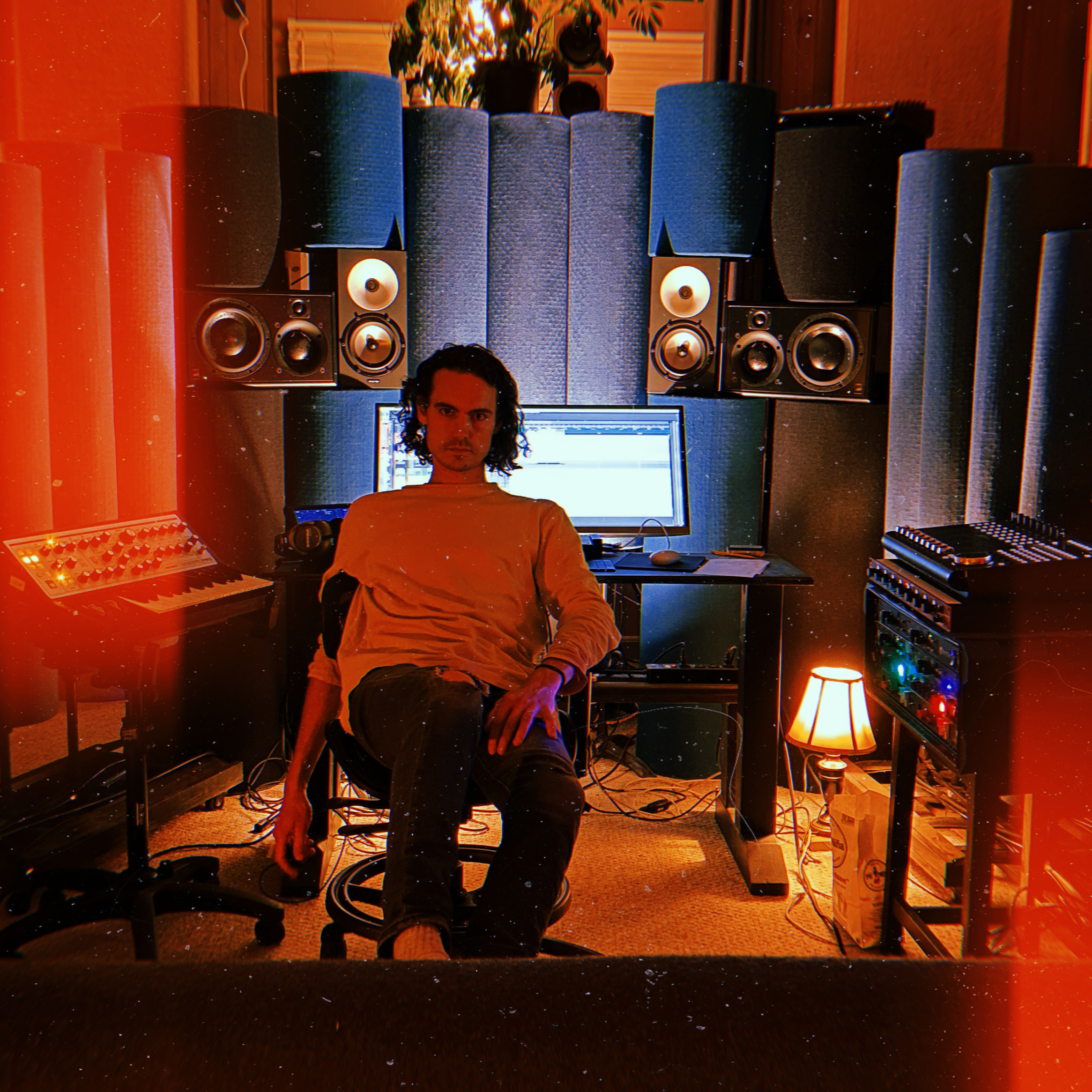
- Maury in 2021

Background information
- Occupations: Mixer, record producer
- Website: www.andrewmaury.net

Andrew Maury is an American mixing engineer and record producer based in Brooklyn, New York.

== Career ==
Maury has worked with artists such as Lewis Del Mar, Shawn Mendes, Lizzo, Madi Diaz, Hudson Freeman, Jade Street, Victoria Canal, Petey USA, Vagabon, Post Malone, Colony House, RAC, Jeremy Zucker, Kimbra, COIN, The Kooks, Ra Ra Riot, Delicate Steve, Atlas Genius, Flor, Isaac Dunbar, and CRUISR. Andrew started his career in 2008 touring with Ra Ra Riot mixing front-of-house while producing / mixing artists between tours. In the summer of 2009, he assisted on Tegan and Sara's Sainthood produced by Death Cab for Cutie guitarist Chris Walla at the world-famous Sound City Studios in Los Angeles. Since 2013, Maury stopped touring and has focused on producing and mixing records.

== Selected discography credits ==
Year	Album/Song	Artist	Credit
2026	"Dalmatian"	Dhruv	M
2026	"Fine"	Ben Kidson	M
2026	"Snake The Drain"	Devon Again	M
2026	Eyes Repeating	Dazies	M
2026	EP1	Friday Pilots Club	M
2026	"Spider," "Iguana," "1981 Saturn"	Jade Street	M
2026	The News EP	Jade Street	P, M
2026	Infinity Song	Infinity Song	M
2026	Songs For Young Lovers	Johnny Orlando	M
2026	How Real Was It?	Asha Banks	M
2026	"Simple," "Second Guesser"	Sung Holly	M
2026	into the undergrowth	Annika Wells	M
2026	Cosmic Wink	Juliet Ivy	M
2025	"The Crowd," What I Am"	Johnny Orlando	M
2025	Don't Cry Because Its Over	Will Linley	M
2025	"The Farm"	HAIM	M
2025	Enema Of The Garden State	Madi Diaz	E, M
2025	I Can See The Future	Leith Ross	M
2025	Is A Folk Artist	Hudson Freeman	M (2), MA
2025	All Night Days	Rob Thomas	M
2025	The Yips	Petey USA	M
2025	Fine!	Colby!	M
2025	"Where He Goes"	Uhl	CP, E, M
2024	Slowly, It Dawns	Victoria Canal	M
2024	Lover Tofu Fruit	Tiffany Day	M (3 tracks)
2024	"Cherry Cola"	Devon Again	M
2024	Kind Hands	Goodwill	M
2024	"Hate Your Guts"	Inji	M
2024	"Dreaming"	Tones And I	M
2024	Bad As I Wanna Be	Skizzy Mars	M
2024	Disintigration	Daniel Noah Miller	M
2024	Whispering Pines	Zach Hood	M
2023	Weird Faith	Madi Diaz	M
2023	EAT DIRT	Annika Wells	M
2023	Magic	Will Linley	M
2023	"Findaway"	Arlie	M
2023	The Cannonballers	Colony House	M
2023	I Sleep Fine Now	Gatlin	M
2023	Sorry I Haven't Called	Vagabon	M
2023	Mirror	Lauren Spencer-Smith	M
2022	"W.I.T.C.H."	Devon Cole	M
2022	Saboteur	Ruby Red	M
2022	"When You're Gone"	Shawn Mendes	M
2022	Shaking Hands With Elvis	August Ponthier	M
2021	Rainbow Mixtape	COIN	M
2021	History Of A Feeling	Madi Diaz	M
2021	Dangerous Levels Of Introspective	JP Saxe	M
2021	Grizfolk	Grizfolk	M
2020	August	Lewis Del Mar	P, E, M
2020	Everlasting	Loyal Lobos	M
2020	"Crowd"	Sophie Cates	M
2020	"always"	Keshi	M
2020	"Makeup Drawer"	Isaac Dunbar	M
2019	"What A Shame"	Leyla Blue	M
2019	Table Of Context	Cautious Clay	MA
2019	Ley Lines	Flor	M
2019	"Jerome"	Lizzo	M
2019	"Drunk On A Rhythm"	Gothic Tropic	M
2019	Till I Burn Up	Delicate Steve	M
2018	Shawn Mendes	Shawn Mendes	M
2018	"Ooh Lordy"	Youngr	M
2017	come out you're hiding	Flor	M
2017	glisten	Jeremy Zucker	M
2017	idle	Jeremy Zucker	M
2017	"There's Nothing Holdin' Me Back"	Shawn Mendes	P, M
2017	How Will You Know If You Never Try	COIN	P, M
2016	"Broken Whiskey Glass", "Leave"	Post Malone	M
2016	Lewis Del Mar	Lewis Del Mar	P, E, M
2016	"Sweet Relief"	Kimbra	P, M
2015	Cascades	High Highs	P, E, M
2016	EP	Lewis Del Mar	P, E, M
2015	Into Focus EP	Panama Wedding	P, E, M
2015	Inanimate Objects	Atlas Genius	M (9 tracks)
2015	Use Your Time Wisely	Strange Names	P, E, M
2015	Lost In New York	Penguin Prison	M (9 Tracks)
2015	Rest In Paradise	Kisses	P, M
2015	"Go For It" Single	CRUISR	P, E, M
2015	Live In Las Vegas	Delicate Steve	M
2015	Karl Kling	Karl Kling	M
2015	COIN	COIN	M (4 tracks)
2014	Sadie	Astronauts, etc.	M
2014	All Over	CRUISR	P, E, M
2014	Parallel Play	Panama Wedding	P, E, M
2014	Strangers	RAC	M
2014	"Pretend Believe" single	HOLYCHILD	M
2014	Shatter Me	Lindsey Stirling	M (2 tracks)
2013	Violent Light	Milagres	M
2013	In Blue	The Static Jacks	P, E, M
2012	Kids in L.A.	Kisses	M
2012	Remembrance of things to Come	Princeton	E, M
2011	"Some Boys (RAC Maury Mix)"	Death Cab for Cutie	Remix
2011	Massachusetts 2010	Mathieu Santos	P, E, M
2010	The Orchard	Ra Ra Riot	P, E
2010	The Heart of the Nightlife	Kisses	P, M
2010	Warship	The House Floor	E, M
2010	Sainthood	Tegan and Sara	Logic Operator
2009	Laces	The Static Jacks	P, E, M

== RAC ==
From 2008 to 2013, Maury was a contributing member of RAC and produced remixes for dozens of artists such as Surfer Blood, The Static Jacks, Death Cab for Cutie, Lenka, Clubfeet, Lacrymosa, Jukebox the Ghost, Tokyo Police Club, and Phoenix.
