= Fatal Optimist =

Studio album by Madi Diaz
- Released: October 10, 2025
- Studio: Infinite Family
- Length: 39:17
- Label: Anti-
- Producers: Madi Diaz; Gabe Wax

Madi Diaz chronology
Weird Faith (2024)	Fatal Optimist (2025)

Singles from Fatal Optimist
- 1. "Feel Something" Released: July 21, 2025; 2. "Ambivalence" Released: August 18, 2025; 3. "Heavy Metal" Released: September 15, 2025; 4. "Why'd You Have to Bring Me Flowers" Released: October 6, 2025

Fatal Optimist is the seventh studio album by the American singer-songwriter Madi Diaz. The album was released on October 10, 2025, by Anti-.

== Background and production ==
In 2021, Diaz released History of a Feeling, her fifth studio album, about her breakup with the American singer-songwriter Teddy Geiger. In 2023, Diaz toured with Harry Styles and began working on her next album, Weird Faith (2024), which dealt with placing trust in herself, the growth of her career, and her relationships with her new manager, new label, and new romantic partner.

During her tour with Styles, Diaz separated from her partner and began to suffer from constant hip pain. She then began working on Fatal Optimist in 2023 during a songwriting retreat on Nantucket. She recorded at a studio in New Jersey and produced the album with Gabe Wax at Infinite Family Studio in Southern California.

== Release and promotion ==
Diaz announced Fatal Optimist and released its lead single "Feel Something" on July 21, 2025. She also released "Ambivalence", "Heavy Metal", and "Why'd You Have to Bring Me Flowers" as singles. The album was released on October 10, 2025; Diaz supported it with a tour. A deluxe edition of the album, titled Fatal Optimist (UN-unplugged), was released by Anti- on September 4, 2026, featuring Diaz's version of "This Is How a Woman Leaves", a song she co-wrote with Sarah Buxton and Maren Morris, as well as versions of "Heavy Metal" with Lucy Dacus and "Why'd You Have to Bring Me Flowers" with August Ponthier.

== Critical reception ==
Professional ratings
Aggregate scores
Source	Rating
Metacritic	80/100
Review scores
Source	Rating
AllMusic	4/5 stars
Clash	8/10
Mojo	3/5 stars
PopMatters	7/10
Rolling Stone	3.5/5 stars
Spill Magazine	3.5/5 stars
Uncut	9/10

Maura Johnston awarded the album 3.5 out of 5 stars for Rolling Stone and praised Diaz's vocals, lyrics, and the album's arrangement. Sophie Montague also rated the album 3.5 out of 5 stars in Spill Magazine, writing that the album had a "charming simplicity" and showed Diaz's "strength in sadness". For Uncut, Nigel Williamson rated the album 9 out of 10. Williamson wrote that Diaz's lyrics "reveal[ed] fresh and unexpected insights" about breakups and called the album "raw but gorgeously melodic". For No Depression, John Amen wrote that the album, "stripped to essentials – acoustic guitar and vocal – ... spotlights Diaz".

== Track listing ==
Fatal Optimist track listing
No.	Title	Writer(s)	Length
1.	"Hope Less"	Madi Diaz; Savana Santos; Konrad Snyder	3:25
2.	"Ambivalence"	Diaz; Morgan Nagler	4:32
3.	"Feel Something"	Diaz; Todd Clark; Donovan Woods	3:20
4.	"Good Liar"	Diaz; Tenille Townes; Stephen Wrabel	3:44
5.	"Lone Wolf"	Diaz; Stephen Wilson Jr.	3:10
6.	"Heavy Metal"	Diaz; Steph Jones	3:55
7.	"If Time Does What It's Supposed To"	Diaz; Aaron Ratiere	3:09
8.	"Flirting"	Diaz; Santos	3:18
9.	"Why'd You Have to Bring Me Flowers"	Diaz	4:04
10.	"Time Difference"	Diaz; Jamie Floyd	3:30
11.	"Fatal Optimist"	Diaz; Santos; Snyder	3:05
Total length:			39:17

== Personnel ==
Credits adapted from Tidal and Bandcamp.

- Madi Diaz – production, vocals, guitar (all except track 8), piano (track 8)
- Gabe Wax – production, mixing, baritone guitar (track 1), shaker (track 5)
- Jake Weinberg – additional production (tracks 1 and 3), bass (tracks 2, 5, and 6), percussion (track 3), piano (tracks 8 and 11), synthesizer (track 11)
- Ruiari O'Flaherty – mastering
- Waylon Rector – guitar (tracks 2, 5, and 6)
- Dylan Day – guitar (tracks 3, 7, and 9)
- Hudson Pollack – guitar (tracks 4 and 11)
- Savana Santos – background vocals (track 11)
- Sam KS – drum kit (track 11)
