= Grey coat =

Grey coat, Greycoat, Graycoat, or Grey Coat may refer to:

- Grey (coat colour) of horses
- Grey Coat School, York, girls' school in York
- Grey Coat Hospital, girls' school in Westminster, London
- Greycoats (band), indie rock group from Minneapolis, Minnesota
- Confederate States Army soldier, nickname based on:
  - Military uniforms of the Confederate States, mostly having gray coats

== See also ==
- "Graycoat Soldiers" track on The Fields of November, 1974 album by Norman Blake
