= I'm Not Afraid (disambiguation) =

I'm Not Afraid or variations on that phrase may refer to:

- I'm Not Afraid, a 2017 album by John Mark Nelson
- "I'm Not Afraid" (Black song), a song from the 1987 album Wonderful Life
- "I'm Not Afraid", a song by Remy Zero from the 2001 album The Golden Hum
- "I'm Not Afraid", a song by Masterplan from the 2005 album Aeronautics
- "I'm Not Afraid", a song by Lacuna Coil from the 2009 album Shallow Life
- "Not Afraid", a song by Eminem from the 2010 album Recovery
- "No Tengo Miedo", a 2026 Mexican TV series, known as "I'm Not Afraid" in English.
