= In Blue (disambiguation) =

In Blue is a 2000 album by The Corrs.

In Blue may also refer to:

- In Blue Tour, a tour by The Corrs
- In Blue (Klaus Schulze album), 1995
- In Blue (The Static Jacks album), 2013
- In Blue (film), a 2017 Dutch drama film
- In Blue (Akira Kagimoto), a 2009 documentary video
