= Nation of Language =

American indie pop band

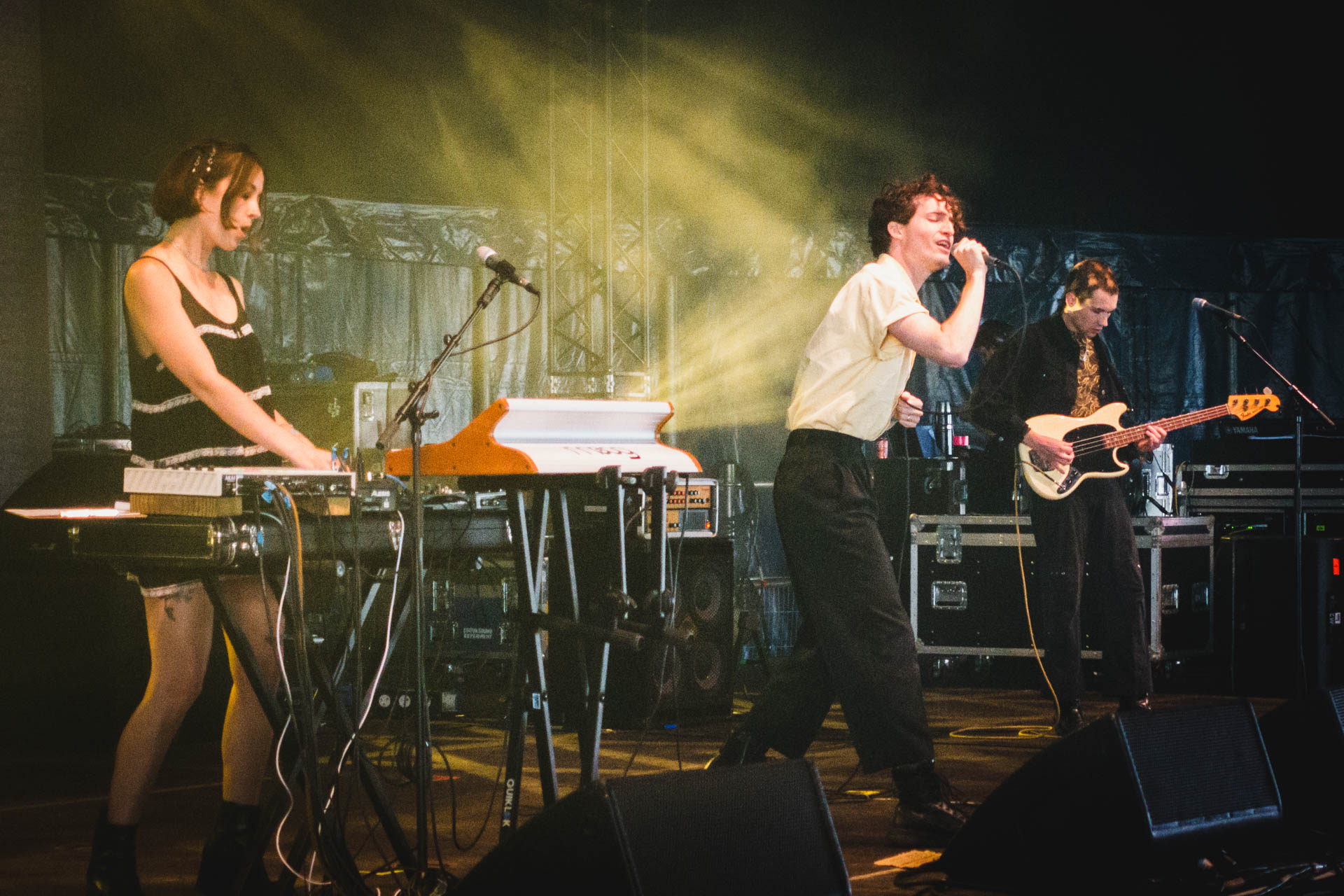
- Nation of Language performing in May 2022

Background information
- Origin: Brooklyn, New York City, U.S.
- Genres: Indie pop, synthpop, post-punk
- Years active: 2016–present
- Labels: PIAS, Sub Pop
- Members: Ian Richard Devaney; Aidan Noell; Alex MacKay
- Past members: Michael Sue-Poi
- Website: nationoflanguage.com

Nation of Language is an American indie pop band that formed in Brooklyn, New York, in 2016. The group consists of Ian Richard Devaney (lead vocals, guitar, synthesizer, percussion), Aidan Noell (synthesizer, backing vocals), and Alex MacKay (bass guitar). Michael Sue-Poi was the bassist prior to the band's 2022 tour.

== History ==
Devaney and Sue-Poi were both members of the Static Jacks, but the band became inactive after the release of their second album. Devaney was inspired to start a new project after hearing "Electricity" by OMD in his father's car, a track he listened to in his childhood. What started out as Devaney "fooling around" on a keyboard later evolved into Nation of Language, with the addition of Devaney's partner Noell and former Static Jacks bandmate Sue-Poi. Current bassist Alex MacKay joined the band in 2022.

The band released a number of singles from 2016 through to 2019, before releasing their debut album Introduction, Presence in May 2020. The album, which Billboard has since described as "an irresistible confection of familiar and new sounds," resonated with many new fans during the COVID-19 pandemic, vastly widening the band's reach.

A Way Forward, their second full-length album, was released on November 5, 2021. Devaney took inspiration from Krautrock, Kraftwerk, and early synthesizer music in the making of the album, which once released, solidified them as "mainstays of '20s synth-pop music," according to a positive review by Paste. The band made their television debut on The Late Show with Stephen Colbert in January 2022, performing their song "Across That Fine Line".

On March 8, 2023, the band released the single "Sole Obsession." On April 13, 2023, the band released the single "Weak in Your Light" and announced their next album, Strange Disciple, released on September 15, 2023. On July 26, 2023 the band released the single "Too Much, Enough" accompanied by a music video directed by filmmaker Robert Kolodny. The star studded take down of media culture featured actors Reggie Watts, Jimmi Simpson and Ruby Wolf and well as musicians Adam Green from The Moldy Peaches, Kevin Morby and Tomberlin. In November 2023, Strange Disciple topped Rough Trade's 100 Albums of 2023, landing the No. 1 spot.

Since 2018, Devaney has also been the lead vocalist for Machinegum, a side project created by the Strokes' drummer, Fabrizio Moretti.

On September 19, 2025, the band released its fourth studio album, Dance Called Memory.

== Discography ==
=== Albums ===
- Introduction, Presence (2020)
- A Way Forward (2021)
- Strange Disciple (2023)
- Dance Called Memory (2025)

=== Non-album releases ===
- "What Does the Normal Man Feel?" (2016)
- "I've Thought About Chicago" (2017)
- "Reality" (2018)
- "One More Try" (7"-exclusive track) (2020)
- "A Different Kind of Life" (2020)
- "Deliver Me from Wondering Why" (2021)
- "Again & Again (Eleanor)" (7"-exclusive track) (2022)
- "From The Hill"/"Ground Control" (7"-exclusive track) (2022)
- "Inept Apollo (Tom Sharkett remix)" (2026)

=== Covers ===
- "Gouge Away" (Pixies cover) (2020)
- "Stars and Sons" (Broken Social Scene cover) (2022)
- "Androgynous" (The Replacements cover) (2022)
- "Christmas (Baby Please Come Home)" (Darlene Love cover) (2024)
- "Auld Lang Sine Wave" (traditional) (2024)
- "Tougher Than the Rest" (Bruce Springsteen cover) (2026)

=== Singles ===
Song	Year	Peak chart positions	Album
Song	Year	US AAA	Album
"Inept Apollo"	2025	17	Dance Called Memory
"I'm Not Ready For the Change"	2025	30	Dance Called Memory
