= Four Days Away =

Studio album by John Mark Nelson
- Released: July 13, 2017
- Recorded: Glenwood City, WI at the Everwood Farmstead; May 29 to June 2, 2017
- Length: 37:31
- Producer: John Mark Nelson; Matt Patrick

John Mark Nelson chronology
I'm Not Afraid (2014)	Four Days Away (2017)

Four Days Away is the fifth studio album released by the American singer-songwriter John Mark Nelson on July 13, 2017.

== Background ==
On September 11, 2015, Nelson released its third studio album I'm Not Afraid. After this was released he started to write and compose some songs for his upcoming album. Nelson stated that he started writing the album, but the process took longer and he didn't seem to find a way to finish the record, so he decided on starting the process from the scratch. On May 29, 2017, he left for Everwood Farmstead at Glenwood City, WI and started recording the new album ending the process on July 2. Four Days Away carries the concept of the album recorded on four days. He stated about the album production, "Each song was recorded using just two microphones, a few instruments, a Princeton amp, and was mixed using only EQ and compression.".

The album was released by Nelson on Bandcamp for free download.

== Track listing ==
No.	Title	Length
1.	"May 29, 2017"	1:34
2.	"True Love"	3:43
3.	"Backwards"	3:57
4.	"All the Same"	4:41
5.	"Sarah (Interlude)"	2:54
6.	"Where Does That Leave Us?"	2:29
7.	"This Wilderness"	5:23
8.	"New"	3:35
9.	"The End"	4:50
10.	"Little Notions"	4:21

== Personnel ==
- John Mark Nelson – vocals, songwriting, guitar, co-producer
- Huntley Miller – Audio mastering
- Sarah Nelson – cover art
- Lisa Albinson – design
