= Into the Sun =

Into the Sun may refer to:

== Fiction ==
- Into the Sun (1992 film), an American action comedy starring Michael Paré and Anthony Michael Hall
- Into the Sun (2005 film), an American/Japanese action film starring Steven Seagal
- Into the Sun & Other Stories, a 1980 short-story collection by Robert Duncan Milne

== Music ==
=== Albums ===
- Into the Sun (Bassnectar album), 2015
- Into the Sun (Candlebox album), 2008
- Into the Sun (Randy Brecker album), 1997
- Into the Sun (Sean Lennon album), 1998
- Into the Sun (Robben Ford album), 2015

=== Songs ===
- "Into the Sun" (Tarja song), 2012
- "Into the Sun", by Candlebox from Into the Sun
- "Into the Sun", by Grand Funk Railroad from On Time
- "Into the Sun", by Jann Arden from Blood Red Cherry
- "Into the Sun", by Lifehouse from the self-titled album
- "Into the Sun", by the Static Jacks from If You're Young
- "Into the Sun", by BTS from Arirang
