= CRUISR =

American indie band

- Origin: Philadelphia, Pennsylvania, United States
- Genres: Indie pop, surf pop
- Years active: 2012–present
- Label: Vagrant
- Members: Andy States; Jon Van Dine; Bruno Catrambone; touring members: Wesley Bunch, Paul Casper
- Past members: Kyle Cook
- Website: www.cruisrtheband.com

CRUISR (pronounced cruiser) is an American indie pop band based in Philadelphia. They are signed to Vagrant Records. The line-up consists of Andy States (Vocals, Guitar), Jon Van Dine (Drums), and Bruno Catrambone (Guitar).

== Background ==
CRUISR's beginnings date back to 2012 as a solo project of lead singer, Andy States. States wrote and recorded the band's first EP in his Philadelphia bedroom, fixated on the idea of what it means to craft a pop song.

"I have an obsession with writing pop music and the idea that songs can transcend people," States says. "I saw that producer Jeremy Park started writing blog articles about how he recorded Youth Lagoon, so I wrote to him and sent him my songs asking for advice and knowledge. He wrote back and loved my stuff and helped me produce the first EP."

The "Cruiser EP" garnered attention on various blogs and led to the expansion of the band.

== 2014 ==
In 2014, the band released their debut single, "All Over", working with producer Andrew Maury (RAC, Panama Wedding, Ra Ra Riot). They also landed spots at Budweiser Made in America Festival, as well as Firefly Music Festival and a full North American tour with The 1975.

== 2015 ==
In 2015, the band performed at Hangout Fest, various dates with Bleachers and Joywave, opened for Imagine Dragons in Philadelphia and once again at Firefly Music Festival. They toured in July and August with Young Rising Sons and Hunter Hunted beginning on July 25 in Salt Lake City, Utah.

== 2016 ==
On May 4, bassist Kyle Cook departed from the band to focus on his design career. They announced this via the band's Facebook account.

On July 17, they released a brand new 2-track single titled "Throw Shade", which also includes a b-side, "Moving to Neptune".

Starting May 11, CRUISR supported PVRIS on a full U.S. tour along with Lydia.

On Nov 19, CRUISR supported AGAINST THE CURRENT on their "In Our Bones" North America tour.

== 2018 ==
In March and April, CRUISR supported Matt & Kim on the first leg of their North American tour.

On April 19, CRUISR released their first single since 2016 titled 'Mind Eraser', which was featured on Spotify's New Music Friday playlist.

== Band members ==
=== Current members ===
- Andy States — lead vocals, rhythm guitar (2012–present)
- Jon Van Dine — drums (2012–present)
- Bruno Catrambone — lead guitar, keyboards (2014–present)

=== Touring members ===
- Wesley Bunch — bass guitar (2016)
- Paul Impellizeri — bass guitar (2016–2017)
- Peter Pantina — bass guitar

=== Former members ===
- Kyle Cook — bass guitar (2012–16)

== Discography ==
=== Albums ===
- CRUISR (2015)

=== EPs ===
- Cruiser (2012)
- "All Over" (2014)

=== Singles ===
- "Go For It" (2015)
- "Throw Shade" (2015)
- "Take That" (2016)
- "Mind Eraser" (2018)
- "Opening Up" (2019)
- "Get Out" (2019)
- "Thick and Thin" (2022)
