= Sings the Moon =

Studio album by John Mark Nelson
- Released: June 24, 2014
- Recorded: The Library Recording Studio; First Covenant Church
- Producers: John Mark Nelson; Matt Patrick

John Mark Nelson chronology
Waiting and Waiting (2012)	Sings the Moon (2014)	I'm Not Afraid (2015)

Sings the Moon is the third studio album released by the American artist John Mark Nelson on June 24, 2014. To fund the album production Nelson released a Kickstarter campaign and raised the goal on February 7, 2013.

== Background ==
On August 12, 2012, Nelson released his second album Waiting and Waiting. After this was released he started to write and compose some songs for his upcoming album. Nelson said about the album "The next album will explore the idea of life, looking at the various seasons in which we find ourselves over the course of a lifetime. From the warm haze of childhood, to the bleak uncertainty of old age, this record explores the emotions we are faced with throughout our human lives". On the Kickstarter page, that was launched on January 17, 2013, and funded on February 7, 2013, with the goal of $16,735. The album was produced by Matt Patrick in collaboration with Nelson.

To write and compose the sounds for Sings The Moon, Nelson used full-band arrangements, vignettes, guitar and piano, percussion, strings, horns, mandolin and accordion.

The album's first single "The Moon and the Stars" was released on MTV on 13 August 2013. The music video was directed by Will Keeler. His second single "Boy", was directed by Mairin Hart and released on October 22, 2014.

== Track listing ==
No.	Title	Length
1.	"Sings The Moon"	1:15
2.	"A Place Of My Own"	4:20
3.	"Drowned"	1:29
4.	"Shorebird"	5:10
5.	"When We Grow Old"	0:54
6.	"Boy"	3:57
7.	"To Belong"	0:56
8.	"The Moon and The Stars"	3:47
9.	"Awash"	1:44
10.	"Far From Here"	4:06
11.	"Oh, Light Within Us!"	2:45
12.	"All You Are"	6:01
13.	"Ernest"	2:08
14.	"Cigarettes & Postage Stamps"	6:26
15.	"Deep In The Night"	4:21

== Personnel ==
- John Mark Nelson – vocals, songwriting, guitar, co-producer
- Matt Patrick – producer
- Matt Patrick – mixing
- Heather Weideman – artwork and Illustration
- Matthew Custar – layout and design
