= John Mark Nelson =

- Born: November 23, 1993 (age 32); Laguna Beach, California
- Occupations: Musician, singer-songwriter
- Instruments: Guitars, Keyboards, Drums
- Years active: 2011-Present
- Label: GRNDWIRE Records
- Website: johnmarknelson.com

John Mark Nelson (born November 23, 1993) is an American songwriter and producer based in Minneapolis, Minnesota. John Mark Nelson released his debut album Still Here in 2011. His second release, Waiting and Waiting, was released in August 2012. In June 2014, Nelson released his third album, Sings the Moon, thanks to a successful Kickstarter campaign that helped him fund the project. His fourth full-length album, I'm Not Afraid, was released in September 2015 on GRNDWIRE Records.

== Early life ==
Nelson was born in Laguna Beach, California, on November 23, 1993. He attended Minnetonka High School and graduated there in 2012.

== History ==
=== 2011: Still Here ===
Nelson grew up around music, as his immediate family was composed of musicians. When he has 14 years old, Nelson started to learn instruments and arrange original compositions. At 17, he spent the fall and the winters crafting songs at home, and in 2011, he put this record together and released his first full-length, Still Here released independently on 29 December, 2011. He does not have the intention to be a songwriter.

=== 2012: Waiting and Waiting ===
After graduating from Minnetonka High School, he produced his second full-length album, Waiting and Waiting released independently on 12 August, 2012. The album was released with a sold-out show on Observer Drift and Husky and had songs featured on seven local radio stations. In December 2012, Nelson participated in a project called Minnesota Beatles Project Volume 4, recording the Beatles' song, A Day in the Life.

=== 2014: Sings the Moon ===
On January 17, 2013, Nelson launched a Kickstarter campaign to fund his third album production. The campaign was funded on February 7, 2013 with the goal of $16,735. The album was produced by Matt Patrick with co-production of Nelson. One of the songs on Sings the Moon, titled "The Moon and the Stars," was featured as his first music video and aired on MTV on August 13, 2013. On June 24, 2014 he released the album Sings the Moon. For this effort, rather than playing and engineering everything at his home, Nelson opted for a professional studio recording and chose the Library Recording Studio in Minneapolis. Sings the Moon was co-produced by The Library Studio's owner/operator Matt Patrick (producer). He employed his live band; Nate Babbs, Benjamin Kelly, Nic Eggert, Grace Keating but also brought in several guest musicians; Jeremy Messersmith, Jeremy Ylvisaker, Matt Patrick (producer), Aaron Fabbrini, Ben Rosenbush, Kara Laudon, Anne Hartnett, Zach Miller, Jim O'Neill, John Cushing, Josh Misner, and Kenni Holmen. Nelson released the album's second single "Boy" was directed by Mairin Hart and released on YouTube on October 22, 2014.

=== 2015: I'm Not Afraid ===
Nelson returned to The Library Recording Studio to record his fourth full-length album, this time working with Jacob Hanson as co-producer. Nelson took a different direction on the album, moving away from straightforward folk to a pop-rock sound driven by drums, bass and more adventurous guitar tones. The album was completed after five days in the studio. In May 2015, Nelson signed with GRNDWIRE Records, a record label started by Dave Simonett of Trampled By Turtles and Mark Gehring, and in July, booking agency The Billions Corporation added Nelson to its artist roster. I'm Not Afraid was released on GRNDWIRE Records on September 11, 2015, with a show at First Avenue marking the occasion.

=== 2017: Four Days Away ===
After the release of his last album, Nelson began writing the following up and according to him, the process wasn't going well, "I had spent the better part of two years working on a record that I just couldn’t seem to finish", so he left to Everwood Farmstead at Glenwood City, Wisconsin and started recording the record from the scratch. The album is titled Four Days Away as it was recorded on the four days that Nelson have spent in the barn. " I challenged myself to write and record an album in four days" stated Nelson.

=== Other projects ===
Nelson co-wrote and produced Devon Cole's "W.I.T.C.H.".

== Discography ==
=== Albums ===
- Still Here (2011)
- Waiting and Waiting (2012)
- Sings the Moon (2014)
- I'm Not Afraid (2015)
- Four Days Away (2017)

=== Singles ===
- "The Moon and The Stars" (2013)
- "Boy" (2014)
- "Dream Last Night" (2015)
- "This Year's Gonna Be Different" (2023)
