= Greycoats (band) =

American indie rock group

- Origin: Minneapolis, Minnesota, United States
- Genres: Indie rock
- Labels: Unsigned
- Members: Jon Reine; Titus Decker; Matt Patrick; Mike Smith; Cooper Doten

Greycoats are an indie rock group from Minneapolis, Minnesota, United States.

== History ==
Greycoats released their first album, Setting Fire to the Great Unknown, produced by Matt Patrick, at Two Pillars Studio in 2008. In 2013, they released their second album, World of Tomorrow, which was co-produced by Patrick and Jeremy Ylvisaker at the Library Recording Studio in Minneapolis. Their third album, Adrift, was released November 13, 2015 on Ephemera Records and was produced by Patrick at the Library Recording Studio. A collection of songs related to the Adrift sessions were released on an EP entitled Hypersleep on July 28, 2017.

Their music has been featured on the Netflix original series Orange Is the New Black, The CW's Gossip Girl, MTV's Teen Mom 3, and Lifetime's Witches of East End.

Greycoats toured the U.S. extensively for their debut album, playing shows with Foals, Liam Finn, Jeremy Messersmith, Javalin, and Fanfarlo, as well as playing at the CMJ Music Festival.

== Band members ==
- Jon Reine: vocals, guitar, keys
- Titus Decker: keys, guitar, vocals
- Mike Smith: drums, vocals
- Matt Patrick: electric guitar, vocals
- Cooper Doten: bass, vocals

== Musical style ==
Greycoats' style can be described as melodramatic. They invoke an Orwellian theme in both their lyrics and communication with fans. They often include video running along in the background at live shows. Videos have included images from movies such as The NeverEnding Story, Animal Farm, and Paradise Now.

== Discography ==
- Setting Fire to the Great Unknown, 2008
- Helicline (EP), 2012
- World of Tomorrow, 2013
- Adrift, 2015
- Hypersleep (EP), 2017
- Charisma, 2018

Singles:

- "Make Me Like the Moon 2012", 2012
- "California", 2014

Appearances:

- Nowhere Man, MN Beatle Project Vol. 5, 2014
