= Waiting and Waiting =

Studio album by John Mark Nelson
- Released: August 12, 2012
- Recorded: 2012
- Genre: Folk, Acoustic, Pop
- Length: 39:04
- Language: English
- Label: Independently

John Mark Nelson chronology
| Still Here (2011) | Waiting and Waiting (2012) | Sings the Moon (2014) |

Waiting and Waiting is the second full-length album by John Mark Nelson, released on 12 August 2012. Nelson supported the album release with performances at the Minnesota State Fair and live sessions at 89.3 The Current studios. The album received extensive playing time in the Minneapolis/St. Paul metro area with the single "Reminisce" voted #60 on the annual 89.3 The Current Top 89 Songs of 2012.

== Track listing ==
| No. | Title | Length |
|---|---|---|
| 1. | "Overture" | 01:08 |
| 2. | "Home" | 04:36 |
| 3. | "What Did I Find?" | 03:25 |
| 4. | "Beating in My Heart" | 04:01 |
| 5. | "You Are Tired" | 05:13 |
| 6. | "The Shore" | 03:54 |
| 7. | "Rain Comes Down" | 04:35 |
| 8. | "Worst to Forget" | 02:34 |
| 9. | "Reminisce" | 03:37 |
| 10. | "Waiting and Waiting" | 06:01 |
| Total length: | | 39:04 |
