= Parallel Play (EP) =

EP by Panama Wedding
- Released: June 3, 2014
- Recorded: 2013–2014
- Genre: Indie pop, synthpop, indietronica
- Label: Glassnote
- Producer: Peter Kirk, Andrew Maury, Eric Sanicola

Singles from Parallel Play
- 1. "All of the People" Released: July 23, 2013

Parallel Play is the debut extended play by New York City based synthpop band, Panama Wedding. It was released through Glassnote Records on June 3, 2014.

== Track listing ==
All songs written by Peter Kirk

1. "All of the People" – 3:36
2. "Uma" – 3:36
3. "Trust" – 3:53
4. "Feels Like Summer" – 4:10

== Charts ==
| Chart (2014) | Peak position |
|---|---|
| US Top Heatseekers Albums (Billboard) | 22 |
