= All of the People =

Single by Panama Wedding

from the album Parallel Play
- Released: July 23, 2013
- Genre: Synthpop, indietronica
- Length: 3:36
- Label: Glassnote
- Songwriter(s): Peter Kirk, Eric Sanicola
- Producer(s): Peter Kirk, Eric Sanicola

"All of the People" is a song by American synthpop band Panama Wedding. It was released on July 23, 2013 as the band's debut single and was later included on their debut extended play, Parallel Play.

== Composition ==
"All of the People" is written in the key of F major. The song has a tempo of 90 beats per minute.

== Music video ==
On April 1, 2014, a lyric video for "All of the People" was uploaded to YouTube by the band's official Vevo account.

== Charts ==
Chart (2014)	Peak position
US Alternative Airplay (Billboard)	37
