= I'm Not Afraid =

Studio album by John Mark Nelson
- Released: September 11, 2015
- Genre: Ambient, folk rock
- Length: 36:29
- Label: GNDWIRE Records
- Producer: John Mark Nelson; Matt Patrick

John Mark Nelson chronology
'Sings the Moon' (2014)	I'm Not Afraid (2015)	'Four Days Away' (2017)

I'm Not Afraid is the fourth full-length album released by John Mark Nelson on September 11, 2015.

== Track listing ==
No.	Title	Length
1.	"After All I've Done"	4:11
2.	"Dream Last Night"	4:01
3.	"I'll Give You More"	4:20
4.	"Hole in Our Skin!"	3:37
5.	"I'm Not Afraid"	2:09
6.	"A Hundred Orchards"	5:02
7.	"Broken"	3:37
8.	"Control"	3:20
9.	"That's What You Do"	3:59
10.	"I Won't Win (If I Let You In)"	2:13
Total length:		36:29
