= Strange Disciple =

Studio album by Nation of Language
- Released: September 15, 2023
- Length: 44:02
- Label: PIAS
- Producer: Nick Millhiser

Nation of Language chronology
A Way Forward (2021)	Strange Disciple (2023)	Dance Called Memory (2025)

Singles from Strange Disciple
- 1. "Sole Obsession" Released: March 8, 2023; 2. "Weak in Your Light" Released: April 13, 2023; 3. "Stumbling Still" Released: May 17, 2023; 4. "Too Much, Enough" Released: July 26, 2023; 5. "Sightseer" Released: September 11, 2023

Strange Disciple is the third studio album by American synth-pop band Nation of Language, released on September 15, 2023 via PIAS. It is their first album since A Way Forward in 2021.

== Background ==
The first single, "Sole Obsession", was released on March 8, 2023. The album was announced on April 13, 2023, with the release of the single "Weak in Your Light". A third single, "Stumbling Still", was released on May 17, 2023. The fourth single, "Too Much, Enough", was released on July 26, 2023. A fifth and final single, "Sightseer", was released on September 11, 2023. According to the band, the album's central theme is "infatuation and how one's reality can be warped by it." The album was produced by Nick Millhiser of Holy Ghost!. It marks the addition of bassist Alex MacKay, following the departure of Michael Sue-Poi.

== Reception ==
Professional ratings
Aggregate scores
Source	Rating
Metacritic	78/100
Review scores
Source	Rating
AllMusic	4/5 stars
Clash	8/10
NME	4/5 stars
Pitchfork	7.3/10

Strange Disciple received a score of 78 out of 100 on review aggregator Metacritic based on six critics' reviews, indicating "generally favorable" reception. Erica Campbell of NME said, "With their third album, Nation Of Language prove their able to stretch their auditory imagination, all while sticking to their roots." Similarly, AllMusic's Marcy Donelson writes how the band "adhere strictly to a core timbral palette and, at least so far, always sound like themselves." Reviewing the album for Pitchfork, Hattie Lindert called the album "another achievement in economy, a project that looks to the sound of new wave as a springboard, not a textbook, and lets small touches shine". In a more mixed assessment, Leo Lawton of Loud and Quiet wrote, "If you were to wedge this album in between those of OMD, Gary Numan and the Jesus and Mary Chain, Strange Disciple might become slightly easier to locate... Whilst this record may lack much stylistic disparity across each track, I can't argue with the fact that Nation of Language's late-'80s pastiche is very well executed."

== Track listing ==
All tracks are written by Nation of Language.

Strange Disciple track listing
No.	Title	Length
1.	"Weak in Your Light"	4:15
2.	"Sole Obsession"	4:16
3.	"Surely I Can't Wait"	4:03
4.	"Swimming in the Shallow Sea"	4:37
5.	"Too Much, Enough"	4:51
6.	"Spare Me the Decision"	2:46
7.	"Sightseer"	4:19
8.	"Stumbling Still"	4:39
9.	"A New Goodbye"	5:21
10.	"I Will Never Learn"	4:55
Total length:		44:02

== Personnel ==
Nation of Language

- Ian Richard Devaney – vocals, synthesizer, bass, guitar, layout
- Aidan Noell – synthesizer, vocals, layout
- Alex MacKay – bass, vocals, layout

Additional contributors

- Nick Millhiser – production, mixing, synthesizer, drums
- Heba Kadry – mastering
- Noah Rubin – drums
- Christian Little – cover artwork
- Allyson Leigh Peck – layout

== Charts ==
Chart performance for Strange Disciple
Chart (2023)	Peak position
Scottish Albums (Official Charts)	29
UK Album Downloads (Official Charts)	49
UK Independent Albums (Official Charts)	12
