= A Way Forward =

Studio album by Nation of Language
- Released: November 5, 2021
- Genres: Synth-pop; post-punk
- Length: 44:05
- Label: PIAS Recordings
- Producers: Abe Seiferth; Nick Millhiser

Nation of Language chronology
Introduction, Presence (2020)	A Way Forward (2021)	Strange Disciple (2023)

Singles from A Way Forward
- 1. "Across That Fine Line" Released: June 3, 2021; 2. "Wounds of Love" Released: July 8, 2021; 3. "This Fractured Mind" Released: August 5, 2021; 4. "A Word & A Wave" Released: September 9, 2021; 5. "The Grey Commute" Released: October 20, 2021

A Way Forward is the second studio album by American synth-pop band, Nation of Language. The album was released on November 5, 2021, and was their last to feature original bassist Michael Sue-Poi before his departure in 2022.

== Background ==
The album was announced on June 3, 2021, with the release of the first single "Across That Fine Line". Three variations of the vinyl record were made available: a standard black color, a red and blue blend sold from Rough Trade Records, and a coke-bottle-clear color sold through the band's webstore. Rough Trade also offered a bonus CD which features alternate versions of the tracks "A Word & A Wave", "In Manhattan" and "Miranda", plus a remix of the band's 2020 single "A Different Kind of Life" by producer Nick Millhiser.

== Reception ==
Professional ratings
Aggregate scores
Source	Rating
Metacritic	76/100
Review scores
Source	Rating
AllMusic	3.5/5 stars
God Is in the TV	8/10
Mojo	3/5 stars
NME	5/5 stars
Paste	8.2/10
Pitchfork	7.0/10

The album received a Metacritic score of 76 out of 100, which indicates generally favorable reviews.

Austin Brown of Pitchfork said, "The band’s decision to expand their swagger and invest in more complex synth work pushes them to new territory, and the most remarkable digressions from their comfort zone point towards a future beyond pastiche." Similarly, Allmusic's Marcy Donelson writes how, "the detailing and variable arrangements here, combined with engaging songs, lift A Way Forward above the level of genre exercise, occasionally into something more compositional".

== Track listing ==
All lyrics are written by Nation of Language; all music is composed by Ian Richard Devaney, Aidan Noell, and Michael Sue-Poi.

No.	Title	Length
1.	"In Manhattan"	3:53
2.	"Across That Fine Line"	5:25
3.	"Wounds of Love"	3:19
4.	"Miranda"	3:42
5.	"The Grey Commute"	3:37
6.	"This Fractured Mind"	5:20
7.	"Former Self"	5:10
8.	"Whatever You Want"	4:53
9.	"A Word & A Wave"	3:52
10.	"They're Beckoning"	4:49
Total length:		44:05

- Tracks 1, 4, 7, 9 and 10 were produced and mixed by Nick Millhiser.
- Tracks 2, 3, 5, 6 and 8 were produced and mixed by Abe Seiferth.

== Charts ==
Chart performance for A Way Forward
Chart (2022)	Peak position
UK Independent Albums (Official Charts)	13
