= Still Here (John Mark Nelson album) =

Studio album by John Mark Nelson
- Released: December 29, 2011
- Recorded: 2011
- Genre: Folk, ambient, acoustic
- Length: 50:49
- Language: English
- Label: Independently

John Mark Nelson chronology
Still Here (2011)	Waiting and Waiting (2012)

Still Here is the first full-length album released by John Mark Nelson on 29 December 2011. The songs for this album were crafted when Nelson was 17 years of age. The album was featured on the local radio stations of Minnesota. After this album, Nelson decided to stop his music career for a short time.

== Track listing ==
No.	Title	Length
1.	"North St. Paul/Silver Lake"	5:20
2.	"Columbia"	5:22
3.	"In Your Sailboat"	4:03
4.	"Great Plains"	5:00
5.	"Taylors Falls"	3:24
6.	"The Bottom of a Well"	6:07
7.	"February, 26th"	3:02
8.	"I'm Terrible"	3:44
9.	"Giant's Bridge-Arcola"	4:08
10.	"Hello from the Interstate!"	5:45
11.	"4 Pianos (Closing Comments)"	4:54
Total length:		50:49
