= Dance Called Memory =

Studio album by Nation of Language
- Released: September 19, 2025
- Genre: Synth-pop
- Length: 41:25
- Label: Sub Pop
- Producer: Nick Millhiser

Nation of Language chronology
Strange Disciple (2023)	Dance Called Memory (2025)

Singles from Dance Called Memory
- 1. "Inept Apollo" Released: May 15, 2025; 2. "I'm Not Ready for the Change" Released: June 16, 2025; 3. "Under the Water" Released: July 22, 2025; 4. "In Your Head" Released: August 19, 2025; 5. "Silhouette" Released: November 5, 2025; 6. "In Another Life" Released: November 24, 2025

Dance Called Memory is the fourth studio album by American indie pop band Nation of Language. It was released on September 19, 2025, via Sub Pop in LP, CD and digital formats.

== Background ==
The album was produced by Holy Ghost! member Nick Millhiser, who also recorded and mixed it, and mastered by Heba Kadry. The band's debut release on Sub Pop, it features ten songs and succeeds the band's 2023 full-length release, Strange Disciple.

"Inept Apollo" was released on May 15, 2025, as the first single of the album, alongside a music video directed by John MacKay. It was followed by the second single, "I'm Not Ready for the Change", on June 16, 2025.

== Reception ==
Professional ratings
Aggregate scores
Source	Rating
Metacritic	82/100
Review scores
Source	Rating
AllMusic	4/5 stars
Dork	4/5
KTLA	8.9/10
The Line of Best Fit	7/10
Mojo	4/5 stars
Paste	8.0/10
PopMatters	7/10
Under the Radar	6.5/10

Flood Magazine referred to the album as "a fuzzy electronic project that's both introspective and danceable, with flanged New Order–styled guitar parts sprinkled in to give their sound a refreshed feel." Hester Aalberts of Dutch music magazine Oor praised Ian Devaney's voice saying it "marinates so well" with the album, noting that it is "melodically perfectly fine". John Aizlewood of Mojo said, "At their best... they offer a seemingly contradictory melancholic uplift", and he concluded, "Yes, they're flavour of the month, but they're the real deal too."

AllMusic's Marcy Donelson described the album as "danceable, eccentric, and immaculate at once, often using space to emphasize alienation as well as its shifting minimalist instrumentation." BrooklynVegan commented that Dance Called Memory "feels closer to Cocteau Twins or My Bloody Valentine than Kraftwerk," calling it the "first Nation of Language album where guitar may actually be the most prominent instrument."

The album received a rating of seven from PopMatters reviewer John Bergstrom, who remarked about the album that it is "full of squiggly, pulsating vintage synthesizer sounds and steady electronic beats" and called it the band's "most introspective and darkest record to date." Writing for The Line of Best Fit, Michael Hoffman gave the project a score of seven and referred to it as "a very good Nation of Language album – perhaps their most tonally varied since the debut."

== Track listing ==
All tracks are written by Nation of Language.

Dance Called Memory track listing
No.	Title	Length
1.	"Can't Face Another One"	3:52
2.	"In Another Life"	3:49
3.	"Silhouette"	3:50
4.	"Now That You're Gone"	5:04
5.	"I'm Not Ready for the Change"	4:47
6.	"Can You Reach Me?"	4:17
7.	"Inept Apollo"	4:01
8.	"Under the Water"	3:28
9.	"In Your Head"	4:56
10.	"Nights of Weight"	3:21
Total length:		41:25

== Personnel ==
Credits adapted from the album's liner notes.

=== Nation of Language ===
- Ian Richard Devaney – vocals, synthesizer, guitar, bass, percussion, harmonica, artwork, layout, photography
- Aidan Noell – vocals, synthesizer, percussion, artwork, layout
- Alex MacKay – vocals, bass, artwork, layout

=== Additional contributors ===
- Nick Millhiser – production, mixing, synthesizer
- Heba Kadry – mastering
- Allyson Leigh Peck – artwork, layout

== Charts ==
Chart performance for Dance Called Memory
Chart (2025)	Peak position
French Rock & Metal Albums (SNEP)	74
Scottish Albums (Official Charts)	35
UK Albums Sales (OCC)	28
UK Independent Albums (Official Charts)	10
US Top Album Sales (Billboard)	30
