= The Static Jacks =

American rock band

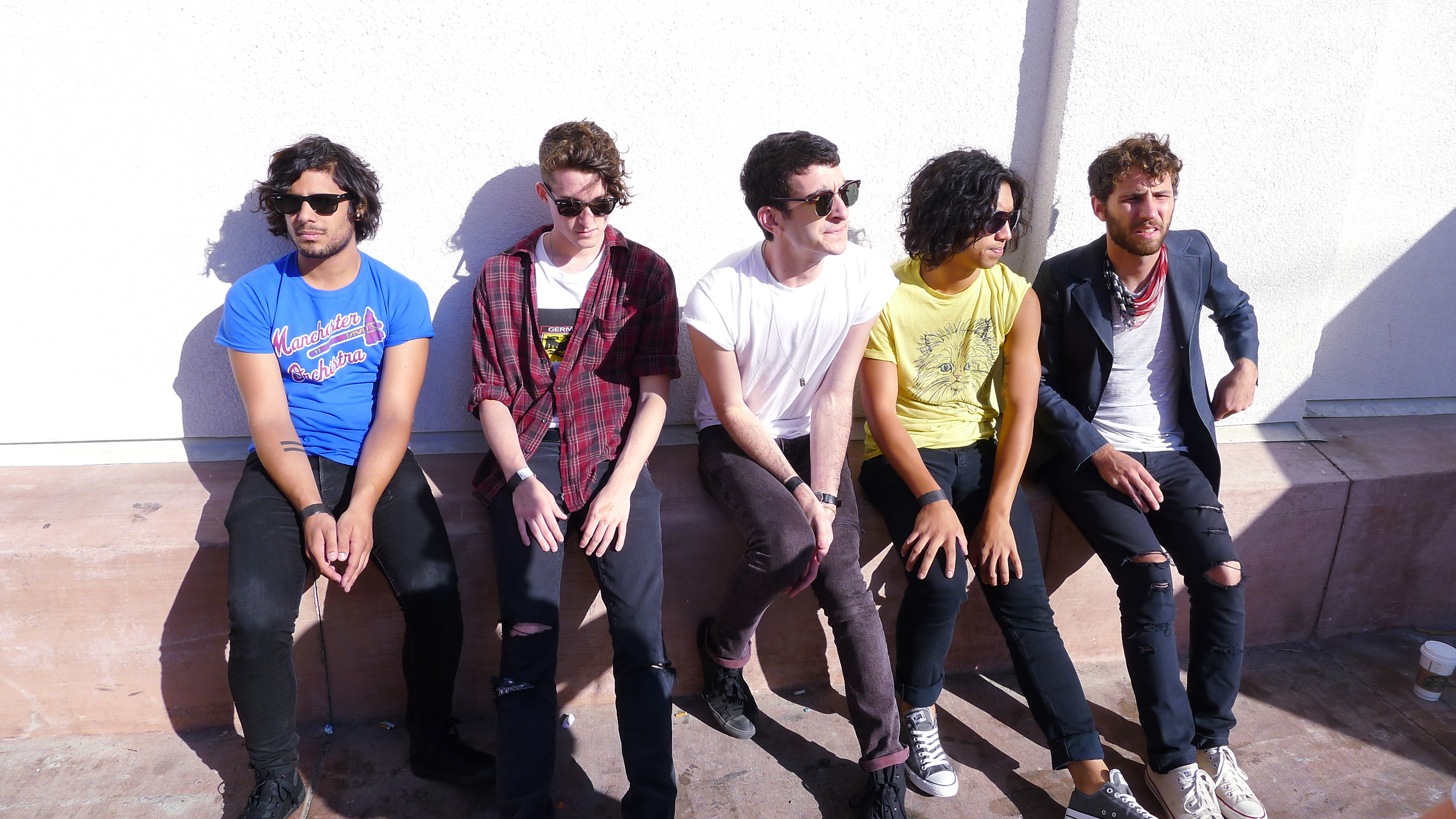
- The Static Jacks in Huntington Beach, CA during the US Open of Surfing, Aug 2011

Background information
- Origin: Westfield, New Jersey, US
- Genres: Indie rock, punk, grunge
- Years active: 2007–2014
- Labels: Old Friends Records, Fearless Records
- Members: Henry Kaye; Ian Devaney; Michael Sue-Poi; Nick Brennan
- Past members: Spencer Kimmins
- Website: thestaticjacks.com

The Static Jacks are an American rock band from Westfield, New Jersey, consisting of singer Ian Devaney, guitarist Henry Kaye, guitarist Michael Sue-Poi, and drummer Nick Brennan.

== History ==
=== Formation (2007–2010) ===
Devaney, Kaye, and Brennan started playing together their first year of high school for a class project on the Harlem Renaissance. A short time later they began writing songs with some other friends. Each attended separate universities for one semester before leaving to continue playing music together, along with then-bassist Spencer Kimmins. After putting up "guitarist wanted" flyers in local music stores, they received a call from Sue-Poi, who was interested in trying out and allegedly ripped down the flyer so no one else could contact the band.

In the middle of a conversation about how the group wanted someone to produce their next recording, they received an email from Andrew Maury, who had remixed one of their songs for Remix Artist Collective, offering his services as a producer. Music blog "Pop Tarts Suck Toasted" included The Static Jacks in their "Best Newish New Jersey Bands" feature of the Top 10 Jersey Bands Ever in 2009. Shortly afterwards, in the Spring of 2009, they recorded the Laces EP, setting up a makeshift studio in a local church. After a series of small tours around the Northeast in support of the EP in their parent's cars, the band decided it was time to get a van, and took to busking in New York City parks for money. After several months of this, they had enough money to buy a van, and did so, from an armed man in camouflage pants.

=== If You're Young and Spray Tan (2011–2013) ===
The Static Jacks were signed by Fearless Records in 2011. They spent the next year writing and touring, until early 2012, when they began recording their debut full-length album, If You're Young, with the producer Chris Shaw. The album was recorded at Stratosphere Sound in NYC, owned by Adam Schlesinger of Fountains of Wayne and James Iha of The Smashing Pumpkins, the latter of whom played tambourine on the album's closing track. After about two weeks of caressing the Grammy's that were lying around the office, the album was complete.

On July 25, 2011, TSJ premiered a double A-side single online consisting of "Into the Sun" and "Mercy, Hallelujah". If You're Young was released August 30, 2012, and the band then began touring extensively around the United States, UK and Europe.

On November 17, 2011, The Static Jacks made their television debut on Fuel TV's The Daily Habit. On December 21, 2011, The Static Jacks appeared on NBC's Last Call with Carson Daly.

Before If You're Young was released, the band had already started work on another EP, with Andrew Maury, entitled Spray Tan. It was recorded at a studio in Jersey City that was built inside an art-storage facility, and owned by high school friend Dan Zavaro. On April 16, a new song from the EP called "Young Guns" was streamed and offered for a free download. After this experience, the band needed no further convincing, and decided Maury would produce their next full length as well. He is currently doing so, with the album being recorded at Retromedia Studio in Red Bank, NJ.

=== In Blue (2013–2014) ===
On June 28, 2013, the band announced their new album, "In Blue", would be released on October 1, 2013. They also gave a free download of the song "I'll Come Back." The band have since remained fairly inactive, with their most recent live show in April 2014. Devaney and Sue-Poi would go on to form Nation of Language.

== Discography ==
=== Studio albums ===
| Title | Album details |
|---|---|
| If You're Young | Released: August 30, 2011 (US) / March 5, 2012 (UK/EU); Label: Fearless Records / Nobody People; Format: Digital download, CD |
| In Blue | Released: October 1, 2013; Label: Old Friends Records; Format: Digital download, CD, LP |

=== EPs ===
- Spray Tan (Spring 2012)
- Laces (September 15, 2009)
- Bridges and Tunnels (Fall 2008)
- Sonny Halliday (Fall 2007)
