= Glowing Mouth =

Studio album by Milagres
- Released: September 13, 2011
- Length: 44:18
- Label: Kill Rock Stars

Milagres chronology
Glowing Mouth (2011)	Violent Light (2014)

Professional ratings
Aggregate scores
Source	Rating
AnyDecentMusic?	6/10
Metacritic	62/100
Review scores
Source	Rating
AllMusic	3/5 stars
Consequence of Sound	C−
Drowned in Sound	4/10
NME	2/5 stars
Pitchfork	5.9/10

Glowing Mouth is the second studio album by American band Milagres. It was released on September 13, 2011 under Kill Rock Stars

== Critical reception ==
Glowing Mouth was met with generally favorable reviews from critics. At Metacritic, which assigns a weighted average rating out of 100 to reviews from mainstream publications, this release received an average score of 62, based on 15 reviews.

== Track listing ==
Glowing Mouth track listing
No.	Title	Length
1.	"Halfway"	3:54
2.	"Here to Stay"	3:09
3.	"Glowing Mouth"	6:28
4.	"Gentle Beast"	3:55
5.	"Lost in the Dark"	3:20
6.	"Fright of Thee"	3:07
7.	"Moon on the Sea's Gate"	4:13
8.	"Gone"	3:09
9.	"For Disposal"	4:52
10.	"To Be Imagined"	4:06
11.	"Doubted"	4:15
