= Weird Faith =

Studio album by Madi Diaz
- Released: February 9, 2024
- Genres: Indie rock; indie folk; indie pop
- Length: 41:21
- Label: Anti-
- Producers: Madi Diaz; Sam Cohen; Konrad Snyder

Madi Diaz chronology
History of a Feeling (2021)	Weird Faith (2024)	Fatal Optimist (2025)

Singles from Weird Faith
- 1. "Same Risk" Released: October 10, 2023; 2. "Don't Do Me Good" Released: November 14, 2023

Weird Faith is the sixth studio album by the American singer-songwriter Madi Diaz, released on February 9, 2024, by Anti-. The album followed her fifth studio album, History of a Feeling, and tours with Angel Olsen, Waxahatchee, and Harry Styles. It was written in Nashville and upstate New York, recorded in the latter by Diaz and Sam Cohen, and produced by Diaz, Cohen, and Konrad Snyder.

Weird Faith has been described as an indie rock, indie folk, and indie pop album. The album features sparse, acoustic arrangements that highlight Diaz's lyrics and vocals, and it addresses themes of love, trust, and intimacy. Critics positively reviewed the album, particularly praising Diaz's emotional songwriting. It was featured on several year-end lists and was nominated for two Grammy Awards.

== Background and production ==
Following the release of her critically acclaimed fifth studio album, History of a Feeling (2021), the Nashville-based singer-songwriter Madi Diaz went on tour and opened for Angel Olsen, Waxahatchee, and Harry Styles. She also accepted an offer from Styles to join his tour band. At the same time, Diaz began working on her sixth studio album, Weird Faith. She wrote the album at her home in Nashville and in upstate New York, where she recorded the album with Sam Cohen. Cohen co-produced the album with Diaz and Konrad Snyder.

Diaz said in an interview with Stereogum that she wrote Weird Faith during a period in her life in which she was learning to trust herself, the growth of her career, and her relationships with her new manager, new label, and new romantic partner. She told BrooklynVegan that, while writing the album, she engaged in contemplation in places of worship, and that she was influenced by the Bonticou Crag rock scramble in upstate New York, Harold Melvin & the Blue Notes' "If You Don't Know Me by Now", The Maori Girls of Turakina by the Turakina Maori Girls Choir, Julia Michaels' Not in Chronological Order, and "Like an Old Fashioned Waltz" by Sandy Denny. Diaz said in Nylon that the album was inspired by her father. She worked with several co-writers, including Olivia Barton on "Everything Almost", Steph Jones and Charlie Hickey on "Same Risk", and Lori McKenna on the title track.

== Composition ==
Weird Faith has been described as an indie rock, indie folk, and indie pop album. Critics have generally said that the album's mostly-acoustic tracks are minimalist compositions that highlight Diaz's vocals and songwriting. In No Depression, Maeri Ferguson called Diaz's songwriting "raw and direct" and the musical arrangements "[s]parse[,] ... gritty and textured". She said that the vocals ranged from being "stark" to "almost hymnal in their power". Adam Fink in Exclaim! called the musical arrangement "relatively subdued", contrasting it with the lyrics' emotional power. In Glide, Ryan Dillon stated that the album had a "very honed sonic landscape", featuring minimal arrangements that support, rather than "outshine", Diaz's vocals. Lucy Harbron in Far Out wrote that the music was straightforward, with "high-quality, plain sailing" production. She also noted that the production had sufficient layering to ensure that Diaz's lyrics did not sound "one-note". Similarly, in Pitchfork, Marissa Lorusso said that the album's production was straightforward, with moments of sound layering to highlight particular emotions. She also called Diaz's voice "resonant and emotionally rich". Jeremy Fisette in Beats Per Minute likewise praised Diaz's voice for its "immense power and subtle heartache", but criticized the album's uniform tempos, slow pacing, and simple production.

== Themes ==
According to critics, Weird Faith addresses themes of love, trust, and intimacy. Mia Hughes in Stereogum, Fisette in Beats Per Minute, and Fink in Exclaim! wrote that, by contrast with History of a Feeling, which addressed the end of a relationship, Weird Faith was written from the perspective of falling in love, as well as the complications that can arise early in a relationship. Likewise, in Glide, Dillon said that the album focuses on a new relationship and the difficulties associated with falling in love, which he viewed as a metaphor for Diaz's relationship with her career and newfound fame, and the anxieties surrounding them. Comparing "Think of Me" from History of a Feeling with "Girlfriend" on Weird Faith, Eric Bennett in Paste wrote that instead of directing "betrayal and hurt" towards her "cheating ex and his new partner", Diaz now "extends grace" towards her new boyfriend's ex-girlfriend, being honest and open with her emotions and insecurities. Rhian Daly wrote in The Forty-Five that Diaz's "penetrative lyrics" focus on themes of love and trust, as well as Diaz's relationships with herself and others, and her "fears and trepidations, insecurities and overthinking". Lorusso in Pitchfork said that the album captures the "paradox" that while falling in love can be beautiful, it is also "absurd and mortifying". In an interview with Exclaim!, Diaz acknowledged that while faith can be a "triggering word" for many people, it is an indescribable form of peace for herself. She said that the album was about "having some weird faith and walking forward" when falling in love in a new relationship.

In Nashville Scene, Jacqueline Zeisloft also highlighted the theme of intimacy, writing that Diaz "conveys the beautiful messiness of sustaining a long-term relationship". Ferguson said that the album "navigate[s] the uneven terrain of intimacy"—including confronting jealousy, personality flaws, and insecurities—particularly the moment "when the dust settles" and a person is confronted with rebuilding a relationship. Similarly, Steffanee Wang in Nylon wrote that the album is about "love and unhealthy cycles", featuring "bare-boned confessionals" about Diaz's "neurotic habits, toxic thought patterns, and an ever-hopeful desire to be better". Marcy Donelson wrote for AllMusic that the album "shines a blue light on the dark underbelly of love, where the flaws, compromises, and insecurities lie".

== Release and promotion ==
Weird Faith is Diaz's sixth studio album. It was released on February 9, 2024, by Anti-. On February 10, Diaz played the song "Everything Almost" from the album on The Tonight Show. She began the Weird Faith tour to support the album on February 12. Anti- released a deluxe edition of the album on October 25. It includes a version of the album track "For Months Now" featuring Lizzy McAlpine, a new single titled "Worst Case Scenario", a song titled "One Less Question" featuring Lennon Stella, and several demo tracks.

== Critical reception ==
Professional ratings
Aggregate scores
Source	Rating
AnyDecentMusic?	7.6/10
Metacritic	81/100
Review scores
Source	Rating
AllMusic	4/5 stars
DIY	4/5 stars
Beats Per Minute	72%
Exclaim!	8/10
Far Out	3.5/5 stars
The Forty-Five	4.5/5 stars
The Line of Best Fit	7/10
Paste	8.2/10
Pitchfork	7.3/10
Under the Radar	7.5/10 stars

Weird Faith received a score of 81 out of 100 on review aggregator Metacritic based on nine critics' reviews, indicating "universal acclaim". Critics praised the album for Diaz's songwriting and production. Fink in Exclaim! rated the album an 8 out of 10, praising the production and writing that Diaz's songwriting was "plainly spoken" and relatable. For Glide, Dillon wrote that Diaz's "blunt" songwriting centers a "mostly ambient" production. In Paste, Bennett rated the album an 8.2 out of 10 and called Diaz's songwriting "stylized but diaristic"; he also said that the album highlighted Diaz's vocals, but that the instrumentation "felt like a second thought" on some tracks. In The Forty-Five, Daly rated the album 4.5 out of 5 stars and said that Diaz's songwriting places the listener in different scenes. Fisette, who rated the album 72% for Beats Per Minute, praised Diaz's songwriting and the album's honesty.

Critics also praised the album's tone. Sarah Taylor of DIY rated the album 4 out of 5 stars, calling the tracks "wistful yet self-aware", with Diaz striking a "defiant" tone and proclaiming "her faith in love". Caleb Campbell, who rated the album 7.5 out of 10 stars for Under the Radar, said that the album was "often tender and unfussed in presentation, yet full of unsparing honesty". Writing for Garden & Gun, Dacey Orr Sivewright said that the album "combines big feelings and bold sounds" in a manner unique to Diaz. Lorusso in Pitchfork rated the album 7.3 out of 10, praising Diaz's "ear for melody" and the use of "intimacy and restraint" to provide emotional heft to the lyrics.

Some critics compared Weird Faith to Diaz's previous album, History of a Feeling. Bennett said that while "History of a Feeling was the mess of emotions, Weird Faith is the cool-headed exhale." Harbron, who rated the album 3.5 out of 5 stars, said that Weird Faith continued the story of History of a Feeling by capturing "the feeling of returning to love after a brutal loss". Lana Fleischli in Flood Magazine wrote that Diaz had grown from her last album, moving on from themes of "loneliness and heartache" to being in a new relationship. Fisette in Beats Per Minute said that the album operates from a point of "delicate uncertainty" at the start of a relationship, while its predecessor operated in "very well-worn territory". Amaya Lim in The Line of Best Fit rated the album 7 out of 10, praising Diaz's songwriting as "sharp and salient". However, she opined that its sparse production style undercut the album's emotions of joy, unlike History of a Feeling, where the sparse production style highlighted that album's dark themes.

Weird Faith reached number 33 on the UK Official Americana Albums Chart. The album was nominated for the Grammy Award for Best Folk Album and Diaz and Musgraves were nominated for the Grammy Award for Best Americana Performance for "Don't Do Me Good" at the 67th Annual Grammy Awards in 2025. Several publications listed the album on their best of 2024 lists, including Flood (36), PopMatters (41), Stereogum (41), Slate, and NPR.

== Track listing ==
Weird Faith track listing
No.	Title	Writer(s)	Length
1.	"Same Risk"	Madi Diaz; Charlie Hickey; Steph Jones	3:28
2.	"Everything Almost"	Diaz; Olivia Barton	3:00
3.	"Girlfriend"	Diaz; Konrad Snyder	3:28
4.	"Hurting You"	Diaz; Jarrad Kritzstein	3:29
5.	"Get to Know Me"	Diaz; Stephen Wilson	3:40
6.	"Kiss the Wall"	Diaz; Savana Santos; Sam Cohen	3:05
7.	"God Person"	Diaz; Michael Jade; Jordyn Shellhart	3:38
8.	"Don't Do Me Good" (with Kacey Musgraves)	Diaz; Amy Wadge	4:13
9.	"For Months Now"	Diaz; Jamie Floyd; Wrabel	4:06
10.	"KFM"	Diaz; Jade; Jenny Owen Youngs	2:55
11.	"Weird Faith"	Diaz; Lori McKenna	3:00
12.	"Obsessive Thoughts"	Diaz; Snyder	3:19
Total length:			41:21

Deluxe edition additional track listing
No.	Title	Writer(s)	Length
13.	"Worst Case Scenario"	Diaz; Shellhart; Santos	3:38
14.	"For Months Now (III)" (with Lizzy McAlpine)	Diaz; Floyd; Wrabel	4:07
15.	"One Less Question" (with Lennon Stella)	Diaz; Lennon Stella; Kate York	3:12
16.	"Human Condition (demo)" (demo track recorded by Diaz)	Diaz; Sarah Buxton; Tenille Townes	2:55
17.	"Don't Do Me Good (demo)" (demo track recorded by Diaz)	Diaz; Wadge	4:11
18.	"Get to Know Me (demo)" (demo track recorded by Diaz)	Diaz; Wilson	3:48
19.	"Same Risk (demo)" (demo track recorded by Diaz)	Diaz; Hickey; Jones	3:18
20.	"Weird Faith (demo)" (demo track recorded by Diaz)	Diaz; McKenna	2:54

== Personnel ==
- Madi Diaz – producer, vocals, guitar, bass, synth bass, synth, piano, organ, percussion, Mellotron
- Joe LaPorta – mastering
- Andrew Maury – mixing
- Konrad Snyder – producer, vocals, drums, percussion, "ambient cool shit"
- Sam Cohen – producer, drum machine
- Kacey Musgraves – featured vocals on "Don't Do Me Good"
- Nat Smith – cello, string arrangement
- Matt Barrick – drums, percussion
- Adam Schreiber – percussion
