= Introduction, Presence =

Studio album by Nation of Language
- Released: May 22, 2020
- Genres: Synth-pop; post-punk
- Length: 43:18
- Producer: Abe Seiferth

Nation of Language chronology
Reality (2018)	Introduction, Presence (2020)	A Way Forward (2021)

Singles from Introduction, Presence
- 1. "The Motorist" Released: October 10, 2019; 2. "Rush & Fever" Released: February 13, 2020; 3. "Tournament" Released: March 5, 2020; 4. "September Again" Released: March 26, 2020; 5. "Friend Machine" Released: April 16, 2020; 6. "The Wall & I" Released: May 7, 2020

Introduction, Presence is the debut studio album by American synth-pop band Nation of Language. The self-released album was scheduled for release on April 3, 2020, but was postponed to May 22, 2020 due to the COVID-19 pandemic.

== Critical reception ==
Professional ratings
Aggregate scores
Source	Rating
Album of the Year	80/100
Metacritic	81/100
Review scores
Source	Rating
NME	4/5 stars
Paste	8.8/10
Pitchfork	7.4/10
Under the Radar	7.5/10 stars
The Young Folks	8/10

Introduction, Presence was critically acclaimed by contemporary music critics upon release. On review aggregator website, Metacritic, Introduction, Presence has an average critic score of 81 out of 100, indicating "universal acclaim" based on four critics. On Album of the Year, Introduction, Presence has an average score of 80 out of 100 based on five critics.

== Track listing ==
All lyrics are written by Nation of Language; all music is composed by Ian Richard Devaney, Abe Seiferth, Michael Sue-Poi, and Fabrizio Moretti.

No.	Title	Length
1.	"Tournament"	3:58
2.	"Rush & Fever"	4:01
3.	"September Again"	3:54
4.	"On Division St"	3:14
5.	"Indignities"	5:26
6.	"Automobile"	4:30
7.	"Friend Machine"	4:27
8.	"Sacred Tongue"	3:32
9.	"The Motorist"	5:11
10.	"The Wall & I"	5:05
Total length:		43:18
