= Kisses (band) =

American band

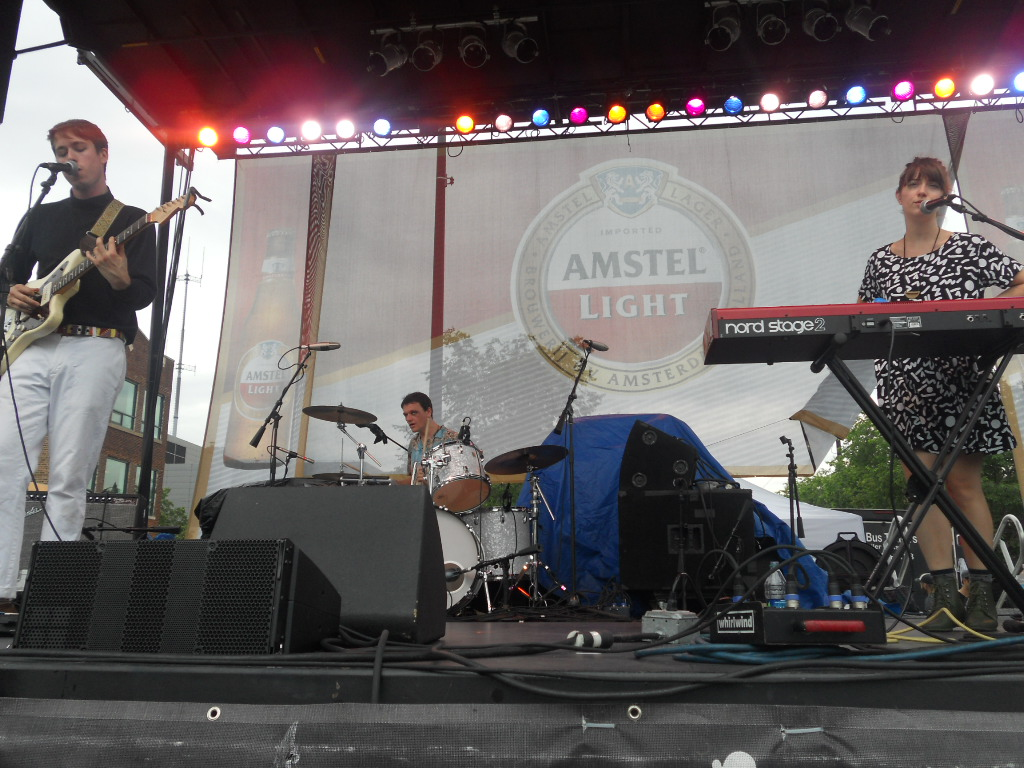
- Kisses (band) performing at the Taste of Randolph Street at Chicago, IL on June 15, 2013.

Background information
- Origin: Los Angeles, Santa Monica, California; Providence, Rhode Island
- Genres: New wave, synth-pop, pop rock, alternative rock
- Years active: 2010–present
- Labels: This is Music, Cascine
- Members: Zinzi Edmundson; Jesse Kivel

Kisses is a new wave pop rock duo from Los Angeles, California, formed in 2010. The band consists of Jesse Kivel (vocals/lead guitarist) and Zinzi Edmundson (instrumentals/keyboardist). The duo released their debut album The Heart of the Nightlife on November 8, 2010. The duo's second album, Kids in L.A., was released on May 14, 2013. In addition to Kisses, Kivel is currently a member of the indie pop band Princeton.

== Background and history ==
Jesse Kivel grew up on Princeton Street in Santa Monica, California while Zinzi Edmundson's hometown was Providence, Rhode Island. During Kivel's elementary years, he, along with his twin brother Matt and a close friend, began creating music ultimately forming the band Princeton in 2005. The following year, Kivel began dating Edmundson who is currently known for her contributions to Foam Magazine along with Bon Appétit, C magazine, EvilMonito.com and Variety.com. Eventually, although not specified, Kivel and Edmundson began composing music together and, as a result, formed the band Kisses in 2010.

Kivel's friendship with producer Alec R. Costandinos allowed for the production and release of Kisses's debut single “Bermuda” via Transparent Records in April 2010, and People Can Do the Most Amazing Things that August on IAMSOUND.” Additionally, Kisses had released other EPs including Other Planets as a download and Midnight Lover as a promo single on the label This is Music. Other Planets was later released as a limited edition cassette by Hornbuckle Records in 2013.

On November 8, 2010, Kisses released their first full-length album The Heart of the Nightlife in the United States under the music label This is Music. Kisses had previously released The Heart of the Nightlife in the United Kingdom almost a month earlier, on October 11, 2010. According to AllMusic critic Tim Sendra, the album "was inspired by Jesse Kivel's friendship with disco maestro Alec R. Costandinos and the time they spent together listening to old disco records." On May 14, 2013, Kisses released their second full-length album Kids in L.A. via the Cascine label in the U.S.; it was compared to New Order, OMD, and Afrika Bambaataa. Both full-length albums were also released in Japan on the label Rallye Records. The Heart of the Nightlife was released in Japan in 2010 and Kids in L.A. was released on April 17, 2013.

Kisses was ranked #40 in NME's 50 Best Bands of 2010. Since the release of their debut album, Kisses have become recognized by several professional publications including Pitchfork AllMusic and Metacritic with generally positive reviews.

== Discography ==
- The Heart of the Nightlife (2010)
- Kids in L.A. (2013)
- Other Planets (2013)
- Rest In Paradise (2015)
