= Madi Diaz =

American singer-songwriter (born 1986)

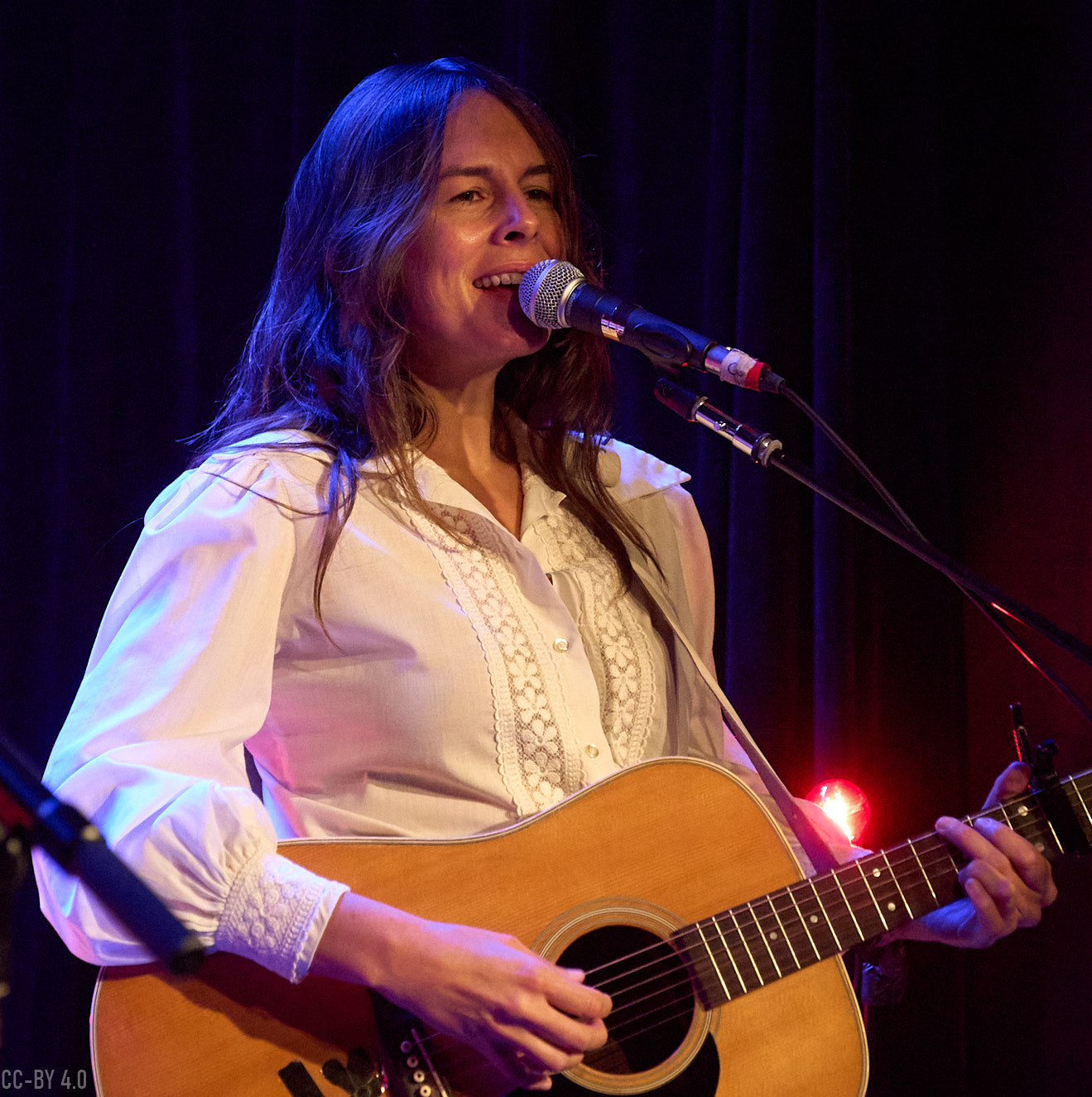
- Diaz performing in 2022

Background information
- Born: May 14, 1986 (age 40); Greenwich, Connecticut, U.S.
- Origin: Los Angeles, California, U.S.
- Genres: Pop, folk, electronic, rock
- Occupation: Musician
- Years active: 2007–present
- Label: Anti-
- Website: madidiaz.com

Madi Diaz (born May 14, 1986) is an American singer-songwriter and musician who has been nominated twice for Grammy Awards, for Best Folk Album and Best Americana Performance.

== Early life ==
Diaz grew up in Lancaster County, Pennsylvania, where she was home-schooled by her Peruvian mother, Nancy, a proponent of early childhood development and the visual arts, and her Danish father, Eric, a woodworker and musician. Diaz began piano lessons at age five from her father.

In her early teens, Diaz switched from piano to guitar. She was featured in Rock School, director Don Argott's 2005 documentary about the School of Rock, as Madi Diaz-Svalgard. Her father Eric Svalgård is a member of the Frank Zappa tribute band Project/Object.

== Music career ==
After high school, Diaz was accepted to Berklee College of Music. At Berklee, she began working with Kyle Ryan, the Nebraska-raised guitarist who would be her songwriting collaborator for her early career. The two began their collaboration when a fellow student, a producer looking for a project, offered Diaz the chance to record an album in Hawaii. The self-released album Skin and Bone (2007) was the result, and a songwriting and performing partnership between Diaz and Ryan stuck. Shortly after, Diaz dropped out of the program at Berklee.

In 2008, Diaz and Ryan continued writing and began playing shows in New York City. There, she met her manager and signed to publisher Cherry Lane Music. Diaz and Ryan were then sent to Nashville for a month to write, and in mid-2010 moved to Nashville.

After releasing the EP, Ten Gun Salute, Diaz began touring with The Civil Wars and Landon Pigg. She was featured in Paste magazine as one of the "Top Ten Buzziest Acts" at SXSW 2009, and had songs featured on cw The originals ABC Family's Pretty Little Liars, and Lifetime's Drop Dead Diva, Army Wives, and Princesses: Long Island.

Her EP, Far from the Things That We Know, was released on September 20, 2011, by TinyOGRE Entertainment. The EP was recorded in Los Angeles and Charlottesville, VA with John Alagia (Dave Matthews Band, John Mayer) serving as producer. The EP previewed songs from her full-length album, Plastic Moon, which was released in January 2012.

In February 2012, Diaz moved to Los Angeles, marking a new chapter in her music career. Now working solo, her next album, We Threw Our Hearts in the Fire, was released on October 23, 2012.

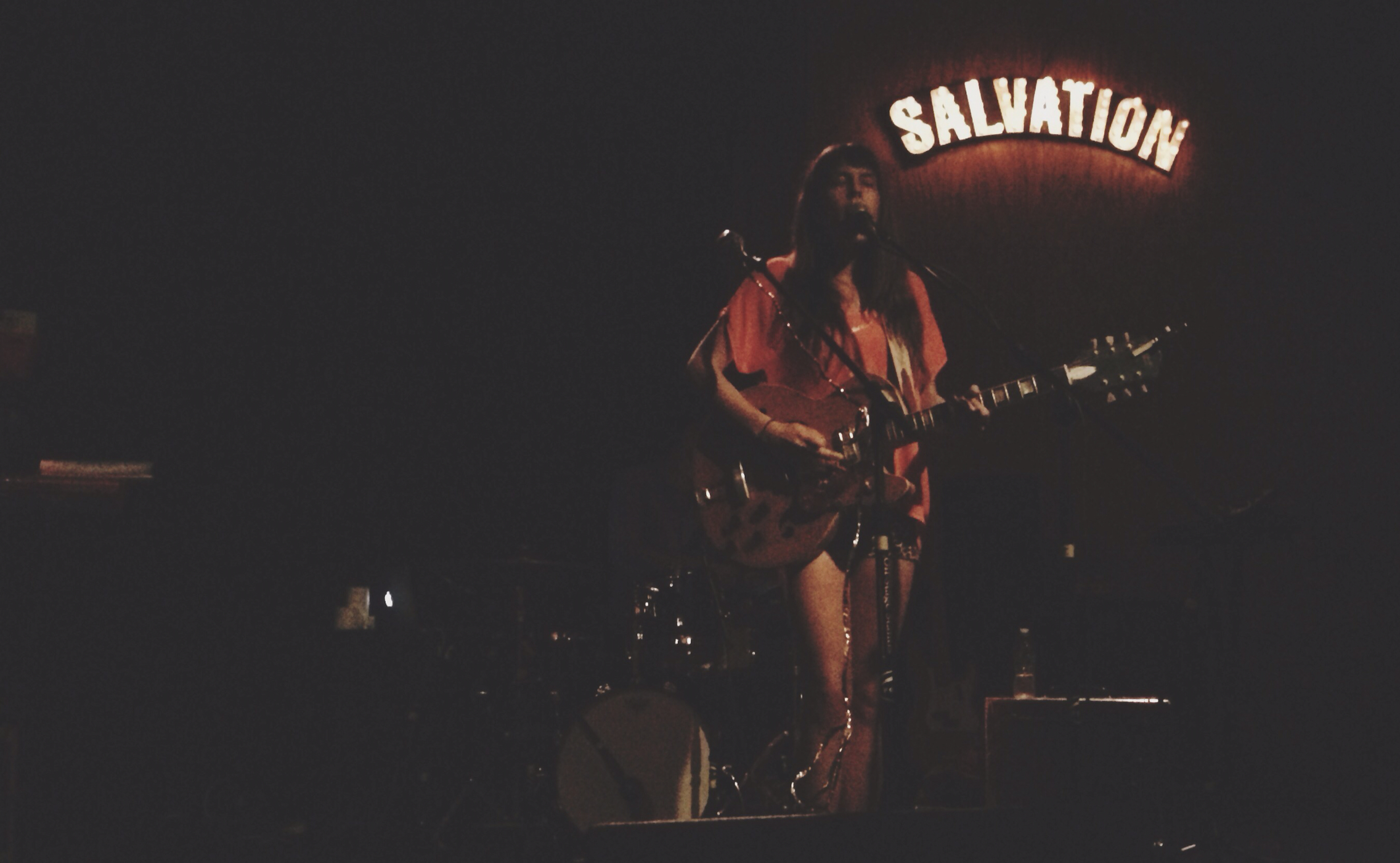
Diaz performing at Silverlake Lounge in 2014

Diaz appeared as a guest on Last Call with Carson Daly on the January 13, 2014, episode. She released the single "Stay Together" on July 11, 2014. It is the first single off of her album, Phantom, which was released in September 2014.

The song "The End of the Day", written by Diaz and Sarah Siskind, was featured on the television series Nashville, and is performed by Connie Britton and Charles Esten.

In 2018, Diaz provided the vocals for Dan Romer's track, "Help Me Faith", from the soundtrack of the videogame, Far Cry 5.

On February 11, 2021, Anti- Records announced that Diaz had signed with them, alongside the release of her first single with the label titled "Man in Me". Diaz released History of a Feeling on August 27, 2021. Diaz appeared on National Public Radio's Tiny Desk concert series on March 28, 2022, singing songs from her living room off her History of a Feeling album. She was accompanied by Annaliese Kowert, Lydia Luce, Adam Popick, Kaitlyn Raitz, and Kristin Weber.

In early 2023, Madi Diaz joined Harry Styles's band playing guitar and singing backup vocals for the European leg of Love On Tour.

Diaz's album, Weird Faith, was released on February 9, 2024. It was nominated for a Grammy Award for Best Folk Album and the song "Don't Do Me Good", which featured Kacey Musgraves, was nominated for a Grammy for Best Americana Performance. In Spring 2024, Diaz supported her friend Kacey Musgraves on the UK and European legs of her Deeper Well World Tour, and later that year opened for Stephen Sanchez during his show at the Minnesota State Fair.

Diaz released the first single, "Feel Something", from her upcoming album Fatal Optimist on July 21, 2025. Anti- released single "Ambivalence" on August 18 and single "Heavy Metal" on September 15. Fatal Optimist, produced by Diaz with Gabe Wax, was released on October 10, 2025. Diaz described the album as "the innate hope for something magical. It’s the weird faith that kicks in while knowing that there is just plain risk that comes with wanting someone or something. It’s when you have no control over the outcome, but still choose to experience every moment that happens, and put your whole heart in it.” Diaz started touring in support of the album on October 11, 2025. Diaz released a cover album of Blink-182's Enema of the State, titled Enema of the Garden State, in November 2025, with all proceeds donated to the Defending our Neighbors Fund, an immigration legal aid charity.

In 2026, Diaz along with Brian Fallon recorded a cover of The Shirelles song "Will You Still Love Me Tomorrow" for the soundtrack to the film Ready or Not 2: Here I Come.

== Discography ==
Studio albums

- Skin and Bone (April 11, 2007)
- Plastic Moon (January 24, 2012) – No. 20 on Billboard Heatseekers Album Chart
- We Threw Our Hearts in the Fire (October 23, 2012)
- Phantom (September 30, 2014)
- History of a Feeling (August 27, 2021)
- Weird Faith (February 9, 2024)
- Fatal Optimist (October 10, 2025)

EPs

- Ten Gun Salute (December 5, 2008)
- Far from the Things That We Know (September 20, 2011)
- It's Okay to Be Alone (August 2, 2018)
- Same History, New Feelings (March 4, 2022)

Other

- Ready or Not 2: Here I Come (March 20, 2026) (with Brian Fallon covering "Will You Still Love Me Tomorrow")
