= Violent Light =

Studio album by Milagres
- Released: February 24, 2014
- Genres: indie rock, industrial rock, new wave
- Length: 38:07
- Labels: Kill Rock Stars, Memphis Industries
- Producer: Fraser McCulloch

Milagres chronology
Glowing Mouth (2011)	Violent Light (2014)	Ziggurat (2018)

Professional ratings
Aggregate scores
Source	Rating
Metacritic	68/100
Review scores
Source	Rating
AllMusic	4/5 stars
Drowned in Sound	6/10

Violent Light is the third studio album by Milagres. It was released through Kill Rock Stars (US) and Memphis Industries (Europe) on February 24, 2014.

== Track listing ==
All tracks are written by Kyle Wilson.

No.	Title	Length
1.	"Perennial Bulb"	4:20
2.	"Terrifying Sea"	3:38
3.	"Jeweled Cave"	3:12
4.	"The Black Table"	3:34
5.	"Column of Streetlight"	4:25
6.	"The Letterbomb"	3:28
7.	"Urban Eunuchs"	3:48
8.	"Idnyl"	3:19
9.	"Sunburn"	3:57
10.	"Another Light"	4:26
