= Lewis Del Mar =

American musical duo

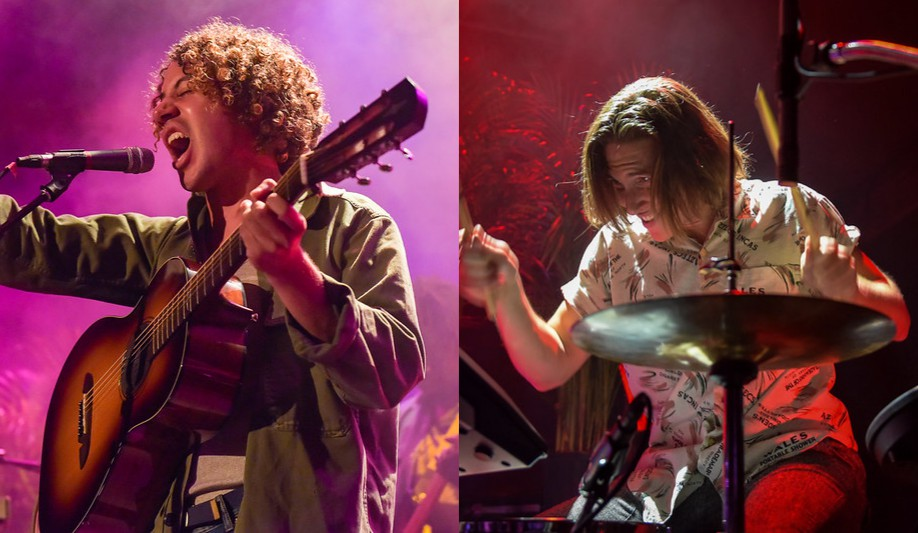
- Lewis Del Mar in 2016. From left to right: Danny Miller, Max Harwood.

Background information
- Origin: New York City, U.S.
- Genres: Experimental pop; rock
- Years active: 2015–present
- Labels: Startime International; Columbia; Fader Label
- Members: Danny Miller
- Past members: Jacob Luten; Max Harwood
- Website: lewisdelmar.com

Lewis Del Mar is an American experimental pop duo from Rockaway Beach, Queens, New York City. Consisting of singer and guitarist Danny Miller, and drummer and producer Max Harwood, the group first received attention in early 2015 when their debut single "Loud(y)" was featured in the number one spot on Hype Machine. They released their debut extended play, EP, in January 2016, which peaked at number 7 on Billboard Emerging Artists. Their self-titled debut album was released on October 7, 2016, through Columbia Records.

== Career ==
=== Lewis Del Mar (2016–2020) ===
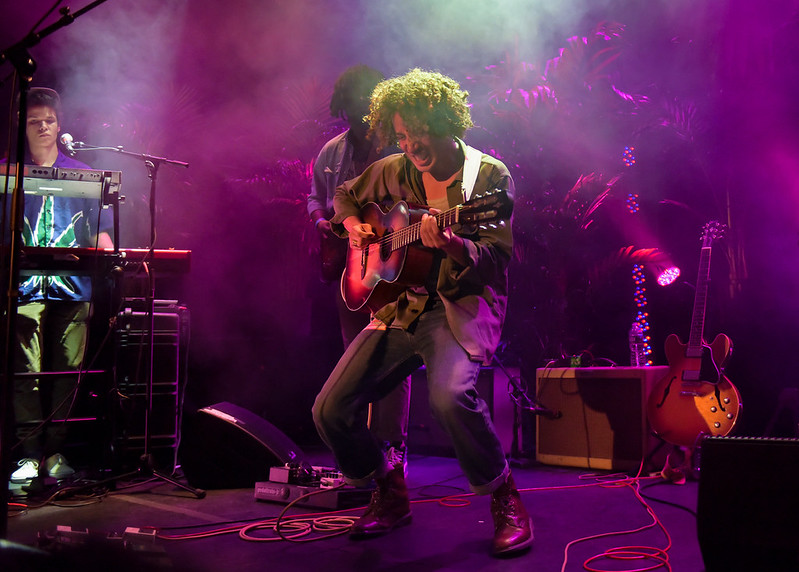
Danny Miller performing with Lewis Del Mar at the Bowery Ballroom in New York City, 2016.

The group's self titled debut album Lewis Del Mar received support from NPR, Vice, and The New York Times, and led to late night performances on The Late Late Show with James Corden and Conan. Rolling Stone called the lead single "Loud(y)" "A beachside dreamscape with acoustic guitars and electronic drums washing up on shore", while Los Angeles radio station KCRW said it was "one of the best tunes to come out [in 2016]. The album also led to an international headlining tour from 2016–2017, including stops at globally renowned festivals such as Austin City Limits, Outside Lands, and Lollapalooza.

=== August (2020–present) ===
In May 2020, the group announced that their second album August would be released on August 21, 2020. The album's lead single, "The Ceiling" was premiered by Zane Lowe as a Beats 1 Radio "Worlds First", and received support from Annie Mac on BBC Radio 1's "Future Sounds". Culture Collide called the single "a triumphant return", and TIME named it one of the best songs of May 2020. "The Ceiling" was followed by singles "Border (CH. III)" and "Rosalie (CH. II)", the latter of which Dujour referred to as "a declaration of the importance of human connections and relationships."

== Discography ==
=== Studio albums ===
Title	Details	Peak chart positions
Title	Details	US Heat
Lewis Del Mar	Released: October 7, 2016; Label: Columbia	19
August	Released: August 21, 2020; Label: Fader	—

=== EPs ===
Title	Details
EP	Released: January 15, 2016; Label: Columbia

=== Singles ===
Title	Year	Peak chart positions		Album
Title	Year	US Alt.	US Rock Air	Album
"Loud(y)"	2015	22	29	Lewis Del Mar
"Malt Liquor"	2016	36	—	Lewis Del Mar
"Painting (Masterpiece)"	2016	—	—	Lewis Del Mar
"14 Faces"	2016	—	—	Lewis Del Mar
"Puerto Cabezas, NI"	2016	—	—	Lewis Del Mar
"The Ceiling / Border (CH. III)"	2020	—	—	August
"Rosalie (CH. II)"	2020	—	—	August
"Do You Need Me"	2020	—	—	August
"TV"	2020	—	—	August
