= Lewis Del Mar (album) =

Studio album by Lewis Del Mar
- Released: October 7, 2016
- Genre: Folk rock
- Label: Columbia

Lewis Del Mar chronology
Lewis Del Mar (2016)	August (2020)

Singles from Lewis Del Mar
- 1. "Loud(y)" Released: January 1, 2015; 2. "Malt Liquor" Released: January 15, 2016; 3. "Painting (Masterpiece)" Released: July 22, 2016; 4. "14 Faces" Released: July 22, 2016; 5. "Puerto Cabezas, NI" Released: September 30, 2016

Professional ratings
Review scores
Source	Rating
AllMusic	3.5/5 stars

Lewis Del Mar is the self-titled debut album by American folk pop duo Lewis Del Mar. It was released by Columbia Records on October 7, 2016 on CD, digital download and 12″ vinyl.

== Background ==
Lewis Del Mar is described by singer Danny Miller as "urban electro latinfolk", while drummer Max Harwood says, "We always try to maintain a balance between more industrial sounds and acoustic sounds." The songwriting for the album was completed by fall of 2015, when Harwood and Miller took a trip to Colombia. Having roots in Latin America, due to Miller's father being from Nicaragua, and Harwood's parents residing in Panama, they took their inspiration from Latin music.

== Critical reception ==
Marcy Donelson of AllMusic says, "Lewis Del Mar have a knack for controlled hooks and anthems, but their greatest strength is in the artful balance of their contributors: drummer/producer Harwood brings as much to the sound as singer/guitarist Miller, and every note and timbre is valued in their pop sculptures."

Haydon Benfield of Renowned for Sound says the album is "such a summer romance of an album, easy to love intensely for a short period of time, but not a long-term prospect." He then states that the duo "ably demonstrate their chops with this debut album, now they just need to build their distinctive sound into something more substantial."

Reviewing the album for The Indiependent, Jasmin Robinson says, "The trinity of acoustic guitar, exhilaratingly reviving drums, and protruding synths become Lewis Del Mar's idiosyncratic sound on this innovative and spectacular debut album, and is one that sets this experimental LP aside from a wealth of others."

== Track listing ==
No.	Title	Length
1.	"Such Small Scenes"	2:18
2.	"Loud(y)"	4:09
3.	"14 Faces"	3:37
4.	"Painting (Masterpiece)"	4:03
5.	"Puerto Cabezas, NI"	4:33
6.	"Tap Water Drinking"	4:14
7.	"Malt Liquor"	4:21
8.	"H.D.L."	3:57
9.	"Islands"	3:40
10.	"Live That Long"	4:45

== Personnel ==
- Max Harwood — composer, engineer, instrumentation, producer
- Daniel Miller — composer, engineer, instrumentation, producer
- Mike Deutsch — marimba
- Drew Hart — bass
- Steve Marion — electric guitar
- Andrew Maury — electric guitar, engineer, mixing, producer
- Tersoo Achineku — songwriter
- Joe LaPorta — mastering
- Maria P. Marulanda — package design
- Daniel Topete — photography

== Charts ==
Chart performance for Lewis Del Mar
Chart (2016)	Peak position
US Alternative Airplay (Billboard)	19
