= If You're Young =

Studio album by The Static Jacks
- Released: August 30, 2011
- Recorded: Spring 2011
- Studio: Stratosphere Sound
- Genre: Punk rock; indie rock
- Length: 37:08
- Label: Fearless Records
- Producer: Chris Shaw

The Static Jacks chronology
| Laces (2009) | If You're Young (2011) | Spray Tan (2012) |

Professional ratings
Review scores
| Source | Rating |
|---|---|
| AllMusic | 3/5 stars |
| NME | 4/10 stars |
| idobi Network | 3/5 stars |
| musicOMH | 2.5/5 stars |
| Female First | 4/5 stars |
| Blurt | 8/10 stars |
| Alternative Press | 80/100 |

If You're Young is the first LP released by the Static Jacks. Produced and engineered by Chris Shaw, the album was released on August 30, 2011 in the United States of America and on March 5, 2012 in the United Kingdom, both with Fearless Records.

When asked "Is there a theme to If You're Young?" in an interview by Filter, lead singer Ian Devaney states, "There are definitely running themes. I'd say the overarching one is the frustration that comes with the transition period in your late teens and early 20s. It's a tough time in your life to try and hold on to the relationships you've had for so many years."

The double single of "Into the Sun" and "Mercy, Hallelujah" was released on July 26, 2011 with iTunes.

On September 29, 2011, Rolling Stone debuted Remix Artist Collective's Maury Mix of "Into the Sun".

The video for "Into the Sun" was released on YouTube under TheStaticJacks account in November 2011. It clocks at 3:35.

"Mercy, Hallelujah" was named the #5 song of 2011 by Newsday.

== Track listing ==
| No. | Title | Length |
|---|---|---|
| 1. | "Defend Rosie" | 3:08 |
| 2. | "Girl Parts" | 2:22 |
| 3. | "Into the Sun" | 3:13 |
| 4. | "My Parents Lied" | 2:51 |
| 5. | "Sonata (Maybe We Can Work It Out)" | 3:04 |
| 6. | "Walls (We Can't Work It Out)" | 2:22 |
| 7. | "Mercy, Hallelujah" | 3:11 |
| 8. | "Blood Pressure" | 3:22 |
| 9. | "This Is Me Dancing" | 3:46 |
| 10. | "Relief" | 3:56 |
| 11. | "It's Such a Shame" | 3:27 |
| 12. | "Drano Ears" | 3:10 |
| Total length: | | 37:52 |

iTunes Bonus Track
| No. | Title | Length |
|---|---|---|
| 13. | "Ink" | 3:22 |

== Release history ==
| Country | Release date |
|---|---|
| United States | August 30, 2011 |
| United Kingdom | March 5, 2012 |
