= Devon Cole =

Canadian singer-songwriter from Calgary, Alberta (born 1998)

- Born: April 1, 1998 (age 28); Calgary, Alberta, Canada
- Genre: Alternative pop
- Occupations: Singer, songwriter
- Years active: 2020–present
- Label: Arista

Devon Cole (born April 1, 1998) is a Canadian singer-songwriter from Calgary, Alberta. She is mostly known for her single, "W.I.T.C.H.", of which the demo went viral on TikTok.

Cole received a 2023 Juno nomination for Breakthrough Artist of the Year. She was also nominated for Favorite Breakout Artist for the 2023 Nickelodeon Kids' Choice Awards, and earned a win as Amazon Music's Breakthrough Canada Artist of 2023.

On July 5, 2025, Cole was the sole opener for performer Shania Twain at the Scotiabank Saddledome during the Calgary Stampede; Cole's performance received critical acclaim.

== Discography ==
=== Extended plays ===
List of EPs, showing release date, label and formats
Title	Details
Party for One	Released: November 17, 2021; Label: Independent; Formats: Digital download, streaming
1-800-Got-Stress	Released: June 2, 2023; Label: Arista; Formats: Digital download, streaming
Two Shades Blonder	Released: October 25, 2024; Label: Arista; Formats: Digital download, streaming

=== Singles ===
List of singles, with selected chart positions and certifications, showing year released and album name
Title	Year	Peak chart positions	Certifications	Album/EP
Title	Year	CAN	Certifications	Album/EP
"July for the Whole Year"	2020	—		Non-album single
"Alive"	2021	—		Party for One
"Good on Me"	2021	—		Party for One
"High & Dry"	2021	—		Party for One
"Nobody's Baby"	2021	—		Party for One
"Uncall It"	2022	—		Non-album single
"W.I.T.C.H."	2022	—	MC: Platinum	1-800-Got-Stress
"Hey Cowboy"	2022	—		1-800-Got-Stress
"Call U After Rehab"	2023	—		1-800-Got-Stress
"1-800-Got-Stress"	2023	—		1-800-Got-Stress
"Dickhead"	2023	—		Non-album single
"I Got You"	2024	55	MC: Gold	Two Shades Blonder
"Good Guy"	2024	—		Two Shades Blonder
"Sugar Daddy"	2024	—		Two Shades Blonder
"Play House"	2025	—		Non-album singles
"Sorry Mom"	2025	—		Non-album singles
"Serial Kisser"	2026	87		Non-album singles
"—" denotes a recording that did not chart.
