= Avenue Beat =

American girl group

- Origin: Quincy, Illinois
- Genres: Country; pop
- Years active: 2019–2021
- Label: Valory (BMLG)/Tape Room
- Past members: Sami Bearden; Savana Santos; Sam Backoff

Avenue Beat was an American girl group from Quincy, Illinois, composed of members Sami Bearden, Savana Santos and Sam Backoff. Backoff and Santos were friends growing up and met Bearden at a theater camp in high school. On October 15, 2021, Avenue Beat disbanded following the release of their first and final album, The Debut Farewell Album, with Santos and Backoff citing that they wanted to support their friend and did not want to continue the band without Bearden.

== Career ==
Avenue Beat debuted with their self-titled EP released on July 26, 2019, with "Ruin That for Me" acting as the lead single. The EP was co-produced by lead singer Savana Santos, producer and songwriter David Garcia, and songwriter Ashley Gorley. "I Don't Really Like Your Boyfriend" was released on May 22, 2020. Avenue Beat's TikTok video "Lowkey Fuck 2020" went viral on the platform, reaching over 11 million views, prompting the band to make an entire song with new verses, which they would later release as a single titled "F2020." The song was released on July 10, 2020.

The band released The Debut Farewell Album, their first and only album, on October 15, 2021. The album follows the band's journey as musical artists, beginning with their rise to popularity with "F2020," followed by their other two singles and a collection of songs they had written during their time as a band. After an interlude explaining that Sami had quit the band, the album concludes with three songs describing Savana Santos and Sam Backoff's feelings of ending the band. The last of these three songs, "This is Goodbye," was released three weeks prior to the album's release on September 24 to align with the group's announcement that they were disbanding. In an interview with MusicRow on the same day, Santos elaborated on the band's decision to end, stating "Sami decided this life wasn't for her. She didn't like what it was, and it was time for her to stop. So it was time for this to stop. We didn't really see it coming, but we wanted to support our friend."

Since their split, Savana Santos has begun a solo music career and released her debut album 1 on October 27, 2023. Sam Backoff shifted her focus to songwriting, and signed a publishing deal to write with Warner Chappell Music Group.

In October 2026, Avenue Beat dropped a surprise album announcing their reunion, released independently.

== Discography ==
=== Albums ===
- SOULMATES (October 9, 2026)
- The Debut Farewell Album (October 15, 2021)

=== Extended plays ===
- Avenue Beat (July 26, 2019)
- The Quarantine Covers (April 24, 2020)

=== Singles ===
- "Delight" (July 26, 2019)
- "Ruin That for Me" (October 23, 2019)
- "Thank You Anxiety" (April 10, 2020)
- "I Don't Really Like Your Boyfriend" (May 22, 2020)
- "F2020" (July 10, 2020)
- "Woman" (January 15, 2021)
- "This Is Goodbye" (September 24, 2021)
