= W.I.T.C.H. (song) =

2022 single by Devon Cole

Single by Devon Cole

from the EP 1-800-Got-Stress
- Released: July 7, 2022
- Label: Arista
- Songwriters: John Mark Nelson; Devon Cole; Alexandra Soumalias
- Producer: John Mark Nelson

Devon Cole singles chronology
"Uncall It" (2022)	"W.I.T.C.H." (2022)	"Hey Cowboy" (2022)

"W.I.T.C.H." (pronounced "witch") is a 2022 song by Canadian alt-pop singer Devon Cole. It was released on July 7, 2022, via Arista Records. The song was written by Cole and songwriters John Mark Nelson and Alexandra Soumalias.

== Background ==
Cole initially performed a demo of the opening verse of the song on TikTok, where it received over 40 million views. She was singing original lyrics over a piece of instrumental backing music Nelson had shared on the platform.

A full version of the song was then released as her first single through Arista Records (who are owned by Sony Music Entertainment) on 7 July 2022. With nearly 300,000 pre-saves, it was Sony's biggest pre-save campaign for a female artist to that point. A music video followed.

"W.I.T.C.H." is an acronym for "Woman In Total Control (of) Herself". Cole described the song as reclaiming "the witch as a symbol of women's resistance. It celebrates women's strength, autonomy, and rebellion". The song was written by Nelson, Cole and Alexandra Soumalias, and produced by Nelson. The music was performed by Nelson on keyboards, guitar, bass and drum machine.

Cole received a Juno Award nomination for Breakthrough Artist of the Year at the Juno Awards of 2023.

== Certifications ==
Certifications for "W.I.T.C.H."
Region	Certification	Certified units/sales
Canada (Music Canada)	Platinum	80,000^{‡}
^{‡} Sales+streaming figures based on certification alone.
