= Milagres (band) =

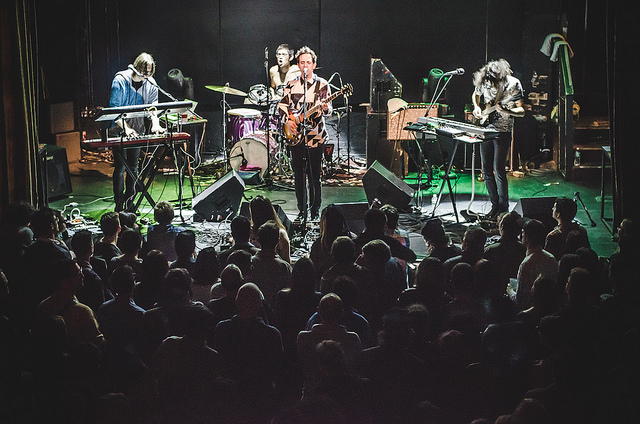
- Milagres performing at Bowery Ballroom, NYC in 2014

Background information
- Origin: Brooklyn, New York, United States
- Genres: indie rock, indie pop, alternative rock, synthpop
- Years active: 2006–present
- Labels: Kill Rock Stars (US), Memphis Industries (UK/EU)
- Members: Kyle Wilson; Fraser McCulloch
- Past members: Eric Schwortz; Steve Leventhal; Paul Payabyab; Chris Brazee
- Website: www.milagresmusic.com

Milagres is an American indie rock band from Brooklyn, NY. The band was founded in 2006 under a different name and lineup, and independently released an album, Seven Summits, in 2008. After some lineup changes and regional touring, the band changed its name to Milagres and began writing and recording what would later become their second record. The band signed to the music label Kill Rock Stars in Spring of 2011, and released their national debut, Glowing Mouth, in September 2011. Milagres embarked on several national tours of the US, UK and Europe in support of Glowing Mouth. Kill Rock Stars released the band's follow-up, Violent Light, in 2014. The band toured the US in support of the album and played a headlining release show at Bowery Ballroom. After a short hiatus and a long writing and recording process, Milagres self-released their fourth album, ZIGGURAT in 2018 as a duo.

== Formation ==
Kyle Wilson (lead vocals, guitar), Fraser McCulloch (bass, keys, backing vocals), and Eric Schwortz (guitar, backing vocals, percussion) met while attending New York University. Drummer Steven Leventhal had played in bands with Schwortz since high school. Keyboardist Chris Brazee knew McCulloch from high school, where they were in a band together. The band was on shaky ground when Wilson went on a mountain climbing expedition in 2010: he sustained a fall and back injury, and wrote many of the songs that would become a part of Glowing Mouth while bedridden. Upon hearing the album, music label Kill Rock Stars signed the band without even seeing them.

Shortly after their release in September 2011, the band signed with U.K. based label Memphis Industries to release the album in the UK and EU territories. The band received national and international attention from Spin Magazine, National Public Radio, The Guardian, KEXP, and KCRW (amongst others). The band has also placed in the CMJ music charts and a significant number of Milagres songs have been played on several notable radio stations (such as BBC, KEXP, KCRW, The Current, and World Cafe Live).

In Spring of 2012, Paul Payabyab replaced original drummer Steve Leventhal.

== Live Performances ==
- In Fall of 2010 the band played at CMJ Music Festival
- The band performed at South by Southwest Music Festival in 2011 and 2012
- In Fall of 2011 the band went on a National Tour with Peter Wolf Crier and went on to the West Coast as a headlining act
- In Spring of 2012 the band went on a National Headlining Tour in the US and UK
- The band has performed at Primavera Sound, Bestival, Electric Picnic, and other festivals

== Discography ==
- Seven Summits (2008, Self Released)
- Glowing Mouth (2011, Kill Rock Stars (US), Memphis Industries (UK/EU))
- Violent Light (2014, Kill Rock Stars (US), Memphis Industries(UK/EU))
- Ziggurat (2018, Self Released)
