= History of a Feeling =

Studio album by Madi Diaz
- Released: August 27, 2021
- Genre: Indie rock
- Length: 38:15
- Label: Anti-
- Producer: Madi Diaz; Andrew Sarlo

Madi Diaz studio album chronology
Phantom (2014)	History of a Feeling (2021)	Weird Faith (2024)

History of a Feeling is the fifth studio album by American singer-songwriter Madi Diaz, released on August 27, 2021, through Anti-. Diaz co-produced the album with Andrew Sarlo, which follows seven years after her previous studio album, Phantom (2014). It received positive reviews from critics.

== Background ==
Diaz began writing the album in 2018 after a break-up.

== Critical reception ==
Professional ratings
Aggregate scores
Source	Rating
Metacritic	80/100
Review scores
Source	Rating
AllMusic	3.5/5 stars
Mojo	4/5 stars
Pitchfork	7.5/10
Uncut	8/10
Under the Radar	7.5/10

History of a Feeling received a score of 80 out of 100 on review aggregator Metacritic based on five critics' reviews, indicating "generally favorable" reception. Mojo called it "gorgeous and achingly candid", while Uncut felt that "Diaz deftly carries the torch, fusing stripped-down, bleeding-heart acoustic meditations with bursts of fiery instrumentation, her glossy voice at once tender and insistent, rhythmically narrating her loveworn journey with precise, clever turns of phrase". Marcy Donelson of AllMusic characterized it as a "notably personal and forthright set of songs" that concern "a painful breakup, issues of identity surrounding the transitioning of her former partner, and even the centering of the events, which tended to relegate Diaz to a bystander role".

Reviewing the album for Pitchfork, Shaad D'Souza described it as "a spare, unvarnished, and occasionally volatile style of indie rock that feels in step with the newly sharpened edge to her lyricism", with D'Souza writing that each song is "driven by a strong, indelible vocal melody memorable and polished enough to sit on a far more commercial record". Under the Radar's Caleb Campbell found it to be "unrepentantly dramatic and gorgeously messy" and "a concerted exorcism of all of Diaz's rage, resentment, and sadness".

== Track listing ==
History of a Feeling track listing
No.	Title	Writer(s)	Length
1.	"Rage"	Madi Diaz; Konrad Snyder; Bobbie Allen	1:49
2.	"Man in Me"	Diaz; Rayland Baxter; Steph Jones	4:48
3.	"Crying in Public"	Diaz; Jamie Floyd; Stephen Wrabel	4:00
4.	"Resentment"	Diaz; Floyd; Wrabel	2:53
5.	"Think of Me"	Diaz; Snyder; Kelsey Byrne	3:30
6.	"Woman in My Heart"	Diaz; Sean Van Vleet	2:59
7.	"Nervous"	Diaz; Jarrad Kritzstein	2:46
8.	"Forever"	Diaz; Morgan Nagler	4:38
9.	"History of a Feeling"	Diaz; Natalie Hemby	3:19
10.	"New Person, Old Place"	Diaz; Floyd; Emily West	4:06
11.	"Do It Now"	Diaz; Kritzstein	3:27
Total length:			38:15

== Charts ==
Chart performance for History of a Feeling
Chart (2021)	Peak position
UK Americana Albums (OCC)	32
