= Jeremy Messersmith =

American indie pop musician

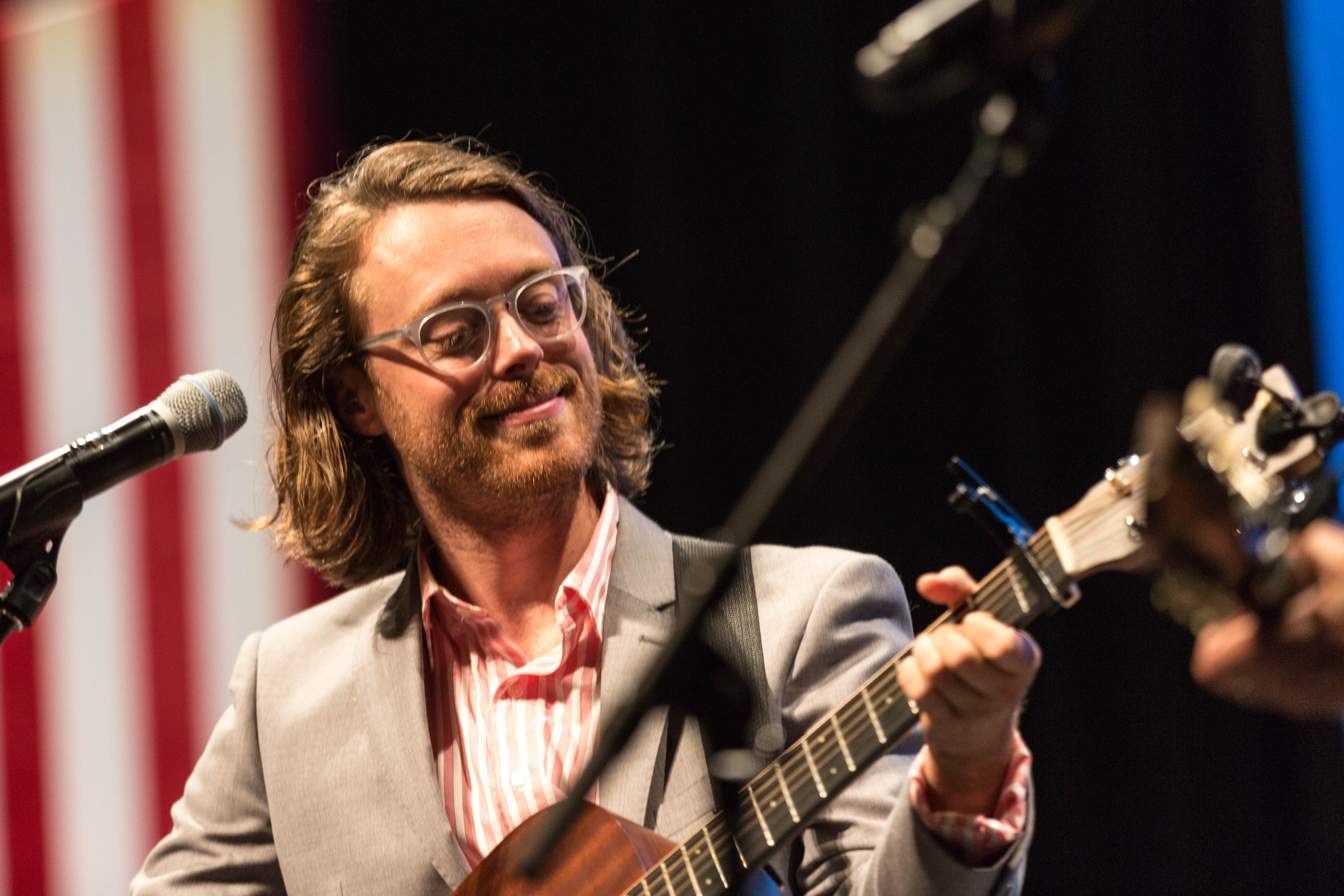
- Messersmith in 2016

Background information
- Born: Charleston, South Carolina, United States
- Origin: Minneapolis, Minnesota, United States
- Genres: Indie rock; indie pop; folk
- Occupation: Singer-songwriter
- Instruments: Vocals; guitar
- Years active: 2006–present
- Label: Glassnote Records
- Website: jeremymessersmith.com

Jeremy Matthew Messersmith is an American indie pop musician based in Minneapolis, Minnesota, United States. Messersmith's Reluctant Graveyard was named one of the Top 10 Albums of 2010 by NPR. His video for the Star Wars-themed "Tatooine" went viral, with Messersmith receiving national press in several publications. Messersmith has also opened for President Barack Obama and Vice President Joe Biden on occasion.

== Biography ==
Jeremy Messersmith was born in Charleston, South Carolina, United States, and grew up in the Tri-Cities area of Washington. He began playing music in church at a young age, and counts Sandi Patti, Carman, DC Talk and Michael W. Smith among his earliest musical influences.

He initially played the trumpet, but was forced to stop after having dental braces installed; he then switched to guitar.

In 1999, he moved to Minneapolis to study music at North Central University.

== Music career ==
=== The Alcatraz Kid ===
After his first album, The Alcatraz Kid, was released in 2006, City Pages called Messersmith the "premier under-30 songwriter in the Twin Cities". The Alcatraz Kid also received the attention of Performing Songwriter, KCRW, and The Current. The album's title was inspired by a man who used the name to prank-call Messersmith's workplace.

=== The Silver City ===
Messersmith's second album, The Silver City, was produced by Dan Wilson and features an array of pop songs ranging from the electronically inspired "Miracles" to love songs like "Love You To Pieces".

The Silver City was recognized in a press poll as the second-best album in the Twin Cities in 2008, losing to the then up-and-coming hip-hop act Atmosphere. Messersmith has been featured on NPR, NPR's "Car Talk", Paste magazine, iTunes, The New York Times, New York magazine, The Wall Street Journal, Wired magazine, BoingBoing, USA Today, My Old Kentucky Blog, Yahoo Landing Page, World Cafe Live on WXPN, Independent Film Channel, MTV's "The Real World", NBC's "Chuck", ABC's "Ugly Betty", CBS's "2 Broke Girls", and Showtime's "The United States of Tara". His songs have appeared in a French film and a Norwegian commercial.

=== Reluctant Graveyard ===
Messersmith's Reluctant Graveyard was named one of the Top 10 Albums of 2010 by NPR, Top 25 Videos of 2010 by Paste magazine, and also won the Star Tribune's Critics' Poll for Best Local Artist. His video for the Star Wars-themed "Tatooine" went viral, with Messersmith receiving national press in several publications.

=== Appearances ===
Messersmith has opened for President Barack Obama and Vice President Joe Biden on separate occasions.

In the fall of 2012, Messersmith embarked on a "Supper Club Tour" in which he combined Pot Luck Dinners with Living Room Shows, selling out shows across the country. In 2013, he signed with Glassnote Records for his forthcoming release, Heart Murmurs, which was released in February 2014. He also toured extensively, playing with Tom O'Dell, Daughter, BOY, and Brett Dennen. The lead track from the album, "Tourniquet", was featured on The Current, WXPN, NPR's Here & Now, and Time magazine, where Messersmith was named one of 14 artists to look out for in 2014.

In 2014, Messersmith appeared on the radio variety show Wits alongside comedian Maria Bamford and host John Moe at the College of St. Benedict in St. Joseph, Minnesota.

=== 11 Obscenely Optimistic Songs For Ukulele ===
In 2017, he released a digital-only songbook, 11 Obscenely Optimistic Songs For Ukulele: A Micro-Folk Record For The 21st Century And Beyond, which could be downloaded for free from his website. Of the release of his own versions of the songs, he wrote, "The audio will be released in mid April. I just wanted people to experience the songs with their own voices first."

=== Purple Hearts ===
In early 2018, Messersmith released "Purple Hearts", the first single from his fifth full-length studio album, Late Stage Capitalism. In a press release, he elaborated on the song's narrative, calling it "two people on opposite sides of a cultural divide, who are experiencing the loneliness and disconnection of modern society in the form of the worst first date of all time. For a pop tune, that concept is a giant bummer. So I went full Bacharach to lift the lyrics above the dread, and coated the song with a generous layer of 1960s orchestral schmaltz, which I find irresistibly euphoric. So much so that I even dusted off my trumpet from middle school to take a solo during the instrumental break."

=== Mixtape for the Milkyway ===
In 2020, Messersmith released "Mixtape for the Milkyway", described as "a collection of sad, beautiful songs written and performed by Minneapolis-based recording artist Jeremy Messersmith. A celebration of sonic minimalism and introspective non-fiction songwriting, delicately produced by John Mark Nelson, the songs and accompanying ambient videos provide a compelling emotional landscape worth a visit."

=== Fox/Coyote ===
On April 1, 2026, Messersmith released Fox/Coyote, his first studio album in seven years. The Star Tribune described the record as one of his most accessible to date, with synth-pop influences though lyrically dark and funny.

== Religion ==
While raised in an Assemblies of God church and later attending an Assemblies of God college, Messersmith identifies as an atheist.

== Discography ==
=== Albums and EPs ===
- The Alcatraz Kid, 2006
- The Silver City, 2008
- The Reluctant Graveyard, 2010
- Paper Moon (EP), 2012
- Heart Murmurs, 2014
- Late Stage Capitalism, 2018
- The Summit Avenue Swingers Society Presents jeremy messersmith Live at the Bryant Lake Bowl, 2024
- Fox/Coyote, 2026

=== Singles ===
- "Tatooine", 2010
- "Tourniquet", 2013
- "Purple Hearts", 2018
- "Sweep Me Off My Feet", 2018
- "666", 2022
- “Mall of America”, 2024
- “The New York Times Crossword Puzzle”, 2024
- “Billionaires”, 2025
- “You Know How I Like It”, 2025
- “Boomers”, 2025
- "The Wreck of the Edmund Fitzgerald", 2025
- "Stallions", 2026

=== Songbook ===
- 11 Obscenely Optimistic Songs For Ukulele: A Micro-Folk Record For The 21st Century And Beyond, 2017

=== Projects ===
- Mixtape for the Milkyway, 2020
