= Matt Patrick (producer) =

American musician

Matt Patrick (born June 15, 1974, Minneapolis, Minnesota) is an American record producer, studio owner, engineer, singer-songwriter and multi-instrumentalist. He grew up in the small community of North Branch, Minnesota, about an hour north of Minneapolis/St. Paul. Early on Patrick learned how to play piano, electric, acoustic and bass guitars and sing. After high school he began learning other instruments such as mandolin, accordion, dobro, pedal steel, Hammond organ, and various electronic synthesizers.

Patrick was the bass player and co-songwriter for the band pegtop (1995–2002) and also gave the group their distinct vocal harmonies. Patrick recorded five albums with pegtop, producing the latest two studio albums (Run, Run and The Counting Tree).

In 2002, Patrick recorded his first solo CD, titled Change, in several studios in the Twin Cities, including his basement studio, then enlisted Tom Herbers to mix. Some of the musicians on this album were Adam Levy (The Honeydogs), Randy Broughten (Gear Daddies, Trailer Trash, Cactus Blossoms) on pedal steel, Jeremy Ylvisaker, Bruce Balgaard, Brian Mangum and Chris DeWan, who were regular members of his band at that time. His album received very favorable reviews from national and international press.

2005 brought the release of his second album, Time Flies, which he recorded and mixed entirely in his home studio. In an attempt to search for sonically unique recordings, Patrick stumbled upon the works of Brian Eno and Daniel Lanois, and joined their quest for subtlety and beauty in the process of ambient recording. Brian A. Smith from the online publication Phantom Tollbooth gave Time Flies a rating of 4½ out of 5.

Alongside his own original material, Patrick has co-written songs with numerous people and has appeared as a guest musician on two Sara Groves albums (All Right Here and The Other Side of Something).

In 2005, Patrick moved to Bratislava, Slovakia to spend a year teaching English and music. Immediately following his return to the U.S., he started his first commercial recording studio, called Two Pillars. After a year and a half there he upgraded his studio to a much larger commercial space in the arts district of Northeast Minneapolis. He named the studio "The Library", as it has several thousand books that line the walls of each tracking room.

He also plays electric guitar in the band Greycoats. Various songs have been featured on several television shows including Orange Is the New Black, Teen Mom, Gossip Girl, and 16 and Pregnant. Patrick has produced, engineered, mixed, and played various instruments on all four albums for Greycoats: Setting Fire to the Great Unknown (2009), World of Tomorrow (2013), Adrift (2015) and Charisma (2018). He is the electric guitarist for the band Fathom Lane, and also produced and mixed their 2017 release, Asilomar. The listeners of Twin Cities radio station 89.3 The Current voted Fathom Lane's song, "Fingers and Toes", the number one local song in their Top 89 of 2017.

Currently, Patrick is a full-time record producer at his recording studio, the Library, in northeast Minneapolis. Some of the artists who have recorded there include Jeremy Messersmith, John Mark Nelson, Jeremy Ylvisaker with "Guitar Party," and Red House Records artists The Pines.

He has been nominated for best record producer for the Independent Music Awards in 2015 for Jourdan Myers Ruin Me With Love, 2016 for Greycoats Adrift, and in 2017 for Vicky Emerson Wake Me When The Wind Dies Down.

== Work ==
Artist	Year released	Album	Producer	Engineer	Mixer	Musician
Elisha Marin	2022	Christmas at the Library	♦	♦	♦	♦
Matt Hannah	2022	House of Illusion	♦	♦	♦	♦
Dan Rodriguez	2022	Troubadour Family Man			♦	
Wax/Wane	2022	Bundle Up			♦	
White Line Darko	2021	Break Free	♦	♦	♦	
Greta Nisswandt	2021	Girlfriend	♦	♦	♦	♦
Jeremy Messersmith	2021	Mixtape for the Milky Way		♦		
All the Islands	2021	Mistakes		♦		
Ben Tonak	2021	Places For Everything	♦	♦	♦	♦
Soubrette	2021	Skylight and Sophie’s World (singles)		♦	♦	
Sara Groves	2021	What Makes It Through		♦		
Forest Parotti	2021	Common Thread		♦	♦	
Midmorning Heist	2021	Midmorning Heist			♦	
Jon Arthur Schmidt	2021	From the Marrow	♦	♦	♦	♦
Tyler McCaninch	2021	The Glue That Held Us Together	♦	♦	♦	♦
CPC Music	2021	CPC Music		♦		
Louis and Dan & the Invisible Band	2021	Smörgåsbord	♦	♦	♦	♦
Elisha Marin	2021	Shining Out	♦	♦	♦	♦
Annie Mack	2021	Testify	♦	♦	♦	♦
Tawnya Smith	2021	Arrows	♦	♦	♦	♦
Christy Merry	2021	Here For You	♦	♦	♦	♦
Ben Brandt	2020	Since the Sunlight	♦	♦	♦	♦
Two Weeks Past Never	2020	Don’t You Feel Alive			♦	♦
Tina Schlieske	2020	What Would You Pay (single)		♦	♦	♦
Annie Fitzgerald	2020	I Know That Sound (single)	♦	♦	♦	♦
Sally Cranham	2020	Giants and Figs	♦	♦	♦	♦
Phoebe Katis	2020	It's Ok To Cry		♦		
Temper The Ghost	2020	Wide Awake (single)			♦	♦
Vicky Emerson	2020	Trouble (single)			♦	
Foreign Fields	2020	The Beauty Of Survival		♦		
Abigail Campbell	2020	Dear Girl			♦	
Gowns	2020	The Hollows	♦	♦	♦	♦
Ben Noble	2020	Where The Light Comes In		♦	♦	♦
Gambler's Daughter	2020	Serotinous Skin	♦	♦	♦	♦
Luke Spehar	2019	O Holy Night (single)	♦	♦	♦	♦
Louis and Dan and the Invisible Band	2019	Let's Imagine	♦	♦	♦	♦
Reina del Cid	2019	Morse Code	♦	♦	♦	♦
Dan Parotti	2019	Self Titled	♦	♦	♦	♦
Cory Wong	2019	Motivational Music for The Syncopated Soul		♦		
The Jolly Pops	2019	Bad Bad Dinosaur	♦	♦	♦	♦
Jillian Rae	2019	I Can't Be The One You Want Me To Be	♦	♦	♦	♦
Ami Andersen	2019	Wayfaring	♦	♦	♦	♦
Sam Cassidy	2019	Running Blind		♦		
Louis & Dan	2019	and the Invisible Band	♦	♦	♦	♦
Fathom Lane	2019	The Lookout (single)	♦	♦	♦	♦
The Minor Fall	2018	Candle Bright	♦	♦	♦	♦
Lynn O'Brien	2018	Rising	♦	♦	♦	♦
Ponderosa	2018	Ponderosa	♦	♦	♦	♦
Larry Long	2018	Slow Night		♦		
Greycoats	2018	Charisma	♦	♦	♦	♦
JØUR	2018	Chiaroscuro	♦	♦	♦	♦
Fathom Lane	2018	Laurelee (single)	♦	♦	♦	♦
Cory Wong	2018	The Optimist		♦		
Jillian Rae	2018	Medication (single)	♦	♦	♦	♦
JØUR	2018	Black Hole (single)	♦	♦		♦
Rachel Kurtz	2018	Love, Rachel Kurtz		♦		♦
Interlake	2018	Waiting For The Ocean	♦	♦	♦	♦
Ben Rosenbush and The Brighton	2018	Disparate Spheres	♦	♦	♦	♦
JØUR	2018	American Nightmare (single)	♦	♦		♦
The Jolly Pops	2018	We Are Happy Dads	♦	♦	♦	♦
Fathom Lane	2018	The Queen Of All Hearts (single)	♦	♦	♦	♦
Luke Spehar	2018	The Pilgrim	♦	♦	♦	♦
When We Land	2018	Introvert's Plight	♦	♦	♦	♦
The Fold	2017	From the Dust	♦	♦	♦	♦
Interlake	2017	The City Without You	♦	♦	♦	♦
JØUR	2017	Danger Game (single)	♦	♦		♦
Jillian Rae	2017	When Doves Cry (single)	♦	♦	♦	♦
Sarah Monson	2017	The Apple Tree	♦	♦	♦	♦
Greycoats	2017	Hypersleep	♦	♦	♦	♦
Fathom Lane	2017	Asilomar	♦	♦	♦	♦
Matt Hannah	2016	Dreamland	♦	♦	♦	♦
Aly Aleigha	2016	The Labyrinth	♦	♦		♦
Holly Henry	2016	King Paten	♦	♦	♦	♦
Karen Choi	2016	Through Our Veins	♦	♦	♦	♦
Vicky Emerson	2016	Wake Me When The Wind Dies Down	♦	♦	♦	♦
Preston Gunderson	2016	Face Yourself, Then The World		♦		
Brian Lenz	2016	Short Stories			♦	♦
The Paper Days	2016	Falling Is Easy	♦	♦	♦	♦
Sarah Kallies	2016	North	♦	♦	♦	♦
Eyedea	2015	The Many Faces of Mikey			♦ (3 tracks)	
Foreign Fields	2015	What I Kept In Hiding		♦		
Greycoats	2015	Adrift	♦	♦	♦	♦
John Mark Nelson	2015	I Am Not Afraid		♦		
MaSSs	2015	How I Killed A Bear	♦	♦	♦	♦
Holly Henry	2015	The Orchard	♦	♦	♦	♦
Kara Laudon	2015	I Wasn't Made		♦		
Clementine	2015	Crooked Brain	♦	♦	♦	
John Mark Nelson	2014	Sings the Moon	♦	♦	♦	♦
Elizabeth Hunnicutt	2014	The Arrival	♦	♦	♦	♦
Jourdan Myers	2014	Ruin Me With Love	♦	♦	♦	♦
Jonathan Rundman	2014	Look Up	♦	♦	♦	♦
Hope Hymns	2014	Volume 2	♦	♦	♦	♦
Put Down the Muffin	2014	Charged Particles	♦	♦	♦	♦
Josh Cleveland	2014	The Root of a Man		♦		♦
Jake Armerding	2013	Cosmos in the Chaos		♦	♦	♦
Greycoats	2013	World of Tomorrow	♦	♦	♦	♦
Vicky Emerson	2013	Dust and Echoes	♦	♦	♦	♦
Rachel Kurtz	2013	Broken and Lowdown	♦	♦	♦	♦
Ben Rosenbush and The Brighton	2012	A Wild Hunger		♦	♦	♦
The New Standards	2012	Sunday Morning Coming Down		♦		
Sarah Monson	2012	Dragonflies	♦	♦	♦	♦
Brynn Andre	2012	Let It Snow	♦	♦	♦	♦
Soul Rumination	2012	Fear & Love	♦	♦	♦	♦
Deb Carlson	2012	Tresses of Green	♦	♦	♦	♦
Surrounded by Werewolves	2012	Stranger Dance		♦		♦
Minnesota Adult and Teen Challenge	2012	I Am New	♦	♦	♦	♦
Mark Keating	2012	One in the Same	♦	♦	♦	♦
Hope Hymns	2012	Volume 1	♦	♦	♦	♦
Heatherlyn	2011	Storydwelling	♦	♦	♦	♦
The Rock	2011	Born to Die		♦	♦	♦
Clocks and Clouds	2011	Life Beyond Reason			♦	
A Thousand Falls	2011	Midnight			♦	
Annie Fitzgerald	2010	In Good Time	♦	♦	♦	♦
Danielle Thrush	2010	The Waiting	♦	♦	♦	♦
Jason Gray	2010	All the Lovely Losers	♦	♦		♦
Six Pack Heart Attacks	2010	Road of Love Forgotten	♦	♦	♦	♦
Norah Long	2010	View from Violet Hill	♦	♦	♦	♦
Vicky Emerson	2009	Long Ride	♦	♦	♦	♦
The Brighton	2009	self-titled		♦	♦	♦
Elizabeth Hunnicutt	2009	On the Way	♦	♦	♦	♦
Brett Tyler	2009	Bittersweet	♦	♦	♦	♦
Roger Flyer	2009	Songs Hidden In Eggs		♦	♦	♦
Greycoats	2009	Setting Fire to the Great Unknown	♦	♦	♦	♦
Tim Lemmens	2009	Even if	♦	♦	♦	♦
Caitlyn Smith	2007	Face Over Heels	♦	♦	♦	♦
Sarah Notley	2005	Broken Down Angel	♦	♦		♦
Precious Red	2005	Closer	♦	♦	♦	♦
Jason Gray	2003	Hoping; Live Vol.1	♦	♦	♦	♦
Matt Patrick	2002	Change	♦	♦	♦	♦
Pegtop	2002	Counting Tree	♦	♦		♦
Nic Johnson	2002	Weightless	♦	♦	♦	♦
Pegtop	1998	Run, Run	♦			♦

== Discography ==
- Change, 2002
- Time Flies, 2005
- The Rest of Right Now (Put Down the Muffin), 2005
- Setting Fire to the Great Unknown (Greycoats), 2008
- World of Tomorrow (Greycoats), 2013
- Charged Particles (Put Down the Muffin), 2014
- How I Killed A Bear (MaSSs), 2015
- Adrift (Greycoats), 2015
- Charisma (Greycoats), 2018
