= Panama Wedding =

American synthpop band

- Origin: United States
- Genres: Synthpop; indietronica; electronic rock
- Members: Peter Kirk

Panama Wedding is an American synthpop project led by singer and songwriter Peter Kirk. They released their debut single, "All of the People", in 2013, and it was included on their first EP, Parallel Play, which came out the following year. It charted at number 22 on the Billboard Top Heatseekers chart. Their next EP, Into Focus, was issued in 2015.

== Discography ==
=== EPs ===
Title	Album details	Peak chart positions
Title	Album details	US Heat
Parallel Play	Released: June 3, 2014; Label: Glassnote; Formats: Digital download	22
Into Focus	Released: November 6, 2015; Label: Glassnote; Formats: Digital download	n/a

=== Singles ===
Title	Year	Peak chart positions	Album
Title	Year	US Alt.	Album
"All of the People"	2013	38	Parallel Play EP
