= In Blue (The Static Jacks album) =

Studio album by The Static Jacks
- Released: October 1, 2013 (US)
- Genre: Punk rock Indie rock
- Length: 37:32
- Label: Old Friends Records

The Static Jacks chronology
Spray Tan (2012)	In Blue (2013)

In Blue is the second album released by The Static Jacks. The album was released on October 1, 2013 in the United States of America on Old Friends Records.

"I'll Come Back" was released as a free download through Rolling Stone's website on June 28, 2013. The music video for "I'll Come Back" premiered on July 23, 2013. The next song to be released was "Wallflowers" on August 8 with the music video premiering on September 18.

== Track listing ==
No.	Title	Length
1.	"Horror Story"	1:55
2.	"I'll Come Back"	2:45
3.	"Wallflowers"	3:17
4.	"Home Again"	2:54
5.	"We're Alright"	2:44
6.	"Katie Said"	3:21
7.	"Ninety Salt"	2:38
8.	"Decoder Ring"	3:59
9.	"In Blue"	3:24
10.	"People Don't Forget"	3:29
11.	"Greensleeves"	7:06
Total length:		37:32

== Release history ==
Country	Release date
United States	October 1, 2013
United Kingdom	September 30, 2013
