= Dauman Music =

American entertainment company and record label

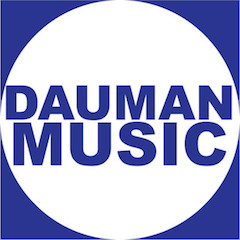
- Industry: Music, entertainment
- Founded: 2007; 19 years ago
- Headquarters: Los Angeles, United States
- Key people: Jason Dauman (Founder) and (CEO)
- Website: daumanmusic.com

Dauman Music is an American entertainment company and record label headquartered in Los Angeles. The company was founded in 2007 by Jason Dauman who was originally a song placer and music publisher.

In 2019, Dauman Music was the No. 5 Dance Label Imprint and the No. 8 Dance Club Label according to Billboard Magazine's year end charts.

Dauman Music has had 3 No. 1 songs on the Billboard Dance Club Chart: "Euphoria" by The Perry Twins featuring Harper Starling (2018), "Back to Life" by Hilary Roberts (2019), and "Self Control" by Kendra Erika (2019).

The company has represented songs released by notable artists such as Dionne Warwick, Debbie Gibson, Marc Stout, Jessica Sutta of the Pussycat Dolls, Tyga, Melissa Manchester, Al Jarreau, Snoop Dogg, Sean Kingston, Fat Joe, Frankie J, Jeff Timmons, Tiffany, and Clint Holmes.

== Jason Dauman ==
Jason Dauman was born in Manhattan and is a cousin to former Viacom CEO Phillipe Dauman. His father Sidney founded Dauman Displays, one of the world's leading point of purchase display companies, whose clients included Revlon, Gillette, Elizabeth Arden, Anheuser-Busch among many others.

Jason's career has spanned three decades and has included work as a record executive, song placer, music supervisor, music publisher, marketing and promoting expert, and founder and CEO of pop/dance label Dauman Music.

Dauman states,

"I grew up enjoying a wide variety of up-tempo music, so it was only natural after working strictly in pop music for many years that I would run a label devoted to electronic dance music and dance oriented pop. When I first launched Dauman Music, the genre was an underdog, looked down upon by the industry, like an unwanted musical child. I devoted my energies to rallying behind it. I'm glad to say it's not only no longer the underdog, but it's everywhere, more popular than ever, and still growing. It's been a pleasure to witness the growth of electronic music."

As a song placer and music publisher, Dauman worked independently and later joined Universal Music Group. Dauman has represented, at one point or another, U2, Bruce Springsteen, Burt Bacharach, Carole Bayer Sager, Billy Steinberg, Garth Brooks, Glen Ballard, Tom Kelly, Rick Nowels, John Wesley Harding, Makeba Riddick, The Jackie Boyz, Damon Elliott, Maria McKee, Allan Rich, and Frank Wildhorn.

Early in his career, Dauman introduced his client Albert Hammond to Diane Warren resulting in a collaboration that lead to several hit singles including "Nothing's Gonna Stop Us Now" by Starship and "Don't Turn Around" by Ace of Base along with other singles for Elton John, Aretha Franklin, Neil Diamond, Chicago, Joe Cocker, and Tina Turner among others. He later went on to place the Billboard No. 1 hit "I Don't Have the Heart" with James Ingram, and "I'll Stand by You" with The Pretenders. Others who have recorded the song I'll Stand By You include Carrie Underwood, Rod Stewart, Girls Aloud, Patti LaBelle, and Shirley Bassey. Dauman's placement of "Falling into You" by Billy Steinberg for Celine Dion became the titular track on her Grammy Award-winning album.

== Dauman Music ==
Dauman music was founded in 2007. It has had over 75 charting singles and has been a particularly strong force in the Dance Club Songs chart of Billboard. In 2019, Billboard Magazine named Dauman Music the No. 5 Dance Imprint Label of the Year, and the No. 8 Dance Record Label of the Year thanks in part to Billboard Dance Club Songs No. 1 hits by Kendra Erika ("Self Control"), and Hilary Roberts ("Back to Life").

Other popular songs associated with the label include "Girls Night Out" by Debbie Gibson, "You Really Started Something" by Dionne Warwick, "Just Another Day" by Tiffany, "Lithium" by Athena, "Forever" by Ralphi Rosario featuring Frankie, "Oasis" by Kendra Erika, and "Let it Rain" by Amy Weber and Sean Kingston, as well as hits by Snoop Dogg, Tiffany, Taylor Dayne, Joanna Krupa, Jeff Timmons, Frankie J, Klymaxx feat. Bernadette Cooper, and Laura Bryna.

Some of the remixers associated with Dauman Music are Dave Audé, Klaas, Tracy Young, Ralphie Rosario, The Wideboys, Moto Blanco, Sick Individuals, Liquid Todd, DJ Kue, Stonebridge, and Narada Michael Walden.

The company is also involved with jazz and pop music. In 2017, the label partnered with L&L Music to lead the promotional campaign for jazz singer Clint Holmes's album "Rendezvous" produced by Gregg Field. The album featured prominent jazz artists such as Jane Monheit, Ledisi, Dave Koz, Dee Dee Bridgewater, and The Count Basie Orchestra. The album was nominated for a Grammy Award in 2017.

Jason Dauman is heavily active in the company and enjoys being involved with all aspects of its operation including working with producers and remixers, video production, promotion, public relations and social media, and product placement and licensing.

=== Complete List of Billboard Dance Club Songs Charting Singles ===
Year	Song Title	Artist	Chart Peak Position
2005	Tell It to the Moon	Stephani Krise	16
2006	You Know How to Love Me	Lori Jenaire	19
2006	When you Walk Away	Henri	23
2006	Walking Down Madison	Esza Kayne	41
2007	Some Girls	Henri	1
2007	Evenly	Lenna	29
2007	Higher	Tiffany	19
2007	Goodnight Tonight	DJ Scotty K feat. Knockhopper	29
2007	Push the Button	Henri	26
2008	I Can Hear the Money	Lenna	35
2008	I Should Have Been Blonde	Jenn Fredrick	31
2008	Ell Est Tres LA	Lenna	43
2008	Just Another Day	Tiffany	28
2008	Sweat	Erin Stevenson	20
2009	Emergency	Carmen Perez	40
2009	Give Me Tonight	Frenchie Davis & TR	21
2009	Deja Vu	America Olivo	36
2009	I Wanna Be Your Baby	Henri	28
2010	Overload	Carmen Perez	40
2010	Blackout in Wonderland	Jackie Siebert	37
2010	Just a Man	Snoop Dogg feat. George Hodos	24
2010	Habit	Margo	28
2011	I Love Music	Dionne Mitchell	22
2011	Get Back	Margo	35
2012	I'm Free	Hayla	23
2012	Let It Rain	Amy Weber	40
2012	Alright	Frankie	27
2012	Firecracka	KORR-A	18
2013	Forever	Ralphi Rosario & Frankie	7
2013	Dance of Life	Amy Weber feat. Sean Kingston	39
2013	Indestructible	Veronica Jensen	10
2014	What's Done, is Done	Pris Mavrick	25
2014	One and One	Ashley J	23
2015	Fly Alone	Brianna Rubio feat. Fat Joe	22
2015	With You	Cheyenne Elliot	16
2015	Cali	Ralphi Rosario feat Ashley J	10
2015	More Than a Feeling	Brianna Rubio	11
2015	Shockwaves	Degrazio	23
2016	Lithium	Athena	3
2016	Frozen	Natty Rico feat. Melissa Molinaro, Frankie J, & D. One	22
2016	Love Overdoes	Nikki Lund	12
2016	When It All Falls Apart	D'Liannie	33
2016	Get Together	Christine Saade & Twisted Dee	18
2017	Oasis	Kendra Erika	9
2017	Little Diva	Taja Sevelle	30
2017	Living in the Moonlight	Majesty	34
2017	Under My Skin	Kendra Erika	6
2017	Living For Tonight	Dena Ordway	29
2017	Bloom	Emily Perry	9
2017	Dark Day	Olga	27
2017	With Every Beat of My Heart	Raphael	25
2018	Remedy	Gerina feat. Nomad	15
2018	Sublime	Kendra Ericka	17
2018	Euphoria	The Perry Twins feat. Kendra Erika	1
2018	Walking in Silence	Emily Perry	13
2018	Body Up	Dave Allen feat. Arianny Celeste	29
2018	There For You	Hilary Roberts	10
2018	Miss Me	Sted-E & Hybrid Heights feat. Mimi	5
2018	Summer On Lock	Emily Perry	9
2018	Hydrolove (Take Me to LA)	Dan DeLeon & Anthony Griego feat. Kris Kollins	30
2018	Self Control	Kendra Erika	1
2018	One Call Away	Harper Starling feat. The Perry Twins	35
2019	Turn Me Up	Brianna Rubio & Tyga	3
2019	Boy Problems	Harper Starling	16
2019	Wet	Kea	33
2019	Fires	Chris Erasmus	23
2019	Miss Me	MIMI	33
2019	Back To Life	Hilary Roberts	1
2019	Our Song Comes On	Marc Stout feat. Jessica Sutta	8
2019	A Deeper Love	Kendra Erika	10
2019	Madness and the Dark	Dave Matthias feat. Makeba	13
2019	You Really Started Something	Dionne Warwick	16
2019	Sweet Revenge	Kalendar & Laura Bryna	16
2019	Break the Wheel	Kendra Erika	8
2019	Get Back to Love	Kris James	27
2019	Girls Night Out	Debbie Gibson	TBA
2019	Good Man	Hilary Roberts	TBA
2019	Spell On Me	Shab	TBA

== See also ==
- List of record labels
