= Eric Sanicola =

American singer-songwriter

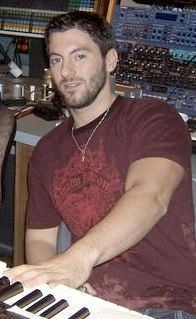
- Born: May 6, 1981 (age 45); Rockville Centre, New York, U.S.
- Known for: Production/Songwriting

Eric Sanicola production discography
- Live albums: 16
- Singles: 12
- B-sides: 1
- Music videos: 7
- Soundtracks: 1

Eric Sanicola (born May 6, 1981) is an American music producer and songwriter credited on numerous Gold and Platinum albums, including various Billboard magazine charting singles.

== Career ==
Since the start of his career in 2003, he has written and/or produced songs (most notably) for Big Time Rush, Cascada, CoCo Lee, Jennifer Lopez, Bishop Briggs, Cher Lloyd, One Direction, Paulina Rubio, Yanni, and David Bisbal among others. He began his career as a staff producer for Ric Wake and later, RedOne. In addition to contemporary pop music production, he has also done production work on the Disney film Enchanted and TV advertisements for Sunsilk, Stride Rite, and others.

== Beginnings ==
Sanicola's first opportunity came in 2000. At 18 years old, he wrote lyrics for Jennifer Lopez. Although they were not used on her album, he was able to capture the attention of producer Ric Wake, who gave Sanicola a publishing and production deal for the next six years, from whom Sanicola says he learned a great deal.

== Discography ==
2003

- Thalia "Baby I'm In Love" Thalia (Virgin Records/ EMI Latin) — Arrangement

2005

- CoCo Lee "All Around The World" (Charlie's Angels 2 Soundtrack in Asia) — writer/producer
- CoCo Lee "No Doubt" — writer/producer
- Michael Bolton "Still the love of my life" — writer

2006

- Paulina Rubio "N.O." — writer/producer
- Paulina Rubio "Miénteme Una Vez Más" — Producer
- David Bisbal "Calentando Voy" — writer/producer
- Anthony Callea "Hurt So Bad" — writer/producer

2007

- Corbin Bleu "Marchin" Another Side (Hollywood Records) — Additional Production

2008

- Marié Digby "Say It Again" — writer
- Vlad Topalov "Perfect Criminal" (Russia) — writer/producer

2009

- Yanni "The Keeper" — writer
- Yanni "I'm So" — writer
- Yanni "Orchid" — writer

2010

- Big Time Rush "Halfway There" BTR (Columbia/Epic) —
- Big Time Rush "City Is Ours" BTR (Columbia/Epic) — writer/producer
- J Brazil "Girl I'm Tryin" (Ultra Records) — writer/producer
- Sweetbox "Echo" Diamond Veil (Warner Music Japan, Sony Music Entertainment Korea Inc., Parasongs International Corporation) — writer
- Sirens "Don't Let Go" — writer

2011

- Big Time Rush "Elevate", Elevate, (Columbia/Epic) — writer/producer
- Cher Lloyd "Over The Moon", Sticks and Stones (Syco Music/Epic) — writer/producer
- One Direction "Another World", Up All Night (certain countries only), (Syco/Columbia) — writer
- Fairies "Hero" (Japan) — writer
- Alex Sparrow "Get You" Eurovision Song Contest 2011 — writer

2012

- U.V.U.K "Blink" (Robbins Entertainment)
- Jennifer Lopez "I'm Glad" (Ric Wake Unplugged Mix) (Epic Records) Producer/Featured Artist

2013

- Panama Wedding "All of the People" (Glassnote Records)— Writer/Producer
- Porcelain Black "How Do You Love Someone" (Capital/2101) — Writer/Producer
- Big Time Rush "Run Wild" 24/7, (Columbia/Epic) — Writer/Producer
- Big Time Rush "Love Me Again" 24/7, (Columbia/Epic) — Writer/Producer
- Dizzee Rascal "Love This Town" (featuring Teddy Sky) The Fifth, (Universal Music Group) — Writer/Producer
- Midnight Red "Merry Christmas, Happy Holidays" (Capital/2101) — Producer
- Midnight Red "Say Yes" (Capital/2101) — Writer/Producer
- Shinee "321" (EMI Records Japan) — Writer/Producer

2014

- Penavega "Electrico" (Single) — Writer/Producer
- Cara Quici "Fight" (QMH Records) — Writer/Producer
- Cascada "Blink" (Zooland Records) — Writer
- Cory Lee "Boomerang" (Costa Music Inc.) — Writer/Producer
- The Next Star Supergroup: Rebel Coast "Don't Stop Now" (The Next Star) — Writer/Producer
- The Next Star Supergroup: Electric Ave "Big Bang" (The Next Star) — Writer/Producer
- Bonnie Anderson "Blackout" (Sony Australia) — Writer/Producer
- Kim Sozzi "Never Say Goodnight" (Nervous Records) — Writer/Producer
- Abraham Mateo "It's U", Who I AM, (Sony Music Spain) — Writer
- Abraham Mateo "Fue Un Error Amarte", Who I AM, (Sony Music Spain) — Writer
- After Romeo "Juliet" single (Sony Music Japan) — Writer/Producer

2016

- Banners "Start A Riot (Thundatraxx Remix)" (Island/Universal) -Producer/Remixer
- Tiffany "Yellow Light" I Just Wanna Dance (SM Entertainment) - Writer/Producer
- Abraham Mateo "I'm Feelin' So Good" Are You Ready?, (Sony Music Spain) — Writer
- Jordan White "High Road" (Pangea Records) - Writer/Producer
- OoVee ft. Damon Sharpe "Free Spirits" (Universal Italy) - Writer
- Yanni "Rapture" — Writer

2017

- Bishop Briggs "Wild Horses (Thundatraxx and SKX Remix)" (Island/Universal) -Producer/Remixer
- New Kids On The Block "Hard Not Lovin' U" Thankful, (NKOTB Music LLC) -Songwriter/Producer
- Jordyn Jones "Summer" (Reload Music Group) -Producer/Songwriter
- SF9 "Wen Gamseongpariya (웬 감성팔이야; Why Are You So Sensetive)" Knights of the Sun, (FNC/LOEN) -Songwriter/Producer

2018

- Shinee "3 2 1" Shinee The Best From Now On (EMI Records Japan) -Producer/Writer
- Jordyn Jones "Can't Say No" (Reload Music Group) -Producer/Songwriter
- Kendra Erika "Self Control" (Dauman Music) -Producer
- Aveeno "Maxglow Commercial" -Producer
- Hilary Roberts "There For You" (Dauman Music) -Writer/Producer

2019

- Twice "Happy Happy" (JYP Entertainment) -Writer
- Jordyn Jones "Cover up" (Reload Music Group) -Producer/Songwriter
- Hilary Roberts "Back To Life" (Dauman Music) -Writer/Producer

2020

- Dave Winnel and Damon Sharpe, with Shannon "Under Your Control" (Armada Music) -Songwriter
- La Lana "So Messed Up" (Warner Music) -Producer/Songwriter
- Parisalexa ft. Dawty Music "Troubled Waters" (Single) — Writer/Producer
- Nexplanon "Vanessa Hudgens Commercial" -Producer/ writer
- Thundatraxx "Every Breath You Take".(Soave Records) – Artist/ Producer

== Sources ==
- "ASCAP ACE SEARCH, SANICOLA ERIC JOHN". ASCAP. Archived from the original on 2016-01-15., career credits recorded by ASCAP (not a complete listing of career credits)
