= The Perry Twins =

The Perry Twins may refer to:

- Alan and Michael Perry, miniature wargaming sculptors (also known as the Perry Brothers)
- The Perry Twins (duo), a Los Angeles-based DJ/dance music producer duo
