= Hilary Roberts =

American singer

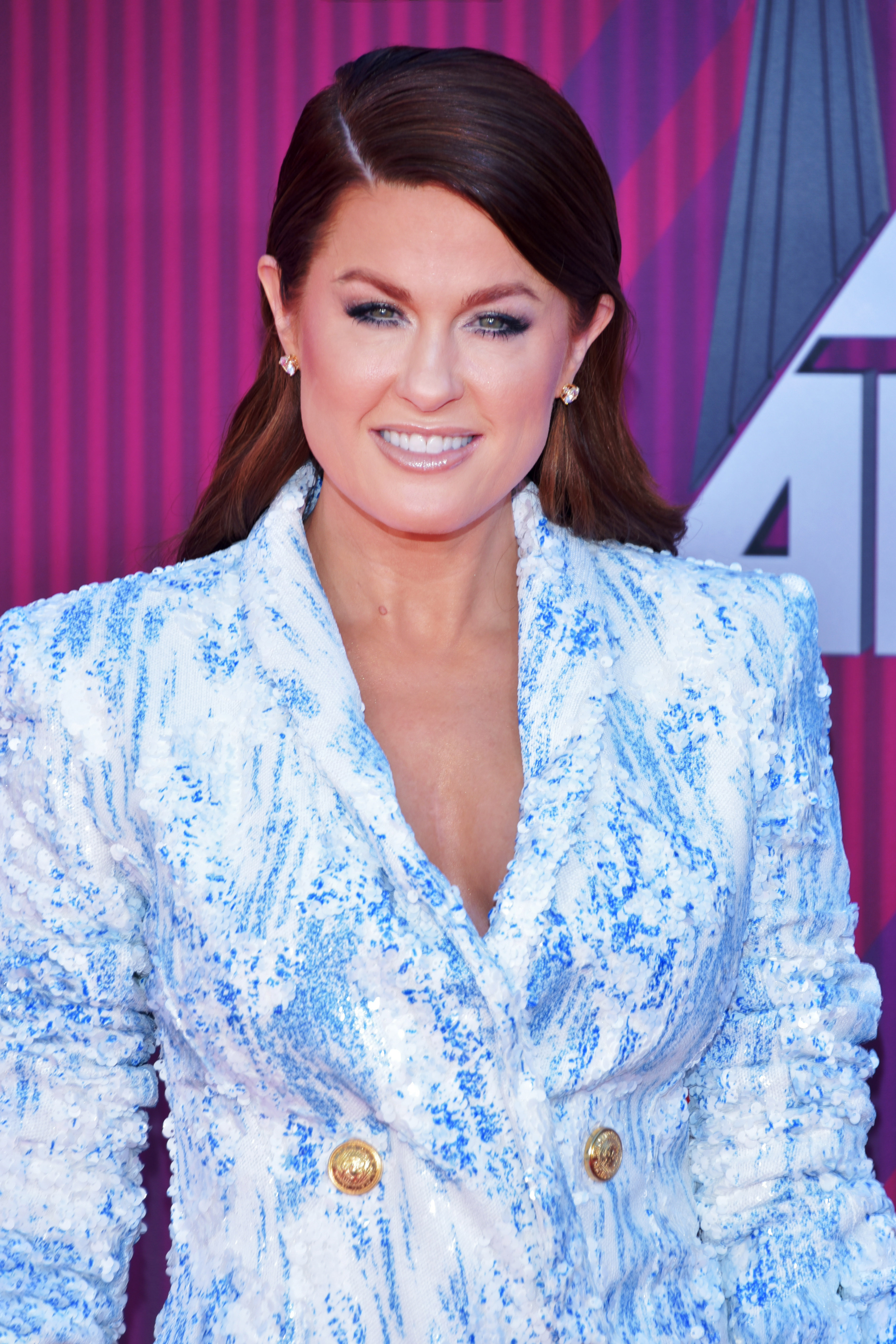
- Roberts in 2019

Background information
- Born: Denver, Colorado, United States
- Genres: Pop; dance; adult contemporary
- Occupations: Singer, Songwriter, Philanthropist
- Instrument: Vocals
- Website: www.hilaryroberts.com

Hilary Lacey Roberts is an American singer, songwriter and philanthropist. She was born in Denver, Colorado and currently resides in Dallas, Texas. Her single "There for You" (2018) proved a success and became her first top-ten single on the Billboard Dance Club Songs chart. The following year, her recording of the Soul II Soul song, Back to Life (However Do You Want Me) peaked at number one on the Dance Club Songs chart.

== Early life ==
As a young girl, after watching a performance of the broadway show "Annie," she decided early on that she would try to develop her talent as a singer. She began singing in dinner theaters in her area and continued on to regional talent shows and singing competitions. She has appeared in commercials for the Ronald McDonald house and diabetes awareness.

After having suffered from alcoholism and drug addiction at an early age, Roberts has been sober since May 1997. She also suffered from a rare congenital heart condition that almost proved fatal.

== Career ==
Hilary is signed to her own label Red Songbird, and through it released her single "There for You". She collaborates closely with producers and songwriters Damon Sharpe and Eric Sanicola, who have worked on a number of her tracks. Roberts returned for a second run on Dance Club Songs, debuting at No. 47 with "Back to Life", a cover of Soul II Soul's 30-year-old pop/R&B smash "Back to Life (However Do You Want Me)," featuring Caron Wheeler, which spent three weeks at No. 1 in August–September 1989. Her rendition was remixed by Andrew Wilson and Richard Cutmore, the Perry Twins (duo) and Wideboys, among others. Roberts told Billboard, "I was at dinner with Dauman Music label owner Jason Dauman,...my producer Damon Sharpe and we were talking about old-school songs that had a huge impact. I started singing 'Back to Life' and Jason said, 'You sound great singing that song. You should really consider redoing it.' I hadn't thought about singing it before because Soul II Soul's performance with Caron Wheeler's incredible vocals was extremely powerful. It was a bit intimidating to tackle this incredible song, but my team said, 'Let's do this!'" Her third single, "Fight to the Other Side" was released in May 2019 in honor of her friend, who has a rare form of muscular dystrophy known as FSHD. An accompanying music video was directed by Liz Imperio and shot with critically acclaimed dancers Michael Dameski and Charity Anderson.

== Charitable work ==
In May 2019, Hilary launched the Red Songbird Foundation at the Beverly Hilton Hotel. The Red Songbird Foundation, which began its work in 2009, celebrated its public launch in 2019 and aims to help survivors of trauma caused by sexual, physical and verbal abuse. Terry Crews hosted the event and other stars, such as Jermaine Dupri, James Maslow, Chloe Lukasiak, Clinton Sparks, Pixie Lott, Austin Mahone, and Mario Lopez were also in attendance. Gabriel Iglesias was the celebrity guest comedian for the evening with a special performance by Charlie Wilson.

== Discography ==
Singles

- "There for You" (2018)
- "Back to Life" (2019)
- "Fight to the Other Side" (2019)
