= Saint Andrew's School (Florida) =

Private school in Boca Raton, Florida, US

- Saint Andrew's School Coat of Arms

Location
- 3900 Jog Road; Boca Raton, Florida 33434; United States; 26.3857°N 80.1456°W

Information
- Type: Private, College-prep, Day & Boarding
- Motto: Semper Stellas Spectemus (Latin) (Let us always look to the stars)
- Denomination: Episcopal Church
- Established: 1961
- Founder: Episcopal School Foundation
- Grades: Pre-K–12
- Gender: Co-education
- Campus size: 81 acres (330,000 m^{2})
- Colors: Red, White
- Athletics conference: FHSAA
- Mascot: Scotty
- Nickname: Scots
- Accreditation: Cognia (AdvancED); FCIS; IBO
- Yearbook: Tartan
- Affiliations: Round Square; NAIS; NAES; NACAC; Johns Hopkins CTY
- Website: www.saintandrews.net

Saint Andrew's School is a private Episcopal pre-kindergarten through twelfth grade day and boarding school in Boca Raton, Florida. Founded in 1961 as an all-boys boarding secondary school, it became coeducational in 1971. The school later expanded to include lower and middle school divisions.

Saint Andrew's enrolls approximately 1,340 students, including about 110 boarding students. The school offers the International Baccalaureate (IB) programme, as well as Advanced Placement (AP) and honors courses in the Upper School. Its 81-acre campus includes academic, arts, athletic, and residential facilities.

The school participates in interscholastic athletics under the Florida High School Athletic Association (FHSAA). Its athletic teams have won more than fifty state team championships and two national championships.

Saint Andrew's is accredited by Cognia and the Florida Council of Independent Schools (FCIS).

== History ==
Saint Andrew's School was founded in 1961 by the Episcopal School Foundation as a boarding school for boys. Fifty acres of land was donated by the ARVIDA Corporation and the Butts family on condition that a Christian school be established there, and early financial support came from Alexander D. Henderson Jr. and his wife, Lucia Maria Henderson. The Rev. Hunter Wyatt-Brown Jr. served as its first headmaster and the Rev. Raymond M. O'Brien as its first chaplain. The school opened on September 21, 1962, with 122 boarding and day students, including boys from as far away as Rio de Janeiro, Lima, and British Honduras.

By 1971, the campus had grown to 70 acres, and the school admitted its first female day students; the first female boarding students followed a year later, in 1972. Further expansion came in stages: a Middle School (grades 6–8) opened in 1994, a Lower School (kindergarten through grade 5) in 2000, and a Junior Kindergarten (pre-K) program in 2008. Together, these additions transformed Saint Andrew's from a single-sex boarding school into a coeducational pre-K–12 day and boarding school.

== Student body ==
As of 2026, Saint Andrew's reports a total enrollment of 1,340 students, comprising approximately 420 in the Lower School , 275 in the Middle School, and 640 in the Upper School. The school's 110 boarding students come from more than 26 countries, and international students make up about 5 percent of total enrollment. Approximately 26 percent identify as students of color, and 18 percent of the student body receives financial assistance.

== Academics ==
All three divisions of the school offer an International Baccalaureate curriculum, alongside Honors and Advanced Placement coursework in the Upper School. The curriculum spans STEM, humanities, world languages, and interdisciplinary studies. In 2010 the school joined Round Square, a network of schools focused on experiential learning, leadership, service, and international understanding.

The school offers performing arts (band, chorus, dance, guitar, orchestra, and theatre), visual arts (painting, drawing, ceramics, and multimedia), and media arts (film, multimedia communications, and broadcasting) across all divisions.

Saint Andrew's operates a College Guidance Office to support college admissions counseling; nearly all graduates enroll in four-year colleges and universities.

== Athletics ==
Saint Andrew's fields more than 20 interscholastic teams across the Middle and Upper School divisions, competing under the Florida High School Athletic Association. The school has won two national championships—in boys' tennis (1989–90) and squash (2023–24)—as well as 53 state team championships and 72 individual state championships in sports including tennis, swimming, lacrosse, golf, water polo, cross country, track and field, basketball, and soccer.

== Campus ==
Saint Andrew's occupies an 81-acre campus in a residential area of Boca Raton, Florida, about five miles from the Atlantic Ocean. The grounds feature tropical landscaping, banyan trees, and a central pond, with residence halls near the center of campus accommodating approximately 100 Upper School boarding students, supported by residential faculty apartments and common spaces.

Since the early 2000s, the school has completed more than $30 million in construction and renovation projects, including Justin Hall, Henderson Hall, Parker Library, the Dr. Albert Cohen Family Center for Entrepreneurial Studies, and the Kessler Digital Media Institute. Under the school's 2015 campus master plan, Henderson Hall was renovated and Parker Library was returned to the building where it was originally located when the school opened in 1962.

=== Academic and administrative facilities ===
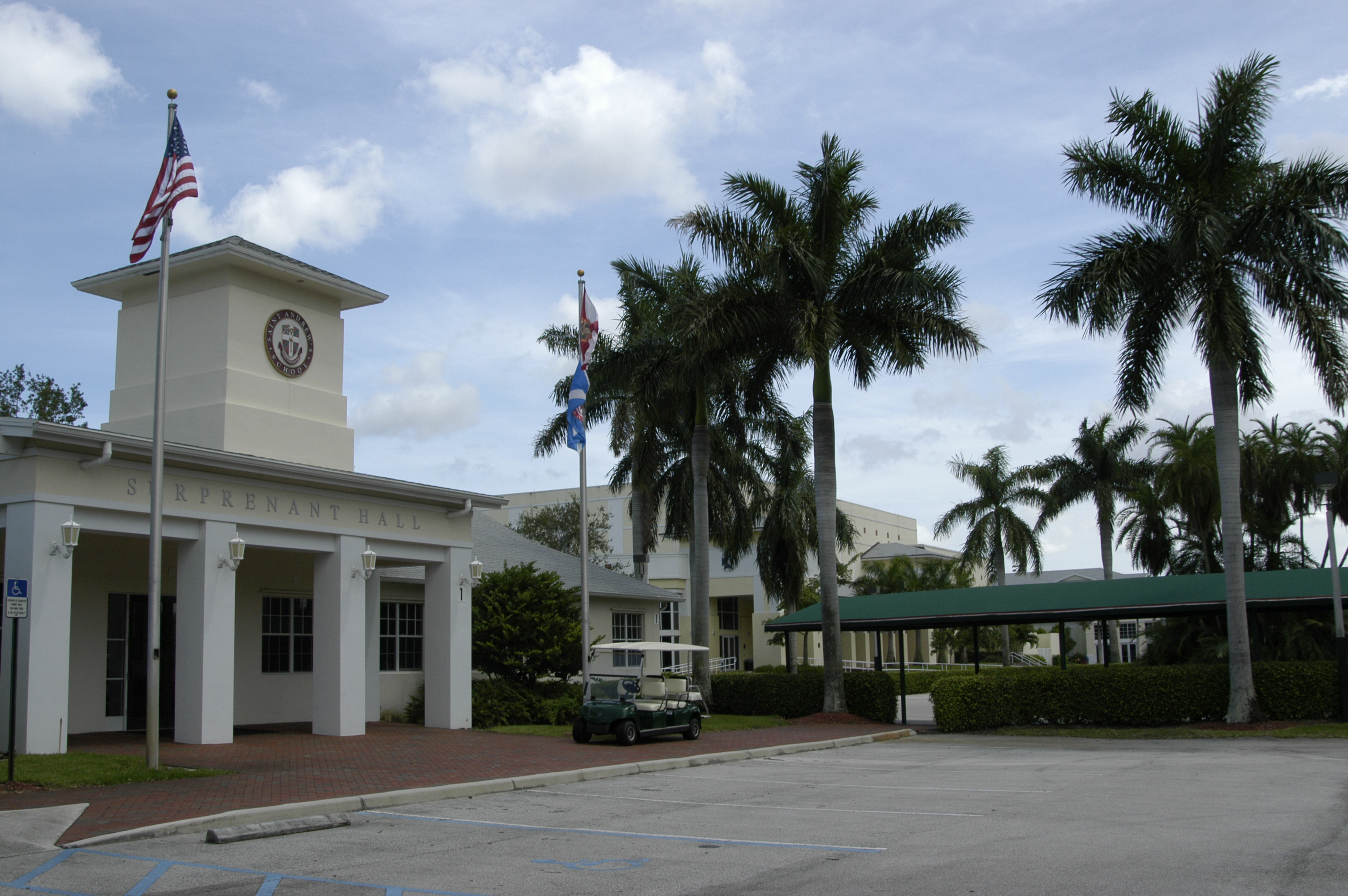
Suprenant Hall

Academic facilities include the Schmidt Family Science Center; the Dr. Albert Cohen Family Center for Entrepreneurial Studies; the Kessler Digital Media Institute; the Moabery Early Years Learning Center, which serves Junior Kindergarten and early-childhood programs; and Parker Library.

Justin Hall, completed in 2019, houses the school's Advancement Office. Suprenant Hall, built in 1963 as a student union, provides additional instructional and administrative space.

In 2025 the school opened Charles and Hagerty Hall, a 26,000-square-foot academic building constructed as an expansion of the former Rooks Hall. The $25 million facility contains 17 classrooms, specialized testing spaces, administrative offices, the Stern Family Learning Center, the Afsaneh Z. Siadat Faculty Collaboration Center, and the Shibe Flagler Macfarland Family Student Terrace.

=== Arts and athletic facilities ===
Performing arts programs are housed in Wight Hall – The Center for Performing Arts, a 35,000-square-foot facility that opened in 2005 as Andrews Hall before later being renamed. At its center is the 655-seat Roberts Theater, used for major productions, concerts, and assemblies. The building also includes a black box theater and dedicated practice studios for band, orchestra, percussion, guitar, and choral groups, along with renovated collaboration and backstage spaces.

Athletic facilities include the Stoops Family Gymnasium, the Shapiro Family Adventure Gymnasium with indoor climbing walls, the Scott Family Gymnasium, and the Malnik Family Athletic Center, along with the multi-sport Don Jones Memorial Field, a baseball field, a softball field, a competition track, multiple practice fields, a 12-court tennis complex, and the Brockway Family Training and Fitness Center. Aquatic facilities include the Duff Tyler Aquatic Complex and the Reid Family Olympic-size pool.

=== Chapels ===
Although affiliated with the Episcopal Church, the school describes itself as welcoming students of all faiths, customs, cultures, and beliefs.

The campus includes two chapels. The Chapel of Saint Andrew the Apostle, dedicated in April 1967, serves the Middle and Upper School with weekly services officiated by the school's chaplains, and also functions as an active parish of the Episcopal Diocese of Southeast Florida.

The Chickee Chapel, an open-air, thatched-roof structure built in 1962 at the suggestion of founding chaplain Raymond M. O'Brien, was constructed by Seminole craftsmen from the Dania Indian Reservation and rebuilt in 2007. Beyond its role as a historic campus landmark, it has hosted observances from non-Christian traditions, including a 2025 Tashlich ritual for Rosh Hashanah.

== Accreditation and memberships ==
Saint Andrew's School is accredited by the Florida Council of Independent Schools (FCIS) and nationally by Cognia. It is also authorized as an International Baccalaureate (IB) World School.

The school is a member of numerous professional and educational organizations, including the National Association of Independent Schools (NAIS), the National Association of Episcopal Schools (NAES), the College Board, and the National Association for College Admission Counseling (NACAC).

The school is also affiliated with Round Square and the Johns Hopkins Center for Talented Youth (CTY).

== Faculty and leadership ==
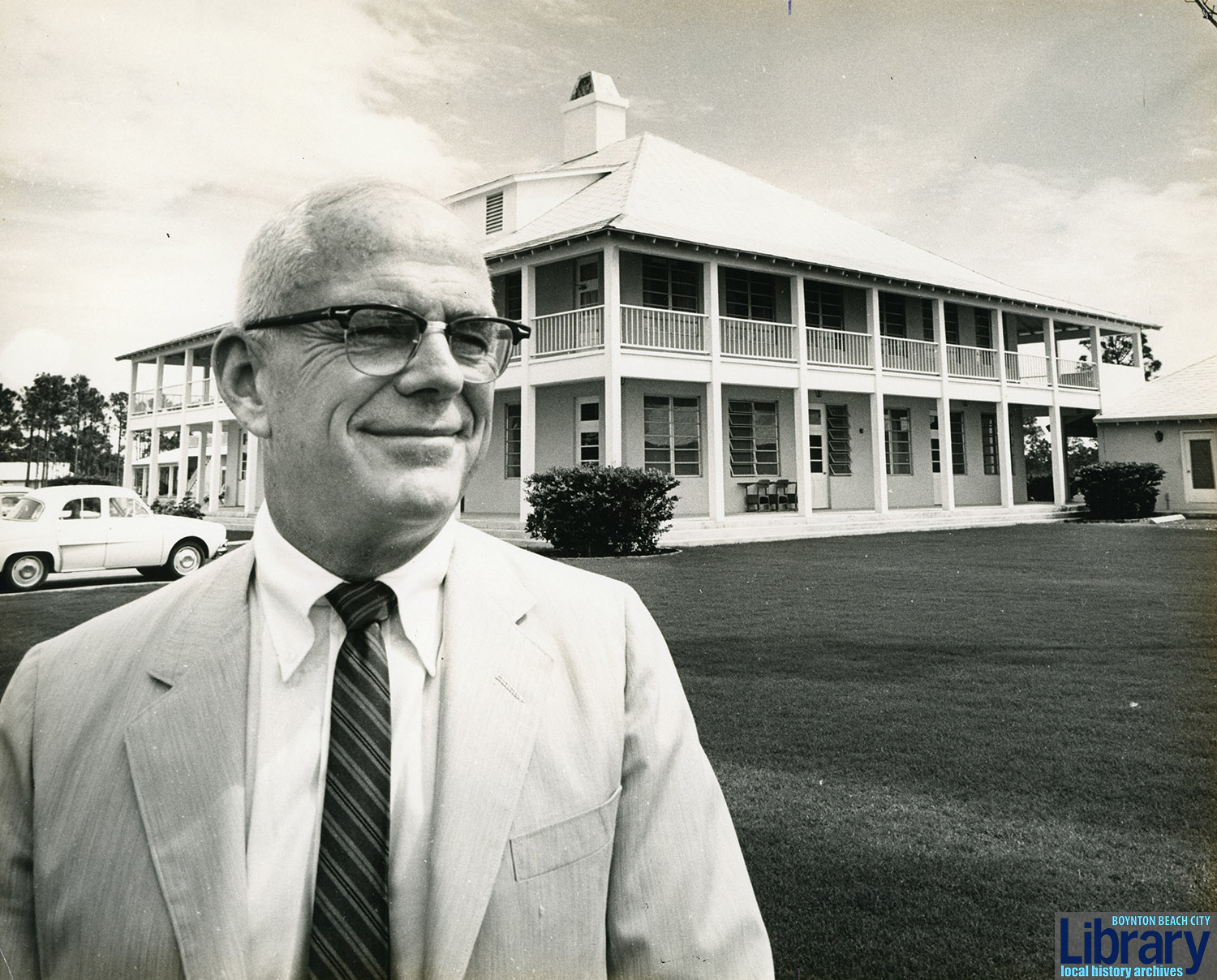
Head of School H. Proctor Martin standing outside Henderson Hall at Saint Andrew's, 1964

Saint Andrew's lists 166 classroom teachers and 24 administrators. Sixty-two percent of teachers and administrators hold a master's degree and eleven percent hold a doctorate.

The school is governed by a Head of School (formerly called Headmaster) and a board of trustees, which oversee strategic planning, financial oversight, and institutional governance.

Saint Andrew's has had the following heads of school since its founding:

1. 1962–1963 – Rev. Hunter Wyatt-Brown Jr.
2. 1963–1964 – H. Proctor Martin
3. 1964–1971 – Eugene J. Curtis Jr.
4. 1971–1974 – Frederic L. Burr
5. 1974–1986 – John Pierce Cotton
6. 1986–1989 – Rev. William Posey
7. 1989–2007 – Rev. George E. Andrews II
8. 2007–2012 – Dr. Ann Marie Krejcarek
9. 2013–2016 – Peter B. Benedict II
10. 2016–2017 – Dr. James Byer
11. 2017–present – Ethan W. Shapiro

== Notable campus events ==
The Miami Dolphins used the campus as their training camp facility from August 7, 1966, to April 24, 1970, after relocating there from a prior training site in the St. Petersburg, Florida area.

The campus was used as a filming location for training-camp sequences in the 1968 film Paper Lion, based on George Plimpton's book of the same name.

The campus has also hosted notable summer sports programs, including the PGA National Academy of Golf for Juniors, a summer golf camp for youth aged 12 to 18 directed by Gary Wiren, which utilized the school's facilities while playing at the nearby Boca West Golf Club.

In October 2013, Saint Andrew's hosted the Round Square International Conference under the theme "Waves of Change," drawing roughly 500 students and 200 adult delegates from Round Square member schools worldwide.

Since April 2018, the school has annually hosted TEDxSaintAndrewsSchool, an official TEDx event series featuring live presentations.

In June 2026, Saint Andrew's School served as the inaugural Southeast U.S. host site for the Johns Hopkins Center for Talented Youth (CTY), offering three-week advanced academic summer day programs for students in grades 2 through 8.

== Notable former students ==
Catalina Pérez	Josh Minott	Morgan Pressel	Don Wilson
Danny Young	Adam Stewart	Tinsley Ellis	Kendra Erika
Corina Morariu	Michael Yani	Vince Spadea	Anthony Polite

=== Sports ===
- Jake Bargas – NFL player.
- Anthony Bartone – professional sports car racer.
- Izaak Bastian – Olympic swimmer.
- Matt Bellando – professional lacrosse player.
- Marshall Duane – Olympic trials sailor.
- Daniel G. Fernandez – American chess grandmaster.
- Steve Geffrard – professional boxer.
- Alexander Ingram – professional polo player.
- Murray Jarman – professional basketball player.
- Josh Minott – NBA player.
- Corina Morariu – professional tennis player.
- Catalina Pérez – FIFA Women's World Cup goalkeeper (Colombia).
- Anthony Polite – professional basketball player.
- Morgan Pressel – LPGA golfer.
- Reid Rafter – professional tennis player.
- Vincent Spadea – professional tennis player.
- Conor Whipple – professional lacrosse player.
- Don Wilson – professional kickboxer and actor.
- Michael Yani – professional tennis player.
- Danny Young – MLB pitcher.

=== Business, science and public life ===
- Rick Bratman – CEO of ASA Entertainment.
- Eric Dent – ethicist, professor, and former college dean.
- Michael Farzan – virologist and immunologist; Fellow of the American Academy of Microbiology
- Chris Holzworth – decorated Marine Colonel and philanthropist.
- Julia Knight – CEO, Julia Knight Home Accessories.
- Daniel P. Reilly – Rhode Island attorney and politician.
- Cymonie Rowe – Florida circuit court judge.
- Natasha Sachs – executive director of Vanderbilt University's West Palm Beach campus.
- Gabriel Schillinger – entrepreneur; co-founder of For Darfur.
- Justin Siegel – producer for Universal Music Group.
- Kevin Steele – prosecutor in the Bill Cosby case.
- Adam Stewart – executive chairman of Sandals Resorts International.
- Martha Sugalski – NBC news anchor (Orlando).
- Zachary Sussman – co-founder of Mach9; named to the Forbes 30 Under 30 list (2026).
- Marcia Bratman Zaroff – founder and president of Under the Canopy fashions.

=== Arts and entertainment ===
- Beau Crangi – CFDA award-winning jewelry designer.
- Tinsley Ellis – blues musician.
- Kendra Erika – recording artist.
- John Posey – actor, writer, and playwright.
- Andy Rheingold – entertainment executive, producer, and writer.
- Ferris Smith – actor.
- Susan Strong – author.

== Finances ==
Saint Andrew's School has been tax-exempt as a 501(c)(3) organization since 1963. In its IRS Form 990 filing for the fiscal year ending June 2025, the school reported total revenue of $73.3 million against expenses of $62.7 million, for net income of approximately $10.6 million. It reported total assets of $182.3 million, total liabilities of $99.2 million, and net assets of $83.1 million. Program service revenue—chiefly tuition and fees—accounted for the large majority of total revenue, with contributions and investment income making up smaller shares.

The school's net assets grew substantially over the 2010s and 2020s, rising from about $11.6 million in the fiscal year ending June 2011 to $83.1 million by the fiscal year ending June 2025, a period that coincided with the campus master plan and associated capital fundraising.

== Sources ==
- Boca Magazine (January 1, 2012). "Getting to Know: Ann Marie Krejcarek". Boca Raton Magazine.
- Boca Raton Historical Society (February 2, 1981). "The Spanish River Papers, Vol. IX, No. 2" (PDF).
- Brigham Hill Consultancy (2018). "SAS Profile" (PDF). Archived (PDF) from the original on January 1, 2021.
- Cause IQ (2026). "Saint Andrew's School (SA)". Cause IQ. Nonprofit Metrics LLC.
- American Society for Microbiology (January 28, 2019). "109 Fellows Elected into the Academy" (Press release). American Society for Microbiology.
- Centerbrook Architects (2026). "Henderson Hall". Centerbrook Architects. Boca Raton, FL.
- Curreri, Gary (August 31, 2023). "Catalina Pérez Returns to Boca Roots". Sun Sentinel.
- Dusenbury, Wells (May 30, 2017). "Conor Whipple Chosen by Launch in Major League Lacrosse Draft". Sun Sentinel.
- Florida Council of Independent Schools (2016). "Independents Newsletter, Volume 04-16" (PDF). FCIS.
- Greenberg, Gary (February 13, 2020). "Hitting the Right Notes: Kendra Erika". Boca Magazine.
- Hartz-Seeley, Deborah (September 28, 2011). "Boca Raton: Notable St. Andrew's Grads". The Coastal Star.
- Keese, Parton (October 28, 1979). "Sailor in Quest for Olympic Gold". The New York Times.
- Koss-Feder, Laura (April 7, 2008). "Kids With a Conscience". Time.
- "Mach9". Forbes. Forbes Media LLC. January 1, 2026.
- McGarry, Carmen (December 1, 2021). "Herstory: Early Hillsboro Beach Resident Was Avon Executive With a Big Heart". New Pelican.
- Miami Dolphins (2014). 2014 Miami Dolphins Media Guide (PDF). Miami Dolphins.
- Miller, Toni-ann (July 5, 2010). "Steve Geffrard Aspires to 2012 U.S. Olympic Boxing Team". The Palm Beach Post. Archived from the original on January 9, 2024.
- Reid, Jane Musgrave (April 27, 2018). "DA Who Convicted Bill Cosby Got His Law Inspiration in West Palm Beach". Palm Beach Post. Archived from the original on July 23, 2019.
- Saint Andrew's School (2026). "About Saint Andrew's". Saint Andrew's School.
- Saint Andrew's School (2026). "Admission Inquiry Packet". Saint Andrew's School.
- Saint Andrew's School (September 15, 2025). "Celebrating 20 Years of Wight Hall – The Center for Performing Arts". Saint Andrew's School.
- Saint Andrew's School (2026). "Faculty Excellence". Saint Andrew's School.
- Saint Andrew's School (2026). "History & Episcopal Tradition". Saint Andrew's School.
- Saint Andrew's School. "History of SA". Saint Andrew's School.
- Saint Andrew's School (2026). "Lower School Students Observe Jewish High Holiday in Chickee Chapel". Saint Andrew's School.
- Saint Andrew's School (2026). "Lower School". Saint Andrew's School.
- Saint Andrew's School (2026). "Middle School". Saint Andrew's School.
- Saint Andrew's School (2026). "Upper School". Saint Andrew's School.
- Saint Andrew's School (September 29, 2025). "Saint Andrew's School Dedicates Charles and Hagerty Hall, A New Era of Learning Begins". Saint Andrew's School.
- Saint Andrew's School (2026). "Sporting Facilities". Saint Andrew's School.
- Sched LLC (2015). "Peter Benedict – MISBO/FISBO 2015 Business Officer Conference". Sched.com.
- Sheffield, Skip (August 24, 2010). "Ellis Back in Boca". Boca Raton Tribune.
- Smarr, Emilee (March 24, 2022). "Former St. Andrew's Star Josh Minott Declares for 2022 NBA Draft". The Palm Beach Post. Archived from the original on March 24, 2022.
- Swift, E. M. (August 8, 2005). "Make Way for Morgan". Sports Illustrated. Archived from the original on October 21, 2020.
- "TEDxSaintAndrewsSchoolYouth". TED. TED Conferences, LLC.
- Tomasson, Chris (July 19, 2013). "Dolphins' First Camp in 1966 Defined Team's Rough Beginning". FOX Sports.
- "Vanderbilt's West Palm Beach Campus Hits $400 Million". The Palm Beach Post. October 8, 2026.
- Wagner, Jodie (March 23, 2017). "St. Andrew's Anthony Polite: Small-Schools Basketball Player of the Year". The Palm Beach Post. Archived from the original on March 25, 2017.
- Wiren, Gary (2004). When Golf is a Ball: A Lifetime of Fun and Adventure in the Game. Clock Tower Press. p. 235. ISBN 978-1-93220217-5.
- "Adam Stewart". Florida International University. Florida International University. 2026.
- "Athletics Hall of Fame". Saint Andrew's School. Saint Andrew's School.
- "Athletics Success". Saint Andrew's School. Saint Andrew's School.
- "Bastian Selected for Olympic Games". Florida State University Athletics. Florida State University Athletics. June 28, 2021.
- "Boys' First Team". Sun Sentinel. May 23, 1990.
- "Church Appointments and Notices" (PDF). The Witness. June 28, 1962. p. 18.
- "Cognia Accreditation Registry". Cognia.
- "Danny Young – Atlanta Braves". OSDB Sports Database.
- "Episcopal Diocese of Southeast Florida". Episcopal Diocese of Southeast Florida. April 19, 2008.
- "Eric Dent". School Information Solution. December 1, 2017.
- "Generous Gifts Provide Financial Resources to Begin Renovation of Henderson Hall/Parker Library". Saint Andrew's School. Saint Andrew's School. January 13, 2020.
- "Jake Bargas, TE". Sun Sentinel. January 29, 2015.
- "Jake Bargas – Football". University of North Carolina Athletics. University of North Carolina Athletics.
- "Matt Bellando". Palm Beach Atlantic University Athletics. Palm Beach Atlantic University Athletics.
- "Membership Breakfast – January". Greater Boca Raton Chamber of Commerce. GrowthZone. January 8, 2026.
- "Michael Yani – Performance Timeline & Stats". db4tennis.com.
- "Paid Obituaries: Hunter Wyatt Brown Jr". Sun Sentinel. September 21, 2000.
- "Paper Lion (1968) – Filming & Production". IMDb.
- "Round Square International Conference: Waves of Change". Dhirubhai Ambani International School.
- "RS News – June 2013". Round Square. Round Square. June 20, 2013.
- "Saint Andrew's School". International Baccalaureate.
- "Saint Andrew's School". U.S. News & World Report. U.S. News & World Report. 2026.
- "Saint Andrew's School of Boca Raton Inc". ProPublica Nonprofit Explorer. ProPublica.
- "Saint Andrew's Alum Makes His Mark at Rolex 24 at Daytona". Saint Andrew's School. February 3, 2025.
- "School Directory: Saint Andrew's School". Florida Council of Independent Schools.
- "Serena Slater Marries Don Wilson in Oyster Bay". The New York Times. May 27, 1990.
- "So a Prince, a King and a Bunch of School Kids Walk Into Office Depot…". Sun Sentinel. October 8, 2013.
- "Student Activists Now Top-Notch Fundraisers". Sun Sentinel. May 6, 2008.
- "Swinging to Success: Corina Morariu, 12, Already a Champion". Sun Sentinel. January 18, 1991.
- "Teaching Business Ethics". Uncommon Friends Foundation. Uncommon Friends Foundation.
- "The Net (April 2006)" (PDF). Episcopal Diocese of Southeast Florida. Archived from the original (PDF) on May 14, 2006.
- "Saint Andrew's School ad" (PDF). The Living Church. 147 (14). Living Church Foundation: 20. October 6, 1963.
- "Saint Andrew's School ad" (PDF). The Living Church. 163 (19). Living Church Foundation: 19. November 7, 1971.
- "Saint Andrew's School ad" (PDF). The Living Church. 162 (16). Living Church Foundation: 20. April 18, 1971.
- "World-Renowned Johns Hopkins Program Expands to South Florida". Business Development Board of Palm Beach County. December 2025.
- Chaves, Misty (2020). "Judge Cymonie Rowe" (PDF). Palm Beach County Bar Association Bulletin.
