= Raise the Bar =

2013 single by Bonnie Anderson

Single by Bonnie Anderson
- Released: November 8, 2013
- Genre: Pop
- Length: 3:18
- Label: Sony Music Australia
- Songwriters: Bonnie Anderson; Anthony Egizii; David Musumeci
- Producer: DNA Songs

Bonnie Anderson singles chronology
"Gonna Make You Sweat" (2012)	"Raise the Bar" (2013)	"Blackout" (2014)

Music video
- "Raise the Bar" on YouTube

"Raise the Bar" is a song performed by Australian pop singer Bonnie Anderson and written by Anderson and songwriting duo DNA Songs. The song was released in November 8, 2013 as Anderson's debut solo single. It peaked at number 55 on the ARIA Charts in December 2013.

Upon release Anderson said "What I love about 'Raise the Bar' is that it's fun, a bit cheeky, doesn't take itself too seriously, yet still has that cool edge."

== Music video ==
The music video for "Raise the Bar" was released on 19 November 2013 and uploaded onto YouTube three days later.

== Track listing ==
Digital single

1. "Raise the Bar" - 3:18

Digital single (Special Edition)

1. "Raise the Bar" - 3:18
2. "Empire State of Mind" (acoustic) - 4:15

== Charts ==
Chart (2013)	Peak position
Australia (ARIA)	55

== Release history ==
Region	Release date	Format	Label	Catalogue
Australia	8 November 2013	Digital download	Sony Music Australia	G010003060315B
Australia	20 December 2013	Digital download (Special edition)	Sony Music Australia	
