= Unbroken (Bonnie Anderson song) =

Single by Bonnie Anderson
- Released: July 24, 2015
- Genre: Pop
- Length: 3:47
- Label: Sony Music Australia
- Songwriter(s): Bonnie Anderson; Bhavik Pattani; Sidnie Tipton; Rune Westberg
- Producer(s): Matt Radosevich

Bonnie Anderson singles chronology
"Rodeo" (2014)	"Unbroken" (2015)	"The Ones I Love" (2016)

"Unbroken" is a song by Australian pop singer Bonnie Anderson and was released in July 2015. It peaked at number 63 on the ARIA Charts.

Upon release Anderson said "Everyone can relate to life being difficult at times. We've all been through this. Sometimes impossible situations can make you feel like there's no light at the end of the tunnel. It's what you do or how you handle yourself in these circumstances that can really bring you out of the dark. 'Unbroken' helps the listener to realise they aren't alone in their suffering."

== Track listing ==
Digital single

1. "Unbroken" - 3:47

CD single

1. "Unbroken" - 3:47
2. "Unbroken" (acoustic) - 4:00

Digital single (acoustic)

1. "Unbroken" (acoustic) - 4:00

== Charts ==
Chart (2015)	Position
Australia (ARIA)	63

== Release history ==
Region	Release Date	Format	Label	Catalogue
Australia	24 July 2015	Digital download / CD Single	Sony Music Australia	88875122392
Australia	4 September 2015	Digital download (acoustic)	Sony Music Australia	
