= The Ones I Love =

2016 song

Single by Bonnie Anderson
- Released: 19 February 2016
- Length: 3:20
- Label: Sony Music Australia
- Songwriter(s): Bonnie Anderson; Michael DeLorenzis; Michael Paynter

Bonnie Anderson singles chronology
"Unbroken" (2015)	"The Ones I Love" (2016)	"Sorry" (2019)

Music video
- "The Ones I Love" on YouTube

"The Ones I Love" is a song by Australian pop singer Bonnie Anderson and was released on 19 February 2016. The song became her first to enter the Billboard Dance Club Songs chart, peaking at number 43.

Upon release Anderson said "'The Ones I Love' came from a dream I had...Dreams often trigger stories and songs for me to write about. This one in particular really shook me up, it felt so real! Losing someone you love would be the hardest thing to go through, it even hurts in your dreams, which made me realise how important it is to spend time with my loved ones. This song means so much to me and I hope it resonates with others as well. I can't wait for everyone to hear it."

== Music video ==
The music video for "The Ones I Love" was released on 26 February 2016.

== Track listing ==
Digital single

1. "The Ones I Love" - 3:20

Digital single (remixes)

1. "The Ones I Love" (radio edit) - 3:20
2. "The Ones I Love" (DASCO Club remix) - 6:26
3. "The Ones I Love" (Soulshaker remix) - 6:24
4. "The Ones I Love" (Diamm remix) - 6:05
5. "The Ones I Love" (Alinari remix) - 5:08

== Charts ==
Chart (2016)	Peak position
Australia (ARIA)	160
US Dance Club Songs (Billboard)	43

== Release history ==
Region	Release Date	Format	Label	Catalogue
Australia	19 February 2016	Digital download	Sony Music Australia	88985303232
Australia	13 May 2016	Digital download	Sony Music Australia	
United States	15 July 2016	Digital download	Starlight Records	STAR046
