= Who I AM (Abraham Mateo album) =

Studio album by Abraham Mateo
- Released: November 3, 2014
- Recorded: July 2014
- Genre: Pop
- Length: 42:21
- Label: Sony Music
- Producer: Jacobo Calderón

Abraham Mateo chronology
AM (2013)	Who I AM (2014)	Are You Ready? (2015)

Alternate cover
- The slipcover for the 2015 Special Edition of the album.

Singles from Who I AM
- 1. "All The Girls" Released: September 23, 2014; 2. "Another Heartbreak" Released: June 9, 2015; 3. "Todo Terminó" Released: July 24, 2015

Who I AM is the third studio album by Spanish pop music artist Abraham Mateo. The album was released on November 3, 2014, through Sony Music Spain. Who I Am peaked at number one in Mexico and Spain and was certified Platinum by Promusicae.

In May 2014, Mateo traveled to Los Angeles, California with his producer Jacobo Calderón to work on his third studio album. In L.A. he had writing sessions with Damon Sharpe, Lauren Christy, Andre Merritt and other songwriters. In July 2014, Mateo announced the name of his new album, Who I AM, and the release date (Autumn 2014). The album was produced in Madrid and mixed in Los Angeles. It contains broken beats, a funk vibe futuristic beats and organic arrangements.

The first single and album's opening track "All The Girls", written by Lauren Christy, Jacobo Calderón and Mateo himself, was released alongside the pre-order of the album on iTunes on September 23, 2014. "All The Girls" peaked at number 9 on the Spain's Top 50 singles chart.

Who I AM Hardback Book Edition includes three Bonus Tracks (#13, #14, #15) and a DVD with a documentary, featuring unreleased footage from his tour around Latin America and Spain in 2014 and from the studio in Los Angeles while he recorded the album. Who I AM was sold on iTunes including also the bonus track "Zero fahrenheit".

A Special Edition of Who I AM was released on June 22, 2015. It includes a CD with six Bonus Tracks and a DVD with live performances featuring Spanish groups Dvicio, Critika & Saik and Lerica.

== Track listing ==
No.	Title	Writer(s)	Length
1.	"All the Girls (La La La)"	Abraham Mateo; Jacobo Calderón; Lauren Christy; Alexander Pantchenko	3:06
2.	"Eres Como el Aire"	Abraham Mateo; Jacobo Calderón; Andre Merritt; Daecolm Holland
3.	"Todo Terminó"	Abraham Mateo; Jacobo Calderón; Timothy Zimnoch Music; Charles Stephens III; Jason Dmuchowski; Carlos Battey; Steven Battey
4.	"Torture"	Eric McCarthy; David Kaneswaran; Dario Darnell	3:36
5.	"Mi Circo"	Abraham Mateo; Jacobo Calderón; Andre Merritt; Donald Sales	4:03
6.	"Another Heartbreak"	Jacobo Calderón; John Reid; Lukas Nathanson; Scott Effman; Samuel Jean	4:48
7.	"It's You"	Abraham Mateo; Jacobo Calderón; Damon Sharpe; Eric Sanicola; Jordan Palmer	3:15
8.	"Fue un Error Amarte"	Abraham Mateo; Jacobo Calderón; Damon Sharpe; Eric Sanicola	3:23
9.	"I Choose That Girl"	Abraham Mateo; Jacobo Calderón; Jeannie Lurie	3:11
10.	"Golden Heart"	Abraham Mateo; Jacobo Calderón	3:27
11.	"Who I Am"	Abraham Mateo; Jacobo Calderón; Thomas Troelsen; Herbie Crichlow	3:14
12.	"Hearts"	Abraham Mateo; Jacobo Calderón; Jovan and Javier Barreto; Nelson Alexander Kyle; Michael Molina; Jonathan Paul Callender II; Jeremy Randolph Thurber; Aurora Pfelffer	3:24

Hardback Book Edition bonus tracks
No.	Title	Writer(s)	Length
13.	"Adicto a Ti (Adicct 4 Da)"	Abraham Mateo; Jacobo Calderón; Andre Merritt; Donald Sales	3:34
14.	"Baby Girl"	Jacobo Calderón; John Reid; Craig Hardy	2:51
15.	"Niña Indeterminada"	Abraham Mateo; Jacobo Calderón; Craig Hardy; John Reid	3:34

iTunes Edition bonus tracks
No.	Title	Writer(s)	Length
13.	"Adicto a Ti (Adicct 4 Da)"	Abraham Mateo; Jacobo Calderón; Andre Merritt; Donald Sales	3:34
14.	"Baby Girl"	Jacobo Calderón; John Reid; Craig Hardy	2:51
15.	"Niña Indeterminada"	Abraham Mateo; Jacobo Calderón; Craig Hardy; John Reid	3:34
16.	"Zero Fahrenheit"	Abraham Mateo; Jacobo Calderón; Alexander Pantchenko	3:13

Brazil Edition bonus tracks
No.	Title	Writer(s)	Length
13.	"Señorita"	Herbie Crichlow; Jacobo Calderón; Thomas Troelsen	3:23
14.	"Girlfriend"	Charlie Mason; Gabriel Wärmby; Jacobo Calderón; Jani Kristian Hölli; Mans Ek	3:36
15.	"Lánzalo"	Abraham Mateo; Jacobo Calderón; Juan Mari Montes	4:02
16.	"All The Girls (La La La) - English Version"	Abraham Mateo; Jacobo Calderón; Lauren Christy; Alexander Pantchenko	3:11

CD+DVD Special Edition (CD, bonus tracks)
No.	Title	Writer(s)	Length
13.	"Adicto a Ti (Adicct 4 Da)"	Abraham Mateo; Jacobo Calderón; Andre Merritt; Donald Sales	3:34
14.	"Baby Girl"	Jacobo Calderón; John Reid; Craig Hardy	2:51
15.	"Niña Indeterminada"	Abraham Mateo; Jacobo Calderón; Craig Hardy; John Reid	3:34
16.	"Zero Fahrenheit"	Abraham Mateo; Jacobo Calderón; Alexander Pantchenko	3:13
17.	"Sin usar palabras" (Lodovica Comello featuring Abraham Mateo)	Lodovica Comello; Fabio Serri; Daniele Luppino	3:34
18.	"La Puerta Hacia el Amor (B.S.O FROZEN)"	Kristen Anderson-Lopez; Robert Lopez	2:09

CD+DVD Special Edition (DVD, Concierto Acústico Entre Amigos)
No.	Title	Writer(s)	Length
1.	"Golden Heart" (featuring Lérica)	Abraham Mateo; Jacobo Calderón
2.	"Another Heartbreak" (featuring Dvicio)	Jacobo Calderón; John Reid; Lukas Nathanson; Scott Effman; Samuel Jean
3.	"Enamórate" (Dvicio featuring Abraham Mateo)	Andres Ceballos
4.	"Lánzalo" (featuring Critika & Saik)	Abraham Mateo; Jacobo Calderón; Juan Mari Montes
5.	"Imposible Olvidar" (Critika & Saik featuring Abraham Mateo)	Sergio Bello; Miguel González; Agustín Sarasa
6.	"Body Language"	Abraham Mateo; Jacobo Calderón; Jeannie Lurie; Matthew Puckett
7.	"Eres Como el Aire"	Abraham Mateo; Jacobo Calderón; Andre Merritt; Daecolm Holland
8.	"It's U"	Abraham Mateo; Jacobo Calderón; Damon Sharpe; Eric Sanicola; Jordan Palmer

iTunes Special Edition (bonus tracks)
No.	Title	Writer(s)	Length
13.	"Adicto a Ti (Adicct 4 Da)"	Abraham Mateo; Jacobo Calderón; Andre Merritt; Donald Sales	3:34
14.	"Baby Girl"	Jacobo Calderón; John Reid; Craig Hardy	2:51
15.	"Niña Indeterminada"	Abraham Mateo; Jacobo Calderón; Craig Hardy; John Reid	3:34
16.	"Zero Fahrenheit"	Abraham Mateo; Jacobo Calderón; Alexander Pantchenko	3:13
17.	"Sin usar palabras" (Lodovica Comello featuring Abraham Mateo)	Lodovica Comello; Fabio Serri; Daniele Luppino	3:34
18.	"La Puerta Hacia el Amor (B.S.O FROZEN)"	Kristen Anderson-Lopez; Robert Lopez	2:09
19.	"Body Language (Acústico Entre Amigos)"	Abraham Mateo; Jacobo Calderón; Jeannie Lurie; Matthew Puckett	2:43
20.	"Eres Como el Aire (Acústico Entre Amigos)"	Abraham Mateo; Jacobo Calderón; Andre Merritt; Daecolm Holland	3:27
21.	"It's U (Acústico Entre Amigos)"	Abraham Mateo; Jacobo Calderón; Damon Sharpe; Eric Sanicola; Jordan Palmer	3:51

== Charts ==
=== Weekly charts ===
Chart (2014)	Peak position
Spain PROMUSICAE	1
Mexico AMPROFON	1

=== Year-end charts ===
Chart (2014)	Position
Spanish Albums (PROMUSICAE)	38

Chart (2015)	Position
Spanish Albums (PROMUSICAE)	34

=== Singles ===
Year	Single	Peak chart positions
Year	Single	SPA
2014	All The Girls	9

== Certifications ==
Region	Certification	Certified units/sales
Spain (PROMUSICAE)	Platinum	40,000^{‡}
^{‡} Sales+streaming figures based on certification alone.
