= Anthony Polite =

Swiss basketball player

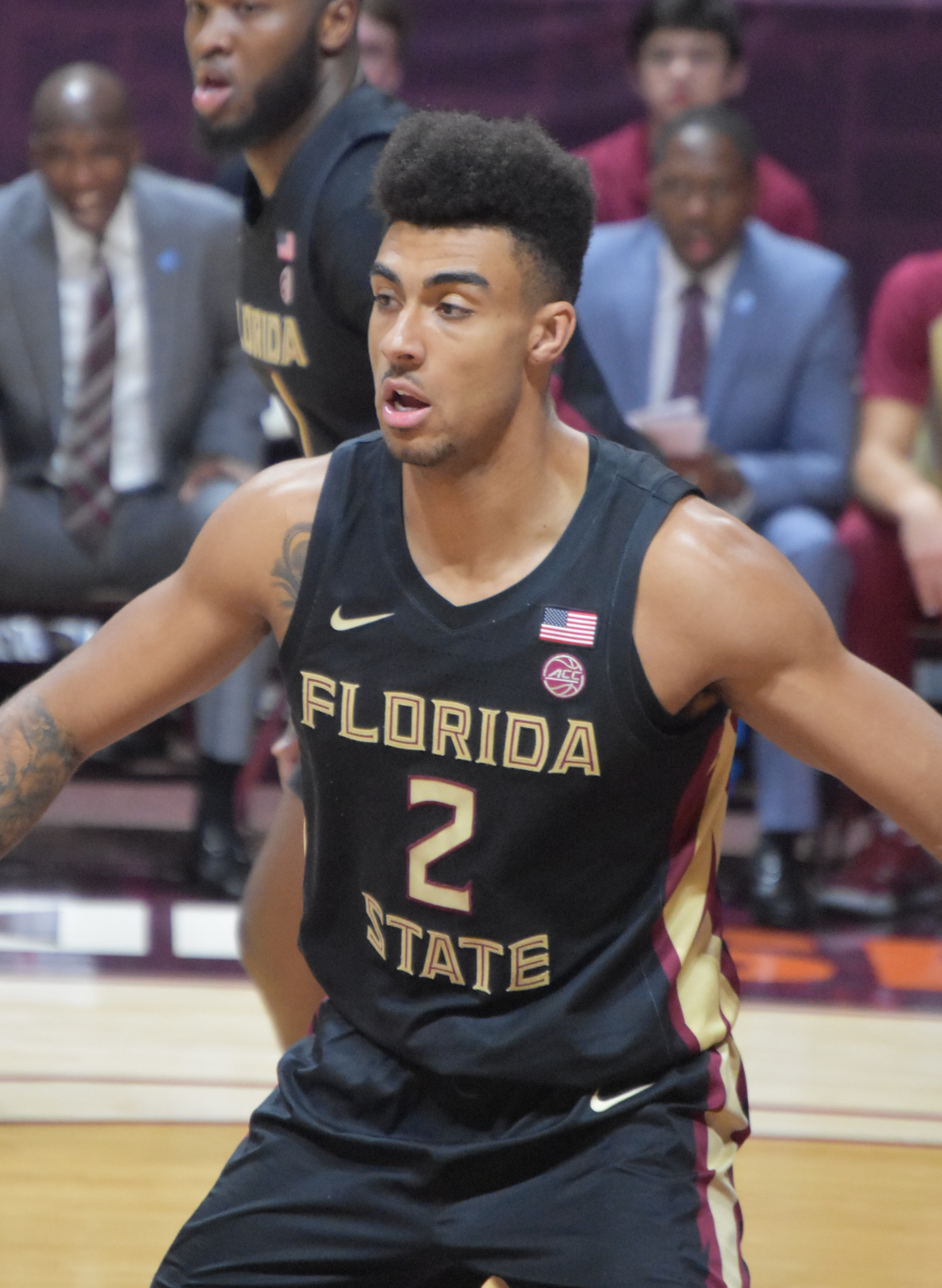
- Polite with Florida State in 2020

No. 8 – Phoenix Hagen
- Position: Small forward
- League: Basketball Bundesliga

Personal information
- Born: 21 June 1997 (age 29) Lugano, Switzerland
- Listed height: 1.98 m (6 ft 6 in)
- Listed weight: 97 kg (214 lb)

Career information
- High school: Saint Andrew's School (Boca Raton, Florida)
- College: Florida State (2017–2022)
- NBA draft: 2022: undrafted
- Playing career: 2022–present

Career history
- 2022–2023: ASVEL
- 2023: Hamburg Towers
- 2023–2024: Río Breogán
- 2024–2026: Did not play
- 2026–present: Phoenix Hagen

Anthony Michael Lewis Polite (born 21 June 1997) is a Swiss professional basketball player for the Phoenix Hagen of the Basketball Bundesliga (BBL). He played college basketball for the Florida State Seminoles.

== Early life ==
Polite was born in Lugano, Switzerland, where his father was playing basketball professionally. He grew up playing football and basketball. He moved to the United States to attend high school at Saint Andrew's School in Boca Raton, Florida. As a senior, Polite averaged 20 points and 11.7 rebounds per game, earning All-Palm Beach 6A-1A Player of the Year honors for a second straight year. He committed to playing college basketball for Florida State over an offer from Miami (Florida), among others.

== College career ==
Polite redshirted his first season at Florida State due to knee injuries. As a freshman, he averaged 2.7 points per game. Polite averaged 5.8 points in his sophomore season. On 22 March 2021, he scored a career-high 22 points in a 71–53 win over Colorado at the second round of the NCAA tournament. As a junior, Polite averaged 10.1 points and 4.5 rebounds per game, shooting 43.6 percent from three-point range.

On 5 April 2022, Polite declared for the 2022 NBA draft, forgoing his remaining college eligibility.

== Professional career ==
On July 13, 2022, he has signed with ASVEL of the French LNB Pro A.

On January 14, 2023, he signed with Hamburg Towers of the German Basketball Bundesliga.

On June 20, 2023, he signed with CB Breogán of the Spanish Liga ACB and Basketball Champions League.

On June 19, 2024, Polite signed with Fukushima Firebonds of the Japanese B.League. On August 23, 2024, his contract was terminated due to being diagnosed with a torn anterior cruciate ligament.

On July 30, 2026, he signed with Phoenix Hagen of the German Basketball Bundesliga (BBL).

== National team career ==
Polite represented Switzerland at the 2015 FIBA Europe Under-18 Championship Division B and the 2013 FIBA Europe Under-16 Championship Division B.

== Career statistics ==
Legend
GP	Games played	GS	Games started	MPG	Minutes per game
FG%	Field goal percentage	3P%	3-point field goal percentage	FT%	Free throw percentage
RPG	Rebounds per game	APG	Assists per game	SPG	Steals per game
BPG	Blocks per game	PPG	Points per game	**Bold**	Career high

=== College ===
Year	Team	GP	GS	MPG	FG%	3P%	FT%	RPG	APG	SPG	BPG	PPG
2017–18	Florida State	1	0	4.0	–	–	–	1.0	1.0	1.0	.0	.0
2018–19	Florida State	30	0	10.6	.382	.239	.773	1.6	.6	.6	.0	2.7
2019–20	Florida State	**31**	8	19.7	.406	.354	.679	2.9	1.1	1.2	.2	5.8
2020–21	Florida State	21	16	26.6	**.500**	**.436**	.667	4.5	1.8	1.4	.4	**10.1**
2021–22	Florida State	24	**24**	**27.9**	.429	.321	**.800**	**5.6**	**2.5**	**1.5**	**.5**	9.9
Career		107	48	20.2	.436	.349	.741	3.4	1.4	1.1	.3	6.6

== Personal life ==
Polite's father, Michael, played college basketball for Florida State before embarking on a professional career in Europe.
