= Are You Ready? (Abraham Mateo album) =

Studio album by Abraham Mateo
- Released: November 13, 2015
- Genres: Latin pop, Pop, R&B
- Length: 45:05
- Label: Sony Spain
- Producer: Jacobo Calderon

Abraham Mateo chronology
Who I AM (2014)	Are You Ready? (2015)

Alternate cover
- The slipcover for the 2016 Special Edition of the album.

Singles from Are You Ready?
- 1. "Old School" Released: September 25, 2015; 2. "Are You Ready?" Released: January 29, 2016; 3. "Así Es Tu Amor" Released: March 4, 2016; 4. "When You Love Somebody" Released: July 24, 2016

Singles from Are You Ready? (Special Edition)
- 1. "Mueve" Released: September 23, 2016; 2. "Mi Vecina" Released: November 29, 2016

Are You Ready? is the fourth studio album by Spanish singer Abraham Mateo. It was released on 13 November 2015, through Sony Music. The album peaked at number 3 in Spain and at number 7 in Mexico. In Spain, a Deluxe Edition was released in digibook (hardback book), including three Bonus Tracks, a poster, and 24 pages with exclusive photos.

A 2-CD special edition of the album was released on October 7, 2016 containing ten bonus tracks. It includes the singles "Mueve", featuring Argentinian singer Lali, and the ballad "Mi Vecina".

== Track listing ==
No.	Title	Writer(s)	Length
1.	"Are You Ready?"	Abraham Mateo; Jacobo Calderon; Talay Riley; Brandon Salaam Bailey	3:30
2.	"Old School"	Victor Thell; Kevin Högdahl; Jonannes Henriksson; Richard Andersson	3:10
3.	"If I Can't Have You"	Abraham Mateo; Jacobo Calderon; Lindy Robbins; Allan Grigg; Saul Alexander Castillo Vasquez	3:45
4.	"A Place In My Heart"	Abraham Mateo; Jacobo Calderon; Jason “Poo Bear” Boyd; Joshua Gudwin; Adrian Wat	3:33
5.	"When You Love Somebody"	Abraham Mateo; Jacobo Calderon; Lindy Robbins; Allan Grigg; Saul Alexander Castillo Vasquez	3:31
6.	"I’m Feeling So Good" (featuring CD9)	Abraham Mateo; Jacobo Calderon; Damon Sharpe; Eric Sanicola	3:27
7.	"Like an Animal"	Abraham Mateo; Jacobo Calderon; Julian Emery	3:56
8.	"Así es tu amor"	Abraham Mateo; Jacobo Calderon; Juan Guevara	3:40
9.	"Guilty Pleasure"	Abraham Mateo; Jacobo Calderon; Alexander Pantchenko; Jeannie Lurie	3:21
10.	"Loving an Angel"	Abraham Mateo; Jacobo Calderon; Jörgen Elofsson	3:17
11.	"TDMC (Te daré mi corazón)"	Abraham Mateo; Jacobo Calderon; Alexander Pantchenko	3:35
12.	"Mueve"	Abraham Mateo; Jacobo Calderon; Daniel Ruiz; Talay Riley; Brandon Salaam Bailey	3:07
Total length:			45:05

Deluxe Edition bonus tracks
No.	Title	Writer(s)	Length
13.	"Old School (David Van Bylen Remix)"	Victor Thell; Kevin Högdahl; Jonannes Henriksson; Richard Andersson	3:16
14.	"Homeless"	Abraham Mateo; Jacobo Calderon; Alexander Pantchenko	3:11
15.	"No Habrá Mañana"	Abraham Mateo; Jacobo Calderon; Alexander Pantchenko	3:19

Brazil Edition bonus tracks
No.	Title	Writer(s)	Length
13.	"Old School (Spanish Version)"	Victor Thell; Kevin Högdahl; Jonannes Henriksson; Richard Andersson	3:10

Special Edition bonus tracks
No.	Title	Writer(s)	Length
13.	"Mi Vecina"	Abraham Mateo	4:04
14.	"Temblando En La Oscuridad"	Abraham Mateo; Jacobo Calderon; Cecy Leos	3:26
15.	"Homeless"	Abraham Mateo; Jacobo Calderon; Alexander Pantchenko	3:07
16.	"No Habrá Mañana"	Abraham Mateo; Jacobo Calderon; Alexander Pantchenko	3:14
17.	"Mueve" (featuring Lali)	Abraham Mateo; Jacobo Calderon; Daniel Ruiz; Talay Riley; Brandon Salaam Bailey	3:08
18.	"Quisiera (Ballad Version)" (CNCO featuring Abraham Mateo)	Victor Delgado; Juan Luis Londoño; Juan Luis Morera	3:08
19.	"A Place in My Heart (Papier Remix)"	Abraham Mateo; Jacobo Calderon; Jason “Poo Bear” Boyd; Joshua Gudwin; Adrian Wat	3:36
20.	"Old School (David Van Bylen Remix)"	Victor Thell; Kevin Högdahl; Jonannes Henriksson; Richard Andersson	3:16
21.	"When You Love Somebody (Spanish Version)"	Abraham Mateo; Jacobo Calderon; Alexander Pantchenko	3:31
22.	"Old School (Spanish Version)"	Victor Thell; Kevin Högdahl; Jonannes Henriksson; Richard Andersson	3:12

== Charts ==
=== Weekly charts ===
Chart (2015–16)	Peak position
Mexican Albums (AMPROFON)	7
Spanish Albums (Promusicae)	3

=== Year-end charts ===
Chart (2015)	Position
Spanish Albums (PROMUSICAE)	41

Chart (2016)	Position
Spanish Albums (PROMUSICAE)	55

== Certifications ==
Region	Certification	Certified units/sales
Spain (Promusicae)	Gold	20,000^{‡}
^{‡} Sales+streaming figures based on certification alone.
