= Euphoria (The Perry Twins song) =

Single by The Perry Twins featuring Harper Starling
- Released: February 28, 2018
- Recorded: 2018
- Genre: Dance-pop, Electro House
- Length: 4:27
- Label: Tanman Recordings
- Songwriter(s): Harper Starling; Doug Perry; Derek Perry
- Producer(s): Doug Perry; Derek Perry

The Perry Twins singles chronology
| "Bad Bad Boy" (2009) | "Euphoria" (2018) |

"Euphoria" is a song recorded, co-written, and produced by the American sibling duo The Perry Twins featuring American singer/actress Harper Starling. The single reached number one on Billboard's Dance Club Songs chart in its June 9, 2018 issue, giving the Rhode Island-born brothers their second number one, and Starling her first.

== Track listing ==
Digital download

1. Euphoria (Perry Twins Original Mix) 4:27
2. Euphoria (Perry Twins Club Mix) 6:18
3. Euphoria (Perry Twins Original Extended Mix) 5:50
4. Euphoria (Dan Thomas Remix) 6:00
5. Euphoria (Dan Thomas Radio Edit) 3:42
6. Euphoria (Dan Thomas Instrumental) 6:00
7. Euphoria (Dirty Werk Remix) 3:30
8. Euphoria (Dirty Werk Extended Remix) 4:29
