= Gabriel Schillinger =

American entrepreneur

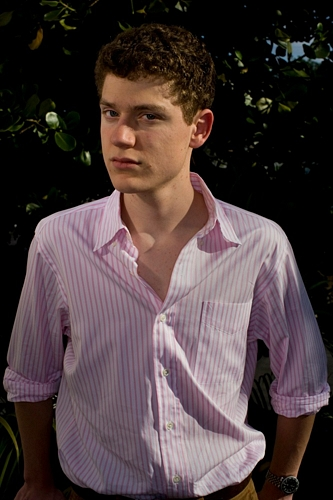
- Schillinger in 2009
- Born: July 21, 1989 (age 37); Palm Beach, FL
- Education: Saint Andrew's School, Babson College, and New York University
- Occupation: Entrepreneur
- Known for: Co-founder BIM Networks, Co-founder and CEO Gamma
- Spouse: Anastasiia Sapozhnikova (m. 2021)

Gabriel Schillinger (born July 21, 1989) is an American entrepreneur from Delray Beach, Florida. He was the co-founder and executive director of For Darfur. In 2009 he founded Decade Worldwide and BIM Networks. He worked with Lars Rasmussen, the visionary co-creator of Google Maps, at Weav Music. In July 2017, he co-founded. Gamma Innovations was acquired by Animoca Brands in July 2019.

== Early life and education ==
Schillinger was born on July 21, 1989, in Delray Beach, Florida. His mother, Mary Lou Schillinger, worked as an occupational therapist. His father Brent Schillinger, is a Board Certified Dermatologist in Palm Beach County, Florida.

He attended Saint Andrew's School in Boca Raton. At the age of 16, Schillinger co-founded For Darfur. He spent his summers traveling South America learning Spanish. Schillinger attended Babson College and New York University.

== For Darfur ==
Schillinger produced and promoted Kanye West's Glow in The Dark Tour at the AmericanAirlines Arena in Miami, Florida. The concert was an awareness and fundraising show. The concert was a success with a sellout crowd of 12,000 people and raised over $1,000,000 that went directly to Doctors Without Borders efforts in Darfur.

== Career ==
=== Decade Worldwide ===
Schillinger co-founded Decade Worldwide. Schillinger was instrumental in pioneering the concept of a mixtape portal, allowing artists to release their mixtapes through a central branded website. Past releases for Decade, under Schillinger's leadership, include Wale's More About Nothing Mixtape and Diggy Simmons early mixtapes in 2009 and 2010.

=== BIM Networks ===
Schillinger co-founded Buy It Mobility Networks, Inc in 2009, with Benjamin Bronfman. Edgar Bronfman Jr. is the Chairman on the company and board members include Robert Nardelli, Stephen Sadove, Tom Neff, Arthur Martinez. BIM is mobile payments platform that offers a decoupled debit and rewards product to quick service retailers and gas stations. Schillinger successfully sold his stake and exited BIM in 2013. BIM currently has major United States gas stations as partners including Philip's 76

=== Weav ===
Schillinger worked with Lars Rasmussen for the launch of Weav Music in 2016 and was an advisor to Weav until June 2017. Weav is an adaptive music technology app that automatically matches songs to users cadence while running. Schillinger helped bring investors and partners to Weav, opening up the company to the music and sports industries.

=== Gamma Innovations ===
Schillinger co-founded Gamma Innovations with Samuel Snyder and Zhi Huang in July 2017. Gamma's investors included David Helgason, Mark Pincus, Greycroft, Lars Rasmussen, Gree, Razer and others. Gamma launched GammaNow a distributed compute application inspired by SETI@home in February 2018. Gamma announced on December 2, 2018, a strategic partnership with Razer to release Softminer, a white labeled version of GammaNow, to the Razer community globally. Gamma has users in over forty countries. It was announced in July 2019, that Gamma would be acquired by Animoca Brands.

=== PowerUp Acquisition Corp. ===
Schillinger was President of PowerUp Acquisition Corp., a Special-purpose acquisition company (SPAC), focused on the global video games industry. PowerUp raised $287 million via an initial public offering on the Nasdaq on Feb 18th, 2022. Schillinger started PowerUp with Jack Tretton, the former President and CEO of Sony Computer Entertainment America (SCEA) and Bruce Hack, the former Vice Chairman of the Board of Activision Blizzard and CEO of Vivendi Games. SRIRAMA Associates acquired a majority interest in PowerUp Acquisition Corp. on July 14, 2023.

== Personal life ==
Schillinger married Anastasiia Sapozhnikova, a Russian born fashion model, in 2021.
