= The Scheme (band) =

British pop band

- Genre: Pop music
- Label: DP Music Limited
- Members: Kristofer James; Kyle Carpenter; Aleksey Lopez
- Website: www.thescheme.com

The Scheme is a pop band based in London.

The Scheme made up of Kris James, Kyle Carpenter and Aleksey Lopez formed in early 2015, shortly after the two founding members James and Carpenter returned from a two year writing journey in Berlin. This trio have accomplished impressive things so far including headlining the half-time show at a Predators home game in Florida's Amway Centre and performing on Good Day Orlando. After releasing their first EP Jerome Heights, the band toured with The Tide, Union J, Lemar and Ryan Lawrie.

In 2016, The Scheme released their first EP, Jerome Heights, recorded at Tileyard and produced by Soren Anderson.

== Discography ==
- "Dust" - Single - 2015
- "Jordan's Smile" - Charity Single - 2015
- Jerome Heights - EP - 2016
