= Blackout (Bonnie Anderson song) =

Single by Bonnie Anderson
- Released: June 13, 2014
- Studio: Jim Henson Studios
- Genre: Pop
- Length: 3:03
- Label: Sony Music Australia
- Songwriters: Bonnie Anderson; Eric Sanicola; Johnny Powers Severin; Ameerah A. Roelants
- Producers: Eric Sanicola; Johnny Powers Severin

Bonnie Anderson singles chronology
"Raise the Bar" (2013)	"Blackout" (2014)	"Rodeo" (2014)

Music video
- "Blackout" on YouTube

"Blackout" is a song by Australian pop singer Bonnie Anderson and was released in June 2014. The song is about acting on your strongest desires and came out of a collaboration between Anderson and RedOne during a recent writing trip to Los Angeles. It peaked at number 24 on the ARIA Charts and was certified gold.

Anderson said "'Blackout' came from a conversation we were having about boys... hot boys! It is about a desperate desire and wanting something so badly and so passionately, you just have to have it now! The 'blackout' is that intense secret moment between you and that person, and nothing else matters."

The song has been sampled a number of times, most notably in the Karol G hit "Mi Cama", which reached the top 5 on the Spanish Promusicae charts.

== Music video ==
The music video for "Blackout" was directed by Christopher Frey and released on 6 June 2014.

== Track listing ==
Digital single

1. "Blackout" - 3:05

CD single

1. "Blackout" - 3:03
2. "Blackout" (Johnny Labs & Statik Link Trap Club Mix) - 3:05
3. "Blackout" (ATP Remix) - 3:31
4. "Blackout" (Bexta Club Mix) - 3:28
5. "Blackout" (acoustic) - 3:25

Digital single

1. "Blackout" Marcus Santoro remix - 5:39

== Charts ==
=== Weekly charts ===
Chart (2014)	Peak position
Australia (ARIA)	24

=== Year-end charts ===
Chart (2014)	Position
Australian Artist (ARIA)	37

== Certifications ==
Region	Certification	Certified units/sales
Australia (ARIA)	Gold	35,000^{^}
^{^} Shipments figures based on certification alone.

== Release history ==
Region	Release Date	Format	Label	Catalogue
Australia	13 June 2014	Digital download	Sony Music Australia	G010003168156N
Australia	27 June 2014	CD single	Sony Music Australia	88843078602
Australia	29 August 2014	Digital download (Special edition)	Sony Music Australia	
