= Raphael Tate =

American singer-songwriter

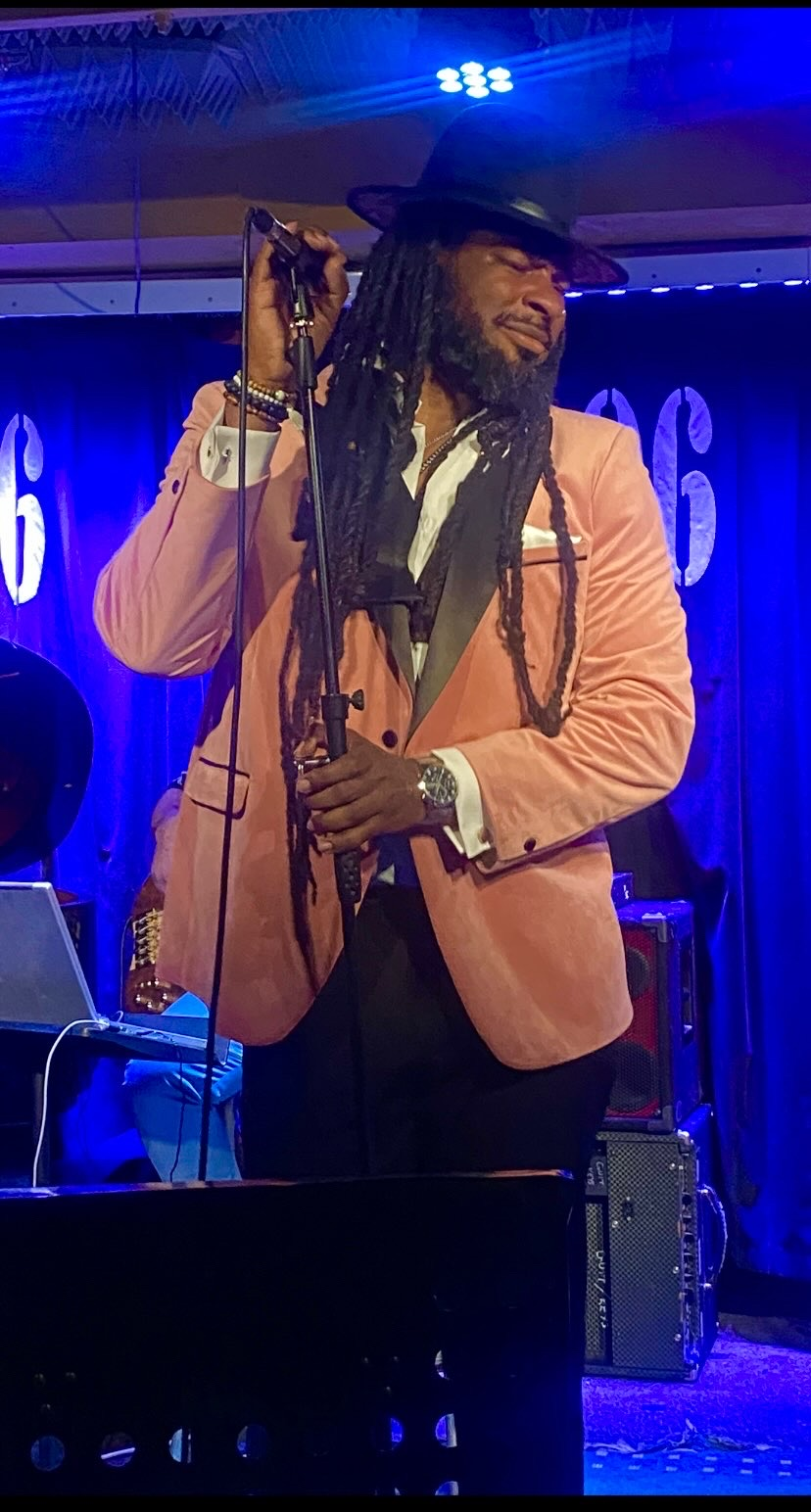
- Raphael in 2024

Background information
- Also known as: Raphael Prince of Soul, Raphael, Raphael Starstruck
- Born: Raphael Orlando Tate; February 18, 1984 (age 42); Prince George's County, Maryland, U.S.
- Genres: Contemporary gospel; R&B; funk; soul; reggae; pop; EDM
- Instruments: Vocals; tuba; percussion; piano
- Labels: Dauman Music, Tate Love Music

Raphael Orlando Tate (born February 18, 1984) is an American singer, songwriter, dancer, and record producer. His debut single "With Every Beat of My Heart" (released in late 2017) peaked at number 25 on Billboard's Dance Club Songs chart. Tate appeared in the second series of the ITVX primetime show Starstruck (2023). In episode 6, Tate delivered a tribute to James Brown, accompanied by teammates Ron Davis and gospel singer Emmanuel Smith. The series was described by some media outlets as a revived and reformatted version of Stars in Their Eyes.

== Early life ==
Tate grew up in Prince George's County, Maryland with 10 siblings. He was inspired early on by his father Robert and his mother Patricia who led worship services in their local network of churches. His father also played saxophone and had sung professionally for R&B groups.

Tate attended Crossland High School. He accepted a music scholarship to attend Morgan State University in Baltimore County, Maryland. During this period, he was featured in film Head of State, performing with a brass band. After college, Tate travelled, and eventually settled in Cyprus. He lived there for several years while developing his craft and ultimately became a producer, singer, and bandleader. Eventually he was discovered by Eve Efrat, the owner of Public Relations firm Arieli, and Jason Dauman.

== Musical releases ==
Tate's song "With Every Beat of My Heart" was released in 2017 and peaked at number 15 on the UK Commercial Pop Chart, and number 25 on Billboard's American Dance Club Songs Chart. The song was originally written by Arthur Baker, Lotti Golden, and Tommy Faragher, and made famous by Taylor Dayne when she released it in 1989. Tate remade the song with the help of Jason Dauman, Dave Audé, Joe Gauthreaux, DJ Lean, Scotty Boy, and Dan Boots. Tate also released a single "Back To Your Heart", as well as a cover of the Oliver Cheatham song "Get Down Saturday Night". His single "Samba Comigo" charted on Billboard. In 2020, he released, "She Like Dat (Smile Again Riddim)".

In 2021, he released single entitled "A Fool in Love", which sampled from an Aswad track and was produced by Jermaine Ajang Forde. Also he released a single in honor of his late mother Patricia Ann Tate, "Everyday is Mother's Day". On May 20, 2021, Tate released "Blessed", which received a seal of approval from BBC Radio 1 Xtra's Seani B and producer Jazzward on Seani's Spotlight Sessions.

On July 1, 2021, BBC Radio 1 Xtra featured Raphael Tate for international Reggae Day hosted by SeaniB. Singing a remix of Beres Hammond's hit, "Rock Away", Tate was saluted by the original singer.

On October 8, 2021, Tate released a new reggae song called "Fear No Evil". On November 20, 2021, Jeff Majors paid homage to fellow jazz musician, the late Benard Ighner by revamping his 1974 Quincy Jones-produced single, "Everything Must Change". The recording featured Tate. On April 15, 2022, Tate released "Share My Life", produced by Terrence Chamberlin (Bluesteel Studio) and Jermaine Forde (Ajang Music).

On May 13, 2022, Tate released his own composition, "Lord I Need You Near".

March 24, 2023, Tate released the single "Here Without You".

March 25, 2023 Tate made his television debut on UK national ITVX show called Starstruck (2023 TV series). On Starstruck 2023 series 2 Episode 6 Raphael delivered a tribute to James Brown.

August 18, 2023 Tate released his debut album, Love Grieve Live.

== Personal life ==
Raphael Tate has a son named Micah Isaiah Tate & Daughter named Inaya Ann Tate.
