= Kris James =

English singer-songwriter

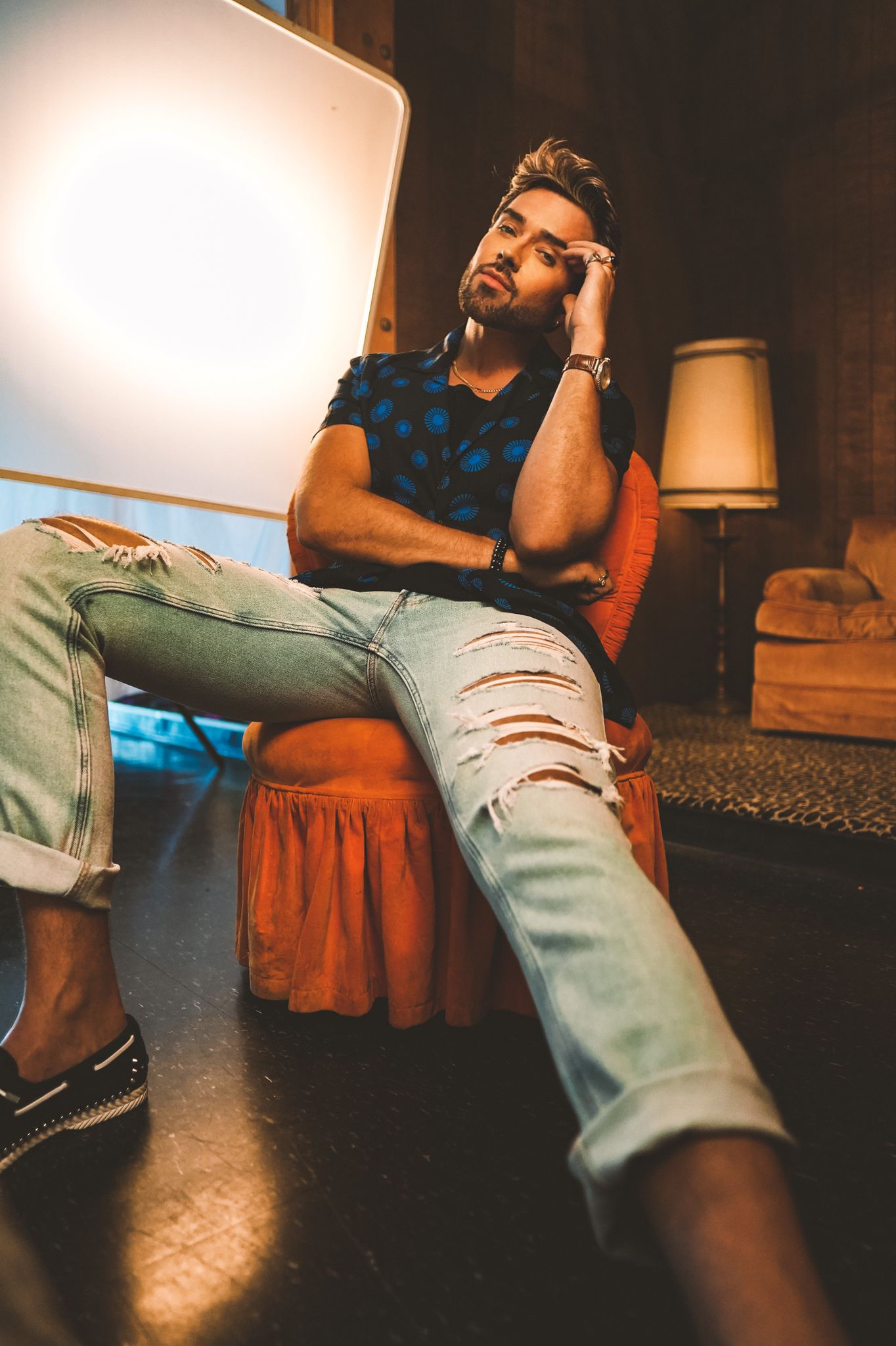

Background information
- Born: Liverpool, England
- Genre: pop music
- Occupations: singer songwriter
- Instrument: vocals
- Years active: 2015–present
- Label: Fairwood Music Publishing
- Website: https://www.krisjamesmusic.com/

Kris James is an English singer-songwriter from Liverpool, England. He was the former lead singer of The Scheme, but now performs as a solo artist.

== Career ==
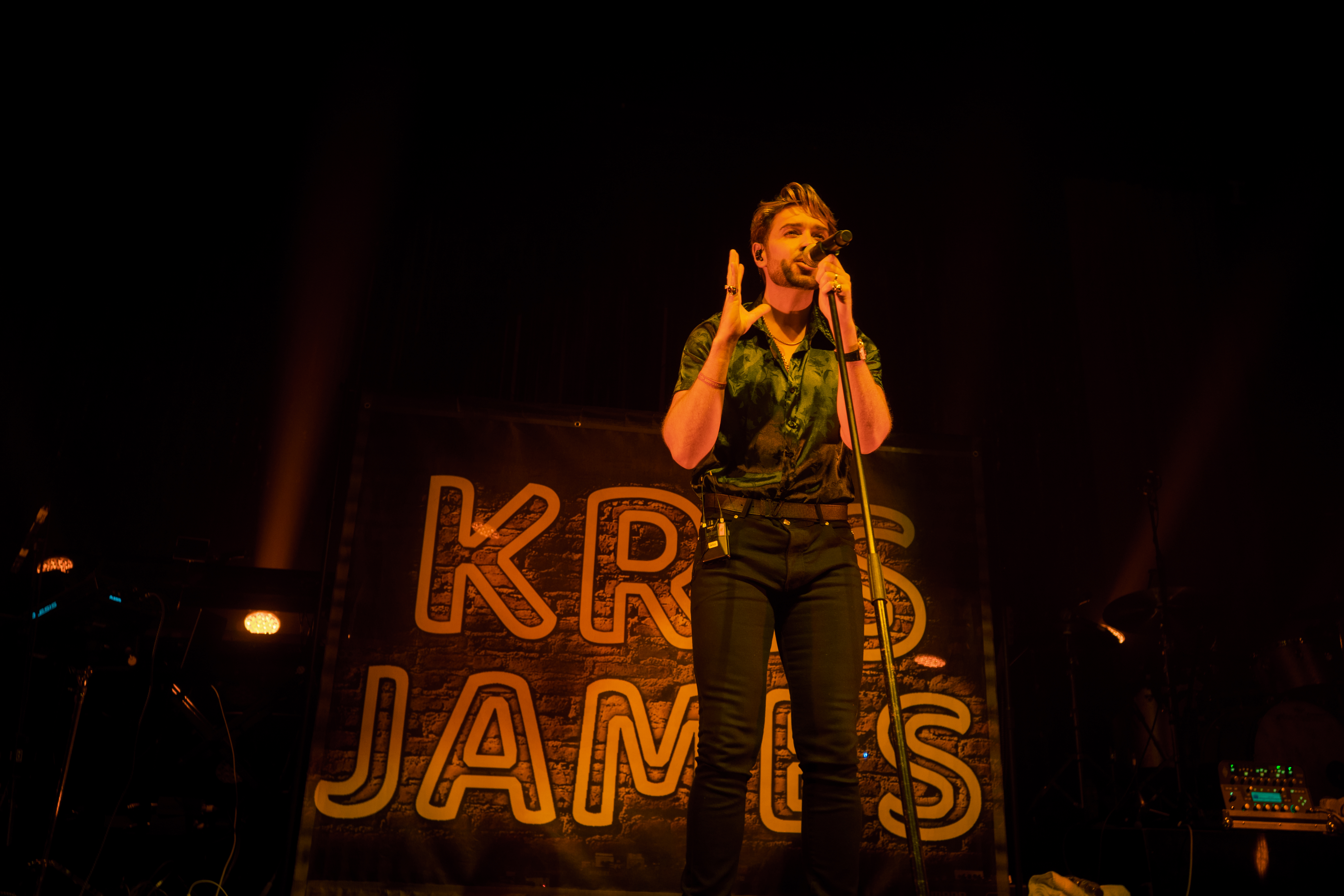
Kris James supporting Will Young at The Princess Theatre, Torquay in 2022.

In early 2015, Kris James together with Kyle Carpenter and Aleksey Lopez made up a boyband called The Scheme. After performing as the lead singer of the boyband The Scheme, Liverpool born singer-songwriter Kris James launched his solo career in mid 2018.

His debut single "Eyes Open" peaked at number 25 in the official iTunes chart, where it held the position for four weeks. The follow-up single "Anymore" was released in the Autumn of 2018 and entered the official iTunes at number 1 in the genre of electronic on the day of release. James' third single "I'll be Here" peaked at number 19 in the official overall iTunes charts. The song was produced by Tom Fuller, who is best known for his work with Amy Winehouse and Robbie Williams.

On 6 November 2021, Kris James presented a debut self-titled album in collaboration with Fairwood Music Publishing, known as the longstanding publishers of David Bowie.

On 5 August 2022, Kris James released "The Way You Move", and on 28 October 2022, the next track "Home" was presented.

In October and November 2022, Kris joined up with Pop Idol winner and international pop star Will Young on his 20 Years Tour in numerous venues including Glasgow and London Palladium accordingly.

== Discography ==
=== The Scheme ===
- "Dust" – Single – 2015
- "Jordan's Smile" – charity single – 2015
- Jerome Heights – EP – 2016

=== As solo artist ===
- "Eyes Open" – 2018
- "Anymore" – 2018
- "I'll Be Here" – 2019
- "Get Back To Love" – 2019
- "Kris James" (album) – November 2021
- "The Way You Move" – August 2022
- "Home" – October 2022
- "Caught Feelings" – June 2023
