= Kendra Erika =

American singer, songwriter, and actress (born 1993)

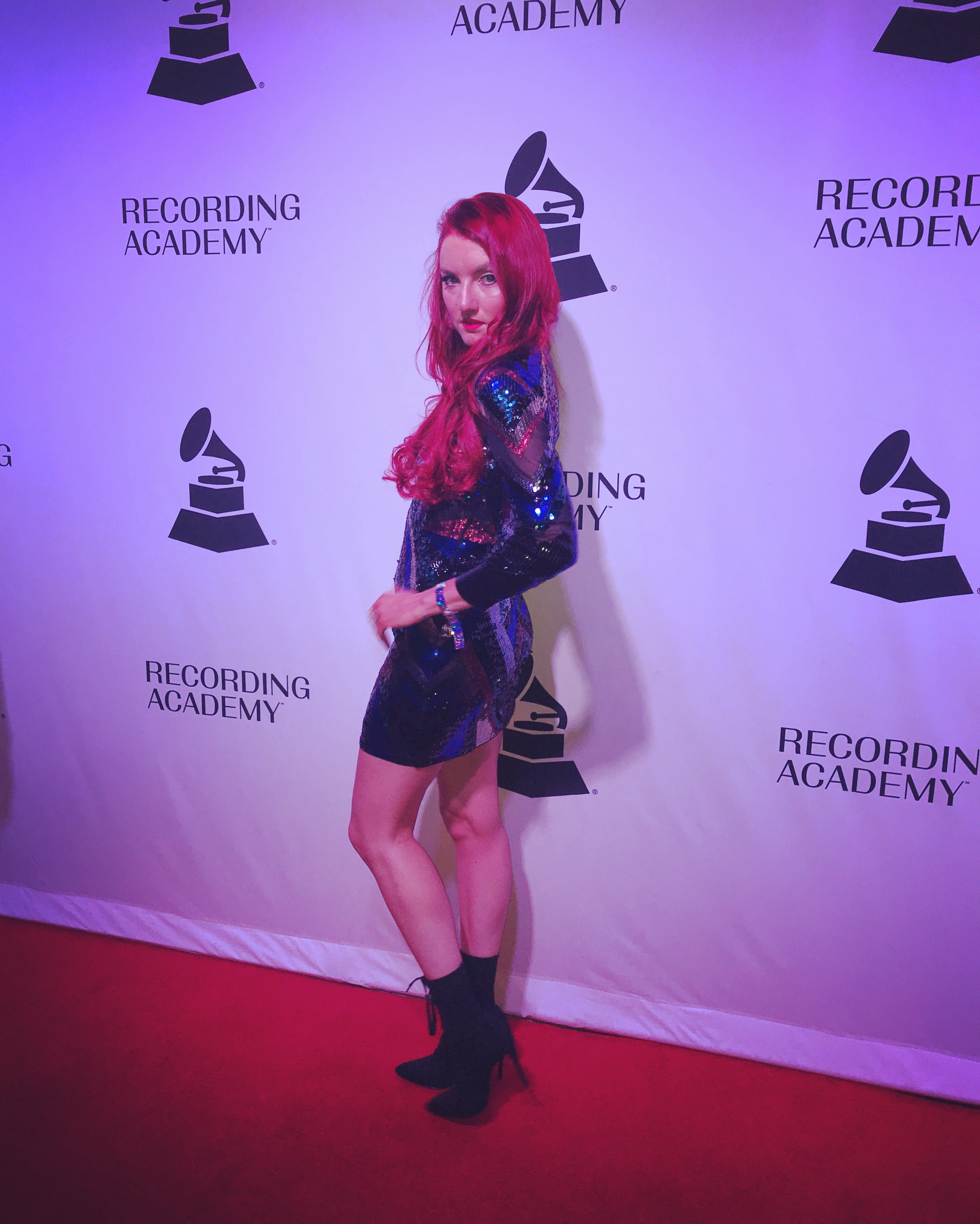
- Erika in 2024

Background information
- Born: Kendra Erika Fulmer; August 12, 1993 (age 33); Boca Raton, Florida, U.S.
- Genres: Pop, dance-pop, deep house, jazz
- Occupations: Singer, songwriter, actress
- Instrument: Vocals
- Years active: 2013–present
- Label: Oyster Shell Music
- Website: kendraerika.com

Kendra Erika Fulmer (born August 12, 1993), known professionally as Kendra Erika, is an American singer, songwriter, and actress. Since 2013 she has released a series of singles that have reached the Billboard Dance Club Songs chart in the United States—including a No. 1 with a 2018 remake of Laura Branigan's "Self Control"—and the Music Week Commercial Pop chart in the United Kingdom.

In the 2020s her work expanded into jazz-influenced pop, and she began appearing in short and feature films. In February 2026 she released License to Thrill, an album of jazz reinterpretations of songs from the James Bond film franchise, which she promoted with a live showcase in Las Vegas.

== Early life and education ==
Erika was born in Boca Raton, Florida, to Ingrid and Fred Fulmer. She began vocal training at age eight, studying classical technique under German opera coach Gisbert Heuer. As a child she performed in community theater productions at Little Palm Theatre and Sol Children Theatre, appearing in Hansel and Gretel, The Phantom of the Opera, and The Sound of Music.

She attended Saint Andrew's School in Boca Raton, where she took part in theater and competed on the varsity golf team, and later earned a bachelor's degree in communications and international business from Lynn University.

== Career ==
=== 2013–2017: Early releases ===
Erika began performing jazz and pop standards at South Florida restaurants, festivals, and venues such as Mizner Park Amphitheater and The Manor Complex. In 2013 she released her debut album, Try to Go On, through Da'Race Records. Its eight tracks included the early singles "I Got a Secret," "Text Me," and "Here to Stay." Her singles "Oasis" (2016) and "Under My Skin" (2017) reached No. 9 and No. 6, respectively, on the Billboard Dance Club Songs chart. In February 2017, Erika received the Georgia Foster Ally Icon Award from the Florida Youth Pride Coalition, recognizing her support for LGBTQ youth, and performed at the organization's Icon Awards ceremony in Davie, Florida.

=== 2018–2020: "Self Control" ===
In 2018 Erika released a cover of Laura Branigan's "Self Control," produced by Grammy-winning producers Damon Sharpe and Eric Sanicola, which reached No. 1 on the Billboard Dance Club Songs chart in early 2019 — her first chart-topper after several top-10 entries. During the COVID-19 pandemic she recorded material remotely with collaborators including Charlie Midnight and John DeNicola, releasing the singles "So Fly" and "Avalanche" in 2020 through Oyster Shell Music. Her single "Break the Wheel" entered the chart on December 28, 2019, and peaked at No. 8 the week of February 22, 2020, after 13 weeks on the chart.

=== 2021–2023: Continued chart releases ===
In 2021 Erika released a dance cover of "As Long As You're Mine" from Wicked featuring Constantine Maroulis, and partnered with the humanitarian organization War Child on the single "Song of Hope." Her single "Thriller Killer" (2022) reached No. 2 on the UK Music Week Commercial Pop chart in April 2023, and a Tobtok remix of her single "Rapture" was used in the second season of HBO Max's The Sex Lives of College Girls. Her 2023 recording of "Witchcraft," made with Ralph Johnson and Myron McKinley of Earth, Wind & Fire, received a production award from the Hollywood Independent Music Awards.

=== 2024–2026: License to Thrill ===
Erika's 2024 single "Body Language" reached No. 3 on the UK Music Week Commercial Pop chart and won a Hollywood Independent Music Award. Her duet "Self Love Symphony," featuring Chloe Lattanzi and Dave Audé, reached No. 5 on the Commercial Pop chart in the week of July 25, 2024. In 2025 she released "Dance in the Fire" through Empire Distribution, co-written with Luigie Gonzalez and Will Gittens; Erika described the song as a response to the California wildfires.

In February 2026 Erika released License to Thrill, a ten-track jazz album reinterpreting Bond film themes such as "Goldfinger," "Skyfall," and "No Time to Die," produced with Myron McKinley and subtitled The James Bond Songbook. She marked the release with a one-night live showcase at The Space in Las Vegas on February 15, 2026, and subsequently performed the material in further concert dates.

=== Acting ===
Alongside her music career, Erika has appeared in films, including The Cherry Picker (2025), based on real events in Hollywood and produced by Ciro Dapagio, and Trust In Love (2024).

== Discography ==
Erika has maintained a steady release schedule since her 2013 debut, issuing dozens of singles, remixes, and EPs; a comprehensive listing is available via Discogs and streaming-platform discography pages. The tables below cover only albums, EPs, and singles with a documented chart position or independent secondary coverage.

=== Albums and EPs ===
| Year | Title | Type | Label | Tracks | Notes |
|---|---|---|---|---|---|
| 2026 | License to Thrill (The James Bond Songbook) | Album | Oyster Shell | 10 | Released February 12, 2026. Jazz covers of Bond film themes — "GoldenEye," "Goldfinger," "Skyfall," "No Time to Die," "Diamonds Are Forever," "For Your Eyes Only," "A View to a Kill," "Writing's on the Wall," and "Surrender" (the alternate Tomorrow Never Dies theme) — plus a jazz version of her earlier single "A Deeper Love." |
| 2023 | Have My Way With You (The Remixes) | EP | Oyster Shell | 4 | Released September 8, 2023. Remixes by LiMiT3R, Klubjumpers, Natty Rico, and Azello. |
| 2022 | Rapture (The Remixes) | EP | Oyster Shell | 4 | Released April 29, 2022. Remixes by Royal Hustle, Luca Debonaire, LiMiT3R, and Ncient. |
| 2015 | Hostage | EP | Kiss Kiss Bang Bang Records | 5 | Released March 3, 2015. Tracks: "Hostage," "Hostage (Cosmo Club Mix)," "Hostage (Mr. Furbzz Remix)," "Wrapped Up," "Straight to Your Love." |
| 2013 | Try to Go On | Album | Da'Race Records | 8 | Released April 3, 2013. Tracks: "Try to Go On," "I Got a Secret," "Text Me," "Here to Stay," "Dance With You," "Move My Body Tonight," "Sandstorm," "Try to Go On (Rdp Remix)." |

=== Selected charting and notable singles ===
| Year | Title | Chart peak | Notes |
|---|---|---|---|
| 2025 | "GoldenEye" | — | Lead single from License to Thrill, released November 2025 ahead of the album |
| 2025 | "Dance in the Fire" | — | Empire Distribution; profiled in Rolling Stone UK |
| 2024 | "Body Language" | UK Music Week Commercial Pop No. 3 | Hollywood Independent Music Award (dance song) |
| 2024 | "Self Love Symphony" | UK Music Week Commercial Pop No. 5 | Feat. Chloe Lattanzi and Dave Audé |
| 2023 | "Witchcraft" | — | Hollywood Independent Music Award (production) |
| 2022 | "Thriller Killer" | UK Music Week Commercial Pop No. 2 | |
| 2022 | "Rapture" | — | Tobtok remix used in The Sex Lives of College Girls (HBO Max) |
| 2021 | "Song of Hope" | — | Benefit single with War Child |
| 2019 | "A Deeper Love" | Billboard Dance Club Songs No. 10 | Peaked August 24, 2019; 14 weeks on chart |
| 2019 | "Break the Wheel" | Billboard Dance Club Songs No. 8 | Peaked February 22, 2020; 13 weeks on chart |
| 2018 | "Self Control" | Billboard Dance Club Songs No. 1 | Cover of Laura Branigan; peaked January 26, 2019; 15 weeks on chart |
| 2018 | "Sublime" | Billboard Dance Club Songs No. 17 | Peaked April 7, 2018; 12 weeks on chart |
| 2017 | "Under My Skin" | Billboard Dance Club Songs No. 6 | Peaked August 12, 2017; 12 weeks on chart |
| 2016 | "Oasis" | Billboard Dance Club Songs No. 9 | Peaked March 4, 2017; 12 weeks on chart |

== Filmography ==
| Year | Title | Role | Notes |
|---|---|---|---|
| 2027 | The Groundskeeper | Isabella | Feature film |
| 2026 | Burning Bridges | Dax's mother | TV pilot |
| 2025 | The Cherry Picker | Pop singer girlfriend | TV pilot |
| 2024 | Trust In Love | Groupie | Feature film |

== Citations ==
- "Kendra Erika Tries to Restore Some Faith in Humanity on 'Song of Hope'". American Songwriter. 2021.
- "Kendra Erika Ranks #6 on Billboard Dance Chart for 'Under My Skin'". BroadwayWorld. August 7, 2017.
- "2023 Winners". Hollywood Independent Music Awards. 2023.
- "2025 Winners and Nominees". Hollywood Independent Music Awards. 2025.
- "Exclusive Listen: Kendra Erika and Constantine Maroulis Release a Wicked Dance Track". TheaterMania. 2021.
- "Kendra Erika – Thriller Killer". Rolling Stone UK. 2023.
- "Kendra Erika Releases New Single 'Body Language'". BroadwayWorld. November 6, 2024.
- "Kendra Erika's "Dance In The Fire" Sparks a New Era of Dancefloor Anthems". Rolling Stone UK. March 31, 2025.
- "Kendra Erika". Palm Beach Illustrated. November 2023. p. 60.
- "Who is this Boca Raton woman with a hit song on the music charts?". The Palm Beach Post. January 10, 2017. Archived from the original on January 16, 2019.
- "Could Boca Raton singer be the next Ariana Grande?". Miami Herald. February 22, 2017.
- "Miami Singer Kendra Erika Reaches the Top of Billboard's Dance Charts". Miami New Times. January 29, 2019.
- "Kendra Erika hits Billboard Dance charts with "Oasis"". Sun Sentinel. February 10, 2016.
- "Exclusive: Kendra Erika on Making Music During the Pandemic". The Untitled Magazine. 2020.
- "The Sex Lives of College Girls Season 2 Soundtrack". Elite Daily. 2022.
- "License To Thrill (album)". Apple Music. 2026.
- "Kendra Erika Brings "License to Thrill, The James Bond Songbook" to Las Vegas for One-Night-Only Album Release Event". Palm Beach Daily News (press release). February 12, 2026.
- "Kendra Erika's 'License to Thrill' Album Release and Showcase Draws VIP Crowd in Las Vegas". EIN Presswire. February 24, 2026.
- "Kendra Erika". Records and Charts (RACPro). 2025.
- Jones, Craig (April 28, 2025). ""Dance In The Fire" (Stonebridge) Kendra Erika". Music House (Euro Solution).
- "Self Love Symphony — Commercial Pop Chart position, week of July 25, 2024". Promotional chart-position graphic released via the artist's official channels. July 25, 2024. Archived from the original on August 15, 2026.
- "Kendra Erika". iHeartRadio. 2026.
- Royal, Denise (February 1, 2017). "Youth Pride Coalition Honors Community with Icon Awards" (PDF). South Florida Gay News – via University of Florida Digital Collections.
- "Meet Kendra Fulmer". Bold Journey. December 28, 2023.
- "Kendra Erika". Discogs. 2026.
- "Kendra Erika – Singles and EPs". Spotify. 2026.
- Creative and Dreams (2014). "Kendra Erika – Try to Go On". Creative and Dreams Music Network.
- "Try to Go On". Spotify. 2013.
- "Hostage". Spotify. 2015.
- "Have My Way With You (The Remixes)". Spotify. 2023.
- "Rapture (The Remixes)". Spotify. 2022.
- Holland, Scott (August 15, 2017). "What's Hot South Florida: Aug. 17 – Aug. 23". Hotspots! Magazine.
- Randy Hulsey (February 11, 2026). "S10: E3: Kendra Erika - Behind The Bond". Backstage Pass Radio (Podcast).
