= For Darfur =

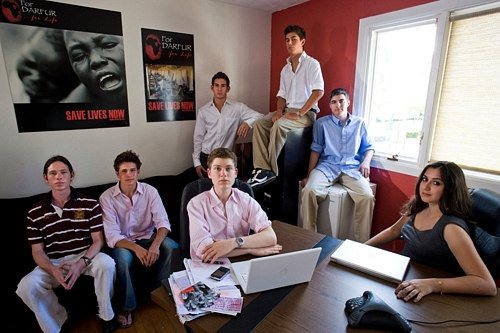
The For Darfur Executive Board.

For Darfur Inc. was a United States based non-profit organization aimed at raising awareness about the ongoing humanitarian conflict in Darfur, Sudan. It raised funds in order to bring aid packages via Doctors Without Borders to refugees affected by the conflict. By August 2008, the organization had raised over $1,000,000 through private fundraising and awareness events. In November 2007, For Darfur, in conjunction with fashion designer Lilly Pulitzer, held a fundraising cocktail party and auction in Palm Beach, Florida, and raised over $100,000. In May 2008, the organization produced and promoted Kanye West's Glow in the Dark Tour Concert at the AmericanAirlines Arena in Miami, Florida.

== History ==
For Darfur Inc. was founded by seven students from Saint Andrew's School in Boca Raton, Florida on January 31, 2007 as a way for teenagers to spread awareness of the Darfur conflict through fundraisers and events. Unlike the Save Darfur Coalition, For Darfur Inc. primarily focuses on staging concert productions. The organization grew from its initial seven members to well over 25 chapters in states across the United States.

For Darfur Inc. was founded by Gabriel Schillinger, Kayle Gishen, Grant Dubler, Matthew Teper, George Merck, Clea Stone, and Jimmy Sunshine .

== Events ==
The organization staged over 35 events since its inception. The majority of events focused on attracting teenagers such as concerts and club events. Events from 2007 included:

- Members were invited guests to sessions at the United Nations
- Promotional Event at Sun-Fest, May 2007, West Palm Beach, Florida
- Jammin' For Darfur Concert, June 2007, Delray Beach, Florida
- Fundraising Event with Jimmy Buffett, November 2007, Palm Beach, Florida
- Co-Sponsor of Youssou N’Dour concert, November 2007, Miami, Florida
- For Darfur members officially opened NASDAQ on December 26, 2007

== Kanye West concert for Darfur ==
On May 6, 2008, For Darfur Inc. produced and promoted Kanye West's Glow in The Dark concert at the AmericanAirlines Arena in Miami, Florida. The concert was an awareness and fundraising show. It brought in over $500,000 that went directly to Doctors Without Borders and had a sellout crowd of over 12,000 people in attendance.

== Mission statement ==
The organization's mission statement was as follows:

Whether the conflict in Darfur ends five years from now or tomorrow, innocent victims will still need critical medical assistance on a continuing basis. Sadly, it is children and the elderly who make up the majority of those suffering and dying. Our goal in working directly with Doctors Without Borders is to help alleviate the immediate medical crisis. Through fundraising and increasing public awareness, we can assist the people of this region on their way to recovery. By doing this, we also create hope for the future, not only for Darfur, but for all of us. Together we can make a real difference... Please join us.

== Board members ==
The organization was run entirely by high school, college, and university students. Its board members were:

- Gabriel Schillinger: executive director
- Grant Dubler: legal director
- Matthew Teper: Marketing and Promotional Director
- George Merck: funds director
- Clea Stone: creative director
- Jimmy Sunshine: South Florida director
- Corey Saft: financial director

== Advisory board ==
For Darfur Inc. also had an advisory board which consisted of Kenny Laguna, Adele Merck, Dr. Brent Schillinger, Mark Sunshine, Michael Epstein, and Rev. George Andrews II.

== Awards ==
The organization received numerous awards for its work in bringing the Darfur conflict to the forefront of teenagers across the country, and the Heroes in Medicine Award. For Darfur received the award in 2007-2008 for its efforts in bringing medical treatment to people affected by health issues resulting from the conflict.

== Partnership with Doctors Without Borders ==
For Darfur donated 80% of funds raised to Doctors Without Borders. For Darfur was at one point their single largest contributor.

== See also ==
- Darfur Conflict
- Sudan
- Genocide
