= Bonnie Anderson (singer) =

Australian singer, songwriter and actress (born 1994)

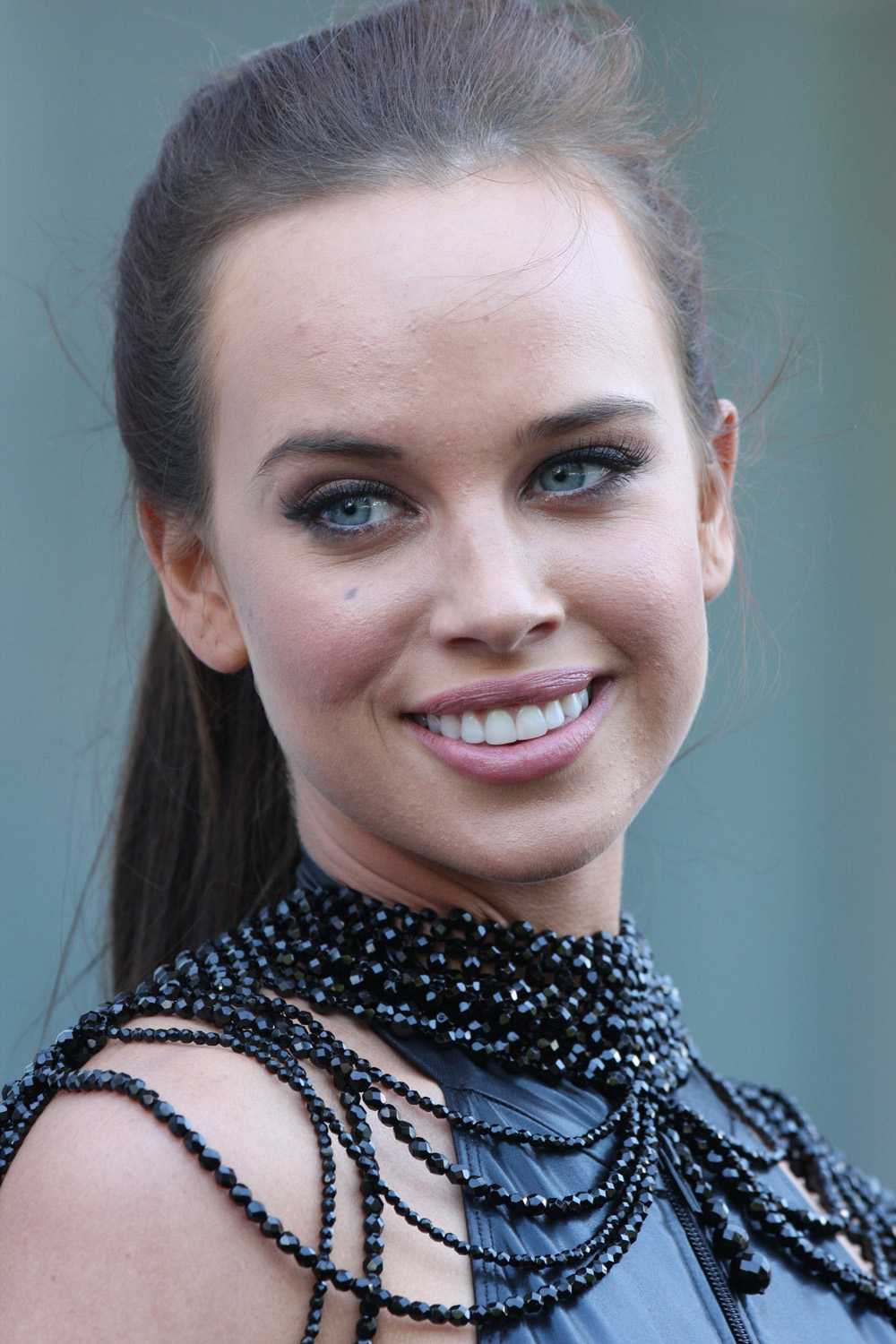
- Anderson at the 2013 ARIA Music Awards
- Born: 5 September 1994 (age 32); Melbourne, Victoria, Australia
- Occupations: Singer; songwriter; actress
- Years active: 2006–present
- Spouse: Samuel Morrison (m. 2023)
- Children: 2
- Musical career
- Genres: Pop; dance
- Instrument: Vocals
- Labels: Standard; BMG Music
- Website: bonnieandersonmusic.com

Bonnie Anderson (born 5 September 1994) is an Australian singer, songwriter and actress. She was the first winner of reality TV show Australia's Got Talent in 2007 at age 12. She released her debut single "Raise the Bar" in 2013. From 2018 until 2021, Anderson played Bea Nilsson in the Australian soap opera Neighbours. In September 2020, she won the second season of The Masked Singer Australia.

== Career ==
=== 2007–2012: Australia's Got Talent ===
Anderson first came to attention in 2007 when she auditioned for the first season of Australia's Got Talent at age 12. Her audition song was "Fire and Rain" and despite being buzzed by judge Red Symons, she had the entire audience standing up and applauding. She advanced with two 'yesses' from Tom Burlinson and Dannii Minogue. Anderson later said "To be honest, when I auditioned for Australia's Got Talent, I did not know what I was in for. A lady who asked me to audition for the show approached me in my hometown at Christmas Carols I sang at every year. I wasn't worried about the audience; I was more excited to sing for the people. That was my dream from a very young age, and all I wanted to do." In April 2007, Anderson was declared the winner and was offered recording and management contracts soon after to which Anderson declined and returned to school. Anderson said "I had labels and management approaching me, but I wasn't ready to take that next step being so young." The year after she won Australia's Got Talent, Anderson's parents bought her a guitar, which she immediately started learning to play.

=== 2012–2016: Music career ===
In 2012, Anderson was featured on a cover of "Gonna Make You Sweat" with fellow Australia's Got Talent alumni Justice Crew. It was the theme song to short-lived dance show Everybody Dance Now. On 8 November 2013, Anderson released her debut solo single "Raise the Bar" The song was written by Anthony Egizii and David Musumeci and peaked at number 55 on the ARIA Charts.

On 13 June 2014, Anderson released a new single, titled "Blackout". Anderson incorporated a highly stylised look for the imagery in its music video, working with the 2013 ARIA Award winner for Best Video Director, Christopher Frey, and celebrity photographer Peter Brew-Bevan. Anderson also toured around Australia with UK singer Olly Murs. The track became her first top 40 single and was certified gold in Australia. Anderson released "Rodeo" in 2014. The single has a country pop production compared to the electronic elements on "Blackout". "Rodeo" failed to chart and was quickly removed from iTunes.

In July 2015, Anderson released "Unbroken". The track was produced by Matt Rad (One Direction, Demi Lovato) and it was mixed by Chris Lord-Alge.

In 2016, Anderson was featured in the "Leather Look" campaign for Maybelline. The collaboration was marked by the release of Anderson's new single "The Ones I Love" in February. Anderson explains, "'The Ones I Love' came from a dream I had. Dreams often trigger stories and songs for me to write about. This one in particular really shook me up, it felt so real! Losing someone you love would be the hardest thing to go through, it even hurts in your dreams, which made me realise how important it is to spend time with my loved ones. This song means so much to me and I hope it resonates with others as well. I can't wait for everyone to hear it." The song became her first charting on the US Dance chart.

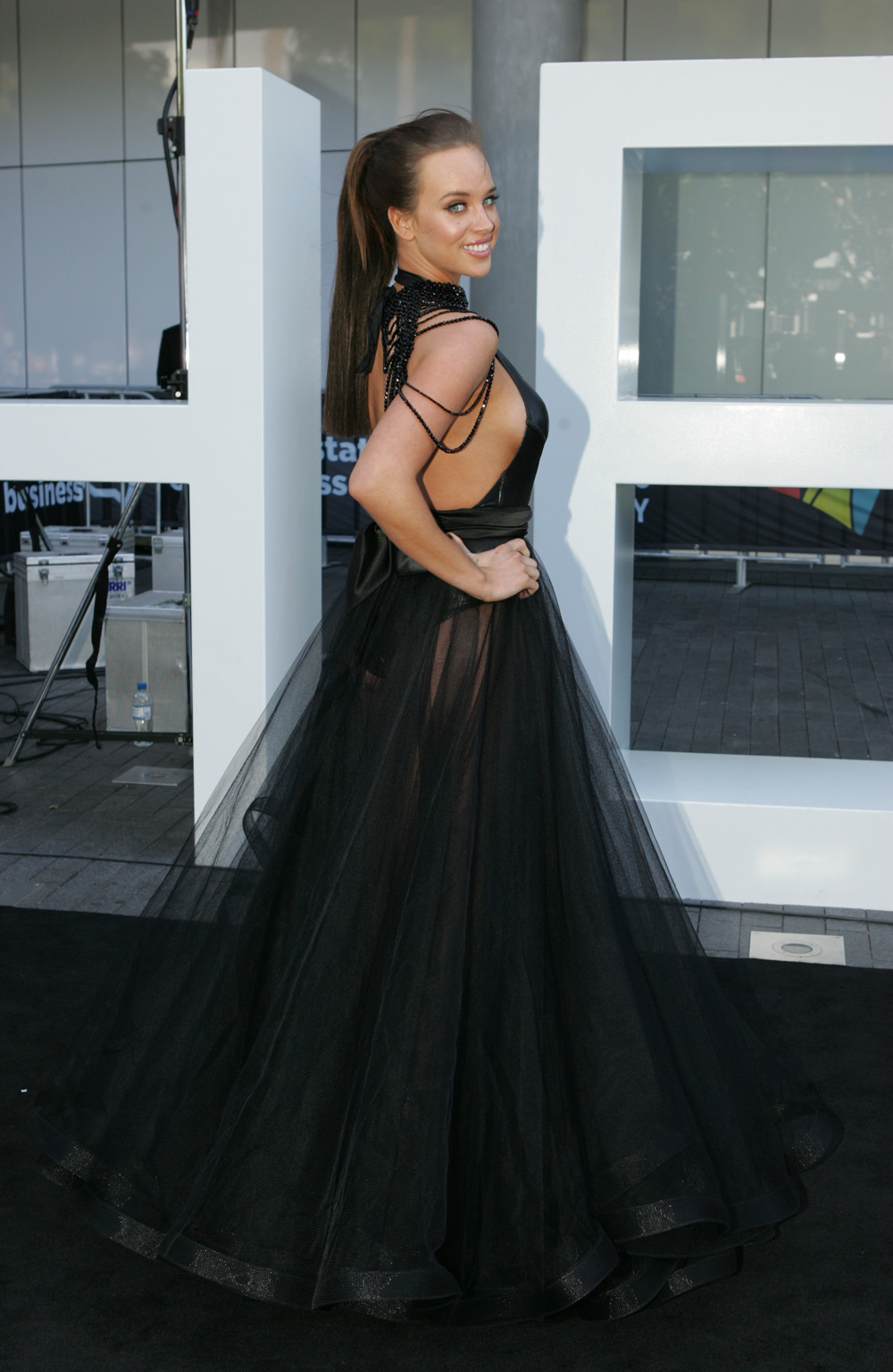
Anderson in 2013

=== 2016–2018: Musical theatre and acting ===
In November 2016, Anderson made her musical theatre debut in Godspell Reimagined. Anderson said "I'm always trying to do different things. I thought I'd give it a shot. It's a pretty wild experience learning the script. I've done a bit of acting before, but doing it for a stage musical is a whole other thing."

In early 2018, Anderson joined the cast of the television soap opera Neighbours as Bea Nilsson. She signed a two-year contract and her first scenes aired on 18 May 2018. In 2019, Anderson received a nomination for the Logie Award for Most Popular New Talent.

=== 2019–present: Return to music ===
On 14 February 2019, Anderson released five promotional cover versions recorded from Neighbours. A sixth, "Amazing Grace", was released on 7 March 2019.

In April 2019, Anderson signed a new deal with BMG Music Australia to release "Sorry", her first single in three years. The song was released in association with Fremantle Australia, the production company for Neighbours and featured on the program as performed by her character. Anderson wrote the song in 2016 and said, "The message throughout 'Sorry' is about standing up and saying enough is enough. It's about accepting the fact that we all experience different walks of life and we may end up in places we're not proud of, but we should never regret where we come from and what we've been through.".

Anderson appeared on Britain's Got Talent: The Champions (August–September 2019), with other participants from various Got Talent shows. She was eliminated in Preliminary 4 on 22 September. She also released the single "Never Be the One" in August 2019, saying that it was about "not always being perfect". From 25 March 2020, Anderson's version of the Neighbours theme song began airing over the serial's opening credits.

In 2020, Anderson participated in the second season of The Masked Singer Australia as the "Bushranger" and she eventually went on to win the show. Anderson left Neighbours in 2021, but returned for the then final episode in July 2022. In mid-2022, Anderson toured Australia with The Music of James Bond, a stage show in which she and Luke Kennedy perform various theme songs from the franchise. Anderson joined the presenting team of the revived Melbourne Weekender in April 2024.

Alongside her former Neighbours co-star Ben Hall, Anderson will star as Gaynor Wheatley in Whispering Jack: The John Farnham Musical at the Roslyn Packer Theatre in November 2026.

== Personal life ==
Anderson dated Dean Ray until 2014 and then Reece Mastin. She is the goddaughter of world boxing champion Lionel Rose.

Anderson announced her engagement to her partner Sam Morrison in April 2022. In June 2022, Anderson announced that they were expecting their first child together, and she gave birth to a son in December 2022. Anderson and Morrison married in Victoria in November 2023. Their second son was born in August 2025.

== Charity work ==
Anderson supports the Alannah and Madeline Foundation, and is also a Tip for Change ambassador.

== Discography ==
=== Singles ===
List of singles, with selected chart positions
Year	Title	Peak chart positions		Certifications	Album
Year	Title	AUS	US Dance	Certifications	Album
2012	"Gonna Make You Sweat" (Justice Crew featuring Bonnie Anderson)	—	—		Non-album singles
2013	"Raise the Bar"	55	—		Non-album singles
2014	"Blackout"	24	—	ARIA: Gold	Non-album singles
2014	"Rodeo"	—	—		Non-album singles
2015	"Unbroken"	63	—		Non-album singles
2016	"The Ones I Love"	160	43		Non-album singles
2019	"Sorry"	—	—		Non-album singles
2019	"Never Be the One"	—	—		Non-album singles
2020	"Together Again" (with Anthony Callea)	— (Note: "Together Again" did not enter the ARIA top 100 Singles Chart, but peaked at number 8 on the Australian Digital Songs Sales Chart.)	—		Non-album singles

=== Promotional singles ===
List of promotional singles
Title	Year
"Oh Holy Night"	2019
"Just for Now"	2019
"I'll Be There"	2019
"I Say a Little Prayer"	2019
"All of Me"	2019
"Amazing Grace"	2019

== Awards and nominations ==
Year	Association	Category	Work	Result	Ref.
2019	Logie Awards	Graham Kennedy Award for Most Popular New Talent	Neighbours	Nominated	
