= Harper Starling =

American singer-songwriter

- Born: Amanda Hoffman; Milwaukee, Wisconsin, U.S.
- Genres: Pop, Dance
- Occupations: Singer, songwriter, Dancer
- Instruments: Vocals, piano, ukulele
- Years active: 2018–present
- Label: Star Groomer Records
- Website: www.harperstarling.com

Harper Starling is an American singer, songwriter and dancer from Milwaukee, Wisconsin. Her song "Euphoria" with The Perry Twins peaked at No. 1 on the Billboard Dance Club Songs chart.

== Early life ==
Starling was born in Milwaukee, Wisconsin and began her career as a dancer at the early age of 3. She began singing at 12 years old. She has received classical training, and has performed in over 50 musicals and operas.

While continuing to pursue her dance and vocal career, Starling simultaneously attended Carroll University where she received an undergraduate degree in kinesiology with an emphasis on physical therapy.

== Career ==
After college, Starling was introduced to Sigmund Snopek of Violent Femmes. Together they performed throughout Southeastern Wisconsin, and opened for Sheryl Crow at Summerfest. Starling performs often in Los Angeles and throughout the West Coast at events including San Francisco Pride, LA Pride, Long Beach Pride, Laguna Pride, Tigerheat and RAGE. Her biggest influences are Lady Gaga, Freddie Mercury, The Weeknd, Prince, Dua Lipa, and Anne Marie.

Four months after the Summerfest performance, Starling moved to Los Angeles to continue developing her musical career and collaborate with established songwriters. In April 2018, she released her hit single "Euphoria" co-written with Kasia Livingston (who has collaborated with Brittany Spears and The Pussycat Dolls), and then remixed the song with The Perry Twins. The latter collaboration went on to peak at No. 1 on the Billboard Dance Club Songs chart, No. 23 on the Billboard Hot Dance/Electronic Songs Chart, and No. 30 for the 2018 Year End Billboard Dance Club Songs Chart. Her follow-up single "One Call Away," co-written by Carlos Battey of The Jackie Boyz reached No. 35 on the Billboard Dance Club Songs. Starling's third song "Boy Problems" (a cover of a Carly Rae Jepsen song by the same name) peaked at No. 16 on the Billboard Dance Club Songs chart.

In 2022 Harper opened along with HRVY for the British boy band, The Wanted on their Most Wanted: The Greatest Hits Tour, across the UK starting in Glasgow and finishing in Liverpool. Some of the arenas included The O2 Arena, Manchester Arena, and OVO Hydro Arena.

== Discography ==
Harper Starling (singles)
Year	Song	Peak chart positions	Notes
Year	Song	Dance Club Songs	Notes
2018	"Euphoria"	1	Peak #1, June 9, 2018–12 weeks
2018	"One Call Away"	35	Peak #35, November 24, 2018–4 weeks
2019	"Boy Problems"	16	Peak #16, March 16, 2019–6 weeks
2019	"I Love Me"		
2019	"Better with Me"		
2020	"No Excuses"		
2020	"The Way"		
2021	"I Love Me Acoustic"		
2021	"Lip Service"		
2021	"No More What If"		
2021	"Cannot Tell A Lie"		
2021	"Snow Cone Christmas"		
2022	"Say My Name (Why Don't Ya Babe)"		
2022	"Affair With Myself Feat. Cindy Valentine"		

== Filmography ==
=== Music Videos ===
- Affair With Myself Feat. Cindy Valentine (2022)
- Snow Cone Christmas (2021)
- Cannot Tell A Lie (2021)
- No More What If (2021)
- I Love Me Acoustic (2021)
- Lip Service (2021)
- Tinsel Wonderland (2021)
- No Excuses (2020)
- I Love Me (2019)
- The Perry Twins ft. Harper Starling - Euphoria (2018)

== Personal life ==
Starling was diagnosed with Tourette syndrome at the age of 8 and considers herself a positive role model using what would be considered a setback as fuel to empower her. She is an advocate to help others.
