= The Perry Twins (duo) =

- Origin: Rhode Island, United States
- Occupations: DJs; producers
- Members: Doug Perry; Derek Perry

The Perry Twins is an American DJ and producer duo consisting of brothers Doug and Derek Perry. Their debut single "Bad, Bad Boy" peaked at number one on the Billboard Dance Club Songs chart.

== Career ==
Originating in Rhode Island, the duo first became known as backup dancers in the 2000s but has been DJing since the late 1990s. They made a name for themselves after working in Los Angeles, establishing themselves as remixers. They later emerged as a recording duo in the 2000s with their debut single titled "Activate My Body" being released and reaching Billboard charts in 2009. Their second single "Bad, Bad Boy" was well-received with gay clubbers.

Their single "Euphoria", collaboration with Harper Starling, was the duo's second number one on the Dance Club Songs chart.

== Awards and nominations ==
The Perry Twins have received the Weho Award for Outstanding DJ.

== Discography ==
=== Singles ===
Title	Year	Peak chart positions	Album
Title	Year	US Club	Album
"Activate My Body" (featuring Jania)	2007	3	Non-album singles
"Bad, Bad Boy" (featuring Niki Haris)	2009	1	Non-album singles
"Euphoria" (featuring Harper Starling)	2018	1	Non-album singles
