= Perché non torna più =

Single by Laura Pausini

from the album Laura Pausini
- B-side: "¿Por qué no volverán?" (Spanish version)
- Released: October 1993
- Genre: Pop
- Length: 4:46
- Label: CGD
- Songwriters: Pietro Cremonesi, Federico Cavalli and Angelo Valsiglio

Laura Pausini singles chronology
"Non c'è" (1993)	"Perché non torna più" (1993)	"Strani amori" (1994)

Music video
- "Perché non torna più" on YouTube

"Perché non torna più" (English: Why does it not return any more) is an Italian ballad recorded by pop singer Laura Pausini. It is a single from the singers first album Laura Pausini. The song is translated into Spanish under the title ¿Por qué no volverán?, this version being present on Pausini's first Spanish language album, issued in late 1994.

The song is present on Pausini's first compilation album, issued in 1995.

The song was written by Pietro Cremonesi, Federico Cavalli and producer Angelo Valsiglio, and sung by Laura Pausini.

== Videoclip ==
The videoclip of the song was recorded in Italy, possibly on the same beach as the La solitudine videoclip was recorded. Pausini is shown singing in the sand, sometimes the image on the screen are alternated to clips of three young girls playing and giggling (alluding to the fact that the song's lyrics are a tribute to Laura's friends Laura and Simona, who died in a car accident before the album was released.

== Track listing ==
CDS - Promo Warner Music Italia (1993)

1. Perché non torna più

CDS - 4509971732 Warner Music Francia (1993)

1. Non c'è
2. Perché non torna più

CDS - 4509944352 Warner Music Francia Europa (1993)

1. Non c'è (Radio version)
2. Perché non torna più
3. Non c'è (Instrumental)

CDS - 4509982522 Warner Music Europa (1995)

1. Lettera
2. La soledad
3. Perché non torna più

Digital download

1. Perché non torna più
2. ¿Por qué no volverán?
