= Maniaca =

2023 single by Abraham Mateo

"Maníaca"

Single by Abraham Mateo

from the album Insomnio
- Language: Spanish
- English title: Maniac
- Released: 15 June 2023
- Genre: pop; Dance-pop; Latin pop; Synth-pop; new wave; Dance-rock
- Length: 2:55
- Label: Sony Music España
- Songwriters: Abraham Mateo Chamorro; Max Borghetti; José Cano Carrilero; Dennis Joseph Matkosky; Michael Sembello
- Producer: Dani Ruiz

Abraham Mateo singles chronology
"Clavaíto" (2023)	"Maníaca" (2023)	"XQ Sigues Pasando" (2023)

Music video
- "Maníaca" on YouTube

"Maníaca" is a song by Spanish singer and songwriter Abraham Mateo. It was released on 15 June 2023 through Sony Music España as a single from Mateo's seventh studio album, Insomnio.

The song is a Spanish-language reinterpretation of Michael Sembello's 1983 single "Maniac", originally associated with the film Flashdance. Sony Music España described Mateo's version as a modern Spanish adaptation that combines the recognisable 1980s energy of the original with contemporary Latin-pop and dance-oriented elements.

In Spain, "Maníaca" was certified double platinum by PROMUSICAE and reached number 71 on the Spanish Top 100 Songs chart. It also reached number one on the LOS40 chart in November 2023, becoming Mateo's first solo number-one single on that chart.

== Background and release ==
Before its official release, Mateo performed an early version of "Maníaca" at LOS40 Primavera Pop 2023, where he also premiered "Clavaíto" with Chanel. LOS40 reported that the song was first performed live on 14 April 2023 in Madrid and Barcelona, generating demand from fans before its commercial release.

Sony Music España announced the single as an updated Spanish-language interpretation of the 1983 hit "Maniac", highlighting its connection with the visual and musical legacy of Flashdance. The label stated that the single was released together with its official music video, which pays tribute to the film's visual aesthetic.

== Composition ==
"Maníaca" was written by Abraham Mateo Chamorro, Max Borghetti, José Cano Carrilero, Dennis Joseph Matkosky and Michael Sembello. Dani Ruiz is credited as producer, while Abraham Mateo is credited as recording engineer. Felipe Guevara handled mixing, and Carlos Hernández Carbonell handled mastering.

The song preserves the central identity of Sembello's "Maniac" while replacing the original English verses with new Spanish-language material. According to Sony Music España, Mateo considered the chorus a Spanish homage to one of his favourite songs and felt a strong responsibility when writing new verses and producing the reinterpretation because of the worldwide success of the original.

Musically, the song combines retro 1980s dance-pop elements with contemporary Latin-pop production, including programming, rhythmic drive and a club-oriented structure. LOS40 described the song as a modern version that transports the listener back to Flashdance, while also bringing the track closer to a younger audience through Latin and dance-pop textures. The song draws on the 1980s pop, dance-rock and new wave sound associated with Michael Sembello's original "Maniac", while adapting it into a contemporary Spanish-language Latin pop and dance-pop production.

== Lyrics and theme ==
Lyrically, "Maníaca" centres on a woman whose passion for dancing becomes the main focus of the narrator's fascination. The song uses the term "maníaca" to describe her intense and uninhibited presence on the dance floor, connecting the Spanish-language adaptation with the energy of Michael Sembello's original "Maniac".

The lyrics also build a contrast between the character's everyday life and her nightlife persona, presenting her as someone who studies during the day and becomes absorbed by music and dancing at night. References to Flashdance reinforce the song's connection with the 1983 film and its dance-oriented imagery.

Musically, the song adapts the 1980s dance-pop identity of the original recording into a contemporary Spanish-language production with Latin pop elements. Sony Music España described the single as a modern reinterpretation of the classic song, while LOS40 noted that the version combines the familiar dance sound of the original with more Latin-influenced touches.

== Music video ==
The official music video for "Maníaca" was released alongside the single through Abraham Mateo's YouTube channel. The video was directed by Willy Rodríguez.

The video references the visual language of Flashdance, including choreography and staging inspired by the film's dance imagery. Mateo also stated that he wanted to include dance steps as a tribute to the film and as a way to strengthen the song's live and social-media performance potential.

== Commercial performance ==
In Spain, "Maníaca" reached number 71 on the Top 100 Songs chart published by El Portal de Música, PROMUSICAE's official chart platform, and remained on the chart for 12 weeks. The song was certified double platinum in Spain by PROMUSICAE.

On 11 November 2023, "Maníaca" reached number one on the LOS40 chart. LOS40 noted that it became Abraham Mateo's third number-one song on the chart, after "Quiero decirte" with Ana Mena and "Clavaíto" with Chanel, and his first number one as a solo artist.

== Live performances and recognition ==
Mateo performed "Maníaca" at LOS40 Music Awards Santander 2023, where the staging included references to the 1980s and Flashdance.

In November 2024, Mateo performed "Maníaca" as part of the interval programming of the Junior Eurovision Song Contest 2024 in Madrid. RTVE reported that he was one of the guest artists of the event and that his performance took place during the show alongside other special numbers.

In January 2025, Europa FM users selected "Maníaca" as their favourite among several of the most-played songs of 2024, placing it first in the station's public vote with 435 votes.

== Track listing ==
Digital download and streaming

1. "Maníaca" – 2:55

== Credits and personnel ==
Credits adapted from Shazam and Deezer.

=== Performing artists ===
- Abraham Mateo Chamorro – vocals
- Dani Ruiz – programming

=== Songwriting ===
- Abraham Mateo Chamorro – songwriter, composer
- Max Borghetti – songwriter, composer
- José Cano Carrilero – songwriter, composer
- Dennis Joseph Matkosky – songwriter, composer
- Michael Sembello – songwriter, composer

=== Production and engineering ===
- Dani Ruiz – production
- Abraham Mateo Chamorro – recording engineering
- Felipe Guevara – mixing engineering
- Carlos Hernández Carbonell – mastering engineering

== Charts ==
Chart performance for "Maníaca"
Chart	Peak position
Spain (PROMUSICAE)	71
Spain (LOS40)	1

== Certifications ==
Certifications for "Maníaca"
Region	Certification	Certified units
Spain (PROMUSICAE)	2× Platinum	80.000

== Release history ==
Region	Date	Format	Label
Various	15 June 2023	Digital download, streaming	Sony Music España
