= Quiero Decirte =

2022 single by Abraham Mateo and Ana Mena

Single by Abraham Mateo and Ana Mena

from the album Insomnio
- Language: Spanish
- English title: I Want to Tell You
- Released: 12 May 2022
- Genre: Pop
- Length: 3:42
- Label: Sony Music España
- Songwriters: Abraham Mateo Chamorro, Ana Mena Rojas, Jose Alfonso Cano Carrilero, Timor Shait
- Producers: Abraham Mateo, Dani Ruiz

Abraham Mateo singles chronology
"Vamos que nos vamos" (2022)	"Quiero Decirte" (2022)	"Yo por ti" (2022)

Music video
- "Quiero Decirte" on YouTube

"Quiero Decirte" is a song by Spanish singers and songwriters Abraham Mateo and Ana Mena. It was released on 12 May 2022 through Sony Music España as the first single from Mateo's seventh studio album, Insomnio.

The song is a Spanish-language pop ballad centred on remorse, emotional vulnerability and the desire for reconciliation after a breakup. It became one of the most commercially successful collaborations in the catalogues of both artists in Spain, where it was certified four-times platinum by PROMUSICAE.

== Background and release ==
Sony Music España announced the release of "Quiero Decirte" on 13 May 2022, describing the single as a pop song and highlighting the collaboration between Abraham Mateo and Ana Mena, two Spanish artists who had known each other since childhood. The label also stated that the track was made available on digital platforms alongside its official music video.

The single was released during a period in which Mateo was moving back towards a more direct Spanish pop sound, while continuing to develop his profile as a singer, songwriter and producer. For Mena, the collaboration arrived after a series of successful releases in Spain and Italy, strengthening her position as one of the most internationally visible Spanish female pop artists of her generation.

== Composition and lyrics ==
"Quiero Decirte" was written by Abraham Mateo Chamorro, Ana Mena Rojas, Jose Alfonso Cano Carrilero and Timor Shait, and was produced by Abraham Mateo and Dani Ruiz.

Musically, the song is built as a contemporary pop ballad with urban-pop influences. Its lyrical theme revolves around regret after the end of a romantic relationship, with both performers addressing a former lover and expressing the desire to apologise, recover what was lost and ask for another chance.

== Music video ==
The official music video for "Quiero Decirte" was released through Abraham Mateo's YouTube channel on the same day as the single. It was directed by Willy Rodríguez and produced by Ignacio Martínez. According to Sony Music España, the video uses a colourful lighting palette and a visually romantic atmosphere intended to reflect the emotional connection between Mateo and Mena.

== Commercial performance ==
In Spain, "Quiero Decirte" reached number 30 on the weekly Top 100 Songs chart published by El Portal de Música for the week of 6–12 January 2023. PROMUSICAE's single page for the track lists a peak position of number 10 and a total of 85 weeks on the chart.

The song was certified four-times platinum in Spain, equivalent to 160,000 certified units.

In Italy, the song entered the FIMI singles chart at number 87 during the chart week of 24–30 October 2025.

== 2025 resurgence and Italian version ==
In 2025, "Quiero Decirte" experienced renewed attention after being associated with Culpa Nuestra, the Prime Video film based on the Culpables literary saga by Mercedes Ron. Spanish radio network LOS40 reported that the song gained new visibility in several international markets following its use in connection with the film.

On 4 December 2025, Mateo and Mena released an Italian-language version of the song titled "Quiero Decirte (Voglio Dirti)". LOS40 described the release as an attempt to adapt the song for the Italian market while preserving the emotional essence of the original version.

== Track listing ==
Digital download and streaming

1. "Quiero Decirte" – 3:42

Digital download and streaming – Italian version

1. "Quiero Decirte (Voglio Dirti)" – 3:42

== Credits and personnel ==
Credits adapted from Shazam and Apple Music.

=== Musicians ===
- Abraham Mateo Chamorro – vocals, keyboards, programming
- Ana Mena Rojas – vocals
- Dani Ruiz – programming, keyboards

=== Production and engineering ===
- Abraham Mateo – production, recording engineering
- Dani Ruiz – production
- Dabruk – recording engineering
- Felipe Guevara – mixing engineering
- Carlos Hernández Carbonell – mastering engineering

== Charts ==
Chart performance for "Quiero Decirte"
Chart	Peak position
Italy (FIMI)	87
Spain (PROMUSICAE)	30

== Certifications ==
Certifications for "Quiero Decirte"
Region	Certification	Certified units
Spain (PROMUSICAE)	4× Platinum	160,000

== Release history ==
Region	Date	Format	Version	Label
Various	12 May 2022	Digital download, streaming	Original Spanish version	Sony Music España
Various	4 December 2025	Digital download, streaming	Italian-language version	Sony Music Entertainment
