= Lettera =

Single by Laura Pausini

from the album Laura
- B-side: "La soledad", "Perché non torna più"
- Released: 1994
- Recorded: Santanna Recording Studios (Castelfranco Emilia, Modena)
- Genre: Pop
- Length: 3:45
- Label: CGD
- Songwriters: Angelo Valsiglio, Giovanni Salvatori, Cheope, Marco Marati

Laura Pausini singles chronology
"Gente" (1994)	"Lettera" (1994)	"Lui non sta con te" (1994)

"Lettera" (English: "Letter") is a song by Italian singer Laura Pausini, released in 1994 as the third single from her second studio album, Laura. The song was also translated in Spanish for her album Laura Pausini, with the title "Carta".

== Track listing ==
CD Single (CGD 4509 98252-2)

1. "Lettera" – 3:42
2. "La soledad" – 4:04
3. "Perché non torna più" – 4:10

== Charts ==
=== Weekly charts ===
==== "Lettera" ====
Chart (1994)	Peak position
Belgium (Ultratop 50 Flanders)	41
Netherlands (Dutch Top 40 Tipparade)	6
Netherlands (Single Top 100)	43

==== "Carta" ====
Chart (1995)	Peak position
Panama (UPI)	3
Peru (UPI)	9
