= Gente (song) =

Single by Laura Pausini

from the album Laura
- Released: June 1994
- Genre: Pop
- Length: 4:25
- Label: CGD
- Songwriters: Cheope, Marco Marati, Angelo Valsiglio
- Producer: Angelo Valsiglio

Laura Pausini singles chronology
"Strani amori" (1994)	"Gente" (1994)	"Lettera" (1994)

Gente (English: People) is an Italian-language song recorded by Laura Pausini and written by Cheope, Marco Marati and Angelo Valsiglio. It was released in 1994 as the second single from Pausini's second album, Laura. The song bears a striking resemblance to the Marco Ferradini song "Teorema."

A Spanish-language version of the song was released by Pausini on her 1994 album Laura Pausini. Both versions of the song were re-recorded with a new arrangement by Celso Valli for Pausini's first greatest hits album, The Best of Laura Pausini: E ritorno da te / Lo mejor de Laura Pausini: Volveré junto a ti and later would be re-recorded with a new arrangement for Pausini's second greatest hits album, 20 - The Greatest Hits / 20 - Grandes Éxitos.

== Track listings ==
CD Single (CGD – 4509 97101 2)
No.	Title	Writer(s)	Length
1.	"Gente" (Italian Version)	Cheope, Marco Marati, Angelo Valsiglio	4:30
2.	"La soledad"	Valsiglio, Pietro Cremonesi, Federico Cavalli, J. Badia	4:04

CD Single (CGD – 4509 96127-2)
No.	Title	Writer(s)	Length
1.	"Gente" (Italian Version)	Cheope, Marco Marati, Angelo Valsiglio	4:30
2.	"La soledad"	Valsiglio, Cremonesi, Cavalli, Badia	4:04
3.	"Il cuore non si arrende"	Valsiglio, Cremonesi, Cavalli	4:40

Maxi-Single (CGD – 0630 1111 9-2)
No.	Title	Writer(s)	Length
1.	"Gente" (Italian Version)	Cheope, Marco Marati, Angelo Valsiglio	4:30
2.	"La soledad"	Valsiglio, Cremonesi, Cavalli, Badia	4:04
3.	"Se fue"	Valsiglio, Cremonesi, Cavalli	4:40

== Covers ==
The Italian-language version of the song was covered in 1995 by Brazilian singer Renato Russo and included in his album Equilíbrio distante.

== Charts ==
=== Weekly charts ===
==== Italian version ====
Chart (1994–1995)	Peak position
Belgium (Ultratop 50 Flanders)	23
France (SNEP)	43
Netherlands (Dutch Top 40)	34
Netherlands (Single Top 100)	41

==== Spanish version ====
Chart (1995)	Peak position
El Salvador (UPI)	5
Puerto Rico (UPI)	3
US Hot Latin Songs (Billboard)	13
US Latin Pop Airplay (Billboard)	1
US Tropical Songs (Billboard)	10

=== Year-end charts ===
==== Spanish version ====
Chart (1995)	Position
US Latin Pop Airplay (Billboard)	13

== See also ==
- List of number-one Billboard Hot Latin Pop Airplay of 1995
