= Laura (Laura Pausini album) =

Studio album by Laura Pausini
- Released: February 26, 1994
- Studios: Santanna Recording Studios, Castelfranco Emilia
- Genres: Italian pop; adult contemporary
- Length: 42:33
- Language: Italian
- Label: CGD
- Producers: Angelo Valsiglio; Marco Marati

Laura Pausini chronology
Laura Pausini (1993)	Laura (1994)	Laura Pausini (1994)

Singles from Laura
- 1. "Strani amori" Released: February 1994; 2. "Gente" Released: June 1994; 3. "Lui non sta con te" Released: October 1994; 4. "Lettera" Released: 1995

Professional ratings
Review scores
Source	Rating
Allmusic	3/5 stars

Laura is the second studio album by Italian singer Laura Pausini, released by CGD Records on February 26, 1994. It has sold three million copies in the world.

== Track info ==
The release of the album coincides with the participation of Laura Pausini in the Sanremo Festival 1994, where the singer made her debut in the category Giovani after winning the previous year as the Nuove proposte.

At the stage, Pausini, a big favourite of the spectators, ranked third in the final ranking.

The piece presented, Strani amori, was attacked by critics because it was judged too conservative and adolescent and some journalists in the industry saw it as a trivial piece.

Within the disc is also included the second single extracted from the album Gente. Some tracks from the album were translated into Spanish and inserted on the version released in Spain and South America for the album Laura Pausini, released in 1994. The same tracks were released in Italian on the English version of the same album, released in 1995.

The song Ragazze che, much like the entire album, is dedicated to Silvia Pausini, sister of the singer.

== Promotion ==
Since Pausini was not known outside Europe at the time the album was released, no tour was yielded to support the album. Although, Pausini's tours that date from after the World Wide Tour 1997 have at least one song from the album. These songs are Strani amori, Gente, Un amico è così, Il coraggio che non c'è, Ragazze che, Lui non sta con te and Lettera, with the first two being sung on every of Pausini's tours.

== Track listing ==
No.	Title	Writer(s)	Length
1.	"Gente"	Angelo Valsiglio; Cheope; Marco Marati	4:30
2.	"Lui non sta con te"	A. Valsiglio; Roberto Buti; Cheope; M. Marati	3:45
3.	"Strani amori"	A. Valsiglio; R. Buti; Cheope; M. Marati	4:10
4.	"Ragazze che"	A. Valsiglio; R. Buti; Cheope; M. Marati	4:30
5.	"Il coraggio che non c'è"	A. Valsiglio; Cheope; M. Marati	4:35
6.	"Un amico è così"	A. Valsiglio; R. Buti; Cheope; M. Marati	4:10
7.	"Amori infiniti"	A. Valsiglio; Cheope; Stefano Jurgens	3:40
8.	"Cani e gatti"	A. Valsiglio; Giuseppe Carella; Cheope	5:03
9.	"Anni miei"	A. Valsiglio; Salvatore Monetti; Cheope; M. Marati	4:15
10.	"Lettera"	A. Valsiglio; Giovanni Salvatori; Cheope; M. Marati	3:42
Total length:			42:33

== Charts ==
=== Weekly charts ===
Chart (1994–1995)	Peak position
Belgian Albums (IFPI)	3
Chilean Albums (IFPI)	2
Dutch Albums (Album Top 100)	1
European Top 100 Albums (Billboard)	13
Finnish Albums (Suomen virallinen lista)	7
French Albums (SNEP)	21
Italian Albums (Musica e dischi)	2
Swiss Albums (Schweizer Hitparade)	4

=== Year-end charts ===
Chart (1994)	Position
Italian Albums (FIMI)	6
Swiss Albums (Schweizer Hitparade)	6

== Certifications ==
Region	Certification	Certified units/sales
Argentina (CAPIF)	Platinum	60,000^{^}
Belgium (BRMA)	Gold	25,000^{*}
Brazil (Pro-Música Brasil)	Gold	100,000^{*}
Netherlands (NVPI)	Platinum	100,000^{^}
Switzerland (IFPI Switzerland)	2× Platinum	100,000^{^}
Summaries
Europe (IFPI)	Platinum	1,000,000^{*}
^{*} Sales figures based on certification alone.^{^} Shipments figures based on certification alone.
