= Señorita (Abraham Mateo song) =

Single by Abraham Mateo

from the album AM
- Released: November 6, 2012
- Recorded: 2012
- Genre: Electropop, dance
- Length: 3:18
- Label: Sony Music Spain
- Songwriters: Herbie Crichlow; Thomas Troelsen
- Producer: Jacobo Calderon

Abraham Mateo singles chronology
"Desde Que Te Fuiste" (2011)	"Señorita" (2012)	"Girlfriend" (2013)

Alternate cover
- The slipcover for the 2013 CD Maxi Single.

Music video
- "Señorita" on YouTube

"Señorita" (English: "Miss" or "Young Lady") is a Latin electropop song from Spanish singer Abraham Mateo, sung in Spanglish. The song was released as the first single from Mateo's second studio album AM on November 6, 2012. The song, written by Herbie Crichlow and Thomas Troelsen and adapted by Jacobo Calderón, achieved huge success in many countries of Latin America and Europe. A CD maxi single of Señorita was released on May 14, 2013.

The music video for the song was released on 12 February 2013, on Abraham Mateo's Vevo YouTube channel. It was shot in Madrid under the direction by Jota Aronak. The video has received over 180 million views on YouTube as of June 2023.

== Commercial performance ==
"Señorita" was listed for 40 weeks on the Spain's Top 50 singles chart, peaked on number three, and was certified Gold in Spain. The music video for "Señorita", published on YouTube as of February 12, 2013, was the most trending music video of 2013 on YouTube Spain. On 9 November 2012, Mateo performed the single for the first time at the Coca-Cola Music concert, at Palacio de Deportes in Madrid. In July 2013, he performed "Señorita" at the 2013 Premios Juventud Awards, at the BankUnited Center in Miami, sharing the stage with Jennifer Lopez, Marc Anthony, Pitbull, Prince Royce and other artists.

== Track listings ==
Digital Download

1. "Señorita" — 3:18

CD maxi

1. "Señorita" — 3:22
2. "Señorita" (acoustic version) — 3:10
3. "Señorita" (Fashion Beat Team remix) — 3:44
4. "Señorita" (Club Remix) — 5:08
5. "Mi Super Estrella" — 3:25

== Charts ==
=== Weekly charts ===
Chart (2012–13)	Peak position
Spain (PROMUSICAE)	3

=== Year-end charts ===
Chart (2013)	Peak position
Spain (PROMUSICAE)	23
