= Tutt'al più =

Promotional single by Laura Pausini

from the album Laura Pausini
- Released: 1993
- Genre: Pop
- Length: 4:29
- Label: CGD
- Songwriter(s): Robert Casini; Angelo Valsiglio; Pietro Cremonesi
- Producer(s): Angelo Valsiglio; Marco Marati

Tutt'al più (English: At most) is a song by Italian pop singer Laura Pausini. The song was composed by Angelo Valsiglio and Pietro Cremonesi and written by Roberto Casini. The song is translated into Spanish under the title ¿Por qué no?. The song was released as a promotional single from her debut album Laura Pausini.

== Track listing ==
CDS - Promo Warner Music Italia (1993)

1. "Tutt'al più"

CDS - Warner Music Europa (1993)

1. "Tutt'al più"
2. "Dove sei"

CDS - Warner Music Spagna (1995)

1. "Gente" (Spanish Version)
2. "¿Por qué no?"

CDS - PCD966 Warner Music Mexico (1995)

1. "Amigos mios" (Laureano Brizuela)
2. "¿Por qué no?" (Laura Pausini)
