= AM (Abraham Mateo album) =

Studio album by Abraham Mateo
- Released: November 12, 2013
- Recorded: July 2013
- Genre: Pop
- Length: 39:22
- Label: Sony Music
- Producer: Jacobo Calderón

Abraham Mateo chronology
Abraham Mateo (2009)	AM (2013)	Who I AM (2014)

Singles from AM
- 1. "Señorita" Released: November 6, 2012; 2. "Girlfriend" Released: October 14, 2013; 3. "Lánzalo" Released: March 17, 2014

AM is the second studio album by Spanish pop music artist Abraham Mateo. It was released on November 12, 2013, through Sony Music Spain. The album debuted at number six on the Spain's Top 100 albums chart and was listed for 52 weeks. It was certified Gold in Spain.

AM was recorded in Madrid and Miami and represented a change in Mateo's music style: in addition to ballad songs, it also included pop and electropop music, and Spanglish lyrics.

Mateo rose to popularity with AM's first single, "Señorita", released in November 2012. The song, written by Herbie Crichlow and Thomas Troelsen, was listed for 40 weeks on the Spain's Top 50 singles chart, peaked on number three, and was certified Gold in Spain. The music video for "Señorita" was the most trending music video of 2013 on YouTube Spain. The album's second single, "Girlfriend", written by Charlie Mason, Jani Hölli and Gabriel Warmby, was released early October 2013 and debuted within the top fifteen in Spain. The third and last single, "Lánzalo", written by his producer Jacobo Calderón and Mateo himself, was released in March 2014 as a charity single, in support of UNICEF campaign for the children who suffer as a result of the Syrian conflict. The song debuted at number two on the Spain's Top 50 singles chart.

== Track listing ==
No.	Title	Writer(s)	Length
1.	"Señorita"	Herbie Crichlow, Thomas Troelsen	3:20
2.	"Get the Phone"	Abraham Mateo, Jacobo Calderon, Natalia Hajjara, Ana Díaz, Tim Deal	3:22
3.	"Lánzalo"	Abraham Mateo, Jacobo Calderón, Juan Mari Montes	3:59
4.	"Girlfriend"	Charlie Mason, Gabriel Wärmby, Jani Kristian Hölli, Mans Ek	3:34
5.	"Me Gustas"	Jacobo Calderón	3:57
6.	"Undercover"	Conor Maynard, Rick Parkhouse, George Tizzard, Camille Purcell	3:14
7.	"Esa Chica Es para Mi"	Peter Dubbelman Loakim, Per Erik Wigelius, Sven Anders Wigelius	3:17
8.	"Kill the Lights"	Adam Young, Cameron Maxwell, Adam Bailey	3:42
9.	"En mi Cabeza"	Peter Wennerberg, Mathias Venge, Alexander Scold, Lina Eriksson	3:44
10.	"Mi Super Estrella"	Abraham Mateo, Jacobo Calderón	3:25
11.	"Más de Mil Años"	Abraham Mateo, Jacobo Calderón	3:48

AM Special Edition includes a remix of "Señorita" and an acoustic version of "Lánzalo" as bonus tracks. It also includes a DVD, featuring a making of and a dance tutorial of Señorita, unreleased footage from his autograph-signing event in Madrid and from his trip to Miami and his performance at the 2013 Premios Juventud Awards. AM was sold on iTunes with a remix of "Kill the Lights" as bonus.

== Charts ==
=== Weekly charts ===
Charts (2013)	Peak position
Spain Top 100 Albums	6

=== Year-end charts ===
Chart (2013)	Position
Spanish Albums (PROMUSICAE)	41

Chart (2014)	Position
Spanish Albums (PROMUSICAE)	49

=== Singles ===
Year	Single	Peak chart positions
Year	Single	SPA
2012	"Señorita"	3
2013	"Girlfriend"	15
2014	"Lánzalo"	2

== Certifications ==
Region	Certification	Certified units/sales
Spain (PROMUSICAE)	Gold	20,000^{^}
^{^} Shipments figures based on certification alone.
