= Laura Pausini (1994 album) =

Studio album by Laura Pausini
- Released: November 22, 1994
- Recorded: Santanna Recording Studios; Castelfranco Emilia, Modena, Italy; Morning Studio; Milan, Italy; Logic Audiofile Studio; Milan, Italy
- Genre: Latin pop; adult contemporary
- Length: 42:18
- Language: Spanish
- Label: CGD
- Producer: Angelo Valsiglio; Marco Marati

Laura Pausini chronology
Laura (1994)	Laura Pausini (1994)	Laura Pausini (1995)

Singles from Laura
- 1. "La soledad" Released: 1994; 2. "Se Fué" Released: 1994; 3. "Amores extraños" Released: 1994; 4. "Gente" Released: 1995; 5. "Él no está por ti" Released: 1995

Laura Pausini is the third studio album and Spanish-language debut album by Italian singer Laura Pausini, released on November 22, 1994 by CGD (Warner) Records. This album serves as a Spanish counterpart to Pausini’s first two Italian albums, Laura Pausini (1993) and Laura (1994), although it consists of selected tracks and greatest hits from both albums.

To celebrate the 25th anniversary of the album, a special box was released exclusively in Spain on November 8, 2019, which consists of the standard album with two bonus tracks: "Besos que se Roban", Spanish version of "Baci che si rubano" and a 2013 medley: "La Solitudine / La Soledad / Loneliness", a second disc with the 10 Italian original versions, a third disc with alternative and live versions, a DVD of a 1995 TV special called Un Año de Éxito, the album in 180-g translucent vinyl format, a 36-page booklet with texts by the singer and Risto Mejide, and never-seen photographic material.

== Track listing ==
All Spanish adaptations by J. Badía, with additional English adaptation by Tim Rice in "Loneliness".

No.	Title	Length
1.	"Gente"	4:30
2.	"Él no está por ti"	3:45
3.	"Amores extraños"	4:10
4.	"Las chicas"	4:30
5.	"El valor que no se ve"	4:35
6.	"La soledad"	4:04
7.	"¿Por qué no volverán?"	4:10
8.	"Se Fué"	4:40
9.	"¿Por qué no?"	4:02
10.	"Carta"	3:45
Total length:		42:18

25th Anniversary edition bonus tracks
No.	Title	Length
11.	"Besos que se Roban"	4:00
12.	"La Solitudine / La Soledad / Loneliness" (2013 Medley)	4:00
Total length:		50:18

CD #2: Laura Pausini (25th Anniversary – Italian)
No.	Title	Writer(s)	Length
1.	"Gente"	Angelo Valsiglio; Cheope; Marco Marati	4:30
2.	"Lui Non Sta Con Te"	A. Valsiglio; Roberto Buti; Cheope; M. Marati	3:45
3.	"Strani Amori"	A. Valsiglio; R. Buti; Cheope; M. Marati	4:10
4.	"Ragazze Che"	A. Valsiglio; R. Buti; Cheope; M. Marati	4:30
5.	"Il Coraggio Che Non C'è"	A. Valsiglio; Cheope; M. Marati	4:35
6.	"La Solitudine"	Pietro Cremonesi; A. Valsiglio; Federico Cavalli	4:04
7.	"Perchè Non Torna Più"	P. Cremonesi; A. Valsiglio; F. Cavalli	4:10
8.	"Non C'è"	P. Cremonesi; A. Valsiglio; F. Cavalli	4:40
9.	"Tutt'al Più"	P. Cremonesi; A. Valsiglio; F. Cavalli; Roberto Casini	4:02
10.	"Lettera"	A. Valsiglio; Giovanni Salvatori; Cheope; M. Marati	3:45
Total length:			42:18

CD #3: Laura Pausini (25th Anniversary – Alternative and Live Versions)
No.	Title	Length
1.	"La Soledad" (Version 2001)	4:23
2.	"Se Fue" (New Version 2001)	4:16
3.	"Gente (Ordinary People)" (New Version 2001)	4:38
4.	"Amores Extraños" (New Version 2001)	4:17
5.	"La Soledad" (New Version 2013) (featuring Ennio Morricone)	5:03
6.	"Se Fué" (New Version 2013) (featuring Marc Anthony)	3:48
7.	"Gente" (New Version 2013)	4:31
8.	"Amores Extraños" (New Version 2013)	4:58
9.	"La solitudine (Loneliness)"	4:00
10.	"Gente" (Live San Siro 2007)	3:50
11.	"Amores Extraños" (Live New York, 16 October 2009)	4:21
12.	"La Soledad" (Live Barcelona, 30 April 2009)	5:07
13.	"Se Fué" (Live Paris, 2005)	6:27
Total length:		59:39

DVD: Un Año de Éxito
No.	Title	Length
1.	"Un Año de Éxito"

== Charts ==
Chart (1994–1995)	Peak position
Colombian Albums Chart	1
Spanish Albums Chart	1
US Top Latin Albums	31
US Latin Pop Albums	10

=== Year-end charts ===
Chart (1994)	Position
Spanish Albums Chart	1
Chart (1995)	Position
Spanish Albums Chart	3

== Certifications ==
Region	Certification	Certified units/sales
Argentina (CAPIF)	Platinum	60,000^{^}
Chile (IFPI Chile)	Platinum	25,000^{^}
Colombia (ASINCOL)	Platinum	60,000^{x}
Mexico (AMPROFON)	4× Gold	400,000
Spain (PROMUSICAE)	11× Platinum	1,300,000
Summaries
Europe (IFPI)	Platinum	1,000,000^{*}
^{*} Sales figures based on certification alone.^{^} Shipments figures based on certification alone.

== Personnel ==
=== Performing ===
- Laura Pausini – vocals
- Emanuela Cortesi – backing vocals
- Silvia Mezzanotte – backing vocals
- Cristina Montanari – backing vocals
- Leonardo Abbate – backing vocals
- Danilo Bastoni – backing vocals
- Gianni Salvatori – backing vocals, acoustic/electric guitar, arrangement
- Riccardo Galardini – acoustic/electric guitar
- Cesare Chiodo – bass
- Stefano Allegra – bass
- Massimo Pacciani – drums/percussion
- Simone Papi – piano, programming
- Luca Signorini – saxophone

=== Technical ===
- Arcangelo Valsiglio – artistic production
- Marco Marati – executive production
- Alfredo Cerruti – artistic production assistance
- Fabrizio Pausini – executive production assistance
- Santanna Recording Studio
  - Danilo Bastoni – studio director
  - Gianni Salvatori – sound recording
  - Sandro Chinellato – sound recording
- Morning Studio
  - Renato Cantele – sound recording
  - Giamba Lizzori – sound recording

=== Design ===
- Byblos – wardrobe
- Luciano Viti – photography
- Stefania Tranchino – make-up
- Fabrizio Betty by I Maretti – hairdressing

== See also ==
- List of best-selling Latin albums
- List of best-selling albums in Spain
