= Loco Enamorado =

Single by Abraham Mateo, Farruko and Christian Daniel

from the album A Cámara Lenta
- Released: 23 June 2017
- Genre: Latin pop; reggaeton
- Length: 4:12
- Label: Sony Spain
- Songwriters: Abraham Mateo; Carlos Efren Reyes Rosado; Víctor Viera Moore; Edgar Barrera; Juan G Riversa

Abraham Mateo singles chronology
"Mi Vecina" (2016)	"Loco Enamorado" (2017)	"Háblame Bajito" (2017)

Music video
- "Loco Enamorado" on YouTube

"Loco Enamorado" (English: "Crazy Lover") is a song recorded by Spanish singer Abraham Mateo and Puerto Rican singers Farruko and Christian Daniel. It was originally released on June 23, 2017, through Sony Music, as the lead single from Mateo's fifth studio album, A Cámara Lenta. It was written by Abraham Mateo and Edgar Barrera, produced by urban music producer Jumbo and mixed by Gaby Music. The song is Abraham Mateo's first single to chart on the US Billboard's Hot Latin Songs, where it charted for 14 weeks and peaked at number 22.

== Track listings ==
- Digital download
1. "Loco Enamorado" – 4:32

== Music video ==
The music video for "Loco Enamorado" was released on 20 July 2017, on Abraham Mateo's Vevo YouTube channel. The music video was shot on 14 June 2017 at the popular Wynwood area in Miami under the direction by Mike Ho with executive production by Jessy Terrero and photography direction by Joseph Labisi.

As of January 2018, the video has been viewed more than 382.977.143 times.

== Live performances ==
Abraham Mateo's first televised performance of "Loco Enamorado" was at the popular Argentine television show Susana Giménez on October 16, 2017. He also performed at the 2017 Kids' Choice Awards Argentina. On October 26, 2017, Mateo performed the song with Farruko and Christian Daniel during the 2017 Latin American Music Awards at Dolby Theatre in Hollywood, California. On November 4, 2017, Mateo performed "Loco Enamorado" at a sold-out Luna Park Stadium, in Buenos Aires, Argentina. On November 5, 2017, Mateo and Farruko performed the song in front of 60,000 people during the 2017 Festival Presidente at Estadio Olímpico Félix Sánchez in the Dominican Republic. On November 8, 2017, Mateo sang "Loco Enamorado" during the 2017 Telehit Awards at Palacio de los Deportes in Mexico City. On December 2, 2017, Mateo performed the single at the charity event The Teleton, in Guayaquil, Ecuador.

== Charts ==
=== Weekly charts ===
Chart (2017)	Peak position
Argentina (Monitor Latino)	14
Bolivia (Monitor Latino)	11
Colombia (National-Report)	19
Costa Rica (Monitor Latino)	4
Dominican Republic (Monitor Latino)	11
Ecuador (National-Report)	8
Ecuador (Monitor Latino)	13
El Salvador (Monitor Latino)	12
Guatemala (Monitor Latino)	8
Latin America (Monitor Latino)	13
Mexico Airplay (Billboard)	22
Nicaragua (Monitor Latino)	12
Peru (Monitor Latino)	7
Spain (PROMUSICAE)	13
Uruguay (Monitor Latino)	3
US Hot Latin Songs (Billboard)	22
US Latin Airplay (Billboard)	12
US Latin Rhythm Airplay (Billboard)	8
Venezuela (National-Report)	40

=== Year-end charts ===
Chart (2017)	Position
Argentina (Monitor Latino)	97
Bolivia (Monitor Latino)	56
Ecuador (Monitor Latino)	79
El Salvador (Monitor Latino)	29
Guatemala (Monitor Latino)	52
Nicaragua (Monitor Latino)	15
Uruguay (Monitor Latino)	44
Peru (Monitor Latino)	42
Spain (PROMUSICAE)	49

Chart (2018)	Position
Argentina (Monitor Latino)	72
US Hot Latin Songs (Billboard)	87

== Certifications ==
Region	Certification	Certified units/sales
Argentina (CAPIF)	Platinum	
Chile	Platinum	
Colombia	Gold	
Mexico (AMPROFON)	3× Platinum	180,000^{‡}
Peru	Gold	
Spain (Promusicae)	2× Platinum	80,000^{‡}
United States (RIAA)	4× Platinum (Latin)	240,000^{‡}
^{‡} Sales+streaming figures based on certification alone.
