= Abraham Mateo (album) =

Studio album by Abraham Mateo
- Released: December 4, 2009 (Spain)
- Recorded: 2009 (Madrid)
- Genre: Latin pop
- Length: 44:06
- Label: EMI Music Spain
- Producers: Jacobo Calderón, José Luis de la Peña

Abraham Mateo chronology
Abraham Mateo (2009)	AM (2013)

Singles from Abraham Mateo
- 1. "Vuelve conmigo" Released: December 1, 2009

Abraham Mateo is the debut studio album by Spanish singer Abraham Mateo, released on December 4, 2009, by EMI Music Spain. The album was recorded in Madrid and has a total running time of 44:06. The album was produced by Jacobo Calderón and José Luis de la Peña.

== Background ==
In 2009, representatives from EMI Music Spain invited Mateo to record the album. He signed the deal and recorded the album in Summer of 2009 at the EMI Music Studio in Madrid.

== Composition ==
The album contains twelve tracks, with Jacobo Calderón composing seven of the 12 songs. The rest were version of other well-known Latin music.

== Promotion ==
Mateo performed the album at several places including Madrid, the Canary Islands, Valencia, Galicia and Andalusia. He also went on a media tour including appearing in the shows You are worth it and The María Teresa Campos show.

== Track listing ==
Track listing
No.	Title	Lead vocals	Length
1.	"Vuelve conmigo"	Abraham Mateo	3:20
2.	"Destronado"	Abraham Mateo	3:51
3.	"Los dos cogidos de la mano"	Abraham Mateo	5:14
4.	"Un amor como los de antes"	Abraham Mateo	3:47
5.	"Magia"	Abraham Mateo	4:05
6.	"Imagíname sin ti"	Abraham Mateo	4:08
7.	"Volvería"	Abraham Mateo	3:20
8.	"Without You"	Abraham Mateo feat. Caroline Costa	3:52
9.	"Lágrimas de amor"	Abraham Mateo	3:52
10.	"Te amaré"	Abraham Mateo	3:45
11.	"La soledad"	Abraham Mateo	3:48
12.	"La soledad"	Abraham Mateo	4:05
13.	"Cuando tú no estás"	Abraham Mateo	3:44

50:51
