= Strani amori =

Single by Laura Pausini

from the album Laura
- B-side: "Amores extraños" (Spanish version)
- Released: February 1994
- Genre: Pop
- Length: 4:17
- Label: CGD
- Songwriters: Angelo Valsiglio, Roberto Buti, Cheope, Marco Marati and Francesco Tanini
- Producer: Marco Marati

Laura Pausini singles chronology
"Perché non-torna più" (1993)	"Strani amori" (1994)	"Gente" (1994)

Music video
- "Strani amori" on YouTube

"Strani amori'" (English: Strange loves) is a song by Italian singer Laura Pausini, released in February 1994 as the first single from her second studio album, Laura.

Written by Angelo Valsiglio, Roberto Buti, Cheope, Marco Marati and Francesco Tanini, the song was first performed by Laura Pausini during the 44th Sanremo Music Festival in February 1994, where it placed third in a field of twenty, behind Aleandro Baldi's "Passerà" and Giorgio Faletti's "Signor tenente".

The song was later translated in Spanish and included in Pausini's self-titled compilation album, released in 1994 for the Hispanic market. This version of the song, titled "Amores extraños", peaked at number one on the Billboard Latin Pop Songs chart.

Both "Strani amori" and "Amores extraños" were re-recorded for Pausini's 2001 compilation album The Best of Laura Pausini: E ritorno da te / Lo mejor de Laura Pausini – Volveré junto a ti and for her 2013 compilation album 20 – The Greatest Hits / 20 – Grandes Éxitos.

== Cover version ==
After its release, in 1994, Brazilian singer Renato Russo recorded a cover version of the song for his album Equilíbrio distante. Years after Russo's death, in 2010, Laura re-recorded the song and mixed it with the old original Russo cover version, in the posthumous release Renato Russo: Duetos.

In 1994, Puerto Rican singer Olga Tañón included a cover of "Amores extraños" on her album Siente el amor.... In 1995, the song was also recorded by Rubby Perez for his self-titled album. His version of the song peaked at number 15 on the Billboard Latin Tropical Airplay chart.

== Track listings ==
CD Single – Germany (CGD – 4509 95574 2)
No.	Title	Writer(s)	Length
1.	"Strani amori"	Angelo Valsiglio, Roberto Buti, Cheope, Marco Marati, Francesco Tanini	4:10
2.	"Strani amori" (Instrumental)	Angelo Valsiglio, Roberto Buti, Cheope, Marco Marati, Francesco Tanini	4:10

== Charts ==
=== Weekly charts ===
==== "Strani amori" ====
Chart (1994–1995)	Peak position
Belgium (Ultratop 50 Flanders)	2
France (SNEP)	43
Italy (Musica e dischi)	2
Netherlands (Dutch Top 40)	5
Netherlands (Single Top 100)	4

==== "Amores extraños" ====
Chart (1994–1995)	Peak position
Chile (UPI)	1
El Salvador (UPI)	9
Mexico (AMPROFON)	2
Panama (UPI)	1
Peru (UPI)	4
Puerto Rico (UPI)	2
US Hot Latin Songs (Billboard)	7
US Latin Pop Airplay (Billboard)	1
US Tropical Songs (Billboard)	8

=== Year-end charts ===
==== "Strani amori" ====
Chart (1994)	Position
Belgium (Ultratop Flanders)	15
Netherlands (Dutch Top 40)	17
Netherlands (Single Top 100)	41

==== "Amores extraños" ====
Chart (1995)	Position
US Latin Pop Airplay (Billboard)	12

== Certifications ==
Region	Certification	Certified units/sales
Italy (FIMI) Since 2009	Gold	35,000^{‡}
^{‡} Sales+streaming figures based on certification alone.
