= Christian Daniel =

Puerto Rican singer-songwriter

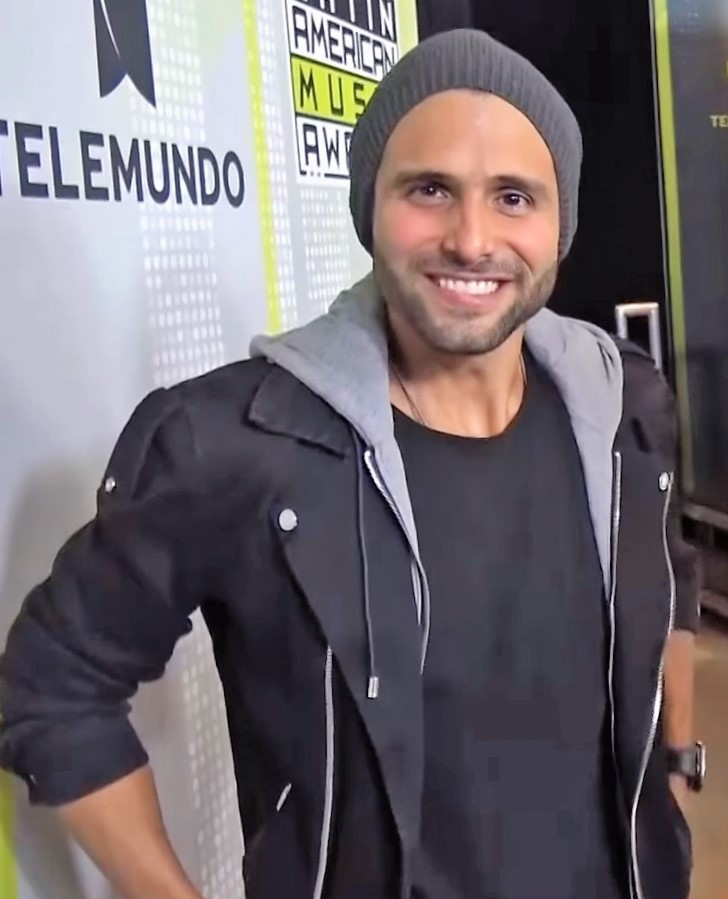
- Daniel interviewed by Dulce Osuna in 2018
- Born: March 20, 1984 (age 42); Santurce, San Juan, Puerto Rico
- Occupations: Singer; songwriter
- Years active: 2007–present
- Musical career
- Genres: Latin pop; reggaeton
- Instrument: Vocals
- Labels: Bad Boy Latino; Sony Music Latin
- Website: christiandanielmusic.com

Christian Daniel (born March 20, 1984) is a Puerto Rican singer-songwriter.

== Early life ==
Daniel was born in 1984 in Santurce, San Juan, Puerto Rico, to a Puerto Rican mother and a Cuban father from Pinar del Río, Cuba.

== Career ==
Daniel is a singer-songwriter. At the age of 17, Daniel recorded his first demo with vocal coach Socky Torres. He sent demos to several recording companies until Emilio Estefan invited him to Miami to record his début album, Christian Daniel (2007). He was the first artist signed to the record label Bad Boy Latino. Several of his songs have charted on various Billboard charts. As of 2015, he has released three studio albums. In addition to music, Daniel has also acted in Telemundo telenovelas including El fantasma de Elena and Santa Diabla.

== Personal life ==
Daniel moved from Puerto Rico to Miami circa 2007.

== Awards ==
Daniel was a finalist in the 2016 Latin Billboard Music Awards for Solo Latin Pop Songs Artist of the Year and Latin Pop Song of the Year for his song "Ahora Que Te Vas." In 2017, he was nominated for the category Best Latin Artist by IHeartRadio Music Awards.

== Discography ==
=== Albums ===
- Christian Daniel (2007)
- Todo lo Que Tengo (2011)
- Renacer (2015)

=== Singles ===
- Loco Enamorado (2017)
