= La solitudine =

1993 single by Laura Pausini

Single by Laura Pausini

from the album Laura Pausini
- Released: 26 February 1993
- Recorded: Santanna (Castelfranco Emilia, Modena)
- Length: 4:04
- Label: CGD
- Songwriters: Angelo Valsiglio, Pietro Cremonesi, Federico Cavalli
- Producer: Angelo Valsiglio

Laura Pausini singles chronology
"La solitudine" (1993)	"Non c'è" (1993)

Audio sample
- file; help

Music videos
- "La solitudine" on YouTube

"La solitudine" ("The Loneliness") is a song by Italian pop singer Laura Pausini, released as her debut single by CGD in February 1993. Pausini sang it for the first time on 23 February 1993, during the 43rd Sanremo Music Festival. On 27 February 1993, the song was announced the winner of the competition in the newcomers' section, receiving 7,464 votes. The single reached number five on the Italian Musica e dischi Singles Chart and later became an Italian standard. A few months after its original release, "La solitudine" was included in Pausini's self-titled first album, released on 18 May 1993.

In late 1993, following the success achieved in Italy, the single was released in the rest of Europe, topping the Dutch Top 40 Singles Chart and the Belgian VRT Top 30 Singles Chart, and reaching the top five in France. Pausini also recorded the song in Spanish, with the title "La soledad", and in English, with lyrics adapted by Tim Rice and re-titled as "La solitudine (Loneliness)". These versions of the song were released as part of her first Spanish-language album, Laura Pausini, and as the lead single from a self-titled compilation album released in the United Kingdom in 1995, respectively.

Pausini re-recorded the song several times. A slower, more dramatic version with live instrumentation was featured on her 2001 compilation album The Best of Laura Pausini: E ritorno da te. The same arrangement was used for the new version of the Spanish counterpart of the song, included in Lo mejor de Laura Pausini: Volveré junto a ti. On 26 February 2013, to celebrate its 20th anniversary, Pausini released a digital single titled "La solitudine / La soledad / Loneliness", which combined lyrics from the Italian, Spanish and English versions of the song. Pausini's greatest-hits album 20 – The Greatest Hits also featured a new recording of "La solitudine", with arrangements by Ennio Morricone.

== Background and composition ==
Federico Cavalli and Pietro Cremonesi, who at the time were two songwriters with daytime jobs outside the music business, wrote the lyrics and the music of the original version of the song, respectively. Angelo Valsiglio also contributed writing both the lyrics and the music of "La solitudine".

The lyrics to the Italian version of the song are about a boy named Marco, who is separated from his girlfriend at the urging of his family and sent to live far away from her. The now former girlfriend makes an emotional and heartfelt plea, singing to him about the loneliness and pain they would feel without each other.

Interviewed by Italian journalist Gianni Minà, Pausini declared that the song is strongly autobiographical:

"In the beginning the song started with the words 'Anna se n'è andata' [Anna went away] instead of 'Marco se n'è andato'. But the rest of the story was exactly the photograph of my life until that moment [...]. I had never met those two authors before and, even if Valsiglio and the other composers continued to give me new songs, I told my father that I wanted to sing that one only, just changing the name to Marco, because the development of the song looked to be a copy of what was happening to me. Marco was my boyfriend in the same period, and this is why, when I was singing that song, I was feeling moved."

The English-language version of the song, adapted by Tim Rice doesn't contain any reference to Marco, but has a similar meaning. Instead of revolving around a high school sweetheart who has moved far away, the storyline focuses on a short intense summer love."

According to Univision's Fabiana Steinmander, Laura Pausini's "La solitudine" is a song "with a high degree of difficulty because of the number of vocal transitions and the modulation it demands of its singer".

== Music video ==
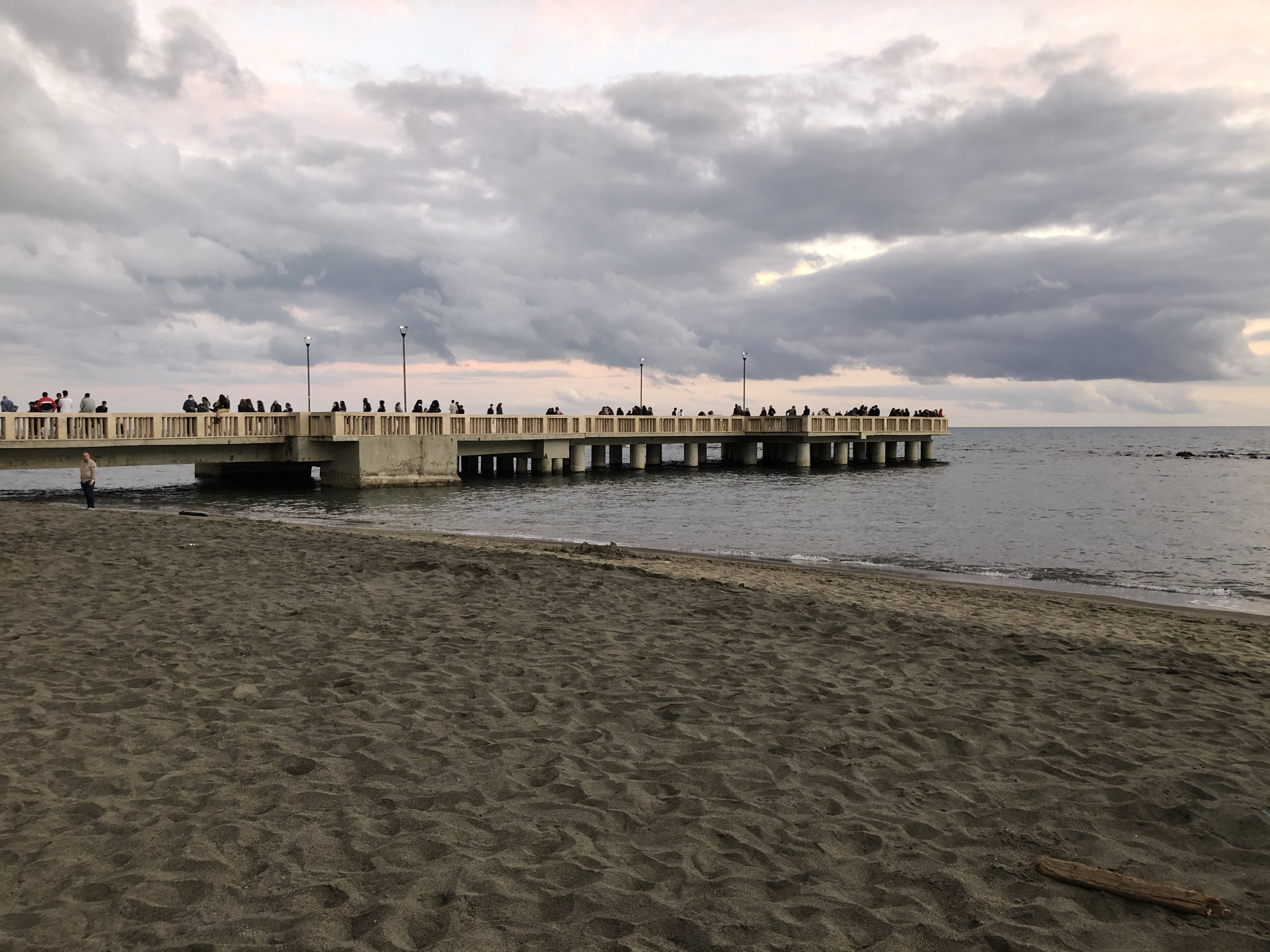
The music video for "La solitudine" was shot at the Ostia jetty

An Italian-language and a Spanish-language music video for the song, both directed by Ambrogio Lo Giudice, were shot on the Ostia jetty. Pausini is shown while playing with German shepherd puppies on the beachside. Over the years, the video's setting was used several times by Pausini and her fans to celebrate her career, as a symbol of her first hit song. Both versions of the video were included on Video Collection 93–99, Pausini's first video compilation, released in 1999.

== Reception ==
=== Critical reception ===
The song received mixed to negative reviews by Italian music critics. According to la Repubblica's Gino Castaldo, "La solitudine" is not a great song, but Pausini "seduced with her voice and her authentic determination". La Stampa's Marinella Venegoni wrote that, due to "La solitudine"'s "whimpering sadness", Pausini can be compared to Italian singer Marco Masini. Venegoni later described it as an immature teen-song. Mario Luzzatto Fegiz and Gloria Pozzi wrote on the Italian newspaper Corriere della Sera that "La solitudine" initially looked to be a typical song built for the Sanremo Music Festival, but it is "a song without make-up, perfectly in tune with its interpret".

=== Chart performance ===
The song became a big hit in Italy, reaching number five on Musica e dischi's single chart in April 1993. The song was later released in the rest of Europe, reaching the top of the Belgian Singles Chart and peaking at number five on the French Singles Chart, where it scored 44 non-consecutive weeks in the Top 50. It also became a hit in the Netherlands, where it reached the top spot of the Dutch Top 40 and it peaked for four consecutive weeks at number two on the Dutch Mega Single Top 100. Since Paul de Leeuw's version of the song, "Ik wil niet dat je liegt", topped the chart during Pausini's second week in the runner-up spot, "La solitudine" became the second song in the Dutch chart's history to chart within the top 3 with two different versions at the same time. The single was also certified Platinum by the NVPI, denoting shipments in the Netherlands exceeding 75,000 copies.

During 1994, the Spanish-language version of the song charted in the United States at number 22 on the Billboard Hot Latin Songs and at number five on the Billboard Latin Pop Songs, while the English-language version, "La solitudine (Loneliness)", released on 19 June 1995 in the United Kingdom only, failed to chart on the UK Singles Chart.

A new version of the song, featured on her 2001's best of album, was released as a double A-side with "Tra te e il mare" in France. In February 2002, the single reached number 16 on the French Singles Chart.

== Live performances ==
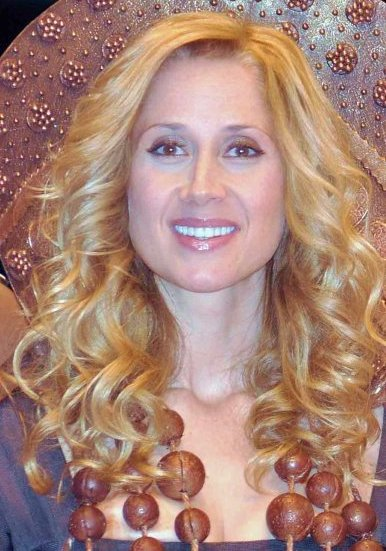
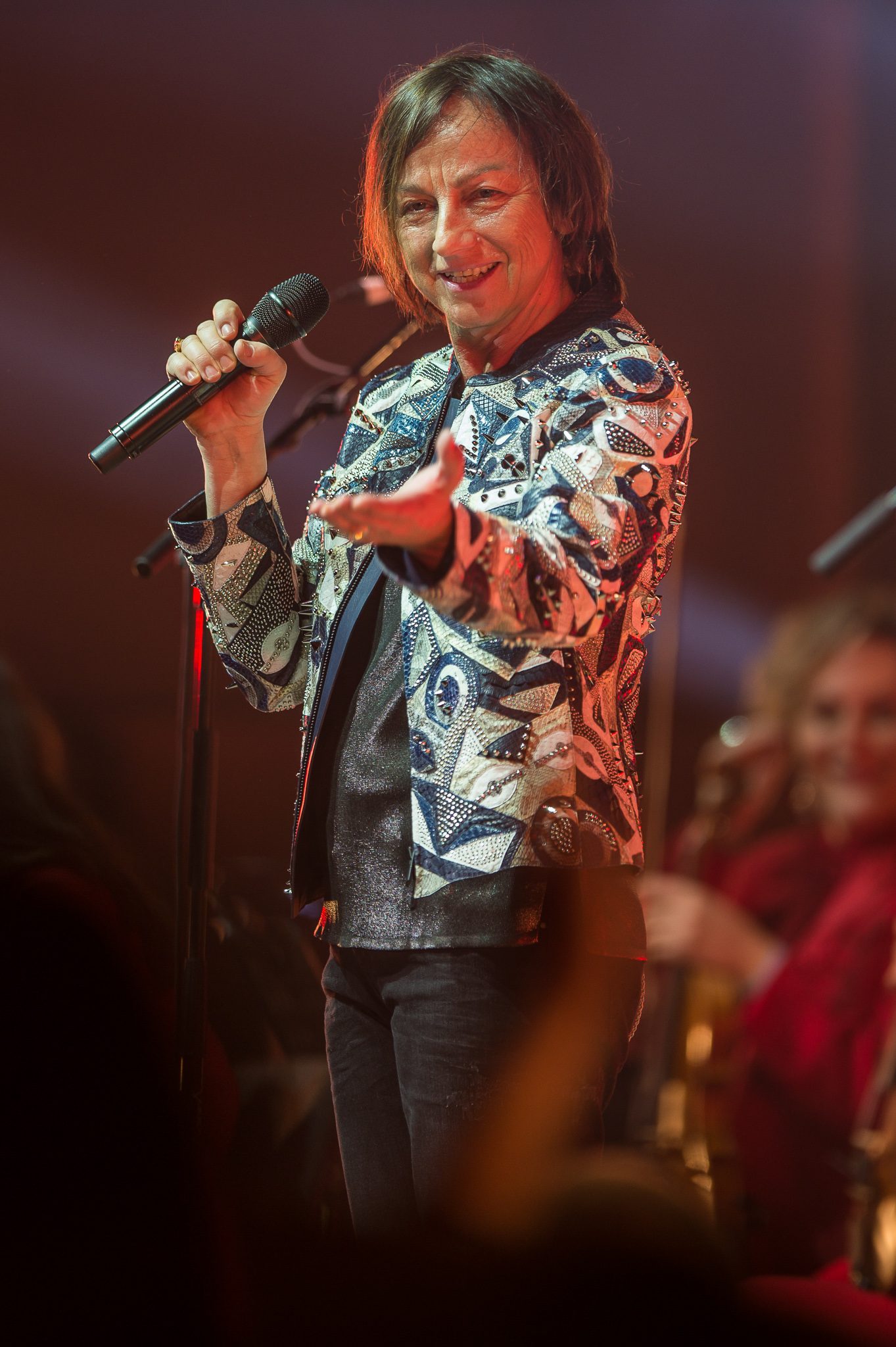
Lara Fabian (left) and Gianna Nannini (right) are among the artists who dueted with Laura Pausini on live versions of "La solitudine".

Laura Pausini performed the song live for the first time on 23 February 1993, competing in the newcomers' section of the 43rd Sanremo Music Festival, broadcast by Italian TV station Rai 1. The song was also performed during Pausini's Italian tour in 1993, to promote her debut self-titled album. "La solitudine" was later performed by Pausini at the Sanremo Music Festival in 2001 and in 2006, when she appeared as a musical guest.

A live performance of the song was included in Pausini's first DVD, Live 2001–2002 World Tour, recorded at Mediolanum Forum in Milan on 2 December 2001, as well as in 2005's Live in Paris, recorded at the Zénith de Paris, and in San Siro 2007, recorded on 2 June 2007, when Pausini was the first woman to sing in the Stadio Giuseppe Meazza.

In 2002 Pausini dueted with Lara Fabian, singing "La solitudine" during a French TV show recorded in Rome. On 21 June 2009, Pausini performed the song live with Italian rock singer Gianna Nannini, during the mega-concert Amiche per l'Abruzzo, involving the most important Italian female singers and organized to raise money to support the victims of the 2009 L'Aquila earthquake. The performance was also included in the DVD Amiche per l'Abruzzo, released on 22 June 2010.

In 2009 Pausini released her third live album, Laura Live World Tour 09, including a performance of "La solitudine" recorded in Naples. The Spanish version of the album, Laura Live Gira Mundial 09, features a recording of the song performed in Barcelona.

The Italian and Spanish versions of the song have been performed by Pausini in all of her concert tours up to The Greatest Hits World Tour. In 2016, during Pausini and Cortellesi's TV show Laura & Paola, Pausini performed an accelerated and compressed version of the song with comedy band Elio e le Storie Tese. Pausini and Cortellesi also dueted on "La solitudine" during Pausini's concert at the Stadio Olimpico in Rome in 2016.

== Covers ==
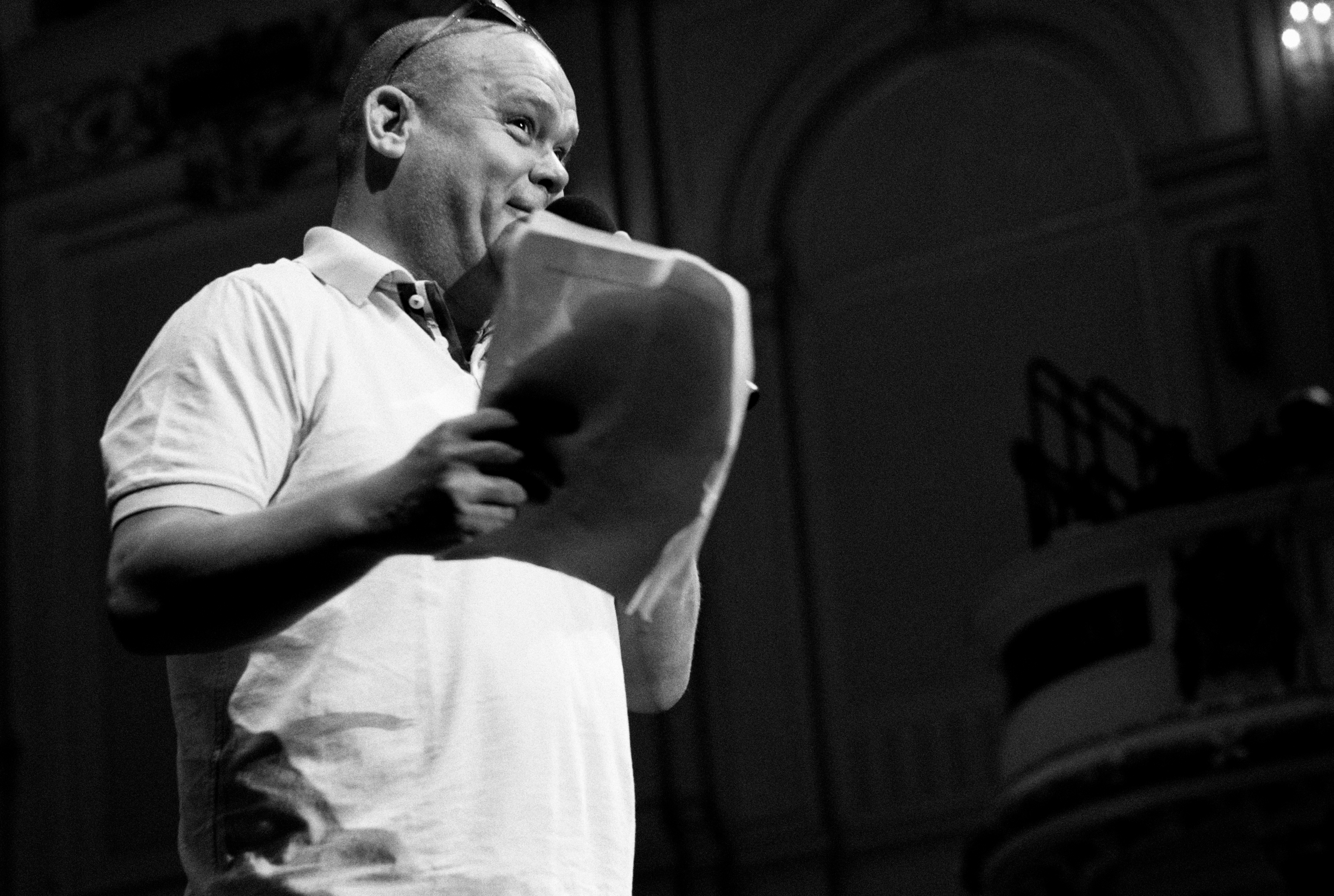
Dutch TV presenter and comedian Paul de Leeuw recorded a Dutch-language version of "La solitudine", "Ik wil niet dat je liegt", which topped the charts in the Netherlands.

In 1996, it was covered by Dutch jazz saxophonist, Herman Schoonderwalt which is the last work before his death.

In 1994, Thanos Kalliris recorded a Greek version of the song, titled "Το Νου σου κύριε Οδηγέ". In the same year Paul de Leeuw recorded a Dutch language version of "La solitudine", with the title "Ik wil niet dat je liegt" (English translation: I don't want you to lie). Filipino singer Ivy Violan also recorded a Filipino language version of the song, adapted by Alvina Sy with the title "Hanggang Ngayon" for her 1998's album with the same title.

In 1994, Brazilian singer Renato Russo recorded a cover of the Italian-language version of the song for his album Equilíbrio distante. After his death, a posthumous duet with Leila Pinheiro was included in his album Duetos. The English version of the song was covered by German pop singer Jamie Stevens and included in his 2002 album Unbreakable. The Spanish singer Abraham Mateo included a cover of "La soledad" in his self-titled debut album.

Cuban timba group Bamboleo recorded a salsa version of "La soledad" for their 1996 album Te gusto o te caigo bien. A year later, DLG followed suit, recording a salsa version of "La soledad" for their 1997 album Swing On. Lead singer Huey Dunbar removed the reference to "Marco" and replaced it with "ella" (she). DLG's version also adds a spoken reggae bridge to the song, in which the woman Dunbar is singing to responds to his plea and vows to return.

In 2014, the song was performed live by Teodora Sava when she was 12 years old, in duet with Paula Seling, as special guests of the Romanian kids talent show Next Star. In 2014, French singer of Italian origin Nyco Lilliu covered the song in Italian. The track is included in the compilation album Latin Lovers. Lilliu also released a music video for the song, but it was not an official single for him.

== Media usage ==
"La solitudine" was part of the soundtrack of 1994 Italian documentary film Utopia, utopia, per piccina che tu sia, directed by Umberto Marino and Dominick Tambasco. During the same year, the Spanish-language version of the song became the opening theme of Colombian TV seriese Clase aparte. The song was chosen for a TV commercial promoting the Sanremo Music Festival 2013, in which presenter Luciana Littizzetto sings "La solitudine" while traveling in a subway train. In 2019, the song was featured on the French supernatural TV series Mortel.

In 2023, Italian rappers Tedua and Capo Plaza released the song "Parole vuote (La solitudine)", which features a sample of a re-recorded version of "La solitudine", with vocals by Domitilla Abeasis. A fragment of the song previously appeared on Tedua's social media accounts, but he revealed that the song could not be released due to an unreached agreement on the usage of the sample of Pausini's song. The song reached number three on the Italian FIMI Singles chart.

== Credits and personnel ==
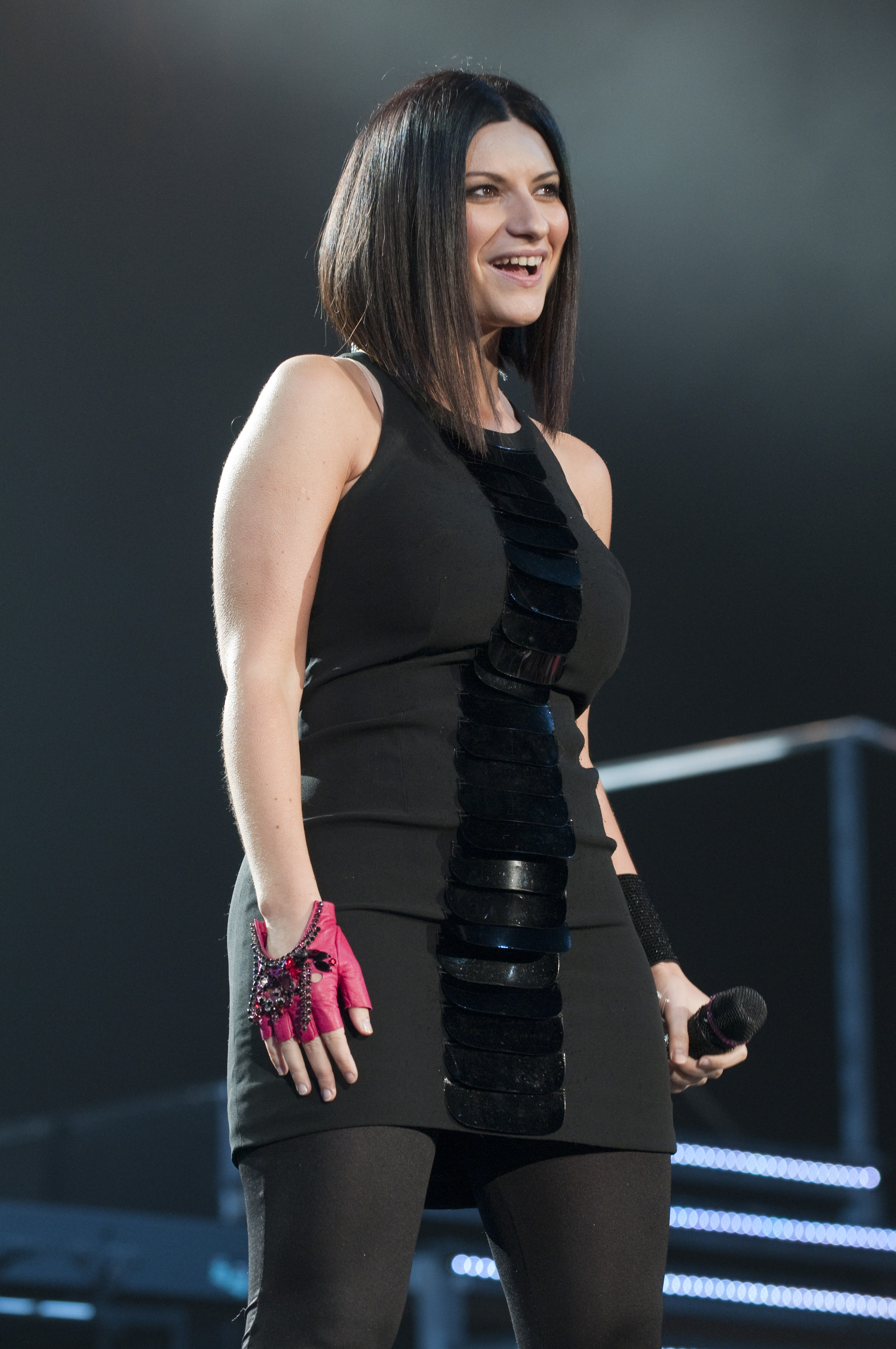
Laura Pausini

Credits are taken from Laura Pausini liner notes.

- Stefano Allegra – bass
- Eric Buffat – piano, programming, background vocals
- Federico Cavalli – composer
- Sandro Chinellato – engineer
- Pietro Cremonesi – composer
- Riccardo Galardini – acoustic guitar
- Marco Marati – executive producer
- Silvia Mezzanotte – background vocals
- Cristina Montanari – background vocals
- Massimo Pacciani – drums
- Laura Pausini – vocals
- Gianni Salvatori – arranger, engineer, electric guitar, background vocals
- Angelo Valsiglio – composer, executive producer, arranger

== Track listings ==
"La solitudine" – Italy (1993) – CD maxi (CGD 4509-92071-2)

1. "La solitudine" – 4:04
2. "La solitudine" (Instrumental version) – 4:04

"La solitudine" – Germany (1994) – Maxi single (EastWest 4509-95956-2)

1. "La solitudine" – 4:04
2. "La soledad" (Spanish-language version) – 4:04
3. "La solitudine" (Instrumental version) – 4:04

"La soledad" – Spain, United States and Latin America (1994)

1. "La soledad" (Spanish-language version) – 3:58
2. "La solitudine" (Original Italian-language version) – 3:56
3. "La solitudine" (Instrumental version) – 3:57

"La solitudine (Loneliness)" – United Kingdom (1995) – CD single (EastWest Records GmbH 4509-99006-2)

1. "La solitudine (Loneliness)" (English-language version) – 3:58
2. "La solitudine" (Original Italian Version) – 3:56
3. "La solitudine" (Instrumental) – 3:57

== Charts ==
=== Weekly charts ===
==== "La solitudine" ====
Chart (1993–1994)	Peak position
Belgium (Ultratop 50 Flanders)	1
France (SNEP)	5
Italy (Musica e dischi)	5
Netherlands (Dutch Top 40)	1
Netherlands (Single Top 100)	2

==== "La soledad" ====
Chart (1994–1995)	Peak position
El Salvador (UPI)	1
Panama (UPI)	1
US Hot Latin Songs (Billboard)	22
US Latin Pop Songs (Billboard)	5
US Tropical Songs (Billboard)	11
Venezuela (UPI)	1

==== "La solitudine / La soledad / Loneliness (Medley 2013)" ====
Chart (2013)	Peak position
US World Digital Song Sales (Billboard)	19

=== Year-end charts ===
==== "La solitudine" ====
Chart (1993)	Position
Netherlands (Dutch Top 40)	99

Chart (1994)	Position
Belgium (Ultratop 50 Flanders)	4
France (SNEP)	13
Netherlands (Dutch Top 40)	20
Netherlands (Single Top 100)	14

=== Decade-end charts ===
==== "La solitudine" ====
Chart (1990–1999)	Position
Belgium (Ultratop Flanders)	13
Netherlands (Dutch Top 40)	54

== Certifications ==
Region	Certification	Certified units/sales
Italy (FIMI)	Platinum	100,000^{‡}
Netherlands (NVPI)	Platinum	75,000^{^}
^{^} Shipments figures based on certification alone.^{‡} Sales+streaming figures based on certification alone.
