= Laura Pausini (1993 album) =

Studio album by Laura Pausini
- Released: May 18, 1993
- Studios: Santanna Recording Studios, Castelfranco Emilia
- Genres: Italian pop; Adult contemporary
- Length: 36:43
- Language: Italian
- Label: CGD
- Producers: Angelo Valsiglio; Marco Marati

Laura Pausini chronology
Laura Pausini (1993)	Laura (1994)

Alternative cover
- French pressing of Laura Pausini

Singles from Laura Pausini
- 1. "La solitudine" Released: February 1993; 2. "Non c'è" Released: June 1993; 3. "Perché non torna più" Released: October 1993; 4. "Tutt'al più" Released: December 1993 (only in Italy, Japan & Slovakia)

Laura Pausini is the self-titled debut album by Italian singer Laura Pausini. It was released in Italy on May 18, 1993 by CGD Records (Warner).

Following the success obtained in Italy, where it sold 400,000 copies, the album was later released in Europe, Australia and Japan. The worldwide sales for the album exceed two million copies.

The first single from the album, "La solitudine", was the winner of the 43rd Sanremo Music Festival in the newcomer artists' section. It reached the top spot in the Italian Singles Chart and later became an Italian standard and an international hit, reaching the charts in different European countries, including Belgium, the Netherlands and France.

== Track listing ==
All tracks are written by Pietro Cremonesi, Angelo Valsiglio and Federico Cavalli, except where noted.

No.	Title	Writer(s)	Length
1.	"Non c'è"		4:40
2.	"Mi rubi l'anima" (featuring Raf)		3:25
3.	"Dove sei"		3:35
4.	"Baci che si rubano"		4:25
5.	"Tutt'al più"	P. Cremonesi; A. Valsiglio; F. Cavalli; Roberto Casini	4:02
6.	"La solitudine"		4:04
7.	"Perché non torna più"		4:10
8.	"Il cuore non si arrende"		4:40

== Charts ==
Chart (1993–1995)	Peak position
Belgian Albums (IFPI)	1
Dutch Albums (Album Top 100)	3
French Albums (SNEP)	35
Italian Albums (Musica e dischi)	3
Portuguese Albums (AFP)	1

== Certifications ==
Region	Certification	Certified units/sales
Argentina (CAPIF)	Gold	30,000^{^}
Belgium (BRMA)	Platinum	50,000^{*}
Brazil (Pro-Música Brasil)	Gold	100,000^{*}
France (SNEP)	Gold	100,000^{*}
Italy (FIMI) Sales since 2009	Gold	25,000^{‡}
Netherlands (NVPI)	Platinum	100,000^{^}
Switzerland (IFPI Switzerland)	Gold	25,000^{^}
^{*} Sales figures based on certification alone.^{^} Shipments figures based on certification alone.^{‡} Sales+streaming figures based on certification alone.
