= Non c'è =

1993 single by Laura Pausini

Single by Laura Pausini

from the album Laura Pausini
- Language: Italian
- B-side: "Perché non torna più"
- Released: 1993
- Studio: Santanna Recording Studios (Castelfranco Emilia, Modena)
- Genre: Pop
- Length: 4:38
- Label: CGD
- Songwriters: Pietro Cremonesi; Angelo Valsiglio; Federico Cavalli

Laura Pausini singles chronology
"La solitudine" (1993)	"Non c'è" (1993)	"Perché non torna più" (1993)

Music video
- "Non c'è" on YouTube

"Se fué"

Single by Laura Pausini featuring Marc Anthony

from the album 20 – The Greatest Hits
- Language: Spanish
- Released: 28 January 2014
- Genre: Salsa
- Label: Warner Music
- Songwriters: Pietro Cremonesi; Angelo Valsiglio; Federico Cavalli; Ignacio Ballesteros
- Producer: Sergio George

Laura Pausini singles chronology
"Viveme" (2013)	"Se fué" (2014)	"Dove resto solo io" (2014)

Marc Anthony singles chronology
"Cambio de piel" (2013)	"Se fue" (2014)	"Cuando nos volvamos a encontrar" (2014)

"Non c'è" (English: It's Not Here) is an Italian ballad written by Pietro Cremonesi, Angelo Valsiglio and Federico Cavalli and recorded by pop singer Laura Pausini. It is the second single from the singer's first album, Laura Pausini. The song was also recorded in Spanish under the title "Se fue" (He's Gone) and included in Pausini's Spanish-language debut album, released in 1994. A remix version of "Se fue" was released in 1994 and became popular in Spanish dance clubs. The song later became one of Pausini's best-known singles.

A new version of the song was also included on the 2001 compilation album The Best of Laura Pausini: E ritorno da te, featuring Italian singer Nek playing bass. The same arrangements were used for the Spanish-language counterpart, "Se fue", included in Lo mejor de Laura Pausini: Volveré junto a ti.

In 2013, Pausini recorded a new version for her 2013 compilation album 20 – The Greatest Hits, featuring American singer Marc Anthony in a salsa style by Sergio George. This version received a nomination for Tropical Collaboration of the Year at the 2015 Lo Nuestro Awards.

The song is widely known as the follow-up to Laura Pausini's first single "La solitudine".

== Track listing ==
CD single (France) – CGD 4509 97173-2
No.	Title	Writer(s)	Length
1.	"Non c'è"	Pietro Cremonesi, Angelo Valsiglio, Federico Cavalli	3:58
2.	"Perché non torna più"	Cremonesi, Valsiglio, Cavalli	3:59

== Charts ==
=== Weekly charts ===
==== "Non c'è" ====
Chart (1994)	Peak position
Germany (GfK)	76

==== "Se fue" ====
Chart (1994–2020)	Peak position
El Salvador (UPI)	1
Mexico (AMPROFON)	1
Nicaragua Pop (Monitor Latino)	7
Panama (UPI)	1
Peru (UPI)	2
US Hot Latin Songs (Billboard)	24
US Latin Pop Airplay (Billboard)	5
US Tropical Songs (Billboard)	8
Venezuela (UPI)	2

==== "Se fué" (featuring Marc Anthony) ====
Chart (2014)	Peak position
Mexico (Billboard Espanol Airplay)	44
US Hot Latin Songs (Billboard)	25
US Latin Airplay (Billboard)	15
US Latin Pop Songs (Billboard)	6
US Latin Tropical (Billboard)	13

== Certifications ==
Certifications for "Se fue" by Laura Pausini
Region	Certification	Certified units/sales
Spain (Promusicae)	Gold	30,000^{‡}
^{‡} Sales+streaming figures based on certification alone.

== Covers ==
The song was covered by Brazilian brother-sister singing duo Sandy & Junior, a Portuguese-language version, "Não Ter". Milly Quezada performed a cover with her band Milly y Los Vecinos. This version peaked at #10 on the Billboard Tropical Songs.

=== Vesna Pisarović cover ===
In 2000, Croatian singer Vesna Pisarović also covered the song under the title "Da znaš" ("If only you knew"). It served as the opening song of her eponymous debut studio album. Her version contained lyrics written by Milana Vlaović and an arrangement finalized by Bruno Kovačić.

To promote the song, she filmed an accompanying music video and performed it live during her concerts and televised appearances. On 8 March 2022, Pisarović appeared together with Danijela Martinović and performed the song at the latter's Open Heart Lisinski concert in Zagreb at the Vatroslav Lisinski Concert Hall. Pisarović performed an acoustic version of "Da znaš" for bravo! LIVE on 21 March 2025. Pisarović performed the song live at the 29th edition of the Golden Ladybug of Popularity event in Skopje, North Macedonia on 26 February 2026.

Jelena Rozga also covered the song during her live concert on 17 May 2020 on Instagram given in the midst of the COVID-19 pandemic.

=== Rauw Alejandro cover ===
"Se fue"

Single by Rauw Alejandro and Laura Pausini

from the album Cosa Nuestra
- Language: Spanish
- Released: 20 December 2024
- Length: 4:00
- Label: Sony Latin; Duars
- Songwriters: Ignacio Ballesteros Díaz; Federico Cavalli; Pietro Cremonesi; Arcangelo Valsiglio
- Producer: Mr. NaisGai

Rauw Alejandro singles chronology
"Khé?" (2024)	"Se fue" (2024)	"Ni Me Conozco" (2025)

Laura Pausini singles chronology
"Zeri in più (Locura)" (2024)	"Se fue" (2024)

After performing a cover at the 24th Annual Latin Grammy Awards, Puerto Rican singer Rauw Alejandro teamed up with Pausini to record the song for his fifth studio album, Cosa Nuestra (2024). During the album's first week, "Se fue" collected 5.8 million streams in the United States and peaked at number 82 on the Billboard Hot 100, marking Pausini's first appearance on the list, 30 years after she debuted on a Billboard chart. The track was released as a single in Italy on 20 December 2024. Pausini and Alejandro performed "Se fue" as a live duet for the first time on 29 June 2025, during the Italian concert of the Cosa Nuestra World Tour at the Unipol Forum in Assago, Milan.

==== Charts ====
Chart performance for "Se fue"
Chart (2024)	Peak position
Bolivia (Billboard)	14
Ecuador (Billboard)	12
Global 200 (Billboard)	57
Mexico (Billboard)	19
Peru (Billboard)	15
Spain (Promusicae)	5
US Billboard Hot 100	82
US Hot Latin Songs (Billboard)	7
US Hot Latin Pop Songs (Billboard)	19

==== Certifications ====
Certifications for "Se fue" by Rauw Alejandro & Laura Pausini
Region	Certification	Certified units/sales
Mexico (AMPROFON)	Platinum	140,000^{‡}
Spain (Promusicae)	Gold	30,000^{‡}
Streaming
Central America (CFC)	Gold	3,500,000^{†}
^{‡} Sales+streaming figures based on certification alone.^{†} Streaming-only figures based on certification alone.
