= Laura Pausini (1995 album) =

Compilation album by Laura Pausini
- Released: May 11, 1995
- Genre: Pop
- Length: 47:00
- Languages: Italian, English
- Label: CGD
- Producers: Angelo Valsiglio, Marco Marati

Laura Pausini chronology
| Laura Pausini (1994) | Laura Pausini (1995) | Le cose che vivi/Las cosas que vives (1996) |

Singles from Laura Pausini
- 1. "Loneliness" Released: 1995

Professional ratings
Review scores
| Source | Rating |
|---|---|
| AllMusic | 4/5 stars |

Laura Pausini is a compilation album of Italian singer Laura Pausini's greatest hits and other selected tracks. It was released on May 11, 1995 by CGD (Warner) Records for the anglophone market. Although it is a compilation album, the track listing is very similar to her previous 1994 album of the same name, despite this album being primarily Italian.

The album includes a little-known English version of Pausini's trademark song, La solitudine (in English, it was renamed "The Loneliness").

== Track listing ==
| No. | Title | Lyrics | Music | Length |
|---|---|---|---|---|
| 1. | "La solitudine (Loneliness)" | Federico Cavalli, Cremonesi, Tim Rice | Angelo Valsiglio, Pietro Cremonesi | 4:00 |
| 2. | "Gente" | Cheope, Marco Marati | Valsiglio | 4:30 |
| 3. | "Lui non sta con te" | Cheope, Marati | Valsiglio, Roberto Buti | 3:45 |
| 4. | "Strani amori" | Cheope, Marati, Francesco Tanini | Valsiglio, Buti | 4:10 |
| 5. | "Ragazze che" | Cheope, Marati | Valsiglio, Buti | 4:30 |
| 6. | "Il coraggio che non-c’è"" | Cheope, Marati | Valsiglio | 4:35 |
| 7. | "Perché non-torna più" | Cavalli | Valsiglio, Cremonesi | 4:10 |
| 8. | "Non c’è" | Cavalli | Valsiglio, Cremonesi | 4:40 |
| 9. | "Tutt’al più" | Cavalli, Roberto Casini | Valsiglio, Cremonesi | 4:02 |
| 10. | "Lettera" | Cheope, Marati | Valsiglio, Giovanni Salvatori | 3:42 |
| Total length: | | | | 43:03 |

Japanese edition bonus track
| No. | Title | Lyrics | Music | Length |
|---|---|---|---|---|
| 11. | "La solitudine" | Cavalli, Cremonesi, Valsiglio | Valsiglio, Cremonesi | 4:00 |
| Total length: | | | | 47:03 |

== Notes ==
- "Song Search". Warner Chappell Music (Italy). Accessed 24 August 2007.
