= Abraham Mateo =

Spanish singer (born 1998)

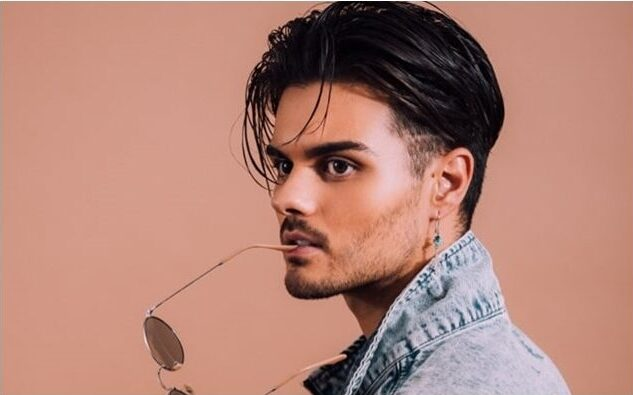
- Mateo in 2024

Background information
- Born: Abraham Mateo Chamorro; 25 August 1998 (age 28); San Fernando, Cádiz, Spain
- Genres: Latin pop; R&B; reggaeton; Latin ballad; Latin dance
- Occupations: Singer; songwriter; actor; record producer
- Instruments: Vocals; piano; guitar; flute
- Years active: 2009–present
- Labels: Sony Spain (2012–present); EMI Spain (2009–2012)
- Website: AbrahamMateoOfficial.com

Abraham Mateo Chamorro (born 25 August 1998) is a Spanish singer, songwriter, record producer, and actor.

He began his career as a child prodigy, capturing national attention in Spain for his remarkable vocal talent and releasing his debut album at just ten years old. Mateo rose to international prominence at age fourteen with the breakout hit "Señorita", which established him as a rising star in Latin pop.

Over the course of his career, he has released seven studio albums and earned multi-platinum certifications across several countries. Renowned for his dynamic fusion of Latin pop, urban, R&B, and dance music, he has collaborated with high-profile artists such as Jennifer Lopez, Farruko, Becky G, Manuel Turizo, and 50 Cent. Among his most popular songs are "Loco Enamorado", "Háblame Bajito", "Se Acabó El Amor", "Quiero Decirte", "Clavaíto", and "¿Qué Ha Pasao?".

Notably, Mateo is the youngest solo male artist to reach number one on the Billboard Latin Airplay chart. In addition to his success as a performer, he has built a respected career as a music producer and has toured extensively throughout Spain and Latin America.

== Early life ==
Abraham Mateo was born on 25 August 1998 in San Fernando, Cádiz. He grew up in a musical family: his maternal grandfather was a church choir tenor, his paternal grandfather a flamenco singer, and his mother sang traditional Spanish music. His older brother Tony is also a singer and a member of the pop duo Lerica. Abraham began singing at age three, imitating Operación Triunfo performances, with early vocal guidance from his mother. He later studied singing and music theory and learned to play several instruments by ear.

At seven, he took part in the children's music festival Veo Veo, organized by the Teresa Rabal Foundation, and won the National Revelation Award two years later. At nine, he made his television debut on the Andalusian program Menuda Noche on Canal Sur, where he performed for over four years. During that time, he sang well-known Spanish songs, performed with Raphael, and appeared before guest artists such as Juan Luis Guerra and David Bisbal.

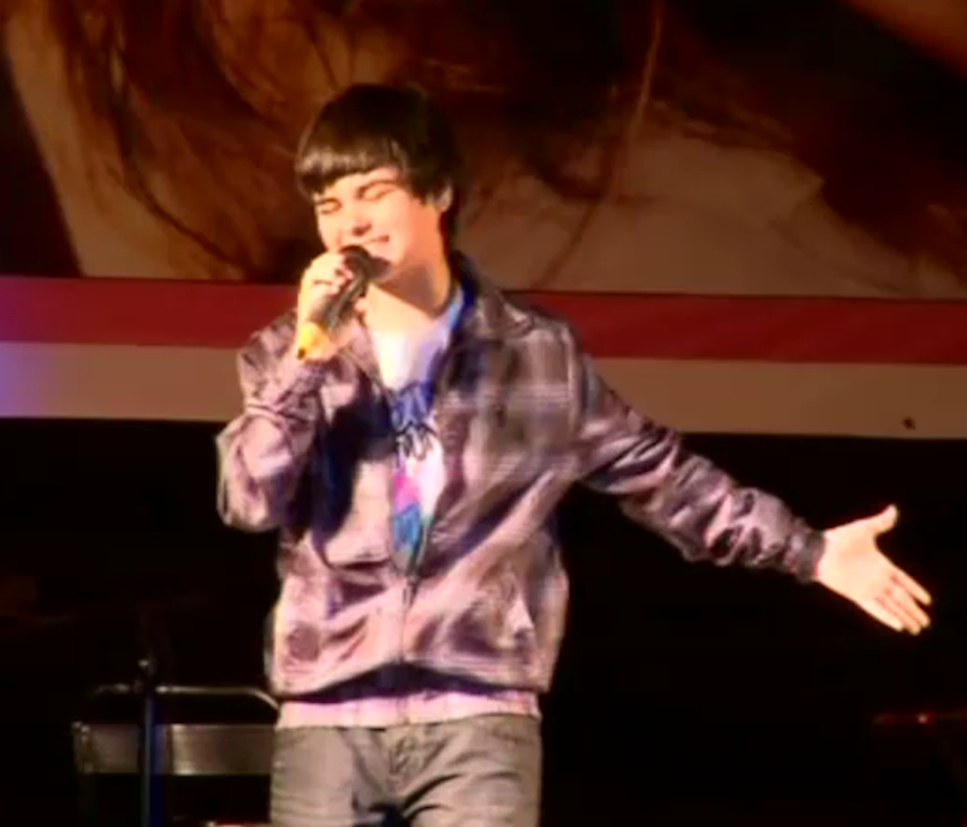
Mateo performing in 2010 at a charity event in his native San Fernando

In 2009, at age ten, he signed with EMI Music Spain and released his self-titled debut album, Abraham Mateo. The album featured original ballads by Jacobo Calderon, Spanish-language covers of songs by Luis Fonsi, Alejandro Sanz, and Laura Pausini, and a duet with French singer Caroline Costa. Around the same time, he began uploading home covers to YouTube, including "Adagio", "I surrender", "El jardin prohibido", and a collaboration with the then-unknown Sabrina Carpenter, several of which became viral. In 2011 he released his original Latin dance single "Desde que te fuiste" on iTunes.

== Music career ==
=== 2012–2016: Teen idol ===
In 2012, Mateo signed with Sony Music Spain and began working with producer Jacobo Calderón and manager Rosa Lagarrigue. His second album, AM (2013), blended youthful, danceable pop with electropop and R&B influences, including both Spanish and English lyrics, and debuted in the top 10 in Spain. It was certified Gold and featured the breakout single "Señorita" which became a hit across Europe and Latin America, spending over 40 weeks on the Spanish charts and becoming YouTube Spain's most-watched video of 2013. Mateo was later nominated as Best New Artist at Premios Juventud and appeared on Billboard's Next Big Sound chart.

In 2014, he launched a national tour with over 40 concerts in Spain and opened for One Direction during their Where We Are Tour in Spain and Latin America. He also performed for the first time in Latin America, including shows in Chile and at Luna Park in Buenos Aires. That November, his first biography, I.AM., was published by Montena (Penguin Random House).

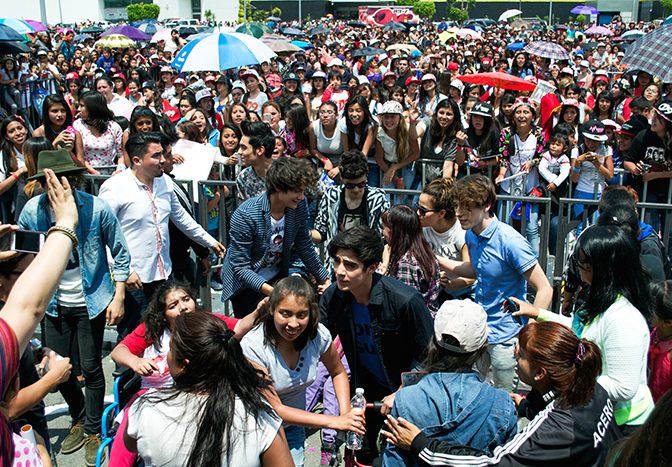
Mateo and the Mexican boyband CD9 at an autograph-signing event in Ecatepec, Mexico, April 2015

His third album, Who I AM, fused pop, ballads, and R&B with funk influences. It debuted at number five in Spain (Platinum) and reached number one in Mexico. The single "All the Girls (La La La)" became a hit in Spain and Brazil, with its video named Best Music Video by VEVO Spain. Mateo toured extensively across Latin America, performing at major venues such as Luna Park and Arena Ciudad de México.

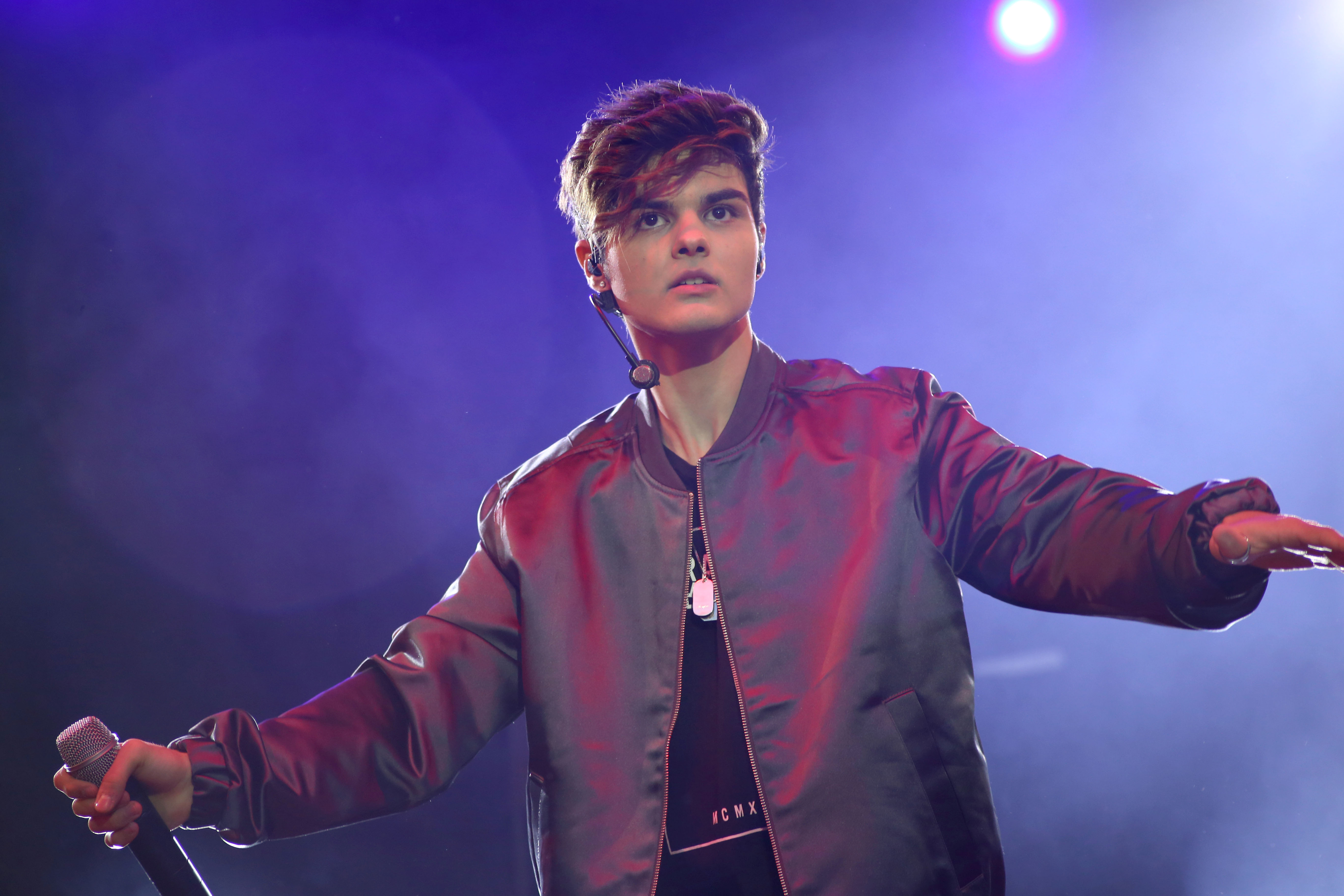
Mateo performing in Valladolid during his Are You Ready? Tour in May 2016

In 2015, he recorded his fourth album, Are You Ready?, in London and Los Angeles with producers like Poo Bear and Jörgen Elofsson. Released in November, the album introduced a more mature sound, mixing pop, R&B, and bilingual ballads. It debuted at number three in Spain (Gold) and number seven in Mexico. Singles included "Old School," "When You Love Somebody," and "Mueve" featuring Lali.

In 2016, Mateo toured Latin America and Europe, with shows in Colombia, Chile, Argentina, Peru, Portugal, and Mexico—performing at venues like Mexico City's National Auditorium and Buenos Aires' Gran Rex. He also collaborated with CNCO and Río Roma, joined Morat on stage in Madrid, and received three nominations at Premios Juventud.

=== 2017–2021: Transition to urban music and positioning in Latin America ===
In 2017, Mateo embarked on a new phase in his career, adopting a more urban and Latin sound while maintaining elements of his Spanish roots. He began working with managers Armando Lozano and Edgar Andino to support his internationalization efforts. That same year, he released "Loco Enamorado" featuring Puerto Rican artists Farruko and Christian Daniel. The track became a breakout hit across Latin America and the U.S., reaching No. 6 on Billboard's Latin Pop Songs and charting on Hot Latin Songs, Latin Airplay, Latin Rhythm Airplay, and Mexico Airplay. It was certified 4× Platinum (US Latin), 3× Platinum in Mexico, 2× Platinum in Spain, and Platinum or Gold in several other countries including Argentina, Chile, Colombia, and Peru.

Later in 2017, Mateo released "Háblame Bajito", featuring rap icon 50 Cent and pop singer Austin Mahone. The video premiered exclusively on Billboard, and the single was certified Platinum in US Latin and Mexico, and Gold in Spain and Argentina. In early 2018, he received a nomination for Best New Latin Artist at the iHeartRadio Music Awards, reflecting his growing impact in the Latin music world. Later that year, he scored his first Billboard Latin Airplay number one with "Se Acabó El Amor", alongside Jennifer Lopez and Yandel, becoming the youngest male artist to top that chart. The single went Platinum in the U.S. cementing his position within the Latin urban genre. He also collaborated on "Jungle" with Pitbull, "30 de Febrero" with Ha*Ash, the remix of "Quiéreme" with Farruko, Jacob Forever, and Lary Over, and "Loco por ti" with the Argentine duo MYA and Colombian singer Feid.

During his XIII Tour promoting the album A Cámara Lenta, Mateo performed in Spain, Argentina (including Luna Park and Teatro Gran Rex), Uruguay, and Peru, and held showcases in Guatemala, Costa Rica, Panama, and the Dominican Republic. In Mexico, he toured with Mau y Ricky, performing at venues such as the Pepsi Center, Auditorio Telmex, and Auditorio Metropolitano. He also performed at the Festival Presidente in the Dominican Republic and held a concert in Miami during Formula 1 events.

In 2019, Mateo released "Me Vuelvo Loco" with CNCO and "¿Qué Ha Pasao?" with Sofía Reyes as previews of his sixth studio album, Sigo a lo Mío, released in 2020. The album features collaborations with Manuel Turizo and Becky G, and includes the track "Esta Cuarentena", written during the COVID-19 pandemic. The title track addresses the online harassment Mateo experienced during his adolescence. He released "Qué Será" with Leslie Grace, collaborated with Omar Montes and Lérica on "Pegamos Tela," which became a hit in Spain, participated in the charity single "Pa' La Cultura," led by David Guetta, and also released the afro-pop track "Sanga Zoo" with Farruko and Nigerian artist Davido.

=== 2022–present: Return to pop and consolidation in Spain ===
Following the COVID-19 pandemic, Abraham Mateo refocused his career on the Spanish market with the goal of consolidating his position as an adult pop artist. During this period, he embraced a sound rooted in modern pop with electronic elements and influences from the 1980s and 1990s.

In 2022, he released Quiero decirte with Ana Mena, which was certified four times platinum in Spain. The song appears on the soundtrack of the Amazon Prime Video film Culpa nuestra (Our fault, 2025), in which Mateo makes a cameo performing the track. In 2023, he achieved widespread success with "Clavaíto", a bachata-infused collaboration with Chanel. The track reached six-times platinum status and won Best Collaboration at the LOS40 Music Awards.

In April 2024, Mateo released Insomnio, a studio album that blends Latin pop, electronic sounds, and urban rhythms. The record features collaborations with Sebastián Yatra ("XQ Sigues Pensando :("), Danny Ocean ("Bailarina"), Omar Montes ("Falsos Recuerdos"), and includes the viral hit "Maníaca", a Spanish adaptation of Michael Sembello's Maniac, as well as "La Idea". The album was awarded Best Album at the LOS40 Music Awards and received additional nominations for Best Artist and Best Song. It was also nominated for Best Pop Album by the Spanish Academy of Music.

To promote the album, Mateo performed in major cities across Spain and Latin America, including sold-out shows at Teatro Metropólitan in Mexico City and Teatro Ópera in Buenos Aires. He appeared at the Starlite Festival in Marbella and performed a tango-inspired version of "Clavaíto" at the final of Benidorm Fest 2024. Later that year, he performed "Maníaca" during the interval of the Junior Eurovision Song Contest. The song was certified double platinum in Spain following its commercial success. That same year, he was invited by Atlético Madrid to perform during halftime at the derby against Real Madrid in a duet with Mexican singer Danna Paola; however, the performance was ultimately cancelled following remarks she made on television.

He also released several reinterpretations of classic Spanish-language hits, such as "Hoy tengo ganas de ti" by Miguel Gallardo, "Ahora te puedes marchar" popularized by Luis Miguel, and a new version of "Son de amores" with Andy & Lucas. Additional collaborations during this period included tracks with Luis Fonsi ("Bora Bora"), Belinda, Danna Paola, L-Gante ("Vamos que nos vamos"), and Miranda! ("Por ese hombre").

In 2023, he released Acoustic Home Session, a live acoustic collection of his most representative songs. Mateo also expanded his television presence, serving as an adviser on La Voz España (2023), judge on Factor X (2024)—where his act Aye Alfonso won the competition— and winner of Mask Singer: Adivina quién canta (2024). He was one of the presenters of RTVE 's musical talent show Cover Night. In 2025, he was appointed as a judge on the Spanish reality television music competition Operación Triunfo. He also performed at the 15th anniversary gala of the Spanish production of The Lion King at Madrid's Teatro Lope de Vega, giving a special performance of "Él vive en ti" (He Lives in You). In January 2026, he will celebrate 20 years of his music career with a concert titled "20 Años Después" at Madrid's Movistar Arena, marking the anniversary of his first live performance as a child.

== Music production ==
From the beginning of his solo career, Mateo has been deeply involved in the creative process, developing skills in production, vocal recording, and digital programming with the guidance of Dani Ruiz. In 2017, he set up a professional home studio in Madrid, The Spaceship, designed by acoustic engineer Jan Morel.

He first produced tracks on his 2018 album A cámara lenta, including the title track, "Háblame bajito" (with 50 Cent and Austin Mahone), and "Se acabó el amor" (with Yandel and Jennifer López). His next albums, Sigo a lo mío (2020) and Insomnio (2024), were mostly self-produced or co-produced, featuring collaborations with Becky G, Sofía Reyes, Manuel Turizo, Danny Ocean, and Sebastián Yatra, and hits such as "Bailarina" (with Danny Ocean), "Clavaíto", "Maníaca", and "Quiero decirte" blending Latin, urban, and electronic styles.

Mateo has also been the main producer for the Spanish group Lérica (Cocoterapia, 2022), and has worked with artists including Belinda, Danna Paola, Malú, Juan Magán, Lali, Cali & El Dandee, Mau y Ricky, Beret, Gente de Zona, Omar Montes, and Drake Bell. He has collaborated with producers such as Tainy, Jota Rosa, Rayito, Andrés Torres, Mauricio Rengifo, Julio Reyes Copello, and Garabatto.

Known for blending diverse genres while maintaining his artistic identity, Mateo integrates reggaeton, bachata, and other urban influences into contemporary pop. His work combines live instruments, like piano and guitar, with digital programming, and he often travels with a portable studio to record ideas and vocals on the go.

== Artistry and public image ==
Abraham Mateo completed his secondary and high school education through distance learning, partly due to the public exposure of his early career and experiences of bullying in his hometown, San Fernando. As a teenager, he became a prominent teen pop figure in Spain and Latin America, with a devoted fan base known as "Abrahamers." His early rise drew comparisons to Justin Bieber, and Billboard described him as a "wunderkind" who "sounds and dances a lot like Michael Jackson."

Despite his popularity, Mateo faced criticism and online bullying from influencers and YouTubers who mocked his public image. In Spain, he was often perceived as a child-focused artist, which affected his credibility and led him to focus more on his international career, particularly in Latin America and the U.S.

In 2015, he was pranked on a TV charity special into believing Michael Jackson wanted to record a duet with him. Though meant as a joke, the segment drew widespread attention and reinforced public mockery.

Musically, Mateo combines Latin pop with elements of R&B, electropop, and reggaetón. He cites Michael Jackson, Bruno Mars, Chris Brown, Luis Miguel and Alejandro Sanz as key influences.

In July 2023, he participated in La Velada del Año 3, a boxing event organized by streamer Ibai Llanos, where he won the opening match against Spanish YouTuber Ampeter by split decision.

== Discography ==
=== Studio albums ===
Title	Album details	Peak chart positions		Certifications
Title	Album details	SPA	MEX	Certifications
Abraham Mateo	Released: 4 December 2009; Label: EMI Music Spain; Format: CD, digital download	—	—	
AM	Released: 12 November 2013; Label: Sony Music Spain; Format: CD, digital download	6	—	PROMUSICAE: Gold
Who I AM	Released: 3 November 2014; Label: Sony Music Spain; Format: CD, digital download	1	1	PROMUSICAE: Platinum
Are You Ready?	Release: 13 November 2015; Label: Sony Music Spain; Format: CD, digital download	3	7	PROMUSICAE: Gold
A Cámara Lenta	Release: 30 November 2018; Label: Sony Music Spain; Format: CD, digital download	7	—	
Sigo a Lo Mío	Release: 19 June 2020; Label: Sony Music Spain; Format: CD, digital download	—	—	
Insomnio	Release: 4 April 2024; Label: Sony Music Spain; Format: CD, digital download	13	—	
"—" denotes releases that did not chart or were not released in that territory.

=== Singles ===
List of singles, with selected chart positions, showing year released and album name
Title	Year	Peak chart positions										Certifications	Album
Title	Year	SPA	ARG	COL	ECU	MEX	SWI	URU	US Latin	US Latin Pop	VEN	Certifications	Album
"Vuelve conmigo"	2009	—	—	—	—	—	—	—	—	—	—		Abraham Mateo
"Señorita"	2012	3	—	—	—	—	—	—	—	—	—		AM
"Girlfriend"	2013	15	—	—	—	—	—	—	—	—	—		AM
"Lánzalo"	2014	2	—	—	—	—	—	—	—	—	—		AM
"All the Girls (La La La)"	2014	9	—	—	—	—	—	—	—	—	—		Who I AM
"Todo Terminó"	2015	—	—	—	—	—	—	—	—	—	—		Who I AM
"Old School"	2015	—	—	—	—	—	—	—	—	—	—		Are You Ready?
"Are You Ready"	2016	—	—	—	—	—	—	—	—	—	—		Are You Ready?
"When You Love Somebody"	2016	—	—	—	—	—	—	—	—	—	—		Are You Ready?
"Mueve" (featuring Lali)	2016	—	—	—	—	—	—	—	—	—	—		Are You Ready?
"Mi Vecina"	2016	—	—	—	—	—	—	—	—	—	—		Are You Ready?
"Loco Enamorado" (with Farruko and Christian Daniel)	2017	13	14	19	8	22	—	3	22	6	40	PROMUSICAE: 2× Platinum; AMPROFON: 2× Platinum; ASINCOL: Gold; CAPIF: Platinum; IFPI CHI: Platinum; RIAA: 4× Platinum (Latin)	A Cámara Lenta
"Háblame Bajito" (with 50 Cent and Austin Mahone)	2017	57	—	—	73	—	—	—	— (Note: "Háblame Bajito" did not chart on the Billboard Hot Latin Songs, though did peak at number 17 on the Latin Digital Song Sales chart.)	—	42	RIAA: Platinum (Latin); AMPROFON: Gold	A Cámara Lenta
"Mentirosa Compulsiva" (with Lérica)	2018	—	—	—	—	—	—	—	—	—	—		A Cámara Lenta
"Se Acabó El Amor" (with Yandel and Jennifer Lopez)	2018	64	93	—	73	—	83	—	19	5	29	RIAA: Platinum (Latin)	A Cámara Lenta
"Bailotéame" (with Agustín Casanova and Mau y Ricky)	2018	—	—	—	—	—	—	8	—	—	—		Non-album single
"Loco por Ti" (with MYA and Feid)	2018	—	77	—	—	—	—	—	—	—	—		Hoy
"A Cámara Lenta"	2018	—	—	—	—	—	—	—	—	—	—	RIAA: Gold (Latin)	A Cámara Lenta
"Bom Bom" (with Yenddi featuring De La Ghetto and Jon Z)	2018	—	—	—	—	—	—	—	—	27	—		A Cámara Lenta
"Mejor Que Él"	2018	—	—	—	—	—	—	—	—	—	—		A Cámara Lenta
"Me Vuelvo Loco" (with CNCO)	2019	—	61	—	—	—	—	—	— (Note: "Me Vuelvo Loco" did not chart on the Billboard Hot Latin Songs, though did peak at number 16 on the Latin Digital Song Sales chart.)	—	—	RIAA: Gold (Latin)	Sigo a Lo Mío
"¿Qué Ha Pasao'?" (with Sofía Reyes)	2019	—	48	—	19	27	—	—	—	—	—	PROMUSICAE: Platinum	Sigo a Lo Mío
"Qué Será" (with Leslie Grace)	2019	—	—	—	—	—	—	—	—	—	—		Non-album singles
"Pegamos Tela" (with Lérica and Omar Montes)	2020	17	—	—	—	—	—	—	—	—	—		Non-album singles
"No encuentro palabras" (with Manuel Turizo)	2020												Sigo a Lo Mío
"Esta cuarentena"	2020												Sigo a Lo Mío
"Sigo a Lo Mío"	2020												Sigo a Lo Mío
"Tiempo Pa Olvidar" (with Becky G)	2020	—	—	—	—	28	—	—	—	11	—		Sigo a Lo Mío
"Aunque Estés Con Él"	2020												Non-album single
"Só Sei Dizer" (with Cabrera and Mc Don Juan)	2021												Cabrera Conexión – EP1
"Sanga Zoo" (with Obrinn and Davido featuring Farruko)	2021												Non-album singles
"Aunque lloraré" (with Danny Romero)	2021												Non-album singles
"Repetíamos"	2021												Non-album singles
"Vamos que nos vamos" (with L-Gante and Omar Montes)	2022												Non-album singles
"Quiero Decirte" (with Ana Mena)	2022	10	—	—	—	—	—	—	—	—	—	PROMUSICAE: 4× Platinum	Insomnio
"Ahora te puedes marchar"	2022												Non-album singles
"Me Encantaría" (with Belinda)	2022												Non-album singles
"La Idea"	2023												Insomnio
"Te Miro A La Cara" (with Daviles De Novelda)	2023	27	—	—	—	—	—	—	—	—	—	PROMUSICAE: Gold	Non-album singles
"Bora Bora" (with Luis Fonsi)	2023												Non-album singles
"Clavaíto" (with Chanel)	2023	6	—	—	—	—	—	—	—	—	—	PROMUSICAE: 5× Platinum	Agua! and Insomnio
"Maníaca"	2023	71	—	—	—	—	—	—	—	—	—	PROMUSICAE: 2× Platinum	Insomnio
"Solo x ti (Remix)" (with Pol Granch)	2023												Non-album single
"XQ Sigues Pasando :(" (with Sebastián Yatra)	2023	68	—	—	—	—	—	—	—	—	—		Insomnia
"Tequiero" (with Vicco)	2023	87	—	—	—	—	—	—	—	—	—		Noctalgia
"Toxic Christmas"	2023												Non-album single
"Falsos Recuerdo" (with Omar Montes)	2024	22	—	—	—	—	—	—	—	—	—		Insomnio
"Bailarina" (with Danny Ocean)	2024												Insomnio
"Tienes que saber" (with Naiara)	2024												Non-album singles
"Hoy tengo ganas de ti"	2024												Non-album singles
"El Doble" (with Danna)	2024												Non-album singles
"Caigo (Stumblin' In)" (with Cyril and Essa Gante)	2024												Non-album singles
"Golfo X Despecho" (with Lérica and Clara)	2024												Otra Vibra
"Solonely"	2024												Non-album single
"Por ese hombre" (with Miranda!)	2025												Nuevo Hotel Miranda!
"Rayo de luz" (with Soge Culebra)	2025												TBA
"—" denotes a title that was not released or did not chart in that territory

=== Featured singles ===
Title	Year	Album
"Por Que Esperar?" (Angy featuring Abraham Mateo)	2013	Non-album single
"Sin usar palabras" (Lodovica Comello featuring Abraham Mateo)	2015	Mariposa
"Para Siempre (All the Way)" (CD9 featuring Abraham Mateo)	2015	CD9 (Love & Live Edition)
"Quisiera (Ballad version)" (CNCO featuring Abraham Mateo)	2016	Primera Cita
"Barco de Papel" (Río Roma featuring Abraham Mateo)	2017	Eres la Persona Correcta en el Momento Equivocado
"Jungle" (Pitbull and The Stereotypes featuring E-40 and Abraham Mateo)	2017	Greatest Hits
"Quiéreme (Remix)" (Farruko and Jacob Forever featuring Abraham Mateo and Lary Over)	2018	Non-album single
"De Verdad" (Adexe & Nau featuring Abraham Mateo)	2019	Indiscutibles
"Lucid" (4B featuring Austin Mahone and Abraham Mateo)	2020	Non-album single
"En el descuento" (Pinto "Wahin" featuring Abraham Mateo)	2020	Del 1 al 13
"Pa' la Cultura" (with David Guetta and Human(X) featuring Sofía Reyes, Abraham Mateo, De La Ghetto, Zion & Lennox, Manuel Turizo, Thalía and Mejor)	2020	Non-album singles
"25 Noches" (MYA featuring Abraham Mateo)	2020	Non-album singles

=== Guest appearances ===
List of other appearances, showing year released and album name
Title	Year	Other artist(s)	Album
"30 de Febrero"	2017	Ha*Ash	30 de Febrero
"Salvaje"	2018	Lali	Brava
"Que Salga El Sol For Donde Quiera"	2019	El Arrebato	Abrazos
"Bandida"	2019	Menor Menor	Trinity La Marca
"A Prueba de Ti"	2023	Malú	A Todo Sí

== Music videos ==
=== As lead artist ===
Title	Year	Director
"Vuelve Conmigo"	2009	EMI Music Spain
"Señorita"	2013	Jota Aronak
"Girlfriend"	2013	Jota Aronak
"Girlfriend" (acoustic version)	2013	Juan Carlos Somoza
"Lánzalo"	2014	Juan Carlos Somoza
"All The Girls (La La La)"	2014	Alberto Evangelio
"Todo Terminó"	2015	Alberto Evangelio
"Mellow Yellow"	2015	Willy Rodriguez
"Old School"	2015	Willy Rodríguez
"Are You Ready"	2016	Willy Rodríguez
"Así Es Tu Amor"	2016	Willy Rodríguez
"When You Love Somebody"	2016	Mauri D. Galiano
"Mueve" ft Lali	2016	Hermanos Dawidson
"Mi Vecina"	2016	Mauri D. Galiano
"Loco Enamorado" with Farruko, Christian Daniel	2017	Mike Ho
"Háblame Bajito" with 50 Cent, Austin Mahone	2017	Mike Ho
"Mentirosa Compulsiva" with Lerica	2018	Mauri D Galliamo
"Se Acabó el Amor" with Yandel, Jennifer Lopez	2018	Daniel Durán
"Loco por Ti" with MYA, Feid	2018	Sony Music Argentina
"A Cámara Lenta"	2018	Daniel Durán
"Bom Bom" with Yenddi ft De La Ghetto, Jon Z	2018	Mike Ho
"Me Vuelvo Loco" with CNCO	2019	Mike Ho

=== As featured artist ===
Title	Year	Director
"Sin Usar Palabras" (Lodovica Comello featuring Abraham Mateo)	2015	Tomas Goldschmidt
"Para Siempre (All the Way" (CD9 featuring Abraham Mateo)	2015	Sony Music Mexico
"Quisiera (Ballad version)" (CNCO featuring Abraham Mateo)	2016	Ruslan Shakirov
"Barco de Papel (In-House Sessions)" (Rio Roma featuring Abraham Mateo)	2017	Andrés "Chano" Guardado, Gonzalo Ferrari
"Jungle" (Pitbull & The Stereotypes featuring E-40 & Abraham Mateo)	2017	RCA Records
"30 de Febrero" (Ha*Ash featuring Abraham Mateo)	2017	Sony Music Entertainment México
"Quiereme (remix)" (Farruko & Jacob Forever featuring Abraham Mateo & Lary Over)	2018	Sony Music Entertainment US Latin LLC
"De Verdad" (Adexe & Nau featuring Abraham Mateo)	2019	Sony Music Entertainment US Latin LLC

== Concert tours ==
Headlining

- AM Tour (2014) – Spain, Chile, and Argentina
- Who I AM Tour (2014–2015) – Spain, Mexico, Argentina, and Peru
- Are You Ready? Tour (2016–2017) – Spain, Mexico, Argentina, Chile, and Ecuador
- XIII Tour (2018) – Spain, Uruguay, and Argentina
- Joint tour with Mau y Ricky (2019) – Mexico
- Insomnio Tour (2023–2024) – Spain, Mexico, and Argentina
- PDH Tour (2025) – Spain

Opening act

- Where We Are Tour (for One Direction) (2014) – Peru, Chile, and Spain

== Production discography ==
Title	Year	Artist(s)	Album	Credits
"Mi Vecina"	2016	Abraham Mateo	Are You Ready? (Special Edition)	Recording Engineer, composer, lyricist
"Temblando en la Oscuridad"	2016	Abraham Mateo	Are You Ready? (Special Edition)	Recording Engineer, composer, lyricist
"Salvaje"	2018	Lali, Abraham Mateo	Brava	Producer, composer, lyricist
"A Camara Lenta"	2018	Abraham Mateo	A Cámara Lenta	Co-Producer, producer, composer, lyricist
"Se Acabó El Amor"	2018	Abraham Mateo, Yandel, Jennifer Lopez	A Cámara Lenta	Producer, composer
"Hablame Bajito"	2018	Abraham Mateo, 50 Cent, Austin Mahone	A Cámara Lenta	Producer, composer
"La Noche"	2018	Abraham Mateo	A Cámara Lenta	Producer, lyricist
"Karma"	2018	Abraham Mateo	A Cámara Lenta	Producer, lyricist
"Mi Española"	2018	Abraham Mateo	A Cámara Lenta	Producer, lyricist
"La Boca Agua"	2018	Abraham Mateo	A Cámara Lenta	Producer, lyricist
"Major Que Él"	2018	Abraham Mateo	A Cámara Lenta	Producer, composer, lyricist
"Also De Ti"	2018	Abraham Mateo	A Cámara Lenta	Producer, lyricist
"En Tu Colchón o el Mio"	2018	Abraham Mateo, Farina	A Cámara Lenta	Producer, lyricist
"Un Traguito"	2019	Lerica, Belinda	De Cero	Producer, composer, lyricist
"Solterita de Oro"	2019	Lerica, Gente de Zona, Leslie Shaw	De Cero	Producer, composer, lyricist
"Solito, Solo"	2019	Lerica, Danny Romero, Agustin Casanova	De Cero	Producer, composer, lyricist
"Algo Más"	2019	Lerica	De Cero	Producer, composer, lyricist
"De Verdad"	2019	Adexe & Nau, Abraham Mateo		Producer, composer, lyricist
"Fuera de mi Mente"	2019	Lérica, Juan Magan		Producer, composer, lyricist
"Me Vuelvo Loco"	2019	Abraham Mateo, CNCO		Producer, Recording Engineer, composer, lyricist
"Que ha pasao?"	2019	Abraham Mateo, Sofia Reyes		Producer, Recording Engineer, composer, lyricist
"Qué sera?"	2019	Leslie Grace, Abraham Mateo		Recording Engineer, composer, lyricist
"Que Salga El Sol For Donde Quiera"	2019	Arrebato, Abraham Mateo	Abrazos	Producer, Recording Arranger, Programmer
"Contigo"	2019	Diana Ela, Abraham Mateo, Katalina, Leslie Shaw		Producer, composer, lyricist
"Du bist mein Highlight (No Puedo Estar Sin Ti)"	2020	Vanessa Mai feat. Lerica		Composer, lyricist

== Filmography ==
=== Television ===
Year	Title	Role	Notes	Ref
2007–2011	Menuda Noche	Singer / Performer	Spanish TV program, Canal Sur, Spain	
2009	Días sin luz	Mari Luz's younger brother	Miniseries aired on Antena 3, Spain	
2010	Raphael: una historia de superación personal	Young Raphael	Miniseries aired on Antena 3, Spain	
2013	XQEsperar	Himself	Online miniseries	
2014	Dreamland	Himself (cameo)	Spanish TV series	
2014	B&b, de boca en boca	Himself (cameo)	TV series (Telecinco, Spain)	
2015	José Mota Presenta	Guest Performer (cameo)	Spanish comedy/variety show	
2023	Acoustic Home	Featured Artist / Performer	HBO Max series, episode filmed in Canary Islands, Spain	
2023	La Voz	Advisor / Coach	Antena 3, Spain	
2023	Cover Night	Performer / Guest	Spanish TV music program	
2024	Mask Singer: Adivina quién canta	Mosca	Antena 3, Spain (Season 4 winner)	
2024	Factor X	Judge and Mentor	Antena 3, Spain	
2025	Operación Triunfo	Judge	Spanish TV music program	

=== Film ===
Year	Title	Role	Notes	Ref
2018	The Week Of	Soundtrack Performer	Featured the song "Jungle" with Pitbull; film stars Chris Rock, Adam Sandler	
2025	Our Fault	Guest Performer (cameo)	Amazon Prime Video production, performed the song "Quiero Decirte"	

=== Soundtrack contributions ===
Year	Title	Notes	Ref
2013	Frozen	Sang "La Puerta Hacia el Amor" for the European Spanish soundtrack	
2015	Minions	Sang Spanish credits song "Mellow Yellow"	
2014	Invizimals	Performed entire soundtrack for the video game TV series	

== Awards and nominations ==
=== iHeartRadio Music Awards ===
Year	Nominee / work	Award	Result
2018	Himself	Best New Latin Artist	Nominated

=== Premios Juventud ===
Year	Nominee / work	Award	Result
2013	Himself	Artist Revelation	Nominated
2016	Himself	Voice of the Moment	Nominated
2016	Himself	My Pop/Rock Artist	Nominated
2016	"Así Es Tu Amor"	Heart-Wrenching Song	Nominated

=== Nickelodeon Kids' Choice Awards ===
Year	Nominee / work	Award	Result
2014	Himself	Best Spanish Artist	Won
2017	Himself	Best Spanish Artist	Won

=== Nickelodeon Mexico Kids' Choice Awards ===
Year	Nominee / work	Award	Result
2016	Himself	Favorite International Artist	Nominated

=== Radio Disney Music Awards ===
Year	Nominee / work	Award	Result
2016	Himself	Best Spanish Artist	Won
