= Insomnio (Abraham Mateo album) =

Studio album by Abraham Mateo
- Released: 5 April 2024
- Recorded: 2023–2024
- Studio: La Nave (Madrid, Spain)
- Genre: Latin pop, electronic, bachata
- Label: Sony Music Spain
- Producer: Abraham Mateo, Dani Ruiz, Garabatto, Max Borghetti, Rebbel, David Cuello, Came, Kickbombo, Tunvao, Sherman & Fine

Abraham Mateo chronology
Sigo a lo mío (2020)	Insomnio (2024)

Insomnio is the seventh studio album by Spanish singer Abraham Mateo, released on 5 April 2024 by Sony Music Spain. The 16-track album blends Latin pop, electronic and bachata influences. It includes collaborations with artists such as Ana Mena, Chanel, Omar Montes, Sebastián Yatra, Danny Ocean, and Rorro.

== Release and promotion ==
Insomnio was officially released on 5 April 2024 through digital platforms. To celebrate the launch, Mateo hosted a themed pajama party in Madrid.

He went on the Insomnio Tour to promote the album, with concerts in Spain and Latin America. Notable performances included shows at the Teatro Metropólitan in Mexico City and the Teatro Opera in Buenos Aires, and the Starlite Festival in Marbella. Mateo also appeared as a guest performer at the final of the Benidorm Fest. where he presented a tango-inspired version of "Clavaíto", and at the Junior Eurovision Song Contest 2024, where he performed a Spanish-language adaptation of "Maniac" live.

== Reception ==
The album was awarded "Best Album of the Year" at the LOS40 Music Awards 2024, and received a nomination for "Best Pop Album" at the 2024 Spanish Academy of Music Awards. In Spain, Insomnio debuted at number 13 on the official albums chart (PROMUSICAE), and remained on the charts for 22 weeks.

== Track listing ==
#	Title	Writer(s)	Producer(s)	Length
1	"Me Acuerdo de Ti"	Abraham Mateo, Garabatto, Daniel Rondón, Edu Ruiz, Jose Cano	Abraham Mateo, Garabatto	3:06
2	"Quiero Decirte" (feat. Ana Mena)	Abraham Mateo, Ana Mena, Jose Cano, Timor Shait	Abraham Mateo, Dani Ruiz	3:42
3	"Riendo Y Llorando"	Abraham Mateo, Jose Cano, Max Borghetti, Timor Shait	Abraham Mateo, Max Borghetti, Rebbel	3:15
4	"La Idea"	Abraham Mateo, Jose Cano	Abraham Mateo, David Cuello	3:14
5	"Me Quedaré"	Abraham Mateo, Carlos Vidal Mejías, Edu Ruiz, Jaime Cosculluela, Jose Cano	Abraham Mateo, Came	2:33
6	"Bailarina" (feat. Danny Ocean)	Abraham Mateo, Joan Valls, Rubén Pérez, Daniel Alejandro Morales, Edu Ruiz, Jose Cano, Juan Manuel Vargas	Abraham Mateo, Kickbombo	3:06
7	"Maníaca"	Abraham Mateo, Dennis Matkosky, Jose Cano, Max Borghetti, Michael Sembello	Abraham Mateo, Dani Ruiz	2:55
8	"Billete de Vuelta"	Abraham Mateo, Antonio Mateo, Jose Cano	Abraham Mateo	2:59
9	"Supermal"	Abraham Mateo, Dani Ruiz, Edu Ruiz, Estéfano Berciano, Jose Cano	Abraham Mateo, Dani Ruiz, David Cuello	2:38
10	"Falsos Recuerdos" (feat. Omar Montes)	Abraham Mateo, Andrés Jael Correa Ríos, Estéfano Berciano, Jose Cano, Omar Montes	Tunvao	3:11
11	"Clavaíto" (feat. Chanel)	Abraham Mateo, Chanel Terrero, Jose Cano	Abraham Mateo, Dani Ruiz	2:43
12	"Me di Cuenta"	Abraham Mateo, Jose Cano	Abraham Mateo, David Cuello	3:13
13	"Incomplete"	Abraham Mateo, Jose Cano	Abraham Mateo, Sherman & Fine	3:00
14	"XQ Sigues Pasando:(" (feat. Sebastián Yatra)	Manuel Lorente Freire, Abraham Mateo, Daniel Oviedo, Jesús Oviedo, Jose Cano, Sebastián Obando Giraldo	Abraham Mateo, Dani Ruiz	3:35
15	"Desgraciaíta" (feat. Rorro)	Abraham Mateo, Dani Ruiz, Edu Ruiz, Jose Cano, Manuel López-Quiroga, Rafael de León Arias de Saavedra, Rocío Aguilar, Salvador Federico Valverde	Abraham Mateo, Dani Ruiz	2:50
16	"El Amanecer"	Abraham Mateo, Jose Cano	Abraham Mateo	2:51
Total length:				49:50
