= List of songs recorded by Laura Pausini =

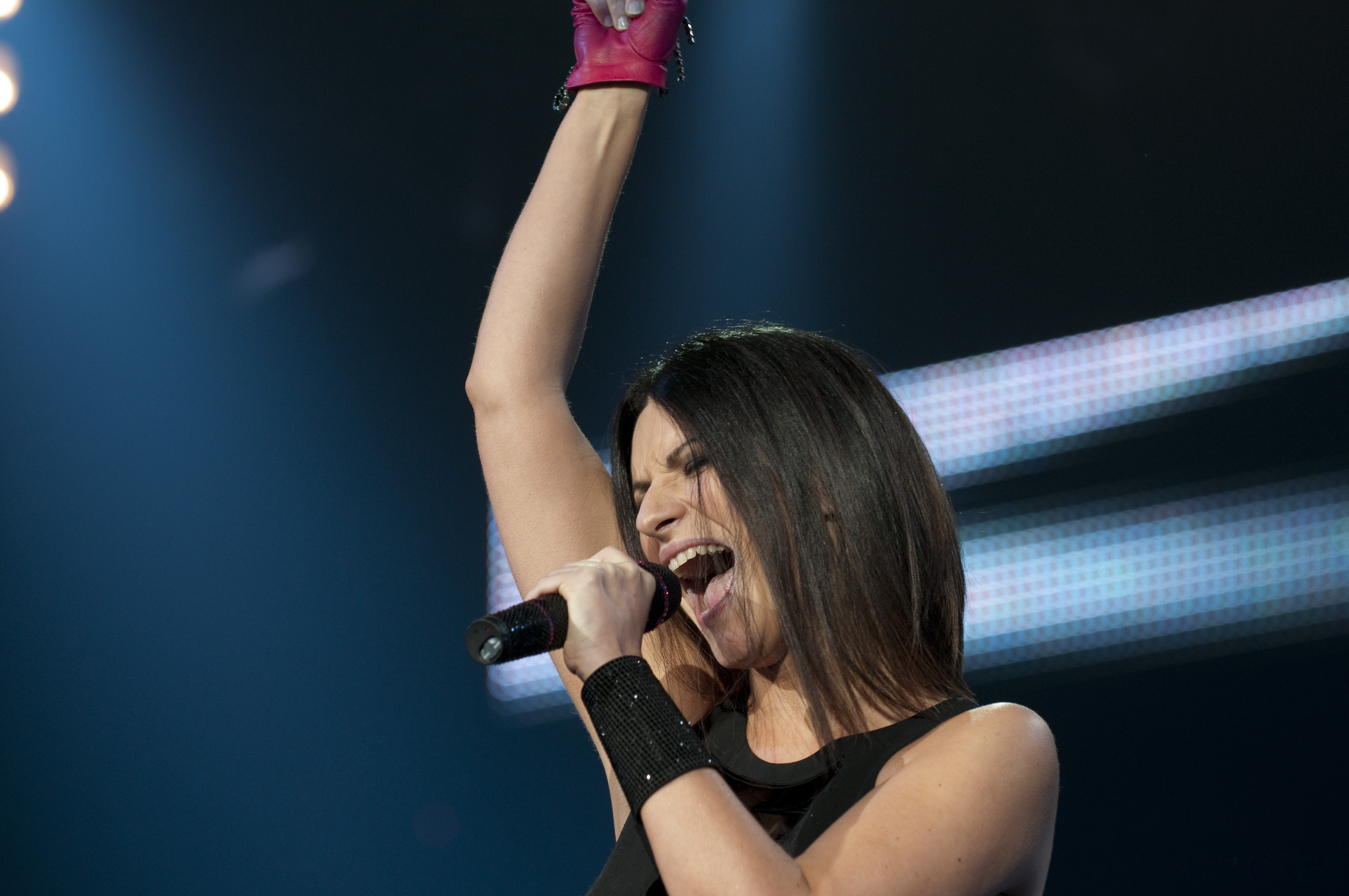
Pausini performing during her World Tour 2009 in Barcelona

Italian pop singer Laura Pausini rose to fame in 1993 when she won the Sanremo Music Festival in the "Newcomers' Section" with the song "La solitudine". Following the success of her Italian-language albums Laura Pausini (1993) and Laura (1994), Pausini released an eponymous Spanish-language compilation album in 1994. Starting from her third full-length record, she recorded her albums both in Italian and Spanish, with the exception of 2002's From the Inside, her only English-language album composed of new material, and the holiday album Laura Xmas (2016), released in English and Spanish. Occasionally, she also recorded songs in Portuguese, French, Catalan and in Italian dialects such as Neapolitan and Sicilian.

Additionally, her recordings include several live performances, both of her own material and of songs originally by other artists. She appeared in the soundtrack of Message in a Bottle (1999), as well as in albums by several Italian and international artists, including Josh Groban, Gloria Estefan, Fiorella Mannoia, Andrea Bocelli, Elio e le Storie Tese, Nek, Miguel Bosé, Charles Aznavour, and Juan Gabriel. Pausini also took part in multiple charity releases: she was one of the artists performing "Todo para ti", the Spanish version of Michael Jackson's "What More Can I Give" (2003); in 2009, she recorded the track "Domani 21/04.09" as part of the Italian supergroup Artisti Uniti per l'Abruzzo, raising funds to support the victims of the 2009 L'Aquila earthquake; later during the same year, she promoted the project Amiche per l'Abruzzo, for which she recorded a live album together with several Italian female artists, also producing the single "Donna d'Onna"; finally, as part of the project Artists for Chile, she took part in the recording of a cover of Violeta Parra's "Gracias a la Vida", in response of the 2010 Chile earthquake.

== Songs ==
Symbols
† Indicates songs released as singles

List of songs, showing songwriters, originating album and first release year
	Title	Year	Album^{[A]}	Writers^{[B]}	Other released versions
	"16/5/74"	1996	Le cose che vivi	Cheope, Giuseppe Carella	"16/5/1974" – from Las cosas que vives (1996) – Spanish version
†	"200 note"	2015	Simili	Tony Maiello, Lorenzo Vizzini Bisaccia	"200 notas" – from Similares (2015) – Spanish version
	"Abrázame muy fuerte" (Juan Gabriel feat. Laura Pausini)	2015	Los dúo	Juan Gabriel	
	"Adeste Fideles"	2016	Laura Xmas	John Francis Wade	
	"Amare veramente"	2004	Resta in ascolto	Laura Pausini, Cesare Chiodo	"Amar completamente" – from Escucha (2004) – Spanish version
	"Amori infiniti"	1994	Laura	Cheope, Stefano Jurgens, Marco Marati, Angelo Valsiglio, Roberto Buti	
	"Anche se non mi vuoi"	2000	Tra te e il mare	Laura Pausini, Giuseppe Dati, Cheope, Antonio Galbiati, Federica Fratoni	"Si no me quieres hoy" – from Entre tú y mil mares (2000) – Spanish version
	"Angeli nel blu"	1996	Le cose che vivi	Cheope, Leonello Meneghetti, Eric Buffat, Leonardo Abbate	"Ángeles en el cielo" – from Las cosas que vives (1996) – Spanish version; "Angeli nel blu" – from Live 2001–2002 (2002) – live in Milan
	"Anima fragile"	2006	Io canto	Vasco Rossi	"Corazón frágil" – from Yo canto (2006) – Spanish version
	"Anna dimmi sì"	1998	La mia risposta	Laura Pausini, Eric Buffat	"Ana dime si" – from Mi respuesta (1998) – Spanish version
	"Anni miei"	1994	Laura	Cheope, Marco Marati, Angelo Valsiglio, Salvatore Monetti	
†	"Ascolta il tuo cuore"	1996	Le cose che vivi	Cheope, Fabrizio Pausini, Vito Mastrofrancesco, Alberto Mastrofrancesco, Charles Cohiba	"Escucha a tu corazón" – from Las cosas que vives (1996) – Spanish version; "Ascolta il tuo cuore" – from Live 2001–2002 (2002) – live in Milan; "Ascolta il tuo cuore" – from San Siro 2007 (2007) – live in Milan
	"Astro del ciel"	2016	Laura Xmas	Joseph Mohr, Franz Xaver Gruber, Angelo Meli	"Noche de paz"" – from Laura Navidad (2016) – Spanish version
	"Baci che si rubano"	1993	Laura Pausini	Angelo Valsiglio, Pietro Cremonesi, Federico Cavalli	
†	"Bastava"	2011	Inedito	Laura Pausini, Niccolò Agliardi, Massimiliano Pelan	"Bastaba" – from Inédito (2011) – Spanish version; "Bastava" – from Inedito* (2012) – live; "Bastaba" – from Inédito* (2012) – live
	"Bellissimo così"	2008	Primavera in anticipo	Laura Pausini, Cheope, Federica Fratoni, Daniele Coro	"Bellísimo así" – from Primavera anticipada (2008) – Spanish version; "Bellísimo así" – from Laura Live (2009) – included in "Medley Soft", live in Barcelona; "Bellissimo così" – from Inedito* (2012) – included in "Medley Dance", live
†	"Benedetta passione"	2004	Resta in ascolto	Vasco Rossi, Gaetano Curreri, Saverio Grandi	"Bendecida pasión" – from Escucha (2004) – Spanish version; "Benedetta passione" – from Live in Paris 05 (2005) – live in Paris; "Benedetta passione" – from San Siro 2007 (2007) – included in a medley, live in Milan; "Benedetta passione" – from Laura Live (2009) – included in "Medley Rock", live in Locarno; "Bendecida pasión" – from Laura Live (2009) – included in "Medley Rock", live in Los Angeles
†	"Benvenuto"	2011	Inedito	Laura Pausini, Niccolò Agliardi, Paolo Carta	"Bienvenido" – from Inédito (2011) – Spanish version; "Benvenuto" – from Inedito* (2012) – live; "Bienvenido" – from Inédito* (2012) – live; "Bienvenido" – from Encanto del Caribe: Arthur Hanlon and Friends (2012) – Arthur Hanlon feat. Laura Pausini
	"Black or White" (live, in a medley with "Papa Don't Preach")	2012	Inedito*	Michael Jackson, Bill Bottrell	
	"Buone verità"	1998	La mia risposta	Laura Pausini, Giorgio Vanni, Massimo Longhi	"Una gran verdad" – from Mi respuesta (1998) – Spanish version
	"Cani e gatti"	1994	Laura	Cheope, Angelo Valsiglio, Giuseppe Carella	
	"Casomai" (soundcheck)	2006	Laura Live World Tour 09	Laura Pausini, Cheope, Daniel Vuletic	"Menos mal" – from Laura Live (2009) – Spanish version
	"Caruso" (live) (with Jovanotti)	2009	The Tribute to Pavarotti – One Amazing Weekend in Petra	Lucio Dalla	
†	"Celeste"	2011	Inedito	Laura Pausini, Beppe Dati, Goffredo Orlandi	"Así celeste" – from Inédito (2011) – Spanish version; "Celeste" – from Inedito* (2012) – included in "Medley Luna", live
	"Chiedilo al cielo"	2015	Simili	Laura Pausini, Niccolò Agliardi, Paolo Carta	"Pregúntale al cielo" – from Similares (2015) – Spanish version
	"Cinque giorni"	2006	Io canto	Michele Zarrillo, Vincenzo Incenzo	"Cinco días" – from Yo canto (2006) – Spanish version; "Cinque giorni" – from San Siro 2007 (2007) – included in a medley, live in Milan
	"Che bene mi fai"	1998	La mia risposta	Laura Pausini, Cheope, Eric Buffat	"Me siento tan bien" – from Mi respuesta (1998) – Spanish version
	"Che storia è"	1996	Le cose che vivi	Cheope, Fabrizio Pausini, Gabriele Fersini	"¿Qué historia es?" – from Las cosas que vives (1996) – Spanish version
	"Colpevole"	2015	Simili	Laura Pausini, Niccolò Agliardi, Daniel Vuletic	"Culpable" – from Similares (2015) – Spanish version
	"Come il sole all'improvviso" (feat. Johnny Hallyday)	2006	Io canto	Zucchero, Gino Paoli	"Come il sole all'improvviso" – from Io canto* (2006) – solo version; "Como el sol inesperado" – from Yo canto (2006) – Spanish solo version; "Come il sole all'improvviso" – from San Siro 2007 (2007) – included in a medley, live in Milan
†	"Come se non fosse stato mai amore"	2004	Resta in ascolto	Laura Pausini, Cheope, Daniel	"Como si no nos hubiéramos amado" – from Escucha (2004) – Spanish version; "Come se non fosse stato mai amore" – from Live in Paris 05 (2005) – included in a medley, live in Paris; "Come se non fosse stato mai amore" – from San Siro 2007 (2007) – live in Milan; "Come se non fosse stato mai amore" – from Laura Live (2009) – live in Florence; "Como si no nos hubiéramos amado" – from Laura Live (2009) – live in Barcelona; "Come se non fosse stato mai amore" – from Inedito* (2012) – live; "Como si no nos hubiéramos amado" – from Inédito* (2012) – live
	"Come si fa"	2000	Tra te e il mare	Laura Pausini, Marco Falagiani	"Cómo se hará" – from Entre tú y mil mares (2000) – Spanish version
	"Come una danza"	1998	La mia risposta	Laura Pausini, Cheope, Eric Buffat	"Como una danza" – from Mi respuesta (1998) – Spanish version
	"Come vivi senza me"	2011	Inedito	Laura Pausini, Daniel Vuletic, Cheope	"Como vives tú sin mi" – from Inédito (2011) – Spanish version
	"Como tú y como yo" (Sin Bandera feat. Laura Pausini)	2005	Mañana	Leonel García, Noel Schajris	
	"Con la musica alla radio"	2009	Laura Live World Tour 09	Laura Pausini, Cheope, Daniel Vuletic	"Con la musica en la radio" – from Laura Live (2009) – Spanish version; "Con la musica alla radio" – from Inedito* (2012) – live; "Con la musica en la radio" – from Inédito* (2012) – live; "Con la musica alla radio" – from 20 – The Greatest Hits (2013) – re-arranged; "Con la musica en la radio" – from 20 – Grandes éxitos (2013) – re-arranged
	"Con tutto l'amore che posso" (Claudio Baglioni feat. Laura Pausini & Stefano di Battista)	2009	Q.P.G.A.	Claudio Baglioni, Antonio Coggio	
	"Convivendo" (live, Biagio Antonacci feat. Laura Pausini)	2014	Palco Antonacci – San Siro 2014 – L'amore comporta	Biagio Antonacci	
	"Così importante"	2004	Resta in ascolto	Laura Pausini, Cesare Chiodo	"Tan importante" – from Escucha (2004) – Spanish version; "Così importante" – from Live in Paris 05 (2005) – live in Paris
†	"Destinazione paradiso"	2006	Io canto	Gianluca Grignani, Massimo Luca	"Destino paraíso" – from Yo canto (2006) – Spanish version; "Destinazione paradiso" – from San Siro 2007 (2007) – live in Milan
	"Dime" (Laura Pausini & José El Francés)	2001	Lo mejor de Laura Pausini: Volveré junto a ti	José Rodríquez Vázquez	
	"Do I Dare"	2002	From the Inside	Evan Rogers, Carl Sturken	
	"Domani 21/04.09" (Artisti Uniti per l'Abruzzo)	2009	Non-album track	Mauro Pagani	
†	"Donna d'Onna" (live) (with Gianna Nannini, Elisa, Giorgia & Fiorella Mannoia)	2010	Amiche per l'Abruzzo	Gianna Nannini, Isabella Santacroce	
	"Dove l'aria è polvere"	2004	Resta in ascolto	Laura Pausini, Cheope, Antonio Galbiati	"Donde el aire es ceniza" – from Escucha (2004) – Spanish version
†	"Dove resto solo io"	2013	20 – The Greatest Hits	Laura Pausini, Virginio Simonelli	"Donde quedo solo yo" – from 20 – Grandes éxitos (2013) – Spanish version; "Donde quedo solo yo" – from 20 – Grandes éxitos (2014) – with Álex Ubago; "Jo sempre hi seré" – from El disc de La Marató 2014 (2014) – Catalan version
	"Dove sei"	1993	Laura Pausini	Angelo Valsiglio, Pietro Cremonesi, Federico Cavalli	"Dove sei" – from Laura Live (2009) – included in "Medley Pop", live in Barcelona; "Dove sei" – from San Siro 2007 (2007) – included in a medley, live in Milan
	"Due"	2006	Io canto	Raf, Cheope	"Dos" – from Yo canto (2006) – Spanish version; "Due" – from San Siro 2007 (2007) – live in Milan
	"Due innamorati come noi"	1996	Le cose che vivi	Cheope, Roberto Buti, Roberto Capaccioli	"Dos enamorados" – from Las cosas que vives (1996) – Spanish version; "Apaixonados como nós" – from Le cose che vivi (1996) – Portuguese version; "Apaixonados como nós" – from San Siro 2007 (2007) – included in a medley, live in Milan; "Due innamorati come noi" – from Laura Live (2009) – included in "Medley Soft", live in Bergamo
	"È a lei che devo l'amore" (feat. Paolo Carta & Paola Carta)	2015	Simili	Biagio Antonacci	"A ella le debo mi amor" – from Similares (2015) – Spanish version, with Paolo Carta & Paola Carta
	"È, non è"	2006	Io canto*	Niccolò Fabi	"Es, no es" – from Yo canto (2006) – Spanish version
	"E penso a te" (live) (Fiorella Mannoia & Laura Pausini)	2010	Amiche per l'Abruzzo	Lucio Battisti, Mogol	
	"E poi" (live in Rome)	2009	Laura Live World Tour 09	Giorgia Todrani, Massimo Calabrese, Marco Rinalduzzi	
†	"E ritorno da te"	2001	The Best of Laura Pausini: E ritorno da te	Laura Pausini, Cheope, Daniel	"Volveré junto a ti" – from Lo mejor de Laura Pausini: Volveré junto a ti (2001) – Spanish version; "E ritorno da te" – from Live 2001–2002 (2002) – live in Milan; "E ritorno da te" – from Live in Paris 05 (2005) – live in Paris; "E ritorno da te" – from San Siro 2007 (2007) – live in Milan; "E ritorno da te" – from Laura Live (2009) – live in Barletta; "Volveré junto a ti" – from Laura Live (2009) – live in Santiago de Chile; "E ritorno da te" – from 20 – The Greatest Hits (2013) – re-arranged; "Volveré junto a ti" – from 20 – Grandes éxitos (2013) – re-arranged
	"E ti prometterò" (Josh Groban feat. Laura Pausini)	2013	All That Echoes	Josh Groban, Lester Mendez, Tawgs Salter, Marco Marinangeli	
†	"E.STA.A.TE"	2018	Fatti sentire	Laura Pausini, Virginio Simonelli, Paolo Carta	"Está.allá" – from Hazte sentir (2018) – Spanish version
	"Every Little Thing You Do"	2002	From the Inside	Stephanie Bentley, George Teren	"Every Little Thing You Do" (Piano/Vocal Reprise) – from From the Inside (2002) – re-arranged
	"Fantastico (Fai quello che sei)"	2018	Fatti sentire	Laura Pausini, Eric Silver, Nikki Williams, Enrico Nigiotti, Samuel Galvagno	"Fantástico (Haz lo que eres)" – from Hazte sentir (2018) – Spanish version
	"Favola" (live)	2007	San Siro 2007	Eros Ramazzotti, Piero Cassano, Adelio Cogliati	
	"Feliz Navidad"	2016	Laura Xmas	José Feliciano	
†	"Fidati di me"	2000	Tra te e il mare	Laura Pausini, Giuseppe Dati, Cheope, Giuseppe Tosetto	"Fíate de mí" – from Entre tú y mil mares (2000) – Spanish version; "Fidati di me" – from Live 2001–2002 (2002) – live in Milan; "Fidati di me" – from Live in Paris 05 (2005) – included in a medley, live in Paris
	"Francesca (piccola aliena)"	2018	Fatti sentire	Laura Pausini, Daniel Vuletic	"Francesca" – from Hazte sentir (2018) – Spanish version
†	"Frasi a metà"	2018	Fatti sentire	Laura Pausini, Niccolò Agliardi, Edwin Roberts	"Verdades a medias" – from Hazte sentir (2018) – Spanish version; "Verdades a medias" – non-album release (2020) – Spanish version, with Bebe
†	"Gente"	1994	Laura	Cheope, Marco Marati, Angelo Valsiglio	"Gente" – from Laura Pausini (1994) – Spanish version; "Gente (Ordinary People)" (Italian) – from The Best of (2001) – re-arranged; "Gente (Ordinary People)" (Spanish) – from Lo mejor de (2001) – re-arranged; "Gente" (Italian) – from Live 2001–2002 (2002) – live in Milan; "Gente" (Italian) – from Live in Paris 05 (2005) – live in Paris; "Gente" (Italian) – from San Siro 2007 (2007) – live in Milan; "Gente" (Spanish) – from Laura Live (2009) – included in "Medley Pop", live in Barcelona; "Gente" (Italian) – from Inedito* (2012) – included in "Medley Luna", live; "Gente" (Italian) – from 20 – The Greatest Hits (2013) – re-arranged; "Gente" (Spanish) – from 20 – Grandes éxitos (2013) – re-arranged
	"Gocce di memoria" (live) (Giorgia & Laura Pausini)	2010	Amiche per l'Abruzzo	Giorgia Todrani, Andrea Guerra	
†	"Gracias a la Vida" (Artists for Chile)	2010	Non-album track	Violeta Parra	
	"Happy Xmas (War Is Over)"	2016	Laura Xmas	John Lennon, Yoko Ono	
	"Have Yourself a Merry Little Christmas"	2016	Laura Xmas	Ralph Blane, Hugh Martin	
	"Heal the World" (live)	2009	Laura Live World Tour 09	Michael Jackson	
	"Historia de un amor" (Lucho Gatica feat. Laura Pausini)	2013	Historia de un amor	Carlos Eleta Almarán	
†	"Ho creduto a me"	2015	Simili	Niccolò Agliardi, Massimiliano Pelan	"He creído en mí" – from Similares (2015) – Spanish version
	"I Do To Be"	2002	From the Inside	Kara DioGuardi, Ulf Lindström, Johan Ekhé, Jessica Pihlnäs	
†	"I Need Love"	2002	From the Inside	Kara DioGuardi, Ulf Lindström, Johan Ekhé	"De tu amor" – from Resta in ascolto* (2004) – Spanish version
†	"If That's Love"	2002	From the Inside	Andrew Logan, Pam Reswick	
	"Il caso è chiuso"	2018	Fatti sentire	Laura Pausini, Cheope, Daniel Vuletic	"El caso está perdido" – from Hazte sentir (2018) – Spanish version
	"Il coraggio che non c'è"	1994	Laura	Cheope, Marco Marati, Angelo Valsiglio	"El valor que no se ve" – from Laura Pausini (1994) – Spanish version
†	"Il coraggio di andare"	2018	Fatti sentire	Laura Pausini, Tony Maiello, Marco Salvati, Enrico Palmosi, Marco Rettani	"El valor de seguir adelante" – from Hazte sentir (2018) – Spanish version; "Il coraggio di andare" – from Fatti sentire ancora (2018) – with Biagio Antonacci; "El valor de seguir adelante" – from Hazte sentir más (2018) – Spanish version, with Biagio Antonacci
	"Il cuore non si arrende"	1993	Laura Pausini	Angelo Valsiglio, Pietro Cremonesi, Federico Cavalli	
	"Il mio beneficio"	2008	Primavera in anticipo	Laura Pausini, Cheope, Daniel Vuletic	"Mis beneficios" – from Primavera anticipada (2008) – Spanish version; "Il mio beneficio" – from Laura Live (2009) – included in "Medley Rock", live in Locarno; "Mis beneficios" – from Laura Live (2009) – included in "Medley Rock", live in Los Angeles
	"Il mio canto libero" (feat. Juanes)	2006	Io canto	Lucio Battisti, Mogol	"Il mio canto libero" – from Io canto* (2006) – solo version; "Mi libre canción" – from Yo canto (2006) – Spanish version, feat. Juanes; "Mi libre canción" – from Yo canto* (2006) – solo version; "Mi libre canción" – from San Siro 2007 (2007) – included in a medley, live in Milan
†	"Il mio sbaglio più grande"	2000	Tra te e il mare	Laura Pausini, Giuseppe Dati, Cheope, Andreas Carlsson, Alistair Thomson	"Un error de los grandes"– from Entre tú y mil mares (2000) – Spanish version; "Il mio sbaglio più grande" – from Live 2001–2002 (2002) – live in Milan; "Everyday Is a Monday" – from From the Inside (2002) – English version; "Un error de los grandes" – from Laura Live (2009) – included in "Medley Pop", live in Barcelona
	"Il mondo che vorrei"	1996	Le cose che vivi	Laura Pausini, Eric Buffat, Gianni Salvatori	"El mundo que soñé" – from Las cosas que vives (1996) – Spanish version; "Il mondo che vorrei" – from Live 2001–2002 (2002) – live in Milan; "Il mondo che vorrei" – from Live in Paris 05 (2005) – included in a medley, live in Paris; "Il mondo che vorrei" – from The Tribute to Pavarotti – One Amazing Weekend in Petra (2009) – live in Petra
	"Il nostro amore quotidiano"	2015	Simili	Laura Pausini, Niccolò Agliardi; Paolo Carta	"Nuestro amor de cada día" – from Similares (2015) – Spanish version
	"Il tuo nome in maiuscolo"	2004	Resta in ascolto	Laura Pausini, Cheope, Daniel	"Tu nombre en mayúsculas" – from Escucha (2004) – Spanish version; "Il tuo nome in maisucolo" – from Live in Paris 05 (2005) – live in Paris; "Il tuo nome in maisucolo" – from Laura Live (2009) – included in "Medley Soft", live in Bergamo
†	"In assenza di te"	1998	La mia risposta	Laura Pausini, Cheope, Antonio Galbiati	"En ausencia de ti" – from Mi respuesta (1998) – Spanish version; "In assenza di te" – from Live 2001–2002 (2002) – live in Milan; "It's Not Goodbye" – from From the Inside (2002) – English version; "In assenza di te" – from Live in Paris 05 (2005) – live in Paris; "In assenza di te" – from San Siro 2007 (2007) – included in a medley, live in Milan; "In assenza di te" – from Laura Live (2009) – included in "Medley Soft", live in Bergamo; "In assenza di te" – from 20 – The Greatest Hits* (2013) – re-arranged; "It's Not Goodbye" – from 20 – The Greatest Hits (2013) – re-arranged; "En ausencia de ti" – from 20 – Grandes éxitos (2013) – re-arranged
	"In una stanza quasi rosa"	2006	Io canto	Biagio Antonacci	"En un cuarto casi rosa" – from Yo canto (2006) – Spanish version
†	"Incancellabile"	1996	Le cose che vivi	Cheope, Giuseppe Carella, Fabrizio Baldoni, Gino De Stefani	"Inolvidable" – from Las cosas que vives (1996) – Spanish version; "Inesquecivel" – from Le cose che vivi (1996) – Portuguese version; "Incancellabile" – from Live 2001–2002 (2002) – live in Milan; "Incancellabile" – from Live in Paris 05 (2005) – live in Paris; "Incancellabile" – from San Siro 2007 (2007) – live in Milan; "Incancellabile" – from Laura Live (2009) – included in "Medley Soft", live in Bergamo; "Incancellabile" – from 20 – The Greatest Hits (2013) – re-arranged; "Inolvidable" – from 20 – Grandes éxitos (2013) – re-arranged
	"Inedito" (feat. Gianna Nannini)	2011	Inedito	Laura Pausini, Daniel Vuletic, Cheope	"Inédito (Lo exacto opuesto de ti)" – from Inédito (2011) – Spanish version, feat. Gianna Nannini; "Inedito" – from Inedito* (2011) – Solo version; "Inédito (Lo exacto opuesto de ti)" – from Inedito* (2011) – Solo version; "Inedito" – from Inedito* (2012) – live, solo version; "Inédito (Lo exacto opuesto de ti)" – from Inédito* (2012) – live, solo version
†	"Innamorata"	2015	Simili	Jovanotti, Riccardo Onori, Christian Rigano	"Enamorada" – from Similares (2015) – Spanish version
†	"Invece no"	2008	Primavera in anticipo	Laura Pausini, Niccolò Agliardi, Paolo Carta	"Agora não" – from Primavera in anticipo* (2008) – Portuguese version; "En cambio no" – from Primavera anticipada (2008) – Spanish version; "Invece no" – from Laura Live (2009) – live in Milan; "Invece no" – from Laura Live (2009) – included around the world; "En cambio no" – from Laura Live (2009) – included in "Medley Rock", live in Madrid; "Invece no" – from Inedito* (2012) – live
	"Io c'ero (+ amore x favore)"	2015	Simili	Laura Pausini, Paolo Carta, L'Aura	"Yo estuve (+ amor x favor)" – from Similares (2015) – Spanish version
†	"Io canto"	2006	Io canto	Riccardo Cocciante, Marco Luberti	"Yo canto" – from Yo canto (2006) – Spanish version; "Je chante (Io canto)" – from Io canto* (2006) – French-Italian version; "Io canto" – from San Siro 2007 (2007) – live in Milan; "Io canto" – from Laura Live (2009) – live in Malta; "Yo canto" – from Laura Live (2009) – live in Mexico City; "Io canto" – from Amiche per l'Abruzzo (2010) – live in Milan; "Io canto" – from Inedito* (2012) – live; "Yo canto" – from Inédito* (2012) – live; "Io canto/Je chante" – from 20 – The Greatest Hits (2013) – Italian-French version, with Lara Fabian
	"It's Beginning to Look a Lot Like Christmas"	2016	Laura Xmas	Meredith Willson	"Va a nevar" – from Laura Navidad (2016) – Spanish version
	"Jenny"	2000	Tra te e il mare	Laura Pausini, Giuseppe Dati, Cheope, Federica Fratoni, Sergio Vinci	"Jenny" (Spanish) – from Entre tú y mil mares (2000) – Spanish version
	"Jingle Bell Rock"	2016	Laura Xmas	Joe Beal, Jim Boothe	
	"Jingle Bells"	2016	Laura Xmas	James Pierpont	
	"L'impressione"	2008	Primavera in anticipo	Laura Pausini, Cheope, Daniel Vuletic	"La impresión" – from Primavera anticipada (2008) – Spanish version
	"L'ultima cosa che ti devo"	2018	Fatti sentire	Laura Pausini, Paolo Carta	"Algo que te debo" – from Hazte sentir (2018) – Spanish version
	"La felicità"	1998	La mia risposta	Laura Pausini, Cheope, Eric Buffat, Antonio Galbiati	"Felicidad" – from Mi respuesta (1998) – Spanish version
	"La geografia del mio cammino"	2008	Primavera in anticipo	Laura Pausini, Cheope, Niccolò Agliardi, Paolo Carta	"La geografía de mi camino" – from Primavera anticipada (2008) – Spanish version; "La geografia del mio cammino" – from Laura Live (2009) – live in Teramo; "La geografia del mio cammino" – from Inedito* (2012) – included in "Medley Luna", live
	"La Isla Bonita" (live)	2007	San Siro 2007	Madonna, Patrick Leonard, Bruce Gaitsch	
	"La loi du silence" (live) (Johnny Hallyday feat. Laura Pausini)	2006	Flashback tour*	Pierre Lamy, Marielle Hervé	
	"La mia banda suona il rock"	2006	Io canto	Ivano Fossati	"Y mi banda toca el rock" – from Yo canto (2006) – Spanish version; "Y mi banda toca el rock" – from San Siro 2007 (2007) – live in Milan; "La mia banda suona il rock" – from Laura Live (2009) – live in Cagliari; "La mia banda suona il rock" – from Inedito* (2012) – live; "Y mi banda toca el rock" – from Inédito* (2012) – live
†	"La mia risposta"	1998	La mia risposta	Laura Pausini, Cheope, Claudio Guidetti	"Mi respuesta" – from Mi respuesta (1998) – Spanish version; "La mia risposta" – from Live 2001–2002 (2002) – live in Milan; "La mia risposta" – from Live in Paris 05 (2005) – included in a medley, live in Paris
†	"La prospettiva di me"	2004	Resta in ascolto	Laura Pausini, Cheope, Daniel	"Mi perspectiva" – from Escucha (2004) – Spanish version; "La prospettiva di me" – from Live in Paris 05 (2005) – live in Paris; "La prospettiva di me" – from San Siro 2007 (2007) – included in a medley, live in Milan; "La prospettiva di me" – from Laura Live (2009) – included in "Medley Rock", live in Locarno; "Mi perspectiva" – from Laura Live (2009) – included in "Medley Rock", live in Los Angeles
†	"La solitudine"	1993	Laura Pausini	Angelo Valsiglio, Pietro Cremonesi, Federico Cavalli	"La soledad" – from Laura Pausini (1994) – Spanish version; "Loneliness" – from Laura Pausini (1995) – English version; "La solitudine" – from The Best of (2001) – re-arranged; "La soledad" – from Lo mejor de (2001) – re-arranged; "La solitudine" – from Live 2001–2002 (2002) – live in Milan; "La solitudine" – from Live in Paris 05 (2005) – live in Paris; "La solitudine" – from San Siro 2007 (2007) – live in Milan; "La solitudine" – from Laura Live (2009) – live in Naples; "La soledad" – from Laura Live (2009) – live in Barcelona; "La solitudine" – from Amiche per l'Abruzzo (2010) – live in Milan, with Gianna Nannini; "La solitudine"/"La soledad"/"Loneliness" – non-album release (2013) – Italian-Spanish-English medley; "La solitudine" – from 20 – The Greatest Hits (2013) – arranged by Ennio Morricone; "La soledad" – from 20 – Grandes éxitos (2013) – arranged by Ennio Morricone
†	"La soluzione"	2018	Fatti sentire	Laura Pausini, Massimiliano Pelan, Giulia Anania, Fabio De Martino, Stefano Paviani	"La solución" – from Hazte sentir (2018) – Spanish version; "La solución" – from Hazte sentir más (2018) – Spanish version, with Carlos Rivera
	"La voce"	1996	Le cose che vivi	Cheope, Fabrizio Pausini, Eric Buffat, Telonio	"La voz" – from Las cosas che vives (1996) – Spanish version
	"Lady Marmalade" (live) (feat. Syria and Paola & Chiara)	2012	Inedito*	Bob Crewe, Kenny Nolan	
†	"Lato destro del cuore"	2015	Simili	Biagio Antonacci	"Lado derecho del corazón" – from Similares (2015) – Spanish version
†	"Le cose che non mi aspetto"	2011	Inedito	Laura Pausini, Niccolò Agliardi, Luca Chiaravalli	"Las cosas que no me espero" – from Inédito (2011) – Spanish version; "Las cosas que no me espero" – from Inédito* (2012) – Spanish version, with Carlos Baute
†	"Le cose che vivi"	1996	Le cose che vivi	Cheope, Fabrizio Pausini, Giuseppe Carella, Fabrizio Baldoni, Gino De Stefani	"Las cosas que vives" – from Las cosas che vives (1996) – Spanish version; "Tudo o que eu vivo" – from Le cose che vivi (1996) – Portuguese version; "Le cose che vivi" – from Live 2001–2002 (2002) – live in Milan; "Le cose che vivi" – from Live in Paris 05 (2005) – live in Paris; "Le cose che vivi" – from San Siro 2007 (2007) – live in Milan; "Le cose che vivi" – from Laura Live (2009) – live in Palermo; "Le cose che vivi/Tudo o que eu vivo" – from 20 – The Greatest Hits (2013) – Italian-Portuguese version, re-arranged, with Ivete Sangalo; "Las cosas que vives/Tudo o que eu vivo" – from 20 – Grandes éxitos (2013) – Spanish-Portuguese version, re-arranged, with Ivete Sangalo
	"Le due finestre"	2018	Fatti sentire	Laura Pausini, Eric Silver, Nikki Williams, Enrico Nigiotti, Samuel Galvagno	"Dos ventanas" – from Hazte sentir (2018) – Spanish version
	"Let It Snow! Let It Snow! Let It Snow!"	2016	Laura Xmas	Sammy Cahn, Jule Styne	
†	"Lettera"	1994	Laura	Cheope, Marco Marati, Angelo Valsiglio, Giovanni Salvatori	"Carta" – from Laura Pausini (1994) – Spanish version; "Lettera" – from Live in Paris 05 (2005) – included in a medley, live in Paris
†	"Limpido" (feat. Kylie Minogue)	2013	20 – The Greatest Hits	Laura Pausini, Virginio Simonelli	"Limpido" – from 20 – The Greatest Hits (2013) – solo version; "Limpio" – from 20 – Grandes éxitos (2013) – Spanish solo version; "Limpio" – from 20 – Grandes éxitos (2013) – Spanish-English version, with Kylie Minogue; "Limpio" – from 20 – Grandes éxitos (2013) – Spanish version, with Kylie Minogue
	"Lo mejor está por llegar" (El Sueño de Morfeo feat. Laura Pausini, Deborah & Ximena Xariñana)	2013	Todos tenemos un sueño	Raquel del Rosario, David Feito, Juan Luis Suárez	
	"Lo sapevi prima tu"	2015	Simili	Laura Pausini, L'Aura, Simone Bertolotti	"Lo sabías antes tú" – from Similares (2015) – Spanish version
	"Looking for an Angel"	1998	La mia risposta	Phil Collins	
	"Love Comes from the Inside"	2002	From the Inside	Patrick Leonard, Olivia d'Abo	
	"Luce (Tramonti a nord est)" (live) (Elisa, Irene Grandi & Laura Pausini)	2010	Amiche per l'Abruzzo	Elisa Toffoli, Adelmo Fornaciari	
†	"Lui non sta con te"	1994	Laura	Cheope, Marco Marati, Angelo Valsiglio, Roberto Buti	"Él no está por ti" – from Laura Pausini (1994) – Spanish version
	"Medley New Year's Eve" (live)^{[C]}	2012	Inedito*	Various authors	
	"Mentre la notte va"	2000	Tra te e il mare	Laura Pausini, Giuseppe Dati, Cheope, Mario Lavezzi	"Mientras la noche va" – from Entre tú y mil mares (2000) – Spanish version
	"Meravigliosa creatura" (live, in a medley with "Sei nell'anima") (Gianna Nannini & Laura Pausini)	2010	Amiche per l'Abruzzo	Gianna Nannini, Mara Redeghieri	
	"Mi abbandono a te"	2004	Resta in ascolto	Madonna, Rick Nowels, Laura Pausini	"Me abandono a ti" – from Escucha (2004) – Spanish version; "Mi abbandono a te" – from Live in Paris 05 (2005) – included in a medley, live in Paris
	"Mi dispiace"	1996	Le cose che vivi	Giuseppe Dati, Goffredo Orlandi	"Lo siento" – from Las cosas che vives (1996) – Spanish version
	"Mi rubi l'anima" (Laura Pausini feat. Raf)	1993	Laura Pausini	Angelo Valsiglio, Pietro Cremonesi, Federico Cavalli	"Mi rubi l'anima" – from Live 2001–2002 (2002) – solo version, live in Milan; "Mi rubi l'anima" – from Live in Paris 05 (2005) – included in a medley, solo version, live in Paris
†	"Mi tengo"	2011	Inedito	Laura Pausini, Niccolò Agliardi, Matteo Bassi, Simone Bertolotti	"Me quedo" – from Inédito (2011) – Spanish version
	"Mille braccia"	2008	Primavera in anticipo	Laura Pausini, Cheope, Paolo Carta	"Alzando nuestros brazos" – from Primavera anticipada (2008) – Spanish version; "Mille braccia" – from Laura Live (2009) – live in Naples
	"Musica sarà"	2000	Tra te e il mare	Laura Pausini, Giuseppe Dati, Cheope, Daniel	"Música será" – from Entre tú y mil mares (2000) – Spanish version
	"Napule è" (live in Naples)	2009	Laura Live World Tour 09	Pino Daniele	
	"Nei giardini che nessuno sa"	2006	Io canto	Renato Zero, Danilo Riccardi	"En los jardines donde nadie va" – from Yo canto (2006) – Spanish version
	"Nel modo più sincero che c'è"	2008	Primavera in anticipo	Laura Pausini, Cheope, Daniel Vuletic	"Del modo más sincero" – from Primavera anticipada (2008) – Spanish version; "Nel modo più sincero che c'è" – from Laura Live (2009) – included in "Medley Soft", live in Bergamo
	"Nel primo sguardo" (feat. Silvia Pausini)	2011	Inedito	Laura Pausini, Niccolò Fabi, Paolo Carta	"A simple vista" – from Inédito (2011) – Spanish version; "No primeiro olhar" – from Inedito* (2011) – Portuguese version; "Dans le premier regard" – from Inedito* (2011) – French version; "Nel primo sguardo" – from Inedito* (2011) – Solo version; "Nel primo sguardo" – from Inedito* (2012) – live, solo version; "A simple vista" – from Inédito* (2012) – live
†	"Nella porta accanto"	2015	Simili	Laura Pausini, Massimo De Luca	"En la puerta de al lado" – from Similares (2015) – Spanish version
	"Nessuno sa"	2011	Inedito	Laura Pausini, Niccolò Agliardi, Paolo Carta	"Quién lo sabrá" – from Inédito (2011) – Spanish version; "Nessuno sa" – from Inedito* (2012) – included in "Medley Luna", live
	"No River Is Wilder"	2018	Fatti sentire	Laura Pausini, Paolo Carta	
†	"Non c'è"	1993	Laura Pausini	Angelo Valsiglio, Pietro Cremonesi, Federico Cavalli	"Se fue" – from Laura Pausini (1994) – Spanish version; "Non c'è" – from The Best of (2001) – feat. Nek on bass; "Se fue" – from Lo mejor de (2001) – feat. Nek on bass; "Non c'è" – from Live 2001–2002 (2002) – live in Milan; "Non c'è" – from Live in Paris 05 (2005) – live in Paris; "Se fue" – from Live in Paris 05 (2005) – live in Paris; "Se fue" – from Laura Live (2009) – live in Hollywood; "Non c'è" – from Inedito* (2012) – live; "Se fue" – from Inédito* (2012) – live; "Non c'è"/"Se fue" – from 20 – The Greatest Hits (2013) – feat. Marc Anthony; "Se fue" – from 20 – Grandes éxitos (2013) – feat. Marc Anthony
†	"Non è detto"	2018	Fatti sentire	Laura Pausini, Niccolò Agliardi, Edwyn Roberts, Gianluigi Fazio	"Nadie ha dicho" – from Hazte sentir (2018) – Spanish version; "Nadie ha dicho" – from Hazte sentir más (2018) – Spanish version with Gente De Zona
†	"Non ho mai smesso"	2011	Inedito	Laura Pausini, Niccolò Agliardi, Paolo Carta	"Jamás abandoné" – from Inédito (2011) – Spanish version; "Non ho mai smesso" – from Inedito* (2012) – live; "Jamás abandoné" – from Inédito* (2012) – live
	"Non insegnate ai bambini" (live)	2012	...Io ci sono	Giorgio Gaber, Sandro Luporini	
†	"Non me lo so spiegare" (feat. Tiziano Ferro)	2006	Io canto	Tiziano Ferro	"Non me lo so spiegare" – from Io canto* (2006) – solo version; "No me lo puedo explicar" – from Yo canto (2006) – Spanish version, with Tiziano Ferro; "No me lo puedo explicar" – from Yo canto* (2006) – Spanish solo version; "Non me lo so spiegare" – from San Siro 2007 (2007) – live in Milan, with Tiziano Ferro
	"Non sono lei"	2006	Laura Live World Tour 09	Laura Pausini, Cheope, Daniel Vuletic	"Ella no soy" – from Laura Live (2009) – Spanish version
†	"Novo"	2018	Fatti sentire	Laura Pausini, Yoel Henríquez, Daniel Vuletic	"Nuevo" – from Hazte sentir (2018) – Spanish version; "Novo" – from Fatti sentire ancora (2018) – with Simone & Simaria
	"Ogni colore al cielo"	2008	Primavera in anticipo	Laura Pausini, Cheope, Antonio Galbiati, Federica Fratoni, Paolo Carta	"Cada color al cielo" – from Primavera anticipada (2008) – Spanish version
	"Ognuno ha la sua matita"	2011	Inedito	Laura Pausini, Daniel Vuletic, Cheope	"Cada uno juega su partida" – from Inédito (2011) – Spanish version
	"Oh Happy Day"	2016	Laura Xmas	Edwin Hawkins	
†	"On n'oublie jamais rien, on vit avec" (Hélène Ségara and Laura Pausini)	2003	Humaine	Antoine Angelelli, Bruno Grimaldi, Gérard Capaldi	
†	"One More Time"	1999	Message in a Bottle	Richard Marx	"One More Time" – from Live 2001–2002 (2002) – live in Milan
	"Pagàno" (Elio e le Storie Tese feat. Laura Pausini)	2003	Cicciput	Stefano Belisari, Rocco Tanica, Cesareo, Faso	
	"Papa Don't Preach" (live, in a medley with "Black or White")	2012	Inedito*	Brian Elliot, Madonna	
	"Paris au mois d'aout" (Charles Aznavour feat. Laura Pausini)	2008	Duos	Charles Aznavour, Garvarentz	"Parigi in agosto" – from Duos (2008) – Italian version, with Charles Aznavour; "Paris au mois d'aout" – from Laura Live (2009) – live in Geneva, with Fabrizio Pausini
	"Parlami"	2004	Resta in ascolto	Laura Pausini, Cheope, Daniel	"Háblame" – from Escucha (2004) – Spanish version; "Parlami" – from San Siro 2007 (2007) – included in a medley, live in Milan; "Parlami" – from Laura Live (2009) – included in "Medley Rock", live in Locarno; "Háblame" – from Laura Live (2009) – included in "Medley Rock", live in Los Angeles
	"Per la musica" (feat. Official Fan Club Members Singers and Players)	2015	Simili	Laura Pausini, Niccolò Agliardi, Paolo Carta	"Es la música" – from Similares (2015) – Spanish version, with Official Fan Club Members Singers and Players
	"Per vivere"	2000	Tra te e il mare	Laura Pausini, Giuseppe Dati, Cheope, Fabrizio Baldoni, Gino De Stefani, Eric Buffat	"Viviré" – from Entre tú y mil mares (2000) – Spanish version
†	"Perché non torna più"	1993	Laura Pausini	Angelo Valsiglio, Pietro Cremonesi, Federico Cavalli	"¿Por qué no volverán?" – from Laura Pausini (1994) – Spanish version
	"Più di ieri"	2008	Primavera in anticipo	Laura Pausini, Cheope, Daniel Vuletic	"Más que ayer" – from Primavera anticipada (2008) – Spanish version
	"Prendo te"	2004	Resta in ascolto*	Laura Pausini	"Prendo te" – from San Siro 2007 (2007) – included in a medley, live in Milan; "Prendo te" – from Piano sin fronteras (2009) – Arthur Hanlon feat. Laura Pausini; "Prendo te" – from 20 – The Greatest Hits (2013) – re-arranged
	"Prima che esci"	2008	Primavera in anticipo	Gianluca Grignani	"Antes de irte" – from Primavera anticipada (2008) – Spanish version; "Prima che esci" – from Laura Live (2009) – included in "Medley Soft", live in Bergamo, duet with Gianluca Grignani
†	"Primavera in anticipo (It Is My Song)" (feat. James Blunt)	2008	Primavera in anticipo	Laura Pausini, Cheope, James Blunt, Daniel Vuletic	"Primavera in anticipo" – from Primavera in anticipo (2008) – fully Italian solo version; "Primavera anticipada (It Is My Song)" – from Primavera anticipada (2008) – Spanish-English version; "Primavera anticipada" – from Primavera anticipada (2008) – fully Spanish solo version; "Primavera in anticipo (It Is My Song)" – from Laura Live (2009) – live in Monza; "Primavera anticipada (It Is My Song)" – from Laura Live (2009) – live in Santo Domingo; "Primavera in anticipo (It Is My Song)" – from Amiche per l'Abruzzo (2010) – live in Milan, with Giorgia; "Primavera in anticipo (It Is My Song)" – from Inedito* (2012) – live; "Primavera anticipada (It Is My Song)" – from Inédito* (2012) – live
	"Quando"	2006	Io canto	Pino Daniele	"Cuando" – from Yo canto (2006) – Spanish version; "Quando" – from San Siro 2007 (2007) – included in a medley, live in Milan
	"Quanto tempo e ancora" (live, Biagio Antonacci feat. Laura Pausini)	2014	Palco Antonacci – San Siro 2014 – L'amore comporta	Biagio Antonacci	
	"Quello che le donne non dicono" (Fiorella Mannoia, Carmen Consoli, Elisa, Giorgia & Laura Pausini)	2010	Amiche per l'Abruzzo	Enrico Ruggeri, Luigi Schiavone	"Quello che le donne non dicono" – from Fiorella (2014) – studio version, Fiorella Mannoia feat. Laura Pausini
	"Ragazze che"	1994	Laura	Cheope, Marco Marati, Angelo Valsiglio, Roberto Buti	"Las chicas"– from Laura Pausini (1994) – Spanish version
†	"Resta in ascolto"	2004	Resta in ascolto	Laura Pausini, Cheope, Daniel	"Escucha atento" – from Escucha (2004) – Spanish version; "Escucha atento" – from Live in Paris 05 (2005) – live in Paris; "Resta in ascolto" – from Live in Paris 05 (2005) – live in Paris; "Resta in ascolto" – from San Siro 2007 (2007) – live in Milan; "Resta in ascolto" – from Laura Live (2009) – live in Brussels; "Escucha atento" – from Laura Live (2009) – live in Barcelona; "Resta in ascolto/Escucha atento" – from 20 – The Greatest Hits (2013) – Italian-Spanish version, live
	"Ricordami"	2000	Tra te e il mare	Laura Pausini, Giuseppe Dati, Cheope, Fabrizio Baldoni, Gino De Stefani	"Recuérdame" – from Entre tú y mil mares (2000) – Spanish version
	"Santa Claus Is Coming to Town"	2016	Laura Xmas	John Frederick Coots, Haven Gillespie	"Santa Claus llegó a la ciudad"" – from Laura Navidad (2016) – Spanish version
	"Scrivimi"	2006	Io canto	Nino Buonocore, Michele De Vitis	"Escríbeme" – from Yo canto (2006) – Spanish version; "Scrivimi" – from San Siro 2007 (2007) – included in a medley, live in Milan
†	"Se non te"	2013	20 – The Greatest Hits	Laura Pausini, Niccolò Agliardi, Paolo Carta	"Sino a ti" – from 20 – Grandes éxitos (2013) – Spanish version; "Sino a ti" – from 20 – Grandes éxitos (2014) – with Thalía
†	"Sei solo tu" (Nek feat. Laura Pausini)	2002	Le cose da difendere	Cheope, Nek	"Tan sólo tú" – from Las cosas que defenderé (2002) – Spanish version, with Nek
	"Sei nell'anima" (live, in a medley with "Meravigliosa creatura") (Gianna Nannini & Laura Pausini)	2010	Amiche per l'Abruzzo	Gianna Nannini, Gino Pacifico	
	"She (Uguale a lei)"	2006	Non-album track	Charles Aznavour, Herbert Kretzmer, Laura Pausini	"She (Uguale a lei)" – from San Siro 2007 (2007) – included in a medley, live in Milan; "She (Uguale a lei)" – from 20 – The Greatest Hits (2013) – re-arranged
	"Siamo noi"	2000	Tra te e il mare	Laura Pausini, Giuseppe Dati, Cheope, Eric Buffat	"Somos hoy" – from Entre tú y mil mares (2000) – Spanish version; "Somos hoy" – from Laura Live (2009) – included in "Medley Soft", live in Barcelona
†	"Simili"	2015	Simili	Laura Pausini, Niccolò Agliardi, Edwyn Roberts	Similares – from Similares (2015) – Spanish version
†	"Seamisai"	1996	Le cose che vivi	Cheope, Giuseppe Carella	"Cuando se ama" – from Las cosas que vives (1996) – Spanish version; "Seamisai" – from Live 2001–2002 (2002) – live in Milan; "Se ami sai (Sei que me amavas)" – from The Best of (2001) – Italian-Portuguese version, re-arranged, feat. Gilberto Gil; "Cuando se ama (Sei que me amavas)" – from Lo mejor de (2001) – Spanish-Portuguese version, re-arranged, feat. Gilberto Gil; "Cuando se ama (Sei que me amavas)" – from Live in Paris 05 (2005) – Spanish-Portuguese version, live in Paris
	"Sonríe (Smile)" (Gloria Estefan feat. Laura Pausini)	2013	The Standards	John Turner, Geoffrey Parsons	
	"Sono solo nuvole"	2015	Simili	Giuliano Sangiorgi	"Solo nubes" – from Similares (2015) – Spanish version
	"Sorella Terra"	2008	Primavera in anticipo	Laura Pausini, Cheope, Daniel Vuletic	"Hermana tierra" – from Primavera anticipada (2008) – Spanish version; "Sorella Terra" – from Laura Live (2009) – live in Turin
†	"Spaccacuore"	2006	Io canto	Samuele Bersani, Lucio Dalla, Giuseppe D'Onghia	"Dispárame, dispara" – from Yo canto (2006) – Spanish version; "Dispárame, dispara" – from San Siro 2007 (2007) – live in Milan; "Spaccacuore" – from Laura Live (2009) – included in "Medley Rock", live in Locarno; "Dispárame, dispara" – from Laura Live (2009) – included in "Medley Rock", live in Los Angeles
	"Speranza"	2001	The Best of Laura Pausini: E ritorno da te*	Marcelo Barbosa, Luiz Schiavon, Nil Bernardes	
	"Stanotte stai con me"	1998	La mia risposta	Laura Pausini, Cheope, Giuseppe Tosetto	"Quédate esta noche" – from Mi respuesta (1998) – Spanish version
	"Stella gemella"	2006	Io canto	Eros Ramazzotti, Giuseppe Tosetto, Mario Lavezzi, Adelio Cogliati	"Estrella gemela" – from Yo canto (2006) – Spanish version
	"Strada facendo"	2006	Io canto	Claudio Baglioni	"Por el camino" – from Yo canto (2006) – Spanish version
†	"Strani amori"	1994	Laura	Cheope, Marco Marati, Francesco Tanini, Angelo Valsiglio, Roberto Buti	"Amores extraños" – from Laura Pausini (1994) – Spanish version; "Strani amori" – from The Best of (2001) – re-arranged; "Amores extraños" – from Lo mejor de (2001) – re-arranged; "Strani amori" – from Live 2001–2002 (2002) – live in Milan; "Strani amori" – from Live in Paris 05 (2005) – live in Paris; "Strani amori" – from San Siro 2007 (2007) – included in a medley, live in Milan; "Amores extraños" – from Laura Live (2009) – live in New York; "Strani amori" – from Duetos (2010) – Renato Russo feat. Laura Pausini; "Strani amori" – from 20 – The Greatest Hits (2013) – re-arranged; "Amores extraños" – from 20 – Grandes éxitos (2013) – re-arranged
	"Succede al cuore"	1998	La mia risposta	Cheope, Salvatore Mario Ragusa	"Sucede a veces" – from Mi respuesta (1998) – Spanish version
†	"Surrender"	2002	From the Inside	Dane de Viller, Sean Hosein, Steven Smith, Anthony Anderson	"Surrender" – from Live in Paris 05 (2005) – live in Paris; "Surrender" – from San Siro 2007 (2007) – included in a medley, live in Milan; "Surrender" – from Laura Live (2009) – included in "Medley Soft", live in Bergamo; "Surrender" – from Inedito* (2012) – included in "Medley Dance", live; "Surrender" – from 20 – The Greatest Hits (2013) – re-arranged
†	"Surrender to Love" (Ray Charles feat. Laura Pausini)	2005	Genius & Friends	Narada Michael Walden, Sunny Hilden	
	"Te amaré" (Miguel Bosé feat. Laura Pausini)	2007	Papito	Miguel Bosé, Juan Carlos Calderón	
	"The Extra Mile"	2000	Tra te e il mare	Tina Arena, Andrew Frampton, Pamela Sheyne	
	"Ti dico addio"	2011	Inedito	Laura Pausini, Cheope, Daniel Vuletic	"Te digo adiós" – from Inédito (2011) – Spanish version
†	"Todo Para Ti" (Michael Jackson feat. Various Artists)	2003	Non-album track	Michael Jackson, Rubén Blades	
	"Todo vuelve a empezar" (Luis Fonsi feat. Laura Pausini)	2008	Palabras del Silencio	Claudia Brant, Luis Fonsi	
	"Tornerò (Con calma si vedrà)"	2015	Simili	Biagio Antonacci	"Regresaré (con calma se verá)" – from Similares (2015) – Spanish version
†	"Tra te e il mare"	2000	Tra te e il mare	Biagio Antonacci	"Entre tú y mil mares" – from Entre tú y mil mares (2000) – Spanish version; "Tra te e il mare" – from Live 2001–2002 (2002) – live in Milan, with Biagio Antonacci; "Entre tú y mil mares" – from Biagio Antonacci's Cuànto tiempo... y ahora – with Biagio Antonacci; "Tra te e il mare" – from Live in Paris 05 (2005) – live in Paris; "Tra te e il mare" – from San Siro 2007 (2007) – live in Milan; "Entre tú y mil mares" – from Laura Live (2009) – live in Madrid; "Tra te e il mare" – from Laura Live (2009) – live in Rome; "Tra te e il mare" – from Amiche per l'Abruzzo (2010) – live in Milan, with Elisa; "Tra te e il mare" – from 20 – The Greatest Hits (2013) – re-arranged; "Entre tú y mil mares" – from 20 – Grandes éxitos (2013) – re-arranged; "Entre tú y mil mares" – from 20 – Grandes éxitos (2014) – re-arranged, with Melendi; "Tra te e il mare" – from Palco Antonacci – San Siro 2014 – L'amore comporta (2014) – live in Milan, with Biagio Antonacci and Eros Ramazzotti
	"Troppo tempo" (feat. Ivano Fossati)	2011	Inedito	Ivano Fossati	"Hace tiempo" – from Inédito (2011) – Spanish version, feat. Ivano Fossati
	"Tu che m'hai preso il cuor" (live, Luciano Pavarotti feat. Laura Pausini)	1999	Pavarotti & Friends for Guatemala and Kosovo	Franz Lehár	
	"Tu cosa sogni?"	1998	La mia risposta	Cheope, Giuseppe Tosetto	"¿Tu con qué sueñas?" – from Mi respuesta (1998) – Spanish version
	"Tutt'al più"	1993	Laura Pausini	Angelo Valsiglio, Pietro Cremonesi, Roberto Casini	"¿Por qué no?" – from Laura Pausini (1994) – Spanish version
	"Tutto non fa te"	2011	Inedito	Laura Pausini, Niccolò Agliardi, Simone Bertolotti, Luca Chiaravalli	"Lo que tú me das" – from Inédito (2011) – Spanish version
	"Un amico è così"	1994	Laura	Cheope, Marco Marati, Angelo Valsiglio, Roberto Buti	"Un amico è così" – from Live in Paris 05 (2005) – included in a medley, live in Paris
†	"Un fatto ovvio"	2008	Primavera in anticipo	Laura Pausini, Cheope, Daniel Vuletic	"Un hecho obvio" – from Primavera anticipada (2008) – Spanish version
	"Un giorno dove vivere"	2008	Primavera in anticipo*	Laura Pausini, Niccolò Agliardi, Paolo Carta	"Un tiempo en el que vivir" – from Primavera anticipada (2008) – Spanish version
	"Un giorno senza te"	1996	Le cose che vivi	Cheope, Roberto Buti	"Un día sin ti" – from Las cosas que vives (1996) – Spanish version
	"Un progetto di vita in comune"	2018	Fatti sentire	Laura Pausini, Cheope, Daniel Vuletic	"Un proyecto de vida en común" – from Hazte sentir (2018) – Spanish version
†	"Un'emergenza d'amore"	1998	La mia risposta	Laura Pausini, Cheope, Massimo Pacciani, Eric Buffat	"Emergencia de amor" – from Mi respuesta (1998) – Spanish version; "Un'emergenza d'amore" – from Live 2001–2002 (2002) – live in Milan; "Un'emergenza d'amore" – from Live in Paris 05 (2005) – live in Paris; "Un'emergenza d'amore" – from San Siro 2007 (2007) – live in Milan; "Un'emergenza d'amore" – from Laura Live (2009) – live in Verona; "Emergencia de amor" – from Laura Live (2009) – live in Lima; "Un'emergenza d'amore" – from 20 – The Greatest Hits (2013) – live in New York
†	"Una storia che vale"	2001	The Best of Laura Pausini: E ritorno da te	Laura Pausini, Cheope, Daniel	"Dos historias iguales" – from L mejor de Laura Pausini: Volveré junto a ti – Spanish version; "Una storia che vale" – from Live 2001–2002 (2002) – live in Milan; "Una storia che vale" – from San Siro 2007 (2007) – live in Milan
	"Una storia seria"	1998	La mia risposta	Laura Pausini, Cheope, Salvatore Mauro Ragusa	"Una historia seria" – from Mi respuesta (1998) – Spanish version
	"Viaggio con te"	2000	Tra te e il mare	Fabrizio Pausini, Emanuela Cortesi, Giuseppe Dati, Cheope, Antonio Galbiati	"La meta de mi viaje" – from Entre tú y mil mares (2000) – Spanish version
	"Vitti na crozza" (live in Palermo)	2009	Laura Live World Tour 09	Traditional song	
†	"Vivere (Dare to Live)" (Andrea Bocelli feat. Laura Pausini)	2007	The Best of Andrea Bocelli: Vivere	Gerardina Trovato, Angelo Anastasio, Celso Valli	"Vive ya (Dare to Live)" – from Lo mejor de Andrea Bocelli: Vivire (2007) – Spanish-English version, with Andrea Bocelli; "Vivere (Dare to Live)" – from The Tribute to Pavarotti – One Amazing Weekend in Petra (2009) – live in Petra, with Andrea Bocelli
†	"Vivimi"	2004	Resta in ascolto	Biagio Antonacci	"Víveme" – from Escucha (2004) – Spanish version; "Vivimi" – from Live in Paris 05 (2005) – live in Paris; "Víveme" – from Live in Paris 05 (2005) – unplugged in Los Angeles; "Vivimi/Víveme" – from San Siro 2007 (2007) – Italian-Spanish version, live in Milan; "Vivimi" – from Laura Live (2009) – live in Bergamo; "Víveme" – from Laura Live (2009) – live in Barcelona; "Vivimi/Víveme" – from 20 – The Greatest Hits (2013) – Italian-Spanish version, with Alejandro Sanz; "Víveme" – from 20 – Grandes éxitos (2013) – with Alejandro Sanz; "Vivimi" – from Palco Antonacci – San Siro 2014 – L'amore comporta (2014) – live in Milan, with Biagio Antonacci
†	"Volevo dirti che ti amo"	2000	Tra te e il mare	Laura Pausini, Giuseppe Dati, Cheope, Eric Buffat	"Quiero decirte que te amo" – from Entre tú y mil mares (2000) – Spanish version
	"We Are the World" (live, Luciano Pavarotti & Friends)	1999	Pavarotti & Friends for Guatemala and Kosovo	Michael Jackson, Lionel Richie	
	"White Christmas"	2016	Laura Xmas	Irving Berlin	"Blanca Navidad" – from Laura Navidad (2016) – Spanish version; "Noël blanc" – from Laura Xmas* (2016) – French version
	"Without You"	2002	From the Inside	K. C. Porter, Eric Buffat, Arnie Roman	
†	"Y, ¿si fuera ella?" (Alejandro Sanz feat. Pablo Alborán, David Bisbal, Antonio Carmona, Manuel Carrasco, Jesse & Joy, Juanes, Pablo López, Malú, Vanesa Martín, India Martínez, Antonio Orozco, Niña Pastori, Laura Pausini, Abel Pintos, Rozalén, Shakira and Tommy Torres)	2017	Non-album track	Alejandro Sanz	
	"You Are"	2002	From the Inside	Peter Bertilsson, Andreas Aleman	
†	"You'll Never Find Another Love Like Mine" (live) (Michael Bublé feat. Laura Pausini)	2005	Caught in the Act	Kenny Gamble, Leon Huff	"You'll Never Find Another Love Like Mine" – from 20 – The Greatest Hits (2013) – live
	"Zona d'ombra"	2018	Fatti sentire	Laura Pausini, Niccolò Agliardi, Joseph Carta	"El caso está perdido" – from Hazte sentir (2018) – Spanish version

== Unreleased and rare songs ==
- Beautiful (10-second snippet English version of Nel primo sguardo)
- For your love (Sonámbula)
- Harmony in love
- Kiss Kiss
- La solitudine (Neapolitan version)
- Radiant (English version of Limpido)
- Si sta così

== See also ==
- Laura Pausini discography

== Notes ==
- A An asterisk beside an album title denotes the song to be available as a bonus track on certain editions of said album.
- B Songwriters are adapted from the Italian Society of Authors and Publishers database, except where noted.
- C The track is a medley including the following songs:
  - "Disco Inferno" (Leroy Green, Ron Kersey)
  - "Never Can Say Goodbye" (Clifton Davis)
  - "Celebration" (Ronald Nathan Bell, Claydes Charles Smith. George Melvin Brown. James "J.T." Taylor, Robert Spike Mickens, Earl Eugene Toon Jr., Dennis Ronald Thomas, Robert Earl Bell, Eumir Deodato)
  - "Relight My Fire" (Dan Hartman)
  - "Don't Let Me Be Misunderstood" (Bennie Benjamin, Gloria Caldwell, Sol Marcus)
  - "Le Freak" (Bernard Edwards, Nile Rodgers)
  - "We Are Family" (Bernard Edwards, Nile Rodgers)
  - "Girls Just Want to Have Fun" (Robert Hazard)
  - "Self Control" (Giancarlo Bigazzi, Raffaele Riefoli, Steve Piccolo)
  - "Tarzan Boy" (Maurizio Bassi, Naimy Hackett)
  - "In alto mare" (Oscar Avogadro, Daniele Pace, Mario Lavezzi)
  - "Crying at the Discoteque" (Alexander Bard, Anders Hansson, Anders Wollbeck, Bernard Edwards, Michael Goulos, Nile Rodgers)
  - "Venus" (Robbie van Leeuwen)
  - "Hot Stuff" (Pete Bellotte, Harold Faltermeyer, Keith Forsey)
  - "What Is Love" (Dee Dee Halligan, Junior Torello)
  - "The Rhythm of the Night" (Giorgio Spagna, Francesco Bontempi, Annerley Gordon, Peter Glenister, Mike Gaffey)
  - "Rumore" (Andrea Lo Vecchio, Guido Maria Ferilli)
  - "Born to Be Alive" (Patrick Hernandez)
  - "Walk Like an Egyptian" (Liam Sternberg)
  - "You're the One That I Want" (John Farrar)
  - "Y.M.C.A." (Henri Belolo, Jacques Morali, Victor Willis)
