= The Best of Laura Pausini: E ritorno da te =

The Best of… E ritorno da te/Lo mejor de… Volveré junto a ti
- Italian-language edition

Compilation album by Laura Pausini
- Released: October 8, 2001
- Genres: Latin pop; pop rock
- Length: 66:34
- Languages: Italian, Spanish, Portuguese, English
- Label: CGD East West
- Producers: Laura Pausini, Alfredo Cerruti, Gabriele Parisi

Laura Pausini chronology
Tra te e il mare/Entre tú y mil mares (2000)	The Best of… E ritorno da te/Lo mejor de… Volveré junto a ti (2001)	Live 2001–2002 World Tour (2001)

Alternative cover
- Spanish-language edition

Singles from The Best of… E ritorno da te/Lo mejor de… Volveré junto a ti
- 1. "E ritorno da te/Volveré junto a ti" Released: September 14, 2001; 2. "Una storia che vale/Dos historias iguales" Released: February 1, 2002; 3. "Dime" Released: 2002

Professional ratings
Review scores
Source	Rating
AllMusic	4/5 stars

The Best of Laura Pausini: E ritorno da te and Lo mejor de Laura Pausini: Volveré junto a ti (English: The Best of Laura Pausini: And Back to You) are the greatest hits albums of Italian singer Laura Pausini, released on October 8, 2001, by CGD East West (Warner) Records.

In addition to its collected tracks (between which are included new versions of her first hits), the album features four new tracks "E ritorno da te" (Spanish: "Volveré junto a ti"), "Una storia che vale" (Spanish: "Dos historias iguales"), "One More Time" (originally recorded in 1999) and "Dime" (included only on the Spanish edition). Between October 2001 and June 2002, Pausini held the 2001/2002 World Tour, to support and promote the album worldwide, this is another hit for Laura because the album it has managed to sell over 10 million copies worldwide.

The track "One More Time" was originally present on the soundtrack of the 1999 motion picture "Message in a Bottle", where it played during the credits. The song "Speranza", only present at the Platinum edition of the album, was the theme song of the Brazilian soap opera "Esperança", which was broadcast from June 2002 to February 2003.

== Track listing ==
=== The Best of Laura Pausini: E ritorno da te ===
No.	Title	Lyrics	Music	Album	Length
1.	"E ritorno da te"	Laura Pausini, Cheope	Daniel	New song	4:01
2.	"La solitudine" (2001 version)	Federico Cavalli, Cremonesi	Angelo Valsiglio, Pietro Cremonesi	Laura Pausini (1993)	4:24
3.	"Non c'è" (2001 version)	Cavalli, Cremonesi	Valsiglio, Cremonesi	Laura Pausini (1993)	4:16
4.	"Strani amori" (2001 version)	Cheope, Marco Marati, Francesco Tanini	Valsiglio, Roberto Buti	Laura (1994)	4:17
5.	"Gente (Ordinary People)" (2001 version)	Cheope, Marati	Valsiglio	Laura (1994)	4:37
6.	"Incancellabile"	Cheope	Giuseppe Carella, Fabrizio Baldoni, Gino de Stefani	Le cose che vivi (1996)	3:50
7.	"Le cose che vivi"	Cheope, Fabrizio Pausini	Carella, Baldoni, de Stefani	Le cose che vivi (1996)	4:31
8.	"Seamisai (Sei que me amavas)" (Duet with Gilberto Gil)	Cheope, Gilberto Gil	Carella	Le cose che vivi (1996)	3:40
9.	"Ascolta il tuo cuore"	Cheope, F. Pausini	Vito Mastrofrancesco, Alberto Mastrofrancesco, Charles Cohiba	Le cose che vivi (1996)	4:40
10.	"Mi respuesta"	L. Pausini, Cheope, Badia	Claudio Guidetti	Mi respuesta (1998)	3:43
11.	"In assenza di te"	L. Pausini, Cheope	Antonio Galbiati	La mia risposta (1998)	4:29
12.	"Un'emergenza d'amore"	L. Pausini, Cheope, Massimo Pacciani	Eric Buffat	La mia risposta (1998)	4:34
13.	"One More Time"	Richard Marx	Marx	Message in a Bottle: Music from and Inspired by the Motion Picture (1999)	4:22
14.	"Tra te e il mare"	Biagio Antonacci	Antonacci	Tra te e il mare (2000)	3:49
15.	"Every Day is a Monday"	L. Pausini, Giuseppe Dati, Cheope	Andreas Carlsson, Alistair Thomson	Tra te e il mare (2000)	3:06
16.	"Una storia che vale"	L. Pausini, Cheope	Daniel	New song	4:15

Platinum edition bonus track
No.	Title	Writer(s)	Italian adaptation	Length
17.	"Speranza" (Theme from the telenovela Esperança)	Marcelo Tranquilli Barbosa, Luiz Schiavon, Nil Bernardes	Laura Pausini	3:49

=== Lo mejor de Laura Pausini: Volveré junto a ti ===
No.	Title	Lyrics	Music	Album	Length
1.	"Volveré junto a ti"	Laura Pausini, Cheope, Badia	Daniel	New song	4:01
2.	"La soledad" (2001 version)	Federico Cavalli, Cremonesi, Badia	Angelo Valsiglio, Pietro Cremonesi	Laura Pausini (1994)	4:24
3.	"Se fue" (2001 version)	Cavalli, Cremonesi, Badia	Valsiglio, Cremonesi	Laura Pausini (1994)	4:16
4.	"Amores extraños" (2001 version)	Cheope, Marco Marati, Francesco Tanini, Badia	Valsiglio, Roberto Buti	Laura Pausini (1994)	4:17
5.	"Gente (Ordinary People)" (2001 version)	Cheope, Marati, Badia	Valsiglio	Laura Pausini (1994)	4:37
6.	"Inolvidable"	Cheope, Badia	Giuseppe Carella, Fabrizio Baldoni, Gino de Stefani	Las cosas que vives (1996)	3:50
7.	"Las cosas que vives"	Cheope, Fabrizio Pausini, Badia	Carella, Baldoni, de Stefani	Las cosas que vives (1996)	4:31
8.	"Cuando se ama (Sei que me amavas)" (Duet with Gilberto Gil)	Cheope, Badia, Gilberto Gil	Carella	Las cosas que vives (1996)	3:40
9.	"Escucha a tu corazón"	Cheope, F. Pausini, Badia	Vito Mastrofrancesco, Alberto Mastrofrancesco, Charles Cohiba	Las cosas que vives (1996)	4:40
10.	"La mia risposta"	L. Pausini, Cheope	Claudio Guidetti	La mia risposta (1998)	3:43
11.	"En ausencia de ti"	L. Pausini, Cheope, Badia	Antonio Galbiati	Mi respuesta (1998)	4:29
12.	"Emergencia de amor"	L. Pausini, Cheope, Massimo Pacciani, Carlos Pixin, León Tristán	Eric Buffat	Mi respuesta (1998)	4:34
13.	"One More Time"	Richard Marx	Marx	Message in a Bottle: Music from and Inspired by the Motion Picture (1999)	4:22
14.	"Entre tú y mil mares"	Biagio Antonacci, Badia	Antonacci	Entre tú y mil mares (2000)	3:50
15.	"Un error de los grandes"	L. Pausini, Giuseppe Dati, Cheope, Badia	Andreas Carlsson, Alistair Thomson	Entre tú y mil mares (2000)	3:06
16.	"Dos historias iguales"	L. Pausini, Cheope, Badia	Daniel	New song	4:13
17.	"Dime" (Duet with José el Francés)	José Rodríquez Vázquez	Vázquez	New song	3:37

== Charts ==
=== Weekly charts ===
Chart (2001–2010)	Peak position
Belgian Albums (Ultratop Flanders)	40
Belgian Albums (Ultratop Wallonia)	9
Brazilian Albums (ABPD)	17
Croatian International Albums (HDU)	19
Dutch Albums (Album Top 100)	28
Finnish Albums (Suomen virallinen lista)	6
French Albums (SNEP)	2
German Albums (Offizielle Top 100)	44
Italian Albums (FIMI)	1
Spanish Albums (Promusicae)	6
Swedish Albums (Sverigetopplistan)	27
Swiss Albums (Schweizer Hitparade)	3
US Latin Pop Albums (Billboard)	9
US Top Latin Albums (Billboard)	4

=== Year-end charts ===
Chart (2001)	Position
French Compilations (SNEP)	36
Italian Albums (FIMI)	5
Swiss Albums (Schweizer Hitparade)	30

Chart (2002)	Position
French Compilations (SNEP)	4
Italian Albums (FIMI)	8
Swiss Albums (Schweizer Hitparade)	24
US Latin Pop Albums (Billboard)	13

Chart (2003)	Position
French Compilations (SNEP)	3

Chart (2005)	Position
Italian Albums (FIMI)	90

Chart (2006)	Position
Italian Albums (FIMI)	90

== Certifications and sales ==
Region	Certification	Certified units/sales
Argentina (CAPIF)	Platinum	40,000^{^}
Belgium (BRMA)	Gold	25,000^{*}
Brazil (Pro-Música Brasil)	Platinum	125,000^{*}
Finland (Musiikkituottajat)	Platinum	33,027
France (SNEP)	2× Platinum	800,000
Italy sales as of 2004	—	700,000
Italy (FIMI) sales since 2009	Platinum	100,000^{*}
Mexico (AMPROFON)	Gold	75,000^{^}
Spain (Promusicae)	Platinum	100,000^{^}
Switzerland (IFPI Switzerland)	2× Platinum	80,000^{^}
United States (RIAA)	Platinum (Latin)	100,000^{^}
Summaries
Europe (IFPI)	Platinum	1,000,000^{*}
^{*} Sales figures based on certification alone.^{^} Shipments figures based on certification alone.
