= Laura Live World Tour 09 =

Laura Live World Tour 09/Laura Live Gira Mundial 09
- Italian-language edition

Live album by Laura Pausini
- Released: November 27, 2009
- Recorded: Italy (12 locations), Brazil, Chile, Dominican Republic, Finland, Malta, Mexico, Spain (2 locations), Switzerland (2 locations), United States (3 locations)
- Genre: Pop rock
- Length: 3:39:53
- Language: Italian; Spanish
- Label: Atlantic
- Producer: Laura Pausini; Gabriele Parisi

Laura Pausini chronology
Primavera in anticipo/Primavera anticipada (2008)	Laura Live World Tour 09/Laura Live Gira Mundial 09 (2009)	Inedito/Inédito (2011)

Singles from Laura Live World Tour 09/Laura Live Gira Mundial 09
- 1. "Con la musica alla radio" Released: September 25, 2009; 2. "Non sono lei" Released: November 20, 2009; 3. "Casomai" Released: January 29, 2010

Laura Live World Tour 09 and Laura Live Gira Mundial 09 are the third live albums by Italian singer Laura Pausini, released on November 27, 2009 by Warner Music. It was recorded in different countries during her World Tour 2009. The Spanish-language edition is Pausini’s first live album in Spanish as her first 2 live albums were in Italian.

== Album information ==
Laura Live was anticipated by the release of Laura Pausini's single Con la musica alla radio on September 25, 2009.

The CD version contains 18 tracks, where 15 of them were recorded on tour in different cities around the world. There are also 3 unpublished tracks which includes, Con la musica alla radio, Non sono lei and Casomai which was recorded live during a soundcheck in the Brazilian city of São Paulo. The DVD version of the album contains videos from concerts from the World Tour 2009, which includes 3 new videos and songs.

The Italian version of the CD was recorded in: Barletta, Bergamo, Cagliari, Florence, Milan, Monza, Naples, Palermo, Rome, Teramo, Turin, Verona, Barcelona, Brussels, Paris, Helsinki, Locarno, Malta, New York City and São Paulo.

The Spanish version of the CD was recorded in: Bergamo, Cagliari, Monza, Naples, Palermo, Rome, Turin, Verona, Barcelona, Mexico City, Paris, Helsinki, Hollywood, Florida, Los Angeles, Lima, Locarno, Madrid, New York City, São Paulo, Santiago and Santo Domingo

== Track listing ==
=== Laura Live World Tour 2009 ===
==== Disc 1 (CD) ====
No.	Title	Writer(s)	Recorded	Length
1.	"Intro – It's Too Late" (Live)	Laura Pausini, Paolo Carta, Bruno Zucchetti	Helsinki, 20 May 2009	0:45
2.	"Invece no" (Live)	L. Pausini, Niccolò Agliardi, Carta	Milan, 14 April 2009	3:57
3.	"Come se non fosse stato mai amore" (Live)	L. Pausini, Cheope, Daniel Vuletic	Florence, 11 March 2009	4:07
4.	"Un'emergenza d'amore" (Live)	L. Pausini, Cheope, Massimo Pacciani, Eric Buffat	Verona, 29 June 2009	6:04
5.	"E ritorno da te" (Live)	L. Pausini, Cheope, Vuletic	Barletta, 16 July 2009	4:22
6.	"La geografia del mio cammino" (Live)	L. Pausini, Cheope, Agliardi, Carta	Teramo, 14 July 2009	4:51
7.	"Vivimi" (Live)	Biagio Antonacci	Bergamo, 9 July 2009	4:39
8.	"Le cose che vivi" (Live)	Cheope, Fabrizio Pausini, Giuseppe Carella, Fabrizio Baldoni, Gino de Stefani	Palermo, 18 July 2009	4:39
9.	"Tra te e il mare" (Live)	Antonacci	Rome, 15 March 2009	4:13
10.	"Io canto" (Live)	Riccardo Cocciante, Marco Luberti	Malta, 21 July 2009	4:13
11.	"E poi" (Live)	Giorgia Todrani, Marco Rinalduzzi, Massimo Calabrese	Rome, 16 March 2009	2:11
12.	"Resta in ascolto" (Live)	L. Pausini, Cheope, Vuletic	Brussels, 25 May 2009	3:55
13.	"La mia banda suona il rock" (Live)	Ivano Fossati	Cagliari, 25 July 2009	4:10
14.	"La solitudine" (Live)	Federico Cavalli, Angelo Valsiglio, Pietro Cremonesi	Naples, 11 July 2009	4:37
15.	"Primavera in anticipo (It Is My Song)" (Live)	L. Pausini, Cheope, James Blunt, Vuletic	Monza, 3 July 2009	5:21
16.	"Con la musica alla radio" (New song)	L. Pausini, Cheope, Vuletic	Studio version	3:43
17.	"Non sono lei" (New song)	L. Pausini, Cheope, Vuletic	Studio version	3:40
18.	"Casomai" (New song, soundcheck live)	L. Pausini, Cheope, Vuletic	Soundcheck in São Paulo, 6 October 2009	3:18

==== Disc 2 (DVD) ====
No.	Title	Writer(s)	Recorded	Length
1.	"Intro – It's Too Late" (Video live)	L. Pausini, Carta, Zucchetti	Helsinki, 20 May 2009	1:46
2.	"Invece no" (Video live)	L. Pausini, Agliardi, Carta	Milan, 14 April 2009	3:56
3.	"Come se non fosse stato mai amore" (Video live)	L. Pausini, Cheope, Vuletic	Florence, 11 March 2009	4:11
4.	"Medley Rock: Spaccacuore / Benedetta passione / La prospettiva di me / Parlami / Il mio beneficio" (Video live)	Bersani, d'Onghia, Dalla / Rossi, Curreri, Grandi / L. Pausini, Cheope, Vuletic	Locarno, 8 July 2009	8:20
5.	"Un'emergenza d'amore" (Video live)	L. Pausini, Cheope, Massimo Pacciani, Eric Buffat	Verona, 29 June 2009	6:07
6.	"Viveme" (Video live)	Antonacci, L. Pausini, Badia	Barcelona, 30 April 2009	4:33
7.	"Mille braccia" (Video live)	L. Pausini, Cheope, Carta	Naples, 11 July 2009	3:51
8.	"E ritorno da te" (Video live)	L. Pausini, Cheope, Vuletic	Barletta, 16 July 2009	4:26
9.	"La geografia del mio cammino" (Video live)	L. Pausini, Cheope, Agliardi, Carta	Teramo, 14 July 2009	4:47
10.	"Medley Pop: Dove sei / Somos hoy / Un error de los grandes / Gente / Bellísimo así" (Video live)	Cavalli, Cremonesi, Valsiglio / L. Pausini, Cheope, Dati, Carlsson, Thomson, Badia / Cheope, Marco Marati, Valsiglio / L. Pausini, Cheope, Federica Fratoni, Daniele Coro, Jorge Ballesteros	Barcelona, 30 April 2009	9:15
11.	"Sorella terra" (Video live)	L. Pausini, Cheope, Vuletic	Turin, 5 March 2009	6:14
12.	"Io canto" (Video live)	Cocciante, Luberti	Malta, 21 July 2009	4:03
13.	"Tra te e il mare" (Video live)	Antonacci	Rome, 15 March 2009	4:27
14.	"Le cose che vivi" (Video live)	Cheope, F. Pausini, Carella, Baldoni, de Stefani	Palermo, 18 July 2009	4:37
15.	"Medley Soft: Il tuo nome in maiuscolo / Nel modo più sincero che c'è / Surrender / Due innamorati come noi / Prima che esci (duet with Gianluca Grignani) / In assenza di te / Incancellabile" (Video live)	L. Pausini, Cheope, Vuletic / L. Pausini, Cheope, Vuletic / de Viller, Hosein, Smith, Anderson / Cheope, Buti, Capaccioli / Grignani / L. Pausini, Cheope, Galbiati / Cheope, Carella, Baldoni, de Stefani	Bergamo, 9 July 2009	14:48
16.	"La mia banda suona il rock" (Video live)	Fossati	Cagliari, 25 July 2009	4:06
17.	"Amores extraños" (Video live)	Cheope, Buti, Marati, Valsiglio, Francesco Tanini, Badia	New York, 16 October 2009	4:16
18.	"Primavera in anticipo (It Is My Song)" (Video live)	L. Pausini, Cheope, Blunt, Vuletic	Monza, 3 July 2009	5:02

DVD Special Features
No.	Title	Writer(s)	Recorded	Length
1.	"Con la musica alla radio" (New song, videoclip)	L. Pausini, Cheope, Vuletic	—	4:12
2.	"Non sono lei" (New song, videoclip)	L. Pausini, Cheope, Vuletic	—	4:03
3.	"Casomai" (Soundcheck live, videoclip)	L. Pausini, Cheope, Vuletic	—	3:39
4.	"Un fatto ovvio" (Videoclip)	L. Pausini, Cheope, Vuletic	—	4:41
5.	"Behind the scenes Live Tour 09"	—	—	10:58
6.	"Con la musica alla radio" (Making of the video)	L. Pausini, Cheope, Vuletic	—	3:43
7.	"Non sono lei" (Making of the video)	L. Pausini, Cheope, Vuletic	—	3:42
8.	"E poi" (Video live)	Giorgia, Rinalduzzi, Calabrese	Rome, 16 March 2009	2:21
9.	"Paris au mois d'aout" (Video live, in duet with Fabrizio Pausini)	Aznavour, Garvarentz	Paris, 12 May 2009	2:16
10.	"Napule è" (Video live)	Daniele	Naples, 11 July 2009	1:01
11.	"Vitti 'na crozza" (Video live)	Franco Li Causi	Palermo, 18 July 2009	2:23
12.	"Heal the World" (Video live)	Jackson	Palermo, 18 July 2009	2:19

=== Laura Live Gira Mundial 09 ===
==== Disc 1 (CD) ====
No.	Title	Writer(s)	Recorded	Length
1.	"Intro – It's Too Late" (Live)	Laura Pausini, Carta, Zucchetti	Helsinki, 20 May 2009	0:45
2.	"En cambio no" (Live)	L. Pausini, Agliardi, Carta, Jorge Ballesteros	Madrid, 28 April 2009	4:05
3.	"Como si no nos hubiéramos amado" (Live)	L. Pausini, Cheope, Vuletic, León Tristán	Barcelona, 30 April 2009	4:01
4.	"Medley Rock: Dispárame dispara / Bendecida pasión / Mi perspectiva / Háblame / Mis beneficios" (Video live)	Bersani, d'Onghia, Dalla, L. Pausini, Ortiz / Rossi, Curreri, Grandi, L. Pausini / L. Pausini, Cheope, Vuletic, Badia / L. Pausini, Cheope, Vuletic, León Tristán / L. Pausini, Cheope, Vuletic, J. Ballesteros	Los Angeles, 24 September 2009	8:17
5.	"Amores extraños" (Live)	Cheope, Buti, Marati, Valsiglio, Tanini, Badia	New York, 16 October 2009	4:20
6.	"Emergencia de amor" (Live)	L. Pausini, Cheope, Pacciani, Buffat, Carlos Pixin, León Tristán	Lima, 27 September 2009	6:06
7.	"Víveme" (Live)	Antonacci, L. Pausini, Badia	Barcelona, 30 April 2009	4:47
8.	"Entre tú y mil mares" (Live)	Antonacci, Badia	Madrid, 28 April 2009	4:18
9.	"Volveré junto a ti" (Live)	L. Pausini, Cheope, Vuletic, Badia	Santiago, 30 September 2009	4:22
10.	"Escucha atento" (Live)	L. Pausini, Cheope, Vuletic, Badia	Barcelona, 30 April 2009	3:57
11.	"Yo canto" (Live)	Cocciante, Luberti, Frank Andrada	Mexico City, 10 October 2009	4:22
12.	"Se fue" (Live)	Cavalli, Cremonesi, Valsiglio, Badia	Hollywood, 14 October 2009	4:27
13.	"Primavera anticipada (It Is My Song)" (Live)	L. Pausini, Cheope, James Blunt, Vuletic, Ignacio Ballesteros	Santo Domingo, 19 September 2009	3:39
14.	"La soledad" (Live)	Cavalli, Cremonesi, Valsiglio, Badia	Barcelona, 30 April 2009	5:06
15.	"Con la musica en la radio" (New song)	L. Pausini, Cheope, I. Ballesteros, Vuletic	—	3:43
16.	"Ella no soy" (New song)	L. Pausini, Cheope, I. Ballesteros, Vuletic	—	3:40
17.	"Menos mal" (Soundcheck live)	L. Pausini, Cheope, I. Ballesteros, Vuletic	Soundcheck in São Paulo, 6 October 2009	3:18

==== Disc 2 (DVD) ====
No.	Title	Writer(s)	Recorded	Length
1.	"Intro – It's Too Late" (Video live)	L. Pausini, Carta, Zucchetti	Helsinki, 20 May 2009	1:46
2.	"En cambio no" (Video live)	L. Pausini, Agliardi, Carta, Jorge Ballesteros	Madrid, 28 April 2009
3.	"Como si no nos hubiéramos amado" (Video live)	L. Pausini, Cheope, Vuletic, León Tristán	Barcelona, 30 April 2009
4.	"Medley Pop: Dove sei / Somos hoy / Un error de los grandes / Gente / Bellísimo así" (Video live)	Cavalli, Cremonesi, Valsiglio / L. Pausini, Dati, Cheope, Buffat, Badia / L. Pausini, Dati, Cheope, A. Carlsson, A. Thomson, Badia / Valsiglio, Cheope, Marati, Badia / L. Pausini, Cheope, Fratoni, Coro, J. Ballesteros	Barcelona, 30 April 2009	9:15
5.	"Víveme" (Video live)	Biagio Antonacci, L. Pausini, Badia	Barcelona, 30 April 2009
6.	"Volveré junto a ti" (Video live)	L. Pausini, Cheope, Vuletic, Badia	Santiago, 30 September 2009
7.	"Entre tú y mil mares" (Video live)	Antonacci, Badia	Madrid, 28 April 2009
8.	"Escucha atento" (Video live)	L. Pausini, Cheope, Vuletic, Badia	Barcelona, 40 April 2009
9.	"Amores extraños" (Video live)	Cheope, Buti, Marati, Tanini, Valsiglio, Badia	New York, 16 October 2009
10.	"Se fue" (Video live)	Cremonesi, Cavalli, Valsiglio, Badia	Hollywood, 14 October 2009
11.	"Mille braccia" (Video live)	L. Pausini, Cheope, Carta	Naples, 11 July 2009	3:51
12.	"Medley Rock: Spaccacuore / Benedetta passione / La prospettiva di me / Parlami" (Video live)	Bersani, d'Onghia, Dalla / Rossi, Curreri, Grandi / L. Pausini, Cheope, Vuletic / L. Pausini, Cheope, Vuletic	Locarno, 8 July 2009	8:20
13.	"Il mio beneficio" (Video live)	L. Pausini, Cheope, Vuletic	Locarno, 8 July 2009
14.	"Un'emergenza d'amore" (Video live)	L. Pausini, Cheope, Pacciani, Buffat	Verona, 29 June 2009	6:07
15.	"Sorella terra" (Video live)	L. Pausini, Cheope, Vuletic	Turin, 5 March 2009	6:14
16.	"La mia banda suona il rock" (Video live)	Fossati	Cagliari, 25 July 2009	4:06
17.	"Medley Soft: Il tuo nome in maiuscolo / Nel modo più sincero che c'è / Surrender / Due innamorati come noi / Prima che esci (Duet with Gianluca Grignani) / In assenza di te / Incancellabile" (Video live)	L. Pausini, Cheope, Vuletic / L. Pausini, Cheope, Vuletic / de Viller, Hosein, Smith, Anderson / Cheope, Buti, Capaccioli / Grignani / L. Pausini, Cheope, Galbiati / Cheope, Carella, Baldoni, de Stefani	Bergamo, 9 July 2009	14:48
18.	"Primavera in anticipo (It Is My Song)" (Video live)	L. Pausini, Cheope, Blunt, Vuletic	Monza, 3 July 2009	5:02

DVD Special Features
No.	Title	Writer(s)	Recorded	Length
1.	"Con la musica en la radio" (New song, videoclip)	L. Pausini, Cheope, I. Ballesteros, Vuletic	—	4:12
2.	"Ella no soy" (New song, videoclip)	L. Pausini, Cheope, I. Ballesteros, Vuletic	—	4:03
3.	"Menos mal" (New song, videoclip recorded during a live soundcheck)	L. Pausini, Cheope, I. Ballesteros, Vuletic	Buenos Aires, 2 October 2009	3:39
4.	"Un hecho obvio" (Videoclip)	L. Pausini, Cheope, J. Ballesteros, Vuletic	—	4:41
5.	"Detras de escenas Live Tour 09"	—	—	10:58
6.	"Con la música en la radio" (Making of the video)	L. Pausini, Cheope, I. Ballesteros, Vuletic	—	3:43
7.	"Ella no soy" (Making of the video)	L. Pausini, Cheope, I. Ballesteros, Vuletic	—	3:42
8.	"E poi" (Video live)	Giorgia Todrani, Rinalduzzi, Calabrese	Rome, 16 March 2009	2:21
9.	"Paris au mois d'aout" (Video live, in duet with Fabrizio Pausini)	Aznavour, Garvarentz	Paris, 12 May 2009	2:16
10.	"Napule è" (Video live)	Daniele	Naples, 11 July 2009	1:01
11.	"Vitti 'na crozza" (Video live)	Franco Li Causi	Palermo, 18 July 2009	2:23
12.	"Heal The World" (Video live)	Jackson	Palermo, 18 July 2009	2:19

== Charts ==
=== Weekly charts ===
Chart (2009–2010)	Peak position
Belgian Albums (Ultratop Wallonia)	53
European Top 100 Albums (Billboard)	30
French Albums (SNEP)	91
Italian Albums (FIMI)	2
Mexican Albums (AMPROFON)	24
Spanish Albums (PROMUSICAE)	32
Swiss Albums (Schweizer Hitparade)	14
US Latin Pop Albums (Billboard)	9
US Top Latin Albums (Billboard)	33

=== Year-end charts ===
Chart (2010)	Position
Italian Albums (FIMI)	27

== Certifications and sales ==
Region	Certification	Certified units/sales
Italy (FIMI)	4× Platinum	240,000^{*}
^{*} Sales figures based on certification alone.
