= Looking for an Angel =

Looking for an Angel may refer to:

- "Looking for an Angel", Phil Collins song, performed by Laura Pausini on La mia risposta
- "Looking for an Angel", song by Kylie Minogue from the album Aphrodite
