= Una storia che vale =

Single by Laura Pausini

from the album The Best of Laura Pausini: E ritorno da te
- Released: February 1, 2002
- Recorded: 2001 • Logic Studio; Milan • Capri Studio; Capri
- Genre: Pop, latin pop
- Length: 4:13
- Label: CGD
- Songwriters: Laura Pausini and Cheope
- Producers: Laura Pausini, Alfredo Cerruti and Dado Parisini

Laura Pausini singles chronology
"E ritorno da te" (2001)	"Una storia che vale" (2002)	"La solitudine (new version)" (2002)

Music video
- "Una storia che vale" on YouTube

"Una storia che vale" (A worthwhile story) is a song by Italian recording artist Laura Pausini, released in February 2002 as the second single from her first compilation album, The Best of Laura Pausini: E ritorno da te. Pausini also released a Spanish-language version of the song, titled "Dos historias iguales" (Two equal stories). This version was inserted on the album Lo mejor de Laura Pausini: Volveré junto a ti and was released as the album's second single in Spain and Latin America. The Italian version was released as the last single from the album.

Both versions were transmitted on the radio, with two videoclips being recorded and released.

During the promotion of Pausini's 2003 English language album, a list of the songs that would be present on that album was leaked. An English version of Una storia che vale, named "Can't Turn Back Time" is said to exist, but has never been released by Pausini in any album.

== The music video ==
The music video (in Italian and Spanish), was directed by Daniele Persica and shot during the night in the outskirts of Rome and during the day at one of the Leonardo da Vinci-Fiumicino Airport terminals.

The music videos of Una storia che vale and Dos historias iguales were inserted on the Live 2001-2002 World Tour, along with the Making of the video.

The video begins with Pausini at the airport, waiting for someone. As the first chorus ends, a car is shown leaving a parking lot. Pausini is shown again at the airport. Then, a cut happens and Pausini is shown once more, but now driving the car that left the parking lot before. As the song progresses, a car chase between Pausini and another driver is shown, with Pausini winning at the end and smiling at the camera.

== Track list ==
CDS - Promo 2768 Warner Music Europa

1. Una storia che vale

CDS - 0927436332 Warner Music Europa

1. Una storia che vale
2. La solitudine (Original Version)

CDS - Promo 1478 Warner Music Messico

1. Dos historias iguales
2. Una storia che vale

CDS - 1667 Warner Music USA

1. Dos historias iguales
2. Dos historias iguales (Brizz Connection Mix Radio Edit)
3. Dos historias iguales (Brizz Connection Extended Club Mix)

45 giri Promo 614 Warner Music Italia

1. Una storia che vale (Laura Pausini)
2. Nei silenzi (Raf)

Download digitale

1. Una storia che vale
2. Dos historias iguales

== Live performances ==
The only tour in which Pausini sang Una storia che vale was the 2001/2002 World Tour, and present on the DVD recorded and released of that tour.

The song was also present on the San Siro 2007 live album.

== Personnel ==
- Dado Parisini: musical keyboard, electric bass
- Riccardo Galardini: electric guitar, acoustic guitar
- Massimo Varini: electric guitar, acoustic guitar
- Gabriele Fersini: electric guitar
- Pier Foschi: batteries
- Laura Pausini: Voice
