= La mia risposta (song) =

Single by Laura Pausini

from the album La mia risposta
- Released: 1999
- Recorded: 1998
- Genre: Pop, latin pop
- Length: 3:41
- Label: CGD East West
- Songwriters: Laura Pausini, Cheope, Claudio Guidetti
- Producers: Laura Pausini, Alfredo Cerruti, Dado Parisini

Laura Pausini singles chronology
"In assenza di te" (1999)	"La mia risposta" (1999)	"One More Time" (1999)

"La mia risposta" is a song recorded by Italian singer Laura Pausini in 1998. Written by Pausini herself with Cheope and Claudio Guidetti, it was chosen as the third single from her fourth album with the same title. The song was also recorded in Spanish, under the title "Mi respuesta". This version of the song was included in her first compilation album, The Best of Laura Pausini: E ritorno da te, released in 2001, while the Italian-language version was included in the Spanish edition of the same compilation.

== Music video ==
The music video for the song, directed by Luca Lucini, was premiered during Pausini's 1999 tour and it was first broadcast by Italian music TV stations in March of the same year. The video was also included in Pausini's video album Video Collection 1993–1999, released in 1999.

== Live performances ==
Pausini performed the song during 1999's itinerant summer show Festivalbar, during the events held in Ascoli Piceno and Lignano Sabbiadoro and broadcast by Italia 1. A live version of the song was included in her first live video album, Live 2001–2002 World Tour, recorded during her 2001/2002 World Tour concert at the Mediolanum Forum on 2 December 2001 and released on 30 November 2002. "La mia risposta" was also included in a medley performed during her concert held at the Zénith de Paris in March 2005, released as a DVD under the title Live in Paris 05.

== Charts ==
Chart (2008)	Peak position
Italy (FIMI)	18
