= Tra te e il mare =

Tra te e il mare/Entre tú y mil mares
- Italian-language edition

Studio album by Laura Pausini
- Released: September 11, 2000 (Spanish-language) September 15, 2000 (Italian-language)
- Genre: Latin pop
- Length: 50:10
- Language: Italian, English, Spanish
- Label: CGD East West
- Producer: Alfredo Cerruti, Dado Parisini, Laura Pausini

Laura Pausini chronology
La mia risposta/Mi respuesta (1998)	Tra te e il mare/Entre tú y mil mares (2000)	The Best of… E ritorno da te/Lo mejor de… Volveré junto a ti (2001)

Alternative cover
- Spanish-language edition

Singles from Tra te e il mare/Entre tú y mil mares
- 1. "Tra te e il mare/Entre tú y mil mares" Released: September 2, 2000; 2. "Il mio sbaglio più grande/Un error de los grandes" Released: January 7, 2001; 3. "Quiero decirte que te amo" Released: 2001; 4. "Fidati di me/Fíate de mí" Released: June 7, 2001

Tra te e il mare and Entre tú y mil mares (English: Between You and the Sea or Between You and a Thousand Seas) are the sixth studio albums by Italian singer Laura Pausini. The Spanish-language edition was released on September 11, 2000 while the Italian-language edition was released on September 15, 2000 by CGD East West Records. As of January 2001, the album sold 400,000 copies in Italy, peaking at number 2 on the Italian Albums Chart. The album has sold 4,000,000 copies worldwide.

The Spanish-language edition was nominated for Best Female Pop Vocal Album and Best Engineered Album at the 2nd Latin Grammy Awards, while its producers were nominated for Producer of the Year.

In late 2011, a 30-second snippet of a song named "Sonambula" was leaked online, attributed to Pausini. After a controversy alleging that the song was from Pausini's then-upcoming album Inedito, Pausini confirmed that "Sonambula" was an unreleased demo from Entre tú y mil mares.

The track "Per Vivere" was written by Pausini after she went to Rio de Janeiro in early 1997 and saw many children on the street. Since the same year, Pausini makes money donations to the Romão de Matos Duarte institution.

== Track listing ==
=== Tra te e il mare ===
No.	Title	Lyrics	Music	Length
1.	"Siamo noi"	Laura Pausini, Giuseppe Dati, Cheope	Eric Buffat	3:55
2.	"Volevo dirti che ti amo"	L. Pausini, Dati, Cheope	Buffat	4:03
3.	"Il mio sbaglio più grande"	L. Pausini, Dati, Cheope	Andreas Carlsson, Alistair Thomson	3:05
4.	"Tra te e il mare"	Biagio Antonacci	Antonacci	3:49
5.	"Viaggio con te"	Fabrizio Pausini, Dati, Cheope	Antonio Galbiati, Emanuela Cortesi	3:49
6.	"Musica sarà"	L. Pausini, Dati, Cheope	Nelgrado	3:22
7.	"Anche se non-mi vuoi"	L. Pausini, Dati, Cheope	Galbiati, Federica Fratoni, L. Pausini	3:56
8.	"Fidati di me"	L. Pausini, Dati, Cheope	Giuseppe Tosetto	3:48
9.	"Ricordami"	L. Pausini, Dati, Cheope	Fabrizio Baldoni, Gino de Stefani	4:07
10.	"Per vivere"	L. Pausini, Dati, Cheope	Baldoni, de Stefani, Buffat, L. Pausini	4:04
11.	"Mentre la notte va"	L. Pausini, Dati, Cheope	Mario Lavezzi	3:29
12.	"Come si fa"	L. Pausini, Falagiani	Marco Falagiani	4:10
13.	"Jenny"	L. Pausini, Dati, Cheope	Fratoni, Sergio Vinci	4:26
14.	"The Extra Mile"	Tina Arena, Andrew Frampton, Pamela Sheyne	Tina Arena, Andrew Frampton, Pamela Sheyne	4:07

=== Entre tú y mil mares ===
No.	Title	Lyrics	Music	Spanish adaptation	Length
1.	"Somos hoy"	Laura Pausini, Giuseppe Dati, Cheope	Eric Buffat	J. Badia	3:55
2.	"Quiero decirte que te amo"	L. Pausini, Dati, Cheope	Buffat	Badia	4:03
3.	"Un error de los grandes"	L. Pausini, Dati, Cheope	Andreas Carlsson, Alistair Thomson	Badia	3:05
4.	"Entre tú y mil mares"	Antonacci	Biagio Antonacci	Badia	3:49
5.	"La meta de mi viaje"	Fabrizio Pausini, Dati, Cheope	Antonio Galbiati, Emanuela Cortesi	León Tristán	3:49
6.	"Música será"	L. Pausini, Dati, Cheope	Nelgrado	Badia	3:22
7.	"Si no me quieres hoy"	L. Pausini, Dati, Cheope	Galbiati, Federica Fratoni, L. Pausini	Badia	3:56
8.	"Fíate de mí"	L. Pausini, Dati, Cheope	Giuseppe Tosetto	Badia	3:48
9.	"Recuérdame"	L. Pausini, Dati, Cheope	Fabrizio Baldoni, Gino de Stefani	Badia	4:07
10.	"Viviré"	L. Pausini, Dati, Cheope	Baldoni, de Stefani, Buffat, L. Pausini	Badia	4:04
11.	"Mientras la noche va"	L. Pausini, Dati, Cheope	Mario Lavezzi	Badia	3:29
12.	"Cómo se hará"	L. Pausini, Falagiani	Marco Falagiani	Badia	4:10
13.	"Jenny"	L. Pausini, Dati, Cheope	Fratoni, Sergio Vinci	Badia	4:26
14.	"The Extra Mile"	Tina Arena, Andrew Frampton, Pamela Sheyne	Tina Arena, Andrew Frampton, Pamela Sheyne	——	4:07

== Charts ==
=== Weekly charts ===
Chart (2000–01)	Peak Position
Belgian Albums (Ultratop Wallonia)	38
Dutch Albums (Album Top 100)	40
Finnish Albums (Suomen virallinen lista)	4
French Albums (SNEP)	16
German Albums (Offizielle Top 100)	34
Italian Albums (FIMI)	2
Swedish Albums (Sverigetopplistan)	41
Spanish Albums (PROMUSICAE)	3
Swiss Albums (Schweizer Hitparade)	2
US Top Latin Albums (Billboard)	26
US Latin Pop Albums (Billboard)	13

=== Year-end charts ===
Chart (2000)	Position
Italian Albums (FIMI)	15
Swiss Albums Chart	14

== Certifications and sales ==
Region	Certification	Certified units/sales
Brazil	—	80,000
Finland (Musiikkituottajat)	Gold	29,059
Italy (FIMI)	4× Platinum	400,000^{*}
Mexico (AMPROFON)	Gold	105,000
Spain (Promusicae)	Platinum	100,000^{^}
Switzerland (IFPI Switzerland)	Platinum	50,000^{^}
United States (RIAA)	Platinum (Latin)	100,000^{^}
^{*} Sales figures based on certification alone.^{^} Shipments figures based on certification alone.
