= In assenza di te =

Single by Laura Pausini

from the album La mia risposta
- B-side: "Un'emergenza d'amore" (Rob's Rock Remix)
- Released: January 1999
- Recorded: 1998
- Length: 4:27
- Label: DDD; Warner M. (Italy)
- Songwriters: Laura Pausini; Cheope; Antonio Galbiati; Shelly Peiken
- Producers: Laura Pausini; Alfredo Cerruti; Dado Parisini

Laura Pausini singles chronology
"Un'emergenza d'amore" (1998)	"In assenza di te" (1999)	"La mia risposta" (1998)

Alternative covers

"In assenza di te" (English: In absence of you) is a pop song by Italian singer Laura Pausini off her fourth album, La mia risposta. "En ausencia de ti" is its Spanish-language adaptation. The song was released in France in June 2003. The English version, "It's Not Goodbye" originated all of the other versions, and was released in late 2003 as a single from the album, From the Inside.

It remains as one of the most enduring of Pausini's hits. It also helped to promote the album with the other hit-single "Un'emergenza d'amore". All of the three versions were released as singles, although only the Spanish and Italian ones had videoclips recorded.

Both Spanish and Italian versions were included in Pausini's greatest hits album, E ritorno da te.

Before it was released as a single, the song became famous in Brazil, where it was used as part of the soundtrack to the telenovela Pecado Capital. Later, Pausini released a special version of the single just in that country (see below).

It is widely regarded as one of the most passionate pieces of music in the world.

== Track listings ==
CD single – "In assenza di te"

1. "In assenza di te" – 4:30
2. "Un'emergenza d'amore" (Rob's Rock Remix) – 4:38

CD Maxi - "In assenza di te" Remix

1. "In assenza di te" (Dave's Radio Mix) – 3:46
2. "In assenza di te" (Album Version) – 4:38
3. "In assenza di te" (Dave's Club Mix) – 7:32
4. "Un'emergenza d'amore" (Rob's Rock Remix) – 4:38

CD single – "In assenza di te" – Germany – 2001 version

1. "In assenza di te" – 4:31
2. "E ritorno da te" – 3:59

CD single – "In assenza di te – Promo 00599 Warner Music Brasile(1999)

1. "In assenza di te"

CD single – "En ausencia de ti" - Promo 1192 Warner Music Messico, Promo 1155 Colombia (1999)

1. "En ausencia de ti"

CD single – "En ausencia de ti" - 3984261762 Warner Music Spagna (1999)

1. "En ausencia de ti"
2. "Emergencia de amor" (Rob's Rock)

CD single – "It's Not Goodbye" Promo 4097 Warner Music Europa

1. "It's not good-bye"

== Charts ==
Chart (2003–13)	Peak position
France (SNEP)	42
France Airplay (SNEP)	26
Italy (FIMI)	20
Poland (Polish Airplay Charts)	3

== Covers ==
The song was covered by Israeli singer Sarit Hadad, a Hebrew language version, "Ha-ezev Betochi" or "The Sadness Within Me", translated in English and a Malay version "Aku Masih Setia" by Dia Fadila.

In 2021, The English Version of the song "It's Not Goodbye" recorded by Janella Salvador and her new album "Melody of Love with Janella.
