= Con la musica alla radio =

Single by Laura Pausini

from the album Laura Live World Tour 09
- B-side: "Con la música en la radio"
- Released: 25 September 2009
- Genre: Pop, blues rock
- Length: 3:43
- Label: Atlantic
- Songwriters: Laura Pausini, Cheope, Daniel Vuletic
- Producer: Dado Parisini

Laura Pausini singles chronology
"Un fatto ovvio" (2009)	"Con la musica alla radio" (2009)	"Non sono lei" (2009)

"Con la musica alla radio" (English: With the Music Playing on the Radio) is a single released on 25 September 2009 by Italian singer-songwriter Laura Pausini. The track is the first single from Laura Live World Tour 09, her third live album (fourteenth overall), released in November 2009.

This song is one of the three previously unreleased tracks available on the album, along with "Non sono lei" (another studio track) and "Casomai" (performed live during a sound check for a concert in São Paulo, Brazil).

Just like her previous works, Pausini also recorded a Spanish version for the song, titled "Con la música en la radio", and this was sent to Spanish-language markets.

The single was certified gold by the Federation of the Italian Music Industry.

== Background ==
The lyrics were written by Laura Pausini and her long-time collaborator Cheope, while the music was composed by Daniel Vuletic. The song was arranged and produced by Dado Parisini.

"It's the first time that I'm not singing personal songs", stated the Italian singer in an interview. "My new tracks are not so autobigraphicals, differently from the major of my songs". Specifically talking about "Con la musica alla radio", Pausini said: "It's a very joyful and happy song".

During the "Inedito World Tour" between late 2011 and 2012, an English language version of the chorus of the song is played during a remix, which states "And we dance barefoot and the radio is on, are we strong enough, then put the record on".

In 2013, Pausini recorded a new version of her greatest hits album 20 - The Greatest Hits with a more dance-oriented sound.

== Music video ==
The music video for "Con la musica alla radio" was directed by Gaetano Morbioli, and it was filmed in New York, USA. The video concept was influenced by the New York City from the 80's.

The video was released first through the Italian website Deejay.it, where it was available in a high definition video file.

== Track listing ==
Digital download (Italian-language version)

No.	Title	Lyrics	Music	Length
1.	"Con la musica alla radio" (Italian-language Version)	Cheope, Laura Pausini	Danijel Vuletic	3:41

Digital download (Spanish-language version)

No.	Title	Lyrics	Music	Spanish adaptation	Length
1.	"Con la música en la radio" (Spanish-language Version)	Cheope, Laura Pausini	Danijel Vuletic	Ignacio Ballesteros	3:42

== Charts ==
=== Weekly charts ===
Chart (2009)	Peak position
Italy (FIMI)	10
Italy Airplay (Music Control)	5
Switzerland Airplay (Schweizer Hitparade)	20

=== Year-end charts ===
Chart (2009)	Position
Italy (FIMI)	32
