= Laura Xmas =

Laura Xmas/Laura Navidad
- English-language edition

Studio album by Laura Pausini
- Released: November 4, 2016
- Genre: Christmas, jazz, swing
- Language: English, Spanish, Italian, Latin, French
- Label: Warner
- Producer: Patrick Williams

Laura Pausini chronology
Simili/Similares (2015)	Laura Xmas/Laura Navidad (2016)	Fatti sentire/Hazte sentir (2018)

Singles from Laura Xmas/Laura Navidad
- 1. "Santa Claus Is Coming to Town" Released: November 6, 2016

Laura Xmas and Laura Navidad are the thirteenth studio albums and first Christmas albums by Italian singer Laura Pausini, released on November 4, 2016 by Warner Music. The album is a collaboration with Patrick Williams that offers renditions of popular Christmas songs in English, Spanish, Italian, French, and Latin. The English-language edition is also Pausini’s second album in English since the release of From the Inside in 2002.

The song Astro del ciel is performed in Italian in the English-language edition but performed in the Spanish-language edition as Noche de Paz. The song Adeste Fideles is only performed in Latin for both editions. A special version was released for the francophone market, with the song Noël Blanc substituting White Christmas.

== Track listings ==
=== Laura Xmas ===
Standard edition
No.	Title	Lyrics	Music	Length
1.	"It's Beginning to Look a Lot Like Christmas"	Meredith Willson	Meredith Willson	3:56
2.	"Let It Snow! Let It Snow! Let It Snow!"	Sammy Cahn	Jule Styne	3:01
3.	"Santa Claus Is Coming to Town"	John Frederick Coots, Haven Gillespie	John Frederick Coots, Haven Gillespie	2:07
4.	"Jingle Bell Rock"	Joseph Carleton Beal, James Ross Boothe	Joseph Carleton Beal, James Ross Boothe	3:47
5.	"Have Yourself a Merry Little Christmas"	Ralph Blane	Hugh Martin	4:05
6.	"Jingle Bells"	James Pierpont	James Pierpont	3:27
7.	"White Christmas"	Irving Berlin	Irving Berlin	2:22
8.	"Happy Xmas (War Is Over)"	John Lennon, Yoko Ono	John Lennon, Yoko Ono	3:24
9.	"Feliz Navidad"	José Feliciano	José Feliciano	3:44
10.	"Adeste Fideles"	John Francis Wade	John Francis Wade	3:11
11.	"Oh Happy Day"	Edwin Hawkins	Edwin Hawkins	4:40
12.	"Astro del Ciel"	Joseph Mohr	Franz Xaver Gruber	4:48
Total length:				42:37

French edition
No.	Title	Lyrics	Music	Length
7.	"Noël Blanc"	Irving Berlin	Irving Berlin	2:22
Total length:				42:37

=== Laura Navidad ===
No.	Title	Lyrics	Music	Length
1.	"It's Beginning to Look a Lot Like Christmas"	Meredith Willson	Meredith Willson	3:56
2.	"Va a Nevar"	Sammy Cahn	Jule Styne	3:01
3.	"Santa Claus Llegó A La Ciudad"	John Frederick Coots, Haven Gillespie	John Frederick Coots, Haven Gillespie	2:07
4.	"Jingle Bell Rock"	Joseph Carleton Beal, James Ross Boothe	Joseph Carleton Beal, James Ross Boothe	3:47
5.	"Have Yourself a Merry Little Christmas"	Ralph Blane	Hugh Martin	4:05
6.	"Jingle Bells"	James Pierpont	James Pierpont	3:27
7.	"Blanca Navidad"	Irving Berlin	Irving Berlin	2:22
8.	"Happy Xmas (War Is Over)"	John Lennon, Yoko Ono	John Lennon, Yoko Ono	3:24
9.	"Feliz Navidad"	José Feliciano	José Feliciano	3:44
10.	"Adeste Fideles"	John Francis Wade	John Francis Wade	3:11
11.	"Oh Happy Day"	Edwin Hawkins	Edwin Hawkins	4:40
12.	"Noche de Paz"	Joseph Mohr	Franz Xaver Gruber	4:48
Total length:				42:37

=== Laura Xmas (Deluxe) ===
CD
No.	Title	Lyrics	Music	Length
1.	"It's Beginning to Look a Lot Like Christmas"	Meredith Willson	Meredith Willson	3:56
2.	"Let It Snow! Let It Snow! Let It Snow!"	Sammy Cahn	Jule Styne	3:01
3.	"Blanca Navidad"	Irving Berlin	Irving Berlin	2:22
4.	"Astro del Ciel"	Joseph Mohr	Franz Xaver Gruber	4:48
5.	"Santa Claus Llegó A La Ciudad"	John Frederick Coots, Haven Gillespie	John Frederick Coots, Haven Gillespie	2:07
6.	"Have Yourself a Merry Little Christmas"	Ralph Blane	Hugh Martin	4:05
7.	"Va a Nevar"	Sammy Cahn	Jule Styne	3:01
8.	"Santa Claus Is Coming to Town"	John Frederick Coots, Haven Gillespie	John Frederick Coots, Haven Gillespie	2:07
9.	"Jingle Bell Rock"	Joseph Carleton Beal, James Ross Boothe	Joseph Carleton Beal, James Ross Boothe	3:47
10.	"Noël Blanc"	Irving Berlin	Irving Berlin	2:22
11.	"Jingle Bells"	James Pierpont	James Pierpont	3:27
12.	"White Christmas"	Irving Berlin	Irving Berlin	2:22
13.	"Feliz Navidad"	José Feliciano	José Feliciano	3:44
14.	"Happy Xmas (War Is Over)"	John Lennon, Yoko Ono	John Lennon, Yoko Ono	3:24
15.	"Adeste Fideles"	John Francis Wade	John Francis Wade	3:11
16.	"Noche de Paz"	Joseph Mohr	Franz Xaver Gruber	4:48
17.	"Oh Happy Day"	Edwin Hawkins	Edwin Hawkins	4:40
Total length:				57:19

DVD
No.	Title	Lyrics	Music	Length
1.	"Laura Xmas"	-	-	-
2.	"Laura Navidad"	-	-	-
3.	"Santa Claus Is Coming to Town" (Videoclip)	John Frederick Coots, Haven Gillespie	John Frederick Coots, Haven Gillespie	2:21
4.	"Santa Claus Llegó A La Ciudad" (Videoclip)	John Frederick Coots, Haven Gillespie	John Frederick Coots, Haven Gillespie	2:21
5.	"Noël Blanc" (Videoclip)	Irving Berlin	Irving Berlin	2:19

== Charts ==
=== Weekly charts ===
Chart (2016)	Peak position
Belgian Albums (Ultratop Flanders)	93
Belgian Albums (Ultratop Wallonia)	41
French Albums (SNEP)	182
Hungarian Albums (MAHASZ)	25
Italian Albums (FIMI)	1
Spanish Albums (PROMUSICAE)	15
Swiss Albums (Schweizer Hitparade)	19
US Top Classical Albums (Billboard)	10
US World Albums (Billboard)	3

=== Year-end charts ===
Chart (2016)	Position
Italian Albums (FIMI)	6

== Certifications ==
Region	Certification	Certified units/sales
Italy (FIMI)	2× Platinum	100,000^{*}
^{*} Sales figures based on certification alone.
