= Non sono lei =

Single by Laura Pausini

from the album Laura Live World Tour 09
- B-side: "Ella no soy"
- Released: November 20, 2009
- Genre: Pop
- Length: 3:43
- Label: Atlantic
- Songwriters: Laura Pausini, Cheope
- Producers: Dado Parisini, Laura Pausini

Laura Pausini singles chronology
"Con la musica alla radio" (2009)	"Non sono lei" (2009)	"Casomai" (2009)

"Non sono lei" (English: I am not her) is a single released on November 20, 2009 by Italian singer-songwriter Laura Pausini.

The track is the second single from Laura Live World Tour 09, her third live album (fourteenth overall), released in November 2009.

The song was recorded also in Spanish, with this version being named "Ella no soy" and being released as the second single of Laura Live Gira Mundial 09. One music video was recorded and released for each version.

The song is a new one, written by Laura Pausini and Cheope, the music being composed by Laura Pausini e Daniel Vuletic. Ignacio Ballesteros translated the song into Spanish.

== Music video ==
The video (in Italian and Spanish) was directed by Gaetano Morbioli and shot in summer 2009 in New York City.

The Non sono lei e Ella no soy music videos were inserted on the DVD Laura Live World Tour 09 e Laura Live Gira Mundial 09, along with the making of both videos.

The music video begins with two children (a boy and a girl) walking on a street, then the girl stops in front of a music store. A cut happens and the window is shown, with an image of Pausini dressed in a 1960 style dress. The image begins to move. During the videoclip, images of a couple are shown, with the woman discovering that her husband had cheated on her (photographs are shown). Pausini is shown again, dancing and singing on the porch of a building. At the end, the image from the window stops moving, the boy regathers with the girl, then both look at the immobile image of Pausini.

== Promotion ==
"Non sono lei" and "Ella no soy" were performed during Pausini's fifth world tour, but no performance of the songs were included on the DVD.

From the three new songs published on Laura Live, only "Non sono lei" is not present on the Inedito World Tour.

== Charts ==
Chart (2009)	Peak position
Italy (FIMI)	32
