= One More Time (Laura Pausini song) =

Single by Laura Pausini and Richard Marx

from the album Days in Avalon and Message in a Bottle: Music from and Inspired by the Motion Picture
- Released: 1999
- Genre: Soft rock, adult contemporary
- Length: 4:25
- Songwriter: Richard Marx
- Producer: David Foster

Laura Pausini singles chronology
"La mia risposta" (1999)	"One More Time" (1999)	"Tra te e il mare" (2000)

Music video
- "One More Time" on YouTube

"One More Time" is a song by Richard Marx which he wrote for Laura Pausini. Later Marx recorded the song for his sixth studio album, Days in Avalon. Pausini's version was originally released in 1999 for the movie Message in a Bottle.

The song is available on both Pausini's greatest hits compilations, E ritorno da te and 20 - The Greatest Hits.

The song was performed live during Pausini's third world tour. Live versions were included on Pausini's first DVD. There is a little-known video clip of an acoustic performance of the song included on Pausini's now-discontinued Video Collection.

== Music video ==
A music video of the song was not recorded, however, the acoustic version present on Pausini's discontinued VHS "Video Collection 1993–1999" is considered to be the official one. It shows only Pausini in a simple plan, with a black dress, then in front of a white piano.

== Track listing ==
CD single – "One More Time – Music from and Inspired by the Motion Picture Message in a Bottle"

1. "One More Time" – 4:22
2. "Don't" (performed by Yve.n.Adam) – 3:45
3. "Somewhere in the Middle" (performed by Nine Sky Wonder) – 3:58

== Covers ==
Myriam Hernandez covered the song with Spanish lyrics for her album + y más... (2000).

== Personnel ==
Music personnel

- Richard Marx – composer
- David Foster – keyboards
- Felipe Elgueta – synthesizer programming
- Dean Parks – guitars
- William Ross – orchestra arrangement

Production personnel

- David Foster – producer
- Humberto Gatica – mixing
- Felipe Elgueta – engineer
- David Reitzas – additional engineer

== Charts ==
Chart (1999)	Peak position
Netherlands (Single Top 100)	76
