= Tra te e il mare (song) =

Single by Laura Pausini

from the album Tra te e il mare
- B-side: "Looking for an Angel"
- Released: 21 August 2000
- Genre: Pop
- Length: 3:49
- Songwriter: Biagio Antonacci
- Producers: Laura Pausini; Alfredo Cerruti; Dado Parisini

Laura Pausini singles chronology
"One More Time" (1999)	"Tra te e il mare" (2000)	"Il mio sbaglio più grande" (2001)

Music video
- "Tra te e il mare" on YouTube

"Tra te e il mare" (lit. '"Between you and the sea"') is a song written by Italian singer-songwriter Biagio Antonacci and originally recorded by Laura Pausini. The song, produced by Pausini herself with Alfredo Cerruti and Dado Parisini, was released on 21 August 2000 as the first single from the album of the same name. A Spanish-language version of the song, with lyrics adapted by Ignacio Ballesteros and titled "Entre tú y mil mares", was also recorded and released by Pausini for the Hispanic market.

The single hit the top five in Italy, and entered the top twenty of the US Hot Latin Songs chart, as well as on the French Singles Chart.

== Covers and other recordings ==
After writing the song, Antonacci recorded "Entre tú y mil mares" as a duet with the track's original performer, Pausini, and included the track in the compilation album Cuànto tiempo... y ahora, released in 2003. The Italian-language version of the song was recorded by Antonacci in 2008, for the album Il cielo ha una porta sola. This version of the song includes a sample from "Start Me Up" by the Rolling Stones.

In 2013, the song was re-recorded with a new arrangement for Pausini's greatest hits album 20 - The Greatest Hits / 20 - Grandes Éxitos. This version of the song was re-issued in 2014 as a duet with Spanish singer Melendi.

== Live performances ==
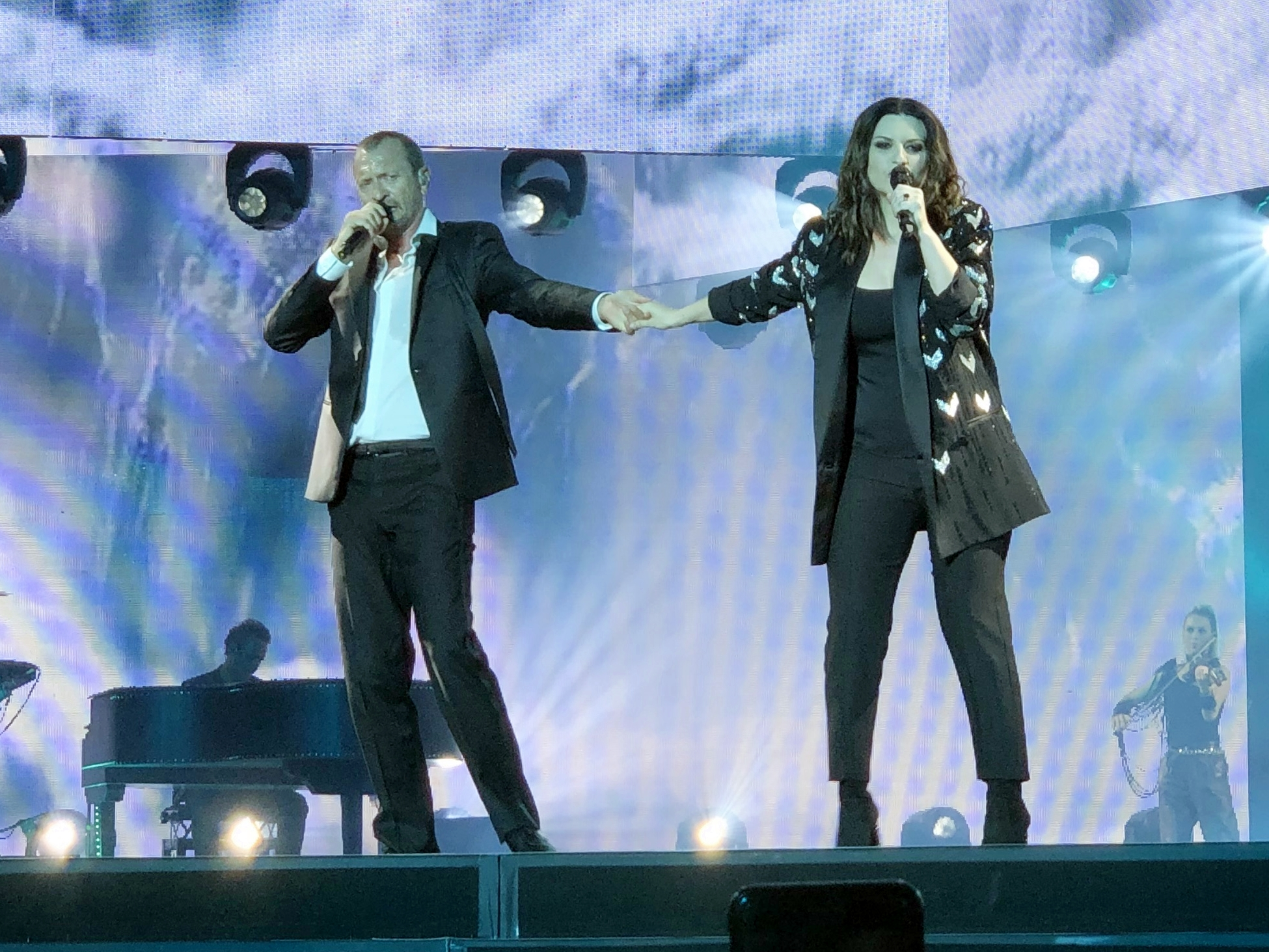
Biagio Antonacci, who wrote "Tra te e il mare", performed the song with Laura Pausini several times

Pausini performed the song several times. In February 2001, Pausini gave a rendition of the song as a part of a medley during the 51st Sanremo Music Festival. During the concert she held il Milan on 2 December 2001, she performed the song with Biagio Antonacci. The live performance was included in the video album Live 2001/2002 World Tour, released in 2002. Several other live versions of the song were released over the following years, and included in the albums Live in Paris 05, San Siro 2007, and Laura Live.

During the live show Amiche per l'Abruzzo, created by Pausini herself in support of the populations affected by the 2009 L'Aquila earthquake, Pausini performed "Tra te e il mare" as a duet with Italian singer Elisa. In 2014, during his concert at the San Siro stadium in Milan, Antonacci sang "Tra te e il mare" with Eros Ramazzotti and Laura Pausini. The live recording was featured on the album Palco Antonacci.

In 2020, Pausini performed an acoustic version of the song at the empty Colosseum in Rome, as part of the virtual event I Love Beirut, created by Lebanese-born British singer Mika in support of Lebanon after the 2020 Beirut explosion.

== Music video ==
The music video for the song was directed by Alberto Colombo. It has a total length of 3 minutes and 49 seconds.

In 2015, a new music video was released for the Spanish-language version of the song, "Entre tú y mil mares", recorded as a duet with Melendi. The new video was filmed in Madrid by directors Leandro Manuel Emede and Nicolò Cerioni.

== Track listing ==
CD single – "Tra te e il mare" – Italy (2000)

1. "Tra te e il mare" – 3:49
2. "Tra te e il mare" (Instrumental) – 3:49
3. "Looking for an Angel" – 4:13

CD single – "Tra te e il mare" – Germany (2001)

1. "Tra te e il mare" – 3:49
2. "La solitudine" (Original version) – 4:04

CD single – "Entre tú y mil mares" – Spain (2000)

1. "Entre tú y mil mares" (Progressive Brizz Mix Radio Edit) – 3:47
2. "Entre tú y mil mares" (Progressive Brizz Mix Extended Club) – 8:05
3. "Tra te e il mare" (Progressive Brizz Mix Radio Edit) – 3:47

== Charts ==
Chart (2000–01)	Peak position
Belgium (Ultratip Bubbling Under Wallonia)	9
France (SNEP)	16
France Airplay (SNEP)	16
Italy (FIMI)	4
Italy Airplay (Music Control)	3
Netherlands (Single Top 100)	82
Switzerland (Schweizer Hitparade)	42
US Hot Latin Songs (Billboard)	13
US Latin Pop Airplay (Billboard)	10
US Tropical Songs (Billboard)	13
