= From the Inside (Laura Pausini album) =

Studio album by Laura Pausini
- Released: November 5, 2002
- Recorded: June 2001 – May 2002
- Genre: Pop; dance-pop
- Length: 46:12
- Language: English
- Label: Atlantic, CGD East West
- Producer: Laura Pausini; K. C. Porter; Alfredo Cerruti; Craig Kallman; Ron Shapiro; Ruby Marchand

Laura Pausini chronology
Live 2001–2002 World Tour (2001)	From the Inside (2002)	Resta in ascolto/Escucha (2004)

Singles from From the Inside
- 1. "Surrender" Released: August 24, 2002; 2. "I Need Love" Released: November 2002; 3. "It's Not Good-bye" Released: April 2003; 4. "If That's Love" Released: July 2003

Professional ratings
Review scores
Source	Rating
AllMusic	3.5/5 stars
Blender	2/5 stars

From the Inside is the seventh studio album and English-language debut album by Italian singer Laura Pausini, released on November 5, 2002, by Atlantic Records. This was Pausini's only studio album in English until the release of Laura Xmas in 2016

== Background ==
Most of the album's 12 tracks fall in the pop genre. Two of the songs, "Love Comes From The Inside" and "I Do 2 Be", are outside pop. Two songs were first released in Italian and Spanish in previous albums It's Not Goodbye and Everyday Is A Monday. The latter was originally written in English and adapted later into Italian and Spanish, though it first released in these languages. Important songwriters appear in the credits of the album, such as Andreas Carlsson, K. C. Porter, and longtime Madonna collaborator Patrick Leonard. The recording company (Atlantic Records) promoted the single Surrender more as a dance song (helped by the several remixes of the song) than a pop song. In this way, Surrender was able to reach No. 1 number one in the Billboard's Hot Dance Club Play. The same happened for the second single, "If That's Love". In January 2003, the album was released in Europe, as well.

Despite all Pausini's efforts, the album did not get the success she expected in the United States, where it sold 33,000 copies, according to Nielsen-Soundscan. Frustrated at the incorrect promotion strategy by Atlantic Records, which promoted the album as a dance album, Pausini asked to have From the Inside promoted to an adult audience. When Atlantic refused, Pausini ceased further promotion in the United States and returned to Italy, leaving From the Inside to the label. The promotion of the album went on in Europe for some months.

In late 2011, songs "For Your Love" and "Kiss Kiss" were fully leaked in the internet. After some polemics, Pausini confirmed that both tracks were demonstration tracks from From the Inside, but did not make their way into the final cut. Though not confirmed, "Kiss Kiss" is supposed to have been discarded due to it being out of Pausini's style.

== Track listing ==
Standard edition
No.	Title	Writer(s)	Length
1.	"I Need Love"	Kara DioGuardi, Ulf Lindström, Johan Ekhé	3:54
2.	"Do I Dare"	Evan Rogers, Carl Sturken	4:04
3.	"Surrender"	Dane de Viller, Sean Hosein, Steven Smith, Anthony Anderson	3:57
4.	"If That's Love"	Andrew Logan, Pam Reswick	3:34
5.	"It's Not Good-bye"	Antonio Galbiati, Laura Pausini, Cheope, Shelly Peiken	4:38
6.	"Love Comes from the Inside"	Patrick Leonard, Olivia d'Abo	3:57
7.	"Every Little Thing You Do"	Stephanie Bentley, George Teren	3:59
8.	"Every Day Is a Monday"	Andreas Carlsson, Alistair Thomson	3:06
9.	"You Are"	Peter Bertilsson, Andreas Aleman	4:13
10.	"I Do To Be"	Kara DioGuardi, Ulf Lindström, Johan Ekhé, Jessica Pihlnäs	3:25
11.	"Without You"	K. C. Porter, Eric Buffat, Arnie Roman	4:32
12.	"Every Little Thing You Do" (Piano/Vocal Reprise)	Stephanie Bentley, George Teren	2:53

International edition bonus track
No.	Title	Writer(s)	Length
13.	"Surrender" (Toronto Chilled mix)	de Viller, Hosein, Smith, Anderson	5:05

Australian edition bonus track
No.	Title	Writer(s)	Length
14.	"Surrender" (Eric Kupper Radio Mix)	de Viller, Hosein, Smith, Anderson	4:06

Japanese edition
No.	Title	Writer(s)	Length
1.	"Surrender"	Dane de Viller, Sean Hosein, Steven Smith, Anthony Anderson	3:57
2.	"Do I Dare"	Evan Rogers, Carl Sturken	4:04
3.	"Every Day Is a Monday"	Andreas Carlsson, Alistair Thomson	3:06
4.	"I Need Love"	Kara DioGuardi, Ulf Lindström, Johan Ekhé	3:54
5.	"It's Not Good-bye"	Antonio Galbiati, Laura Pausini, Cheope, Shelly Peiken	4:38
6.	"If That's Love"	Andrew Logan, Pam Reswick	3:34
7.	"Love Comes from the Inside"	Patrick Leonard, Olivia d'Abo	3:57
8.	"Every Little Thing You Do"	Stephanie Bentley, George Teren	3:59
9.	"You Are"	Peter Bertilsson, Andreas Aleman	4:13
10.	"I Do To Be"	Kara DioGuardi, Ulf Lindström, Johan Ekhé, Jessica Pihlnäs	3:25
11.	"Without You"	K. C. Porter, Eric Buffat, Arnie Roman	4:32
12.	"Every Little Thing You Do" (Piano/Vocal Reprise)	Stephanie Bentley, George Teren	2:53
13.	"Surrender" (Ford's Remix Edit)	de Viller, Hosein, Smith, Anderson	4:36
14.	"Surrender" (Toronto Chilled Mix Edit)	de Viller, Hosein, Smith, Anderson	3:26
15.	"Il mio sbaglio più grande"	Laura Pausini, Giuseppe Dati, Cheope	3:05
16.	"In assenza di te"	Laura Pausini, Cheope	4:30

== Charts ==
=== Weekly charts ===
Chart (2003)	Peak position
Belgian Albums (Ultratop Wallonia)	38
Dutch Albums (Album Top 100)	32
Finnish Albums (Suomen virallinen lista)	3
French Albums (SNEP)	34
German Albums (Offizielle Top 100)	55
Italian Albums (FIMI)	3
Japanese Albums (Oricon)	66
Spanish Albums (PROMUSICAE)	12
Swedish Albums (Sverigetopplistan)	24
Swiss Albums (Schweizer Hitparade)	4
US Heatseekers Albums (Billboard)	15

=== Year-end charts ===
Chart (2003)	Position
Italian Albums (FIMI)	58

== Certifications and sales ==
Region	Certification	Certified units/sales
Finland	—	10,514
Spain (Promusicae)	Gold	50,000^{^}
Switzerland (IFPI Switzerland)	Gold	20,000^{^}
United States	—	33,000
Summaries
World	—	900,000
^{^} Shipments figures based on certification alone.

== Release history ==
Region	Date	Label
United States	5 November 2002	Atlantic Records
Canada	5 November 2002	Atlantic Records
Mexico	5 November 2002	Atlantic Records
Italy	24 January 2003	CGD East West
