= Il mio sbaglio più grande =

2001 single by Laura Pausini

Single by Laura Pausini

from the album Tra te e il mare
- B-side: "Un error de los grandes" (Spanish version)
- Released: 7 January 2001
- Genre: Pop
- Length: 3:06
- Label: Fri Records
- Songwriters: Andreas Carlsson and Ali Thomson

Laura Pausini singles chronology
"Tra te e il mare" (2000)	"Il mio sbaglio più grande" (2001)	"Fidati di me" (2001)

"Il mio sbaglio più grande" (English: My biggest mistake) is the second single of Italian singer Laura Pausini's Tra te e il mare. The song is translated into Spanish under the title "Un error de los grandes". On her English-language album From the Inside, the song has an English version (which originated both the Italian and the Spanish versions) named "Every Day Is a Monday", which is also included on her greatest hits album 20 - The Greatest Hits.

== Video ==
The music video of "Il mio sbaglio più grande" was shot in Milan and was directed by Marco Salom. The sister of Laura Pausini, Silvia Pausini makes a brief appearance in the video. The video shows Laura Pausini with her band on a stage in front of a live audience.

== Track listing ==
Italian - Single

1. "Il mio sbaglio più grande"
2. "Il mio sbaglio più grande" (Instrumental Version)
3. "Un error de los grandes"

Spanish - Single

1. "Un error de los grandes"

== Charts ==
Chart (2001)	Peak position
Italy (FIMI)	20
Netherlands (Single Top 100)	93
Switzerland (Schweizer Hitparade)	86
