= E ritorno da te (song) =

Single by Laura Pausini

from the album The Best of Laura Pausini: E ritorno da te
- Released: September 2001
- Genre: Pop
- Length: 4:01
- Label: CGD
- Songwriters: Laura Pausini, Cheope, Daniel
- Producers: Laura Pausini, Alfredo Cerruti, Dado Parisini

Laura Pausini singles chronology
"Volevo dirti che ti amo" (2001)	"E ritorno da te" (2001)	"Una storia che vale" (2002)

"E ritorno da te" (literally And I comeback to you) is a song by Italian recording artist Laura Pausini, released in September 2001 as the lead single from her first compilation album, The Best of Laura Pausini: E ritorno da te. The Spanish-language version of the song, titled "Volveré junto a ti" (I'll go back next to you), received an ASCAP Latin Music Award for Pop/Ballad Song in 2003, while the Italian-language version received a nomination for International Song of the Year at the 2003 NRJ Music Awards.

The song was inspired by Pausini's relationship with her manager Alfredo Cerruti.

In 2013, Pausini recorded a new version of the song for her second compilation album, 20 - The Greatest Hits.

== Track listing ==
CD single – "E ritorno da te" (2001)

1. "E ritorno da te" – 4:01
2. "E ritorno da te" (Instrumental version) – 4:01
3. "Fíate de mí" – 3:49

CD single – "Volveré junto a ti" (2001)

1. "Volveré junto a ti" – 4:01

Digital download – "E ritorno da te" (2004)

1. "E ritorno da te" (Live) – 4:19

== Music video ==
The music video for the song was shot in Los Angeles and directed by Gabriele Muccino. It was first broadcast in Italy on 21 September 2001 by Canale 5, and it was officially released on 24 September 2001. The video also features Italian actor Silvio Muccino and American actor Tyler Mia.

== Charts ==
Chart (2001–02)	Peak position
France (SNEP)	38
France Airplay (SNEP)	23
Italy (FIMI)	3
Italy Airplay (Music Control)	6
Netherlands (Single Top 100)	20
Switzerland (Schweizer Hitparade)	47
US Latin Pop Airplay (Billboard)	8
US Hot Latin Songs (Billboard)	11
US Latin Tropical (Billboard)	16
