= Live 2001–2002 World Tour =

Video DVD by Laura Pausini
- Released: 30 December 2001
- Recorded: 2 December 2001
- Venue: Mediolanum Forum, Milan, Italy
- Genre: Pop rock
- Length: 145:00
- Language: Italian, Spanish
- Label: Atlantic
- Producer: Laura Pausini, Gabriele Parisi

Laura Pausini chronology
The Best of… E ritorno da te/Lo mejor de… Volveré junto a ti (2001)	Live 2001–2002 World Tour (2001)	From the Inside (2002)

Live 2001–2002 World Tour is the first DVD by Italian singer Laura Pausini. It contains footage recorded at the Mediolanum Forum di Milano on 2 December 2001. The album supports Pausini's third world tour.

== Track listing ==
Live

#	Name
01.	E ritorno da te (Live) • Musica: Daniel • Testo: Laura Pausini, Cheope
02.	La mia risposta (Live) • Musica: Claudio Guidetti • Testo: Laura Pausini, Cheope
03.	Gente (Live) • Musica: Angelo Valsiglio • Testo: Cheope, Marco Marati
04.	Il mondo che vorrei (Live) • Musica: Eric Buffat, Gianni Salvatori • Testo: Laura Pausini
05.	Ascolta il tuo cuore (Live) • Musica: Vito Mastrofrancesco, Alberto Mastrofrancesco, Charles Cohiba • Testo: Cheope, Fabrizio Pausini
06.	Un'emergenza d'amore (Live) • Musica: Eric Buffat • Testo: Laura Pausini, Cheope, Massimo Pacciani
07.	Seamisai (Live) • Musica: Giuseppe Carella • Testo: Cheope • Adattamento portoghese: Gilberto Gil
08.	Fidati di me (Live) • Musica: Giuseppe Tosetto • Testo: Laura Pausini, Giuseppe Dati, Cheope
09.	La solitudine (Live) • Musica: Angelo Valsiglio, Pietro Cremonesi • Testo: Federico Cavalli, Pietro Cremonesi
10.	Le cose che vivi (Live) • Musica: Giuseppe Carella, Fabrizio Baldoni, Gino de Stefani • Testo: Cheope, Fabrizio Pausini
11.	Tra te e il mare (Live) • Duett with: Biagio Antonacci • Musica & Testo: Biagio Antonacci
12.	Una storia che vale (Live) • Musica: Daniel • Testo: Laura Pausini, Cheope
13.	One More Time (Live) • Musica & Testo: Richard Marx
14.	Incancellabile (Live) • Musica: Giuseppe Carella, Fabrizio Baldoni, Gino de Stefani • Testo: Cheope
15.	Angeli nel blu (Live) • Musica: Eric Buffat, Leonardo Abbate • Testo: Cheope, Leonello Meneghetti
16.	Mi rubi l'anima (Live) • Musica: Angelo Valsiglio, Pietro Cremonesi • Testo: Federico Cavalli
17.	Strani amori (Live) • Musica: Angelo Valsiglio, Roberto Buti • Testo: Cheope, Marco Marati, Francesco Tanini
18.	Non c'è (Live) • Musica: Angelo Valsiglio, Pietro Cremonesi • Testo: Federico Cavalli, Pietro Cremonesi
19.	In assenza di te (Live) • Musica: Antonio Galbiati • Testo: Laura Pausini, Cheope
20.	Il mio sbaglio più grande (Live) • Musica: Andreas Carlsson, Alistair Thomson • Testo: Laura Pausini, Giuseppe Dati, Cheope
21.	E ritorno da te (Live) • Musica: Daniel • Testo: Laura Pausini, Cheope

Bonus tracks

#	Name
1.	Volvere junto a ti (Videoclip)
2.	E ritorno da te (Videoclip)
3.	Una storia che vale (Videoclip)
4.	Dos historias iguales (Videoclip)
5.	Volveré junto a ti (Spanish tracks)
6.	Entre tú y mil mares (Spanish tracks)
7.	Inolvidable (Spanish tracks)
8.	Amores extraños (Spanish tracks)
9.	Videowall
10.	You were here
11.	Theater box construction
12.	Una storia che vale (Backstage)
13.	E ritorno da te (Backstage)

== Certifications ==
Region	Certification	Certified units/sales
Argentina (CAPIF)	Platinum	8,000^{^}
Brazil (Pro-Música Brasil)	Gold	25,000^{*}
^{*} Sales figures based on certification alone.^{^} Shipments figures based on certification alone.
