= La mia risposta =

La mia risposta/Mi respuesta
- Italian-language edition

Studio album by Laura Pausini
- Released: October 15, 1998
- Recorded: 1997–1998
- Studio: Morning Studio, Carimate; Conway Recording Studios, Los Angeles
- Length: 54:56
- Language: Italian; Spanish; English
- Label: CGD East West
- Producer: Alfredo Cerruti, Dado Parisini, Laura Pausini

Laura Pausini chronology
| Le cose che vivi/Las cosas que vives (1996) | La mia risposta/Mi respuesta (1998) | Tra te il mare/Entre tú y mil mares (2000) |

Singles from La mia risposta/Mi respuesta
- 1. "Un'emergenza d'amore/Emergencia de amor" Released: October 15, 1998; 2. "In assenza di te/En ausencia de ti" Released: January 1999; 3. "La mia risposta/Mi respuesta" Released: May 1999; 4. "Me siento tan bien" Released: 2000

La mia risposta and Mi respuesta (English: My Answer) are the fifth studio albums by Italian singer Laura Pausini, released on October 15, 1998 by CGD East West (Warner) Records.

Between February and April 1999, the La mia risposta World Tour was held to support and promote the album in Europe. The album was not as successful as her previous one, Le cose che vivi. As of September 2000, it has sold around 2 million copies worldwide. The singles taken from the album were "Una Emergenza D'Amore / Emergencia de Amor", "In Assenza Di Te / En Ausencia de Ti" and "La Mia Risposta / Mi Respuesta", placing themselves in the first places of popularity in Italy, Europe and Latin America. And "Che Bene Mi Fai/ Me Siento Tan Bien" only was a promotional single to Spain.

== Track listing ==
=== La mia risposta ===
| No. | Title | Lyrics | Music | Length |
|---|---|---|---|---|
| 1. | "La mia risposta" | Laura Pausini, Cheope | Claudio Guidetti | 3:41 |
| 2. | "Stanotte stai con me" | Pausini, Cheope | Giuseppe Tosetto | 4:09 |
| 3. | "Un'emergenza d'amore" | Pausini, Cheope, Massimo Pacciani | Eric Buffat | 4:29 |
| 4. | "Anna dimmi sì" | Pausini | Buffat | 3:57 |
| 5. | "Una storia seria" | Pausini, Cheope | Salvatore Mauro Ragusa | 4:41 |
| 6. | "Come una danza" | Pausini, Cheope | Buffat | 5:18 |
| 7. | "Che bene mi fai" | Pausini, Cheope | Buffat | 4:20 |
| 8. | "In assenza di te" | Pausini, Cheope | Antonio Galbiati | 4:30 |
| 9. | "Succede al cuore" | Cheope | Ragusa | 3:41 |
| 10. | "Tu cosa sogni?" | Cheope | Tosetto | 3:50 |
| 11. | "Buone verità" | Pausini | Giorgio Vanni, Massimo Longhi | 4:01 |
| 12. | "La felicità" | Pausini, Cheope | Buffat, Galbiati | 3:56 |
| 13. | "Looking for an Angel" | Phil Collins | Collins | 4:13 |

=== Mi respuesta ===
| No. | Title | Lyrics | Music | Spanish adaptation | Length |
|---|---|---|---|---|---|
| 1. | "Mi respuesta" | Laura Pausini, Cheope | Claudio Guidetti | Pausini, Badia | 3:41 |
| 2. | "Quédate esta noche" | Pausini, Cheope | Giuseppe Tosetto | Badia | 4:09 |
| 3. | "Emergencia de amor" | Pausini, Cheope, Massimo Pacciani | Eric Buffat | Pausini, C. Pixin, León Tristán | 4:29 |
| 4. | "Ana dime sí" | Pausini | Buffat | Pausini, Badia | 3:57 |
| 5. | "Una historia seria" | Pausini, Cheope | Salvatore Mauro Ragusa | Pausini, Badia | 4:41 |
| 6. | "Como una danza" | Pausini, Cheope | Buffat | Pausini, Badia | 5:18 |
| 7. | "Me siento tan bien" | Pausini, Cheope | Buffat | Badia | 4:20 |
| 8. | "En ausencia de ti" | Pausini, Cheope | Antonio Galbiati | Pausini, Badia | 4:30 |
| 9. | "Sucede a veces" | Cheope | Ragusa | Pausini, Badia | 3:41 |
| 10. | "¿Tú con qué sueñas?" | Cheope | Tosetto | Pausini, Badia | 3:50 |
| 11. | "Una gran verdad" | Pausini | Giorgio Vanni, Massimo Longhi | Pausini | 4:01 |
| 12. | "Felicidad" | Pausini, Cheope | Buffat, Galbiati | Pausini | 3:56 |
| 13. | "Looking for an Angel" | Phil Collins | Collins | — | 4:13 |

== Charts ==
| Chart (1998–99) | Peak Position |
|---|---|
| Belgian Albums (Ultratop Wallonia) | 26 |
| Dutch Albums (Album Top 100) | 26 |
| European Top 100 Albums (Billboard) | 9 |
| French Albums (SNEP) | 64 |
| German Albums (Offizielle Top 100) | 66 |
| Italian Albums (FIMI) | 1 |
| Spanish Albums (PROMUSICAE) | 8 |
| Swedish Albums (Sverigetopplistan) | 30 |
| Swiss Albums (Schweizer Hitparade) | 3 |
| US Top Latin Albums (Billboard) | 23 |
| US Latin Pop Albums (Billboard) | 12 |

== Certifications ==
| Region | Certification | Certified units/sales |
|---|---|---|
| Argentina (CAPIF) | Gold | 30,000^{^} |
| Italy (FIMI) | 2× Platinum | 400,000 |
| Spain (Promusicae) | 2× Platinum | 200,000^{^} |
| Switzerland (IFPI Switzerland) | Gold | 25,000^{^} |
Summaries
| Worldwide | — | 2,000,000 |
^{^} Shipments figures based on certification alone.
