= Un'emergenza d'amore =

Single by Laura Pausini

from the album La mia risposta
- B-side: "Ascolta il tuo cuore", "Angeles en el cielo"
- Released: 11 September 1998
- Genre: Pop
- Length: 4:45
- Label: DDD
- Songwriters: Laura Pausini, Massimo Pacciani, Eric Buffat.

Laura Pausini singles chronology
| "La voce" (1997) | "Un'emergenza d'amore" (1998) | "In assenza di te" (1998) |

Alternative cover
- US and Spanish Cover

"Un'emergenza d'amore" (English: A love emergency) is a pop song recorded by Italian singer Laura Pausini for her album La mia risposta and released as the set's first single on 11 September 1998. "Emergencia de amor" is its Spanish-language version, adapted by Pausini herself with Carlos Pixin and León Tristán.

== Track listing ==
CD single – Germany

1. "Un'emergenza d'amore" (Radio Edit) – 3:50
2. "Un'emergenza d'amore" (Instrumental) – 4:29

CD single – Italy

1. "Un'emergenza d'amore" (Radio Edit) – 3:50
2. "Un'emergenza d'amore" (Instrumental) – 4:29
3. "Ascolta il tuo cuore" – 4:58
4. "Angeles en el cielo" – 5:15

Promo CD single – Germany

1. "Un'emergenza d'amore" (Radio Edit) – 3:50

CD single – Mexico

1. "Emergencia de amor" (Radio Edit) – 3:50

== Charts ==
| Chart (1998) | Peak position |
|---|---|
| Italy (FIMI) | 8 |
| Netherlands (Single Top 100) | 77 |
| Switzerland (Schweizer Hitparade) | 43 |
| US Hot Latin Songs (Billboard) | 23 |
| US Latin Pop Airplay (Billboard) | 8 |
| US Tropical Songs (Billboard) | 13 |
