= List of number-one hits of 2011 (Italy) =

This is a list of the number-one hits of 2011 on FIMI's Italian Singles and Albums Charts.

Week	Issue date	Song	Artist	Ref	Album	Artist	Ref
1	3 January	"Tutto l'amore che ho"	Jovanotti		Michael	Michael Jackson	
2	10 January	"Tutto l'amore che ho"	Jovanotti		Io e te	Gianna Nannini	
3	17 January	"Rolling in the Deep"	Adele		Io e te	Gianna Nannini	
4	24 January	"Rolling in the Deep"	Adele		Ora	Jovanotti	
5	31 January	"Rolling in the Deep"	Adele		Ora	Jovanotti	
6	7 February	"Eh...già"	Vasco Rossi		Ora	Jovanotti	
7	14 February	"Arriverà"	Modà featuring Emma		Viva i romantici	Modà	
8	21 February	"Arriverà"	Modà featuring Emma		Viva i romantici	Modà	
9	28 February	"Arriverà"	Modà featuring Emma		Viva i romantici	Modà	
10	7 March	"Arriverà"	Modà featuring Emma		Viva i romantici	Modà	
11	14 March	"Arriverà"	Modà featuring Emma		Viva i romantici	Modà	
12	21 March	"On the Floor"	Jennifer Lopez featuring Pitbull		Viva i romantici	Modà	
13	28 March	"On the Floor"	Jennifer Lopez featuring Pitbull		Vivere o niente	Vasco Rossi	
14	4 April	"On the Floor"	Jennifer Lopez featuring Pitbull		Vivere o niente	Vasco Rossi	
15	11 April	"On the Floor"	Jennifer Lopez featuring Pitbull		Vivere o niente	Vasco Rossi	
16	18 April	"Mr. Saxobeat"	Alexandra Stan		Vivere o niente	Vasco Rossi	
17	25 April	"Mr. Saxobeat"	Alexandra Stan		Vivere o niente	Vasco Rossi	
18	2 May	"Mr. Saxobeat"	Alexandra Stan		Vivere o niente	Vasco Rossi	
19	9 May	"Mr. Saxobeat"	Alexandra Stan		Vivere o niente	Vasco Rossi	
20	16 May	"Danza Kuduro"	Don Omar and Lucenzo		Vivere o niente	Vasco Rossi	
21	23 May	"Danza Kuduro"	Don Omar and Lucenzo		Born This Way	Lady Gaga	
22	30 May	"Danza Kuduro"	Don Omar and Lucenzo		Vivere o niente	Vasco Rossi	
23	6 June	"Danza Kuduro"	Don Omar and Lucenzo		Vivere o niente	Vasco Rossi	
24	13 June	"Danza Kuduro"	Don Omar and Lucenzo		Vivere o niente	Vasco Rossi	
25	20 June	"Danza Kuduro"	Don Omar and Lucenzo		Vivere o niente	Vasco Rossi	
26	27 June	"Danza Kuduro"	Don Omar and Lucenzo		Vivere o niente	Vasco Rossi	
27	4 July	"Danza Kuduro"	Don Omar and Lucenzo		Vivere o niente	Vasco Rossi	
28	11 July	"Danza Kuduro"	Don Omar and Lucenzo		Vivere o niente	Vasco Rossi	
29	18 July	"Danza Kuduro"	Don Omar and Lucenzo		Vivere o niente	Vasco Rossi	
30	25 July	"Shimbalaiê"	Maria Gadú		Vivere o niente	Vasco Rossi	
31	1 August	"Shimbalaiê"	Maria Gadú		Back to Black	Amy Winehouse	
32	8 August	"Shimbalaiê"	Maria Gadú		Back to Black	Amy Winehouse	
33	15 August	"Shimbalaiê"	Maria Gadú		Vivere o niente	Vasco Rossi	
34	22 August	"Shimbalaiê"	Maria Gadú		Vivere o niente	Vasco Rossi	
35	29 August	"I soliti"	Vasco Rossi		I'm with You	Red Hot Chili Peppers	
36	5 September	"I soliti"	Vasco Rossi		Dietro le apparenze	Giorgia	
37	12 September	"Benvenuto"	Laura Pausini		Dietro le apparenze	Giorgia	
38	19 September	"Someone Like You"	Adele		Sarò libera	Emma	
39	26 September	"Someone Like You"	Adele		Solo 2.0	Marco Mengoni	
40	3 October	"Someone Like You"	Adele		Decadancing	Ivano Fossati	
41	10 October	"Someone Like You"	Adele		21	Adele	
42	17 October	"Someone Like You"	Adele		21	Adele	
43	24 October	"Someone Like You"	Adele		Mylo Xyloto	Coldplay	
44	31 October	"Someone Like You"	Adele		Mylo Xyloto	Coldplay	
45	7 November	"Someone Like You"	Adele		Inedito	Laura Pausini	
46	14 November	"Someone Like You"	Adele		Inedito	Laura Pausini	
47	21 November	"Someone Like You"	Adele		Campovolo 2.011	Ligabue	
48	28 November	"Someone Like You"	Adele		L'amore è una cosa semplice	Tiziano Ferro	
49	5 December	"Ai se eu te pego!"	Michel Teló		L'amore è una cosa semplice	Tiziano Ferro	
50	12 December	"Ai se eu te pego!"	Michel Teló		Christmas	Michael Bublé	
51	19 December	"Ai se eu te pego!"	Michel Teló		Christmas	Michael Bublé	
52	26 December	"Ai se eu te pego!"	Michel Teló		L'amore è una cosa semplice	Tiziano Ferro	

== See also ==
- 2011 in music
- List of number-one hits in Italy
