= Leandro Manuel Emede =

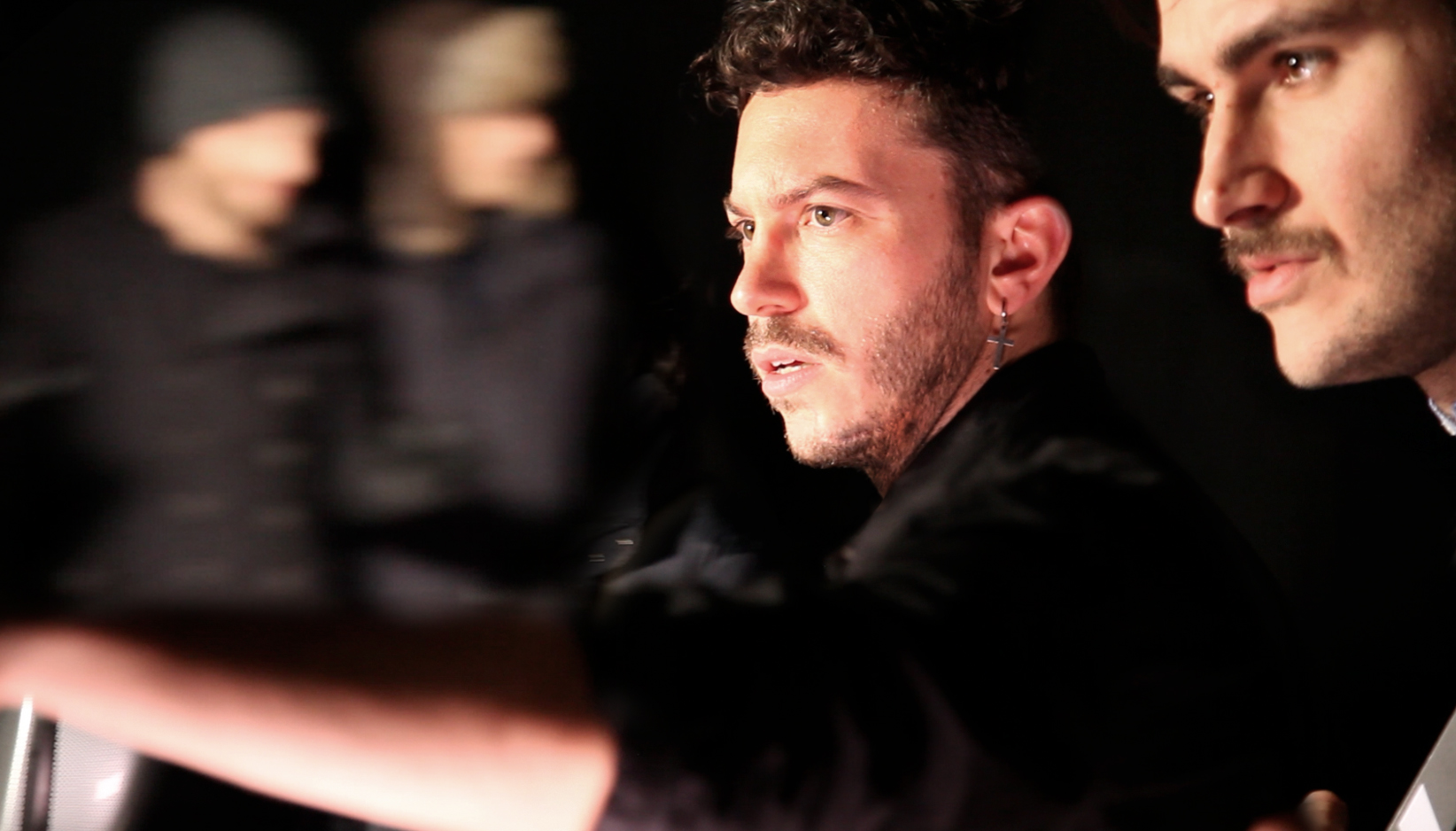
- Leandro Manuel Emede backstage
- Born: Leandro Manuel Emede; August 20, 1980 (age 44); San Isidro, Buenos Aires, Argentina

Leandro Manuel Emede (born 1980 in San Isidro, Buenos Aires Argentina) is a film editor and director.

He studied graphic design and music video production at the University of Southern California, School of Cinematic Arts in Los Angeles.

From 2006 to 2010 he worked as head of the video department at La Sterpia, the Oliviero Toscani studio.

He is the co-founder, with Nicolò Cerioni, of the Milan-based Sugarkane studio. Sugarkane creates music videos, film, live show DVDs, editorials, photographs and fashion videos.

In September 2013 the concert film In Questa Notte Fantastica with Lorenzo Jovanotti, directed by both Leandro Manuel Emede and Nicolo Cerioni, was broadcast in primetime on RAI 1, the first channel of Italian television.

== Filmography ==
=== Director ===
==== Live DVD shows ====
- Lorenzo negli stadi - Backup Tour 2013
- Ora (album Jovanotti)#Seconda edizione 2011
- Inedito

==== Music videos ====
- "Ribcage" - Derek Jameson
- "Keep Up" - Country Black
- "Il più grande spettacolo dopo il Big Bang" - Lorenzo Jovanotti
- "La notte dei desideri" - Lorenzo Jovanotti
- "Fare le valigie" - Luca Carboni
- "Saliva" - Maria Antonietta
- "Davanti agli occhi" - Nesli
- "Quand'ero Giovane" - Franco Battiato
- "Troppo Tempo" - Laura Pausini
- "Ti porto via con me" - Lorenzo Jovanotti
- "Estate" - Lorenzo Jovanotti
- "Raggio di sole" - Lorenzo Jovanotti
- "Se Fué" - Laura Pausini feat. Marc Anthony
- "Similares" - Laura Pausini
- "Dietro un grande amore" - Orietta Berti
- "En la Puerta de al lado / Nella porta accanto" - Laura Pausini
- "A ella debo mi amor" - Laura Pausini
- "Nuestro amor de cada dia" - Laura Pausini

==== Documentaries and films ====
- Anorexia. Storia di un'immagine - with Oliviero Toscani
- Zolfo - with John De Leo
- La Quarta Dimensione - with Lorenzo Jovanotti
- Telesio - with Franco Battiato
- Three days with Monica Bellucci - with Monica Bellucci
- Gucci - Veterans
- Eccentrico - Dolce&Gabbana
- Jovamerican Tour - with Lorenzo Jovanotti
- Forteza Jovanotti - with Lorenzo Jovanotti
- The 20 Greatest Hits - with Laura Pausini

==== Live shows ====
- IN QUESTA NOTTE FANTASTICA - Lorenzo Jovanotti
