= Inedito World Tour =

2011–12 concert tour by Laura Pausini

- Tour by Laura Pausini
- Promotional poster for the tour
- Associated album: Inedito / Inédito
- Start date: 18 December 2011
- End date: 16 August 2012
- Legs: Four
- No. of shows: 63 in Europe; 12 in America; 75 in total

Laura Pausini concert chronology
- LP World Tour (2009); Inedito World Tour (2011–12); The Greatest Hits World Tour (2013–15)

The Inedito World Tour was the sixth world tour by Italian singer Laura Pausini, in support of her eleventh studio album, Inedito / Inédito. It was planned to visit America, Europe, and Australia but ended on 15 September 2012, after Pausini announced she was pregnant. Due to the announcement, the tour was cut short, and plans for a second American leg, a second European leg, and the tour's debut in Australia were cancelled.

== Background information ==
On 30 December 2010, Pausini announced her eleventh studio album, Inedito / Inédito, which was set to be released in both Italian and Spanish on 11 November 2011. The title and tracklist of the album were revealed on Pausini's website on 10 September 2011. The first single from the album, "Benvenuto" / "Bienvenido," was released on 12 September 2011. The album was released on 11 November 2011, after which Pausini embarked on her sixth world tour, starting in Italy during the last two weeks of December. The tour then continued in South America and Europe during the first half of 2012, with plans to return to South America later in 2012.

During the 18 March 2012 show, the music video for the song "Mi Tengo" debuted, playing on the videowall during the performance.

Pausini confirmed that the Spanish-language DVD of the tour was recorded on 20 April 2012 in Madrid.

== About the tour ==
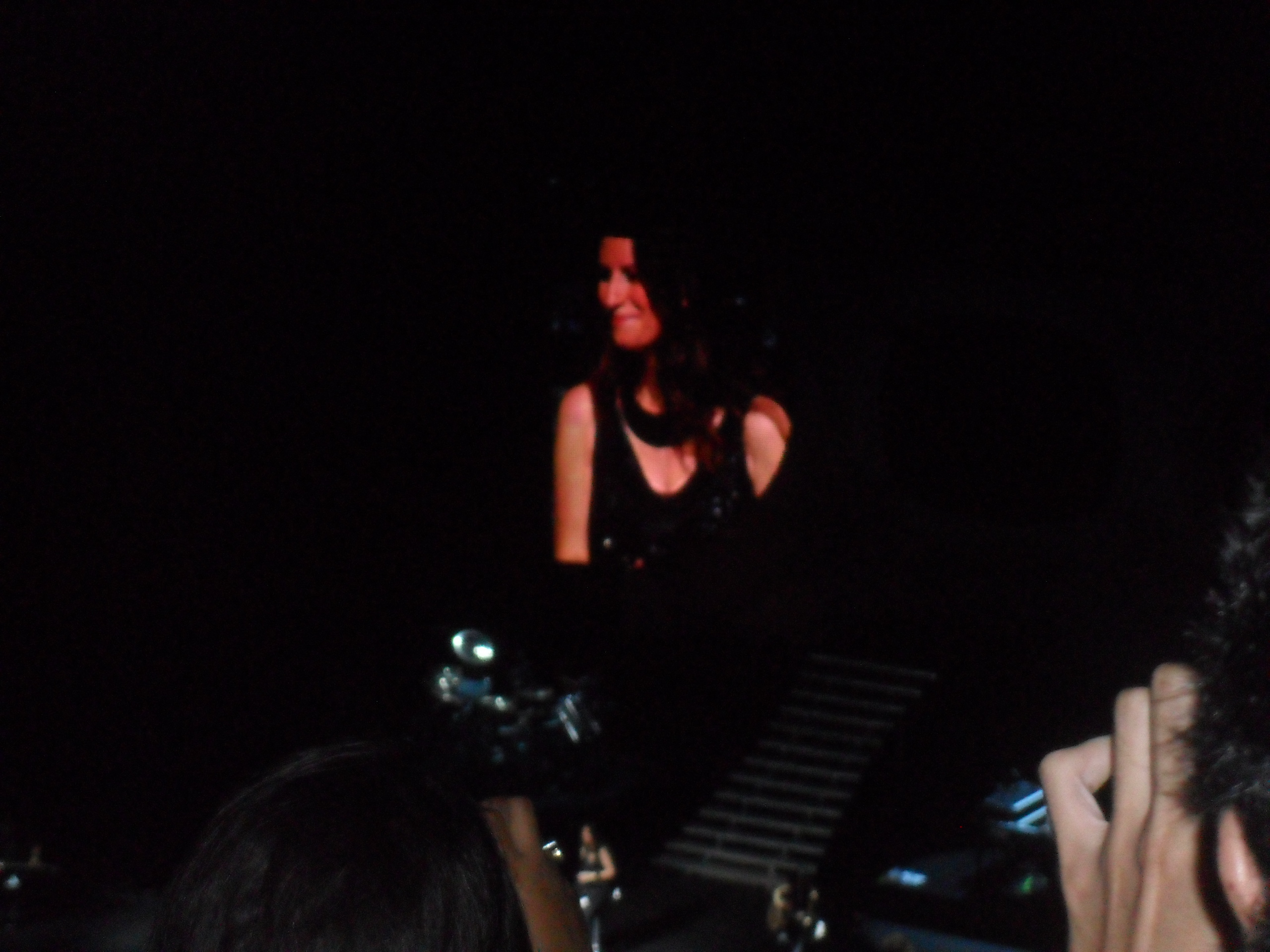
Pausini performing No primeiro olhar for the first time on 21 January show in São Paulo

To promote the album, Pausini embarked on a world tour, starting with 11 shows in Italy in late December 2011. The tour reached South America in January–February 2012, returning to countries like Venezuela, where she had performed only once 14 years earlier during the World Wide Tour in 1997. The European leg of the tour took place from March to May 2012. According to Pausini, it was intended to be one of her largest world tours ever, expected to be more extensive than her previous World Tour 2009.

The stage, where classic Italian production blends with intense rock aggression, changes continuously throughout the concert, with each song highlighted by different effects. For the first time, Laura was accompanied by a dance group consisting of six dancers, performing choreographies by world-renowned choreographer Nikos Lagousakos. The show also featured video projections, special effects never before seen in Italy, and video mapping, making it an exceptional global event and undoubtedly the most sophisticated, poetic, and all-encompassing tour ever staged by an Italian artist. The opening was marked by gold, followed by red for "passion," and then the stage suddenly transformed into an explosion of nature. A starry night served as the backdrop for a 3D moon, bringing the show to a close with a big surprise.

Costumes, accessories, videos, and sets—every single element—were tailor-made for this special occasion by an international team of top-level quality and experience. The collaboration with British architect Mark Fisher, set designer for Pink Floyd and U2, and creator of one-of-a-kind sets for Cirque du Soleil, marked his first-ever contribution to an Italian production. The team also included Patrick Woodroffe, lighting designer for leading pop and rock artists such as Bob Dylan, AC/DC, Depeche Mode, and the Rolling Stones, and who had recently worked on This Is It, Michael Jackson's last, unfinished show.

During the Invece No segment of the show, Pausini is lifted high and sings the song in a manner similar to her performance at the Latin Grammy Awards of 2009, wearing a skirt specially designed for her by the English fashion brand CuteCircuit. Additionally, in Tra te e il mare, a moon is raised above the spectators' heads. In venues with limited stage space, some props were removed; for example, the performances in Brazil featured no lifting, and in Mexico City, there was neither lifting nor the moon.

Currently, all dates up to 14 February 2012 were sold out.

== Broadcast and recordings ==
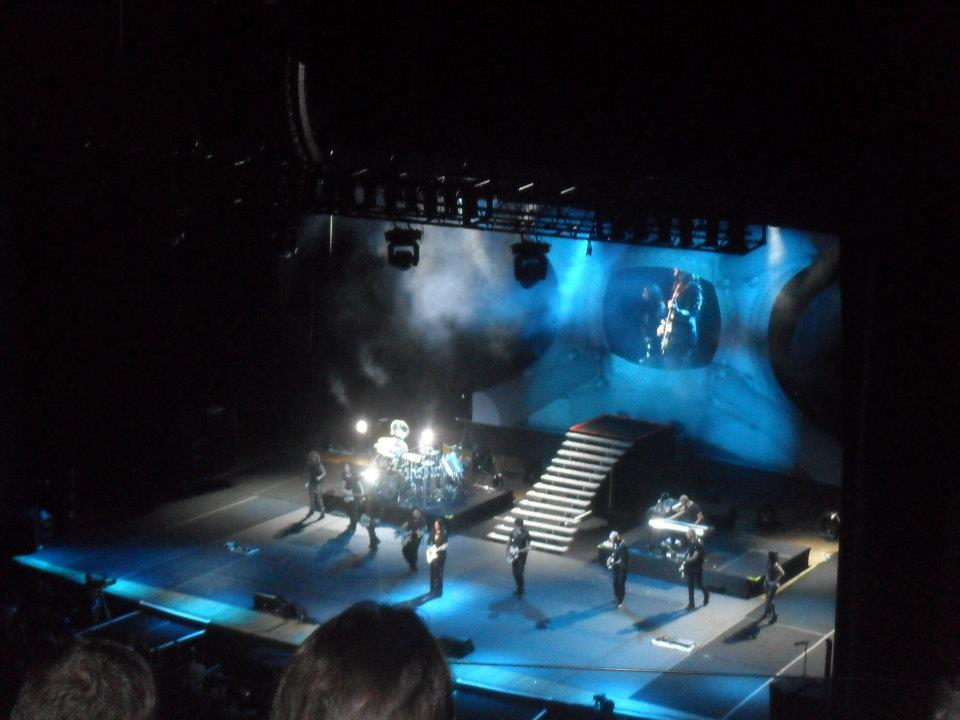
Pausini and her band playing guitars during "Inedito" at the show in São Paulo in January 2012

To promote both the album and the tour, Pausini appeared on many TV shows and performed several of the songs featured in the tour. This included Che tempo che fa, where she sang "Bastava" and "Troppo tempo," as well as the Chiambretti Sunday Show on 9 November 2011.

Pausini recently confirmed that the DVDs in Italian and Spanish were recorded, respectively, in Bologna on 17 April 2012 and in Madrid on 20 April. She also stated that there would not be many concerts during the winter due to her needing to mix and finalize both DVDs. On Pausini's official Facebook page, she confirmed that the DVDs would be released at the end of 2012. On 27 November 2012, the CD+DVD Inedito Special Edition was released in both Spanish and Italian.

On 15 September 2012, alongside the news of her pregnancy, Pausini confirmed that both DVDs would be released on 27 November 2012 and announced that the final single from the album Inedito would be "Celeste."

The bilingual performance of the song "Resta in Ascolto/Escucha Atento," which took place in London during the tour, was recorded professionally. This live audio was included in both versions of the album 20 – The Greatest Hits and its Spanish-language counterpart, 20 – Grandes Exitos, which Pausini released a year after the conclusion of the world tour.

== Accident ==
In March, Laura returned to Italy, starting in Ancona, but the tour was suspended due to an incident that occurred on 5 March 2012 at the PalaCalafiore in Reggio Calabria. Around 2 a.m., a structural failure caused the metal structure above the stage to collapse and fall on several workers who were fixing the aerial lighting at the time. Matthew Armellini, a 31-year-old rigger from Rome, was killed instantly. Two other workers were injured, but their injuries were not serious, and they were transported to nearby hospitals for treatment, suffering various fractures and bruises.

The stage being set up was of medium size, and the structure had been used on previous occasions without any issues. The Prosecutor's Office of Reggio Calabria initiated an investigation and ordered the seizure of the entire structure. After the emergency phase, the fire department began surveying the scene to determine the dynamics and causes of the accident. A similar incident occurred on 12 December 2011 during Jovanotti's Ora 2011–2012 Tour at PalaTrieste in Trieste.

After two weeks of suspension out of respect for the mourning, the tour resumed in Florence and continued to Caserta, Genoa, Turin, Treviso, and Acireale.

== Setlist ==
Italy, France and Brazil
1. Benvenuto
2. Io canto
3. Resta in ascolto
4. Con la musica alla radio
5. Bastava
6. Un'emergenza d'amore
7. Medley passione: Troppo tempo/Il tuo nome in maiuscolo/Casomai/Mi tengo/Il coraggio che non c'è
8. Medley dance: Surrender/Belissimo così
9. No primeiro olhar
10. E ritorno da te
11. Medley first singles: Incancellabile/Strani amori/La solitudine
12. Inedito
13. Primavera in anticipo (It Is My Song)
14. Come se non fosse stato mai amore
15. Le cose che non mi aspetto
16. Non c'è
17. Medley luna: Celeste/La geografia del mio cammino/Nessuno sa/Gente
18. Vivimi
19. Tra te e il mare
20. Invece no
21. La mia banda suona il rock
22. Non ho mai smesso
On n'oublie jamais rien, on vit avec was added to the setlist in France after the song Non c'è.
Latin America
1. Bienvenido
2. Yo Canto
3. Escucha
4. Con La Música En La Radio
5. Bastaba
6. Emergencia De Amor
7. Passion medley: Hace Tiempo/Tu Nombre En Mayúsculas/Menos Mal/Me Quedo/El Valor Que No Se Ve
8. Dance medley: Surrender/Bellísimo Así
9. A Simple Vista
10. Volveré Junto A Ti
11. First Singles medley: Inolvidable/Amores Extraños/La Soledad
12. Inédito
13. Primavera Anticipada (It Is My Song)
14. Como Si No Nos Hubiéramos Amado
15. Dispárame, Dispara
16. Se Fue
17. Moon medley: Celeste/La Geografía De Mi Camino/Quién Lo Sabrá/Gente
18. Víveme
19. Entre Tú Y Mil Mares
20. En Cambio No
21. Y Mi Banda Toca El Rock
22. Jamás Abandoné
Italy – Second Leg
1. Benvenuto
2. Io canto
3. Resta in ascolto
4. Con la musica alla radio
5. Bastava
6. Un'emergenza d'amore
7. Medley Passione: Troppo tempo/Il tuo nome in maiuscolo/Casomai/Volevo dirti che ti amo/Il coraggio che non c'è
8. Medley Dance: Surrender/Belissimo così
9. Nel primo sguardo
10. E ritorno da te
11. Medley Primi Singoli: Incancellabile/Strani amori/La solitudine
12. Inedito
13. Primavera in anticipo (It Is My Song)
14. Come se non fosse stato mai amore
15. Mi tengo
16. Non c'è
17. Medley Luna: Celeste/La geografia del mio cammino/Nessuno sa/Gente
18. Vivimi
19. Tra te e il mare
20. Invece no
21. La mia banda suona il rock
22. Non ho mai smesso
London
1. Benvenuto
2. Resta in ascolto/Escucha atento
3. Bastava
4. Un'emergenza d'amore
5. It's not Goodbye
6. E ritorno da te
7. A Cappela Medley: Inesquecível/Amores extraños/Je chante/La solitudine
8. Inedito
9. Primavera in anticipo (It Is My Song)
10. Come se non fosse stato mai amore/Como si no nos hubieramos amado
11. Non c'è
12. Vivimi/Viveme
13. Tra te e il mare
14. Invece no
15. La mia banda suona il rock/Y mi banda toca el rock
16. Non ho mai smesso
17. Encore:Le cose che vivi/Las cosas que vives
Italy – Summer Leg
1. Benvenuto
2. Io canto
3. Resta in ascolto
4. Con la musica alla radio
5. Bastava
6. Un'emergenza d'amore
7. Medley Passione: Troppo tempo/Il tuo nome in maiuscolo/Casomai/Mi tengo/Il coraggio che non c'è
8. Medley Dance: Surrender/Belissimo così
9. In Assenza di te
10. E ritorno da te
11. Medley Primi Singoli: Incancellabile/Strani amori/La solitudine
12. Inedito
13. Primavera in anticipo (It Is My Song)
14. Come se non fosse stato mai amore
15. Le cose che non mi aspetto
16. Non c'è
17. Medley Luna: Celeste/La geografia del mio cammino/Nessuno sa/Gente
18. Vivimi
19. Tra te e il mare
20. Invece no
21. La mia banda suona il rock
22. Non ho mai smesso
Avo Session Basel
1. Benvenuto
2. Io canto
3. Resta in ascolto
4. Con la musica alla radio
5. Bastava
6. Un'emergenza d'amore
7. Nel primo sguardo
8. E ritorno da te
9. Medley Primi Singoli
  1. Incancellabile/Strani amori/La solitudine
10. Primavera in anticipo (It Is My Song)
11. Come se non fosse stato mai amore
12. Le cose che non mi aspetto
13. Vivimi
14. Tra te e il mare
15. Invece no
16. Non ho mai smesso
RDS Showcase
1. Mi tengo
2. Bastava
3. Resta in ascolto
4. Primavera in anticipo (It Is My Song)
5. Come se non fosse stato mai amore
6. Un'emergenza d'amore
7. E ritorno da te
8. Non ho mai smesso
9. Tra te e il mare
10. Vivimi
11. Benvenuto
12. Io canto

== Tour dates ==
| Date | City | Country | Venue |
Europe
| 18 December 2011 | Rimini | Italy | 105 Stadium |
| 22 December 2011 | Milan | Italy | Mediolanum Forum |
| 23 December 2011 | Milan | Italy | Mediolanum Forum |
| 25 December 2011 | Milan | Italy | Mediolanum Forum |
| 26 December 2011 | Milan | Italy | Mediolanum Forum |
| 28 December 2011 | Milan | Italy | Mediolanum Forum |
| 29 December 2011 | Milan | Italy | Mediolanum Forum |
| 31 December 2011 | Rome | Italy | PalaLottomatica |
| 1 January 2012 | Rome | Italy | PalaLottomatica |
| 3 January 2012 | Rome | Italy | PalaLottomatica |
| 4 January 2012 | Rome | Italy | PalaLottomatica |
| 6 January 2012 | Rome | Italy | PalaLottomatica |
Americas
| 21 January 2012 | São Paulo | Brazil | Credicard Hall |
| 22 January 2012 | São Paulo | Brazil | Credicard Hall |
| 23 January 2012 | São Paulo | Brazil | Credicard Hall |
| 25 January 2012 | Buenos Aires | Argentina | Luna Park |
| 27 January 2012 | Santiago | Chile | Movistar Arena |
| 30 January 2012 | Lima | Peru | Jockey Club |
| 2 February 2012 | Caracas | Venezuela | Terraza del C.C.C.T. |
| 6 February 2012 | Panama City | Panama | Figali Convention Center |
| 8 February 2012 | Santo Domingo | Dominican Republic | Palacio de Deportes |
| 10 February 2012 | Monterrey | Mexico | Arena Monterrey |
| 12 February 2012 | Mexico City | Mexico | Auditorio Nacional |
| 14 February 2012 | Guadalajara | Mexico | Arena VFG |
Europe
| 2 March 2012 | Ancona | Italy | PalaRossini |
| 3 March 2012 | Ancona | Italy | PalaRossini |
| 18 March 2012 | Florence | Italy | Nelson Mandela Forum |
| 19 March 2012 | Florence | Italy | Nelson Mandela Forum |
| 21 March 2012 | Caserta | Italy | PalaMaggiò |
| 22 March 2012 | Caserta | Italy | PalaMaggiò |
| 24 March 2012 | Genoa | Italy | 105 Stadium (Genoa) |
| 25 March 2012 | Genoa | Italy | 105 Stadium (Genoa) |
| 27 March 2012 | Turin | Italy | Torino Palasport Olimpico |
| 28 March 2012 | Turin | Italy | Torino Palasport Olimpico |
| 30 March 2012 | Treviso | Italy | Palaverde |
| 31 March 2012 | Treviso | Italy | Palaverde |
| 2 April 2012 | Treviso | Italy | Palaverde |
| 5 April 2012 | Acireale | Italy | PalaTupparello |
| 6 April 2012 | Acireale | Italy | PalaTupparello |
| 10 April 2012 | Zürich | Switzerland | Hallenstadion |
| 11 April 2012 | Geneva | Switzerland | SEG Geneva Arena |
| 13 April 2012 | Paris | France | Palais Omnisports de Paris-Bercy |
| 14 April 2012 | Brussels | Belgium | Forest National |
| 17 April 2012 | Bologna | Italy | Unipol Arena |
| 20 April 2012 | Madrid | Spain | Palacio de Deportes |
| 21 April 2012 | Barcelona | Spain | Palau Sant Jordi |
| 24 April 2012 | Toulouse | France | Zénith de Toulouse |
| 26 April 2012 | Nice | France | Palais Nikaïa |
| 27 April 2012 | Marseille | France | Le Dôme de Marseille |
| 29 April 2012 | Metz | France | Galaxie Amnéville |
| 30 April 2012 | Strasbourg | France | Zénith de Strasbourg |
| 2 May 2012 | Lyon | France | Halle Tony Garnier |
| 3 May 2012 | Grenoble | France | Palais des Sports de Grenoble |
| 6 May 2012 | Wien | Austria | Wiener Stadthalle |
| 8 May 2012 | Berlin | Germany | O_{2} World |
| 10 May 2012 | Munich | Germany | Circus Krone Building |
| 11 May 2012 | Munich | Germany | Circus Krone Building |
| 13 May 2012 | Stuttgart | Germany | Beethoven-Saal der Liederhalle |
| 15 May 2012 | Düsseldorf | Germany | Mitsubishi Electric Halle |
| 17 May 2012 | Hamburg | Germany | Laeiszhalle |
| 19 May 2012 | Amsterdam | Netherlands | Heineken Music Hall |
| 20 May 2012 | Antwerp | Belgium | Lotto Arena |
| 22 May 2012 | London | United Kingdom | Royal Albert Hall |
| 4 June 2012 | Verona | Italy | Verona Arena |
| 5 June 2012 | Verona | Italy | Verona Arena |
| 6 June 2012 | Verona | Italy | Verona Arena |
| 9 June 2012 | Perugia | Italy | PalaEvangelisti |
| 7 July 2012^{[A]} | Lucca | Italy | Piazza Napoleone |
| 14 July 2012^{[B]} | Locarno | Switzerland | Piazza Grande |
| 18 July 2012 | Bari | Italy | Stadio della Vittoria |
| 21 July 2012 | Palermo | Italy | Velodromo Paolo Borsellino |
| 24 July 2012 | Naples | Italy | Piazza del Plebiscito |
| 1 August 2012 | Ta' Qali | Malta | Malta Fairs and Convention Centre |
| 6 August 2012 | Pescara | Italy | Stadio Adriatico |
| 16 August 2012^{[C]} | Monte Carlo | Monaco | Salle des Étoiles |

Festivals and other miscellaneous performances
^{A} Lucca Summer Festival
^{B} Moon and Stars
^{C} Monte-Carlo Sporting Summer Festival

Cancellations and rescheduled shows

| 4 February 2012 | San José, Costa Rica | Palacio de los Deportes | Cancelled |
| 5 March 2012 | Reggio Calabria, Italy | PalaCalafiore | Cancelled |
| 7 March 2012 | Acireale, Italy | PalaTupparello | Rescheduled to 5 April 2012 |
| 8 March 2012 | Acireale, Italy | PalaTupparello | Rescheduled to 6 April 2012 |
| 11 March 2012 | Bologna, Italy | Unipol Arena | Rescheduled to 17 April 2012 |
| 13 March 2012 | Caserta, Italy | PalaMaggiò | Cancelled |
| 15 March 2012 | Caserta, Italy | PalaMaggiò | Rescheduled to 21 March 2012 |
| 16 March 2012 | Caserta, Italy | PalaMaggiò | Rescheduled to 22 March 2012 |
| 21 March 2012 | Perugia, Italy | PalaEvangelisti | Rescheduled to 9 June 2012 |
| 3 April 2012 | Treviso, Italy | Palaverde | Cancelled |
| 4 August 2012 | Lecce, Italy | Lecce Fiere | Cancelled due to a homicide that happened at the set days before the show |
| 4 December 2012 | Milan, Italy | Mediolanum Forum | Cancelled due to pregnancy |
| 5 December 2012 | Milan, Italy | Mediolanum Forum | Cancelled due to pregnancy |
| 11 December 2012 | Rome, Italy | PalaLottomatica | Cancelled due to pregnancy |
| 15 December 2012 | Rome, Italy | PalaLottomatica | Cancelled due to pregnancy |

=== Box office score data (Billboard) ===
| Venue | City | Tickets sold / Available | Gross revenue |
|---|---|---|---|
| Credicard Hall | São Paulo | 11,475 / 11,736 (98%) | $1,317,550 |
| Auditorio Nacional | Mexico City | 8,598 / 9,520 (90%) | $449,774 |
| Arena VFG | Guadalajara | 9,144 / 9,160 (99%) | $440,741 |
| Hallenstadion | Zurich | 12,499 / 13,000 (96%) | $1,023,170 |
| O_{2} World | Berlin | 4,577 / 4,577 (100%) | $149,059 |
| Lotto Arena | Antwerp | 2,520 / 2,520 (100%) | $137,341 |
| Royal Albert Hall | London | 3,700 / 3,700 (100%) | $198,243 |
| TOTAL | | 52,513 / 56,588 (93%) | $3,715,878 |

== Personnel ==
Band

- Bruno Zucchetti: piano, keyboard
- Paolo Carta: guitar, musical direction
- Nicola Oliva: electric guitar
- Matteo Bassi: electric bass
- Emiliano Bassi: drum

Backing vocalists

- Roberta Granà: backing vocals
- Monica Hill: backing vocals
- Gianluigi Fazio: backing vocals

Dancers

- Stefano Benedetti
- Valentina Beretta
- Bruno Centola
- Santo Giuliano
- Luca Paoloni
- Erika Simonetti
- Tiziana Vitto

Creative direction

- Mark Fisher: stage designer
- Patrick Woodroffe: lighting designer
- Catherine Buyse Dian: costume designer
- Nikos Lagousakos: choreographer
