= Bastava =

- Cover of the Italian version of the song

Single by Laura Pausini

from the album Inedito
- Released: January 20, 2012
- Recorded: Oliveta Recording Studio, Castelbolognese (Ravenna)
- Genre: Pop, latin pop
- Length: 3:33
- Label: Atlantic Records
- Songwriters: Niccolò Agliardi and Massimiliano Pelan
- Producers: Laura Pausini and Paolo Carta

Laura Pausini singles chronology
"Non ho mai smesso" (2011)	"Bastava" (2012)	"Mi tengo" (2012)

Music video
- "Bastava" on YouTube

"Bastava" / "Bastaba" (literally It Was Enough) is a song recorded by Italian singer Laura Pausini, for her eleventh studio album, Inedito. The song was released on radio on January 20, 2012. In France, it is the third single extracted from the album.

The song was written by Niccolò Agliardi to Eleonora Crupi, who was taking part on the fifth edition of the talent show Amici di Maria De Filippi, who was refused to Sanremolab (which opens the doors to the Festival di Sanremo itself) The song was donated later to Pausini and readapted. The song was written by Niccolò Agliardi and Massimiliano Pelan; the Spanish language version was made by Ignacio Ballesteros and produced by Laura Pausini and Paolo Carta.

The song was also recorded in a Spanish-language version, titled "Bastaba" and released as the second single from the Spanish-language version of the album, Inédito.

== Videoclip ==
The videoclip was directed by Gaetano Morbioli and took place in July 2011 in Amsterdam, same city where previous videoclips from Benvenuto and Non ho mai smesso were recorded.

The video was made available on January 26 on the site of the newspaper Corriere della Sera and on January 30 on all musical channels.

The video shows Laura Pausini dressed in a black and white dress, with her hair free, while singing in a very big room, surrounded by a videocamera that moves back and forth her. Scenes from Pausini's private life (such as backstage scenes from her DVD San Siro 2007) are also seen.

== Track list ==
Digital download

1. Bastava
2. Bastaba

== Personnel ==
- Laura Pausini: Voice, composing
- Niccolò Agliardi: composing
- Massimiliano Pelan: composing
- Paolo Carta: composing, electric guitar
- Bruno Zucchetti: musical keyboard, piano
- Matteo Bassi: electric bass
- Emiliano Bassi: drums, percussion
- B.I.M. Orchestra: orchestra

== Live performances ==
On December 26, 2011 Laura Pausini sang Bastava live with Eleonora Crupi at the Mediolanum Forum in Assago, Milano, as part of the Inedito World Tour

== Charts ==
Chart (2012)	Peak position
Italy Airplay (Nielsen Music)	24
Spain Airplay (PROMUSICAE)	50
