= Troppo tempo =

"Troppo Tempo"

Song by Laura Pausini

from the album Inedito
- Released: November 2012
- Recorded: 2011
- Genre: Pop
- Length: 4:05
- Songwriter: Ivano Fossati

Music video
- "Troppo tempo" on YouTube

Music video
- "Hace tiempo" on YouTube

Troppo Tempo (literally Too Much Time in English) is a song recorded by Italian singer Laura Pausini, for her eleventh studio album, Inedito. It was supposed to be the sixth and last single promoting the album, but when Pausini discovered that she was pregnant, she changed her mind to "Celeste", included on the same album. The song features a guitar solo and vocals in the chorus provided by also-Italian singer Ivano Fossati.

The song was written by Ivano Fossati. A Spanish-language version, titled "Hace tiempo" was recorded and included on the Spanish version of "Inedito", "Inédito". It was adapted by Ana Incorvaia.

Both versions of the song were performed during the Inedito World Tour but are not present on the DVD that supports such concerts.

== Videoclip ==
The videoclip was directed by Nicolò Cerioni and Leandro Manuel Emede and took place in a recording studio owned by Sugarkane Studios. Videos were recorded for both Italian and Spanish versions.

It shows Pausini dressed in black, while covered with many accessories bought all over from Europe. During its promotion, it was even regarded as an "almost art installation".

Both videos were released on November 23, 2012 on Pausini's official site and YouTube channel. They are also included on the DVD Inedito Special Edition.

== Personnel ==
Music credits

- Laura Pausini: vocals
- Ivano Fossati: composer, electric guitar solo.
- Celso Valli: arrangements, orchestra conductor, piano, hammond, keyboards.
- Samuele Dessì: acoustic guitars, electric guitars, computer programming.
- Cesare Chiodo: bass.
- Paolo Valli: drums.
- Valentino Corvino: orchestra leader.
- C.V. Ensamble Orchestra: orchestra.

Production credits

- Marco Borsatti: engineer, mixer.
- Celso Valli: producer, mixer.
- Samuele Dessì: engineer.
- Enrico Capalbo: engineer assistant.
