= Mi tengo =

Single by Laura Pausini

from the album Inedito
- Released: March 23, 2012
- Recorded: Oliveta Recording Studio, Castelbolognese (Ravenna)
- Genre: Pop, latin pop
- Length: 3:38
- Label: Atlantic Records
- Songwriters: Laura Pausini, Niccolò Agliardi
- Producer: Paolo Carta

Laura Pausini singles chronology
"Bastava" (2012)	"Mi tengo" (2012)	"Le cose che non mi aspetto" (2012)

"Mi tengo" / "Me quedo" (I keep) is a song recorded by Italian singer Laura Pausini for her studio album Inedito. The song, produced by Paolo Carta, was written by Laura Pausini and Niccolò Agliardi, with the music being composed by Niccolò Agliardi, Matteo Bassi, and Simone Bertolotti.

The song was also recorded in a Spanish-language version, titled "Me quedo", but was not released as a single from the Spanish-language version of the album, Inédito.

The song shows a very mature sense of love, a way to understand how many times the end of a story is the most correct path to take. The separation, while it hurts, leaves in the mind the signs of a past happiness. There are stories that end up without guilt or guilty, but only because it necessarily takes a different route.

== Release ==
In March 2012, Pausini confirmed that the song "Inedito" would not be released as a single due to Gianna Nannini, with whom Pausini shares the vocals, being on vacation and not promoting the song while on tour. Then Pausini asked which song would be the fourth single, with the options being "Troppo tempo" and "Le cose che non mi aspetto". The song was released on March 23, 2012.

== Videoclip ==
The music video for "Mi tengo" was directed by Gianluigi Fazio and Giorgio Fazio. It was recorded in March 2012 and presented for the first time on 18 March 2012 at the Nelson Mandela Forum in Florence during the Inedito World Tour. The video takes place on a simple white background with Pausini and dancers interpreting the lyrics through movement; all the performers, including Pausini, appear with bare backs and shoulders, and at the end of the chorus Pausini holds a paper flower.

== Track list ==
Digital Download:

1. Mi tengo
2. Me quedo

== Credits ==
- Laura Pausini: voice, songwriter
- Celso Valli: piano, keyboards
- Simone Bertolotti: keyboards
- Samuele Dessì: electric guitar, guitar, computer programming
- Cesare Chiodo: bass
- Emiliano Bassi: drums, percussion
- Paolo Valli: drums
- Tommy Ruggero: percussion
- C.V. Ensemble Orchestra: conductor
