= Le cose che non mi aspetto =

Single by Laura Pausini
- Released: 25 May 2012
- Recorded: Oliveta Recording Studio, Castelbolognese (Ravenna)
- Genre: Pop, latin pop
- Length: 3:44
- Label: Atlantic Records
- Songwriters: Laura Pausini, Niccolò Agliardi, Luca Chiaravalli

Laura Pausini singles chronology
"Mi tengo" (2012)	"Le cose che non mi aspetto" (2012)	"Celeste" (2012)

Music video
- "Le cose che non mi aspetto" on YouTube

"Las cosas que no me espero"
- Cover of the Spanish version of the song, featuring Carlos Baute

"Le cose che non mi aspetto" (English: The things that I don't expect) is a song recorded by Italian singer Laura Pausini and produced by Paolo Carta, released in May 2012 as the fifth single from Pausini's 2011 studio album Inedito. The lyrics of the song were written by Laura Pausini and Niccolò Agliardi, while the music was composed by Niccolò Agliardi and Luca Chiaravalli.

The song was also recorded in a Spanish-language version, adapted by Ignacio Ballesteros and titled "Las cosas que no me espero". This version of the song was included in the Hispanic edition of the album, Inédito. "Las cosas que no me espero" was later re-recorded as a duet with Venezuelan singer Carlos Baute for the 2012 special edition of the album. The duet is set to be released in Spain on 30 October 2012.

Both versions of the song were performed during the Inedito World Tour, but as of March 18, 2012, the song was removed from the setlist. Starting to the Summer leg of the Inedito World Tour the song was reintroduced.

Following the release of the DVD Inedito Special Edition on November 27, 2012, Le cose che non mi aspetto was re-released as a single in Europe and Brazil, with Celeste being released in Italy and the duet version of Las cosas que no me espero in the Americas and Spain.

According to Nielsen Music, "Le cose che non mi aspetto" was the 35th most aired song in Italy during 2012.

== Lyrics ==
According to Pausini, the song is a "thank you" to all her fans around the world, who always give her the support she needs to continue

(It) is my declaration of love to those who follow me, respect me, embrace me while not knowing me: my fans, to whom I cannot do anything else than just saying always, thank you. Every time when the curtain opens they make me feel like a happy and fortunate woman. It is an updated version of the song “Le cose che vivi”, that I dedicated years ago to my best friend and audience and that today tells about the relationship I have with people that brought me here, onest and faithful people. Many of them have never left me alone, they haven’t allowed me to feel downhearted or discouraged, they have embraced me without touching me. Sometimes they really do things I never expected, gestures so full of love that earns more than just a song. But this is what I can do and that is why I have decided to give it to them. It’s very little compared to what they are giving me, but I hope they can accept it as a gift from me”.

— Laura Pausini,

== Music video ==
Laura Pausini during the videoclip

The music video for "Le cose che non mi aspetto" was filmed in Berlin on 9 May 2012 by debuting Italian director Salvatore Billeci, a student at the Accademia di Belle Arti in Viterbo.

Billeci commented on the video claiming that he proposed Pausini to adopt "a style with moving graffiti, using the recurrent word 'Grazie' [Italian for 'Thank you'] in several languages, in order to highlight the love and gratitude Laura really feels for all the fans following her all over the world".

The last part of the videoclip shows the word "Casa" (Italian for home) on a wall, with symbols from all the countries Pausini has visited in her career, including the Eiffel Tower in Paris and Christ the Redeemer statue in Rio de Janeiro.

The videoclip was presented for the first time on May 26, 2012, at the Arena di Verona during the Wind Music Awards 2012 award giving and was made disponible on June 13, 2012, on the official site of the newspaper Corriere della Sera and on June 18, 2012, on all musical channels.

== Track listing ==
- Digital download – Italian version
1. "Le cose che non mi aspetto" – 3:45
- Digital download – Spanish version
1. "Las cosas que no me espero" (feat. Carlos Baute) – 3:44

== Charts ==
Chart (2012)	Peak position
Italy (FIMI)	43
Spain (PROMUSICAE)	41
Spain Airplay (PROMUSICAE)	39

== Personnel ==
Music credits

- Niccolò Agliardi – composer
- Emiliano Bassi – drums, percussions
- Matteo Bassi – bass
- Paolo Carta – guitar, computer programming
- Luca Chiaravalli – backing vocals, additional computer programming, composer
- Gianluigi Fazio – backing
- Laura Pausini – vocals, backing vocals, composer
- Bruno Zucchetti – piano, hammond, keyboards, computer programming

Production credits

- Renato Cantele – engineer
- Paolo Carta – producer, arranger, engineer
- Luca Chiaravalli – pre-production
- Nicola Fantozzi – assistant
- Fabrizio Pausini – studio manager
- Laura Pausini – producer

== Release history ==
Region	Date	Version	Format
Italy	25 May 2012	Italian-language solo version	Airplay
Spain	30 October 2012	Spanish-language version with Carlos Baute	Airplay, digital download
