= Celeste (song) =

Single by Laura Pausini

from the album Inedito
- Released: November 5, 2012
- Recorded: Oliveta Recording Studio, Castelbolognese (Ravenna)
- Genre: Pop, latin pop
- Length: 4:03
- Label: Atlantic Records
- Songwriters: Laura Pausini and Beppe Dati

Laura Pausini singles chronology
"Le cose che non mi aspetto" (2012)	"Celeste" (2012)	"Troppo Tempo" (2012)

Music video
- "Celeste" on YouTube

"Celeste" / "Así Celeste" (Blue) is a song recorded by Italian singer Laura Pausini for her studio album Inedito, serving as the album's sixth and last single. The song, produced by Paolo Carta, was written by Laura Pausini and Beppe Dati, with the music being composed by Dati and Goffredo Orlandi.

The song was also recorded in a Spanish-language version, titled "Así Celeste", which was not released as a single outside Italy, Europe and Brazil. Outside the selected countries, Pausini choose a duet version of "Las cosas que no me espero" with Carlos Baute to be the final single.

Pausini confirmed on September 15, 2012, during a fan meeting that she was pregnant, and that originally "Troppo tempo" would be the last single promoting Inedito, but when she discovered her pregnancy she changed her mind to "Celeste.

The song was written by Pausini after many years the press having announced she was pregnant when actually she was not. In her words, the song represents what would she tell her daughter when she was born.

Both versions of the song were performed during the Inedito World Tour.

The single was certified gold by the Federation of the Italian Music Industry for domestic downloads exceeding 15,000 units.

== Videoclip ==
Much alike the previous videoclips from "Inedito", "Celeste" was directed by the same Gaetano Morbioli and recorded in October 2012.

The video takes place on a simple background at Pausini's house, with her in front of a piano. Images of dandelions flying and flowers are shown between shots of Pausini herself. During many parts of the music video Pausini is shown crying. In the end, Pausini giggles at the screen and cleans her face.

== Track list ==
Digital Download:

1. Celeste
2. Así Celeste
3. wiser child Celeste

== Charts ==
Chart (2012)	Peak position
Italy (FIMI)	27
