= Non ho mai smesso =

Single by Laura Pausini

from the album Inedito
- Released: 11 November 2011
- Recorded: Oliveta Recording Studio, Castelbolognese (Ravenna)
- Genre: Pop, latin pop
- Length: 3:24
- Label: Atlantic Records
- Songwriters: Laura Pausini, Niccolò Agliardi
- Producers: Laura Pausini, Paolo Carta

Laura Pausini singles chronology
| "Benvenuto" (2011) | "Non ho mai smesso" (2011) | "Bastava" (2012) |

Music video
- "Non ho mai smesso" on YouTube

Music video
- "Jamás Abandoné" on YouTube

Music video
- "Non ho mai smesso" flashmob on YouTube

"Non ho mai smesso" (English: I never abandoned) is a song recorded by Italian singer Laura Pausini for her studio album Inedito. The song, produced by Paolo Carta and Laura Pausini, was written by Laura Pausini and Niccolò Agliardi. It was released in Italy on 11 November 2011, as the second single from the album.

The song was also recorded in a Spanish-language version, titled "Jamás abandoné". This version of the song, whose lyrics were adapted by Badia, was released in Latin America as the second single from the Spanish-language version of the album, Inédito.

In May 2012, it was certified gold by the Federation of the Italian Music Industry for domestic sales exceeding 15,000 units. In December 2012, the music video for "Jamás abandoné", directed by Gaetano Morbioli, received a nomination for Music Video of the Year at the Lo Nuestro Awards 2013.

== Composition and background ==
The song describes Pausini's willing to return to perform live after the break that preceded the release of Inedito. In the lyrics of the song, dedicated to Pausini's relationship with her job, she claims that she has never quit loving music.

During an interview following the release of the album, Pausini revealed that the song was chosen by her label as the first single from the album, but she personally decided to release "Benvenuto" as the lead track from Inedito, explaining that she wanted to release a more optimistic and less melancholic song.

== Live performances ==
The song was first performed on 10 November 2011 in Piazza del Duomo, Milan, during a flash mob organized to promote the album Inedito, which was released on the following day. Pausini was accompanied by a cHoreography performed by approximately a hundred of dancers.

Pausini performed the song during her Inedito World Tour. The song was also performed during the first episode of the Chiambretti Muzic Show, broadcast by Italia 1 on 11 November 2011 and entirely dedicated to Laura Pausini. On 16 February 2012, Pausini performed the Spanish-language version of the song during the award ceremony of the Premio Lo Nuestro 2012, held at the American Airlines Arena in Miami, Florida. Her performance was dedicated to the memory of Whitney Houston, died five days before.

== Music video ==
The music video for the song was directed by Gaetano Morbioli and filmed in Amsterdam at the end of July 2011, where Pausini and Morbioli also shot the video for the previous single "Benvenuto".

The main idea of the video consists of showing several paradoxes by images. Some scenes of the clip are feature women wearing elegant dresses and athletic shoes while they compete at an all-weather running track. A distinct man wearing a suit is then shown while he crosses the road carrying a surfboard, while a female swimmer which looks ready to dive is later filmed while she leans down from a roof instead of a trampoline.

Before sailing on a boat, Pausini appears in the video wearing a red dress by Roberto Cavalli while she sIts on the floor, tied to a parachute.

The music video was first released on the website of Italian newspaper Corriere della Sera on 11 November 2011. The "Making of the video" was later released on Pausini's official YouTube channel, but it was not featured on any audio-video support.

== Track listing ==
Digital download (Italian-language version)

1. "Non ho mai smesso" – 3:24

Digital download (Spanish-language version)

1. "Jamás abandoné" – 3:24

== Personnel ==
Music credits

- Prisca Amori – orchestra leader
- Niccolò Agliardi – composer
- B.I.M. Orchestra – orchestra
- Paolo Carta – composer, electric guitar, computer programming, arrangements
- Nathan East – electric bass
- Steve Ferrone – drums
- Laura Pausini – vocals, composer
- Giuseppe Tortora – orchestra contractor
- Paolo Zampini – flute
- Bruno Zucchetti – keyboards, piano

Production credits

- Riccardo Benini – executive producer
- Renato Cantele – engineer
- Paolo Carta – producer, engineer
- Nicola Fantozzi – assistant
- Marco Nuzzi – executive producer
- Davide Palmiotto – assistant
- Fabrizio Pausini – studio manager
- Laura Pausini – producer

== Charts ==
| Chart (2011–2013) | Peak position |
|---|---|
| Belgium (Ultratip Bubbling Under Wallonia) | 23 |
| Italy (FIMI) | 15 |
| Italy Airplay (Nielsen Music) | 22 |
| US Latin Pop (Billboard) | 33 |
| US World Digital Songs (Billboard) | 7 |

== Release history ==
| Region | Date | Format | Label |
|---|---|---|---|
| Italy | 11 November 2011 | Airplay | Atlantic Records, Warner Music Italy |
| United States | 16 January 2012 | Airplay | Atlantic Records |
| Puerto Rico | 16 January 2012 | Airplay | Atlantic Records |
