= Inedito =

Inedito/Inédito
- Italian-language edition

Studio album by Laura Pausini
- Released: 11 November 2011
- Recorded: July 2011
- Genre: Latin pop
- Length: 51:29
- Languages: Italian, Spanish, Portuguese
- Labels: Atlantic, Warner Music Group
- Producers: Paolo Carta, Laura Pausini, Celso Valli, Corrado Rustici, Daniel Vuletic, Simone Bertolotti

Laura Pausini chronology
Laura Live World Tour 09/Laura Live Gira Mundial 09 (2009)	Inedito/Inédito (2011)	20 – The Greatest Hits/20 – Grandes Exitos (2013)

Singles from Inedito/Inédito
- 1. "Benvenuto" Released: September 12, 2011; 2. "Non ho mai smesso" Released: 11 November 2011; 3. "Bastava" Released: 20 January 2012; 4. "Mi tengo" Released: 23 March 2012; 5. "Le cose che non mi aspetto" Released: 25 May 2012; 6. "Celeste" Released: 5 November 2012 (in selected countries); 7. "Las cosas que no me espero" Released: 30 October 2012 (in selected countries)

Professional ratings
Review scores
Source	Rating
AllMusic	3/5 stars

Inedito and Inédito (English: All New or Unpublished) are the eleventh studio albums by Italian singer Laura Pausini, released by Atlantic Records on 11 November 2011. This is Pausini's comeback album, after two years of silence. The name of the album was confirmed on the dawn of September 10, 2011. The album was previewed with the release of the single "Benvenuto", which debuted at number one on the Italian Singles Chart. The second single from the album was "Non ho mai smesso", followed by "Bastava", released on January 20, 2012.

In December 2011, Pausini embarked on the Inedito World Tour to promote the album, first in Italy, then coming to Latin America. In March 2012 Pausini returned to Italy, then she continued with a European leg until August 2012. A return to Latin America, North America and Australia was planned and the tour was originally going to end in December 2012 with a new set of concerts in Italy, but on 15 September 2012 Pausini announced her pregnancy and cancelled the remaining shows of the tour. The album has sold 1,000,000 copies worldwide.

== Background ==
After announcing in late 2009 that she would have been out of the spotlight for two years, Pausini broke her silence in early January 2011, when her website reported that Pausini's eleventh studio album would be released in late 2011.

Starting from 11 January 2011, Pausini's website was monthly renewed, adding information about her new studio album and the Inedito World Tour. On 10 September 2011, Pausini revealed the artwork and the track list of her album. The following day, the first single from Inedito, "Benvenuto", was made available in streaming through Pausini's official website. The song was officially released on 12 September 2011.

On 9 November 2011, via her official Facebook page, Pausini confirmed "Non ho mai smesso", released in Italy on 11 November, as the second single from the album.

In March 2012, Pausini announced that the title song, "Inedito", would not be ever released as a single, since the co-singer of that song, Gianna Nannini, was currently on vacation and did not promote it. Thus, "Mi tengo" was released as the fourth single, on 23 March 2012.

In May 2012, Pausini announced that the fifth single from the album would be "Le cose che non-mi aspetto", which was released on 25 May 2012.

The last single from the album is going to be "Celeste" (in Italy) and "Las cosas que no me espero" (in Spain and Latin America, featuring Carlos Baute), both to be released on 5 November 2012. Originally, "Troppo tempo" was going to be chosen as the last single (with its music video already been recorded), but when Pausini discovered she was pregnant she changed her mind and chose such song.

== Writing, composition and recording ==
In October 2011, during a promotional tour in Mexico, Pausini explained that the title Inedito refers to the creative process of the album, described as very different from the one that led to her previous studio sets, because for the first time she conceived and wrote the whole album without any pressure, in the privacy of her home, instead of working on it in airports and hotel rooms.

Describing the musical style of the album, Pausini claimed that it will include songs with a wide range of influences:

"It's a complete album from the musical point of view, because there are a lot of differences between each song. It is influenced by rock, but it also features ballads and melodies with music by Italian and English orchestras."

The album features guest appearances by Italian singer-songwriters Gianna Nannini, with whom Pausini duets in the title-track, and Ivano Fossati, who performs a guitar solo in "Troppo tempo" / "Hace tiempo".

The track "Tutto non-fa te" / "Lo que tú me das" is dedicated to Pausini's mother, while "Nel primo sguardo" / "A simple vista" was written by Pausini thinking about her younger sister, Silvia, with whom she duets in the Italian version of the song.

"Nel primo sguardo" is by far the only song ever released and recorded by Pausini in four different languages: Spanish, Italian, Portuguese and French. A 10-second snippet of an English version of the song was sung live by Pausini during a press conference. Also, after the album was released, during a radio broadcast, Pausini sang a snippet of an English version of "Celeste". Later it was confirmed that "Nel primo sguardo" was first written in English, under the name Beautiful, but Pausini did not find words for the chorus at first. Then, when her friend Carolina Leal translated the original version into Portuguese, Pausini knew the song would be good.

The track "Ti dico ciao" / "Te digo adiós" is dedicated to Pausini's late friend, Giuseppe. Indeed, she planted a tree in front of her house, alluding to the lyrics of the song.

The track "Celeste" / "Así Celeste" was written by Pausini after, on many occasions, the media constantly said she was pregnant, when indeed she was not. As declared by herself, the song's lyrics is exactly what she would say to her baby when she actually has one.

== Promotion ==
On 11 November 2011, Pausini promoted her album appearing on the first episode of the new TV show by Italian presenter Piero Chiambretti, the Chiambretti Muzic Show, during which she sang a few tracks from Inedito.

The tour to promote the album started on 22 December 2011 from Milan. The Inedito World Tour will reach Latin America in January and February 2012. In March 2012, Pausini will be back in Italy for a second Italian leg of the tour, while in April and May she will give concerts throughout the rest of Europe.

== Track listing ==
=== Inedito ===
Standard edition
No.	Title	Lyrics	Music	Producer(s)	Length
1.	"Benvenuto"	Laura Pausini, Niccolò Agliardi	Pausini, Paolo Carta	Pausini, Carta	3:56
2.	"Non ho mai smesso"	Pausini, Agliardi	Pausini, Carta	Pausini, Carta	3:23
3.	"Bastava"	Pausini, Agliardi	Agliardi, Massimiliano Pelan	Pausini, Carta	3:32
4.	"Le cose che non mi aspetto"	Pausini, Agliardi	Agliardi, Luca Chiaravalli	Pausini, Carta	3:44
5.	"Troppo Tempo" (feat. Ivano Fossati)	Ivano Fossati	Fossati	Celso Valli	4:04
6.	"Mi tengo"	Pausini, Agliardi	Agliardi, Matteo Bassi, Simone Bertolotti	Valli	3:38
7.	"Ognuno ha la sua matita"	Pausini, Cheope	Daniel Vuletic	Corrado Rustici	3:44
8.	"Inedito" (duet with Gianna Nannini)	Pausini, Cheope	Vuletic	Corrado Rustici	3:11
9.	"Come vivi senza me"	Pausini, Cheope	Vuletic	Pausini, Vuletic	3:22
10.	"Nel primo sguardo" (duet with Silvia Pausini)	Pausini, Niccolò Fabi	Pausini, Carta	Pausini, Carta	4:33
11.	"Nessuno sa"	Pausini, Agliardi	Carta	Pausini, Carta	3:06
12.	"Celeste"	Pausini, Beppe Dati	Dati, Goffredo Orlandi	Valli	4:01
13.	"Tutto non fa te"	Pausini, Agliardi	Agliardi, Bertolotti, Chiaravalli	Pausini, Bertolotti	4:00
14.	"Ti dico ciao"	Pausini, Cheope	Vuletic	Pausini, Vuletic	3:15

Bonus track (digital download)
No.	Title	Lyrics	Music	Producer(s)	Length
15.	"A simple vista"	Pausini, Niccolò Fabi, Incorvaia	Pausini, Carta	Pausini, Carta	4:34

Brazilian edition bonus track
No.	Title	Lyrics	Music	Producer(s)	Length
15.	"No primeiro olhar" (Nel primo sguardo)	Pausini, Niccolò Fabi, Carolina Leal	Pausini, Carta	Pausini, Carta	4:34

=== Inédito ===
Standard edition
No.	Title	Lyrics	Music	Adaptation	Length
1.	"Bienvenido"	Laura Pausini, Niccolò Agliardi	Pausini, Paolo Carta	Jorge Ballesteros	3:55
2.	"Jamás abandoné"	Pausini, Agliardi	Pausini, Carta	J. Ballesteros	3:23
3.	"Bastaba"	Pausini, Agliardi	Agliardi, Massimiliano Pelan	Ignacio Ballesteros	3:32
4.	"Las cosas que no me espero"	Pausini, Agliardi	Agliardi, Luca Chiaravalli	I. Ballesteros	3:44
5.	"Hace tiempo" (feat. Ivano Fossati)	Ivano Fossati	Fossati	Ana Incorvaia	4:04
6.	"Me quedo"	Pausini, Agliardi	Agliardi, Matteo Bassi, Simone Bertolotti	Incorvaia	3:38
7.	"Cada uno juega su partida"	Pausini, Cheope	Daniel Vuletic	I. Ballesteros	3:44
8.	"Inédito (Lo exacto opuesto de ti)" (duet with Gianna Nannini)	Pausini, Cheope	Vuletic	J. Ballesteros	3:11
9.	"Como vives tú sin mi"	Pausini, Cheope	Vuletic	I. Ballesteros	3:22
10.	"A simple vista"	Pausini, Niccolò Fabi	Pausini, Carta	J. Ballesteros	4:33
11.	"Quién lo sabrá"	Pausini, Agliardi	Carta	I. Ballesteros	3:06
12.	"Así celeste"	Pausini, Beppe Dati	Dati, Goffredo Orlandi	J. Ballesteros	4:01
13.	"Lo que tú me das"	Pausini, Agliardi	Agliardi, Bertolotti, Chiaravalli	I. Ballesteros	4:00
14.	"Te digo adiós"	Pausini, Cheope	Vuletic	J. Ballesteros	3:15

=== Deluxe version ===
The deluxe edition of Inedito includes both the Italian-language and the Spanish-language versions of the album, and also features 5 additional tracks:

Bonus tracks contained in the deluxe version – CD 1 (Italian-language version)
No.	Title	Lyrics	Music	Producer(s)	Length
15.	"Inedito" (solo version)	Pausini, Cheope	Vuletic	Corrado Rustici	3:12
16.	"Nel primo sguardo" (solo version)	Pausini, Fabi	Pausini, Carta	Pausini, Carta	4:34
17.	"Dans le premier regard" (French version of 'Nel primo sguardo')	Pausini, Fabi, Ana Incorvaia	Pausini, Carta	Pausini, Carta	4:38

Bonus tracks contained in the deluxe version – CD 2 (Spanish-language version)
No.	Title	Lyrics	Music	Producer(s)	Length
15.	"Inédito (Lo exacto opuesto de ti)" (solo version)	Pausini, Cheope, J. Ballesteros	Vuletic	Rustici	3:12
16.	"No primeiro olhar" (Nel primo sguardo)	Pausini, Fabi, Leal	Pausini, Carta	Pausini, Carta	4:38

=== Special edition ===
The special editions of Inedito and Inédito contain the two original CDs plus a live bonus track recorded on 31 December 2011 and a live DVD of the Inedito World Tour.

Bonus track of the Italian special edition – CD 1
No.	Title	Length
15.	"Medley New Year's Eve (live)"	20:15

Inedito special edition – DVD Live Inedito World Tour
No.	Title	Writer(s)	Length
1.	"Benvenuto"	Pausini, Agliardi, Carta	5:05
2.	"Io canto"	Marco Luberti, Riccardo Cocciante	3:51
3.	"Con la musica alla radio"	Pausini, Cheope, Vuletic	5:27
4.	"Bastava"	Pausini, Agliardi, Pelan	4:35
5.	"Medley Dance: Surrender / Bellissimo così"	Dane de Viller, Sean Hosein, Steven Smith, Anthony Anderson / Pausini, Cheope, Federica Camba, Daniele Coro	6:38
6.	"Nel primo sguardo"	Pausini, Fabi, Carta	6:26
7.	"Inedito Guitar War"	-	2:34
8.	"Inedito"	Pausini, Cheope, Vuletic	5:07
9.	"Primavera in anticipo (It is my song)"	Pausini, Cheope, James Blunt, Vuletic	5:04
10.	"Come se non fosse stato mai amore"	Pausini, Cheope, Vuletic	3:56
11.	"Non c'è"	Federico Cavalli, Angelo Valsiglio, Pietro Cremonesi	5:23
12.	"Intro "Father's Eye""	-	2:03
13.	"Medley Luna: Celeste / La geografia del mio cammino / Nessuno sa / Gente"	Pausini, Dati, Orlandi / Pausini, Cheope, Agliardi, Carta / Pausini, Agliardi, Carta / Cheope, Marati, Valsiglio	8:39
14.	"Invece no"	Pausini, Agliardi, Carta	4:18
15.	"La mia banda suona il rock"	Ivano Fossati	5:08
16.	"Non ho mai smesso"	Pausini, Agliardi, Carta	10:52

Bonus track of the Spanish special edition – CD 1
No.	Title	Length
15.	"Medley New Year's Eve" (live)	20:15

Inedito special edition CD2 – DVD Live Inedito World Tour
No.	Title	Writer(s)	Spanish adaptation	Length
1.	"Bienvenido"	Pausini, Agliardi, Carta	J. Ballesteros	5:05
2.	"Yo canto"	Luberti, Cocciante	Frank Andrada	3:51
3.	"Con la música en la radio"	Pausini, Cheope, Vuletic	I. Ballesteros	5:27
4.	"Bastaba"	Pausini, Agliardi, Pelan	I. Ballesteros	4:35
5.	"Medley Dance: Surrender / Bellissimo così"	Dane de Viller, Sean Hosein, Steven Smith, Anthony Anderson / Pausini, Cheope, Federica Camba, Daniele Coro		6:38
6.	"A simple vista"	Pausini, Fabi, Carta	J. Ballesteros	6:26
7.	"Inedito Guitar War"			2:34
8.	"Inédito (Lo exacto opuesto de ti)"	Pausini, Cheope, Vuletic	J. Ballesteros	5:07
9.	"Primavera anticipada (It is my song)"	Pausini, Cheope, Blunt, Vuletic	I. Ballesteros	5:04
10.	"Como si no nos hubiéramos amado"	Pausini, Cheope, Vuletic	León Tristán	3:56
11.	"Se fue"	Federico Cavalli, Angelo Valsiglio, Pietro Cremonesi	Badia	5:23
12.	"Intro "Father's Eye""			2:03
13.	"Medley Luna: Celeste / La geografia del mio cammino / Nessuno sa / Gente"	Pausini, Dati, Orlandi / Pausini, Cheope, Agliardi, Carta / Pausini, Agliardi, Carta / Cheope, Marati, Valsiglio		8:39
14.	"Invece no"	Pausini, Agliardi, Carta		4:18
15.	"Y mi banda toca el rock"	Fossati	Hidalgo	5:08
16.	"Jamás abandoné"	Pausini, Agliardi, Carta	J. Ballesteros	10:52

== Personnel ==
Credits adapted from Inedito's liner notes.

Production credits

- Massimo Aluzzi – engineer
- Marco Barusso – engineer
- Simone Bertolotti – producer
- Marco Borsatti – engineer, mixing
- Andy Bradfield – mixing
- Jason Carmer – engineer
- Renato Cantele – engineer, mixing
- Enrico Capalbo – assistant
- Paolo Carta – engineer, producer
- Luca Chiaravalli – pre-production
- Fiona Cruickshank – Pro Tools
- Luigi De Maio – engineer
- Samuele Dessì – engineer
- Nicola Fantozzi – engineer, assistant
- Mo Hausler – assistant
- Jake Jackson – engineer
- Davide Palmiotto – assistant
- Angelo Paracchini – assistant
- Laura Pausini – producer
- Corrado Rustici – producer
- Giuseppe Salvadori – assistant
- Celso Valli – mixing, producer
- Daniel Vuletic – pre-production, producer

Music credits

- Leo Abrahams – guitar
- Niccolò Agliardi – backing vocals, composer
- Prisca Amori – orchestra leader
- Dave Arch – piano
- B.I.M. Orchestra – orchestra
- Emiliano Bassi – drums, percussions
- Matteo Bassi – bass, composer
- Simone Bertolotti – additional keyboards, piano, Rhodes piano, glockenspiel, composer, arrangements, orchestra conductor
- C.V. Ensamble orchestra – orchestra
- Paolo Carta – guitar, computer programming, harmonica, backing vocals, composer, arrangements, orchestra conductor
- Luca Chiaravalli – backing vocals, additional computer programming, composer
- Cesare Chiodo – bass
- Valentino Corvino – leader
- Beppe Dati – composer
- Edoardo De Angelis – orchestra leader
- Samuele Dessì – acoustic guitar, electric guitar, computer programming
- Nathan East – bass
- Niccolò Fabi – composer
- Gianluigi Fazio – backing vocals
- Steve Ferrone – drums, percussions
- Ivano Fossati – electric guitar, vocals
- Elvezio Fortunato – electric guitar
- Marzia Gonzo – backing vocals
- Nick Ingman – arrangements, orchestra conductor
- Frank Martin – piano
- Gianna Nannini – vocals
- Everton Nelson – orchestra leader
- Andy Pask – bass
- Nicola Oliva – acoustic guitar
- Orchestra Edodea Ensemble – orchestra
- Goffredo Orlandi – composer
- Laura Pausini – vocals, composer, backing vocals
- Silvia Pausini – vocals
- Massimiliano Pelan – composer
- Kaveh Rastegar – bass
- Andrea Rigonat – electric guitar
- Royal Philharmonic Orchestra – orchestra
- Tommy Ruggero – percussion
- Corrado Rustici – guitar, keyboards, treatments, beats, arrangements, orchestra conductor
- Rosaria Sindona – backing vocals
- Solis String Quartet – orchestra
- Ian Thomas – drums
- Giuseppe Tortora – contractor
- Michael Urbano – drums
- Celso Valli – piano, Hammond organ, keyboards, armonium, orchestra conductor
- Paolo Valli – drums, arrangements
- Massimo Varini – acoustic guitar, electric guitar
- Daniel Vuletic – composer, arrangements
- Paolo Zampini – flute
- Bruno Zucchetti – piano, Hammond organ, keyboards, computer programming

== Charts ==
=== Weekly charts ===
Chart (2011)	Peak position
Argentine Albums (CAPIF)	3
Austrian Albums (Ö3 Austria)	59
Belgian Albums (Ultratop Flanders)	73
Belgian Albums (Ultratop Wallonia)	13
Croatian International Albums (HDU)	10
Dutch Albums (Album Top 100)	30
French Albums (SNEP)	63
German Albums (Offizielle Top 100)	47
Italian Albums (FIMI)	1
Mexican Albums (Top 100 Mexico)	11
Spanish Albums (Promusicae)	4
Swiss Albums (Schweizer Hitparade)	2
Swedish Albums (Sverigetopplistan)	43
US Latin Pop Albums (Billboard)	7
US Top Latin Albums (Billboard)	17
US World Albums (Billboard)	3

=== Year-end charts ===
Chart (2011)	Position
Italian Albums Chart	5
Swiss Albums Chart	47
Chart (2012)	Position
Italian Albums Chart	9
Swiss Albums Chart	69

== Certifications and sales ==
Region	Certification	Certified units/sales
Brazil (Pro-Música Brasil)	Platinum	40,000^{*}
Italy (FIMI)	6× Platinum	360,000^{*}
Mexico (AMPROFON)	Gold	30,000^{^}
Switzerland (IFPI Switzerland)	Gold	10,000^{^}
^{*} Sales figures based on certification alone.^{^} Shipments figures based on certification alone.

== Release history ==
Region	Release date	Format	Edition	Label
Italy	11 November 2011	CD, digital download	Deluxe Version	Atlantic
Italy	11 November 2011	CD, digital download	Italian-language version	Atlantic
France	11 November 2011	CD, digital download	Italian-language version	Atlantic
Spain	11 November 2011	Digital download	Spanish-language version, Deluxe version	Atlantic
Spain	15 November 2011	CD	Spanish-language version, Deluxe version	Atlantic
United States	15 November 2011	CD, digital download	Spanish-language version	Warner Music Latina
Mexico	15 November 2011	CD, digital download	Spanish-language version	Warner Music Latina
Brazil	17 November 2011	CD	Special Brazilian version	Warner Music Brazil
