= Benvenuto (song) =

Single by Laura Pausini

from the album Inedito
- Released: 12 September 2011
- Recorded: Oliveta Recording Studio, Castelbolognese (Ravenna)
- Genre: Pop, latin pop
- Length: 3:56
- Label: Atlantic Records
- Songwriters: Laura Pausini, Niccolò Agliardi, Paolo Carta
- Producer: Paolo Carta

Laura Pausini singles chronology
"Donna d'Onna" (2010)	"Benvenuto" (2011)	"Non ho mai smesso" (2011)

Music video
- "Benvenuto" on YouTube

"Benvenuto" [beɱveˈnuːto] / "Bienvenido" [bjembeˈniðo] (Welcome) is a song recorded by Italian singer Laura Pausini for her studio album Inedito. The song, produced by Paolo Carta, was written by Laura Pausini, Niccolò Agliardi and Paolo Carta. On 12 September 2011, it was released to mainstream radios and it became digitally available as the lead single of the album.

It debuted at number one on the Italian Singles Chart and it was later certified platinum by the Federation of the Italian Music Industry.

The song was also recorded in a Spanish-language version, titled "Bienvenido" and released as the first single from the Spanish-language version of the album, Inédito. The music video for this version of the song received a nomination for Video of the Year at the Premio Lo Nuestro 2012, held on 16 February 2012.

== Release ==
Laura Pausini revealed the title and the artwork of the single through her official website on 11 August 2011. On 10 September 2011, the lyrics of the song were released, together with a preview of the song.

The full version of the song was published on Pausini's website on 11 September 2011. On 12 September 2011, the song was worldwide released as a digital single and it was first aired by Italian mainstream radios. In Italy, the single was also released in its Spanish-language version.

During an interview following the release of the album Inedito, Pausini revealed that "Non ho mai smesso" was chosen by her label as the first single from the album, but she personally decided to release "Benvenuto" as the lead track from Inedito, explaining that she wanted to release a more optimistic and less melancholic song. "Non ho mai smesso" was later released as the second single from the album.

== Composition ==
=== Song structure ===
Each verse of the song is followed with the chorus, giving the track a simple and traditional structure. Together with the immediacy of its lyrics, this transformed "Benvenuto" in a radio-friendly song, in the style of some of the latest Pausini's hits.

The arrangement of the song is characterized by a drum-based incipit, followed by piano and then by Laura's voice. After the release of the single, some fans claimed that the intro was plagiarised from Frida Lyngstad's 1982 song "I Know There's Something Going On". However, Pausini later explained that, despite not being a sample, the intro of "Benvenuto" is an explicit tribute to Phil Collins, who produced Frida's single and played the drums in it.

"I heard that he [Phil Collins] was going to retire from making music while I was with him for a concert in Geneva, so, together with my staff, during the same night we decided to pay a tribute to him with this drum-based intro."

According to Allmusic's Jon O'Brien, "Benvenuto" is "one of the most anthemic tracks she's put her name to thanks to its clattering drums and soaring melodic chorus".

=== Lyrical theme ===
Containing a few reference to current events, the single is an anthem to the future, written with the aim to inject courage and optimism to the listeners, despite the worldwide economic crisis that began in the late 2000s.

The track is dedicated to the most authentic things and people, and wants to encourage them not to be afraid of being themselves. Some lines of the song also refer to Pausini's private life.

== Music video ==
The music video for "Benvenuto", directed by Gaetano Morbioli, was released on 27 September 2011.

It was filmed at different locations in Amsterdam during late July 2011, and the shooting of the video was interrupted by paparazzi. The music video was released on September 28, 2011 on Warner Music's YouTube account.

Pausini, who plays the main character of the video, wears hippy-style clothes by Roberto Cavalli. Gaetano Morbioli declared about the video:

"We reconstructed a situation that somehow evokes the big gatherings of a few years ago, a sort of modern-day Woodstock. The music video shows a journey to a magic place, in which a unique concert will be staged."

== Commercial performance ==
The song debuted at number one on the Italian official Top Digital Download Chart. The following week, the single dropped at number 6. It later completed a nine non-consecutive weeks chart run on the Italian top-10, receiving the platinum certification by the Federation of the Italian Music Industry for domestic downloads exceeding 30,000 unit.

On 18 September 2011, the single also debuted at number 21 on the Spanish Singles Chart, and the following week it rose and peaked at number 15. After the release of the album, the song entered the Swiss Singles Chart, where it peaked at number 49, and the US Latin Pop Airplay chart, peaking at number 15.

== Charts ==
Chart (2011)	Peak position
Belgium (Ultratip Bubbling Under Wallonia)	8
Italy (FIMI)	1
Italy Airplay (Nielsen Music Control)	3
Mexico (Billboard Mexican Airplay)	19
Mexico (Billboard Espanol Airplay)	7
Spain (Promusicae)	15
Spain Airplay (PROMUSICAE)	4
Switzerland (Schweizer Hitparade)	49
US Latin Pop (Billboard)	15
US Latin Songs (Billboard)	41

== Personnel ==
Music credits

- Niccolò Agliardi – backing vocals, composer
- Prisca Amori – orchestra leader
- B.I.M. Orchestra – orchestra
- Paolo Carta – guitars, programming, composer, arrangements, orchestra conductor, backing vocals
- Nathan East – bass
- Steve Ferrone – drums
- Marzia Gonzo – backing vocals
- Laura Pausini – vocals, composer, backing vocals
- Rosaria Sindona – backing vocals
- Giuseppe Tortora – contractor
- Bruno Zucchetti – keyboards

Production credits

- Riccardo Benini – executive producer
- Renato Cantele – assistant
- Paolo Carta – producer, engineer
- Nicola Fantozzi – assistant
- Marco Nuzzi – executive producer
- Davide Palmiotto – assistant

== See also ==
- List of number-one hits of 2011 (Italy)
