= Laura Pausini =

Italian singer (born 1974)

Laura Pausini OMRI
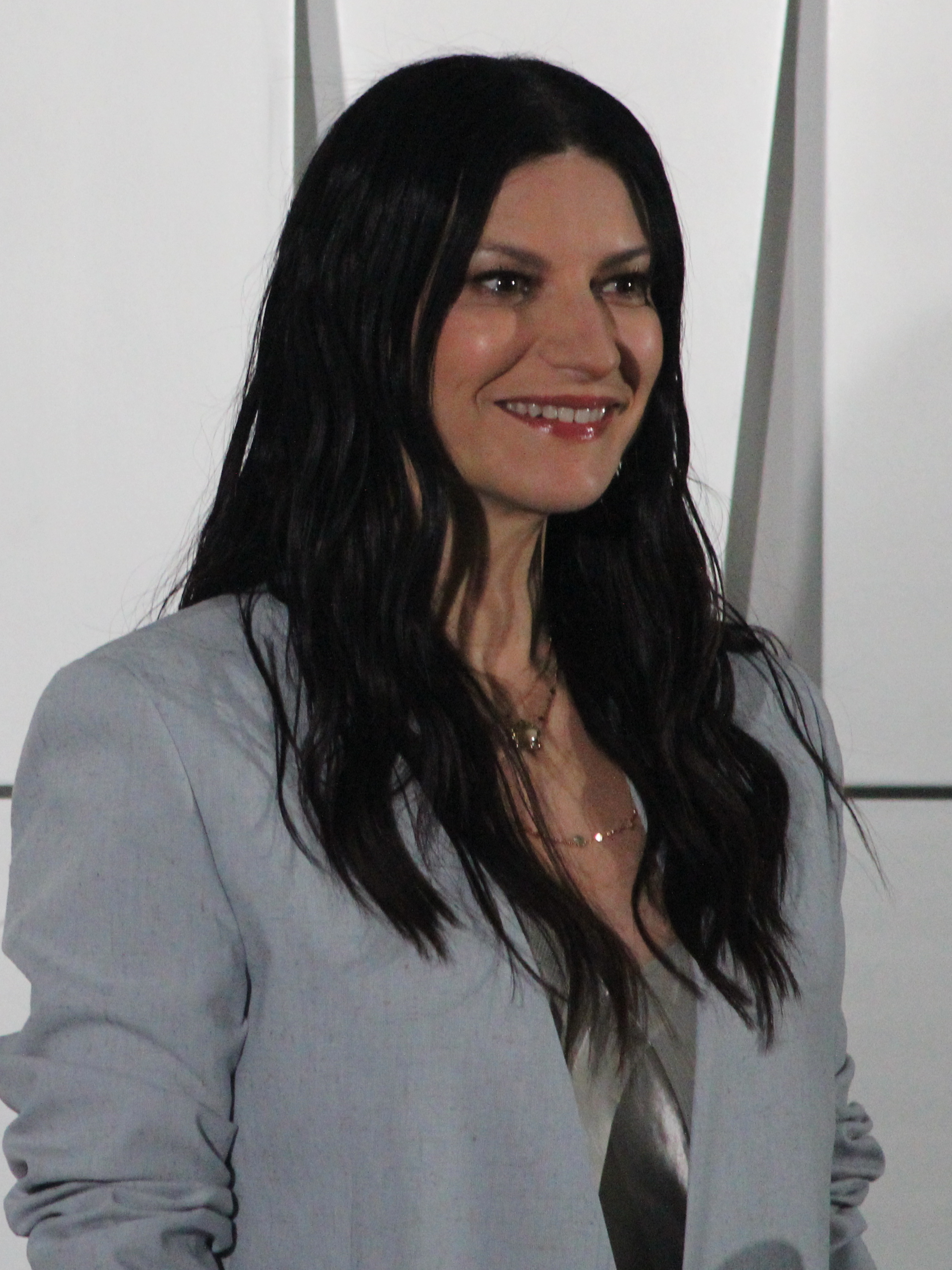
- Pausini at the Sanremo Music Festival 2026
- Born: 16 May 1974 (age 52); Faenza, Emilia-Romagna, Italy
- Occupations: Singer; songwriter; television personality
- Years active: 1993–present
- Spouse: Paolo Carta (m. 2023)
- Children: 1
- Awards: Golden Globe Award for Best Original Song; Grammy Award for Best Latin Pop Album; Sanremo Music Festival 1993
- Musical career
- Genres: Pop; Latin pop; pop rock
- Instrument: Vocals
- Labels: Atlantic; Warner
- Website: laurapausini.com

Signature
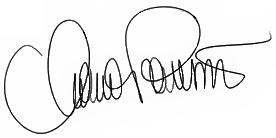

Laura Pausini (Italian: [ˈlaura pauˈziːni]; born 16 May 1974) is an Italian pop singer. She rose to fame in 1993, winning the newcomer artists' section of the 43rd Sanremo Music Festival with the song "La solitudine", which became an Italian standard and an international hit. Her self-titled debut album was released in Italy on 23 April 1993 and later became an international success, selling two million copies worldwide. Its follow-up, Laura, was released in 1994 and confirmed her international success, selling three million copies worldwide.

Pausini has released fifteen studio albums, two international greatest hits albums and one compilation album for the Anglophone market only. She mostly performs in Italian and Spanish, but has also recorded and sung songs in Portuguese, English, French, German, Latin, Chinese, Catalan, Neapolitan, Romanian, Romagnol and Sicilian.

In 2004, AllMusic's Jason Birchmeier considered Pausini's sales "an impressive feat for someone who'd never really broken into the lucrative English-language market". In 2014, FIMI certified Pausini's sales of more than 70 million records with a FIMI Icon Award, making her the fourth best-selling female artist in Latin music, and the best-selling non-Spanish speaking female Latin music artist. In 2025, she ranked 9th on Billboard's "Best 50 Female Latin Pop Artists of All Time" list.

Pausini appeared as a coach on both the Mexican and Spanish versions of international reality television singing competition franchise The Voice, was a judge on the first and second series of La banda, and was likewise a judge on the Spanish version of international franchise The X Factor. In 2016, she debuted as a variety show presenter, hosting the television show Laura & Paola, with actress Paola Cortellesi. She was also one of the presenters of the Eurovision Song Contest 2022 and the Sanremo Music Festival 2026.

Throughout her career, she has won numerous music awards in Italy and internationally. In 2006, she won a Grammy Award, receiving the accolade for Best Latin Pop Album for the record Escucha. In 2021, she was nominated for the Academy Award for Best Original Song with "Io sì (Seen)" from the film The Life Ahead. The single also won the Golden Globe Award for Best Original Song, making it the first Italian-language song to win the award. She has been honoured as a Commander Order of Merit of the Italian Republic by President Carlo Azeglio Ciampi and as a World Ambassador of Emilia Romagna.

== Life and career ==
=== Early life ===
The elder of two daughters, Laura Pausini was born in Faenza, in the Province of Ravenna to Fabrizio Pausini and Gianna Ballardini. She grew up in Solarolo, a small comune in the same region. Her father is a former pianist who also played as a sessionman for ABBA's Frida Lyngstad and entered a band whose members later founded the Italian pop group Pooh. After becoming a piano bar artist, he encouraged Pausini to start performing as a singer. Her first live performance was on 16 May 1985, when she sang together with her father in a restaurant in Bologna. Following this, her father started giving her singing lessons and she continued to perform alongside him in local piano bars. In the meanwhile, she also started singing in a church choir.

In 1987 she recorded her first demo album, produced by her father and released to promote her live shows. Titled I sogni di Laura, it consisted of eight covers and five new songs. In 1991 she participated in the Castrocaro Music Festival singing Liza Minnelli's "New York, New York", but she failed to reach the final stage of the competition. During the same year, she took part in another singing competition, Sanremo Famosi, which should have served as a selection for the newcomers' of the following Sanremo Music Festival. Despite being declared the joint winner with another contestant, Pausini was not allowed to compete in the Sanremo Music Festival 1992.

=== 1993–1995: Career breakthrough, Spanish-language debut and international success ===
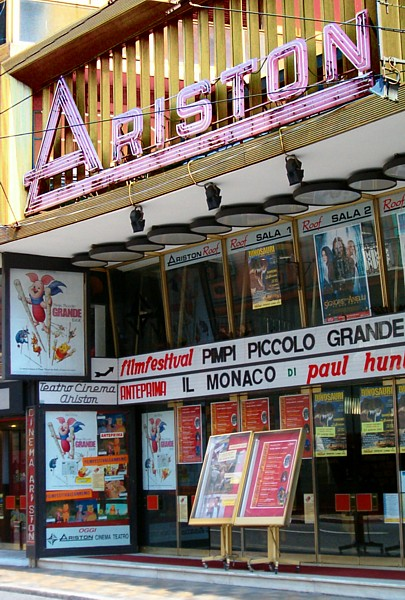
Pausini rose to fame in 1993, after winning the 43rd Sanremo Music Festival, annually held at the Teatro Ariston in Sanremo, Italy.

Thanks to her performances in local singing competitions, Pausini was noticed by Italian producer and songwriter Angelo Valsiglio, who introduced her to manager Marco Marati. Valsiglio suggested to her "La solitudine", a song he wrote with Pietro Cremonesi and Federico Cavalli. Pausini's rendition convinced Valsiglio and Marati, who wanted Pausini to audition for some major labels. During one of the auditions, she met Fabrizio Giannini of Warner Music Italy's Compagnia Generale del Disco. After impressing him with a performance of an unreleased Mia Martini song, Pausini obtained her first recording contract, becoming one of the first artists discovered by Giannini, who later launched the careers of several Italian acts, including Irene Grandi.

"La solitudine" was selected as one of the entries in the newcomer artists' section of the 43rd Sanremo Music Festival. Pausini performed it for the first time on 23 February 1993, during the first night of the contest. After being admitted to the final, held on 27 February 1993, she won the competition, receiving 7,464 votes from the juries and beating Gerardina Trovato with "Ma non ho più la mia città", who took second place with 7,209 votes. The song also became a commercial success in Italy, and it is still one of Pausini's best-known hits.

Following the success obtained with her debut single, Pausini started working on her first professional album, Laura Pausini. The album was recorded while Pausini was still a high school student at the "Gaetano Ballardini" Institute of Ceramics in Faenza, Italy, where she got her diploma a few months after the release of her debut studio set. Released by CGD Records in May 1993, it sold 400,000 copies in Italy. The album was also promoted through an Italian outdoor tour during the summer of 1993. In September 1993, Pausini received a Telegatto for Revelation of the Year.

In late 1993, the album was released in the rest of Europe, peaking at number three on the Dutch Albums Chart and reaching the top spot in Belgium. It also achieved commercial success in South America, being certified gold in Brazil and Argentina. Worldwide sales of Pausini's debut studio album exceed two million units. Moreover, "La solitudine" became a radio hit in Belgium and the Netherlands, it peaked at number five on the French Singles Chart and it reached the top spot of the Dutch Top 40 and of the Flemish Ultratop 50. The album also spawned the singles "Non c'è" and "Perché non torna più".

In February 1994, Pausini participated for the second time in the Sanremo Music Festival, competing in the "Big Artists" section with her entry "Strani amori". The song ranked third in the competition, behind Aleandro Baldi's "Passerà" and Giorgio Faletti's "Signor tenente", and became a hit in Italy, in the Netherlands and in Flanders. The single launched Pausini's second studio album, Laura, released in February 1994. According to CGD Records, the album sold 150,000 copies in Italy in its first week, with initial shipments of 200,000 units. It also peaked at number one on the Dutch Albums Chart and entered the charts in Belgium and Switzerland, selling three million copies worldwide and achieving gold and platinum status in Brazil and Argentina, respectively. Other singles from the album were "Gente", "Lui non sta con te" and "Lettera". During the summer of 1994, Pausini took part in the Italian itinerant TV show Festivalbar, reaching the final stage of the music competition and receiving the Premio Europa for her international success. In 1994 she was also awarded with her second Telegatto, receiving the prize for Best Female Artist. In the meanwhile, she started an Italian tour to promote her album.

During the same year, Pausini released her first Spanish-language album, Laura Pausini, a compilation of ten adapted versions of hits from her previous albums, issued by Dro Records. The record became the best-selling album of 1994 in Spain, where it was later certified diamond by the Association of Phonographic and Videographic of Spain for sales exceeding one million units. Pausini was the first non-Spanish artist to achieve this result. Following the commercial success obtained in the country, the Spanish Institute of Italian Culture awarded her a "Globo de Platino" for contributing in the spread of Italian culture in Spain.

The album was successful in Latin America too, being certified platinum by the Argentine Chamber of Phonograms and Videograms Producers, the Asociación Colombiana de Productores de Fonogramas and the Chilean division of the International Federation of the Phonographic Industry. Moreover, the first four singles from the album, "La soledad", "Se fue", "Amores extraños" and "Gente", entered the top 30 on the Hot Latin Songs chart compiled by Billboard. Thanks to these results, Billboard ranked Pausini the second female revelation of 1994, after Mariah Carey. In 1995 Pausini also received the World Music Award for Best Selling Italian Recording Artist and the Lo Nuestro Award for Best New Artist of the Year.

Pausini's first record for the British market was a self-titled compilation album released in 1995, including nine Italian-language hits and an English-language version of her first single, "La solitudine (Loneliness)", whose lyrics were adapted by Tim Rice. "La solitudine (Loneliness)" was initially set to be released as a single in the United Kingdom on 19 June 1995, but it was postponed and released in September of the same year. Both the album and the single obtained a very poor commercial reception, failing to enter the charts in the United Kingdom.

=== 1996–1999: Le cose che vivi and La mia risposta / Mi respuesta ===
Following the success obtained by Pausini's debut Spanish album, her third studio set was released on 12 September 1996 both in Italian and Spanish, under the titles Le cose che vivi and Las cosas que vives, respectively. Starting from that moment, Pausini has recorded most of her songs both in her native language and in Spanish, in a practice that, according to AllMusic's Jason Birchmeier, has "come to define her career and compound her success". A special edition of the album was also released in Brazil, featuring three additional bonus tracks in Portuguese.

The album was preceded by the single "Incancellabile", released to Italian radio stations on 26 August 1996 and titled "Inolvidable" in its version for the Hispanic market. Other singles from the album include the title-track "Le cose che vivi", whose Spanish-language version topped the Billboard Latin Pop Songs chart, "Ascolta il tuo cuore", "Seamisai" and "Dos enamorados", which was not released in its Italian-language version. The album sold 3,500,000 copies worldwide and was certified Platinum by the International Federation of the Phonographic Industry, for European sales exceeding 1,000,000 units. At the 9th Lo Nuestro Awards for Latin Music, Pausini was nominated for Pop Female Singer and Video of the Year for the Spanish-language version of "Le cose che vivi".

In December 1996, Pausini was among the artists singing for Pope John Paul II during the Natale in Vaticano concert, a Christmas show held at the Paul VI Audience Hall. During the event, she performed a cover of John Lennon's "Happy Xmas (War Is Over)" and the song "Il mondo che vorrei". In February 1997 she was also invited as a guest to the Viña del Mar International Song Festival in Chile. On 1 March 1997, she launched from Geneva the World Wide Tour in support of the album, giving concerts in Italy, Switzerland, Belgium, the Netherlands, Portugal, Spain, France, as well as in the United States, Canada and many other American countries, including Venezuela, Brazil, Uruguay, Argentina, Paraguay, Colombia and Mexico. It was Pausini's first international tour, during which she gave concerts in indoor arenas for the first time. In August of the same year, during the last night of the Festivalbar, she received the International Award for the success she achieved abroad.

In 1998, Pausini released her fourth studio album, La mia risposta, together with its Spanish-language counterpart, Mi respuesta. The album, which included a song penned by Phil Collins, was dubbed by Italian music critics as a mature work, with influences from soul music, but, despite reaching the top spot of the Italian Albums Chart, it was a moderate commercial success, selling two million copies worldwide. The lead single from the album, "Un'emergenza d'amore", was released in September 1998, and was followed by "In assenza di te" and "La mia risposta", the latter being performed during the Festivalbar in 1999.

To promote the album, Pausini began in early 1999 the La Mia Risposta World Tour '99, during which she performed in theatres throughout Europe. On 1 June 1999, she was one of the artists performing along with Italian tenor Luciano Pavarotti in Modena during his annual "Pavarotti and Friends" concert. Pavarotti and Pausini duetted in the Italian version of the aria "Dein ist mein ganzes Herz", titled "Tu che m'hai preso il cuor", from Franz Lehár's operetta Das Land des Lächelns. The live performance was later included in the album Pavarotti & Friends for the Children of Guatemala and Kosovo. In 1999, she also contributed the Richard Marx composition "One More Time" to the Message in a Bottle soundtrack. The track was produced by David Foster who was featured on piano.

=== 2000–2003: Tra te e il mare / Entre tú y mil mares and From the Inside ===
In 2000, she recorded the song "The Extra Mile" for the soundtrack of the movie Pokémon 2000: The Power of One. The song was included in the album Tra te e il mare, released on 11 September 2000 and preceded by the homonymous single, written by Italian pop singer Biagio Antonacci. Other singles from the album include "Il mio sbaglio più grande", which was a top 20 hit in Italy, and "Volevo dirti che ti amo", whose Spanish-language version "Quiero decirte que te amo" peaked at number 15 on the Billboard Latin Pop Songs chart. The album also features the songs "Viaggio con te", which was composed by her father and which was awarded in 2001 with an Italian Lunezia Award for Best Songwriter of the Year, and "Per vivere", written from the point of view of a homeless child Pausini met in Rio de Janeiro and dedicated to two Brazilian children sponsored by her.

Tra te e il mare received a nomination for Album of the Year at the Premio Italiano della Musica, while Pausini was nominated for Best Female Artist during the same award ceremony, as well as in the first edition of the Italian Music Awards, held in February 2001. A Spanish-language version of the album, titled Entre tú y mil mares, was released shortly before the Italian-language edition, on 11 September 2000. At the 2001 Latin Grammy Awards, the record received two nominations for Best Female Pop Vocal Album and Best Engineered Album, while Pausini and Alfredo Cerruti were in the shortlist for Producer of the Year.

Pausini's first international greatest hits album was released in 2001, both in an Italian-language version and in a Spanish-language edition, titled The Best of Laura Pausini: E ritorno da te and Lo mejor de Laura Pausini: Volveré junto a ti, respectively. The first single, "E ritorno da te"—"Volveré junto a ti" in Spanish—was accompanied by a music video shot by Italian film director Gabriele Muccino. The album also includes the single "Una storia che vale" and features guest appearances by Brazilian singer Gilberto Gil in "Seamisai" and by Italian singer Nek, who plays bass in "Non c'è".

Supported by the 2001/2002 World Tour, which started in Miami on 19 October 2001, the greatest hits became one of Pausini's biggest commercial successes, selling 700,000 copies in Italy and 800,000 copies in France. During the concert she gave in Milan on 2 December 2001 as part of the tour, Pausini also recorded her first live video album, titled Live 2001-2002 World Tour and released on 30 November 2002.

In 2001, Pausini started working with producers such as Patrick Leonard and John Shanks on her first English-language album, From the Inside. Released in Canada, Mexico and the United States by Atlantic Records on 5 November 2002, the album did not get the expected success, selling 50,000 copies in the U.S., according to Nielsen-Soundscan. The album singles "Surrender" and "If That's Love" reached the top spot on the Hot Dance Club Songs Chart, but Pausini, disappointed at her English-language debut being ignored in the U.S. outside the club scene, abandoned the promotion for From the Inside due to her label promoting it as a dance album instead of a pop album as she requested. The album was later released in Europe too, selling 800,000 copies worldwide.

In 2003 Luciano Pavarotti invited her for the second time to the "Pavarotti and Friends" concert, where they duetted again in "Tu che m'hai preso il cuor".

=== 2004–2005: Resta in ascolto / Escucha and Grammy wins ===
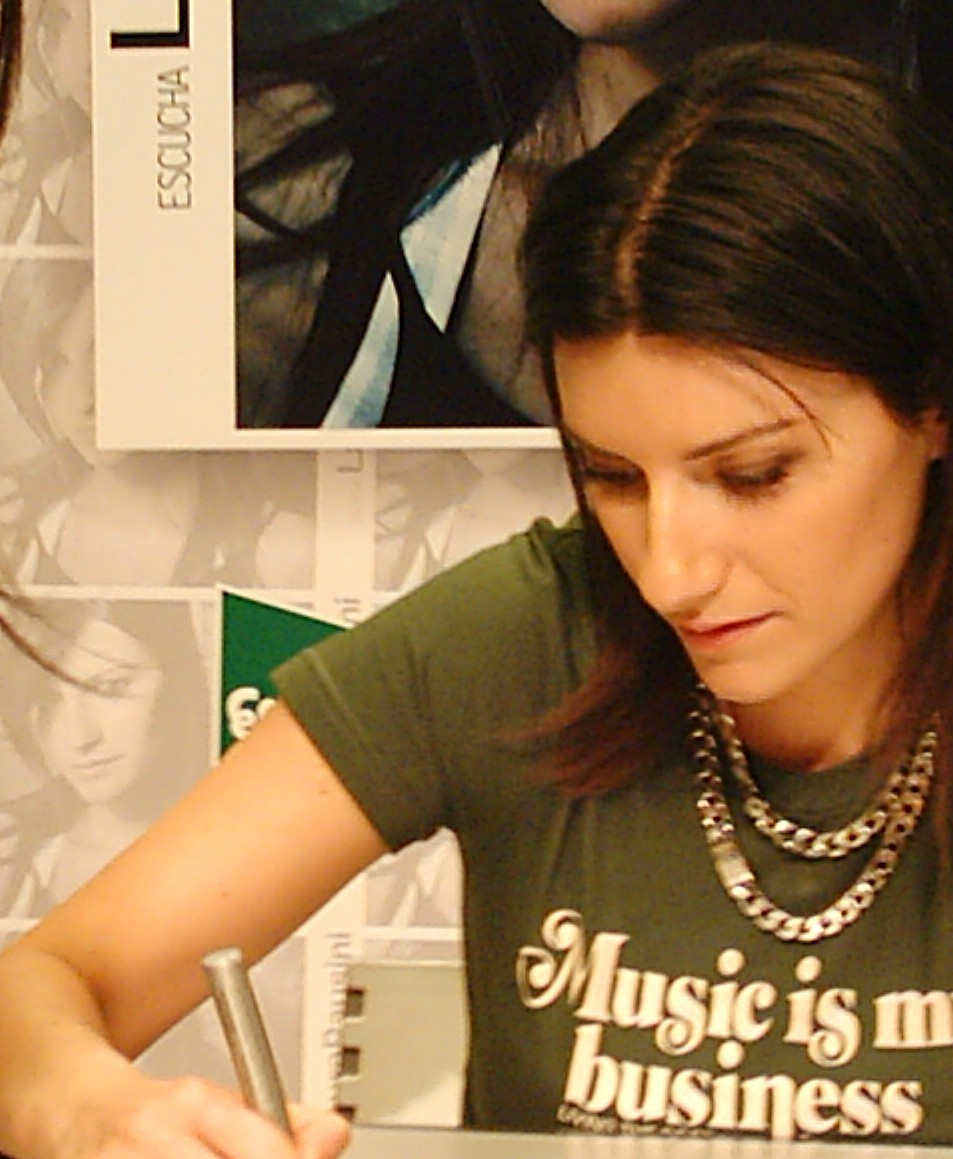
Pausini during the presentation of her album Resta in ascolto / Escucha in 2004

In October 2004, Pausini released her eighth studio album, Resta in ascolto, and its Spanish-language counterpart, Escucha. Influenced by international artists including Phil Collins and Celine Dion, the recording is on the subject of a break-up and was written in 2002, during her separation from her ex-boyfriend and producer Alfredo Cerruti.

The album features the song "Mi abbandono a te", co-written by Pausini, Rick Nowels and Madonna. It also includes the Biagio Antonacci-written ballad "Vivimi", whose Spanish-language version, "Viveme", won a Billboard Latin Music Award in 2006 for Female Latin Pop Airplay Song of the Year, and the single "Benedetta passione", penned by Italian rock-star Vasco Rossi. Well received by music critics, the album is mainly focused on themes of anger, bitterness, desire for independence and interior peace, but also features a song about the Iraq War, in which Pausini sings about Ali Ismail Abbas, a boy who was severely injured in a nighttime rocket attack near Baghdad in 2003.

The album debuted at number one on the Italian Albums Chart and sold 350,000 copies in Italy. Its Spanish version later won Best Female Pop Vocal Album at the Latin Grammy Awards of 2005 and Best Latin Pop Album at the 48th Grammy Awards, making Pausini the first Italian female artist to win a Grammy Award. In January 2005, Pausini started a new tour to promote the album. The concerts she gave at the Zénith de Paris on 22 and 23 March 2005 were filmed and released as a live album in November 2005, titled Live in Paris 05.

Pausini made a guest appearance on Michael Bublé's 2005 live album Caught in the Act, singing a duet with Bublé of Lou Rawls' hit "You'll Never Find Another Love Like Mine". The duet was placed on both the audio CD, and the full concert DVD that aired on PBS as an episode of Great Performances.

At the 2006 Lo Nuestro Award, Pausini was nominated in the sections Album of the Year for Escucha, Song of the Year and Video of the Year for "Viveme" and won the award for Best Female Pop Artist.

=== 2006–2007: Io canto ===
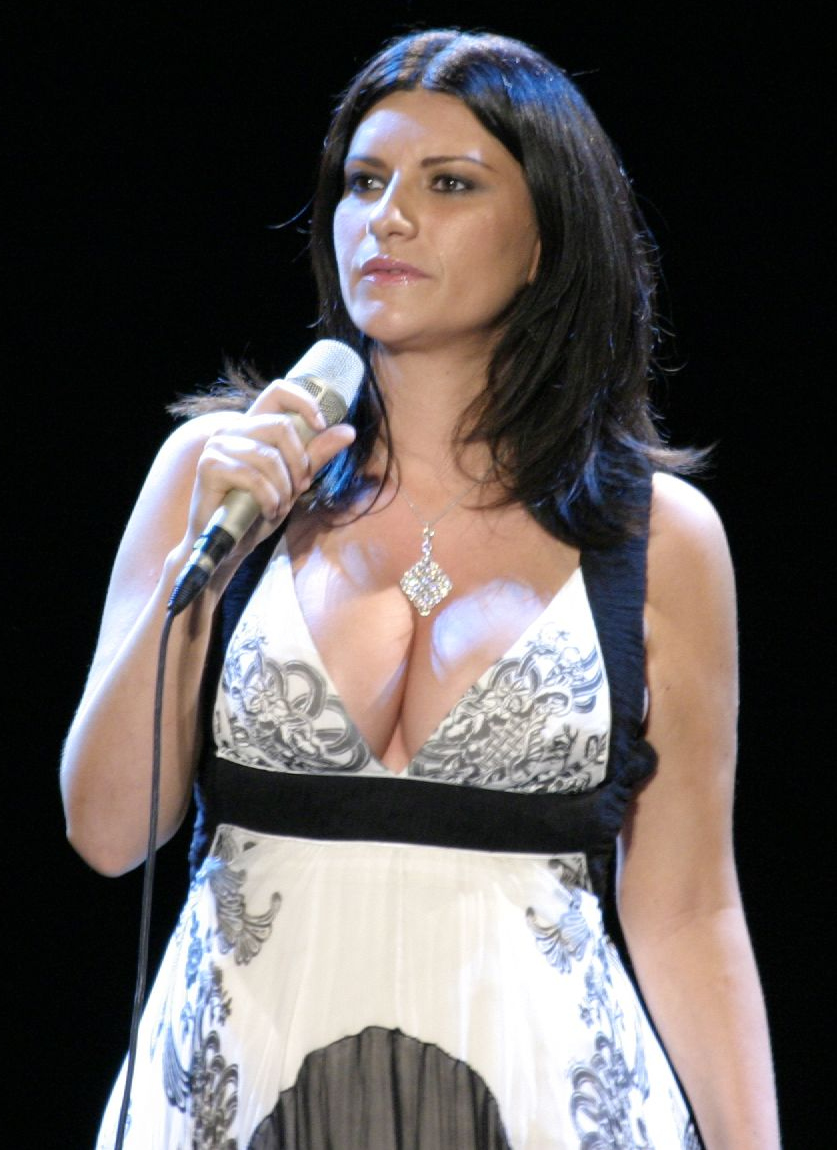
Pausini performing during the Festival Teatro-Canzone, in memory of Italian singer Giorgio Gaber, in July 2007

In November 2006, Pausini released the album Io canto / Yo canto, consisting of covers of Italian pop rock songs. On the album liner notes, Pausini wrote: "here is the music I listen to when I'm at my saddest, or when I feel a moment is special, the songs I used to sing as a young girl when I first started performing, and above all those which taught me to love music, and how music can move you so deeply, regardless of its genre or style".

The album also features duets with Tiziano Ferro, Juanes and Johnny Hallyday. It debuted at number one on the Italian Albums Chart and held the top spot for 8 non-consecutive weeks. It also became the best-selling album of 2006 in Italy, selling 500,000 copies in less than two months. On 8 November 2007, the album won Best Female Pop Vocal Album at the Latin Grammy Awards. Laura dedicated the award to the memory of Italian tenor Luciano Pavarotti. Later on during the show she sang "Vivere (Dare to Live)" alongside Italian singer Andrea Bocelli.

In Summer 2006, Pausini played a Juntos en concierto tour with Marc Anthony and Marco Antonio Solís, consisting of 20 concerts throughout the United States.

On 2 June 2007, Pausini was the first female artist to play at the San Siro Stadium in Milan, in front of a crowd of 70,000 spectators. On 30 November 2007, the concert was released on CD and DVD, under the title San Siro 2007.

=== 2008–2010: Primavera in anticipo, Amiche per l'Abruzzo, and Laura Live ===
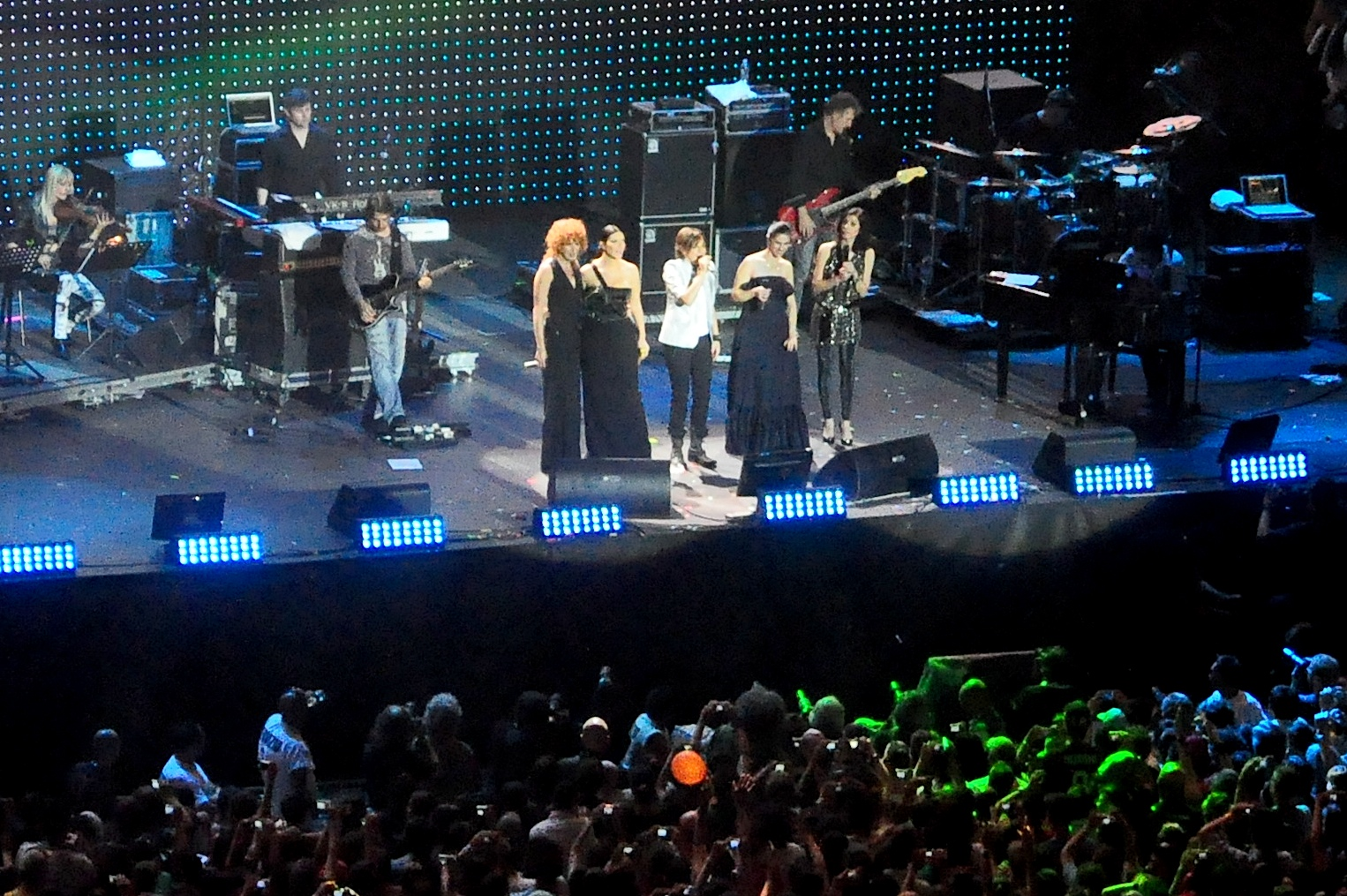
Concert of Amiche per l'Abruzzo

Pausini spent the first months of 2008 recording her tenth studio album, Primavera in anticipo / Primavera anticipada. The Spanish language edition of the album was released on 11 November 2008, while the Italian language edition was released in Italy on 14 November 2008. The album was preceded by the single "Invece no" / "En cambio no", released on 24 October 2008 and promoted with an appearance in Piazza Trinità dei Monti in Rome on 14 November 2008. The album also features the single "Primavera in anticipo (It Is My Song)" / Primavera anticipada (It Is My Song)", a duet with British singer-songwriter James Blunt. Also in late 2008, French chansonnier Charles Aznavour and Pausini recorded Aznavour's 1965 song "Paris au mois d'août" for Aznavour's Duos album, both in French as well as the Italian version "Parigi in agosto". Pausini grew up listening to Aznavour's songs, and in a January 2009 interview on France 2's Vivement Dimanche hosted by Michel Drucker, Aznavour said of Pausini, seated by his side after a live duet performance of "Paris au mois d'août", that "she knows the lyrics [to my songs] better than me." In November 2009 Primavera in anticipo went on to win Best Female Pop Vocal Album at the Latin Grammy Awards. In 2010 Pausini also won the Lo Nuestro Award for Female Artist of the Year.

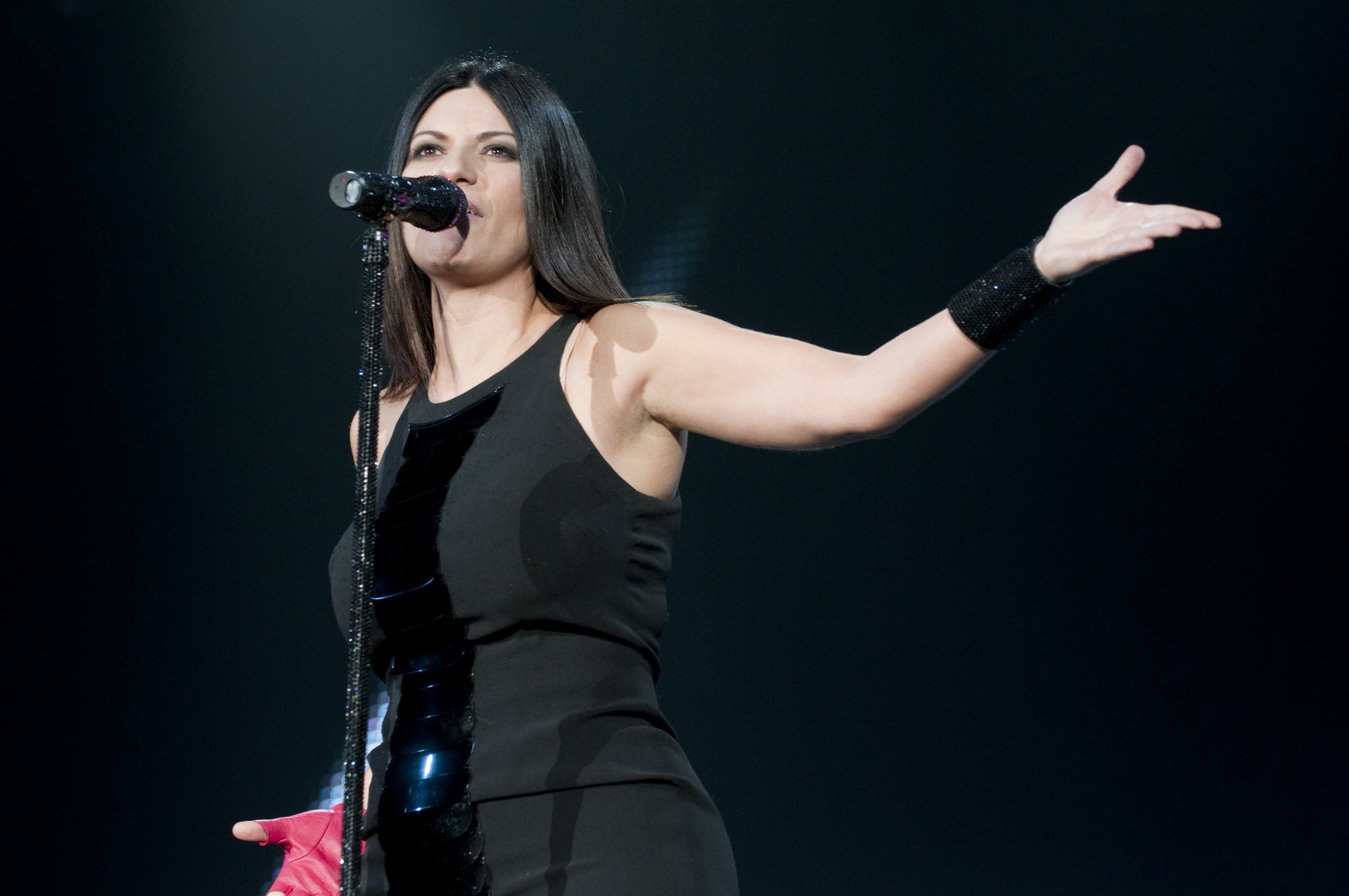
Pausini performing during the World Tour 2009

On 21 June 2009, Pausini organized a mega-concert in the San Siro Stadium in Milan, raising money to support the victims of the 2009 L'Aquila earthquake. The concert, named Amiche per l'Abruzzo, involved 43 Italian female singers and was later released on a DVD, which sold 250,000 copies in Italy.

In the meanwhile, on 5 March 2009, Pausini began her World Tour 2009 in Turin, which reached Europe in May 2009 and then South America and the United States in autumn 2009. The last leg of the tour took place in Italy in November 2009. A CD of the tour, along with a DVD, was released on 27 November 2009 with the title Laura Live World Tour 09 / Laura Live Gira Mundial 09. The album also includes three new songs, the singles "Con la musica alla radio" / "Con la musica en la radio", "Non sono lei" / "Ella no soy" and "Casomai" / "Menos mal".

=== 2011–2012: Inedito ===
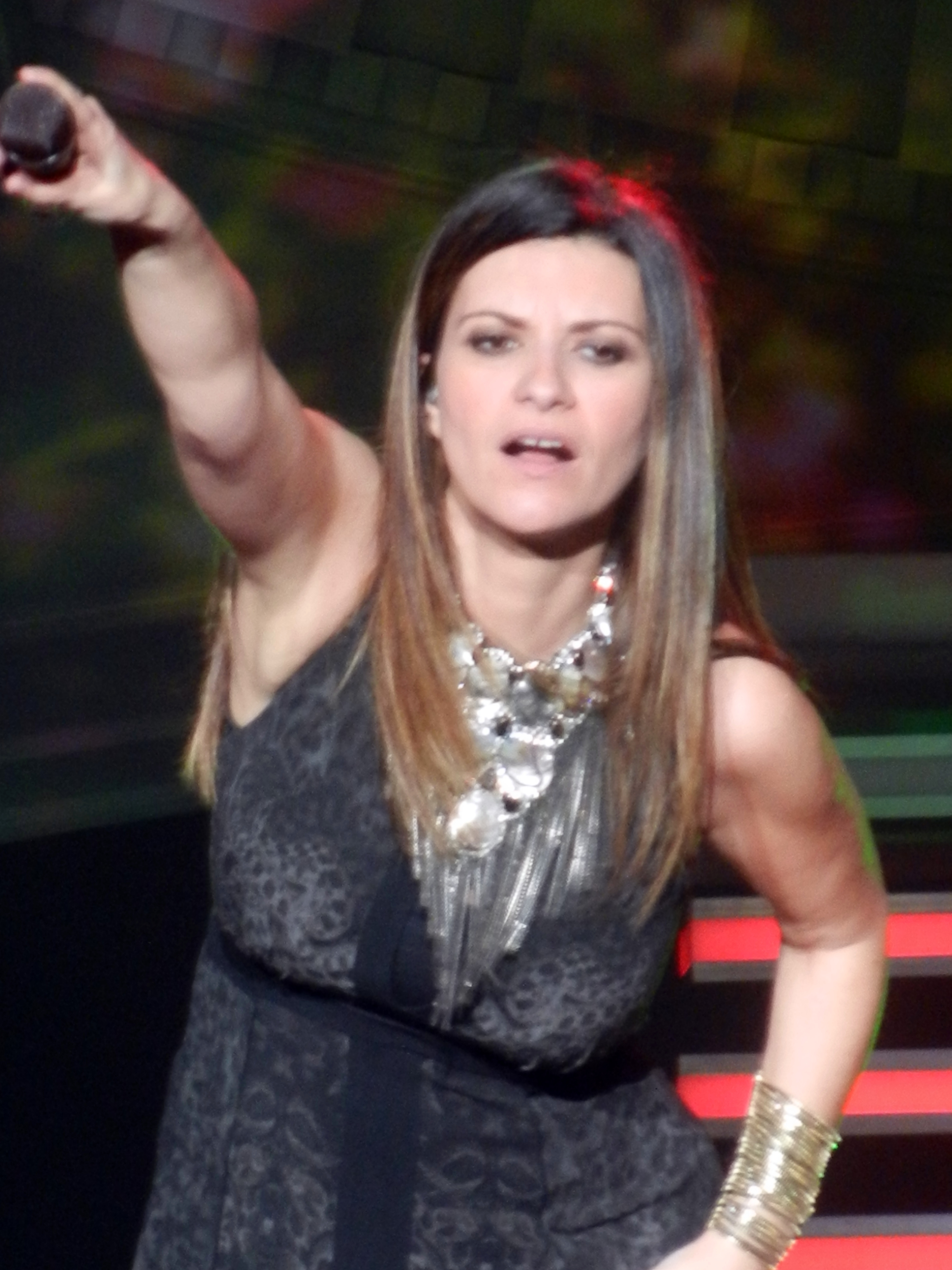
Pausini performing in Bercy in April 2012 during the Inedito World Tour

On 30 December 2010, Pausini announced her new studio album, Inedito / Inédito, released both in Italian and Spanish on 11 November 2011. The title and the track list of the album were announced through Pausini's website on 10 September 2011. The first single from the album, "Benvenuto" / "Bienvenido", was released on 12 September 2011. To promote the album, Pausini engaged the Inedito World Tour, starting with 11 shows in Italy in late December 2011. The tour reached Latin America in January and February 2012. The European leg of her tour visited the principle arenas of France, Switzerland, Spain, Germany, Belgium and the Netherlands, and concluded at the Royal Albert Hall in London.

The album also spawned the singles "Non ho mai smesso" / "Jamás abandoné", "Bastava" / "Bastaba", "Mi tengo", "Le cose che non-mi aspetto" / "Las cosas que no me espero" and "Celeste". The song "Troppo tempo" was originally chosen as the sixth and last single of the album, but when Pausini discovered her pregnancy she changed her mind to "Celeste". The album has sold 1,000,000 copies worldwide. The music video for "Mi tengo", one of the singles from Inedito, was directed by Gianluigi Fazio and Giorgio Fazio. It was shot in March 2012 on a minimalist white set and premiered on 18 March 2012 at the Nelson Mandela Forum in Florence during the Inedito World Tour. The video features Pausini and a group of dancers symbolically interpreting the song's lyrics. On 25 June 2012, Pausini took part in the mega-concert Concerto per l'Emilia, organized to raise funds in support of the people affected by the 2012 Northern Italy earthquakes. During the show, Pausini duetted with Cesare Cremonini, performing a cover of Lucio Dalla's "L'anno che verrà".

On 27 November 2012, a special edition of Inedito, in both Italian and Spanish, was released, featuring a live DVD recorded during the 2012 Inedito World Tour. The Italian-language version and the Spanish-language version of the DVD were recorded in Bologna on 17 April 2012 and in Madrid on 20 April 2012, respectively. The CD included in the new edition of Inedito also features a live medley performed by Pausini on New Year's Eve 2012, as well as a duet with Venezuelan singer Carlos Baute on the track "Las cosas que no me espero", released as a single in Spain and the Americas.

In 2012 Pausini also recorded an Italian-language duet with Josh Groban, "E ti prometterò", included in his album All That Echoes, released in February 2013.

=== 2013–2014: 20 – The Greatest Hits ===
On 26 February 2013, to celebrate the twentieth anniversary of her career, Pausini released a medley including the original versions in Italian, Spanish and English of the song which launched her career in 1993, "La solitudine". The track was launched as a limited-edition digital single, available for purchase for a week only. On 1 June 2013 Pausini took part in the Chime for Change concert at Twickenham Stadium in London, supporting the global campaign of the same name for girls' and women's empowerment. Pausini performed the songs "Io canto" and "It's Not Goodbye". During the same year, she appeared as a featured artist on the track "Sonríe (Smile)", included in American singer Gloria Estefan's album The Standards.

In November 2013, Pausini also released a greatest hits album, titled 20 – The Greatest Hits in Italian and 20 – Grandes éxitos in Spanish. The album was preceded by the single "Limpido"—"Limpio" in Spanish—recorded with Australian singer Kylie Minogue. Other singles from the album include the new tracks "Se non te" and "Dove resto solo io", released for the Italian market, and the revamped versions of "Víveme" and "Se fue", featuring Alejandro Sanz and Marc Anthony, respectively.

Starting from December 2013, Pausini promoted her greatest hits album through The Greatest Hits World Tour, giving concerts in her native Italy, as well as in other European countries, in Latin America, in the United States and in Canada. The tour also included performances during the Viña del Mar International Song Festival in Chile and the Feria del Hogar in Peru. The concert she gave in Taormina, featuring several guests, was conceived as the first Italian "one woman show", and it was broadcast by Rai Uno in May 2014. A new version of the album was released in November 2014 for the hispanophone market. The new edition includes a duet with Thalía in "Sino a ti", a new version of "Entre tu y mil mares", featuring Melendi, and a re-recording of "Donde quedo solo yo", performed with Álex Ubago. The latter was also recorded under the title "Jo sempre hi seré", becoming Pausini's first Catalan song. This version was included in El disc de La Marató 2014, a compilation album related to the telethon organized by Catalan channel TV3, with the purpose of raising money against cardiovascular diseases.

On 13 November 2014, Pausini was the first artist to be inducted in the newly created Paseo de las Estrellas in Tijuana, Mexico. In Autumn 2014, Pausini was one of the four coaches of the fourth season of the Mexican reality show and singing competition La Voz. Pausini also served as a coach for the third series of the Spanish version of the competition, La Voz, which debuted on Telecinco in January 2015. During the same year, she continued her tour, which reached Australia and Russia.

=== 2015–2016: Simili, television work, and Laura Xmas ===
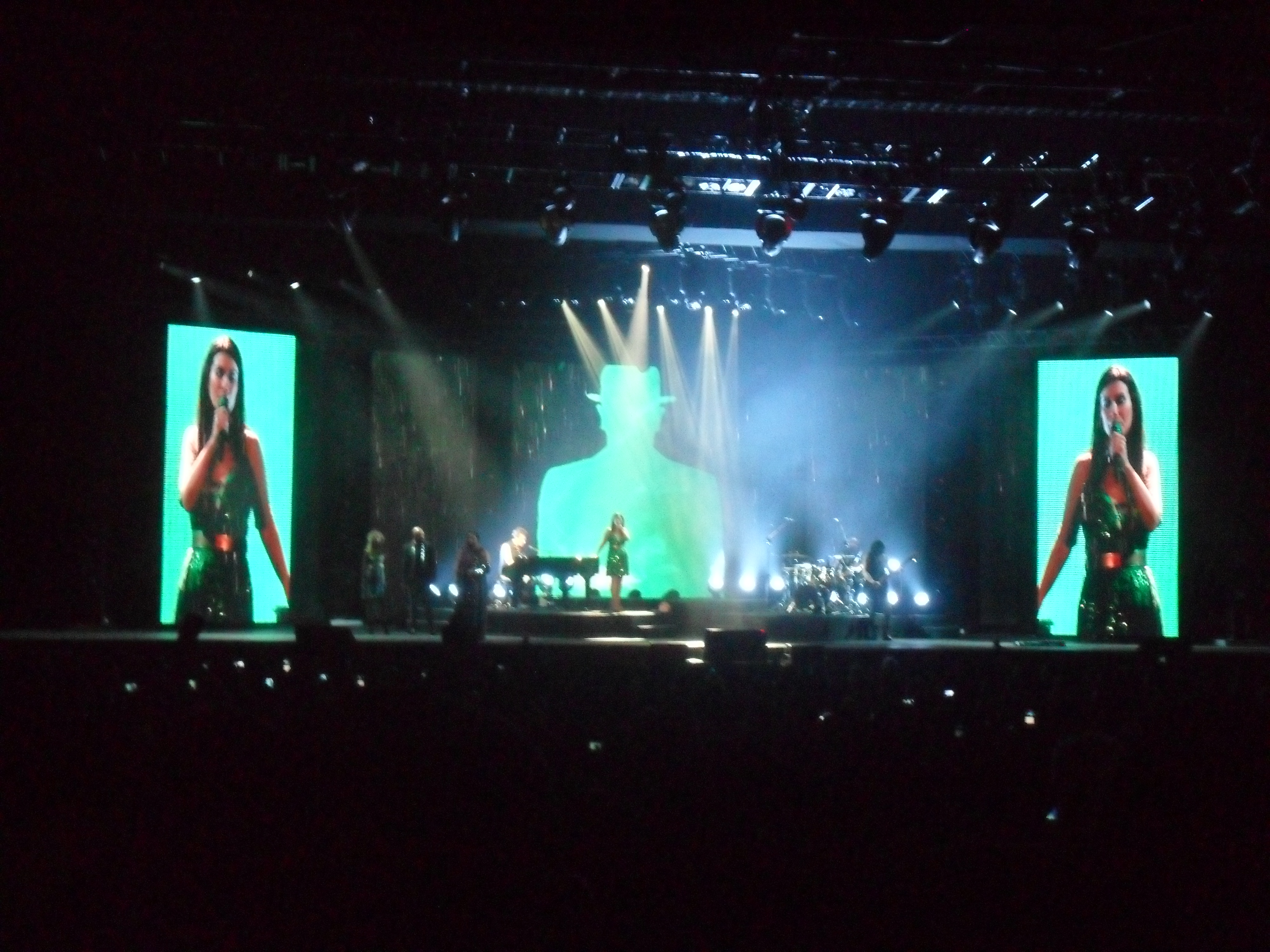
Pausini during a show of the Latin American leg of the Simili World Tour, September 2016

At the 27th Lo Nuestro Awards, Pausini received a special award in recognition of her music career trajectory. After performing a medley of songs including the salsa version of "Se fué" with Marc Anthony, she stated that although she is Italian, "half of my heart beats Latino".

In August 2015, Pausini co-wrote the song "Como yo sabría", with fellow Italian singer-songwriter Virginio Simonelli. The song was recorded by Maverick Lopes, a runner-up in the third season of La Voz Spain, mentored by Pausini herself during the competition. In September of the same year, Pausini, together with singers Alejandro Sanz and Ricky Martin, was a judge in the Univision talent show La banda, created by Simon Cowell.

Pausini's eleventh studio album, Simili, was released on 6 November 2015. The first single from the album, "Lato destro del cuore"—"Lado derecho del corazón" in Spanish—was written by Biagio Antonacci. The album's title track, after being released as its second single, was chosen as the opening song of the third season of the Italian TV series Braccialetti rossi. The album also spawned the singles "En la puerta de al lado", "Innamorata" / "Enamorada", "Ho creduto a me" / "He creído en mi" and "200 note". The Spanish-language version of the album, Similares, received a nomination for a Grammy Award for Best Latin Pop Album.

In April 2016, Pausini hosted with Paola Cortellesi the variety show Laura e Paola, broadcast in Italy by Rai 1. The show included three episodes. Thanks to the show, Pausini received an award at the Premio TV 2016 as TV Personality Revelation of the Year. In June 2016, Pausini became the first Italian female artist to perform a tour in Italian stadiums. Her Pausini Stadi Tour 2016 included concerts at the San Siro Stadium in Milan, at the Stadio Olimpico in Rome, and at the Stadio della Vittoria in Bari. The second and third legs of the tour consisted of shows in Latin America and Europe, respectively, and concluded in October 2016. In late 2016, Pausini was also confirmed as a judge on the second series of La banda.

On 4 November 2016, Pausini released her first Christmas album, Laura Xmas, titled Laura Navidad in its Spanish version. The album, produced by Patrick Williams and recorded with his orchestra, was launched with a performance at Disneyland Paris.

=== 2017–2018: Fatti sentire ===
In autumn 2017, Pausini returned as a coach on the sixth series of La Voz... México. Her new studio album, Fatti sentire, was released on 16 March 2018, both in its Italian-language version and in its Spanish-language counterpart, titled Hazte sentir. The lead single "Non è detto"—"Nadie ha dicho" in Spanish—was released on 16 January 2018. The single was performed during the final night of the 68th Sanremo Music Festival, where Pausini appeared as a special guest. "Nadie ha dicho" premiered in the United States with a performance during the Lo Nuestro Awards gala on 22 February 2018, which were co-hosted by Pausini herself.

In spring 2018, Pausini also appeared as a judge on the third series of Spanish talent show Factor X, which was won by Pol Granch, one of the contestants she mentored as part of the Boys category. To promote Fatti sentire, she embarked on a worldwide tour, starting with two concerts at the Circus Maximus in Rome, which then passed throughout the United States and Latin America. In the fall, she returned to perform throughout Italy between September and October. The two concerts in Eboli, originally to be done in September, were rescheduled for November. She performed in Europe: Spain, France, Belgium, Germany, and Switzerland.

=== 2019–2021: LB Stadi Tour, Una. Nessuna. Centomila, Golden Globe win, and Academy Award nomination ===
In summer 2019, Pausini performed 11 concerts throughout Italy, along with Biagio Antonacci, as part of their collaborative show titled LB Stadi Tour. At the end of the tour, she announced a two-year break from recording music.

In 2020, she returned as a coach in the Spanish edition of La Voz. Pausini was set to perform a concert titled "Pausini BeMe" on 5 September 2020, to celebrate the 25th anniversary of her official fan club. The concert was later cancelled, due to the Italian government's decision to prohibit all live concerts through October 2020, as part of the measures to contain the COVID-19 pandemic in Italy. In February 2020, while appearing as a guest in the 70th Sanremo Music Festival, she also announced a one-night-only concert in the RCF Campovolo in Reggio Emilia, along with six other Italian female artists—Elisa, Fiorella Mannoia, Alessandra Amoroso, Emma, Gianna Nannini, and Giorgia—to help women suffering from domestic violence. Titled Una. Nessuna. Centomila, the event was later postponed to 11 June 2022 due to the pandemic.

In October 2020, Pausini released "Io sì (Seen)", which was written in collaboration with Diane Warren and Niccolò Agliardi and was created for the Netflix feature film The Life Ahead. Pausini recorded the song in five languages. The music video for the single also features the film's star Sophia Loren. Thanks to the song, Pausini won the Golden Globe Award for Best Original Song, making "Io sì (Seen)" the first Italian-language song to win the prize, and was nominated for the Academy Award for Best Original Song.

=== 2022: Laura Pausini – Piacere di conoscerti and Eurovision Song Contest ===
In July 2021, Pausini announced she has been working on a film since February 2020. The film, directed by Ivan Cotroneo and set to be released on Amazon Prime Video in 2022, is based on an idea by Pausini herself, and titled Laura Pausini – Piacere di conoscerti. Pausini also starred in the film, thus debuting as an actress. The song "Scatola"—titled "Caja" in Spanish—was released as a single from the film's soundtrack. After performing "Scatola" during the second night of the Sanremo Music Festival 2022, Pausini was announced to be one of the presenters of the Eurovision Song Contest 2022, which was held in Turin in May, alongside Alessandro Cattelan and Mika. On 28 October 2022, Pausini was announced to be one of the four presenters of the 23rd Annual Latin Grammy Awards, which were held in Las Vegas in November, alongside Anitta, Luis Fonsi and Thalía. She was the first Italian artist to host the Latin Grammy Awards.

=== 30 years in international music ===
The Warner Music record company honoured Pausini at the beginning of 2023 for being the most listened to and awarded Italian singer worldwide, with almost a thousand concerts behind her.

On 25 January 2023, Pausini announced two new concerts, to celebrate her 30-year career. Two events in exceptional locations; Piazza San Marco in the Italian city of Venice on 30 June and 1 & 2 July, and a month later in Seville, Spain, in the Plaza de España on 21 & 22 July. On 28 January 2023, she gave a charity concert at the Auditorium Conciliazione in Rome, with Giorgia Todrani and Fiorello, an event created by the Bambino Gesù Onlus Foundation with the sponsorship of the Italian National Olympic Committee and the collaboration of Webuild, whose proceeds were donated to support the campaign (Mi prendo cura di te) I take care of you, for the creation of the Pediatric Palliative Care Center of the Bambino Gesù Hospital.

Pausini was honoured as the Latin Recording Academy Person of the Year prior to the 24th Annual Latin Grammy Awards in Seville, Spain in November 2023, making her the first Italian to receive the honour.

The Italian artist celebrated her 30-year career in music with three concerts in the Piazza San Marco in Venice on 30 June, 1 and 2 July 2023 and with two concerts in the Plaza de España, Seville on 21 and 22 July 2023 performing their hits and most iconic songs.

=== 2023–present: Anime Parallele and Sanremo hosting ===
Anime Parallele (Parallel Souls) is the fifteenth studio album by Pausini released worldwide on 27 October 2023. The album contains the song titled Davanti a te, the song that Laura sang together with Paolo Carta, on their wedding day, as their first wedding vows pronounced in the form of a song.

In mid-January 2026, Pausini was announced as the main co-host of the 76th Sanremo Music Festival alongside Carlo Conti. Shortly before Sanremo, she sang the Italian national anthem at the opening ceremony of the 2026 Winter Olympics in Milan.

Pausini was a performer in the 2026 FIFA World Cup closing ceremony.

== Artistry ==
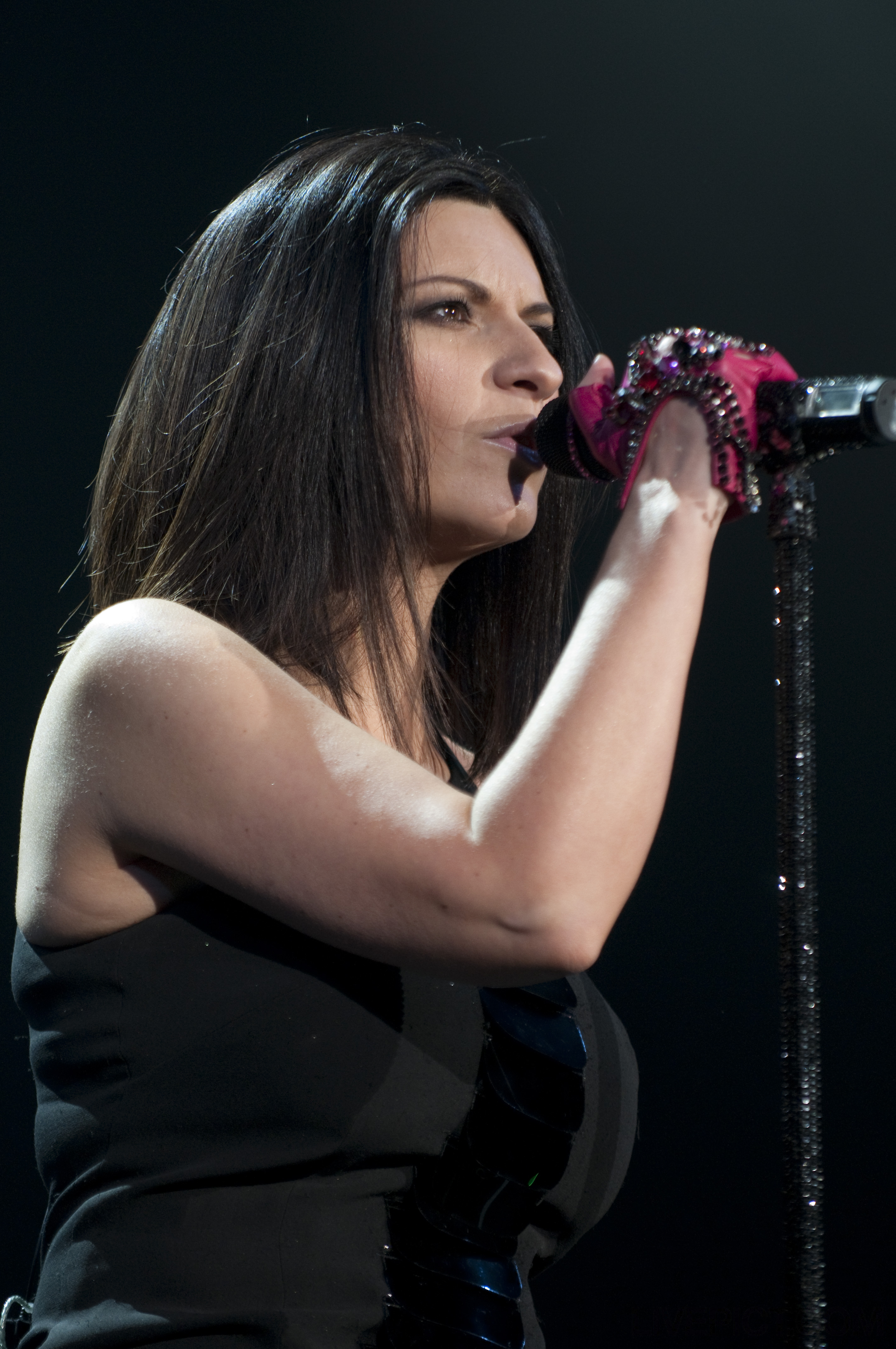
Pausini performing in 2009

Pausini is described as a mezzo-soprano with a classic and powerful voice. Due to her voice, Pausini has been compared by music critics to various female artists, including Milva.

At the beginning of her career, she was considered by music critics as a teen idol mainly singing about adolescent love affairs and problems. She was also strongly criticized for her songs, described as too melancholic and trivial. Starting from her 1998's La mia risposta / Mi respuesta, Italian music critics considered her as a more mature singer and later praised her simplicity and her voice, describing Pausini as an interpreter of her years.

Although Pausini is mainly a melodic pop singer, her musical style evolved during her career, with influences from various genres, including Latin music, soul music and rock music. In 2001, David Cazares of the South Florida Sun-Sentinel described Pausini's music as "an assortment of glossy and sentimental pop ballads backed by light rock instrumentation and synthesized strings". In 2006, The Washington Post's Achy Obejas wrote that Pausini is distinguished from other Latin pop singers by her sophistication and her European sensibilities. According to Musica e dischi's Antonio Orlando, the key elements in Pausini's style are romanticism, optimism, melancholy and surrounding melodies.

Starting from her 1996 album Le cose che vivi / Las cosas que vives, Pausini has also co-written most of her songs and starting from her 1998's La mia risposta / Mi respuesta she has been involved in the production of her albums.

== Personal life ==
Pausini left her hometown in 1995, when she moved to Milan with her partner, manager and producer Alfredo Cerruti Jr. Their relationship ended in 2002. Between 2002 and 2005 Pausini was romantically involved with her new manager, Gabriele Parisi.

Since 2005, Pausini has been in a relationship with Italian guitarist, composer, music producer, and former singer Paolo Carta. At the time, the relationship was controversial as Carta was still married to his first wife, Rebecca Galli, with whom he has three children. Pausini gave birth to their daughter on 8 February 2013. After 18 years together, Pausini and Carta got married on 22 March 2023.

Pausini describes herself as a Catholic woman, but expressed doubts about the Church's position on various themes, including contraception, abortion, divorce, premarital sex and gay rights. In September 2000 she explained her position during an interview to the Italian newspaper la Repubblica:

I really believe in God, and the Pope is the man that I most want to meet again in the world. I already met him in 1996. I just have a few doubts about the Catholic Church, such as the discrimination against homosexuals. I don't understand how they condemn racism, but at the same time take issue with gay people.

== Honours ==
– Commander Order of Merit of the Italian Republic: Awarded the third highest civil honour in Italy, by President Carlo Azeglio Ciampi on 6 February 2006.

== Discography ==
=== Studio albums ===
- Laura Pausini (1993)
- Laura (1994)
- Laura Pausini (1994)
- Le cose che vivi / Las cosas que vives (1996)
- La mia risposta / Mi respuesta (1998)
- Tra te e il mare / Entre tú y mil mares (2000)
- From the Inside (2002)
- Resta in ascolto / Escucha (2004)
- Io canto / Yo canto (2006)
- Primavera in anticipo / Primavera anticipada (2008)
- Inedito / Inédito (2011)
- Simili / Similares (2015)
- Laura Xmas / Laura Navidad (2016)
- Fatti sentire / Hazte sentir (2018)
- Anime Parallele / Almas Paralelas (2023)
- Io canto 2 / Yo canto 2 (2026)

== Tours ==
Tour	Year(s)	Releases	Format(s)
Laura Pausini on Tour	1993–94	—N/a	—N/a
World Wide Tour 1997	1997	—N/a	—N/a
La Mia Risposta World Tour	1999	—N/a	—N/a
E ritorno da te World Tour	2001–02	Live 2001-2002 World Tour	DVD
Laura Pausini Live	2005	Live in Paris 05	CD+DVD, 2× DVD, CD
Juntos en concierto 2006 (with Marc Anthony and Marco Antonio Solís)	2006	—N/a	—N/a
Io canto–Yo canto	2007	San Siro 2007	CD+DVD, CD, DVD
LP World Tour	2009	Laura Live World Tour 09	CD+DVD
Inedito World Tour	2011–12	Inedito (Special Edition) (includes a live bonus track and a live DVD)	CD+DVD
The Greatest Hits World Tour	2013–15	—N/a	—N/a
Simili Tour	2016	—N/a	—N/a
Fatti Sentire World Tour	2018	Fatti sentire ancora	CD+DVD
LB Stadi Tour (with Biagio Antonacci)	2019	—N/a	—N/a
World Tour 2023–2024	2023–24	—N/a	—N/a
World Tour 2026–2027	2026–27	—N/a	—N/a

== Filmography ==
Television

Year	Series	Role	Network	Notes
2009	Due	Herself	Rai Due	Music TV show – 1 episode as main performer and presenter, shared with Tiziano Ferro
2014	Laura Pausini 20 – My Story	Herself	Sky Italia	Autobiographical documentary – 1 episode
2014	Stasera Laura: ho creduto in un sogno	Herself	Rai Uno	Music TV show & concert – 1 episode, main performer and presenter
2014, 2017	La Voz... México	Herself	Canal de las Estrellas	Talent show – series 4 and series 6 judge and coach
2015	La Voz	Herself	Telecinco	Talent show – series 3 judge and coach
2015	La meraviglia di essere simili	Herself	Rai Uno	Documentary – 1 episode, TV special documenting her twelfth studio album, Simili
2015–2016	La Banda	Herself	Univision	Talent show – series 1 and series 2 judge
2016	Laura & Paola	Herself	Rai Uno	Variety show – 3 episodes, main presenter and performer, shared with Paola Cortellesi
2018	Lo Nuestro Awards	Herself	Univision	Music gala – co-host and performer
2018	Factor X	Herself	Telecinco	Talent show – series 3 judge
2020	La Voz	Herself	Antena 3	Talent show – series 7 judge and coach
2022	Laura Pausini – Piacere di conoscerti	Herself/Alternative herself	Amazon Prime Video	
2022	Eurovision Song Contest 2022	Herself	European Broadcasting Union	Song contest – co-host
2022	La Voz	Herself	Antena 3	Talent show – series 9 judge and coach
2022	Latin Grammy Awards	Herself	Univision, HBO Max	Music gala – co-host
2024	Gialappa Show	Herself	TV8	Comedy show – 1 episode, co-host
2024	Andrea Bocelli 30: The Celebration	Herself	Canale 5	Andrea Bocelli concert film and TV series, performing "She" with Bocelli and "Invece no" with Tiziano Ferro.
2026	Sanremo Music Festival 2026	Herself	Rai Uno	Song contest – co-host

== Awards ==
Awards and achievements
Grammy Awards
Preceded by Marc Anthony for Amar Sin Mentiras	Grammy Award for Best Latin Pop Album; 2006 for Escucha	Succeeded by Ricardo Arjona for Adentro joint with Julieta Venegas for Limón y sal
Latin Grammy Awards
Preceded by Rosario Flores for De mil colores	Latin Grammy Award for Best Pop Vocal Album, Female; 2005 for Escucha	Succeeded by Shakira for Fijación Oral Vol. 1
Preceded by Shakira for Fijación Oral Vol. 1	Latin Grammy Award for Best Pop Vocal Album, Female; 2007 for Yo canto	Succeeded by Kany García for Cualquier Día
Preceded by Kany García for Cualquier Día	Latin Grammy Award for Best Pop Vocal Album, Female; 2009 for Primavera anticipada	Succeeded by Nelly Furtado for Mi Plan
Preceded by Lila Downs for Salón, Lágrimas y Deseo	Latin Grammy Award for Best Traditional Pop Vocal Album; 2018 for Hazte sentir	Succeeded by Fonseca for Agustín
Preceded by Marco Antonio Solis	Latin Recording Academy Person of the Year; 2023	Succeeded by Carlos Vives
Preceded by Andrés Cepeda for Bogotá	Latin Grammy Award for Best Traditional Pop Vocal Album; 2026 for Yo canto 2	Succeeded by
Golden Globe Awards
Preceded by Elton John and Bernie Taupin for "(I'm Gonna) Love Me Again"	Golden Globe Award for Best Original Song; 2021 for "Io sì (Seen)"	Succeeded by Billie Eilish & Finneas O'Connell for "No Time to Die"

== See also ==
- List of estimated best-selling Italian music artists
- List of best-selling Latin music artists

== Notes ==
1. Sources indicate different locations for Pausini's birth—The Comunes of Faenza and Solarolo, Ravenna, Italy. One state source, The Presidency of the Italian Republic, cites Faenza as the location of her birth. In media interviews, however, Pausini consistently names Solarolo as her birthplace. Solarolo is located 5 miles from Faenza.

Preceded by (Netherlands) Chantal Janzen, Edsilia Rombley, Jan Smit and Nikkie de Jager	Eurovision Song Contest presenter 2022; With: Alessandro Cattelan and Mika	Succeeded by (United Kingdom) Alesha Dixon, Hannah Waddingham, (Ukraine) Julia Sanina and (Republic of Ireland) Graham Norton (final)
