= Laura Pausini discography =

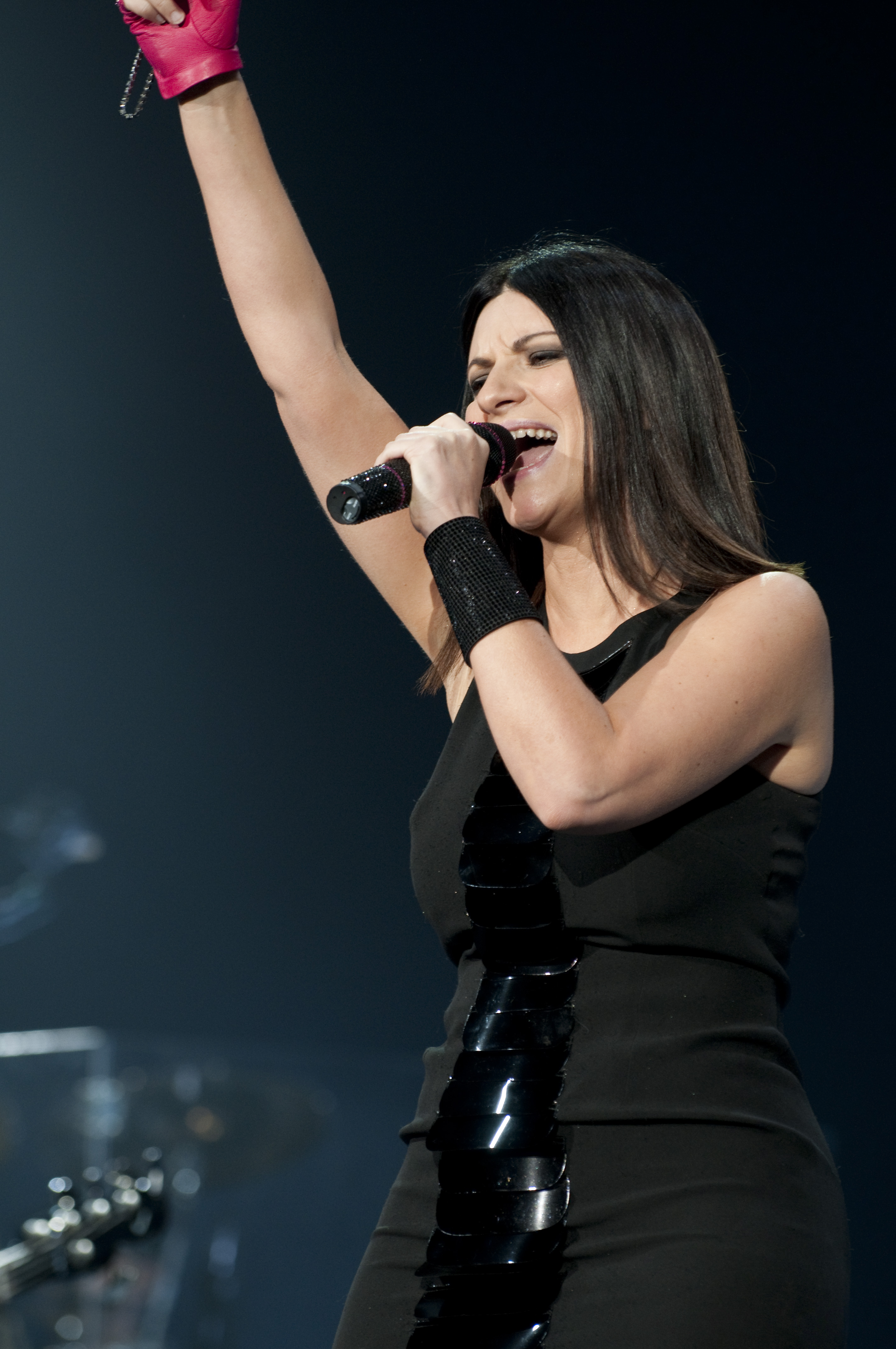
- Pausini performing in April 2009
- Studio albums: 16
- Live albums: 3
- Compilation albums: 3
- Singles: 66
- Video albums: 4
- Music videos: 61
- Featured video albums: 1

The discography of Italian singer Laura Pausini consists of sixteen studio albums, one compilation album released for the Anglophone market only, two international greatest hits album, three live albums and five video albums, including the live DVD Amiche per l'Abruzzo, released as part of the all-female Italian ensemble of the same name.

Pausini's first single, "La solitudine", was released by CGD Records in February 1993, and peaked at number five on the Italian Musica e dischi Singles Chart. The song was included in Pausini's eponymous debut album, released in Italy on 23 April 1993. The album peaked at number 6 on the Italian Albums Chart, and was later released in many other European countries, peaking at number three on the Dutch Albums Chart and selling three million copies worldwide.

Pausini's second album, Laura, was released in 1994 and sold more than four million copies worldwide. In November of that same year, Pausini's Spanish-language debut Laura Pausini, featuring ten translated versions of songs selected from her previous albums, was released in Spain and Latin America. The album was certified diamond by the Association of Phonographic and Videographic of Spain, later renamed as PROMUSICAE, and became the best-selling album of 1994 in Spain.

Starting from 1996's Le cose che vivi—Las cosas que vives in Spanish—all of her studio albums have been released both in Italian and Spanish, except From the Inside, Pausini's English debut album, which was first released in the United States by Atlantic Records, in late 2002. From the Inside was later released in Europe and South America too, but it wasn't as successful as her previous albums, selling 800,000 copies worldwide. Pausini's studio albums also include La mia risposta (1998, released as Mi respuesta in Spanish), Tra te e il mare (2000, released as Entre tú y mil mares in Spanish), Resta in ascolto (2005), which won a Grammy Award for its Spanish-language counterpart Escucha, the cover album Io canto (2006, Yo canto for the Hispanic market), Primavera in anticipo (2008, Primavera anticipada in Spanish), Inedito (released in 2011 with its Spanish version, Inédito), and Simili (2015, Similares in Spanish).

Her first worldwide released greatest hits album was released in 2001. Titled The Best of Laura Pausini: E ritorno da te in its Italian-language version and Lo mejor de Laura Pausini: Volveré junto a ti in its Spanish edition, the album became one of Pausini's biggest commercial successes, selling 700,000 copies in Italy and 800,000 copies in France. A second international compilation album, 20 - The Greatest Hits was released in 2013, celebrating the 20th anniversary of her debut. In 2016, Pausini also produced her first Christmas album, released both as Laura Xmas and as Laura Navidad.

During her career, Pausini recorded duets with several Italian and international artists, including Ray Charles, Michael Bublé, Juanes, Tiziano Ferro, Andrea Bocelli, Hélène Ségara, James Blunt, Kylie Minogue, Gloria Estefan, Luciano Pavarotti, and more recently Lazza and Robbie Williams.

== Albums ==
=== Studio albums ===
List of albums, with selected chart positions, sales, and certifications
Title(s)	Album details	Peak chart positions										Sales	Certifications
Title(s)	Album details	ITA	BEL (WA)	FIN	FRA	GER	NLD	SPA	SWE	SWI	US Latin	Sales	Certifications
Laura Pausini	Released: 23 April 1993; Label: CGD Records; Formats: MC, CD, LP; Language: Italian	6	29	—	35	—	3	—	—	—	—	ITA: 400,000; World: 3,000,000	FIMI: Gold; BRMA: Platinum; IFPI SWI: Gold; NVPI: Platinum; SNEP: Gold
Laura	Released: 26 February 1994; Label: CGD Records; Formats: MC, CD, LP; Language: Italian	2	33	7	21	—	1	—	—	4	—	World: 4,000,000	BRMA: Gold; IFPI SWI: 2× Platinum; NVPI: Platinum
Laura Pausini	Released: 22 November 1994; Label: CGD Records; Formats: MC, CD, LP; Language: Spanish	—	—	—	—	—	—	1	—	—	31	SPA: 1,000,000; World: 8,000,000	PROMUSICAE: 11× Platinum
Le cose che vivi; Las cosas que vives	Released: 12 September 1996; Label: CGD East West; Formats: MC, CD, LP; Language: Italian, Spanish	2	3	—	15	—	6	2	2	1	15	ITA: 344,000; SPA: 300,000; World: 3,500,000	FIMI: 2× Platinum; BRMA: Gold; IFPI SWE: Gold; NVPI: Gold; PROMUSICAE: 4× Platinum
La mia risposta; Mi respuesta	Released: 15 October 1998; Label: CGD East West; Formats: MC, CD, LP; Language: Italian, Spanish	1	26	—	64	66	34	8	30	3	23	World: 2,000,000	FIMI: 2× Platinum; IFPI SWI: Gold; PROMUSICAE: 2× Platinum
Tra te e il mare; Entre tú y mil mares	Released: 15 September 2000; Label: CGD East West; Formats: MC, CD, LP; Language: Italian, Spanish	2	38	4	—	34	40	3	41	2	26	ITA: 400,000; FIN: 29,059; World: 4,000,000	FIMI: 4× Platinum; IFPI FIN: Gold; IFPI SWI: Platinum; PROMUSICAE: Platinum; RIAA: Platinum (Latin)
From the Inside	Released: 5 November 2002; Label: CGD East West; Formats: MC, CD; Language: English	3	38	3	34	55	32	12	24	4	—	FIN: 10,514; US: 33,000; World: 800,000	IFPI SWI: Gold; PROMUSICAE: Gold
Resta in ascolto; Escucha	Released: 22 October 2004; Label: Warner Music; Formats: CD; Language: Italian, Spanish	1	9	18	7	84	19	3	22	2	20	ITA: 400,000	FIMI: 4× Platinum; IFPI SWI: 2× Platinum; PROMUSICAE: Gold; RIAA: Platinum (Latin); SNEP: Gold
Io canto; Yo canto	Released: 11 November 2006; Label: Warner Music; Formats: CD, download; Language: Italian, Spanish	1	8	33	15	—	66	15	—	1	22	ITA: 650,000; World: 2,000,000	FIMI: 6× Platinum; IFPI SWI: Platinum; SNEP: Gold
Primavera in anticipo; Primavera anticipada	Released: 14 November 2008; Label: Warner Music; Formats: CD, CD+DVD, download; Language: Italian, Spanish	1	22	25	27	34	59	10	43	4	15	ITA: 500,000; World: 1,500,000	FIMI: 3× Platinum; IFPI SWI: Platinum
Inedito; Inédito	Released: 11 November 2011; Label: Warner Music; Formats: CD, download; Language: Italian, Spanish	1	13	—	63	47	30	4	—	2	17	World: 1,000,000	FIMI: 6× Platinum; IFPI SWI: Gold
Simili; Similares	Released: 6 November 2015; Label: Warner Music; Formats: CD, CD+DVD, download, 2× LP; Language: Italian, Spanish	1	7	—	51	58	33	7	—	4	6		FIMI: 3× Platinum
Laura Xmas; Laura Navidad	Released: 4 November 2016; Label: Warner Music; Formats: CD, CD+DVD, download, 2× LP; Language: English, Spanish, French, Italian	1	41	—	182	—	—	15	—	19	—		FIMI: 2× Platinum
Fatti sentire; Hazte sentir	Released: 16 March 2018; Label: Warner Music; Formats: CD, CD+DVD, download, 2× LP; Language: Italian, Spanish	1	3	—	38	25	78	7	—	2	35		FIMI: 3× Platinum
Anime parallele; Almas paralelas	Released: 27 October 2023; Label: Warner Music; Formats: CD, download, 2× LP; Language: Italian, Spanish	2	12	—	102	—	—	5	—	7	—		FIMI: Gold
Io canto 2; Yo canto 2	Released: 6 February 2026; Label: Warner Music; Formats: CD, download; Language: Italian, Spanish	3	4	—	105	—	—	5	—	7	—		
"—" denotes albums that did not chart or were not released.

=== Compilation albums ===
List of albums, with selected chart positions, sales, and certifications
Title(s)	Album details	Peak chart positions										Sales	Certifications
Title(s)	Album details	ITA	BEL (WA)	FIN	FRA	GER	NLD	SPA	SWE	SWI	US Latin	Sales	Certifications
Laura Pausini	Released: 11 May 1995; Label: CGD Records; Formats: MC, CD; Language: Italian, English	—	—	—	—	—	—	—	—	—	—		
The Best of Laura Pausini: E ritorno da te; Lo mejor de Laura Pausini: Volveré junto a ti	Released: 8 October 2001; Label: Atlantic Records; Formats: MC, CD; Language: Italian, Spanish	1	9	6	— (Note: As a compilation album, The Best of Laura Pausini: E ritorno da te was not eligible to chart on the French Albums Chart, but it peaked at number 2 on the French Compilations Chart.)	44	28	6	27	3	9	ITA: 700,000; FIN: 33,027; FRA: 800,000; World: 3,000,000	FIMI: Platinum; BRMA: Gold; IFPI FIN: Platinum; IFPI SWI: 2× Platinum; PROMUSICAE: Gold; RIAA: Platinum (Latin); SNEP: 2× Platinum
20 - The Greatest Hits; 20 - Grandes Exitos	Released: 12 November 2013; Label: Atlantic Records; Formats: CD, download; Language: Italian, Spanish	1	12	—	47	—	53	6	—	8	14	World: 1,000,000	FIMI: 3× Platinum; IFPI SWI: Gold; PROMUSICAE: Gold
"—" denotes albums that did not chart or were not released

=== Live albums ===
List of live albums, with selected chart positions, sales, and certifications
Title	Album details	Peak chart positions						Sales	Certifications
Title	Album details	ITA	BEL (WA)	FRA	SPA	SWI	US Latin	Sales	Certifications
Live in Paris 05	Released: 29 November 2005; Labels: Warner; Formats: CD, CD+DVD; Language: Italian	8	57	68	—	24	—	ITA: 160,000	
San Siro 2007	Released: 30 November 2007; Labels: Warner; Formats: CD, CD+DVD; Language: Italian	5	57	135	—	26	—	ITA: 120,000	
Laura Live World Tour 09; Laura Live Gira Mundial 09	Released: 27 November 2009; Labels: Warner; Formats: CD, CD+DVD, digital download; Language: Italian, Spanish	2	53	91	32	14	33		FIMI: 4× Platinum
"—" denotes albums that did not chart or were not released

=== Video albums ===
List of video albums, with selected chart positions on the video albums charts
Title	Album details	Peak chart positions		
Title	Album details	ITA	BEL (WA)	SPA
Video Collection 1993-99	Released: 3 December 1999; Format: VHS; Compilation of music videos; Language: Italian, Spanish	—	—	—
Live 2001-2002 World Tour	Released: 30 November 2002; Labels: Atlantic Records; Formats: DVD; Language: Italian, English	11	5	—
Live in Paris 05	Released: 25 November 2005; Labels: Warner; Format: DVD; Language: Italian, Spanish	4	—	—
San Siro 2007	Released: 30 November 2007; Labels: Warner; Formats: DVD; Language: Italian, Spanish	3	—	10
"—" denotes video albums that did not chart or were not released

=== Featured video albums ===
List of albums, with selected sales and chart positions on the video albums charts
Title	Album details	Peak chart positions	Sales
Title	Album details	ITA	Sales
Amiche per l'Abruzzo	Released: 22 June 2010 (Italy); Format: DVD; Live album by Laura Pausini & various Italian female artists; Language: Italian	1	ITA: 250,000

== Singles ==
=== 1993–1999 ===
List of singles, with selected chart positions, showing year released and album name
Single	Year	Peak chart positions									Certifications	Album
Single	Year	ITA	BEL (FL)	BEL (WA)	FIN^{[X]}	FRA	GER	NLD	SWI	US Latin	Certifications	Album
"La solitudine"	1993	1	1	—	—	5	—	2	—	—	FIMI: Platinum; NVPI: Platinum	Laura Pausini (1993)
"Non c'è"	1993	—	—	—	—	—	76	—	—	—		Laura Pausini (1993)
"Perché non torna più"	1993	—	—	—	—	—	—	—	—	—		Laura Pausini (1993)
"Strani amori"	1994	2	2	—	—	43	—	4	—	—	FIMI: Gold	Laura
"Gente"	1994	—	23	—	—	43	—	41	—	—		Laura
"La soledad"	1994	—	—	—	—	—	—	—	—	22		Laura Pausini (1994)
"Se fue"	1994	—	—	—	—	—	—	—	—	24	PROMUSICAE: Gold	Laura Pausini (1994)
"Lettera"	1994	—	41	—	—	—	—	43	—	—		Laura
"Lui non sta con te"	1994	—	—	—	—	—	—	—	—	—		Laura
"Amores extraños"	1995	—	—	—	—	—	—	—	—	7		Laura Pausini (1994)
"Gente" (Spanish version)	1995	—	—	—	—	—	—	—	—	13		Laura Pausini (1994)
"El no està por ti" (Spain only)	1995	—	—	—	—	—	—	—	—	—		Laura Pausini (1994)
"La solitudine (Loneliness)"	1995	—	—	—	—	—	—	—	—	—		Laura Pausini (1995)
"Incancellabile"; "Inolvidable"	1996	—	13	17	—	—	—	37	—	13		Le cose che vivi; Las cosas que vives
"Le cose che vivi"; "Las cosas que vives"	1997	—	— (Note: "Le cose che vivi" did not chart on the Ultratop 50 in the Flanders, but it peaked at number 16 on the Ultratip chart.)	—	—	—	—	99	—	6		Le cose che vivi; Las cosas que vives
"Ascolta il tuo cuore"; "Escucha a tu corazón"	1997	—	—	—	—	—	—	—	—	15		Le cose che vivi; Las cosas que vives
"Dos enamorados"; "Apaixonados como nós"	1997	—	—	—	—	—	—	—	—	37		Le cose che vivi; Las cosas que vives
"Seamisai"	1997	—	—	—	—	—	—	—	—	—		Le cose che vivi; Las cosas que vives
"Un'emergenza d'amore"; "Emergencia de amor"	1998	—	—	—	22	—	—	77	43	23		La mia risposta; Mi respuesta
"In assenza di te"; "En ausencia de ti"	1999	20	—	—	—	42	—	—	—	—		La mia risposta; Mi respuesta
"La mia risposta"; "Mi respuesta"	1999	18	—	—	—	—	—	—	—	—		La mia risposta; Mi respuesta
"One More Time"	1999	42	—	—	—	—	—	76	—	—		Message in a Bottle Soundtrack
"—" denotes singles that did not chart or were not released

=== 2000–2004 ===
List of singles, with selected chart positions, showing year released and album name
Single	Year	Peak chart positions										Certifications	Album
Single	Year	ITA	BEL (FL)	BEL (WA)	FIN	FRA	GER	NLD	SPA	SWI	US Latin	Certifications	Album
"Tra te e il mare"; "Entre tú y mil mares"	2000	4	—	— (Note: "Tra te e il mare" did not chart on the Ultratop 50 in Wallonia, but it peaked at number 9 on the Ultratip chart.)	16	16	16	82	—	42	13		Tra te e il mare; Entre tú y mil mares
"Il mio sbaglio più grande"; "Un error de los grandes"	2001	20	—	—	11	—	—	93	—	86	—		Tra te e il mare; Entre tú y mil mares
"Fidati di me"; "Fíate de mi"	2001	—	—	—	—	—	—	—	—	—	—		Tra te e il mare; Entre tú y mil mares
"Volevo dirti che ti amo"; "Quiero decirte que te amo"	2001	—	—	—	—	—	—	—	—	—	36		Tra te e il mare; Entre tú y mil mares
"E ritorno da te"; "Volveré junto a ti"	2001	3	—	—	11	—	38	20	—	47	11		The Best of Laura Pausini; Lo mejor de Laura Pausini
"Una storia che vale"; "Dos historias iguales"	2002	—	—	—	40	—	—	—	—	—	—		The Best of Laura Pausini; Lo mejor de Laura Pausini
"Surrender"	2002	7	25	39	3	—	—	31	—	34	—		From the Inside
"I Need Love"	2003	—	—	—	46	—	—	—	—	100	—		From the Inside
"It's Not Good-Bye"	2003	—	—	—	43	—	—	—	—	—	—		From the Inside
"If That's Love"	2003	—	—	—	—	—	—	—	—	—	—		From the Inside
"Resta in ascolto"; "Escucha atento"	2004	1	— (Note: "Resta in ascolto" did not chart on the Ultratop 50 in the Flanders, but it peaked at number 15 on the Ultratip chart.)	35	39	—	—	—	3	25	17		Resta in ascolto; Escucha
"Vivimi"; "Víveme"	2004	—	—	— (Note: "Vivimi" did not chart on the Ultratop 50 in Wallonia, but it peaked at number 15 on the Ultratip chart.)	—	—	—	—	—	38	6	FIMI: Gold	Resta in ascolto; Escucha
"—" denotes singles that did not chart or were not released

=== 2005–2009 ===
List of singles, with selected chart positions, showing year released and album name
Single	Year	Peak chart positions										Certifications	Album
Single	Year	ITA	AUT	BEL (FL)	BEL (WA)	FIN	FRA	GER	SPA	SWI	US Latin	Certifications	Album
"Come se non fosse stato mai amore"; "Como si no nos hubiéramos amado"	2005	—	—	—	—	—	—	—	—	—	10		Resta in ascolto; Escucha
"Benedetta passione"; "Bendecida pasión"	2005	—	—	—	—	—	—	—	—	—	—		Resta in ascolto; Escucha
"La prospettiva di me"; "Mi prespectiva"	2005	—	—	—	—	—	—	—	—	—	—		Live in Paris 05
"Il tuo nome in maiuscolo"; "Tu nombre en mayúsculas"	2006	—	—	—	—	—	—	—	—	—	37		Live in Paris 05
"Uguale a lei (She)"	2006	— (Note: "Uguale a lei (She)" was only released as a digital single, and therefore was not allowed to chart on the Italian Singles Chart, which was based on physical sales only until 1 January 2008. However, the song charted at number 6 on the very first Italian Top Digital Downloads chart in April 2006.)	—	—	—	—	—	—	—	—	—		non-album single
"Io canto"; "Yo canto"	2006	1	—	— (Note: "Io canto" did not chart on the Ultratop 50 in the Flanders, but it peaked at number 15 on the Ultratip chart.)	11	50	26	—	—	20	— (Note: "Yo canto" did not chart on the Billboard Hot Latin Songs, but peaked at number 32 on the Latin Pop Airplay Chart.)		Io canto; Yo canto
"Spaccacuore"; "Dispárame, dispara"	2007	— (Note: "Spaccacuore" was only released as a digital single, and therefore was not allowed to chart on the Italian Singles Chart, which was based on physical sales only until 1 January 2008. However, the song peaked at number 13 on the Italian Top Digital Downloads chart in May 2007.)	—	—	—	—	—	—	—	—	—		Io canto; Yo canto
"Non me lo so spiegare"; "No me lo puedo explicar"; (with Tiziano Ferro)	2007	— (Note: "Non me lo so spiegare" was only released as a digital single, and therefore was not allowed to chart on the Italian Singles Chart, which was based on physical sales only until 1 January 2008. However, the song peaked at number 13 on the Italian Top Digital Downloads chart in May 2007.)	—	—	—	—	—	—	—	—	—		Io canto; Yo canto
"Destinazione paradiso"; "Destino paraíso"	2007	14 (Note: "Destinazione paradiso" was only released as a digital single, and therefore was not allowed to chart on the Italian Singles Chart until 1 January 2008, when FIMI started to include digital sales on its chart. The song peaked at number 8 on the Italian Top Digital Download in November 2007; in January 2008, when the Top Digital Downloads replaced the physical sales chart as the Italian official singles chart, "Destinazione paradiso" debuted and peaked at number 14.)	—	—	—	—	—	—	—	—	—		San Siro 2007
"La mia banda suona il rock"; "Y mi banda toca el rock"	2007	— (Note: "Y mi banda toca el rock" was only released as a digital single, and therefore was not allowed to chart on the Italian Singles Chart until 1 January 2008, when it started to include digital sales. The song peaked at number 21 on the Italian Top Digital Download in November 2007.)	—	—	—	—	—	—	—	25	— (Note: "Y mi banda toca el rock" did not chart on the Billboard Hot Latin Songs, but peaked at number 29 on the Latin Pop Airplay Chart.)		San Siro 2007
"Invece no"; "En cambio no"	2008	2	—	—	—	—	—	—	47	52	28		Primavera in anticipo; Primavera anticipada
"Primavera in anticipo (It Is My Song)"; "Primavera anticipada (It Is My Song)"; (with James Blunt)	2009	5	1	— (Note: "Primavera in anticipo (It Is My Song)" did not chart on the Ultratop 50 in the Flanders, but it peaked at number 9 on the Ultratip chart.)	23	—	—	16	21	5	—	IFPI AUT: Gold; IFPI SWI: Gold	Primavera in anticipo; Primavera anticipada
"Un fatto ovvio"; "Un hecho obvio"	2009	14	—	—	—	—	—	—	—	—	—		Primavera in anticipo; Primavera anticipada
"Con la musica alla radio"; "Con la musica en la radio"	2009	10	—	—	—	—	—	—	—	—	—	FIMI: Gold	Laura Live World Tour 09; Laura Live Gira Mundial 09
"Non sono lei"; "Ella no soy"	2009	32	—	—	—	—	—	—	—	—	—		Laura Live World Tour 09; Laura Live Gira Mundial 09
"—" denotes singles that did not chart or were not released

=== 2010–present ===
List of singles, with selected chart positions, showing year released and album name
Single	Year	Peak chart positions								Certifications	Album
Single	Year	ITA	BEL (WA)	MEX	SPA	SWI	US	US Latin	WW	Certifications	Album
"Casomai"; "Menos mal"	2010	—	—	—	—	—	—	—	—		Laura Live World Tour 09; Laura Live Gira Mundial 09
"Benvenuto"; "Bienvenido"	2011	1	— (Note: "Benvenuto" did not chart on the Ultratop 50 in Wallonia, but it peaked at number 8 on the Ultratip chart.)	—	15	49	—	41	—	FIMI: Platinum	Inedito; Inédito
"Non ho mai smesso"; "Jamás abandoné"	2011	15	—	—	—	—	—	— (Note: "Jamás abandoné" did not chart on the Billboard Hot Latin Songs, but peaked at number 33 on the Latin Pop Airplay Chart.)	—	FIMI: Gold	Inedito; Inédito
"Bastava"; "Bastaba"	2012	24	—		— 50	—	—	—	—		Inedito; Inédito
"Mi tengo"	2012	—	—	—	—	—	—	—	—		Inedito; Inédito
"Le cose che non mi aspetto"; "Las cosas que no me espero"; (solo or featuring Carlos Baute)	2012	43	—	—	41	—	—	—	—		Inedito; Inédito
"Celeste"	2012	27	—	—	—	—	—	—	—	FIMI: Gold	Inedito; Inédito
"La solitudine" (2013 medley version)	2013	14	—	—	—	—	—	—	—		non-album single
"Limpido"; "Limpio"; (featuring Kylie Minogue)	2013	1	— (Note: "Limpido" did not chart on the Ultratop 50 in Wallonia, but it peaked at number 18 on the Ultratip chart.)	—	—	66	—	—	—	FIMI: Gold	20 – The Greatest Hits; 20 – Grandes éxitos
"Se non te"; "Sino a ti"; (Solo or with Thalía)	2013	8	—	—	—	—	—	—	—		20 – The Greatest Hits; 20 – Grandes éxitos
"Víveme" (featuring Alejandro Sanz)	2013	—	—	—	20	—	—	— (Note: The 2013 version of "Viveme", recorded with Alejandro Sanz, did not chart on the Billboard Hot Latin Songs, but peaked at number 24 on the Latin Airplay Chart)	—		20 – The Greatest Hits; 20 – Grandes éxitos
"Dove resto solo io"; "Donde quedo solo yo"; (solo or featuring Álex Ubago)	2014	41	—	—	—	—	—	—	—		20 – The Greatest Hits; 20 – Grandes éxitos
"Se fue" (featuring Marc Anthony)	2014	—	—	—	—	—	—	25	—		20 – The Greatest Hits; 20 – Grandes éxitos
"Lato destro del cuore"; "Lado derecho del corazón"	2015	3	—	—	15	—	—	— (Note: "Lado derecho del corazón" did not chart on the Billboard Hot Latin Songs, but peaked at number 26 on the Latin Pop Airplay Chart.)	—	FIMI: Gold	Simili; Similares
"Simili"; "Similares"	2015	20	—	—	—	—	—	—	—	FIMI: 2× Platinum	Simili; Similares
"Nella porta accanto"; "En la puerta de al lado"	2015	—	—	—	—	—	—	—	—		Simili; Similares
"Innamorata"; "Enamorada"	2016	67	—	—	—	—	—	— (Note: "Y mi banda toca el rock" did not chart on the Billboard Hot Latin Songs, but peaked at number 28 on the Latin Pop Airplay Chart.)	—	FIMI: Gold	Simili; Similares
"Ho creduto a me"; "He creído en mí"	2016	—	—	—	—	—	—	—	—		Simili; Similares
"Non è detto"; "Nadie ha dicho"; (solo or featuring Gente De Zona)	2018	7	—	—	—	32	—	— (Note: "Nadie ha dicho" did not chart on the Billboard Hot Latin Songs, but peaked at number 21 on the Latin Pop Airplay Chart.)	—	FIMI: Gold	Fatti sentire; Hazte sentir
"Novo"; "Nuevo"	2018	—	—	—	— (Note: "Nuevo" did not chart on the Spanish Singles Top 100, but it peaked at number 31 on the Spanish Airplay Chart.)	—	—	—	—		Fatti sentire; Hazte sentir
"Frasi a metà"; "Verdades a medias"; (solo or with Bebe)	2018	73	—	—	— (Note: "Verdades a medias" did not chart on the Spanish Singles Top 100, but it peaked at number 27 on the Spanish Airplay Chart.)	—	—	—	—		Fatti sentire; Hazte sentir
"E.STA.A.TE"; "ESTÁ.ALLÁ"	2018	—	—	—	—	—	—	—	—		Fatti sentire; Hazte sentir
"La soluzione"; "La solución"; (solo or featuring Carlos Rivera)	2018	—	—	—	— (Note: "La solución" did not chart on the Spanish Singles Top 100, but it peaked at number 40 on the Spanish Airplay Chart.)	—	—	—	—		Fatti sentire; Hazte sentir
"Il coraggio di andare"; "El valor de seguir adelante"; (solo or featuring Biagio Antonacci)	2018	—	—	—	— (Note: "El valor de seguir adelante" did not chart on the Spanish Singles Top 100, but it peaked at number 36 on the Spanish Airplay Chart.)	—	—	—	—	FIMI: Gold	Fatti sentire; Hazte sentir
"Io sì (Seen)"	2020	71	—	—	—	—	—	—	—	FIMI: Gold	Non-album singles
"Scatola"; "Caja"	2022	47	—	—	—	—	—	—	—	FIMI: Gold	Non-album singles
"Un buon inizio"; "Un buen inicio"	2023	75	—	—	—	— (Note: "Un buen inicio" did not chart on the Spanish Singles Top 100, but it peaked at number 30 on the Spanish Airplay Chart.)	—	— (Note: "Un buen inicio" did not chart on the Billboard Hot Latin Songs, but peaked at number 13 on the Latin Pop Airplay Chart.)	—		Anime parallele; Almas paralelas
"Il primo passo sulla Luna"; "El primer paso en la Luna"	2023	—	—	—	— (Note: "El primer paso en la Luna" did not chart on the Spanish Singles Top 100, but it peaked at number 40 on the Spanish Airplay Chart.)	—	—	—	—		Anime parallele; Almas paralelas
"Durare"; "Durar"	2023	71	—	—	—	—	—	— (Note: "Durar" did not chart on the Billboard Hot Latin Songs, but peaked at number 21 on the Latin Pop Airplay Chart.)	—		Anime parallele; Almas paralelas
"Ciao"; "Chao"	2024	—	—	—	—	—	—	— (Note: "Chao" did not chart on the Billboard Hot Latin Songs, but peaked at number 19 on the Latin Pop Airplay Chart.)	—		Anime parallele; Almas paralelas
"Se fue" (Rauw Alejandro and Laura Pausini)	2024	—	—	19	5	—	82	7	57	AMPROFON: Platinum; PROMUSICAE: Gold	Cosa Nuestra
"Turista"	2025	—	—	—	—	—	—	—	—		Yo canto 2
"La mia storia tra le dita"; "Mi historia entre tus dedos"; "Quem de nós dois?"; "Mon histoire entre les doigts"	2025	—	—	—	— (Note: "Mi historia entre tus dedos" did not chart on the Spanish Singles Top 100, but it peaked at number 42 on the Spanish Airplay Chart.)	—	—	—	—		Io canto 2; Yo canto 2
"La dernière chanson (Due vite)" (featuring Julien Lieb)	2026	—	—	—	—	—	—	—	—		Io canto 2
"16 marzo" (featuring Achille Lauro)	2026	—	—	—	—	—	—	—	—		Io canto 2
"—" denotes singles that did not chart or were not released

=== As featured artist ===
List of singles, with selected chart positions, showing year released and album name
Single	Year	Peak chart positions								Certifications	Album
Single	Year	ITA	BEL (WA)	FIN	FRA	SPA	SWI	UK	US Latin	Certifications	Album
"Sei solo tu"; "Tan sólo tú"; (Nek featuring Laura Pausini)	2002	3	—	37	55	—	46	—	36		Le cose da difendere; Las cosas que defenderé
"On n'oublie jamais rien, on vit avec" (Hélène Ségara and Laura Pausini)	2003	—	2	36	3	—	3	—	—	BRMA: Gold; SNEP: Gold	Humaine
"Todo Para Ti" (Michael Jackson featuring Various Artists)	2003	—	—	—	—	—	—	—	—		Charity single
"Surrender to Love" (Ray Charles featuring Laura Pausini)	2005	—	—	—	—	—	—	—	—		Genius & Friends
"Vivere (Dare to Live)"; "Vive ya (Dare to Live)"; (Andrea Bocelli featuring Laura Pausini)	2007	17	—	—	—	—	—	—	20		The Best of Andrea Bocelli: Vivere; Lo mejor de Andrea Bocelli: Vivire
"Domani 21/04.09" (Artisti Uniti per l'Abruzzo)	2009	1	—	—	—	—	—	—	—	FIMI: 2× Platinum	Charity singles
"Gracias a la vida" (Artists for Chile)	2010	—	—	—	—	—	—	—	—		Charity singles
"Donna d'Onna" (live) (Laura Pausini, Gianna Nannini, Giorgia, Elisa & Fiorella Mannoia)	2010	8	—	—	—	—	—	—	—		Amiche per l'Abruzzo
"Roma" (Luis Fonsi featuring Laura Pausini)	2024	—	—	—	—	—	— (Note: "Roma" did not chart on the Spanish Singles Top 100, but it peaked at number 36 on the Spanish Airplay Chart.)	—	— (Note: "Roma" did not chart on the Billboard Hot Latin Songs, but peaked at number 15 on the Latin Pop Airplay Chart.)		El Viaje
"Zeri in più (Locura)" (Lazza featuring Laura Pausini)	2024	1	—	—	—	—	—	—	—	FIMI: Gold	Locura
"Desire (Official FIFA Anthem)" (Robbie Williams featuring Laura Pausini)	2025	—	—	—	—	—	—	— (Note: "Desire" did not enter the UK Singles Chart, but peaked at number 85 on the UK Singles Downloads and number 91 on the UK Singles Sales charts.)	—		Britpop
"—" denotes singles that did not chart or were not released

Notes Laura Pausini has never had any singles on the Finnish Top 20 Singles Chart, but she has charted on the Finnish Top 50 Hits (50 Hittiä) Chart that was published by the Finnish Magazine Rumba until December 2007. That chart combined singles sales with radio airplay (like Billboard Hot 100 and Dutch Top 40). Therefore, the chart positions listed here are for the Finnish Top 50 Hits Chart. The Chart positions from 2008 forward are from the Official Finnish Nielsen Music Control Airplay Chart.

== Other appearances ==
List of other album appearances
Contribution	Year	Album
"Tu che m'hai preso il cuor" (Luciano Pavarotti featuring Laura Pausini — Live)	1999	Pavarotti & Friends for the Children of Guatemala and Kosovo
"We Are the World" (Luciano Pavarotti & Friends — Live)	1999	Pavarotti & Friends for the Children of Guatemala and Kosovo
"Dime" (José el Francés featuring Laura Pausini)	2002	Jugando al amor
"Entre tú y mil mares" (Biagio Antonacci featuring Laura Pausini)	2003	Cuànto tiempo... y ahora
"Pagàno" (Elio e le Storie Tese featuring Laura Pausini)	2003	Cicciput
"Como tú y como yo" (Sin Bandera featuring Laura Pausini)	2005	Mañana
"La loi du silence" (Johnny Hallyday featuring Laura Pausini — Live)	2006	Flashback tour (DVD)
"Te amaré" (Miguel Bosé featuring Laura Pausini)	2007	Papito
"Todo vuelve a empezar" (Luis Fonsi featuring Laura Pausini)	2008	Palabras del Silencio
"Paris au mois d'aout" / "Parigi in agosto" (Charles Aznavour featuring Laura Pausini)	2008	Duos
"Prendo te" (Arthur Hanlon featuring Laura Pausini)	2009	Piano sin fronteras
"Con tutto l'amore che posso" (Claudio Baglioni featuring Laura Pausini & Stefano di Battista)	2009	Q.P.G.A.
"Caruso" (Laura Pausini & Jovanotti — Live)	2009	The Tribute to Pavarotti - One Amazing Weekend in Petra (DVD)
"Il mondo che vorrei" (Live)	2009	The Tribute to Pavarotti - One Amazing Weekend in Petra (DVD)
"Vivere (Dare to Live)" (Andrea Bocelli & Laura Pausini — Live)	2009	The Tribute to Pavarotti - One Amazing Weekend in Petra (DVD)
"Strani amori" (Renato Russo featuring Laura Pausini)	2010	Duetos
"Bienvenido" (Arthur Hanlon featuring Laura Pausini)	2012	Encanto del Caribe: Arthur Hanlon and Friends
"Non insegnate ai bambini" (Giorgio Gaber cover, live)	2012	...Io ci sono
"E ti prometterò" (Josh Groban featuring Laura Pausini)	2013	All That Echoes
"Lo mejor está por llegar" (El Sueño de Morfeo featuring Laura Pausini, Deborah & Ximena Xariñana)	2013	Todos tenemos un sueño
"Sonríe (Smile)" (Gloria Estefan featuring Laura Pausini)	2013	The Standards
"Historia de un amor" (Lucho Gatica featuring Laura Pausini)	2013	Historia de un amor
"Quello che le donne non dicono" (Fiorella Mannoia featuring Laura Pausini)	2014	Fiorella
"Jo sempre hi seré"	2014	El disc de La Marató 2014
"Vivimi" (Biagio Antonacci featuring Laura Pausini — Live)	2014	Palco Antonacci – San Siro 2014 - L'amore comporta
"Quanto tempo e ancora" (Biagio Antonacci featuring Laura Pausini — Live)	2014	Palco Antonacci – San Siro 2014 - L'amore comporta
"Convivendo" (Biagio Antonacci featuring Laura Pausini — Live)	2014	Palco Antonacci – San Siro 2014 - L'amore comporta
"Tra te e il mare" (Biagio Antonacci featuring Laura Pausini & Eros Ramazzotti — Live)	2014	Palco Antonacci – San Siro 2014 - L'amore comporta
"Abrázame muy fuerte" (Juan Gabriel featuring Laura Pausini)	2015	Los Dúo
"Galilea" (Sergio Dalma featuring Laura Pausini)	2019	30 aniversario 1989-2019
"Himno a la Alegría" (with various artists)	2021	Non-album track

== Other charted and certified songs ==
List of non-single tracks entering the charts
Single	Year	Peak chart positions			Certifications	Album
Single	Year	ITA	SWI	US Latin	Certifications	Album
"Come il sole all'improvviso"	2006	— (Note: "Come il sole all'improvviso" was not released as a physical single, and therefore was not allowed to chart on the Italian Singles Chart, which was based on physical sales only until 1 January 2008. However, the song peaked at number 40 on the Italian Top Digital Downloads chart in November 2006.)	—	—		Io canto
"Il mio canto libero" (featuring Juanes)	2006	— (Note: "Il mio canto libero" was not released as a physical single, and therefore was not allowed to chart on the Italian Singles Chart, which was based on physical sales only until 1 January 2008. However, the song peaked at number 25 on the Italian Top Digital Downloads chart in November 2006.)	—	—		Io canto
"Strada facendo"	2006	— (Note: "Strada facendo" was not released as a physical single, and therefore was not allowed to chart on the Italian Singles Chart, which was based on physical sales only until 1 January 2008. However, the song peaked at number 46 on the Italian Top Digital Downloads chart in November 2006.)	—	—		Io canto
"Te amaré" (Miguel Bosé featuring Laura Pausini)	2007	— (Note: "Te amaré" was not released as a physical single, and therefore was not allowed to chart on the Italian Singles Chart, which was based on physical sales only until 1 January 2008. However, the song peaked at number 39 on the Italian Top Digital Downloads chart in June 2007.)	—	—		Papito
"Inedito" (featuring Gianna Nannini)	2011	78	—	—		Inedito
"La fuerza del corazón" (Alejandro Sanz featuring Laura Pausini)	2017	—	—	—	PROMUSICAE: Gold	+Es+ El Concierto en Directo
"Fantastico (Fai quello che sei)"	2018	32	94	—		Fatti sentire
"Un progetto di vita in comune"	2018	57	—	—		Fatti sentire
"Antología"	2026	—	—	— (Note: "Antología" did not chart on the Billboard Hot Latin Songs, but peaked at number 20 on the Latin Pop Airplay Chart.)		Yo canto 2
"—" denotes songs that did not chart or were not released

== Music videos ==
List of music videos, showing year released and director
Title(s)	Year	Director(s)
"La solitudine"	1993	Ambrogio Lo Giudice
"Non c'è"	1993	Unknown
"Perché non torna più"	1993	Unknown
"La soledad"	1994	Ambrogio Lo Giudice
"Se fue"	1994	Unknown
"Strani amori"	1994	Marco Della Fonte
"Gente" (Italian version)	1994	Ago Panini
"Amores extraños"	1995	Stefano Salvati
"Gente" (Spanish version)	1995	Nadia De Paoli
"Incancellabile"; "Inolvidable"; "Inesequecivel"	1996	Jaime De La Peña
"Le cose che vivi"; "Las cosas que vives"	1996	Alberto Colombo
"Ascolta il tuo cuore"; "Escucha a tu corazón"	1997	Alberto Colombo
"Un'emergenza d'amore"; "Emergencia de amor"	1998	Norman Watson
"In assenza di te"; "En ausencia de ti"	1999	Alberto Colombo
"La mia risposta"; "Mi respuesta"	1999	Luca Lucini
"Tra te e il mare"; "Entre tú y mil mares"	2000	Unknown
"Il mio sbaglio più grande"; "Un error de los grandes"	2001	Marco Salom
"Fidati di me"; "Fíate de mí"	2001	Unknown
"Volevo dirti che ti amo"; "Quiero decirte que te amo"	2001	Unknown
"E ritorno da te"; "Volveré junto a ti"	2001	Gabriele Muccino
"Una storia che vale"; "Dos historias iguales"	2002	Daniele Persica
"Sei solo tu"; "Tan solo tu"; (Nek feat. Laura Pausini)	2002	Unknown
"Surrender" (US Version)	2002	Billie Woodruff, Calabazitaz Tiernez
"Surrender" (European Version)	2002	Gaetano Morbioli
"I Need Love"; "De tu amor"	2002	Gaetano Morbioli
"On n'oublie jamais rien, on vit avec" (Hélène Ségara & Laura Pausini)	2003	Gaetano Morbioli
"Resta in ascolto"; "Escucha atento"	2004	Paolo Monico
"Vivimi"; "Víveme"	2004	Gaetano Morbioli
"Come se non fosse stato mai amore"; "Como si no nos hubiéramos amado"	2005	Gaetano Morbioli
"Benedetta passione"; "Bendecida pasión"	2005	Gaetano Morbioli
"La prospettiva di me"	2005	Gaetano Morbioli
"You'll Never Find Another Love Like Mine" (Live) (Michael Bublé feat. Laura Pausini)	2005	David Horn
"Io canto"; "Je chante (Io canto)"; "Yo canto"	2006	Gaetano Morbioli
"Spaccacuore"; "Dispárame, dispara"	2007	Gaetano Morbioli
"Non me lo so spiegare"; "No me lo puedo explicar"; (feat. Tiziano Ferro)	2007	Gaetano Morbioli
"Destinazione paradiso" (Live)	2007	Gaetano Morbioli, Cristian Biondani
"Y mi banda toca el rock" (Live)	2007	Gaetano Morbioli, Cristian Biondani
"Vivere (Dare to Live)"; "Vive ya"; (Andrea Bocelli feat. Laura Pausini)	2007	Beniamino Catena
"Invece no"; "En cambio no"	2008	Alessandro D'Alatri
"Primavera in anticipo (It Is My Song)"; "Primavera anticipada (It Is My Song)"; (feat. James Blunt)	2009	Gaetano Morbioli
"Un fatto ovvio"; "Un hecho obvio"	2009	Gaetano Morbioli
"Domani 21/04.09" (Artisti Uniti per l'Abruzzo - Charity Single)	2009	Ambrogio Lo Giudice
"Con la musica alla radio"; "Con la musica en la radio"	2009	Gaetano Morbioli
"Non sono lei"; "Ella no soy"	2009	Gaetano Morbioli
"Casomai"; "Menos mal"	2010	Gaetano Morbioli
"Gracias a la vida" (Voces Unidas por Chile - Charity Single)	2010	Cristian Calderón
"Donna d'Onna" (Laura Pausini, Gianna Nannini, Giorgia, Elisa & Fiorella Mannoia)	2010	Gaetano Morboli
"Benvenuto"; "Bienvenido"	2011	Gaetano Morboli
"Non ho mai smesso"; "Jamás abandoné"	2011	Gaetano Morboli
"Bastava"; "Bastaba"	2012	Gaetano Morboli
"Mi tengo"	2012	Gaetano Morboli
"Le cose che non mi aspetto"; "Las cosas que no me espero"; (solo or feat. Carlos Baute)	2012	Salvatore Billeci
"Troppo tempo"; "Hace tiempo"	2012	Leandro Manuel Emede, Nicolò Cerioni
"Celeste"	2012	Gaetano Morbioli
"Limpido"; "Limpio"; (solo or feat. Kylie Minogue)	2013	Gaetano Morbioli
"Se non te"	2013	Gaetano Morbioli
"Víveme" (feat. Alejandro Sanz)	2014	Gaetano Morbioli
"Dove resto solo io"	2014	Gaetano Morbioli
"Se fue"(feat. Marc Anthony)	2014	Leandro Manuel Emede, Nicolò Cerioni
"Donde quedo solo yo" (feat. Álex Ubago)	2014	Gaetano Morbioli
"Sino a ti" (feat. Thalía)	2014	Leandro Manuel Emede, Nicolò Cerioni
"Entre tú y mil mares" (feat. Melendi)	2015	Leandro Manuel Emede, Nicolò Cerioni
"Lato destro del cuore"; "Lado derecho del corazón"	2015	Leandro Manuel Emede, Nicolò Cerioni
"Turista"	2025	Paolo Carta
"Desire (Official FIFA Anthem)" (Robbie Williams feat. Laura Pausini)	2025	Paolo Carta
"La mia storia tra le dita"; "Mi historia entre tus dedos"; "Quem de nós dois?"; "Mon histoire entre les doigts"	2025	Geatano Morbioli

== Writing and production credits ==
List of songs written or produced for other artists
Song	Year	Artist	Album	Notes
"Good Morning Happiness" (Written by Laura Pausini, Cheope and Antonio Galbiati)	2000	Neri per Caso	Angelo blu	Writing credits
"La paura non esiste"; "El miedo no existe"; (Written by Tiziano Ferro and Laura Pausini)	2008	Tiziano Ferro	Alla mia età	Writing credits
"Aquí y ahora" (Written by Laura Pausini, Paolo Carta and Kike Jiménez)	2015	Kike Jiménez	Non-album single	Writing and production credits
"Como yo sabría" (Written by Laura Pausini and Virginio Simonelli)	2015	Maverick	18+1	Writing credits
