= List of awards and nominations received by Laura Pausini =

Laura Pausini awards and nominations
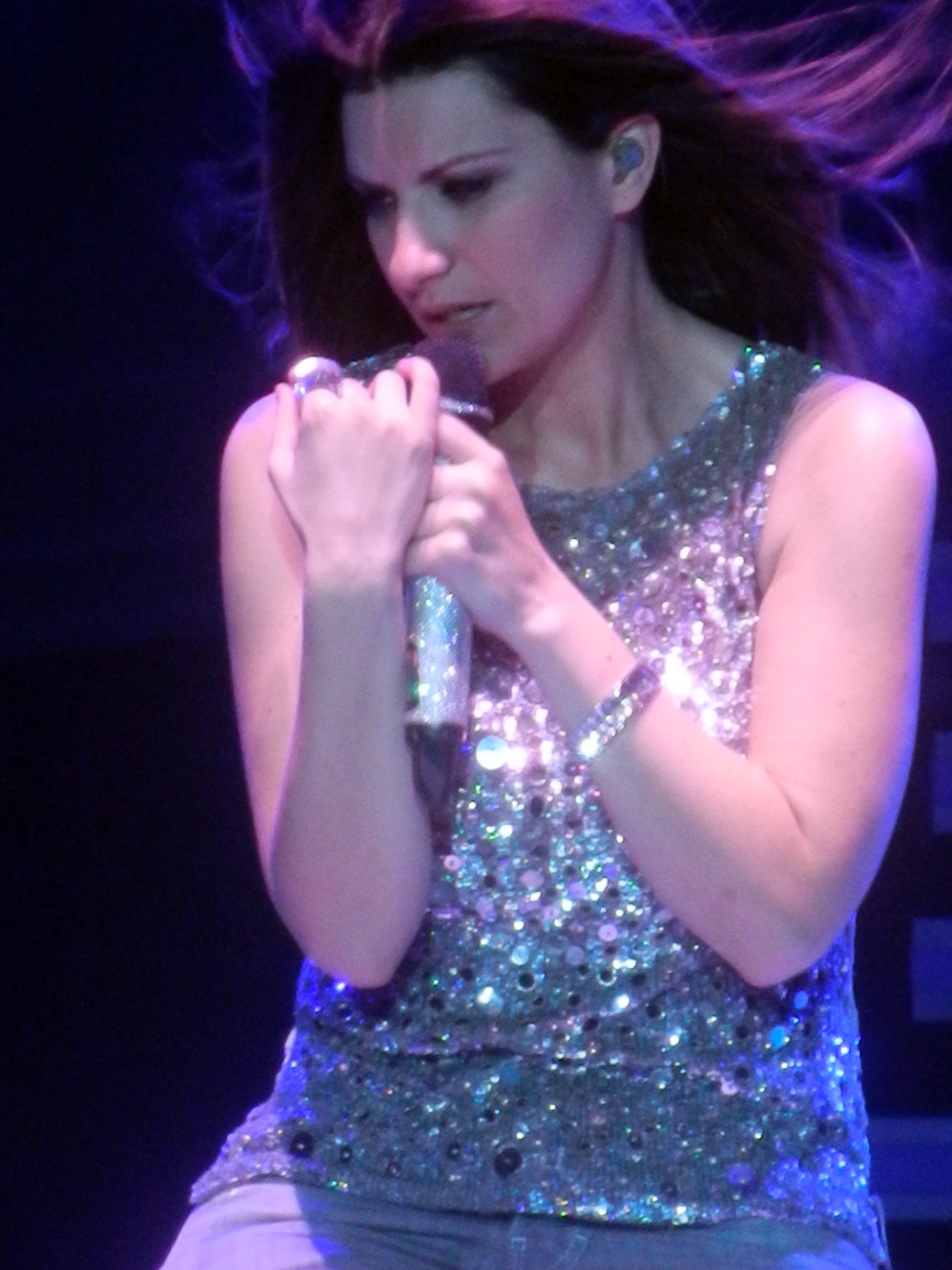
- Pausini performing in 2012
Awards and nominations
Award	Wins	Nominations
Golden Globe	1	1
Grammy	1	2
Academy Awards	0	1
Latin Grammy Awards	5	12
Billboard Latin Music Awards	2	4
Lo Nuestro Awards	4	16
Satellite Awards	1	1
MTV Europe Music Awards	0	1
World Music Awards	6	6
David di Donatello	0	1
IFPI Platinum Europe Awards	4	4
Italian, Wind & Music Awards	8	11
Telegatti	7	8
Sanremo Music Festival	2	2
Festivalbar	3	3
Viña del Mar International Song Festival	4	4
MTV Italian & TRL Awards	1	8
Lunezia Awards	2	2

Totals (Note: Certain award groups do not simply award one winner. They acknowledge several different recipients, have runners-up, and have third place. Since this is a specific recognition and is different from losing an award, runner-up mentions are considered wins in this award tally. For simplification and to avoid errors, each award in this list has been presumed to have had a prior nomination.)
- Wins: 92
- Nominations: 549

Laura Pausini is an Italian pop singer. Throughout her career, she has received multiple music awards in Italy and internationally. She won the Newcomers' section of the Sanremo Music Festival in 1993 and placed third in the Big Artists section in 1994. She was awarded two Lunezia Awards, eight Wind Music Awards, three awards at the Festivalbar, seven Telegatti and an MTV Italian Music Award. Internationally, she has won four awards at the Viña del Mar International Song Festival, four Lo Nuestro Awards, four Latin Grammy Awards, two Billboard Latin Music Award and six World Music Awards. In 2006 she also became the first Italian female artist to win a Grammy Award, receiving the accolade for Best Latin Pop Album for the record Escucha. She has been honoured as a Commander Order of Merit of the Italian Republic by President Carlo Azeglio Ciampi, and as a World Ambassador of Emilia-Romagna.

In 2014, she received the Icon Award from FIMI and Italian Trade, in recognition of her estimated worldwide sales exceeding 70 million units. On 23 October 2025, she was honoured with the 'Icon' award at the Billboard Latin Music Awards for being a global pop icon and the most internationally recognised Italian voice, with 75 million records sold and 6 billion combined streams. On 12 November 2025, she received Billboard Italia's Icon Award at a Vatican ceremony with Pope Leo XIV for her extraordinary accomplishments and historic contributions to the industry and artistry.

== Academy Awards ==
The Academy Awards (the Oscars) are given for artistic and technical merit in the film industry.

Year	Nominee / work	Award	Result	Ref.
2021	"Io sì (Seen)"	Best Original Song	Nominated	

== ALMA Awards ==
The ALMA Awards were established in 1995 by the National Council of La Raza to honor artistic achievement in entertainment obtained by Latin artists. Pausini has received two nominations in 2002.

Year	Nominee / work	Award	Result	Ref.
2002	Laura Pausini	Breakthrough Artist/Group of the Year	Nominated	
2002	Lo mejor de Laura Pausini: Volveré junto a ti	Spanish-Language Album of the Year	Nominated	

== ASCAP Latin Music Awards ==
The ASCAP Latin Music Awards are annually assigned to the songwriters and publishers of ASCAP's most performed songs in Latin Music of the year. Pausini has won 5 awards.

Year	Nominee / work	Award	Result	Ref.
2003	"Volveré junto a ti"	Pop/Ballad Song	Won	
2006	"Víveme"	Top Rated Theme Song for Soap Opera	Won	
2006	"Víveme"	Pop/Ballad Song	Won	
2007	"Como si no nos hubiéramos amado"	Pop/Ballad Song	Won	
2010	"En cambio no"	Pop/Ballad Song	Won	

== Billboard awards and accolades ==
=== Billboard Latin Music Awards ===
Established in 1990, the Billboard Latin Music Awards are the longest-running Latin Music Conference. The awards are annually given by the American music magazine Billboard. Pausini has won two awards from four nominations.

Year	Nominee / work	Award	Result	Ref.
2003	"Surrender"	Latin Dance Club Play Track of the Year	Nominated	
2003	"Surrender"	Latin Dance Maxi-Single of the Year	Nominated	
2006	Escucha	Female Latin Pop Album of the Year	Nominated	
2006	"Víveme"	Female Latin Pop Airplay Song of the Year	Won	
2025	"Herself"	Icon Award	Won	

=== Billboard Italia Women in Music ===
Billboard Italia Women in Music is an annual event by Billboard Italia in 2024. Pausini received one award.

Year	Nominee / work	Award	Result	Ref.
1995	Laura Pausini	Icon Award	Won	

=== Billboard magazine accolades ===
Year	Nominee / work	Award	Result	Ref.
1995	Laura Pausini	Female Revelation Artist of the Year	No. 2	

== Capri Hollywood International Film Festival ==
The Capri Hollywood International Film Festival is an annual international film festival held every late December or early January in Capri, Italy. Pausini has won one award in 2020.

Year	Nominee / work	Award	Result	Ref.
2020	"Io sì (Seen)"	Song of the Year	Won	

== Coca-Cola Summer Festival ==
Year	Nominee / work	Award	Result	Ref.
2014	Laura Pausini	Special FIMI & Italian Trade Icon Award	Won	

== Critics' Choice Awards ==
Critics' Choice Awards
Year	Work	Category	Result
2021	"Io sì (Seen)"	Best Movie Song	Nominated

== David di Donatello Awards ==
The David di Donatello Awards, named after Donatello's David, are film awards given out each year by the Accademia del Cinema Italiano (The Academy of Italian Cinema).

Year	Nominee / work	Award	Result	Ref.
2021	"Io sì (Seen)"	Best Original Song	Nominated	

== Diversity Media Awards ==
The Diversity Media Awards were created in 2016 by Francesca Vecchioni and her foundation, Diversity, to recognize entertainment productions and celebrities supporting LGBT rights in Italy. Pausini has received one award from one nomination.

Year	Nominee / work	Award	Result	Ref.
2016	Laura Pausini	Person of the Year	Won	

== Festivalbar ==
The Festivalbar was an Italian singing itinerant competition, held between 1964 and 2007. Pausini has won three awards in two categories.

Year	Nominee / work	Award	Result	Ref.
1994	Laura Pausini	Europe Award	Won	
1997	Laura Pausini	Europe Award	Won	
2005	Laura Pausini	Best Tour of the Year	Won	

== Giffoni All Music Teen Awards ==
Year	Nominee / work	Award	Result	Ref.
2008	Laura Pausini	Best Singer	Won	

== Giustiniano Awards ==
Year	Nominee / work	Award	Result	Ref.
2014	Laura Pausini	Giustiniano Award for Arts and Culture	Won	

== Globo de Platino ==
Pausini was awarded by the Spanish Institute of Italian Culture with a "Globo de Platino" for contributing in the spread of Italian culture in Spain.

Year	Nominee / work	Award	Result	Ref.
1995	Laura Pausini	Globo de Platino	Nominated	

== Golden Globe Awards ==
Golden Globe Awards
Year	Work	Category	Result
2021	"Io sì (Seen)" (Note: From the film The Life Ahead)	Best Original Song – Motion Picture	Won

== Grammy Awards ==
The Grammy Awards were established in 1958 and are awarded annually by the National Academy of Recording Arts and Sciences of the United States for outstanding achievements in the music industry. Pausini has won one award from two nominations.

Year	Nominee / work	Award	Result	Ref.
2006	Escucha	Best Latin Pop Album	Won	
2017	Similares	Best Latin Pop Album	Nominated	

== Hollywood Music in Media Awards ==
The Hollywood Music in Media Awards (HMMA) is an award organization honoring original music (Song and Score) in all forms visual media. Pausini won one award in 2021.

Year	Nominee / work	Award	Result	Ref.
2021	"Io sì (Seen)"	Outstanding Song – Feature Film	Won	

== IFPI Platinum Europe Awards ==
The Platinum Europe Awards, established in 1996 by the International Federation of the Phonographic Industry, recognize artists that have achieved sales of one million copies of an album in Europe. Pausini has received four Platinum Award.

Year	Nominee / work	Award	Result	Ref.
1996	Laura Pausini	Platinum Award	Won	
1996	Laura	Platinum Award	Won	
1997	Le cose che vivi	Platinum Award	Won	
2002	The Best of Laura Pausini: E ritorno da te	Platinum Award	Won	

== Ischia Music Awards Awards ==
Year	Nominee / work	Award	Result
2007	Laura Pausini	Ischia Music Awards	Won

== Italian Embassy honors ==
Year	Nominee / work	Award	Result
1995	Laura Pausini	Best Selling International Artist in Spain	Won

== Italian Music Awards, Wind Music Awards and Music Awards ==
The Italian Music Awards were an accolade assigned by the Federation of the Italian Music Industry to the best selling Italian and international artists. The first edition was held in February 2001, while the fourth and last edition was held in December 2003. The gap left by the Italian Music Awards was later filled by the Wind Music Awards, established in 2007 as non-competitive awards, based on sales certified by FIMI. In 2014, they were renamed as Music Awards. Totally, Pausini has won 8 awards from 11 nominations.

Year	Nominee / work	Award	Result
2001	Laura Pausini	Best Italian Female Artist	Nominated
2002	Laura Pausini	Best Italian Female Artist	Nominated
2003	Laura Pausini	Best Italian Female Artist	Nominated
2007	Io canto	Album Award	Won
2008	San Siro 2007	Album Award	Won
2008	San Siro 2007 (DVD)	DVD Award	Won
2009	Primavera in anticipo	Album Award	Won
2010	Laura Live World Tour 09	Multi-platinum Award	Won
2012	Inedito	Multi-platinum Award	Won
2014	Stasera Laura: Ho creduto in un sogno	Best Music TV Programme	Won
2014	20 – The Greatest Hits	Multi-platinum Award	Won

== Latin Grammy Awards ==
The Latin Grammy Awards are accolades annually awarded by the Latin Academy of Recording Arts & Sciences to products recorded either in Spanish or Portuguese. Pausini has won five awards from twelve nominations.

Year	Nominee / work	Award	Result
2001	Entre tú y mil mares	Best Female Pop Vocal Album	Nominated
2001	Laura Pausini and Alfredo Cerruti	Producer of the Year	Nominated
2005	Escucha	Best Female Pop Vocal Album	Won
2007	Yo canto	Best Female Pop Vocal Album	Won
2008	"Vive ya (Dare to Live)" (Andrea Bocelli & Laura Pausini)	Record of the Year	Nominated
2009	"En cambio no"	Record of the Year	Nominated
2009	Primavera anticipada	Best Female Pop Vocal Album	Won
2010	Laura Live Gira Mundial 09	Best Long Form Music Video	Nominated
2016	"Lado Derecho del Corazón"	Record of the Year	Nominated
2018	Hazte sentir	Best Traditional Pop Vocal Album	Won
2024	Almas paralelas	Best Traditional Pop Vocal Album	Nominated
2026	Yo canto 2	Best Traditional Pop Vocal Album	Won

Latin Grammy Special Awards

Year	Nominee / work	Award	Result
2023	Herself	Latin Recording Academy Person of the Year	Won

== Legend Music Awards ==
The Legend Music Awards are prizes recognizing artists committed with social and humanitarian issues. Pausini received the award in 2010.

Year	Nominee / work	Award	Result
2010	Laura Pausini	Legend Music Award	Won

== Leggio d'Oro ==
Year	Nominee / work	Award	Result
2010	Amiche per l'Abruzzo	Social Contribution Award (with Fiorella Mannoia, Elisa, Giorgia and Gianna Nannini)	Won

== LOS 40 Music Awards ==
LOS40 Music Awards (formerly titled 'Premios 40 Principales') is an awards ceremony hosted annually by the Spanish radio channel Los 40 Principales. Laura Pausini has won one award.

Year	Nominee work	Award	Result
2019	Laura Pausini	Golden Career Award	Won

== Lo Nuestro Awards ==
Lo Nuestro is an award presented by television network Univision, which honors the best in Latin music and music video. Nominations are determined by Record companies and Latin radio station program directors. During her career, Pausini has won four awards from nineteen nominations.

Year	Nominee / work	Award	Result
1995	Laura Pausini	Pop Revelation of the Year	Won
1997	Laura Pausini	Pop Female Artist	Nominated
1997	"Las cosas que vives"	Video of the Year	Nominated
2002	Laura Pausini	Pop Female Artist	Nominated
2003	Laura Pausini	Pop Female Artist	Nominated
2006	Laura Pausini	Pop Female Artist	Won
2006	Escucha	Pop Album of the Year	Nominated
2006	"Víveme"	Pop Song of the Year	Nominated
2006	"Víveme"	Video of the Year	Nominated
2007	Laura Pausini	Pop Female Artist	Nominated
2010	Laura Pausini	Pop Female Artist	Won
2012	"Bienvenido"	Video of the Year	Nominated
2013	"Jamás abandoné"	Video of the Year	Nominated
2015	Laura Pausini	Premio a la Trayectoria Musical	Won
2015	Laura Pausini	Pop Female Artist of the Year	Nominated
2015	20 – Grandes Éxitos	Pop Album of the Year	Nominated
2015	"Se fue"	Tropical Collaboration of the Year (with Marc Anthony)	Nominated
2019	"Amores Extraños"	Replay Song of the Year	Nominated
2025	Herself	Pop Female Artist of the Year	Nominated
2025	"Roma" (with Luis Fonsi)	Pop/Ballad Song of the Year	Nominated

== Lunezia Awards ==
The Lunezia Awards were created in 1996 and they annually honor the best lyrics of Italian songs for their musical-literary value. Pausini has received two awards.

Year	Nominee / work	Award	Result
2001	"Viaggio con te"	Female Songwriter of the Year	Won
2007	Laura Pausini	Lunezia in the World	Won

== Medimex Awards ==
Year	Nominee / work	Award	Result
2015	Laura Pausini	Best Italian Artist in the World	Won

== MTV Italy Awards and TRL Awards ==
The MTV Awards are accolades introduced in 2013 by MTV Italy following the TRL Awards. Prizes are awarded in several categories, based on public's televotes. Pausini received eight nominations and has won one award.

Year	Nominee / work	Award	Result
2006	Laura Pausini	Italians Do It Better	Nominated
2007	Laura Pausini	First Lady	Nominated
2007	Laura Pausini	Italians Do It Better	Nominated
2009	Laura Pausini	First Lady	Nominated
2012	Laura Pausini	Wonder Woman Award	Won
2014	Laura Pausini	Wonder Woman	Nominated
2014	Laura Pausini	TwITStar	Nominated
2014	Laura Pausini	Artist Saga	Nominated

== MTV Europe Music Awards ==
The MTV Europe Music Awards were established in 1994 by MTV Networks Europe to celebrate the most popular music videos in Europe. Pausini has been nominated one time.

Year	Nominee / work	Award	Result
2005	Laura Pausini	Best Italian Act	Nominated

== Nickelodeon Kids' Choice Awards, Italy ==
Year	Nominee / work	Award	Result
2006	Laura Pausini	Best Italian Singer	Nominated
2007	Laura Pausini	Best Italian Singer	Won
2008	Laura Pausini	Best Female Singer	Nominated

== NRJ Music Awards ==
The NRJ Music Awards, created in 2000 by the radio station NRJ and the television network TF1, give out awards to popular musicians by different categories. Pausini has received four nominations.

Year	Nominee / work	Award	Result
2003	The Best of Laura Pausini: E ritorno da te	International Album of the Year	Nominated
2003	"E ritorno da te"	International Song of the Year	Nominated
2003	Laura Pausini	International Female Artist of the Year	Nominated
2004	Laura Pausini	International Female Artist of the Year	Nominated

== OGAE Song Contest ==
The OGAE Song Contest is an audio event in which all OGAE national clubs can enter with an original song released in the previous 12 months in their countries, and sung in one of the country's official languages. Pausini has received one award out of one nomination.

Year	Nominee / work	Award	Result
1993	"La solitudine"	Winner of OGAE Song Contest	Won

== OGAE Video Contest ==
The OGAE Video Contest is a video event in which different branches of OGAE, can enter with an original song and video released in the previous 12 months in their countries, without any restriction on the song's language. Pausini has received one nomination.

Year	Nominee / work	Award	Result
2005	"Come se non fosse stato mai amore"	Winner of OGAE Video Contest	Nominated

== Onstage Awards ==
Year	Nominee / work	Award	Result
2012	Inedito World Tour 2011–2012	Best Tour	Nominated

== Order of Merit of the Italian Republic ==
Year	Nominee / work	Award	Result
2006	Laura Pausini	Appointed Commander Order of Merit of the Italian Republic	Won

== Orgullosamente Latino Awards ==
Year	Nominee / work	Award	Result
2005	Laura Pausini	Female Latin Artist of the Year	Won
2007	Laura Pausini	Female Latin Artist of the Year	Nominated
2007	Io canto	Latin Album of the Year	Nominated
2007	Disparame, dispara	Latin Song of the Year	Nominated
2007	Disparame, dispara	Latin Video of the Year	Nominated
2008	Laura Pausini	Female Latin Artist of the Year	Nominated
2009	Laura Pausini	Best Latin Career	Nominated
2009	Laura Pausini	Female Latin Artist of the Year	Nominated
2010	Laura Pausini	Female Latin Artist of the Year	Nominated
2010	aura Live Gira Mundial 09	Latin Album of the Year	Nominated
2010	Con la musica en la radio	Latin Song of the Year	Nominated
2010	Con la musica en la radio	Latin Video of the Year	Nominated

== Paseo de las Estrellas de Tijuana ==
Year	Nominee / work	Award	Result
2014	Laura Pausini	Inducted into Tijuana's El Paseo de las Estrellas	Won

== Prêmio Contigo! ==
Year	Nominee / work	Award	Result
2003	"Esperança"	Best Opening Theme for a Telenovela	Won

== Premio Italiano della Musica ==
The Premio Italiano della Musica (English: Italian Award for Music) was an accolade established in 1996 by la Repubblica's music supplement Musica! Rock e altro in association with Italian radio station Radio DeeJay, annually broadcast by Italia 1 until 2002, when the last ceremony was held. Pausini has received three nominations.

Year	Nominee / work	Award	Result
2001	Laura Pausini	Best Female Artist	Nominated
2001	Tra te e il mare	Album of the Year	Nominated
2002	Laura Pausini	Best Female Artist	Nominated

== Premios de la Gente ==
The Premios de la Gente, also known as Ritmo Latino Music Awards, were created in 1999 to award Latin music based on fans votes. Pausini has received one award from four nominations.

Year	Nominee / work	Award	Result
2002	Lo mejor de Laura Pausini	Female Pop Artist or Group of the Year	Nominated
2002	"Volveré junto a ti"	Composer of the Year – Male or Female	Nominated
2002	Laura Pausini	Artist of the Year – Male or Female	Nominated
2005	Laura Pausini	Female Pop Artist or Group of the Year	Won

== Premio Regia Televisiva ==
The Premio Regia Televisiva is an annual prize ceremony, awarded to the best Italian television productions and personalities. Pausini received two nominations in 2016.

Year	Nominee / work	Award	Result
2016	Laura & Paola	Best TV Programme	Nominated
2016	Laura Pausini	Revelation of the Year	Won

== Premios Dial ==
Year	Nominee / work	Award	Result
2006	Laura Pausini	Premio Dial	Won
2011	Laura Pausini	Premio Dial	Won
2015	Laura Pausini	Premio Dial	Won
2016	Laura Pausini	Premio Dial	Won
2019	Laura Pausini	Premio Dial	Won

== Premios Gardel a la Música ==
Year	Nominee / work	Award	Result
2002	Laura Pausini	Best Female Artist	Nominated
2002	Lo mejor de Laura Pausini: Volveré junto a ti	Album of the Year	Nominated

== Premios Juventud ==
Premios Juventud are awards for Spanish-speaking celebrities in the areas of film, music, sports, fashion, and pop culture, presented by the television network Univision. Winners are determined by online vote at Univision's website. Pausini has received seven nominations.

Year	Nominee / work	Award	Result
2005	Laura Pausini	Voz del Momento – Femenina / I Hear Her Everywhere	Nominated
2005	"Víveme"	Canción corta-venas / Best Ballad	Nominated
2007	Dispàrame, dispara	Best video	Nominated
2012	Laura Pausini	This moment voice	Nominated
2012	Laura Pausini	Best pop artist	Nominated
2012	Bienvenido	Best video	Nominated
2012	Jamás abandoné	Best song	Nominated

== Premios Número 1 de CADENA 100 ==
Year	Nominee / work	Award	Result
2014	Laura Pausini	Los Premios Números 1	Won

== Premios Oye! ==
Premios Oye! are presented annually by the Academia Nacional de la Música en México since 2002 for outstanding achievements in Mexican record industry. Pausini has received three nominations.

Year	Nominee / work	Award	Result
2007	Laura Pausini	Best Female Artist	Nominated
2009	Laura Pausini	Best Female Artist	Nominated
2009	"En cambio no"	Spanish-Language Theme from a Telenovela, Movie or T.V. Series	Nominated

== Rockol Awards ==
Year	Nominee / work	Award	Result
2011	Inedito	Best Italian Album	Nominated
2011	"Benvenuto"	Best Italian Music Video	Nominated
2011	"Benvenuto"	Best Italian Single	Nominated
2012	Inedito World Tour	Best Concert or Festival of the Year	Nominated
2013	"Limpido"	Best Italian Single	Nominated
2013	"Limpido"	Best Italian Video	Nominated
2018	Fatti sentire	Best Album By an Italian Artist or Band – Public Vote	Nominated
2024	Laura Pausini World Tour 2023-2024	Best Live Tour By an Italian Artist	Won

== Sanremo League ==
The Sanremo League Award is a competition, launched in 2015 by the organizers of the Sanremo Music Festival, to vote the best song of the Festival della Canzone Italiana. Pausini placed first in the competition with her 1993 entry, "La solitudine".

Year	Nominee / work	Award	Result
2015	"La solitudine"	Best Sanremo Music Festival song	Won

== Sanremo Music Festival ==
Pausini has competed two times at Sanremo Music Festival (Festival della Canzone Italiana), the most popular Italian music contest. She has won two prizes from two performances.

Year	Nominee / work	Award	Result
1993	"La solitudine"	Newcomers' Section	First place
1994	"Strani amori"	Big Artists Section	Third place

== Sanremo Top ==
Sanremo Top was a televised award honoring the best-selling songs of the Sanremo Music Festival. The ceremony was launched in 1994, when Pausini received the first prize for the song "Strani amori", which was the best-selling song among the ones competing in the Big Artists section.

Year	Nominee / work	Award	Result
1994	Laura Pausini	Sanremo Top Award	First place

== Satellite Awards ==
Year	Nominee / work	Award	Result
2021	"Io sì (Seen)"	Best Original Song – Film	Won

== Solarolo honorary citizenship ==
Solarolo is a comune in the province of Ravenna, Emilia-Romagna, Italy, in which Pausini spent her childhood. On 9 June 2006, the municipality conferred the honorary citizenship to Pausini.

Year	Nominee / work	Award	Result
2006	Laura Pausini	City Key as an honorary citizen of Comune di Solarolo	Won

== Telegatto Awards ==
The Telegatto was a prize sponsored by the Italian weekly listings magazine TV Sorrisi e Canzoni and determined by the magazine's readers. Pausini has won 7 awards from 8 nominations.

Year	Nominee / work	Award	Result
1993	Laura Pausini	Best New Artist	Won
1994	Laura Pausini	Best Female Artist	Won
2007	Laura Pausini	Best Singer	Won
2007	Laura Pausini	Platinum Award for Excellence in Music	Won
2007	Live in Paris 05	Album of the Year	Nominated
2008	Io canto	Album of the Year	Won
2008	Laura Pausini	Best Singer	Won
2008	San Siro 2007	Best Tour	Won

== Tijuana honorary citizenship ==
Tijuana, Baja California, is a Mexican city. In 2014, Pausini received the City Key as an honorary citizen of the city.

Year	Nominee / work	Award	Result
2014	Laura Pausini	City Key as an honorary citizen of City of Tijuana	Won

== Viña del Mar International Song Festival ==
Year	Nominee / work	Award	Result
2014	Laura Pausini	Silver Torch	Won
2014	Laura Pausini	Golden Torch	Won
2014	Laura Pausini	Silver Seagull	Won
2014	Laura Pausini	Golden Seagull	Won

== Walk of Fame Europe ==
The Walk of Fame Europe is a boulevard in Rotterdam, the Netherlands, which features 60 stars of celebrities. The original stars collection was launched in 1989. A selection of the stars was later moved to the new walk of fame, inaugurated in 2014.

Year	Nominee / work	Award	Result
—N/a	Laura Pausini	Inducted into the Walk of Fame Europe	Won

== World Ambassador of Emilia-Romagna ==
Year	Nominee / work	Award	Result
2013	Laura Pausini	Appointed World Ambassador of Emilia-Romagna region	Won

== World Music Awards ==
World Music Awards are annually assigned by the International Federation of the Phonographic Industry and are determined by worldwide albums sales. During her career, Pausini has won six awards.

Year	Nominee / work	Award	Result
1995	Laura Pausini	Best Selling Italian Recording Artist	Won
2003	Laura Pausini	Best Selling Italian Pop/Rock Female Artist	Won
2007	Laura Pausini	Best Selling Italian Artist	Won
2010	Laura Pausini	Best Female Selling Italian Artist	Won
2014	Laura Pausini	Career Award	Won
