= Daniel Vuletic =

Italian composer and producer (born 1970)

Danijel Vuletic
- Born: Danijel Vuletić; July 5, 1970 (age 55); Zagreb, SR Croatia, SFR Yugoslavia
- Origin: Milan, Italy
- Occupations: Composer, producer

Danijel Vuletić (best known as Daniel Vuletic, born July 5, 1970) is an Italian composer and producer. Five times Grammy Award winner with songs written for Laura Pausini, and Songwriter for Andrea Bocelli, Luciano Pavarotti, Zucchero, Nek, Mina, Adriano Celentano, Malika Ayane, Gianni Morandi, Enrico Nigiotti, James Blunt, Juanes, Gianna Nannini.

== Biography ==
Vuletic was born in Zagreb (Croatia) and has lived and worked in Milan, Italy since 1993. Vuletic has produced and written for numerous Italian, Spanish and English speaking performers including Laura Pausini, Andrea Bocelli, Luis Fonsi, Nicky Jam, Wisin, Nek, Luciano Pavarotti, Adriano Celentano, Mina, Zucchero, James Blunt, Juanes, Gianna Nannini, Gianni Morandi, Malika Ayane, Marco Carta just to name a few.

In 1993, Vuletic, seeking his childhood idol, world-renowned producer Celso Valli, left Croatia for Italy. Valli had produced Eros Ramazzotti and Andrea Bocelli and a long list of other talented artists. After years of living in Milan and playing in European clubs his dream of meeting Valli is realized. Valli heard five of his songs; so impressed by the songs Valli decides to produce Vuletic on the spot.

== Career and awards ==
- 2005 Grammy Award: Album "Escucha" Laura Pausini
- 2005 Latin Grammy Award: Album "Escucha" Laura Pausini
- 2007 Latin Grammy Award: Album "Yo Canto" Laura Pausini
- 2009 Latin Grammy Award: Album "Primavera Anticipada" Laura Pausini
- 2003, 2006, 2006, 2007, 2010 Latin ASCAP Award
- 2006, 2010, 2015 Lo Nuestro Award
- 2003, 2007, 2010 World Music Awards
- 2018 Latin Grammy Award for the best Pop Traditional Album "Hazte Sentir" Laura Pausini
- 2018 November 10 1 on Billboard 200 "Sì" Andrea Bocelli

In 1998, Vuletic signed a contract with Sony Italy as a singer, and Valli recorded the album between Italy and Los Angeles. The first single was "Imparando (A Stare Senza Te)", starring Martina Stella, one of the most popular Italian actresses at the time.

On stage at his first concert in Riccione Italy, Vuletic decided to write songs rather than perform them and immediately shares this self-revelation with Valli; together they scrapped the album opting instead to release 3 singles. Laura Pausini having heard his single on the radio met Vuletic and the pair began their collaboration and in 2000 they worked on their first album together, "Entre Tu y Mil Mares".

A year later, Vuletic wrote "Volveré Junto a Ti" and "Dos Historias Iguales" the top 2 singles in the album "The Best of Laura Pausini" which reached 7,000,000 copies in sales. "Volveré Junto a Ti" gave Vuletic his first ASCAP award.

In 2002, his collaboration with Nek started with the album "Las cosas que Defendere" writing the single "Hablamos en Pasado" among others.

The album "Escucha" was released in 2004 and was a hit, winning in 2005 the Grammy Award as the "Best Latin Pop Album" and Latin Grammy for "Best Female Pop Vocal album". Vuletic wrote "Escucha Atento", "Como si No Nos Hubieramos Amado", "Mi perspectiva", "Tu Nombre en Mayusculas", "Hablame" in this album. "Como si No Nos Hubieramos Amado" gave him the second ASCAP award.

"Yo Canto" was released in 2006 and Vuletic arranged and produced 3 songs in that album: "Destino Paraiso", "Disparame Dispara", and "Mi Libre Cancion" (Duet with Juanes). "Yo Canto" won the Latin Grammy for "Best Female Pop Vocal Album".

In 2008, the album "Primavera Anticipada", Vuletic wrote "Primavera Anticipada" (Duet with James Blunt), "Del Modo Mas Sincero", "Un Hecho Obvio", "Mis Beneficios", "Mas que Ayer", "La Impresion", "Hermana Tierra". In 2009, "Primavera Anticipada" won the Latin Grammy for "Best Female Pop Vocal Album".

In the "Laura Live World Tour" in 2009 it toured with 3 singles written by Vuletic: "Con la Musica en la Radio", "Menos Mal" and "Ella no Soy".

In 2009 Vuletic signed with Sugar Publishing.

In 2011 the album "Inedito", Vuletic wrote, arranged and produced the songs: "Inedito" (Duet with Gianna Nannini), "Cada uno juega su partida", "Te digo adios" and "Como vives tu sin mi".

In November 2015 in New York City, Vuletic became the first Italian composer to sign a contract with a US publisher, Sony/ATV Music Publishing.

In 2018 Vuletic wrote "Ave Maria pietas" for Andrea Bocelli's new album Sì. There is a duet version of "Ave Maria pietas" with the famous russian soprano Aida Garifullina.

In 2019 "Ave Maria pietas" will be the Soundtrack of "Fatima", USA movie directed by Marco Pontecorvo, starring Harvey Keitel

== Selected discography ==
=== Albums ===
- 2000 - Entre Tu y Mil Mares - Laura Pausini
- 2001 - The Best of Laura Pausini: Volveré Junto a Ti - Laura Pausini
- 2002 - Las Cosas que Defenderè - Nek
- 2002 - L'Amore ci Cambia La Vita - Gianni Morandi
- 2003 - Ti Adoro - Luciano Pavarotti
- 2004 - Escucha - Laura Pausini
- 2005 - C'è Sempre un Motivo - Adriano Celentano
- 2005 - Bula Bula - Mina
- 2005 - Live in Paris - Laura Pausini
- 2006 - Yo Canto - Laura Pausini
- 2007 - Dormi Amore, la Situazione non è Buona - Adriano Celentano
- 2007 . San Siro 2007 - Laura Pausini
- 2008 - Primavera Anticipada - Laura Pausini
- 2008 - All the Lost Souls - DeLuxe Edition - James Blunt
- 2009 - Laura Live World Tour 09 - Laura Pausini
- 2009 - La Forza Mia - Marco Carta
- 2010 - Libera Nel Mondo - Enrico Nigiotti
- 2011 - Inedito - Laura Pausini
- 2012 . Ricreazione - Malika Ayane
- 2013 - 20 - The Greatest Hits - Laura Pausini
- 2015 - Simili - Laura Pausini
- 2018 - Fatti sentire - Laura Pausini
- 2018 - Sì - Andrea Bocelli
- 2019 - D.O.C. - Zucchero
- 2023 - ‘’Anime parallele’’ - Laura Pausini
