= La prospettiva di me =

Single by Laura Pausini

from the album Resta in ascolto
- Released: 4 November 2005
- Recorded: 2003
- Genre: Pop
- Length: 3:05
- Composer: Daniel Vuletic
- Lyricists: Laura Pausini & Cheope

Music video
- "La prospettiva di me" on YouTube

La prospettiva di me (literally My perspective in English) is a song recorded by Italian singer Laura Pausini, for her seventh studio album, Resta in ascolto.

The song was written by Pausini and Cheope, with the music being composed by Daniel Vuletic. A Spanish-language version, titled "Mi perspectiva" was recorded and included on the Spanish version of "Resta in ascolto", "Escucha". It was adapted by Laura Pausini and Badia.

Being a part of the 2004 album Resta in ascolto, the song was chosen and published as the first single promoting the live album Live in Paris 05.

Both versions of the song were performed during Pausini's fourth and fifth concert tours, along with a version present in the DVD San Siro 2007.

== Videoclip ==
The music video of the song was directed by Gaetano Morbioli and broadcast for the first time on 21 November 2005. It shows images of the two gigs performed in Paris on 22 and 23 March, alternating with images of the singer herself in many locations.

In 2006, this music video was inserted in the CD-Rom of the Greek edition of the album Io canto

== Usage ==
Live versions of La prospettiva di me were inserted in the albums Live in Paris 05 (audio and video), San Siro 2007 and Laura Live World Tour 09 and Laura Live Gira Mundial 09 del 2009 (Medley Rock video).

A live version Mi perspectiva was inserted in the album Laura Live Gira Mundial 09.

== Tracks ==
- CDS – Promo 15623 Warner Music Europe
  1. La prospettiva di me (Studio Version)
  2. La prospettiva di me (Live Version at Zenith Paris in March 2005)
- Digital download
  1. La prospettiva di me
  2. Mi perspectiva
