= List of number-one hits of 2004 (Italy) =

This is a list of the number-one hits of 2004 on FIMI's Italian Singles and Albums Charts.

Week	Issue date	Song	Artist	Album	Artist
1	2 January	"Obsesión"	Aventura	Giro d'Italia	Ligabue
2	9 January	"Obsesión"	Aventura	Giro d'Italia	Ligabue
3	16 January	"Shut Up"	The Black Eyed Peas	111 Centoundici	Tiziano Ferro
4	23 January	"Dragostea din tei"	Haiducii	Concerti	Fiorella Mannoia
5	30 January	"Dragostea din tei"	Haiducii	111 Centoundici	Tiziano Ferro
6	6 February	"Dragostea din tei"	Haiducii	Feels Like Home	Norah Jones
7	13 February	"Dragostea din tei"	Haiducii	Feels Like Home	Norah Jones
8	20 February	"Dragostea din tei"	Haiducii	Ritratti	Francesco Guccini
9	27 February	"Amazing"	George Michael	Ritratti	Francesco Guccini
10	5 March	"Dragostea din tei"	Haiducii	The Platinum Collection	Mina
11	12 March	"Left Outside Alone"	Anastacia	Patience	George Michael
12	19 March	"Left Outside Alone"	Anastacia	'Convivendo parte 1	Biagio Antonacci
13	26 March	"Left Outside Alone"	Anastacia	'Convivendo parte 1	Biagio Antonacci
14	2 April	"Left Outside Alone"	Anastacia	Buoni o cattivi	Vasco Rossi
15	9 April	"Left Outside Alone"	Anastacia	Buoni o cattivi	Vasco Rossi
16	16 April	"Left Outside Alone"	Anastacia	Buoni o cattivi	Vasco Rossi
17	23 April	"A chi mi dice"	Blue	Passi d'autore	Pino Daniele
18	30 April	"A chi mi dice"	Blue	Buoni o cattivi	Vasco Rossi
19	7 May	"A chi mi dice"	Blue	Passi d'autore	Pino Daniele
20	14 May	"A chi mi dice"	Blue	Zu & Co.	Zucchero
21	21 May	"A chi mi dice"	Blue	Ascolta	Pooh
22	28 May	"A chi mi dice"	Blue	Il mondo insieme a te	Max Pezzali
23	4 June	"A chi mi dice"	Blue	Zu & Co.	Zucchero
24	11 June	"A chi mi dice"	Blue	Zu & Co.	Zucchero
25	18 June	"Fuck It (I Don't Want You Back)"	Eamon	Buoni o cattivi	Vasco Rossi
26	25 June	"Fuck It (I Don't Want You Back)"	Eamon	Buoni o cattivi	Vasco Rossi
27	2 July	"Fuck It (I Don't Want You Back)"	Eamon	Buoni o cattivi	Vasco Rossi
28	9 July	"Fuck It (I Don't Want You Back)"	Eamon	Buoni o cattivi	Vasco Rossi
29	16 July	"Fuck It (I Don't Want You Back)"	Eamon	Buoni o cattivi	Vasco Rossi
30	23 July	"Fuck It (I Don't Want You Back)"	Eamon	Buoni o cattivi	Vasco Rossi
31	30 July	"Fuck It (I Don't Want You Back)"	Eamon	Buoni o cattivi	Vasco Rossi
32	6 August	"Fuck It (I Don't Want You Back)"	Eamon	Buoni o cattivi	Vasco Rossi
33	13 August	"Fuck It (I Don't Want You Back)"	Eamon	Buoni o cattivi	Vasco Rossi
34	20 August	"Fuck It (I Don't Want You Back)"	Eamon	Buoni o cattivi	Vasco Rossi
35	27 August	"Fuck It (I Don't Want You Back)"	Eamon	Buoni o cattivi	Vasco Rossi
36	3 September	"Universal Prayer"	Tiziano Ferro and Jamelia	Genius Loves Company	Ray Charles
37	10 September	"The Reason"	Hoobastank	Genius Loves Company	Ray Charles
38	17 September	"The Reason"	Hoobastank	There Will Be a Light	Ben Harper and The Blind Boys of Alabama
39	24 September	"Calma e sangue freddo"	Luca Dirisio	Genius Loves Company	Ray Charles
40	1 October	"Resta in ascolto"	Laura Pausini	Dieci stratagemmi	Franco Battiato
41	8 October	"Resta in ascolto"	Laura Pausini	Around the Sun	R.E.M.
42	15 October	"Resta in ascolto"	Laura Pausini	Greatest Hits	Robbie Williams
43	22 October	"Resta in ascolto"	Laura Pausini	Resta in ascolto	Laura Pausini
44	29 October	"My Prerogative"	Britney Spears	Greatest Hits	Robbie Williams
45	5 November	"Vertigo"	U2	Elegia	Paolo Conte
46	12 November	"Vertigo"	U2	Best of Blue	Blue
47	19 November	"Vertigo"	U2	How to Dismantle an Atomic Bomb	U2
48	26 November	"Vertigo"	U2	How to Dismantle an Atomic Bomb	U2
49	3 December	"Do They Know It's Christmas?"	Band Aid 20	Best of Blue	Blue
50	10 December	"Do They Know It's Christmas?"	Band Aid 20	Best of Blue	Blue
51	17 December	"Do They Know It's Christmas?"	Band Aid 20	Best of Blue	Blue
52	24 December	"Do They Know It's Christmas?"	Band Aid 20	Best of Blue	Blue
53	31 December	"Do They Know It's Christmas?"	Band Aid 20	Best of Blue	Blue

== See also ==
- 2004 in music
- List of number-one hits in Italy
