= Destinazione paradiso =

Studio album by Gianluca Grignani
- Released: 24 February 1995
- Studio: Digital Studio l'Isola, Milan, Italy
- Genre: Rock, pop
- Length: 46:34
- Label: PolyGram, Mercury
- Producer: Massimo Luca, Vince Tempera

Gianluca Grignani chronology
Destinazione paradiso (1995)	La fabbrica di plastica (1996)

Destinazione paradiso is the first studio album by Italian singer-songwriter Gianluca Grignani. The album, produced by Massimo Luca and Vince Tempera, has sold about 650,000 copies in Italy during 1995, and it has later passed 700,000 copies domestically and about 1,000,000 copies abroad, mainly in South America, where a Spanish-language version of the record was released under the title Destino paraíso.

Thanks to the success achieved by the album, Grignani was awarded with a Telegatto for Revelation of the Year in 1995.

== Background ==
The album is mainly composed of melodic ballads focusing on young generations' uneases. It also contains the singles "La mia storia tra le dita", a pop ballad performed for the first time by Grignani during the televised selection for the 1995 Sanremo Music Festival, and "Destinazione paradiso", his entry for that year's contest, which finished sixth in the newcomers' competition. Another track, "Le-ro-là", was initially composed for the album, but it was not released until 2010, when it was included in Grignani's eighth studio album, Romantico Rock Show.

== Track listing ==
=== Italian-language edition ===
Destinazione paradiso
No.	Title	Writer(s)	Length
1.	"La mia storia tra le dita"	Grignani	5:10
2.	"Falco a metà"	Grignani	4:43
3.	"Una donna così"	Grignani	4:22
4.	"Cammina bambina"	Grignani	4:04
5.	"Primo treno per Marte"	Grignani	5:11
6.	"Destinazione paradiso"	Grignani	3:48
7.	"Ci vuoi tornare con me"	Grignani	3:52
8.	"Tanto tempo fa"	Grignani	3:57
9.	"Come fai?"	Grignani	4:47
10.	"Ae-au"	Grignani	3:08
11.	"Il gioco di Sandy"	Grignani	3:39

=== Spanish-language edition ===
Destino paraíso
No.	Title	Writer(s)	Length
1.	"Mi historia entre tus dedos"	Grignani	5:10
2.	"Halcón a medias"	Grignani	4:43
3.	"Una chica normal"	Grignani	4:22
4.	"Camina chiquilla"	Grignani	4:04
5.	"Primer tren a Marte"	Grignani	5:11
6.	"Destino paraíso"	Grignani	3:48
7.	"Si quieres puedes volver"	Grignani	3:52
8.	"Tanto tiempo atras"	Grignani	3:57
9.	"¿Qué haces tú?"	Grignani	4:47
10.	"Ae-au"	Grignani	3:08
11.	"El juego de Sandy"	Grignani	3:39
12.	"La mia storia tra le dita"	Grignani	5:14

== Personnel ==
Music credits

- Gigi Cappellotto – bass
- Margherita Graczyk – orchestra conductor
- Gianluca Grignani – vocals, composer
- Massimo Luca – guitars, arrangements
- Lele Melotti – drums
- Pier Carlo Penta – Hammond organ, keyboards, programming
- Vince Tempera – keyboards, arrangements

Production credits

- Vince Tempera – producer
- Massimo Luca – record producer
- Umberto Iervolino – pre-producer
- Bruno Malasoma – engineer, mixing
- Antonio Baglio – editing
- Pier Carlo Penta – engineer

== Charts ==
Chart (1995)	Peak position
Italian Albums Chart	2
Swiss Albums Chart	27
