= Il tuo nome in maiuscolo =

Single by Laura Pausini

from the album Live in Paris 05
- Released: 2004
- Genre: Pop
- Length: 3:20
- Songwriters: Laura Pausini and Cheope

Laura Pausini singles chronology
"Benedetta passione" (2004)	"Il tuo nome in maiuscolo" (2004)	"Uguale a lei (She)" (2006)

Il tuo nome in maiuscolo (Your name in capital letters in English) is a song recorded by Italian singer Laura Pausini, for her eighth studio album, Resta in ascolto, released in 2004; and her second live album, Live in Paris 05.

The song was written by Laura Pausini and Cheope. A Spanish-language version, titled "Tu nombre en mayúsculas" was recorded and included on the Spanish version of "Resta in ascolto", "Escucha".

Both versions of the song were performed during the "World Tour '05", "World Tour 2009" and "Inedito World Tour" concert tours. Live versions of the Italian versions are present in the live albums spawned by such tours: "Live in Paris 05" and "Laura Live World Tour 09" (Inedito World Tour's DVD does not contain the song).

Due to the song not being released physically as CD-Singles, no music video was made.

== Tracks ==
CDS – Promo Warner Music France

1. Il tuo nome in maiuscolo (Live Version) – 3:19
2. Il tuo nome in maiuscolo (Album Version) – 3:19

Digital download

1. Il tuo nome in maiuscolo
2. Tu nombre en mayúsculas

== Charts ==
Chart (2006)	Peak position
US Billboard Latin Songs	37
US Billboard Latin Pop Songs	13
