= Destinazione paradiso (song) =

Single by Gianluca Grignani

from the album Destinazione paradiso
- B-side: "Il gioco di Sandy"
- Released: February 1995
- Genre: Rock, pop
- Length: 3:46
- Label: PolyGram, Mercury
- Songwriter: Gianluca Grignani
- Producers: Massimo Luca, Vince Tempera

Gianluca Grignani singles chronology
"La mia storia tra le dita" (1994)	"Destinazione paradiso" (1995)	"Falco a metà" (1995)

"Destinazione paradiso" is a song written and recorded by Italian singer-songwriter Gianluca Grignani.

The song was first performed by Grignani during the Sanremo Music Festival in 1995, when he competed in the newcomers' section, finishing in sixth place. It later became Grignani's first big success, launching his career in Italy. The song was also recorded by Grignani in a Spanish-language version, titled "Destino paraíso" and included in the Hispanic edition of his album, released with the same title in 1995. This version of the song peaked at number 16 on the Billboard Latin Pop Airplay chart.

In 2006, Italian singer Laura Pausini recorded a cover of both versions of the song, including "Destinazione paradiso" on Io canto and "Destino paraíso" on the Spanish-language version of the album, Yo canto. After being performed during her 2007's concert at the San Siro stadium in Milan, the live performance of the song was released as a single promoting the video album San Siro 2007.

== Background and composition ==
The song was composed by Grignani. During an interview released in 1995, Grignani revealed that he wrote the lyrics of the song in a moment of deep suffering, while he was one step from suicide: "It was more than one year ago [in 1994], my lack of self-confidence exploded in a single moment. That days, my parents were divorcing". Grignani also explained that he didn't intend to extend the message of his song to his whole generation: "I just wanted to express my personal way of being or not being".

The song was performed for the first time on 23 February 1995, during the third night of the 45th Sanremo Music Festival, as Grignani's entry for the newcomers' competition. Grignani was scheduled to perform as the second artist on the night but, for the first time in the contest's history, the order was changed at the last moment, therefore Grignani opened the competition, replacing Danilo Amerio who was late because of a traffic jam. During the night, it received 6,541 placing first on his semi-final and being admitted to the newcomers' final, held on the following day. After performing the song for a second time, Grignani received 9,434 votes, placing sixth in the newcomers' section.

In 2016, Grignani re-recorded the song as a duet with Italian singer Elisa, included in his compilation album Una strada in mezzo al cielo.

== Track listing ==
CD single – "Destinazione paradiso"

1. "Destinazione paradiso" – 3:45
2. "Il gioco di Sandy" 3:35

== Charts ==
Chart (1996)	Peak position
US Latin Pop Airplay (Billboard)	16

== Certifications ==
Region	Certification	Certified units/sales
Italy (FIMI)	Platinum	70,000^{‡}
^{‡} Sales+streaming figures based on certification alone.

== Laura Pausini version ==
"Destinazione paradiso"

Single by Laura Pausini

from the album San Siro 2007
- B-side: "Y mi banda toca el rock"
- Released: 2 November 2007
- Recorded: 2 June 2007; San Siro stadium, Milan, Italy
- Genre: Pop
- Length: 3:50
- Label: Atlantic Records
- Songwriters: Gianluca Grignani, Massimo Luca

Laura Pausini singles chronology
"Non me lo so spiegare" (2007)	"Destinazione paradiso" (2007)	"Y mi banda toca el rock" (2007)

Music video
- "Destinazione paradiso" on YouTube

Italian singer Laura Pausini recorded the song in 2006 for her album Io canto, entirely composed of covers of songs by Italian male singer-songwriters. The Spanish-language version of the song, "Destino paraíso", was also recorded and included in the Hispanic version of the album, Yo canto, released in Spain, South America and in the United States.

Pausini performed the song live during her 2007 only concert, held at the San Siro stadium in Milan. This performance was included in the live and video album San Siro 2007, released on 30 November 2007, and it was chosen as a single from the album, together with "Y mi banda toca el rock".

=== Commercial performance ===
Immediately after its release, the song entered the Italian Top Digital Download, compiled by the Federation of the Italian Music Industry, debuting and peaking at number eight. However, until January 2008, FIMI considered the physical singles chart as the official one in Italy, and "Destinazione paradiso" was released as a digital download only. In January 2008, when the Top Digital Download became the primary singles chart in Italy, the song spent three additional weeks on the chart's top 20, reaching number 14 in the week of 10 January 2008. According to Musica e Dischi, Pausini's version of "Destinazione paradiso" sold 15,000 digital copies in Italy in 2008.

=== Personnel ===
==== Live version ====
Music credits

- Paolo Carta – guitar
- Cesare Chiodo – bass
- Gabriele Fersini – guitar
- Alfredo Golino – drums
- Roberta Granà – backing vocals
- Massimo Guarini – backing vocals
- Adriano Martino – guitar
- Laura Pausini – vocals
- Bruno Zucchetti – piano, keyboards
- Barbara Zappamiglio – backing vocals

Production credits

- Maurizio Maggi – engineer
- Francesco Luzzi – mixing
- Nicola Fantozzi – assistant

==== Studio version ====
Music credits

- John Beasley – piano, keyboards
- Paul Bushnell – bass
- Vinnie Colaiuta – drums
- Samuele Dessì – guitar
- Giancarlo Di Maria – string arrangement
- Bruce Dukow – concert master
- Suzie Katayama – string contractor
- Michael Landau – guitar
- Raphael Padilla – percussions
- Laura Pausini – vocals
- Celso Valli – string arrangement, string director
- Daniel Vuletic – programming, guitar, piano, keyboards, backing vocals, arrangement, string arrangement

Production credits

- Marco Borsatti – engineer
- Samuele Dessì – pre-producer
- Nicola Fantozzi – assistant
- Matt Serrecchio – assistant
- Francesco Luzzi – mixing
- Laura Pausini – producer
- Luca Pellegrini – assistant
- Saverio Principi – engineer
- Tom Syrowsky – assistant
- Michael Tacci – engineer
- Daniel Vuletic – pre-producer, producer

=== Track listing ===
Digital download

1. "Destinazione paradiso" – 3:50
2. "Y mi banda toca el rock" – 3:58

=== Charts ===
Chart (2007)	Peak position
Italy Digital Download (FIMI)	8
