= Live in Paris 05 =

Live album by Laura Pausini
- Released: November 29, 2005
- Recorded: Le Zénith (Paris, France); March 22-23, 2005; Wiltern Theatre (Los Angeles, US); April 22, 2005
- Genre: Pop rock
- Length: 77:53
- Language: Italian, Spanish, English, Portuguese
- Label: Warner Music
- Producer: Laura Pausini, Gabriele Parisi

Laura Pausini chronology
Resta in ascolto/Escucha (2004)	Live in Paris 05 (2005)	Io canto/Yo canto (2006)

Singles from Live in Paris 05
- 1. "La prospettiva di me" Released: November 4, 2005; 2. "Il tuo nome in maiusculo" Released: 2006

Professional ratings
Review scores
Source	Rating
AllMusic	link

Live in Paris 05 is a live album and video album highlighting Italian singer Laura Pausini's World Tour '05 performance at Paris' Le Zénith on March 22-23, 2005. The album was released on November 29, 2005 by Warner Music in CD, DVD, CD+DVD and two-disc DVD editions.

== Track listing ==
No.	Title	Writer(s)	Length
1.	"Gente"	Angelo Valsiglio, Cheope, Marco Marati	05:12
2.	"Un'emergenza d'amore"	Eric Buffat, Laura Pausini, Cheope, Massimo Pacciani	04:08
3.	"Vivimi"	Biagio Antonacci	03:59
4.	"La solitudine"	Valsiglio, Pietro Cremonesi, Federico Cavalli	04:44
5.	"Se fue"	Valsiglio, Cremonesi, Cavalli, Badia	06:28
6.	"Strani amori"	Valsiglio, Roberto Buti, Cheope, Marati, Francesco Tanini	02:16
7.	"Escucha atento"	Daniel, L. Pausini, Cheope, Badia	03:38
8.	"La prospettiva di me"	Daniel, L. Pausini, Cheope	03:16
9.	"Medley: Cuando se ama (Sei que me amavas) / Mi rubi l'anima / Un amico è così / Come se non fosse stato mai amore"	Giuseppe Carella, Cheope, Badia, Gilberto Gil / Valsiglio, Cremonesi, Cavalli / Valsiglio, Buti, Cheope, Marati / Daniel, L. Pausini, Cheope	09:56
10.	"Tra te e il mare"	Antonacci	04:39
11.	"In assenza di te"	Antonio Galbiati, L. Pausini, Cheope	04:44
12.	"Incancellabile"	Giuseppe Carella, Fabrizio Baldoni, Gino de Stefani, Cheope	03:49
13.	"Surrender"	Dane de Viller, Sean Hosein, Steven Smith, Anthony Anderson	04:46
14.	"E ritorno da te"	Daniel, L. Pausini, Cheope	04:27
15.	"Le cose che vivi"	Carella, Baldoni, De Stefani, Cheope, Fabrizio Pausini	07:20
16.	"Víveme" (Unplugged rehearsal at the Wiltern Theatre dressing room, Los Angeles, April 2005)	Antonacci, L. Pausini, Badia	04:47

== Charts ==
Chart (2005–2006)	Peak position
Argentine Albums Chart	7
Belgian Albums Chart (Wallonia)	57
European Albums Chart	63
French Albums Chart	68
Greek Albums Chart	22
Italian Albums Chart	8
Swiss Albums Chart	24
