= San Siro 2007 =

Live album by Laura Pausini
- Released: November 30, 2007
- Recorded: June 2, 2007
- Venue: Stadio San Siro, Milan, Italy
- Genre: Pop rock, Latin pop
- Language: Italian, Spanish, French, English, Portuguese
- Label: Warner Music
- Producer: Laura Pausini

Laura Pausini chronology
Io canto/Yo canto (2006)	San Siro 2007 (2007)	Primavera in anticipo/Primavera anticipada (2008)

Singles from San Siro 2007
- 1. "Destinazione paradiso" Released: November 2, 2007; 2. "Y mi banda toca el rock" Released: November 2, 2007

San Siro 2007 is the second live album by Italian singer Laura Pausini, chronicling her historic performance at Milan's Stadio San Siro on June 2, 2007. The album was released on November 30, 2007 by Warner Music. As of January 2008, the album has sold 120,000 copies in Italy.

== Track listing ==
=== Disc 1 (DVD) ===
No.	Title	Writer(s)	Length
1.	"Io canto" (Includes "Intro: Fai quello che sei")	Riccardo Cocciante, Marco Luberti	5:40
2.	"Gente"	Angelo Valsiglio, Marco Marati, Cheope	4:00
3.	"Destinazione paradiso"	Gianluca Grignani, Massimo Luca	3:46
4.	"E ritorno da te"	Laura Pausini, Cheope, Daniel Vuletic	4:18
5.	"Medley: Dove sei / Mi libre canción / Come il sole all'improvviso (French version) / Benedetta passione"	Valsiglio, Pietro Cremonesi, Federico Cavalli / Lucio Battisti, Mogol / Zucchero, Gino Paoli / Vasco Rossi, Saverio Grandi, Gaetano Curreri	9:13
6.	"La solitudine"	Valsiglio, Cremonesi, Cavalli	4:11
7.	"Ascolta il tuo cuore"	Cheope, Fabrizio Pausini, Vito Mastrofrancesco, Alberto Mastrofrancesco, Charles Cohiba	4:19
8.	"La prospettiva di me / Parlami"	L. Pausini, Cheope, Vuletic	4:21
9.	"Víveme / Vivimi"	Biagio Antonacci, L. Pausini, Badia	5:07
10.	"Tra te e il mare"	Antonacci	4:26
11.	"Un'emergenza d'amore"	L. Pausini, Cheope, Massimo Pacciani, E. Buffat	4:10
12.	"Dispárame, dispara"	Samuele Bersani, Lucio Dalla, Giuseppe d'Onghia, Ortiz, L. Pausini	4:12
13.	"Medley: Prendo te / She (Uguale a lei) / Cinque giorni / Strani amori"	L. Pausini / Charles Aznavour, Herbert Kretzmer, L. Pausini / Michele Zarrillo, Vincenzo Incenzo / Cheope, Roberto Buti, Valsiglio, Marati, Francesco Tanini	8:19
14.	"Resta in ascolto"	L. Pausini, Cheope, Vuletic	3:32
15.	"Due"	Raf, Cheope	4:39
16.	"La Isla Bonita / Y mi banda toca el rock"	Madonna, Patrick Leonard, Bruce Gaitsch / Ivano Fossati, Hidalgo	6:33
17.	"Non me lo so spiegare" (duet with Tiziano Ferro)	Tiziano Ferro	4:59
18.	"Medley: Quando / In assenza di te / Surrender / Apaixonados como nós / Scrivimi / Favola"	Pino Daniele / L. Pausini, Cheope, Antonio Galbiati / Dane Deviller, Sean Hosein, Steven Smith, Anthony Anderson / Cheope, Buti, Roberto Capaccioli, Cláudio Rabello / Nino Buonocore, Michele de Vitis / Eros Ramazzotti, Adelio Cogliati, Piero Cassano	15:42
19.	"Le cose che vivi"	Cheope, F. Pausini, Fabrizio Baldoni, Giuseppe Carella, Gino de Stefani	7:46
20.	"Una storia che vale"	L. Pausini, Cheope, Vuletic	7:10
21.	"Come se non fosse stato mai amore"	L. Pausini, Cheope, Vuletic	4:03
22.	"Incancellabile"	Cheope, Baldoni, Carella, de Stefani	7:07
23.	"Mi dispiace" (Studio version, including credits)	Giuseppe Dati, Goffredo Orlandi	3:20
24.	"Backstage"	—	17:44

=== Disc 2 (CD) ===
No.	Title	Writer(s)	Length
1.	"Io canto" (Includes "Intro: Fai quello che sei")	Cocciante, Luberti	5:13
2.	"Gente"	Cheope, Marati, Valsiglio	3:50
3.	"Destinazione paradiso"	Grignani, Luca	3:50
4.	"Medley: Dove sei / Mi libre canción / Come il sole all'improvviso (French version) / Benedetta passione"	Cavalli, Cremonesi, Valsiglio / Battisti, Mogol / Zucchero, Paoli / Rossi, Grandi, Curreri	7:53
5.	"La solitudine"	Cavalli, Cremonesi, Valsiglio	4:14
6.	"Ascolta il tuo cuore"	Cheope, F. Pausini, V. Mastrofrancesco, A. Mastrofrancesco, C. Cohiba	4:17
7.	"La prospettiva di me / Parlami"	L. Pausini, Cheope, Vuletic	4:25
8.	"Víveme / Vivimi"	Biagio Antonacci, L. Pausini, Badia	3:54
9.	"Prendo te / She (Uguale a lei) / Cinque giorni / Strani amori"	L. Pausini / Aznavour, Kretzmer, L. Pausini / Zarrillo, Incenzo / Cheope, Buti, Valsiglio, Marati, Tanini	7:29
10.	"Dispárame dispara"	Bersani, Dalla, d'Onghia, Ortiz, L. Pausini	4:09
11.	"Non me lo so spiegare" (Duet with Tiziano Ferro)	Ferro	4:42
12.	"Y mi banda toca el rock"	Fossati, Hidalgo	3:58
13.	"Medley: Quando / In assenza di te / Surrender / Apaixonados como nós / Scrivimi"	Daniele / L. Pausini, Cheope, Galbiati / Deviller, Hosein, Smith, Anderson / Cheope, Buti, Capaccioli, Rabello / Buonocore, de Vitis	8:22
14.	"Come se non fosse stato mai amore"	L. Pausini, Cheope, Vuletic	4:01
15.	"Una storia che vale"	L. Pausini, Cheope, Vuletic	6:11

== Charts ==
=== Weekly charts ===
Chart (2007)	Peak position
Belgian Albums Chart (Wallonia)	57
Croatian Foreign Albums Chart	30
European Albums Chart	57
French Albums Chart	135
Italian Albums Chart	5
Italian DVD Chart	3
Mexican Albums Chart	50
Spanish DVD Chart	10
Swiss Albums Chart	26

=== Year-end charts ===
Chart (2007)	Position
Italian Albums Chart	19
Italian DVD Chart	9
Chart (2008)	Position
Italian Albums Chart	38
Italian DVD Chart	12
