= Io canto =

IO CANTO/YO CANTO
- Italian-language edition

Studio album by Laura Pausini
- Released: November 10, 2006 (Italian-language) November 14, 2006 (Spanish-language)
- Recorded: Logic Studio; Milan, Italy; Larione 10; Florence, Italy; Henson Recording Studios; Los Angeles, US; Studio Impatto; Bologna, Italy; ORS (Oliveta Recording Studio); Castel Bolognese, Italy; Sage Studio; Los Angeles, US
- Genre: Pop rock
- Length: 68:07
- Languages: Italian, French, Spanish
- Label: Warner Music
- Producers: Laura Pausini (also exec.), Celso Valli, Dado Parisini, Daniel Vuletic

Laura Pausini chronology
| Live in Paris 05 (2005) | IO CANTO/YO CANTO (2006) | San Siro 2007 (2007) |

Alternative cover
- Spanish-language edition

Singles from IO CANTO/YO CANTO
- 1. "Io canto" Released: October 13, 2006; 2. "Spaccacuore" Released: January 19, 2007; 3. "Non me lo so spiegare" Released: March 23, 2007

Professional ratings
Review scores
| Source | Rating |
|---|---|
| AllMusic | 4/5 stars |
| Musica e dischi | 4/5 stars |

IO CANTO and YO CANTO (English: I SING) are the ninth studio albums by Italian singer Laura Pausini. The Italian-language edition was released on November 10, 2006, while the Spanish-language edition was released on November 14, 2006, by Warner Music. YO CANTO–IO CANTO is a limited-edition double album featuring both the Italian– and Spanish-language editions. This marks the first instance in Pausini's multilingual music career in which both editions are offered in a single release. Warner Music issued a third edition pressed exclusively for the French market. This pressing of IO CANTO features the bonus track "Je chante", a partial French adaptation of the Italian "Io canto".

The album consists entirely of covers. Its repertoire spans three decades of Italian pop music history. Pausini pays homage to fellow Italian singer–songwriters whose lyrical work has influenced her artistic sensibility throughout the years. In the album's liner notes Pausini reveals:

Here is the music I listen to when I'm at my saddest, or when I feel a moment is special, the songs I used to sing as a young girl when I first started performing, and above all, those which taught me to love music, and how music can move you so deeply, regardless of its genre or style.

Yo canto features "Dispárame, dispara", also known as "Corazón roto"—opening theme of the Mexican telenovela Amar sin límites (2006). Chile's Canal 13 employed the album's title track for its television series Cantando por un sueño. The album won the Latin Grammy in 2007 for Best Female Pop Vocal Album.

== Inception ==
The decision to present a cover album stemmed from a "pending debt" to Pausini's musical roots and homeland. She first conceptualized the idea approximately ten years prior to Io canto's publication. The idea, however, did not take root until Pausini's golden year in 2006 that culminated in a Grammy Award for Best Latin Pop Album for Escucha (2004) at the 48th Annual Grammy Awards. At the post–Grammy press conference, journalists remarked how they admired Pausini for never having abandoned her brand of "Italian pop of always" despite her classification as a "Latin music" artist. Alluding to Pausini's "Italian–ness," Randy Cordova for The Arizona Republic concurred, "She doesn't pander to the crowd with Latin guitars, reggaeton remixes or Cuban percussion. [Her music] is all very organic." This acknowledgement moved Pausini to honor Italy by recording a cover album of Italian "classics". Pausini also wished to export underappreciated Italian music to the world as a consequence of her multilingualism furthermore the album has sold 2 million copies worldwide.

The song "Come il sole all'improvviso" and its Spanish counterpart version have lyrics in French language.

== Track listing ==
=== Io canto ===
| No. | Title | Lyrics | Music | Length |
|---|---|---|---|---|
| 1. | "Io canto" | Marco Luberti | Riccardo Cocciante | 4:16 |
| 2. | "Due" | Raf, Cheope | Raf | 4:38 |
| 3. | "Scrivimi" | Nino Buonocore, Michele de Vitis | Nino Buonocore | 3:52 |
| 4. | "Mi Libre Canción" (Duet with Juanes) | Mogol | Lucio Battisti | 4:33 |
| 5. | "Destinazione paradiso" | Gianluca Grignani, Massimo Luca | Grignani | 3:39 |
| 6. | "Stella gemella" | Eros Ramazzotti, Adelio Cogliati | Ramazzotti, Giuseppe Tosetto, Mario Lavezzi | 4:37 |
| 7. | "Come il sole all'improvviso" (Duet with Johnny Hallyday) | Gino Paoli | Zucchero | 3:19 |
| 8. | "Cinque giorni" | Vincenzo Incenzo | Michele Zarrillo | 4:04 |
| 9. | "La mia banda suona il rock" | Ivano Fossati | Fossati | 3:45 |
| 10. | "Spaccacuore" | Samuele Bersani, Lucio Dalla | Bersani, Giuseppe d'Onghia | 4:08 |
| 11. | "Anima fragile" | Vasco Rossi | Rossi | 3:26 |
| 12. | "Non me lo so spiegare" (Duet with Tiziano Ferro) | Tiziano Ferro | Ferro | 4:32 |
| 13. | "Nei giardini che nessuno sa"" | Renato Zero, Danilo Riccardi | Zero, Riccardi | 5:13 |
| 14. | "In una stanza quasi rosa" | Biagio Antonacci | Antonacci | 4:33 |
| 15. | "Quando" | Pino Daniele | Daniele | 3:41 |
| 16. | "Strada facendo" | Claudio Baglioni | Baglioni | 5:40 |

French edition bonus track
| No. | Title | Lyrics | Music | French adaptation | Length |
|---|---|---|---|---|---|
| 17. | "Je chante (Io canto)" (Franco-Italian Version) | Marco Luberti | Riccardo Cocciante | Jean-Pierre Lemaire | 4:22 |

iTunes pre-order edition bonus tracks
| No. | Title | Lyrics | Music | Length |
|---|---|---|---|---|
| 17. | "È, non è" | Niccolò Fabi | Niccolò Fabi | 3:38 |
| 18. | "Non me lo so spiegare" (solo version) | Ferro | Ferro | 4:35 |
| 19. | "Il mio canto libero" (solo version) | Mogol | Lucio Battisti | 4:40 |
| 20. | "Come il sole all'improvviso" (solo version) | Gino Paoli | Zucchero | 3:22 |

=== Yo canto ===
| No. | Title | Lyrics | Music | Spanish adaptation | Length |
|---|---|---|---|---|---|
| 1. | "Yo Canto" | Marco Luberti | Riccardo Cocciante | Frank Andrada | 04:17 |
| 2. | "Dos" | Raf, Cheope | Raf | Ortiz, Laura Pausini | 04:39 |
| 3. | "Escríbeme" | Nino Buonocore, Michele de Vitis | Nino Buonocore | Ortiz, Pausini | 03:53 |
| 4. | "Mi Libre Canción" (Duet With Juanes) | Mogol | Lucio Battisti | Carlos Ramón | 04:34 |
| 5. | "Destino Paraíso" | Gianluca Grignani, Massimo Luca | Grignani | Ignacio Ballesteros Díaz | 03:40 |
| 6. | "Estrella Gemela" | Eros Ramazzotti, Adelio Cogliati | Eros Ramazzotti, Giuseppe Tosetto, Mario Lavezzi | Ignacio De Loyola Mano Guillén, Javier Salvador Sánchez Bori, José Javier Mano Guillén | 04:38 |
| 7. | "Cómo El Sol Inesperado" | Gino Paoli | Zucchero | Ortiz, Pausini | 03:20 |
| 8. | "Cinco Días" | Vincenzo Incenzo | Michele Zarrillo | Ballesteros Díaz | 04:05 |
| 9. | "Y Mi Banda Toca El Rock" | Ivano Fossati | Fossati | Hidalgo | 03:46 |
| 10. | "Dispárame, Dispara" | Samuele Bersani, Lucio Dalla | Bersani, Giuseppe d'Onghia | Ortiz, Pausini | 04:09 |
| 11. | "Corazón Frágil" | Vasco Rossi | Rossi | Ortiz, Pausini | 03:27 |
| 12. | "No Me Lo Puedo Explicar" (Duet With Tiziano Ferro) | Tiziano Ferro | Ferro | Ferro | 04:33 |
| 13. | "En Los Jardines Donde Nadie Va" | Renato Zero, Danilo Riccardi | Zero, Riccardi | Ortiz, Pausini | 05:14 |
| 14. | "En Un Cuarto Casi Rosa" | Biagio Antonacci | Antonacci | Ortiz, Pausini | 04:34 |
| 15. | "Cuando" | Pino Daniele | Daniele | Ortiz, Pausini | 03:42 |
| 16. | "Por El Camino" | Claudio Baglioni | Baglioni | Ortiz | 05:41 |

iTunes pre-order edition bonus tracks
| No. | Title | Lyrics | Music | Spanish adaptation | Length |
|---|---|---|---|---|---|
| 17. | "Es, No Es" | Niccolò Fabi | Niccolò Fabi | Carmen Fernández | 03:39 |
| 18. | "No Me Lo Puedo Explicar" (Sólo Version) | Ferro | Ferro | Ferro | 04:33 |
| 19. | "Mi Libre Canción" (Sólo Version) | Mogol | Battisti | Ramón | 04:41 |

== Personnel ==
- Vinnie Colaiuta: drums on tracks 1, 4, 5, 6, 10, 13, 15, 16
- Michael Landau, Tim Pierce: guitars
- Max Costa: programming

== Chart performance ==
The first single "Io canto" debuted at No. 3 on the Italian chart at the beginning of November, and it peaked at No. 1 in the week before Christmas. It has spent a total of 4 weeks at the top spot. The album debuted at No. 1 in the Italian chart with 270,000 copies shipped in the first week. At the end of 2006 it became the Italian's best-selling album of the year, selling over 500,000 copies. It has spent a total of 8 weeks at No. 1. As of October 2008 the album sold over 2 million copies worldwide.

== Charts ==
=== Charts ===
| Chart (2006–2007) | Peak position |
|---|---|
| Belgian Albums (Ultratop Flanders) | 93 |
| Belgian Albums (Ultratop Wallonia) | 8 |
| Croatian Albums (HDU) | 14 |
| Croatian Foreign Albums (HDU) | 3 |
| Dutch Albums (Album Top 100) | 66 |
| European Top 100 Albums (Billboard) | 10 |
| Finnish Albums (Suomen virallinen lista) | 33 |
| French Albums (SNEP) | 15 |
| Greek Albums (IFPI) | 4 |
| Italian Albums (FIMI) | 1 |
| Spanish Albums (Promusicae) | 15 |
| Swiss Albums (Schweizer Hitparade) | 1 |
| US Latin Pop Albums (Billboard) | 9 |
| US Top Latin Albums (Billboard) | 22 |
| US Top Heatseekers (Billboard) | 12 |

=== Year-end charts ===
| Chart (2006) | Position |
|---|---|
| Italian Albums (FIMI) | 1 |
| Swiss Albums (Schweizer Hitparade) | 20 |

| Chart (2007) | Position |
|---|---|
| European Top 100 Albums (Billboard) | 41 |
| Italian Albums (FIMI) | 5 |
| Swiss Music (Schweizer Hitparade) | 33 |

| Chart (2008) | Position |
|---|---|
| Italian Albums (FIMI) | 78 |

== Sales and certifications ==
| Region | Certification | Certified units/sales |
|---|---|---|
| France (SNEP) | Gold | 75,000^{*} |
| Italy (FIMI) sales 2006-2007 | 6× Platinum | 700,000 |
| Italy (FIMI) sales since 2009 | Gold | 40,000^{*} |
| Mexico (AMPROFON) | Gold | 50,000^{^} |
| Switzerland (IFPI Switzerland) | Platinum | 30,000^{^} |
Summaries
| Worldwide | — | 2,000,000 |
^{*} Sales figures based on certification alone.^{^} Shipments figures based on certification alone.

== Tour ==
Pausini chose not to do a tour to promote Io canto. Instead, she opted for a single concert in Milan, in the Stadio San Siro, making history as the first female artist to play a gig in this venue. The sold-out concert happened on 2 June 2007. Approximately 70,000 fans attended in the incessant rain. Tiziano Ferro appeared for a duet. The two and a half-hour concert has been released on DVD in December 2007.
