= Come se non fosse stato mai amore =

Single by Laura Pausini

from the album Resta in ascolto
- Released: 25 March 2005
- Recorded: 2004; Studio Impatto (Bologna, Italy), Abbey Road Studios (London, UK)
- Genre: Pop, latin pop
- Length: 4:00
- Label: Atlantic Records
- Songwriters: Laura Pausini, Cheope, Daniel
- Producer: Celso Valli

Laura Pausini singles chronology
"Vivimi" (2004)	"Come se non fosse stato mai amore" (2005)	"Benedetta passione" (2005)

Music video
- "Come se non fosse stato mai amore" on YouTube

"Come se non fosse stato mai amore" (English: "As if It Wasn't Love Anymore") is a song recorded by Italian singer Laura Pausini and released on 25 March 2005 as the third single from her 2004 album Resta in ascolto.

A Spanish-language version of the song, titled "Como si no nos hubiéramos amado", was featured on the on Escucha, the version of Resta in ascolto released in the Hispanic market. After being released as a single, "Como si no nos hubiéramos amado" topped the Billboard Latin Pop Airplay chart in 2006. This version reached number 10 in the US Hot Latin Chart, becoming her fourth and last top ten hit there. It also received an ASCAP Latin Music Award in 2007 for Pop/Ballad Song.

== Live performances ==
Pausini performed the song during the Italian singing competition Festivalbar in 2005. The song was also included in a medley during Pausini's concert held at Paris' Le Zénith on 22 March 2005, recorded and released as a video album under the title Live in Paris 05. On 4 March 2006, she performed the song during the final of the 56th Sanremo Music Festival, where she was invited as a guest artist.

The song was also included in the setlist of the concert held by Pausini on 2 June 2007 at the San Siro Stadium in Milan, later released as a CD and DVD with the title San Siro 2007. 2009's album Laura Live World Tour 09 also features a live version of the song, recorded in Florence during Pausini's World Tour 2009.

== Cover versions ==
On 5 May 2012, Italian singer Marco Carta performed the song during the sixth night of the eleventh series of the talent show Amici di Maria De Filippi. Carta's live cover was later released as a digital single, peaking at number 10 on the Italian Singles Chart.

== Charts ==
Chart (2006)	Peak position
US Hot Latin Songs (Billboard)	10
US Latin Pop Airplay (Billboard)	1

== See also ==
- List of number-one Billboard Hot Latin Pop Airplay of 2006
