= Resta in ascolto (song) =

2004 single by Laura Pausini

Single by Laura Pausini

from the album Resta in ascolto
- Released: 10 September 2004
- Genre: Pop rock
- Length: 3:29
- Label: Warner Music
- Songwriters: Laura Pausini, Cheope, Daniel
- Producer: Laura Pausini

Laura Pausini singles chronology
"If That's Love" (2004)	"Resta in ascolto" (2004)	"Vivimi" (2004)

"Resta in ascolto" (English: Keep listening) is a pop rock ballad written by Laura Pausini, Daniel and Cheope and recorded by Italian singer Laura Pausini. It was released on 10 September 2004 as the first single from Pausini's album Resta in ascolto. The single reached number one in Italian Singles Chart, and it was her first number one single since "La solitudine". Pausini also recorded a Spanish-language version of the song, adapted by J. Badia and titled "Escucha atento". This version of the song was released as a single in the Hispanic market and it was included in the Spanish-language edition of her album, Escucha.

== Music video ==
The music video for the song was filmed in 35 mm and directed by Paolo Monico. Released on 27 September 2004, it was shot in Los Angeles, between Venice, Santa Monica and the Vazquez Rocks. The cinematography is by Patrizio Patrizi, while Francesca Chiappetta was credited as the executive producer of the video.

In the video, Pausini walks through the roads of Los Angeles. After witnessing the arrest of a man, Pausini enters in a café, where she meets a boy handcuffed to his girlfriend, and she soon realizes that the barman is also handcuffed. Several other people are later shown with handcuffs on them, representing relationships which, for better or for worse, look to be unbreakable. Only in the second part of the video, some of the people met by Pausini are able to free themselves from their duties, while others will be trapped forever.

Other scenes, filmed from a helicopter, show Pausini singing on top of a mountain, and they were shot without using any body double. This part of the video wants to highlight Pausini's personal willing of change and independence.

== Track listings ==
"Resta in ascolto" – CD single and digital download

1. "Resta in ascolto" – 3:29

"Resta in ascolto" – CD-maxi (Atlantic 5050467515628)

1. "Resta in ascolto" – 3:29
2. "Escucha atento" – 3:29
3. "Resta in ascolto" (Instrumental) – 3:29

"Escucha atento" – CD single (Atlantic 5050467529229)

1. "Escucha atento" – 3:29
2. "Resta in ascolto" – 3:29
3. "Resta in ascolto" (T&F Vs. Moltosugo Radio Edit) – 4:01

"Escucha atento" – Digital download

1. "Escucha atento" – 3:31

"Resta in ascolto" – Remixes EP (Warner Music Italy 5050467619920)

1. "Resta in ascolto" (T&F Vs. Moltosugo Radio Edit) – 4:01
2. "Escucha atento" (T&F Vs. Moltosugo Radio Edit) – 4:01
3. "Resta in ascolto" (Luca Cassani Radio Remix) – 4:27
4. "Resta in ascolto" (Andrea T. Mendoza Vs. Tibet Radio Mix) – 3:44
5. "Escucha atento" (Kelly Pitiuso & Strump Dub Mix) – 7:34
6. "Resta in ascolto" (T&F Vs. Moltosugo Klub Mix) – 7:14

== Charts ==
=== Peak positions ===
Chart (2004–05)	Peak position
Belgium (Ultratip Bubbling Under Flanders)	15
Belgium (Ultratop 50 Wallonia)	35
France Airplay (SNEP)	12
Greece (IFPI)	46
Italy (FIMI)	1
Italy Airplay (Music Control)	2
Spain (Promusicae)	3
Switzerland (Schweizer Hitparade)	25
US Hot Latin Songs (Billboard)	17
US Latin Pop Airplay (Billboard)	9

=== Year-end charts ===
Chart (2004)	Position
Italy (FIMI)	19
Chart (2017)	Position
Peru General (Monitor Latino)	89

== See also ==
- List of number-one hits of 2004 (Italy)
