= Surrender (Laura Pausini song) =

2002 single

Single by Laura Pausini

from the album From the Inside
- Released: 9 September 2002
- Length: 3:58
- Label: Atlantic
- Songwriters: Dane Deviller; Sean Hosein; Steven Smith; Anthony Anderson
- Producers: Laura Pausini; Alfredo Cerruti; Dado Parisini

Laura Pausini singles chronology
"Sei solo tu" (2002)	"Surrender" (2002)	"I Need Love" (2003)

"Surrender" is a song by Italian singer Laura Pausini from her eighth album, From the Inside (2002). The song was written by Dane Deviller, Sean Hosein, Steven Smith, and Anthony Anderson. "Surrender" was released on 9 September 2002 in the United States as part of a project aiming to promote the singer in America, and the track reached number one on the Billboard Dance Club Play chart. In 2003, the song was issued across Europe and Australia. In 2013, Pausini recorded a new version for her greatest hits album, 20 – The Greatest Hits, in a slower tempo.

== Live performances ==
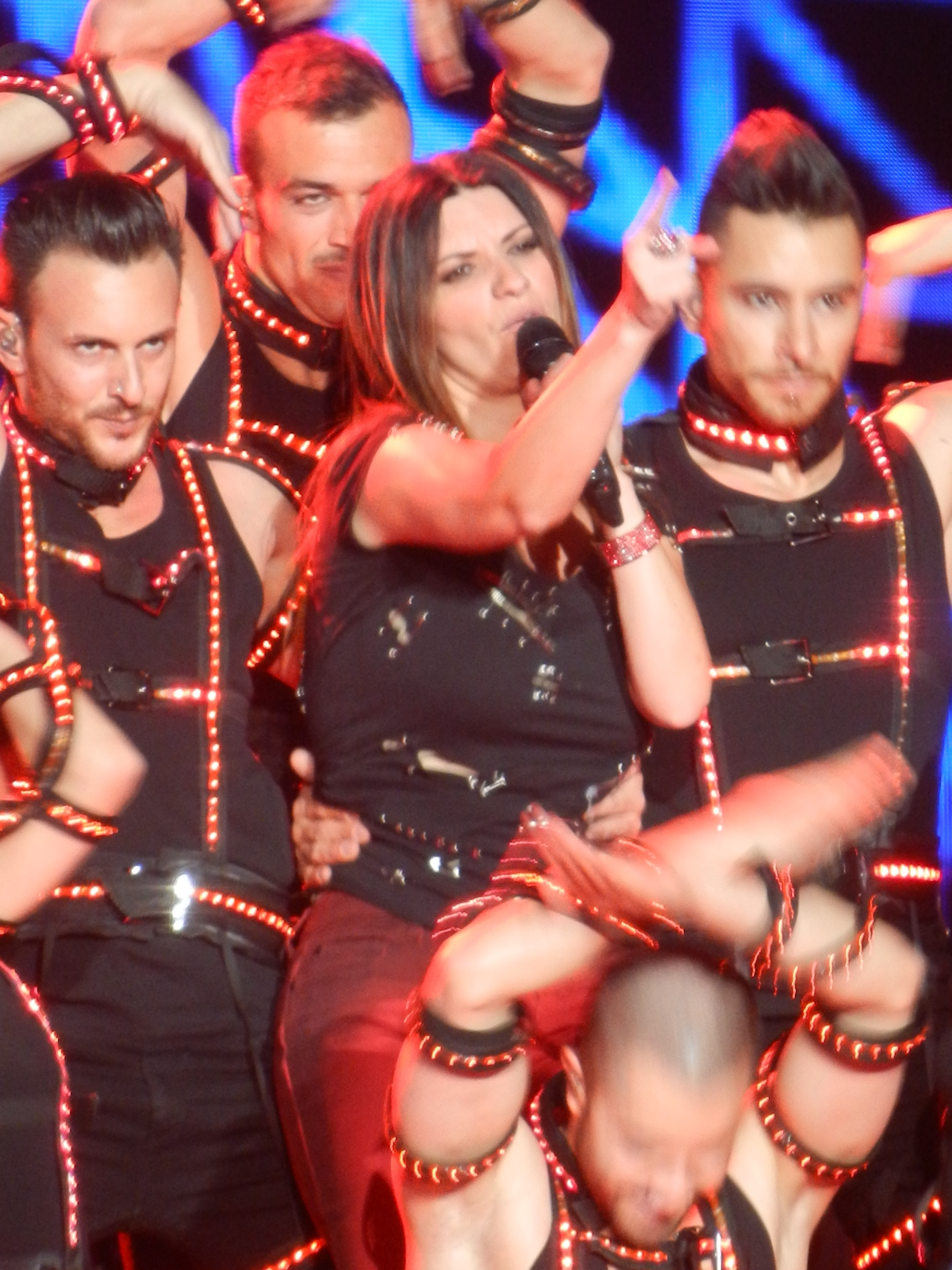
Laura Pausini performing the song during the Inedito World Tour in 2012

Surrender was performed during the shows of the 2005 World Tour, World Tour 2009 and Inedito World Tour. During the World Tour 2009 shows, the song's rhythm was changed in its entirety, with a new acoustic version, much like the performance available on the San Siro 2007 concert video. The version present in the DVD originated by Inedito is once again the dance version, included in a medley with "Bellissimo così".

== Track listings ==
US maxi-single, digital EP (2002)

1. "Surrender" (Mike Rizzo Global Club Mix) – 8:45
2. "Surrender" (Ford's Club Mix) – 7:45
3. "Surrender" (Nick Flerce's Polarbabies Club) – 8:04
4. "Surrender" (Franck Amorous Chillout Mix) – 5:04
5. "Surrender" (Lenny B Club Mix) – 8:35
6. "Surrender" (Eric Kupper Extended Mix) – 5:52
7. "Surrender" (Mike Rizzo Global Dub) – 5:44

Double 12-inch single – US (2002)

- Disc 1 – Side A
1. "Surrender" (Mike Rizzo Global Club Mix) – 8:45
- Disc 1 – Side B
1. "Surrender" (Nick Fierce's Polarbabies Club Mix) – 8:04
- Disc 2 – Side A
1. "Surrender" (Ford's Club Mix) – 7:44
2. "Surrender" (Franck Amorous Chillout Mix) – 5:04
- Disc 2 – Side B
1. "Surrender" (Lenny B Club Mix) – 8:34
2. "Surrender" (Mike Rizzo Global Dub) – 5:44

Digital download (2002)

1. "Surrender" (Ultamix) – 3:56

CD single – Europe (2003)

1. "Surrender" (Ultramix) – 3:56
2. "Surrender" (Mike Taylor Radio Mix) - 4:06
3. "Surrender" (Eric Kupper Mix) – 4:06
4. "Surrender" (Mike Rizzo Mix) – 4:05

CD single – Australia (2003)

1. "Surrender" (Ultamix) – 3:57
2. "Surrender" (Mike Rizzo Global Club Mix) – 8:47
3. "Surrender" (Lenny B. Club Mix) – 8:36
4. "Surrender" (Ford's Club Mix) – 7:45
5. "Surrender" (Toronto Chilled Edit) – 3:26

Maxi CD single – Germany (2003)

1. "Surrender" (Ultamix) – 3:58
2. "Surrender" (Mark Taylor Radio Mix) – 4:09
3. "Surrender" (Mike Rizzo Radio Mix) – 4:05
4. "Surrender" (Toronto Chilled Edit) – 5:05

CD single – Germany (2003)

1. "Surrender" (Ultamix) – 3:57
2. "Surrender" (Mike Rizzo Global Club Mix) – 8:45

== Charts ==
=== Weekly charts ===
Weekly chart performance for "Surrender"
Chart (2002–2003)	Peak position
Australia (ARIA)	61
Belgium (Ultratop 50 Flanders)	25
Belgium (Ultratop 50 Wallonia)	39
Canada (Nielsen SoundScan)	8
Canada CHR (Nielsen BDS)	7
Hungary (Rádiós Top 40)	31
Italy (FIMI)	7
Italy Airplay (Music Control)	5
Netherlands (Dutch Top 40)	37
Netherlands (Single Top 100)	31
Romania (Romanian Top 100)	4
Sweden (Sverigetopplistan)	38
Switzerland (Schweizer Hitparade)	34
US Dance Club Songs (Billboard) Remixes	1
US Dance Singles Sales (Billboard) Remixes	4

=== Year-end charts ===
2002 year-end chart performance for "Surrender"
Chart (2002)	Position
Canada (Nielsen SoundScan)	48

2003 year-end chart performance for "Surrender"
Chart (2003)	Position
Romania (Romanian Top 100)	16
US Dance Club Play (Billboard)	9

== Release history ==
Release dates and formats for "Surrender"
Region	Date	Format(s)	Label(s)	Ref.
United States	9 September 2002	Rhythmic contemporary radio	Atlantic	
United States	11 November 2002	Contemporary hit; adult contemporary; hot adult contemporary radio	Atlantic	
Australia	17 March 2003	CD	Atlantic	

== See also ==
- List of number-one dance singles of 2003 (U.S.)
