= Vivimi =

2005 single by Laura Pausini

Single by Laura Pausini

from the album Resta in ascolto
- Released: February 2005
- Recorded: 2004
- Genre: Pop
- Length: 3:54
- Label: Warner Music Italia
- Songwriter: Biagio Antonacci
- Producer: Biagio Antonacci

Laura Pausini singles chronology
"Resta in ascolto" (2004)	"Vivimi" (2005)	"Come se non fosse stato mai amore" (2005)

"Víveme"

Single by Laura Pausini featuring Alejandro Sanz

from the album 20 - The Greatest Hits
- Released: 17 December 2013
- Genre: Latin pop
- Label: Warner Music
- Songwriters: Biagio Antonacci; Laura Pausini; Ignacio Ballesteros

Laura Pausini singles chronology
"Se non te" (2013)	"Víveme" (2013)	"Se fue" (2014)

Alejandro Sanz singles chronology
"This Game is Over" (2013)	"Viveme" (2013)	"Un Zombie a la Intemperie" (2015)

Vivimi (English: Live through me) is the second single released in February 2005 from Italian singer Laura Pausini's sixth Italian album Resta in ascolto. "Víveme" is the Spanish-language version adapted by Pausini and Badia which was featured as the theme song in the Mexican telenovela La Madrastra.

It was the second time that Biagio Antonacci wrote a song for Laura Pausini after the smash hit "Tra te e il mare" in 2000.

The song was re-recorded in 2013 as a duet with Spanish singer Alejandro Sanz for Pausini's compilation album 20 – The Greatest Hits. The Spanish-language duet was released as a single in December 2013.

== Cover versions ==
- Mexican singer Daniela Romo included a cover of the Spanish-language version of the song in her album Sueños de Cabaret, released in 2008.
- Chinese actress-singer Yuan Quan covered the Chinese version of the song, titled The Poems that I've Read, in her album The Lonely Flower in 2007.

== Track listing ==
CD-single

1. "Vivimi"
2. "Vivimi" (Instrumental)

== Charts and certifications ==
=== Peak positions ===
Original version

Chart (2005–2012)	Peak position
Belgium (Ultratip Bubbling Under Wallonia)	15
Hungary (Single Top 40)	10
Switzerland (Schweizer Hitparade)	38
US Hot Latin Songs (Billboard)	6
US Latin Pop Airplay (Billboard)	2
US Regional Mexican Airplay (Billboard)	2

2013 version (feat. Alejandro Sanz)

Chart (2013)	Peak position
Mexico (Billboard Espanol Airplay)	2
Mexico Pop (Monitor Latino)	19
Spain (Promusicae)	20
US Hot Latin Songs (Billboard)	34
US Latin Airplay (Billboard)	24
US Latin Pop Airplay (Billboard)	9

=== Year-end charts ===
Chart (2005)	Position
US Hot Latin Songs (Billboard)	9

=== Certifications ===
Region	Certification	Certified units/sales
Italy (FIMI)	Gold	50,000^{‡}
^{‡} Sales+streaming figures based on certification alone.
