= Resta in ascolto =

Resta in ascolto/Escucha

Studio album by Laura Pausini
- Released: October 22, 2004
- Recorded: New Logic Studio (Milan, Italy); Studio Impatto (Bologna, Italy); The Chill Building (Santa Monica, California); AIR Lyndhurst (London, England); Abbey Road Studios (London, England); Whitfield Street Studios (London, England)
- Genres: Pop rock; Latin pop
- Length: 41:46
- Languages: Italian, Spanish
- Labels: Atlantic, Warner Music
- Producers: Laura Pausini, Dado Parisini, Celso Valli, Rick Nowels, Alfredo Cerruti

Laura Pausini chronology
From the Inside (2002)	Resta in ascolto/Escucha (2004)	Live in Paris 05 (2005)

Singles from Resta in ascolto/Escucha
- 1. "Resta in ascolto" Released: September 10, 2004; 2. "Vivimi" Released: November 26, 2004; 3. "Come se non fosse stato mai amore" Released: March 25, 2005; 4. "Benedetta passione" Released: June 24, 2005; 5. "La prospettiva di me" Released: November 4, 2005

Professional ratings
Review scores
Source	Rating
AllMusic	4/5 stars
Musica e dischi	4/5 stars

Resta in ascolto and Escucha (English: Keep Listening or Listen) are the eighth studio albums by Italian singer Laura Pausini, released by Warner Music on October 22, 2004. The Spanish-language edition won a Grammy Award for Best Latin Pop Album in 2006, making her the first and only Italian female to receive such award.

Escucha features "Víveme", theme song of the highly successful Mexican telenovela La madrastra (2005). The song's exposure extended to the United States when Univision acquired the telenovela and began its broadcast of La madrastra in March 2005. In September 2006, following a year of praise and formal recognition—particularly from the National Academy of Recording Arts and Sciences—Warner Music released special edition CD+DVDs of Escucha in Argentina and the United States. The special editions feature previously unreleased bonus tracks presented in music video form. These tracks include "Prendo te" and "De tu amor".

Promoting the album, Pausini embarked on a world tour during the early 6 months of 2005. The tour has yielded a DVD.

== Background ==
The recording is on the subject of a break-up and was written in 2002, during Pausini's separation from her ex-boyfriend and producer Alfredo Cerruti.

The album features the song "Mi abbandono a te" / "Me abandono a ti", co-written by Pausini, Rick Nowels and Madonna. It also includes the ballad "Vivimi" / "Viveme", written by Biagio Antonacci, and the single "Benedetta passione" / "Bendecida pasión", penned by Italian rock-star Vasco Rossi. The album is mainly focused on themes of anger, bitterness, desire for independence and interior peace, but also features a song about the Iraq War, in which Pausini sings about Ali Ismail Abbas, a boy who was severely injured in a nighttime rocket attack near Baghdad in 2003.

== Track listing ==
=== Resta in ascolto ===
No.	Title	Lyrics	Music	Length
1.	"La prospettiva di me"	Laura Pausini, Cheope	Daniel	3:05
2.	"Vivimi"	Biagio Antonacci	Antonacci	3:54
3.	"Resta in ascolto"	Pausini, Cheope	Daniel	3:30
4.	"Il tuo nome in maiuscolo"	Pausini, Cheope	Daniel	3:19
5.	"Benedetta passione"	Vasco Rossi	Gaetano Curreri, Saverio Grandi	4:11
6.	"Come se non fosse stato mai amore"	Pausini, Cheope	Daniel	3:59
7.	"Così importante"	Pausini, Chiodo	Cesare Chiodo	3:28
8.	"Parlami"	Pausini, Cheope	Daniel	3:43
9.	"Dove l'aria è polvere"	Pausini, Cheope	Antonio Galbiati	3:47
10.	"Amare veramente"	Pausini, Chiodo	Chiodo	4:00
11.	"Mi abbandono a te"	Madonna, Rick Nowels, Pausini	Madonna, Nowels	4:42

=== Escucha ===
No.	Title	Lyrics	Music	Spanish adaptation	Length
1.	"Mi Perspectiva"	Laura Pausini, Cheope	Daniel	Pausini, Badia	03:06
2.	"Víveme"	Biagio Antonacci	Antonacci	Pausini, Badia	03:55
3.	"Escucha Atento"	Pausini, Cheope	Daniel	Badia	03:30
4.	"Tú Nombre En Mayúsculas"	Pausini, Cheope	Daniel	Badia	03:20
5.	"Bendecida Pasión"	Vasco Rossi	Gaetano Curreri, Saverio Grandi	Pausini	04:12
6.	"Cómo Sí No Nos Hubiéramos Amado"	Pausini, Cheope	Daniel	León Tristán	04:00
7.	"Tan Importante"	Pausini, Chiodo	Cesare Chiodo	Badia	03:29
8.	"Háblame"	Pausini, Cheope	Daniel	Tristán	03:44
9.	"Donde El Aire Es Ceniza"	Pausini, Cheope	Antonio Galbiati	Badia	03:48
10.	"Amar Completamente"	Pausini, Chiodo	Chiodo	Badia	04:01
11.	"Me Abandono A Ti"	Madonna, Rick Nowels, Pausini	Madonna, Rick Nowels	Pausini	04:43

=== Limited edition DVD ===
No.	Title	Writer(s)	Length
1.	"Prendo te" (Music video)	Laura Pausini
2.	"Resta in ascolto" (Music video)	Daniel, Pausini, Cheope
3.	"Resta in ascolto" (Making of the video)	—
4.	"Escucha atento" (Music video)	Daniel, Pausini, Cheope, Badia
5.	"Making of the photoshoot"	—
6.	"De tu amor" (Music video)	Kara DioGuardi, Johan Ekhé, Ulf Lindström, Pausini
7.	"On n'oublie jamais rien, on vit avec (Il ricordo che ho di noi)" (Music video in duet with Hélène Ségara)	Bruno Grimaldi, Gérard Capaldi, Antoine Angelelli, Pausini
8.	"EPK (Electronic Press Kit)"	—

== Charts and certifications ==
=== Weekly charts ===
Chart (2004–05)	Peak Position
Belgian Albums (Ultratop Flanders)	69
Belgian Albums (Ultratop Wallonia)	9
Dutch Albums (Album Top 100)	19
European Top 100 Albums (Billboard)	6
Finnish Albums (Suomen virallinen lista)	18
French Albums (SNEP)	7
German Albums (Offizielle Top 100)	84
Italian Albums (FIMI)	1
Mexican Albums (AMPROFON)	11
Spanish Albums (PROMUSICAE)	3
Swedish Albums (Sverigetopplistan)	22
Swiss Albums (Schweizer Hitparade)	2
US Heatseekers Albums (Billboard)	20
US Top Latin Albums (Billboard)	20
US Latin Pop Albums (Billboard)	10

=== Year-end charts ===
Chart (2004)	Position
Belgian Albums (Ultratop Wallonia)	54
French Albums (SNEP)	74
Italian Albums (FIMI)	15
Swiss Albums (Schweizer Hitparade)	24

Chart (2005)	Position
Italian Albums (FIMI)	14
Mexican Albums (AMPROFON)	53
Swiss Albums (Schweizer Hitparade)	13

=== Certifications and sales ===
Region	Certification	Certified units/sales
Belgium (BRMA)	Gold	25,000^{*}
France (SNEP)	Gold	100,000^{*}
Italy (FIMI) sales 2004-2005	4× Platinum	400,000^{*}
Italy (FIMI) sales since 2009	Gold	25,000^{‡}
Mexico (AMPROFON)	Platinum	100,000^{^}
Spain (Promusicae)	Gold	50,000^{^}
Switzerland (IFPI Switzerland)	2× Platinum	80,000^{^}
United States (RIAA)	Platinum (Latin)	100,000^{^}
^{*} Sales figures based on certification alone.^{^} Shipments figures based on certification alone.^{‡} Sales+streaming figures based on certification alone.

== Personnel ==
Credits adapted from AllMusic.

=== Production credits ===
- Giulio Antognini – assistant engineer, mixing assistant
- Emporio Armani – wardrobe
- Antonio Baglio – mastering
- Joe Beckett – project coordinator
- Luca Bignardi – computers, engineer, mixing, programming
- Matteo Bolzoni – assistant engineer, mixing assistant
- Marco Borsatti – engineer
- John Brough – engineer, mixing
- Cesare Chiodo – producer
- Peter Cobbin – string engineer
- Emiliano Fantuzzi – pre-production
- Daniela Federici – photography
- Geoff Foster – string engineer
- Roberta Frau – assistant
- Chris Garcia – engineer
- Gabriele Gigli – assistant engineer, mixing assistant
- Kieron Menzies – engineer
- Rick Nowels – producer
- Cesare Paciotti – wardrobe
- Sergio Pappalettera – artwork
- Gabrielle Parisi – executive producer
- Dado Parisini – producer, programming
- Laura Pausini – producer
- Wayne Rodrigues – computer analysis, programming
- Tara Saremi – project coordinator
- John Temis – engineer, mixing, producer
- Luca Turatti – assistant engineer, mixing assistant
- Celso Valli – producer

=== Music credits ===
- Rusty Anderson – electric guitar
- Biagio Antonacci – composer
- J. Badia – adaptation
- Eric Buffat – composer
- Cheope – composer
- Cesare Chiodo – bass, acoustic guitar, keyboards, piano, composer
- Luis Conte – percussions
- Paolo Costa – bass
- Gaetano Curreri – composer
- Emiliano Fantuzzi – electric guitar
- Gabriele Fersini – electric guitar
- Riccardo Galardini – acoustic guitar
- Antonio Galbiati – composer
- Paolo Gianolio – acoustic guitar
- Alfredo Golino – drums
- Saverio Grandi – composer
- Charles Judge – effects, keyboards, strings
- Madonna – composer
- Rick Nowels – keyboards, Spanish guitar
- Dado Parisini – arranger, brass arrangement, director, keyboards, piano
- Laura Pausini – adaptation, composer, vocals
- Carlos Alberto Perez – percussion
- Roberto Rossi – trombone
- Vasco Rossi – composer
- Marco Tamburini – flugelhorn
- John Themis – arranger, bandir, bass, clay drums, conductor, drum programming, effects, string arrangements
- Ian Thomas – drums
- León Tristán – adaptation
- Celso Valli – arranger, conductor, keyboards, piano, string arrangements
- Michele Vanni – acoustic guitar
- Massimo Varini – acoustic guitar, electric guitar
- Vasko Vassiliev – concert master
- Daniel Vuletic – acoustic guitar, composer
- Geoff Westley – conductor, string arrangements
- Gavyn Wright – concert master
