= Virginio (singer) =

Italian singer-songwriter (born 1985)

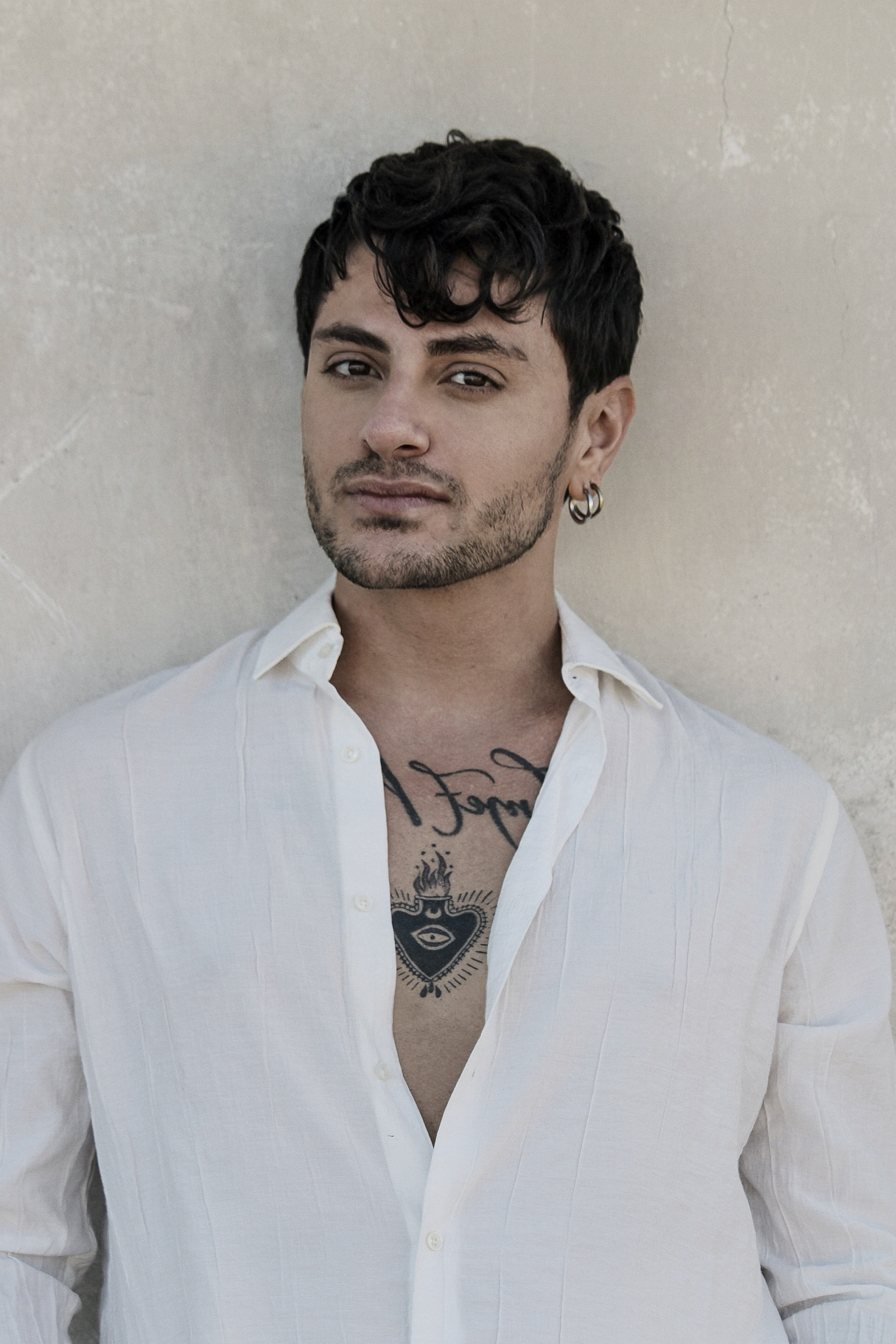
- Virginio in July 2024

Background information
- Born: Virginio Simonelli; 31 January 1985 (age 41); Fondi, Lazio, Italy
- Genre: Pop
- Occupations: Singer; songwriter
- Instruments: Vocals; piano
- Years active: 2005–present
- Labels: Universal (2005-2006, 2011-2014, 2022–present); iMean Music (2015-2019) MP Film (2020–present)
- Website: www.virginiosimonelli.it

Virginio Simonelli (Italian pronunciation: [virˈdʒiːnjo simoˈnɛlli]; born 31 January 1985), known professionally by the mononym Virginio, is an Italian singer-songwriter.

He made his debut in 2006 in the Sanremo Music Festival's New Proposals category with the song Davvero. In 2011 he won the tenth edition of the Italian singing competition Amici di Maria De Filippi in the singers-songwriters category and published his record Finalmente. Between 2012 and 2023 he has released sixteen singles. He has sold more than 30,000 copies of his albums and won a Gold Wind Music Award.

== Biography ==
As a child, Virginio showed a natural predisposition to music. As a teenager, he learned to play the piano, sing, and compose his first songs, also experimenting with dancing and acting. After graduating from the Gobetti High School in his hometown, Fondi, he moved to Milan. There, he enrolled in the Nuova Accademia Delle Belle Arti (New Academy of Fine Arts), where he graduated in Graphic Design And Art Direction, getting in touch with producers Paolo Agosta (his professor) and Ivo Grasso, with whom he began collaborating.

=== First steps in music: Sanremo Nuove Proposte and the first album Virginio ===
In 2006 he took part in the 56th Sanremo Music Festival in the category New Proposals with a song written by him, Davvero that anticipated his first album Virginio, produced by Ivo Grasso and Fabrizio Grenghi. The album contains ten tracks and the lyrics were written by the singer along with Paolo Agosta, who also composed the music. The second single Instabile was released in May and the third one Novembre in October.

In 2010 he made his first experience as an author, writing with Paola & Chiara the tracks Milleluci and Adesso Stop!, of which he also composed the music, contained in their album Milleluci.

=== Winner of Amici di Maria De Filippi and the EP Finalmente ===
In September 2010 Virginio passed the selections of the tenth edition of Amici di Maria De Filippi. During the contest Virginio presented Ad occhi chiusi, Non ha importanza and Dolcenotte and won the competition in March 2011.

On March 8, 2011, he published his second studio album Finalmente promoted by the singles Ad occhi chiusi and Sale. The album sold over 30,000 copies and it was certified gold and therefore awarded at the Wind Music Awards.

=== "Ovunque" and second experience in Amici ===
On 26 March 2012, Virginio published his third album "Ovunque", featuring the singles Alice and La Dipendenza and a song, Catch Me, that Gary Barlow, leader of Take That, gave to Virginio, who translated it into Italian with the title Tu Mi Senti.

From March 31, 2012, Virginio attended the eleventh edition of Amici in a special contest, called Big, where former contestants of previous editions of the show challenged each other, but Virginio was eliminated during the 3rd episode.

In 2013 he composed and wrote for and with Laura Pausini the songs Limpido, in duet with Kylie Minogue, and Dove resto solo io.

=== 2015-2019 ===
In 2015 he was the opening act for one of the shows of Malika Ayane's Naïf tour and released the single Hercules, produced in San Francisco by Corrado Rustici and written with Andy Marvel, Dimitri Ehrlich and Jesse Harris. In the same year he was one of the authors of the lyrics to Raf's Rimani tu. In 2016, together with Andrea Ferrara, he wrote and composed the m music for Weird by Lorenzo Fragola.

In 2016, Virginio participated with a cover of Royals by Lorde to the compilation A.M.I. - Rarities of Artists for Amatrice was released. In 2017 he co-authored lyrics and music for Chiara Galiazzo's song Chiaroscuro.

In July 2017 he participated to the festival Symphonic Night Vol 2 Napoli Fantasy at Shibuya O-EAST in Tokyo, as the guest vocalist of Corrado Rustici's prog-rock band Cervello, an event from which a live CD and DVD entitled Live in Tokyo 2017 was released. In September 2018 she is part of the cast, at the Teatro Nuovo in Milan, of the musical event Buon compleanno Mimì, organized by the cultural association Minuetto in memory of Mia Martini, paying tribute to the artist with a cover of Il fiume dei profumi, a song written for her by Biagio Antonacci. In 2017 he released the single Semplifica, produced by Gianluigi Fazio and written in collaboration with Fazio himself and Edwyn Roberts, which was promoted live by Virginio during the 2018's edition of the Italian event Festival Show.

In 2018 he collaborated again with Laura Pausini with whom he co-authored the lyrics of Fantastico (Fai quello che sei), E.sta.a.te and Il caso è chiuso, he was then an opening act of five of Pausini's Fatti sentire World Wide Tour 2018 shows. In November 2018, he performed in Osaka at the "Italia, amore mio!" festival, an event organized by the Italian Chamber of Commerce that promotes made in Italy music, art, food and wine in Japan. In the same year, he released the single Rischiamo tutto and in 2019 Cubalibre, whose video inspired by Bernardo Bertolucci's The Dreamers, directed by Alessandro Congiu, was awarded as Video revelation of the year at the Premio Roma Videoclip 2019.

With a conference at the Chamber of Deputies in June 2016, it was announced that Virginio would collaborate on Parole liberate: beyond the prison wall, a poetry contest, conceived by Duccio Parodi and Michele De Lucia, reserved for people in prison. The winning poem, P.S. post scriptum, by then inmate Giuseppe Catalano, in fact, was set to music by Virginio and recorded and published in 2019. P.S. post scriptum was awarded Best Lyrics at the International Short Film Festival Tulipani di Seta Nera.

Between 2018 and 2019 he collaborated with Officine Buone, a non-profit organization that brings live music to hospitals, also participating in the MTV series Involontaria inspired by the project. On September 2, 2019, Virginio announced, during the 76th edition of the Venice International Film Festival, that he is the artist who won the SIAE's Per chi crea contest for the national and international promotion of Italian music, winning the production of a tour in the United States, planned for spring 2020 but currently postponed due to the 2019-2021 COVID-19 pandemic.

=== 2020-today ===
In 2020, he participated in Tale e quale show (the Italian version of Sing Your Face Off) and took on the role of music artistic director of MP FILM, a film-music production company. In the same year he also signed the sound direction of Donne - Storie che ispirano, a docu-series about women with breast cancer by Italian TV channel LA7d, and of Manteniamoci Informate, an ovarian cancer awareness campaign. He also supported his hometown, Fondi, which became a "red zone" during the 2020 COVID-19 Pandemic in Italy with a charitable concert, Artisti ProFondi, streamed on April 2, 2020, featuring Marco Masini, Arisa, Noemi and other colleagues

In 2021 he released the singles Rimani (also presented in Latin America in its Spanish-language version Mañana in 2022) and Brava gente. Also in 2021 he co-wrote Ti vedo da fuori by Alessandra Amoroso, featured on the album Tutto accade.

Between February and April 2022 he co-wrote the song Quello che abbiamo perso by Giusy Ferreri, featured on the album Cortometraggi and he sang in duet with Bianca Atzei on Collisioni. In the summer he released the single M'incanta for Universal Music Italy[ and wrote with Daniele Coro Il panda con le ali, a song that participated in the 65th edition of the Zecchino d'Oro and was the winner of the event.

In September 2022, he announced, during the 79th edition of the Venice International Film Festival, his new single Non dirlo a nessuno, and its Spanish version No le digas a nadie, the main song of the soundtrack of Alessio Russo's film of the same name, in which Virginio also takes part with a cameo.[59][60][61] On December 11, 2022, he participated in and won the second edition of the Christmas version of the Italian TV program Tale e quale show with his performance as George Michael, singing Last Christmas.

In winter 2023 he collaborated in the creation of the song Un milione di piccole tempeste performed by Gianni Morandi. On May 25, 2023, he released his new single Il giorno con la notte in Italian and El día con la noche in Spanish, featuring Teo Bok and with the production of Julio Reyes Copello. In June 2023 he worked again with Laura Pausini, writing for her Il primo passo sulla Luna and Vale la pena for her new album Anime Parallele.

In January 2024 he wrote for and with Alberto Urso Mille domande. In February he participated in Tale e quale Sanremo. On March 16 and on March 30, he was the opening act for the tour dates in Mexico City and Miami of Laura Pausini's World Tour 2023–2024. During an interview on Telemundo's talk show Conectados con Daisy he announced his new single Noche Negra which was released on June 4. In September 2024 he cowrote the music for the song Disobbedire by Fiorella Mannoia and he released his new single Amarene. On November 7, 8, and 9, he was the opening act for the dates in Houston, Miami, and Orlando of Carlos Baute's De mi puño y letra tour.

== Private life ==
On May 24, 2023, he came out as gay in an interview with Vanity Fair Italy.

== Discography ==
=== Studio albums ===
- 2006 – Virginio (March 3, 2006)
- 2011 – Finalmente (March 8, 2011) (ITA #4; Gold – 30,000+ copies)
- 2012 – Ovunque (March 26, 2012) (ITA #12)

=== Compilation ===
- 2011 – Amici 10 (with other contestants of Amici)

=== Singles ===
- 2006 – Davvero
- 2006 – Instabile
- 2006 – Novembre
- 2011 – Ad occhi chiusi
- 2011 – Sale
- 2012 – Alice (Elis)
- 2012 – La Dipendenza
- 2015 – Hercules
- 2018 – Semplifica
- 2018 – Rischiamo tutto
- 2019 – Cubalibre
- 2019 – P.S. post scriptum
- 2021 – Rimani
- 2021 – Brava gente
- 2022 – Collisioni feat. Bianca Atzei
- 2022 – Mañana
- 2022 – M'incanta
- 2022 – Non dirlo a nessuno
- 2023 – El día con la noche feat. Teo Bok
- 2024 – Noche negra
- 2024 – Amarene

=== Videos ===
- 2006 – Davvero
- 2006 – Instabile
- 2011 – Ad occhi chiusi
- 2011 – Sale
- 2012 – Alice (Elis)
- 2012 – La Dipendenza
- 2015 – Hercules
- 2018 – Semplifica
- 2018 – Rischiamo tutto
- 2019 – Cubalibre
- 2019 – P.S. post scriptum
- 2021 – Rimani
- 2021 – Brava gente
- 2022 – Collisioni feat. Bianca Atzei
- 2022 – Mañana
- 2022 – M'incanta
- 2022 – Non dirlo a nessuno
- 2023 – Il giorno con la notte
- 2023 – El día con la noche
- 2024 – Noche negra; Notte Nera
- 2024 – Amarene

== Tours ==
- 2011
  - Finalmente Tour
- 2012
  - Ovunque Tour
- 2017
  - Acoustic Live Tour
- 2024
  - Virginio 2024

=== Other tours ===
- 2011
  - Nokia Amici in Tour
  - Sete di Radio Tour
  - Radio Bruno estate tour
  - Radionorba Battiti Live
  - Company Contatto

=== Author and composer for other singers ===
Year	Title	Artist	Album
2010	Milleluci (Lyrics: Chiara Iezzi, Paola Iezzi, Virginio Simonelli - Music: Virginio Simonelli)	Paola & Chiara	Milleluci
2010	Adesso stop! (Lyrics: Chiara Iezzi, Paola Iezzi - Music: Virginio Simonelli)	Paola & Chiara	Milleluci
2012	Riflessi di me (Lyrics: Francesca Michielin, Virginio Simonelli - Music: Elisa Toffoli)	Francesca Michielin	Riflessi di me
2013	Limpido (Lyrics: Laura Pausini, Virginio Simonelli - Music: Virginio Simonelli)	Laura Pausini feat. Kylie Minogue	20 – The Greatest Hits
2013	Dove resto solo io (Lyrics: Laura Pausini, Virginio Simonelli - Music: Virginio Simonelli)	Laura Pausini	20 – The Greatest Hits
2014	Qualcosa resta sempre (Lyrics: Virginio Simonelli - Music: Chris Loco, Natalia Hajjara e Philippe Marc Anquetil)	Chiara	Un giorno di sole
2015	Rimani tu (Lyrics and music: Chiara Civello, Alessandra Flora, Raffaele Riefoli, Virginio Simonelli and Luca Vicini)	Raf	Sono io
2015	Como yo sabría (Lyrics and music: Laura Pausini and Virginio Simonelli)	Maverick López Sánchez	18+1
2016	Weird (Lyrics and music: Andrea Ferrara, Virginio Simonelli)	Lorenzo Fragola	Zero Gravity
2017	Chiaroscuro (Lyrics: Chiara Galiazzo, Virginio Simonelli - Music: Gianluigi Fazio, Virginio Simonelli)	Chiara	Nessun posto è casa mia
2018	Fantastico (fai quello che sei) (Lyrics: Laura Pausini, Virginio Simonelli - Music: Laura Pausini, Paolo Carta)	Laura Pausini	Fatti sentire
2018	Il caso è chiuso (Lyrics: Laura Pausini, Virginio Simonelli - Music: Daniel Vuletic)	Laura Pausini	Fatti sentire
2018	E.sta.a.te (Lyrics: Laura Pausini, Virginio Simonelli - Music: Paolo Carta)	Laura Pausini	Fatti sentire
2018	Tra le mani (Lyrics and music: Andrea Bonomo and Virginio Simonelli)	Carmen Ferreri	La complicità
2019	Punto a capo (Lyrics and music: Virginio Simonelli)	Carmen Ferreri	Più forti del ricordo
2019	Magnifico donare (Lyrics and music: Virginio Simonelli) Promotional song for AVIS, Italian charitable organisation for blood donation	Chiara	—
2020	Ognuno per sé (Lyrics and music: Virginio Simonelli)	Francesco Bertoli	Carpe Diem
2021	Ti vedo da fuori (Lyrics and music: Federica Camba, Daniele Coro, Virginio Simonelli)	Alessandra Amoroso	Tutto accade
2022	Quello che abbiamo perso (Lyrics and music: Diego Mancino, Daniele Coro, Virginio Simonelli)	Giusy Ferreri	Cortometraggi
2023	Un milione di piccole tempeste (Lyrics and music: Diego Mancino, Daniele Coro, Federica Camba, Virginio Simonelli)	Gianni Morandi	Evviva!
2023	Il primo passo sulla Luna (Lyrics: Virginio Simonelli, Cheope, Laura Pausini - Music: Virginio Simonelli, Jason Rooney)	Laura Pausini	Anime Parallele
2023	Vale la pena (Lyrics and music: Virginio Simonelli, Daniele Coro, Denise Faro, Diego Mancino, Laura Pausini)	Laura Pausini	Anime Parallele
2024	Mille domande (Lyrics and music: Virginio Simonelli, Alberto Urso, Daniele Coro, Fabio Arduini)	Alberto Urso	
2024	Disobbedire (Lyrics: Fiorella Mannoia, Cheope - Music: Marco Colavecchio, Virginio Simonelli, Carlo Di Francesco)	Fiorella Mannoia	—

== Awards and nominations ==
- 2011 – Winner of the singer category of Amici di Maria De Filippi
- 2011 – Gold Wind Music Award for Finalmente
- 2018 – Premio internazionale Palinuro (International Award of Palinuro)
- 2018 – Riconoscimento Giovanni Paolo II (Recognition Pope John Paul II)
- 2019 – Premio (Award) Roma Videoclip for Cubalibre
- 2020 – Premio #SocialClip for P.S. post scriptum at Tulipani di Seta Nera 2020
- 2022 – Premio speciale al Fara film festival (Fara Film Festival Special Award) 2022
- 2022 – Premio persona dell'anno 2022 di Fondi (Person of the year 2022 of the city of Fondi)
- 2022 – Zecchino d'oro as an author of Il panda con le ali
- 2023 – Premio (Award) Roma Videoclip for International Video for El día con la noche
