= Io canto 2 =

Io canto 2/Yo canto 2
- Italian-language edition

Studio album by Laura Pausini
- Released: February 6, 2026 (Italian-language); March 13, 2026 (Spanish-language)
- Genre: Pop
- Languages: Italian; Spanish; Portuguese; French; German; English
- Label: Warner
- Producers: Paolo Carta; Michelangelo; Simon Says!; Katoo

Laura Pausini chronology
Anime parallele/Almas paralelas (2023)	Io canto 2/Yo canto 2 (2026)

Singles from Io canto 2/Yo canto 2
- 1. "La mia storia tra le dita / Mi historia entre tus dedos / Quem de nós dois / Mon histoire entre les doigts" Released: September 12, 2025; 2. "Eso y más" Released: November 14, 2025; 3. "Ritorno ad amare" Released: December 5, 2025; 4. "La dernière chanson (Due vite)" Released: January 16, 2026; 5. "16 marzo" Released: February 6, 2026; 6. "Mariposa Tecknicolor" Released: February 19, 2026; 7. "Immensamente" Released: April 24, 2026

Io canto 2 and Yo canto 2 (English: I sing 2) are the sixteenth studio albums by Italian singer Laura Pausini. The Italian-language edition was released on February 6, 2026, while the Spanish-language edition was released on March 13, 2026, by Warner Music. It was recognised at the 27th Annual Latin Grammy Awards for Best Traditional Pop Album.

== Background ==
In September 2025, Pausini publicly announced that she was working on a new cover album, twenty years after the 2006 studio album Io canto, with which she won the Latin Grammy Award for Best Female Pop Vocal Album with the Spanish version.

On October 21, 2025, Pausini revealed the cover of the new albums on her social media profiles, both of which feature the same font used for the first cover album, Io canto. On December 16, 2025, she announced the release date of Io canto 2, released February 6, 2026, and Yo canto 2 scheduled for March 13, 2026, making known the tracklist and the available versions. On January 22, 2026, the duets of the tracklist in Italian were announced, followed by the duets of the tracklist in Spanish on February 10, 2026.

== Promotion ==
The first single from the project was La mia storia tra le dita, released simultaneously in all the languages in which it was recorded: Italian, Spanish (Mi historia entre tus dedos), Portuguese (Quem de nós dois) and, for the first time, French (Mon histoire entre les doigts). Subsequently, in Italy, Ritorno ad amare by Biagio Antonacci was released as the second single and 16 marzo as the third in duet with Achille Lauro.

La dernière chanson (Due vite) with Julien Lieb was also released as a single in France, followed by Eso y más with Yami Safdie in Spain and Latin America.

To promote the album, Pausini announced the Io canto World Tour 2026-2027, which will start in March 2026 and will include 54 dates in Europe, the United States and Latin America.

== Track listing ==
=== Io canto 2 ===
No.	Title	Lyrics	Music	Length
1.	"Ritorno ad amare"	Biagio Antonacci	Antonacci	4:09
2.	"Quanno chiove"	Pino Daniele	Daniele	3:05
3.	"Quem de nós dois"	Gianluca Grignani	Grignani	5:15
4.	"Dettagli"	Bruno Lauzi	Roberto Carlos, Erasmo Carlos	4:03
5.	"Immensamente"	Umberto Tozzi	Tozzi	3:27
6.	"16 marzo" (Duet with Achille Lauro)	Achille Lauro	Lauro	3:42
7.	"Hai scelto me"	Zucchero Fornaciari	Fornaciari	2:30
8.	"La Isla Bonita"	Madonna, Patrick Leonard, Bruce Gaitsch	Madonna, Leonard, Gaitsch	3:32
9.	"E poi"	Giorgia	Marco Rinalduzzi, Massimo Calabrese	4:29
10.	"Felicità" (Duet with Lucio Dalla)	Lucio Dalla	Dalla	5:03
11.	"Já sei namorar"	Arnaldo Antunes, Carlinhos Brown, Marisa Monte	Tribalistas	3:32
12.	"Ma che freddo fa" (Duet with Annalisa)	Franco Migliacci	Claudio Mattone	2:46
13.	"Un senso"	Vasco Rossi, Saverio Grandi	Rossi, Grandi, Gaetano Curreri	3:41
14.	"Non sono una signora"	Ivano Fossati	Fossati	3:41
15.	"Ci vorrebbe il mare"	Marco Masini, Gianna Albini	Giancarlo Bigazzi	3:48
16.	"La dernière chanson (Due vite)" (Duet with Julien Lieb)	Marco Mengoni	Davide Petrella, Davide Simonetta	3:44
17.	"Wenn du an wunder glaubst"	Gino Paoli	Paoli	1:41

Deluxe edition bonus tracks
No.	Title	Lyrics	Music	Length
18.	"Fratello sole sorella luna"	Riz Ortolani	Jean-Marie Benjamin	2:44
19.	"O céu dentro de um quarto"	Paoli	Paoli	1:41
20.	"Il cielo in una stanza"	Paoli	Paoli	1:41
21.	"This World We Love In"	Paoli	Paoli	1:41

Digital deluxe edition bonus tracks
No.	Title	Lyrics	Music	Length
22.	"Quem de nós dois" (solo version)	Grignani	Grignani	5:15
23.	"Mon histoire entre les doigts"	Grignani	Grignani	5:15
24.	"La mia storia tra le dita"	Grignani	Grignani	5:15

=== Yo canto 2 ===
No.	Title	Writer(s)	Length
1.	"Oye Mi Canto" (Duet with Richaelio)	Gloria Estefan, Jorge Casas, Clay Ostwald	3:28
2.	"Hijo de la Luna"	José Maria Cano	4:09
3.	"Mi historia entre tus dedos"	Gianluca Grignani	5:15
4.	"Hasta la Raíz"	Natalia Lafourcade, Leonel García	3:13
5.	"Bachata Rosa"	Juan Luis Guerra	4:07
6.	"Gracias a la vida" (Duet with Nahuel Pennisi)	Violeta Parra	2:40
7.	"Mariposa Tecknicolor"	Fito Páez	3:00
8.	"Pausa" (featuring Mikel Izal)	Izal	2:45
9.	"Antología"	Shakira, Luis Fernando Ochoa	3:39
10.	"¿Porqué te vas?"	José Luis Perales	3:02
11.	"Cuando nadie me ve"	Alejandro Sanz	5:12
12.	"Eso y Más" (Duet with Yami Safdie)	Joan Sebastian	2:27
13.	"Hoy"	Gian Marco Zignago	3:04
14.	"El talisman"	Rosana Arbelo	3:41
15.	"Turista"	Benito Martínez, Marco Borrero, Roberto Rosado, Jonathan Asperil, Scott Dittrich	2:46
16.	"Livin' la Vida Loca" (Spanglish version)	Draco Rosa, Desmond Child	3:56
17.	"Cuando Nacen Amores" (Duet with Ricardo Montaner)	Montaner	3:58
18.	"El patio"	Pablo López	4:24

Deluxe edition bonus tracks
No.	Title	Writer(s)	Length
19.	"No Soy Una Señora"	Fossati, Peter Daniels	3:41
20.	"Entre sobras y sobras me faltas"	Antonio Orozco	4:01
21.	"Cuando Nacen Amores" (solo version)	Montaner	3:58

== Charts ==
Chart performance for Io canto 2
Chart (2026)	Peak position
Belgian Albums (Ultratop Wallonia)	4
Belgian Albums (Ultratop Flanders)	179
French Albums (SNEP)	105
Italian Albums (FIMI)	3
Spanish Albums (PROMUSICAE)	90
Swiss Albums (Schweizer Hitparade)	7

Chart performance for Yo canto 2
Chart (2026)	Peak position
Italian Albums (FIMI)	29
Spanish Albums (PROMUSICAE)	5
