= Primavera in anticipo (It Is My Song) =

Single by Laura Pausini featuring James Blunt

from the album Primavera in anticipo
- B-side: "Primavera Anticipada (It Is My Song)"
- Released: 2 January 2009
- Genre: Pop
- Length: 3:28
- Label: Atlantic
- Songwriters: Laura Pausini, Cheope, Daniel Vuletic, James Blunt

Laura Pausini singles chronology
"Invece no" (2008)	"Primavera in anticipo" (2009)	"Un fatto ovvio" (2009)

James Blunt singles chronology
"Love, Love, Love" (2008)	"It Is My Song" (2009)	"Stay The Night" (2010)

"Primavera in anticipo (It Is My Song)" (English: "Anticipated Spring") is a pop duet between Italian singer Laura Pausini and British singer-songwriter James Blunt. It was released as the second single from Pausini's album Primavera in anticipo. The single was released on 2 January 2009. The song was also featured on the deluxe version of Blunt's second studio album, All the Lost Souls. The single was very successful in Europe, however, was not released in the UK or Ireland. The single was released simultaneously digitally and physically.

== Release ==
The single was released on one digital and physical format, both containing the same track listing. The song was backed with a Spanish version, "Primavera Anticipada (It Is My Song)".

== Music video ==
A music video was released in many European territories. The video features Blunt and Pausini together in an Italian mansion, however, both are locked in separate, empty rooms with only their instruments to keep them company. As the song progresses, Blunt starts a fire in his room which spreads to the main hall of the building, leading to him having to rescue Pausini. The video was included on the deluxe edition bonus DVD of Blunt's All the Lost Souls.

== Live performances ==
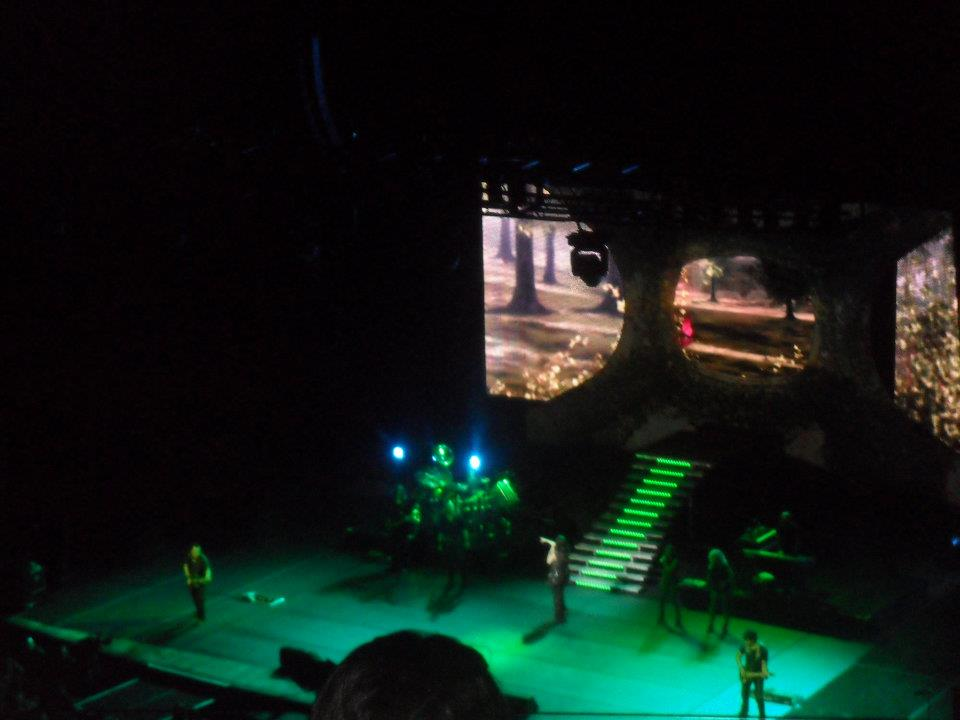
Laura Pausini performing "Primavera in anticipo" as part of her Inedito World Tour in São Paulo in January 2012

"Primavera in anticipo" was chosen by Pausini to close all her World Tour 2009 concerts. The performance of the song in Monza was recorded and released in the Laura Live World Tour 09 live album. On 21 June 2009, as part of the "Amiche per l'Abruzzo" beneficent concert, Pausini shared the vocals of the song with Giorgia Todrani.

The song is also present on Pausini's Inedito World Tour. During such performances, images of a forest during the spring are shown in the videowall.

== Usage ==
"Primavera in anticipo (It Is My Song)" was included as a solo live version on the album Laura Live World Tour 09 (audio and video) and its Spanish-language version Laura Live Gira Mundial 09 (video) in 2009, whilst "Primavera anticipada (It Is My Song)" was included on the audio disc of the latter.

"Primavera in anticipo (It Is My Song)" as a duet, was included in the special edition of James Blunt's All the Lost Souls.

== Track listing ==
CDS - Promo Warner Music Europe

1. "Primavera in anticipo (It Is My Song)" (with James Blunt)

CDS - Promo Warner Music Mexico

1. "Primavera anticipada (It Is My Song)" (with James Blunt)

CDS - 5051865353522 Warner Music Italy

1. "Primavera in anticipo (It Is My Song)" (with James Blunt)
2. "Primavera in anticipo"
3. "Invece no"

CDS - Warner Music Mexico

1. "Primavera anticipada (It Is My Song)" (with James Blunt)
2. "Primavera in anticipo (It Is My Song)" (with James Blunt)
3. "Primavera anticipada"

Digital download

1. "Primavera in anticipo (It Is My Song)" (with James Blunt)
2. "Primavera in anticipo"
3. "Primavera anticipada (It Is My Song)" (with James Blunt)
4. "Primavera anticipada"

== Charts ==
=== Weekly charts ===
Chart (2009)	Peak position
Austria (Ö3 Austria Top 40)	1
Belgium (Ultratip Bubbling Under Flanders)	9
Belgium (Ultratop 50 Wallonia)	23
European Hot 100	66
Germany (GfK)	16
Italy (FIMI)	5
Italy Airplay (Music Control)	2
Spain (Promusicae)	21
Switzerland (Schweizer Hitparade)	5
Switzerland Airplay (Schweizer Hitparade)	2

=== Year-end charts ===
Chart (2009)	Position
Austria (Ö3 Austria Top 75)	9
Germany (Official German Charts)	63
Italy (FIMI)	60
Switzerland (Schweizer Hitparade)	26

=== Certifications ===
Region	Certification	Certified units/sales
Austria (IFPI Austria)	Gold	15,000^{*}
Switzerland (IFPI Switzerland)	Gold	15,000^{^}
^{*} Sales figures based on certification alone.^{^} Shipments figures based on certification alone.
