= Invece no =

Single by Laura Pausini

from the album Primavera in anticipo
- B-side: "En cambio no" (Spanish version)
- Released: October 22, 2008
- Genre: Pop
- Length: 3:58
- Label: Atlantic
- Songwriters: Laura Pausini; Niccolò Agliardi
- Producers: Laura Pausini; Paolo Carta

Laura Pausini singles chronology
"Destinazione paradiso" (2007)	"Invece no" (2008)	"Primavera in anticipo (It Is My Song)" (2009)

"Invece no" ("Actually, no!") is a pop song by Italian singer Laura Pausini, released on October 22, 2008, which she wrote with Niccolò Agliardi and produced with Paolo Carta for her album Primavera in anticipo. Its Spanish version "En cambio no", featured in the Mexican telenovela En Nombre del Amor (2008), was nominated for the 2009 Latin Grammy for Record of the Year. The song also has a Portuguese version named "Agora não" ("Not now"), but it was released only in Italy.

== Lyrics ==
Inspired by the death of her grandmother, the lyrics are about a longing for a person, focusing on unsaid things and old memories.

== Music video ==
The music video was filmed in Santa Monica and in West Hills, California in August 2008. Directed by Alessandro D'Alatri and starring former contestant on Survivor: Cook Island Ozzy Lusth and fashion model Krystal Davidsohn, the video shows how difficult it is for a soldier to return to everyday life. It was released on the web on October 22, 2008.

== Formats and track listings ==
CDS - Invece no

1. "Invece no"

CDS - En cambio no

1. "En cambio no" (Spanish version)

CDS - Primavera in anticipo (It Is My Song)

1. "Primavera in anticipo (It Is My Song)" (duet with James Blunt)
2. "Primavera in anticipo"
3. "Invece no"

Digital download

1. "Invece no"
2. "En cambio no"
3. "Agora não" (Portuguese version)

== Charts ==
"Invece no"
Chart (2008–09)	Peak position
Europe (European Hot 100 Singles)	96
Italy (FIMI)	2
Switzerland (Schweizer Hitparade)	52

"En cambio no"
Chart (2009)	Peak position
Guatemala (EFE)	8
Honduras (EFE)	2
Mexico (Billboard Espanol Airplay)	1
Panama (EFE)	2
Spain (Promusicae)	47
US Hot Latin Songs (Billboard)	28
US Latin Pop Airplay (Billboard)	9
