= Anime Parallele =

Anime parallele/Almas paralelas
- Italian-language edition

Studio album by Laura Pausini
- Released: October 27, 2023
- Recorded: 2020–2023
- Genre: Pop
- Length: 52:57
- Language: Italian; Spanish; Portuguese
- Label: Atlantic; Warner
- Producer: Katoo; Julio Reyes Copello; Michelangelo; Paolo Carta; Placido Salamone; Simon Says!

Laura Pausini chronology
Fatti sentire/Hazte sentir (2018)	Anime parallele/Almas paralelas (2023)	Io canto 2/Yo canto 2 (2026)

Singles from Anime parallele/Almas paralelas
- 1. "Un buon inizio" Released: March 10, 2023; 2. "Il primo passo sulla luna" Released: June 16, 2023; 3. "Durare" Released: September 15, 2023; 4. "Zero" Released: November 10, 2023

Anime parallele and Almas paralelas (English: Parallel Souls) is the fifteenth double studio album by Italian singer Laura Pausini, released on October 27, 2023 by Warner Music and Atlantic Records. The album is primarily in Italian and Spanish, but it also contains parts in Portuguese. The Spanish version of the album was nominated at the 25th Annual Latin Grammy Awards for Best Traditional Pop Vocal Album.

== Background ==
After releasing her fourteenth studio album Fatti sentire in 2018, Pausini embarked on the Fatti Sentire World Tour 2018 between Europe, the United States and Latin America. In 2019 she released the greatest hits The Singles Collection and set out on the 2019 Laura Biagio Stadi Tour in Italy with Biagio Antonacci. After the conclusion of the tour, the singer announced a recording pause of at least two years.

On October 23, 2020, she publishes the first original song "Io sì (Seen)", a soundtrack to the film The Life Ahead directed by Edoardo Ponti, becoming the first non-English-language song to win the Golden Globe Award for Best Original Song and become the first song written in Italian to be nominated at the Academy Award for Best Original Song. Between 2020 and 2022 Pausini had started recording and composing her fourteenth studio album. In 2022, she published the Italian and Spanish language song "Scatola / Caja", as the soundtrack to the documentary film about the singer life and career Laura Pausini – Piacere di conoscerti directed by Ivan Cotroneo and Monica Rametta for Prime Video.

In August 2023 Pausini announced through her social networks that she had finished her fourteenth studio album, writing, "Today, after 3 years, I can say that I have finally finished singing my new record."

== Conception ==
During a press conference for the album, Pausini said the project was started during the COVID-19 pandemic, and features in the lyrics "stories I have lived or been told" and "to put love, respect for people and human beings back at the center." The singer further stated:

The pandemic forced us to listen to our own thoughts and questions, until we came back to life, without being who we were before, we all became 'parallel souls,' homogenized out of fear of being excluded, even more distant from each other, with fewer points of reference and meeting. I asked myself how I wanted to survive this new reality by coping with it. I haven't found all the answers but I keep looking for them. And in this process I realized that the only way was to start looking at ourselves from the outside, as if my eyes were above me. I put individuality and its right to be respected at the center. And thus was born the thread that binds the tracks on my album

== Composition ==
The project is composed of sixteen tracks in the original version and twenty-two in the deluxe version, written and composed by Pausini with numerous songwriters and composers, including Biagio Antonacci, Federica Abbate, Michele Bravi, Alessandro Raina, Davide Simonetta, Dario Faini, Virginio and Cheope. Production was entrusted to Michelangelo, Paolo Carta, Simon Says! and Francesco "Katoo" Cattiti. The singer reported on the production process of the tracks of the work of joining the arrangements to the artist's voice:

On this record in particular I use falsettos a lot more, which has always cost me trouble to use, because I have a very strong natural voice. At this moment in history, the powerful voice does not work very much, and for me to sing with half-voice is so easy that I feel useless. On the other hand, it was not easy to manage my voice with the new arrangements: I myself called in young, new producers to make sure that my melodies, which I didn't want to abandon, married authentically with the contemporary arrangements that these young producers brought to the record. Sometimes I completely covered the drums with the volume of the vocals, so we had to find a musical square

The singer also explained the decision to include the voice of her daughter Paola in the track "Dimora naturale":

Paola came into my studio at night and heard the song dedicated to her. She asked to sing it with me. She took my hand and knew the melody right away. She also added answers, I played it to Jacopo Pesce and we decided to put it in like that. I'm worried about her being a singer, but in this case I couldn't avoid making the truth in our love felt

== Reception ==
Alessandro Alicandri of TV Sorrisi e Canzoni described the project as "intense and varied in content," noting that it evinces "the desire to leave nothing to chance, to always remember how important attention to detail and renewal is," and "the love of the community of parallel souls who walk alongside her even though they live in different lives." The journalist was impressed by the writers and producers involved in the project, reporting that the production of the songs "comes across as very compact, clear, and very true to Laura Pausini's identity."

Paolo Panzeri of Rockol affirmed that the album presents "an unquestionable formal perfection" that "confirm[s] her status as the queen of Italian pop and that of a Latin music star," appreciating the collaborations in songwriting. Panzeri stressed that the singer "restrains the power of her voice" in the songs, "going rather for more restrained singing, and that is not a bad thing."

Billboard reanked the album as one of the "25 Best Latin Albums of 2023", describing it as a "passionate journey" and a "a pop gem that made us dance and laugh, reflect, and heal" with sounds from "energetic pop-dance/electronic song" to "sensitive piano love ballad".

== Track listing ==
=== Anime parallele ===
Anime parallele – Standard track listing
No.	Title	Lyrics	Music	Producer(s)	Length
1.	"Zero"	Alessandro La Cava; Alfredo Rapetti; Federica Abbate; Francesco Catitti	Catitti	Simon Says!	3:21
2.	"Un buon inizio"	Laura Pausini; Riccardo Zanotti	Zanotti; Giorgio Pesenti; Marco Paganelli	Paolo Carta; Simon Says!	3:10
3.	"Durare"	Pausini; Edwyn Roberts; Paolo Antonacci	Roberts; Antonacci	Carta; Michelangelo	3:19
4.	"Eppure non è così"	Pausini; Jacopo Ettorre	Carta	Carta	3:39
5.	"Cos'è"	Federico Bertollini; La Cava	La Cava	Michelangelo	3:20
6.	"Tutte le volte"	Tommaso Paradiso; Dario Faini	Faini	Katoo	3:29
7.	"Il primo passo sulla luna"	Pausini; Virginio Simonelli; Rapetti	Giuseppe D'Albenzio; Simonelli	Simon Says!	2:58
8.	"Dimora naturale"	Pausini; Michele Bravi; Abbate; Rapetti	Catitti	Katoo	3:33
9.	"Più che un'idea"	Biagio Antonacci	Antonacci; Placido Salamone	Carta; Salamone	3:27
10.	"Anime parallele"	Pausini; Rapetti	Danijel Vuletić	Katoo	3:05
11.	"Però"	Pausini; Roberts; Stefano Marletta	Roberts; Marletta	Michelangelo	3:33
12.	"Flashback"	Pausini; Ettore	Carta	Carta	3:08
13.	"Venere"	Pausini; Alessandro Raina; Davide Simonetta; Raffaele Esposito	Simonetta; Esposito	Simon Says!	3:31
14.	"Vale la pena"	Pausini; Daniele Coro; Denise Faro; Diego Mancino; Simonelli	Coro; Faro; Mancino; Simonelli	Julio Reyes Copello	2:59
15.	"Oltre la superficie"	Rapetti	Vuletić	Katoo	3:19
16.	"Davanti a noi"	Pausini; Niccolò Agliardi	Carta	Carta	2:59
Total length:					52:57

Anime parallele – Brazilian edition bonus track
No.	Title	Lyrics	Music	Producer(s)	Length
3.	"Durar (Uma vida com você)" (featuring Tiago Iorc)	Pausini; Roberts; Antonacci; Tiago Iorczeski	Roberts; Antonacci	Carta; Michelangelo	3:19
Total length:					52:57

Anime parallele – 2024 digital reissue bonus tracks
No.	Title	Lyrics	Music	Producer(s)	Length
1.	"Ciao"	Pausini; Samuel Frederick Smith; Antonio Di Martino; Anna Daprelà; Fraser T. Smith	Pausini; Smith; Di Martino; Daprelà; T. Smith; Carta	Carta	3:32
2.	"Ti porterai lontano"	Claudia Lagona	Lagona; Andrea Mariano	Mariano	3:10
8.	"Nemica ^{[a]}"	Ettorre	Carta	Carta	3:02
9.	"All’amore nostro ^{[a]}"	Antonio Aiello	Aiello; Carta	Carta	2:00

=== Almas paralelas ===
Almas paralelas – Standard track listing
No.	Title	Lyrics	Music	Producer(s)	Length
1.	"Cero"	La Cava; Abbate; Rapetti; Catitti	Catitti	Simon Says!	3:21
2.	"Un buen inicio"	Pausini; Zanotti	Zanotti; Pesenti; Paganelli	Carta; Simon Says!	3:10
3.	"Durar"	Pausini; Roberts; Antonacci	Roberts; Antonacci	Carta; Michelangelo	3:19
4.	"Perdona si no es así"	Pausini; Ettorre	Carta	Carta	3:39
5.	"Qué es"	Bertollini; La Cava	La Cava	Michelangelo	3:20
6.	"Todas las veces"	Paradiso; Faini	Faini	Katoo	3:29
7.	"El primer paso en la luna"	Pausini; Simonelli; Rapetti	D'Albenzio; Simonelli	Simon Says!	2:58
8.	"Hogar natural"	Pausini; Bravi; Abbate; Rapetti	Catitti	Katoo	3:33
9.	"Más que una idea"	Antonacci	Antonacci; Salamone	Carta; Salamone	3:27
10.	"Almas paralelas"	Pausini; Rapetti	Vuletić	Katoo	3:05
11.	"Pero"	Pausini; Roberts; Marletta	Roberts; Marletta	Michelangelo	3:33
12.	"Flashback"	Pausini; Ettore	Carta	Carta	3:08
13.	"Venus"	Pausini; Raina; Simonetta; Esposito	Simonetta; Esposito	Simon Says!	3:31
14.	"Vale la pena"	Pausini; Coro; Faro; Mancino; Simonelli	Coro; Faro; Mancino; Simonelli	Reyes	2:59
15.	"Más allá de la superficie"	Rapetti	Vuletić	Katoo	3:19
16.	"Frente a nosotros"	Pausini; Agliardi	Carta	Carta	2:59
Total length:					52:57

Almas paralelas – 2024 digital reissue bonus tracks
No.	Title	Lyrics	Music	Producer(s)	Length
1.	"Chao"	Pausini; Smith; Di Martino; Daprelà; T. Smith	Pausini; Smith; Di Martino; Daprelà; T. Smith; Carta	Carta	3:32
2.	"Te llevarás muy lejos"	Lagona	Lagona; Mariano	Mariano	3:10
8.	"Enemiga ^{[a]}"	Ettorre	Carta	Carta	3:02
9.	"A ese amor tan nuestro ^{[a]}"	Aiello	Aiello; Carta	Carta	2:00

=== Anime parallele/Almas paralelas Deluxe ===
Contains 3 CDs: the Italian and Spanish-language editions, and 6 bonus tracks.

Anime parallele/Almas paralelas Deluxe – Disc 3 bonus tracks
No.	Title	Producer(s)	Length
3.	"Il primo passo sulla luna" ((Live in Venezia))	Simon Says!	3:17
4.	"Un buen inicio" ((Live in Sevilla))	Carta; Simon Says!	3:15
Total length:			16:36

=== Notes ===
- ^[a] – The songs “Nemica/Enemiga” and “All’amore nostro/A ese amor tan nuestro” were previously released as bonus tracks on the Anime Parallele/Almas Paralelas Deluxe

== Charts ==
Chart performance for Anime Parallele / Almas Paralelas
Chart (2023)	Peak position
Belgian Albums (Ultratop Flanders)	90
Belgian Albums (Ultratop Wallonia)	12
French Albums (SNEP)	102
Italian Albums (FIMI)	2
Spanish Albums (PROMUSICAE)	5
Swiss Albums (Schweizer Hitparade)	7

== Certifications ==
Region	Certification	Certified units/sales
Italy (FIMI)	Gold	25,000^{‡}
^{‡} Sales+streaming figures based on certification alone.
