= Non è detto =

Single by Laura Pausini

from the album Fatti sentire
- Released: 26 January 2018
- Genre: Pop
- Length: 3:27
- Label: Warner Music; Atlantic Records
- Songwriter(s): Laura Pausini; Niccolò Agliardi; Edwyn Roberts; Gianluigi Fazio

Laura Pausini singles chronology
"Ho creduto a me" (2016)	"Non è detto" (2018)	"Novo" (2018)

Music video
- "Non è detto" on YouTube "Nadie ha dicho" on YouTube "Nadie ha dicho" (featuring Gente De Zona) on YouTube

"Non è detto" is a song recorded by Italian singer Laura Pausini and written by Pausini, together with Niccolò Agliardi, Edwyn Roberts and Gianluigi Fazio. The song was released as a single on 26 January 2018, preceding her thirteenth studio album Fatti sentire. It was also recorded in Spanish, under the title "Nadie ha dicho".

== Background and composition ==
"Non è detto" is a non-autobiographical love ballad, with lyrics exploring the different chances of life, the evolving of events which puts everyone in front of choices, sometimes leading people to part ways with each other. It also remarks the need to communicate with other people, even when the things to be said can be harmful.

A tropical version of "Nadie ha dicho", featuring Cuban raggaeton band Gente De Zona, was released in March 2018.

== Music video ==
The music video for the song, directed by Gaetano Morbioli, features Italian actor Cristiano Caccamo. It was broadcast for the first time by Rai 1 on 25 January 2018, after the evening edition of news program TG1 and preceded by a preamble by journalist Vincenzo Mollica. It was shot at the Cala Jannita in Maratea, also known as "the black beach". Desaturated colors are used to create an atmosphere which aims at representing pure feelings, without any superfluous element. Pausini is shown performing the song on a small boat, with the Tyrrhenian Sea on the background. The Spanish-language version of the video was also released.

A new music video, directed by Leandro Manuel Emede, was shot in Brazil and released on 9 March 2018 to accompany the raggaeton version of "Nadie he dicho", performed with Gente De Zona.

== Live performances ==
On 10 February 2018, "Non è detto" was performed during the final night of the 68th Sanremo Music Festival, where Pausini appeared as a special guest. "Nadie ha dicho" premiered in the United States with a performance during the Lo Nuestro Awards gala on 22 February 2018, which were co-hosted by Pausini herself.

== Charts ==
=== Weekly charts ===
Chart (2018)	Peak position
Belgium (Ultratip Bubbling Under Wallonia)	37
Italy (FIMI)	7
Mexico (Billboard Mexico Airplay)	28
Mexico (Billboard Espanol Airplay)	9
Spain Airplay (PROMUSICAE)	42
Switzerland (Schweizer Hitparade)	32
US Latin Pop Airplay (Billboard)	21

=== Year-end charts ===
Chart (2018)	Position
Costa Rica Airplay (Monitor Latino)	49
Mexico Airplay (Monitor Latino)	83
Venezuela Airplay (Monitor Latino)	53

== Certifications ==
Region	Certification	Certified units/sales
Italy (FIMI)	Gold	25,000^{‡}
^{‡} Sales+streaming figures based on certification alone.
