= Un fatto ovvio =

Single by Laura Pausini

from the album Primavera in anticipo
- B-side: "Un hecho obvio"
- Released: 10 April 2009
- Genre: Pop
- Length: 3:08
- Label: Atlantic
- Songwriter: Laura Pausini

Laura Pausini singles chronology
"Primavera in anticipo (It Is My Song)" (2009)	"Un fatto ovvio" (2009)	"Con la musica alla radio" (2009)

"Un fatto ovvio" (English: An obvious fact) is the third single released 10 April 2009 from Italian singer Laura Pausini's album, Primavera in anticipo. "Un hecho obvio" is its Spanish language adaptation. The song peaked at #14 on the Italian Singles Chart.

The piano starting playing of this song is similar of those of Piano Sonata No. 14 of Beethoven in his 1st Movement's first measures.

== Track listing ==
Digital download

1. "Un fatto ovvio" – 3:08
2. "Un hecho obvio" – 3:08 (Spanish version)

== Music video ==
The video is set in the city of Berlin in 2039. The story follow a city where kissing in public is strictly forbidden by the law. But, despite these dark clouds hanging over the characters, the story has a happy ending!

== Charts ==
=== Weekly charts ===
Chart (2009)	Peak position
Italy (FIMI)	14

=== Year-end charts ===
Chart (2009)	Position
Italy (FIMI)	83
