= Novo (song) =

2018 single by Laura Pausini

Single by Laura Pausini featuring Simone & Simaria

from the album Fatti sentire
- Language: Portuguese; Spanish; English
- English title: "New"
- Released: March 30, 2018
- Recorded: March, 2018
- Genre: Latin pop; Dancehall; Reggaeton
- Length: 4:12
- Label: Warner Music; Atlantic Records
- Songwriters: Laura Pausini; Danijel Vuletic; Yoel Henriquez

Laura Pausini singles chronology
"Non è detto" (2018)	"Novo" (2018)	"Frasi a metà" (2018)

Simone & Simaria singles chronology
"Ta Tum Tum" (2018)	"Novo" (2018)	"Faxina" (2018)

Music video
- "Novo" on YouTube

"Novo" (transl. 'New') is a song by Italian singer Laura Pausini featuring the Brazilian duo Simone & Simaria, making part of the album Fatti sentire by Laura. It is the second official single of the disc, released especially in the Brazilian market.

== Background ==
Rumors that Simone & Simaria would record a song with Laura Pausini appeared in 2017 when, in an interview, it was mentioned that they received a call from an executive of Warner Music, an Italian record label, proposing the duet. A bigger clue was revealed when streaming platforms like Deezer and Spotify revealed that the album would have a special version for Brazil containing the duet.

The lyrics were written by Laura Pausini and Yoel Henriquez, and the song was composed by Danijel Vuletic. The adaptation for the Portuguese is authored by the singer herself. This is a fact unheard of in the career of the Italian, who in all her songs in Portuguese has had the help of friends or external composers in translations. Despite being mostly sung in Portuguese, there are a few Spanish-language excerpts being sung during the chorus.

This is Pausini's third partnership with a Brazilian artist. In 2001, the song Seamisai (Sei que me amavas) had the participation of Gilberto Gil. In 2013, she dueted with Ivete Sangalo in Le cose che vivi / Tudo o que eu vivo.

== Music video ==
The music video was directed by João Monteiro and Fernando Moraes, and shot in February 2018 in Brazil. It was made available on March 30, 2018, through the YouTube channel of Warner Music Italy.

== Spanish version ==
"Nuevo"

Single by Laura Pausini

from the album Fatti sentire
- Released: July 5, 2018
- Length: 4:52
- Label: Warner Music
- Songwriters: Laura Pausini; Danijel Vuletic; Yoel Henriquez

Laura Pausini singles chronology
"Non è detto" (2018)	"Nuevo" (2018)	"La soluzione" (2018)

Music video
- "Nuevo" on YouTube

"Nuevo" (transl. New) is a song by Italian singer Laura Pausini, making part of the album Fatti sentire by Laura. It is the Spanish version of the single "Novo", but released especially in the international market.

== Track listing ==
Digital download and streaming
No.	Title	Length
1.	"Novo (featuring Simone & Simaria)"	4:12
2.	"Novo (featuring Simone & Simaria – Sertaneja Remix)" (Elvis DJ Remix)	4:11
3.	"Novo (Solo Portuguese Version)"	4:12
4.	"Nuevo"	4:52

== Charts ==
Spanish-language version

Chart (2018)	Peak position
Spain Airplay (PROMUSICAE)	31
Mexico (Billboard Espanol Airplay)	16
