= LP World Tour =

2009 concert tour by Laura Pausini

LP World Tour 2009
- Tour by Laura Pausini
- Cover of the tour programme
- Associated album: Primavera in anticipo / Primavera anticipada
- Start date: 28 February 2009
- End date: 23 December 2009
- Legs: 5
- No. of shows: 71 in Europe; 16 in America; 87 in total

Laura Pausini concert chronology
- Laura Pausini Live (2005–06); LP World Tour (2009); Inedito World Tour (2011–12)

The LP World Tour 2009 was the fifth concert tour by Italian singer Laura Pausini, starting in Brescia on 28 February 2009 and ending in Milan on 23 December 2009. This tour was in support of Pausini's album Primavera in anticipo / Primavera anticipada which was released in 2008.

It reached Europe and the Americas. It was the longest world tour made by Pausini in her career so far.

== Background ==
During 2008, the singer announced about touring a whole year during 2009 from February to December, which gives her performances in Italy, Europe and the Americas. The tour took place in important cities like Madrid, Barcelona, Paris, Zürich, Geneva, Helsinki, Turku, Stockholm, Brussels and others. Then, made a few stops on North American cities, such as Dominican Republic, United States, Canada and Mexico; continues to South America reaching Argentina, Chile, Peru and Brasil.

To conclude the tour, she returned to Italy and performed during November–December and finally end the promotion. Due to the massive sold-out shows and tickets demand for the tour, the World Tour 2009 took place in Milan during six nights, five in Rome; the shows in Turin and Florence were triplicated while in Bologna, Brescia, Morrone del Sannio, Catania, Eboli, Mantua and Treviso were duplicated to please the demand.

== Broadcast and recordings ==
Laura Live was anticipated by the release of Laura Pausini's single Con la musica alla radio on 25 September 2009. The DVD presents recordings from shows in particular nights and countries. It has most of the show recorded in Italian and Spanish. For hispanoamerican countries the CD+DVD release comes with a CD that includes Spanish tracks and the DVD recorded between Italian and Spanish songs.

Also, extra features present three inedit songs with their respective video and a backstage video of the tour.

== Setlist ==
The repertory presents variations in every continent.

Italy & Europe
1. Invece no
2. Ascolta il tuo cuore
3. Come se non fosse stato mai amore
4. Rock medley: Spaccacuore/Benedetta passione/La prospettiva di me/Parlami
5. Destinazione paradiso
6. Emergenza d'amore
7. Un fatto ovvio
8. Strani amori
9. E ritorno da te
10. Vivimi
11. La geografia del mio cammino
12. Pop medley: Dove sei/Siamo noi/Il mio sbaglio più grande/Gente/Bellissimo cosí
13. Sorella terra
14. MIlle braccia
15. Le cose che vivi
16. Soft medley: Anche se non mi vuoi/Nel modo più sincero che c'è/Surrender/In assenza di te/Incancellabile
17. La mia banda suona il rock
18. Tra te e il mare
19. Resta in ascolto
20. Primavera in anticipo
21. Io canto
22. Non c'è
23. La solitudine

Notes

- In France, Belgium, and Switzerland performs On n'oublie jamais rien, on vit avec instead of Destinazione paradiso.
Spain
1. En cambio no
2. Escucha tu corazón
3. Como Si No Nos Hubiéramos Amado
4. Medley Rock: Dispárame, Dispara/Bendecida Pasión/Mi Perspectiva/Háblame
5. Destino Paraíso
6. Emergencia de Amor
7. Un Hecho Obvio
8. Amores Extraños
9. Volveré Junto A Ti
10. Víveme
11. La Geografía De Mi Camino
12. Medley Pop: Dove Sei/Somos Hoy/Un Error De Los Grandes (Every Day Is A Monday)/Gente/Bellísimo Así
13. Hermana Tierra
14. Alzando Nuestros Brazos
15. Las Cosas Que Vives
16. Medley Soft: Si No Me Quieres Hoy/Del Modo Más Sincero/Surrender/En Ausencia De Ti/Inolvidable
17. Y Mi Banda Toca El Rock
18. Entre Tú Y Mil Mares
19. Escucha Atento
20. Primavera Anticipada
21. Yo Canto
22. Se Fue
23. La Soledad
Italy – Summer Tour
1. Mille Braccia
2. Ascolta Il Tuo Cuore
3. Come Se Non Fosse Stato Mai Amore
4. Rock Medley: Spaccacuore/Benedetta Passione/La Prospettiva Di Me/Parlami/Il Mio Beneficio
5. Destinazione Paradiso
6. Un'emergenza D'amore
7. Un Fatto Ovvio
8. Strani Amori
9. E Ritorno Da Te
10. Vivimi
11. La Geografía Del Mio Cammino
12. Bellissimo Così
13. Sorella Terra
14. Invece No
15. Le Cose Che Vivi
16. Soft Medley: Il Tuo Nome In Maiuscolo/Nel Modo Più Sincero Che C'è/Surrender/Due Innamorati Come Noi/Prima Che Esci/In assenza di te/Incancellabile/Heal The World
17. La Mia Banda Suona Il Rock
18. Tra Te E Il Mare
19. Resta In Ascolto
20. Io Canto
21. Non C'è
22. La Solitudine
23. Primavera In Anticipo
The Americas
1. Alzando Nuestros Brazos
2. Escucha Tu Corazón
3. Como Si No Nos Hubiéramos Amado
4. Medley Rock: Dispárame, Dispara/Bendecida Pasión/Mi Perspectiva/Háblame/Mis Beneficios
5. Con La Musica En La Radio
6. Emergencia De Amor
7. Un Hecho Obvio
8. Amores Extraños
9. Volveré Junto A Ti
10. Víveme
11. La Geografía De Mi Camino
12. Bellísimo Así
13. En Cambio No
14. Hermana Tierra
15. Las Cosas Que Vives
16. Medley Acústico: Tu Nombre En Mayúsculas/Del Modo Más Sincero/Surrender/Dos Enamorados/Antes de Irte/Inolvidable/Heal The World
17. Y Mi Banda Toca El Rock
18. Entre Tú Y Mil Mares
19. Escucha Atento
20. Primavera anticipada
21. Yo Canto
22. Se Fue
23. La soledad

Notes

- Added to the show since the night in Los Angeles until the end of the American leg (1)
- During the show in Santo Domingo, she performed a cover from Juan Luis Guerra entitled "Bachata Rosa" instead of "Destino Paraíso"
- At the concert in Lima, she made a very special performance of "Quiero Decirte Que Te Amo" wearing a Tiffanny tiara, included Gente in the Medley Acústico due to the Peruvian fan club named as the song and "Un Hecho Obvio" was not performed.
- The nights in Buenos Aires and Santiago, Pausini paid tribute to Violeta Parra singing "Gracias A La Vida"
México
1. Alzando Nuestros Brazos
2. Escucha Tu Corazón
3. Como Si No Nos Hubiéramos Amado
4. Rock Medley: Dispárame Dispara/Bendecida Pasión/Mi Perspectiva/Háblame/Mis Beneficios
5. Amores Extraños
6. Volveré Junto A Ti
7. Víveme
8. Emergencia De Amor
9. En Cambio No
10. Hermana Tierra
11. Las Cosas Que Vives
12. Soft Medley: Cielito Lindo/Cuando Se Ama/Surrender/Del Modo Más Sincero/Prima Che Esci/Gente/En Ausencia De Ti/Inolvidable/Heal The World
13. Y Mi Banda Toca El Rock
14. Escucha Atento
15. Entre Tú Y Mil Mares
16. Con La Música En La Radio
17. Yo Canto
18. Se Fue
19. La Soledad
20. Primavera Anticipada
Brazil
1. Mille Braccia
2. Ascolta Il Tuo Cuore
3. Come Se Non Fosse Stato Mai Amore
4. Rock Medley: Dispárame, Dispara/Benedetta Passione/La Prospettiva Di Me/Parlami/Il Mio Beneficio
5. Con la musica alla radio
6. Un'emergenza d'amore
7. Un fatto ovvio
8. Strani Amori
9. E Ritorno Da Te
10. Vivimi
11. La geografia del mio cammino
12. Bellissimo Così
13. Agora Não
14. Sorella Terra
15. Le Cose Che Vivi
16. Acoustic Medley: Seamisai (Sei que me amavas)/Nel Modo Più Sincero Che C'è/Surrender/Apaixonados Como Nós/Gente/In Assenza Di Te/Inesquecível/Heal The World
17. La Mia Banda Banda Suona Il Rock
18. Tra Te E Il Mare
19. Resta In Ascolto
20. Primavera in anticipo
21. Io Canto
22. Se Fue
23. La solitudine

Notes

- Performs the new song: "Con La Musica Alla Radio".
- At the end of the concert performs "Agora Não" in an A Capella version.
Canada
1. Mille Braccia
2. Ascolta Il Tuo Cuore
3. Come Se Non Fosse Stato Mai Amore
4. Rock Medley: Dispárame, Dispara/Benedetta Passione/La Prospettiva Di Me/Parlami/Il Mio Beneficio
5. Destinazione Paradiso
6. Un'emergenza D'amore
7. Un Fatto Ovvio
8. Strani Amori (song) Strani Amori
9. E Ritorno Da Te
10. Vivimi
11. La Geografia Del Mio Cammino
12. Bellissimo Così
13. Sorella terra
14. Invece no
15. Le cose che vivi
16. Acoustic Medley: Il Tuo Nome In Maiuscolo/Nel Modo Più Sincero Che C'è/Surrender/Due Innamorati Come Noi/Prima Che Esci/In Assenza Di Te/Incancellabile/Heal The World
17. La Mia Banda Suona Il Rock
18. Tra Te E Il Mare
19. Resta In Ascolto
20. Io Canto
21. Se Fue
22. La Solitudine
23. Primavera In Anticipo
Italy – Final Leg
1. Invece No
2. Ascolta Il Tuo Cuore
3. Come Se Non Fosse Stato Mai Amore
4. Rock Medley: Spaccacuore/Benedetta Passione/La Prospettiva Di Me/Parlami/Il Mio Beneficio
5. Destinazione Paradiso
6. Un'emergenza D'amore
7. Un Fatto Ovvio
8. Strani Amori
9. E Ritorno Da Te
10. Vivimi
11. La geografia del mio cammino
12. Bellissimo Così
13. Sorella Terra
14. Mille Braccia
15. Le Cose Che Vivi
16. Acoustic Medley: Seamisai/Nel Modo Più Sincero Che C'è/Surrender/ Prima Che Esci/In Assenza Di Te/Incancellabile/Heal The World
17. La Mia Banda Suona Il Rock
18. Tra Te E Il Mare
19. Resta in Ascolto
20. Primavera in anticipo
21. Io Canto
22. Non C'è
23. La Solitudine
24. Con La musica alla radio
25. Non Sono Lei
26. Casomai

Notes

- During the show in Jesolo¨"Non Sono Lei" was added until the last show.
- Beginning with the shows in Rome until the end of the tour, "Casomai" was included on the setlist

== Tour dates ==
Date	City	Country	Venue
Italy: First Leg
28 February 2009	Brescia	Italy	Palasport San Filippo
5 March 2009	Turin	Italy	Palasport Olimpico
6 March 2009	Turin	Italy	Palasport Olimpico
7 March 2009	Mantua	Italy	PalaBam
9 March 2009	Perugia	Italy	PalaEvangelisti
11 March 2009	Florence	Italy	Nelson Mandela Forum
14 March 2009	Rome	Italy	PalaLottomatica
15 March 2009	Rome	Italy	PalaLottomatica
16 March 2009	Rome	Italy	PalaLottomatica
19 March 2009	Eboli	Italy	PalaSele
21 March 2009	Reggio Calabria	Italy	PalaCalafiore
24 March 2009	Acireale	Italy	PalaTupparello
25 March 2009	Acireale	Italy	PalaTupparello
27 March 2009	Caserta	Italy	PalaMaggiò
28 March 2009	Caserta	Italy	PalaMaggiò
31 March 2009	Ancona	Italy	PalaRossini
1 April 2009	Pesaro	Italy	Adriatic Arena
3 April 2009	Bologna	Italy	Futurshow Station
5 April 2009	Brescia	Italy	PalaBrescia
7 April 2009	Bolzano	Italy	PalaOnda
14 April 2009	Milan	Italy	Mediolanum Forum
16 April 2009	Treviso	Italy	PalaVerde
17 April 2009	Treviso	Italy	PalaVerde
19 April 2009	Livorno	Italy	PalaLivorno
20 April 2009	Genoa	Italy	Vaillant Palace
22 April 2009	Milan	Italy	Mediolanum Forum
23 April 2009	Milan	Italy	Mediolanum Forum
24 April 2009	Milan	Italy	Mediolanum Forum
Europe
28 April 2009	Madrid	Spain	Madrid Arena
30 April 2009	Barcelona	Spain	Palau Sant Jordi
2 May 2009	Marseille	France	Le Dôme de Marseille
4 May 2009	Nantes	France	Le Zénith
6 May 2009	Metz	France	Galaxie Amnéville
8 May 2009	Zürich	Switzerland	Hallenstadion
10 May 2009	Geneva	Switzerland	SEG Geneva Arena
12 May 2009	Paris	France	Zénith de Paris
17 May 2009	Tampere	Finland	Tampere Hall
18 May 2009	Turku	Finland	HK Arena
20 May 2009	Helsinki	Finland	Hartwall Areena
22 May 2009	Stockholm	Sweden	Cirkus
25 May 2009	Brussels	Belgium	Forest National
27 May 2009	Dortmund	Germany	Westfalenhalle
30 May 2009	Valladolid	Spain	Estadio Nuevo José Zorrilla IV Festival Valladolid Latino
2 June 2009	Florence	Italy	Nelson Mandela Forum
Summer Tour
25 June 2009	Ravenna	Italy	PalaDeAndrè
27 June 2009	Codroipo	Italy	Villa Manin
29 June 2009	Verona	Italy	Verona Arena
1 July 2009	Piazzola sul Brenta	Italy	Anfiteatro Camerini
3 July 2009	Monza	Italy	Villa Reale di Monza
5 July 2009	Alessandria	Italy	Stadium Moccagatta
8 July 2009	Locarno	Switzerland	Piazza Grande Moon&Stars Festival
9 July 2009	Bergamo	Italy	Arena estiva della Fiera di Bergamo
11 July 2009	Naples	Italy	Mostra d'Oltremare
14 July 2009	Teramo	Italy	Nuovo Stadio Comunale a Piano D'Accio
16 July 2009	Barletta	Italy	Castello
18 July 2009	Palermo	Italy	Velodromo Paolo Borsellino
21 July 2009	Valletta	Malta	Luxol Parade Grounds
25 July 2009	Cagliari	Italy	Fiera Campionaria
15 August 2009	Monte Carlo	Monaco	Salle des Etoiles
The Americas
19 September 2009	Santo Domingo	Dominican Republic	Palacio de los Deportes Virgilio Travieso Soto
24 September 2009	Los Angeles	United States	Wiltern Theater
27 September 2009	Lima	Peru	Jockey Club
30 September 2009	Santiago	Chile	Movistar Arena
2 October 2009	Buenos Aires	Argentina	Estadio G.E.B.A.
4 October 2009	Rio de Janeiro	Brazil	Citibank Hall
6 October 2009	São Paulo	Brazil	Credicard Hall
7 October 2009	São Paulo	Brazil	Credicard Hall
10 October 2009	Mexico City	Mexico	National Auditorium
12 October 2009	Monterrey	Mexico	Arena Monterrey
14 October 2009	Hollywood	United States	Hard Rock Live
16 October 2009	New York City	United States	Lincoln Center
18 October 2009	Atlantic City	United States	Mark G. Etess Arena
21 October 2009	Montreal	Canada	Bell Centre
23 October 2009	Toronto	Canada	Air Canada Centre
25 October 2009	Mashantucket	United States	MGM Theatre at Foxwoods
Italy: Final Leg
13 November 2009	Rimini	Italy	105 Stadium
14 November 2009	Mantua	Italy	PalaBam
25 November 2009	Jesolo	Italy	Palazzo del Turismo
27 November 2009	Rome	Italy	PalaLottomatica
28 November 2009	Rome	Italy	PalaLottomatica
1 December 2009	Acireale	Italy	PalaTupparello
3 December 2009	Eboli	Italy	PalaSele
5 December 2009	Bologna	Italy	Futurshow Station
7 December 2009	Florence	Italy	Nelson Mandela Forum
9 December 2009	Turin	Italy	Palasport Olimpico
22 December 2009	Milan	Italy	Mediolanum Forum
23 December 2009	Milan	Italy	Mediolanum Forum

Cancellations and rescheduled shows

15 May 2009	Copenhagen	Denmark	Falkoner Theatre	The show was cancelled due to Pausini having voice problems.
17 November 2009	Turin	Italy	PalaOlimpico	The show was rescheduled to 9 December 2009 due to pandemic flu.
20 November 2009	Milan	Italy	Mediolanum Forum	The show was rescheduled to 22 December 2009 due to pandemic flu.
21 November 2009	Milan	Italy	Mediolanum Forum	The show was rescheduled to 23 December 2009 due to pandemic flu.

=== Box office score data (Billboard) ===
Venue	City	Tickets sold / Available	Gross revenue
Palasport Olimpico (March)	Turin	18,638 / 18,638 (100%)	$828,003 *
PalaEvangelisti	Perugia	5,503 / 5,503 (100%)	$216,296 *
Nelson Mandela Forum	Florence	6,817 / 7,600 (90%)	$292,884 *
PalaLottomatica (March)	Rome	23,311 / 23,311 (100%)	$1,079,429 *
Mediolanum Forum (Apr)	Milan	40,072 / 40,072 (100%)	$2,356,899 *
Fiera Campionaria	Cagliari	9,085 / 9,120 (99%)	$538,753 **
Wiltern Theater	Los Angeles	1,236 / 1,888 (65%)	$97,556 ***
Citibank Hall	Rio de Janeiro	2,251 / 3,336 (67%)	$236,487 **
Credicard Hall	São Paulo	7,512 / 8,096 (93%)	$808,085 **
National Auditorium	Mexico City	8,565 / 9,569 (90%)	$341,004 ***
Bell Centre	Montreal	2,246 / 3.000 (75%)	$212,480 ****
PalaLottomatica (Nov)	Rome	14,390 / 15,426 (93%)	$777,263
Futurshow Station (Dec)	Bologna	8,348 / 11,500 (73%)	$433,962
Palasport Olimpico (Dec)	Turin	9,273 / 10,210 (91%)	$485,785
Mediolanum Forum (Dec)	Milan	20,036 / 20,036 (100%)	$1,299,280
TOTAL		138,173 / 148,748 (93%)	$7,570,989

== Band ==
- Paolo Carta – guitar / musical director
- Emiliano Bassi – drums
- Bruno Zucchetti – keyboards
- Mateo Bassi – bass
- Gabriele Fersini – guitar
- Gianluigi Fazio – background vocals
- Emanuela Cortesi – background vocals
- Roberta Granà – background vocals
