= Teo Bok =

Italian singer-songwriter (born 2003)

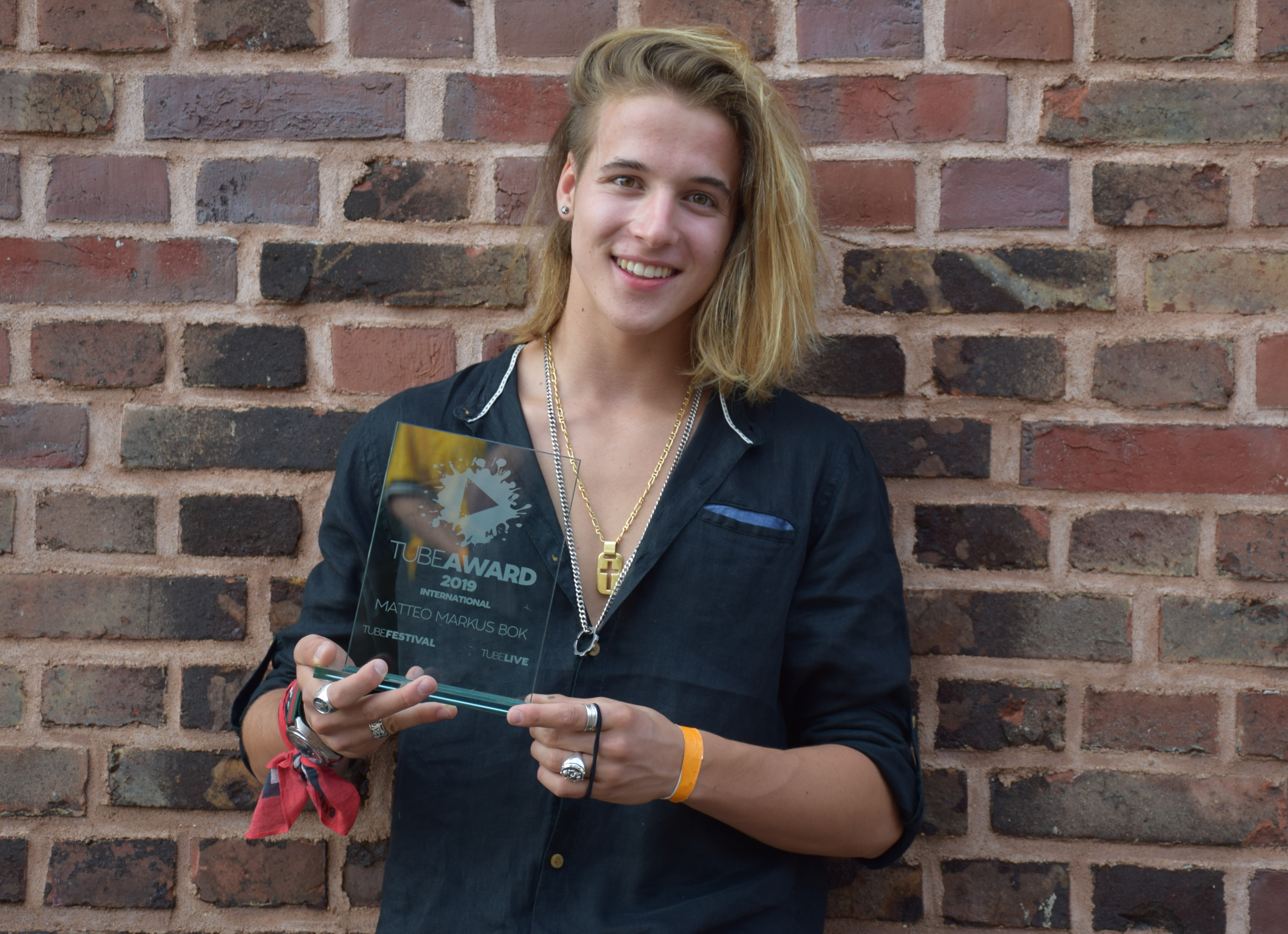
- Bok at the TubeAward in 2019

Background information
- Born: Matteo Markus Bok; May 16, 2003 (age 23); Milan, Italy
- Origin: Milan, Italy
- Genres: Pop, Latin pop
- Occupations: Singer, songwriter
- Instruments: Vocals, guitar, piano
- Years active: 2012–present
- Website: www.matteomarkusbok.com

Matteo Markus Bok (born 16 May 2003 in Milan), known professionally as Teo Bok, is an Italian pop singer and songwriter.

In addition to Italian and German, he speaks fluent English and Spanish. At the age of nine, he portrayed Young Simba in the musical The Lion King. In 2016, he participated in the fourth season of the German talent show The Voice Kids, reaching the final under the mentorship of Lena Meyer-Landrut.

== Biography ==
Bok grew up in Milan and attended the Collegio San Carlo before transferring to the American School of Milan. He plays both guitar and piano. In the spring of 2017, he participated in the Italian talent show Italia's Got Talent.

In 2017, he signed with German producer Oliver deVille and released his debut single "Just One Lie", followed by a tour in Germany and an appearance on the television program ZDF-Fernsehgarten. In early 2018, Bok performed as the opening act for the Italian and German legs of the Soy Luna tour. Later that year, he released the self-written bilingual single "El Ritmo (AHI AHI AHI)".

In April 2019, he released his debut studio album Cruisin', followed on 24 September 2019 by his autobiography titled Promise. On 3 August 2019, he won the TubeAward in the "International" category at the TubeFestival.

== Grammy Award nomination ==
In late 2025, Bok achieved international recognition as a core member and vocalist of the Miami-based band Los Wizzards. The group received a nomination at the 68th Annual Grammy Awards (held in February 2026) for Best Latin Rock or Alternative Album for their project ALGORHYTHM.

== X Factor Italy 2026 ==
In 2026, Bok entered the 20th edition of the Italian talent show X Factor Italy. After passing the initial Auditions and qualifying from the Bootcamps, he advanced to the Last Call stage.

During the Last Calls, Matteo performed in the final duel under mentor Francesco Gabbani, who ultimately opted to use his X-Pass on another contestant, resulting in Matteo's initial elimination just short of the live shows. However, show host Giorgia was granted two wild-card "X-Passes" allowing her to select eliminated contestants for a public vote. The selected acts will face a repêchage runoff during the first Live Show, where a televote by the viewing audience will determine who earns the final spot in the live competition.

During the first Live Show on 22 October 2026, Matteo won the public televote and was successfully reinstated into the competition. As a result of the repêchage, he officially joined Francesco Gabbani’s final category for the remainder of the live episodes.

== Discography ==
=== Albums ===
- Cruisin' (2019)

=== Singles ===
- Just One Lie (2017)
- Sunshower (2017)
- This Christmas (2018)
- El Ritmo (AHI AHI AHI) (2018)
- In The Middle (2018)
- Mrs Lonely (2018)
- Besos Besos (2019)

== Bibliography ==
- Promise (2019)

== See also ==
- X Factor Italy 2026
