= Primavera in anticipo =

Primavera in anticipo/Primavera anticipada
- Italian-language edition

Studio album by Laura Pausini
- Released: 11 November 2008
- Recorded: 2008 – ORS Oliveta Recording Studios (Castelbolognese, RA), Forum Music Village (Rome), Logic Studios (Milan), Studio De La Seine (Paris), Studio Impatto (Bologna), Abbey Road Studios (London)
- Genre: Pop rock
- Length: 51:46
- Languages: Italian, Spanish, Portuguese
- Label: Warner Music
- Producers: Laura Pausini, Dado Parisini, Celso Valli, Paolo Carta

Laura Pausini chronology
San Siro 2007 (2007)	Primavera in anticipo/Primavera anticipada (2008)	Laura Live World Tour 09/Laura Live Gira Mundial 09 (2009)

Singles from Primavera in anticipo/Primavera anticipada
- 1. "Invece no" Released: 24 October 2008; 2. "Primavera in anticipo (It Is My Song)" Released: 2 January 2009; 3. "Un fatto ovvio" Released: 10 April 2009

Primavera in anticipo and Primavera anticipada (English: Early Spring) are the tenth studio albums by Italian singer Laura Pausini, released on 11 November 2008, by Warner Music.

Produced by Pausini with Paolo Carta, Celso Valli and Dado Parisini, the album has been described by Pausini as "a complex album, in which I can completely recognize myself".

It is Pausini's first album of new material since Resta in ascolto / Escucha, released in 2004. The album was described by music critics as Pausini's most personal album to date. Pausini co-wrote each song included in the album, except the track "Prima che esci" / "Antes de irte", written by Italian rock singer-songwriter Gianluca Grignani. The album features the song "Primavera in anticipo (It Is My Song)" / "Primavera anticipada (It Is My Song)", a duet with English singer James Blunt, and also includes collaborations with Italian songwriters Niccolò Agliardi, Cheope and Daniel Vuletic.

The album debuted at number one on the Italian Albums Chart and held the top spot for nine consecutive weeks, It was later certified Diamond by the Federation of the Italian Music Industry. The album has sold 500,000 copies in Italy and 1.5 million worldwide.

Its Spanish-language version also won Best Female Pop Vocal Album at the Latin Grammy Awards of 2009.

The album was anticipated by the single "Invece no" / "En cambio no", released on 24 October 2008. The song was also translated in Portuguese with the title "Agora não" and included in the Brazilian and Portuguese version of the album. It also spawned the singles "Primavera in anticipo (It Is My Song)" / "Primavera anticipada (It Is My Song)" and "Un fatto ovvio" / "Un hecho obvio".

== Background, conception and themes ==
Pausini started working on the album in late 2007, and spent most of 2008 writing and recording it between Italy, London and Los Angeles.

"The album opens with Winter, which represents pain. It goes on with Autumn's reflections, with Summer's fantasy and it ends with the interior balance and calm represented by Spring."
— Laura Pausini speaks to la Repubblica about the meaning of her album.

The album was inspired by the events in Pausini's life between 2004 and 2008. In an interview Pausini explained that those years were marked by different kinds of feelings, therefore the album represents four different moments, symbolized by the four astronomical seasons. For that reason, Primavera in anticipo was described by Italian music critics as Pausini's most personal and mature recording, exploring themes such as self-love, the relationship with her new partner and guitarist Paolo Carta, and grief for her grandmother's death.

Particularly, Pausini dedicated to her grandmother the lead single from the album "Invece no" / "En cambio no", a song focused on the pain of those who weren't able to confess everything to a loved person who died:

Among all the song I wrote and sang during my career, this is the one which scares me the most, but it also makes me calm more than every other one. It was composed at the piano, and I wrote the music with Paolo Carta. The lyrics, written by me and Niccolò Agliardi, were inspired by my grandmother's dead. She was a fundamental figure in my life. I thought about the pain that a lot of people felt because they weren't able to tell each other everything they wanted. I care a lot about this reflection.

Pausini later added:

It came from my desire to tell people to not be afraid to speak up. I've lived the pain of a goodbye and of realizing you haven't said all you needed to say. Fortunately, when my grandmother died, I had told her everything.

The track "La geografia del mio cammino" / "La geografía de mi camino" cites Pausini's first single, "La solitudine" / "La soledad", "Loneliness" in English, describing solitude as a goal to be reached and not as an unease. The song is about Pausini's will to look inside herself and not to lose self-confidence even in the darkest moments.

The only song in the album which is not focused on personal feelings is "Sorella terra" / "Hermana tierra", a prayer dedicated to Earth and inspired by Al Gore's environmental activist movement.

== Reception ==
=== Critical reception ===
Professional ratings
Review scores
Source	Rating
Allmusic	3.5/5 stars
Musica e dischi	4.5/5 stars

The album received positive reviews by various music critics. Allmusic's Jason Birchmeier praised Pausini's voice and songwriting and claimed that the album showcases "a more personalized cycle of songs", but also noted a stylistic similarity with her 2004's Escucha, resulting in a "sense of frustration for anyone hoping for a change in direction".

Antonio Orlando, writing for the Italian music magazine Musica e dischi, stated that the album is completely coherent with her style and commented that, even if lyrics aren't grammatically perfect, it is "an unexceptionable album in every detail". Italian newspaper La Stampa gave the album a positive review too, in which Pausini is praised for the intensity of her renditions and is claimed that she is "more comfortable in songwriting" and that she manages "one of the most personal voices in the worldwide pop scene".

=== Chart performance ===
The album debuted at number one on the Italian Albums Chart and stayed atop the chart for 9 consecutive weeks. The album has sold over 500,000 copies in Italy and has been certified 7-times Platinum by the Federation of the Italian Music Industry. In Switzerland Primavera in anticipo debuted and peaked at number four on the Swiss Albums Chart and was later certified Platinum by the International Federation of the Phonographic Industry of Switzerland.

Both the Italian and Spanish versions of the album were released in three Latin American countries, including Mexico, where the Italian version peaked at number 67, while the Spanish version of the album debuted and peaked at number 8, spent 21 weeks on the Top 100 and was certified Gold by the Asociación Mexicana de Productores de Fonogramas y Videogramas.

== Promotion ==
To promote the album, Pausini embarked on her World Tour 2009, a concert tour which started from Turin on 5 March 2009, reached Europe in May 2009 and then South America and the United States in Autumn 2009. The last leg of the tour took place in Italy in November 2009. A CD of the tour, along with a DVD, was released on 27 November 2009 with the title Laura Live World Tour 09 / Laura Live Gira Mundial 09.

== Track listing ==
=== Primavera in anticipo ===
No.	Title	Lyrics	Music	Length
1.	"Mille braccia"	Laura Pausini, Cheope	Paolo Carta	3:29
2.	"Invece no"	Pausini, Niccolò Agliardi	Pausini, Carta	3:55
3.	"Primavera in anticipo (It Is My Song)" (Duet with James Blunt)	Pausini, Cheope, James Blunt	Daniel Vuletic	3:28
4.	"Nel modo più sincero che c'è"	Pausini, Cheope	Vuletic	3:26
5.	"Un fatto ovvio"	Pausini, Cheope	Vuletic	3:08
6.	"Il mio beneficio"	Pausini, Cheope	Vuletic	3:46
7.	"Prima che esci"	Gianluca Grignani	Grignani	3:46
8.	"Più di ieri"	Pausini, Cheope	Vuletic	3:33
9.	"Bellissimo così"	Pausini, Cheope	Federica Fratoni, Daniele Coro	3:52
10.	"L'impressione"	Pausini, Cheope	Vuletic	4:06
11.	"La geografia del mio cammino"	Pausini, Cheope, Agliardi	Pausini, Carta	3:54
12.	"Ogni colore al cielo"	Pausini, Cheope	Antonio Galbiati, Fratoni, Carta	3:48
13.	"Primavera in anticipo"	Pausini, Cheope	Vuletic	3:28
14.	"Sorella Terra"	Pausini, Cheope	Vuletic	4:08

iTunes bonus tracks
No.	Title	Lyrics	Music	Portuguese adaptation	Length
15.	"Un giorno dove vivere"	Pausini, Cheope	Carta	——	4:18
16.	"Agora não"	Pausini, Agliardi	Pausini, Carta	Pausini, Carolina Leal	3:56

=== Primavera anticipada ===
No.	Title	Lyrics	Music	Spanish adaptation	Length
1.	"Alzando nuestros brazos"	Laura Pausini, Cheope	Paolo Carta	Jorge Ballesteros	3:29
2.	"En cambio no"	Pausini, Niccolò Agliardi,	Pausini, Carta	J. Ballesteros	3:55
3.	"Primavera anticipada (It Is My Song)" (Duet with James Blunt)	Pausini, Cheope, James Blunt	Daniel Vuletic	Ignacio Ballesteros	3:28
4.	"Del modo más sincero"	Pausini, Cheope	Vuletic	I. Ballesteros	3:25
5.	"Un hecho obvio"	Pausini, Cheope	Vuletic	J. Ballesteros	3:07
6.	"Mis beneficios"	Pausini, Cheope	Vuletic	J. Ballesteros	3:45
7.	"Antes de irte"	Gianluca Grignani	Grignani	I. Ballesteros	3:46
8.	"Más que ayer"	Pausini, Cheope	Vuletic	I. Ballesteros	3:32
9.	"Bellísimo así"	Pausini, Cheope	Federica Fratoni, Daniele Coro	J. Ballesteros	3:52
10.	"La impresión"	Pausini, Cheope	Vuletic	I. Ballesteros	4:05
11.	"La geografía de mi camino"	Pausini, Cheope, Agliardi	Carta, Pausini	J. Ballesteros	3:53
12.	"Cada color al cielo"	Pausini, Cheope	Antonio Galbiati, Fratoni, Carta	J. Ballesteros	3:47
13.	"Primavera anticipada"	Pausini, Cheope	Vuletic	I. Ballesteros	3:28
14.	"Hermana tierra"	Pausini, Cheope	Vuletic	J. Ballesteros	4:08

iTunes bonus tracks
No.	Title	Lyrics	Music	Spanish adaptation	Length
15.	"Un tiempo en el que vivir"	Pausini, Cheope	Carta	I. Ballesteros	4:16

== Charts ==
=== Weekly charts ===
Chart (2008–2009)	Peak position
Argentine Albums (CAPIF)	20
Austrian Albums (Ö3 Austria)	7
Belgian Albums (Ultratop Flanders)	82
Belgian Albums (Ultratop Wallonia)	22
Croatian Albums (HDU)	38
Croatian Albums (HDU)	8
Dutch Albums (Album Top 100)	59
European Top 100 Albums (Billboard)	14
Finnish Albums (Suomen virallinen lista)	25
French Albums (SNEP)	27
German Albums (Offizielle Top 100)	34
Greek Albums (IFPI)	35
Italian Albums (FIMI)	1
Mexican Albums (Top 100 Mexico)	8
Spanish Albums (Promusicae)	10
Swiss Albums (Schweizer Hitparade)	4
Swedish Albums (Sverigetopplistan)	43
US Latin Pop Albums (Billboard)	4
US Top Latin Albums (Billboard)	15

=== Year-end charts ===
Chart (2008)	Position
French Albums (SNEP)	188
Italian Albums (FIMI)	3
Mexican Albums (AMPROFON)	99
Swiss Albums (Schweizer Hitparade)	40
Chart (2009)	Position
Belgian Albums (Ultratop Wallonia)	68
European Top 100 Albums (Billboard)	41
Italian Albums (FIMI)	7
Swiss Albums (Schweizer Hitparade)	21
US Latin Pop Albums (Billboard)	18
US Top Latin Albums (Billboard)	73

== Certifications and sales ==
Region	Certification	Certified units/sales
Italy (FIMI)	Diamond	500,000
Mexico (AMPROFON)	Gold	40,000^{^}
Switzerland (IFPI Switzerland)	Platinum	20,000^{^}
^{^} Shipments figures based on certification alone.

== Personnel ==
Credits adapted from Primavera in anticipo's liner notes:

=== Production credits ===
- Jonathan Allen – engineer
- Luca Bignardi – programming, engineer, mixing
- Chirs Bolse – assistant
- Matteo Bolzoni – assistant, engineer
- Marco Borsatti – assistant, engineer
- Paolo Carta – producer, programming, engineer
- Max "MC" Costa – programming, sound design
- Nicola Fantozzi – engineer, assistant engineer
- Gabriele Gigli – assistant
- Bernie Grundman – mastering
- Jon Jacobs – mixing
- Steve Lyon – engineer
- Davide Palmiotto – assistant
- Gabriele Parisi – engineer
- Dado Parisini – producer
- Fabio Patrignani – engineer
- Fabrizio Pausini – studio manager
- Laura Pausini – producer
- Stéphane Reichart – engineer
- Celso Valli – producer

=== Music credits ===
- Niccolò Agliardi – composer
- Prisca Amori – concertmaster
- B.I.M. Orchestra – strings
- The children of the "Sylvia Young School" – backing vocals
- Curt Bisquera – drums, percussions
- James Blunt – vocals, composer
- Paolo Carta – arrangements, string arrangements, guitars, composer
- Cesare Chiodo – bass
- Daniele Coro – composer
- Cheope – composer
- Manuela Cortesi – backing vocals
- Stefano De Marco – backing vocals
- Lance Ellington – backing vocals
- Emiliano Fantuzzi – guitars
- Gabriele Fersini – guitars
- Federica Fratoni – composer
- Andy Findon – flute, pan flute
- Riccardo Galardini – guitars
- Antonio Galbiati – composer
- Alfredo Golino – drums
- Roberta Granà – backing vocals
- Isobelle Griffith – orchestra contractor
- Gianluca Grignani – composer
- Peter Howarth – backing vocals
- London Orchestra – orchestra
- Jenny O'Grady – choral co-ordination
- Charlotte Matthews – orchestra contractor (assistant)
- Perry Montague Mason – concertmaster
- Dado Parisini – piano, keyboards, string arrangements, arrangements
- Laura Pausini – vocals, backing vocals, composer
- Rocco Petruzzi – string arrangements, orchestra contractor
- Roma Sinfonietta's Orchestra – orchestra
- Hayley Sanderson – backing vocals
- Luca Scarpa – piano, hammond
- Giorgio Secco – guitars
- Beverly Skett – backing vocals
- Giuseppe Tortora – orchestra contractor
- Celso Valli – arrangements, piano, keyboards, string arrangements
- Massimo Varini – guitars
- Daniel Vuletic – composer

== Release history ==
Region	Release date	Edition	Format	Label
United States	11 November 2008	Spanish-language edition	CD, digital download	Warner Music
Latin America	11 November 2008	Spanish-language edition	CD, digital download	Warner Music
Italy	14 November 2008	Italian-language edition	CD, digital download	Warner Music
Italy	14 November 2008	Platinum Edition	2× CD + DVD	Warner Music
France	17 November 2008	Italian-language edition	CD, digital download	Warner Music
