= Fatti sentire =

Fatti sentire/Hazte sentir
- Italian-language edition

Studio album by Laura Pausini
- Released: March 16, 2018
- Genre: Pop
- Length: 50:52
- Language: Italian • Spanish • English • Portuguese
- Label: Atlantic; Warner
- Producer: Laura Pausini

Laura Pausini chronology
Laura Xmas/Laura Navidad (2016)	Fatti sentire/Hazte sentir (2018)	Anime Parallele/Almas Paralelas (2023)

Singles from Fatti sentire/Hazte sentir
- 1. "Non è detto" Released: January 26, 2018; 2. "Novo" Released: March 16, 2018; 3. "Frasi a metà" Released: April 6, 2018; 4. "E.STA.A.TE" Released: June 1, 2018; 5. "La Soluzione" Released: September 23, 2018; 6. "Il Coraggio di Andare" Released: November 20, 2018

Fatti sentire and Hazte sentir (English: Speak Up, lit. 'Make Yourself Feel') are the fourteenth studio albums by Italian singer Laura Pausini, released on March 16, 2018 by Warner Music. The album is primarily in Italian and Spanish, but it also contains sections in Portuguese and English. At the 19th Annual Latin Grammy Awards, the Spanish-language version of the album (Hazte sentir) won the award for Best Traditional Pop Vocal Album.

The album was promoted by the Fatti Sentire World Tour. A reissue of the Italian and Spanish-language editions, Fatti sentire ancora and Hazte sentir más, was released on December 7, 2018 . It includes new versions of some of the tracks as duets with artists, such as Simone & Simaria, Biagio Antonacci, Carlos Rivera and Gente de Zona, and their solo versions.

== Track listing ==
=== Fatti sentire ===
Standard edition
No.	Title	Lyrics	Music	Length
1.	"Non è detto"	Niccolò Agliardi	Laura Pausini, Edwyn Roberts, Gianluigi Fazio	3:27
2.	"Nuevo"	Pausini, Yoel Henríquez	Daniel Vuletic	4:12
3.	"La soluzione"	Massimiliano Pelan, Giulia Anania, Fabio De Martino, Stefano Paviani	Pausini, Massimiliano Pelan, Giulia Anania, Fabio De Martino, Stefano Paviani	3:53
4.	"E.STA.A.TE"	Pausini, Virginio Simonelli	Paolo Carta	3:35
5.	"Frasi a metà"	Niccolò Agliardi	Pausini, Edwyn Roberts	4:01
6.	"Le due finestre"	Pausini, Eric Silver, Nikki Williams, Enrico Nigiotti	Eric Silver, Nikki Williams, Enrico Nigiotti, Samuel Galvagno	4:19
7.	"Fantastico (Fai quello che sei)"	Pausini, Virginio Simonelli	Pausini, Paolo Carta	3:34
8.	"No River Is Wilder"	Pausini	Paolo Carta	3:20
9.	"L'ultima cosa che ti devo"	Pausini	Paolo Carta	3:38
10.	"Un progetto di vita in comune"	Pausini, Cheope	Daniel Vuletic	3:16
11.	"Il caso è chiuso"	Pausini, Virginio Simonelli	Daniel Vuletic	3:29
12.	"Zona d'ombra"	Pausini, Niccolò Agliardi	Joseph Carta	2:50
13.	"Francesca (Piccola Aliena)"	Pausini	Daniel Vuletic	3:31
14.	"Il coraggio di andare"	Pausini, Tony Maiello	Tony Maiello, Marco Salvati, Enrico Palmosi, Marco Rettani	3:45
Total length:				50:52

Brazilian edition
No.	Title	Lyrics	Music	Length
2.	"Novo" (featuring Simone & Simaria)	Pausini, Yoel Henríquez	Daniel Vuletic	4:12
Total length:				50:52

Fatti sentire ancora (reissue)
No.	Title	Lyrics	Music	Length
1.	"Non è detto"	Niccolò Agliardi	Laura Pausini, Edwyn Roberts, Gianluigi Fazio	3:27
2.	"Il coraggio di andare" (featuring Biagio Antonacci)	Pausini, Tony Maiello	Tony Maiello, Marco Salvati, Enrico Palmosi, Marco Rettani	3:45
3.	"Novo" (featuring Simone & Simaria)	Pausini, Yoel Henríquez	Daniel Vuletic	4:12
4.	"La soluzione"	Massimiliano Pelan, Giulia Anania, Fabio De Martino, Stefano Paviani	Pausini, Massimiliano Pelan, Giulia Anania, Fabio De Martino, Stefano Paviani	3:53
5.	"E.STA.A.TE"	Pausini, Virginio Simonelli	Paolo Carta	3:35
6.	"Frasi a metà"	Niccolò Agliardi	Pausini, Edwyn Roberts	4:01
7.	"Le due finestre"	Pausini, Eric Silver, Nikki Williams, Enrico Nigiotti	Eric Silver, Nikki Williams, Enrico Nigiotti, Samuel Galvagno	4:19
8.	"Fantastico (Fai quello che sei)"	Pausini, Virginio Simonelli	Pausini, Paolo Carta	3:34
9.	"No River Is Wilder"	Pausini	Paolo Carta	3:20
10.	"L'ultima cosa che ti devo"	Pausini	Paolo Carta	3:38
11.	"Novo"	Pausini, Yoel Henríquez	Daniel Vuletic	4:12
12.	"Un progetto di vita in comune"	Pausini, Cheope	Daniel Vuletic	3:16
13.	"Il caso è chiuso"	Pausini, Virginio Simonelli	Daniel Vuletic	3:29
14.	"Zona d'ombra"	Pausini, Niccolò Agliardi	Joseph Carta	2:50
15.	"Francesca (Piccola Aliena)"	Pausini	Daniel Vuletic	3:31
16.	"Il coraggio di andare"	Pausini, Tony Maiello	Tony Maiello, Marco Salvati, Enrico Palmosi, Marco Rettani	3:45

=== Hazte sentir ===
All lyrics adapted in Spanish by Laura Pausini.

Standard edition
No.	Title	Lyrics	Music	Length
1.	"Nadie ha dicho"	Niccolò Agliardi	Pausini, Edwyn Roberts, Gianluigi Fazio	3:27
2.	"Nuevo"	Pausini, Yoel Henríquez	Daniel Vuletic	4:12
3.	"La Solución"	Massimiliano Pelan, Giulia Anania, Fabio De Martino, Stefano Paviani	Pausini, Massimiliano Pelan, Giulia Anania, Fabio De Martino, Stefano Paviani	3:53
4.	"Está.Allá"	Pausini, Virginio Simonelli	Paolo Carta	3:35
5.	"Verdades a medias"	Niccolò Agliardi	Pausini, Edwyn Roberts	4:01
6.	"Dos ventanas"	Pausini, Eric Silver, Nikki Williams, Enrico Nigiotti	Eric Silver, Nikki Williams, Enrico Nigiotti, Samuel Galvagno	4:19
7.	"Fantástico (Haz lo que eres)"	Pausini, Virginio Simonelli	Pausini, Paolo Carta	3:34
8.	"No River Is Wilder"	Pausini	Paolo Carta	3:20
9.	"Algo que te debo"	Pausini	Paolo Carta	3:38
10.	"Un proyecto de vida en común"	Pausini, Cheope	Daniel Vuletic	3:16
11.	"El caso está perdido"	Pausini, Virginio Simonelli	Daniel Vuletic	3:29
12.	"Niebla gris"	Pausini, Niccolò Agliardi	Joseph Carta	2:50
13.	"Francesca"	Pausini	Daniel Vuletic	3:31
14.	"El valor de seguir adelante"	Pausini, Tony Maiello	Tony Maiello, Marco Salvati, Enrico Palmosi, Marco Rettani	3:45
Total length:				50:52

Hazte sentir más (reissue)
No.	Title	Lyrics	Music	Length
1.	"Nadie ha dicho"	Niccolò Agliardi	Pausini, Edwyn Roberts, Gianluigi Fazio	3:27
2.	"Nuevo"	Pausini, Yoel Henríquez	Daniel Vuletic	4:12
3.	"La Solución" (featuring Carlos Rivera)	Massimiliano Pelan, Giulia Anania, Fabio De Martino, Stefano Paviani	Pausini, Massimiliano Pelan, Giulia Anania, Fabio De Martino, Stefano Paviani	3:53
4.	"Está.Allá"	Pausini, Virginio Simonelli	Paolo Carta	3:35
5.	"Verdades a medias"	Niccolò Agliardi	Pausini, Edwyn Roberts	4:01
6.	"Dos ventanas"	Pausini, Eric Silver, Nikki Williams, Enrico Nigiotti	Eric Silver, Nikki Williams, Enrico Nigiotti, Samuel Galvagno	4:19
7.	"Fantástico (Haz lo que eres)"	Pausini, Virginio Simonelli	Pausini, Paolo Carta	3:34
8.	"No River Is Wilder"	Pausini	Paolo Carta	3:20
9.	"Nadie ha dicho" (featuring Gente de Zona)	Niccolò Agliardi	Pausini, Edwyn Roberts, Gianluigi Fazio	3:38
10.	"Algo que te debo"	Pausini	Paolo Carta	3:38
11.	"Un proyecto de vida en común"	Pausini, Cheope	Daniel Vuletic	3:16
12.	"El valor de seguir adelante"	Pausini, Tony Maiello	Tony Maiello, Marco Salvati, Enrico Palmosi, Marco Rettani	3:45
13.	"El caso está perdido"	Pausini, Virginio Simonelli	Daniel Vuletic	3:29
14.	"Niebla gris"	Pausini, Niccolò Agliardi	Joseph Carta	2:50
15.	"Francesca"	Pausini	Daniel Vuletic	3:31
16.	"El valor de seguir adelante" (featuring Biagio Antonacci)	Pausini, Tony Maiello	Tony Maiello, Marco Salvati, Enrico Palmosi, Marco Rettani	3:45
17.	"La Solución"	Massimiliano Pelan, Giulia Anania, Fabio De Martino, Stefano Paviani	Pausini, Massimiliano Pelan, Giulia Anania, Fabio De Martino, Stefano Paviani	3:55

== Charts ==
=== Weekly charts ===
Chart (2018)	Peak position
Austrian Albums (Ö3 Austria)	29
Belgian Albums (Ultratop Flanders)	30
Belgian Albums (Ultratop Wallonia)	3
Croatian International Albums (HDU)	3
Czech Albums (ČNS IFPI)	92
Dutch Albums (Album Top 100)	78
French Albums (SNEP)	38
German Albums (Offizielle Top 100)	25
Hungarian Albums (MAHASZ)	13
Italian Albums (FIMI)	1
Spanish Albums (Promusicae)	7
Swiss Albums (Schweizer Hitparade)	2
US Top Latin Albums (Billboard)	35
US World Albums (Billboard)	12

=== Year-end charts ===
Chart (2018)	Position
Belgian Albums (Ultratop Wallonia)	84
Italian Albums (FIMI)	3
Spanish Albums (PROMUSICAE)	42
Swiss Albums (Schweizer Hitparade)	38

== Certifications ==
Region	Certification	Certified units/sales
Italy (FIMI)	3× Platinum	150,000^{‡}
^{‡} Sales+streaming figures based on certification alone.
