= Paolo Carta =

Paolo Romano Carta
- Born: Paolo Romano Carta; 18 April 1964 (age 62); Rome, Italy
- Occupations: musician; singer; guitarist; musical director; record producer
- Years active: 1990–present
- Spouse: Roberta Galli (m. 1995; div. 2012) Laura Pausini (m. 2023)
- Children: 4, including Joseph
- Awards: Latin Grammy
- Musical career
- Genres: Pop; Rock
- Instrument: Guitar

Paolo Romano Carta (born 18 April 1964) is an Italian musician, singer, guitarist, musical director and record producer.

== Biography ==
Carta was born in Rome in 1964, he married Rebecca Galli, with whom he had three children, Jader (1995), Jacopo (1996) and Joseph (2000). In 2005 Carta began working as a guitarist for Laura Pausini, leading to a harsh separation with Galli partly due to the love affair that arose between Carta and Pausini when he was still married; the divorce became official in 2012. Since 2005 he has been the guitarist, musical director and romantic partner of Pausini, with whom he has a daughter named Paola (2013). After 18 years together, Carta and Pausini married on 22 March 2023.

== Career ==
He has collaborated with several greats of Italian song, including Adriano Celentano, Eros Ramazzotti, Alexia, Fabio Concato, Riccardo Cocciante, Max Pezzali, Gianni Morandi. He has also collaborated with international artists such as Whitney Houston, Manhattan Transfer, Lionel Richie and Gloria Gaynor.

Paolo began his public performance around the age of 10, for the fifth grade end of the year party and subsequently studied classical guitar for eight years. He is very open to all musical genres although his nature is mainly rock. In the period 1986–1987 he was a substitute guitarist for Banco del Mutuo Soccorso and was part of the official group that recorded the album Il Banco presents Francesco Di Giacomo in 1989 and also toured with them.

In 1987–1988 he collaborated on Adriano Celentano's album titled Il re degli ignoranti, later published in 1991, he participated in the Fantastico 8 television program that he hosted in that period and in his tour of Russia. His artistic career continued in 1989 when he began collaborating as a musician for several Italian song characters including Luca Barbarossa on the album Al di là del muro in 1989, Eros Ramazzotti and Max Pezzali. In 1989 he released his first album, Preguntas which contains 10 unpublished songs. In the texts we also find Bruno Lauzi. In 1990 he took part in Massimo Bizzarri's promotional tour. In 1992 he participated in the tour of Luca Barbarossa where Paolo was in charge of the arrangements, which also produced a live performance titled Vivo. From 1988 to 1996 he participated as a guitarist in some musical themes of the cartoons broadcast on the Mediaset networks.

As a guitarist in 1989 he also collaborated with Pinuccio Pirazzoli on the soundtrack for the second season of the cult series Fininvest Don Tonino with Andrea Roncato, Gigi Sammarchi and Manuel De Peppe under the direction of Fosco Gasperi.

In 1995 he began his collaboration with Dhamm: he produced his first record on the Italian label EMI and, later, he played with them and conducted the orchestra in two different editions of the Sanremo Music Festival. Later he also embarks on a solo career, but later he decides that being a singer is not his true passion, but playing and producing. In 1997, after having passed the selections by winning the first night of Sanremo Giovani 1996, she qualified for the 1997 Sanremo Music Festival and participated in the New Proposals category with the song Non si mai dire... mai.

Simultaneously to his participation in Sanremo in February he released his second album entitled Paolo Carta which, in addition to containing Non si mai dire... mai. contains 10 unpublished songs

In 2000 he returned to Gianni Morandi's side for the Come fa bene amore Tour, while since April 2001 he has been the guitarist on Eros Ramazzotti's Stilelibero Tour. From 2005 to date, he initiates his artistic partnership with Laura Pausini. Participating as a guitarist in her concerts and as a musical director. Since 2008 he has been involved in the production and arrangements of Laura Pausini's records and songs.

== Discography ==
=== Studio album ===
- 1989 – Domande ( Teen Five Récords )
- 1997 – Paolo Carta (5099748721822, Sony Music Entertainment )

=== Singles ===
- 1997 – Non siamo normali ( EPC6642271, Sony Music Entertainment )
- 1997 – Un pensiero che impar si puó bailar ( Instrumental ) ( Sony Music Entertainment )

=== Productions ===
- 1994 – Dhamm - Dhamm
- 1996 – Tra cielo y tierra - Dhamm
- 1997 – Disorient express - Dhamm
- 1997 – Paolo Carta ( Sony Music Entertainment )
- 2009 – La fuerza - Marco Carta
- 2010 – Il cuore muove - Marco Carta

=== Collaborations ===
with various artists

- 1987 – La pubblica ottusita – Adriano Celentano
- 1987 – Veneri – Mario Castelnuovo
- 1988 – Sul nido del cuculo – Mario Castelnuovo
- 1988 – Por paura o por amore – Mariella Nava
- 1988 – Impar tutti gli uomini – Lucca Barbarossa
- 1989 – Il giorno y la notte – Mariella Nava
- 1989 – Punti di vista – Loretta Goggi
- 1989 – Leali – Fausto Leali
- 1989 – Al di lá del muro – Lucca Barbarossa
- 1989 – Il Banco presenta Francesco Di Giacomo del Banco del Mutuo Soccorso
- 1989 – Totò – Franco Simone
- 1991 – Il re degli ignoranti – Adriano Celentano
- 1992 – Lacrime – Mia Martini
- 1992 – Mendicant y otro storie – Mariella Nava
- 1992 – El incantautore – Mimmo Cavallo
- 1993 – Lochness – Mina
- 1993 – Ciao paese – Marco Carena
- 1993 – Vive – Lucca Barbarossa
- 1993 – Evento y mutamenti – Riccardo Cocciante
- 1994 – Un uomo felice – Riccardo Cocciante
- 1994 – Dhamm – Dhamm
- 1994 – Scomporre y ricomporre – Fabio Concato
- 1994 – Le cus da salvés – Lucca Barbarossa
- 1994 – Canarino mannaro – Mina
- 1998 – 30 Volte Morandi – Gianni Morandi
- 1999 – Fabio Concato – Fabio Concato
- 2000 – Stile Libero DVD - Eros Ramazzotti
- 2004 – Gli occhi grandi della Luna – Alexia
- 2009 – La forza mia – Marco Carta
- 2010 – Il cuore muove – Marco Carta

With Laura Pausini

- 2006 – Io canto
- 2008 – Primavera in anticipo
- 2011 – Inedito
- 2013 – 20 – The Greatest Hits (Laura Pausini album)
- 2015 – Simili
- 2018 – Fatti sentire
- 2023 - Anime Parallele

== Filmography ==
- Laura Pausini – Laura Pausini: Piacere di conoscerti (Film: Music Documentary) – 2022

== Awards ==
=== Latin Grammy Awards ===
Year	Nomination	Category	Result
2018	Album Fatti sentire de Laura Pausini.	Best Producer and Mixed Engineer, Musician and Composer.	Winner
